= 2019 in sports =

2019 in sports describes the year's events in world sports. The main events were the 2019 Cricket World Cup, the 2019 Rugby World Cup, and the 2019 FIFA Women's World Cup.

== Air sports ==
=== Aerobatics ===
- July 5 – 13: 2nd FAI World Intermediate Aerobatic Championship in (Czech Republic) Břeclav
  - Individual Overall: (Ukraine) Igor Chernov
  - Team Winner: Ukraine (Igor Chernov, Timur Fatkullin, Dmitry Pogrebitsky)
- July 18 – 28: 10th FAI World Advanced Glider Aerobatic Championships Deva
  - Individual Overall: (Poland) Patrycja Pacak
  - Team Winner: Romania
- July 18 – 28: 22nd FAI World Glider Aerobatic Championships (Romania) Deva
  - Individual Overall: (Hungary) Ferenc Toth
  - Team Winner: Germany
- July 18 – 28: 11th FAI European Advanced Aerobatic Championships (Poland) Toruń
  - Individual Overall: (France) Nicolas Durin
  - Team Winner: France
- July 18 – 28: 11th FAI European Advanced Aerobatic Championships Châteauroux
  - Individual Mixed Overall: (France) Louis Vanel
  - Individual Women's Overall: (France) Aude Lemordant
  - Individual Men's Overall: (France) Louis Vanel
  - Team Winner: France

=== Air racing ===
2019 Red Bull Air Race World Championship

- February 8 & 9: Red Bull Air Race #1 in (United Arab Emirates) Abu Dhabi
  - Winner: (Japan) Yoshihide Muroya (Zivko Edge 540 V3)
  - Challenger winner: (Germany) Florian Bergér (both)
- June 15 & 16: Red Bull Air Race #2 in (Russia) Kazan
  - Winner: (Japan) Yoshihide Muroya (Zivko Edge 540 V3)
  - Challenger winner: (Hong Kong) Kenni Chiang (Race 1) / (Germany) Florian Bergér (Race 2)
- July 13 & 14: Red Bull Air Race #3 in (Hungary) Zamárdi
  - Winner: (Australia) Matt Hall (Zivko Edge 540 V3)
  - Challenger winner: (Italy) Dario Costa (Race 1) / (Sweden) Daniel Ryfa (Race 2)
- September 7 & 8: Red Bull Air Race #4 in (Japan) Makuhari (final)
  - Winner: (Japan) Yoshihide Muroya (Zivko Edge 540 V3)
  - Challenger races cancelled

=== Aeromodelling ===
- March 17 – 23: 2019 FAI F3P World Championship for Indoor Aerobatic Model Aircraft in (Greece) Heraklion
  - F3P – (Indoor aerobatics) winner: (Austria) Gernot Bruckmann
  - Junior F3P – (Indoor aerobatics) winner: (France) Maxime Schmitt
  - F3 – Radio Controlled Flight winner: (Lithuania) Donatas Paužuolis
  - Junior F3 – Radio Controlled Flight winner: (Austria) Andreas Wildauer
- June 2 – 9: 2019 FAI F1D European Championships for Free Flight Indoor Model Aircraft in (Czech Republic) Tachov
  - Senior winner: (Slovakia) Ivan Tréger
  - Junior winner: (Ukraine) Vladyslav Dziubak
  - Senior team winner: Ukraine
  - Junior team winner: Ukraine
- October 17 – 22: 2019 FAI F1 World Championships for Free Flight Model Aircraft in (United States) Lost Hills
  - F1A Individual: (Romania) Constantin Brinzoi
  - F1A Individual: (France) Mickael Rigault
  - F1A Individual: (United States) Taron Malkhasyan
  - F1A Team: Russia
  - F1A Team: Israel
  - F1A Team: Lithuania
  - Challenge France: Poland

=== Ballooning ===
- August 27 - September 1: Slovenian Open National Hot Air Balloon Championship 2019 in (Slovenia) Murska Sobota
  - Winners: 1st. (United Kingdom) Dominic Bareford; 2nd. (United States) John Petrehn; 3rd. (Australia) Matthew Scaife
- September 9 – 14: 3rd Central European Cup (Hungary) Szeged
  - Winners: 1st. (Austria) Daniel Kusternigg; 2nd. (Hungary) Peter Molnar; 3rd. (Russia) Evgeny Chubarov
- September 9 – 14: 1st Women European Cup (Hungary) Szeged
  - Winners: 1st. (Russia) Diana Nasonova; 2nd. (Hungary) Tita Becz; 3rd. (Latvia) Inga Ule
- September 12 – 21: 63rd Coupe Aéronautique Gordon Bennett in (France) Montbéliard
  - Winners: 1st. (Switzerland) Laurent Sciboz / Nicolas Tieche; 2nd. (Switzerland) Kurt Frieden / Pascal Witpraechtiger; 3rd. (France) Vincent Leys / Christophe Houver
- October 20 – 27: 21st FAI European Hot Air Balloon Championship in (Spain) Mallorca
  - Winners: 1st. (Switzerland) Stefan Zeberli 2nd. (Switzerland) Laurynas Komža 3rd. (France) Nicolas Schwartz

=== Drone racing ===
FAI World Drone Masters

- November 1 & 3: Jeonju FAI World Drone Masters (WCM #1) in (South Korea) Jeonju
  - Winners: 1st. (South Korea) MinChan Kim, 2nd. (South Korea) JaeJong Kim, 3rd. (South Korea) ChangHyeon Kang

2019 FAI Drone Racing World Cup

- March 12: Race Of Drones Oulu (WCC #1) in (Finland) Oulu
  - Winners: 1st. (Latvia) Tomass Pētersons, 2nd. (Norway) Even Braaten, 3rd. (Sweden) Glen Bales
- May 11 & 12: MajFlaj in (North Macedonia) (WCC #2) Skopje
  - Winners: 1st. (North Macedonia) Jakub Toman, 2nd. (Czech Republic) David Svoboda, 3rd. (Serbia) Aleksandar Stojanovic
- May 31 – June 2: World Cup Drones FAI F9U El Yelmo (WCC #3) in (Spain) El Yelmo
  - Winners: 1st. (France) Killian Rousseau, 2nd. (Spain) Roberto Gomez Samaniego, 3rd. (Russia) Kirill Fedukovich
- June 1 & 2: Seoul Drone Race World Cup (WCC #4) in (South Korea) Seoul
  - Winners: 1st. (South Korea) Beom Jin Choi, 2nd. (South Korea) Min Chan Kim, 3rd. (South Korea) Young Rok Son
- June 15 & 16: World Cup Latvia Drone Racing (WCC #5) in Cēsis
  - Winners: 1st. (Latvia) Tomass Pētersons, 2nd. (Latvia) Oskars Raudins, 3rd. (Czech Republic) David Spacek
- July 6 & 7: Partouche Drone Race World Cup (WCC #6) in (France) Forges-les-Eaux
  - Winners: 1st. (France) Killian Rousseau, 2nd. (Poland) Pawel Laszczak, 3rd. (France) Fabien Collobert
- July 13 & 14: German Drone World Cup (WCC #7) in (Germany) Nördlingen
  - Winners: 1st. (South Korea) Sungju Park, 2nd. (Germany) Sven Keim, 3rd. (Austria) Bastian Hackl
- July 20 & 21: Belgium FAI Drone Racing World Cup (WCC #8) in Gouy-lez-Piéton
  - Winners: 1st. (France) Killian Rouseau, 2nd. (Belgium) Victor Van Der Elst, 3rd. (South Korea) JoonWeon Choi
- August 10 & 11: Belarus Drone Racing World Cup (WCC #9) in Minsk
  - Winners: 1st. (Latvia) Tomass Pētersons, 2nd. (Lithuania) Arminas Volskis, 3rd. (South Korea) JoonWeon Choi
- August 17 & 18: Moscow Cup (WCC #10) in (Russia) Moscow
  - Winners: 1st. (South Korea) Seojun Kim, 2nd. (Germany) Vitaly Palianski, 3rd. (South Korea) SiYun Kim
- August 17 & 18: German Drone Championship (WCC #11) in (Germany) Crailsheim
  - Winners: 1st. (Germany) Nick Nolte, 2nd. (Czech Republic) Lukas Lendvorsky, 3rd. (Germany) Sven-Kevin Keim
- August 24 & 25: UK Drone Racing Open International (WCC #12) in (United Kingdom) Barkston Heath
  - Winners: 1st. (United Kingdom) Brett Collis, 2nd. (United Kingdom) Luke Wolferstan-Bannister, 3rd. (United Kingdom) Alfie Mitchell
- September 7 & 8: F9U World Cup Italy (WCC #13) in Modena
  - Winners: 1st. (United Kingdom) Sven-Kevin Keim, 2nd. (Italy) Emanuele Tomasello, 3rd. (Italy) Luisa Rizzo
- September 13 – 15: EPFL Drone Racing Cup (WCC #14) in (Switzerland) Lausanne
  - Winners: 1st. (Poland) Pawel Laszczak, 2nd. (France) Tristan Goin, 3rd. (Finland) Nikolas Widell
- September 14 & 15: Mazovia Drone Racing (WCC #15) in (Poland) Warsaw
  - Winners: 1st. (Latvia) Tomass Pētersons, 2nd. (Poland) Michał Mrówczyński, 3rd. (Ukraine) Modest Ach
- September 14 & 15: Pam Cup (WCC #16) in (Bulgaria) Plovdiv
  - Winners: 1st. (North Macedonia) Bojan Nikov, 2nd. (North Macedonia) Aleksandar Nikov, 3rd. (Bulgaria) Zlatko D. Radev
- September 21 & 22: Daegu Drone Race World Cup (WCC #17) in (South Korea) Daegu
  - Winners: 1st. (South Korea) MinChan Kim, 2nd. (China) Michał Mrówczyński, 3rd. (Ukraine) Modest Ach
- September 21 & 22: Lithuania Drone Racing World Cup (WCC #18) in Vilnius
  - Winners: 1st. (Latvia) Karlis Gross, 2nd. (Latvia) Aleksis Arbergs, 3rd. (Finland) Aleksi Rastas
- October 12 & 13: Phoenix Drone Racing (WCC #19) in (North Macedonia) Prilep
  - Winners: 1st. (Czech Republic) David Spacek, 2nd. (Switzerland) Michael Husarik, 3rd. (Bulgaria) Antoni Georgiev
- October 25 & 27: Drone World Cup Carrefour Montequinto (WCC #20) in (Spain) Seville
  - Winners: 1st. (Switzerland) Michael Husarik, 2nd. (Spain) Christian Gavilán Gómez, 3rd. (Finland) Aleksi Rastas
- November 1 & 2: Drone Tokyo 2019 Racing & Conference (WCC #21) in (Japan) Tokyo
  - Winners: 1st. (Japan) Takafumi Oka, 2nd. (Japan) Kazuki Kawada, 3rd. (Japan) Fuga Kamizeki
- November 16 & 17: FAI Hong Kong Open Drone Racing Championship (World Cup) (WCC #21) in Hong Kong
  - Winners: 1st. (South Korea) SungJu Park, 2nd. (Hong Kong) Chow Ronnie, 3rd. (Japan) Ken Inoue
- December 7 & 8: TIRT Drone Racing World Cup (WCC #22) in (Chinese Taipei) Taoyuan
  - Winners: 1st. (South Korea) SungJu Park, 2nd. (Japan) Ken Inoue, 3rd. (Chinese Taipei) Alexander Lea

=== General aviation ===
- June 10 – 16: 24th FAI World Precision Flying Championship in (Spain) Castellón de la Plana
  - Individual Winner: (Poland) Michal Wieczorek
  - Navigation Trophy: (Poland) Michal Wieczorek
  - Landing: (Poland) Jerzy Markiewicz
  - Team: (Poland) Polonia
  - Team Landing: (Poland) Polonia
  - Woman Best Pilot: (France) Adele Schramm
- September 8 – 13: 2nd FAI World Air Navigation Race Championship in (Portugal) Santa Cruz
  - Winners: 1st. (Poland) Boleslaw Radomski & Dariusz Lechowski, 2nd. (Spain) Yuri Rabassa & Mauro Esteve, 3rd. (France) Adele Schramm & Alexis Fuchs

=== Gliding ===
FAI WORLD AND CONTINENTAL CHAMPIONSHIPS (CAT.1)

- May 11 – 25: 20th FAI European Gliding Championships in Turbia
  - Open Class: 1st. (Czech Republic) Petr Tichý, 2nd. (Italy) Riccardo Brigliadori, 3rd. (Germany) Markus Frank
  - 18m Class: 1st. (Poland) Sebastian Kawa, 2nd. (Poland) Karol Staryszak, 3rd. (Austria) Wolfgang Janowitsch
  - 20m Multi-Seat Class: 1st. (Poland) Tomasz Rubaj & Christoph Matkowski, 2nd. (United Kingdom) Steve Jones & Garry Coppin, 3rd. (Germany) Uli Gmelin & Christine Grote
  - Team Cup: 1st. France, 2nd. Poland, 3rd. United Kingdom
- June 1 – 8: 9th FAI World Sailplane Grand Prix Championship in (Spain) Cerdanya
  - 1st: (Germany) Tilo Holighaus; 2nd: (Poland) Sebastian Kawa; 3rd: (France) Louis Bouderlique
- July 6 – 21: 20th FAI European Gliding Championships in (Slovakia) Prievidza
  - Club: (United Kingdom) Tom Arscott
  - Standard: (Czech Republic) Pavel Louzecky
  - 15 metre: (Poland) Sebastian Kawa
  - Team Cup: Germany
- July 28 – 10: 11th FAI Junior World Gliding Championships in (Hungary) Szeged
  - Club: (United Kingdom) Jake Brattle
  - Standard: (Germany) Simon Schröder
  - Team Cup: (Germany) Deutscher Aero Club
- July 28 – 10: 3rd FAI Pan-American Gliding Championship in (Canada) Rockton, Ontario
  - 15 Meter /Standard: (Canada) Luke Szczepaniak
  - 18 Meter: (Canada) Jerzy Szemplinski
  - Club: (Argentina) Carlos Iucci
  - Team Cup: Argentina
- September 1 – 14: 3rd FAI World 13.5m Class Gliding Championship in (Italy) Pavullo nel Frignano
  - Meter 13 5: (Italy) Thomas Gostner
  - e-Glide: (Slovenia) Luka Znidarsic

=== Parachuting ===
- February 27 – March 2: 17th FAI World Para-Ski Championships in (Czech Republic) Vrchlabí
- April 17 – 20: 3rd FAI World Indoor Skydiving Championships in (France) Lille
- May 18 – 15: 14th FAI World Cup of Freefall Style and Accuracy Landing in (Argentina) Córdoba
- August 12 – 15: 4th FAI World Cup of Speed Skydiving & 3rd FAI European Speed Skydiving Championship in (United Kingdom) Dunkeswell
  - Men's winner: (Belgium) Luc Maisin
  - Women's winner: (Germany) Lucy Lippold
  - Team winner: Germany
- August 17 – 20: 10th FAI World Cup of Canopy Formation & 8th FAI European Canopy Formation Championships in (Romania) Strejnic
  - Canopy Formation 2-way sequential winners: France A
  - Canopy Formation 4-way sequential winners: Russia 4W
- August 23 – 30: 1st FAI European Wingsuit Flying Championship & 3rd FAI World Cup of Wingsuit Flying in (Italy) Ravenna
  - Wingsuit acrobatic flying winner: Switzerland
  - Wingsuit performance flying winner: (Russia) Dmitry Podoryashy
- October 7 – 12: 13th FAI World Cup of Artistic Events & 22nd FAI World Cup of Formation Skydiving in (United States) Eloy
- October 18 – 29: 43rd CISM World Military Parachuting Championship in (China) Wuhan City
- November 20 – 24: 10th FAI World Cup of Canopy Piloting in (South Africa) Pretoria

=== Paragliding ===
World Championships

- September 8 – 18: 10th FAI World Paragliding Accuracy Championship in (Serbia) Vršac
  - Men's winner: (China) Yong Wu
  - Women's winner: (South Korea) Soyoung Cho
  - Team winner: Indonesia

2019-20 Paragliding World Cup

- May 25 – June 1: 2019 World Cup France (WC #1) in Chamousset
  - Men's winner: (France) Charles Cazaux
  - Women's winner: (France) Méryl Delferriere
  - Teams winner: (United Kingdom) / (France) Ozone
  - Nations winner: France
- June 8 – 15: 2019 World Cup China (WC #2) in Linzhou
  - Men's winner: (France) Baptiste Lambert
  - Women's winner: (France) Méryl Delferriere
  - Team's winner: (Switzerland) / (United Kingdom) / (Czech Republic) Gin Gliders
  - Nation's winner: France
- June 29 – July 6: 2019 World Cup Portugal (WC #3) in Manteigas
  - Men's winner: (France) Honorin Hamard
  - Women's winner: (France) Constance Mettetal
  - Team's winner: (Germany) / (France) / (Brazil) Ozone
  - Nation's winner: France
- September 7 – 14: 2019 World Cup Brazil (WC #4) in Pico do Gavião
  - Men's winner: (France) Baptiste Lambert
  - Women's winner: (Brazil) Marcella Pomarico Uchoa
  - Team's winner: (France) / (Germany) / (Poland) Kortel Design
  - Nation's winner: Brazil
- November 9 – 16: 2019 World Cup Argentina (WC #5) in Loma Bola
  - Men's winner: (Serbia) Jurij Vidic
  - Women's winner: (Hungary) Adel Honti
  - Team's winner: (Switzerland) / (United Kingdom) / (Czech Republic) Gin Gilders
  - Nation's winner: France
- March 24 – April 4, 2020: 2019 World Cup Superfinal in (Brazil) Castelo

=== Para-Ski ===
2019 Para-Ski World Cup

- January 25 – 27: WC #1 in (Switzerland) Disentis
  - Winners: (Austria) Sebastian Graser (m) / (Austria) Magdalena Schwertl (f)
  - Juniors winner: (Austria) Sebastian Graser
  - Masters winner: (Germany) Reinhold Haibel
  - Teams winners: (Austria) HSV Red Bull Salzburg 1 (Sebastian Graser, Manuel Sulzbacher, Anton Gruber, Magdalena Schwertl)
  - Ski winners: (Austria) Sebastian Graser (m) / (Austria) Magdalena Schwertl (f)
- February 8 – 10: WC #2 in (Italy) Ponte di Legno
  - Winners: (Italy) Marco Valente (m) / (Austria) Magdalena Schwertl (f)
  - Juniors winner: (Austria) Manuel Sulzbacher
  - Masters winner: (Italy) Marco Valente
  - Teams winners: (Austria) HSV Red Bull Salzburg 1 (Sebastian Graser, Manuel Sulzbacher, Anton Gruber, Magdalena Schwertl)
  - Ski winners: (Austria) Sebastian Graser (m) / (Austria) Magdalena Schwertl (f)
  - Accuracy winners: (Austria) Alic Gernot (m) / (Austria) Magdalena Schwertl (f)
- February 15 – 17: WC #3 in (Austria) Bad Leonfelden
  - Winners: (Austria) Sebastian Graser (m) / (Austria) Magdalena Schwertl (f)
  - Juniors winner: (Austria) Sebastian Graser
  - Masters winner: (Germany) Reinhold Haibel
  - Teams winners: (Austria) HSV Red Bull Salzburg 1 (Sebastian Graser, Manuel Sulzbacher, Julia Schosser, Magdalena Schwertl)
  - Ski winners: (Austria) Sebastian Graser (m) / (Austria) Magdalena Schwertl (f)
- February 27 – March 2: 17th FAI World Para-Ski Championships in (Czech Republic) Vrchlabí (part of World Cup)
  - Winners: (Austria) Sebastian Graser (m) / (Austria) Magdalena Schwertl (f)
  - Juniors Mixed winner: (Austria) Sebastian Graser
  - Masters Mixed winner: (Austria) Thomas Saurer
  - Women's Para-Ski Teams winner: Austria
  - Mixed Para-Ski Teams winner: Austria

== American football ==
- Super Bowl LIII – the New England Patriots (AFC) won 13–3 over the Los Angeles Rams (NFC)
  - Location: Mercedes-Benz Stadium
  - Attendance: 70,081
  - MVP: Julian Edelman, WR (New England)

== Archery ==
=== 2018–19 Indoor Archery World Series ===
- Note: This is the inaugural set of indoor archery events that replaced the World Cup.
- November 23 – 25, 2018: 2018 GT Open in (Luxembourg) Strassen
  - Recurve winners: (Netherlands) Steve Wijler (m) / (United States) Casey Kaufhold (f)
  - Compound winners: (Croatia) Domagoj Buden (m) / (Slovenia) Toja Ellison (f)
- December 1 & 2, 2018: 2018 Macau Indoor Archery Open in Macau
  - Recurve winners: (South Korea) Oh Jin-hyek (m) / (South Korea) JEON Hun-young (f)
  - Compound winners: (Netherlands) Mike Schloesser (m) / (United States) Alexis Ruiz (f)
- December 14 – 16, 2018: 2018 Roma Archery Trophy in (Italy) Rome
  - Recurve winners: (Canada) Crispin Duenas (m) / (South Korea) KIM Su-rin (f)
  - Compound winners: (United States) Braden Gellenthien (m) / (United States) Alexis Ruiz (f)
  - Junior recurve winners: (Italy) Matteo Canovai (m) / (Ukraine) Olha Shubkina (f)
  - Junior compound winners: (Finland) Kalle Numminen (m) / (United States) Faith Miller (f)
- January 18 – 20: 2019 Nîmes Archery Tournament in France
  - Recurve winners: (South Korea) Lee Seung-yun (m) / (South Korea) KANG Chae-young (f)
  - Compound winners: (United States) Braden Gellenthien (m) / (Germany) Janine Meissner (f)
  - Junior recurve winners: (France) Jules Vautrin (m) / (Italy) Aiko Rolando (f)
  - Junior compound winners: (United States) Carson Sapp (m) / (United States) Faith Miller (f)
- February 7 – 9: 2019 Vegas Shoot in (United States) Las Vegas
  - Recurve winners: (South Korea) MIN Byeong-yeon (m) / (South Korea) SIM Ye-ji (f)
  - Compound winners: (Denmark) Stephan Hansen (m) / (South Korea) SO Chae-won (f)
- February 8: 2019 Indoor Archery World Series Final in (United States) Las Vegas
  - Recurve winners: (Netherlands) Steve Wijler (m) / (South Korea) SIM Ye-ji (f)
  - Compound winners: (United States) Kris Schaff (m) / (Russia) Viktoria Balzhanova (f)

=== 2019 Archery World Cup & Championship events ===
- April 22 – 28: WA World Cup #1 in Medellín
  - Recurve winners: (United States) Brady Ellison (m) / (South Korea) KANG Chae-young (f)
  - Compound winners: (Netherlands) Mike Schloesser (m) / (Colombia) Sara López (f)
  - Team recurve winners: South Korea (m) / South Korea (f)
  - Team compound winners: Italy (m) / Colombia (f)
  - Mixed winners: South Korea (Recurve) / United States (Compound)
- May 6 – 12: WA World Cup #2 in (China) Shanghai
  - Recurve winners: (South Korea) Lee Woo-seok (m) / (South Korea) KANG Chae-young (f)
  - Compound winners: (United States) Braden Gellenthien (m) / (South Korea) So Chae-won (f)
  - Team recurve winners: Chinese Taipei (m) / South Korea (f)
  - Team compound winners: United States (m) / United States (f)
  - Mixed winners: Chinese Taipei (Recurve) / United States (Compound)
- May 20 – 26: WA World Cup #3 in (Turkey) Antalya
  - Recurve winners: (United States) Brady Ellison (m) / (China) ZHENG Yichai (f)
  - Compound winners: (United States) James Lutz (m) / (South Africa) Danelle Wentzel (f)
  - Team recurve winners: China (m) / Chinese Taipei (f)
  - Team compound winners: Denmark (m) / United States (f)
  - Mixed winners: Spain (Recurve) / South Africa (Compound)
- June 10 – 16: 2019 World Archery Championships in (Netherlands) 's-Hertogenbosch
  - Recurve winners: (United States) Brady Ellison (m) / (Chinese Taipei) Lei Chien-ying (f)
  - Compound winners: (United States) James Lutz (m) / (Russia) Natalia Avdeeva (f)
  - Team recurve winners: China (m) / Chinese Taipei (f)
  - Team compound winners: South Korea (m) / Chinese Taipei (f)
  - Mixed winners: South Korea (Recurve) / South Korea (Compound)
- July 1 – 7: WA World Cup #4 in (Germany) Berlin
  - Recurve winners: (Turkey) Mete Gazoz (m) / (South Korea) AN San (f)
  - Compound winners: (Turkey) Evren Çağıran (m) / (United States) Alexis Ruiz (f)
  - Team recurve winners: Turkey (m) / Italy (f)
  - Team compound winners: France (m) / Turkey (f)
  - Mixed winners: South Korea (Recurve) / Great Britain (Compound)
- August 19 – 25: 2019 World Youth Archery Championships in (Spain) Madrid
  - Junior recurve winners: (South Korea) KIM Hyeon-jong (m) / (Colombia) Valentina Acosta Giraldo (f)
  - Junior compound winners: (Norway) Anders Faugstad (m) / (Croatia) Amanda Mlinaric (f)
  - Junior team recurve winners: South Korea (m) / South Korea (f)
  - Junior team compound winners: United States (m) / United States (f)
  - Junior Mixed team winners: South Korea (Recurve) / India (Compound)
  - Cadet recurve winners: (Chinese Taipei) TAI Yu-hsuan (m) / (India) Komalika Bari (f)
  - Cadet compound winners: (Mexico) Sebastian Garcia (m) / (Russia) Arina Cherkezova (f)
  - Cadet Team recurve winners: South Korea (m) / South Korea (f)
  - Cadet Team compound winners: United States (m) / United States (f)
  - Cadet Mixed team winners: South Korea (Recurve) / Mexico (Compound)
- September 2 – 7: 2019 World Archery 3D Championships in (Canada) Lac La Biche
  - Barebow winners: (France) David Jackson (m) / (France) Christine Gauthe (f)
  - Compound winners: (Hungary) Gyorgy Gondan (m) / (Austria) Ingrid Ronacher (f)
  - Instinctive Bow winners: (Hungary) Ferenc Molnár (m) / (Austria) Karin Novi (f)
  - Longbow winners: (Russia) Mikhail Poddevalin (m) / (Sweden) Leena-Kaarina Saviluoto (f)
  - Team winners: France (m) / France (f)
- September 6 & 7: WA World Cup #5 (final) in (Russia) Moscow
  - Recurve winners: (United States) Brady Ellison (m) / (South Korea) KANG Chae-young (f)
  - Compound winners: (Netherlands) Mike Schloesser (m) / (Colombia) Sara López (f)
  - Mixed team winners: South Korea (Recurve) / United States (Compound)

=== 2019 European Archery events ===
- February 26 – March 2: 2019 European Indoor Archery Championships in Samsun
  - Senior Recurve winners: (Italy) Mandia Massimiliano (m) / (Russia) Sayana Tsyrempilova (f)
  - Senior Compound winners: (Netherlands) Mike Schloesser (m) / (Turkey) Gizem Elmaagacli (f)
  - Junior recurve winners: (Ukraine) Ivan Kozhokar (m) / (Ukraine) Zhanna Naumova (f)
  - Junior compound winners: (Estonia) Robin Jaatma (m) / (Italy) Elisa Roner (f)
  - Senior Team recurve winners: Russia (m) / Russia (f)
  - Senior Team compound winners: France (m) / Russia (f)
  - Junior team recurve winners: Turkey (m) / Russia (f)
  - Junior team compound winners: Turkey (m) / Italy (f)
- April 9 – 13: European Grand Prix & Quota Tournament for Minsk European Games in (Romania) Bucharest
  - Recurve winners: (Netherlands) Steve Wijler (m) / (Belarus) Karyna Kazlouskaya (f)
  - Compound winners: (Italy) Valerio della Stua (m) / (Croatia) Amanda Mlinaric (f)
  - QT Recurve winners: (Slovakia) Vladimir Hurban Jr. (m) / (Romania) Beatrice Miklos (f)
  - QT Compound winners: (United Kingdom) Adam Ravenscroft (m) / (Germany) Janine Meissner (f)
  - Men's team recurve winners: Netherlands (Sjef van den Berg, Rick van der Ven, & Steve Wijler)
  - Women's team recurve winners: Germany (Michelle Kroppen, Elena Richter, & Lisa Unruh)
  - Mixed team recurve winners: Italy (Elena Tonetta & Federico Musolesi)
  - Men's team compound winners: Germany (Sebastian Hamdorf, Leon Hollas, & Marcel Trachsel)
  - Women's team compound winners: Estonia (Emily Hõim, Lisell Jäätma, & Meeri-Marita Paas)
  - Mixed team compound winners: Great Britain (Layla Annison & Stuart Taylor)
  - CQ Men's Team winners: Netherlands (Sjef van den Berg, Rick van der Ven, & Steve Wijler)
  - CQ Women's Team winners: Denmark (Randi Degn, Maja Jager, & Anne Marie Laursen)
- April 28 – May 5: Para-Archery European Cup – 1st leg in (Italy) Olbia
  - For detailed results, click here
- May 13–18: European Youth Cup – 1st leg in (Slovenia) Čatež ob Savi
  - For detailed results, click here
- June 23–29: Archery at the 2019 European Games in (Belarus) Minsk
  - Recurve winners: (Italy) Mauro Nespoli (m) / (Italy) Tatiana Andreoli (f)
  - Compound winners: (Netherlands) Mike Schloesser (m) / (Slovenia) Toja Ellison (f)
  - Team recurve winners: France (m) / United Kingdom (f)
  - Mixed winners: Italy (Recurve) / Russia (Compound)
- July 6–14: Para-Archery European Cup – 2nd leg in (Czech Republic) Nové Město na Moravě
  - For detailed results, click here
- July 15–20: European Youth Cup – 2nd leg in (Romania) Bucharest
  - For detailed results, click here
- September 14–15: European Club Teams Cup in (Slovenia) Čatež ob Savi
  - Winners: (France) Archers de Rennes (m) / (France) Les Archeres Riomois (f)
- September 30 – October 5: European Archery Field Championships in (Slovenia) Mokrice Castle
  - For detailed results, click here

=== 2019 Asian Archery events ===
- February 13 – 16: IWAS World Games 2019 (Archery) in (United Arab Emirates) Sharjah
  - Recurve winners: (Thailand) Netsiri Manreuchai (m) / (India) Pooja (f)
  - Men's compound winner: (South Korea) Lee Ouk Soo
  - Men's W1 winner: (South Korea) Park Hong Jo
- February 22 – 27: 3rd ISSF International Solidarity World Ranking Archery Championships in Dhaka
  - Recurve winners: (Thailand) Denchai Thepna (m) / (Bangladesh) Diya Siddique (f)
  - Compound winners: (Chinese Taipei) Chen Chieh-Lun (m) / (India) . Pragati (f)
  - Recurve teams winners: India (Bishal Changmai, Hooda Paras, Karni Singh Chauhan) (m) / Iran (Parmida Ghassemi, Shiva Shojamehr, Niloofar Alipour) (f)
  - Compound teams winners: India (Chahal Ritik, Jawkar Prathamesh Samadhan, Vidyarthi Chirag) (m) / Bangladesh (Shamoli Ray, Susmita Banik, Bonna Akhter) (f)
  - Mixed teams winners: Germany (Kristina Berger & Marcel Trachsel) (Compound) / India (Hooda Paras & Komalika Bari) (Recurve)
- March 24 – 30: International Archery Tournament “Kuralai” in Shymkent
  - Recurve winners: (Kazakhstan) Mansur Alimbaev (m) / (Tajikistan) Mavzuna Azimova (f)
  - Junior recurve winners: (Kazakhstan) Andrey Kuzmin (m) / (Kazakhstan) Anastasia Shapovalova (f)
  - Compound winners: (Kazakhstan) Zhomart Bektursyn (m) / (Kazakhstan) Zarema Edige (f)
  - Recurve mixed Team winners: Kazakhstan (Zaure Sansyzbay & Mansur Alimbaev)
  - Mixed Junior recurve Team winners: Kazakhstan (Alma Kalibayeva & Daniyar Boztayev)
  - Mixed compound team winners: Kazakhstan (Aidana Mukhtarhanova & Islam Djanibekov)
- March 24 – 31: 2019 Asia Cup-World Ranking Tournament in (Thailand) Bangkok
  - Recurve winners: (Kazakhstan) Ilfat Abdullin (m) / (China) Zheng Yichai (f)
  - Compound winners: (Iran) Mohammadsaleh Palizban (m) / (India) Muskan Kirar (f)
  - Recurve team winners: China (Ding Yiliang, Hao Feng, Li Jialun) (m) / China (An Qixuan, Meng Fanxu, Zheng Yichai)
  - Compound team winners: India (. Vikas, Siddhant Gupta, Vedant Wankhade) (m) / Malaysia (Nur Aina Yasmine Halim, Fatin Nurfatehah Mat Salleh, Nurul Syazhera Mohd Asmi) (f)
  - Recurve mixed winners: India (Ankita Bhakat & Yashdeep Bhoge)
  - Compound mixed winners: Iran (Seyedeh-Vida Halimianavval & Mohammadsaleh Palizban)
- April 10 – 16: 5th Fazza Para Archery World Ranking Tournament in (United Arab Emirates) Dubai
  - Recurve winners: (Japan) Ueyama Tomohiro (m) / (United Kingdom) Hazel Chaisty (f)
  - Compound winners: (Slovakia) Marcel Pavlik (m) / (United Kingdom) Jodi Grinham (f)
  - Recurve/Compound W1 winners: (Finland) Jean Pierre Antonios (m) / (Japan) Shinohara Aya (f)
  - Mixed winners: Italy (Recurve) / United Kingdom (Compound)
  - Mixed recurve/Compound W1 winners: South Korea
- July 11 – 18: Tokyo 2020 Test Event in (Japan) Tokyo
  - South Korea won both the gold and overall medal tallies.
- July 20 – 21: Interport Indoor Archery Open in Hong Kong
  - Recurve winners: (China) He Ying (m) / (Iraq) Almashhadani Fatimah Saad Mahmood (f)
  - Compound winners: (Hong Kong) Chu Chung Kong (m) / (Hong Kong) Poon Yee Tung (f)
- July 22 – 25: Asian Youth Indoor Archery Open in Hong Kong Winners: Hong Kong (Fischer Dylan Wei Ying, Yiu Ngo Him Jasper, Leung Ngo Kiu, Wu Shi Yan)
- August 1 – 7: 2019 Asia Cup – World Ranking Tournament in (Chinese Taipei) Taipei
  - For detailed results, click here
- October 17 – 24: 2019 Asian Para Archery Championships in (Thailand) Bangkok
  - China won both the gold and overall medal tallies.
- November 22 – 28: 2019 Asian Archery Championships in (Thailand) Bangkok
  - South Korea won both the gold and overall medal tallies.

=== 2019 African Archery events ===
- August 5 – 18: Grand Prix de Côte d'Ivoire in Abidjan
  - Ivory Coast won both the gold and overall medal tallies.

== Baseball ==
=== WBSC ===
- July 26 – August 4: 2019 U-12 Baseball World Cup in Tainan
  - Chinese Taipei defeated Japan, 4–0, to win their second U-12 Baseball World Cup title. Cuba took third place.
- August 30 – September 8: 2019 U-18 Baseball World Cup in Gijang County
  - Chinese Taipei defeated the United States, 2–1, to win their third U-18 Baseball World Cup title. South Korea took third place.
- September 18 – 22: Europe/Africa Baseball 2020 Olympic Qualifier in (Italy) Bologna & Parma
  - Israel has qualified to compete at the 2020 Summer Olympics.
- November 2 – 17: 2019 WBSC Premier12 in Chinese Taipei, South Korea, Mexico, & Japan

=== Major League Baseball ===
- March 20 – September 29: 2019 Major League Baseball season
  - American League regular season winners: (Texas) Houston Astros
  - National League regular season winners: (California) Los Angeles Dodgers
- June 3–5: 2019 Major League Baseball draft in Secaucus, New Jersey
  - #1 pick: Adley Rutschman (to the (Maryland) Baltimore Orioles from the Oregon State Beavers)
- July 9: 2019 Major League Baseball All-Star Game at Progressive Field in (Ohio) Cleveland
  - The American League defeated the National League, 4–3.
  - MVP: (California) Shane Bieber ( (Ohio) Cleveland Indians)
  - 2019 Major League Baseball Home Run Derby Winner: (Florida) Pete Alonso ( (New York (state)) New York Mets)
- October 22 – 30: 2019 World Series
  - The (Washington, D.C.) Washington Nationals defeated the (Texas) Houston Astros, 4–3 in games played, to win their first World Series title.

=== 2019 Little League Baseball World Series ===
- July 27 – August 3: 2019 Senior League Baseball World Series in (South Carolina) Easley at Easley Recreation Complex
  - Team USA West Region ( (Hawaii) Wailuku) defeated Team Caribbean Region ( (Curaçao) Willemstad), 11–0, in the final.
- July 28 – August 4: 2019 Little League Intermediate (50/70) Baseball World Series in (California) Livermore at Max Baer Park
  - Team USA Southeast Region ( (Alabama) McCalla) defeated Team Mexico Region ( Matamoros), 9–5, in the final.
- August 11 – 18: 2019 Junior League Baseball World Series in (Michigan) Taylor at Heritage Park
  - Team USA West Region ( (California) Fullerton) defeated Team Puerto Rico Region ( Guayama), 8–3, in the final.
- August 15 – 25: 2019 Little League World Series in (Pennsylvania) South Williamsport at both the Little League Volunteer Stadium and the Howard J. Lamade Stadium
  - Team USA Southwest Region ( (Louisiana) River Ridge) defeated Team Caribbean Region ( (Curaçao) Willemstad), 8–0, in the final.

=== Caribbean Series ===
- February 4 – 10: 2019 Caribbean Series in Panama City
  - (Panama) Toros de Herrera defeated (Cuba) Leñadores de Las Tunas, 3–1, to win their first Caribbean Series title.

== Basketball ==
=== National Basketball Association ===
- October 16, 2018 – April 10, 2019: 2018–19 NBA season
  - Eastern Conference Winners: (Ontario) Toronto Raptors
  - Western Conference Winners: (California) Golden State Warriors
  - Note: Milwaukee has home court advantage throughout entire playoffs. Golden State has home court advantage throughout conference playoffs.
- February 17: 2019 NBA All-Star Game at the Spectrum Center in Charlotte, North Carolina
  - Team LeBron defeated Team Giannis, with the score of 178–164.
  - MVP: (Washington, D.C.) Kevin Durant ( (California) Golden State Warriors)
  - NBA All-Star Celebrity Game: Home Team defeated Away Team, with the score of 82–80.
  - Rising Stars Challenge: The United States team defeated the (United Nations) World team, with the score of 161–141.
  - NBA All-Star Weekend Skills Challenge Winner: (Missouri) Jayson Tatum ( (Massachusetts) Boston Celtics)
  - Three-Point Contest Winner: (Washington (state)) Joe Harris ( (New York (state)) Brooklyn Nets)
  - Slam Dunk Contest Winner: (New York (state)) Hamidou Diallo ( Oklahoma City Thunder)
- April 13 – June 13: 2019 NBA playoffs
  - The (Ontario) Toronto Raptors defeated the (California) Golden State Warriors, 4–2 in games played, to win their first NBA title.
- June 20: 2019 NBA draft at the Barclays Center in (United States) Brooklyn
  - #1 pick: (North Carolina) Zion Williamson (to the (Louisiana) New Orleans Pelicans from the (North Carolina) Duke Blue Devils)

=== Women's National Basketball Association ===
- April 10: 2019 WNBA draft in (New York (state)) New York City at the Nike NYHQ
  - #1 pick: (Indiana) Jackie Young to the (Nevada) Las Vegas Aces, from the (Indiana) Notre Dame Fighting Irish team.
- May 24 – September 8: 2019 WNBA season (Regular)
  - Eastern Conference RS winners: (Washington, D.C.) Washington Mystics
  - Western Conference RS winners: (California) Los Angeles Sparks
- July 27: 2019 WNBA All-Star Game at Mandalay Bay Events Center in (Nevada) Las Vegas
  - Team Wilson defeated team Delle Donne, with the score of 129–126.
  - MVP: (Florida) Erica Wheeler ( Indiana Fever)
  - Three Point Contest winner: (Arkansas) Shekinna Stricklen ( Connecticut Sun)
  - Skills Challenge winner: (Florida) Diamond DeShields ( (Illinois) Chicago Sky)
- September 11 – October 10: 2019 WNBA Playoffs
  - The (Washington, D.C.) Washington Mystics defeated the Connecticut Sun, 3–2 in games won, to win their first WNBA title.

=== National Collegiate Athletic Association ===
- March 19 – April 8: 2019 NCAA Division I men's basketball tournament
  - The Virginia Cavaliers defeated the Texas Tech Red Raiders, 85–77 in overtime, to win their first NCAA Division I Men's Basketball title.
- March 22 – April 7: 2019 NCAA Division I women's basketball tournament
  - The (Texas) Baylor Lady Bears defeated the (Indiana) Notre Dame Fighting Irish, 82–81, to win their third NCAA Division I Women's Basketball title.

=== FIBA World Cup Events ===
- February 15 – 17: 2019 FIBA Intercontinental Cup in (Brazil) Rio de Janeiro
  - (Greece) AEK Athens defeated (Brazil) Flamengo, 86–70, to win their first FIBA Intercontinental Cup title.
  - (Argentina) San Lorenzo took third place and (United States) Austin Spurs took fourth place.
- June 18 – 23: 2019 FIBA 3x3 World Cup in (Netherlands) Amsterdam
  - Men: The United States defeated Latvia, 18–14, to win their first Men's FIBA 3x3 World Cup title.
    - Poland took third place.
  - Women: China defeated Hungary, 19–13, to win their first Women's FIBA 3x3 World Cup title.
    - France took third place.
- June 29 – July 7: 2019 FIBA Under-19 Basketball World Cup in (Greece) Heraklion
  - The United States defeated Mali, 93–79, to win their seventh FIBA Under-19 Basketball World Cup title.
  - France took third place.
- July 20 – 28: 2019 FIBA Under-19 Women's Basketball World Cup in (Thailand) Bangkok
  - The United States defeated Australia, 74–70 in overtime, to win their eighth FIBA Under-19 Women's Basketball World Cup title.
  - Spain took third place.
- August 31 – September 15: 2019 FIBA Basketball World Cup in China
  - Spain defeated Argentina, 95–75, to win their second FIBA Basketball World Cup title.
  - France took third place. Australia took fourth place.
  - Note: All four teams mentioned above, along with the United States, Nigeria, & Iran, have qualified to compete at the 2020 Summer Olympics.

=== 2019 FIBA 3x3 World Tour ===
- April 18 & 19: 3x3 WT #1 in (Qatar) Doha
  - Team (Latvia) Riga Ghetto defeated Team (Serbia) Liman, 15–14, to win their first World Tour event this year.
- June 1 & 2: 3x3 WT #2 in (China) Chengdu
  - Team (Serbia) Novi Sad defeated Team (Latvia) Riga, 21–14, to win their first World Tour event this year.
- July 6 & 7: 3x3 WT #3 in Mexico City
  - Team (Serbia) Novi Sad defeated Team (United States) NY Harlem, 21–11, to win their second World Tour event this year.
- July 20 & 21: 3x3 WT #4 in (Canada) Saskatoon
  - Team (Slovenia) Piran defeated Team (Serbia) Vrbas, 21–14, to win their first World Tour event this year.
- August 3 & 4: 3x3 WT #5 in (Czech Republic) Prague
  - Team (Latvia) Riga Ghetto defeated Team (United States) Princeton, 21–12, to win their second World Tour event this year.
- August 23 & 24: 3x3 WT #6 in (Switzerland) Lausanne
  - Team (United States) NY Harlem defeated Team (United States) Princeton, 21–15, to win their first World Tour event this year.
- August 27 & 28: 3x3 WT #7 in (Hungary) Debrecen
  - Team (Serbia) Liman defeated Team (Latvia) Riga Ghetto, 21–18, to win their first World Tour event this year.
- September 7 & 8: 3x3 WT #8 in (Canada) Montreal
  - Team (Lithuania) Šakiai Gulbelė defeated Team (Canada) Edmonton, 21–14, to win their first World Tour event this year.
- September 21 & 22: 3x3 WT #9 in (United States) Los Angeles
  - Team (United States) Princeton defeated Team (Serbia) Liman, 16–11, to win their first World Tour event this year.
- October 12 & 13: 3x3 WT #10 in (China) Nanjing
  - Team (Canada) Edmonton defeated Team (Lithuania) Šakiai Gulbelė, 21–17, to win their first World Tour event this year.
- October 18 & 19: 3x3 WT #11 in (Saudi Arabia) Jeddah
  - Team (Latvia) Riga Ghetto defeated Team (Serbia) Liman, 21–18, to win their third World Tour event this year.
- November 2 & 3: 3x3 WT #12 (final) in (Japan) Utsunomiya
  - Team (Serbia) Novi Sad defeated Team (United States) Princeton, 21–17, to win their third World Tour event this year.

=== FIBA Europe ===
National teams

- June 27 – July 7: FIBA Women's EuroBasket 2019 in Serbia & Latvia
  - Spain defeated France, 88–66, to win their second consecutive and fourth overall FIBA Women's EuroBasket title.
  - Serbia took third place. Great Britain took fourth place. Belgium took fifth place. Sweden took sixth place.
  - Note: All teams mentioned above have qualified to compete at the 2020 FIBA World Olympic Qualifying Tournament.
- July 5 – 14: 2019 FIBA U18 Women's European Championship Division B in (North Macedonia) Skopje
  - Finland defeated Greece, 63–56, to win their first FIBA U18 Women's European Championship Division B title.
  - Turkey took third place.
- July 6 – 14 2019 FIBA U18 Women's European Championship in (Bosnia and Herzegovina) Sarajevo
  - Italy defeated Hungary, 70–62, to win their second FIBA U18 Women's European Championship title.
  - France took third place.
- July 12 – 21: 2019 FIBA Europe Under-20 Championship Division B in Matosinhos
  - Portugal defeated the Czech Republic, 73–57, to win their first FIBA Europe Under-20 Championship Division B title.
  - Belgium took third place.
- July 13 – 21: 2019 FIBA Europe Under-20 Championship in Tel Aviv
  - Israel defeated Spain, 92–84, to win their second consecutive FIBA Europe Under-20 Championship title.
  - Germany took third place.
- July 14 – 21: 2019 FIBA Europe Under-16 Championship Division C in (Albania) Tirana
  - Luxembourg defeated Andorra, 78–50, to win their second FIBA Europe Under-16 Championship Division C title.
  - Wales took third place.Division C
- July 16 – 21: 2019 FIBA Europe Under-16 Championship for Women Division C in (Moldova) Chișinău
  - Cyprus defeated Georgia, 75–38, to win their third FIBA Europe Under-16 Championship for Women Division C title.
  - Scotland took third place.
- July 26 – August 4: 2019 FIBA Europe Under-18 Championship Division B in (Romania) Oradea
  - Israel defeated Poland, 81–79, to win their first FIBA Europe Under-18 Championship Division B title.
  - The Czech Republic took third place.
- July 27 – August 4: 2019 FIBA U18 European Championship in (Greece) Volos
  - Spain defeated Turkey, 57–53, to win their fourth FIBA U18 European Championship title.
  - Slovenia took third place.
- July 28 – August 4: 2019 FIBA Europe Under-18 Championship Division C in Andorra la Vella
  - Cyprus defeated Monaco, 67–59, to win their second FIBA Europe Under-18 Championship Division C title.
  - Albania took third place.
- July 30 – August 4: 2019 FIBA Europe Under-18 Championship for Women Division C in Andorra la Vella
  - Armenia defeated Malta, 79–73, to win their second FIBA Europe Under-18 Championship for Women Division C title.
  - Georgia took third place.
- August 3 – 11: 2019 FIBA U20 Women's European Championship in (Czech Republic) Klatovy
  - Italy defeated Russia, 70–67, to win their first FIBA U20 Women's European Championship title.
  - France took third place.
- August 3 – 11: 2019 FIBA Europe Under-20 Championship for Women Division B in (Kosovo) Pristina
  - Bulgaria defeated Finland, 80–75, to win their first FIBA Europe Under-20 Championship for Women Division B title.
  - Ireland took third place.
- August 8 – 17: 2019 FIBA Europe Under-16 Championship Division B in (Montenegro) Podgorica
  - Poland defeated the Netherlands, 71–58, to win their second FIBA Europe Under-16 Championship Division B title.
  - Denmark took third place.
- August 9 – 17: 2019 FIBA U16 European Championship in Udine
  - Spain defeated France, 70–61, to win their fifth FIBA Europe Under-16 Championship title.
  - Italy took third place.
- August 15 – 24: 2019 FIBA Europe Under-16 Championship for Women Division B in (Bulgaria) Sofia
  - Slovenia defeated Portugal, 71–56, to win their first IBA Europe Under-16 Championship for Women Division B title.
  - Croatia took third place.
- August 22 – 30: 2019 FIBA U16 Women's European Championship in (North Macedonia) Skopje
  - Russia defeated Lithuania, 73–66, to win their sixth FIBA U16 Women's European Championship title.
  - Spain took third place.
- August 30 – September 1: 2019 FIBA 3x3 Europe Cup in (Hungary) Debrecen
  - Men: Serbia defeated France, 21–18, to win their second consecutive Men's FIBA 3x3 Europe Cup title.
    - Lithuania took third place.
  - Women: France defeated Spain, 14–12, to win their second consecutive Women's FIBA 3x3 Europe Cup title.
    - Latvia took third place.
- September 6 – 8: 2019 FIBA 3x3 Under-18 Europe Cup in (Georgia (country)) Tbilisi
  - Men: Lithuania defeated France, 21–14, in the final. Israel took third place.
  - Women: Spain defeated Germany, 17–16, in the final. Russia took third place.

Club teams

- September 20, 2018 – May 1: 2018–19 FIBA Europe Cup
  - (Italy) Dinamo Sassari defeated (Germany) s.Oliver Würzburg, 170–163 on aggregate, to win their first FIBA Europe Cup title.
- September 20, 2018 – May 5: 2018–19 Basketball Champions League
  - (Italy) Segafredo Virtus Bologna defeated (Spain) Iberostar Tenerife, 73–61, to win their first Basketball Champions League title.
  - (Belgium) Telenet Antwerp Giants took third place.
- October 3, 2018 – April 15: 2018–19 EuroCup Basketball
  - (Spain) Valencia Basket defeated (Germany) Alba Berlin, 2–1 in games played, to win their fourth EuroCup Basketball title.
- October 8, 2018 – April 10: 2018–19 EuroCup Women
  - (Russia) Nadezhda Orenburg defeated (France) Lattes Montpellier, 146–132 on aggregate, to win their first EuroCup Women title.
- October 9, 2018 – April 14: 2018–19 EuroLeague Women
  - (Russia) UMMC Ekaterinburg defeated fellow Russian team, Dynamo Kursk, 91–67, to win their second consecutive and fifth overall EuroLeague Women title.
  - (Czech Republic) ZVVZ USK Praha took third place.
- October 11, 2018 – May 19: 2018–19 EuroLeague
  - (Russia) CSKA Moscow defeated (Turkey) Anadolu Efes, 91–83, to win their eighth EuroLeague title.
  - (Spain) Real Madrid took third place.

League events

- September 25, 2018 – April 15: 2018–19 Alpe Adria Cup
  - (Hungary) Egis Körmend defeated (Croatia) Adria Oil Škrljevo, 159–147 on aggregate, to win their first Alpe Adria Cup title.
- September 27, 2018 – March 10: 2018–19 Baltic Women's Basketball League
  - In the final, (Latvia) TTT Riga defeated (Lithuania) Aistes LSU Kaunas, 76–62, to win their 1st Baltic Women's Basketball League.
  - (Lithuania) Kibirkstis Vilnius took third place and (Estonia) Tallinn University Women took fourth place.
- September 27, 2018 – April 8: 2018–19 ABA League Second Division
  - (Slovenia) Sixt Primorska defeated (North Macedonia) MZT Skopje Aerodrom, 3–0 in legs played, to win their first ABA League Second Division title.
- September 28, 2018 – April 6: 2018–19 Latvian–Estonian Basketball League (debut event)
  - (Latvia) BK Ventspils defeated fellow Latvian team, BK VEF Rīga, 102–80, to win the inaugural Latvian–Estonian Basketball League title.
  - (Estonia) BC Kalev took third place.
- September 28, 2018 – April 22: 2018–19 ABA League First Division
  - (Serbia) Crvena zvezda mts defeated (Montenegro) Budućnost VOLI, 3–2 in legs played, to win their fourth ABA League First Division title.
- October 3, 2018 – March 17: 2018–19 EWBL
  - (Latvia) TTT Riga defeated (Belarus) Tsmoki-Minsk, 73–63, to win their second EWBL title.
  - (Russia) Rostov-Don took third place.
- October 3, 2018 – March 24: 2018–19 WABA League
  - (Bulgaria) Beroe defeated (Montenegro) Budućnost Bemax, 65–64, to win their first WABA League title.
  - (Slovenia) Cinkarna Celje took third place.
- October 16, 2018 – April 7: 2018–19 BIBL
  - (North Macedonia) KK Blokotehna defeated (Albania) Teuta, 82–68, to win their first BIBL title.
  - (Bulgaria) Academic Bultex 99 took third place.
- November 29, 2018 – April 7: 2018–19 Junior ABA League
  - (Croatia) Cibona U19 defeated (Serbia) Crvena zvezda U19, 73–68, to win their first Junior ABA League title.
  - (Bosnia and Herzegovina) Igokea U19 took third place.

=== FIBA Americas ===
National teams

- June 3 – 9: 2019 FIBA Under-16 Americas Championship in (Brazil) Belém
  - The United States defeated Canada, 94–77, to win their sixth consecutive FIBA Under-16 Americas Championship title.
  - The Dominican Republic took third place. Argentina took fourth place.
  - Note: All teams mentioned above have qualified to compete at the 2020 FIBA Under-17 Basketball World Cup.
- June 16 – 22: 2019 FIBA Under-16 Women's Americas Championship in Puerto Aysén
  - The United States defeated Canada, 87–37, to win their second consecutive and fifth overall FIBA Under-16 Women's Americas Championship title.
  - Chile took third place. Puerto Rico took fourth place.
  - Note: All teams mentioned above have qualified to compete at the 2020 FIBA Under-17 Women's Basketball World Cup.
- September 22 – 29: 2019 FIBA Women's AmeriCup in (Puerto Rico) San Juan
  - The United States defeated Canada, 67–46, to win their third FIBA Women's AmeriCup title.
  - Brazil took third place.
  - Note: The first eight teams have qualified to compete at the Americas 2020 Olympic pre-qualifying tournaments.

Club teams

- January 18 – March 31: 2019 FIBA Americas League
  - (Argentina) San Lorenzo defeated (Venezuela) Guaros, 64–61, to win their second consecutive FIBA Americas League title.

=== FIBA Asia ===
National teams

- May 24 – 26: 2019 FIBA 3x3 Asia Cup in Changsha
  - Men: Australia defeated Mongolia, 21–9, to win their second consecutive FIBA 3x3 Asia Cup title.
    - China took third place.
  - Women: Australia defeated Kazakhstan, 20–9, to win their second FIBA 3x3 Asia Cup title.
    - Japan took third place.
- September 24 – 29: 2019 FIBA Women's Asia Cup in (India) Bengaluru
  - Japan defeated China, 71–68, to win their fourth consecutive and fifth overall FIBA Women's Asia Cup title.
  - Australia took third place.
  - Note: All eight teams in this tournament has qualified to compete at the Asia/Oceania 2020 Olympic pre-qualifying tournaments.
- October 22 – 28: 2019 FIBA Under-16 Women's Asian Championship
- TBA: 2019 FIBA Under-16 Asian Championship

Club teams

- November 16, 2018 – May 15, 2019: 2018–19 ABL season
  - BTN CLS Knights Indonesia defeated Singapore Slingers, 3–2 in a 5-leg final, to win their first ASEAN Basketball League title.
- February 19 – 24: SEABA Club Championship for men and women in (Indonesia) Surabaya
  - Men: (Indonesia) West Bandits Jakarta defeated (Indonesia) Mahameru Surabaya, 90–61.
  - Women: (Indonesia) Surabaya Fever defeated (Thailand) Shoot It Dragons, 68–66.
- September 24 – 29: 2019 FIBA Asia Champions Cup in (Thailand) Bangkok
  - (Japan) Alvark Tokyo defeated (Lebanon) Al Riyadi Beirut, 98–74, to win their first FIBA Asia Champions Cup title.
  - (Iran) Palayesh Naft Abadan BC took third place.

=== FIBA Africa ===
National teams

- July 5 – 14: 2019 FIBA Under-16 African Championship in (Cape Verde) Praia
  - Egypt defeated Mali, 66–57, to win their fourth FIBA Under-16 African Championship title.
  - Nigeria took third place.
  - Note: Egypt and Mali both qualified to compete at the 2020 FIBA Under-17 Basketball World Cup.
- July 28 – August 3: 2019 FIBA Under-16 Women's African Championship in (Rwanda) Kigali
  - Mali defeated Egypt, 84–48, to win their sixth FIBA Under-16 Women's African Championship title.
  - Angola took third place.
- August 9 – 18: 2019 Women's Afrobasket in Dakar
  - Nigeria defeated Senegal, 60–55, to win their second consecutive and fourth overall Women's Afrobasket title.
  - Mali took third place.

Club teams

- February 8 – May 26: 2018–19 Africa Basketball League
  - (Angola) Primeiro de Agosto defeated (Morocco) AS Salé, 83–71, to win their ninth Africa Basketball League title.
  - (Egypt) Smouha SC took third place.
- TBA for November: 2019 FIBA Africa Women's Clubs Champions Cup

=== FIBA Oceania ===
- August 19 – 24: 2019 FIBA Oceania Under-17 Championship for Men & Women in (France) / (New Caledonia) Nouméa
  - Men: Australia defeated New Zealand, 85–56, to win their sixth consecutive FIBA Oceania Under-17 Championship title.
    - Samoa took third place.
  - Women: Australia defeated New Zealand, 88–41, in the final.
    - Tahiti took third place.

== Bowling ==
World events

- March 17 – 24: World Bowling Junior Championships in (France) Paris (debut event)
  - Singles winners: (South Korea) Ji Geun (m) / (Singapore) Arianne Tay (f)
  - Doubles winners: South Korea (Donghyuk Park & Ji Geun) (m) / United States 1 (Kamerin Peters & Mabel Cummins)
  - Team winners: South Korea 1 (Youngseon Jeong, Ji Geun, Donghyuk Park, Soree Hong)
- August 22 – 30: 2019 WTBA World Tenpin Bowling Championships in (United States) Las Vegas
- September 2 – 10: World Senior Championships in (United States) Las Vegas

Asian events

- April 17 – 25: 20th Asian Youth Tenpin Bowling Championships in (Malaysia) Kuching
  - Singapore won both gold and overall medal tallies.
- July 6 – 12: 20th Asian School Tenpin Bowling Championships in Hong Kong
  - Japan won both gold and overall medal tallies.
- October 20 – 30: 25th Asian Tenpin Bowling Championships in Kuwait
- November 12 – 20: 33rd Asian Intercity Bowling Championships in (Vietnam) Ho Chi Minh City

=== PBA ===
2019 PBA Tour season

- February 5 – 9: PBA Tournament of Champions in (Ohio) Fairlawn
  - Winner: (Australia) Jason Belmonte (10th major)
- February 12 – 16: PBA Players Championship in (Ohio) Columbus
  - Winner: (United States) Anthony Simonsen (6th major)
- March 12 – 21: PBA World Championship in (Michigan) Allen Park
  - Winner: (Australia) Jason Belmonte (11th major)
- March 26 – 31: USBC Masters in (Nevada) Las Vegas
  - Winner: (United States) Jakob Butturff (1st major)
- October 23 – 29: U.S. Open in (North Carolina) Mooresville

=== PWBA ===
- May 15 – 21: USBC Queens in (Kansas) Wichita
  - Winner: (Ukraine) Dasha Kovalova (1st major)
- June 16 – 23: U.S. Women's Open in (Nevada) Las Vegas
  - Winner: (United States) Danielle McEwan (2nd major)
- August 21 – 24: PWBA Players Championship in (North Carolina) Raleigh
- September 15 – 18: PWBA Tour Championship in (Virginia) Richmond

== Bowls ==
=== World Bowls Tour ===
- November 3 – 10, 2018: The Scottish International Open 2018 in (Scotland) Perth
  - In the final, (Scotland) Paul Foster defeated (Scotland) Stewart Anderson, 6,8–4,12.

=== World and International Championships ===
- January 4 – 15: 2019 International Deaf Bowlers Championship in Christchurch
  - Final Positions: 1st. Australia, 2nd. New Zealand, 3rd. Scotland, 4th. Northern Ireland, 5th. Wales, 6th. Ireland
- January 10 – 27: 2019 World Indoor Bowls Championship in (England) Hopton-on-Sea
  - Open Singles: (Scotland) Stewart Anderson
  - Women's Singles: (Scotland) Julie Forrest
  - Open Pairs: (Scotland) Paul Foster & Alex Marshall
  - Mixed Pairs: (England) Robert Paxton & Ellen Falkner
  - Open Under-25: (Scotland) John Orr
- March 5 – 13: 2019 World Cup Singles in (Australia) Shellharbour
  - Winners: (Northern Ireland) Gary Kelly (m) / (New Zealand) Jo Edwards (f)
  - 2nd place: (Malta) Brendan Aquilina (m) / (Guernsey) Lucy Beere (f)
  - 3rd place: (Australia) Jeremy Henry & (Scotland) John Fleming (m) / (Malaysia) Siti Zalina Ahmad & (Australia) Rebecca Van Asch
- June 18 – 28: 2019 Asia Pacific Bowls Championships in Gold Coast
  - Singles winners: (New Zealand) Shannon McIlroy (m) / (New Zealand) Jo Edwards (f)
  - Pairs winners: New Zealand (m) / Australia (f)
  - Triples winners: Australia (m) / Australia (f)
  - Fours winners: Australia (m) / New Zealand (f)
- October 28 – November 3: 2019 World Singles Champion of Champions in (Australia) Adelaide

== Canadian football ==
- November 24 – 107th Grey Cup: Winnipeg Blue Bombers defeat Hamilton Tiger-Cats, 33–12.

== Chess ==
=== FIDE Grand Prix 2019 ===
- May 17 – 29: GP #1 in (Russia) Moscow Winner: (Russia) Ian Nepomniachtchi
- July 11 – 17: GP #2 in (Latvia) Riga Winner: (Azerbaijan) Shakhriyar Mamedyarov
- November 4 – 18: GP #3 in (Germany) Hamburg Winner: (Russia) Alexander Grischuk
- December 10 – 24: GP #4 in (Israel) Jerusalem (final) Winner: (Russia) Ian Nepomniachtchi

=== FIDE Women's Grand Prix 2019-20 ===
- September 10 – 23: WGP #1 in (Russia) Krasnodar Winner: (India) Humpy Koneru
- December 2 – 15: WGP #2 in Monaco Winners: (India) Humpy Koneru, (Russia) Alexandra Kosteniuk, (Russia) Aleksandra Goryachkina
- March 1–14: WGP #3 in (Switzerland) Lausanne Winners: (Georgia (country)) Nana Dzagnidze, (Russia) Aleksandra Goryachkina
- May 2–15: WGP #4 in (Italy) Sardinia Postponed due to the COVID-19 pandemic

=== World Events ===
- February 1 – August 1: 7th FIDE World Cup in Composing
- March 4 – 15: 2019 World Team Chess Championship in (Kazakhstan) Astana
  - Winners: Russia (Sergey Karjakin, Alexander Grischuk, Dmitry Andreikin, Vladislav Artemiev) (m) / China (Tan Zhongyi, Huang Qian, Lei Tingjie, Ding Yixin) (f)
- April 15 – 25: World Senior Team Championships 50+ & 65+ in (Greece) Rhodes
  - Winners: United States (Alexander Shabalov, Joel Benjamin, Igor Novikov, Jaan Ehlvest, Alex Yermolinsky (50+) / Russia (Evgeny Sveshnikov, Yuri Balashov, Nukhim Rashkovsky, Vladimir V. Zhelnin, Nikolai Pushkov) (65+)
- April 17 – 27: World School Individual Championships in (Turkey) Antalya
  - U7 winners: (India) Dolas Aarush (b) / (Kazakhstan) Amanzhol Khanzada (g)
  - U9 winners: (Uzbekistan) Begmuratov Khumoyun (b) / (Kazakhstan) Kaliakhmet Elnaz (g)
  - U11 winners: (Belarus) Silich Yahor (b) / (Mongolia) Enkhrii Enkh-Amgalan (g)
  - U13 winners: (Turkey) Camlar Arda (b) / (Mongolia) Bayasgalan Khishigbaatar (g)
  - U15 winners: (Uzbekistan) Sindarov Javokhir (b) / (Kazakhstan) Nurgali Nazerke (g)
  - U17 winners: (Uzbekistan) Yakubboev Nodirbek (b) / (Mongolia) Ulziikhishigjargal Ochirkhuyag (g)
- May 29 – June 19: Women's Candidates Tournament in (Russia) Kazan
  - Winners: 1st. (Russia) Aleksandra Goryachkina, 2nd. (Ukraine) Anna Muzychuk, 3rd. (Russia) Kateryna Lagno
- June 29 – July 7: World Amateur Championship in Mexico City
  - U1700 winners: (Mexico) Jose Gua Cordova Valdivia (m) / (Russia) Kseniya Meremyanina
  - U2000 winner: (Kyrgyzstan) Islam Baisynov
  - U2300 winner: (Peru) Elias Renzo Gutierrez Medina
- July 9 – 15: 3rd World Junior Chess Championship for the Disabled 2019 in (United States) Cherry Hill
  - Winners: 1st (Russia) Ilia Liplin, 2nd. (India) Samarth Jagadish Rao, 3rd. (Russia) Maksim Petrov
- August 15 – 19: World Cadet U8, U10, U12 Rapid & Blitz Chess Championships in (Belarus) Minsk
- August 20 – September 2: World Cadet U8, 10, 12 Chess Championship in (China) Weifang
- September 9 – October 2: World Cup 2019 in (Russia) Khanti-Mansiysk
- September 10 – 14: World Youth U14, U16, U18 Rapid & Blitz Chess Championships in (Spain) Salobrena
- October 1 – 13: World Youth U14, 16, 18 Chess Championship in (India) Mumbai
- October 14 – 26: World Junior and Girls U20 Chess Championship in (India) New Delhi
- October 28 – November 6: World Youth U-16 Chess Olympiad in (Turkey) Çorum
- November 11 – 24: World Senior Championship in (Romania) Bucharest
- November 26 – December 4: 1st FIDE World Disabled Cadet and Youth Chess Championships 2019 in (Wales) Cardiff (debut event)

== Cricket ==
Twenty20 International

- January 20 – 24: 2019 ACC Western Region T20 in Oman
  - In the final, Saudi Arabia defeated Qatar, 163/2 (15.3 overs)–157/6 (20 overs).
  - Saudi Arabia won by 8 wickets.
- February 9 – 17: 2018–19 Oman Quadrangular Series in Oman
  - Round Robin Final Positions: 1st. Scotland, 2nd. Netherlands, 3rd. Ireland, 4th. Oman
- February 18 – 27: 2019 ICC Women's Qualifier Asia in Thailand
  - Round Robin Final Clasament: 1st. Thailand, 2nd. Nepal, 3rd. United Arab Emirates, 4th. China, 5th. Hong Kong, 6th. Malaysia, 7th. Kuwait
- March 18 – 25: 2018–19 ICC World Twenty20 East Asia-Pacific Qualifier § Regional Finals in Papua New Guinea
  - Round Robin Final Positions: 1st. Papua New Guinea, 2nd. Philippines, 3rd. Vanuatu
- May 5 – 12: 2019 ICC Women's Qualifier Africa in Zimbabwe
  - In the final, Zimbabwe defeated Namibia, 114/5 (20 overs)-64/9 (20 overs).
  - Zimbabwe won by 50 runs.
- May 6 – 12: 2019 ICC Women's Qualifier EAP in Vanuatu
  - Round Robin Final Positions: 1st. Papua New Guinea, 2nd. Samoa, 3rd. Vanuatu, 4th. Indonesia, 5th. Japan, 6th. Fiji
- May 17 – 19: 2019 ICC Women's Qualifier Americas in the United States
  - United States defeated Canada 3–0 in the three-match series that formed the Qualifier.
- May 17 – 26: 2018–19 ICC World Twenty20 Africa Qualifier § Regional Finals in Uganda
  - Round Robin Final Positions: 1st. Namibia, 2nd. Kenya, 3rd. Nigeria, 4th. Uganda, 5th. Botswana, 6th. Ghana
- June 13 – 21: 2018–19 ICC World Twenty20 Europe Qualifier § Regional Finals in Guernsey
  - Round Robin Final Positions: 1st. Jersey, 2nd. Germany, 3rd. Italy, 4th. Denmark, 5th. Guernsey, 6th. Norway
- June 24 – 30: 2019 ICC Women's Qualifier Europe in Spain
  - Round Robin Final Positions: 1st. Netherlands, 2nd. Scotland, 3rd. Germany
- July 22 – July 28: 2018–19 ICC World Twenty20 Asia Qualifier § Regional Finals in Singapore
  - Round Robin Final Positions: 1st. Singapore, 2nd. Qatar, 3rd. Nepal, 4th. Kuwait, 5th. Malaysia
- August 15 – 25: 2018–19 ICC World Twenty20 Americas Qualifier § Regional Finals in Bermuda
  - Round Robin Final Positions: 1st. Canada, 2nd. Bermuda, 3rd. United States, 4th. Cayman Islands

List A

- April 18 – 28: 2019 ICC World Cricket League Division Two in Namibia
  - Final Positions: 1st. Namibia, 2nd. Oman, 3rd. Papua New Guinea, 4th. United States, 5th. Canada, 6th. Hong Kong

One Day International

- May 5 – 17: 2019 Ireland Tri-Nation Series in Ireland
  - In the final, Bangladesh defeated West Indies, 213/5 (22.5 overs)-152/1 (24 overs)
  - Bangladesh won by 5 wickets (DLS method)
- May 30 – July 14: 2019 Cricket World Cup in England and Wales
  - In the final, England and New Zealand, tied 241 (50 overs)-241/8 (50 overs).
  - In the Super Over, England scored 15/0 and New Zealand scored 15/1. England won on boundaries (26–17).

Test cricket

- August 1 – September 16: 2019 Ashes series in England

== Dancesport ==
Grand Slam

- March 16 & 17: GS #1 in (Romania) Bucharest
  - Adult Latin winners: (Russia) Armen Tsaturyan & Svetlana Gudyno
  - Adult Standard winners: (Lithuania) Evaldas Sodeika & Ieva Žukauskaitė
- June 1 & 2: GS #2 in (Taiwan) Taipei
  - Adult Latin winners: (Russia) Armen Tsaturyan & Svetlana Gudyno
  - Adult Standard winners: (Lithuania) Evaldas Sodeika & Ieva Žukauskaitė
- July 13 & 14: GS #3 in (Italy) Rimini
  - Adult Latin winners: (Russia) Armen Tsaturyan & Svetlana Gudyno
  - Adult Standard winners: (Lithuania) Evaldas Sodeika & Ieva Žukauskaitė
- August 15 & 16: GS #4 in (Germany) Stuttgart
- October 25 & 26: GS #5 in (Russia) Moscow Region
- December 7 & 8: GS #6 in (China) Shanghai (final)

Grand Prix

- March 10: WDSF PD Super Grand Prix in (Japan) Tokyo
  - Adult Standard winners: (Moldova) Nikolay Darin & Natalia Seredina
- March 23 & 24: WDSF PD Super Grand Prix in (Italy) Pieve di Cento
  - Adult Latin winners: (Moldova) Gabriele Goffredo & Anna Matus
  - Adult Standard winners: (Denmark) Bjorn Bitsch & Ashli Williamson

World Open

- January 12 & 13: WO #1 in (Spain) Benidorm
  - Adult Latin winners: (Hungary) Andrea Silvestri & Martina Varadi
  - Adult Standard winners: (Lithuania) Evaldas Sodeika & Ieva Žukauskaitė
- January 19: WO #2 in (Italy) Montecatini Terme
  - Adult Standard winners: (Lithuania) Evaldas Sodeika & Ieva Žukauskaitė
- January 26: WO #3 in (Germany) Pforzheim
  - Adult Latin winners: (Germany) Marius-Andrei Balan & Kristina Moshenska
- February 9 & 10: WO #4 in (Belgium) Antwerp
  - Adult Latin winners: (Russia) Anton Aldaev & Natalia Polukhina
  - Adult Standard winners: (Russia) Evgeny Nikitin & Anastasia Miliutina
- February 23: WO #5 in (Portugal) Lisbon
  - Adult Latin winners: (Estonia) Konstantin Gorodilov & Dominika Bergmannova
- March 9: WO #6 in (Czech Republic) Brno
  - Adult Standard winners: (Czech Republic) David Odstrčil & Tara Bohak
- March 9 & 10: WO #7 in (Ukraine) Kyiv
  - Adult Latin winners: (Germany) Marius-Andrei Balan & Kristina Moshenska
  - Adult Standard winners: (Estonia) Madis Abel & Aleksandra Galkina
- March 10: WO #8 in (Japan) Tokyo
  - Adult Standard winners: (Italy) Francesco Galuppo & Debora Pacini
- March 23 & 24: WO #9 in (Italy) Pieve di Cento
  - Adult Latin winners: (Russia) Armen Tsaturyan & Svetlana Gudyno
  - Adult Standard winners: (Italy) Francesco Galuppo & Debora Pacini
- March 30: WO #10 in (North Macedonia) Skopje
  - Adult Latin winners: (Bosnia and Herzegovina) Giacomo Lazzarini & Michelle Nazarenus
  - Adult Standard winners: (Latvia) Vadim Shurin & Anastasia Meshkova
- April 6 & 7: WO #11 in (Russia) Moscow
  - Adult Latin winners: (Russia) Armen Tsaturyan & Svetlana Gudyno
  - Adult Standard winners: (Russia) Evgeny Moshenin & Dana Spitsyna
- April 13 & 14: WO #12 in (Cyprus) Paphos
  - Adult Latin winners: (Bosnia and Herzegovina) Giacomo Lazzarini & Michelle Nazarenus
  - Adult Standard winners: (Cyprus) Daniil Ulanov & Kateryna Isakovych
- April 19: WO #13 in (Germany) Berlin
  - Adult Standard winners: (Estonia) Madis Abel & Aleksandra Galkina
- April 20 & 21: WO #14 in (Spain) Cambrils
  - Adult Latin winners: (Germany) Timur Imametdinov & Nina Bezzubova
  - Adult Standard winners: (Latvia) Edgars Linis & Eliza Ancane
- May 4 & 5: WO #15 in (Denmark) Copenhagen
  - Adult Latin winners: (Estonia) Konstantin Gorodilov & Dominika Bergmannova
  - Adult Standard winners: (Denmark) Dmitri Kolobov & Signe Busk
- May 5: WO #16 in (China) Shijiazhuang
  - Adult Latin winners: (Russia) Armen Tsaturyan & Svetlana Gudyno
  - Adult Standard winners: (Lithuania) Evaldas Sodeika & Ieva Zukauskaite
- May 18: WO #17 in (Armenia) Yerevan
  - Adult Latin winners: (Russia) Armen Tsaturyan & Svetlana Gudyno
- May 25: WO #18 in (France) Paris
  - Adult Standard winners: (Estonia) Madis Abel & Aleksandra Galkina
- June 1: WO #19 in (Hungary) Szombathely
  - Adult Latin winners: (Romania) Miculescu Ionut Alexandru & Pacurar Andra
- June 15: WO #20 in (Portugal) Vila do Conde
  - Adult Latin winners: (Russia) Semen Khrzhanovskiy & Elizaveta Lykhina
- June 15 & 16: WO #21 in (Albania) Tirana
  - Adult Latin winners: (Romania) Miculescu Ionut Alexandru & Pacurar Andra
  - Adult Standard winners: (Slovakia) Matteo Cicchitti & Simona Brecikova
- June 27 – 29: WO #22 in (Russia) Sochi
  - Adult Latin winners: (Russia) Armen Tsaturyan & Svetlana Gudyno
  - Adult Standard winners: (Russia) Evgeny Moshenin & Dana Spitsyna
- July 6 & 7: WO #23 in (Germany) Wuppertal
  - Adult Latin winners: (Germany) Marius-Andrei Balan & Khrystyna Moshenska
  - Adult Standard winners: (Estonia) Madis Abel & Aleksandra Galkina
- July 21: WO #24 in (China) Dalian
  - Adult Latin winners: (Russia) Armen Tsaturyan & Svetlana Gudyno
  - Adult Standard winners: (Italy) Francesco Galuppo & Debora Pacini
- August 30 & 31: WO #25 in (Thailand) Bangkok
- September 14 & 15: WO #26 in (Czech Republic) Prague
- September 21 & 22: WO #27 in (Slovakia) Bratislava
- October 5: WO #28 in (Czech Republic) Ostrava
- October 12 & 13: WO #29 in (Poland) Elbląg
- October 19 & 20: WO #30 in (Netherlands) Amsterdam
- October 19 & 20: WO #31 in (Ukraine) Kyiv
- November 2 & 3: WO #32 in (Romania) Sibiu
- November 9 & 10: WO #33 in (Poland) Warsaw
- November 23: WO #34 in (Estonia) Tallinn
- November 30: WO #35 in (Lithuania) Vilnius
- November 30 & December 1: WO #36 in (Slovenia) Maribor
- December 14 & 15: WO #37 in (Cyprus) Paphos
- December 14 & 15: WO #38 in (Latvia) Riga (final)

International competitions

- February 8: WDSF World Championship (Senior IV Standard) in (Belgium) Antwerp
  - 1st place: (Italy) Luciano Ceruti & Rosa Nuccia Cappello
  - 2nd place: (Italy) Renato Sibillo & Anna Cartini
  - 3rd place: (Italy) Vittorio Guida & Fortuna Canta
- April 20: WDSF World Championship (Senior I Standard) in (Germany) Berlin
  - 1st place: (Russia) Dmitry Vorobiev & Oxana Skripnik
  - 2nd place: (Germany) Fabian Wendt & Anne Steinmann
  - 3rd place: (France) Corentin Normand & Laura Lozingue
- April 20: WDSF European Championship (Youth Latin) in (Moldova) Chișinău
  - 1st place: (Moldova) Vladislav Untu & Polina Baryshnikova
  - 2nd place: (Russia) German Pugachev & Ariadna Tishova
  - 3rd place: (Czech Republic) Marian Hlavac & Tereza Maturova

== Darts ==
=== Professional Darts Corporation ===
- December 13, 2018 – January 1: 2019 PDC World Darts Championship in (England) London
  - (Netherlands) Michael van Gerwen defeated (England) Michael Smith, 7–3
- February 1 – 3: 2019 Masters in (England) Milton Keynes
  - (Netherlands) Michael van Gerwen defeated (England) James Wade, 11–5
- February 7 – May 17: 2019 Premier League Darts at venues in England, Scotland, Ireland, Germany, Netherlands, Northern Ireland and Wales
  - (Netherlands) Michael van Gerwen defeated (England) Rob Cross, 11–5
- March 1 – 3: 2019 UK Open in (England) Minehead
  - (England) Nathan Aspinall defeated (England) Rob Cross, 11–5
- June 6 – 9: 2019 PDC World Cup of Darts in (Germany) Hamburg
  - Scotland defeated Ireland, 3–1
- July 20 – 28: 2019 World Matchplay in (England) Blackpool
  - (England) Rob Cross defeated (England) Michael Smith, 18–13
- October 6 – 12: 2019 World Grand Prix in (Republic of Ireland) Dublin
  - (Netherlands) Michael van Gerwen defeated (England) Dave Chisnall, 5–2
- October 19 – 20 : 2019 Champions League of Darts in (England) Leicester
  - (Netherlands) Michael van Gerwen defeated (Scotland) Peter Wright, 11–10
- October 24 – 27: 2019 European Championship in (Germany) Göttingen
  - (England) Rob Cross defeated (Wales) Gerwyn Price, 11–6
- November 1 – 3: 2019 World Series of Darts Finals in (Netherlands) Amsterdam
  - (Netherlands) Michael van Gerwen defeated (Netherlands) Danny Noppert, 11–2
- November 9 – 17: 2019 Grand Slam of Darts in (England) Wolverhampton
  - (Wales) Gerwyn Price defeated (Scotland) Peter Wright, 16–6
- November 22 – 24: 2019 Players Championship Finals in (England) Minehead
  - (Netherlands) Michael van Gerwen defeated (Wales) Gerwyn Price, 11–9
- November 24: 2019 PDC World Youth Championship Final in (England) Minehead
  - (England) Luke Humphries defeated (Czech Republic) Adam Gawlas, 6–0

=== British Darts Organisation ===
- January 5 – 13: 2019 BDO World Darts Championship in (England) Frimley Green
  - Men: (England) Glen Durrant defeated (England) Scott Waites, 7–3.
  - Women: (Japan) Mikuru Suzuki defeated (England) Lorraine Winstanley, 3–0.
- August 30 – September 1: 2019 World Trophy in (England) Blackburn
  - Men: (Wales) Jim Williams defeated (Netherlands) Richard Veenstra, 8–6.
  - Women: (England) Lisa Ashton defeated (Russia) Anastasia Dobromyslova, 6–2.
- October 23 – 28: 2019 World Masters in (England) Purfleet
  - Men: (Republic of Ireland) John O'Shea defeated (England) Scott Waites, 6–4.
  - Women: (England) Lisa Ashton defeated (Russia) Anastasia Dobromyslova, 5–4.

== Disc golf & Ultimate ==
Major World events

- May 6 – 11: WFDF 2019 European Beach Ultimate Championships in (Portugal) Portimão
  - United Kingdom, Russia and Sweden won 2 gold medals each. Spain won overall medal tally.
- June 13 – 16: WFDF 2019 Asia Oceanic Beach Ultimate Championships in Shirahama
  - Men's Division winners: Philippines
  - Women's Division winners: Japan
  - Mixed Division winners: Philippines
- June 29 – July 6: EUF 2019 European Ultimate Championship in (Hungary) Győr
  - Men winners: United Kingdom (Championship) / Finland (Spirit)
  - Women winners: Ireland (Championship) / Sweden (Spirit)
  - Mixed winners: United Kingdom (Championship) / Ireland (Spirit)
- June 14 – 17: WFDF 2019 All Africa Ultimate Championships in (South Africa) Johannesburg
  - In the final, (South Africa) UCT Flying Tigers defeated (South Africa) Ghost Ultimate, 12–7.
  - (South Africa) Catch-22 won the Spirit of the Game.
- July 13 – 20: WFDF 2019 World Under 24 Ultimate Championships in (Germany) Heidelberg
  - Men's, Women's and Mixed Division winners: United States
- July 23 – 27: WFDF 2019 Asia Oceanic Ultimate & Guts Championships in (China) Shanghai
  - Men winners: Japan
  - Women winners: Japan
  - Mixed winners: Philippines
- August 21 – 24: WFDF 2019 World Team Disc Golf Championships in (Estonia) Ida-Viru
- November 3 – 8: WFDF 2019 Pan American Ultimate Championships in (United States) Sarasota

=== Disc Golf Pro Tour ===
- February 28 – March 2: Memorial Championship in (Arizona) Scottsdale
  - Winners: (United States) Eagle Wynne McMahon (m) / (Finland) Eveliina Salonen (f)
- March 14 – 17: Waco Annual Charity Open in (Texas) Waco
  - Winners: (United States) Paul McBeth (m) / (United States) Catrina Allen (f)
- April 12 – 14: Jonesboro Open in (Arkansas) Jonesboro
  - Winners: (United States) Paul McBeth (m) / (United States) Page Pierce (f)
- June 21 – 23: Discraft Ledgestone Insurance Open in (Illinois) Eureka
  - Winners: (United States) Paul McBeth (m) / (United States) Page Pierce (f)
- July 26 – 28: Idlewild Open in (Kentucky) Burlington
- August 29 – September 1: MVP Open at Maple Hill in (Massachusetts) Leicester

=== PDGA Major Events ===
- March 27 – 30: National Collegiate Disc Golf Championship in (Georgia (U.S. state)) Appling
  - Individual winners: Mark Anderson (Missouri S&T) (m) / Madi Chitwood (Southern Arkansas)
  - Team winners: (Michigan) Ferris State (m) / (Southern Arkansas) (f)
  - Individual First Flight winner: Mitchell Crowley (Wisconsin–Platteville)
  - Team First Flight winners: (Virginia) Liberty University
  - Team Second Flight winners: (Michigan) Ferris State
- April 11 – 14: 2019 PDGA Amateur World Doubles Championships in (Texas) Mount Vernon
  - Advanced winners: (Texas) Jeff Plaisance & Jacob Horning (m) / (Texas) Mary Lippa & Amber Horsley (f)
  - Amateur Masters 40+ winners: (Texas) Kenneth Reagan & (California) Doug LaRhette
  - Amateur Masters 50+ winners: (Florida) Trevor Toenjes & Ben Champion
  - Amateur Masters 60+ winners: (Texas) Fred Needham & Michael England
  - Intermediate winners: (Texas) Ivan Torres & Salvador Robles
- June 7 – 9: 2019 PDGA United States Amateur Disc Golf Championship in (Michigan) Milford
  - Advanced winner: (Michigan) Kyle Klein
- June 22 – 29: 2019 PDGA Professional Masters Disc Golf World Championships in (Vermont) Jeffersonville
  - Pro Masters 40+ winners: (Georgia (U.S. state)) David Feldberg (m) / (North Carolina) Elaine King (f)
  - Pro Masters 50+ winner: (Oklahoma) Ron Convers
  - Pro Masters 55+ winners: (Oklahoma) Mitch McClellan (m) / (Florida) Pam(ouflage) Reineke (f)
  - Pro Masters 60+ winners: (Kentucky) David L. Greenwell (m) / (Nevada) Laurie Cloyes-Chupa (f)
  - Pro Masters 65+ winner: (West Virginia) Johnny Sias
  - Pro Masters 70+ winner: (Kentucky) Dr. Rick Voakes
  - Pro Masters 75+ winner: (Georgia (U.S. state)) Pete May
  - Pro Masters 80+ winner: (Virginia) Carlos Rigby
- July 9 – 13: 2019 PDGA Junior Disc Golf World Championships in (Kansas) Emporia
  - Junior ≤U18 winners: (Kentucky) Zach Arlinghaus (b) / (Texas) Melody Castruita (g)
  - Junior ≤15 winners: (Iowa) Gannon Buhr (b) / (South Carolina) Hope C. Brown (g)
  - Junior ≤12 winners: (New Mexico) Kolby Sanchez (b) / (Texas) Haley Castruita (g)
  - Junior ≤10 winners: (Connecticut) Wyatt Mahoney (b) / (Texas) Zoey Lynn Martinez (g)
  - Junior ≤8 winner: (Michigan) Kaidin Bell
- July 18 – 21: European Open in (Finland) Nokia
- July 20 – 27: 2019 PDGA Amateur Disc Golf World Championships in (Pennsylvania) York
- August 10 – 17: 2019 PDGA Professional Disc Golf World Championships in (Illinois) Peoria
- September 5 – 8: 2019 PDGA Tim Selinske US Masters in (Massachusetts) Leicester
- September 19 – 22: 2019 United States Women's Disc Golf Championships in (Virginia) Spotsylvania
- October 2 – 5: United States Disc Golf Championship in (South Carolina) Rock Hill

=== 2019 USA National Tour Events ===
- February 21 – 24: Las Vegas Challenge in (Nevada) Henderson
  - Winners: (Florida) Calvin Heimburg (m) / (Kansas) Paige Bjerkaas & (Minnesota) Catrina Allen (f)
- April 24 – 27: Dynamic Discs Glass Blown Open in (Kansas) Emporia
  - Winners: (California) Paul McBeth (m) / (Minnesota) Catrina Allen (f)
- May 17 – 19: Santa Cruz Masters Cup in (California) Santa Cruz
  - Winners: (California) Garrett Gurthie (m) / (Minnesota) Catrina Allen (f)
- June 7 – 9: Beaver State Fling in (Oregon) Estacada
  - Winners: (Colorado) Eagle Wynne McMahon (m) / (Texas) Paige Pierce (f)
- August 23 – 25: Delaware Disc Golf Challenge in Newark
- October 11 – 13: The Ed Headrick Disc Golf Hall of Fame Classic in (Georgia (U.S. state)) Appling

=== 2019 European Tour ===
- April 20 & 21: ET#1 – Dutch Open in (Netherlands) Rijswijk
  - Winners: (Austria) Stanislaus Amann (m) / (Estonia) Kristin Tattar (f)
  - Pro Masters 40+ winner: (Denmark) Thomas Rasmussen
  - Pro Masters 50+ winner: (France) Mehdi Boukarabila
  - Pro Masters 60+ winner: (Switzerland) Paul Francz
  - Advanced winner: (Germany) Michael Faber
- May 3 – 5: ET#2 – Bluebell Woods Open in (United Kingdom) Dunbar
  - Winners: (Estonia) Silver Lätt (m) / (Estonia) Kristin Tattar (f)
  - Pro Masters 40+ winners: (Switzerland) Samuel Baumgartner (m) / (United Kingdom) Sue Underwood (f)
  - Pro Masters 50+ winner: (France) Mehdi Boukarabila
  - Pro Masters 60+ winner: (Netherlands) Marion van Linden
  - Advanced winners: (United Kingdom) Noah Smithson (m) / (Norway) Merete Auestad (f)
  - Junior winner: (Iceland) Andri Fannar Torfason (default)
- May 18 & 19: ET#3 – Kokkedal Open in (Denmark) Kokkedal
  - Winners: (Norway) Håkon Kveseth (m) / (Estonia) Kristin Tattar (f)
  - Pro Masters 40+ winners: (Sweden) Anders Swärd (m) / (Norway) Lydie Hellgren (f)
  - Pro Masters 50+ winner: (France) Jean-Louis Tanghe
  - Pro Masters 60+ winner: (Estonia) Paul Kustala
  - Advanced winners: (Denmark) Sebastian Pauli (m) / (Norway) Merete Auestad (f) (default)
  - Junior winner: (Austria) Lea Schadenhofer (default)
- June 7 – 9: ET#4 – Sula Open in (Norway) Langevåg
  - Winners: (Finland) Juhani Vainio (m) / (Estonia) Kristin Tattar (f)
  - Pro Masters 40+ winner: (Netherlands) Bert Brader (m)
  - Pro Masters 50+ winner: (Belgium) Mehdi Boukarabila
  - Pro Masters 60+ winner: (Norway) Terje Rørmark
- June 15 & 16: ET#5 – Quarry Park Open in (United Kingdom) Leamington Spa
  - Winners: (Switzerland) Tony Ferro (m) / (Norway) Hanna Hugosson (f)
  - Pro Master 40+ winner: (United Kingdom) Sue Underwood
  - Advanced winners: (Iceland) Arnþór Finnsson (m) / (United Kingdom) Kelly Addison (f)
- June 22 – 24: ET#6 – Iceland Summer Solstice in Garðabær
  - Winners: (Iceland) Blær Örn Ásgeirsson (m) / (Iceland) Kolbrun Mist Palsdottir (f)
  - Pro Master 40+ winner: (Iceland) Eyþór Örn Eyjólfsson
  - Pro Master 60+ winner: (Iceland) Arni Leosson
  - Advanced winners: (Iceland) Arnþór Finnsson (m) / (Iceland) Guðrún Fjóla Guðmundsdóttir (f)
  - Junior winner: (Iceland) Andri Fannar Torfason (default)
- July 11 – 13: ET#7 – Estonian Open in (Estonia) Aegviidu
  - (United Kingdom) Kevin Jones (m) / (Estonia) Kristin Tattar (f)
- September 6 – 8: ET#8 – Nokia Open in (Finland) Nokia
- September 14 & 15: ET#9 – Creeksea Classic in (United Kingdom) Burnham-on-Crouch

== Field hockey ==
=== FIH ===
- Note: The Pro League replaced both the Men's FIH Hockey World League for Men and the Women's FIH Hockey World League for Women.
- January 19 – June 23: 2019 Men's FIH Pro League
  - Australia defeated Belgium 3–2 in the final to win the first FIH Pro League title.
  - The Netherlands took third place.
- January 26 – June 23: 2019 Women's FIH Pro League
  - The Netherlands defeated Australia 4–3 in a shoot-out after the final ended in a 2–2 draw to win the first FIH Pro League title.
  - Germany took third place.

=== EHF ===
Clubs teams

- October 5, 2018 – 2019: 2018–19 Euro Hockey League
  - In the final, (Belgium) Waterloo Ducks defeated (Germany) Rot-Weiss Köln 4–0. (Germany) Mannheimer HC took third place and (Spain) Real Club de Polo took fourth place.
- June 7 – 10: 2019 Men's EuroHockey Club Trophy in (Switzerland) Wettingen
  - In the final, (Wales) Cardiff & Met defeated (Belarus) Stroitel Brest, 4–3. (Switzerland) Rotweiss Wettingen took third place and (Ukraine) OKS Vinnitsa took fourth place.
- February 15 – 17: 2019 Men's EuroHockey Indoor Club Cup in (Austria) Vienna
  - In the final, (Sweden) Partille SC defeated (Austria) SV Arminen, 3–1. (Germany) Uhlenhorster HC took third place and (Russia) Dinamo Stroitel Ekaterinburg took fourth place.
- February 8 – 10: EuroHockey Indoor Club Trophy in (Croatia) Sveti Ivan Zelina
  - Round Robin: 1st. (Spain) C.H. SPV Complutense, 2nd. (Poland) Grunwald Poznań, 3rd. (Turkey) Gaziantep Polisgücü SK, 4th. (England) East Grinstead HC
- February 8 – 10: EuroHockey Indoor Club Challenge I in (Norway) Oslo
  - Round Robin: 1st. (Portugal) A.D. Lousada, 2nd. (Ireland) Three Rock Rovers, 3rd. (Scotland) Inverleith HC, 4th. (Italy) Hockey Team Bologna
- February 8 – 10: EuroHockey Indoor Club Challenge II in (Bulgaria) Varna
  - Round Robin: 1st. (Hungary) Soroksári HC, 2nd. (Bulgaria) FHC Akademik Plus Sofia, 3rd. (Slovenia) HK Triglav Predanovci, 4th. (Finland) HC Kilppari, 5th. (Serbia) HK Elektrovojvodina, 6th. (Georgia (country)) Club Adjara
- February 15 – 17: Women's EuroHockey Indoor Club Cup in (Germany) Hamburg
  - In the final, (Netherlands) LMHC Laren defeated (Russia) Dinamo Elektrostal, 3–1. (Germany) Der Club an der Alster took third place and (Spain) Club de Campo Villa de Madrid took fourth place.
- February 15 – 17: Women's EuroHockey Indoor Club Trophy in (Austria) Vienna
  - Round Robin: 1st. (Austria) SV Arminen, 2nd, (England) Bowdon Hockey Club, 3rd. (Czech Republic) SK Slavia Prague, 4th. (Croatia) HAHK Mladost
- February 15 – 17: Women's EuroHockey Indoor Club Challenge I in (France) Douai
  - Round Robin: 1st. (France) Douai HC, 2nd, (Turkey) Bolu Belediyesi Spor Kulübü, 3rd. (Bulgaria) FHC Akademik Plus Sofia, 4th. (Portugal) Lisbon Casuals HC
- February 16 & 17: Women's EuroHockey Indoor Club Challenge II in (Serbia) Belgrade
  - In the final, (Denmark) Copenhagen HC defeated (Georgia (country)) Kutaisi HC, 10–0. (Serbia) HK Bask took third place and (Finland) Porvoo HC took fourth place.
- April 19 – 22: 2019 EuroHockey Club Champions Cup in (Netherlands) Amstelveen
  - In the final, (Netherlands) Amsterdam defeated (Spain) Real Sociedad, 7–0. (Germany) Club an der Alster took third place and (Netherlands) Den Bosch took fourth place.
- April 19 – 22: 2019 Women's EuroHockey Club Trophy in (England) Rochester
  - In the final, (Spain) Club de Campo defeated (England) Holcombe, 3–1. (Belgium) Waterloo Ducks took third place and (Ireland) UCD took fourth place.
- April 19 – 22: Women's EuroHockey Club Challenge I in (France) Lille
  - In the final, (France) Lille MHC defeated (Scotland) Clydesdale Western, 3–1. (Belgium) Braxgata HC took third place and (Switzerland) Rotweiss Wettingen took fourth place.
- June 6 – 9: EuroHockey Club Challenge II in (Czech Republic) Prague
  - In the final, (Portugal) AD Lousada defeated (Gibraltar) Grammarians HC, 2–0. (Czech Republic) Slavia Prague took third place and (Slovakia) KPH Rača took fourth place.
- June 6 – 9: EuroHockey Club Challenge IV in Malta
  - In the final, (Norway) Kringsja SK defeated (Malta) Qormi HC, 3–0 in a shoot-out after the final ended in a 2–2 draw. (Gibraltar) Eagles HC took third place and (Hungary) Építők HC took fourth place.
- June 7 – 10: EuroHockey Club Challenge I in (Poland) Siemianowice Śląskie
  - In the 1st promotion playoff (Italy) HC Bra defeated (Wales) Whitchurch HC 6–0.
  - In the 2nd promotion playoff, (Italy) SG Amsicora ASD defeated (Denmark) Slagelse HC, 2–1 in a shoot-out after the match ended in a 3–3 draw.
  - HC Bra and SG Amsicora ASD were joint winners whilst Whitchurch HC and Slagelse HC were joint 3rd.
- June 7 – 9: EuroHockey Club Challenge III in (Turkey) Alanya
  - In the final, (Denmark) Copenhagen HC defeated (Ukraine) Zytomyrskyiv, 7–2. (Turkey) Gaziantep Polisgücü SK took third place and (Hungary) Soroksári–Olcote HC took fourth place.
- June 7 – 10: Women's EuroHockey Club Challenge II in (Austria) Vienna
  - In the final, (Italy) HF Lorenzoni Bra defeated (Wales) Swansea City HC, 2–1. (Italy) SG Amsicora ASD took third place and (Lithuania) Zuvedra Tauras took fourth place.
- June 7 – 10: Women's EuroHockey Club Challenge III in (Ukraine) Boryspil
  - In the final, (Czech Republic) HC 1972 Rakovník defeated (Croatia) HAHK Mladost, 4–0. (Ukraine) Kolos Boryspol took third place and (Croatia) HK Zelina took fourth place.

National teams

- January 11 – 13: EuroHockey Indoor Junior Championship in Vienna
  - In the final, Austria defeated Poland, after penalties, 4–3, original match ended 3–3. Switzerland took third place and Italy took fourth place.
- January 11 – 13: EuroHockey Indoor Junior Championship II in Paredes
  - Round Robin final placement: 1. Czech Republic, 2. Slovakia, 3. Portugal, 4. Sweden, 5. Ukraine, 6. Denmark, 7. Wales
- January 18 – 20: Women's EuroHockey Indoor Junior Championship in (Poland) Tarnowskie Góry
  - In the final, Russia defeated Austria, 5–2. Switzerland took third place and Turkey took fourth place.
- January 18 – 20: Women's EuroHockey Indoor Junior Championship II in Sveti Ivan Zelina
  - In the final, Sweden defeated Slovakia, 5–1. Wales took third place and Croatia took fourth place.
- July 3 – 6: EuroHockey5s U16 Championship for boys and girls in Wałcz
  - In the boys final, France defeated Austria, 4–0. Poland took third place and Switzerland took fourth place.
  - In the girls final, Poland defeated Switzerland, 3–1. France took third place and Austria took fourth place.
- July 4 – 6: EuroHockey5s U16 Championship II in Albena
  - In the final, Russia defeated Bulgaria, 10–1. Gibraltar took third place and Slovenia took fourth place.
- July 13 – 21: Women's EuroHockey Junior Championship in Valencia
  - In the final, Spain defeated Netherlands, 4–3 in a shoot-out after the final ended in a 1–1 draw. Ireland took third place and Belgium took fourth place.
- July 14 – 20: EuroHockey Junior Championship II in (Czech Republic) Plzeň
  - In the final, Scotland defeated Italy, 4–1. Wales took third place and Ukraine took fourth place.
- July 14 – 20: Women's EuroHockey Junior Championship II in Alanya
  - In the final, Scotland defeated Russia, 9–0. Ireland took third place and Turkey took fourth place.
- July 19 – 21: EuroHockey Junior Championship III in Vilnius
  - In the final, Wales defeated Ukraine, 4–3. Lithuania took third place.
- July 15 – 21: EuroHockey Junior Championship in Valencia
  - In the final, Germany defeated England, 5–3. Netherlands took third place and Spain took fourth place.
- July 28 – August 3: 2019 Men's EuroHockey Championship II in Cambrai
  - In the final, France defeated Russia, 4–0. Austria took third place and Poland took fourth place.
- July 28 – August 3: 2019 Men's EuroHockey Championship III in Gibraltar
  - In the final, Croatia defeated Switzerland, 5–4. Gibraltar took third place and Portugal took fourth place.
- July 28 – August 3: 2019 Women's EuroHockey Championship III in (Slovenia) Lipovci
  - In the final, France defeated Lithuania, 4–3. Switzerland took third place and Croatia took fourth place.
- August 16 – 25: 2019 Men's EuroHockey Nations Championship in Antwerp
  - In the final, Belgium defeated Spain, 5–0. Netherlands took third place and Germany took fourth place.
- August 6 – 11: 2019 Men's EuroHockey Championship IV in Helsinki
  - Round Robin: 1st. Hungary, 2nd. Finland, 3rd. Norway, 4th. Cyprus, 5th. Slovenia
- August 16 – 25: 2019 Women's EuroHockey Nations Championship in (Belgium) Antwerp
  - In the final, Netherlands defeated Germany, 2–0. Spain took third place and England took fourth place.
- August 4 – 10: 2019 Women's EuroHockey Championship II in Glasgow
  - In the final, Scotland defeated Italy, 2–1. Poland took third place and Austria took fourth place.

== Fistball ==
Continental and World Competitions

- January 11 & 12: EFA 2019 Women's Indoor Champions Cup in (Austria) Laakirchen
  - In the final, (Germany) TSV Dennach defeated (Austria) ASKÖ Laakirchen Papier, 4–2 (11–7, 8–11, 11–8, 11–9, 6–11, 11–5).
  - (Germany) TV Eibach 03 Nuremberg took third place and (Switzerland) TSV Jonah took fourth place.
- January 11 & 12: EFA 2019 Men's Indoor Champions Cup 2019 in (Switzerland) Diepoldsau
  - In the final, (Germany) TSV Pfungstadt defeated (Germany) VfK Berlin, 4–0 (11–3, 11–7, 11–6, 11–5).
  - (Austria) Vöcklabruck took third place and (Switzerland) Diepoldsau took fourth place.
- July 2 – 7: CSIT IFA 2019 Fistball Amateurs World Cup in (Spain) Tortosa (debut event)
  - In the final, (Germany) Union Waldburg defeated (Austria) Union Peilstein, 3–1 (12–10, 11–6, 7–11, 11–8)
  - (Switzerland) Faustball Flurlingen took third place.
- July 5 & 6: EFA 2019 Fistball Women's Champions Cup in (Austria) Laakirchen
  - In the final, (Germany) TSV Dennach defeated (Austria) Union Nussbach, 3–1 (7–11, 11–3, 11–4, 11–6).
  - (Switzerland) TSV Jonah took third place and (Germany) Ahlhorner SV took fourth place.
- July 6 & 7: EFA 2019 EFA Fistball Men's European Cup in (Germany) Kleindöttingen
  - In the final, (Germany) TSV Calw defeated (Switzerland) Faustall Widnau, 3–2 (8–11, 12–14, 11–7, 11–8, 15–13).
  - (Germany) TV Schweinfurt-Oberndorf took third place and (Austria) Union Compact Freistadt took fourth place.
- July 6 & 7: EFA 2019 Fistball Men's Champions Cup in (Germany) Pfungstadt
  - In the final, (Germany) TSV Pfungstadt defeated (Germany) VfK Berlin, 4–1 (1–11, 11–4, 11–7, 11–6, 11–6).
  - (Austria) Union Tigers Vöcklabruck took third place and (Switzerland) TSV Wigoltingen took fourth place.
- July 13 & 14: EFA 2019 U18 Men's & Women's European Championship in Hohenlockstedt
  - In the men's final, Germany defeated Austria, 3–2 (4–11, 11–9, 15–13, 8–11, 14–12).
  - In the women's final, Germany defeated Austria, 3–0 (11–6, 11–5, 11–8).
- July 18 – 20: EFA European Women's and Men's U21 Championship in (Czech Republic) Lázně Bohdaneč
  - In the men's U21 final, Germany defeated Austria, 3–0 (11–7, 11–3, 11–7).
  - In the women's final, Germany defeated Austria, 3–1 (11–8, 9–11, 11–7, 11–8).
- August 11 – 17: 2019 Men's Fistball World Championships in (Switzerland) Winterthur
- September 13 – 15: IFA 2019 Fistball World Tour Final in (Austria) Salzburg

== Floorball ==
- Women's World Floorball Championships
  - Champion: Sweden
- Men's U-19 World Floorball Championships
  - Champion: Czech Republic
- Champions Cup
  - Men's champion: (Finland) Classic
  - Women's champion: (Sweden) IKSU

== Golf ==
=== 2019 Men's major golf championships ===
- April 11 – 14: 2019 Masters Tournament in (Georgia (U.S. state)) Augusta, Georgia
  - Winner: (United States) Tiger Woods (5th Masters title, 15th major title, & 81st PGA Tour win)
- May 16 – 19: 2019 PGA Championship in (New York (state)) Farmingdale, New York
  - Winner: (United States) Brooks Koepka (2nd PGA Championship title, 4th major title, & 6th PGA Tour win)
- June 13 – 16: 2019 U.S. Open in Pebble Beach, California
  - Winner: (United States) Gary Woodland (first US Open title, first major title, & 4th PGA Tour win)
- July 18 – 21: 2019 Open Championship in (Northern Ireland) Portrush, County Antrim
  - Winner: (Republic of Ireland) Shane Lowry (first Open Championship title, first major title, & 2nd PGA Tour win)

=== 2019 World Golf Championship (WGC) ===
- February 21 – 24: 2019 WGC-Mexico Championship in Naucalpan at the Club de Golf Chapultepec
  - Winner: (United States) Dustin Johnson (second WGC-Mexico Championship win, 6th WGC win, & 20th PGA Tour win)
- March 27 – 31: 2019 WGC-Dell Technologies Match Play in Austin, Texas
  - Winner: (United States) Kevin Kisner (first WGC win & 3rd PGA Tour win)
- July 25 – 28: 2019 WGC-FedEx St. Jude Invitational in Memphis, Tennessee
  - Winner: (United States) Brooks Koepka (first WGC win & 7th PGA Tour win)
- October 31 – November 3: 2019 WGC-HSBC Champions in (China) Shanghai
  - Winner: (Northern Ireland) Rory McIlroy (third WGC win & 18th PGA Tour win)

=== 2019 Women's major golf championships ===
- April 4–7: 2019 ANA Inspiration in Rancho Mirage, California
  - Winner: (South Korea) Ko Jin-young (first major win and fourth LPGA win)
- May 30 – June 2: 2019 U.S. Women's Open in Charleston, South Carolina
  - Winner: (South Korea) Lee Jeong-eun (first major win and first LPGA win)
- June 20–23: 2019 Women's PGA Championship in Chaska, Minnesota
  - Winner: (Australia) Hannah Green (first major win and first LPGA win)
- July 25–28: 2019 Evian Championship in Évian-les-Bains, France
  - Winner: (South Korea) Ko Jin-young (second major win and fifth LPGA win)
- August 1–4: 2019 Women's British Open in Milton Keynes, England
  - Winner: (Japan) Hinako Shibuno (first major win and first LPGA win)

=== 2019 Senior major golf championships ===
- May 9 – 13: The Tradition in Hoover, Alabama
  - Note: Due to rain, the tournament's fourth round would be played on May 13 (Monday).
  - Winner: (United States) Steve Stricker (first Major win & fourth PGA Tour Champions win)
- May 23 – 26: Senior PGA Championship in (New York (state)) Rochester, New York
  - Winner: (United States) Ken Tanigawa (first Major win & second PGA Tour Champions win)
- June 27 – 30: U.S. Senior Open in Notre Dame, Indiana at Warren Golf Course
  - Winner: (United States) Steve Stricker (first Senior Open win, second Major win & fifth PGA Tour Champions win)
- July 11 – 14: Senior Players Championship in Akron, Ohio
  - Winner: (South Africa) Retief Goosen (first Senior Players win & first PGA Tour Champions win)
- July 25 – 28: Senior Open Championship in Lancashire, England
  - Winner: (Germany) Bernhard Langer (fourth Senior Open win, eleventh senior major win, and 40th PGA Tour Champions win)

=== 2019 Legends Tour (Senior women's major golf championships) ===
- May 16 – 19: 2019 U.S. Senior Women's Open in Southern Pines, North Carolina
  - Winner: (Sweden) Helen Alfredsson (first Major & Legends Tour win)
- October 14 – 16: 2019 Senior LPGA Championship in French Lick Township, Indiana
  - Winner: (Sweden) Helen Alfredsson (second Major & Legends Tour win)

=== Other golf events ===
- March 14 – 17: 2019 Players Championship
  - Winner: (Northern Ireland) Rory McIlroy (first Players Championship title & 15th PGA Tour victory)
- September 13 – 15: 2019 Solheim Cup in (Scotland) Auchterarder
  - Team Europe defeated (United States) Team USA, 14½–13½, to win their sixth Solheim Cup title.
- December 12 – 15: 2019 Presidents Cup in (Australia) Melbourne
  - (United States) Team USA defeated the (United Nations) International Team, 16–14, to win their eighth consecutive and eleventh overall Presidents Cup title.

== Handball ==
- January 10 – 27: 2019 World Men's Handball Championship in Denmark and Germany
  - Denmark defeated Norway, 31–22, to win their first World Men's Handball Championship title.
  - France took third place.
- April 10 – 14: 2019 IHF Inter-Continental Trophy in Pristina
  - Junior: Kosovo defeated Chinese Taipei, 30–26, to win their first IHF Inter-Continental Trophy title.
  - United States took third place.
  - Youth: Chinese Taipei defeated Nigeria, 27–26, to win their first IHF Inter-Continental Trophy title.
  - Kosovo took third place.
- June 8 – 16: 2019 IHF Emerging Nations Championship in (Georgia (country)) Tbilisi
  - Georgia defeated Cuba, 31–21, to win their first IHF Emerging Nations Championship title.
  - Bulgaria took third place.
- July 16 – 28: 2019 Men's Junior World Handball Championship in Spain
  - France defeated Croatia, 28–23, to win their second Men's Junior World Handball Championship title.
  - Egypt took third place.
- August 1 – 4: 2019 IHF Women's Super Globe in China
  - (Angola) 1º de Agosto defeated China National Club, 27–22, to win their first IHF Women's Super Globe title.
  - (Brazil) UnC Concórdia took third place.
- August 6 – 18: 2019 Men's Youth World Handball Championship in North Macedonia
  - Egypt defeated Germany, 32–28, to win their first Men's Youth World Handball Championship title.
  - Denmark took third place.
- August 26 – September 1: 2019 IHF Super Globe in Saudi Arabia
  - (Spain) FC Barcelona defeated (Germany) THW Kiel, 34–32, to win their fifth IHF Super Globe title.
  - (North Macedonia) RK Vardar took third place.
- November 30 – December 15: 2019 World Women's Handball Championship in (Japan) Kumamoto

=== EHF ===
- September 12, 2018 – June 2: 2018–19 EHF Champions League
  - In the final, (North Macedonia) RK Vardar defeated (Hungary) Telekom Veszprém, 27–24, to win their 2nd EHF Champions League.
  - (Spain) Barcellona Lassa took third place and (Poland) PGE Vive Kielce took fourth place.
  - RK Vardar has qualified to compete at the 2019 IHF Super Globe.
- September 1, 2018 – May 19: 2018–19 EHF Cup
  - In the final, (Germany) THW Kiel defeated (Germany) Füchse Berlin, 26–22, to win their 4th EHF Cup.
  - (Portugal) FC Porto took third place and (Denmark) TTH Holstebro took fourth place.
- September 7, 2018 – May 12: 2018–19 Women's EHF Champions League
  - In the final, (Hungary) Győri Audi KC defeated (Russia) Rostov-Don, 25–24, to win their 5th Women's EHF Champions league.
  - (Norway) Vipers Kristiansand took third place and (France) Metz Handball took fourth place.
- September 8, 2018 – May 12: 2018–19 Women's EHF Cup
  - In the final, (Hungary) Siófok KC defeated (Denmark) Team Esbjerg, 47–42 in aggregate, to win their 1st Women's EHF Cup.
  - (Denmark) Viborg HK took third place and (Denmark) Herning-Ikast Håndbold took fourth place.
- October 6, 2018 – May 18: 2018–19 EHF Challenge Cup
  - In the final, (Romania) CSM București defeated (Portugal) Madeira Andebol SAD, 48–42 in aggregate, to win their 1st EHF Challenge Cup.
- November 9, 2018 – May 12: 2018–19 CEV Women's Challenge Cup
  - In the final, (Spain) BM Remudas defeated (Poland) Pogoń Baltica Szczecin, 53–47 in aggregate, to win their 2nd CEV Women's Challenge Cup.

Other competitions

- August 28, 2018 – April 3: 2018–19 SEHA League
  - In the final, (North Macedonia) RK Vardar defeated (Croatia) RK Zagreb, 26–23, to win their 5th SEHA League.
  - (Belarus) HC Meshkov Brest took third place and (Croatia) RK Nexe Našice took fourth place.
- September 1, 2018 – May 19: 2018–19 MOL Liga Women
  - In the finals, (Slovakia) IUVENTA Michalovce and (Czech Republic) DHK Baník Most defeated (Slovakia) ŠŠK SLŠ Prešov and (Czech Republic) DHC Slavia Praha.
  - (Slovakia) HKM Sala and (Czech Republic) DHC Sokol Poruba took third places and (Slovakia) HK Sokol RMK Bánovce nad Bebravou and (Czech Republic) HC Britterm Veselí took fourth places.
- September 15, 2018 – March 31: 2018–19 BeNe League
  - In the final, (Belgium) HC Achilles Bocholt defeated (Belgium) HC Visé BM, 30–27.
  - (Netherlands) Limburg Lions took third place and (Netherlands) HV Aalsmeer took fourth place.
- September 16, 2018 – April 21: 2018–19 Baltic Handball League (final four in (Belarus) Minsk)
  - In the final, (Finland) Riihimäki Cocks defeated (Ukraine) ZTR Zaporizhia, 23–22, to win their 4th consecutive title.
  - (Belarus) SKA Minsk took third place and (Lithuania) Dragūnas Klaipėda took fourth place.

Teams events

- July 11 – 21: 2019 Women's U-19 European Handball Championship in Győr
  - In the final, Hungary defeated Netherlands, 27–20, to win their 1st title.
  - Norway took third place and Russia took fourth place.
- July 13 – 21: 2019 Women's U-19 EHF Handball Championship (Division II) – Group 2 Varna (debut event)
  - In the final, Serbia defeated Poland, 22–20, to win their 1st title.
  - Ukraine took third place and Bulgaria took fourth place.
- July 15 – 21: 2019 Women's U-19 EHF Handball Championship (Division II) – Group 1 in Kaunas/Klaipėda (debut event)
  - In the final, Switzerland defeated Czech Republic, 30–24, to win their 1st title.
  - Turkey took third place and Lithuania took fourth place.
- August 1 – 11: 2019 European Women's U-17 Handball Championship in (Slovenia) Celje
  - In the final Hungary defeated Sweden, 28–24, to win their 1st title.
  - France took third place and Denmark took fourth place.
- August 3 – 11: 2019 European Women's U-17 Handball Championship (Division II) – Group 1 in (Georgia (country)) Tbilisi (debut event)
- August 3 – 11: 2019 European Women's U-17 Handball Championship (Division II) – Group 2 in (Italy) Lignano Sabbiadoro (debut event)

=== CAHB ===
- February 25 – March 1: IHF Trophy Africa – Zone 3 (women's youth & junior) in Niamey
  - Youth: 1st place: Nigeria, 2nd place: Niger, 3rd place: Benin, 4th place: Togo
  - Junior: 1st place: Benin, 2nd place: Nigeria, 3rd place: Niger, 4th place: Togo
- March 10 – 16: IHF Trophy Africa – Zone 5 in Zanzibar
  - Youth: 1st place: Uganda, 2nd place: Ethiopia, 3rd place: Rwanda, 4th place: Kenya, 5th. Tanzania, 6th. Burundi, 7th. Djibouti, 8th. Sudan
  - Junior: 1st place: Uganda, 2nd place: Kenya, 3rd place: Rwanda, 4th place: Burundi, 5th. Ethiopia, 6th. Djibouti, 7th. Tanzania, 8th. Sudan
- March 31 – April 4: IHF Trophy Africa – Zone 2 in Nouakchott
  - Youth: 1st place: Guinea, 2nd place: Cape Verde, 3rd place: Senegal, 4th place: Mali, 5th. Mauritania, 6th. Gambia
  - Junior: 1st place: Senegal, 2nd place: Guinea, 3rd place: Cape Verde, 4th place: Mauritania, 5th. Mali, 6th. Gambia
- April 3: 2019 African Handball Super Cup in (Morocco) Oudja
  - Men: (Egypt) Zamalek SC defeated (Egypt) Al Ahly, 38–35, to win their 5th title.
  - Women: (Angola) 1º de Agosto defeated (Angola) Petro de Luanda, 19–13, to win their 4th title.
  - Zamalek SC has qualified to compete at the 2019 IHF Super Globe.
- April 5 – 14: 2019 African Handball Cup Winners' Cup in (Morocco) Oudja
  - In the final, (Tunisia) ES Sahel defeated (Egypt) Al Ahly, 28–24, to win their 2nd title. (Tunisia) Espérance ST took third place and (Morocco) Mouloudia Oujda took fourth place.
- April 5 – 14: 2019 African Women's Handball Cup Winners' Cup in (Morocco) Oudja
  - In the final, (Angola) 1º de Agosto defeated (Angola) Petro de Luanda, 28–16, to win their 4th title. (Republic of the Congo) DGSP took third place and (Cameroon) FAP Yaoundé took fourth place.
- May 22 – 26: IHF Women's Trophy Africa – Zone IV in (Democratic Republic of the Congo) Kinshasa
  - Youth: 1st place: Cameroon, 2nd place: DR Congo, 3rd place: Morocco, 4th place: Central African Republic
  - Junior: 1st place: Cameroon, 2nd place: DR Congo, 3rd place: Morocco, 4th place: Central African Republic
- September 6 – 15: 2019 African Women's Junior Handball Championship in Niger
  - In the final, Tunisia defeated Angola, 26–25. Guinea took third place and DR Congo took fourth place.
- September 18 – 26: 2019 African Women's Youth Handball Championship in Niger
  - Round Robin: 1st place: Egypt, 2nd place: Angola, 3rd place: Tunisia, 4th place: Guinea
- October 17 – 26: 2019 African Handball Champions League in Cape Verde

=== AHF ===
- March 20 – April 2: 2018 Asian Men's Club League Handball Championship in Kuwait
  - In the final, (Qatar) Al-Duhail SC defeated (Qatar) Al-Wakrah SC, 22–21, to win their 2nd Asian Men's Club League Handball Championship.
  - (United Arab Emirates) Al Sharjah took third place.
  - Note: Al-Duhail SC has qualified to compete at the 2019 IHF Super Globe.
- May 1 – 5: IHF Trophy Asia – Zone 1B in Jakarta
  - Youth: In the final, Thailand defeated Indonesia, 32–12.
  - Singapore took third place and Brunei took fourth place.
  - Junior: In the final, Thailand defeated Indonesia, 46–12.
  - Philippines took third place and Singapore took fourth place.
- May 6 – 10: IHF Trophy Asia – Zone 3 in Ulaanbaatar
  - Youth: 1st place: Uzbekistan, 2nd place: Turkmenistan, 3rd place: Mongolia, 4th place: Kyrgyzstan, 5th. Tajikistan
  - Junior: 1st place: Uzbekistan, 2nd place: Turkmenistan, 3rd place: Mongolia, 4th place: Tajikistan, 5th. Kyrgyzstan
- May 26 – 30: IHF Trophy Asia – Zone 1A in Taichung
  - Youth: 1st place: South Korea, 2nd place: Chinese Taipei, 3rd place: Vietnam, 4th place: Hong Kong
  - Junior: 1st place: South Korea, 2nd place: Chinese Taipei, 3rd place: Vietnam, 4th place: Hong Kong, 5th. Macau
- June 15 – 22: 2019 Asian Beach Handball Championship for Men and Women in Weihai
  - Men: Champions: Qatar; Second: Oman; Third: Iran; Fourth: Vietnam;
  - Women: Champions: China; Second: Vietnam; Third: Chinese Taipei; Fourth: Thailand;
- June 16 – 23: 2019 Asian Women's Club League Handball Championship in (Kazakhstan) Astana
  - Champions: (Kazakhstan) Kaisar Club; Second: (North Korea) 4.25 Club; Third: (Kazakhstan) Almaty Club; Fourth: (Uzbekistan) AGMK Club;
  - Kaisar Club has qualified to compete at the 2019 IHF Women's Super Globe.
- July 20 – 29: 2019 Asian Women's U19 Handball Championship in (Lebanon) Beirut
- August 21 – 30: 2019 Asian Women's Youth Handball Championship in (India) Jaipur
  - In the final, South Korea defeated China, 32–14, to win their 8th Asian Women's Youth Handball Championship title.
  - Japan took third place.
- November 9 – 21: 2019 Asian Men's Club League Handball Championship in South Korea

=== North America and Caribbean ===
National teams

- April 8 – 14: 2019 IHF North American and Caribbean Emerging Nations Championship in Santo Domingo
  - In the final, Cuba defeated United States, 37–36, to win their 1st IHF North American and Caribbean Emerging Nations Championship. Dominican Republic took third place and Puerto Rico took fourth place.

Clubs

- May 9 – 12: 2019 IHF North American and Caribbean Super Globe Qualifier in (United States) Lake Placid
  - (United States) NYC Team Handball won the round robin tournament with (Canada) Handball Québec in second and (United States) Los Angeles Team Handball Club in third.
  - Note: NYC Team Handball has qualified to compete at the 2019 IHF Super Globe.

=== South and Central America ===
National teams

- April 3 – 7: 2019 South and Central American Men's Junior Handball Championship in (Colombia) Palmira
  - Argentina won the round robin tournament with Brazil in second and Chile in third.
  - Note: All teams mentioned above have qualified to compete at the 2019 Men's Junior World Handball Championship.
- May 7 – 13: 2019 South and Central American Men's Youth Handball Championship in Taubaté
  - Brazil won the round robin tournament with Argentina in second and Chile in third.
  - Note: All teams mentioned above have qualified to compete at the 2019 Men's Youth World Handball Championship.
- July 11 – 14: 2019 South and Central American Beach Handball Championship in Maricá
  - Men: Brazil defeated Uruguay 2–0 to win the first ever South and Central American Beach Handball Championship.
    - Argentina took third place
  - Women: Brazil defeated Argentina 2–0 to win the first ever South and Central American Beach Handball Championship.
    - Paraguay took third place

Clubs

- March 12 – 16: 2019 South and Central American Women's Club Handball Championship in (Brazil) Concórdia
  - (Brazil) UnC Concórdia won the round robin tournament with (Brazil) UNIP São Bernardo in second and (Argentina) Ferro Carril Oeste in third.
  - Note: UnC Concórdia has qualified to compete at the 2019 IHF Women's Super Globe.
- May 22 – 26: 2019 South and Central American Men's Club Handball Championship in (Brazil) Taubaté
  - (Brazil) Handebol Taubaté defeated (Argentina) UNLu, 27–21, to win the first South and Central American Men's Club Handball Championship title.
  - (Brazil) EC Pinheiros took third place.
  - Note: Handebol Taubaté has qualified to compete at the 2019 IHF Super Globe.

=== OCHF ===
- February 21 – 24: 2019 Oceania Beach Handball Championships in Glenelg
  - Men's: Australia defeated New Zealand, 2–0. Cook Islands took third place and American Samoa took fourth place.
  - Women's: Australia defeated American Samoa, 2–1. New Zealand took third place and Cook Islands took fourth place.
- August 11 – 17: IHF Trophy Oceania in (New Caledonia) Païta

== Korfball ==
=== Europe ===
- January 10 – 12: 53rd IKF Europa Cup in (Belgium) Kortrijk
  - In the final, (Netherlands) TOP/SolarCompleet defeated (Belgium) Boeckenberg KC, 31–16. (England) Trojans KC took third place and (Germany) SG Pegasus took fourth place.
- January 25 – 27: IKF Europa Shield in (Czech Republic) Prostějov
  - In the final, (England) Bec Korfball Club defeated (Czech Republic) KCC Sokol České Budějovice, 16–9. (Czech Republic) SK RG Prostejov took third place and (Catalonia) CK Vallparadis/Assessoria took fourth place.
- July 5 – 9: U15 European Korfball Championship 2019 in Dunakeszi
  - Championship A: In the final, Netherlands 1 defeated Portugal, 9–4.
  - Czech Republic took third place.
  - Championship B: In the final, Netherlands 2 defeated England 2, 8–6.
  - Hungary 2 took third place.
- October 15 – 19: IKF U21 European Korfball Championship 2019 in (Czech Republic) Prostějov

=== Asia ===
- March 9 & 10: IKF Beach Korfball World Cup (Asia) 2019 in Hong Kong
  - Open group final ranking: 1st. Chinese Taipei, 2nd. China, 3rd. Hong Kong, 4th. Japan, 5th. Thailand
  - University Group final ranking: 1st. Chinese Taipei, 2nd. China, 3rd. Thailand, 4th. Hong Kong
- May 20 – 25: IKF U21 Asia Oceania Korfball Championship 2019 in Shaoxing
  - In the final, Chinese Taipei defeated China, 23–5.
  - Hong Kong took third place.

=== World ===
- April 19 – 21: IKF U19 World Korfball Championship 2019 in Leeuwarden
  - In the final, Netherlands defeated Belgium, 19–18.
  - Chinese Taipei took third place.
- June 28 – 30: U17 Korfball World Cup 2019 in Eindhoven
  - In the final, Netherlands defeated Belgium, 23–13.
  - Chinese Taipei took third place.
- July 6 & 7: IKF Beach Korfball World Cup in (France) Bonson
  - U19: In the final, Belgium 1 defeated Netherlands 2, 6–4.
  - Netherlands 1 took third place.
  - Seniors: In the final, Portugal defeated Netherlands, 9–8 at free shots after a 7–7 draw (a.e.t.).
  - Belgium took third place.
- August 1 – 10: 2019 IKF World Korfball Championship in (South Africa) Durban

== Lacrosse ==
=== International Lacrosse events ===
- June 29 – July 6: 2019 Men's U20 European Lacrosse Championship in Prague (debut event)
  - England defeated Germany, 9–8, to win the inaugural Men's U20 European Lacrosse Championship title.
  - The Czech Republic took third place.
- July 16 – 25: 2019 Women's European Lacrosse Championship in Netanya
  - England defeated Israel, 10–7, to win their third consecutive and seventh overall Women's European Lacrosse Championship title.
  - Wales took third place.
- August 1 – 10: 2019 FIL Women's Under-19 World Lacrosse Championships in Peterborough
  - The United States defeated Canada, 13–3, to win their fifth Women's Under-19 World Lacrosse Championships title.
  - Australia took third place.
- September 19 – 28: 2019 World Indoor Lacrosse Championship in Langley
  - Canada defeated Haudenosaunee, 19–12, to win their fifth consecutive World Indoor Lacrosse Championship title.
  - United States took third place.

=== National Lacrosse League ===
- December 15, 2018 – April 27, 2019: 2019 NLL season
  - Best regular season & East Division winners: (New York (state)) Buffalo Bandits
  - West Division winners: Saskatchewan Rush
  - May 3 – 25: 2019 NLL playoffs
    - (Alberta) Calgary Roughnecks defeated (New York (state)) Buffalo Bandits, 2–0 out of 3 games, to win their third NLL title.

=== Major League Lacrosse ===
- May 31 – October 6: 2019 Major League Lacrosse season
  - The (Maryland) Chesapeake Bayhawks defeated the (Colorado) Denver Outlaws, 10–9, to win their fourth Major League Lacrosse title.

== Motorsport ==
=== 2019 Formula One World Championship ===
- March 17: (Australia) 2019 Australian Grand Prix Winner: (Finland) Valtteri Bottas ( (Germany) Mercedes)
- March 31: 2019 Bahrain Grand Prix Winner: (United Kingdom) Lewis Hamilton ( (Germany) Mercedes)
- April 14: (China) 2019 Chinese Grand Prix Winner: (United Kingdom) Lewis Hamilton ( (Germany) Mercedes)
- April 28: 2019 Azerbaijan Grand Prix Winner: (Finland) Valtteri Bottas ( (Germany) Mercedes)
- May 12: (Spain) 2019 Spanish Grand Prix Winner: (United Kingdom) Lewis Hamilton ( (Germany) Mercedes)
- May 26: 2019 Monaco Grand Prix Winner: (United Kingdom) Lewis Hamilton ( (Germany) Mercedes)
- June 9: (Canada) 2019 Canadian Grand Prix Winner: (United Kingdom) Lewis Hamilton ( (Germany) Mercedes)
- June 23: (France) 2019 French Grand Prix Winner: (United Kingdom) Lewis Hamilton ( (Germany) Mercedes)
- June 30: (Austria) 2019 Austrian Grand Prix Winner: (Netherlands) Max Verstappen ( (Austria) Red Bull Racing-Honda)
- July 14: (United Kingdom) 2019 British Grand Prix Winner: (United Kingdom) Lewis Hamilton ( (Germany) Mercedes)
- July 28: (Germany) 2019 German Grand Prix Winner: (Netherlands) Max Verstappen ( (Austria) Red Bull Racing-Honda)
- August 4: (Hungary) 2019 Hungarian Grand Prix Winner: (United Kingdom) Lewis Hamilton ( (Germany) Mercedes)
- September 1: (Belgium) 2019 Belgian Grand Prix Winner: (Monaco) Charles Leclerc ( (Italy) Ferrari)
- September 8: (Italy) 2019 Italian Grand Prix Winner: (Monaco) Charles Leclerc ( (Italy) Ferrari)
- September 22: 2019 Singapore Grand Prix Winner: (Germany) Sebastian Vettel ( (Italy) Ferrari)
- September 29: (Russia) 2019 Russian Grand Prix Winner: (United Kingdom) Lewis Hamilton ( (Germany) Mercedes)
- October 13: (Japan) 2019 Japanese Grand Prix Winner: (Finland) Valtteri Bottas ( (Germany) Mercedes)
- October 27: (Mexico) 2019 Mexican Grand Prix Winner: (United Kingdom) Lewis Hamilton ( (Germany) Mercedes)
- November 3: 2019 United States Grand Prix (Finland) Valtteri Bottas ( (Germany) Mercedes)
- November 17: (Brazil) 2019 Brazilian Grand Prix (Netherlands) Max Verstappen ( (Austria) Red Bull Racing-Honda)
- December 1: (United Arab Emirates) 2019 Abu Dhabi Grand Prix (final) (United Kingdom) Lewis Hamilton ( (Germany) Mercedes)

=== 2018–19 Formula E season ===
- December 15, 2018: (Saudi Arabia) 2018 Ad Diriyah ePrix Winner: (Portugal) António Félix da Costa ( (United Kingdom) BMW i Andretti Motorsport)
- January 12: (Morocco) 2019 Marrakesh ePrix Winner: (Belgium) Jérôme d'Ambrosio ( (India) Mahindra Racing)
- January 27: (Chile) 2019 Santiago ePrix Winner: (United Kingdom) Sam Bird ( (United Kingdom) Envision Virgin Racing)
- February 17: 2019 Mexico City ePrix Winner: (Brazil) Lucas di Grassi ( (Germany) Audi Sport Abt Schaeffler Formula E Team)
- March 10: 2019 Hong Kong ePrix Winner: (Switzerland) Edoardo Mortara ( (Monaco) Venturi Formula E Team)
- March 23: (China) 2019 Sanya ePrix Winner: (France) Jean-Éric Vergne ( (China) DS Techeetah)
- April 13: (Italy) 2019 Rome ePrix Winner: (New Zealand) Mitch Evans ( (United Kingdom) Panasonic Jaguar Racing)
- April 27: (France) 2019 Paris ePrix Winner: (Netherlands) Robin Frijns ( (United Kingdom) Envision Virgin Racing)
- May 11: 2019 Monaco ePrix Winner: (France) Jean-Éric Vergne ( (China) DS Techeetah)
- May 25: (Germany) 2019 Berlin ePrix Winner: (Brazil) Lucas di Grassi ( (Germany) Audi Sport Abt Schaeffler Formula E Team)
- June 22: (Switzerland) 2019 Swiss ePrix Winner: (France) Jean-Éric Vergne ( (China) DS Techeetah)
- July 13 & 14: (United States) 2019 New York City ePrix (final)
  - Winners: Race 1: (Switzerland) Sebastien Buemi ( (France) Nissan e.dams) / Race 2: (Netherlands) Robin Frijns ( (United Kingdom) Envision Virgin Racing)

=== 2019 MotoGP season ===
- March 10: 2019 Qatar motorcycle Grand Prix
  - MotoGP winner: (Italy) Andrea Dovizioso
  - Moto2 winner: (Italy) Lorenzo Baldassarri
  - Moto3 winner: (Japan) Kaito Toba
- March 31: (Argentina) 2019 Argentine motorcycle Grand Prix
  - MotoGP winner: (Spain) Marc Márquez
  - Moto2 winner: (Italy) Lorenzo Baldassarri
  - Moto3 winner: (Spain) Jaume Masiá
- April 14: (United States) 2019 Motorcycle Grand Prix of the Americas
  - MotoGP winner: (Spain) Álex Rins
  - Moto2 winner: (Switzerland) Thomas Lüthi
  - Moto3 winner: (Spain) Arón Canet
- May 5: (Spain) 2019 Spanish motorcycle Grand Prix
  - MotoGP winner: (Spain) Marc Márquez
  - Moto2 winner: (Italy) Lorenzo Baldassarri
  - Moto3 winner: (Italy) Niccolò Antonelli
- May 19: (France) 2019 French motorcycle Grand Prix
  - MotoGP winner: (Spain) Marc Márquez
  - Moto2 winner: (Spain) Álex Márquez
  - Moto3 winner: (United Kingdom) John McPhee
- June 2: (Italy) 2019 Italian motorcycle Grand Prix
  - MotoGP winner: (Italy) Danilo Petrucci
  - Moto2 winner: (Spain) Álex Márquez
  - Moto3 winner: (Italy) Tony Arbolino
- June 16: (Catalonia) 2019 Catalan motorcycle Grand Prix
  - MotoGP winner: (Spain) Marc Márquez
  - Moto2 winner: (Spain) Álex Márquez
  - Moto3 winner: (Spain) Marcos Ramírez
- June 30: (Netherlands) 2019 Dutch TT
  - MotoGP winner: (Spain) Maverick Viñales
  - Moto2 winner: (Spain) Augusto Fernández
  - Moto3 winner: (Italy) Tony Arbolino
- July 7: (Germany) 2019 German motorcycle Grand Prix
  - MotoGP winner: (Spain) Marc Márquez
  - Moto2 winner: (Spain) Álex Márquez
  - Moto3 winner: (Italy) Lorenzo Dalla Porta
- August 4: 2019 Czech Republic motorcycle Grand Prix
  - MotoGP winner: (Spain) Marc Márquez
  - Moto2 winner: (Spain) Álex Márquez
  - Moto3 winner: (Spain) Arón Canet
- August 11: (Austria) 2019 Austrian motorcycle Grand Prix
  - MotoGP winner: (Italy) Andrea Dovizioso
  - Moto2 winner: (South Africa) Brad Binder
  - Moto3 winner: (Italy) Romano Fenati
- August 25: (United Kingdom) 2019 British motorcycle Grand Prix
  - MotoGP winner: (Spain) Álex Rins
  - Moto2 winner: (Spain) Augusto Fernández
  - Moto3 winner: (Spain) Marcos Ramírez
- September 15: 2019 San Marino and Rimini's Coast motorcycle Grand Prix
- September 22: 2019 Aragon motorcycle Grand Prix
- October 6: 2019 Thailand motorcycle Grand Prix
- October 20: (Japan) 2019 Japanese motorcycle Grand Prix
- October 27: (Australia) 2019 Australian motorcycle Grand Prix
- November 3: (Malaysia) 2019 Malaysian motorcycle Grand Prix
- November 17: 2019 Valencian Community motorcycle Grand Prix (final)

=== 2019 Superbike World Championship ===
- February 23 & 24: #1 in (Australia) Phillip Island Grand Prix Circuit
  - Race 1, Superpole Race, Race 2 Winner: (Spain) Álvaro Bautista ( (Italy) ARUBA.IT Racing – Ducati)
- March 16 & 17: #2 in (Thailand) Chang International Circuit
  - Race 1, Superpole Race, Race 2 Winner: (Spain) Álvaro Bautista ( (Italy) ARUBA.IT Racing – Ducati)
- April 6 & 7: #3 in (Spain) Motorland Aragón
  - Race 1, Superpole Race, Race 2 Winner: (Spain) Álvaro Bautista ( (Italy) ARUBA.IT Racing – Ducati)
- April 14: #4 in (Netherlands) TT Circuit Assen
  - Race 1, Race 2 Winner: (Spain) Álvaro Bautista ( (Italy) ARUBA.IT Racing – Ducati)
  - Superpole Race was cancelled due to the postponement of Race 1 from Saturday to Sunday (snowfall).
- May 11 & 12: #5 in (Italy) Autodromo Enzo e Dino Ferrari
  - Race 1, Superpole Race Winner: (United Kingdom) Jonathan Rea ( (Japan) Kawasaki Racing Team WorldSBK)
  - Race 2 was cancelled due to torrential rain.
- June 8 & 9: #6 in (Spain) Circuito de Jerez
  - Race 1, Superpole Race winner: (Spain) Álvaro Bautista ( (Italy) ARUBA.IT Racing – Ducati)
  - Race 2 winner: (Netherlands) Michael van der Mark ( (Japan) Pata Yamaha WorldSBK Team)
- June 22 & 23: #7 in (Italy) Misano World Circuit Marco Simoncelli
  - Race 1, Race 2 winner: (United Kingdom) Jonathan Rea ( (Japan) Kawasaki Racing Team WorldSBK
  - Superpole Race winner: (Spain) Álvaro Bautista ( (Italy) ARUBA.IT Racing – Ducati)
- July 6 & 7: #8 in (United Kingdom) Donington Park
  - Race 1, Superpole Race, Race 2 Winner: (United Kingdom) Jonathan Rea ( (Japan) Kawasaki Racing Team WorldSBK)
- July 13 & 14: #9 in (United States) WeatherTech Raceway Laguna Seca
  - Race 1, Superpole Race Winner: (United Kingdom) Jonathan Rea ( (Japan) Kawasaki Racing Team WorldSBK)
  - Race 2 Winner: (United Kingdom) Chaz Davies ( (Italy) ARUBA.IT Racing – Ducati)
- September 7 & 8: #10 in (Portugal) Algarve International Circuit
- September 28 & 29: #11 in (France) Circuit de Nevers Magny-Cours
- October 12 & 13: #12 in (Argentina) Circuito San Juan Villicum
- October 25 & 26: #13 in (Qatar) Losail International Circuit (final)

=== 2019 WTCR ===
- April 6 & 7: Race of Morocco
  - Race 1 winner: (Argentina) Esteban Guerrieri ( (Germany) ALL-INKL.COM Münnich Motorsport)
  - Race 2 winner: (Italy) Gabriele Tarquini ( (Italy) BRC Hyundai N Squadra Corse)
  - Race 3 winner: (Sweden) Thed Björk ( (Sweden) Cyan Racing Lynk & Co)
- April 27 & 28: Race of Hungary
  - Race 1 winner: (Argentina) Néstor Girolami ( (Germany) ALL-INKL.COM Münnich Motorsport)
  - Race 2 winner: (Argentina) Néstor Girolami ( (Germany) ALL-INKL.COM Münnich Motorsport)
  - Race 3 winner: (Italy) Gabriele Tarquini ( (Italy) BRC Hyundai N Squadra Corse)
- May 10 – 12: Race of Slovakia
  - Race 1 winner: (Belgium) Frédéric Vervisch ( (Belgium) Comtoyou Team Audi Sport)
  - Race 2 winner: (Argentina) Néstor Girolami ( (Germany) ALL-INKL.COM Münnich Motorsport)
  - Race 3 winner: (China) Ma Qing Hua ( (Italy) Mulsanne Srl)
- May 18 & 19: Race of the Netherlands
  - Race 1 winner: (Sweden) Thed Björk ( (Sweden) Cyan Racing Lynk & Co)
  - Race 2 winner: (Argentina) Esteban Guerrieri ( (Germany) ALL-INKL.COM Münnich Motorsport)
  - Race 3 winner: (Sweden) Thed Björk ( (Sweden) Cyan Racing Lynk & Co)
- June 21 & 22: Race of Germany
  - Race 1 winner: (Hungary) Norbert Michelisz ( (Italy) BRC Hyundai N Squadra Corse)
  - Race 2 winner: (Sweden) Johan Kristoffersson ( (France) SLR Volkswagen)
  - Race 3 winner: (Germany) Benjamin Leuchter ( (France) SLR Volkswagen)
- July 6 & 7: Race of Portugal
  - Race 1 winner: (Hungary) Norbert Michelisz ( (Italy) BRC Hyundai N Squadra Corse)
  - Race 2 winner: (Spain) Mikel Azcona ( (Sweden) PWR Racing)
  - Race 3 winner: (Portugal) Tiago Monteiro ( (Hong Kong) KCMG)
- September 14 & 15: Race of China
- October 26 & 27: Race of Japan
- November 16 & 17: Guia Race of Macau
- December 7 & 8: Race of Malaysia (final)

=== 2019 Blancpain GT Series ===
- April 14: (Italy) 3 Hours of Monza Winners:
  - Pro: (Italy) #54 Dinamic Motorsport
  - Silver: (France) #90 AKKA ASP Team
  - Pro-Am: (United Kingdom) #93 Tempesta Racing
  - Am: (United Kingdom) #77 Barwell Motorsport
- May 5: (United Kingdom) GT World Challenge Europe Brands Hatch
  - Pro: (Germany) #4 Black Falcon (both)
  - Silver: (France) #89 AKKA ASP Team (both)
  - Pro-Am: (Germany) #333 Rinaldi Racing (Race 1) / (China) #519 Orange1 FFF Racing Team (Race 2)
  - Am: (Austria) #444 HB Racing (both)
- May 12: (United Kingdom) 3 Hours of Silverstone
  - Pro: (Russia) #72 SMP Racing
  - Silver: (Austria) #19 GRT Grasser Racing Team
  - Pro-Am: (Italy) #52 AF Corse
  - Am: (United Kingdom) #77 Barwell Motorsport
- June 1: (France) 6 Hours of Castellet
  - Pro: (United Kingdom) #107 Bentley Team M-Sport
  - Silver: (France) #90 AKKA ASP Team
  - Pro-Am: (France) #87 AKKA ASP Team
  - Am: (United Kingdom) #188 Garage 59
- June 30: (Italy) GT World Challenge Europe Misano
  - Pro: (China) #563 Orange1 FFF Racing Team (Race 1) / (Belgium) #2 Belgian Audi Club Team WRT (Race 2)
  - Silver: (France) #89 AKKA ASP Team (Race 1) / (France) #90 AKKA ASP Team (Race 2)
  - Pro-Am: (Italy) #52 AF Corse (Race 1) / (China) #519 Orange1 FFF Racing Team (Race 2)
  - Am: (Austria) #444 HB Racing (both)
- July 14: (Netherlands) GT World Challenge Europe Zandvoort
  - Pro: (France) #88 AKKA ASP Team (Race 1) / (France) #25 Saintéloc Racing (Race 2)
  - Silver: (Switzerland) #62 R-Motorsport (both)
  - Pro-Am: (China) #519 Orange1 FFF Racing Team (Race 1) / (Germany) #333 Rinaldi Racing (Race 2)
  - Am: (Austria) #444 HB Racing (both)
- July 27 & 28: (Belgium) 2019 Total 24 hours of Spa
- September 1: (Germany) GT World Challenge Europe Nürburgring
- September 8: (Hungary) GT World Challenge Europe Mogyoród
- September 29: (Spain) 3 Hours of Barcelona (final)

=== 2019 Deutsche Tourenwagen Masters ===
- May 4 & 5: (Germany) Hockenheimring #1
  - Race 1 winner: (Germany) Marco Wittmann
  - Race 2 winner: (Germany) René Rast
- May 18 & 19: (Belgium) Heusden-Zolder
  - Race 1 winner: (Austria) Philipp Eng
  - Race 2 winner: (Germany) René Rast
- June 8 & 9: (Italy) Misano
  - Race 1 winner: (Germany) Marco Wittmann
  - Race 2 winner: (Switzerland) Nico Müller
- July 6 & 7: (Germany) Norisring
  - Race 1 winner: (Germany) René Rast
  - Race 2 winner: (Canada) Bruno Spengler
- July 20 & 21: (Netherlands) Assen
  - Race 1 winner: (Germany) Marco Wittmann
  - Race 2 winner: (Germany) Mike Rockenfeller
- August 10 & 11: (United Kingdom) Brands Hatch
  - Race 1 winner: (Germany) Marco Wittmann
  - Race 2 winner: (Germany) René Rast
- August 24 & 25: (Germany) Lausitzring
  - Race 1 winner: (Switzerland) Nico Müller
  - Race 2 winner: (Germany) René Rast
- September 14 & 15: (Germany) Nürburgring
  - Race 1 winner: (Germany) René Rast
  - Race 2 winner: (United Kingdom) Jamie Green
- October 5 & 6: (Germany) Hockenheimring #2 (final)
  - Race 1 winner: (Germany) René Rast
  - Race 2 winner: (Switzerland) Nico Müller

=== 2019–2020 World Endurance Championship ===
- September 1: (United Kingdom) 4 Hours of Silverstone
- October 6: (Japan) 6 Hours of Fuji
- November 10: (China) 4 hours of Shanghai
- December 14: 8 Hours of Bahrain
- February 1, 2020: (Brazil) 6 Hours of São Paulo
- March 2020: (United States) 1000 km of Sebring
- May 2, 2020: (Belgium) 6 Hours of Spa-Francorchamps
- June 13 & 14, 2020: (France) 2020 24 Hours of Le Mans (final)

=== 2018–2019 Endurance World Championship ===
- September 15 & 16, 2018: 2018 Bol d'Or Winners: (Japan) #1 F.C.C TSR Honda France
- April 20 & 21: 2019 24 Hours of Le Mans Winners: (Japan) #11 Team SRC Kawasaki France
- May 11: 2019 8 Hours of Slovakia Ring Winners: (Austria) #7 YART Yamaha
- June 8: (Germany) 2019 8 Hours of Oschersleben Winners: (Japan) #1 F.C.C TSR Honda France
- July 28: (Japan) 2019 Suzuka 8 Hours (final)

=== 2019 World Rally Championship ===
- January 24 – 27: (Monaco) 2019 Monte Carlo Rally Winner: (France) Sébastien Ogier ( (France) Citroën World Rally Team)
- February 14 – 17: 2019 Rally Sweden Winner: (Estonia) Ott Tänak ( (Japan) Toyota Gazoo Racing WRT)
- March 7 – 10: 2019 Rally Mexico Winner: (France) Sébastien Ogier ( (France) Citroën World Rally Team)
- March 28 – 31: (France) 2019 Tour de Corse Winner: (Belgium) Thierry Neuville ( (South Korea) Hyundai Shell Mobis WRT)
- April 25 – 28: 2019 Rally Argentina Winner: (Belgium) Thierry Neuville ( (South Korea) Hyundai Shell Mobis WRT)
- May 9 – 12: 2019 Rally Chile Winner: (Estonia) Ott Tänak ( (Japan) Toyota Gazoo Racing WRT)
- May 30 – June 2: 2019 Rally de Portugal Winner: (Estonia) Ott Tänak ( (Japan) Toyota Gazoo Racing WRT)
- June 13 – 16: (Italy) 2019 Rally Italia Sardegna Winner: (Spain) Daniel Sordo ( (South Korea) Hyundai Shell Mobis WRT)
- August 1 – 4: 2019 Rally Finland Winner: (Estonia) Ott Tänak ( (Japan) Toyota Gazoo Racing WRT)
- August 22 – 25: (Germany) 2019 Rallye Deutschland Winner: (Estonia) Ott Tänak ( (Japan) Toyota Gazoo Racing WRT)
- September 12 – 15: 2019 Rally of Turkey Winner: (France) Sébastien Ogier ( (France) Citroën World Rally Team)
- October 3 – 6: (United Kingdom) 2019 Wales Rally GB Winner: (Estonia) Ott Tänak ( (Japan) Toyota Gazoo Racing WRT)
- October 24 – 27: (Spain) 2019 Rally de España
- November 14 – 17: 2019 Rally Australia (final)

=== 2019 Dakar Rally ===
- January 6 – 17: 2019 Dakar Rally in Peru
  - Bikes winner: (Australia) Toby Price (Red Bull KTM Factory Racing)
  - Cars winner: (Qatar) Nasser Al-Attiyah (Toyota Gazoo Racing SA)
  - Quads winner: (Argentina) Nicolás Cavigliasso (Dragon Racing)
  - SxS winner: (Chile) Francisco López Contardo (South Racing Can-Am)
  - Trucks winner: (Russia) Eduard Nikolaev (Kamaz-Master)

=== 2019 FIA World Cup for Cross-Country Rallies ===
- February 21–26: 2019 Qatar Cross Country Rally
  - T1 winner: (Qatar) Nasser Al-Attiyah (Toyota Gazoo Racing SA)
  - T2 winner: (Qatar) Mohammed Al-Meer (QMMF Team)
  - T3 winner: (Brazil) Reinaldo Varela (Monster Energy Can-Am)
  - T4 winner: (Saudi Arabia) Ibrahim Al-Muhana (Al-Muhana)
- March 30 - April 4: 2019 (United Arab Emirates) Abu Dhabi Desert Challenge
  - T1 winner: (France) Stephane Peterhansel (X-Raid Mini)
  - T2 winner: (Qatar) Mohammed Al-Meer (QMMF Team)
  - T3 winner: (United States) Casey Currie (Monster Energy Can-Am)
  - T4 winner:
- May 26 - June 1: 2019 Rally Kazakhstan
  - T1 winner: (Qatar) Nasser Al-Attiyah (Toyota Gazoo Racing SA)
  - T2 winner: (Qatar) Mohammed Al-Meer (QMMF Team)
  - T3 winner: (Brazil) Reinaldo Varela (Monster Energy Can-Am)
  - T4 winner: (Russia) Dimitry Sotnikov (Kamaz Master Team)
- October 3–9: 2019 (Morocco) Rallye du Maroc
  - T1 winner: (South Africa) Giniel de Villiers (Toyota Gazoo Racing SA)
  - T2 winner: (Poland) Tomasz Baranowski (Tomasz Baranowski)
  - T3 winner: (Brazil) Reinaldo Varela (Monster Energy Can-Am)
  - T4 winner: (Czech Republic) Jaroslav Valtr Sr (Valtr Racing Team)

=== 2019 FIM Cross-Country Rallies World Championship ===
- March 30 - April 4: 2019 (United Arab Emirates) Abu Dhabi Desert Challenge
  - Bikes winner: (United Kingdom) Sam Sunderland (Red Bull KTM Factory Racing)
  - Quads winner: (United Arab Emirates) Fahad Al Musallam (Fahad Al Musallam)
- July 6–16: 2019 (Russia) Silk Way Rally
  - Bikes winner: (United Kingdom) Sam Sunderland (Red Bull KTM Factory Racing)
  - Quads winner: (Poland) Rafał Sonik (Sonik Team)
- September 1–7: 2019 (Chile) Atacama Rally
  - Bikes winner: (Chile) Pablo Quintanilla (Rockstar Energy Husqvarna Factory Racing)
  - Quads winner: (Poland) Rafał Sonik (Sonik Team)
- October 3–9: 2019 (Morocco) Rallye du Maroc
  - Bikes winner: (United States) Andrew Short (Rockstar Energy Husqvarna Factory Racing)
  - Quads winner: (Chile) Ignacio Casale (Ignacio Casale)

=== 2019 FIA World Cup for Cross-Country Bajas ===
- February 14–17: 2019 Baja Russia - Northern Forest
  - T1 winner: (Finland) Tapio Lauronen (RE Autoklubs)
  - T2 winner: (Latvia) Aldia Vilcans (VA Motorsports)
  - T3 winner: (Italy) Michele Cinotto (CR Racing)
- March 7–9: 2019 (United Arab Emirates) Dubai International Baja
  - T1 winner: (Poland) Jakub Przygonski (Orlen Team/X-Raid)
  - T2 winner: (Russia) Alexander Baranenko (VA Motorsports)
  - T3 winner: (Qatar) Adel Abdulla (QMMF Team)
- June 20–23: 2019 (Italy) Italian Baja
  - T1 winner: (Argentina) Orlando Terranova (X-Raid)
  - T2 winner:
  - T3 winner: (Russia) Fedor Vorobyev (Zavidovo Racing Team)
- July 25–28: 2019 (Spain) Baja Aragón
  - T1 winner: (Argentina) Orlando Terranova (X-Raid)
  - T2 winner: (Portugal) Joao Ferreira (Joao Ferreira)
  - T3 winner: (Spain) Santi Navarro (FN Speed Team)
- August 8–11: 2019 (Hungary) Hungarian Baja
  - T1 winner: (Argentina) Orlando Terranova (X-Raid)
  - T2 winner: (Romania) Claudiu Barbu (Transcarpatic Rally Team)
  - T3 winner: (Russia) Fedor Vorobyev (Zavidovo Racing Team)
- August 29 - September 1: 2019 Baja Poland
  - T1 winner: (Poland) Krzysztof Holowczyc (X-Raid)
  - T2 winner: (Romania) Aldis Vilcans (VA Motorsports)
  - T3 winner: (Russia) Fedor Vorobyev (Zavidovo Racing Team)
- September 19–21: 2019 Jordan Baja
  - T1 winner: (Poland) Jakub Przygonski (Orlen Team/X-Raid)
  - T2 winner:
  - T3 winner: (Russia) Fedor Vorobyev (Zavidovo Racing Team)
- October 24–26: 2019 (Portugal) Baja de Partalegre 500
  - T1 winner: (Argentina) Orlando Terranova (X-Raid)
  - T2 winner: (Portugal) Joao Ferreira (Joao Ferreira)
  - T3 winner: (Russia) Fedor Vorobyev (Zavidovo Racing Team)

=== 2019 FIM Bajas World Cup ===
- March 7–9: 2019 (United Arab Emirates) Dubai International Baja
  - Bikes winner: (South Africa) Aaron Mare (Aaron Mare)
  - Quads winner: (United Arab Emirates) Khalifa Al Raisse (Khalifa Al Raisse)
- March 23–24: 2019 (Portugal) Baja do Pinhal
  - Bikes winner: (France) Benjamin Melot (Benjamin Melot)
  - Quads winner: (Portugal) Luís Engeitado (Luís Engeitado)
- July 26–28: 2019 (Spain) Baja Aragón
  - Bikes winner: (France) Michael Metge (Michael Metge)
  - Quads winner: (Spain) Daniel Vila Vaques (Daniel Vila Vaques)
- August 9–11: 2019 (Hungary) Hungarian Baja
  - Bikes winner: (Poland) Adam Tomiczek (Adam Tomiczek)
  - Quads winner: (Slovakia) Juraj Varga (Juraj Varga)

== Multi-sport events ==
- February 10 – 15: 2019 European Youth Olympic Winter Festival in (Bosnia and Herzegovina) Sarajevo and Istočno Sarajevo
  - Norway won the gold medal tally. Norway and Switzerland won 12 overall medals each.
- March 2 – 12: 2019 Winter Universiade in Krasnoyarsk
  - Russia won both the gold and overall medal tallies.
- March 14 – 21: 2019 Special Olympics World Summer Games in (United Arab Emirates) Abu Dhabi
  - For detailed results, click here and double-click a red dot or the sport of choice.
- March 14 – 23: 2019 South American Beach Games in Rosario
  - Argentina won both the gold and overall medal tallies.
- May 27 – June 1: 2019 Games of the Small States of Europe in (Montenegro) Budva
  - Luxembourg won both the gold and overall medal tallies.
- June 14 – 23: 2019 African Beach Games in (Cape Verde) Sal (debut event)
  - Morocco won the gold medal tally. Morocco and Algeria won 16 overall medals each.
- June 21 – 30: 2019 European Games in (Belarus) Minsk
  - Russia won both the gold and overall medal tallies.
- July 3 – 14: 2019 Summer Universiade in (Italy) Naples
  - Japan won the gold medal tally. Japan and Russia won 82 overall medals each.
- July 6 – 12: 2019 Island Games in Gibraltar
  - Jersey won both the gold and overall medal tallies.
- July 8 – 20: 2019 Pacific Games in (Samoa) Apia
  - New Caledonia won both the gold and overall medal tallies.
- July 19 – 28: 2019 Indian Ocean Island Games in Port Louis
  - Mauritius won both the gold and overall medal tallies.
- July 21 – 27: 2019 European Youth Summer Olympic Festival in (Azerbaijan) Baku
  - Russia won both the gold and overall medal tallies.
- July 26 – August 11: 2019 Pan American Games in (Peru) Lima
  - The United States won both the gold and overall medal tallies.
- August 8 – 18: 2019 World Police and Fire Games in (China) Chengdu
  - For results, click here.
- August 11 – 24: 12th East Africa Military Games in Nairobi
  - Basketball: Rwanda
  - Netball: Uganda
  - Volleyball: Uganda
  - Cross Country: Kenya (m) / Kenya (f)
- August 16 – 31: 2019 African Games in (Morocco) Rabat
  - Egypt won both the gold and overall medal tallies.
- September 13 – 15: 2019 World Urban Games in (Hungary) Budapest (debut event)
  - The United States and Russia won 3 gold medals each. The United States won the overall medal tally.
- October 12 – 16: 2019 World Beach Games in (Qatar) Doha
  - Spain won the gold medal tally. Brazil won the overall medal tally.
- October 18 – 27: 2019 Military World Games in Wuhan
  - China won both the gold and overall medal tallies.
- November 22 – 30: 2019 Bolivarian Beach Games in (Venezuela) Vargas
- November 30 – December 11: 2019 Southeast Asian Games in (Philippines) Clark, Subic, and Metro Manila
- December 1 – 13: 2019 South Asian Games in (Nepal) Kathmandu and Pokhara

== Netball ==
International tournaments

Date	Tournament	Winners	Runners up
13–20 January	2019 Netball Quad Series	Australia	England
15–21 June	2019 ECCB International Netball Series	Grenada	Saint Vincent and the Grenadines
15–20 July	2019 Pacific Games	Cook Islands	Tonga
12–21 July	2019 Netball World Cup	New Zealand	Australia
27–29 September	2019 Netball Europe Open Championships	England	Wales
20–26 October	2019 M1 Nations Cup	Namibia	Singapore
13–27 October	2019 Constellation Cup	Australia	New Zealand
18–23 October	2019 Africa Netball Cup	South Africa	Malawi
25 Nov–2 Dec	2019 SEA Games	Malaysia	Singapore
29 Nov–1 Dec	2019 South Africa England netball series	England	South Africa

Major national leagues, club tournaments

Host	League/Competition	Winners	Runners up
Australia	Suncorp Super Netball	New South Wales Swifts	Sunshine Coast Lightning
New Zealand	ANZ Premiership	Central Pulse	Northern Stars
New Zealand	Super Club	Collingwood Magpies	Northern Mystics
United Kingdom	Netball Superleague	Manchester Thunder	Wasps Netball

== Orienteering ==
=== 2019 World Cup Series ===
- June 7 – 11: World Cup #1 in (Finland) Helsinki
  - Middle winners: (Sweden) Gustav Bergman (m) / (Sweden) Tove Alexandersson
  - Pursuit winners: (Sweden) Gustav Bergman (m) / (Sweden) Tove Alexandersson
  - Sprint relay winners: Sweden 1 (Tove Alexandersson, Emil Svensk, Gustav Bergman, Karolin Ohlsson)
- August 14 – 16: World Cup #2 in (Norway) Østfold (part of 2019 World Orienteering Championships)
- September 26 – 29: World Cup #3 in (Switzerland) Basel
- October 25 – 29: World Cup #4 (final) in (China) Guangzhou

World and Continental Foot orienteering events

- April 29 – May 5: 2019 ISF World School Championships in Orienteering in Estonia
  - Long M1 School winners: (Sweden) Axel Elmblad (m) / (Finland) Melina Lahdenperä (f)
  - Middles M1 School winners: (Sweden) Axel Elmblad (m) / (Finland) Melina Lahdenperä (f)
  - Long M1 Selected winners: (Slovakia) Adam Jonáš (m) / (Sweden) Hanna Lundberg (f)
  - Middles M1 School winners: (Latvia) Davis Solmanis (m) / (Latvia) Elza Kuze (f)
  - Long M2 School winners: (England) Euan Tryner (m) / (New Zealand) Zara Stewart (f)
  - Middles M2 School winners: (England) Euan Tryner (m) / (New Zealand) Zara Stewart (f)
  - Long M2 Selected winners: (Spain) Aimar Urquizo (m) / (Belgium) Tille De Smul (f)
  - Middles M2 Selected winners: (Latvia) Emils Lazdans (m) / (Estonia) Brigitte Panker (f)
- June 27 – 30: European Youth Orienteering Championships in (Belarus) Grodno
  - Long winners: (Czech Republic) Martin Simsa (U16) & (Hungary) Ferenc Jonas (U18) (m) / (Czech Republic) Anna Karlova (U16) & (Hungary) Csilla Gárdonyi (U18) (f)
  - Sprint winners: (Germany) Konstantin Kunckel (U16) & (Poland) Stanislaw Kurzyp (U18) (m) / (Czech Republic) Marketa Mulickova (U16) & (Denmark) Malin Agervig Kristiansson (U18) (f)
  - Sprint Relay winners:
  - Czech Republic (Jakub Chaloupsky, Martin Simsa, Lukas Vitebsky) (U16) (m) / Finland 1 (Fanny Kukonlehto, Eeva Liina Ojanaho, Salla Isoherranen) (U16) (f)
  - Finland (Aaro Ojala, Topias Arola, Touko Seppa) (U18) (m) / Finland (Mikaela Karjalainen, Maria Maattanen, Melina Lahdenpera) (U18) (f)
- July 6 – 12: World Masters Orienteering Championships in (Latvia)
  - Long: For results, click here
  - Middle: For results, click here
  - Sprint: For results, click here
- July 6 – 12: Junior World Orienteering Championships in Denmark
  - Sprint winners: (Australia) Aston Key (m) / (Switzerland) Eline Gemperle (f)
  - Long winners: (Norway) Kasper Fosser (m) / (Russia) Veronika Kalinina (f)
  - Middle winners: (Norway) Kasper Fosser (m) / (Sweden) Isa Envall (f)
  - Relay winners: Norway 1 (m) / United Kingdom 1 (f)
- July 25 – 29: European University Orienteering Championships in Czech Republic
- August 12 – 17: 2019 World Orienteering Championships in (Norway) Østfold
- August 20 – 25: Asian Junior and Youth Orienteering Championships in Japan
- September 28 – October 6: Oceania Orienteering Championships in Australia
- November 2: Central American and Caribbean Orienteering Championships in Colombia

=== 2019 MTBO World Cup events ===
- June 8 – 10: World Cup #1 in (Poland) Wrocław (part of European MTBO Championships)
  - For results, see below.
- July 28 – August 3: World Cup #2 in Denmark (part of World MTB Orienteering Championships 2019)
- October 4 – 6: World Cup #3 (final) in Germany

World and Continental MTBO-orienteering events

- June 8 – 10: European MTBO Championships in (Poland) Wrocław
  - Mixed relay winners: Czech Republic 1
  - Sprint winners: (Estonia) Lauri Malsroos (m) / (Czech Republic) Veronika Kubínová (f)
  - Mass Start winners: (Russia) Anton Foliforov / (Denmark) Camilla Sogaard (f)
- July 28 – August 3: World MTB Orienteering Championships 2019 in Denmark
- July 28 – August 3: Junior World MTB Orienteering Championships in Denmark
- October 3 – 6: European Junior and Youth MTB Orienteering Championships in Germany
- October 3 – 6: World Masters MTB Orienteering Championships 2019 in Germany

=== 2019 SkiO World Cup events ===
- No World Cup events this year scheduled

World and Continental Ski-orienteering events

- February 4 – 11: European Ski Orienteering Championships in Turkey
  - Long winners: (Norway) Lars Moholdt (m) / (Sweden) Tove Alexandersson (f)
  - Middle winners: (Sweden) Erik Rost (m) / (Sweden) Magdalena Olsson (f)
  - Sprint winners: (Norway) Lars Moholdt (m) / (Russia) Alena Trapeznikova (f)
  - Sprint Relay winners: Russia 1 (Alena Trapeznikova & Sergey Gorlanov)
  - Relay winners: Norway 1 (Jørgen Baklid, Jørgen Madslien, Lars Moholdt) (m) / Russia 1 (Alena Trapeznikova, Tatyana Oborina, Maria Kechkina)
- March 5 – 10: 2019 Winter Universiade SkiO events in Krasnoyarsk
  - Sprint winners: (Russia) Vladislav Kiselev (m) / (Finland) Liisa Nenonen (f)
  - Pursuit winners: (Russia) Sergey Gorlanov (m) / (Russia) Marina Viatkina (f)
  - Middle winners: (Norway) Jørgen Baklid (m) / (Finland) Liisa Nenonen (f)
  - Sprint relay winners: Russia 1 (Sergey Gorlanov & Marina Viatkina)
- March 20 – 24: European Youth Ski Orienteering Championships in Sweden
  - Long U17 winners: (Russia) Ivan Kostin (b) / (Russia) Mariia Vorobeva (g)
  - Middle U17 winners: (Russia) Mikhail Beliakov (b) / (Russia) Iuliia Khrennikova (g)
  - Sprint U17 winners: (Finland) Niklas Ekström (b) / (Finland) Nina Karna (g)
  - Relay U17 winners: Finland (Seeti Salonen, Akseli Virtanen, Niklas Ekström) (b) / Russia 1 (Valeria Saranina, Zoya Chernykh, Iuliia Khrennikova) (g)
- March 20 – 24: Junior World Ski Orienteering Championships in Sweden
  - Long U20 winners: (Russia) Sergey Mizonov (m) / (Russia) Marina Vyatkina (f)
  - Middle U20 winners: (Norway) Jørgen Baklid (m) / (Russia) Aleksandra Rusakova (f)
  - Sprint U20 winners: (Switzerland) Nicola Mueller (m) / (Sweden) Sofia Westin (f)
  - Relay U20 winners: Russia 1 (Artemiy Dorma, German Sazykin, Sergey Mizonov) (m) / Russia 1 (Marina Vyatkina, Olesia Riazanova, Aleksandra Rusakova) (f)
- March 20 – 24: World Ski Orienteering Championships in Sweden
  - Long winners: (Russia) Andrey Lamov (m) / (Sweden) Tove Alexandersson (f)
  - Middle winners: (Sweden) Erik Rost (m) / (Russia) Maria Kechkina (f)
  - Sprint winners: (Sweden) Erik Rost & (Russia) Sergey Gorlanov (m) / (Sweden) Tove Alexandersson (f)
  - Relay winners: Russia (Vladislav Kiselev, Sergey Gorlanov, Andrey Lamov) (m) / Russia (Alena Trapeznikova, Tatyana Oborina, Mariya Kechkina) (f)
- March 21 – 24: World Masters Ski Orienteering Championships in Sweden
  - For Long Results here.
  - For Middle 1 Results here.
  - For Middle 2 Results here.

=== 2019 TrailO World Cup events ===
- No World Cup events this year scheduled.

World and Continental TrailO-orienteering events

- June 23 – 29: World Trail Orienteering Championships 2019 in (Portugal) Idanha-a-Nova
  - For detailed results, click here
- November 29 – December 2: Asian Trail Orienteering Championships 2019 in Hong Kong

== Pickleball ==
- Representing the first professional tours for the sport of pickleball, two independent professional pickleball tours were established, the Association of Pickleball Players (APP), originally the Association of Pickleball Professionals, and the Professional Pickleball Association (PPA).
- July 12: Bainbridge Cup played in Essen, Germany. Played concurrently with the German Open Pickleball Championships
- November 2 – 10: 2019 Margaritaville USA Pickleball National Championships in Indian Wells, California

== Roller sport ==
=== CERH ===
- October 20, 2018 – 12 May: 2018–19 Rink Hockey Euroleague
  - In the final, (Portugal) Sporting CP defeated (Portugal) Porto, 5–2, to win their 2nd title.
- October 20, 2018 – April 28: 2018–19 World Skate Europe Cup
  - In the final, (Spain) Lleida Llista Blava defeated (Italy) Sarzana, 6–3, to win their 2nd consecutive title.
- November 10, 2018 – March 17: 2018–19 Rink Hockey European Female League
  - In the final, (Spain) Voltregà defeated (Spain) Palau de Plegamans, 2–1 (a.e.t.), to win a 6th record title.

=== World Skate Europe Artistic skating ===
- May 2 – 4: European Show & Precision Championships in (Italy) Reggio Emilia
  - Junior Long winners: (Spain) Reus Deportiu
  - Precision Junior winners: (Israel) Milor
  - Small Groups Long winners: (Italy) Roma Roller
  - Youth Quartet Long winners: (Italy) Magic Skate
- May 7 – 11: German Cup in (Germany) Freiburg
  - For detailed results, click here.
- May 22 – 26: Sedmak Bressen Trophy in (Italy) Trieste
  - For detailed results, click here.
- August 30 – September 7: Cadet & Youth & Junior & Senior European Championships in (Germany) Harsefeld
- September 23 – 28: Cup of Europe in Italy
- October 10 – 13: Interland Trophy in (Switzerland) Basel

=== World Skate Europe In-Line Hockey ===
European Inline Cup 2019

- March 29 – 31: #1 in (Spain) Gijón
  - Winners: (Spain) Francisco José Peula Cabello & (France) Elton de Souza (m) / (Colombia) Aura Cristina Quintana Herrera & (France) Mathilde Pedronno (f)
- April 5 – 7: #2 in (Portugal) Lagos
  - Winners: (Portugal) Diogo Marreiros (m) (both) / (Colombia) Aura Cristina Quintana Herrera (f) (both)
- April 12 – 14: #3 in (Germany) Geisingen
  - Winners: (Portugal) Diogo Marreiros & (Germany) Simon Albrecht (m) / (Belgium) Sandrine Tas (f) (both)
- April 26 – 28: #4 in (Germany) Groß-Gerau
  - Winners: (Germany) Felix Rijhnen & (Venezuela) Jhoan Guzmán bitar (m) / (Belgium) Sandrine Tas (f) (both)
- May 3 – 5: #5 in (Netherlands) Heerde
  - Winners: (Portugal) Diogo Marreiros & (Venezuela) Jhoan Guzmán bitar (m) / (Italy) Francesca Lollobrigida & (Belgium) Sandrine Tas (f)
- May 17 – 19: #6 in (Germany) Gera
- May 30 – June 2: #7 in (Austria) Wörgl
- August 6 & 7: #8 in (Italy) Santa Maria Nuova
- August 8 – 10: #9 in (Belgium) Ostend (final)

Other competitions

- April 11 – 14: In-Line Hockey European League in (Italy) Roana
  - In the final, (France) Tigres de Garges defeated (Italy) HC Milano Quanta, 2–1. (Spain) CPL Valladolid took third place and (Slovakia) Mad Dogs Bratislava took fourth place.
- May 17 – 19: In-Line Hockey Women European League
  - In the final, (Spain) CPL Valladolid defeated (France) Les Phénix Ris Orangis, 3–1. (Spain) HCR Cent Patins took third place and (France) Les Owls RH took fourth place.
- August 1 – 4: Men's In-Line Hockey Under-16 & Under-18 Championships

=== FIRS ===
- June 30 – July 14: World Roller Games in (Spain) Barcelona
  - Italy won both gold and overall medal tallies.

== Rugby league ==
International competitions

- May 18: 2018–19 Rugby League European Championship C Final in (United Kingdom) London
  - Greece defeated Norway, 56–26, to win their second Rugby League European Championship C title.
- June 22 – November 9: 2019 Oceania Cup (rugby league)
  - Cup (Group A) winner: Australia
  - Shield (Group B) winner: Fiji
- October 2 – 5: 2019 MEA Rugby League Championship in Lagos
  - Nigeria defeated Morocco, 38–10, in the final. Ghana took third place.
- October 26 – November 10: 2019 Rugby League European play-off tournament
  - Qualified teams to the 2021 Rugby League World Cup: Ireland, Italy, Scotland, & Greece

Domestic competitions

- January 26 – August 24: (Canada) / (England) / (France) / (Scotland) / (Serbia) / (Wales) 2019 Challenge Cup
  - The Warrington Wolves defeated the St. Helens, 18–4, to win their ninth Challenge Cup title.
- January 31 – October 12: (England) / (France) Super League XXIV
  - The St Helens R.F.C. defeated the Salford Red Devils, 23–6, to win their seventh Super League title.
- February 3 – October 5: (Canada) / (England) / (France) 2019 RFL Championship
  - (Canada) Toronto Wolfpack defeated (England) Featherstone Rovers, 24–6, to win their second consecutive RFL Championship title.
- February 17 –: (England) / (Wales) 2019 RFL League 1
  - Champions: Whitehaven
- February 17: 2019 World Club Challenge in (United Kingdom) Wigan
  - (Australia) Sydney Roosters defeated (England) Wigan Warriors, 20–8, to win their third World Club Challenge title.
- March 9 – September 29: (Australia) / (Papua New Guinea) 2019 Intrust Super Cup QLD season
  - Burleigh Bears defeated Wynnum Manly Seagulls, 28–10, to win their fourth Queensland Cup title.
- March 14 – October 6: (Australia) / (New Zealand) 2019 NRL season
  - (Australia) Sydney Roosters defeated (Australia) Canberra Raiders, 14–8, to win their second consecutive and fourth overall National Rugby League title.
- March 15 – September 29: (Australia) / (New Zealand) 2019 Canterbury Cup NSW
  - (Australia) Newtown Jets defeated (Australia) Wentworthville Magpies, 20–15, to win their eighth Canterbury Cup NSW title.
- April 7 – October 13: (England) 2019 RFL Women's Super League
  - The Leeds Rhinos defeated the Castleford Tigers, 20–12, to win their first RFL Women's Super League title.
- May 4 – July 27: (England) 2019 RFL Women's Challenge Cup
  - The Leeds Rhinos defeated the Castleford Tigers, 16–10, to win their second RFL Women's Challenge Cup.

Rugby League Nines

- October 18 & 19: 2019 Rugby League World Cup 9s for Men & Women in Sydney (debut events)
  - Men: Australia defeated New Zealand, 24–10, to win the inaugural Men's Rugby League World Cup 9s title.
  - Women: New Zealand defeated Australia, 17–15, to win the inaugural Women's Rugby League World Cup 9s title.

== Shooting sports ==
=== World and continental shooting events ===
- March 16 – 25: 2019 10m European Shooting Championships in (Croatia) Osijek
  - Rifle
  - 10 m Air Rifle winners: (Russia) Vladimir Maslennikov (m) / (Romania) Laura-Georgeta Coman (f)
  - 10 m Mixed Air Rifle winners: Russia (Anastasiia Galashina & Vladimir Maslennikov)
  - 10 m Air Rifle Team winners: Russia (m) / Russia (f)
  - 10 m Junior Air Rifle winners: (Czech Republic) Filip Nepejchal (m) / (Denmark) Stephanie Laura Scurrah Grundsoee (f)
  - 10 m Junior Mixed Air Rifle winners: Russia (Tatiana Kharkova & Grigorii Shamakov)
  - 10 m Junior Air Rifle Team winners: Hungary (m) / Germany (f)
  - Pistol
  - 10 m Air Pistol winners: (Ukraine) Pavlo Korostylov (m) / (Poland) Klaudia Breś (f)
  - 10 m Mixed Air Pistol winners: Ukraine (Olena Kostevych & Oleh Omelchuk)
  - 10 m Air Pistol Team winners: Italy (m) / Germany (f)
  - 10 m Junior Air Pistol winners: (Russia) Anton Aristarkhov (m) / (Turkey) Sevval Ilayda Tarhan (f)
  - 10 m Junior Mixed Air Pistol winners: Ukraine (Yana Chuchmarova & Ihor Solovei)
  - 10 m Junior Air Pistol Team winners: Czech Republic (m) / Russia (f)
  - Running Target
  - 10 m Running Target winners: (Russia) Vladislav Prianishnikov (m) / (Russia) Julia Eydenzon (f)
  - 10 m Mixed Running Target Individual winners: (Finland) Krister Holmberg (m) / (Ukraine) Halyna Avramenko (f)
  - 10 m Mixed Running Target Team winners: Sweden (m) / Russia (f)
  - 10 m Mixed Running Target winners: Russia (Maxim Stepanov & Olga Stepanova)
  - 10 m Junior Running Target winners: (Finland) Aaro Juhani Vuorimaa (m) / (Hungary) Klaudia Palanki (f)
  - 10 m Junior Mixed Running Target winners: (Ukraine) Danylo Danilenko (m) / (Hungary) Klaudia Palanki (f)
- March 25 – April 2: 12th Asian Airgun Championship in (Chinese Taipei) Taoyuan
  - Rifle
  - 10 m Air Rifle winners: (India) Divyansh Singh Panwar (m) / (India) Elavenil Valarivan (f)
  - Junior 10 m Air Rifle winners: (India) Yash Vardhan (m) / (India) Shreya Agrawal (f)
  - 10 m Junior Mixed Air Rifle winners: India (Shreya Agrawal & Yash Vardhan)
  - Teams 10 m Air Rifle winners: India (f)
  - 10 m Junior Air Rifle Team winners: India (m) / India (f)
  - Pistol
  - 10 m Air Pistol winners: (South Korea) Mose Kim (m) / (India) Manu Bhaker (f)
  - 10 m Junior Air Pistol winners: (India) Sarabjot Singh (m) / (India) Esha Singh (f)
  - 10 m Mixed Air Pistol winners: South Korea (Park Sunmin & Minki Shin)
  - 10 m Junior Mixed Air Pistol winners: India (Esha Singh & Vijayveer Sidhu)
  - Women's 10 m Air Pistol Team winners: South Korea
  - 10 m Junior Air Pistol Team winners: India (m) / South Korea (f)
- June 30 – July 11: 2019 World Shotgun Championships in Lonato del Garda
  - Skeet winners: (Czech Republic) Tomas Nydrle (m) / (Italy) Diana Bacosi (f)
  - Mixed team Skeet winners: Italy (Gabriele Rossetti & Diana Bacosi)
  - Trap winners: (United Kingdom) Matthew Coward-Holley (m) / (United States) Ashley Carroll (f)
  - Double Trap winners: (Italy) Antonino Barillà (m) / (Italy) Claudia de Luca (f)
  - Mixed team Trap winners: Australia (Laetisha Scanlan & James Willett)
  - Junior Skeet winners: (Czech Republic) Daniel Korcak (m) / (Russia) Zilia Batyrshina (f)
  - Junior Mixed team Skeet winners: United States (Alexander Joseph Ahlin & Austen Smith)
  - Junior Trap winners: (Brazil) Leonardo Lustoza (m) / (Bulgaria) Selin Ali (f)
  - Men's Junior Double Trap winners: (Italy) Marco Carli
  - Junior Mixed team Trap winners: Czech Republic (Zina Hrdlickova & Fabio Beccari)
- August 3 – 10: 2019 IPSC Rifle World Shoot in Karlskoga, Sweden
  - Open winners: (Finland) Jarkko Laukia (m) / (United States) Ashley Rheuark (f)
  - Standard winner: (Finland) Sami Hautamäki
  - Manual Open winner: (Sweden) Jiro Nihei
  - Manual Standard winner: (Russia) Vladimir Chamyan
- November 1 – 9: 2019 Oceania Shooting Championship in (Australia) Sydney
- November 3 – 11: 2019 Asian Shooting Championship in (Qatar) Doha
- November 17 – 25: 2019 African Shooting Championship in (Algeria) Tipasa

=== 2019 ISSF World Cup ===
- February 20 – 28: Rifle and Pistol World Cup #1 in New Delhi
  - 10m Air Pistol winners: (India) Saurabh Chaudhary (m) / (Hungary) Veronika Major (f)
  - 10m Air Pistol Mixed team winners: India (Manu Bhaker & Saurabh Chaudhary)
  - 10m Air Rifle winners: (Russia) Sergey Kamenskiy (m) / (India) Apurvi Chandela (f)
  - 10m Air Rifle Mixed team winners: China (Zhao Ruozhu & LIU Yukun)
  - Men's 25m Rapid Fire Pistol winner: (Germany) Christian Reitz
  - Women's 25m Pistol winner: (Hungary) Veronika Major
  - 50m Rifle Three Positions winners: (Hungary) Istvan Peni (m) / (Switzerland) Nina Christen (f)
- March 15 – 26: Shotgun World Cup #1 in (Mexico) Acapulco
  - Trap winners: (Australia) James Willett (m) / (Italy) Jessica Rossi (f)
  - Trap Mixed team winners: Australia (Laetisha Scanlan & James Willett)
  - Skeet winners: (United States) Vincent Hancock (m) / (United States) Kim Rhode (f)
- April 5 – 16: Shotgun World Cup #2 in (United Arab Emirates) Al Ain
  - Trap winners: (Croatia) Josip Glasnović (m) / (France) Carole Cormenier (f)
  - Trap Mixed team winners: Germany (Katrin Quooss & Paul Pigorsch)
  - Skeet winners: (Kuwait) Mansour Al-Rashidi (m) / (United States) Kim Rhode (f)
- April 21 – 29: Rifle and Pistol World Cup #2 in (China) Beijing
  - 10m Air Pistol winners: (India) Abhishek Verma (m) / (South Korea) Kim Min-jung (f)
  - 10m Air Pistol Mixed team winners: India (Manu Bhaker & Saurabh Chaudhary)
  - 10m Air Rifle winners: (China) Hui Zicheng (m) / (Russia) Yulia Karimova (f)
  - 10m Air Rifle Mixed team winners: India (Anjum Moudgil & Divyansh Singh Panwar)
  - Men's 25m Rapid Fire Pistol winner: (China) Lin Junmin
  - Women's 25m Pistol winner: (Bulgaria) Maria Grozdeva
  - 50m Rifle Three Positions winners: (Czech Republic) Filip Nepejchal (m) / (Croatia) Snježana Pejčić (f)
- May 7 – 18: Shotgun World Cup #3 in (South Korea) Changwon
  - Trap winners: (Cyprus) Andreas Makri (m) / (China) DENG Weiyun (f)
  - Trap Mixed team winners: Italy (Silvana Stanco & Daniele Resca)
  - Skeet winners: (United States) Vincent Hancock (m) / (United States) Kim Rhode (f)
- May 24 – 31: Rifle and Pistol World Cup #3 in (Germany) Munich
  - 10m Air Pistol winners: (India) Saurabh Chaudhary (m) / (Greece) Anna Korakaki (f)
  - 10m Air Pistol Mixed team winners: India (Manu Bhaker & Saurabh Chaudhary)
  - 10m Air Rifle winners: (Czech Republic) Filip Nepejchal (m) / (India) Apurvi Chandela (f)
  - 10m Air Rifle Mixed team winners: India (Anjum Moudgil & Divyansh Singh Panwar)
  - Men's 25m Rapid Fire Pistol winner: (China) Lin Junmin
  - Women's 25m Pistol winner: (India) Rahi Sarnobat
  - 50m Rifle Three Positions winners: (China) Zhao Zhonghao (m) / (Russia) Yulia Zykova (f)
- July 12 – 20: Junior World Cup (All Guns) in Suhl
  - Junior 10m Air Pistol winners: (India) Sarabjot Singh (m) / (Turkey) Sevval Ilayda Tarhan (f)
  - Junior 10m Air Pistol Mixed team winners: Germany (Andrea Katharina Heckner & Robin Walter)
  - Junior 25m Pistol winners: (China) XIA Qi (m) / (Bulgaria) Miroslava Mincheva (f)
  - Junior Men's 25m Rapid Fire Pistol winner: (India) Anish Anish
  - Junior 25m Standard Pistol winners: (India) Udhayveer Sidhu (m) / (Thailand) Chawisa Paduka (f)
  - Junior 50m Pistol winners: (India) Gaurav Rana (m) / (Russia) Nadezhda Koloda (f)
  - Junior 10m Air Rifle winners: (Russia) Grigorii Shamakov (m) / (India) Elavenil Valarivan (f)
  - Junior 10m Air Rifle Mixed team winners: Iran (Armina Sadeghian & Amirsiyavash Zolfagharian)
  - Junior 50m Rifle Prone winners: (Austria) Stefan Wadlegger (m) / (Norway) Jeanette Hegg Duestad (f)
  - Junior 50m Rifle Three Positions winners: (India) Aishwary Pratap Singh Tomar (m) / (Germany) Anna Janssen (f)
  - Junior Skeet winners: (United States) Conner Lynn Prince (m) / (United States) Austen Jewell Smith (f)
  - Junior Trap winners: (Italy) Lorenzo Ferrari (m) / (United States) Faith Alexa Pendergrass (f)
  - Junior Trap Mixed team winners: China (ZHANG Ting & LI Siwei)
- August 13 – 23: Shotgun World Cup #4 in (Finland) Lahti
  - Trap winners: (Russia) Aleksey Alipov (m) / (Australia) Penny Smith (f)
  - Trap Mixed team winners: San Marino (Alessandra Perilli & Gian Marco Berti)
  - Skeet winners: (Italy) Luigi Lodde (m) / (China) Wei Meng (f)
- August 26 – September 3: Rifle and Pistol World Cup #4 in (Brazil) Rio de Janeiro
  - 10m Air Pistol winners: (India) Abhishek Verma (m) / (India) Yashaswini Singh Deswal (f)
  - 10m Air Pistol Mixed team winners: India (Manu Bhaker & Saurabh Chaudhary)
  - 10m Air Rifle winners: (China) Yu Haonan (m) / (India) Elavenil Valarivan (f)
  - 10m Air Rifle Mixed team winners: India (Apurvi Chandela & Deepak Kumar)
  - Men's 25m Rapid Fire Pistol winner: (Germany) Christian Reitz
  - Women's 25m Pistol winner: (Hungary) Veronika Major
  - 50m Rifle Three Positions winners: (Croatia) Petar Gorša (m) / (United Kingdom) Seonaid McIntosh (f)
- October 9 – 14: Shotgun World Cup #5 (final) in (United Arab Emirates) Al Ain
  - Skeet winners: (Italy) Luigi Lodde (m) / (China) Wei Meng (f)
  - Mixed Skeet winners:
  - Trap winners: (Italy) Mauro De Filippis (m) / (United States) Aeriel Skinner (f)
  - Mixed Trap winners:
- November 17 – 24: Rifle and Pistol World Cup #5 (final) in (China) Putian

== Softball ==
=== WBSC (Softball) ===
- June 13 – 23: 2019 Men's Softball World Championship in (Czech Republic) Prague-Havlíčkův Brod
  - Argentina defeated Japan, 3–2, to win their first Men's Softball World Championship title.
  - Canada took third place.
- July 23 – 27: Europe/Africa Softball 2020 Olympic Qualifier in (Netherlands) Utrecht
  - Italy defeated Great Britain, 5–0, to book their team and compete at the 2020 Summer Olympics.
- July 26 – 30: 2019 Women's U12 Softball World Cup in Tainan (debut event)
  - Chinese Taipei defeated Peru, 3–2, to win the inaugural Women's U12 Softball World Cup title.
  - The Czech Republic took third place. Indonesia took fourth place.
- August 10 – 17: 2019 Women's U19 Softball World Cup in Irvine
  - The United States defeated Japan, 4–3, to win their third consecutive and seventh overall Women's U19 Softball World Cup title.
  - Canada took third place.
- August 25 – September 1: Americas Softball 2020 Olympic Qualifier in Surrey
  - Champions: Mexico; Second: Canada; Third: Puerto Rico
  - Note: Both Mexico and Canada have qualified to compete at the 2020 Summer Olympics.
- September 24 –28: Asia/Oceania Softball 2020 Olympic Qualifier in Shanghai
  - Champions: Australia; Second: Chinese Taipei; Third: China
  - Note: Australia has qualified to compete at the 2020 Summer Olympics.

=== Little League Softball World Series ===
- July 28 – August 3: 2019 Junior League Softball World Series in (Washington (state)) Kirkland at Everest Park
  - Team USA Southeast Region ( (Florida) Interbay (Tampa)) defeated Team USA Southwest Region ( (Texas) Columbus), 7–6, in the final.
- July 29 – August 4: 2019 Senior League Softball World Series in Lower Sussex at Lower Sussex Little League Complex
  - Team USA Southwest Region ( (Texas) Waco) defeated Team Delaware D3 Region ( Laurel, Millsboro & Nanticoke Little Leagues), 7–5, in the final.
- August 7 – 14: 2019 Little League Softball World Series in (Oregon) Portland at Alpenrose Stadium
  - Team USA Southeast Region ( (North Carolina) Salisbury) defeated Team USA Southwest ( (Louisiana) River Ridge), 4–1, in the final.

== Wrestling ==
=== 2019 Wrestling Continental Championships ===
- 2019 World Wrestling Championships in (Kazakhstan) Nur-Sultan ⇒ 14–22 September
- 2019 European Wrestling Championships in (Romania) Bucharest ⇒ 8–14 April
- 2019 Asian Wrestling Championships in (China) Xi'an ⇒ 23–28 April
- 2019 Pan American Wrestling Championships in (Argentina) Buenos Aires ⇒ 19–21 April
- 2019 African Wrestling Championships in (Tunisia) Hammamet ⇒ 29–31 March
- Wrestling at the 2019 European Games in (Belarus) Misnk ⇒ 25–30 June
- Wrestling at the 2019 Pan American Games in (Peru) Lima ⇒ 7–10 August
- Wrestling at the 2019 African Games in (Morocco) El Jadida ⇒ 28–30 August
- 2019 Wrestling World Cup – Men's freestyle in (Russia) Yakutsk ⇒ 16–17 March
- 2019 Wrestling World Cup – Women's freestyle in (Japan) Narita ⇒ 16–17 November
- 2019 U23 World Wrestling Championships in (Hungary) Budapest ⇒ 28 October–3 November
- 2019 European U23 Wrestling Championship in (Serbia) Novi Sad ⇒ 4–10 March
- 2019 Asian U23 Wrestling Championship in (Mongolia) Ulaanbaatar ⇒ 21–24 March
- 2019 World Junior Wrestling Championships in (Estonia) Tallinn ⇒ 12–18 August
- 2019 European Juniors Wrestling Championships in (Spain) Pontevedra ⇒ 3–9 June
- 2019 Veterans World Wrestling Championships in (Georgia (country)) Tbilisi ⇒ 8–13 October
- Wrestling at the 2019 Military World Games in (China) Wuhan ⇒ 21–24 October
- 2019 World Beach Wrestling Championships in (Croatia) Zagreb ⇒ 7–8 September
- Wrestling at the 2019 European Youth Summer Olympic Festival in (Azerbaijan) Baku ⇒ 21–23 July
- 2019 World Cadet Wrestling Championships in (Bulgaria) Sofia ⇒ 29 July–4 August
- 2019 European Cadets Wrestling Championships in (Italy) Faenza ⇒ 17–23 June

== Ranking Series ==
Ranking Series Calendar 2019:

- 1st Ranking Series: 24–28 January, Russia, Krasnoyarsk ⇒ Golden Grand Prix Ivan Yarygin 2019 (FS, WW)
- 2nd Ranking Series: 9–10 February, Croatia, Zagreb ⇒ 2019 Grand Prix Zagreb Open (GR)
- 3rd Ranking Series: 23–24 February, Hungary, Győr ⇒ Hungarian Grand Prix - Polyák Imre Memorial (GR)
- 4th Ranking Series: 28 February-3 March, Bulgaria, Ruse ⇒ 2019 Dan Kolov & Nikola Petrov Tournament (FS, WW, GR)
- 5th Ranking Series: 23–25 May, Italy, Sassari ⇒ Matteo Pellicone Ranking Series 2019 (FS, WW, GR)
- 6th Ranking Series: 11–14 July, Turkey, Istanbul ⇒ 2019 Yasar Dogu Tournament (FS, WW)
- 7th Ranking Series: 28 February-3 March, Belarus, Minsk ⇒ 2019 Oleg Karavaev Tournament (GR)

=== 2019 Wrestling International tournament ===
- 2019 Vehbi Emre & Hamit Kaplan Tournament in (Turkey) Istanbul ⇒ 1–3 February
- Grand Prix de France Henri Deglane 2019 in Nice ⇒ 1–3 February
- 2019 Poland Open in Warsaw ⇒ 2–4 August
- 2019 Grand Prix of Germany in Dortmund ⇒ 3–4 August
- 2019 Grand Prix of Spain in Dortmund ⇒ 5–7 July
- Tbilisi Grand Prix of V. Balavadze and G. Kartozia in (Georgia (country)) Tbilisi ⇒ 7–11 August
- 2019 Grand Prix Moscow Alrosa in (Russia) Moscow ⇒ 29–30 November
- 2019 Takhti Cup in (Iran) Tehran ⇒ 24–28 January
- 2019 Klippan Lady Open in (Sweden) Klippan ⇒ 15–17 February
- 2019 Thor Masters in (Denmark) Nykobing Falster ⇒ 15–16 March
- 2019 Mongolia Open in Ulaanbaatar ⇒ 6–7 April
