= 2026 Asian Men's Club League Handball Championship =

28th Asian Men's Club League Handball Championship
البطولة الآسيوية الثامنة والعشرين للأندية أبطال الدوري لكرة اليد

Tournament details
- Host country: Kuwait
- City: Sabah Al-Salem
- Venue: 1 (in 1 host city)
- Dates: 6–17 June 2026
- Teams: 7 (from 1 confederation)

Final positions
- Champions: (Kuwait) Burgan (1st title)
- Runners-up: (Saudi Arabia) Al-Khaleej
- Third place: (Qatar) Al Duhail
- Fourth place: Al-Kuwait

Tournament statistics
- Matches played: 25
- Goals scored: 1,411 (56.44 per match)
- Top scorers: Mohsen Mahmoud (61 goals)

Awards
- Best player: Kosuke Yasuhira
- Best goalkeeper: Abdekrahman Homayed

The 2026 Asian Men's Club League Handball Championship was the 28th edition of Asia's premier club handball tournament organized by the Asian Handball Federation (AHF). The tournament was held in Sabah Al-Salem, Kuwait from 6 to 17 June 2026. It had initially been scheduled for 6–16 April 2026 but was later postponed owing to the United States–Israel–Iran conflict. and doubled as Asia's qualifying competition for the 20th IHF Men's Handball Club World Championship.

Sharjah SC were the defending champions, having won the previous edition, but were unable to retain their title, finishing bottom of the group phase. Burgan claimed their first continental title by defeating the previous edition's runners-up Al-Khaleej in the final.

== Format ==
The tournament was initially set to feature eight clubs and begin with a group stage, in which the teams would be divided into two groups. The top two teams from each group would then advance to the knockout stage, consisting of the semifinals, third-place match, and final.

Following the withdrawal of the Chinese club, reducing the number of participating teams to seven, the competition format was revised in accordance with the AHF Competition Regulations. The seven teams were placed in a single round-robin group, with each team playing the others once. The top four teams advanced to the semifinals, where the group winners faced the fourth-placed team and the runners-up faced the third-placed team. The winners of the semifinals progressed to the final, while the losers contested the third-place match.

== Participating teams ==
Initially, a total of eight clubs from six member associations entered the tournament. However, CHA Club of China withdrew after the draw, reducing the number of participating teams to seven.

Association	Team	Qualifying method
Kuwait	Al-Kuwait SC	2024–25 Kuwait Handball Premier League Champions
Kuwait	Burgan SC	2024–25 Kuwait Handball Premier League Runners-up
Qatar	Al Arabi SC	2024–25 Qatar Handball League Championship Champions
Qatar	Al Duhail SC	2024–25 Qatar Handball League Championship Runners-up
Bahrain	Al-Najma SC	2024–25 Bahraini Handball League Champions
Saudi Arabia	Al-Khaleej Club	2024–25 Saudi Handball League Champions
United Arab Emirates	Sharjah SC	2025–26 UAE Handball League Champions

== Group stage ==
Pos	Team	Pld	W	D	L	GF	GA	GD	Pts	Qualification
1	(Saudi Arabia) Al-Khaleej	6	4	1	1	175	170	+5	9 (Note: Head-to-head: Al-Khaleej 26–25 Burgan)	Semifinals
2	(Kuwait) Burgan	6	4	1	1	163	145	+18	9	Semifinals
3	(Qatar) Al Duhail	6	3	1	2	171	165	+6	7	Semifinals
4	Al-Kuwait	6	2	1	3	168	170	−2	5 (Note: Head-to-head points: Al-Kuwait 4, Al-Najma 1, Al-Arabi 1)	Semifinals
5	(Bahrain) Al-Najma	6	2	1	3	166	167	−1	5	
6	(Qatar) Al Arabi	6	1	3	2	157	158	−1	5	
7	(United Arab Emirates) Sharjah	6	1	0	5	159	184	−25	2	

Source: AHF
Rules for classification: 1) points; 2) head-to-head points; 3) head-to-head goal difference; 4) head-to-head goals scored; 5) goal difference.
Notes:

6 June 2026; 16:00	Burgan (Kuwait)	29–28	(Qatar) Al Duhail	Saad Al-Abdullah Hall, Sabah Al-Salem; Referees: Ali, Al-Aradi (BHR)
6 June 2026; 16:00	Mahmoud 7	(13–14)	Dedu 5	Saad Al-Abdullah Hall, Sabah Al-Salem; Referees: Ali, Al-Aradi (BHR)
6 June 2026; 16:00	2× (suspension)	Report	4× (suspension)	Saad Al-Abdullah Hall, Sabah Al-Salem; Referees: Ali, Al-Aradi (BHR)

6 June 2026; 18:00	Al-Kuwait	27–22	(Qatar) Al Arabi	Saad Al-Abdullah Hall, Sabah Al-Salem; Attendance: 1,000; Referees: Al-Shahi, Al Wahibi (OMA)
6 June 2026; 18:00	Kuzmanovski, Lipovina 5	(16–9)	Denguir 6	Saad Al-Abdullah Hall, Sabah Al-Salem; Attendance: 1,000; Referees: Al-Shahi, Al Wahibi (OMA)
6 June 2026; 18:00	1× (suspension)	Report	1× (suspension)	Saad Al-Abdullah Hall, Sabah Al-Salem; Attendance: 1,000; Referees: Al-Shahi, Al Wahibi (OMA)

6 June 2026; 20:00	Al-Khaleej (Saudi Arabia)	32–30	(United Arab Emirates) Sharjah	Saad Al-Abdullah Hall, Sabah Al-Salem; Attendance: 1,900; Referees: Kha. Ismoilov, Khu Ismoilov (UZB)
6 June 2026; 20:00	Al-Sayyad 9	(17–12)	three players 6	Saad Al-Abdullah Hall, Sabah Al-Salem; Attendance: 1,900; Referees: Kha. Ismoilov, Khu Ismoilov (UZB)
6 June 2026; 20:00	3× (suspension)	Report	3× (suspension)	Saad Al-Abdullah Hall, Sabah Al-Salem; Attendance: 1,900; Referees: Kha. Ismoilov, Khu Ismoilov (UZB)

7 June 2026; 16:00	Al Arabi (Qatar)	28–28	(Saudi Arabia) Al-Khaleej	Saad Al-Abdullah Hall, Sabah Al-Salem; Attendance: 2,000; Referees: Al-Enezi, Al-Naseem (KUW)
7 June 2026; 16:00	Tskhovrebadze, Al-Taieb 6	(13–16)	Mo. Al-Salem 6	Saad Al-Abdullah Hall, Sabah Al-Salem; Attendance: 2,000; Referees: Al-Enezi, Al-Naseem (KUW)
7 June 2026; 16:00	3× (suspension)	Report	4× (suspension)	Saad Al-Abdullah Hall, Sabah Al-Salem; Attendance: 2,000; Referees: Al-Enezi, Al-Naseem (KUW)

7 June 2026; 18:00	Al-Kuwait	30–26	(Bahrain) Al-Najma	Saad Al-Abdullah Hall, Sabah Al-Salem; Attendance: 1,500; Referees: Cha, Pak (KOR)
7 June 2026; 18:00	Iturriza 7	(16–8)	Al-Zaimaar 6	Saad Al-Abdullah Hall, Sabah Al-Salem; Attendance: 1,500; Referees: Cha, Pak (KOR)
7 June 2026; 18:00	1× (suspension)	Report	4× (suspension)	Saad Al-Abdullah Hall, Sabah Al-Salem; Attendance: 1,500; Referees: Cha, Pak (KOR)

7 June 2026; 20:00	Sharjah (United Arab Emirates)	18–26	(Kuwait) Burgan	Saad Al-Abdullah Hall, Sabah Al-Salem; Attendance: 1,000; Referees: Al-Wahibi, Al-Shahi (OMA)
7 June 2026; 20:00	Al-Maazmi 5	(5–11)	Mahmoud 9	Saad Al-Abdullah Hall, Sabah Al-Salem; Attendance: 1,000; Referees: Al-Wahibi, Al-Shahi (OMA)
7 June 2026; 20:00	1× (suspension)	Report	6× (suspension)	Saad Al-Abdullah Hall, Sabah Al-Salem; Attendance: 1,000; Referees: Al-Wahibi, Al-Shahi (OMA)

8 June 2026; 16:00	Al-Najma (Bahrain)	25–29	(Qatar) Al Duhail	Saad Al-Abdullah Hall, Sabah Al-Salem; Attendance: 1,000; Referees: Al-Enezi, Al-Naseem (KUW)
8 June 2026; 16:00	Ahmed 10	(15–15)	Hadj Ayed 5	Saad Al-Abdullah Hall, Sabah Al-Salem; Attendance: 1,000; Referees: Al-Enezi, Al-Naseem (KUW)
8 June 2026; 16:00	7× (suspension)	Report	4× (suspension) 2× (red card)	Saad Al-Abdullah Hall, Sabah Al-Salem; Attendance: 1,000; Referees: Al-Enezi, Al-Naseem (KUW)

8 June 2026; 18:00	Al-Khaleej (Saudi Arabia)	34–31	Al-Kuwait	Saad Al-Abdullah Hall, Sabah Al-Salem; Attendance: 3,000; Referees: Kha. Ismoilov, Khu Ismoilov (UZB)
8 June 2026; 18:00	Mohamed 10	(19–16)	Lipovina 9	Saad Al-Abdullah Hall, Sabah Al-Salem; Attendance: 3,000; Referees: Kha. Ismoilov, Khu Ismoilov (UZB)
8 June 2026; 18:00	6× (suspension) 2× (red card)	Report	3× (suspension)	Saad Al-Abdullah Hall, Sabah Al-Salem; Attendance: 3,000; Referees: Kha. Ismoilov, Khu Ismoilov (UZB)

8 June 2026; 20:00	Al Arabi (Qatar)	25–25	(Kuwait) Burgan	Saad Al-Abdullah Hall, Sabah Al-Salem; Attendance: 1,000; Referees: Ali, Al-Aradi (BHR)
8 June 2026; 20:00	Turchenko 6	(14–13)	Mahmoud 9	Saad Al-Abdullah Hall, Sabah Al-Salem; Attendance: 1,000; Referees: Ali, Al-Aradi (BHR)
8 June 2026; 20:00	6× (suspension)	Report	3× (suspension)	Saad Al-Abdullah Hall, Sabah Al-Salem; Attendance: 1,000; Referees: Ali, Al-Aradi (BHR)

10 June 2026; 16:00	Al-Khaleej (Saudi Arabia)	26–25	(Kuwait) Burgan	Saad Al-Abdullah Hall, Sabah Al-Salem; Attendance: 1,500; Referees: Al-Wahibi, Al-Shahi (OMA)
10 June 2026; 16:00	Mo. Al-Salem 9	(13–14)	Mahmoud 8	Saad Al-Abdullah Hall, Sabah Al-Salem; Attendance: 1,500; Referees: Al-Wahibi, Al-Shahi (OMA)
10 June 2026; 16:00	6× (suspension)	Report	3× (suspension)	Saad Al-Abdullah Hall, Sabah Al-Salem; Attendance: 1,500; Referees: Al-Wahibi, Al-Shahi (OMA)

10 June 2026; 18:00	Al Duhail (Qatar)	28–28	Al-Kuwait	Saad Al-Abdullah Hall, Sabah Al-Salem; Attendance: 2,000; Referees: Cha, Pak (KOR)
10 June 2026; 18:00	Madadi 6	(13–12)	Lipovina 8	Saad Al-Abdullah Hall, Sabah Al-Salem; Attendance: 2,000; Referees: Cha, Pak (KOR)
10 June 2026; 18:00	1× (suspension)	Report	3× (suspension) 2× (red card)	Saad Al-Abdullah Hall, Sabah Al-Salem; Attendance: 2,000; Referees: Cha, Pak (KOR)

10 June 2026; 20:00	Al-Najma (Bahrain)	32–27	(United Arab Emirates) Sharjah	Saad Al-Abdullah Hall, Sabah Al-Salem; Attendance: 500; Referees: Al-Naseem, Al-Enezi (KUW)
10 June 2026; 20:00	Khamis 6	(15–12)	Mahmud 10	Saad Al-Abdullah Hall, Sabah Al-Salem; Attendance: 500; Referees: Al-Naseem, Al-Enezi (KUW)
10 June 2026; 20:00	4× (suspension)	Report	1× (suspension)	Saad Al-Abdullah Hall, Sabah Al-Salem; Attendance: 500; Referees: Al-Naseem, Al-Enezi (KUW)

11 June 2026; 16:00	Al Arabi (Qatar)	30–30	(Bahrain) Al-Najma	Saad Al-Abdullah Hall, Sabah Al-Salem; Attendance: 600; Referees: Cha, Pak (KOR)
11 June 2026; 16:00	Turchenko 8	(17–18)	Mitrović 7	Saad Al-Abdullah Hall, Sabah Al-Salem; Attendance: 600; Referees: Cha, Pak (KOR)
11 June 2026; 16:00	4× (suspension)	Report	3× (suspension)	Saad Al-Abdullah Hall, Sabah Al-Salem; Attendance: 600; Referees: Cha, Pak (KOR)

11 June 2026; 18:00	Burgan (Kuwait)	30–24	Al-Kuwait	Saad Al-Abdullah Hall, Sabah Al-Salem; Attendance: 2,000; Referees: Kha. Ismoilov, Khu Ismoilov (UZB)
11 June 2026; 18:00	Mahmoud 8	(15–11)	Monte 9	Saad Al-Abdullah Hall, Sabah Al-Salem; Attendance: 2,000; Referees: Kha. Ismoilov, Khu Ismoilov (UZB)
11 June 2026; 18:00	6× (suspension)	Report	4× (suspension)	Saad Al-Abdullah Hall, Sabah Al-Salem; Attendance: 2,000; Referees: Kha. Ismoilov, Khu Ismoilov (UZB)

11 June 2026; 20:00	Sharjah (United Arab Emirates)	31–34	(Qatar) Al Duhail	Saad Al-Abdullah Hall, Sabah Al-Salem; Attendance: 600; Referees: Al-Wahibi, Al-Shahi (OMA)
11 June 2026; 20:00	Sanaï 9	(15–19)	Madadi 6	Saad Al-Abdullah Hall, Sabah Al-Salem; Attendance: 600; Referees: Al-Wahibi, Al-Shahi (OMA)
11 June 2026; 20:00	1× (suspension)	Report		Saad Al-Abdullah Hall, Sabah Al-Salem; Attendance: 600; Referees: Al-Wahibi, Al-Shahi (OMA)

12 June 2026; 16:00	Burgan (Kuwait)	28–24	(Bahrain) Al-Najma	Saad Al-Abdullah Hall, Sabah Al-Salem; Attendance: 1,500; Referees: Kha. Ismoilov, Khu Ismoilov (UZB)
12 June 2026; 16:00	Mahmoud 11	(14–13)	Al-Junaid, Shubbar 5	Saad Al-Abdullah Hall, Sabah Al-Salem; Attendance: 1,500; Referees: Kha. Ismoilov, Khu Ismoilov (UZB)
12 June 2026; 16:00	4× (suspension)	Report	3× (suspension)	Saad Al-Abdullah Hall, Sabah Al-Salem; Attendance: 1,500; Referees: Kha. Ismoilov, Khu Ismoilov (UZB)

12 June 2026; 18:00	Al Duhail (Qatar)	27–32	(Saudi Arabia) Al-Khaleej	Saad Al-Abdullah Hall, Sabah Al-Salem; Referees: Al-Naseem, Al-Enezi (KUW)
12 June 2026; 18:00	Madadi 7	(12–18)	Al-Sihati 7	Saad Al-Abdullah Hall, Sabah Al-Salem; Referees: Al-Naseem, Al-Enezi (KUW)
12 June 2026; 18:00	6× (suspension)	Report	4× (suspension)	Saad Al-Abdullah Hall, Sabah Al-Salem; Referees: Al-Naseem, Al-Enezi (KUW)

12 June 2026; 20:00	Sharjah (United Arab Emirates)	23–32	(Qatar) Al Arabi	Saad Al-Abdullah Hall, Sabah Al-Salem; Attendance: 500; Referees: Ali, Al-Aradi (BHR)
12 June 2026; 20:00	Radwan 7	(12–14)	Tskhovrebadze 9	Saad Al-Abdullah Hall, Sabah Al-Salem; Attendance: 500; Referees: Ali, Al-Aradi (BHR)
12 June 2026; 20:00	2× (suspension)	Report	1× (suspension)	Saad Al-Abdullah Hall, Sabah Al-Salem; Attendance: 500; Referees: Ali, Al-Aradi (BHR)

14 June 2026; 16:00	Al Duhail (Qatar)	25–20	(Qatar) Al Arabi	Saad Al-Abdullah Hall, Sabah Al-Salem; Attendance: 500; Referees: Cha, Pak (KOR)
14 June 2026; 16:00	Madadi 6	(13–9)	four players 3	Saad Al-Abdullah Hall, Sabah Al-Salem; Attendance: 500; Referees: Cha, Pak (KOR)
14 June 2026; 16:00	2× (suspension)	Report	1× (yellow card) 1× (red card)	Saad Al-Abdullah Hall, Sabah Al-Salem; Attendance: 500; Referees: Cha, Pak (KOR)

14 June 2026; 18:00	Al-Kuwait	28–30	(United Arab Emirates) Sharjah	Saad Al-Abdullah Hall, Sabah Al-Salem; Referees: Al-Wahibi, Al-Shahi (OMA)
14 June 2026; 18:00	Kuzmanovski 7	(15–17)	Radwan 12	Saad Al-Abdullah Hall, Sabah Al-Salem; Referees: Al-Wahibi, Al-Shahi (OMA)
14 June 2026; 18:00	2× (suspension)	Report	2× (suspension)	Saad Al-Abdullah Hall, Sabah Al-Salem; Referees: Al-Wahibi, Al-Shahi (OMA)

14 June 2026; 20:00	Al-Najma (Bahrain)	29–23	(Saudi Arabia) Al-Khaleej	Saad Al-Abdullah Hall, Sabah Al-Salem; Attendance: 1,000; Referees: Al-Naseem, Al-Enezi (KUW)
14 June 2026; 20:00	Habib 8	(14–12)	Al-Sadoon 7	Saad Al-Abdullah Hall, Sabah Al-Salem; Attendance: 1,000; Referees: Al-Naseem, Al-Enezi (KUW)
14 June 2026; 20:00	4× (suspension)	Report	1× (suspension) 1× (red card)	Saad Al-Abdullah Hall, Sabah Al-Salem; Attendance: 1,000; Referees: Al-Naseem, Al-Enezi (KUW)

== Knockout stage ==
=== Bracket ===
Semi-finals
15 June
(Kuwait) Burgan	32
(Qatar) Al Duhail	31
15 June
(Saudi Arabia) Al-Khaleej	29
Al-Kuwait	24

Final
17 June
(Kuwait) Burgan (ET)	34
(Saudi Arabia) Al-Khaleej	32
Third place
17 June
(Qatar) Al Duhail (Pen)	36
Al-Kuwait	34

=== Semifinals ===
15 June 2026; 17:00	Burgan (Kuwait)	32–31	(Qatar) Al Duhail	Saad Al-Abdullah Hall, Sabah Al-Salem; Attendance: 2,000; Referees: Cha, Pak (KOR)
15 June 2026; 17:00	Yasuhira, Al-Mutawa 7	(14–16)	Langaro 8	Saad Al-Abdullah Hall, Sabah Al-Salem; Attendance: 2,000; Referees: Cha, Pak (KOR)
15 June 2026; 17:00	2× (suspension)	Report	3× (suspension) 1× (red card)	Saad Al-Abdullah Hall, Sabah Al-Salem; Attendance: 2,000; Referees: Cha, Pak (KOR)

15 June 2026; 19:30	Al-Khaleej (Saudi Arabia)	29–24	Al-Kuwait	Saad Al-Abdullah Hall, Sabah Al-Salem; Referees: Al-Wahibi, Al-Shahi (OMA)
15 June 2026; 19:30	Al-Salem 7	(12–10)	Lipovina 9	Saad Al-Abdullah Hall, Sabah Al-Salem; Referees: Al-Wahibi, Al-Shahi (OMA)
15 June 2026; 19:30	2× (suspension)	Report	5× (suspension) 1× (red card)	Saad Al-Abdullah Hall, Sabah Al-Salem; Referees: Al-Wahibi, Al-Shahi (OMA)

=== Third place game ===
17 June 2026
17:00
Al Duhail (Qatar)
36–34
Al-Kuwait
Saad Al-Abdullah Hall, Sabah Al-Salem
Attendance: 2,000
Referees: Ali, Al-Aradi (BHR)
Capote 5
(17–18)
Iturriza 10
2× (suspension)
Report
1× (red card)

FT: 33–33 Pen: 3–1

=== Final ===
17 June 2026
19:30
Burgan (Kuwait)
34–32 (ET)
(Saudi Arabia) Al-Khaleej
Saad Al-Abdullah Hall, Sabah Al-Salem
Referees: Kha. Ismoilov, Khu Ismoilov (UZB)
Yasuhira 9
(13–14)
Al-Traiki 6
5× (suspension)
Report
2× (suspension)

FT: 27–27 ET: 7–5

== Statistics ==
=== Top goalscorers ===
Rank	Name	Club	Goals	Shots	%
1	(Egypt) Mohsen Mahmoud	(Kuwait) Burgan	61	100	61
2	(Montenegro) Vladan Lipovina	Al-Kuwait	45	61	74
3	(Qatar) Ahmad Madadi	(Qatar) Al Duhail	40	59	68
4	(Saudi Arabia) Mojtaba Al-Salem	(Saudi Arabia) Al-Khaleej	36	51	71
4	(Japan) Kosuke Yasuhira	(Kuwait) Burgan	36	47	77
6	(Bahrain) Mohamed Habib	(Saudi Arabia) Al-Khaleej	35	55	64
7	(Kuwait) Husain Al-Mutawa	(Kuwait) Burgan	34	45	76
8	(Georgia (country)) Giorgi Tskhovrebadze	(Qatar) Al Arabi	33	57	58
8	(Portugal) Victor Iturriza	Al-Kuwait	33	49	67
10	(Egypt) Mahmoud Radwan	(United Arab Emirates) Sharjah	32	42	76

=== Top goalkeepers ===
Rank	Name	Club	%	Saves	Shots
1	(Qatar) Yousuf Bader	(Qatar) Al Arabi	42	20	48
2	(Kuwait) Mohammad Buyabes	(Kuwait) Burgan	31	21	68
3	(Egypt) Abdelrahman Homayed	(Kuwait) Burgan	30	65	215
4	(Kuwait) Hasan Safar	Al-Kuwait	29	57	199
5	(Egypt) Karim Hendawy	(Qatar) Al Duhail	27	69	255
6	(Qatar) Irhad Alihodžić	(Qatar) Al Arabi	27	15	56
7	(Qatar) Ahmed El-Meniawy	(Qatar) Al Arabi	27	30	112
8	(Croatia) Kristian Pilipović	(Saudi Arabia) Al-Khaleej	26	54	204
9	(United Arab Emirates) Abdullah Al-Saadi	(United Arab Emirates) Sharjah	25	29	116
10	(Egypt) Hamad Shamlan	(Bahrain) Al-Najma	25	1	4
