= 2021–22 Croatian Handball Premier League =

Handball season

Croatian Premier League
- Season: 2021–22
- Dates: 10 September 2021 – 29 May 2022
- Champion: PPD Zagreb (30th title)
- Relegated: Karlovac; Umag; Spačva Vinkovci; Dubrovnik RKHM
- Champions League: Zagreb
- European League: Nexe
- European Cup: Sesvete; Dubrava

The 2021–22 Croatian Handball Premier League (known as the Paket24 Premijer liga for sponsorship reasons) was the 30th season of the Premier League, Croatian premier handball league. It ran from 10 September 2021 to 29 May 2022.

PPD Zagreb won their thirtieth title.

== Teams ==
Locations of the 2021–22 Croatian Premier League

=== Arenas and locations ===
The following 16 clubs compete in the Premier League during the 2021–22 season:

Team	Location	Arena	Capacity
Bjelovar	Bjelovar	Dvorana Europskih prvaka	1,500
Dubrava	Zagreb	ŠD Dubrava	2,000
Dubrovnik	Dubrovnik	ŠD Gospino polje	1,400
Gorica	Velika Gorica	Gradska dvorana Velika Gorica	
Karlovac	Karlovac	SŠD Mladost	2,750
Moslavina	Kutina	Športski centar Kutina	1,300
Nexe	Našice	Sportska dvorana kralja Tomislava	2,500
Poreč	Poreč	SRC Veli Jože	
Rudar	Samobor, Rude	Sportskva dvorana OŠ Rude	
Sesvete	Sesvete, Zagreb	Srednja škola Jelkovec	700
Spačva Vinkovci	Vinkovci	OŠ Barola Kašića Vinkovci	800
Trogir	Trogir	ŠD Trogir	
Umag	Umag		
Varaždin 1930	Varaždin	Varaždin Arena	5,200
Zagreb	Zagreb	Arena Zagreb; Dvorana Sutinska vrela	15,024; 2,000
Zamet	Rijeka	Centar Zamet	2,350

Clubs that play in the 2021–22 SEHA League

== Regular season ==
=== League A ===
Pos	Team	Pld	W	D	L	GF	GA	GD	Pts	Qualification or relegation
1	PPD Zagreb	14	14	0	0	473	311	+162	28	Qualification to Championship round
2	Gorica	14	7	3	4	414	379	+35	17	Qualification to Championship round
3	Poreč	14	6	2	6	341	359	−18	14 (Note: Poreč is ahead of Dubrava on head-to-head results: 49–49. Goal difference: Poreč: +25)	Qualification to Championship round
4	Dubrava	14	7	0	7	377	420	−43	14	Qualification to Relegation round
5	Umag	14	6	0	8	374	401	−27	12	Qualification to Relegation round
6	Karlovac	14	5	0	9	368	414	−46	10	Qualification to Relegation round
7	Rudar	14	3	3	8	350	377	−27	9	Qualification to Relegation round
8	Spačva Vinkovci	14	3	2	9	407	443	−36	8	Qualification to Relegation round

Source: Croatian Handball Federation - Liga A (in Croatian), Flashscore
Rules for classification: 1) points; 2) head-to-head points; 3) goal difference; 4) goals scored; 5) head-to-head goal difference; 6) head-to-head number of goals scored.

=== League B ===
Pos	Team	Pld	W	D	L	GF	GA	GD	Pts	Qualification or relegation
1	Nexe	14	14	0	0	501	342	+159	28	Qualification to Championship round
2	Sesvete	14	9	1	4	417	378	+39	19	Qualification to Championship round
3	Varaždin 1930	14	7	1	6	403	421	−18	15	Qualification to Championship round
4	Trogir	14	6	2	6	384	375	+9	14	Qualification to Relegation round
5	Bjelovar	14	5	2	7	396	413	−17	12 (Note: Head-to-head points: Bjelovar 6, Zamet 4, Moslavina 2.)	Qualification to Relegation round
6	Zamet	14	6	0	8	430	415	+15	12	Qualification to Relegation round
7	Moslavina	14	6	0	8	389	411	−22	12	Qualification to Relegation round
8	Dubrovnik	14	0	0	14	353	518	−165	0	Qualification to Relegation round

Source: Croatian Handball Federation - Liga B (in Croatian), Flashscore
Rules for classification: 1) points; 2) head-to-head points; 3) goal difference; 4) goals scored; 5) head-to-head goal difference; 6) head-to-head number of goals scored.

== Second round ==
=== Championship round ===
The top eight teams from the regular season play in the relegation round. Teams play each other once.

==== League table ====
Pos	Team	Pld	W	D	L	GF	GA	GD	Pts	Qualification
1	PPD Zagreb	10	9	0	1	325	228	+97	18	Advance to the Finals
2	Nexe	10	8	0	2	328	241	+87	16	Advance to the Finals
3	Sesvete	10	5	1	4	294	297	−3	11	Advance to the Third place series
4	Gorica	10	4	1	5	279	291	−12	9	Advance to the Third place series
5	Varaždin 1930	10	1	1	8	247	340	−93	3 (Note: Varaždin 1930 is ahead of Poreč on head-to-head results: 47–46.)	
6	Poreč	10	1	1	8	214	290	−76	3	

Source: Croatian Handball Federation - Liga za prvaka (in Croatian), Flashscore
Rules for classification: 1) points; 2) head-to-head points; 3) goal difference; 4) goals scored; 5) head-to-head goal difference; 6) head-to-head number of goals scored.

=== Relegation round ===
The bottom eight teams from the regular season play in the relegation round. Teams play each other once.

==== League table ====
Pos	Team	Pld	W	D	L	GF	GA	GD	Pts	Qualification or relegation
7	Bjelovar	18	12	1	5	519	482	+37	25	
8	Dubrava	18	10	2	6	503	491	+12	22	
9	Trogir	18	10	1	7	518	484	+34	21	
10	Zamet	18	9	2	7	535	495	+40	20 (Note: Zamet is ahead of Moslavina on head-to-head results: 63–47.)	
11	Moslavina	18	10	0	8	524	518	+6	20	
12	Rudar	18	9	1	8	495	477	+18	19 (Note: Rudar is ahead of Karlovac on head-to-head results: 51–50.)	
13	Karlovac (R)	18	9	1	8	510	504	+6	19	Qualification for Relegation play-offs
14	Umag (R)	18	8	0	10	504	522	−18	16	Qualification for Relegation play-offs
15	Spačva Vinkovci (R)	18	7	1	10	529	531	−2	15	Relegated to Croatian First League
16	Dubrovnik (R)	18	1	1	16	461	594	−133	3	Relegated to Croatian First League

Source: Croatian Handball Federation - Liga za ostanak (in Croatian), Flashscore
Rules for classification: 1) points; 2) head-to-head points; 3) goal difference; 4) goals scored; 5) head-to-head goal difference; 6) head-to-head number of goals scored.
(R) Relegated

== Playoffs ==
=== Finals ===
Team 1	Points	Team 2	Championship round		Game 1	Game 2	Game 3
PPD Zagreb	6–2	Nexe	29−30	25−16	31−26	26−24	–

PPD Zagreb won the Final series 6–2 with points ratio.

=== Third place series ===
Team 1	Points	Team 2	Championship round		Game 1	Game 2	Game 3
Sesvete	7–3	Gorica	30−30	31−30	25−25	26−26	28−25

Sesvete won the Third place series 7–3 with points ratio.

== Promotion/relegation play-offs ==
Two legged relegation play-off matches will be played between the teams placed 13th and 14th at the end of relegation round and the teams placed 2nd at the end of Croatian First League North and South Division.

Team 1	Agg.	Team 2	1st leg	2nd leg
Karlovac (I)	55–57	(II) Metković-Mehanika	33–35	22–22
Umag (I)	49–49 (a)	(II) KTC Križevci	30–24	19–25

== Final standings ==
Pos	Team	Pld	W	D	L	Qualification or relegation
1	PPD Zagreb (C)	26	25	0	1	Qualification for Champions League group phase
2	Nexe	26	22	0	4	Qualification for European League second qualifying round
3	Sesvete	27	15	4	8	Qualification for European Cup second qualifying round
4	Gorica	27	11	6	10	Qualification for European Cup second qualifying round
5	Varaždin 1930	24	8	2	14	
6	Poreč	24	7	3	14	
7	Bjelovar	32	17	3	12	
8	Dubrava	32	17	2	13	
9	Trogir	32	16	3	13	
10	Zamet	32	15	2	15	
11	Moslavina	32	16	0	16	
12	Rudar	32	12	4	16	
13	Karlovac (R)	32	14	1	17	Relegated to Croatian First League
14	Umag (R)	32	14	0	18	Relegated to Croatian First League
15	Spačva Vinkovci (R)	32	10	3	19	Relegated to Croatian First League
16	Dubrovnik (R)	32	1	1	30	Relegated to Croatian First League

Source: Croatian Handball Federation
(C) Champions; (R) Relegated

== See also ==
- 2021–22 Croatian Cup
