= Olympiacos H.C. =

Greek handball club

Olympiacos SFP HC
- Full name: Olympiacós Sýndesmos Filáthlon Peiraiós/ Xyni Group Handball Club
- Nicknames: Thrylos (The Legend); Erythrolefkoi (The Red-Whites)
- Short name: Olympiacos
- Founded: 2017; 9 years ago
- Arena: Ilioupoli Indoor Hall
- Capacity: 1,500
- President: Michalis Kountouris
- Head coach: Riccardo Trillini
- League: Handball Premier
- 2025–26: Handball Premier, 1st
- Club colours
Home	Away

Olympiacos Handball Club (currently known for sponsorship reasons as Olympiacos S.F.P. / Omilos Xini) is the men's handball team of the major Greek multi-sport club Olympiacos SFP, based in Piraeus. It was founded initially in 1931 and reorganized in 2017. The department has won 6 Greek Handball Championships, 4 Greek Cups, 4 Greek Super Cups (a record) and has achieved the Double 2 times.

Location of Olympiacos H.C.

== History ==
In 2017–18 season, which was the first after its reorganization, Olympiacos won the domestic double. They won the Greek Handball Championship by beating AEK Athens with 3–2 wins in the finals in a dramatic fashion, as they overturned an initial 0–2 win by AEK and took three straight wins to secure the League title. They also won the Greek Cup, beating PAOK in the semi-final and ASE Douka in the final to complete the domestic Double. On 10 September 2022, Olympiacos lifted the Greek Super Cup after winning AESH Pylaia in the final.

== Crest, colours, supporters ==
=== Kits ===
HOME
2019–20	2020–21	2021–24

AWAY

2023–24

== Team ==
=== Current squad ===
Squad for the 2025–26 season

Olympiacos H.C.

Goalkeepers

- 1 (Portugal) Diogo Valério
- 12 (Greece) Panagiotis Papantonopoulos
- 88 (Greece) Filippos Nikolidais

Left Wingers

- 10 (Greece) Grigoris Tzimpoulas
- 27 (Poland) Cezary Surgiel

Right Wingers

- 4 (Chile) Luciano Scaramelli
- 9 (Croatia) Ivan Vida

Line Players

- 20 (Greece) Chrysanthos Tsanaxidis
- 28 (Greece) Vasileios Manthos
- 66 (Greece) Stefanos Michailidis

Left Backs

- 14 (Argentina) Tomás Cañete
- 19 (Croatia) Ivan Slišković
- 24 (Israel) Lidor Peso
- 32 (Greece) Nikos Passias
- 77 (Greece) Savvas Savvas

Central Backs

- 17 (Greece) Petros Kandylas
- 31 (Brazil) Denys Barros

Right Backs

- 5 (Slovenia) Grega Krečič
- 11 (Greece) Thanasis Papazoglou

=== Technical staff ===
- Head coach: (Italy) Riccardo Trillini
- Assistant coach: (Italy) Sergio Palazzi
- Goalkeeper trainer: (Italy) Luigi Malavasi
- Team manager: (Greece) Costas Karabourniotis
- Physiotherapist: (Greece) Dionysis Tyrogalas

=== Transfers ===
Transfers for the 2026–27 season

Joining

- (Egypt) Karim Handawy (GK) from (Qatar) Al Duhail SC
- (Germany) David Schmidt (RB) from (Germany) Frisch Auf Göppingen
- (Romania) (Croatia) Ante Kuduz (LB) from (France) Dijon Métropole Handball

Leaving

- (Portugal) Diogo Valério (GK) to (Poland) KPR Ostrovia Ostrów Wielkopolski
- (Greece) Savvas Savvas (LB) to (Germany) HSC 2000 Coburg
- (Greece) Chrysanthos Tsanaxidis (LP) to (Austria) Jags Vöslau

=== Transfer History ===
Transfers for the 2025–26 season

Joining

- (Portugal) Diogo Valério (GK) from (Portugal) Maritimo Madeira Andebol
- (Chile) Luciano Scaramelli (RW) from (Italy) Pallamano Conversano
- (Argentina) Tomás Cañete (LB) from (Italy) SSV Brixen Handball
- (Greece) Vasileios Manthos (LP) from (Greece) AC Diomidis Argous
- (Poland) Cezary Surgiel (LW) from (Poland) Industria Kielce
- (Greece) Chrysanthos Tsanaxidis
- (Israel) Lidor Peso
- (Brazil) Denys Barros
- (Slovenia) Grega Krečič

Leaving

- (Bosnia and Herzegovina) Josip Peric (CB) to (Switzerland) Kadetten Schaffhausen
- (Greece) Konstantinos Kotanidis (GK) to (Spain) CB Caserío Ciudad Real
- (Greece) Dimitris Tziras
- (Greece) Giorgos Papavassilis
- (Greece) Nikolas Liapis
- (Montenegro) Luka Vujovic
- (Serbia) Predrag Vejin

Transfers for the 2023–24 season

Joining

- (Greece) Savvas Savvas (LB) from (Germany) ASV Hamm-Westfalen
- (Greece) Panagiotis Papantonopoulos (GK) from (Spain) CB Ademar León
- (Greece) Grigorios Tzimpoulas (LW) from (Greece) AC Diomidis Argous
- (Greece) Christos Tsigaridas (CB) from (Greece) AC Diomidis Argous
- (Greece) Dimitrios Tziras (RW) from (Greece) A.C. Doukas
- (Slovenia) Miha Kavčič (LP) from (Switzerland) HSC Kreuzlingen

Leaving

- (Greece) Vyron Papadopoulos (LW) to (Greece) AEK Athens
- (Greece) Garyfalos Bagios (RW) to (Greece) AC Diomidis Argous
- (Greece) Taxiarchis Papadimitriou (GK)
- (Austria) Thomas Bauer (GK) to (Austria) Jags Vöslau
- (Netherlands) Florent Bourget (CB) to (Belgium) HC Visé BM
- (Ukraine) Vladyslav Ostroushko (LB) to (Poland) KS Azoty-Puławy
- (France) (Democratic Republic of the Congo) Olivier Nyokas (LB)

== Previous squads ==
2024–2025 Team
Shirt No	Nationality	Player	Birth Date	Position
1	Greece	Costas Kotanidis	7 February 1992 (age 34)	Goalkeeper
6	Greece	Dimitris Tziras	5 April 1991 (age 35)	Right Winger
8	Greece	Giorgos Papavasilis	31 July 2000 (age 26)	Left Winger
9	Croatia	Ivan Vida	14 March 1995 (age 31)	Right Winger
10	Greece	Grigoris Tzimpoulas	23 January 2001 (age 25)	Left Winger
11	Greece	Thanasis Papazoglou	28 January 2002 (age 24)	Right Back
12	Greece	Panagiotis Papantonopoulos	2 October 2001 (age 25)	Goalkeeper
17	Greece	Petros Kandylas	28 February 1991 (age 35)	Central Back
18	Croatia	Josip Perić	5 June 1992 (age 34)	Central back
19	Croatia	Ivan Slišković	23 October 1991 (age 35)	Left Back
22	Montenegro	Luka Vujovic	11 April 2000 (age 26)	Line Player
23	Croatia	Predrag Vejin	17 December 1992 (age 33)	Right Back
27	Greece	Nikolas Liapis	24 August 1999 (age 27)	Line Player
32	Greece	Nikolaos Passias	17 February 1995 (age 31)	Left Back
66	Greece	Stefanos Michailidis	15 May 1994 (age 32)	Line Player
77	Greece	Savvas Savvas	7 July 1997 (age 29)	Left Back
88	Greece	Filippos Nikolidais	31 January 2003 (age 23)	Goalkeeper

2023–2024 Team
Shirt No	Nationality	Player	Birth Date	Position
1	Greece	Konstantinos Kotanidis	7 February 1992 (age 34)	Goalkeeper
6	Greece	Dimitrios Tziras	5 April 1991 (age 35)	Right Winger
7	Greece	Panagiotis Karampourniotis	20 February 1998 (age 28)	Line Player
8	Greece	Georgios Papavasilis	31 July 2000 (age 26)	Left Winger
9	Croatia	Ivan Vida	14 March 1995 (age 31)	Right Winger
10	Greece	Grigorios Tzimpoulas	23 January 2001 (age 25)	Left Winger
11	Greece	Petros Vamvakaris	15 October 2004 (age 22)	Central Back
12	Greece	Panagiotis Papantonopoulos	2 October 2001 (age 25)	Goalkeeper
17	Greece	Petros Kandylas	28 February 1991 (age 35)	Central Back
19	Croatia	Ivan Slišković	23 October 1991 (age 35)	Left Back
23	Greece	Charalampos Dompris	23 July 1994 (age 32)	Central Back
24	Greece	Christos Tsigaridas	13 September 2000 (age 26)	Central Back
32	Greece	Nikolaos Passias	17 February 1995 (age 31)	Left Back
33	Spain	Ángel Montoro	10 April 1989 (age 37)	Right Back
44	Serbia	Savo Slavuljica	13 August 1998 (age 28)	Right Back
45	Slovenia	Miha Kavčič	19 June 1998 (age 28)	Line Player
66	Greece	Stefanos Michailidis	15 May 1994 (age 32)	Line Player
77	Greece	Savvas Savvas	7 July 1997 (age 29)	Left Back

2022–2023 Team
Shirt No	Nationality	Player	Birth Date	Position
1	Greece	Konstantinos Kotanidis	7 February 1992 (age 34)	Goalkeeper
3	Greece	Michail Rousos	23 April 2004 (age 22)	Right Winger
4	Greece	Triantafyllos Prokopiou	24 June 2005 (age 21)	Line Player
6	FranceDemocratic Republic of the Congo	Olivier Nyokas	28 June 1986 (age 40)	Left Back
7	Greece	Panagiotis Karampourniotis	20 February 1998 (age 28)	Line Player
8	Greece	Georgios Papavasilis	31 July 2000 (age 26)	Left Winger
10	Greece	Konstantinos Koutoulogenis	1 November 2004 (age 22)	Line Player
16	Greece	Taxiarchis Papadimitriou	4 June 1998 (age 28)	Goalkeeper
17	Greece	Petros Kandylas	28 February 1991 (age 35)	Central Back
20	Greece	Garyfalos Bagios	26 April 1994 (age 32)	Right Winger
22	Greece	Vyron Papadopoulos	22 February 1986 (age 40)	Left Winger
23	Greece	Charalampos Dompris	23 July 1994 (age 32)	Central Back
25	Netherlands	Florent Bourget	12 June 1998 (age 28)	Central Back
30	Austria	Robert Weber	25 November 1985 (age 40)	Right Winger
32	Greece	Nikolaos Passias	17 February 1995 (age 31)	Left Back
33	Spain	Ángel Montoro	10 April 1989 (age 37)	Right Back
39	Greece	Vasilis Liolios	13 May 1999 (age 27)	Central Back
44	Serbia	Savo Slavuljica	13 August 1998 (age 28)	Right Back
55	Ukraine	Vladyslav Ostroushko	5 March 1986 (age 40)	Left Back
59	Bosnia and Herzegovina	Elmir Građan	28 December 1993 (age 32)	Line Player
66	Greece	Stefanos Michailidis	15 May 1994 (age 32)	Line Player
99	Austria	Thomas Bauer	24 January 1986 (age 40)	Goalkeeper

2018–2019 Team
Shirt No	Nationality	Player	Birth Date	Position
4	Greece	Nikolaos Kritikos	24 September 1996 (age 30)	Left Back
6	Greece	Dimitrios Tziras	5 April 1991 (age 35)	Right Winger
7	Greece	Panagiotis Karampourniotis	20 February 1998 (age 28)	Line Player
8	Brazil	Patrick Lemos	23 May 1996 (age 30)	Central Back
11	Spain	Luis Felipe Jiménez Reina	12 June 1989 (age 37)	Right Back
12	Poland	Marko Terlecki	8 May 2000 (age 26)	Goalkeeper
14	Greece	Panagiotis Stoumpis	15 June 1991 (age 35)	Left Winger
15	Greece	Stylianos Asvestas	21 March 1999 (age 27)	Right Back
16	Greece	Argyris Papadopoulos-Vellis	10 February 1998 (age 28)	Goalkeeper
17	Greece	Petros Kandylas	28 February 1991 (age 35)	Central Back
18	Greece	Grigorios Sanikis	29 January 1980 (age 46)	Left Back
23	Bosnia and Herzegovina	Petar Bubalo	1 August 1992 (age 34)	Right Back
24	Greece	Antonios Kontis	7 October 1991 (age 35)	Left Winger
27	Greece	Nikolaos Liapis	24 August 1999 (age 27)	Line Player
31	Greece	Konstantinos Tsilimparis	31 July 1979 (age 47)	Goalkeeper
32	Serbia	Igor Arsić	19 October 1989 (age 37)	Goalkeeper
33	Greece	Andreas Arapakopoulos	15 November 1994 (age 31)	Line Player
50	Greece	Theodoros Delichristos	17 June 2000 (age 26)	Central Back
77	Greece	Angelos Tsilis	6 November 1992 (age 34)	Left Winger

== Honours ==
=== European Competitions ===
- EHF European Cup
  - Runners-up (1): 2023–24

=== Domestic Competitions ===
- Greek Championship

Winners (6): 2017–18, 2018–19, 2021–22, 2023–24, 2024–25, 2025–26

- Greek Cup

Winners (5): 2017–18, 2018–19, 2022–23, 2025–26

- Greek Super Cup

Winners (5) (record): 2022, 2023, 2024, 2025, 2026

=== Individual club awards ===
- Double
  - Winners (3): 2017–18, 2018–19, 2025-26

== European record ==
Season	Competition	Round	Club	1st leg	2nd leg	Aggregate
2017–18	EHF Cup	R1	(Czech Republic) Talent Plzeň	**21–21 (A)**	17–29 (H)	38–50 ^{[a]}
2018–19	EHF Cup	R2	(Hungary) Sport36-Komló	**29–34 (A)**	27–22 (H)	56–56 ^{[b]}
2018–19	EHF Cup	R3	(Croatia) RK Nexe	22–25 (H)	**25–30 (A)**	47–55
2019–20	EHF Cup	R1	(Bosnia and Herzegovina) RK Borac m:tel	30–21 (H)	**30–25 (A)**	60–46
2019–20	EHF Cup	R2	(Romania) SCM Politehnica Timișoara	**29–31 (A)**	29–26 (H)	58–57
2019–20	EHF Cup	R3	(Germany) MT Melsungen	**28–32** (A)	19–20 (H)	47–52
2022–23	EHF European Cup	R2	(Bosnia and Herzegovina) RK Sloboda Tuzla	34–24 (H)	**27–19 (A)**	61–43
2022–23	EHF European Cup	R3	(Switzerland) Wacker Thun	**22–24 (A)**	19–24 (H)	41–48
2023–24	EHF European Cup	R2	(Italy) Raimond Sassari	**31–24 (A)**	38–29 (H)	69–53
2023–24	EHF European Cup	R3	(Croatia) MRK Trogir	**27–26 (A)**	36–28 (H)	63–54
2023–24	EHF European Cup	Last 16	(Italy) SV Brixen Handball	**29–23 (A)**	37–25 (H)	66–48
2023–24	EHF European Cup	Quarterfinals	(Slovenia) MRK Krka	31–26 (H)	**25–19 (A)**	56–45
2023–24	EHF European Cup	Semifinals	(Hungary) Ferencvárosi TC	**28–28 (A)**	39–32 (H)	67–60
2023–24	EHF European Cup	Final	(Iceland) Valur Reykjavík	**26–30 (A)**	31–27 (H)	57–57, 4–5 (p)
2024–25	EHF European Cup	R2	(Australia) Fivers Margareten	30–21 (H)	**29–35 (A)**	59–56
2024–25	EHF European Cup	R3	(Romania) Potaissa Turda	**32–27 (A)**	27–31 (H)	59–58
2024–25	EHF European Cup	Last 16	(Norway) Drammen HK	**36–35 (A)**	34–30 (H)	70–65
2024–25	EHF European Cup	Quarterfinals	(Norway) Runar Sandefjord	37–31 (H)	**23–33 (A)**	60–64
2025–26	EHF European Cup	R2	(Italy) Albatro Siracusa	**34–28 (A)**	38–25 (H)	72–53 ^{[c]}
2025–26	EHF European Cup	R3	(Italy) Cassano Magnago HC	25–20 (H)	**29–26 (A)**	54–46
2025–26	EHF European Cup	Last 16	(Finland) BK-46	39–30 (H)	**31–25 (A)**	70–55
2025–26	EHF European Cup	Quarterfinals	(North Macedonia) GRK Ohrid	26–31 (H)	**24–25 (A)**	50–56
2026–27	EHF European Cup	R2	(Poland) Netland MKS Kalisz	30–24 (H)	**25–21 (A)**	55–45
2026–27	EHF European Cup	R3	(Bosnia and Herzegovina) RK Sloga Doboj	– (H)	**– (A)**	–

Notes

- Olympiacos is always mentioned first in the score.
- H: Home / **A: Away (in bold)**

a Both legs were hosted by Talent Plzeň.
b Olympiacos qualified on away goals.
c Both legs were hosted by Olympiacos.

== Former club members ==
=== Notable former players ===
- (Greece) Alexandros Alvanos (2017–2018)
- (Greece) Charalampos Mallios (2019–2020)
- (Greece) Vyron Papadopoulos (2021–2023)
- (Greece) Grigorios Sanikis (2017–2020)
- (Greece) Savvas Savvas (2023–)
- (Greece) Konstantinos Tsilimparis (2017–2020)
- (Austria) Thomas Bauer (2021-2023)
- (Austria) Robert Weber (2022–2023)
- (Belarus) Artur Karvatski (2019–2020)
- (Croatia) Goran Bogunović (2019–2020)
- (Croatia) Ivan Slišković (2023–)
- (Croatia) Ivan Vida (2023–)
- (Montenegro) Božidar Leković (2014–2015)
- (Montenegro) Bogdan Petričević (2017–2018)
- (Netherlands) Florent Bourget (2023)
- (Spain) Ángel Montoro (2021–)
- (Ukraine) Vladyslav Ostroushko (2021–2023)
