= Kosuke Yasuhira =

Japanese handball player

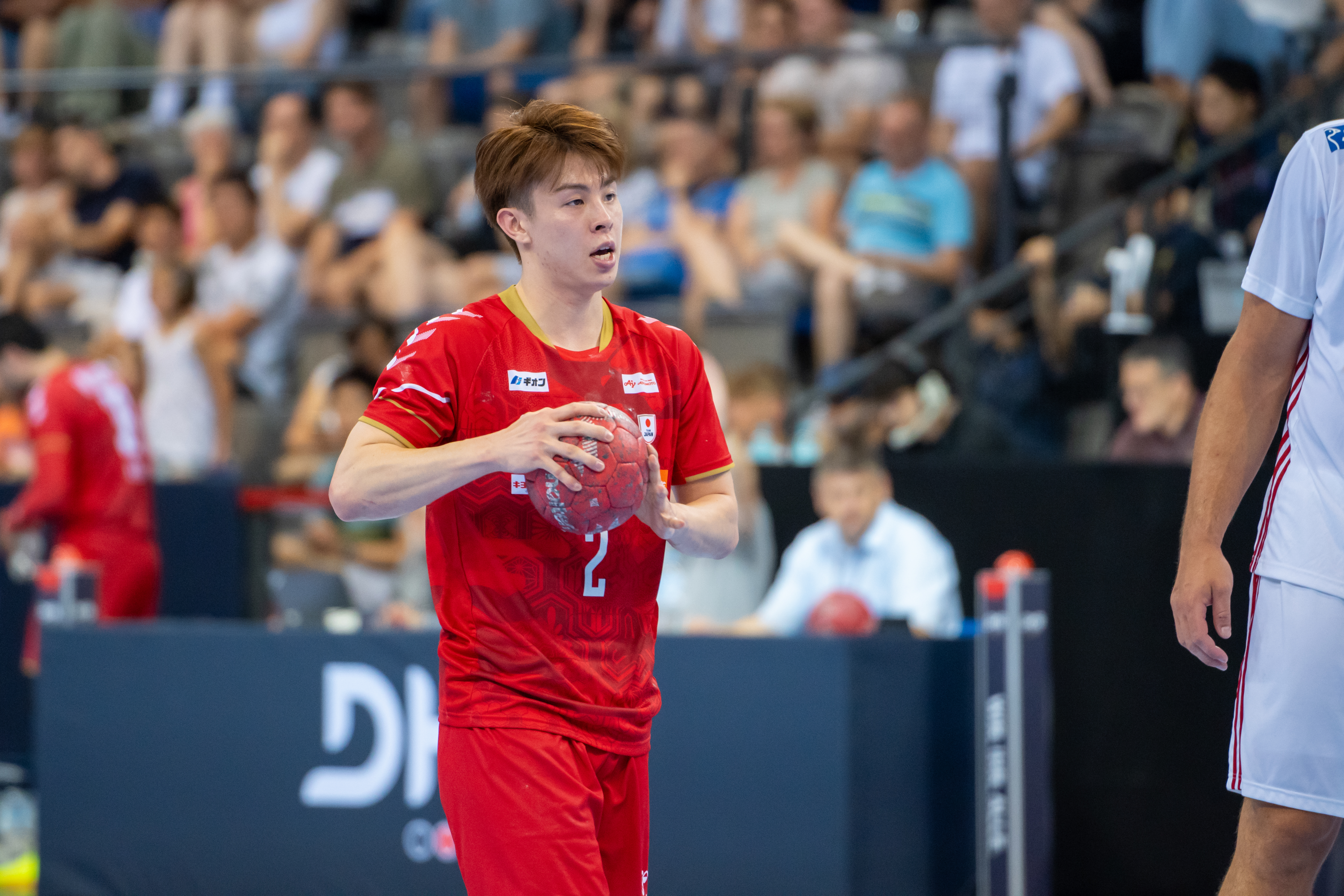

Personal information
- Nationality: Japanese
- Born: June 29, 2000 (age 26) Himi, Toyama, Japan
- Height: 1.72 m (5 ft 8 in)

Sport
- Sport: Handball
- Position: Centre back
- Current club: Burgan SC
- Number: 13

Senior clubs
- Years: Team
- 2021–2022: USAM Nîmes Gard
- 2022–2024: Wisła Płock
- 2023–2024: → RK Vardar 1961 (loan)
- 2023: → Al-Qadsia SC (loan)
- 2024–: Burgan SC
- 2025: → Al Arabi (loan)
- 2026: → GRK Ohrid (loan)
National team
- Years: Team
- 2018: Japan U21
- 2018–2019: Japan U19
- 2022–: Japan

Kosuke Yasuhira (Japanese: 安平 光佑, Yasuhira Kōsuke; born 29 June 2000) is a Japanese professional handballer who plays as a centre back for Kuwaiti club Burgan SC and Japan national team.

He is known for his speed, vision, playmaking ability, and creativity, earning nicknames such as "Sonic" and "Samurai" during his time with RK Vardar in North Macedonia.

== Early life and education ==
Yasuhira was born in Himi, Toyama Prefecture, a region known for its strong handball culture. He attended Himi City Nishijo Junior High School and Himi High School, where he contributed to a rare high school triple crown: winning the National High School Handball Selection Tournament (Senbatsu), the Inter-High School Athletic Meeting, and the National Sports Festival handball competition during his senior year.

After high school, he enrolled at Nippon Sport Science University but dropped out to pursue a professional career abroad. His brother also played handball, which influenced his start in the sport.

== Club career ==
In 2020, during his first year at university, Yasuhira traveled to Germany and joined the THW Kiel U-23 team.

=== USAM Nîmes Gard: 2021–2022 ===
Following his time in Germany, Yasuhira signed his first professional contract with French club USAM Nîmes Gard in the Starligue (LNH Division 1). In the 2021–22 season, he made 19 appearances and scored 23 goals.

=== Orlen Wisła Płock: 2022–2024 ===
In August 2022, he joined Polish top club Wisła Płock. During the 2022–23 season, Yasuhira made history by becoming the first Japanese male player to score a goal in the EHF Champions League. He contributed in both domestic and European competitions, scoring 39 goals in 26 Polish league matches.

=== RK Vardar 1961: 2023–2024 ===
For the 2023–24 season, he was loaned to Macedonian giants RK Vardar 1961. Wearing number 13, Yasuhira became a fan favourite and earned the nickname "Samurai" for his tenacity and skill. His performances in the Macedonian league and European competitions further boosted his reputation as a creative playmaker.

=== Burgan SC: 2024–present ===
In summer 2024, Yasuhira joined Burgan SC on a permanent transfer after the Kuwaiti Handball Premier League club acquired his remaining contractual rights from Wisła Płock. He quickly established himself as a key player in the Asian competitive scene.

In June 2026, he was instrumental in Burgan SC winning their first Asian Men's Club League Handball Championship. Yasuhira's standout performances throughout the tournament earned him the MVP award.

== International career ==
In July 2018, he represented Japan at the U-22 East Asian Championship, where the team finished as runners-up. Later that year, he competed at the 2018 Asian Men's Youth Handball Championship with the Japan U-19 national team, again finishing as runners-up. In the next year, he represented them at the 2019 Men's Youth World Handball Championship, where the team finished ninth.

He received his first call-up to the senior Japan national team in December 2022 and made his international debut on 6 January 2023 against Switzerland at the Yellow Cup in Winterthur, scoring four goals. In October 2023, he played a key role in helping Japan qualify for the 2024 Summer Olympics, securing the nation's first Olympic berth through the Asian qualifiers in 36 years. In April 2024, he was awarded the Abe Prize by the city of Himi. Despite the team's early exit at the olympics, he recorded 30 goals and 26 assists in five appearances. His 26 assists were the highest total among all players during the preliminary round.
