= GRK Ohrid =

Handball club in North Macedonia

GRK Ohrid (North Macedonia)
- Full name: Gradski Rakometen klub Ohrid
- Nickname: Gladiators
- Founded: 1972; 54 years ago
- Arena: Sportska Sala Biljanini Izvori, Ohrid
- Capacity: 2,400
- President: Risto Kitevski
- Head coach: Boris Rojević
- League: Macedonian Super League; Regional League
- 2025–26: Macedonian Super League, 3rd
- Club colours
Home	Away

GRK Ohrid (Macedonian: ГРК Охрид) is a handball club from Ohrid, North Macedonia. They compete in the domestic Macedonian Super League and the Regional League.

Location of GRK Ohrid

== History ==
Elektromontazha shortly EMO Ohrid was established in 1972 and for the last 30 years has been a leading Macedonian manufacturer and supplier of electro-mechanical components and systems, with design, manufacturing and installation capability.

The company had established its own Handball Club Elektromontazha Ohrid. It was one of the top clubs in the 70s and early 80s. They had won three championships back in 1977, 1978 and 1983. The club had decreased in the 90s due to the companies financial crises. It stopped working in the early 2000s. GRK Ohrid was founded in 2011 in Ohrid as a successor of HC Elektromontazha by local handball players, coaches and sports professionals with the aim of reviving handball in the city of Ohrid. In the first two seasons, they competed in the First Macedonian Handball League. The club first played in the Macedonian Handball Super League in the 2013/14 season as RK Ohrid 2013, and in its first season, finished seventh in the regular season and second in the playoffs. In the 2016/17 season, the club won first place in the regular season of the Macedonian Handball Super League, and in the playoffs they finished third behind Vardar and Metalurg, thus securing their first participation in a European Cup. In the 2017/18 season, RK Ohrid 2013 participated in the EHF Cup for the first time. Since 2018, the club's name has been GRK Ohrid.

== Supporters ==
GRK Ohrid supporters are called Ribari, which means Fishermen.

== Accomplishments ==
=== Macedonian Handball Super League ===
- Macedonian Champions

:1977, 1978, 1983

=== European Competitions ===
- EHF European Cup

Winner (1): 2025-26

== Crest, colours, supporters ==
=== Kits ===
HOME
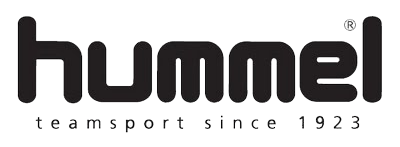
2022–23

AWAY
2022–23	2023-24

== Home Ground ==
The Biljanini Izvori Sports Arena is a multi-functional indoor sports arena. It is located in Ohrid, North Macedonia. The sports hall was inaugurated in August 1998 and has a capacity of 2,400 seats for handball and 4,500 for basketball. It is used by several handball and basketball teams from Ohrid. It was one of two venues of the 2008 European Women's Handball Championship .

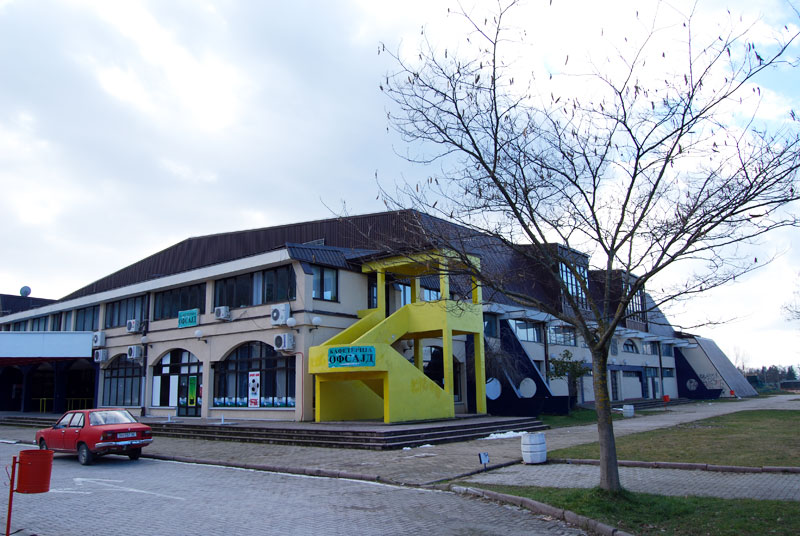
Home hall: Sportska Sala Biljanini Izvori

- Name: – Sportska Sala Biljanini Izvori
- City: – Ohrid
- Capacity: – 2,400
- Address: – 6000, Bull Tourist bb.

== European record (European Union) ==
In the first two seasons, they competed in the First Macedonian Handball League. The 2013–14 season was their first season in Macedonian Handball Super League, when they finished in eighth position. Their first qualification in Play-off phase was season 2015–16, when they finished second in Regular season and fifth in play-off. Season after that they were placed third at the end, so they qualified for the 2017–18 EHF Cup qualification. After the end of the 2023/24 season, GRK Ohrid again qualified to play for the next season in one of the European Cups, by finishing fourth. In the 2024/25 season, it started from the second round of the EHF European Cup, where the opponent was the team of Potaisa Turda from Romania.

=== EHF Cup ===
Season	Round	Club	Home	Away	Aggregate
2017-18	R1	(Netherlands) KRAS/Volendam	24–24	24–23	48–47
2017-18	R2	(Portugal) FC Porto	20–37	26–44	44–81

=== European Cup ===
Season	Round	Club	Home	Away	Aggregate
2024-25	R2	(Romania) AHC Potaissa Turda	31–25	29–39	60–64
2025–26; Winners	R2	(Azerbaijan) HC Baku	44–11	38–21	82–32
2025–26; Winners	R3	(Bosnia and Herzegovina) RK Sloga Doboj	37–19	42–18	79–37
2025–26; Winners	Last 16	(Czech Republic) HC Dukla Prague	30–21	30–24	60–45
2025–26; Winners	1/4	(Greece) Olympiacos SFP	25–24	31–26	56–50
2025–26; Winners	Semi Final	(Slovenia) RK Celje	29-27	26-27	55-54
2025–26; Winners	Final	(Hungary) MOL Tatabánya KC	31-25	29-28	60-53

== Team ==
=== Current squad ===
Squad for the 2026–2027 season
Goalkeepers

- 12 (Croatia) Dino Slavić
- 30 (North Macedonia) Bojan Blazheski
- 93 (North Macedonia) Daniel Gjorgjeski

Left Wingers

- 3 (North Macedonia) Goce Ojleski
- 9 (France) Adama Keïta
- 17 (North Macedonia) Nikola Risteski

Right Wingers

- 45 (Serbia) Darko Đukić
- 77 (North Macedonia) Alen Kjosevski

Line Players

- 5 (Japan) Shuichi Yoshida
- 19 (North Macedonia) Ivan Taseski
- 27 (Greece) Nikolaos Liapis

Left Backs

- 6 (Croatia) Ante Ivanković
- 14 (North Macedonia) Ilija Trajcheski
- 31 (Serbia) Nikola Zečević

Central Backs

- 2 (Slovenia) Tilen Strmljan
- 11 (North Macedonia) Martin Karapalevski
- 13 (North Macedonia) Tane Jancheski
- 34 (North Macedonia) Martin Ivanovski

Right Backs

- 4 (North Macedonia) Tomislav Jagurinovski
- 21 (North Macedonia) David Savrevski
- 23 (Hungary) Dominik Máthé

=== Technical staff ===
- Head coach: (Serbia) Boris Rojević
- Assistant coach: (North Macedonia) Naum Babachev
- Assistant coach: (North Macedonia) Krste Andonovski
- Goalkeeping coach: (North Macedonia) Zoran Georgieski
- Fitness coach: (Serbia) Andrija Njaradi
- Physiotherapist: (North Macedonia) Ljupcho Atanasov
- Physiotherapist: (North Macedonia) Dimitar Spiroski

=== Transfers ===
Transfers for the 2027–28 season

Joining

- (Slovenia) Uroš Milićević (LB) (from (Slovenia) RK Celje) ?
- (Japan) Kosuke Yasuhira (CB) (from (Kuwait) Burgan SC)

Leaving

- (Croatia) Ante Ivanković (LB) (to (Croatia) RK Nexe Našice) ?

Transfer History

Transfers for the 2026–27 season

Joining

- (Croatia) Dino Slavić (GK) from (France) Limoges Handball
- (Hungary) Dominik Máthé (RB) from (Norway) Elverum Håndball
- (Japan) Shuichi Yoshida (LP) from (France) HBC Nantes
- (Serbia) Nikola Zečević (LB) from (Serbia) RK Partizan
- (France) Adama Keïta (LW) from (Greece) AEK Athens
- (North Macedonia) Filip Taleski (LB) from (Hungary) MOL Tatabánya KC
- (North Macedonia) Martin Ivanovski (CB) from (North Macedonia) RK Alkaloid
- (North Macedonia) Martin Karapalevski (CB) from (Spain) BM Atlético Valladolid
- (North Macedonia) Nikola Šipinkoski (RB) (back from loan (North Macedonia) RK Prilep 2010)

Leaving

- (North Macedonia) Filip Taleski (LB) to (Switzerland) HSC Suhr Aarau
- (Montenegro) Vuko Borozan (LB) to (North Macedonia) RK Alkaloid
- (Croatia) Kristian Pilipović (GK) to (Switzerland) HC Kriens-Luzern
- (Croatia) Gianfranco Pribetić (LP) to (Belarus) HC Meshkov Brest
- (Serbia) Predrag Vejin (RB) to (Israel) Maccabi Tel Aviv
- (Georgia (country)) Teimuraz Orjonikidze (LB) to (Romania) AHC Potaissa Turda
- (Spain) Oriol Rey Morales (LP) to (Poland) Wisła Płock
- (North Macedonia) Dejan Kukulovski (LB) to (Serbia) RK Metaloplastika
- (North Macedonia) Nikola Shipinkoski (RB) to (North Macedonia) RK Prilep 2010
- (Serbia) Stefan Petrić (LB) (to ?)
- (Japan) Kosuke Yasuhira (CB) (end of loan (Kuwait) Burgan SC)
- (Croatia) Lovro Jotić (CB) (to (Romania) CSA Steaua București)
- (Serbia) Vladimir Bojanić (P) (to (North Macedonia) RK Mladost 1977)

Transfers for the 2025–26 season

Joining

- (Greece) Nikolaos Liapis (LP) from (Greece) Olympiacos
- (Serbia) Predrag Vejin (RB) from (Greece) Olympiacos
- (Serbia) Darko Đukić (RW) from (Romania) Dinamo București
- (North Macedonia) Alen Kjosevski (RW) from (North Macedonia) RK Vardar
- (Serbia) Stefan Petrić (LB) from (North Macedonia) RK Vardar
- (Croatia) Ante Ivanković (LB) from (Germany) TVB Stuttgart
- (Slovenia) Tilen Strmljan (CB) from (Germany) TSV Hannover-Burgdorf
- (Spain) Oriol Rey Morales (LP) from (Spain) BM Granollers
- (North Macedonia) David Savrevski (RB) from (North Macedonia) RK Alkaloid
- (North Macedonia) Bojan Blažeski (GK) from (North Macedonia) HC Butel Skopje
- (North Macedonia) Nikola Šipinkoski (RB) return from a loan at (North Macedonia) RK Prilep 2010
- (Croatia) Kristian Pilipović (GK) from (Switzerland) Kadetten Schaffhausen
- (Croatia) Gianfranco Pribetić (LP) from (Germany) TVB Stuttgart
- (Serbia) Mladen Krsmančić (CB) from (North Macedonia) RK Vardar
- (Montenegro) Vuko Borozan (LB) from (North Macedonia) RK Vardar
- (Japan) Kosuke Yasuhira (CB) (on loan from (Kuwait) Burgan SC)

Leaving

- (Croatia) Nikola Jukić (RB) to (Saudi Arabia) Mudhar Club
- (Croatia) Rudolf Šafranko (CB) to (Austria) UHC Hollabrunn
- (Slovenia) Gal Cirar (RW) to (Austria) UHC Hollabrunn
- (North Macedonia) Naum Kostov (RW) to (North Macedonia) RK Struga
- (North Macedonia) Boban Ristevski (GK) to ?
- (North Macedonia) Gradimir Chanevski (GK) to (North Macedonia) HC Butel Skopje
- (North Macedonia) Krste Andonoski (LW) (retires)
- (North Macedonia) Milorad Kukoski (LB) (retires)
- (Japan) Hiroki Matsuoka (CB) to (Japan) Osaki Osol HC
- (North Macedonia) Goran Krstevski (CB) to (Israel) Ness Ziona Handball
- (Serbia) Mladen Krsmančić (CB) to (Serbia) RK Vojvodina
- (Brazil) Caio Vinícius de Souza Morais (RB) to (Israel) Handball Club Holon
- (North Macedonia) Nikola Šipinkoski (RB) on loan at (North Macedonia) RK Prilep 2010
- (Serbia) Živan Pešić (P) to (Croatia) RK Nexe Našice

== Retired numbers ==
GRK Ohrid retired numbers
N°	Nationality	Player	Position	Tenure
97	(North Macedonia)	Nikola Danilovski	Goalkeeper	2019–2021

== Former club members ==
=== Notable former players ===
==== Goalkeepers ====
- (North Macedonia) Gradimir Chanevski (2024–2025)
- (North Macedonia) Nikola Danilovski (2019–2021)
- (North Macedonia) Kiril Kolev (2014–2016, 2018)
- (North Macedonia) Blagojče Trajkovski (2016–2018)
- (Bosnia and Herzegovina) Berin Brkić (2023–2024)
- (Croatia) Kristian Pilipović (2025–2026)
- (Croatia) Dino Slavić (2026–)
- (Montenegro) Jagoš Braunović (2018–2022)

==== Right wingers ====
- (Serbia) Darko Đukić (2025–)

==== Left wingers ====
- (North Macedonia) Goce Ojleski (2023–)
- (North Macedonia) Krste Andonovski (2012–2025)

==== Line players ====
- (Montenegro) Admir Pelidija (2023–2024)
- (Croatia) Gianfranco Pribetić (2025–2026)
- (Greece) Nikolaos Liapis (2025–)
- (Japan) Shuichi Yoshida (2026–)
- (Serbia) Živan Pešić (2024–2025)

==== Left backs ====
- (North Macedonia) Milorad Kukoski (2023–2025)
- (North Macedonia) Mihajlo Mladenovikj (2020–2022)
- (Croatia) Ante Ivanković (2025–)
- (Georgia (country)) Teimuraz Orjonikidze (2023–2025)
- (Montenegro) Vuko Borozan (2026)
- (Serbia) Stefan Petrić (2025–2026)
- (Serbia) Nikola Zečević (2026–)

==== Central backs ====
- (North Macedonia) Goran Krstevski (2023–2025)
- (Croatia) Lovro Jotić (2024–2026)
- (Japan) Kosuke Yasuhira (2026–)
- (Slovenia) Tilen Strmljan (2025–)
- (Serbia) Stefan Dodić (2021–2022)
- (Serbia) Mladen Krsmančić (2025)

==== Right backs ====
- (North Macedonia) Tomislav Jagurinovski (2025–)
- (North Macedonia) Milan Levov (2013–2015)
- (North Macedonia) David Savrevski (2025–)
- (Hungary) Dominik Máthé (2026–)
- (Serbia) Predrag Vejin (2025)

== Notable former coaches ==
- (North Macedonia) Goran Andonovski
- (North Macedonia) Radoslav Stojanović
- (North Macedonia) Stevče Aluševski
