= Kjosevski =

Kjosevski is a surname. Notable people with the surname include:

- Alen Kjosevski (born 2001), Macedonian handball player
- Vedran Kjosevski (born 1995), Bosnian footballer
