= Awards of the Montenegrin Olympic Committee =

Sports award in Montenegro

Montenegrin Olympic Committee Awards
- Native name: Nagrade Crnogorskog olimpijskog komiteta
- Description: Honoring the most successful athletes in Olympic sports
- Country: Montenegro
- Presented by: Montenegrin Olympic Committee (COK)
- Website: www.cok.me

Awards of the Montenegrin Olympic Committee (Montenegrin: Nagrade Crnogorskog olimpijskog komiteta) are proclaimed since 1999, at the end of each calendar year, to the most successful athletes. Initially declared Young Male Athlete, Young Female Athlete, Men's Team and Woman's Team, awards for the Sportsman of the Year were introduced in 2011. The competition includes results from current Olympic sports.

== Criteria for Awards ==
Awards are given to the athletes and teams according to their results in Olympic sports and Paralympic sports. The most valuable results are those accomplished in these competitions (in this order):

1. Olympic Games
2. World Championship
3. European Championship
4. World Cup
5. European Cup
6. Paralympic Games

If two sportspersons have identical results, award will go to athletes from individual sports instead of team sports. Exception can be taken if athlete from team sport won MVP award on Olympic Games, World Championship or European Championship. Also worldwide popularity of their sports can be taken into account, as well as maximum number of athletes from individual nation that can participate in competitions. If there are none, exceptional results in single year award will not be presented.

== Sportsperson of the Year ==
This award is proclaimed since the introduction of awards in 2011.

Year	Sportsperson of the Year	Sport
2011	Srđan Mrvaljević	Judo
2012	Bojana Popović; Katarina Bulatović	Handball
2013	Nikola Janović	Water polo
2014	Katarina Bulatović (2); Mlađan Janović	Handball; Water polo
2015	Aleksandar Ivović	Water polo
2016	Aleksandar Ivović (2); Marina Raković	Water polo Karate
2017	Vuko Borozan	Handball
2018	Predrag Radošević	Boxing
2019	Mario Hodžić	Karate
2020	Draško Brguljan	Water polo
2021	Marija Vuković	Athletics
2022	Marija Vuković (2)	Athletics
2023	Nenad Dulović	Karate
2024	Milivoj Dukić	Sailing
2025	Andrea Berišaj	Taekwondo

== Young Male Athlete of the Year ==
This award is introduced in 1999. So far it was awarded to 14 different athletes from 6 sports.

Year	Sportsman of the Year	Sport
1999	Blagota Sekulić	Basketball
2000	Vladimir Gojković	Water polo
2001	Nenad Mijatović	Basketball
2002	Miloš Živković	Karate
2003	Boris Zloković	Water polo
2004	Vjekoslav Pasković	Water polo
2005	Andrija Prlainović	Water polo
2006	Nenad Mijatović	Basketball
2007	Aleksandar Radović	Water polo
2008	Filip Klikovac	Water polo
2009	Darko Brguljan	Water polo
2010	Bojan Kosić	Alpine skiing
2011	Danijel Furtula	Athletics
2012	Milivoj Dukić	Sailing
2013	Arso Milić	Judo
2014	Stefan Pješivac	Water polo
2015	Danilo Pantić	Judo
2016	Đuro Radović	Water polo
2017	Bojan Bošković	Karate
2018	Bojan Bošković (2)	Karate
2019	Bojan Bošković (3)	Karate
2020	Petar Liješević	Boxing
2019	Petar Liješević (2); Miroslav Perković	Boxing; Water polo

== Young Female Athlete of the Year ==
This award is introduced in 1999. So far it was awarded to 14 different athletes from 8 sports.

Year	Sportswoman of the Year	Sport
1999	Bojana Petrović	Handball
2000	Zorica Popović	Alpine skiing
2001	Milica Dabović	Basketball
2002	Jelena Kostić	Judo
2003	Jelena Dubljević	Basketball
2004	Silvija Radović	Volleyball
2005	Silvija Radović (2)	Volleyball
2006	Darija Pop	Swimming
2007	Jovana Kljajević	Athletics
2008	Radmila Miljanić	Handball
2009	Marija Vuković	Athletics
2010	Marija Vuković (2)	Athletics
2011	Danka Kovinić	Tennis
2012	Marina Rajčić	Handball
2013	Kristina Rakočević	Athletics
2014	Ivana Šunjević	Judo
2015	Kristina Rakočević	Athletics
2016	Kristina Rakočević (2)	Athletics
2017	Ivana Nikolić	Judo
2018	Bojana Gojković	Boxing
2019	Bojana Gojković (2)	Boxing
2020	Bojana Gojković (3)	Boxing
2021	Bojana Gojković (4); Milena Jovanović	Boxing; Karate

== Men's Team of the Year ==
This award is introduced in 1999. It was awarded to 13 different teams from 6 different sports.

Year	Men's Team of the Year	Sport
1999	KK Budućnost	Basketball
2000	RK Lovćen Osiguranje	Handball
2001	KK Budućnost (2)	Basketball
2002	OK Budućnost Podgorička Banka	Volleyball
2003	PVK Jadran	Water polo
2004	PVK Jadran (2)	Water polo
2005	PVK Jadran (3)	Water polo
2006	PVK Jadran (4)	Water polo
2007	National water polo team	Water polo
2008	National water polo team (2)	Water polo
2009	VK Primorac	Water polo
2010	National basketball team VK Primorac (2)	Basketball; Water polo
2011	National football team	Football
2012	National water polo team (3)	Water polo
2013	National water polo team (4)	Water polo
2014	National water polo team (5)	Water polo
2015	National water polo team (6)	Water polo
2016	National water polo team (7)	Water polo
2017	National water polo U17 team	Water polo
2018	National water polo team (8)	Water polo
2019	National basketball team (2)	Basketball
2020	National water polo team (9)	Water polo
2021	National water polo team (10)	Water polo

== Women's Team of the Year ==
This award is introduced in 1999. It was awarded to 5 different teams from 3 different sports.

Year	Women's Team of the Year	Sport
1999	ŽRK Budućnost Podgorica	Handball
2000	ŽRK Budućnost Podgorica (2)	Handball
2001	ŽRK Budućnost-Brilliant (3)	Handball
2002	ŽRK Budućnost Monet (4)	Handball
2003	ŽRK Budućnost Monet (5)	Handball
2004	ŽRK Budućnost Monet (6)	Handball
2005	Ženski Karate Klub Budućnost	Karate
2006	ŽRK Budućnost Podgorica (7)	Handball
2007	ŽRK Budućnost Podgorica (8)	Handball
2008	National junior handball team	Handball
2009	National handball team	Handball
2010	National junior handball team (2); ŽRK Budućnost Podgorica (9)	Handball
2011	National basketball team	Basketball
2012	National handball team (2)	Handball
2013	National handball team (3)	Handball
2014	National handball team (4)	Handball
2015	National handball team (5)	Handball
2016	National basketball team (2)	Basketball
2017	National handball team (6)	Handball
2018	National handball team (7)	Handball
2019	National handball team (8)	Handball
2020	National handball team (9)	Handball
2021	National handball team (10)	Handball
