= Ivan Vida =

Croatian handball player (born 1995)

Personal information
- Nationality: Croatian
- Born: 14 March 1995 (age 31) Zagreb, Croatia
- Height: 1.86 m (6 ft 1 in)

Sport
- Sport: Handball
- Position: Right wing
- Current club: Olympiacos Piraeus
- Number: 9

Senior clubs
- Years: Team
- 2014–2018: RK Dubrava
- 2018–2022: RK Nexe Našice
- 2022–2023: Sélestat Alsace
- 2023–: Olympiacos SF Piraeus
National team
Years	Team	Apps	(Gls)
2019–	Croatia	11	(10)

Ivan Vida (born 14 March 1995) is a Croatian handball player for Hellenic club Olympiacos Piraeus and the Croatian national team.

He represented Croatia at the 2019 World Men's Handball Championship.
