= Aleksandar Bakić =

Montenegrin handball player (born 2000)

Personal information
- Nationality: Montenegrin
- Born: 3 September 2000 (age 26) Berane, FR Yugoslavia
- Height: 1.94 m (6 ft 4 in)

Sport
- Sport: Handball
- Position: Left wing
- Current club: RK Nexe
- Number: 4
National team
Years	Team	Apps	(Gls)
2019–	Montenegro	35	(48)

Aleksandar Bakić (born 3 September 2000) is a Montenegrin handball player for RK Nexe and the Montenegrin national team.

He represented Montenegro at the 2020 European Men's Handball Championship.
