= Goran Krstevski =

Macedonian handball player

Personal information
- Nationality: Macedonian
- Born: 29 March 1996 (age 30) Resen, Macedonia
- Height: 1.96 m (6 ft 5 in)

Sport
- Sport: Handball
- Position: Centre back
- Current club: Ness Ziona Handball
- Number: 25

Youth career
- Years: Team
- –: RK Mladost Resen
- 2012–2015: RK Metalurg II

Senior clubs
- Years: Team
- 2015–2017: RK Metalurg Skopje
- 2016–2017: RK Metalurg II
- 2017: → Eurofarm Rabotnik (loan)
- 2017–2019: RK Eurofarm Rabotnik
- 2019–2020: HC Linz AG
- 2020–2023: CSM Focșani
- 2023–2025: GRK Ohrid
- 11/2025–: Ness Ziona Handball
National team
Years	Team	Apps	(Gls)
2018–	North Macedonia	9	(2)

Goran Krstevski (Macedonian: Горан Крстевски) (born 29 March 1996) is a Macedonian handball player for Ness Ziona Handball.

He participated at the 2017 Men's Junior World Handball Championship.
