= Thomas Bauer (handballer) =

Austrian handball player (born 1986)

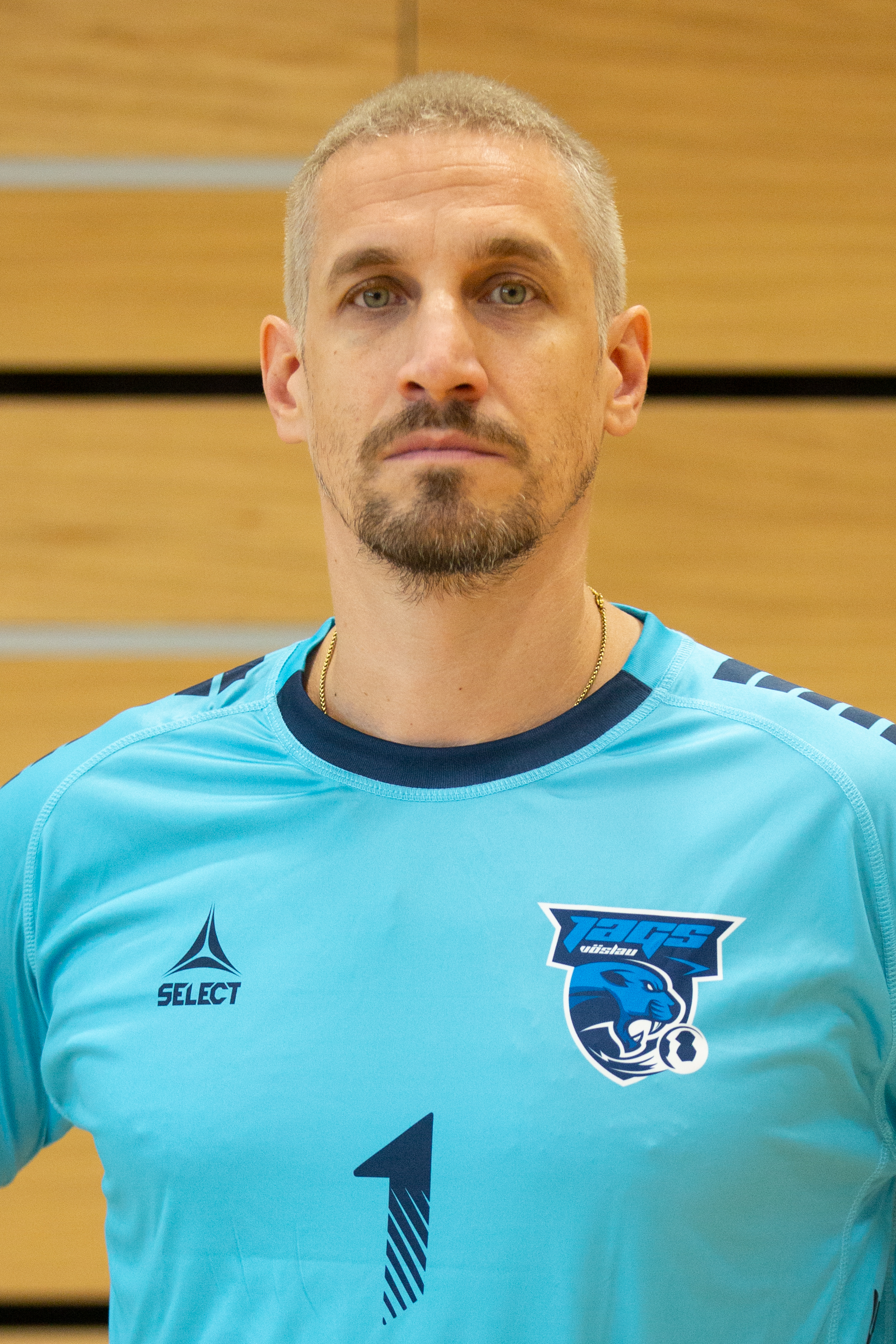
- Bauer (2025)

Personal information
- Nationality: Austrian
- Born: 24 January 1986 (age 40) Vienna, Austria
- Height: 1.90 m (6 ft 3 in)

Sport
- Sport: Handball
- Position: Goalkeeper
- Current club: Olympiacos

Senior clubs
- Years: Team
- 2003–2009: Aon Fivers Margareten
- 2009–2010: TV Korschenbroich
- 2010–2011: HSG Frankfurt Rhein Main
- 2011–2013: TV Neuhausen
- 2013–2015: TBV Lemgo
- 2015–2016: Istres Provence HB
- 2016–2017: Pays d'Aix UC
- 2017–2018: Massy Essonne HB
- 2018: ØIF Arendal
- 2018–2020: FC Porto
- 2020–2021: AEK Athens
- 2021: Al Rayyan
- 2022–: Olympiacos
National team
Years	Team	Apps	(Gls)
2007–	Austria	158	(0)

Thomas Bauer (born 24 January 1986) is an Austrian handball goalkeeper for Greek club Olympiacos and the Austrian national team.

== Honours ==
Aon Fivers Margareten

- Austrian Cup: 2008–09

Porto

- Portuguese League: 2018–19
- Portuguese Cup: 2018–19
- Portuguese Super Cup: 2019

AEK Athens

- Greek Handball Premier: 2020–21
- Greek Cup: 2020–21
- EHF European Cup: 2020–21

Olympiacos

- Greek Handball Premier: 2021–22
