= Goce Ojleski =

Macedonian handball player

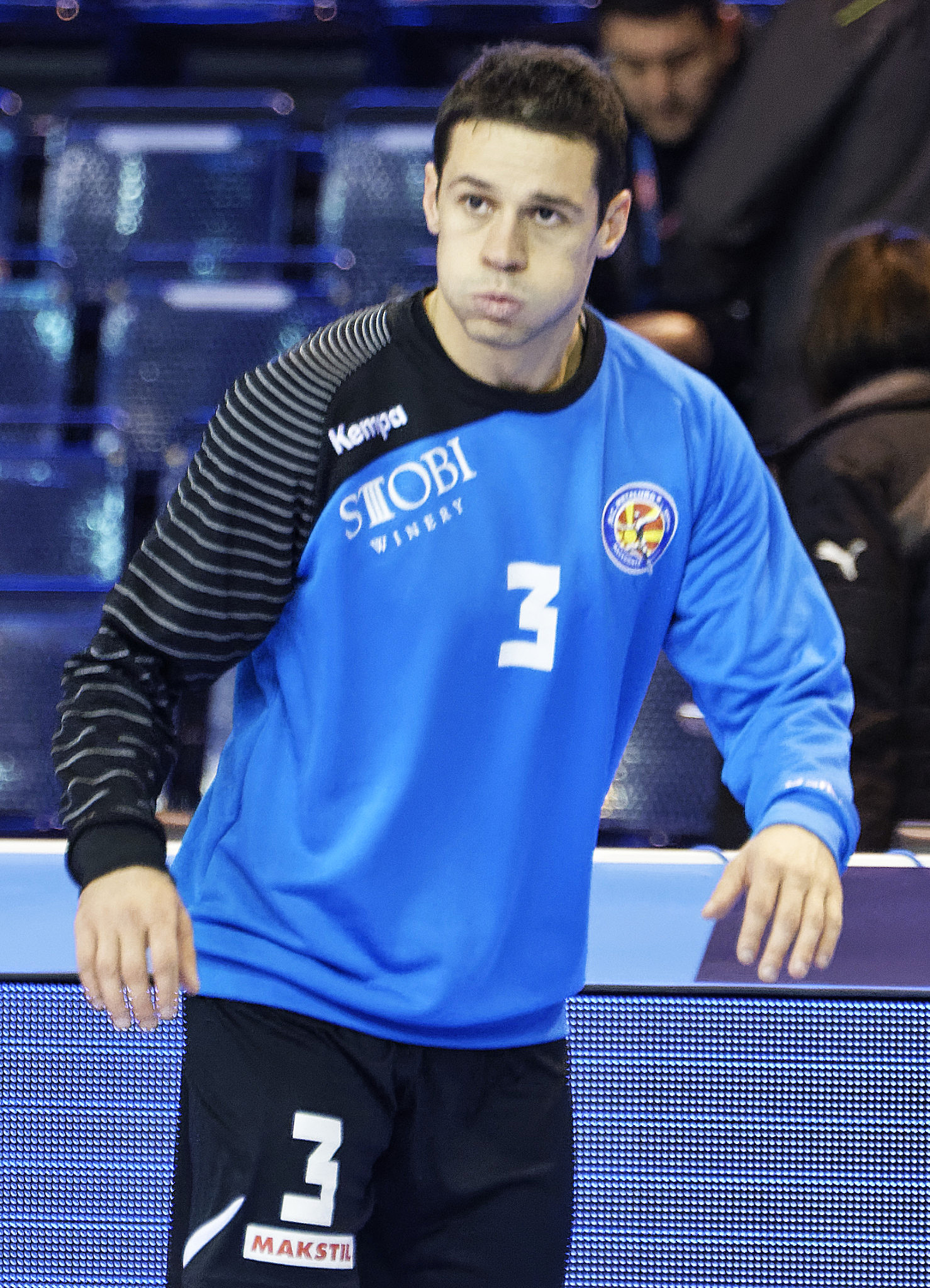

Personal information
- Nationality: Macedonian
- Born: 10 October 1989 (age 37) Struga, Macedonia
- Height: 1.88 m (6 ft 2 in)

Sport
- Sport: Handball
- Position: Left wing
- Current club: GRK Ohrid
- Number: 3

Senior clubs
- Years: Team
- 2008–2013: RK Vardar
- 2013–2015: RK Metalurg Skopje
- 2015–2017: HC Odorheiu Secuiesc
- 2017–2023: RK Eurofarm Pelister
- 2023–: GRK Ohrid
National team
| Years | Team | Apps | (Gls) |
| – | Macedonia | 27 | (21) |

Goce Ojleski (born 10 October 1989) is a Macedonian handball player for GRK Ohrid and the Macedonian national team.

== Honours ==
HC Vardar

- Macedonian Handball Super League

Winner (2):2009,2013

- Macedonian Handball Cup

Winner (1):2012

- SEHA League

Winner (1): 2011–12
HC Metalurg

- Macedonian Handball Super League

Winner (1):2014
HC Pelister

- Macedonian Handball Super League

Winner (1):2023

- EHF EUROPEAN CUP 2026 winner
