= Predrag Radošević =

Montenegrin boxer

Predrag Radošević is a Montenegrin professional boxer and a one-time World Boxing Organization world title challenger.

== World title challenge ==
In 2016, he lost to Liam Smith for the WBO light-middleweight title.

== European success ==
In 2018, he was named Montenegrin Sportsperson of the Year after winning the WBO European title. Radošević lost the European title the following year.

Awards
| Preceded by Vuko Borozan | Montenegrin Sportsperson of the Year; 2018 | Succeeded by Mario Hodžić |
