= Milorad Kukoski =

Macedonian handball player

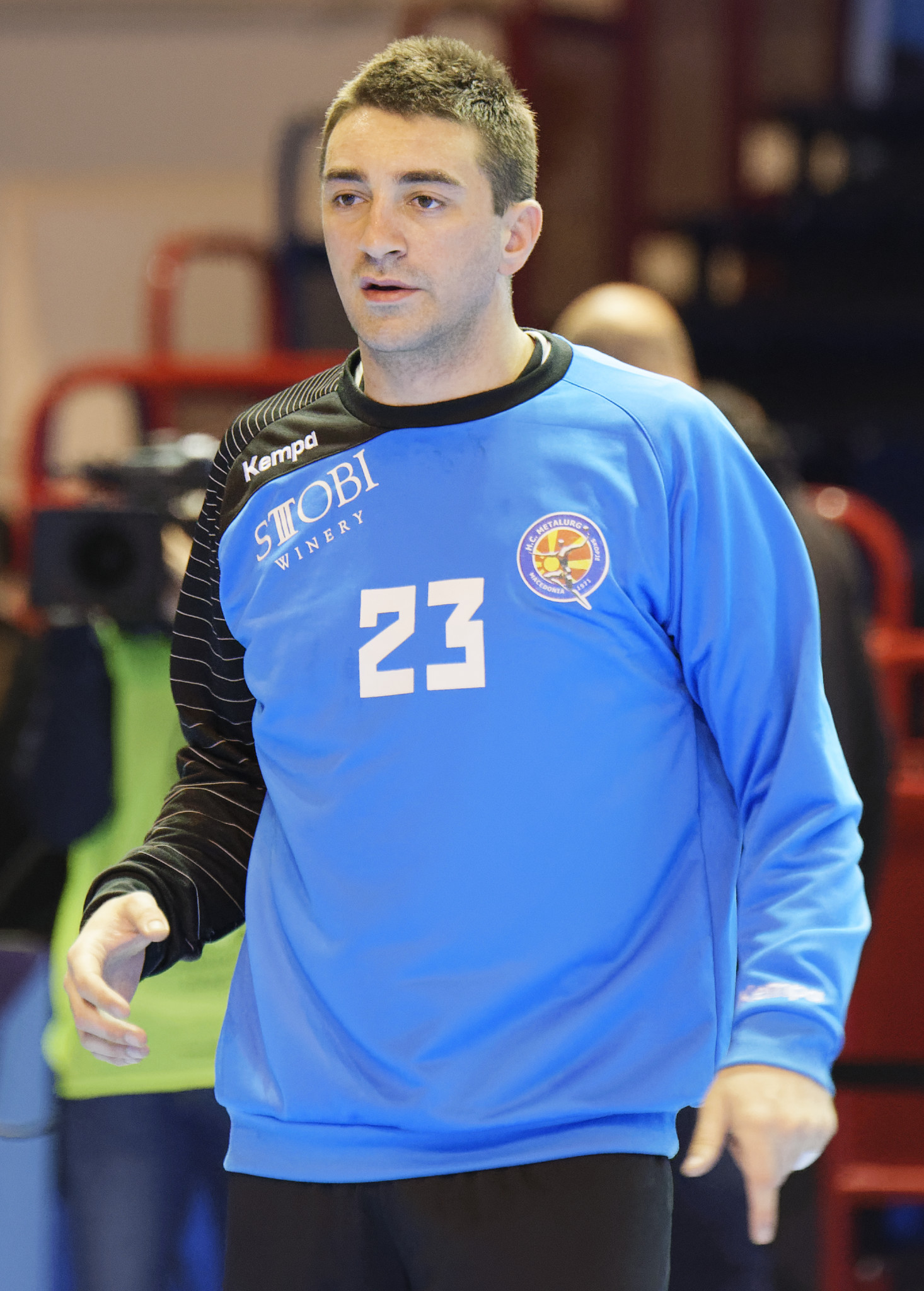

Personal information
- Nationality: Macedonian
- Born: 7 December 1987 (age 38) Struga, Macedonia
- Height: 1.95 m (6 ft 5 in)

Sport
- Sport: Handball
- Position: Left back
- Current club: GRK Ohrid
- Number: 24

Senior clubs
- Years: Team
- 2005–2008: (North Macedonia) RK Pelister
- 2008–2014: (North Macedonia) RK Vardar
- 2013–2014: → (North Macedonia) Zomimak M
- 2014–2016: (North Macedonia) RK Metalurg Skopje
- 2016–2017: (Romania) HC Odorheiu Secuiesc
- 2017–2023: (North Macedonia) RK Eurofarm Pelister
- 2023–: (North Macedonia) GRK Ohrid
National team
Years	Team	Apps	(Gls)
–	Macedonia	33	(165)

Milorad Kukoski (born 7 December 1987) is a Macedonian handball player who plays for GRK Ohrid and for the Macedonia national handball team.

== Honours ==
HC Vardar

- Macedonian Handball Super League

Winner (2):2009,2013

- Macedonian Handball Cup

Winner (2):2012,2014

- SEHA League

Winner (2): 2011–12, 2013–14
HC Pelister

- Macedonian Handball Super League

Winner (1):2023
