= MRK Sesvete =

Croatian handball club

- Full name: Muški rukometni klub Sesvete
- Short name: Sesvete
- Founded: 2000; 26 years ago
- Arena: Srednja škola Jelkovec, Sesvete
- Capacity: 700
- President: Josip Ćurković
- Head coach: Andrija Nikolić
- League: Croatian Premier League
- Club colours
Home	Away

MRK Sesvete is a Croatian team handball club from Sesvete, that plays in the Croatian Premier League.

Location of MRK Sesvete

== Crest, colours, supporters ==
=== Kit manufacturers ===
Period	Kit manufacturer
2019	(Denmark) Hummel
2019–present	(Spain) Joma

=== Kits ===
HOME
2017–19	2023–24	2024–25

AWAY

2023–25

== Team ==
=== Current squad ===
Squad for the 2024–25 season

MRK Sesvete

Goalkeepers

- 1 (Croatia) Filip Perić
- 12 (Croatia) Nikola Kahlina
- 16 (Croatia) Leo Branko Sunajko

Left Wingers

- 24 (Croatia) Karlo Godec
- 27 (Croatia) Nikola Finek

Right Wingers

- 15 (Croatia) Filip Turcić
- 99 (Croatia) Josip Topić

Line Players

- 10 (Croatia) Nikola Jelovčić
- 17 (Croatia) Zlatko Raužan
- 18 (Croatia) Mislav Šuker

Left Backs

- 7 (Croatia) Patrik Hršak
- 13 (Croatia) Josip Tomić
- 19 (Croatia) Tonći Ivanišević
- 25 (Croatia) David Štrkovic

Central Backs

- 11 (Croatia) Ivan Dumenčić
- 21 (Croatia) Davor Gavrić

Right Backs

- 55 (Croatia) Leon Pavičić

=== Technical staff ===
- Head coach: (Croatia) Igor Vori
- Assistant coach: (Croatia) Josip Cvetković
- Fitness coach: (Croatia) Branimir Šola
- Physiotherapist: (Croatia) Željko Kercel
- Physiotherapist: (Croatia) Filip Šimunović

=== Transfers ===
Transfers for the 2026–27 season

Joining

Leaving

- (Croatia) Zlatko Raužan (LP) to (Croatia) RK Zagreb

=== Transfer History ===
Transfers for the 2025–26 season

Joining

- (Croatia) Petar Lulić (LP) from (Greece) AEK Athens

Leaving

- (Croatia) Marino Marić (LP) to (Hungary) Budai Farkasok KKUK

Transfers for the 2024–25 season

Joining

- (Croatia) Tonći Ivanišević (LB) from (Croatia) MRK Trogir
- (Croatia) Leon Pavičić (RB)
- (Croatia) Marino Marić (LP) from (Germany) TVB Stuttgart

Leaving

- (Croatia) Aleksandar Čaprić (LB) to (Germany) ThSV Eisenach
- (Croatia) Marko Prpić (GK) to (Croatia) RK Maksimir Pastela Zagreb

Transfers for the 2023–24 season

Joining

- (Croatia) Karlo Godec (LW) from (Croatia) RK Nexe Našice
- (Croatia) Matej Ćuk (RB) from (Croatia) MRK Čakovec

Leaving

== Accomplishments ==
- Croatian Premier Handball League:
  - Bronze: 2022, 2023

== EHF ranking ==
As of 05/12/2025

Rank	Team	Points
56	(Finland) BK-46	98
57	(Ukraine) HC Motor Zaporizhzhia	93
58	(Sweden) Ystads IF	93
59	(Croatia) MRK Sesvete	89
60	(Slovenia) RK Trimo Trebnje	88
61	(Greece) AC Diomidis Argous	84
62	(Austria) HC Fivers	82

== Former club members ==
=== Notable former players ===
==== Left wingers ====
- (Croatia) Karlo Godec (2023-)
- (Croatia) Lovro Šprem (2017–2021)

==== Line players ====
- (Croatia) Marino Marić (2025)
- (Croatia) Zlatko Raužan (2021–2026)

==== Central backs ====
- (Croatia) Karpo Sirotić (2020–2021)
- (Bosnia and Herzegovina) Marko Tarabochia (2019)

=== Former coaches ===
Seasons	Coach	Country
2018–2019	Davor Dominiković	(Croatia)
2019–2023	Silvio Ivandija	(Croatia)
2023–	Igor Vori	(Croatia)
