= Predrag Vejin =

Serbian handball player (born 1992)

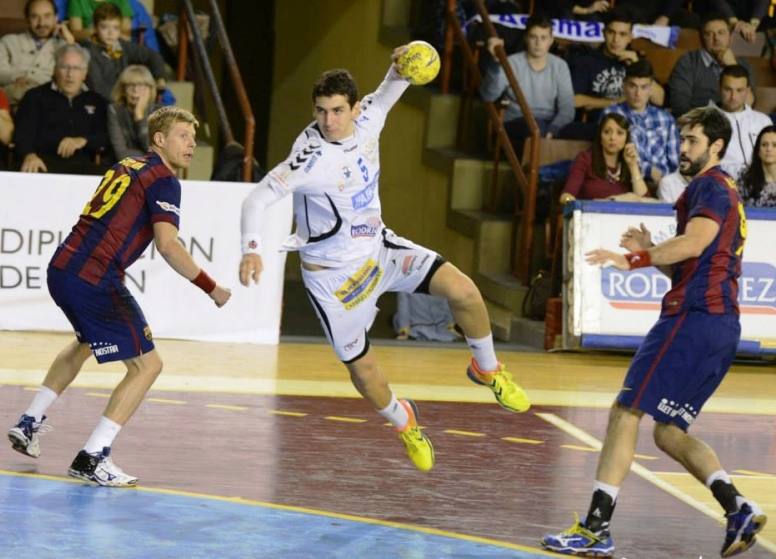

Personal information
- Full name: Predrag Vejin
- Nationality: Serbian
- Born: 17 December 1992 (age 33) Apatin, Serbia, FR Yugoslavia
- Height: 1.99 m (6 ft 6 in)

Sport
- Sport: Handball
- Position: Right back
- Current club: Maccabi Tel Aviv
- Number: 10

Senior clubs
- Years: Team
- –2013: Metaloplastika
- 2013–2015: Ademar León
- 2015–2016: Dunkerque
- 2016–2017: Al Jazira
- 2017: Metalurg Skopje
- 2017–2018: Ademar León
- 2018–2019: Železničar
- 2019–2020: Ramat Hasharon
- 2020–2021: Wisła Płock
- 2021–2024: Nexe Našice
- 2024–2025: Olympiacos
- 2025: Ohrid
- 2026–present: Maccabi Tel Aviv
National team
Years	Team	Apps	(Gls)
2016–	Serbia	16	(28)
- Updated on 30 October 2024

Predrag Vejin (born 17 December 1992) is a Serbian handball player for Maccabi Tel Aviv. He also represents the Serbia national team.
