= Vuko Borozan =

Montenegrin handball player (born 1994)

Personal information
- Nationality: Montenegrin
- Born: 9 April 1994 (age 32) Cetinje, FR Yugoslavia
- Height: 2.03 m (6 ft 8 in)

Sport
- Sport: Handball
- Position: Left back
- Current club: GRK Ohrid
- Number: 1

Youth career
- Years: Team
- 2007–2012: RK Lovćen

Senior clubs
- Years: Team
- 2012–2014: HRK Karlovac
- 2014: RK Metalurg Skopje
- 2014–2016: TuS N-Lübbecke
- 2016–2019: RK Vardar
- 2019–2021: Telekom Veszprém
- 2021–2022: Al Arabi
- 2023: RK Lovćen
- 2024: Al-Hada
- 2024–12/2025: RK Vardar 1961
- 2/2026–: GRK Ohrid
National team
Years	Team	Apps	(Gls)
2014–	Montenegro	34	(121)

Vuko Borozan (born 9 April 1994) is a Montenegrin handball player who plays for GRK Ohrid and the Montenegro national team.

== Achievements ==
=== Vardar ===
- EHF Champions League

Winner: 2016–17

- SEHA League

Winner: 2016–17, 2017–18

- Macedonian Handball Super League

Winner: 2016–17, 2017-18, 2018-19

- Macedonian Handball Cup

Winner: 2017, 2018, 2025

- Macedonian Handball Super Cup

Winner: 2017, 2018, 2019

=== Individual ===
- Montenegrin Sportsperson of the Year

Awards
Preceded by Aleksandar Ivović; Marina Raković	Montenegrin Sportsperson of the Year; 2017	Succeeded by Predrag Radošević
