= Olivier Nyokas =

French handball player (born 1986)

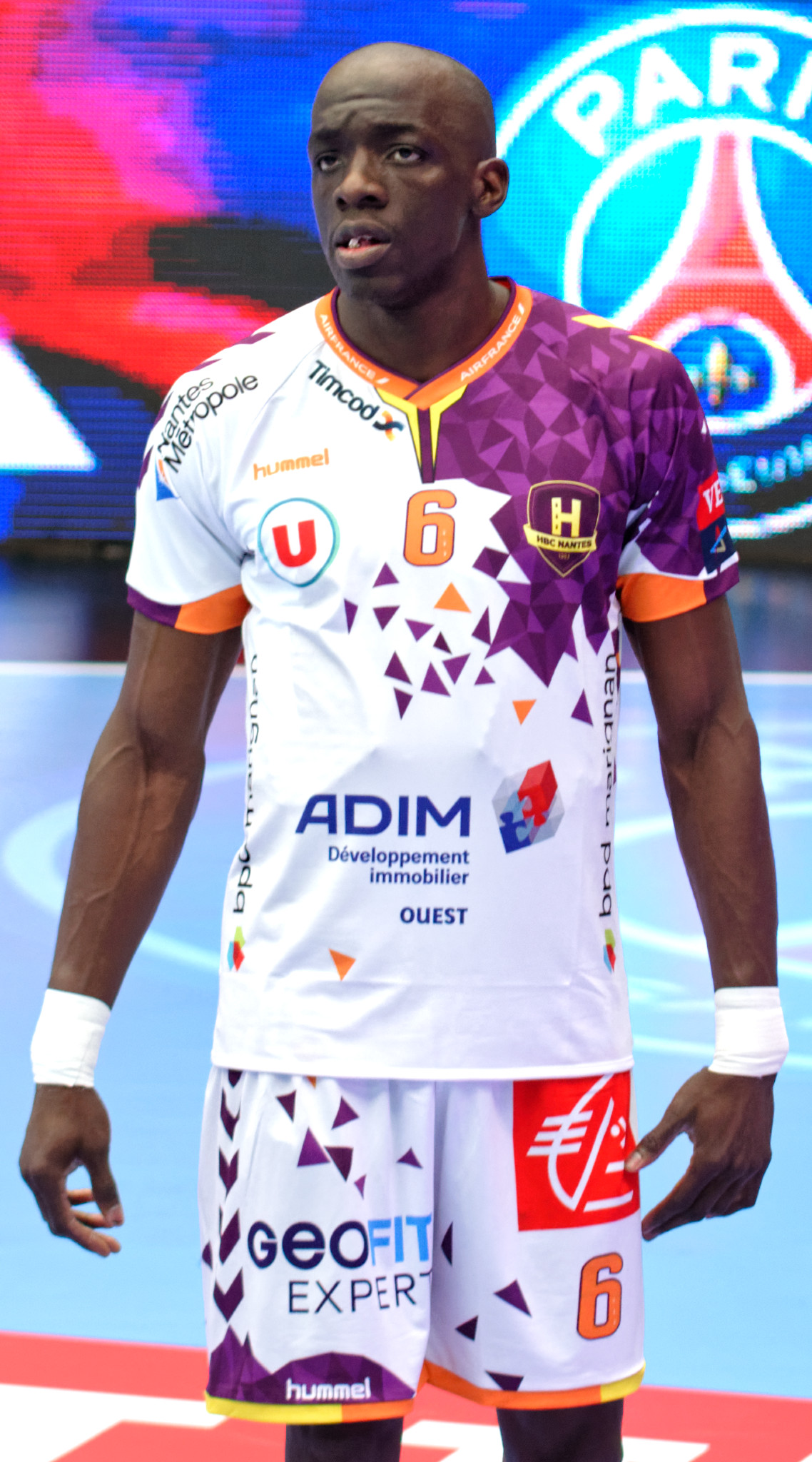
- Nyokas with France in 2016

Personal information
- Full name: Guy Olivier Nyokas
- Nationality: French/Congolese
- Born: 28 June 1986 (age 40) Montfermeil, France
- Height: 1.88 m (6 ft 2 in)

Sport
- Sport: Handball
- Position: Left back
- Current club: Olympiacos

Youth career
- Years: Team
- –: ES Montgeron

Senior clubs
- Years: Team
- -2006: ES Montgeron
- 2006-2007: Paris HB
- 2007-2009: BM Alcobendas
- 2009-2014: US Créteil HB
- 2014-2016: HBW Balingen-Weilstetten
- 2016-2021: HBC Nantes
- 2021-9/2021: RK Metalurg Skopje
- 2021-2022: RK Vardar Skopje
- 2022: Al-Najma
- 2022-: Olympiacos CFP
National team
Years	Team	Apps	(Gls)
2015-2022	France	32	(69)
2022–	DR Congo		
Medal record
Olympic Games
Silver medal – second place	2016 Rio de Janeiro	Team
World Championship
Gold medal – first place	2017 France

Guy Olivier Nyokas (born 28 June 1986) is a French-born Congolese handball player for Olympiacos and the Congolese national team. He has previously played for the French national team, with whom he won the 2017 World Championship.

== Career ==
Nyokas began his career at the second league team ES Montgeron, before joining PSG in 2006.

He then joined BM Alcobendas in the Spanish top league. In 2009 he returned to France and joined US Créteil HB. In 2014 he joined German Bundesliga team HBW Balingen-Weilstetten. In 2016 he joined HBC Nantes. Here he won the French cup in 2017.

In 2021 he joined the North Macedonian team RK Metalurg Skopje together with his twin brother Alix Kévynn Nyokas. The very same season he joined city rivals RK Vardar Skopje. Here he won the 2022 North Macedonian Cup and Championship.

He then joined Qatari team Al-Najma. In August 2022 he joined Greek champions Olympiacos CFP.

=== National team ===
Nyokas debuted for the French national team on 5 November 2015, against Denmark. He represented France at the 2016 European Men's Handball Championship. At the 2016 Olympics he won silver medals.

He won the 2017 World Championship with France.

He then changed to represent DR Congo from 2022 onwards, and represented them at the 2022 African Championship.

== Honors ==
- Macedonian Handball Super League

Winner: 2022

- Macedonian Handball Cup

Winner: 2022
