= Shuichi Yoshida (handballer) =

Japanese handball player (born 2001)

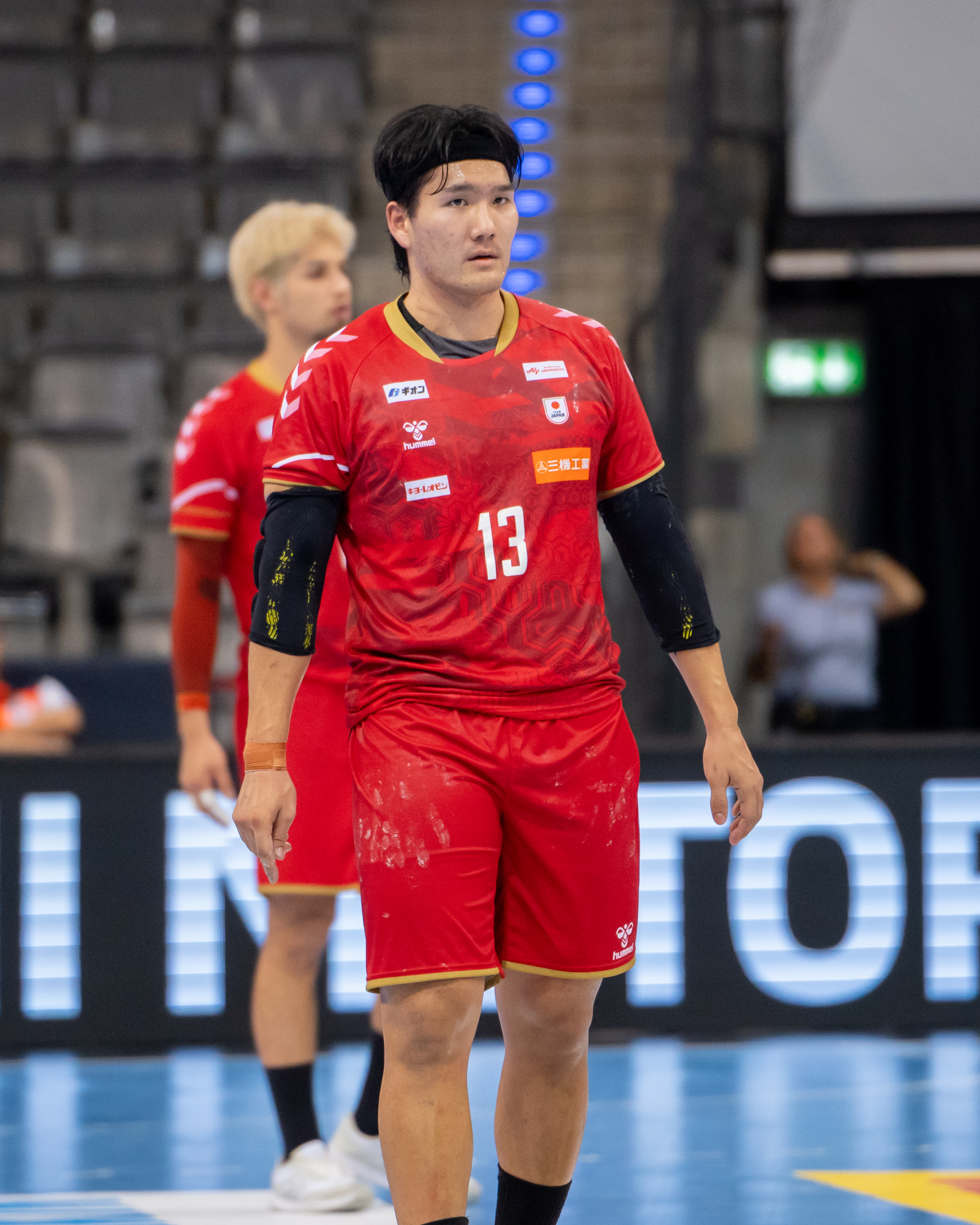
- Yoshida in 2024

Personal information
- Nationality: Japanese
- Born: 26 March 2001 (age 25) Wakayama, Japan
- Height: 1.91 m (6 ft 3 in)

Sport
- Sport: Handball
- Position: Line Player
- Current club: HBC Nantes
- Number: 5

Senior clubs
- Years: Team
- –2020: Univ. of Tsukuba
- 2020–2023: Grupa Azoty Unia Tarnów
- 2023–2024: Dunkerque HGL
- 2024–2026: HBC Nantes
- 2026–: GRK Ohrid
National team
- Years: Team
- –: Japan
Medal record
Asian Championship
Silver medal – second place	2024 Bahrain

Shuichi Yoshida (Yoshida Shūichi; born 26 March 2001) is a Japanese handball player who plays for HBC Nantes and the Japanese national team.

He competed in the 2020 and 2024 Summer Olympics
