= Nikola Danilovski =

Macedonian handball player

Personal information
- Nationality: Macedonian
- Born: 1 February 1997 Skopje, Macedonia
- Died: 29 May 2021 (aged 24) Ohrid, Macedonia
- Height: 1.84 m (6 ft 0 in)

Sport
- Sport: Handball
- Position: Goalkeeper
- Number: 97

Youth career
- Years: Team
- –: RK Metalurg II

Senior clubs
- Years: Team
- –2017: RK Metalurg II
- 2015–2017: → RK Pelister
- 2017–2019: RK Metalurg Skopje
- 2019–2021: GRK Ohrid
National team
- Years: Team
- 2018–2021: Macedonia

Nikola Danilovski (Macedonian: Никола Даниловски; 1 February 1997 – 29 May 2021) was a Macedonian handball player.

He participated at the 2017 Men's Junior World Handball Championship.
