= Ángel Montoro (handballer) =

Spanish handball player (born 1989)

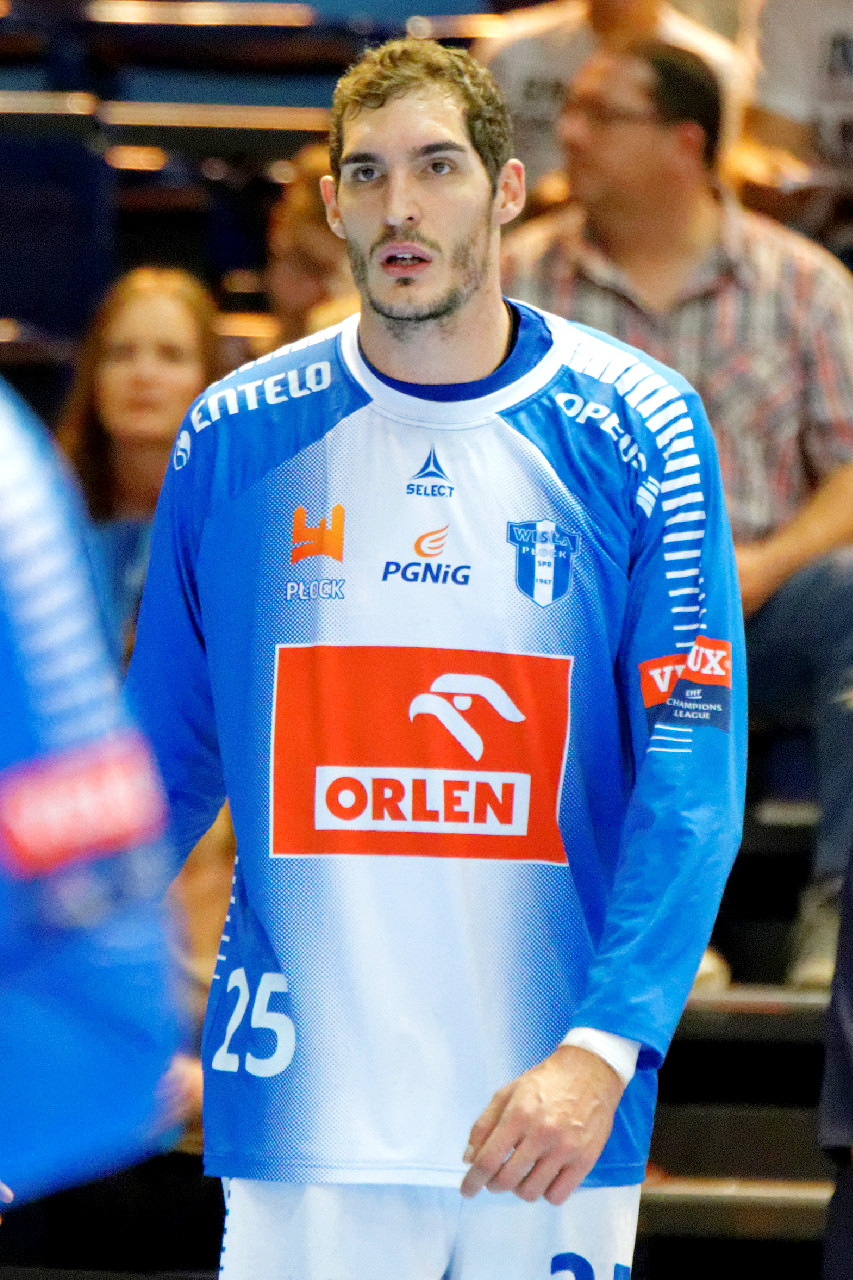

Personal information
- Full name: Ángel Montoro Cabello
- Born: 10 April 1989 (age 37) Toledo, Spain
- Height: 2.13 m (7 ft 0 in)

Sport
- Sport: Handball
- Position: Right Back
- Current club: La Rioja
- Number: 33

Senior clubs
- Years: Team
- 2008–2012: CB Ademar León
- 2012–2014: FC Barcelona
- 2013–2014: → Fenix Toulouse
- 2014–2016: Wisła Płock
- 2016–2018: CBM La Rioja
- 2018–2019: Liberbank Cuenca
- 2019–2021: Kadetten Schaffhausen
- 2021–: Olympiacos H.C.
National team
Years	Team	Apps	(Gls)
2011-	Spain	32	(54)
Medal record
Representing Spain
World Championships
Gold medal – first place	2013 Spain	Team
Mediterranean Games
Bronze medal – third place	2018 Tarragona	Team
- Updated on 20 June 2024

Ángel Montoro Cabello (born 10 April 1989) is a Spanish handball player who plays for Olympiacos H.C.

Internationally he represents Spain, winning the 2013 World Championship.

== Honours ==
=== Club ===
FC Barcelona

- Liga ASOBAL: 2012-2013
- Copa ASOBAL: 2012–13
- Spanish Supercup: 2012–13

=== International ===
- World Handball Championship: 2013
- Mediterranean Games: bronze medal in 2018
