= Alen Kjosevski =

Macedonian handball player

Personal information
- Nationality: Macedonian
- Born: 7 June 2001 (age 25) Bitola, Macedonia
- Height: 1.87 m (6 ft 2 in)

Sport
- Sport: Handball
- Position: Right Wing
- Current club: GRK Ohrid
- Number: 77

Youth career
- Years: Team
- –: RK Vardar

Senior clubs
- Years: Team
- –: RK Vardar Junior
- 2020–12/2025: RK Vardar 1961
- 2020–2021: → HC Rabotnichki
- 1/2026–: GRK Ohrid

Alen Kjosevski (Macedonian: Ален Ќосевски; born 7 June 2001) is a Macedonian handball player who plays for GRK Ohrid.

== Honors ==
- Macedonian Handball Super League

Winner: 2022

- Macedonian Handball Cup

Winner: 2022, 2023
