= Kristian Pilipović =

Austrian handball player (born 1994)

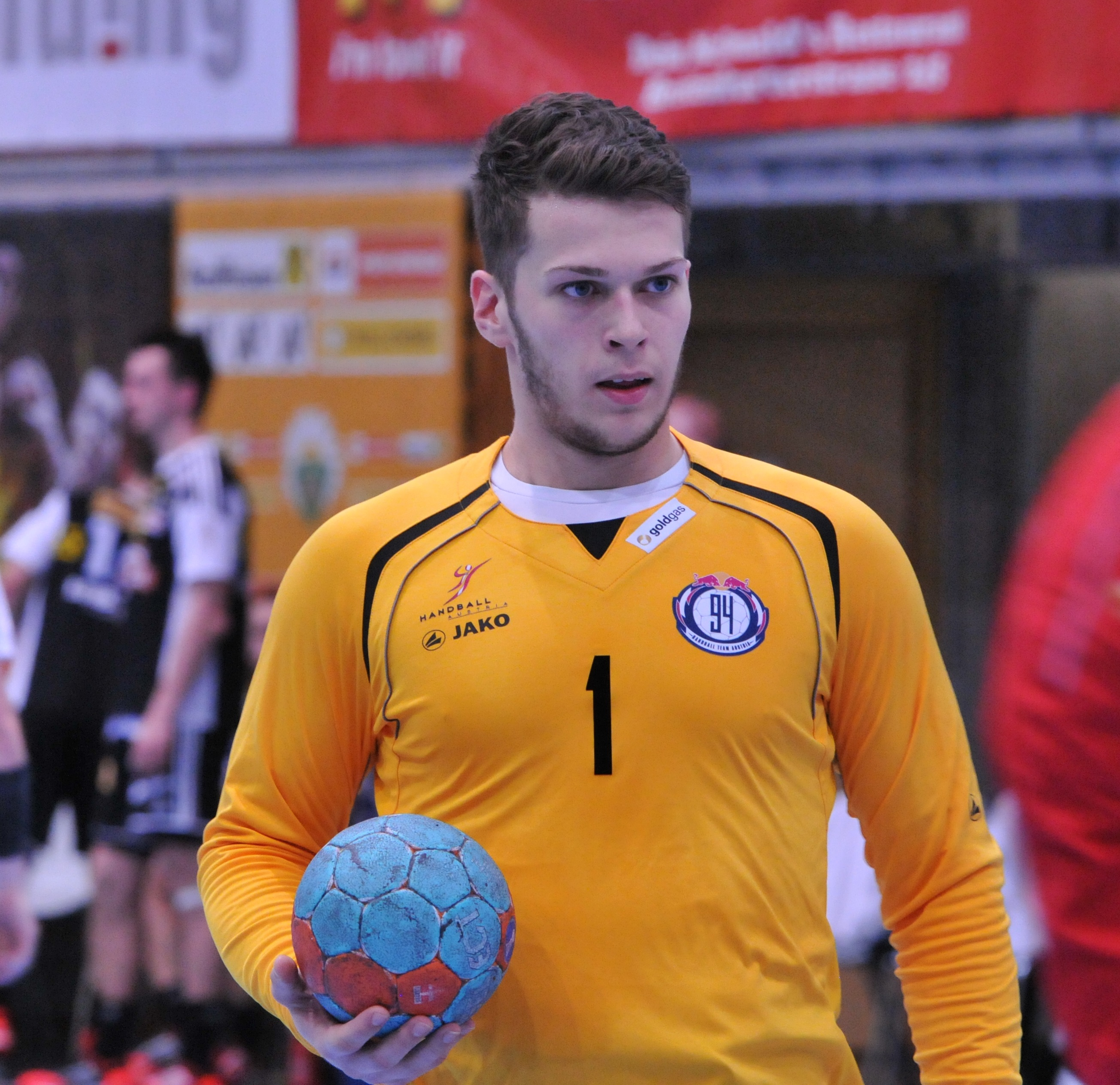

Personal information
- Nationality: Croatian/Austrian
- Born: 10 December 1994 (age 31) Đakovo, Croatia
- Height: 1.90 m (6 ft 3 in)

Sport
- Sport: Handball
- Position: Goalkeeper
- Current club: GRK Ohrid
- Number: 56

Senior clubs
- Years: Team
- 2012–2017: Fivers Margareten
- 2017–2018: RK Nexe Našice
- 2018–2022: Kadetten Schaffhausen
- 2022–12/2022: Wisła Płock
- 12/2022–10/2025: Kadetten Schaffhausen
- 10/2025–2026: GRK Ohrid
- 2026–: HC Kriens-Luzern
National team
Years	Team	Apps	(Gls)
–	Austria	32	(0)
–	Croatia	5	(0)
- Updated on 22. September 2024

Kristian Pilipović (born 10 December 1994) is a Croatian handball player for GRK Ohrid.

In the past he used to represent Austria.

He participated at the 2018 European Men's Handball Championship.
