= Vladan Lipovina =

Montenegrin handball player (born 1993)

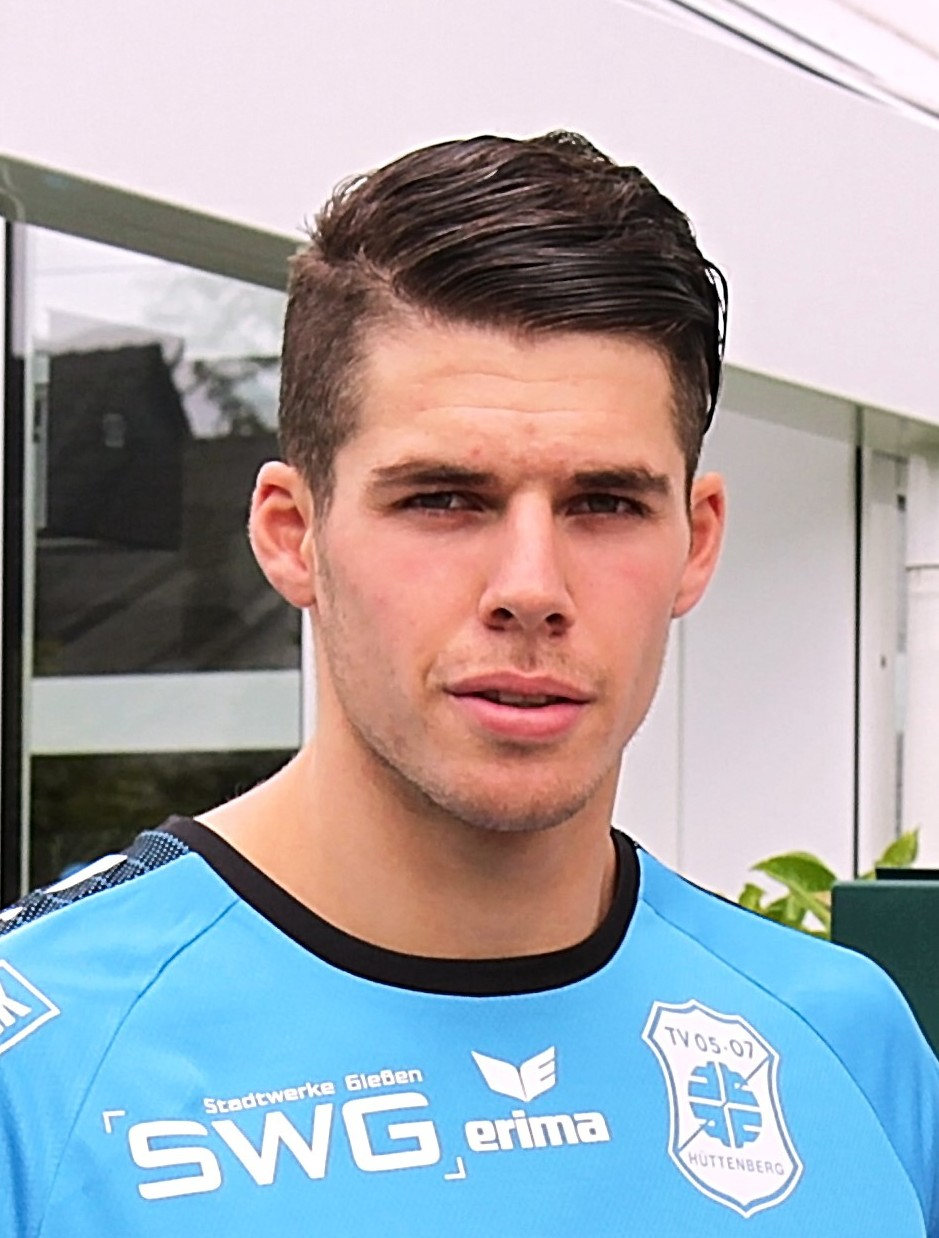

Personal information
- Nationality: Montenegrin
- Born: 7 March 1993 (age 33) Cetinje, FR Yugoslavia
- Height: 1.98 m (6 ft 6 in)

Sport
- Sport: Handball
- Position: Right back
- Current club: Kuwait SC
- Number: 93

Senior clubs
- Years: Team
- –2013: RK Lovćen
- 2013–2014: BM Ciudad Encantada
- 2014: RK Metalurg Skopje
- 2014–2017: HSG Wetzlar
- 2017: Al-Nasr
- 2017–2018: TV Hüttenberg
- 2018–2019: Rhein-Neckar Löwen
- 2019–2022: HBW Balingen-Weilstetten
- 2022–2023: HSG Wetzlar
- 2023: SC Magdeburg
- 2023–2025: Qadsia SC
- 02/2025: → Al Arabi
- 2025–: Kuwait SC
National team
Years	Team	Apps	(Gls)
–	Montenegro	40	(94)

Vladan Lipovina (born 7 March 1993) is a Montenegrin handball player for Kuwait SC.

== Honours ==
- EHF Champions League:
  - Gold: 2023
