= Nenad Mijatović =

Montenegrin basketball player

Free agent
- Position: Point guard / shooting guard

Personal information
- Born: January 22, 1987 (age 39) Split, SR Croatia, SFR Yugoslavia
- Listed height: 1.93 m (6 ft 4 in)
- Listed weight: 82 kg (181 lb)

Career information
- NBA draft: 2009: undrafted
- Playing career: 2001–present

Career history
- 2001–2008: Budućnost Podgorica
- 2008: Kyiv
- 2008–2009: Budućnost Podgorica
- 2009: Murcia
- 2009: Mersin BŞB
- 2011: Lovćen
- 2011–2012: Sloga
- 2012–2013: Maghreb de Fes
- 2014: Budućnost Podgorica
- 2014–2015: RSB Berkane

Career highlights
- Montenegrin League champion (2007); Montenegrin Cup winner (2007)
Medals
Men's basketball
Representing Serbia and Montenegro
U20 European Championship
Gold medal – first place	2006 Turkey	Team
U18 European Championship
Gold medal – first place	2005 Serbia and Montenegro	Team
European Championship for Cadets
Gold medal – first place	2003 Spain	Team

Nenad Mijatović (Cyrillic: Ненад Мијатовић; born January 22, 1987) is a Montenegrin professional basketball player. He last played for RSB Berkane in Morocco.

== Professional career ==
Mijatović was born in Split, Croatia, but moved with his family to Montenegro in the early 1990s, immediately joining the youth system of Budućnost Podgorica. Mijatović was an exceptional talent, so much that he made his professional debut at the age of 14. He kept developing his game as it was expected, and by the age of 18, he was one of the best young players in Serbia and Montenegro. However, in 2007, Mijatović suffered a leg injury that slowed his progress. In the following seasons, Mijatović also had stints abroad, in Spain and Turkey, but failed to make an impression.

== National team ==
Mijatović won three gold medals with the junior national teams of Serbia and Montenegro at the FIBA tournaments. After Montenegro became independent country, Mijatović represented their national team.
