= Bahraini Handball League =

- Current season, competition or edition: 2024–25 Bahraini League
- Sport: Handball
- First season: 1974; 52 years ago
- Administrator: BHF
- No. of teams: 11 teams
- Country: Bahrain
- Confederation: AHF
- Continent: Asia
- Most recent champion: Al Shabab Club (1st title) (2023–24)
- Most titles: Al Ahli Club (18 titles)
- Level on pyramid: Level 1
- Relegation to: National 2
- Domestic cups: Bahraini Cup; Bahraini Super Cup
- International cups: AHF Asian Club Championship; Arab Clubs Championship

The Bahraini Handball League (Arabic: الدوري البحريني لكرة اليد) is the highest level of men's handball in the Bahrain and it is organized by Bahrain Handball Federation. Bahraini Handball League is currently contested by 11 clubs around the country as of the last season 2023–24.

The Preliminary regular season is played by 11 teams, playing each other twice, once at home and once away from home. Then 8 Teams out of 11 Qualify to play the second round robin Tournament, of whom the best 4 teams qualify to the finals to plays the semi and the final match game, to define the champion.

== Titles by clubs ==
Rank	Team Name	Titles
1	Al Ahli Club	18
2	Al Wehda SC	8
3	Al Najma SC	7
4	Bar bar Club	6
5	Al Sulaimaniya SC	3
=	Al Qadisiya Club	3
=	Al Hilal SC	3
8	Al Dair Club	1
=	Al Shabab Club	1

== Winners list ==
Year	Champion
1974–75	Al Sulaimaniya SC
1975–76	Al Sulaimaniya SC
1976–77	Al Sulaimaniya SC
1977–78	Al Qadisiya Club
1978–79	Al Wehda SC
1979–80	Al Qadisiya Club
1980–81	Al Qadisiya Club
1981–82	Al Wehda SC
1982–83	Al Wehda SC
1983–84	Al Ahli Club
1984–85	Al Wehda SC
1985–86	Al Wehda SC
1986–87	Al Ahli Club
1987–88	Al Wehda SC
1988–89	Al Wehda SC
1989–90	Al Wehda SC
1990–91	Al Ahli Club
1991–92	Al Ahli Club

Year	Champion
1992–93	Al Ahli Club
1993–94	Al Ahli Club
1994–95	Al Ahli Club
1995–96	Al Ahli Club
1996–97	Al Ahli Club
1997–98	Al Ahli Club
1998–99	Al Hilal SC
1999–2000	Al Hilal SC
2000–01	Al Hilal SC
2001–02	Al Ahli Club
2002–03	Bar bar Club
2003–04	Bar bar Club
2004–05	Al Ahli Club
2005–06	Bar bar Club
2006–07	Al Ahli Club
2007–08	Al Najma SC
2008–09	Bar bar Club
2009–10	Al Ahli Club

Year	Champion
2010–11	Al Dair Club
2011–12	Al Ahli Club
2012–13	Al Ahli Club
2013–14	Al Ahli Club
2014–15	Al Najma SC
2015–16	Al Ahli Club
2016–17	Al Najma SC
2017–18	Bar bar Club
2018–19	Bar bar Club
2019–20	Al Najma SC
2020–21	Al Najma SC
2021–22	Al Najma SC
2022–23	Al Najma SC
2023–24	Al Shabab Club
2024–25	TB Determined
