= Kuwait Handball League =

- Current season, competition or edition: 2024–25 Kuwaiti League
- Sport: Handball
- First season: 1966; 60 years ago
- Administrator: KHA
- No. of teams: 14 teams
- Country: Kuwait
- Confederation: AHF
- Continent: Asia
- Most recent champion: Kuwait SC (14th titles) (2023–24)
- Most titles: Kuwait SC (14 titles)
- Level on pyramid: Level 1
- Relegation to: National 2
- Domestic cups: Kuwaiti Cup; Kuwaiti Super Cup
- International cups: AHF Asian Club Championship; Arab Clubs Championship

The Kuwaiti Handball League ( Arabic : الدوري الكويتي لكرة اليد للرجال ) is the highest level of men's Handball in Kuwait and it is organized by the Kuwait Handball Association. Kuwaiti Handball League is currently contested by 14 clubs around the country as of the last season 2024–25.

The regular season is played by 14 teams, playing each other twice, once at home and once away from home. After that the final Champion is defined by the team with the most points in the ranking table, the last placed two teams were automatically relegated to the second division.

== Titles by Clubs ==
Rank	Team name	Titles
1	Kuwait SC	15
2	Al Salmiya SC	11
3	Al Arabi SC	10
4	Kazma SC	6
5	Qadsia SC	5
=	Sulaibikhat SC	5
7	Al Fahaheel SC	4
8	Khaitan SC	2

== Winners list ==
Year	Champion
1966–67	Al Arabi SC
1967–68	Al Salmiya SC
1968–69	Al Arabi SC
1969–70	Kazma SC
1970–71	Kuwait SC
1971–72	Al Arabi SC
1972–73	Al Arabi SC
1973–74	Kazma SC
1974–75	Kuwait SC
1975–76	Al Arabi SC
1976–77	Al Arabi SC
1977–78	Al Arabi SC
1978–79	Qadsia SC
1979–80	Al Arabi SC
1980–81	Qadsia SC
1981–82	Qadsia SC
1982–83	Khaitan SC
1983–84	Qadsia SC
1984–85	Kazma SC
1985–86	Al Salmiya SC
1986–87	Sulaibikhat SC

Year	Champion
1987–88	Al Salmiya SC
1988–89	Al Salmiya SC
1989–90	Al Salmiya SC
1990–91	Not Played
1991–92	Kazma SC
1992–93	Al Arabi SC
1993–94	Al Salmiya SC
1994–95	Al Salmiya SC
1995–96	Al Salmiya SC
1996–97	Al Salmiya SC
1997–98	Kazma SC
1998–99	Al Salmiya SC
1999–2000	Kazma SC
2000–01	Al Salmiya SC
2001–02	Khaitan SC
2002–03	Sulaibikhat SC
2003–04	Al Fahaheel SC
2004–05	Sulaibikhat SC
2005–06	Qadsia SC
2006–07	Sulaibikhat SC
2007–08	Al Fahaheel SC

Year	Champion
2008–09	Sulaibikhat SC
2009–10	Al Fahaheel SC
2010–11	Al Fahaheel SC
2011–12	Al Arabi SC
2012–13	Kuwait SC
2013–14	Kuwait SC
2014–15	Kuwait SC
2015–16	Kuwait SC
2016–17	Kuwait SC
2017–18	Kuwait SC
2018–19	Kuwait SC
2019–20	Kuwait SC
2020–21	Kuwait SC
2021–22	Kuwait SC
2022–23	Kuwait SC
2023–24	Kuwait SC
2024–25	Kuwait SC
