= MRK Trogir =

Croatian handball club

- Full name: Muški rukometni klub Trogir
- Short name: Trogir
- Founded: 1948; 77 years ago
- Arena: Sportska Dvorana Vinko Kandija, Trogir
- President: Goran Pitesa
- Head coach: Ivan Mlačić
- League: Croatian Premier League
- Club colours
Home	Away

MRK Trogir is a Croatian team handball club from Trogir, that plays in the Croatian Premier League.

Location of MRK Trogir

== Crest, colours, supporters ==
=== Kit manufacturers ===
Period	Kit manufacturer
2023	(Denmark) Hummel
2023–present	(Spain) Joma

=== Kits ===
HOME
2022–23	2023–24

AWAY
2022–23	2023–24

THIRD
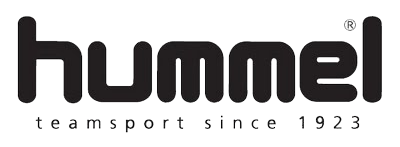
2022–23

== Team ==
=== Current squad ===
Squad for the 2023–24 season

MRK Trogir

Goalkeepers

- 1 (Croatia) Toma Lučin
- 22 (Croatia) Ivan Vranješ
- 99 (Croatia) Luka Baković

Left Wingers

- 2 (Croatia) Ivan Peran
- 3 (Croatia) Grgo Luketin

Right Wingers

- 5 (Croatia) Frane Jelić
- 11 (Croatia) Toni Špika
- 19 (Croatia) Marino Vulić

Line Players

- 10 (Croatia) Luigi Drnasin
- 32 (Croatia) Tomislav Bradarić-Šljujo
- 77 (Croatia) Roko Trivković

Left Backs

- 9 (Croatia) Luka Pitesa
- 23 (Croatia) Paolo Roki
- 31 (Croatia) Tonći Ivanišević

Central Backs

- 6 (Croatia) Lucijan Drnasin
- 7 (Croatia) Tomislav Radnić
- 13 (Croatia) Berislav Antonio Tokić

Right Backs

- 14 (Croatia) Mateo Cudina
- 24 (Croatia) Luka Smoljo

=== Technical staff ===
- Head coach: (Croatia) Ivan Mlačić
- Assistant coach: (Croatia) Toni Markota
- Physiotherapist: (Croatia) Goran Vuković

=== Transfers ===
Transfers for the 2024–25 season

Joining

Leaving

- (Croatia) Tonći Ivanišević (LB) to (Croatia) MRK Sesvete

== Accomplishments ==
- Croatian Handball Cup:
  - Silver: 2023

== EHF ranking ==
As of 05/12/2025

Rank	Team	Points
189	(Czech Republic) Talent Plzeň	13
190	(Turkey) Köyceğiz Bld SK	13
191	(Switzerland) Wacker Thun	13
192	(Croatia) MRK Trogir	13
193	(Russia) HBC CSKA	12
194	(Germany) HC Erlangen	12
195	(Estonia) HC Tallinn	12
