= RK Nexe Našice =

Professional handball club from Našice, Croatia

- Full name: Rukometni klub Nexe Našice
- Short name: RK Nexe
- Founded: 1959; 67 years ago
- Arena: Sportska dvorana kralja Tomislava, Našice
- Capacity: 2,500
- President: Josip Ergović
- Head coach: Saša Barišić Jaman
- League: Croatian Premier League; EHF European League
- Club colours
Home	Away

Rukometni klub Nexe Našice (English: Nexe Našice Handball Club), commonly referred to as RK Nexe Našice or simply Nexe, is a professional handball club from Našice, Croatia. RK Nexe competes in the Premijer liga, Croatian Handball Cup and EHF European League.

Location of RK Nexe Našice

== History ==
Since its formation in 1959, the club carried names like "Partizan", "NAŠK", "Kobra Jeans" and simply "Našice". In 2006 Nexe Group became main club sponsor and since then club carries present name. Since the 2008/2009 season, the team has always finished second in the league behind RK Zagreb. The club made its international debut in the 2008/09 EHF Cup. Since then, he has participated in this competition every season.

== Crest, colours, supporters ==
=== Kits ===
HOME
2014–16	2017–18	2018–19	2020–21	2021–22	2022–23	2023–24

AWAY
2013–14	2014–16	2016–17	2017–18	2018–21	2021–22	2022–23	2023–24

THIRD
2018–19	2021–22	2022–23	2023–24

== Management ==
Position	Name
President	(Croatia) Josip Ergović
Vice President	(Croatia) Hrvoje Šimić
Executive Director	(Croatia) Marko Sertić
Sport Director	(Croatia) Vedran Zrnić
Secretary	(Croatia) Franjo Lelić

== Current squad ==
Squad for the 2024–25 season

Goalkeepers

- 1 (Croatia) Antun Šarić
- 12 (Croatia) Moreno Car
- 16 (Serbia) Mihailo Radovanović

Left Wingers

- 4 (Montenegro) Aleksandar Bakić
- 25 (Croatia) Ivan Barbić

Right Wingers

- 5 (Croatia) Loris Hromin
- 8 (Bosnia and Herzegovina) Ibrahim Haseljić
- 11 (Slovenia) Gal Marguć

Line Players

- 10 (Poland) Jan Klimków
- 39 (Croatia) Leon Vučko
- 44 (Croatia) Krešimir Kozina

Left Backs

- 9 (Croatia) Lucijan Krajcar
- 17 (Croatia) Matko Moslavac
- 27 (Croatia) Luka Moslavac
- 35 (Croatia) Stjepan Javorček

Central Backs

- 7 (Bosnia and Herzegovina) Mislav Grgić
- 34 (Serbia) Ognjen Cenić
- 41 (Croatia) Tin Lučin
- 24 (Croatia) Tin Kuže

Right Backs

- 13 (Croatia) Petar Krupić
- 20 (Croatia) Borna Manci Mičević
- 33 (Spain) Aleksandar Cenić

=== Technical staff ===
- Head coach: (Croatia) Krešimir Ivanković
- Assistant coach: (Croatia) Albin Eter
- Goalkeeping coach: (Croatia) Perica Lelić
- Fitness coach: (Croatia) Nikola Golub
- Physiotherapist: (Croatia) Gabrijel Hmura
- Physiotherapist: (Croatia) Tomislav Sajda

=== Transfers ===
Transfers for the 2026–27 season

Joining

- (Serbia) Andrija Stankov (LP) from (Serbia) RK Vojvodina

Leaving

- (Croatia) Manuel Štrlek (LW) to (Croatia) RK Zagreb

=== Transfer History ===
Transfers for the 2025–26 season

Joining

- (Poland) Marcel Jastrzębski (GK) on loan from (Poland) Wisła Płock
- (Croatia) Manuel Štrlek (LW) back from loan at (Germany) Füchse Berlin

Leaving

- (Slovenia) Gal Marguč (RW) to (Slovenia) RD Slovan
- (Poland) Jan Klimków (LP) to (Poland) MKS Kalisz
- (Croatia) Moreno Car (GK) to (Croatia) RK Poreč
- (Bosnia and Herzegovina) Mislav Grgić (CB) to (Hungary) Győri ETO-UNI FKC

Transfers for the 2024–25 season

Joining

- (Croatia) Lucijan Krajcar (LB) from (Croatia) RK Poreč
- (Croatia) Petar Krupić (RB) from (Croatia) RK Poreč

Leaving

- (Croatia) Gianfranco Pribetić (LP) to (Germany) TVB Stuttgart
- (Croatia) Manuel Štrlek (LW) on loan at (Germany) Füchse Berlin

== Accomplishments ==
- Croatian First League of Handball
  - Runner-up: 2009, 2021, 2022
- Croatian Handball Cup
  - Runner-up: 2015, 2017, 2018, 2021
- EHF Cup/EHF European League
  - Semi-finals: 2022
  - Quarter-finals (2x): 2018, 2023

== EHF ranking ==
As of 05/12/2025

Rank	Team	Points
16	(Romania) Dinamo București	323
17	(Germany) MT Melsungen	276
18	(Portugal) FC Porto	249
19	(Croatia) RK Nexe Našice	232
20	(Croatia) RK Zagreb	222
21	(Portugal) SL Benfica	219
22	(Spain) Bidasoa Irun	217

== Former club members ==
=== Notable former players ===
- (Croatia) Alen Blažević (2009–2011, 2021–)
- (Croatia) Josip Božić Pavletić (2012–2017)
- (Croatia) Marko Buvinić (2017–2021)
- (Croatia) Ante Gadža (2014–2019)
- (Croatia) Šime Ivić (2012–2014)
- (Croatia) Halil Jaganjac (2018–2022)
- (Socialist Federal Republic of Yugoslavia) Pavle Jurina (1976–1980)
- (Croatia) Nikola Kedžo (2010–2012)
- (Croatia) Krešimir Kozina (2011–2013)
- (Croatia) Franjo Lelić (2008–2015)
- (Croatia) Fran Mileta (2019–)
- (Croatia) Marko Mrđenović (2008–2021)
- (Croatia) Sandro Obranović (2012–2013)
- (Croatia) (Austria) Kristian Pilipović (2017–2018)
- (Croatia) Marin Šipić (2017–2019)
- (Croatia) Ivan Slišković (2011–2013)
- (Croatia) Ivan Sršen (2015–2018, 2019–2020, 2022–)
- (Croatia) Mate Šunjić (2010–2013)
- (Croatia) (Qatar) Mario Tomić (2017–)
- (Croatia) Ivan Vida (2018–2022)
- (Croatia) Vedran Zrnić (2015–2019)
- (Bosnia and Herzegovina) Mirko Herceg (2014–2017)
- (Bosnia and Herzegovina) Marin Vegar (2013–2018)
- (Montenegro) Aleksandar Bakić (2020–)
- (Montenegro) Fahrudin Melić (2021–)
- (Slovenia) Saša Barišić-Jaman (2005–2012, 2015–2022)
- (Slovenia) Matjaž Brumen (2018)
- (Slovenia) Patrik Leban (2017–2019)
- (Slovenia) Gregor Lorger (2016–2017)
- (Slovenia) David Špiler (2016–2017)
- (Serbia) Živan Pešić (2019–2021)
- (Serbia) Predrag Vejin (2021–)
- (Turkey) Can Çelebi (2014–2015, 2018–2019)

=== Former coaches ===
Seasons	Coach	Country
2016–2021	Hrvoje Horvat	(Croatia)
2021–	Branko Tamše	(Croatia)
