= 2021 Asian Men's Club League Handball Championship =

23rd Asian Men's Club League Handball Championship
- Logo of 23rd AHF Asian Men's Club League Handball Championship

Tournament details
- Host country: Saudi Arabia
- Venue(s): 1 (in 1 host city)
- Dates: 12 – 21 June 2021
- Teams: 11 (from 7 confederations)

Final positions
- Champions: (Qatar) Al-Duhail SC (2nd title)
- Runners-up: Al-Kuwait SC
- Third place: (Qatar) Al-Arabi SC
- Fourth place: (Bahrain) Al-Najma

Tournament statistics
- Matches played: 32
- Goals scored: 1,825 (57.03 per match)
- Top scorer(s): (Yemen) Abdelmalek Fodil (46 goals)

‌The 2021 Asian Club League Handball Championship was 23rd edition of the championship held from 12 to 21 June 2021 at Jeddah, Saudi Arabia under the aegis of Asian Handball Federation (AHF). It was the third time in history that the championship was organised by the Saudi Arabian Handball Federation. It also acted as the qualification tournament for the 2021 IHF Men's Super Globe, with top team from the championship directly qualifying for the event to be held also in Jeddah, Saudi Arabia. Al-Duhail SC won the final 27–24 against Al-Kuwait SC for their second Asian Club League title.

== Draw ==
The draw ceremony took place on 2 May 2021 at the King Abdullah Sports City, Jeddah, Saudi Arabia at 10:30 hrs. (local time).

The ceremony was attended by the IHF Vice-President and AHF Treasurer Bader Al-Theyab, AHF Executive Director Dr. Ahmed Abu Al-Lail Al-Failakawi and the representatives of the participating clubs. The draw results are as follows:

Group A	Group B
(Qatar) Al-Arabi SC (Iran) Shahid Shameli Kazeroon (Kuwait) Al-Salmiya SC (Saudi Arabia) Mudhar Club (Bahrain) Al-Najma	(Saudi Arabia) Al-Wehda Club (Uzbekistan) AGMK Club (Yemen) Al-Qatten Club (Iran) Mes Kerman (Qatar) Al-Duhail SC Al-Kuwait SC

== Referees ==
The following referee pairs were selected by the AHF Playing Rules and Referees Commission in co-ordination with the AHF Executive Committee.

Referees
Bahrain	Samir Ali Marhoon; Hussain Saeed Al-Mawt
Iran	Majid Kolahdouzan; Alireza Mousavian
Iraq	Khalid Hussein; Fadhil Imran
Oman	Khamis Al-Wahibi; Omer Al-Shahi

Referees
Saudi Arabia	Mohammed Al-Sager; Ali Mohammed Al-Sugufi
South Korea	Lee Se-ok; Koo Bon-ok
South Korea	Kim Won-jeong; Park Hyun-jin
Uzbekistan	Khasan Ismoilov; Khusan Ismoilov

== Preliminary round ==
All times are local (UTC+3).

=== Group A ===
Pos	Team	Pld	W	D	L	GF	GA	GD	Pts	Qualification
1	(Qatar) Al-Arabi SC	4	4	0	0	118	104	+14	8	Semifinals
2	(Bahrain) Al-Najma	4	3	0	1	121	101	+20	6	Semifinals
3	(Saudi Arabia) Mudhar Club	4	2	0	2	102	104	−2	4	Fifth place game
4	(Kuwait) Al-Salmiya SC	4	1	0	3	106	117	−11	2	Seventh place game
5	(Iran) Shahid Kazeroon	4	0	0	4	99	120	−21	0	Ninth place game

Source: asianhandball2021.com

12 June 2021; 15:00	Mudhar Club (Saudi Arabia)	30–27	(Iran) Shahid Kazeroon	King Abdullah Sports City, Jeddah; Attendance: 0 Referees: Hussein, Imran (IRQ)
12 June 2021; 15:00	Al-Abdulali 7	(17–13)	Heidarpour 9	King Abdullah Sports City, Jeddah; Attendance: 0 Referees: Hussein, Imran (IRQ)
12 June 2021; 15:00	1× (yellow card) 8× (suspension) 1× (red card)	Report	9× (suspension) 1× (red card)	King Abdullah Sports City, Jeddah; Attendance: 0 Referees: Hussein, Imran (IRQ)

12 June 2021; 19:00	Al-Najma (Bahrain)	25–27	(Qatar) Al-Arabi SC	King Abdullah Sports City, Jeddah; Attendance: 0 Referees: Lee, Koo (KOR)
12 June 2021; 19:00	Habib 5	(13–16)	Zouaoui 7	King Abdullah Sports City, Jeddah; Attendance: 0 Referees: Lee, Koo (KOR)
12 June 2021; 19:00	2× (yellow card) 3× (suspension)	Report	1× (yellow card) 4× (suspension)	King Abdullah Sports City, Jeddah; Attendance: 0 Referees: Lee, Koo (KOR)

13 June 2021; 13:00	Al-Salmiya SC (Kuwait)	30–24	(Iran) Shahid Kazeroon	King Abdullah Sports City, Jeddah; Attendance: 0 Referees: Hussein, Imran (IRQ)
13 June 2021; 13:00	Esteki, Al-Bloushi 7	(14–13)	Heidarpour 10	King Abdullah Sports City, Jeddah; Attendance: 0 Referees: Hussein, Imran (IRQ)
13 June 2021; 13:00	2× (yellow card) 2× (suspension)	Report	3× (yellow card) 3× (suspension)	King Abdullah Sports City, Jeddah; Attendance: 0 Referees: Hussein, Imran (IRQ)

13 June 2021; 15:00	Mudhar Club (Saudi Arabia)	24–26	(Qatar) Al-Arabi SC	King Abdullah Sports City, Jeddah; Attendance: 0 Referees: Kolahdouzan, Mousavian (IRI)
13 June 2021; 15:00	Al-Abdulali 9	(9–13)	Frankis 10	King Abdullah Sports City, Jeddah; Attendance: 0 Referees: Kolahdouzan, Mousavian (IRI)
13 June 2021; 15:00	3× (yellow card) 5× (suspension)	Report	1× (yellow card) 4× (suspension)	King Abdullah Sports City, Jeddah; Attendance: 0 Referees: Kolahdouzan, Mousavian (IRI)

14 June 2021; 11:00	Shahid Kazeroon (Iran)	23–30	(Bahrain) Al-Najma	King Abdullah Sports City, Jeddah; Attendance: 0 Referees: Ismoilov, Ismoilov (UZB)
14 June 2021; 11:00	Ghasemi, Oraei 7	(14–16)	Habib 7	King Abdullah Sports City, Jeddah; Attendance: 0 Referees: Ismoilov, Ismoilov (UZB)
14 June 2021; 11:00	3× (suspension)	Report	3× (suspension) 2× (red card)	King Abdullah Sports City, Jeddah; Attendance: 0 Referees: Ismoilov, Ismoilov (UZB)

14 June 2021; 15:00	Mudhar Club (Saudi Arabia)	23–20	(Kuwait) Al-Salmiya SC	King Abdullah Sports City, Jeddah; Attendance: 0 Referees: Marhoon, Al-Mawt (BHR)
14 June 2021; 15:00	three players 4	(9–8)	Esteki 6	King Abdullah Sports City, Jeddah; Attendance: 0 Referees: Marhoon, Al-Mawt (BHR)
14 June 2021; 15:00	1× (yellow card) 4× (suspension)	Report	2× (yellow card) 5× (suspension)	King Abdullah Sports City, Jeddah; Attendance: 0 Referees: Marhoon, Al-Mawt (BHR)

16 June 2021; 13:00	Al-Salmiya SC (Kuwait)	30–35	(Qatar) Al-Arabi SC	King Abdullah Sports City, Jeddah; Attendance: 0 Referees: Kolahdouzan, Mousavian (IRI)
16 June 2021; 13:00	Sami 8	(17–17)	Frankis 8	King Abdullah Sports City, Jeddah; Attendance: 0 Referees: Kolahdouzan, Mousavian (IRI)
16 June 2021; 13:00	1× (yellow card) 1× (suspension)	Report	1× (yellow card) 2× (suspension)	King Abdullah Sports City, Jeddah; Attendance: 0 Referees: Kolahdouzan, Mousavian (IRI)

16 June 2021; 19:00	Al-Najma (Bahrain)	31–25	(Saudi Arabia) Mudhar Club	King Abdullah Sports City, Jeddah; Attendance: 0 Referees: Kim, Park (KOR)
16 June 2021; 19:00	Mohamed 7	(14–12)	Al-Abdulali 7	King Abdullah Sports City, Jeddah; Attendance: 0 Referees: Kim, Park (KOR)
16 June 2021; 19:00	6× (suspension) 2× (red card)	Report	2× (yellow card) 3× (suspension) 2× (red card)	King Abdullah Sports City, Jeddah; Attendance: 0 Referees: Kim, Park (KOR)

17 June 2021; 11:00	Al-Arabi SC (Qatar)	30–25	(Iran) Shahid Kazeroon	King Abdullah Sports City, Jeddah; Attendance: 0 Referees: Ismoilov, Ismoilov (UZB)
17 June 2021; 11:00	Laribi 8	(16–11)	Oraei 6	King Abdullah Sports City, Jeddah; Attendance: 0 Referees: Ismoilov, Ismoilov (UZB)
17 June 2021; 11:00	1× (yellow card) 5× (suspension) 1× (red card)	Report	1× (yellow card) 3× (suspension)	King Abdullah Sports City, Jeddah; Attendance: 0 Referees: Ismoilov, Ismoilov (UZB)

17 June 2021; 19:00	Al-Najma (Bahrain)	35–26	(Kuwait) Al-Salmiya SC	King Abdullah Sports City, Jeddah; Attendance: 0 Referees: Hussein, Imran (IRQ)
17 June 2021; 19:00	Ahmed 8	(19–10)	Al-Shammari 5	King Abdullah Sports City, Jeddah; Attendance: 0 Referees: Hussein, Imran (IRQ)
17 June 2021; 19:00	1× (yellow card) 7× (suspension) 1× (red card)	Report	4× (suspension)	King Abdullah Sports City, Jeddah; Attendance: 0 Referees: Hussein, Imran (IRQ)

=== Group B ===
Pos	Team	Pld	W	D	L	GF	GA	GD	Pts	Qualification
1	(Qatar) Al-Duhail SC	5	5	0	0	176	126	+50	10	Semifinals
2	Al-Kuwait SC	5	4	0	1	153	118	+35	8	Semifinals
3	(Iran) Mes Kerman	5	3	0	2	157	126	+31	6	Fifth place game
4	(Saudi Arabia) Al-Wehda Club	5	2	0	3	173	151	+22	4	Seventh place game
5	(Uzbekistan) AGMK Club	5	1	0	4	135	175	−40	2	Ninth place game
6	(Yemen) Al-Qatten Club	5	0	0	5	105	203	−98	0	

Source: asianhandball2021.com

12 June 2021; 11:00	Al-Qatten Club (Yemen)	19–37	(Iran) Mes Kerman	King Abdullah Sports City, Jeddah; Attendance: 0 Referees: Ismoilov, Ismoilov (UZB)
12 June 2021; 11:00	Fodil 13	(6–18)	Jahani Rayeni 5	King Abdullah Sports City, Jeddah; Attendance: 0 Referees: Ismoilov, Ismoilov (UZB)
12 June 2021; 11:00	2× (suspension) 1× (red card)	Report	1× (yellow card) 4× (suspension)	King Abdullah Sports City, Jeddah; Attendance: 0 Referees: Ismoilov, Ismoilov (UZB)

12 June 2021; 13:00	AGMK Club (Uzbekistan)	21–39	(Qatar) Al-Duhail SC	King Abdullah Sports City, Jeddah; Attendance: 0 Referees: Kim, Park (KOR)
12 June 2021; 13:00	Turapov, Khusanbaev 5	(9–19)	Berrached 8	King Abdullah Sports City, Jeddah; Attendance: 0 Referees: Kim, Park (KOR)
12 June 2021; 13:00	1× (yellow card)	Report	7× (suspension)	King Abdullah Sports City, Jeddah; Attendance: 0 Referees: Kim, Park (KOR)

12 June 2021; 17:00	Al-Wehda Club (Saudi Arabia)	27–28	Al-Kuwait SC	King Abdullah Sports City, Jeddah; Attendance: 0 Referees: Marhoon, Al-Mawt (BHR)
12 June 2021; 17:00	Nantes 8	(15–13)	Al-Gharaballi 6	King Abdullah Sports City, Jeddah; Attendance: 0 Referees: Marhoon, Al-Mawt (BHR)
12 June 2021; 17:00	2× (yellow card) 8× (suspension)	Report	2× (yellow card) 3× (suspension)	King Abdullah Sports City, Jeddah; Attendance: 0 Referees: Marhoon, Al-Mawt (BHR)

13 June 2021; 11:00	AGMK Club (Uzbekistan)	38–26	(Yemen) Al-Qatten Club	King Abdullah Sports City, Jeddah; Attendance: 0 Referees: Al-Sager, Al-Sugufi (KSA)
13 June 2021; 11:00	Tuliboev 10	(18–10)	Fodil 10	King Abdullah Sports City, Jeddah; Attendance: 0 Referees: Al-Sager, Al-Sugufi (KSA)
13 June 2021; 11:00	1× (yellow card) 11× (suspension) 1× (red card)	Report	11× (suspension) 2× (red card)	King Abdullah Sports City, Jeddah; Attendance: 0 Referees: Al-Sager, Al-Sugufi (KSA)

13 June 2021; 17:00	Al-Duhail SC (Qatar)	34–31	(Saudi Arabia) Al-Wehda Club	King Abdullah Sports City, Jeddah; Attendance: 0 Referees: Lee, Koo (KOR)
13 June 2021; 17:00	Hernández 7	(18–16)	Bannour, Nantes 9	King Abdullah Sports City, Jeddah; Attendance: 0 Referees: Lee, Koo (KOR)
13 June 2021; 17:00	2× (yellow card) 3× (suspension) 1× (red card)	Report	1× (yellow card) 7× (suspension)	King Abdullah Sports City, Jeddah; Attendance: 0 Referees: Lee, Koo (KOR)

13 June 2021; 19:00	Mes Kerman (Iran)	24–25	Al-Kuwait SC	King Abdullah Sports City, Jeddah; Attendance: 0 Referees: Kim, Park (KOR)
13 June 2021; 19:00	Barbat 6	(14–13)	Ali 8	King Abdullah Sports City, Jeddah; Attendance: 0 Referees: Kim, Park (KOR)
13 June 2021; 19:00	2× (yellow card) 3× (suspension) 1× (red card)	Report	2× (yellow card) 2× (suspension)	King Abdullah Sports City, Jeddah; Attendance: 0 Referees: Kim, Park (KOR)

14 June 2021; 13:00	Al-Qatten Club (Yemen)	18–40	(Qatar) Al-Duhail SC	King Abdullah Sports City, Jeddah; Attendance: 0 Referees: Kolahdouzan, Mousavian (IRI)
14 June 2021; 13:00	Al-Barak 8	(8–19)	Guehis 17	King Abdullah Sports City, Jeddah; Attendance: 0 Referees: Kolahdouzan, Mousavian (IRI)
14 June 2021; 13:00	4× (suspension)	Report	1× (yellow card) 4× (suspension)	King Abdullah Sports City, Jeddah; Attendance: 0 Referees: Kolahdouzan, Mousavian (IRI)

14 June 2021; 17:00	Al-Wehda Club (Saudi Arabia)	25–32	(Iran) Mes Kerman	King Abdullah Sports City, Jeddah; Attendance: 0 Referees: Al-Wahibi, Al-Shahi (OMA)
14 June 2021; 17:00	Nantes 10	(14–12)	Kiani, Sadeghi 8	King Abdullah Sports City, Jeddah; Attendance: 0 Referees: Al-Wahibi, Al-Shahi (OMA)
14 June 2021; 17:00	2× (suspension)	Report	2× (yellow card) 2× (suspension)	King Abdullah Sports City, Jeddah; Attendance: 0 Referees: Al-Wahibi, Al-Shahi (OMA)

14 June 2021; 19:00	Al-Kuwait SC	34–18	(Uzbekistan) AGMK Club	King Abdullah Sports City, Jeddah; Attendance: 0 Referees: Al-Sager, Al-Sugufi (KSA)
14 June 2021; 19:00	Al-Shammari, Al-Harabi 8	(17–8)	Ignatenko 7	King Abdullah Sports City, Jeddah; Attendance: 0 Referees: Al-Sager, Al-Sugufi (KSA)
14 June 2021; 19:00	1× (yellow card)	Report	3× (suspension) 1× (red card)	King Abdullah Sports City, Jeddah; Attendance: 0 Referees: Al-Sager, Al-Sugufi (KSA)

16 June 2021; 11:00	Mes Kerman (Iran)	35–24	(Uzbekistan) AGMK Club	King Abdullah Sports City, Jeddah; Attendance: 0 Referees: Al-Wahibi, Al-Shahi (OMA)
16 June 2021; 11:00	Alizolfi 7	(16–10)	Ignatenko 10	King Abdullah Sports City, Jeddah; Attendance: 0 Referees: Al-Wahibi, Al-Shahi (OMA)
16 June 2021; 11:00	5× (suspension)	Report	2× (suspension)	King Abdullah Sports City, Jeddah; Attendance: 0 Referees: Al-Wahibi, Al-Shahi (OMA)

16 June 2021; 15:00	Al-Duhail SC (Qatar)	30–27	Al-Kuwait SC	King Abdullah Sports City, Jeddah; Attendance: 0 Referees: Hussein, Imran (IRQ)
16 June 2021; 15:00	Hernández 7	(15–18)	Al-Gharaballi 8	King Abdullah Sports City, Jeddah; Attendance: 0 Referees: Hussein, Imran (IRQ)
16 June 2021; 15:00	2× (yellow card) 7× (suspension)	Report	2× (yellow card) 5× (suspension)	King Abdullah Sports City, Jeddah; Attendance: 0 Referees: Hussein, Imran (IRQ)

16 June 2021; 17:00	Al-Qatten Club (Yemen)	23–49	(Saudi Arabia) Al-Wehda Club	King Abdullah Sports City, Jeddah; Attendance: 0 Referees: Ismoilov, Ismoilov (UZB)
16 June 2021; 17:00	Fodil 10	(13–29)	Bannour 9	King Abdullah Sports City, Jeddah; Attendance: 0 Referees: Ismoilov, Ismoilov (UZB)
16 June 2021; 17:00	2× (suspension)	Report	1× (yellow card) 2× (suspension)	King Abdullah Sports City, Jeddah; Attendance: 0 Referees: Ismoilov, Ismoilov (UZB)

17 June 2021; 13:00	Al-Kuwait SC	39–19	(Yemen) Al-Qatten Club	King Abdullah Sports City, Jeddah; Attendance: 0 Referees: Al-Sager, Al-Sugufi (KSA)
17 June 2021; 13:00	Al-Harabi 13	(17–9)	Fodil 8	King Abdullah Sports City, Jeddah; Attendance: 0 Referees: Al-Sager, Al-Sugufi (KSA)
17 June 2021; 13:00	1× (yellow card) 4× (suspension)	Report	1× (suspension)	King Abdullah Sports City, Jeddah; Attendance: 0 Referees: Al-Sager, Al-Sugufi (KSA)

17 June 2021; 15:00	Mes Kerman (Iran)	29–33	(Qatar) Al-Duhail SC	King Abdullah Sports City, Jeddah; Attendance: 0 Referees: Lee, Koo (KOR)
17 June 2021; 15:00	Barbat 7	(16–13)	four players 5	King Abdullah Sports City, Jeddah; Attendance: 0 Referees: Lee, Koo (KOR)
17 June 2021; 15:00	3× (suspension)	Report	1× (yellow card) 1× (suspension)	King Abdullah Sports City, Jeddah; Attendance: 0 Referees: Lee, Koo (KOR)

17 June 2021; 17:00	Al-Wehda Club (Saudi Arabia)	41–34	(Uzbekistan) AGMK Club	King Abdullah Sports City, Jeddah; Attendance: 0 Referees: Al-Wahibi, Al-Shahi (OMA)
17 June 2021; 17:00	Bannour 10	(20–17)	Ignatenko 9	King Abdullah Sports City, Jeddah; Attendance: 0 Referees: Al-Wahibi, Al-Shahi (OMA)
17 June 2021; 17:00	4× (suspension)	Report	1× (yellow card) 9× (suspension) 1× (red card)	King Abdullah Sports City, Jeddah; Attendance: 0 Referees: Al-Wahibi, Al-Shahi (OMA)

== Knockout stage ==
=== Bracket ===
Semifinals
19 June
(Qatar) Al-Arabi SC	22
Al-Kuwait SC	23(ET)
19 June
(Qatar) Al-Duhail SC	30
(Bahrain) Al-Najma	23

Final
21 June
Al-Kuwait SC	24
(Qatar) Al-Duhail SC	27
Third place
21 June
(Qatar) Al-Arabi SC	25
(Bahrain) Al-Najma	24

=== Ninth place game ===
19 June 2021; 11:00	Shahid Kazeroon (Iran)	33–17	(Uzbekistan) AGMK Club	King Abdullah Sports City, Jeddah; Attendance: 0 Referees: Marhoon, Al-Mawt (BHR)
19 June 2021; 11:00	Fatehizadeh 8	(17–8)	Khusanbaev 6	King Abdullah Sports City, Jeddah; Attendance: 0 Referees: Marhoon, Al-Mawt (BHR)
19 June 2021; 11:00	3× (suspension)	Report	5× (suspension)	King Abdullah Sports City, Jeddah; Attendance: 0 Referees: Marhoon, Al-Mawt (BHR)

=== Seventh place game ===
19 June 2021; 13:00	Al-Salmiya SC (Kuwait)	32–39	(Saudi Arabia) Al-Wehda Club	King Abdullah Sports City, Jeddah; Attendance: 0 Referees: Kim, Park (KOR)
19 June 2021; 13:00	Al-Shammari 6	(16–18)	Three players 8	King Abdullah Sports City, Jeddah; Attendance: 0 Referees: Kim, Park (KOR)
19 June 2021; 13:00	1× (yellow card) 2× (suspension)	Report	1× (yellow card) 6× (suspension)	King Abdullah Sports City, Jeddah; Attendance: 0 Referees: Kim, Park (KOR)

=== Fifth place game ===
19 June 2021; 15:00	Mudhar Club (Saudi Arabia)	29–32	(Iran) Mes Kerman	King Abdullah Sports City, Jeddah; Attendance: 0 Referees: Ismoilov, Ismoilov (UZB)
19 June 2021; 15:00	Al-Huilaili 10	(16–16)	Askari 10	King Abdullah Sports City, Jeddah; Attendance: 0 Referees: Ismoilov, Ismoilov (UZB)
19 June 2021; 15:00	2× (suspension)	Report	4× (suspension)	King Abdullah Sports City, Jeddah; Attendance: 0 Referees: Ismoilov, Ismoilov (UZB)

=== Semifinals ===
19 June 2021
17:00
Al-Arabi SC (Qatar)
22–23 (ET)
Al-Kuwait SC
King Abdullah Sports City, Jeddah
Attendance: 0
Referees: Kolahdouzan, Mousavian (IRI)
Sassi, Zouaoui 5
(8–7)
Zammel 6
3× (yellow card) 2× (suspension)
Report
1× (yellow card) 5× (suspension) 2× (red card)

FT: 19–19 ET: 3–4

19 June 2021; 19:00	Al-Duhail SC (Qatar)	30–23	(Bahrain) Al-Najma	King Abdullah Sports City, Jeddah; Attendance: 0 Referees: Lee, Koo (KOR)
19 June 2021; 19:00	Khaled 7	(15–11)	Habib 7	King Abdullah Sports City, Jeddah; Attendance: 0 Referees: Lee, Koo (KOR)
19 June 2021; 19:00	1× (yellow card) 2× (suspension)	Report	2× (yellow card) 1× (suspension) 1× (red card)	King Abdullah Sports City, Jeddah; Attendance: 0 Referees: Lee, Koo (KOR)

=== Third place game ===
21 June 2021; 15:00	Al-Arabi SC (Qatar)	25–24	(Bahrain) Al-Najma	King Abdullah Sports City, Jeddah; Attendance: 0 Referees: Kim, Park (KOR)
21 June 2021; 15:00	Kakhi 5	(12–7)	Mohamed 5	King Abdullah Sports City, Jeddah; Attendance: 0 Referees: Kim, Park (KOR)
21 June 2021; 15:00	1× (yellow card) 2× (suspension)	Report	3× (suspension) 1× (red card)	King Abdullah Sports City, Jeddah; Attendance: 0 Referees: Kim, Park (KOR)

=== Final ===
21 June 2021; 17:00	Al-Kuwait SC	24–27	(Qatar) Al-Duhail SC	King Abdullah Sports City, Jeddah; Attendance: 0 Referees: Lee, Koo (KOR)
21 June 2021; 17:00	Maaref 5	(12–10)	Hernández 7	King Abdullah Sports City, Jeddah; Attendance: 0 Referees: Lee, Koo (KOR)
21 June 2021; 17:00	2× (yellow card) 5× (suspension)	Report	4× (suspension)	King Abdullah Sports City, Jeddah; Attendance: 0 Referees: Lee, Koo (KOR)

== Final standings ==
Rank	Team
1st place, gold medalist(s)	(Qatar) Al-Duhail SC
2nd place, silver medalist(s)	Al-Kuwait SC
3rd place, bronze medalist(s)	(Qatar) Al-Arabi SC
4	(Bahrain) Al-Najma
5	(Iran) Mes Kerman
6	(Saudi Arabia) Mudhar Club
7	(Saudi Arabia) Al-Wehda Club
8	(Kuwait) Al-Salmiya SC
9	(Iran) Shahid Kazeroon
10	(Uzbekistan) AGMK Club
11	(Yemen) Al-Qatten Club

Team qualified for the 2021 IHF Men's Super Globe

== Statistics ==
=== Top scorers ===
Rank	Player	Club	Goals	Shoots	E%
1	Abdelmalek Fodil	(Yemen) Al-Qatten Club	46	101	46
2	Amine Bannour	(Saudi Arabia) Al-Wehda Club	40	79	51
3	Ernest Ignatenko	(Uzbekistan) AGMK Club	37	65	57
4	Mahdi Saad	(Bahrain) Al-Najma	36	50	72
5	Ahmed Al-Abdulali	(Saudi Arabia) Mudhar Club	35	54	65
6	Mishaal Al-Harabi	Al-Kuwait SC	34	47	72
7	Ángel Hernández	(Qatar) Al-Duhail SC	31	50	62
7	Salaman Barbat	(Iran) Mes Kerman	31	38	82
8	Amine Guehis	(Qatar) Al-Duhail SC	30	35	86
8	Afshin Sadeghi Askari	(Iran) Mes Kerman	30	51	59

=== Top goalkeepers ===
Rank	Player	Club	%	Saves	Shots
1	Mohammad Siavoshishahenayati	(Iran) Shahid Kazeroon	39.2	11	28
2	Abdulaziz Al-Thafiri	Al-Kuwait SC	37.6	38	101
3	Ali Rahimi Kazerooni	(Iran) Shahid Kazeroon	37.5	51	136
4	Nawaf Al-Mutairi	(Saudi Arabia) Al-Wehda Club	37.2	22	59
5	Younes Badiei	(Iran) Shahid Kazeroon	36.3	20	55
6	Saeid Barkhordari	(Qatar) Al-Arabi SC	36.2	66	182
7	Bilal Lepenica	(Qatar) Al-Duhail SC	36.1	26	72
8	Mohamed Ali	(Bahrain) Al-Najma	35.3	80	226
9	Ali Mohamed	(Bahrain) Al-Najma	33.3	5	15
10	Mohammed Al-Salem	(Saudi Arabia) Mudhar Club	32.4	49	151
