= 2023 Arab Handball Championship of Champions =

Handball tournament in Qatif, Saudi Arabia

البطوله العربيه لأندية كرة اليد 2023

Tournament details
- Host country: Saudi Arabia
- Venue: 1 (in 1 host city)
- Dates: 16–27 August
- Teams: 10 (from 2 confederations)

Final positions
- Champions: Al-Kuwait SC (1st title)
- Runners-up: (Egypt) Zamalek SC
- Third place: National Bank of Egypt SC

The 2023 Arab Handball Championship of Champions was the 38th edition of the Arab Handball Championship of Champions which was a qualifying tournament for the 2023 IHF Men's Super Globe. It was held in Qatif, Saudi Arabia from 16 to 27 August 2023.

== Venues ==
All of the matches were played in the Prince Nayef Sports City Hall located in Qatif, Saudi Arabia.

== Teams ==
Following teams were already qualified for the tournament.

Team	Qualified as
(Algeria) ES Aïn Touta	Winner of 2022–23 Algerian Handball Championship
National Bank of Egypt SC	
(Egypt) Zamalek SC	Runner-up of 2022–23 Egyptian Handball League
(Iraq) Al-Hashd Al-Shaabi SC	Third of the 2022–23 Iraq Handball League
Al-Kuwait SC	Winner of 2022–23 Kuwait Handball Premier League
(Kuwait) Al-Arabi SC	Third of 2022–23 Kuwait Handball Premier League
~~(Libya) Al Ahli SC~~ (Note: Al Ahli SC withdraw from the championships.)	
(Saudi Arabia) Mudhar H.C	Winner of 2023 Saudi Handball Championship
(Saudi Arabia) Al-Hada Club	Host and third of 2023 Saudi Handball Championship
(United Arab Emirates) Al Jazira Club	Winner of 2022–23 United Arab Emirates Men's Handball League
(Yemen) Al-Shula	
~~(Yemen) Al-Qatn~~ (Note: Al-Qatn withdraw from the championships.)	

== Preliminary round ==
All times are local (UTC+3).

=== Group I ===
Pos	Team	Pld	W	D	L	GF	GA	GD	Pts	Qualification
1	National Bank of Egypt SC	4	3	1	0	120	109	+11	7	Quarterfinals
2	(Saudi Arabia) Mudhar H.C	4	3	0	1	120	96	+24	6	Quarterfinals
3	Al-Kuwait SC	4	2	1	1	130	111	+19	5	Quarterfinals
4	(Iraq) Al-Hashd Al-Shaabi SC	4	1	0	3	115	144	−29	2	Quarterfinals
5	(United Arab Emirates) Al Jazira Club	4	0	0	4	101	126	−25	0	Ninth place game

Source: AHF

16 August 2023; 15:00	Al Jazira Club (United Arab Emirates)	23–26	Al-Kuwait SC	Qatif; Attendance: 1000
16 August 2023; 15:00	Saoud Al-Hammadi 8	(7–15)	Marzo, Zulueta 6	Qatif; Attendance: 1000
16 August 2023; 15:00	4× (suspension)	Report	1× (yellow card) 3× (suspension)	Qatif; Attendance: 1000

16 August 2023; 15:00	Al-Hashd Al-Shaabi SC (Iraq)	20–37	(Saudi Arabia) Mudhar H.C	Qatif; Attendance: 1000
16 August 2023; 15:00	Nidhal Bin Aid El-Amri 5	(9–16)	Al-Abdulali 8	Qatif; Attendance: 1000
16 August 2023; 15:00	3× (suspension)	Report	1× (suspension)	Qatif; Attendance: 1000

17 August 2023; 13:00	Al-Kuwait SC	32–32	National Bank of Egypt SC	Qatif; Attendance: 100
17 August 2023; 13:00	Zulueta 9	(18–16)	Ahmed Kamal Haasan 8	Qatif; Attendance: 100
17 August 2023; 13:00	5× (suspension)	Report	1× (yellow card) 4× (suspension) 1× (red card)	Qatif; Attendance: 100

17 August 2023; 17:00	Mudhar H.C (Saudi Arabia)	30–22	(United Arab Emirates) Al Jazira Club	Qatif; Attendance: 1000
17 August 2023; 17:00		(12–10)		Qatif; Attendance: 1000
17 August 2023; 17:00	1× (yellow card) 5× (suspension)	Report	1× (yellow card) 5× (suspension)	Qatif; Attendance: 1000

18 August 2023; 13:00	National Bank of Egypt SC	33–29	(Iraq) Al-Hashd Al-Shaabi SC	Qatif; Attendance: 1000
18 August 2023; 13:00		(16–16)		Qatif; Attendance: 1000
18 August 2023; 13:00	1× (yellow card) 5× (suspension)	Report	6× (suspension)	Qatif; Attendance: 1000

18 August 2023; 17:00	Mudhar H.C (Saudi Arabia)	30–29	Al-Kuwait SC	Qatif; Attendance: 1000
18 August 2023; 17:00		(15–14)		Qatif; Attendance: 1000
18 August 2023; 17:00	3× (suspension) 1× (red card)	Report	1× (yellow card) 4× (suspension)	Qatif; Attendance: 1000

20 August 2023; 15:00	Al-Hashd Al-Shaabi SC (Iraq)	40–31	(United Arab Emirates) Al Jazira Club	Qatif; Attendance: 1000
20 August 2023; 15:00		(20–16)		Qatif; Attendance: 1000
20 August 2023; 15:00	4× (suspension) 2× (red card)	Report	3× (suspension)	Qatif; Attendance: 1000

20 August 2023; 17:00	Mudhar H.C (Saudi Arabia)	23–25	National Bank of Egypt SC	Qatif; Attendance: 1000
20 August 2023; 17:00		(9–11)		Qatif; Attendance: 1000
20 August 2023; 17:00	1× (yellow card) 8× (suspension) 2× (red card)	Report	5× (suspension) 1× (red card)	Qatif; Attendance: 1000

21 August 2023; 15:00	Al-Hashd Al-Shaabi SC (Iraq)	26–43	Al-Kuwait SC	Qatif; Attendance: 1000
21 August 2023; 15:00		(12–26)		Qatif; Attendance: 1000
21 August 2023; 15:00	1× (yellow card) 4× (suspension)	Report	5× (suspension)	Qatif; Attendance: 1000

21 August 2023; 17:00	National Bank of Egypt SC	30–25	(United Arab Emirates) Al Jazira Club	Qatif; Attendance: 1000
21 August 2023; 17:00		(11–12)		Qatif; Attendance: 1000
21 August 2023; 17:00	5× (suspension)	Report	1× (yellow card) 7× (suspension)	Qatif; Attendance: 1000

=== Group II ===
Pos	Team	Pld	W	D	L	GF	GA	GD	Pts	Qualification
1	(Egypt) Zamalek SC	4	3	0	1	145	99	+46	6 (Note: Zamalek SC 28–24 Al-Hada Club)	Quarterfinals
2	(Saudi Arabia) Al-Hada Club	4	3	0	1	135	97	+38	6	Quarterfinals
3	(Algeria) ES Aïn Touta	4	2	0	2	117	102	+15	4 (Note: ES Aïn Touta 27–25 Al-Arabi SC)	Quarterfinals
4	(Kuwait) Al-Arabi SC	4	2	0	2	127	109	+18	4	Quarterfinals
5	(Yemen) Al-Shula	4	0	0	4	66	183	−117	0	Ninth place game

Source: AHF
Notes:

16 August 2023; 13:00	ES Aïn Touta (Algeria)	28–34	(Egypt) Zamalek SC	Qatif; Attendance: 1000
16 August 2023; 13:00		(13–18)		Qatif; Attendance: 1000
16 August 2023; 13:00	3× (suspension)	Report	1× (suspension)	Qatif; Attendance: 1000

16 August 2023; 19:00	Al-Hada Club (Saudi Arabia)	52–18	(Yemen) Al-Shula	Qatif; Attendance: 1000
16 August 2023; 19:00		(28–27)		Qatif; Attendance: 1000
16 August 2023; 19:00	2× (suspension)	Report	5× (suspension)	Qatif; Attendance: 1000

17 August 2023; 15:00	Al-Arabi SC (Kuwait)	33-32	(Egypt) Zamalek SC	Qatif; Attendance: 1000
17 August 2023; 15:00		(16–18)		Qatif; Attendance: 1000
17 August 2023; 15:00	1× (yellow card) 4× (suspension)	Report	1× (yellow card) 5× (suspension)	Qatif; Attendance: 1000

17 August 2023; 19:00	Al-Hada Club (Saudi Arabia)	26–22	(Algeria) ES Aïn Touta	Qatif; Attendance: 1000
17 August 2023; 19:00		(15–11)		Qatif; Attendance: 1000
17 August 2023; 19:00	3× (suspension)	Report	1× (yellow card) 6× (suspension)	Qatif; Attendance: 1000

18 August 2023; 15:00	Al-Arabi SC (Kuwait)	40–17	(Yemen) Al-Shula	Qatif; Attendance: 1000
18 August 2023; 15:00		(23–8)		Qatif; Attendance: 1000
18 August 2023; 15:00	3× (suspension)	Report	5× (suspension)	Qatif; Attendance: 1000

18 August 2023; 19:00	Al-Hada Club (Saudi Arabia)	24–28	(Egypt) Zamalek SC	Qatif; Attendance: 1000
18 August 2023; 19:00		(10–15)		Qatif; Attendance: 1000
18 August 2023; 19:00	2× (suspension)	Report	1× (yellow card) 4× (suspension)	Qatif; Attendance: 1000

20 August 2023; 13:00	ES Aïn Touta (Algeria)	40–17	(Yemen) Al-Shula	Qatif; Attendance: 1000
20 August 2023; 13:00		(21–10)		Qatif; Attendance: 1000
20 August 2023; 13:00	3× (suspension)	Report	2× (suspension)	Qatif; Attendance: 1000

20 August 2023; 19:00	Al-Hada Club (Saudi Arabia)	33–29	(Kuwait) Al-Arabi SC	Qatif; Attendance: 1000
20 August 2023; 19:00		(16–14)		Qatif; Attendance: 1000
20 August 2023; 19:00	7× (suspension)	Report	5× (suspension)	Qatif; Attendance: 1000

21 August 2023; 13:00	Zamalek SC (Egypt)	51–14	(Yemen) Al-Shula	Qatif; Attendance: 1000
21 August 2023; 13:00		(26–6)		Qatif; Attendance: 1000
21 August 2023; 13:00	2× (suspension)	Report	1× (suspension) 1× (red card)	Qatif; Attendance: 1000

21 August 2023; 19:00	ES Aïn Touta (Algeria)	27–25	(Kuwait) Al-Arabi SC	Qatif; Attendance: 1000
21 August 2023; 19:00		(15–14)		Qatif; Attendance: 1000
21 August 2023; 19:00	1× (yellow card) 6× (suspension)	Report	3× (suspension)	Qatif; Attendance: 1000

== Knockout stage ==
=== Bracket ===
Quarter-finals
23 August
I.1 National Bank of Egypt SC	28
II.4 (Kuwait) Al-Arabi SC	16
23 August
II.2 (Saudi Arabia) Al-Hada Club	33
I.3 Al-Kuwait SC	37
23 August
II.1 (Egypt) Zamalek SC	36
I.4 (Iraq) Al-Hashd Al-Shaabi SC	27
23 August
II.3 (Algeria) ES Aïn Touta	30
I.2 (Saudi Arabia) Mudhar H.C	36

Semi-finals
25 August
I.1 National Bank of Egypt SC	27
I.3 Al-Kuwait SC	29
25 August
II.1 (Egypt) Zamalek SC	29
I.2 (Saudi Arabia) Mudhar H.C	24

Final
27 August
I.3 Al-Kuwait SC	31
II.1 (Egypt) Zamalek SC	30
Third place
27 August
I.1 National Bank of Egypt SC	29
I.2 (Saudi Arabia) Mudhar H.C	28

5–8th place semifinals
25 August
II.4 (Kuwait) Al-Arabi SC	29
II.2 (Saudi Arabia) Al-Hada Club	27
25 August
II.3 (Algeria) ES Aïn Touta	28
I.4 (Iraq) Al-Hashd Al-Shaabi SC	30

Fifth place game
27 August
II.4 (Kuwait) Al-Arabi SC	32
I.4 (Iraq) Al-Hashd Al-Shaabi SC	33
Seventh place game
27 August
II.3 (Algeria) ES Aïn Touta	32
II.2 (Saudi Arabia) Al-Hada Club	34

=== Quarterfinals ===
23 August 2023; 12:00	National Bank of Egypt SC	28–16	(Kuwait) Al-Arabi SC	Qatif; Attendance: 1000
23 August 2023; 12:00		(12–6)		Qatif; Attendance: 1000
23 August 2023; 12:00	1× (yellow card) 4× (suspension)	Report	1× (yellow card) 6× (suspension) 2× (red card)	Qatif; Attendance: 1000

23 August 2023
14:30
Al-Hada Club (Saudi Arabia)
33–37 (ET)
Al-Kuwait SC
Qatif
Attendance: 1000

(14–15)

2× (yellow card) 6× (suspension)
Report
4× (suspension)

FT: 30–30 ET: 3–7

23 August 2023; 17:00	ES Aïn Touta (Algeria)	30–36	(Saudi Arabia) Mudhar H.C	Qatif; Attendance: 1000
23 August 2023; 17:00		(14–18)		Qatif; Attendance: 1000
23 August 2023; 17:00	1× (yellow card) 9× (suspension)	Report	1× (yellow card) 4× (suspension)	Qatif; Attendance: 1000

23 August 2023; 19:30	Zamalek SC (Egypt)	36–27	(Iraq) Al-Hashd Al-Shaabi SC	Qatif; Attendance: 1000
23 August 2023; 19:30		(18–13)		Qatif; Attendance: 1000
23 August 2023; 19:30	6× (suspension)	Report	1× (yellow card) 6× (suspension)	Qatif; Attendance: 1000

=== 5–8th place semifinals ===
25 August 2023; 13:00	Al-Arabi SC (Kuwait)	29–27	(Saudi Arabia) Al-Hada Club	Qatif; Attendance: 1000
25 August 2023; 13:00		(13–14)		Qatif; Attendance: 1000
25 August 2023; 13:00	2× (yellow card) 8× (suspension)	Report	1× (yellow card) 10× (suspension)	Qatif; Attendance: 1000

25 August 2023; 15:00	ES Aïn Touta (Algeria)	28–30	(Iraq) Al-Hashd Al-Shaabi SC	Qatif; Attendance: 1000
25 August 2023; 15:00		(14–14)		Qatif; Attendance: 1000
25 August 2023; 15:00	2× (yellow card) 6× (suspension) 1× (red card)	Report	2× (suspension)	Qatif; Attendance: 1000

=== Semifinals ===
25 August 2023; 17:00	National Bank of Egypt SC	27–29	Al-Kuwait SC	Qatif; Attendance: 1000
25 August 2023; 17:00		(12–14)		Qatif; Attendance: 1000
25 August 2023; 17:00	8× (yellow card) 3× (red card)	Report	7× (suspension)	Qatif; Attendance: 1000

25 August 2023; 19:30	Zamalek SC (Egypt)	29–24	(Saudi Arabia) Mudhar H.C	Qatif; Attendance: 1000
25 August 2023; 19:30		(13–7)		Qatif; Attendance: 1000
25 August 2023; 19:30	4× (suspension)	Report	1× (suspension)	Qatif; Attendance: 1000

=== Ninth place game ===
24 August 2023; 18:00	Al Jazira Club (United Arab Emirates)	30–15	(Yemen) Al-Shula	Qatif; Attendance: 1000
24 August 2023; 18:00		(17–10)		Qatif; Attendance: 1000
24 August 2023; 18:00	2× (suspension)	Report	6× (suspension)	Qatif; Attendance: 1000

=== Seventh place game ===
27 August 2023; 11:00	ES Aïn Touta (Algeria)	32–34	(Saudi Arabia) Al-Hada Club	Qatif; Attendance: 1000
27 August 2023; 11:00		(14–20)		Qatif; Attendance: 1000
27 August 2023; 11:00	3× (yellow card) 5× (suspension)	Report	3× (yellow card) 1× (red card)	Qatif; Attendance: 1000

=== Fifth place game ===
27 August 2023; 13:00	Al-Arabi SC (Kuwait)	32–33	(Iraq) Al-Hashd Al-Shaabi SC	Qatif
27 August 2023; 13:00		(16–16)		Qatif
27 August 2023; 13:00	2× (suspension) 1× (red card)	Report	4× (suspension)	Qatif

=== Third place game ===
27 August 2023; 17:00	National Bank of Egypt SC	29–28	(Saudi Arabia) Mudhar H.C	Qatif; Attendance: 1000
27 August 2023; 17:00		(17–13)		Qatif; Attendance: 1000
27 August 2023; 17:00	1× (yellow card) 6× (suspension) 2× (red card) 1×	Report	1× (yellow card) 3× (suspension)	Qatif; Attendance: 1000

=== Final ===
27 August 2023; 19:30	Al-Kuwait SC	31–30	(Egypt) Zamalek SC	Qatif; Attendance: 1000
27 August 2023; 19:30		(16–18)		Qatif; Attendance: 1000
27 August 2023; 19:30	1× (yellow card) 3× (suspension)	Report	3× (suspension)	Qatif; Attendance: 1000

== Final standing ==
Rank	Team
1st place, gold medalist(s)	Al-Kuwait SC
2nd place, silver medalist(s)	(Egypt) Zamalek SC
3rd place, bronze medalist(s)	National Bank of Egypt SC
4	(Saudi Arabia) Mudhar H.C
5	(Iraq) Al-Hashd Al-Shaabi SC
6	(Kuwait) Al-Arabi SC
7	(Saudi Arabia) Al-Hada Club
8	(Algeria) ES Aïn Touta
9	(United Arab Emirates) Al Jazira Club
10	(Yemen) Al-Shula

Team qualified to the 2023 IHF Men's Super Globe
