= 2019 Asian Men's Club League Handball Championship =

Tournament details
- Host country: South Korea
- Venue(s): 1 (in 1 host city)
- Dates: 7–17 November 2019
- Teams: 11 (from 1 confederation)

Final positions
- Champions: (Qatar) Al-Arabi Sports Club (1st title)
- Runners-up: (Saudi Arabia) Al-Wehda Club
- Third place: (United Arab Emirates) Sharjah Sports Club
- Fourth place: (Qatar) Al-Wakra Sports Club

‌The 2019 Asian Club League Handball Championship was the 22nd edition of the championship held under the aegis of Asian Handball Federation. The championship was hosted by Korea Handball Federation at Indoor Handball Hall, Samcheok (South Korea) from 7 to 17 November 2019. It was the official competition for men's handball clubs of Asia crowning the Asian champions whose winner will also qualify for the 2020 IHF Super Globe.

== Draw ==
The draw was held on Saturday, 7 September 2019 in the Millennium Hotel & Convention Centre, Salmiya, Kuwait at 19:00 hours in the presence of representatives of the participating clubs.

=== Seeding ===
Teams were seeded according to the AHF COC regulations and rankings of the previous edition of the championship. Teams who had not participate in the previous edition were in Pot 4.

| Pot 1 | Pot 2 | Pot 3 | Pot 4 |
|---|---|---|---|
| (South Korea) SK Hawks (Qatar) Al-Wakrah Club | (Iran) Foolad Mobarakeh Sepahan Isfahan (Iran) Zagros Eslamabad-e Gharb | Al-Kuwait Club; Al-Arabi Club | (United Arab Emirates) Al-Sharjah Club (Saudi Arabia) Al-Wehda Club (Bahrain) Barbar Club; Oman Club (Qatar) Al-Arabi Club |

● (South Korea) Doosan Handball Club withdraw from the championship before the final draw.

== Group A ==
| Team | Pld | W | D | L | GF | GA | GD | Pts |
|---|---|---|---|---|---|---|---|---|
| (Qatar) Al-Arabi Club | 4 | 3 | 0 | 1 | 126 | 98 | +28 | 6 |
| (United Arab Emirates) Al-Sharjah Club | 4 | 3 | 0 | 1 | 111 | 99 | +12 | 6 |
| Al-Kuwait Club | 4 | 3 | 0 | 1 | 115 | 99 | +16 | 6 |
| (South Korea) SK Hawks | 4 | 1 | 0 | 3 | 107 | 115 | −8 | 2 |
| (Iran) Zagros Eslamabad-e Gharb | 4 | 0 | 0 | 4 | 94 | 142 | −48 | 0 |

Source: AHF

| 7 November 2019 | Al-Sharjah (United Arab Emirates) | 29 – 22 | (South Korea) SK Hawks | Samcheok Sports Hall, Samcheok |

| 7 November 2019 | Al-Kuwait | 36 – 24 | (Iran) Zagros Club | Samcheok Sports Hall, Samcheok |

| 8 November 2019 | Al-Kuwait | 32 – 26 | (South Korea) SK Hawks | Samcheok Sports Hall, Samcheok |

| 8 November 2019 | Al-Arabi (Qatar) | 40 – 24 | (Iran) Zagros Club | Samcheok Sports Hall, Samcheok |

| 10 November 2019 | Zagros Club (Iran) | 24 – 31 | (United Arab Emirates) Al-Sharjah | Samcheok Sports Hall, Samcheok |

| 10 November 2019 | Al-Kuwait | 21 – 27 | (Qatar) Al-Arabi | Samcheok Sports Hall, Samcheok |

| 11 November 2019 | Al-Arabi (Qatar) | 32 – 24 | (South Korea) SK Hawks | Samcheok Sports Hall, Samcheok |

| 11 November 2019 | Al-Sharjah (United Arab Emirates) | 22 – 26 | Al-Kuwait | Samcheok Sports Hall, Samcheok |

| 13 November 2019 | SK Hawks (South Korea) | 35 – 22 | (Iran) Zagros Club | Samcheok Sports Hall, Samcheok |

| 13 November 2019 | Al-Sharjah (United Arab Emirates) | 29 – 27 | (Qatar) Al-Arabi | Samcheok Sports Hall, Samcheok |

== Group B ==
| Team | Pld | W | D | L | GF | GA | GD | Pts |
|---|---|---|---|---|---|---|---|---|
| (Saudi Arabia) Al-Wehda Club | 5 | 4 | 0 | 1 | 136 | 117 | +19 | 8 |
| (Qatar) Al-Wakrah Club | 5 | 4 | 0 | 1 | 141 | 119 | +22 | 8 |
| (Bahrain) Barbar Club | 5 | 4 | 0 | 1 | 122 | 117 | +5 | 8 |
| Oman Club | 5 | 2 | 0 | 3 | 116 | 129 | −13 | 4 |
| (Iran) Foolad Mobarakeh Sepahan Isfahan | 5 | 1 | 0 | 4 | 140 | 144 | −4 | 2 |
| (Kuwait) Al-Arabi Club | 5 | 0 | 0 | 5 | 124 | 153 | −29 | 0 |

Source: AHF

| 7 November 2019 | Al-Wakrah (Qatar) | 33 – 31 | (Iran) Foolad | Samcheok Sports Hall, Samcheok |

| 7 November 2019 | Oman | 28 – 22 | (Kuwait) Al-Arabi | Samcheok Sports Hall, Samcheok |

| 7 November 2019 | Barbar (Bahrain) | 22 – 24 | (Saudi Arabia) Al-Wehda | Samcheok Sports Hall, Samcheok |

| 8 November 2019 | Oman | 22 – 23 | (Bahrain) Barbar | Samcheok Sports Hall, Samcheok |

| 8 November 2019 | Al-Arabi (Kuwait) | 26 – 34 | (Qatar) Al-Wakrah | Samcheok Sports Hall, Samcheok |

| 8 November 2019 | Al-Wehda (Saudi Arabia) | 34 – 29 | (Iran) Foolad | Samcheok Sports Hall, Samcheok |

| 10 November 2019 | Al-Wakrah (Qatar) | 23 – 22 | (Saudi Arabia) Al-Wehda | Samcheok Sports Hall, Samcheok |

| 10 November 2019 | Foolad (Iran) | 26 – 27 | Oman | Samcheok Sports Hall, Samcheok |

| 10 November 2019 | Barbar (Bahrain) | 31 – 28 | (Kuwait) Al-Arabi | Samcheok Sports Hall, Samcheok |

| 11 November 2019 | Al-Arabi (Kuwait) | 25 – 31 | (Iran) Foolad | Samcheok Sports Hall, Samcheok |

| 11 November 2019 | Barbar (Bahrain) | 21 – 20 | (Qatar) Al-Wakrah | Samcheok Sports Hall, Samcheok |

| 11 November 2019 | Al-Wehda (Saudi Arabia) | 27 – 20 | Oman | Samcheok Sports Hall, Samcheok |

| 13 November 2019 | Foolad (Iran) | 23 – 25 | (Bahrain) Barbar | Samcheok Sports Hall, Samcheok |

| 13 November 2019 | Al-Wakrah (Qatar) | 31 – 19 | Oman | Samcheok Sports Hall, Samcheok |

| 13 November 2019 | Al-Wehda (Saudi Arabia) | 29 – 23 | (Kuwait) Al-Arabi | Samcheok Sports Hall, Samcheok |

== 9th - 11th Placement ==
9th–11th Place Semifinals
15 November
(Iran) Zagros Club | 24
(Kuwait) Al-Arabi | 25
(Iran) Foolad Mobarakeh

9th–10th Place
16 November
(Kuwait) Al-Arabi | 22
(Iran) Foolad Mobarakeh | 28
11th Place
(Iran) Zagros Club

== 5th - 8th Placement ==
5th–8th Place Semifinals
15 November
Al-Kuwait | 35
Oman | 23
15 November
(Bahrain) Barbar | 30
(South Korea) SK Hawks | 33

5th–6th Place
16 November
Al-Kuwait | 24
(South Korea) SK Hawks | 30
7th–8th Place
16 November
Oman | 23
(Bahrain) Barbar | 25

== Finals ==
Semi-finals
15 November
(Qatar) Al-Arabi | 22
(Qatar) Al-Wakrah | 19
15 November
(Saudi Arabia) Al-Wehda | 30
(United Arab Emirates) Al-Sharjah | 29

Final match
17 November
(Qatar) Al-Arabi | 21
(Saudi Arabia) Al-Wehda | 19
Bronze medal match
17 November
(Qatar) Al-Wakrah | 20
(United Arab Emirates) Al-Sharjah | 21

== Final standings ==
| Rank | Team |
|---|---|
| 1st place, gold medalist(s) | (Qatar) Al-Arabi Club |
| 2nd place, silver medalist(s) | (Saudi Arabia) Al-Wehda Club |
| 3rd place, bronze medalist(s) | (United Arab Emirates) Al-Sharjah Club |
| 4 | (Qatar) Al-Wakrah Club |
| 5 | (South Korea) SK Hawks |
| 6 | Al-Kuwait Club |
| 7 | (Bahrain) Barbar Club |
| 8 | Oman Club |
| 9 | (Iran) Foolad Mobarakeh |
| 10 | (Kuwait) Al-Arabi Club |
| 11 | (Iran) Zagros Club |
