= 2018 Asian Men's Club League Handball Championship =

Tournament details
- Host country: Kuwait
- Venue(s): 1 (in 1 host city)
- Dates: 20 March – 1 April 2019
- Teams: 13 (from 1 confederation)

Final positions
- Champions: (Qatar) Al-Duhail Sports Club (2nd title)
- Runner-up: (Qatar) Al-Wakrah SC
- Third place: (United Arab Emirates) Sharjah Sports Club
- Fourth place: Al-Kuwait SC

Tournament statistics
- Matches played: 43
- Goals scored: 2,317 (53.88 per match)

‌The 2018 Asian Club League Handball Championship was the 21st edition of the championship held under the aegis of Asian Handball Federation. The championship was hosted by Kuwait Handball Association at Al Kuwait Sports Club Stadium, Kuwait City (Kuwait) from 20 March to 1 April 2019. It was the official competition for men's handball clubs of Asia crowning the Asian champions whose winner will also qualify for the 2019 IHF Super Globe.

== Participating clubs ==
Club	Country
Al-Duhail Sports Club	Qatar
Al-Jaish Club	Syria
Al-Karkh SC	Iraq
Al-Sadaqa Club	Lebanon
Al-Wakrah SC	Qatar
Barbar Club	Bahrain
China Dragon Club	China
Kazma SC	Kuwait
Al-Kuwait SC	Kuwait
Mudhar Handball Club	Saudi Arabia
Muscat Club	Oman
Sharjah Sports Club	United Arab Emirates
T-Sports Club	India

== Final standings ==
Rank	Team
1st place, gold medalist(s)	(Qatar) Al-Duhail Sports Club
2nd place, silver medalist(s)	(Qatar) Al-Wakrah SC
3rd place, bronze medalist(s)	(United Arab Emirates) Sharjah Sports Club
4	Al-Kuwait SC
5	(Bahrain) Barbar Club
6	(Saudi Arabia) Mudhar Handball Club
7	(Lebanon) Al-Sadaqa Club
8	(Syria) Al-Jaish Club
9	(Iraq) Al-Karkh SC
10	(Kuwait) Kazma SC
11	(Oman) Muscat Club
12	China Dragon Club
13	(India) T-Sports Club

Team qualified for the 2019 IHF Super Globe
