= Asian Club League Handball Championship =

Men's handball competition in Asia

AHF Club League Championship
- Current season, competition or edition: 2026 Asian Men's Club League Handball Championship
- Founded: 1997; 29 years ago
- Administrator: Asian Handball Federation
- Countries: AHF Members
- Headquarters: Kuwait City (Kuwait)
- Continent: Asia
- Most recent champion: (Kuwait) Burgan SC(1st title)
- Most titles: (Qatar) Al-Sadd SC (5 titles)
- Qualification: IHF Super Globe
- Broadcaster: Al-Kass Sports Channel
- Level on pyramid: 1
- Website: Website

The Asian Men's Club League Handball Championship (AHF Club League Championship) is the annual international competition organised by Asian Handball Federation for the men's handball clubs of Asia. In addition to crowning the Asian champions, the tournament also serves as a qualifying tournament for the IHF Super Globe.

== Summary ==
Ed.	Year	Hosts City	Final			Third place match		
Ed.	Year	Hosts City	Champions	Score	Runners-up	Third place	Score	Fourth place
1	1998; Details	(Jordan) Amman	(Kuwait); Kazma SC	Unknown	(Jordan); Al-Ahli Club	(Iran); Zobahan Cultural SC	Unknown	(Jordan); Al-Salt SC
2	1999; Details	(Iran) Isfahan	(Kuwait); Kazma SC	23–21	(Kuwait); Al-Salmiya SC	(Bahrain); Al-Hilal Club	Unknown	(Qatar); Al-Sadd SC
3	2000; Details	Kuwait City	(Qatar); Al-Sadd SC	Unknown	(Kuwait); Al-Salibikhaet SC	(Bahrain); Al-Hilal Club	Unknown	(Iran); Paykan Sabzevar
4	2001; Details	(Iran) Isfahan	(Qatar); Al-Sadd SC	33–28	(Kuwait); Al-Salmiya SC	(Bahrain); Al-Najma Club	34–34 (2OT) (3–2 pen.)	(Iran); F. M. Sepahan SC
5	2002 (Note: The tournament was ultimately staged from 17 to 27 February 2003.); Details	(United Arab Emirates) Dubai	(Qatar); Al-Sadd SC	33–30	(United Arab Emirates); Al-Ahli Club	(Saudi Arabia); Al-Ahli Club	Unknown	(Bahrain); Al-Najma Club
6	2003; Details	(Lebanon) Beirut	(Qatar); Al-Sadd SC	29–24	(Qatar); Al-Ahli SC	(United Arab Emirates); Al-Nasr Club	31–30	(Kuwait); Al-Salmiya SC
7	2004; Details	(Iran) Tehran	(Kuwait); Al-Fahaheel SC	25–23	(Iran); F. M. Sepahan SC	(Bahrain); Barbar Club	46–44	(Qatar); Al-Sadd SC
8	2005; Details	(Jordan) Amman	(Qatar); Al-Sadd SC	31–28	(Kuwait); Al-Salibikhaet SC	(Bahrain); Al-Ahli Club	30–26	(Saudi Arabia); Al-Ahli Club
9	2006; Details	(Oman) Muscat	(Kuwait); Qadsia SC	38–33	(Qatar); Al-Rayyan SC	(Saudi Arabia); Al-Ahli Club	27–20	(Oman); Muscat Club
10	2007 (Note: The tournament was ultimately staged from 5 to 13 June 2008.); Details	Kuwait City	(Kuwait); Qadsia SC	32–28	(Kuwait); Al-Salibikhaet SC	(Iran); F. M. Sepahan SC	32–27	(Iran); Heyat Kerman
11	2008 (Note: The tournament was ultimately staged from 15 to 25 February 2009.); Details	(Saudi Arabia) Jeddah	(Saudi Arabia); Al-Ahli Club	26–23	(Saudi Arabia); Al-Noor Club	(Qatar); Al-Sadd SC	29–25	(Kuwait); Al-Fahaheel SC
12	2009; Details	(Jordan) Amman	(Kuwait); Al-Salibikhaet SC	31–29	(Lebanon); As-Sadd SC	(Iran); Zobahan Cultural SC	22–20	(Qatar); Al-Sadd SC
13	2010; Details	(Lebanon) Beirut	(Lebanon); As-Sadd SC	33–28	(Saudi Arabia); Mudhar Club	(Qatar); Al-Sadd SC	26–22	(Iran); Zobahan Cultural SC
14	2011; Details	(Saudi Arabia) Dammam	(Saudi Arabia); Mudhar Club	22–19	(Lebanon); As-Sadd SC	(Qatar); El-Jaish SC	30–27	(Saudi Arabia); Al-Khaleej Club
15	2012; Details	(Qatar) Doha	(Qatar); Al-Rayyan SC	26–24	(United Arab Emirates); Al-Ahli Club	Al-Kuwait SC	26–25	(Saudi Arabia); Al-Noor Club
16	2013; Details	(Qatar) Doha	(Qatar); El-Jaish SC	35–27	(Qatar); Al-Rayyan SC	(Lebanon); As-Sadd SC	37–34	(United Arab Emirates); Al-Ahli Club
17	2014; Details	(Qatar) Doha	(Qatar); El-Jaish SC	33–30	(Qatar); Lekhwiya SC	(Kuwait); Al-Qurain SC	35–30	Al-Kuwait SC
18	2015 (Note: The tournament was ultimately staged from 18 to 24 March 2016.); Details	(Qatar) Doha	(Qatar); Lekhwiya SC	Round; Robin	(Bahrain); Al-Najma Club	(Saudi Arabia); Al-Noor Club	Round; Robin	(United Arab Emirates); Al-Ahli Club
19	2016; Details	(Jordan) Amman	(Saudi Arabia); Al-Noor Club	25–23	(Qatar); El-Jaish SC	(Qatar); Lekhwiya SC	31–21	(Iran); Gachsaran Oil & Gas Club
20	2017; Details	(India) Hyderabad	(Bahrain); Al-Najma Club	21–16	(Qatar); Al-Duhail SC	(Qatar); Al-Ahli SC	31–27	(United Arab Emirates); Sharjah SC
21	2018 (Note: The tournament was ultimately staged from 20 March to 1 April 2019.); Details	Kuwait City	(Qatar); Al-Duhail SC	22–21	(Qatar); Al-Wakrah SC	(United Arab Emirates); Sharjah SC	28–27	Al-Kuwait SC
22	2019; Details	(South Korea) Samcheok	(Qatar); Al-Arabi SC	21–19	(Saudi Arabia); Al-Wehda Club	(United Arab Emirates); Sharjah SC	21–20	(Qatar); Al-Wakrah SC
23	2020 (Note: The tournament was ultimately staged from 12 to 21 June 2021.); Details	(Saudi Arabia) Jeddah	(Qatar); Al-Duhail SC	27–24	Al-Kuwait SC	(Qatar); Al-Arabi SC	25–24	(Bahrain); Al-Najma Club
24	2021 (Note: The tournament was ultimately staged from 22 to 30 June 2022.); Details	(India) Hyderabad	Al-Kuwait SC	28–23	(Bahrain); Al-Najma Club	(Kuwait); Qadsia SC	28–27	(Qatar); Al-Arabi SC
25	2022 (Note: The tournament was ultimately staged from 1 to 10 June 2023.); Details	(Iran) Isfahan	(Bahrain); Al-Najma Club	31–30 (2OT)	(Qatar); Al-Duhail SC	(Qatar); Al-Rayyan SC	33–26	(Kuwait); Kazma Club
26	2023; Details	(Kuwait) Sabah Al-Salem	(Saudi Arabia); Al-Khaleej Club	35–33 (2OT)	(Qatar); Al-Arabi SC	Al-Kuwait SC	32–31	(Kuwait); Qadsia SC
27	2024; Details	(Qatar) Doha	(United Arab Emirates); Sharjah SC	27–26	(Saudi Arabia); Al-Khaleej Club	(Qatar); Al-Duhail SC	34–24	(Kuwait); Kazma SC
28	2025 (Note: The tournament was ultimately staged from 6 to 17 June 2026.); Details	(Kuwait) Sabah Al-Salem	(Kuwait); Burgan SC	34–32 (OT)	(Saudi Arabia); Al-Khaleej Club	(Qatar); Al-Duhail SC	33–33 (3–1 pen.)	Al-Kuwait SC

== Medal table (clubs) ==
Rank	Club	Gold	Silver	Bronze	Total
1	(Qatar) Al-Rayan SC	5	2	0	7
2	(Qatar) Al-Sadd SC	5	0	2	7
3	(Qatar) El-Jaish SC^{[7]}	3	1	1	5
4	(Qatar) Al-Duhail SC^{[8]}	2	2	3	7
5	(Kuwait) Qadsia SC	2	0	1	3
6	(Kuwait) Kazma SC	2	0	0	2
7	(Kuwait) Al-Sulaibikhat SC	1	3	0	4
8	(Bahrain) Al-Najma	1	2	1	4
8	(Lebanon) As-Sadd SC	1	2	1	4
10	(Saudi Arabia) Khaleej Club	1	2	0	3
11	Al-Kuwait SC	1	1	1	3
11	(Saudi Arabia) Al-Noor FC	1	1	1	3
13	(Saudi Arabia) Mudhar Club	1	1	0	2
14	(Saudi Arabia) Al-Ahli	1	0	2	3
14	(United Arab Emirates) Sharjah SC	1	0	2	3
16	(Qatar) Al-Arabi SC	1	0	1	2
17	(Kuwait) Al-Fahaheel FC	1	0	0	1
17	(Kuwait) Burgan SC	1	0	0	1
19	(United Arab Emirates) Al-Ahli SC	0	2	0	2
19	(Kuwait) Al-Salmiya SC	0	2	0	2
21	(Qatar) Al-Ahli SC	0	1	1	2
21	(Iran) Foolad Mobarakeh Sepahan	0	1	1	2
23	(Jordan) Al-Ahli SC	0	1	0	1
23	(Qatar) Al-Wakrah Club	0	1	0	1
23	(Saudi Arabia) Al-Wehda Club	0	1	0	1
26	(Iran) Zob Ahan SC	0	0	2	2
26	(Bahrain) Al-Hilal Club	0	0	2	2
28	(Bahrain) Al-Ahli Club	0	0	1	1
28	(United Arab Emirates) Al-Nasr SC	0	0	1	1
28	(Kuwait) Al-Qurain SC	0	0	1	1
28	(Bahrain) Barbar Club	0	0	1	1
Totals (31 entries)		31	26	26	83

Notes

- ^[7] Takeover by Lekhwiya SC in 2017 and now the combined new club is known as Al-Duhail SC.
- ^[8] Known as Lekhwiya SC before 2017.

== Medal table (countries) ==
Rank	Nation	Gold	Silver	Bronze	Total
1	Qatar	12	9	9	30
2	Kuwait	8	6	4	18
3	Saudi Arabia	4	5	3	12
4	Bahrain	2	2	5	9
5	United Arab Emirates	1	2	3	6
6	Lebanon	1	2	1	4
7	Iran	0	1	3	4
8	Jordan	0	1	0	1
Totals (8 entries)		28	28	28	84

== See also ==
- Arab Club Handball Championship
