= Saudi Handball League =

- Current season, competition or edition: 2024–25 Saudi League
- Sport: Handball
- First season: 1977; 49 years ago
- Administrator: SAHF
- No. of teams: 14 teams
- Country: Saudi Arabia
- Confederation: AHF
- Continent: Asia
- Most recent champion: Al Khaleej Club (11th titles) (2023–24)
- Most titles: Al Ahli Jeddah (19 titles)
- Level on pyramid: Level 1
- Relegation to: National 2
- Domestic cups: Saudi Cup; Saudi Super Cup
- International cups: AHF Asian Club Championship; Arab Clubs Championship

The Saudi Handball Super League ( Arabic : الدوري السعودي الممتاز لكرة اليد للرجال ) is the highest level of men's Handball in Saudi Arabia and it is organized by the Saudi Arabian Handball Federation. Saudi Super Handball League is currently contested by 14 clubs around the country as of the last season 2024–25.

The regular season is played by 14 teams, playing each other twice, once at home and once away from home. After that the final Champion is defined by the team with the most points in the ranking table, the last placed two teams were automatically relegated to the second division.

== Titles by Clubs ==
Rank	Team name	Titles
1	Al Ahli Jeddah	19
2	Al Khaleej Club	11
3	Al Noor Club	8
4	Mudhar Club	4
5	Al Wehda Club	4
6	Al Ittihad Jeddah	1

== Winners list ==
Year	Champion
1977–78	Al Ittihad Jeddah
1978–79	Al Ahli Jeddah
1979–80	Al Ahli Jeddah
1980–81	Al Ahli Jeddah
1981–82	Al Khaleej Club
1982–83	Al Khaleej Club
1983–84	Al Khaleej Club
1984–85	Al Khaleej Club
1985–86	Al Ahli Jeddah
1986–87	Al Ahli Jeddah
1987–88	Al Khaleej Club
1988–89	Al Ahli Jeddah
1989–90	Al Ahli Jeddah
1990–91	Al Ahli Jeddah
1991–92	Al Ahli Jeddah
1992–93	Al Khaleej Club
1993–94	Al Khaleej Club
1994–95	Al Noor Club

Year	Champion
1995–96	Al Noor Club
1996–97	Al Ahli Jeddah
1997–98	Al Khaleej Club
1998–99	Al Ahli Jeddah
1999–2000	Al Wehda Club
2000–01	Al Khaleej Club
2001–02	Al Ahli Jeddah
2002–03	Al Ahli Jeddah
2003–04	Al Ahli Jeddah
2004–05	Al Ahli Jeddah
2005–06	Al Ahli Jeddah
2006–07	Al Ahli Jeddah
2007–08	Al Noor Club
2008–09	Al Wehda Club
2009–10	Mudhar Club
2010–11	Mudhar Club
2011–12	Al Noor Club
2012–13	Al Ahli Jeddah

Year	Champion
2013–14	Al Ahli Jeddah
2014–15	Al Noor Club
2015–16	Al Noor Club
2016–17	Al Noor Club
2017–18	Mudhar Club
2018–19	Al Wehda Club
2019–20	Al Wehda Club
2020–21	Al Noor Club
2021–22	Mudhar Club
2022–23	Al Khaleej Club
2023–24	Al Khaleej Club
2024–25	TB Determined
