= 2022 IHF Men's Super Globe =

Tournament details
- Host country: Saudi Arabia
- Venue: 1 (in 1 host city)
- Dates: 18–23 October
- Teams: 12 (from 6 confederations)

Final positions
- Champions: (Germany) SC Magdeburg (2nd title)
- Runners-up: (Spain) Barcelona
- Third place: (Poland) Łomża Industria Kielce
- Fourth place: (Egypt) Al Ahly

Tournament statistics
- Matches played: 24
- Goals scored: 1,535 (63.96 per match)
- Attendance: 30,987 (1,291 per match)
- Top scorers: Hassan Kaddah (45 goals)

‌The 2022 IHF Men's Super Globe was the 15th edition of the yearly club world championship in handball, held from 18 to 23 October 2022 in Dammam, Saudi Arabia under the aegis of the International Handball Federation (IHF). It was the third time in history that the event was organised by the Saudi Arabian Handball Federation.

SC Magdeburg defeated Barcelona in the final to defend their title.

== Venue ==
The championship was played in Dammam, at the Dammam Sports Hall.

Dammam	2022 IHF Men's Super Globe is located in Saudi Arabia
Dammam Sports Hall; Capacity: unknown	2022 IHF Men's Super Globe is located in Saudi Arabia

== Referees ==
At the first two matchdays, it was tested to use three referees instead of the common two. After the second day they used the normal two pairs. Ten referees were used:

Country	Referees
Algeria	Youcef Belkhiri / Sid Ali Hamidi
Argentina	Julian Grillo / Sebastian Lenci
Croatia	Matija Gubica / Boris Milošević
Czech Republic	Vaclav Horáček / Jiri Novotný
Denmark	Mads Hansen / Jesper Madsen
Germany	Robert Schulze / Tobias Tönnies
Slovenia	Bojan Lah / David Sok
South Korea	Koo Bon-pk / Lee Se-ok
Spain	Ignacio García / Andreu Martín
Switzerland	Arthur Brunner / Morad Salah

== Teams ==
Twelve teams competed in the tournament: the winners of the continental tournaments, the defending champion, two host teams and two wild card teams.

Team	Qualified as
(Germany) SC Magdeburg	Defending champion
(Egypt) Al Ahly	Winner of 2022 African Handball Super Cup
Al-Kuwait SC	Winner of Asian Club League Championship
(Australia) Sydney University	Winner of 2022 Oceania Handball Champions Cup
(Mexico) Club Ministros	Winner of North American and Caribbean Senior Club Championship
(Brazil) Handebol Taubaté	Winner of South and Central American Men's Club Handball Championship
(Spain) Barcelona	Winner of EHF Champions League
(Tunisia) Espérance de Tunis	Winner of Arab Handball Championship of Champions
(Saudi Arabia) Mudhar	Host
(Saudi Arabia) Khaleej Club	Host
(Poland) Łomża Industria Kielce	Wildcard (Runner-up of EHF Champions League)
(Portugal) SL Benfica	Wildcard (Winner of EHF European League)

== Draw ==
The draw was held on 29 September 2022.

=== Seeding ===
Pot 1	Pot 2	Pot 3
(Germany) SC Magdeburg (Spain) Barcelona (Brazil) Handebol Taubaté (Egypt) Al Ahly	Al-Kuwait SC (Saudi Arabia) Mudhar (Australia) Sydney University (Mexico) Club Ministros	(Saudi Arabia) Khaleej Club (Tunisia) Espérance de Tunis (Portugal) SL Benfica (Poland) Łomża Industria Kielce

== Preliminary round ==
All times are local (UTC+3).

=== Group A ===
Pos	Team	Pld	W	D	L	GF	GA	GD	Pts	Qualification
1	(Germany) SC Magdeburg	2	2	0	0	76	52	+24	4	Semifinals
2	(Saudi Arabia) Khaleej Club	2	1	0	1	64	56	+8	2	5–8th place semifinals
3	(Australia) Sydney University	2	0	0	2	44	76	−32	0	9–12th place semifinals

Source: IHF
Rules for classification: 1) points; 2) head-to-head points; 3) head-to-head goal difference; 4) head-to-head number of goals scored; 5) goal difference.

18 October 2022; 13:45	SC Magdeburg (Germany)	41–23	(Australia) Sydney University	Dammam Sports Hall, Dammam; Attendance: 250; Referees: Belkhiri, Marín, Sok
18 October 2022; 13:45	Mertens 7	(20–8)	De Kuyper 5	Dammam Sports Hall, Dammam; Attendance: 250; Referees: Belkhiri, Marín, Sok
18 October 2022; 13:45	3× (suspension)	Report	8× (suspension)	Dammam Sports Hall, Dammam; Attendance: 250; Referees: Belkhiri, Marín, Sok

19 October 2022; 16:45	Sydney University (Australia)	21–35	(Saudi Arabia) Khaleej Club	Dammam Sports Hall, Dammam; Attendance: 4,000; Referees: Grillo, Lah, Salah
19 October 2022; 16:45	three players 3	(10–14)	Al Sayyad 6	Dammam Sports Hall, Dammam; Attendance: 4,000; Referees: Grillo, Lah, Salah
19 October 2022; 16:45	3× (suspension)	Report	3× (suspension)	Dammam Sports Hall, Dammam; Attendance: 4,000; Referees: Grillo, Lah, Salah

20 October 2022; 19:00	SC Magdeburg (Germany)	35–29	(Saudi Arabia) Khaleej Club	Dammam Sports Hall, Dammam; Attendance: 3,000; Referees: García, Marín (ESP)
20 October 2022; 19:00	Mertens, Pettersson 5	(17–14)	Kaddah 11	Dammam Sports Hall, Dammam; Attendance: 3,000; Referees: García, Marín (ESP)
20 October 2022; 19:00	2× (yellow card) 2× (suspension)	Report	2× (yellow card) 3× (suspension) 1× (red card)	Dammam Sports Hall, Dammam; Attendance: 3,000; Referees: García, Marín (ESP)

=== Group B ===
Pos	Team	Pld	W	D	L	GF	GA	GD	Pts	Qualification
1	(Egypt) Al Ahly	2	2	0	0	65	58	+7	4	Semifinals
2	(Portugal) SL Benfica	2	1	0	1	67	56	+11	2	5–8th place semifinals
3	(Saudi Arabia) Mudhar	2	0	0	2	57	75	−18	0	9–12th place semifinals

Source: IHF
Rules for classification: 1) points; 2) head-to-head points; 3) head-to-head goal difference; 4) head-to-head number of goals scored; 5) goal difference.

18 October 2022; 19:45	Al Ahly (Egypt)	36–30	(Saudi Arabia) Mudhar	Dammam Sports Hall, Dammam; Attendance: 3,275; Referees: Madsen, García, Lee
18 October 2022; 19:45	Dahroug 9	(18–17)	Bannour 10	Dammam Sports Hall, Dammam; Attendance: 3,275; Referees: Madsen, García, Lee
18 October 2022; 19:45	5× (suspension) 1× (red card)	Report	1× (yellow card) 4× (suspension)	Dammam Sports Hall, Dammam; Attendance: 3,275; Referees: Madsen, García, Lee

19 October 2022; 19:00	Mudhar (Saudi Arabia)	27–39	(Portugal) SL Benfica	Dammam Sports Hall, Dammam; Attendance: 1,200; Referees: Lenci, Gubica, Novotný
19 October 2022; 19:00	Khallaf 6	(10–14)	Rahmel 8	Dammam Sports Hall, Dammam; Attendance: 1,200; Referees: Lenci, Gubica, Novotný
19 October 2022; 19:00	2× (suspension)	Report	6× (suspension)	Dammam Sports Hall, Dammam; Attendance: 1,200; Referees: Lenci, Gubica, Novotný

20 October 2022; 16:45	Al Ahly (Egypt)	29–28	(Portugal) SL Benfica	Dammam Sports Hall, Dammam; Attendance: 2,100; Referees: Horáček, Novotný (CZE)
20 October 2022; 16:45	Khaled Hassan 8	(12–13)	Đorđić 9	Dammam Sports Hall, Dammam; Attendance: 2,100; Referees: Horáček, Novotný (CZE)
20 October 2022; 16:45	5× (suspension)	Report	1× (yellow card) 10× (suspension) 1× (red card)	Dammam Sports Hall, Dammam; Attendance: 2,100; Referees: Horáček, Novotný (CZE)

=== Group C ===
Pos	Team	Pld	W	D	L	GF	GA	GD	Pts	Qualification
1	(Poland) Łomża Industria Kielce	2	2	0	0	86	56	+30	4	Semifinals
2	(Brazil) Handebol Taubaté	2	1	0	1	62	67	−5	2	5–8th place semifinals
3	Al-Kuwait SC	2	0	0	2	54	79	−25	0	9–12th place semifinals

Source: IHF
Rules for classification: 1) points; 2) head-to-head points; 3) head-to-head goal difference; 4) head-to-head number of goals scored; 5) goal difference.

18 October 2022; 11:30	Handebol Taubaté (Brazil)	32–28	Al-Kuwait SC	Dammam Sports Hall, Dammam; Attendance: 250; Referees: Hansen, Lah, Brunner
18 October 2022; 11:30	Perrella Filho 6	(19–12)	Saleh 7	Dammam Sports Hall, Dammam; Attendance: 250; Referees: Hansen, Lah, Brunner
18 October 2022; 11:30	2× (suspension)	Report	1× (yellow card) 1× (suspension)	Dammam Sports Hall, Dammam; Attendance: 250; Referees: Hansen, Lah, Brunner

19 October 2022; 12:15	Al-Kuwait SC	26–47	(Poland) Łomża Industria Kielce	Dammam Sports Hall, Dammam; Attendance: 182; Referees: Milošević, Schulze, Koo
19 October 2022; 12:15	Hernández 6	(14–23)	Tournat 9	Dammam Sports Hall, Dammam; Attendance: 182; Referees: Milošević, Schulze, Koo
19 October 2022; 12:15	2× (suspension)	Report	1× (suspension)	Dammam Sports Hall, Dammam; Attendance: 182; Referees: Milošević, Schulze, Koo

20 October 2022; 12:15	Handebol Taubaté (Brazil)	30–39	(Poland) Łomża Industria Kielce	Dammam Sports Hall, Dammam; Attendance: 300; Referees: Belkhiri, Hamidi (ALG)
20 October 2022; 12:15	Rodrigues, Teles 4	(16–18)	A. Dujshebaev, Nahi 6	Dammam Sports Hall, Dammam; Attendance: 300; Referees: Belkhiri, Hamidi (ALG)
20 October 2022; 12:15	1× (suspension)	Report	4× (suspension)	Dammam Sports Hall, Dammam; Attendance: 300; Referees: Belkhiri, Hamidi (ALG)

=== Group D ===
Pos	Team	Pld	W	D	L	GF	GA	GD	Pts	Qualification
1	(Spain) Barcelona	2	2	0	0	87	42	+45	4	Semifinals
2	(Tunisia) Espérance de Tunis	2	1	0	1	70	58	+12	2	5–8th place semifinals
3	(Mexico) Club Ministros	2	0	0	2	39	96	−57	0	9–12th place semifinals

Source: IHF
Rules for classification: 1) points; 2) head-to-head points; 3) head-to-head goal difference; 4) head-to-head number of goals scored; 5) goal difference.

18 October 2022; 16:00	Barcelona (Spain)	50–18	(Mexico) Club Ministros	Dammam Sports Hall, Dammam; Attendance: 250; Referees: Hamidi, Grillo, Koo
18 October 2022; 16:00	Urdangarin 12	(26–10)	Sánchez Haas 4	Dammam Sports Hall, Dammam; Attendance: 250; Referees: Hamidi, Grillo, Koo
18 October 2022; 16:00	1× (yellow card)	Report	2× (suspension)	Dammam Sports Hall, Dammam; Attendance: 250; Referees: Hamidi, Grillo, Koo

19 October 2022; 14:30	Club Ministros (Mexico)	21–46	(Tunisia) Espérance de Tunis	Dammam Sports Hall, Dammam; Attendance: 110; Referees: Horáček, Tönnies, Lee
19 October 2022; 14:30	Muñiz Gómez, Sánchez Haas 4	(7–21)	Toumi 8	Dammam Sports Hall, Dammam; Attendance: 110; Referees: Horáček, Tönnies, Lee
19 October 2022; 14:30	4× (suspension)	Report	1× (suspension)	Dammam Sports Hall, Dammam; Attendance: 110; Referees: Horáček, Tönnies, Lee

20 October 2022; 14:30	Barcelona (Spain)	37–24	(Tunisia) Espérance de Tunis	Dammam Sports Hall, Dammam; Attendance: 250; Referees: Schulze, Tönnies (GER)
20 October 2022; 14:30	Fabregas 7	(18–12)	Ben Salah 7	Dammam Sports Hall, Dammam; Attendance: 250; Referees: Schulze, Tönnies (GER)
20 October 2022; 14:30	1× (suspension)	Report	1× (yellow card) 1× (red card)	Dammam Sports Hall, Dammam; Attendance: 250; Referees: Schulze, Tönnies (GER)

== Knockout stage ==
=== 9–12th place bracket ===
9–12th place semifinals
22 October
(Australia) Sydney University	26
(Saudi Arabia) Mudhar	29
22 October
Al-Kuwait SC	41
(Mexico) Club Ministros	26

Ninth place game
23 October
(Saudi Arabia) Mudhar	18
Al-Kuwait SC	34
Eleventh place game
23 October
(Australia) Sydney University	33
(Mexico) Club Ministros	29

==== 9–12th place semifinals ====
22 October 2022; 09:30	Sydney University (Australia)	26–29	(Saudi Arabia) Mudhar	Dammam Sports Hall, Dammam; Attendance: 300; Referees: Lenci, Grillo (ARG)
22 October 2022; 09:30	Eisenhuth 6	(13–14)	Acacio 8	Dammam Sports Hall, Dammam; Attendance: 300; Referees: Lenci, Grillo (ARG)
22 October 2022; 09:30	1× (yellow card) 2× (suspension)	Report		Dammam Sports Hall, Dammam; Attendance: 300; Referees: Lenci, Grillo (ARG)

22 October 2022; 11:30	Al-Kuwait SC	41–26	(Mexico) Club Ministros	Dammam Sports Hall, Dammam; Attendance: 550; Referees: Koo, Lee (KOR)
22 October 2022; 11:30	Saleh 12	(18–12)	Sánchez Haas 6	Dammam Sports Hall, Dammam; Attendance: 550; Referees: Koo, Lee (KOR)
22 October 2022; 11:30	1× (suspension)	Report	2× (suspension)	Dammam Sports Hall, Dammam; Attendance: 550; Referees: Koo, Lee (KOR)

==== Eleventh place game ====
23 October 2022; 09:30	Sydney University (Australia)	33–29	(Mexico) Club Ministros	Dammam Sports Hall, Dammam; Attendance: 200; Referees: Belkhiri, Hamidi (ALG)
23 October 2022; 09:30	Dippe 9	(16–15)	Ávalos, Sánchez Haas 5	Dammam Sports Hall, Dammam; Attendance: 200; Referees: Belkhiri, Hamidi (ALG)
23 October 2022; 09:30	1× (yellow card) 3× (suspension)	Report	1× (yellow card) 4× (suspension) 1× (red card)	Dammam Sports Hall, Dammam; Attendance: 200; Referees: Belkhiri, Hamidi (ALG)

==== Ninth place game ====
23 October 2022; 11:30	Mudhar (Saudi Arabia)	18–34	Al-Kuwait SC	Dammam Sports Hall, Dammam; Attendance: 200; Referees: Madsen, Hansen (DEN)
23 October 2022; 11:30	Bannour 5	(5–20)	Saleh 16	Dammam Sports Hall, Dammam; Attendance: 200; Referees: Madsen, Hansen (DEN)
23 October 2022; 11:30	1× (suspension)	Report		Dammam Sports Hall, Dammam; Attendance: 200; Referees: Madsen, Hansen (DEN)

=== 5–8th place bracket ===
5–8th place semifinals
22 October
(Saudi Arabia) Khaleej Club	35
(Portugal) SL Benfica	32
22 October
(Brazil) Handebol Taubaté	31 (2)
(Tunisia) Espérance de Tunis (Pen)	31 (4)

Fifth place game
23 October
(Saudi Arabia) Khaleej Club	30
(Tunisia) Espérance de Tunis	31
Seventh place game
23 October
(Portugal) SL Benfica	32
(Brazil) Handebol Taubaté	27

==== 5–8th place semifinals ====
22 October 2022; 13:30	Khaleej Club (Saudi Arabia)	35–32	(Portugal) SL Benfica	Dammam Sports Hall, Dammam; Attendance: 3,500; Referees: Madsen, Hansen (DEN)
22 October 2022; 13:30	Kaddah 14	(15–16)	Đorđić 8	Dammam Sports Hall, Dammam; Attendance: 3,500; Referees: Madsen, Hansen (DEN)
22 October 2022; 13:30	1× (suspension)	Report	1× (suspension)	Dammam Sports Hall, Dammam; Attendance: 3,500; Referees: Madsen, Hansen (DEN)

22 October 2022
15:30
Handebol Taubaté (Brazil)
33–35
(Tunisia) Espérance de Tunis
Dammam Sports Hall, Dammam
Attendance: 400
Referees: Brunner, Salah (SUI)
De Andrade 6
(14–18)
three players 5
3× (suspension)
Report
4× (suspension)

FT: 31–31 Pen: 2–4

==== Seventh place game ====
23 October 2022; 13:30	SL Benfica (Portugal)	32–27	(Brazil) Handebol Taubaté	Dammam Sports Hall, Dammam; Attendance: 150; Referees: García, Marín (ESP)
23 October 2022; 13:30	Bingo 6	(17–18)	Monte 7	Dammam Sports Hall, Dammam; Attendance: 150; Referees: García, Marín (ESP)
23 October 2022; 13:30	1× (yellow card) 2× (suspension)	Report	1× (suspension)	Dammam Sports Hall, Dammam; Attendance: 150; Referees: García, Marín (ESP)

==== Fifth place game ====
23 October 2022; 15:30	Khaleej Club (Saudi Arabia)	30–31	(Tunisia) Espérance de Tunis	Dammam Sports Hall, Dammam; Attendance: 2,000; Referees: Lenci, Grillo (ARG)
23 October 2022; 15:30	Kaddah 16	(14–15)	Abdelli 9	Dammam Sports Hall, Dammam; Attendance: 2,000; Referees: Lenci, Grillo (ARG)
23 October 2022; 15:30	1× (yellow card) 4× (suspension)	Report	2× (yellow card) 5× (suspension) 1× (red card)	Dammam Sports Hall, Dammam; Attendance: 2,000; Referees: Lenci, Grillo (ARG)

=== Championship bracket ===
Semi-finals
22 October
(Germany) SC Magdeburg	36
(Egypt) Al Ahly	28
22 October
(Poland) Łomża Industria Kielce	28
(Spain) Barcelona	39

Final
23 October
(Germany) SC Magdeburg (ET)	41
(Spain) Barcelona	39
Third place
23 October
(Egypt) Al Ahly	26
(Poland) Łomża Industria Kielce	35

==== Semifinals ====
22 October 2022; 18:00	SC Magdeburg (Germany)	36–28	(Egypt) Al Ahly	Dammam Sports Hall, Dammam; Attendance: 3,000; Referees: Lah, Sok (SLO)
22 October 2022; 18:00	Magnússon 8	(18–17)	Mahmoud 7	Dammam Sports Hall, Dammam; Attendance: 3,000; Referees: Lah, Sok (SLO)
22 October 2022; 18:00	2× (yellow card) 2× (suspension)	Report	2× (suspension) 1× (red card)	Dammam Sports Hall, Dammam; Attendance: 3,000; Referees: Lah, Sok (SLO)

22 October 2022; 20:30	Łomża Industria Kielce (Poland)	28–39	(Spain) Barcelona	Dammam Sports Hall, Dammam; Attendance: 700; Referees: Gubica, Milošević (CRO)
22 October 2022; 20:30	D. Dujshebaev, Tournat 5	(11–16)	Cindrić 6	Dammam Sports Hall, Dammam; Attendance: 700; Referees: Gubica, Milošević (CRO)
22 October 2022; 20:30	2× (suspension)	Report	1× (yellow card) 4× (suspension)	Dammam Sports Hall, Dammam; Attendance: 700; Referees: Gubica, Milošević (CRO)

==== Third place game ====
23 October 2022; 18:00	Al Ahly (Egypt)	26–35	(Poland) Łomża Industria Kielce	Dammam Sports Hall, Dammam; Attendance: 1,800; Referees: Schulze, Tönnies (GER)
23 October 2022; 18:00	Mesilhy 5	(13–16)	Tournat 8	Dammam Sports Hall, Dammam; Attendance: 1,800; Referees: Schulze, Tönnies (GER)
23 October 2022; 18:00	1× (suspension)	Report	4× (suspension)	Dammam Sports Hall, Dammam; Attendance: 1,800; Referees: Schulze, Tönnies (GER)

==== Final ====
23 October 2022
20:30
SC Magdeburg (Germany)
41–39 (ET)
(Spain) Barcelona
Dammam Sports Hall, Dammam
Attendance: 3,120
Referees: Horáček, Novotný (CZE)
Magnússon 12
(21–17)
Gómez 10
4× (suspension)
Report
4× (suspension)

FT: 35–35 ET: 6–4

== Final ranking ==
Rank	Team
1st place, gold medalist(s)	(Germany) SC Magdeburg
2nd place, silver medalist(s)	(Spain) Barcelona
3rd place, bronze medalist(s)	(Poland) Łomża Industria Kielce
4	(Egypt) Al Ahly
5	(Tunisia) Espérance de Tunis
6	(Saudi Arabia) Khaleej Club
7	(Portugal) SL Benfica
8	(Brazil) Handebol Taubaté
9	Al-Kuwait SC
10	(Saudi Arabia) Mudhar
11	(Australia) Sydney University
12	(Mexico) Club Ministros

== Broadcasters ==
Country	Channel
France	handstar.tv
Hungary	Sport TV
Kuwait	KTV Sport
Middle East and North Africa	Sharjah Sport
Poland	TVP Sport
Saudi Arabia	SSC
Countries without a license	Solid Sport
