= 2022 Asian Men's Club League Handball Championship =

24th Asian Men's Club League Handball Championship
- Logo of 24th AHF Asian Men's Club League Handball Championship

Tournament details
- Host country: India
- Venue(s): 1 (in 1 host city)
- Dates: 22 – 30 June 2022
- Teams: 8 (from 6 confederations)

Final positions
- Champions: Al-Kuwait SC (1st title)
- Runners-up: (Bahrain) Al-Najma SC
- Third place: (Kuwait) Qadsia SC
- Fourth place: (Qatar) Al-Arabi SC

Tournament statistics
- Matches played: 20
- Goals scored: 1,095 (54.75 per match)

‌The 2022 Asian Club League Handball Championship was the 24th edition of the championship held from 22 to 30 June 2022 at Hyderabad, India under the aegis of Asian Handball Federation. It was the second time in history that the championship was organised by the Handball Federation of India. It acted as the qualification tournament for the 2022 IHF Men's Super Globe, with top team from the championship directly qualifying for the event to be held in Dammam, Saudi Arabia.

== Group A ==
| Pos | Team | Pld | W | D | L | GF | GA | GD | Pts | Qualification |
|---|---|---|---|---|---|---|---|---|---|---|
| 1 | (Kuwait) Qadsia SC | 3 | 2 | 1 | 0 | 90 | 69 | +21 | 5 | Semifinals |
| 2 | (Qatar) Al-Arabi SC | 3 | 2 | 0 | 1 | 83 | 67 | +16 | 4 | Semifinals |
| 3 | (Saudi Arabia) Al-Noor Club | 3 | 1 | 1 | 1 | 93 | 91 | +2 | 3 | 5–8th place semifinals |
| 4 | (India) T-Sports Club | 3 | 0 | 0 | 3 | 76 | 115 | −39 | 0 | 5–8th place semifinals |

Updated to match(es) played on 24 June 2022. Source: AHF

| 22 June 2022; 16:00 | Al-Noor Club (Saudi Arabia) | 24–29 | (Qatar) Al-Arabi SC | G. M. C. Balayogi Indoor Stadium, Hyderabad |
| 22 June 2022; 16:00 | | (13–14) | | G. M. C. Balayogi Indoor Stadium, Hyderabad |
| 22 June 2022; 16:00 | | Report | | G. M. C. Balayogi Indoor Stadium, Hyderabad |

| 22 June 2022; 18:00 | T-Sports Club (India) | 24–37 | (Kuwait) Qadsia SC | G. M. C. Balayogi Indoor Stadium, Hyderabad |
| 22 June 2022; 18:00 | | (12–18) | | G. M. C. Balayogi Indoor Stadium, Hyderabad |
| 22 June 2022; 18:00 | | Report | | G. M. C. Balayogi Indoor Stadium, Hyderabad |

| 24 June 2022; 16:00 | Qadsia SC (Kuwait) | 29–29 | (Saudi Arabia) Al-Noor Club | G. M. C. Balayogi Indoor Stadium, Hyderabad |
| 24 June 2022; 16:00 | | (15–12) | | G. M. C. Balayogi Indoor Stadium, Hyderabad |
| 24 June 2022; 16:00 | | Report | | G. M. C. Balayogi Indoor Stadium, Hyderabad |

| 24 June 2022; 18:00 | Al-Arabi SC (Qatar) | 38–19 | (India) T-Sports Club | G. M. C. Balayogi Indoor Stadium, Hyderabad |
| 24 June 2022; 18:00 | | (18–8) | | G. M. C. Balayogi Indoor Stadium, Hyderabad |
| 24 June 2022; 18:00 | | Report | | G. M. C. Balayogi Indoor Stadium, Hyderabad |

| 26 June 2022; 16:00 | Al-Arabi SC (Qatar) | 16–24 | (Kuwait) Qadsia SC | G. M. C. Balayogi Indoor Stadium, Hyderabad |
| 26 June 2022; 16:00 | | (8–11) | | G. M. C. Balayogi Indoor Stadium, Hyderabad |
| 26 June 2022; 16:00 | | Report | | G. M. C. Balayogi Indoor Stadium, Hyderabad |

| 26 June 2022; 18:00 | T-Sports Club (India) | 33–40 | (Saudi Arabia) Al-Noor Club | G. M. C. Balayogi Indoor Stadium, Hyderabad |
| 26 June 2022; 18:00 | | (15–21) | | G. M. C. Balayogi Indoor Stadium, Hyderabad |
| 26 June 2022; 18:00 | | Report | | G. M. C. Balayogi Indoor Stadium, Hyderabad |

== Group B ==
| Pos | Team | Pld | W | D | L | GF | GA | GD | Pts | Qualification |
|---|---|---|---|---|---|---|---|---|---|---|
| 1 | (Bahrain) Al-Najma SC | 3 | 2 | 1 | 0 | 85 | 78 | +7 | 5 | Semifinals |
| 2 | Al-Kuwait SC | 3 | 2 | 0 | 1 | 92 | 70 | +22 | 4 | Semifinals |
| 3 | (Qatar) Al-Wakrah SC | 3 | 1 | 1 | 1 | 72 | 79 | −7 | 3 | 5–8th place semifinals |
| 4 | (Iran) Sanat Mes Kerman | 3 | 0 | 0 | 3 | 64 | 86 | −22 | 0 | 5–8th place semifinals |

Source: AHF

| 23 June 2022; 16:00 | Al-Najma SC (Bahrain) | 31–25 | (Iran) Sanat Mes Kerman | G. M. C. Balayogi Indoor Stadium, Hyderabad |
| 23 June 2022; 16:00 | | (14–10) | | G. M. C. Balayogi Indoor Stadium, Hyderabad |
| 23 June 2022; 16:00 | | Report | | G. M. C. Balayogi Indoor Stadium, Hyderabad |

| 23 June 2022; 18:00 | Al-Kuwait SC | 33–23 | (Qatar) Al-Wakrah SC | G. M. C. Balayogi Indoor Stadium, Hyderabad |
| 23 June 2022; 18:00 | | (17–10) | | G. M. C. Balayogi Indoor Stadium, Hyderabad |
| 23 June 2022; 18:00 | | Report | | G. M. C. Balayogi Indoor Stadium, Hyderabad |

| 25 June 2022; 16:00 | Al-Wakrah SC (Qatar) | 25–22 | (Iran) Sanat Mes Kerman | G. M. C. Balayogi Indoor Stadium, Hyderabad |
| 25 June 2022; 16:00 | | (10–11) | | G. M. C. Balayogi Indoor Stadium, Hyderabad |
| 25 June 2022; 16:00 | | Report | | G. M. C. Balayogi Indoor Stadium, Hyderabad |

| 25 June 2022; 18:00 | Al-Najma SC (Bahrain) | 30–29 | Al-Kuwait SC | G. M. C. Balayogi Indoor Stadium, Hyderabad |
| 25 June 2022; 18:00 | | (15–14) | | G. M. C. Balayogi Indoor Stadium, Hyderabad |
| 25 June 2022; 18:00 | | Report | | G. M. C. Balayogi Indoor Stadium, Hyderabad |

| 27 June 2022; 16:00 | Al-Najma SC (Bahrain) | 24–24 | (Qatar) Al-Wakrah SC | G. M. C. Balayogi Indoor Stadium, Hyderabad |
| 27 June 2022; 16:00 | | (9–9) | | G. M. C. Balayogi Indoor Stadium, Hyderabad |
| 27 June 2022; 16:00 | | Report | | G. M. C. Balayogi Indoor Stadium, Hyderabad |

| 27 June 2022; 18:00 | Al-Kuwait SC | 30–17 | (Iran) Sanat Mes Kerman | G. M. C. Balayogi Indoor Stadium, Hyderabad |
| 27 June 2022; 18:00 | | (16–11) | | G. M. C. Balayogi Indoor Stadium, Hyderabad |
| 27 June 2022; 18:00 | | Report | | G. M. C. Balayogi Indoor Stadium, Hyderabad |

== Knockout stage ==
=== Bracket ===
Semifinals
A1 | (Kuwait) Qadsia SC | 20
B2 | Al-Kuwait SC | 25
B1 | (Bahrain) Al-Najma SC | 22
A2 | (Qatar) Al-Arabi SC | 21

Finals
B2 | Al-Kuwait SC | 28
B1 | (Bahrain) Al-Najma SC | 23
Third place
A1 | (Kuwait) Qadsia SC | 28
A2 | (Qatar) Al-Arabi SC | 27

5–8th place semifinals
A3 | (Saudi Arabia) Al-Noor Club | 34
B4 | (Iran) Sanat Mes Kerman | 31
B3 | (Qatar) Al-Wakrah SC | 38
A4 | (India) T-Sports Club | 28

Fifth place
A3 | (Saudi Arabia) Al-Noor Club | 24
B3 | (Qatar) Al-Wakrah SC | 30
Seventh place
B4 | (Iran) Sanat Mes Kerman | 33
A4 | (India) T-Sports Club | 28

=== 5–8th place semifinals ===
| 29 June 2022; 14:00 | Al-Noor Club (Saudi Arabia) | 34–31 | (Iran) Sanat Mes Kerman | G. M. C. Balayogi Indoor Stadium, Hyderabad |
| 29 June 2022; 14:00 | | (14–16) | | G. M. C. Balayogi Indoor Stadium, Hyderabad |
| 29 June 2022; 14:00 | | Report | | G. M. C. Balayogi Indoor Stadium, Hyderabad |

| 29 June 2022; 16:00 | Al-Wakrah SC (Qatar) | 38–28 | (India) T-Sports Club | G. M. C. Balayogi Indoor Stadium, Hyderabad |
| 29 June 2022; 16:00 | | (15–11) | | G. M. C. Balayogi Indoor Stadium, Hyderabad |
| 29 June 2022; 16:00 | | Report | | G. M. C. Balayogi Indoor Stadium, Hyderabad |

=== Semifinals ===
| 29 June 2022; 18:00 | Qadsia SC (Kuwait) | 20–25 | Al-Kuwait SC | G. M. C. Balayogi Indoor Stadium, Hyderabad |
| 29 June 2022; 18:00 | | (9–11) | | G. M. C. Balayogi Indoor Stadium, Hyderabad |
| 29 June 2022; 18:00 | | Report | | G. M. C. Balayogi Indoor Stadium, Hyderabad |

| 29 June 2022; 20:00 | Al-Najma SC (Bahrain) | 22–21 | (Qatar) Al-Arabi SC | G. M. C. Balayogi Indoor Stadium, Hyderabad |
| 29 June 2022; 20:00 | | (11–11) | | G. M. C. Balayogi Indoor Stadium, Hyderabad |
| 29 June 2022; 20:00 | | Report | | G. M. C. Balayogi Indoor Stadium, Hyderabad |

=== Seventh place game ===
| 30 June 2022; 12:00 | Sanat Mes Kerman (Iran) | 33–28 | (India) T-Sports Club | G. M. C. Balayogi Indoor Stadium, Hyderabad |
| 30 June 2022; 12:00 | | (15–15) | | G. M. C. Balayogi Indoor Stadium, Hyderabad |
| 30 June 2022; 12:00 | | Report | | G. M. C. Balayogi Indoor Stadium, Hyderabad |

=== Fifth place game ===
| 30 June 2022; 14:00 | Al-Noor Club (Saudi Arabia) | 24–30 | (Qatar) Al-Wakrah SC | G. M. C. Balayogi Indoor Stadium, Hyderabad |
| 30 June 2022; 14:00 | | (12–15) | | G. M. C. Balayogi Indoor Stadium, Hyderabad |
| 30 June 2022; 14:00 | | Report | | G. M. C. Balayogi Indoor Stadium, Hyderabad |

=== Third place game ===
| 30 June 2022; 16:00 | Qadsia SC (Kuwait) | 28–27 | (Qatar) Al-Arabi SC | G. M. C. Balayogi Indoor Stadium, Hyderabad |
| 30 June 2022; 16:00 | | (16–12) | | G. M. C. Balayogi Indoor Stadium, Hyderabad |
| 30 June 2022; 16:00 | | Report | | G. M. C. Balayogi Indoor Stadium, Hyderabad |

=== Final ===
| 30 June 2022; 18:00 | Al-Kuwait SC | 28–23 | (Bahrain) Al-Najma SC | G. M. C. Balayogi Indoor Stadium, Hyderabad |
| 30 June 2022; 18:00 | | (15–11) | | G. M. C. Balayogi Indoor Stadium, Hyderabad |
| 30 June 2022; 18:00 | | Report | | G. M. C. Balayogi Indoor Stadium, Hyderabad |

== Final standings ==
| Rank | Team |
|---|---|
| 1st place, gold medalist(s) | Al-Kuwait SC |
| 2nd place, silver medalist(s) | (Bahrain) Al-Najma |
| 3rd place, bronze medalist(s) | (Kuwait) Qadsia SC |
| 4 | (Qatar) Al-Arabi SC |
| 5 | (Qatar) Al-Wakrah SC |
| 6 | (Saudi Arabia) Al-Noor Club |
| 7 | (Iran) Sanat Mes Kerman |
| 8 | (India) T-Sports Club |

| Team qualified for the 2022 IHF Men's Super Globe |
