= Kuwait SC (handball) =

Kuwaiti handball club

Al Kuwait SC Handball
- Full name: Al-Kuwait SC
- Founded: 1966
- Arena: Kuwait Sports Hall
- Capacity: 500
- President: (Kuwait) Khalid Al-Ghanim
- Head coach: (Algeria) Saïd Hadjazi
- League: Kuwait Handball League
- 2024-25: 1st
- Club colours
Home	Away

Kuwait SC active departments
'Football (men's)	Handball (men's)	Basketball (men's)

Al Kuwait Handball Club (Arabic: نادي الكويت لكرة اليد) is one of Kuwait Sporting Club's sections that represent the club locally as well as in international handball competitions.

Al-Kuwait SC is most decorated team in Kuwait including 15 league titles and 15 federation cups. Internationally, the club also won one Gulf title, three Arab titles and one Asian title and qualified to Super Globe twice in 2022 and 2023. The club also had the longest winning run in Kuwait with 169 games from 2013 until 2020.

== Honours ==
=== National competitions ===
Kuwait Handball League

- Champions (15): 1970/1971, 1974/1975, 2012/2013, 2013/2014, 2014/2015, 2015/2016, 2016/2017, 2017/2018, 2018/2019, 2019/2020, 2020/2021, 2021/2022, 2022/2023, 2023/2024, 2024/25

Kuwaiti Handball Federation Cup

- Champions (15): 1969, 1970, 2012, 2014, 2015, 2016, 2017, 2018, 2019, 2020, 2021, 2022, 2023, 2024, 2025

Kuwaiti Super Cup

- Champions (4): 2020, 2021, 2024, 2026

=== International competitions ===
Gulf Champions Club Tournament

- Champions (1): 2023

Arab Handball Championship of Champions

- Champions (3): 2023, 2024, 2025
- Runners-up (1): 2012
- Third Place (1): 2022

Asian Club League Handball Championship

- Champions (1): 2022
- Runners-up (1): 2021
- Third Place (1): 2012

== Al-Kuwait SC in Super Globe ==
Kuwait SC qualified to the Super Globe twice in 2022 and 2023.

=== 2022 IHF Super Globe ===
On 30 June 2022, Al-Kuwait SC qualified to the Super Globe after defeating Al-Najma 28–23 in the 2022 Asian Men's Club League Handball Championship final.

Group C

Pos	Team	Pld	W	D	L	GF	GA	GD	Pts	Qualification
1	(Poland) Łomża Industria Kielce	2	2	0	0	86	56	+30	4	Semifinals
2	(Brazil) Handebol Taubaté	2	1	0	1	62	67	−5	2	5–8th place semifinals
3	Al-Kuwait SC	2	0	0	2	54	79	−25	0	9–12th place semifinals

Source: IHF
Rules for classification: 1) points; 2) head-to-head points; 3) head-to-head goal difference; 4) head-to-head number of goals scored; 5) goal difference.

18 October 2022; 11:30	Handebol Taubaté (Brazil)	32–28	Al-Kuwait SC	Dammam Sports Hall, Dammam; Attendance: 250; Referees: Hansen, Lah, Brunner
18 October 2022; 11:30	Perrella Filho 6	(19–12)	Saleh 7	Dammam Sports Hall, Dammam; Attendance: 250; Referees: Hansen, Lah, Brunner
18 October 2022; 11:30	2× (suspension)	Report	1× (yellow card) 1× (suspension)	Dammam Sports Hall, Dammam; Attendance: 250; Referees: Hansen, Lah, Brunner

19 October 2022; 12:15	Al-Kuwait SC	26–47	(Poland) Łomża Industria Kielce	Dammam Sports Hall, Dammam; Attendance: 182; Referees: Milošević, Schulze, Koo
19 October 2022; 12:15	Hernández 6	(14–23)	Tournat 9	Dammam Sports Hall, Dammam; Attendance: 182; Referees: Milošević, Schulze, Koo
19 October 2022; 12:15	2× (suspension)	Report	1× (suspension)	Dammam Sports Hall, Dammam; Attendance: 182; Referees: Milošević, Schulze, Koo

Knockout stage 9–12th place bracket

9–12th place semifinals
22 October
(Australia) Sydney University	26
(Saudi Arabia) Mudhar	29
22 October
Al-Kuwait SC	41
(Mexico) Club Ministros	26

Ninth place game
23 October
(Saudi Arabia) Mudhar	18
Al-Kuwait SC	34
Eleventh place game
23 October
(Australia) Sydney University	33
(Mexico) Club Ministros	29

9–12th place semifinals

22 October 2022; 11:30	Al-Kuwait SC	41–26	(Mexico) Club Ministros	Dammam Sports Hall, Dammam; Attendance: 550; Referees: Koo, Lee (KOR)
22 October 2022; 11:30	Saleh 12	(18–12)	Sánchez Haas 6	Dammam Sports Hall, Dammam; Attendance: 550; Referees: Koo, Lee (KOR)
22 October 2022; 11:30	1× (suspension)	Report	2× (suspension)	Dammam Sports Hall, Dammam; Attendance: 550; Referees: Koo, Lee (KOR)

Ninth place game

23 October 2022; 11:30	Mudhar (Saudi Arabia)	18–34	Al-Kuwait SC	Dammam Sports Hall, Dammam; Attendance: 200; Referees: Madsen, Hansen (DEN)
23 October 2022; 11:30	Bannour 5	(5–20)	Saleh 16	Dammam Sports Hall, Dammam; Attendance: 200; Referees: Madsen, Hansen (DEN)
23 October 2022; 11:30	1× (suspension)	Report		Dammam Sports Hall, Dammam; Attendance: 200; Referees: Madsen, Hansen (DEN)

=== 2023 IHF Super Globe ===
On 27 August 2023, Al-Kuwait SC defeated Zamalek SC 31–30 in the 2023 Arab Handball Championship of Champions final to qualify to the 2023 Super Globe hosted by Saudi Arabia.

=== Group B ===
Pos	Team	Pld	W	D	L	GF	GA	GD	Pts	Qualification
1	(Germany) Füchse Berlin	2	2	0	0	85	62	+23	4	Semifinals
2	Al-Kuwait SC	2	1	0	1	69	66	+3	2	5–8th place semifinals
3	(Argentina) San Fernando HB	2	0	0	2	63	89	−26	0	9–12th place semifinals

Source: IHF
Rules for classification: 1) points; 2) head-to-head points; 3) head-to-head goal difference; 4) head-to-head number of goals scored; 5) goal difference.

7 November 2023; 13:45	Al-Kuwait SC	41–29	(Argentina) San Fernando HB	Dammam Sports Hall, Dammam; Attendance: 250; Referees: Horáček, Novotný (CZE)
7 November 2023; 13:45	Saleh 7	(19–15)	J. Fernández 8	Dammam Sports Hall, Dammam; Attendance: 250; Referees: Horáček, Novotný (CZE)
7 November 2023; 13:45	2× (suspension)	Report	3× (suspension)	Dammam Sports Hall, Dammam; Attendance: 250; Referees: Horáček, Novotný (CZE)

9 November 2023; 14:30	Al-Kuwait SC	28–37	(Germany) Füchse Berlin	Dammam Sports Hall, Dammam; Attendance: 300; Referees: Kleven, Jørum (NOR)
9 November 2023; 14:30	Carol, Saleh 5	(16–18)	Gidsel 13	Dammam Sports Hall, Dammam; Attendance: 300; Referees: Kleven, Jørum (NOR)
9 November 2023; 14:30	2× (suspension)	Report	3× (suspension)	Dammam Sports Hall, Dammam; Attendance: 300; Referees: Kleven, Jørum (NOR)

=== 5–8th place bracket ===
5–8th place semifinals
11 November
(Egypt) Al Ahly	35
Al-Kuwait SC	25
11 November
(Saudi Arabia) Khaleej Club	27
(Bahrain) Al-Najma	24

Fifth place game
12 November
(Egypt) Al Ahly (Pen.)	30 (5)
(Saudi Arabia) Khaleej Club	30 (4)
Seventh place game
12 November
Al-Kuwait SC	29
(Bahrain) Al-Najma	24

==== 5–8th place semifinals ====
11 November 2023; 13:15	Al Ahly (Egypt)	35–25	Al-Kuwait SC	Ministry of Sports Hall, Dammam; Attendance: 800; Referees: Gasmi, Gasmi (FRA)
11 November 2023; 13:15	Hesham, Ramadan 6	(16–12)	Carol 9	Ministry of Sports Hall, Dammam; Attendance: 800; Referees: Gasmi, Gasmi (FRA)
11 November 2023; 13:15	3× (suspension)	Report	1× (yellow card) 4× (suspension) 1× (red card)	Ministry of Sports Hall, Dammam; Attendance: 800; Referees: Gasmi, Gasmi (FRA)

==== Seventh place game ====
12 November 2023; 13:15	Al-Kuwait SC	29–24	(Bahrain) Al-Najma	Ministry of Sports Hall, Dammam; Attendance: 500; Referees: Lenci, Grillo (ARG)
12 November 2023; 13:15	Carol 9	(15–11)	Madan 5	Ministry of Sports Hall, Dammam; Attendance: 500; Referees: Lenci, Grillo (ARG)
12 November 2023; 13:15	1× (suspension)	Report	1× (yellow card) 2× (suspension)	Ministry of Sports Hall, Dammam; Attendance: 500; Referees: Lenci, Grillo (ARG)

== See also ==
- Kuwait SC
- Kuwait SC (basketball)
