= 2016 Asian Men's Club League Handball Championship =

Asian Handball Championship League 2016

- Logo of 19th AHF Asian Men's Club League Handball Championship

Tournament details
- Host country: Jordan
- Venue(s): 1 (in 1 host city)
- Dates: 29 October - 5 November 2016
- Teams: 8 (from 1 confederation)

Final positions
- Champions: (Saudi Arabia) Al-Noor Club (1st title)
- Runner-up: (Qatar) El-Jaish SC
- Third place: (Qatar) Lekhwiya SC
- Fourth place: (Iran) Gachsaran Oil & Gas Club

Tournament statistics
- Matches played: 20
- Goals scored: 1,115 (55.75 per match)

‌The 2016 Asian Men's Club League Handball Championship was the 19th edition of the Asian Club League Handball Championship held under the aegis of Asian Handball Federation.The championship was hosted by Al-Ahli Sports Club in Amman (Jordan) from 29 October to 5 November 2016. Al-Noor Club of Saudi Arabia won the championship by beating two times champion El-Jaish Sports Club of Qatar in the final match by 25-23. Defending Champion Lekhwiya Sports Club of Qatar managed to get bronze medal after beating Gachsaran Oil & Gas Club of Islamic Republic of Iran by 31-21. It is the official competition for men's handball clubs of Asia crowning the Asian champions. The winner of the championship qualified for the 2017 IHF Super Globe.

== Draw ==
Group A	Group B
(Jordan) Al-Ahli SC	(Qatar) Lekhwiya SC
(Iran) Gachsaran Oil & Gas Club	(Bahrain) Al-Ahli Club
(United Arab Emirates) Al Jazira Club	(Saudi Arabia) Al-Noor Club
(Qatar) El-Jaish SC	(Oman) Ahli Sidab Club

== Group A ==
Team	Pld	W	D	L	GF	GA	GD	Pts
(Qatar) El-Jaish SC	3	3	0	0	110	68	+42	6
(Iran) Gachsaran Oil & Gas Club	3	1	1	1	89	95	−6	3
(United Arab Emirates) Al Jazira Club	3	1	1	1	89	101	−12	3
(Jordan) Al-Ahli SC	3	0	0	3	69	93	−24	0

29 October 2016; 13:00	Gachsaran Oil & Gas Club (Iran)	35-35	(United Arab Emirates) Al Jazira Club	Amman, Jordan
29 October 2016; 13:00		(13-15)		Amman, Jordan

29 October 2016; 17:00	Al-Ahli SC (Jordan)	17-36	(Qatar) El-Jaish SC	Amman, Jordan
29 October 2016; 17:00		(4-15)		Amman, Jordan

30 October 2016; 13:00	El-Jaish SC (Qatar)	37-28	(Iran) Gachsaran Oil & Gas Club	Amman, Jordan
30 October 2016; 13:00		(20-15)		Amman, Jordan

30 October 2016; 17:00	Al Jazira Club (United Arab Emirates)	31-29	(Jordan) Al-Ahli SC	Amman, Jordan
30 October 2016; 17:00		(15-13)		Amman, Jordan

1 November 2016; 13:00	Al Jazira Club (United Arab Emirates)	23-37	(Qatar) El-Jaish SC	Amman, Jordan
1 November 2016; 13:00		(12-16)		Amman, Jordan

1 November 2016; 17:00	Al-Ahli SC (Jordan)	23-26	(Iran) Gachsaran Oil & Gas Club	Amman, Jordan
1 November 2016; 17:00		(8-13)		Amman, Jordan

== Group B ==
Team	Pld	W	D	L	GF	GA	GD	Pts
(Saudi Arabia) Al-Noor Club	3	2	1	0	91	66	+25	5
(Qatar) Lekhwiya SC	3	2	0	1	89	78	+11	4
(Bahrain) Al-Ahli Club	3	1	1	1	83	71	+12	3
(Oman) Ahli Sidab Club	3	0	0	3	68	116	−48	0

29 October 2016; 15:00	Al-Ahli Club (Bahrain)	21-21	(Saudi Arabia) Al-Noor Club	Amman, Jordan
29 October 2016; 15:00		(11-11)		Amman, Jordan

29 October 2016; 19:00	Lekhwiya SC (Qatar)	38-24	(Oman) Ahli Sidab Club	Amman, Jordan
29 October 2016; 19:00		(18-15)		Amman, Jordan

30 October 2016; 15:00	Ahli Sidab Club (Oman)	22-37	(Bahrain) Al-Ahli Club	Amman, Jordan
30 October 2016; 15:00		(8-19)		Amman, Jordan

30 October 2016; 19:00	Al-Noor Club (Saudi Arabia)	29-23	(Qatar) Lekhwiya SC	Amman, Jordan
30 October 2016; 19:00		(15-9)		Amman, Jordan

1 November 2016; 15:00	Al-Noor Club (Saudi Arabia)	41-22	(Oman) Ahli Sidab Club	Amman, Jordan
1 November 2016; 15:00		(21-10)		Amman, Jordan

1 November 2016; 19:00	Lekhwiya SC (Qatar)	28-25	(Bahrain) Al-Ahli Club	Amman, Jordan
1 November 2016; 19:00		(15-10)		Amman, Jordan

== 5th–8th placement matches ==
3 November 2016; 13:00	Al Jazira Club (United Arab Emirates)	30-28	(Oman) Ahli Sidab Club	Amman, Jordan
3 November 2016; 13:00		(14-12)		Amman, Jordan

3 November 2016; 15:00	Al-Ahli Club (Bahrain)	24-25	(Jordan) Al-Ahli SC	Amman, Jordan
3 November 2016; 15:00		(11-16)		Amman, Jordan

=== 7th–8th-place match ===
4 November 2016; 15:00	Ahli Sidab Club (Oman)	26-42	(Bahrain) Al-Ahli Club	Amman, Jordan
4 November 2016; 15:00		(13-21)		Amman, Jordan

=== 5th–6th-place match ===
4 November 2016; 17:00	Al Jazira Club (United Arab Emirates)	24-19	(Jordan) Al-Ahli SC	Amman, Jordan
4 November 2016; 17:00		(9-12)		Amman, Jordan

== Semifinal matches ==
Semi-finals
3 November 2016
(Qatar) El-Jaish SC	28
(Qatar) Lekhwiya SC	20
3 November 2016
(Saudi Arabia) Al-Noor Club	35
(Iran) Gachsaran Oil & Gas Club	26

Final
5 November 2016
(Qatar) El-Jaish SC	23
(Saudi Arabia) Al-Noor Club	25
Third place
5 November 2016
(Qatar) Lekhwiya SC	31
(Iran) Gachsaran Oil & Gas Club	21

3 November 2016; 17:00	El-Jaish SC (Qatar)	28-20	(Qatar) Lekhwiya SC	Amman, Jordan
3 November 2016; 17:00		(14-11)		Amman, Jordan

3 November 2016; 19:00	Al-Noor Club (Saudi Arabia)	35-26	(Iran) Gachsaran Oil & Gas Club	Amman, Jordan
3 November 2016; 19:00		(19-15)		Amman, Jordan

=== Bronze-medal match ===
5 November 2016; 15:00	Lekhwiya SC (Qatar)	31-21	(Iran) Gachsaran Oil & Gas Club	Amman, Jordan
5 November 2016; 15:00		(13-12)		Amman, Jordan

=== Gold-medal match ===
5 November 2016; 17:00	El-Jaish SC (Qatar)	23-25	(Saudi Arabia) Al-Noor Club	Amman, Jordan
5 November 2016; 17:00		(10-11)		Amman, Jordan

== Final standings ==
Rank	Team
1st place, gold medalist(s)	(Saudi Arabia) Al-Noor Club (1st title)
2nd place, silver medalist(s)	(Qatar) El-Jaish SC
3rd place, bronze medalist(s)	(Qatar) Lekhwiya SC (Defending Champion)
4	(Iran) Gachsaran Oil & Gas Club
5	(United Arab Emirates) Al Jazira Club
6	(Jordan) Al-Ahli SC (Host)
7	(Bahrain) Al-Ahli Club
8	(Oman) Ahli Sidab Club

Team qualified for the 2017 IHF Super Globe
