= 2022 Arab Handball Championship of Champions =

Tournament details
- Host country: Tunisia
- Venue: 1 (in 1 host city)
- Dates: 17–27 September
- Teams: 8 (from 2 confederations)

Final positions
- Champions: (Tunisia) ES Tunis HC (7th title)
- Runners-up: (Egypt) Zamalek SC
- Third place: Al-Kuwait SC

The 2022 Arab Handball Championship of Champions is the 37th edition of the Arab Handball Championship of Champions which is for the first time a qualifying tournament for the 2022 IHF Men's Super Globe. It was held in Hammamet, Tunisia from 17 to 27 September 2022.

== Teams ==
Following teams were already qualified for the tournament.

Team	Qualified as
(Algeria) MC Alger	Representative of Algerian Handball Championship
(Algeria) ES Skikda	Representative of Algerian Handball Championship
(Egypt) Zamalek SC	Winner of 2021–22 Egyptian Handball League
Al-Kuwait SC	Winner of Kuwait Handball Premier League 2021–22
(Kuwait) Al-Salmiya SC	Third of Kuwait Handball Premier League 2021–22
(Tunisia) Club Africain HB	Winner of Tunisian Handball League 2021–22
(Tunisia) ES Tunis HC	Runner up of Tunisian Handball League 2021–22
(United Arab Emirates) Al-Sharjah	Winner of United Arab Emirates Handball League 2021–22

== Results ==
All times are local (UTC+1).

=== Group A ===
Pos	Team	Pld	W	D	L	GF	GA	GD	Pts
1	(Tunisia) Club Africain HB	3	2	0	1	68	52	+16	4
2	(United Arab Emirates) Al-Sharjah	3	2	0	1	61	52	+9	4
3	(Kuwait) Al-Salmiya SC	3	2	0	1	59	54	+5	4
4	(Algeria) ES Skikda	3	0	0	3	0	30	−30	0

Source: FTHB
Rules for classification: 1) points; 2) points in the games between teams in question; 3) goal difference in the games between teams in question; 4) number of goals scored in the games between teams in question; 5) goal difference; 6) number of goals scored.

17 September 2022	Al-Salmiya SC (Kuwait)	25–23	(United Arab Emirates) Al-Sharjah	Hammamet, Tunisia

17 September 2022	ES Skikda (Algeria)	0–10	(Tunisia) Club Africain HB	Hammamet, Tunisia
17 September 2022		(Forfeit)		Hammamet, Tunisia

18 September 2022	Club Africain HB (Tunisia)	31–24	(Kuwait) Al-Salmiya SC	Hammamet, Tunisia

18 September 2022	ES Skikda (Algeria)	0–10	(United Arab Emirates) Al-Sharjah	Hammamet, Tunisia
18 September 2022		(Forfeit)		Hammamet, Tunisia

20 September 2022	Club Africain HB (Tunisia)	27–28	(United Arab Emirates) Al-Sharjah	Hammamet, Tunisia

20 September 2022	ES Skikda (Algeria)	0–10	(Kuwait) Al-Salmiya SC	Hammamet, Tunisia
20 September 2022		(Forfeit)		Hammamet, Tunisia

=== Group B ===
Pos	Team	Pld	W	D	L	GF	GA	GD	Pts
1	(Egypt) Zamalek SC	3	3	0	0	88	74	+14	6
2	(Tunisia) ES Tunis HC	3	1	1	1	92	90	+2	3
3	Al-Kuwait SC	3	1	1	1	89	91	−2	3
4	(Algeria) MC Alger	3	0	0	3	82	96	−14	0

Source: FTHB
Rules for classification: 1) points; 2) points in the games between teams in question; 3) goal difference in the games between teams in question; 4) number of goals scored in the games between teams in question; 5) goal difference; 6) number of goals scored.

17 September 2022	Al-Kuwait SC	35–34	(Algeria) MC Alger	Hammamet, Tunisia

17 September 2022	ES Tunis HC (Tunisia)	28–34	(Egypt) Zamalek SC	Hammamet, Tunisia
17 September 2022		(13–16)		Hammamet, Tunisia

18 September 2022	ES Tunis HC (Tunisia)	30–22	(Algeria) MC Alger	Hammamet, Tunisia

18 September 2022	Zamalek SC (Egypt)	23–20	Al-Kuwait SC	Hammamet, Tunisia

20 September 2022	ES Tunis HC (Tunisia)	34–34	Al-Kuwait SC	Hammamet, Tunisia

20 September 2022	Zamalek SC (Egypt)	31–26	(Algeria) MC Alger	Hammamet, Tunisia

== Knockout stage ==
=== Bracket ===
Quarter-finals
22 September
(Tunisia) Club Africain HB	32
(Algeria) MC Alger	27
22 September
(Tunisia) ES Tunis HC	35
(Kuwait) Al-Salmiya SC	25
22 September
(United Arab Emirates) Al-Sharjah	26
Al-Kuwait SC	30
22 September
(Egypt) Zamalek SC	10
(Algeria) ES Skikda	0

Semi-finals
25 September
(Tunisia) Club Africain HB	22
(Tunisia) ES Tunis HC	28
25 September
Al-Kuwait SC	25
(Egypt) Zamalek SC	31

Final
27 September
(Tunisia) ES Tunis HC	29
(Egypt) Zamalek SC	28
Third place
27 September
(Tunisia) Club Africain HB	30
Al-Kuwait SC	33

=== Quarterfinals ===
22 September 2022	Club Africain HB (Tunisia)	32–27	(Algeria) MC Alger	Hammamet, Tunisia

22 September 2022	ES Tunis HC (Tunisia)	35–25	(Kuwait) Al-Salmiya SC	Hammamet, Tunisia

22 September 2022	Al-Sharjah (United Arab Emirates)	26–30	Al-Kuwait SC	Hammamet, Tunisia

22 September 2022	Zamalek SC (Egypt)	10–0 (Forfeit)	(Algeria) ES Skikda	Hammamet, Tunisia

=== Semifinals ===
25 September 2022	Club Africain HB (Tunisia)	22–28	(Tunisia) ES Tunis HC	Hammamet, Tunisia

25 September 2022	Al-Kuwait SC	25–31	(Egypt) Zamalek SC	Hammamet, Tunisia

=== Seventh place game ===
27 September 2022	Al-Salmiya SC (Kuwait)	10–0	(Algeria) ES Skikda	Hammamet, Tunisia
27 September 2022		(Forfait)		Hammamet, Tunisia

=== Fifth place game ===
27 September 2022	Al-Sharjah (United Arab Emirates)	34–20	(Algeria) MC Alger	Hammamet, Tunisia

=== Third place game ===
27 September 2022; 15:00	Club Africain HB (Tunisia)	30–33	Al-Kuwait SC	Hammamet, Tunisia

=== Final ===
27 September 2022
17:30
ES Tunis HC (Tunisia)
29–28
(Egypt) Zamalek SC
Hammamet, Tunisia

FT: 25–25

== Final standing ==
Rank	Team
1st place, gold medalist(s)	(Tunisia) ES Tunis HC
2nd place, silver medalist(s)	(Egypt) Zamalek SC
3rd place, bronze medalist(s)	Al-Kuwait SC
4	(Tunisia) Club Africain HB
5	(United Arab Emirates) Al-Sharjah
6	(Algeria) MC Alger
7	(Kuwait) Al-Salmiya SC
8	(Algeria) ES Skikda

Team qualified to the 2022 IHF Men's Super Globe
