= Ahmed Al-Abdulali =

Saudi Arabian handball player

Personal information
- Nationality: Saudi Arabian
- Born: 18 June 1988 (age 38)
- Height: 1.82 m (6 ft 0 in)

Sport
- Sport: Handball
- Position: Right wing
- Current club: Mudhar
- Number: 15
National team
Years	Team	Apps	(Gls)
–	Saudi Arabia	127	(310)

Ahmed Al-Abdulali (born 18 June 1988) is a Saudi Arabian handball player for Mudhar and the Saudi Arabia national team.
