= Amine Bannour =

Tunisian handball player (born 1990)

Personal information
- Nationality: Tunisian
- Born: 21 February 1990 (age 36) Mahdia, Tunisia
- Height: 1.97 m (6 ft 6 in)

Sport
- Sport: Handball
- Position: Right back
- Current club: Mudhar
- Number: 9
National team
Years	Team	Apps	(Gls)
2010–	Tunisia	112	(340)
Medal record
African Championship
Gold medal – first place	2012 Morocco
Gold medal – first place	2018 Gabon
Silver medal – second place	2020 Tunisia
Mediterranean Games
Silver medal – second place	2018 Tarragona	Team
Pan Arab Games
Bronze medal – third place	2011 Qatar
Junior World Championship
Bronze medal – third place	2011 Greece

Amine Bannour (born 21 February 1990) is a Tunisian handball player for Saudi Arabian club Mudhar and the Tunisia national team.

== Achievements ==
- IHF Super Globe:
  - Finalist: 2014
- African Champions League:
  - Winner: 2014
  - Third place: 2013
- African Supercup:
  - Winner: 2015
- Arab Championship of Champions:
  - Winner: 2012
- Tunisian League:
  - Winner: 2015
- Tunisian Cup:
  - Winner: 2011, 2015, 2016
- Romanian League:
  - Winner: 2019, 2022
- Romanian Supercup:
  - Winner: 2018, 2019
- African Championship:
  - Gold Medalist: 2012, 2018
- Pan Arab Games:
  - Bronze Medalist: 2011
- Junior World Championship:
  - Bronze Medalist: 2011

== Individual awards ==
- IHF Super Globe Top Scorer: 2012
- All-Star Right Back of the African Championship: 2012
- All-Star Right Back of the Liga Națională: 2019
- Liga Națională Foreign Player of the Season: 2019
