= Frankis Carol =

Qatari handball player (born 1987)

Personal information
- Full name: Frankis Carol Marzo
- Nationality: Qatari; Cuban
- Born: 7 September 1987 (age 39) Guantánamo, Cuba
- Height: 1.91 m (6 ft 3 in)

Sport
- Sport: Handball
- Position: Left back
- Current club: Kuwait SC
- Number: 13

Senior clubs
- Years: Team
- 2005–2011: FC Matanzas
- 2011–2021: Sporting CP
- 2021: Al Arabi SC
- 2021–: Kuwait SC
National team
Years	Team		
2007–2017	Cuba		
2017–	Qatar	39	(235)
Medal record
Men's handball
Representing Qatar
Asian Games
Gold medal – first place	2018 Jakarta	Team
Gold medal – first place	2022 Hangzhou	Team
Silver medal – second place	2026 Aichi–Nagoya	Team
Asian Championship
Gold medal – first place	2018 South Korea
Gold medal – first place	2020 Kuwait
Gold medal – first place	2022 Saudi Arabia
Gold medal – first place	2024 Bahrain
Silver medal – second place	2026 Kuwait
Representing Cuba
Pan American Games
Gold medal – first place	2007 Rio de Janeiro	Team
Pan American Championship
Gold medal – first place	2008 Brazil
- Updated on 8 February 2024

Frankis Carol Marzo (born 7 September 1987) is a Cuban-born Qatari handball player for Kuwait SC and the Qatar national team.

He represented Qatar at the 2019 World Men's Handball Championship. He later played at the 2021 World Men's Handball Championship, where he finished as top scorer with 58 goals.

== Achievements ==
=== Club ===
Sporting CP

- Portuguese First Division:
  - Winner: 2017, 2018

=== Individual ===
- World Men's Handball Championship Top Scorer: 2021
