= 2012 Arab Handball Championship of Champions =

Prince Faisal bin Fahd Handball Championship of Arab Club Champions

Tournament details
- Host country: Morocco
- City: Berkane
- Dates: 2 – 12 October 2012
- Teams: 17 (from 2 confederations)

Final positions
- Champions: (Tunisia) Club Africain (2nd title)
- Runners-up: Kuwait SC

The 2012 Arab Handball Championship of Champions Club officially named Prince Faisal bin Fahd Handball Championship for Arab Club Champions was the 29th edition of Arab world's premier club handball tournament held in Berkane, Morocco. Al Ahly SC is the defending champion.

== Group stage ==
=== Group A ===
Team	Pld	W	D	L	GF	GA	GD	Pts
(Saudi Arabia) Al-Wehda Club	4	4	0	0	144	120	+24	8
Kuwait SC	4	3	0	1	139	98	+41	6
(Algeria) CRBEE Alger-centre	4	2	0	2	130	108	+22	4
(Libya) Ittihad Alamn Alaam	4	1	0	3	96	114	−18	2
(Palestine) Khadamat Al-Nuseirat	4	0	0	4	78	147	−69	0

=== Group B ===
Team	Pld	W	D	L	GF	GA	GD	Pts
(Bahrain) Barbar Club	3	3	0	0	101	85	+16	6
(Morocco) RS Berkane	3	2	0	1	87	79	+8	4
(Algeria) NR Chelghoum Laïd	3	1	0	2	86	94	−8	2
(Iraq) Najaf SC	3	0	0	3	82	98	−16	0

=== Group C ===
Team	Pld	W	D	L	GF	GA	GD	Pts
(Tunisia) Club Africain	3	3	0	0	83	50	+33	6
(Kuwait) Al-Arabi SC	3	1	1	1	81	83	−2	3
(Libya) Al-Najma SC	3	1	0	2	62	82	−20	2
(Iraq) Naft Al Junoob SC	3	0	1	2	67	78	−11	1

=== Group D ===
Team	Pld	W	D	L	GF	GA	GD	Pts
(Egypt) Al Ahly SC	3	3	0	0	96	50	+46	6
(Qatar) Al-Gharafa SC	3	2	0	1	90	71	+19	4
(Iraq) Al-Karkh SC	3	1	0	2	79	77	+2	2
(Palestine) El-Salah IA	3	0	0	3	58	125	−67	0

== Knockout stage ==
Quarter-finals
8 October – Berkane
(Saudi Arabia) Al-Wehda Club	36
(Morocco) RS Berkane	33
8 October – Berkane
(Bahrain) Barbar Club	26
Kuwait SC	37
8 October – Berkane
(Tunisia) Club Africain	30
(Qatar) Al-Gharafa SC	22
8 October – Berkane
(Egypt) Al Ahly SC	32
(Kuwait) Al-Arabi SC	26

Semi-finals
10 October – Berkane
(Saudi Arabia) Al-Wehda Club	28
Kuwait SC	30
10 October – Berkane
(Tunisia) Club Africain	27
(Egypt) Al Ahly SC	26

Final
12 October – Berkane
Kuwait SC	28
(Tunisia) Club Africain	33

=== Quarterfinals ===
8 October 2012; 14:00	Al-Wehda Club (Saudi Arabia)	36 – 33	(Morocco) RS Berkane	..., Berkane
8 October 2012; 14:00		(18–13)		..., Berkane

8 October 2012; 16:00	Barbar Club (Bahrain)	26 – 37	Kuwait SC	..., Berkane
8 October 2012; 16:00		(11–18)		..., Berkane

8 October 2012; 18:00	Club Africain (Tunisia)	30 – 22	(Qatar) Al-Gharafa SC	..., Berkane
8 October 2012; 18:00		(13–13)		..., Berkane

8 October 2012; 20:00	Al Ahly SC (Egypt)	32 – 26	(Kuwait) Al-Arabi SC	..., Berkane
8 October 2012; 20:00		(16–10)		..., Berkane

=== Semifinals ===
10 October 2012; 18:00	Al-Wehda Club (Saudi Arabia)	28 – 30	(Kuwait) Al-Arabi SC	..., Berkane
10 October 2012; 18:00		(15–17)		..., Berkane

10 October 2012; 20:00	Club Africain (Tunisia)	27 – 26	(Egypt) Al Ahly SC	..., Berkane
10 October 2012; 20:00		(12–12)		..., Berkane

=== Final ===
12 October 2012; 18:00	Kuwait SC	28 – 33	(Tunisia) Club Africain	..., Berkane
12 October 2012; 18:00		(13–19)		..., Berkane
