= Arab Handball Championship of Champions =

Handball competition of the Arab World

- Founded: 1976
- Country: Arab World
- Confederation: AHF
- Most recent champion: Al-Kuwait SC (2025)
- Most titles: (Tunisia) ES Tunis HC (7 Titles)
- 2025 Arab Club Championship

Arab Handball Championship of Champions Club is an international club handball competition organized by the Arab Handball Federation for champions of the Arab World countries.

== Results ==
#	Year	Host	Final			Third place match		
#	Year	Host	Champion	Score	Second place	Third place	Score	Fourth place
1	1976; Details	(Egypt); Alexandria	(Tunisia); ES Tunis	13 – 7	(Egypt); Smouha	(Syria); Security Force Club	–	
2	1977; Details	(Libya); Derna	(Tunisia); ES Tunis	–	(Libya); Al-Aouras Club	(Palestine); Al-Quds Club	–	
3	1978; Details	(Syria); Damascus	(Tunisia); ES Tunis	–	(Saudi Arabia); Al-Ittihad Jeddah	(Syria); Security Force Club	–	
4	1979; Details	(Tunisia); Tunis	(Tunisia); ES Tunis	–	(Saudi Arabia); Al-Ahli SC	(Kuwait); Qadsia SC	–	
5	1980; Details	(Bahrain); Manama	(Saudi Arabia); Al-Ahli SC	–	(Tunisia); ES Tunis	(Libya); Al-Ittihad Tripoli	–	
6	1981; Details	(Jordan); Amman	(United Arab Emirates); Al Ain SC	–	(Tunisia); CS Hammam-Lif	(Saudi Arabia); Al-Ahli SC	–	
–	1982	Syria	Not held because the 1982 Lebanon War					
8	1983; Details	(Algeria); Algiers	(Algeria); MC Oran	21 – 18	(Saudi Arabia); Al-Khaleej Club	(Syria); Al-Jamahir Club	31 – 27 (ET)	(Bahrain); Al-Wahda SC
9	1984; Details	(Saudi Arabia); Dammam	(Algeria); MC Oran	15 – 13	(Saudi Arabia); Al-Khaleej Club	(Kuwait); Qadsia SC	29 – 26	(Iraq); Al-Jaish SC
10	1985; Details	(Syria); Damascus	(Algeria); Nadit Alger	28 – 22	(Saudi Arabia); Al-Khaleej Club	(Algeria); MC Oran	31 – 13	(Libya); Al-Ahli Tripoli
11	1986; Details	(Morocco); Oujda	(Tunisia); Club Africain	21 – 18	(Egypt); Al Ahly	(Saudi Arabia); Al-Ahli SC	27 – 14	(Morocco); MC Oujda
12	1988; Details	(Tunisia); Tunis	(Algeria); MC Oran	20 – 19	(Iraq); Al-Rasheed SC	(Tunisia); Club Africain	36 – 35 (ETx2)	(Saudi Arabia); Al-Ahli SC
13	1989; Details	(Morocco); Rabat	(Algeria); MC Alger	25 – 24	(Kuwait); Al-Salmiya SC	(Iraq); Al-Rasheed SC	–	
14	1991; Details	(Tunisia); Mahdia	(Algeria); MC Alger	^{n/a}	(Bahrain); Al-Wahda SC	(Tunisia); EM Mahdia	^{n/a}	(Morocco); PTT Marrakech
15	1993; Details	(Morocco); Marrakesh	(Egypt); Al Ahly	^{n/a}	(Algeria); MC Alger	(Morocco); KAC Marrakech	^{n/a}	(Kuwait); Kazma SC
16	1994; Details	(Syria); Daraa	(Egypt); Al Ahly	^{n/a}	(Algeria); MC Oran	(Syria); Al-Sho'ala Club	^{n/a}	(Saudi Arabia); Al-Khaleej Club
17	1995; Details	(Egypt); Cairo	(Egypt); Al Ahly	–	(Saudi Arabia); Al-Khaleej Club	(Morocco); Wydad AC	–	
18	1996; Details	(Jordan); Amman	(Saudi Arabia); Al-Noor SC	^{n/a}	(Qatar); Al-Ahli SC	(Kuwait); Al-Salmiya SC	^{n/a}	(Algeria); MC Alger
19	1997; Details	(United Arab Emirates); Dubai	(Egypt); Sporting Club	–	(Egypt); Zamalek	(Qatar); Al-Ahli SC	–	(Kuwait); Al-Salmiya SC
20	1998; Details	(Jordan); Amman	(Egypt); Al Ahly	–	(Saudi Arabia); Al-Ahli SC	(Morocco); Wydad AC	–	
21	1999; Details	(Jordan); Amman	(Egypt); Zamalek	24 – 22	(Egypt); Al Ahly	(Qatar); Al-Rayyan SC	–	
22	2000; Details	(United Arab Emirates); Sharjah	(Qatar); Al-Rayyan SC	–	(Egypt); Zamalek	Not awarded		
23	2001; Details	(Morocco); Casablanca	(Tunisia); ES Sahel	–	(Tunisia); ES Tunis	(Algeria); MC Alger	–	
24	2002; Details	(Syria); Damascus	(Saudi Arabia); Al-Khaleej Club	–	(Syria); Al-Jaish Club	(Syria); Al-Sho'ala Club	–	
25	2004; Details	(Tunisia); Sousse	(Tunisia); ES Sahel	–	(Algeria); WA Rouiba	(Algeria); US Biskra	–	
26	2005; Details	(Morocco); Casablanca	(Saudi Arabia); Al-Ahli	32 – 27	(Morocco); AS Casablanca	(Kuwait); Al Salibikhaet SC	37 – 31	(Algeria); US Biskra
27	2007; Details	(Saudi Arabia); Dammam	(Saudi Arabia); Al-Khaleej Club	33 – 30	(Algeria); JSE Skikda	(Saudi Arabia); Al-Qadisiyah SC	30 – 23	(Qatar); Al-Wakrah SC
28	2010; Details	(Egypt); Cairo	(Egypt); Al Ahly	^{n/a}	(Egypt); El-Olympi Club	(Saudi Arabia); Al-Wehda Club	^{n/a}	(Tunisia); Club Africain
29	2012; Details	(Morocco); Berkane	(Tunisia); Club Africain	33 – 28	Al-Kuwait SC	(Egypt) & (Saudi Arabia); Al Ahly & Al-Wehda^{1}		
30	2013; Details	(Saudi Arabia); Dammam	(Saudi Arabia); Al-Noor SC	22 – 21	(Saudi Arabia); Mudhar Club	(Qatar); Al Qiyadah SC	40 – 32	(Bahrain); Barbar Club
31	2014; Details	(Tunisia); Mahdia	(Bahrain); Al-Ahli Club	25 – 23	(Tunisia); El-Makarem Mahdia	(Tunisia); AS Téboulba	–	(Kuwait); Al-Salmiya SC
32	2015; Details	(Tunisia); Sousse	(Tunisia); ES Sahel	25 – 20	(Saudi Arabia); Al-Ahli SC	(Tunisia); El-Makarem Mahdia	36 – 31	(Saudi Arabia); Al-Safa Club
33	2017; Details	(Morocco); Oujda	(Tunisia); CS Sakiet Ezzit	38 – 37	(Qatar); Al-Arabi SC	(Saudi Arabia); Al-Safa Club	37 – 30	(Qatar); Al-Khor Club
34	2018; Details	(Tunisia); Sfax	(Tunisia); ES Tunis	26 – 20	(Tunisia); CS Sakiet Ezzit	(Qatar); Al Arabi SC	37 – 31	(Kuwait); Al-Salmiya SC
35	2019; Details	(Jordan); Amman	(Qatar); Al-Gharafa SC	36 – 32	(Algeria); GS Pétroliers	(Saudi Arabia); Al-Wehda Club	28 – 20	(Kuwait); Burgan SC
36	2021; Details	(Tunisia); Hammamet	(Tunisia); ES Tunis	26 – 24	(Tunisia); AS Hammamet	(Qatar); Al-Wakrah SC	26 – 24	(Tunisia); El Makarem de Mahdia
37	2022; Details	(Tunisia); Hammamet	(Tunisia); ES Tunis	29 – 28 (ET)	(Egypt); Zamalek	Al-Kuwait SC	33 – 30	(Tunisia); Club Africain
38	2023; Details	(Saudi Arabia); Qatif	Al-Kuwait SC	31 – 30	(Egypt); Zamalek	National Bank of Egypt SC	29 – 28	(Saudi Arabia); Mudhar HC
39	2024; Details	Kuwait	Al-Kuwait SC	32 – 23	(Kuwait); Al-Salmiya SC	(Qatar); Al-Gharafa SC	33 – 26	(Kuwait); Al-Qadisiyah SC
40	2025; Details	Kuwait	Al-Kuwait SC	32 – 22	(Kuwait); Kazma SC	National Bank of Egypt SC	30 – 27	(Iraq); Al-Hashd Al-Shaabi SC

^n/a A round-robin tournament determined the final standings.
^1 No third place match played.

- 1982 not held - This edition in Syria was canceled following the Israeli military intervention in Lebanon.
- 2000: The Al-Rayyan SC - Zamalek match was in fact a semi-final while a second semi-final opposed Al Ahly Jeddah to Al-Ahly Cairo but this last match experienced serious incidents and was interrupted. The organizers therefore treated the first semi-final as a final and did not award a bronze medal.

== Winners by club ==
Rank	Club	Winners	Runners-Up	Third	Fourth	Total
1	(Tunisia) ES Tunis	7	2	0	0	9
2	(Egypt) Al Ahly	5	2	1	0	8
3	(Algeria) MC Oran	3	1	1	0	5
3	Al-Kuwait SC	3	1	1	0	5
4	(Tunisia) ES Sahel	3	0	0	0	3
5	(Saudi Arabia) Al-Khaleej Club	2	4	0	0	6
6	(Saudi Arabia) Al-Ahli SC	2	3	2	0	7
7	(Algeria) MC Alger	2	2	2	0	6
8	(Tunisia) Club Africain	2	0	1	1	4
9	(Saudi Arabia) Al-Noor SC	2	0	0	0	2
10	(Egypt) Zamalek	1	4	0	0	5
12	(Tunisia) CS Sakiet Ezzit	1	1	0	0	2
13	(Qatar) Al-Rayyan SC	1	0	1	0	2
14	(Bahrain) Al-Ahli Club	1	0	0	1	2
15	(Algeria) Nadit Alger	1	0	0	0	1
15	(Egypt) Sporting Club	1	0	0	0	1
15	(United Arab Emirates) Al Ain HC	1	0	0	0	1
15	(Qatar) Al-Gharafa SC	1	0	1	0	2

- MC Alger (ex. GS Pétroliers)

== Medal table ==
Rank	Nation	Gold	Silver	Bronze	Total
1	Tunisia (TUN)	13	6	4	23
2	Egypt (EGY)	7	8	3	18
3	Saudi Arabia (KSA)	6	9	6	21
4	Algeria (ALG)	6	5	3	14
5	Kuwait (KUW)	3	5	5	13
6	Qatar (QAT)	2	1	7	10
7	Bahrain (BHR)	1	1	0	2
8	United Arab Emirates (UAE)	1	0	0	1
9	Syria (SYR)	0	1	5	6
10	Morocco (MAR)	0	1	2	3
11	Iraq (IRQ)	0	1	1	2
11	Libya (LBA)	0	1	1	2
13	Palestine (PLE)	0	0	1	1
Totals (13 entries)		39	39	38	116

- 1982 Not Held.
- 2000 Bronze Not Awarded.

== See also ==
- Arab Handball Championship of Winners' Cup
- Arab Handball Super Cup
- Arab Women's Handball Championship of Champions
- Arab Women's Handball Championship of Winners' Cup
- Arab Women's Handball Super Cup
