= Al Arabi SC (handball) =

Qatari handball club

Al Arabi
- Full name: Al Arabi Handball Team
- Nickname(s): The Dreams; The Red Devils; Century Club
- Founded: 1952; 74 years ago
- President: Sheikh Tamim Bin Fahad Al-Thani
- League: Qatar Handball League
- 2019–20: 1st (champions)
- Club colours
Home	Away

Al Arabi's active sections
Football	Basketball	Handball
Volleyball	Futsal	Reserves

Al Arabi Handball Team (Arabic: فريق العربي لكرة اليد) is the handball team of Al Arabi SC, based in the capital city of Doha, Qatar. It currently competes in the Qatar Handball League (QHL).

== Honours ==
- Qatar Handball League: 1982–83, 2019–20, 2024–25
