= Mudhar Club (handball) =

Mudhar H.C (Arabic: نادي مضر السعودي لكرة اليد, English: Mudhar Handball Club) is a Saudi Arabian handball team based in Al-Qudaih, that plays in Prince Faisal bin Fahad Saudi Handball League. They have won the Saudi Championship 4 times, the latest being in 2022.

They played at the 2012, 2019, 2022 and 2023 IHF Super Globes.

== See also ==
- List of handball clubs in Saudi Arabia
