= 2019–20 EHF Cup group stage =

This article describes the group stage of the 2019–20 EHF Cup, a men's handball competition.

== Draw ==
The 16 teams allocated into four pots will be drawn into four groups of four teams. The draw seeding pots were composed as follows:

| Pot 1 | Pot 2 | Pot 3 | Pot 4 |
|---|---|---|---|
| (France) PAUC Handball; (Germany) SC Magdeburg; (Germany) Rhein-Neckar Löwen; (Germany) MT Melsungen | (Denmark) Bjerringbro-Silkeborg; (Spain) Liberbank Cuenca; (France) HBC Nantes; (Hungary) Grundfos Tatabánya KC | (France) USAM Nîmes Gard; (Germany) Füchse Berlin; (Poland) Gwardia Opole; (Slovenia) RK Gorenje Velenje | (Denmark) TTH Holstebro; (Spain) CB Ademar León; (Spain) BM Logroño La Rioja; (Portugal) SL Benfica |

The draw of the EHF Cup group stage took place on Thursday, 28 November 2019.

== Format ==
In each group, teams will play against each other in a double round-robin format, with home and away matches. After completion of the group stage matches, the top teams and the best three second-placed teams advance to the Quarter-finals. Teams are not able to face opponents from the same country in the group.

== Tiebreakers ==
In the group stage, teams will be ranked according to points (2 points for a win, 1 point for a draw, 0 points for a loss). After completion of the group stage, if two or more teams had scored the same number of points, the ranking will be determined as follows:

1. Highest number of points in matches between the teams directly involved;
2. Superior goal difference in matches between the teams directly involved;
3. Highest number of goals scored in matches between the teams directly involved (or in the away match in case of a two-team tie);
4. Superior goal difference in all matches of the group;
5. Highest number of plus goals in all matches of the group;

If the ranking of one of these teams is determined, the above criteria are consecutively followed until the ranking of all teams is determined. If no ranking can be determined, a decision shall be obtained by EHF through drawing of lots.

== Groups ==
The matchdays will be 8–9 February, 15–16 February, 22–23 February, 29 February–1 March, 21–22 March and 28–29 March 2020.

The European Handball Federation announced on 13 March 2020, that the EHF Cup group stage matches round 5 and 6 (21 to 22 and 28 to 29 March) matches will not be held as scheduled due to the ongoing developments in the spread of COVID-19 across Europe. On 25 March, the EHF announced that no matches will be played before June due to the coronavirus pandemic. On 24 April 2020 the matches were cancelled.

=== Group A ===
| Pos | Team | Pld | W | D | L | GF | GA | GD | Pts | Qualification |
|---|---|---|---|---|---|---|---|---|---|---|
| 1 | (Portugal) SL Benfica | 4 | 4 | 0 | 0 | 121 | 97 | +24 | 8 | Knockout stage |
| 2 | (Germany) MT Melsungen | 4 | 2 | 0 | 2 | 118 | 118 | 0 | 4 | Ranking of the second-placed teams |
| 3 | (Denmark) Bjerringbro-Silkeborg | 4 | 2 | 0 | 2 | 124 | 128 | −4 | 4 | Eliminated |
| 4 | (Poland) Gwardia Opole | 4 | 0 | 0 | 4 | 97 | 117 | −20 | 0 | Eliminated |

Updated to match(es) played on 29 February 2020. Source: EHF

| 9 February 2020; 15:00 | MT Melsungen (Germany) | 26–21 | (Poland) Gwardia Opole | Rothenbach-Halle, Kassel; Attendance: 2,786; Referees: Budzák, Záhradník (SVK) |
| 9 February 2020; 15:00 | Ignatow 5 | (12–10) | Mauer 7 | Rothenbach-Halle, Kassel; Attendance: 2,786; Referees: Budzák, Záhradník (SVK) |
| 9 February 2020; 15:00 | 2× (yellow card) 3× (suspension) 1× (red card) | Report | 2× (yellow card) 7× (suspension) | Rothenbach-Halle, Kassel; Attendance: 2,786; Referees: Budzák, Záhradník (SVK) |

| 9 February 2020; 15:00 | Bjerringbro-Silkeborg (Denmark) | 24–33 | (Portugal) SL Benfica | Jysk Arena, Silkeborg; Attendance: 2,011; Referees: Bonaventura, Bonaventura (FRA) |
| 9 February 2020; 15:00 | Hansen 11 | (11–14) | Đorđić 11 | Jysk Arena, Silkeborg; Attendance: 2,011; Referees: Bonaventura, Bonaventura (FRA) |
| 9 February 2020; 15:00 | 2× (yellow card) 3× (suspension) | Report | 1× (yellow card) 3× (suspension) | Jysk Arena, Silkeborg; Attendance: 2,011; Referees: Bonaventura, Bonaventura (FRA) |

| 15 February 2020; 17:15 | SL Benfica (Portugal) | 29–26 | (Germany) MT Melsungen | Pavilhão da Luz Nº 2, Lisbon; Attendance: 1,122; Referees: Boričič, Marković (SRB) |
| 15 February 2020; 17:15 | Đorđić 9 | (16–11) | Mikkelsen 6 | Pavilhão da Luz Nº 2, Lisbon; Attendance: 1,122; Referees: Boričič, Marković (SRB) |
| 15 February 2020; 17:15 | 2× (yellow card) 5× (suspension) | Report | 1× (yellow card) 5× (suspension) | Pavilhão da Luz Nº 2, Lisbon; Attendance: 1,122; Referees: Boričič, Marković (SRB) |

| 16 February 2020; 19:00 | Gwardia Opole (Poland) | 29–32 | (Denmark) Bjerringbro-Silkeborg | Stegu Arena, Opole; Attendance: 3,374; Referees: Čerņavskis, Bogdanovs (LAT) |
| 16 February 2020; 19:00 | Działakiewicz 6 | (12–20) | Pedersen 9 | Stegu Arena, Opole; Attendance: 3,374; Referees: Čerņavskis, Bogdanovs (LAT) |
| 16 February 2020; 19:00 | 2× (yellow card) 7× (suspension) | Report | 2× (yellow card) 6× (suspension) | Stegu Arena, Opole; Attendance: 3,374; Referees: Čerņavskis, Bogdanovs (LAT) |

| 19 February 2020; 18:45 | Bjerringbro-Silkeborg (Denmark) | 35–31 | (Germany) MT Melsungen | Jysk Arena, Silkeborg; Attendance: 1,973; Referees: Kaludjerović, Vujacić (MNE) |
| 19 February 2020; 18:45 | Hansen 9 | (16–19) | Kühn 9 | Jysk Arena, Silkeborg; Attendance: 1,973; Referees: Kaludjerović, Vujacić (MNE) |
| 19 February 2020; 18:45 | 2× (yellow card) 5× (suspension) | Report | 2× (yellow card) 3× (suspension) | Jysk Arena, Silkeborg; Attendance: 1,973; Referees: Kaludjerović, Vujacić (MNE) |

| 22 February 2020; 17:00 | SL Benfica (Portugal) | 29–24 | (Poland) Gwardia Opole | Pavilhão da Luz Nº 2, Lisbon; Attendance: 397; Referees: Manea, Iliescu (ROU) |
| 22 February 2020; 17:00 | Đorđić 9 | (14–12) | Mauer 8 | Pavilhão da Luz Nº 2, Lisbon; Attendance: 397; Referees: Manea, Iliescu (ROU) |
| 22 February 2020; 17:00 | 3× (yellow card) 5× (suspension) | Report | 3× (yellow card) 5× (suspension) 1× (red card) | Pavilhão da Luz Nº 2, Lisbon; Attendance: 397; Referees: Manea, Iliescu (ROU) |

| 29 February 2020; 19:00 | Gwardia Opole (Poland) | 23–30 | (Portugal) SL Benfica | Stegu Arena, Opole; Attendance: 2,800; Referees: Aghakishi, Aghakishi (AZE) |
| 29 February 2020; 19:00 | Mauer 5 | (12–17) | Đorđić 8 | Stegu Arena, Opole; Attendance: 2,800; Referees: Aghakishi, Aghakishi (AZE) |
| 29 February 2020; 19:00 | 1× (yellow card) 3× (suspension) | Report | 1× (yellow card) 6× (suspension) 1× (red card) | Stegu Arena, Opole; Attendance: 2,800; Referees: Aghakishi, Aghakishi (AZE) |

| 29 February 2020; 20:45 | MT Melsungen (Germany) | 35–33 | (Denmark) Bjerringbro-Silkeborg | Rothenbach-Halle, Kassel; Attendance: 2,878; Referees: Bounouara, Sami (FRA) |
| 29 February 2020; 20:45 | Marić 9 | (18–14) | Nøddesbo 9 | Rothenbach-Halle, Kassel; Attendance: 2,878; Referees: Bounouara, Sami (FRA) |
| 29 February 2020; 20:45 | 2× (yellow card) 3× (suspension) | Report | 1× (yellow card) 2× (suspension) | Rothenbach-Halle, Kassel; Attendance: 2,878; Referees: Bounouara, Sami (FRA) |

| SL Benfica (Portugal) | Cancelled | (Denmark) Bjerringbro-Silkeborg |

| Gwardia Opole (Poland) | Cancelled | (Germany) MT Melsungen |

| MT Melsungen (Germany) | Cancelled | (Portugal) SL Benfica |

| Bjerringbro-Silkeborg (Denmark) | Cancelled | (Poland) Gwardia Opole |

=== Group B ===
| Pos | Team | Pld | W | D | L | GF | GA | GD | Pts | Qualification |
|---|---|---|---|---|---|---|---|---|---|---|
| 1 | (Germany) Rhein-Neckar Löwen | 4 | 4 | 0 | 0 | 136 | 111 | +25 | 8 | Knockout stage |
| 2 | (France) USAM Nîmes Gard | 4 | 2 | 1 | 1 | 123 | 117 | +6 | 5 | Ranking of the second-placed teams |
| 3 | (Spain) Liberbank Cuenca | 4 | 1 | 1 | 2 | 111 | 125 | −14 | 3 | Eliminated |
| 4 | (Denmark) TTH Holstebro (E) | 4 | 0 | 0 | 4 | 110 | 127 | −17 | 0 | Eliminated |

Updated to match(es) played on 29 February 2020. Source: EHF
(E) Eliminated

| 9 February 2020; 12:00 | Liberbank Cuenca (Spain) | 29–27 | (Denmark) TTH Holstebro | Pabellón Municipal El Sargal, Cuenca; Attendance: 1,700; Referees: Bolic, Hurich (ESP) |
| 9 February 2020; 12:00 | Dutra, Alves 6 | (11–10) | Kildelund 7 | Pabellón Municipal El Sargal, Cuenca; Attendance: 1,700; Referees: Bolic, Hurich (ESP) |
| 9 February 2020; 12:00 | 1× (yellow card) 3× (suspension) | Report | 2× (yellow card) 5× (suspension) | Pabellón Municipal El Sargal, Cuenca; Attendance: 1,700; Referees: Bolic, Hurich (ESP) |

| 9 February 2020; 17:00 | Rhein-Neckar Löwen (Germany) | 32–31 | (France) USAM Nîmes Gard | GBG Halle am Herzogenried, Mannheim; Attendance: 1,541; Referees: Vitaku, Vitaku (KOS) |
| 9 February 2020; 17:00 | Schmid 8 | (16–16) | Sanad 8 | GBG Halle am Herzogenried, Mannheim; Attendance: 1,541; Referees: Vitaku, Vitaku (KOS) |
| 9 February 2020; 17:00 | 2× (yellow card) 2× (suspension) | Report | 2× (yellow card) 5× (suspension) | GBG Halle am Herzogenried, Mannheim; Attendance: 1,541; Referees: Vitaku, Vitaku (KOS) |

| 15 February 2020; 18:30 | USAM Nîmes Gard (France) | 29–29 | (Spain) Liberbank Cuenca | Le Parnasse, Nîmes; Attendance: 2,800; Referees: Pirvu, Potirniche (ROU) |
| 15 February 2020; 18:30 | Tobie 11 | (17–13) | Alves 8 | Le Parnasse, Nîmes; Attendance: 2,800; Referees: Pirvu, Potirniche (ROU) |
| 15 February 2020; 18:30 | 3× (yellow card) 6× (suspension) 1× (red card) | Report | 6× (suspension) 1× (red card) | Le Parnasse, Nîmes; Attendance: 2,800; Referees: Pirvu, Potirniche (ROU) |

| 15 February 2020; 19:30 | TTH Holstebro (Denmark) | 27–35 | (Germany) Rhein-Neckar Löwen | Gråkjær Arena, Holstebro; Attendance: 2,485; Referees: Cindrić, Gonzurek (CRO) |
| 15 February 2020; 19:30 | Meklenborg 8 | (12–16) | Kohlbacher 7 | Gråkjær Arena, Holstebro; Attendance: 2,485; Referees: Cindrić, Gonzurek (CRO) |
| 15 February 2020; 19:30 | 3× (yellow card) 4× (suspension) | Report | 1× (yellow card) 2× (suspension) | Gråkjær Arena, Holstebro; Attendance: 2,485; Referees: Cindrić, Gonzurek (CRO) |

| 22 February 2020; 15:00 | TTH Holstebro (Denmark) | 28–30 | (France) USAM Nîmes Gard | Gråkjær Arena, Holstebro; Attendance: 2,053; Referees: Nabokau, Kulik (BLR) |
| 22 February 2020; 15:00 | Meklenborg 8 | (13–16) | Sanad 9 | Gråkjær Arena, Holstebro; Attendance: 2,053; Referees: Nabokau, Kulik (BLR) |
| 22 February 2020; 15:00 | 1× (yellow card) 2× (suspension) | Report | 3× (yellow card) 2× (suspension) | Gråkjær Arena, Holstebro; Attendance: 2,053; Referees: Nabokau, Kulik (BLR) |

| 23 February 2020; 12:00 | Liberbank Cuenca (Spain) | 28–33 | (Germany) Rhein-Neckar Löwen | Pabellón Municipal El Sargal, Cuenca; Attendance: 1,700; Referees: Pandžić, Mošorinski (SRB) |
| 23 February 2020; 12:00 | Dutra 9 | (16–16) | Gensheimer, Kirkeløkke 8 | Pabellón Municipal El Sargal, Cuenca; Attendance: 1,700; Referees: Pandžić, Mošorinski (SRB) |
| 23 February 2020; 12:00 | 1× (yellow card) 1× (suspension) | Report | 1× (yellow card) 2× (suspension) | Pabellón Municipal El Sargal, Cuenca; Attendance: 1,700; Referees: Pandžić, Mošorinski (SRB) |

| 26 February 2020; 19:30 | Rhein-Neckar Löwen (Germany) | 36–25 | (Spain) Liberbank Cuenca | GBG Halle am Herzogenried, Mannheim; Attendance: 1,403; Referees: Smailagic, Smailagic (SWE) |
| 26 February 2020; 19:30 | Schmid 8 | (21–13) | Dutra 7 | GBG Halle am Herzogenried, Mannheim; Attendance: 1,403; Referees: Smailagic, Smailagic (SWE) |
| 26 February 2020; 19:30 | 1× (yellow card) 2× (suspension) | Report | 2× (yellow card) 2× (suspension) | GBG Halle am Herzogenried, Mannheim; Attendance: 1,403; Referees: Smailagic, Smailagic (SWE) |

| 29 February 2020; 19:00 | USAM Nîmes Gard (France) | 33–28 | (Denmark) TTH Holstebro | Le Parnasse, Nîmes; Attendance: 2,700; Referees: Caçador, Nicolau (POR) |
| 29 February 2020; 19:00 | Prandi, Tobie 7 | (15–14) | Bramming, Meklenborg 7 | Le Parnasse, Nîmes; Attendance: 2,700; Referees: Caçador, Nicolau (POR) |
| 29 February 2020; 19:00 | 2× (yellow card) 5× (suspension) | Report | 3× (yellow card) 4× (suspension) 1× (red card) | Le Parnasse, Nîmes; Attendance: 2,700; Referees: Caçador, Nicolau (POR) |

| USAM Nîmes Gard (France) | Cancelled | (Germany) Rhein-Neckar Löwen |

| TTH Holstebro (Denmark) | Cancelled | (Spain) Liberbank Cuenca |

| Liberbank Cuenca (Spain) | Cancelled | (France) USAM Nîmes Gard |

| Rhein-Neckar Löwen (Germany) | Cancelled | (Denmark) TTH Holstebro |

=== Group C ===
| Pos | Team | Pld | W | D | L | GF | GA | GD | Pts | Qualification |
|---|---|---|---|---|---|---|---|---|---|---|
| 1 | (Germany) SC Magdeburg | 4 | 4 | 0 | 0 | 123 | 109 | +14 | 8 | Knockout stage |
| 2 | (France) HBC Nantes | 4 | 2 | 0 | 2 | 125 | 116 | +9 | 4 | Ranking of the second-placed teams |
| 3 | (Slovenia) Gorenje Velenje | 4 | 2 | 0 | 2 | 110 | 115 | −5 | 4 | Eliminated |
| 4 | (Spain) Abanca Ademar León | 4 | 0 | 0 | 4 | 103 | 121 | −18 | 0 | Eliminated |

Updated to match(es) played on 1 March 2020. Source: EHF

| 9 February 2020; 13:00 | SC Magdeburg (Germany) | 32–26 | (Slovenia) Gorenje Velenje | GETEC Arena, Magdeburg; Attendance: 4,531; Referees: Caçador, Nicolau (POR) |
| 9 February 2020; 13:00 | Pettersson 9 | (15–13) | Bojanić, Celminš 5 | GETEC Arena, Magdeburg; Attendance: 4,531; Referees: Caçador, Nicolau (POR) |
| 9 February 2020; 13:00 | 2× (yellow card) 2× (suspension) | Report | 2× (yellow card) 2× (suspension) | GETEC Arena, Magdeburg; Attendance: 4,531; Referees: Caçador, Nicolau (POR) |

| 9 February 2020; 17:00 | HBC Nantes (France) | 34–28 | (Spain) Abanca Ademar Leon | Palais des Sports de Beaulieu, Nantes; Attendance: 5,650; Referees: Mitrevski, Todorovski (MKD) |
| 9 February 2020; 17:00 | Rivera Folch 9 | (17–16) | three players 4 | Palais des Sports de Beaulieu, Nantes; Attendance: 5,650; Referees: Mitrevski, Todorovski (MKD) |
| 9 February 2020; 17:00 | 2× (yellow card) 5× (suspension) | Report | 3× (yellow card) 6× (suspension) | Palais des Sports de Beaulieu, Nantes; Attendance: 5,650; Referees: Mitrevski, Todorovski (MKD) |

| 12 February 2020; 20:00 | Abanca Ademar Leon (Spain) | 27–31 | (Germany) SC Magdeburg | Palacio de los Deportes de León, León; Attendance: 3,000; Referees: Di Domenico, Fornasier (ITA) |
| 12 February 2020; 20:00 | Alonso 8 | (14–12) | Damgaard 9 | Palacio de los Deportes de León, León; Attendance: 3,000; Referees: Di Domenico, Fornasier (ITA) |
| 12 February 2020; 20:00 | 4× (yellow card) 2× (suspension) | Report | 2× (yellow card) 3× (suspension) | Palacio de los Deportes de León, León; Attendance: 3,000; Referees: Di Domenico, Fornasier (ITA) |

| 16 February 2020; 18:45 | Gorenje Velenje (Slovenia) | 28–35 | (France) HBC Nantes | Rdeča dvorana, Velenje; Attendance: 1,000; Referees: Baumgart, Wild (GER) |
| 16 February 2020; 18:45 | Verdinek 8 | (12–19) | Rivera Folch 9 | Rdeča dvorana, Velenje; Attendance: 1,000; Referees: Baumgart, Wild (GER) |
| 16 February 2020; 18:45 | 3× (yellow card) 5× (suspension) | Report | 3× (yellow card) 3× (suspension) | Rdeča dvorana, Velenje; Attendance: 1,000; Referees: Baumgart, Wild (GER) |

| 22 February 2020; 19:30 | Abanca Ademar Leon (Spain) | 23–26 | (Slovenia) Gorenje Velenje | Palacio de los Deportes de León, León; Attendance: 3,500; Referees: Argyridis, Mouttas (CYP) |
| 22 February 2020; 19:30 | five players 3 | (14–13) | Kavčič, Verdinek 5 | Palacio de los Deportes de León, León; Attendance: 3,500; Referees: Argyridis, Mouttas (CYP) |
| 22 February 2020; 19:30 | 2× (yellow card) | Report | 2× (yellow card) 3× (suspension) | Palacio de los Deportes de León, León; Attendance: 3,500; Referees: Argyridis, Mouttas (CYP) |

| 23 February 2020; 17:00 | HBC Nantes (France) | 28–31 | (Germany) SC Magdeburg | Palais des Sports de Beaulieu, Nantes; Attendance: 5,902; Referees: Gousko, Repkin (BLR) |
| 23 February 2020; 17:00 | Lazarov 6 | (9–15) | Damgaard, Schmidt 7 | Palais des Sports de Beaulieu, Nantes; Attendance: 5,902; Referees: Gousko, Repkin (BLR) |
| 23 February 2020; 17:00 | 1× (yellow card) 3× (suspension) | Report | 2× (yellow card) 6× (suspension) | Palais des Sports de Beaulieu, Nantes; Attendance: 5,902; Referees: Gousko, Repkin (BLR) |

| 29 February 2020; 17:00 | Gorenje Velenje (Slovenia) | 30–25 | (Spain) Abanca Ademar Leon | Rdeča dvorana, Velenje; Attendance: 1,000; Referees: Leszczyński, Piechota (POL) |
| 29 February 2020; 17:00 | Kavčič 9 | (13–14) | three players 5 | Rdeča dvorana, Velenje; Attendance: 1,000; Referees: Leszczyński, Piechota (POL) |
| 29 February 2020; 17:00 | 2× (yellow card) 5× (suspension) 1× (red card) | Report | 2× (yellow card) 5× (suspension) | Rdeča dvorana, Velenje; Attendance: 1,000; Referees: Leszczyński, Piechota (POL) |

| 1 March 2020; 18:00 | SC Magdeburg (Germany) | 29–28 | (France) HBC Nantes | GETEC Arena, Magdeburg; Referees: Konjičanin, Konjičanin (BIH) |
| 1 March 2020; 18:00 | Damgaard 10 | (16–12) | Minne 10 | GETEC Arena, Magdeburg; Referees: Konjičanin, Konjičanin (BIH) |
| 1 March 2020; 18:00 | 2× (yellow card) 6× (suspension) | Report | 2× (yellow card) 4× (suspension) | GETEC Arena, Magdeburg; Referees: Konjičanin, Konjičanin (BIH) |

| Gorenje Velenje (Slovenia) | Cancelled | (Germany) SC Magdeburg |

| Abanca Ademar Leon (Spain) | Cancelled | (France) HBC Nantes |

| SC Magdeburg (Germany) | Cancelled | (Spain) Abanca Ademar Leon |

| HBC Nantes (France) | Cancelled | (Slovenia) Gorenje Velenje |

=== Group D ===
| Pos | Team | Pld | W | D | L | GF | GA | GD | Pts | Qualification |
|---|---|---|---|---|---|---|---|---|---|---|
| 1 | (Germany) Füchse Berlin | 4 | 2 | 1 | 1 | 110 | 102 | +8 | 5 | Knockout stage |
| 2 | (France) PAUC Handball | 4 | 1 | 2 | 1 | 102 | 100 | +2 | 4 | Ranking of the second-placed teams |
| 3 | (Hungary) Grundfos Tatabánya KC | 4 | 1 | 2 | 1 | 99 | 102 | −3 | 4 | Eliminated |
| 4 | (Spain) BM Logroño La Rioja | 4 | 1 | 1 | 2 | 106 | 113 | −7 | 3 | Eliminated |

Updated to match(es) played on 1 March 2020. Source: EHF

| 8 February 2020; 12:00 | Grundfos Tatabánya KC (Hungary) | 26–25 | (Spain) BM Logroño La Rioja | Audi Aréna, Győr; Attendance: 2,500; Referees: Christiansen, Hansen (DEN) |
| 8 February 2020; 12:00 | Ancsin 6 | (15–11) | Hackbarth 5 | Audi Aréna, Győr; Attendance: 2,500; Referees: Christiansen, Hansen (DEN) |
| 8 February 2020; 12:00 | 1× (yellow card) 3× (suspension) | Report | 1× (yellow card) 2× (suspension) | Audi Aréna, Győr; Attendance: 2,500; Referees: Christiansen, Hansen (DEN) |

| 9 February 2020; 19:00 | PAUC Handball (France) | 23–25 | (Germany) Füchse Berlin | Aréna du Pays d'Aix, Aix-en-Provence; Attendance: 2,000; Referees: Stark, Ştefan (ROU) |
| 9 February 2020; 19:00 | Larsen 6 | (10–11) | Mandalinić 6 | Aréna du Pays d'Aix, Aix-en-Provence; Attendance: 2,000; Referees: Stark, Ştefan (ROU) |
| 9 February 2020; 19:00 | 3× (yellow card) 2× (suspension) | Report | 3× (yellow card) 4× (suspension) | Aréna du Pays d'Aix, Aix-en-Provence; Attendance: 2,000; Referees: Stark, Ştefan (ROU) |

| 13 February 2020; 19:00 | Füchse Berlin (Germany) | 27–27 | (Hungary) Grundfos Tatabánya KC | Max-Schmeling-Halle, Berlin; Attendance: 5,919; Referees: Ben-Dan, Faran (ISR) |
| 13 February 2020; 19:00 | Holm 6 | (15–17) | Borzaš 9 | Max-Schmeling-Halle, Berlin; Attendance: 5,919; Referees: Ben-Dan, Faran (ISR) |
| 13 February 2020; 19:00 | 3× (yellow card) 2× (suspension) | Report | 1× (yellow card) 7× (suspension) | Max-Schmeling-Halle, Berlin; Attendance: 5,919; Referees: Ben-Dan, Faran (ISR) |

| 15 February 2020; 19:00 | BM Logroño La Rioja (Spain) | 29–29 | (France) PAUC Handball | Palacio de los Deportes de La Rioja, Logroño; Attendance: 1,650; Referees: Martins, Martins (POR) |
| 15 February 2020; 19:00 | Hackbarth, Kukić 6 | (15–15) | Larsen 8 | Palacio de los Deportes de La Rioja, Logroño; Attendance: 1,650; Referees: Martins, Martins (POR) |
| 15 February 2020; 19:00 | 2× (yellow card) 4× (suspension) | Report | 2× (yellow card) 6× (suspension) | Palacio de los Deportes de La Rioja, Logroño; Attendance: 1,650; Referees: Martins, Martins (POR) |

| 22 February 2020; 17:00 | Grundfos Tatabánya KC (Hungary) | 24–24 | (France) PAUC Handball | Audi Aréna, Győr; Attendance: 2,700; Referees: Jović, Arnautović (BIH) |
| 22 February 2020; 17:00 | Ancsin 6 | (11–15) | Leoz 5 | Audi Aréna, Győr; Attendance: 2,700; Referees: Jović, Arnautović (BIH) |
| 22 February 2020; 17:00 | 2× (yellow card) 2× (suspension) | Report | 2× (yellow card) 3× (suspension) | Audi Aréna, Győr; Attendance: 2,700; Referees: Jović, Arnautović (BIH) |

| 22 February 2020; 19:00 | BM Logroño La Rioja (Spain) | 26–25 | (Germany) Füchse Berlin | Palacio de los Deportes de La Rioja, Logroño; Attendance: 1,800; Referees: Brunovský, Čanda (SVK) |
| 22 February 2020; 19:00 | Scott Junior 7 | (13–11) | Holm 8 | Palacio de los Deportes de La Rioja, Logroño; Attendance: 1,800; Referees: Brunovský, Čanda (SVK) |
| 22 February 2020; 19:00 | 3× (yellow card) 2× (suspension) | Report | 2× (yellow card) 4× (suspension) | Palacio de los Deportes de La Rioja, Logroño; Attendance: 1,800; Referees: Brunovský, Čanda (SVK) |

| 1 March 2020; 16:00 | Füchse Berlin (Germany) | 33–26 | (Spain) BM Logroño La Rioja | Max-Schmeling-Halle, Berlin; Attendance: 5,362; Referees: Šniūrevičius, Grigalionis (LTU) |
| 1 March 2020; 16:00 | Müller 8 | (15–14) | Alustiza, Kušan 6 | Max-Schmeling-Halle, Berlin; Attendance: 5,362; Referees: Šniūrevičius, Grigalionis (LTU) |
| 1 March 2020; 16:00 | 1× (yellow card) 6× (suspension) | Report | 1× (yellow card) 2× (suspension) | Max-Schmeling-Halle, Berlin; Attendance: 5,362; Referees: Šniūrevičius, Grigalionis (LTU) |

| 1 March 2020; 19:00 | PAUC Handball (France) | 26–22 | (Hungary) Grundfos Tatabánya KC | Aréna du Pays d'Aix, Aix-en-Provence; Attendance: 1,400; Referees: Ershov, Pavliukov (RUS) |
| 1 March 2020; 19:00 | Leoz 5 | (14–8) | Hornyák, Komogorov 4 | Aréna du Pays d'Aix, Aix-en-Provence; Attendance: 1,400; Referees: Ershov, Pavliukov (RUS) |
| 1 March 2020; 19:00 | 3× (yellow card) 4× (suspension) | Report | 2× (yellow card) 4× (suspension) | Aréna du Pays d'Aix, Aix-en-Provence; Attendance: 1,400; Referees: Ershov, Pavliukov (RUS) |

| Füchse Berlin (Germany) | Cancelled | (France) PAUC Handball |

| BM Logroño La Rioja (Spain) | Cancelled | (Hungary) Grundfos Tatabánya KC |

| PAUC Handball (France) | Cancelled | (Spain) BM Logroño La Rioja |

| Grundfos Tatabánya KC (Hungary) | Cancelled | (Germany) Füchse Berlin |
