= 2019–20 EHF Cup =

European handball tournament

EHF Cup
- 2019–20

Tournament information
- Sport: Handball
- Dates: 31 August 2019–~~24 May 2020~~
- Teams: 64 (qualification stage); 16 (group stage)
- Website: eurohandball.com

Final positions
- Champions: Cancelled

Tournament statistics
- Top scorer(s): (Egypt) Mohammad Sanad (49 goals)

The 2019–20 EHF Cup was the 39th edition of the EHF Cup, the second most important European handball club competition organised by the European Handball Federation (EHF), and the seventh edition since the merger with the EHF Cup Winners' Cup. On 24 April 2020 EHF announced that EHF Cup would be cancelled due to COVID-19 pandemic.

== Team allocation ==
=== Teams ===
Third qualifying round
(Germany) SC Magdeburg	(Germany) Rhein-Neckar Löwen	(France) Chambéry Savoie Mont-Blanc	(Germany) MT Melsungen
(France) HBC Nantes	(Denmark) Bjerringbro-Silkeborg	(Spain) Liberbank Cuenca	(Hungary) Grundfos Tatabánya KC
(Poland) Gwardia Opole	(North Macedonia) Metalurg Skopje	(Germany) Füchse Berlin	(France) USAM Nîmes Gard
(Denmark) TTH Holstebro	(Spain) BM Logroño La Rioja	(Hungary) Balatonfüredi KSE	(Croatia) RK Nexe
Second qualifying round
(Poland) NMC Górnik Zabrze	(Slovenia) RK Gorenje Velenje	(Romania) SCM Politehnica Timișoara	(Switzerland) Wacker Thun
(Belarus) SKA Minsk	(Israel) Hapoel Ashdod	(Norway) ØIF Arendal Elite	(Iceland) Selfoss
(North Macedonia) HC Butel Skopje	(France) PAUC Handball	(Denmark) Skjern Håndbold	(Spain) CB Ademar León
(Hungary) Csurgói KK	(Poland) KS Azoty-Puławy	(North Macedonia) RK Pelister	(Portugal) SL Benfica
First qualifying round
(Croatia) RK Dubrava	(Slovenia) RD Ribnica	(Romania) HC Dobrogea Sud Constanța	(Israel) Maccabi Rishon LeZion
(Iceland) FH Hafnarfjordur	(Russia) Spartak Moscow	(Czech Republic) SSK Talent M.A.T.Plzeň	(Ukraine) ZTR Zaporizhia
(Serbia) RK Vojvodina	(Belgium) HC Achilles Bocholt	(Greece) Olympiacos S.F.P.	(Austria) Alpla HC Hard
(Netherlands) KRAS/Volendam	(Kosovo) KH BESA Famgas	(Luxembourg) Handball Esch	(Turkey) Beşiktaş Aygaz
(Estonia) Põlva Serviti	(Lithuania) Dragūnas Klaipėda	(Italy) SSV Bozen Loacker	(United Kingdom) London GD
(Georgia (country)) B.S.B. Batumi	(Montenegro) RK Lovćen	(Bosnia and Herzegovina) RK Borac m:tel	(Malta) Swieqi Phoenix Handball Club
(Serbia) RK Metaloplastika	(Belgium) HC Visé BM	(Turkey) CIP Travel Antalyaspo A.Ş.	(Croatia) RK Poreč
(Sweden) HK Malmö	(Switzerland) Pfadi Winterthur	(Iceland) Haukar Handball	(Austria) SG Handball West Wien

== Round and draw dates ==
The schedule of the competition was as follows (all draws were held at the EHF headquarters in Vienna, Austria).

Phase	Round	Draw date	First leg	Second leg
Qualification	First qualifying round	16 July 2019	31 August-1 September 2019	7-8 September 2019
Qualification	Second qualifying round	16 July 2019	5–6 October 2019	12–13 October 2019
Qualification	Third qualifying round	15 October 2019	16–17 November 2019	23–24 November 2019
Group stage	Matchday 1	28 November 2019	8–9 February 2020	
Group stage	Matchday 2	28 November 2019	15–16 February 2020	
Group stage	Matchday 3	28 November 2019	22–23 February 2019	
Group stage	Matchday 4	28 November 2019	29 February–1 March 2020	
Group stage	Matchday 5	28 November 2019	21–22 March 2020	
Group stage	Matchday 6	28 November 2019	28–29 March 2020	
Knockout phase	Quarter-finals	31 March 2020	25–26 April 2020	2–3 May 2020
Knockout phase	Final four	5 May 2020	23–24 May 2020	

== Qualification stage ==
The qualification stage consists of three rounds, which will be played as two-legged ties using a home-and-away system. In the draws for each round, teams are allocated into two pots, with teams from Pot 1 facing teams from Pot 2. The winners of each pairing (highlighted in bold) will qualify for the following round.

For each round, teams listed first will play the first leg at home. In some cases, teams agree to play both matches at the same venue.

=== Round 1 ===
A total of 32 teams entered the draw for the first qualification round, which was held on Tuesday, 16 July 2019. The draw seeding pots were composed as follows:

Pot 1	Pot 2
(Croatia) RK Dubrava; (Slovenia) RD Riko Ribnica; (Romania) HC Dobrogea Sud Constanța; (Israel) Maccabi Rishon LeZion; (Iceland) FH Hafnarfjordur; (Russia) HC Spartak Moscow; (Czech Republic) SSK Talent M.A.T. Plzeň; (Ukraine) ZTR Zaporizhia; (Serbia) RK Vojvodina; (Belgium) HC Achilles Bocholt; (Greece) Olympiacos S.F.P.; (Austria) Alpla HC Hard; (Netherlands) KRAS/Volendam; (Kosovo) KH BESA Famgas; (Luxembourg) Handball Esch; (Turkey) Beşiktaş Aygaz	(Estonia) Põlva Serviti; (Lithuania) Dragūnas Klaipėda; (Italy) SSV Bozen Loacker; (United Kingdom) London GD; (Georgia (country)) B.S.B. Batumi; (Montenegro) RK Lovćen; (Bosnia and Herzegovina) RK Borac m:tel; (Malta) Swieqi Phoenix Handball Club; (Serbia) RK Metaloplastika; (Belgium) HC Visé BM; (Turkey) CIP Travel Antalyaspor A.Ş.; (Croatia) RK Poreč; (Sweden) HK Malmö; (Switzerland) Pfadi Winterthur; (Iceland) Haukar Handball; (Austria) SG Handball West Wien

The first legs were played on 31 August–1 September and the second legs were played on 7–8 September 2019. Some teams agreed to play both matches in the same venue.

Team 1	Agg.	Team 2	1st leg	2nd leg
KH BESA Famgas (Kosovo)	54–67 ^{1}	(Switzerland) **Pfadi Winterthur**	24–33	30–34
**Olympiacos S.F.P.** (Greece)	60–46	(Bosnia and Herzegovina) RK Borac m:tel	30–21	30–25
**HK Malmö** (Sweden)	61–52	(Russia) HC Spartak Moscow	31–23	30–29
**Maccabi Rishon LeZion** (Israel)	57–48 ^{2}	(Lithuania) Dragūnas Klaipėda	34–28	23–20
**RK Poreč** (Croatia)	60–51	(Netherlands) KRAS/Volendam	29–23	31–28
HC Visé BM (Belgium)	48–56	(Iceland) **FH Hafnarfjordur**	27–27	21–29
**RD Riko Ribnica** (Slovenia)	59–48	(Estonia) Põlva Serviti	32–22	27–26
**ZTR Zaporizhia** (Ukraine)	78–34 ^{3}	(United Kingdom) London GD	39–20	39–14
CIP Travel Antalyaspor A.Ş. (Turkey)	40–53	(Romania) **HC Dobrogea Sud Constanța**	24–24	16–29
SSV Bozen Loacker (Italy)	50–51	(Austria) **Alpla HC Hard**	24–23	26–28
Beşiktaş Aygaz (Turkey)	49–49 (a)^{4}	(Serbia) **RK Metaloplastika**	25–25	24–24
Haukar Handball (Iceland)	45–51	(Czech Republic) **SSK Talent M.A.T. Plzeň**	20–25	25–26
**HC Achilles Bocholt** (Belgium)	48–47	(Austria) SG Handball West Wien	26–22	22–25
**Handball Esch** (Luxembourg)	80–38 ^{5}	(Georgia (country)) B.S.B. Batumi	38–16	42–22
**RK Vojvodina** (Serbia)	79–52 ^{6}	(Montenegro) RK Lovćen	38–23	41–29
**RK Dubrava** (Croatia)	81–43 ^{7}	(Malta) Swieqi Phoenix Handball Club	45–22	36–21

Notes

^{1} Both legs were hosted by KH BESA Famgas.
^{2} Both legs were hosted by Maccabi Rishon LeZion.
^{3} Both legs were hosted by ZTR Zaporizhia.
^{4} Both legs were hosted by Beşiktaş Aygaz.
^{5} Both legs were hosted by Handball Esch.
^{6} Both legs were hosted by RK Vojvodina.
^{7} Both legs were hosted by RK Dubrava.

=== Round 2 ===
The first legs were played on 5–6 October and the second legs were played on 12–13 October 2019. Some teams agreed to play both matches in the same venue.

Team 1	Agg.	Team 2	1st leg	2nd leg
SCM Politehnica Timișoara (Romania)	57–58	(Greece) **Olympiacos S.F.P.**	31–29	26–29
**PAUC Handball** (France)	64–46	(Croatia) RK Poreč	38–26	26–20
**SSK Talent M.A.T. Plzeň** (Czech Republic)	58–44 ^{1}	(Israel) Hapoel Ashdod	32–23	26–21
RD Riko Ribnica (Slovenia)	56–61	(Belarus) **SKA Minsk**	33–33	23–28
**HK Malmö** (Sweden)	64–56	(Iceland) Selfoss	33–27	31–29
**Alpla HC Hard** (Austria)	60–59 (p)^{3}	(Denmark) Skjern Håndbold	25–26	26–25
RK Vojvodina (Serbia)	43–58	(Spain) **CB Ademar León**	20–28	23–30
**SL Benfica** (Portugal)	63–44 ^{2}	(Croatia) RK Dubrava	29–28	34–16
RK Metaloplastika (Serbia)	53–64	(Slovenia) **RK Gorenje Velenje**	24–32	29–32
HC Butel Skopje (North Macedonia)	42–43	(Ukraine) **ZTR Zaporizhia**	18–14	24–29
**KS Azoty-Puławy** (Poland)	57–53	(Luxembourg) Handball Esch	31–28	26–25
HC Dobrogea Sud Constanța (Romania)	43–43 (a)	(Hungary) **Csurgói KK**	22–24	21–19
**NMC Górnik Zabrze** (Poland)	50–48	(Israel) Maccabi Rishon LeZion	29–26	21–22
**HC Achilles Bocholt** (Belgium)	59–52	(Switzerland) Wacker Thun	34–33	25–19
FH Hafnarfjordur (Iceland)	52–58	(Norway) **ØIF Arendal Elite**	25–30	27–28
**Pfadi Winterthur** (Switzerland)	72–37	(North Macedonia) RK Pelister	39–16	33–21

Notes

^{1} Both legs were hosted by Talent M.A.T. Plzeň.
^{2} Both legs were hosted by SL Benfica.
^{3} A penalty shootout – which lasted nine shots for each team – was necessary to determine the winner of the tie between ALPLA HC Hard and Skjern Handbold. ALPLA HC Hard won 9–8.

=== Round 3 ===
A total of 32 teams entered the draw for the third qualification round, which was held on Tuesday, 15 October 2019. The draw seeding pots were composed as follows:

Pot 1	Pot 2
(Croatia) RK Nexe; (Denmark) Bjerringbro-Silkeborg; (Denmark) TTH Holstebro; (Spain) BM Logroño La Rioja; (Spain) Liberbank Cuenca; (France) Chambéry Savoie Mont-Blanc; (France) HBC Nantes; (France) USAM Nîmes Gard; (Germany) Füchse Berlin; (Germany) MT Melsungen; (Germany) Rhein-Neckar Löwen; (Germany) SC Magdeburg; (Hungary) Balatonfüredi KSE; (Hungary) Grundfos Tatabánya KC; (North Macedonia) Metalurg Skopje; (Poland) Gwardia Opole	(Austria) Alpla HC Hard; (Belgium) HC Achilles Bocholt; (Belarus) SKA Minsk; (Czech Republic) SSK Talent M.A.T. Plzeň; (Spain) CB Ademar León; (France) PAUC Handball; (Greece) Olympiacos S.F.P.; (Hungary) Csurgói KK; (Norway) ØIF Arendal Elite; (Poland) KS Azoty-Puławy; (Poland) NMC Górnik Zabrze; (Portugal) SL Benfica; (Slovenia) RK Gorenje Velenje; (Switzerland) Pfadi Winterthur; (Sweden) HK Malmö; (Ukraine) ZTR Zaporizhia

The first legs were played on 16–17 November and the second legs were played on 23–24 November 2019.

Team 1	Agg.	Team 2	1st leg	2nd leg
Balatonfüredi KSE (Hungary)	51–56	(Spain) **CB Ademar León**	30–27	21–29
SKA Minsk (Belarus)	45–61	(Germany) **Rhein-Neckar Löwen**	28–32	17–29
NMC Górnik Zabrze (Poland)	51–74	(Germany) **SC Magdeburg**	25–37	26–37
Pfadi Winterthur (Switzerland)	63–70	(Denmark) **Bjerringbro-Silkeborg**	33–36	30–34
Chambéry Savoie Mont-Blanc (France)	43–44	(France) **PAUC Handball**	20–25	23–19
**Liberbank Cuenca** (Spain)	59–50	(Austria) Alpla HC Hard	34–18	25–32
**Grundfos Tatabánya KC** (Hungary)	53–51	(Ukraine) ZTR Zaporizhia	27–24	26–27
**HBC Nantes** (France)	60–59	(Norway) ØIF Arendal Elite	30–29	30–30
RK Nexe (Croatia)	54–54 (a)	(Portugal) **SL Benfica**	30–26	24–28
**RK Gorenje Velenje** (Slovenia)	47–42	(North Macedonia) Metalurg Skopje	24–19	23–23
HK Malmö (Sweden)	53–61	(Germany) **Füchse Berlin**	27–34	26–27
**MT Melsungen** (Germany)	52–47	(Greece) Olympiacos S.F.P.	32–28	20–19
SSK Talent M.A.T. Plzeň (Czech Republic)	46–67	(Denmark) **TTH Holstebro**	25–30	21–37
**BM Logroño La Rioja** (Spain)	73–57	(Belgium) HC Achilles Bocholt	37–26	36–31
**Gwardia Opole** (Poland)	54–53	(Poland) KS Azoty-Puławy	26–24	28–29
Csurgói KK (Hungary)	48–54	(France) **USAM Nîmes Gard**	28–25	20–29

== Group stage ==
The draw of the EHF Cup group stage will take place on Thursday, 28 November 2019. The 16 teams allocated into four pots will be drawn into four groups of four teams.

In each group, teams play against each other home-and-away in a round-robin format. The matchdays are 8–9 February, 15–16 February, 22–23 February, 29 February–1 March, 21–22 March and 28–29 March 2020.

On 25 March 2020, the EHF announced that no matches will be played before June due to the coronavirus pandemic.

In the group stage, teams are ranked according to points (2 points for a win, 1 point for a draw, 0 points for a loss). After completion of the group stage, if two or more teams have scored the same number of points, the ranking will be determined as follows:

1. Highest number of points in matches between the teams directly involved;
2. Superior goal difference in matches between the teams directly involved;
3. Highest number of goals scored in matches between the teams directly involved (or in the away match in case of a two-team tie);
4. Superior goal difference in all matches of the group;
5. Highest number of plus goals in all matches of the group;

If the ranking of one of these teams is determined, the above criteria are consecutively followed until the ranking of all teams is determined. If no ranking can be determined, a decision shall be obtained by EHF through drawing of lots.

During the group stage, only criteria 4–5 apply to determine the provisional ranking of teams.

=== Group A ===
Pos	Team	Pld	W	D	L	GF	GA	GD	Pts	Qualification	BEN	MEL	BJE	GWA
1	(Portugal) SL Benfica	4	4	0	0	121	97	+24	8	Knockout stage	—	29–26	Cancelled	29–24
2	(Germany) MT Melsungen	4	2	0	2	118	118	0	4	Ranking of the second-placed teams	Cancelled	—	35–33	26–21
3	(Denmark) Bjerringbro-Silkeborg	4	2	0	2	124	128	−4	4	Eliminated	24–33	35–31	—	Cancelled
4	(Poland) Gwardia Opole	4	0	0	4	97	117	−20	0	Eliminated	23–30	Cancelled	29–32	—

Updated to match(es) played on 29 February 2020. Source: EHF

=== Group B ===
Pos	Team	Pld	W	D	L	GF	GA	GD	Pts	Qualification	RNL	NIM	LIB	HOL
1	(Germany) Rhein-Neckar Löwen	4	4	0	0	136	111	+25	8	Knockout stage	—	32–31	36–25	Cancelled
2	(France) USAM Nîmes Gard	4	2	1	1	123	117	+6	5	Ranking of the second-placed teams	Cancelled	—	29–29	33–28
3	(Spain) Liberbank Cuenca	4	1	1	2	111	125	−14	3	Eliminated	28–33	Cancelled	—	29–27
4	(Denmark) TTH Holstebro (E)	4	0	0	4	110	127	−17	0	Eliminated	27–35	28–30	Cancelled	—

Updated to match(es) played on 29 February 2020. Source: EHF
(E) Eliminated

=== Group C ===
Pos	Team	Pld	W	D	L	GF	GA	GD	Pts	Qualification	MAG	NAN	GOR	ADE
1	(Germany) SC Magdeburg	4	4	0	0	123	109	+14	8	Knockout stage	—	29–28	32–26	Cancelled
2	(France) HBC Nantes	4	2	0	2	125	116	+9	4	Ranking of the second-placed teams	28–31	—	Cancelled	34–28
3	(Slovenia) Gorenje Velenje	4	2	0	2	110	115	−5	4	Eliminated	Cancelled	28–35	—	30–25
4	(Spain) Abanca Ademar León	4	0	0	4	103	121	−18	0	Eliminated	27–31	Cancelled	23–26	—

Updated to match(es) played on 1 March 2020. Source: EHF

=== Group D ===
Pos	Team	Pld	W	D	L	GF	GA	GD	Pts	Qualification	FUC	PAU	TAT	LOG
1	(Germany) Füchse Berlin	4	2	1	1	110	102	+8	5	Knockout stage	—	Cancelled	27–27	33–26
2	(France) PAUC Handball	4	1	2	1	102	100	+2	4	Ranking of the second-placed teams	23–25	—	26–22	Cancelled
3	(Hungary) Grundfos Tatabánya KC	4	1	2	1	99	102	−3	4	Eliminated	Cancelled	24–24	—	26–25
4	(Spain) BM Logroño La Rioja	4	1	1	2	106	113	−7	3	Eliminated	26–25	29–29	Cancelled	—

Updated to match(es) played on 1 March 2020. Source: EHF

=== Ranking of the second-placed teams ===
The top three second-placed teams will qualify to the quarter-finals. The ranking of the second-placed teams will be determined on the basis of the team's results in the group stage.

Pos	Grp	Team	Pld	W	D	L	GF	GA	GD	Pts	Qualification
1	B	(France) USAM Nîmes Gard	4	2	1	1	123	117	+6	5	Knockout stage
2	C	(France) HBC Nantes	4	2	0	2	125	116	+9	4	Knockout stage
3	D	(France) PAUC Handball	4	1	2	1	102	100	+2	4	Knockout stage
4	A	(Germany) MT Melsungen	4	2	0	2	118	118	0	4	Eliminated

Updated to match(es) played on 1 March 2020. Source: EHF
Rules for classification: Tiebreakers

== Knockout stage ==
=== Quarter-finals ===
The draw for the quarter-final pairings was scheduled to be held on Tuesday, 31 March, in the EHF headquarters in Vienna, but due to the postponed matches of the group stage, EHF will announce any further updates accordingly. On 24 April 2020 the matches were cancelled.

Team 1	Agg.	Team 2	1st leg	2nd leg
	–		–	–
	–		–	–
	–		–	–
	–		–	–

=== Final four ===
The eighth edition of the EHF Cup Finals in 2020 will be hosted by Füchse Berlin after the EHF Executive Committee decided to award the hosting rights to the German club at its meeting on 22 November 2019. The tournament was scheduled to take place at Max-Schmeling-Halle in Berlin, on 23 and 24 May 2020, but was rescheduled to 29 and 30 August 2020. On 24 April 2020 EHF announced that in agreement with the organizers, Füchse Berlin, the MEN’S EHF Cup Finals scheduled for 29 and 30 August are cancelled. The tournament will not be carried out.

==== Bracket ====
Semifinals

Final
Third place

==== Semifinals ====
TBD	Cancelled	TBD

TBD	Cancelled	TBD

==== Third place game ====
LSF1	Cancelled	LSF2

==== Final ====
WSF1	Cancelled	WFF2

== Top goalscorers ==
As of 29 February 2020

Rank	Player	Club	Goals
1	(Egypt) Mohammad Sanad	(France) USAM Nîmes Gard	49
2	(Denmark) Magnus Bramming	(Denmark) TTH Holstebro	44
2	(Serbia) Petar Đorđić	(Portugal) S.L. Benfica	44

== See also ==
- 2019–20 EHF Champions League
- 2019–20 EHF Challenge Cup
