= CB Ciudad de Logroño =

Spanish handball club

- Full name: Club Balonmano Ciudad de Logroño
- Founded: 2003
- Arena: Palacio de los Deportes de La Rioja, Logroño
- Capacity: 3,809
- President: Segundo José Viguera
- Head coach: Miguel Ángel Velasco
- League: Liga ASOBAL
- 2024–25: 5th
Home	Away

CB Ciudad de Logroño is a team of handball based in Logroño, Spain. It plays in Liga ASOBAL.

Location of BM Logrono La Rioja

== History ==
The club was founded in 2003. Since 2006, it has been playing in the Spanish first division, the Liga ASOBAL. In the 2008/09 season, the team took 7th place, so it was able to start in the international field for the first time: the EHF Cup. In the 2012/13 first-class season, the team took 3rd place in the league and was thus allowed to start in the EHF Champions League for the first time.

== Crest, colours, supporters ==
=== Naming history ===
Name	Period
Darien Logroño	2003–2006
Naturhouse La Rioja	2006–2017
CBM La Rioja	2017–2018
BM Logroño La Rioja	2018–present

=== Kits ===
HOME
2012–16	2017–19

AWAY
2012–14	2014–15	2019–20

== Sports Hall information ==
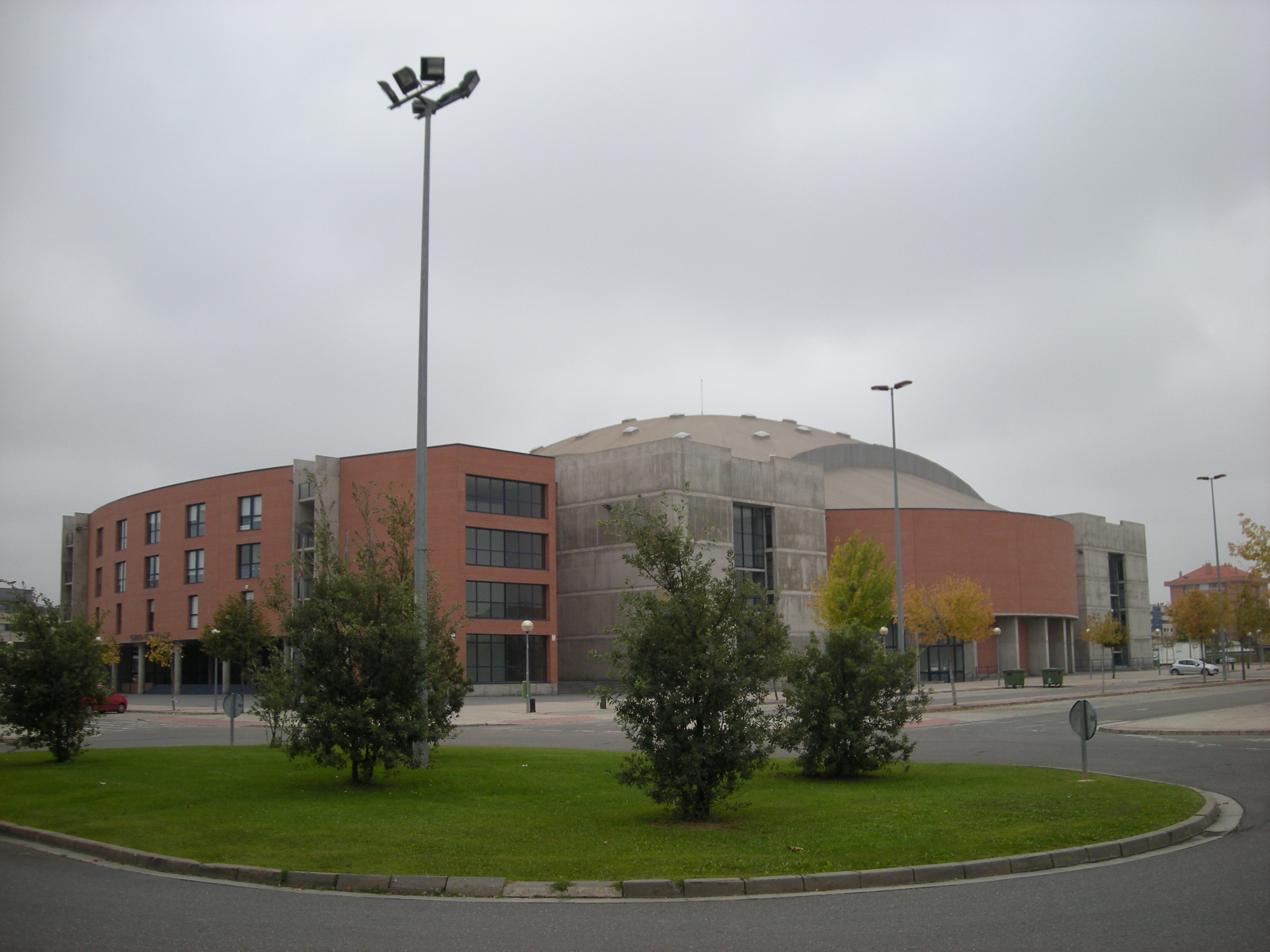
Home hall: Palacio de los Deportes de La Rioja

- Name: – Palacio de los Deportes de La Rioja
- City: – Logroño
- Capacity: – 3809
- Address: – Av. del Moncalvillo, 2, 26008, Logroño, Spain

== Team ==
=== Current squad ===
Squad for the 2022–23 season

BM Logrono La Rioja

Goalkeepers

- 1 (Spain) Jorge Pérez Molina
- 16 (Belarus) Aliaksandr Markelau
- 90 (Spain) Javier Romeo

Left Wingers

- 10 (Spain) Alex Rubiño
- 75 (France) Mahamadou Keita

Right Wingers

- 26 (Spain) Eduardo Ortíz
- 34 (Spain) David Cadarso

Line Players

- 19 (Spain) Javier Rodríguez
- 22 (Brazil) Leonardo Domenech de Almeida
- 29 (Spain) Javier García López

Central Backs

- 7 (Spain) Álvaro Preciado Ramos
- 9 (Spain) Ismael El-Korchi
- 66 (Spain) Eduardo Cadarso

Left Backs

- 15 (Spain) Antonio Serradilla
- 37 (Spain) Oleg Kisselev Kisseleva
- 44 (Spain) Juan Palomino Morón

Right Backs

- 5 (Cuba) Ángel Jesús Rivero Noris

=== Technical staff ===
- Head Coach: (Spain) Miguel Ángel Velasco
- Assistant Coach: (Spain) José Ignacio Martínez Castillejo

=== Transfers ===
Transfers for the 2026–27 season

Joining

- (Italy) Nicolo D'Antino (RW) from (Spain) CB Cangas
- (Portugal) Gustavo Oliveira (LB) from (Portugal) S.L. Benfica
- (Argentina) Martín Jung (CB) from (France) US Ivry Handball
- Tomoki Ishida (LW) from Toyota Motor East Japan Regarosso Miyagi
- (Serbia) Luka Jevtić (RB) from (Serbia) RK Metaloplastika
- (Spain) Samuel Saiz (LB) from (Spain) CB Ademar León

Leaving

- (Hungary) Andrej Pergel (LB) to (Romania) Dinamo București
- (Bosnia and Herzegovina) Nemanja Peštić (LB) to (Spain) CB Cangas
- (Croatia) Josip Zaja (RB) to (France) Chambéry SMBH
- (Spain) David Cadarso (RW) to (Spain) CB Caserío Ciudad Real

=== Transfer History ===
Transfers for the 2025–26 season

Joining

- (Argentina) Francisco Andrés Lombardi (LW) from (Spain) AD Ciudad de Guadalajara
- (Serbia) Ivan Popović (LP) from (Spain) CB Ademar León
- (Bosnia and Herzegovina) Nemanja Peštić (LB) from (Serbia) RK Vranje
- (Spain) Álvaro Martínez (LP) from (Spain) Recoletas Atlético Valladolid
- (Spain) Aitor García Dúo (LP) from (Spain) Helvetia Anaitasuna
- (Spain) Marcos Cancio (GK) from (Spain) Helvetia Anaitasuna

Leaving

- (Brazil) Thiago Ponciano (LB) to (Romania) SCM Politehnica Timișoara
- (Algeria) Salim Mezaza (GK) to (France) Grand Besançon Doubs Handball
- (Cuba) Ángel Jesús Rivero Noris (RB) to (Spain) CB Cangas
- (Togo) Abdoula Modi (LP) to (Spain) BM Benidorm
- (Spain) Rolando Uríos González (LP) to (Denmark) Fredericia HK
- (Spain) Ismael El-Korchi (CB) to (Portugal) S.L. Benfica
- (Spain) Xavi Tuà Hernández (LW) to (Spain) CD Bidasoa

Transfers for the 2022–23 season

Joining

- (France) Mahamadou Keita (LW) from (Portugal) S.L. Benfica
- (Spain) Juan Palomino Morón (LB) from (Spain) FC Barcelona
- (Spain) Álvaro Preciado Ramos (CB) from (Spain) BM Cisne
- (Spain) Javier García López (LP) from (Spain) BM Villa de Aranda

Leaving

- (Brazil) Leonardo Terçariol (GK) to (Spain) BM Huesca
- (Brazil) Leonardo Domenech de Almeida (LP) to (Spain) Ángel Ximénez Puente Genil
- (Spain) Agustín Casado (CB) to (Germany) MT Melsungen
- (Spain) Tomás Moreira (LP) to (France) PAUC Handball
- (Spain) Mario Dorado (LW) to (Spain) CB Cangas
- (Spain) Ernesto Goñi Macua (LB) to (Spain) Helvetia Anaitasuna
- (Brazil) Leonardo Dutra (LB) to (North Macedonia) RK Vardar

== Previous squads ==
2019–2020 Team
Shirt No	Nationality	Player	Birth Date	Position
1	Spain	Jorge Pérez Molina	17 September 2000 (age 26)	Goalkeeper
2	Spain	Miguel Sánchez-Migallón	8 February 1995 (age 31)	Left Winger
5	Italy	Gianluca Dapiran	9 May 1994 (age 32)	Left Winger
6	Spain	Erik Balenciaga	10 May 1993 (age 33)	Central Back
9	Croatia	Tomislav Kušan	16 December 1994 (age 31)	Line Player
11	France	James Scott Junior	27 May 1996 (age 30)	Left Back
13	Hungary	Patrik Ligetvári	13 February 1996 (age 30)	Left Back
15	Spain	Ernesto Goñi Macua	15 November 2001 (age 24)	Left Back
19	Brazil	Gabriel Ceretta	12 June 1997 (age 29)	Right Back
22	Spain	Tomás Moreira	22 August 1992 (age 34)	Line Player
24	Serbia	Lazar Kukić	12 December 1995 (age 30)	Central Back
25	Spain	Sergey Hernández	17 June 1995 (age 31)	Goalkeeper
26	Spain	Eduardo Ortíz Badillo	12 December 2002 (age 23)	Right Winger
33	Spain	Eduardo Cadarso	13 February 1999 (age 27)	Central Back
34	Spain	David Cadarso	14 December 2001 (age 24)	Right Winger
41	Spain	Imanol Garciandia	30 April 1995 (age 31)	Right Back
77	Brazil	Rudolph Hackbarth	10 March 1994 (age 32)	Right Winger
90	Spain	Javier Romeo	1 June 1990 (age 36)	Goalkeeper

2016–2017 Team
Shirt No	Nationality	Player	Birth Date	Position
1	Sweden	Richard Kappelin	30 September 1983 (age 43)	Goalkeeper
2	Spain	Miguel Sánchez-Migallón	8 February 1995 (age 31)	Left Winger
4	Spain	Albert Rocas	16 June 1982 (age 44)	Right Winger
5	Spain	Iñaki Peciña	31 May 1988 (age 38)	Line Player
8	Spain	Ángel Montoro	10 April 1989 (age 37)	Right Back
11	Spain	Pablo Cacheda	9 January 1992 (age 34)	Central Back
12	Spain	Gurutz Aguinagalde	26 October 1977 (age 49)	Goalkeeper
13	Spain	Luis Felipe Jiménez Reina	12 June 1989 (age 37)	Right Back
14	Spain	Victor Vigo Gerpe	9 May 1984 (age 42)	Central Back
17	Spain	Rubén Garabaya	15 September 1978 (age 48)	Line Player
18	Spain	Carlos Molina	31 May 1991 (age 35)	Left Back
22	Spain	Javier García Rubio	7 January 1990 (age 36)	Line Player
23	Brazil	Haniel Langaro	7 March 1995 (age 31)	Left Back
24	Spain	Javier Muñoz	22 May 1992 (age 34)	Right Winger
32	Spain	Ángel Fernández Pérez	16 September 1988 (age 38)	Left Winger
33	Spain	Eduardo Cadarso	13 February 1999 (age 27)	Central Back
41	Spain	Imanol Garciandia	30 April 1995 (age 31)	Right Back
90	Spain	Javier Romeo	1 June 1990 (age 36)	Goalkeeper
91	Egypt	Mohammad Sanad	16 January 1991 (age 35)	Right Winger
95	Serbia	Lazar Kukić	12 December 1995 (age 30)	Central Back

2014–2015 Team
Shirt No	Nationality	Player	Birth Date	Position
2	Spain	Miguel Sánchez-Migallón	8 February 1995 (age 31)	Left Winger
4	Brazil	Thiagus Petrus	25 January 1989 (age 37)	Left Back
6	Spain	Juanín García	28 August 1977 (age 49)	Left Winger
11	Spain	Luis Felipe Jiménez Reina	12 June 1989 (age 37)	Right Back
12	Spain	Gurutz Aguinagalde	26 October 1977 (age 49)	Goalkeeper
14	Spain	Victor Vigo Gerpe	9 May 1984 (age 42)	Central Back
16	Spain	Jorge Gomez Lite	6 June 1989 (age 37)	Goalkeeper
17	Spain	Rubén Garabaya	15 September 1978 (age 48)	Line Player
18	Spain	Javier Romeo	1 June 1990 (age 36)	Goalkeeper
21	Sweden	Philip Stenmalm	3 March 1992 (age 34)	Left Back
22	Spain	Albert Rocas	16 June 1982 (age 44)	Right Winger
23	Spain	Pablo Cacheda	9 January 1992 (age 34)	Central Back
24	Spain	Diego Martin Santamaria	25 July 1993 (age 33)	Left Winger
26	SpainHungary	Pedro Rodríguez Álvarez	22 August 1990 (age 36)	Right Winger
32	Spain	Ángel Fernández Pérez	16 September 1988 (age 38)	Left Winger
37	Spain	Javier García Rubio	7 January 1990 (age 36)	Line Player
59	Spain	Ángel Romero Rodríguez	5 June 1984 (age 42)	Line Player
89	Denmark	Patrick Lykke Eilert	10 April 1989 (age 37)	Right Back

2012–2013 Team
Shirt No	Nationality	Player	Birth Date	Position
1	Spain	Jorge Martinez Martinez	9 August 1977 (age 49)	Goalkeeper
4	Brazil	Thiagus Petrus	25 January 1989 (age 37)	Left Back
5	Spain	Niko Mindegía	19 July 1988 (age 38)	Central Back
6	Spain	Unai Arrieta Aizpurua	14 January 1981 (age 45)	Left Winger
7	Spain	Miguel Ángel Velasco	20 March 1984 (age 42)	Central Back
8	Spain	Dario Ajo Villarraso	2 December 1989 (age 36)	Line Player
9	SpainRussia	Aleksandr Tiumentsev	4 October 1983 (age 43)	Central Back
10	Cuba	Jorge Pabán	29 September 1981 (age 45)	Right Back
11	Spain	Víctor Hugo López	23 November 1982 (age 43)	Right Back
14	Spain	Arturo Martinez D'Amore	1 February 1990 (age 36)	Left Winger
15	Spain	Alvaro Bozalongo Ruiz	1 January 1989 (age 37)	Line Player
17	Spain	Rubén Garabaya	15 September 1978 (age 48)	Line Player
18	Spain	Javier Romeo	1 June 1990 (age 36)	Goalkeeper
19	Spain	Jon Ramiro Perez	24 February 1993 (age 33)	Line Player
20	Spain	Pedro Fuentes Sanchez-Migallon	22 June 1986 (age 40)	Line Player
21	Spain	David Cuartero Sánchez	10 September 1985 (age 41)	Right Winger
22	Spain	Daniel Tolmos	30 June 1994 (age 32)	Central Back
24	Serbia	Marko Ćuruvija	24 July 1981 (age 45)	Left Winger
26	SpainHungary	Pedro Rodríguez Álvarez	22 August 1990 (age 36)	Right Winger
45	CubaQatar	Rafael Capote	5 October 1987 (age 39)	Left Back
86	Brazil	Ales Abrao Silva	2 June 1986 (age 40)	Line Player

== Retired numbers ==
BM Logrono La Rioja retired numbers
N°	Nationality	Player	Position	Tenure
12	(Spain)	Gurutz Aguinagalde	Goalkeeper	2005–2018
17	(Spain)	Rubén Garabaya	Line Player	2010–2018

== Honours ==
- Copa del Rey: 0
  - Runners-up: 2013, 2017, 2023
- Supercopa ASOBAL: 0
  - Runners-up: 2013

== Season by season ==
Season	Tier	Division	Pos.	Notes
2003–04	3	1ª Nacional	1st	Promoted
2004–05	2	Honor B	7th	
2005–06	2	Honor B	2nd	Promoted
2006–07	1	ASOBAL	14th	
2007–08	1	ASOBAL	12th	
2008–09	1	ASOBAL	7th	
2009–10	1	ASOBAL	5th	
2010–11	1	ASOBAL	9th	
2011–12	1	ASOBAL	7th	
2012–13	1	ASOBAL	3rd	
2013–14	1	ASOBAL	2nd	
2014–15	1	ASOBAL	2nd	
2015–16	1	ASOBAL	2nd	
2016–17	1	ASOBAL	3rd	
2017–18	1	ASOBAL	4th	
2018–19	1	ASOBAL	3rd	
2019–20	1	ASOBAL	3rd	
2020–21	1	ASOBAL	3rd	
2021–22	1	ASOBAL	6th	
2022–23	1	ASOBAL	5th	
2023–24	1	ASOBAL	4th	
2024–25	1	ASOBAL	5th	

== European record ==
Season	Competition	Round	Club	1st leg	2nd leg	Aggregate
2012–13	EHF Cup	Round 3	(Serbia) Vojvodina	28–19	22–26	50–45
2013–14	EHF Champions League	Group Stage	(Germany) HSV Hamburg	24–33	27–34	5th place
2013–14	EHF Champions League	Group Stage	(Germany) Flensburg	32–32	25–37	5th place
2013–14	EHF Champions League	Group Stage	(Slovenia) Gorenje	34–31	28–33	5th place
2013–14	EHF Champions League	Group Stage	(Denmark) Aalborg	25–23	24–28	5th place
2013–14	EHF Champions League	Group Stage	(Sweden) HK Drott	38–34	35–35	5th place
2014–15	EHF Champions League	Group Stage	(Germany) THW Kiel	30–34	32–34	4th place
2014–15	EHF Champions League	Group Stage	(France) Paris Saint-Germain	35–32	25–32	4th place
2014–15	EHF Champions League	Group Stage	(Croatia) Zagreb	22–21	30–31	4th place
2014–15	EHF Champions League	Group Stage	(Belarus) HC Meshkov Brest	39–31	33–33	4th place
2014–15	EHF Champions League	Group Stage	(North Macedonia) Metalurg Skopje	31–26	28–29	4th place
2014–15	EHF Champions League	Last 16	(Hungary) MKB Veszprém	22–31	31–37	54–68
2015–16	EHF Champions League	Group Stage	(Belarus) HC Meshkov Brest	28–32	33–31	2nd place
2015–16	EHF Champions League	Group Stage	(Portugal) FC Porto	30–23	31–35	2nd place
2015–16	EHF Champions League	Group Stage	(Serbia) RK Vojvodina	31–22	31–26	2nd place
2015–16	EHF Champions League	Group Stage	(Slovakia) HT Tatran Prešov	37–29	21–19	2nd place
2015–16	EHF Champions League	Group Stage	(Russia) Chekhovskiye Medvedi	30–26	26–27	2nd place
2015–16	EHF Champions League	PO	(Ukraine) HC Motor Zaporizhzhia	30–31	37–39	67–70
2016–17	EHF Champions League	Group Stage	(France) Montpellier	31–30	27–37	2nd place
2016–17	EHF Champions League	Group Stage	(Norway) Elverum Håndball	32–27	28–21	2nd place
2016–17	EHF Champions League	Group Stage	(North Macedonia) Metalurg Skopje	31–25	23–24	2nd place
2016–17	EHF Champions League	Group Stage	(Slovakia) HT Tatran Prešov	33–27	27–30	2nd place
2016–17	EHF Champions League	Group Stage	(Russia) Chekhovskiye Medvedi	34–37	28–28	2nd place
2016–17	EHF Champions League	PO	(France) HBC Nantes	25–31	31–37	56–68
2017–18	EHF Cup	Round 3	(Belarus) SKA Minsk	28–36	35–30	63–66
2018–19	EHF Cup	Round 3	(Switzerland) Kadetten Schaffhausen	26–22	24–28	50–50
2019–20	EHF Cup	Round 3	(Belgium) HC Achilles Bocholt	37–26	36–31	73–57
2019–20	EHF Cup	Group Stage	(Hungary) Grundfos Tatabánya KC	Cancelled	25–26	4th place
2019–20	EHF Cup	Group Stage	(France) PAUC Handball	29–29	Cancelled	4th place
2019–20	EHF Cup	Group Stage	(Germany) Füchse Berlin	26–25	26–33	4th place
2021–22	EHF European League	First qualifying round	(Portugal) Aguas Santas Milaneza	34–28	26–26	60–54
2021–22	EHF European League	Second qualifying round	(Spain) Ademar León	34–30	27–28	61–58
2021–22	EHF European League	Group Stage	(Germany) SC Magdeburg	29–29	31–33	5th place
2021–22	EHF European League	Group Stage	(Sweden) IK Sävehof	29–30	31–43	5th place
2021–22	EHF European League	Group Stage	(Croatia) RK Nexe	31–30	30–31	5th place
2021–22	EHF European League	Group Stage	(Slovenia) RK Gorenje Velenje	31–26	31–32	5th place
2021–22	EHF European League	Group Stage	(France) PAUC	33–26	31–37	5th place
2022–23	EHF European League	First qualifying round	(Germany) TBV Lemgo	28–28	34–39	62–67
2023–24	EHF European League	Group stage	(Denmark) Bjerringbro-Silkeborg	28–29	25–34	4th place
2023–24	EHF European League	Group stage	(Serbia) RK Vojvodina	29–32	25–24	4th place
2023–24	EHF European League	Group stage	(North Macedonia) HC Alkaloid	29–29	27–28	4th place

== EHF ranking ==
As of 22 October 2026

Rank	Team	Points
73	(Luxembourg) HC Berchem	63
74	(Estonia) Põlva Serviti	62
75	(Greece) Bianco Monte Drama 1986	62
76	(Spain) BM Logrono La Rioja	62
77	(France) Chambéry Handball	60
78	(Iceland) FH	59
79	(Denmark) Bjerringbro-Silkeborg	58

== Former club members ==
=== Notable former players ===
- (Spain) Gurutz Aguinagalde (2005–2018)
- (Spain) Alberto Aguirrezabalaga (2007–2009)
- (Spain) Marc Amargant (2006–2011)
- (Spain) Jon Belaustegui (2007–2009)
- (Spain) Pablo Cacheda (2014–2018)
- (Spain) Agustín Casado (2020–2022)
- (Spain) David Cuartero Sánchez (2012–2013)
- (Spain) Juan del Arco (2017–2019)
- (Spain) Alex Dujshebaev (2010–2012)
- (Spain) Ángel Fernández Pérez (2013–2018)
- (Spain) Rubén Garabaya (2010–2018)
- (Spain) Javier García Rubio (2014–2017)
- (Spain) Juanín García (2014–2015)
- (Spain) Imanol Garciandia (2015–2020)
- (Spain) Gedeón Guardiola (2008–2009)
- (Spain) Isaías Guardiola (2005–2010)
- (Spain) Sergey Hernández (2018–2020)
- (Spain) Víctor Hugo López (2010–2013)
- (Spain) Cristian Malmagro (2015)
- (Spain) Josep Masachs (2006–2008, 2013–2014)
- (Spain) Niko Mindegía (2011–2013)
- (Spain) Carlos Molina (2015–2017)
- (Spain) Ángel Montoro (2016–2018)
- (Spain) Pablo Paredes (2017–2018)
- (Spain) Iñaki Peciña (2016–2017)
- (Spain) (Hungary) Pedro Rodríguez Álvarez (2011–2016)
- (Spain) Albert Rocas (2014–2018)
- (Spain) Miguel Sánchez-Migallón (2013–2021)
- (Spain) Joan Saubich (2013)
- (Spain) Antonio Serradilla (2020–)
- (Bosnia and Herzegovina) Nikola Prce (2011–2012)
- (Brazil) Ales Abrao Silva (2009–2013)
- (Brazil) Gabriel Ceretta (2019–2021)
- (Brazil) Fábio Chiuffa (2017–2018)
- (Brazil) Leonardo Domenech de Almeida (2013–2015)
- (Brazil) Leonardo Dutra (2021–2022)
- (Brazil) Oswaldo Guimarães (2020–2021)
- (Brazil) Rudolph Hackbarth (2019–2021)
- (Brazil) Haniel Langaro (2016–2017)
- (Brazil) Arthur Patrianova (2013–2014)
- (Brazil) Thiagus Petrus (2012–2015)
- (Brazil) Leonardo Terçariol (2021–2022)
- (Chile) (Italy) Marco Oneto (2007–2009)
- (Cape Verde) Délcio Pina (2020–2021)
- (Cuba) (Qatar) Rafael Capote (2011–2013)
- (Cuba) (Spain) Julio Fis (2007–2008)
- (Cuba) Jorge Pabán (2012–2014)
- (Czech Republic) Jakub Krupa (2017–2018)
- (Egypt) Mohammad Sanad (2016–2017)
- (Hungary) Bálint Fekete (2018–2019)
- (Hungary) Patrik Ligetvári (2019–2020)
- (Italy) Gianluca Dapiran (2019–2020)
- (Lithuania) Aidenas Malašinskas (2013–2015)
- (North Macedonia) Aco Jonovski (2015)
- (North Macedonia) Naumče Mojsovski (2007–2008)
- (Norway) Håvard Tvedten (2006–2008)
- (Russia) Pavel Bashkin (2008–2010)
- (Slovenia) Ognjen Backovič (2006–2007)
- (Slovenia) Gregor Lorger (2009–2011)
- (Slovenia) Rok Praznik (2010–2011)
- (Serbia) Marko Ćuruvija (2011–2013)
- (Serbia) Vanja Ilić (2018–2019)
- (Serbia) Nikola Kojić (2010–2011)
- (Serbia) Lazar Kukić (2017–2020)
- (Serbia) Stefan Terzić (2015–2016)
- (Switzerland) Thomas Gautschi (2008–2009)
- (Sweden) Richard Kappelin (2015–2017)
- (Sweden) Johan Petersson (2007)
- (Sweden) Philip Stenmalm (2014–2016)

=== Former coaches ===
Seasons	Coach	Country
2007–2018	Jota González	(Spain)
2018–	Miguel Ángel Velasco	(Spain)
