= Rubén Garabaya =

Spanish handball player (born 1978)

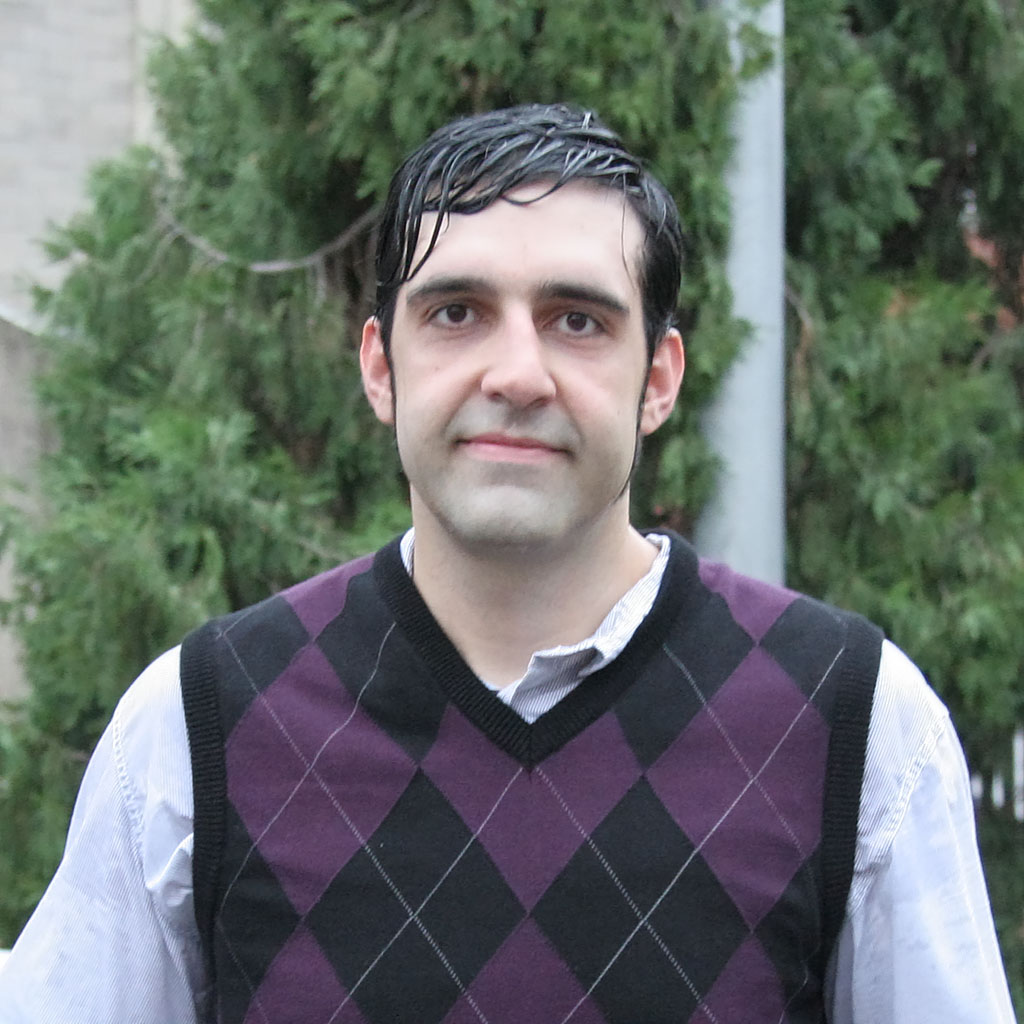
- Garabaya in 2008

Personal information
- Full name: Rubén Garabaya Arenas
- Nationality: Spanish
- Born: 15 September 1978 (age 48) Avilés, Asturias, Spain
- Height: 2.02 m (6 ft 7 1/2 in)

Sport
- Sport: Handball
- Position: Pivot

Senior clubs
- Years: Team
- –: BM Corvera
- 1997–1999: Caja España Ademar
- 1999–2001: Frigoríficos del Morrazo
- 2001–2007: BM Valladolid
- 2007–2010: FC Barcelona
- 2010–2018: Naturhouse La Rioja
National team
Years	Team	Apps	(Gls)
2001–2011	Spain	168	(318)

Teams managed
- 2018–2021: Naturhouse La Rioja assistant
- 2021: China (women)
- 2021–2022: Egypt (men) assistant
- 2022–2025: Unicaja Banco Sinfín
- 2025–2025: RK Eurofarm Pelister
- 2026–present: Georgia (men)
Medal record
Representing Spain
Olympic Games
Bronze medal – third place	2008 Beijing	Team
World Championship
Gold medal – first place	2005 Tunisia
Bronze medal – third place	2011 Sweden
European Championship
Silver medal – second place	2006 Switzerland
Mediterranean Games
Gold medal – first place	2005 Almería

Rubén Garabaya (born 15 September 1978) is a Spanish former handball player and former handball coach of RK Eurofarm Pelister. He was on the Spanish team that won the 2005 World Men's Handball Championship in Tunisia.

== Career ==
Garabaya started playing handball at BM Corvera, before joining Liga ASOBAL side Ademar León in 1997. Here he won the 1999 Copa ASOBAL and EHF Cup Winners' Cup. He then joined Frigoríficos del Morrazo for two years from 1999 to 2001, before joining BM Valladolid, the local rival of his former club Ademar León. Here he won the 2003 Copa ASOBAL and the 2005 and 2006 Copa del Rey de Balonmano.

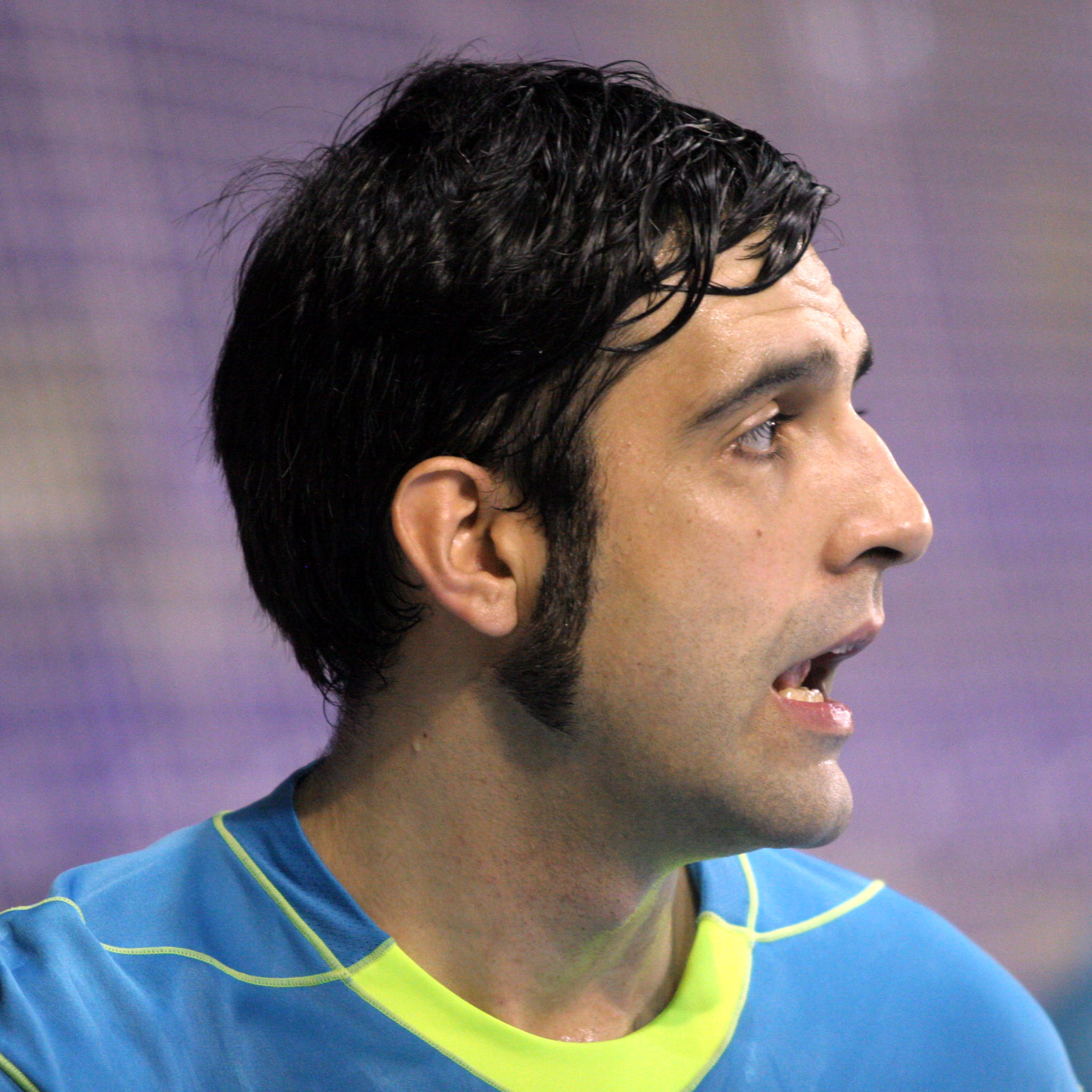
Garabaya on October 12, 2008, in Barcelona

In 2007 he joined FC Barcelona, where he won the 2009 and 2010 Copa del Rey. He also reached the final of the 2010 EHF Champions League, where they lost to German side THW Kiel.

In 2010 he joined Naturhouse La Rioja. He retired after the 2017-18 season.

=== National team ===
With the national team he played 168 matches. He won the 2005 World Men's Handball Championship in Tunisia with the Spanish team.

He participated at the 2008 Summer Olympics in Beijing as a member of the Spain men's national handball team. The team won a bronze medal, defeating Croatia in the third place playoff.

At the 2006 European Championship he won silver medals.

== Coaching career ==
When he retired he took over as the assistant coach at his former club, Naturhouse La Rioja.

In June 2021 he became the head coach of the Chinese women's team. He did however not last long and by October 2021 he instead became the assistant coach on the Egyptian men's national team, under Roberto García Parrondo. Here he won Silver medals at the 2022 Mediterranean Games and gold medals at the 2022 African Championship.

In 2022 he became the head coach of the Spanish Liga ASOBAL team Unicaja Banco Sinfín.
