= Lazar Kukić =

Serbian handball player (born 1995)

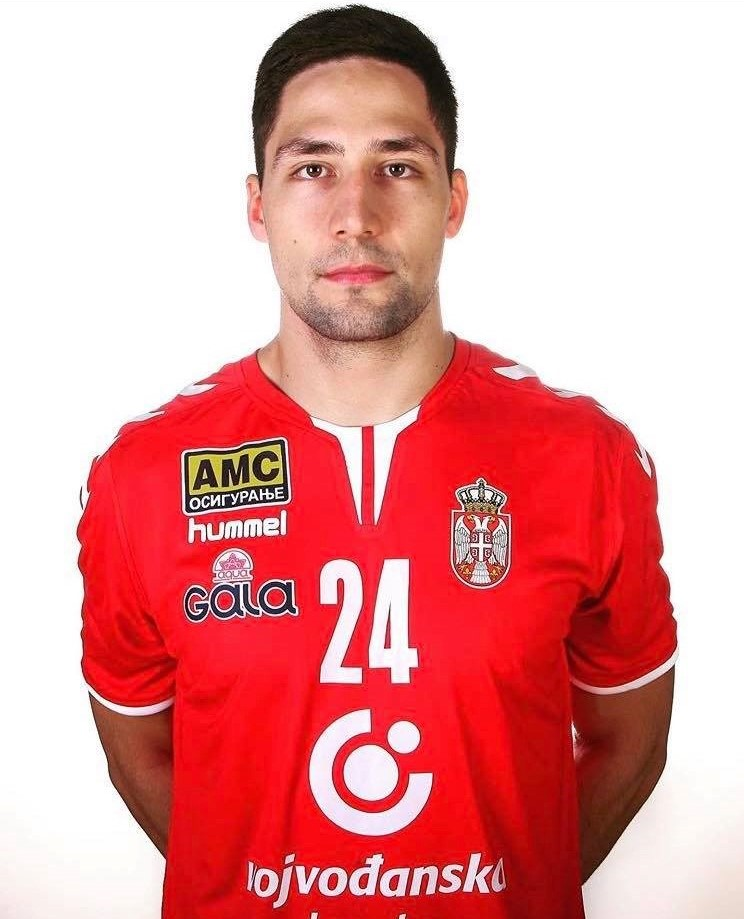
- Kukić in 2020

Personal information
- Full name: Lazar Kukić
- Nationality: Serbian
- Born: 12 December 1995 (age 30) Belgrade, Serbia, FR Yugoslavia
- Height: 1.88 m (6 ft 2 in)

Sport
- Sport: Handball
- Position: Centre back
- Current club: Pick Szeged
- Number: 34

Youth career
- Years: Team
- –: Partizan

Senior clubs
- Years: Team
- 2013–2016: Partizan
- 2017–2020: Logroño La Rioja
- 2020–2022: S.L. Benfica
- 2022–2024: Dinamo București
- 2024–present: Pick Szeged
National team
Years	Team	Apps	(Gls)
2016–present	Serbia	39	(92)
- Updated on 14 September 2024

Lazar Kukić (Serbian Cyrillic: Лазар Кукић; born 12 December 1995) is a Serbian handball player who plays for OTP Bank-Pick Szeged. He also represents the Serbia national team.

== Career ==
After coming through the youth system at Partizan, Kukić was promoted to the first team in the 2013–14 season. He signed with Spanish club BM Logroño La Rioja in early 2017.

A Serbia international since 2016, Kukić participated at the 2019 World Men's Handball Championship and 2020 European Men's Handball Championship.

== Honours ==
Benfica

- EHF European League: 2021–22
