= Mohammad Sanad =

Egyptian handball player (born 1991)

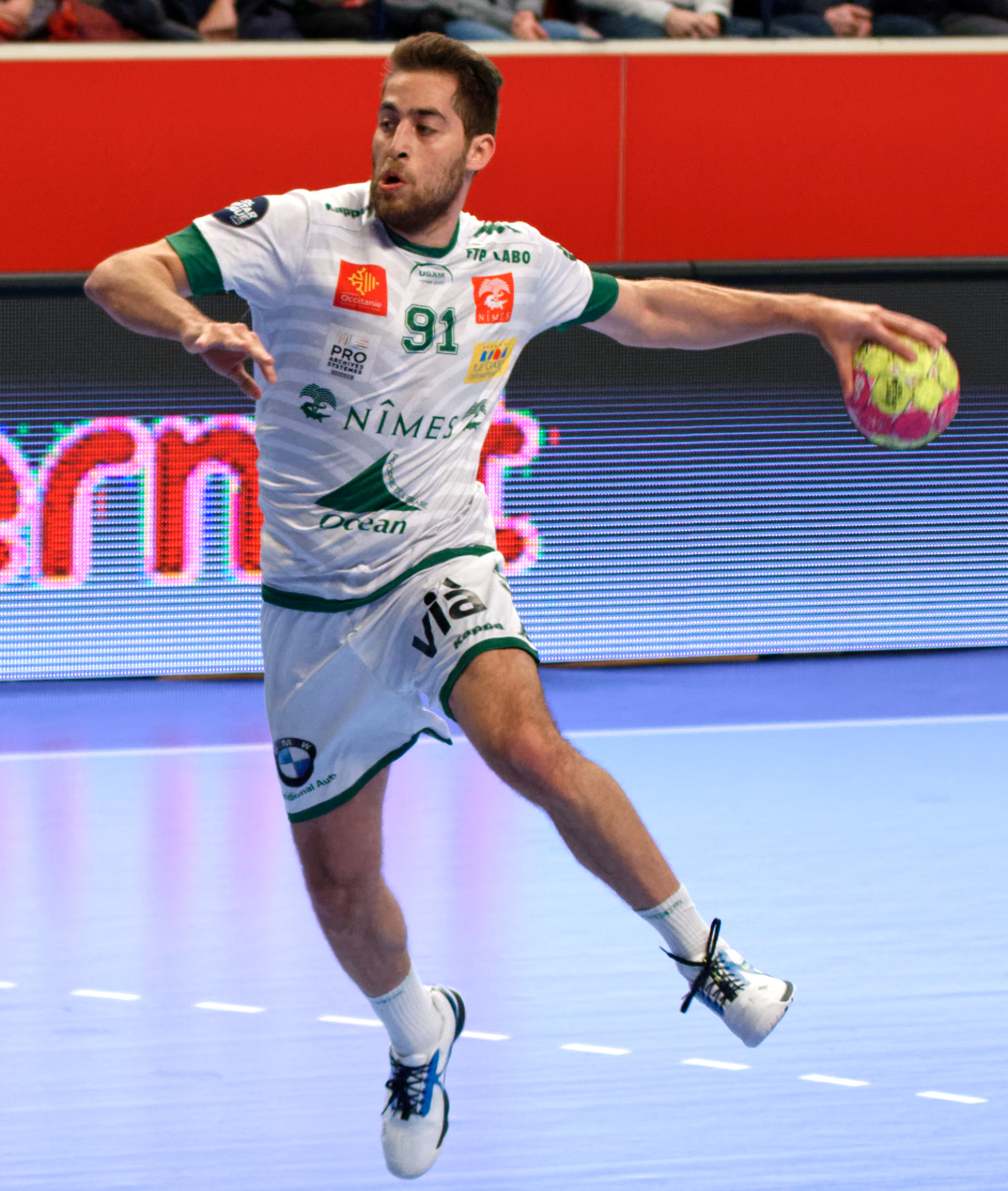
- Sanad in 2018

Personal information
- Full name: Mohammad Hisham Sanad
- Nationality: Egyptian
- Born: 16 January 1991 (age 35) Cairo, Egypt
- Height: 1.88 m (6 ft 2 in)

Sport
- Sport: Handball
- Position: Right wing
- Current club: USAM Nîmes Gard
- Number: 91

Youth career
- Years: Team
- 2000–: Heliopolis

Senior clubs
- Years: Team
- –2011: Heliopolis
- 2011–2013: Zamalek
- 2013–2015: Heliopolis
- 2015–2016: Komlói Bányász SK
- 2016–2017: CB Ciudad de Logroño
- 2017: Zamalek
- 2017–: USAM Nîmes Gard
National team
Years	Team		
–	Egypt U20		
–	Egypt	152	(373)
Medal record
African Championship
Gold medal – first place	2016 Egypt
Gold medal – first place	2020 Tunisia
Gold medal – first place	2022 Egypt
Gold medal – first place	2024 Egypt
Mediterranean Games
Silver medal – second place	2022 Oran	Team

Mohammad Hisham Sanad (Arabic: محمد هشام سند; born 16 January 1991) is an Egyptian handball player for USAM Nîmes Gard and the Egyptian national team.

He was a member of the Egypt men's national handball team at the 2016 Summer Olympics, and at the World Men's Handball Championship in 2017, 2019 and 2021.

== Honours ==
Club

Zamalek

- African Handball Champions League: 2011; runner-up 2012
- African Handball Cup Winners' Cup: 2011
- African Handball Super Cup: 2011, 2012

Heliopolis

- Egyptian Handball Cup: 2014

USAM Nîmes Gard

- Coupe de France: runner-up 2017–18

International

Egypt

- African Championship: 2016, 2020; runner-up 2018
- African Games: 2015
