= 2009–10 Croatian Premier League (handball) =

2008–09 Premijer Liga
- League: Croatian Premier Handball League
- Sport: Handball
- Games: 30
- Teams: 16

Regular season
- Season champions: Croatia Osiguranje Zagreb

Seasons
- ← 2008–09 2010–11 →

The 2009–10 Dukat Premijer Liga season is the nineteenth since its establishment and second in the Premier league format.

== Teams ==
Locations of teams participating in the 2008-09 season

Team	City	Venue (Capacity)
RK Bjelovar	Bjelovar	Školsko-sportska dvorana Bjelovar (1,500)
RK Buzet	Buzet	SD Buzet (300)
RK Croatia Osiguranje	Zagreb	Kutija Šibica (1,500), Arena Zagreb (15, 000)
RK Dubrava	Zagreb	ŠD Dubrava (1,260)
HRK Karlovac	Karlovac	SŠD Mladost (2,750)
RK Medveščak NFD	Zagreb	Kutija Šibica (1,500)
RK Međimurje	Čakovec	Dvorana Građevinske škole (1,150)
RK Moslavina Kutina	Kutina	ŠC Kutina (1,300)
RK Metković	Metković	Sportska dvorana Metković (3500)
RK NEXE	Našice	Sportska dvorana kralja Tomislava (2,500)
RK Osijek	Osijek	Zrinjevac Sport Hall (1,650)
RK Poreč	Poreč	SRC Veli Jože (1,000)
RK Siscia	Sisak	SD Brezovica (1,500)
RK Split	Split	Arena Gripe (3,000)
RK Varteks Di Caprio	Varaždin	Varaždin Arena (5,200)
RK Zamet	Rijeka	Centar Zamet (2,350)

== League table ==
Pos.	Team	Pld.	W	D	L	Goal+	Goal-	+/-	Pts.
1.	Croatia Osiguranje Zagreb	30	30	0	0	1137	750	+387	60
2.	NEXE Našice	30	24	1	5	1045	804	+241	49
3.	Siscia Sisak	30	19	2	9	879	813	+66	40
4.	Međimurje Čakovec	30	17	3	10	886	827	+59	37
5.	Poreč	30	17	2	11	863	823	+40	36
6.	Buzet	30	13	5	12	780	793	-13	31
7.	Karlovac	30	12	3	15	788	840	-52	27
8.	Dubrava Zagreb	30	12	3	15	821	904	-83	27
9.	Metković	30	11	4	15	788	859	-71	25 (-1)
10.	Bjelovar	30	11	2	17	821	868	-47	24
11.	Split	30	10	4	16	822	906	-84	24
12.	Zamet Rijeka	30	10	3	17	808	856	-48	23
13.	Varteks Di Caprio Varaždin	30	8	6	16	853	954	-101	22
14.	Medveščak NFD Zagreb	30	10	1	19	805	891	-86	21
15.	Moslavina Kutina	30	9	3	18	810	902	-92	21
16.	Osijek	30	6	0	24	843	959	-116	12

Qualified for the 2010-11 EHF Champions League	Qualified for the 2010-11 EHF Cup	Qualified for the 2010-11 EHF Challenge Cup	Relegated to 2010-11 1.HRL

== 2009-10 winning team ==
=== RK Croatia Osiguranje Zagreb ===
- GK: Marin Šego, Gorazd Škof, Ivan Pešić, Luka Bumbak
- LB: Tonči Valčić, Nikola Spelić, Jakov Gojun
- CB: Domagoj Duvnjak, Denis Špoljarić, Josip Valčić, Ivano Balić
- RB: Kiril Lazarov, Marko Kopljar
- RW: Mirza Džomba, Zlatko Horvat, Luka Raković
- LW: Ljubo Vukić, Manuel Štrlek
- LP: Frank Løke, Zoran Lubej, Gyula Gal, Marino Marić
- Head coach: Nenad Kljaić

Source: eurohandball.com

== Sources ==
- HRS
- Sport.net.hr
- Rk-zamet.hr
- Rijeka.hr
