= Igor Vori =

Croatian handball player (born 1980)

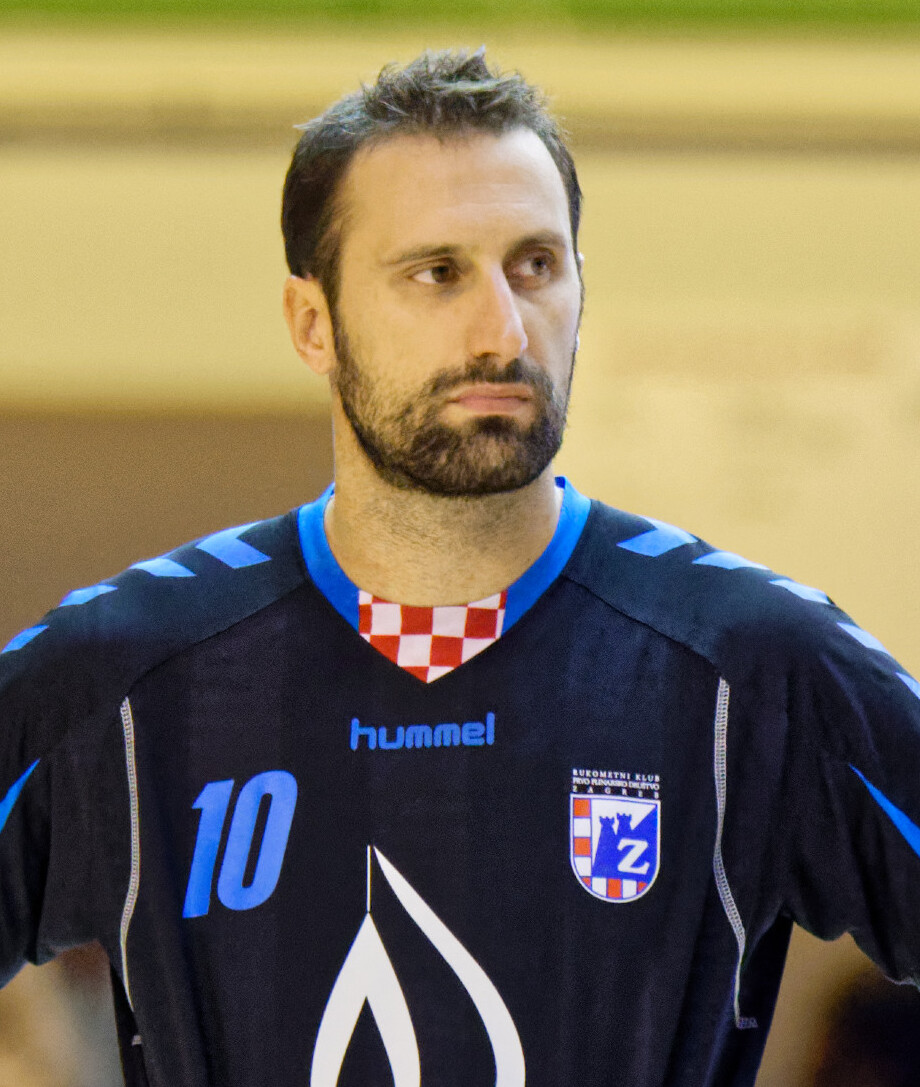
- Vori playing for RK Zagreb in 2016

Personal information
- Nationality: Croatian
- Born: 20 September 1980 (age 46) Zagreb, SR Croatia, SFR Yugoslavia
- Height: 2.03 m (6 ft 8 in)

Sport
- Sport: Handball
- Position: Pivot
- Current club: MRK Sesvete (manager)

Senior clubs
- Years: Team
- 1997–2001: RK Zagreb
- 2001–2002: Alpi Pallamano Prato
- 2002–2003: Pallamano Conversano
- 2003–2005: RK Zagreb
- 2005–2007: FC Barcelona
- 2007–2009: RK Zagreb
- 2009–2013: HSV Hamburg
- 2013–2016: Paris Saint-Germain
- 2016–2019: RK Zagreb
- 2022: Füchse Berlin
National team
Years	Team	Apps	(Gls)
2001–2018	Croatia	246	(590)

Teams managed
- 2018–2020: Croatia (assistant coach)
- 2020-2021: RK Zagreb
- 2022–: Croatia U21
- 2022–2023: TV Großwallstadt
- 2023–: MRK Sesvete
Medal record
Men's handball
Representing Croatia
Olympic Games
Gold medal – first place	2004 Athens	Team
Bronze medal – third place	2012 London	Team
World Championship
Gold medal – first place	2003 Portugal	Team
Silver medal – second place	2005 Tunisia	Team
Silver medal – second place	2009 Croatia	Team
Bronze medal – third place	2013 Spain	Team
European Championship
Silver medal – second place	2008 Norway	Team
Silver medal – second place	2010 Austria	Team
Bronze medal – third place	2012 Serbia	Team
Mediterranean Games
Gold medal – first place	2018 Tarragona	Assistant coach

Igor Vori (born 20 September 1980) is a Croatian handball coach and former player who is currently the coach of Croatian club MRK Sesvete. Regarded as one of the best line players in handball history and renowned for his defensive and attacking abilities, Vori won the 2003 World Championship and the Olympic gold medal in 2004 with the Croatian national team, and over thirty club titles playing for RK Zagreb, FC Barcelona, HSV Hamburg and Paris Saint-Germain. He has the second-most appearances for the Croatian national team with 246 caps.

Voted most valuable player at the 2009 World Championship and best defensive player at the 2008 European Championship, Vori also earned two World Championship silver medals and one bronze medal (2005, 2009, 2013), two silver European Championship medals and one bronze medal (2008, 2010, 2012), and one Olympic bronze medal (2012) with the Croatian national team. He was previously the sporting director of the Croatian national teams.

He was inducted into the EHF Hall of Fame in 2024.

== Club career ==
Vori began his senior handball career with RK Zagreb in 1997. After winning four league and three cup titles, he moved to Italian club Pallamano Prato in 2001 and joined Pallamano Conversano the following year, winning the Italian league and cup with the latter. In 2003, Vori returned to RK Zagreb, before joining Spanish team FC Barcelona in 2005. He won the league, cup and super cup with the club, before returning to RK Zagreb in 2007. Following two seasons with the team, Vori transferred to German club HSV Hamburg, where he won league and cup titles, and the EHF Champions League.

In 2013, Vori moved to French club Paris Saint-Germain, winning consecutive league and cup titles for two seasons. He returned to RK Zagreb for a fourth stint in 2016, before retiring after the 2017–18 season. Towards the end of the 2018–19 season, Vori came out of retirement to briefly play for RK Zagreb. In March 2022, Vori joined German club Füchse Berlin for the remainder of the 2021–22 season.

== International career ==
Vori made his debut for the Croatian national team in 2001. He won the 2003 World Championship and the Olympic gold medal in 2004 with the national team. The Croatian team placed second at the 2005 World Championship and the 2008 European Championship, with Vori voted best defensive player at the latter tournament. At the 2008 Summer Olympics, Vori and the national team placed fourth after losing to Spain in the bronze medal match.

At the 2009 World Championship held in Croatia, the Croatian team finished second, while Vori was voted most valuable player and best pivot of the tournament. He was given a red card during the last minutes of the final match after pretending to throw the ball at a referee's face. Vori and the national team placed second at the 2010 European Championship, where he was again included on the tournament's All-Star Team as best pivot.

At the 2012 European Championship, Vori placed third with the national team. He was part of the Croatian squad that won the bronze medal at the 2012 Summer Olympics. Vori and the Croatian team finished third at the 2013 World Championship. During his final years with the national team, he represented Croatia at the European Championships in 2014 and 2018, and the 2015 World Championships. Vori retired from the national team in 2018, having made 246 appearances and scored 590 goals. He captained the team from 2009 to 2015 and holds the record for most appearances for the Croatian national team.

== Coaching career ==
Following his retirement from playing in 2018, Vori joined the Croatian national team as an assistant coach to Lino Červar and won the gold medal at the Mediterranean Games with the team that same year. On 1 June 2020, following the resignation of Veselin Vujović, Vori was named the new head coach of RK Zagreb and left his role at the national team. He was sacked on 9 October that same year. In March 2022, Vori was announced as new head coach of U21 Croatia national team. In July 2022, he was appointed the new head coach of TV Großwallstadt. He departed the club in January 2023 for personal reasons, citing a wish to return to Croatia. In October 2023, Vori was announced as the new head coach of MRK Sesvete.

== Honours ==
=== Club ===
Zagreb

- Croatian Premier League: 1997–98, 1998–99, 1999–00, 2000–01, 2003–04, 2004–05, 2007–08, 2008–09, 2016–17, 2017–18
- Croatian Cup: 1998, 1999, 2000, 2004, 2005, 2008, 2009, 2017, 2018

Conversano

- Serie A: 2002–03
- Italian Cup: 2003

FC Barcelona

- Liga ASOBAL: 2005–06
- Copa del Rey: 2007
- Supercopa ASOBAL: 2006–07
- Pirenees Leagues: 2005–06, 2006–07

HSV Hamburg

- Bundesliga: 2010–11
- DHB-Pokal: 2010
- DHB-Supercup: 2009, 2010
- EHF Champions League: 2012–13

Paris Saint-Germain

- LNH Division 1: 2014–15, 2015–16
- Coupe de France: 2014, 2015
- Trophée des champions: 2014, 2015

=== Individual ===
General

- Franjo Bučar State Award for Sport: 2004

All-Star Team

- Best defensive player of the 2008 European Championship
- Most valuable player and best pivot of the 2009 World Championship
- Best pivot of the 2010 European Championship
- EHF Hall of Fame in 2024.

== Orders ==
- Order of Danica Hrvatska with face of Franjo Bučar
