= 2007–08 Croatian First League =

Dukat 1.HRL League
- Season: 2007–08
- Champions: Croatia Osiguranje Zagreb
- EHF Champions League: Zagreb
- EHF Cup: NEXE Našice
- EHF Cup Winners' Cup: Perutnina PIPO IPC Čakovec
- EHF Challenge Cup: Poreč, Karlovac
- Matches played: 30

2007–08 Croatian First League was the 18th season of the Croatian handball league since its independence and the seventh and last season of the First League format.

== League table ==
Pos.	Team	Pld.	W	D	L	Goal+	Goal-	Pts.
1.	Croatia Osiguranje Zagreb	30	29	1	0	1185	759	59
2.	Perutnina PIPO IPC Čakovec	30	20	2	8	1006	912	42
3.	NEXE Našice	30	19	3	8	1030	920	41
4.	Poreč	30	17	3	10	952	868	37
5.	Karlovac	30	15	1	14	831	805	31
6.	Siscia Sisak	30	15	1	14	899	880	31
7.	Dubrava Zagreb	30	15	1	14	983	992	31
8.	Zamet Rijeka	30	15	0	15	814	813	30
9.	Varteks Di Caprio Varaždin	30	14	1	15	803	819	29
10.	Moslavina Kutina	30	14	1	15	866	884	29
11.	Split Koteks	30	13	2	15	868	883	28
12.	Osijek	30	13	1	16	804	802	27
13.	Metković	30	12	3	15	869	921	27
14.	Medveščak NFD Zagreb	30	12	0	18	802	828	24
15.	Bjelovar	30	4	1	25	768	996	9
16.	Gorica Velika Gorica	30	2	1	27	638	1036	5

Source: SportNet.hr

== 2007-08 winning team ==
=== RK Croatia Osiguranje Zagreb ===
- GK: Vlado Šola, Dragan Jerković, Vjenceslav Somić
- LB: Tonči Valčić, Branko Bedeković, Damir Bičanić
- CB: Domagoj Duvnjak, Denis Špoljarić, Josip Valčić, Marko Tarabochia
- RB: Kiril Lazarov, Marko Kopljar, Hrvoje Tojčić
- RW: Mirza Džomba, Zlatko Horvat, Luka Raković
- LW: Nikša Kaleb, Ljubo Vukić, Manuel Štrlek
- LP: Branimir Koloper, Igor Vori
- Head coach: Nenad Kljaić

Source: eurohandball.com
