= 2008–09 Croatian Premier League (handball) =

2008–09 Premijer Liga
- League: Croatian Premier Handball League
- Sport: Handball
- Games: 30
- Teams: 16

Regular season
- Season champions: Croatia Osiguranje Zagreb

Seasons
- ← 2007–08 2009–10 →

The 2008–09 Dukat Premijer Liga season is the eighteenth since its establishment.

== Teams ==
Locations of teams participating in the 2008-09 season

| Team | City | Venue (Capacity) |
|---|---|---|
| RK Bjelovar | Bjelovar | Školsko-sportska dvorana Bjelovar (1,500) |
| RK Croatia Osiguranje | Zagreb | Kutija Šibica (1,500), Arena Zagreb (15, 000) |
| RK Dubrava | Zagreb | ŠD Dubrava (1,260) |
| HRK Karlovac | Karlovac | SŠD Mladost (2,750) |
| RK Medveščak NFD | Zagreb | Kutija Šibica (1,500) |
| RK Međimurje | Čakovec | Dvorana Građevinske škole (1,150) |
| RK Moslavina Kutina | Kutina | ŠC Kutina (1,300) |
| RK Metković | Metković | Sportska dvorana Metković (3500) |
| RK NEXE | Našice | Sportska dvorana kralja Tomislava (2,500) |
| RK Osijek | Osijek | Zrinjevac Sport Hall (1,650) |
| RK Poreč | Poreč | SRC Veli Jože (1,000) |
| RK Siscia | Sisak | SD Brezovica (1,500) |
| RK Split | Split | Arena Gripe (3,000) |
| RK Umag | Umag | SD Stella Maris (1, 725) |
| RK Varteks Di Caprio | Varaždin | Varaždin Arena (5,200) |
| RK Zamet | Rijeka | Dvorana Mladosti (3,960) |

== League table ==
| Pos. | Team | Pld. | W | D | L | Goal+ | Goal- | Pts. |
|---|---|---|---|---|---|---|---|---|
| 1. | Croatia Osiguranje Zagreb | 30 | 30 | 0 | 0 | 1171 | 708 | 60 |
| 2. | NEXE Našice | 30 | 20 | 6 | 4 | 963 | 790 | 46 |
| 3. | Metković | 30 | 20 | 3 | 7 | 907 | 869 | 43 |
| 4. | Siscia Sisak | 30 | 16 | 7 | 7 | 815 | 757 | 39 |
| 5. | Varteks Di Caprio | 30 | 16 | 1 | 13 | 862 | 882 | 33 |
| 6. | Međimurje Čakovec | 30 | 14 | 2 | 14 | 857 | 845 | 30 |
| 7. | Karlovac | 30 | 12 | 6 | 12 | 815 | 819 | 30 |
| 8. | Split | 30 | 12 | 3 | 15 | 728 | 811 | 27 |
| 9. | Poreč | 30 | 10 | 5 | 15 | 788 | 831 | 25 |
| 10. | Osijek | 30 | 11 | 3 | 16 | 766 | 846 | 25 |
| 11. | Moslavina Kutina | 30 | 11 | 2 | 17 | 804 | 895 | 24 |
| 12. | Medveščak NFD Zagreb | 30 | 10 | 3 | 17 | 726 | 810 | 23 |
| 13. | Bjelovar | 30 | 10 | 2 | 18 | 786 | 840 | 22 |
| 14. | Zamet Rijeka | 30 | 9 | 2 | 19 | 776 | 858 | 20 |
| 15. | Umag | 30 | 8 | 2 | 20 | 811 | 884 | 18 |
| 16. | Dubrava Zagreb | 30 | 7 | 1 | 22 | 871 | 1001 | 15 |

| Qualified for the 2009-10 EHF Champions League | Qualified for the 2009-10 EHF Cup | Qualified for the 2009-10 EHF Cup Winners' Cup | Qualified for the 2009-10 EHF Challenge Cup | Relegated to 2009-10 1.HRL |

== 2008-09 winning team ==
=== RK Croatia Osiguranje Zagreb ===
- GK: Marin Šego, Gorazd Škof, Vjenceslav Somić
- LB: Tonči Valčić, Ognjen Backovič
- CB: Domagoj Duvnjak, Denis Špoljarić, Josip Valčić, Ivano Balić
- RB: Kiril Lazarov, Marko Kopljar
- RW: Mirza Džomba, Zlatko Horvat
- LW: Mateo Hrvatin, Ljubo Vukić, Manuel Štrlek
- LP: Branimir Koloper, Igor Vori
- Head coach: Senjanin Maglajlija

Source: archiv.thw-handball.de

== Sources ==
- HRS
- Sport.net.hr
- Rk-zamet.hr
- Rijeka.hr
