= Valter Matošević =

Croatian handball player (born 1970)

- Matošević with Croatia in Atlanta 1996

Personal information
- Nationality: Croatian
- Born: 11 May 1970 (age 56) Rijeka, SFR Yugoslavia
- Height: 1.94 m (6 ft 4 in)

Sport
- Sport: Handball
- Position: Goalkeeper

Youth career
- Years: Team
- 1984–1987: RK Zamet

Senior clubs
- Years: Team
- 1986–1987: RK Zamet II
- 1986–1993: RK Zamet
- 1993–1996: RK Badel 1862 Zagreb
- 1996–2000: RK Zamet
- 2000–2001: RK Metković Jambo
- 2001–2002: Bologna 69
- 2002–2003: RK Zagreb
- 2003–2004: Wilhelmshavener HV
- 2004–2005: RK Zagreb
- 2005–2006: RK Poreč
- 2006–2007: HSG Wetzlar
- 2007–2008: Portland San Antonio
- 2008–2009: FCK Håndbold
- 2009–2010: RK Zamet
- 2010–2011: TuS Nettelstedt-Lübbecke
National team
Years	Team	Apps	(Gls)
1989–1991	Yugoslavia	22	(0)
1992–2004	Croatia	191	(2)

Teams managed
- 2010–2016: Croatia U-19 (GK coach)
- 2012–2017: Zamet (assistant)
- 2013–2016: Croatia U-21 (GK coach)
- 2013–2016: Croatia (GK Coach)
- 2017: Zamet (Youth academy)
- 2017-2019: Mornar-Crikvenica
- 2017-2019: Zamet (goalkerping coach)
- 2019: Zamet
Medal record
Men's handball
Representing Yugoslavia
Mediterranean Games
Gold medal – first place	1991 Athens	Team competition
Representing Croatia
Olympic Games
Gold medal – first place	1996 Atlanta	Team competition
Gold medal – first place	2004 Athens	Team competition
World Championship
Silver medal – second place	1995 Island	Team competition
Gold medal – first place	2003 Portugal	Team competition
European Championship
Bronze medal – third place	1994 Portugal	Team competition
Bronze medal – third place	2026 Denmark, Sweden, Norway	as Coach
Mediterranean Games
Gold medal – first place	1997 Bari	Team competition
Gold medal – first place	2001 Tunis	Team competition
Youth World Championship
Silver medal – second place	2013 Hungary	as Coach

Valter Matošević (born 11 June 1970) is a former Croatian team handball player who was at the goalkeeper position. He played for professional teams in Croatia, Germany, Spain, Denmark and Italy. He is current handball coach.

He was part of the national team for 12 years and won gold medals at the 1996 Summer Olympics, 2003 World Men's Handball Championship and 2004 Summer Olympics.

In 2023 he became the assistant goalkeeping coach to first Goran Perkovac and then Dagur Sigurðsson in the Croatian Handball Team and (as of 2026) he helped the team win two medals (2025, 2026).

== Career ==
Matošević started his career in his hometown club RK Zamet where he competed in Yugoslav First League and Croatian First League. At a very young age he was recognized as a goalkeeper prodigy so at the age of 16 he made his debut for Zamet II.

In 1993 he left to join Badel 1862 Zagreb later Croatia Banka the Croatian handball title holders. At Zagreb Matošević had three successes, winning the league and cup while reaching the Champions League finals in 1995.

He returned to Zamet in 1996, who had just come out of the Croatian Second League, and spent four years there helping return the club to the top of Croatian handball. During this time he captained his team. Later his career took him to Metković Jambo, Bologna 69, Wilhelmshavener HV, two more spells at Zagreb, Poreč, HSG Wetzlar, Portland San Antonio and FCK Håndbold. After playing out of Croatia for a few years Matošević returned to RK Zamet in 2009 to end his career.

In December 2010 TuS Nettelstedt-Lübbecke called up Matošević to play for half a season due to the injury of their goalkeeper Nikola Blažičko.

In 2015 he came out of retirement again to play for ThSV Eisenach so they could get promoted to the A rank bundesliga. They finished second in the league and were promoted to the 1. bundesliga.

== International career ==
Matošević made his first appearance for the Yugoslav national team in 1989. He competed for Yugoslavia at 1991 Mediterranean Games in Athens.

He played for the Croatian national team from 1992 till 2004.

Matošević was a member of the Croatian national team that won gold Olympic medals two times: at the 1996 Summer Olympics and at the 2004 Summer Olympics.

He played in the 1994 European Championship, 1995 World Championship, 1996 European Championship, 1997 World Championship, 1998 European Championship, 2000 European Championship 2001 World Championship, 2002 European Championship and 2003 World Championship, where Croatia was the world champion.

He also played in various friendly tournaments for Croatia such as the Croatia Cup, Elfag Cup, Paris tournament and Super League.

Matošević scored a goal against the United States in 2001. He also scored a goal at the 2003 World Championship Qualification Tournament against Saudi Arabia.

After the 2004 Summer Olympics he went into retirement from the national team.

== Coaching career ==
After his second retirement he started coaching the goalkeepers of Croatia U-19, RK Zamet where he is also the assistant coach and the Croatian national team. Matošević has also been a part of the RINA handball academy, coaching children in Rijeka and Kastav.

On 31 October Željko Babić, the head coach of the Croatian national team, announced that Venio Losert would be the new goalkeeper coach of the national team. Matošević responded three days later stating that Babić didn't even call him to tell him the news. He then gave the players and the team his best wishes.

== Personal life ==
In 2016 he appeared in two documentaries, Od ponora do Olimpa and Prvi Put, which follow the events of the 1996 Summer Olympics in Atlanta where Croatia won their first gold medal in handball.

== Honours ==
=== Club ===
RK Zamet

- Croatian First A League
  - Vice-champions (1): 1992
- Croatian Cup
  - Finalist (1): 2000
- Yugoslav Second League
  - Winner (1): 1986–87

RK Zagreb

- Croatian First League
  - Winner (5): 1993-94, 1994–95, 1995–96, 2002–03, 2004–05
- Croatian Handball Cup
  - Winner (5): 1994, 1995, 1996, 2003, 2005
- EHF Champions League
  - Runner-up (1): 1995
- EHF Cup Winners' Cup
  - Finalist (1): 2005

RK Metković

- Croatian First League
  - Vice-champions (1): 2000-01
- Croatian Handball Cup
  - Winner (1): 2001
- EHF Cup
  - Finalist (1): 2001

FCK Håndbold

- Danish Handball Cup
  - Winner (1): 2009

ThSV Eisenach

- 2. Bundesliga
  - Promotion (1): 2014–15

=== Individual ===
- 2nd best goalkeeper at World Championship in Iceland 1995
- Best Croatian handballer of 1995 by CHF & Sportske novosti
- Sportsperson of the year by Novi list - 1995
- Ivica Jobo Kurtini Award - 1995
- Franjo Bučar State Award for Sport - 1996 and 2004
- RK Zamet hall of fame - 2015
- Plack with names of Rijeka's Olympic medalists -2014
- RK Zamet hall of fame - 2015

=== Records ===
- Record in Croatian national team for the number of saves in one match - 24
- Rijeka's sportsperson with the most sports honours

=== Yugoslavia ===
- 1991 Mediterranean Games in Athens - 1st

=== Croatia ===
Major tournaments

- 1994 European Championship in Portugal - 3rd
- 1995 World Championship in Island - 2nd
- 1996 European Championship in Spain- 5th
- 1996 Summer Olympics in Atlanta - 1st
- 1997 World Championship in Japan - 13th
- 1998 European Championship in Italy - 8th
- 2000 European Championship in Croatia - 6th
- 2001 World Championship in France - 9th
- 2002 European Championship in Sweden - 16th
- 2003 World Championship in Portugal - 1st
- 2004 European Championship in Slovenia - 4th
- 2004 Summer Olympics in Athens - 1st

Minor tournaments

- 1996 Stratoil World Cup - 8th
- 1997 Mediterranean Games in Bari - 1st
- 1999 Pre-Olympic Tournament - 2nd
- 1999 Super Cup in Germany - 2nd
- 2001 Mediterranean Games in Tunis - 1st
- 2001 Super Cup in Germany - 4th
- 2003 World Championship Qualification Tournament in Portugal - 1st
- 2003 Super Cup in Germany - 4th

Friendly tournaments

- 1997 Paris Tournament - 1st
- 2000 Croatia Cup - 1st
- 2002 Elfag Cup - 2nd
- 2002 Getman Cup - 2nd

Croatia U-19

- 2013 Youth World Championship - 2nd

=== Coach ===
RK Mornar-Crikvenica

- Croatian Second League - West (1): 2017-18

== Orders ==
- Order of Danica Hrvatska with face of Franjo Bučar - 1995
- Order of Duke Trpimir with Neck Badge and Morning Star - 1996
- Order of Duke Branimir with Necklace - 2004
