= 2005–06 Croatian First League =

First League
- Season: 2005–06
- Champions: Zagreb
- EHF Champions League: Zagreb
- EHF Cup: Perutnina PIPO IPC
- EHF Cup Winners' Cup: Osijek Elektromodul
- EHF Challenge Cup: Medveščak Infosistem Zagreb
- Matches: 38

2005–06 Croatian First League was the 16th season of the Croatian handball league since its independence and the fifth season of the First League format.

== League table and results ==
=== Group A ===
| | Club | P | W | D | L | G+ | G− | Dif | Pts | Second Phase |
|---|---|---|---|---|---|---|---|---|---|---|
| 1. | Zagreb | 14 | 14 | 0 | 0 | 489 | 325 | +164 | 28 | Championship play-offs |
| 2. | Agram Medveščak Zagreb | 14 | 10 | 1 | 3 | 419 | 350 | +69 | 21 | Championship play-offs |
| 3. | Osijek Elektromodul | 14 | 8 | 0 | 6 | 368 | 381 | -13 | 16 | Championship play-offs |
| 4. | Varteks di Caprio Varaždin | 14 | 7 | 1 | 6 | 410 | 407 | +3 | 15 | Relegation play-offs |
| 5. | Đakovo | 14 | 7 | 0 | 7 | 377 | 410 | -33 | 14 | Relegation play-offs |
| 6. | Dubrava Zagreb | 14 | 5 | 0 | 9 | 401 | 434 | -33 | 8 (-2) | Relegation play-offs |
| 7. | Karlovac | 14 | 3 | 2 | 9 | 399 | 440 | -41 | 8 | Relegation play-offs |
| 8. | Solin Industrogradnja | 14 | 1 | 0 | 13 | 347 | 463 | -116 | 2 | Relegation play-offs |

==== Group B ====
| | Club | P | W | D | L | G+ | G− | Dif | Pts | Second Phase |
|---|---|---|---|---|---|---|---|---|---|---|
| 1. | Perutnina PIPO IPC Čakovec | 14 | 13 | 0 | 1 | 451 | 392 | +59 | 26 | Championship play-offs |
| 2. | Poreč | 14 | 9 | 1 | 4 | 419 | 397 | +22 | 19 | Championship play-offs |
| 3. | Zamet Rijeka | 14 | 8 | 2 | 4 | 405 | 383 | +22 | 18 | Championship play-offs |
| 4. | Koteks Split | 14 | 8 | 0 | 6 | 407 | 399 | +8 | 16 | Relegation play-offs |
| 5. | Metković | 14 | 5 | 0 | 9 | 416 | 428 | -22 | 10 | Relegation play-offs |
| 6. | Moslavina Kutina | 14 | 5 | 0 | 9 | 397 | 423 | -26 | 10 | Relegation play-offs |
| 7. | Crikvenica | 14 | 3 | 1 | 10 | 386 | 419 | -33 | 7 | Relegation play-offs |
| 8 | Gorica Velika Gorica | 14 | 3 | 0 | 11 | 384 | 422 | -38 | 6 | Relegation play-offs |

== Second phase ==
=== Championship play-offs ===
Intermediate results from the first part are transferred, and the clubs play two more games with teams from the same group and four with teams from the second group of the first part of the championship (16 in total, in the table of 20 matches).

| | Club | P | W | D | L | G+ | G− | Dif | Pts |
|---|---|---|---|---|---|---|---|---|---|
| 1. | Zagreb | 20 | 19 | 1 | 0 | 684 | 506 | 178 | 39 |
| 2. | Perutnina PIPO IPC Čakovec | 20 | 12 | 1 | 7 | 624 | 617 | 7 | 25 |
| 3. | Agram Medveščak Zagreb | 20 | 12 | 0 | 8 | 535 | 520 | 15 | 23 (-1) |
| 4. | Poreč | 20 | 7 | 2 | 11 | 558 | 586 | -28 | 16 |
| 5. | Osijek Elektromodul | 20 | 4 | 2 | 14 | 534 | 608 | -74 | 10 |
| 6. | Zamet Rijeka | 20 | 1 | 2 | 17 | 499 | 597 | -98 | 4 |

=== Relegation play-offs ===
Play-offs to stay in the First league or to be demoted to the Second League for teams from 7 to 16 place.

| | Club | P | W | D | L | G+ | G− | Dif | Pts |
|---|---|---|---|---|---|---|---|---|---|
| 1. | Đakovo | 18 | 12 | 3 | 3 | 533 | 485 | +48 | 31 |
| 2. | Karlovac | 18 | 12 | 2 | 4 | 497 | 437 | +60 | 29 |
| 3. | Varteks Di Caprio Varaždin | 18 | 11 | 1 | 6 | 552 | 498 | +54 | 28 |
| 4. | Moslavina Kutina | 18 | 9 | 1 | 8 | 527 | 517 | +10 | 22 |
| 5. | Dubrava Zagreb | 18 | 6 | 7 | 5 | 527 | 486 | +41 | 21 |
| 6. | Koteks Split | 18 | 7 | 2 | 9 | 486 | 516 | -30 | 21 |
| 7. | Crikvenica | 18 | 7 | 2 | 9 | 497 | 499 | -2 | 18 |
| 8. | Metković | 18 | 5 | 3 | 10 | 511 | 538 | -27 | 17 |
| 9. | Gorica Velika Gorica | 18 | 7 | 1 | 10 | 512 | 531 | -19 | 16 |
| 10. | Solin Industrogradnja | 18 | 1 | 4 | 13 | 481 | 616 | -135 | 7 |

2005-06 Croatian First League winners
(Zagreb)
Zagreb
Fifteenth title

== Final standings ==
| Gold medal | Zagreb |
| Silver medal | Perutnina PIPO IPC |
| Bronze medal | Agram Medveščak Zagreb |
| 4 | Poreč |
| 5 | Osijek Elektromodul |
| 6 | Zamet Rijeka |
| 7 | Đakovo |
| 8 | Karlovac |
| 9 | Varteks di Caprio Varaždin |
| 10 | Moslavina Kutina |
| 11 | Dubrava Zagreb |
| 12 | Koteks Split |
| 13 | Crikvenica |
| 14 | Metković |
| 15 | Gorica Velika Gorica |
| 16 | Solin Industrogradnja |

| Qualified for the 2006-07 EHF Champions League | Qualified for the 2006-07 EHF Cup Winners' Cup | Qualified for the 2006-07 EHF Challenge Cup |

== Sources ==
- Jurica Gizdić: "RK Solin - 50 godina rukometa u Solinu", Solin, 2006., str. 120-122
- RK Zamet - B grupa
- RK Zamet - liga za prvaka
- European Handball Federation
