= Boris Batinić =

Croatian handball player (born 1981)

Personal information
- Nationality: Croatian
- Born: 17 March 1981 (age 45) Karlovac, SFR Yugoslavia
- Height: 189 cm (74 in)

Sport
- Sport: Handball
- Position: Right wing
- Current club: Retired
- Number: 19

Senior clubs
- Years: Team
- 1998-2000: HRK Karlovac
- 2000-2004: RK Zamet Crotek
- 2004-2005: RK Zagreb
- 2005-2007: RK Perutnina Pipo IPC
- 2007-2014: HRK Karlovac

Boris Batinić (born 17 March 1981) is a former Croatian handball player.

For most of his career he played for his hometown club HRK Karlovac. He also played for RK Zamet Rijeka, RK Zagreb and RK Pipo IPC from Čakovec.

== Honours ==
RK Zagreb

- Croatian First League: 2004-05
- Croatian Cup: 2005
- EHF Cup Winners' Cup Final: 2005
