= 1992–93 Croatian First A League =

First A League
- Season: 1992–93
- Champions: Badel 1862 Zagreb
- EHF Champions League: Badel 1862 Zagreb, Coning Medveščak Zagreb
- EHF Cup Winners' Cup: Istraturist Umag
- EHF Cup: Sisak
- EHF City Cup: Karlovačka Pivovara
- Matches: 30

1992–93 Croatian First A League was the second season of First A League. It was the second season of Croatian handball to be played after their departure from the Yugoslav First League. The tournament was won by title holders Badel 1862 Zagreb.

== First phase ==
=== League 12 ===
	Club	P	W	D	L	G+	G−	Dif	Pts	
1.	Badel 1862 Zagreb	22	22	0	0	709	467	242	44	Championship play-offs
2.	Coning Medveščak Zagreb	22	17	1	4	639	524	115	35	Championship play-offs
3.	Istraturist Umag	22	15	2	5	529	447	82	32	Championship play-offs
4.	Sisak	22	15	1	6	511	491	20	31	Championship play-offs
5.	Zamet Rijeka	22	13	1	8	464	453	11	27	Placement play-offs
6.	Karlovačka pivovara	22	12	3	7	502	468	34	27	Placement play-offs
7.	Đakovo	22	9	1	12	465	503	-38	19	Placement play-offs
8.	Sirela Bjelovar	22	7	3	12	474	519	-45	17	Placement play-offs
9.	Moslavina Kutina	22	5	3	14	403	471	-68	13	Relegation play-offs
10.	Chipoteka Zagreb	22	3	2	17	417	476	-59	8	Relegation play-offs
11.	Elektra Osijek	22	4	0	18	453	576	-123	8	Relegation play-offs
12.	Split	22	0	3	19	416	557	-141	3	Relegation play-offs

== Second phase ==
=== Championship play-offs ===
Club1	Club2	Results
Semi-final
Sisak	Badel 1862	24:34, 24:35
Istraturist	Coning Medveščak	18:22, 19:23
Final
Coning Medveščak	Badel 1862	22:22, 28:25
Bold result - home match for Club1; Normally written score - away match for Club1

=== Placement play-offs ===
Matches played by teams ranked from 3 to 8 place in the League 12 table.

Club1	Club2	Results
Round 1
Đakovo	Karlovačka Pivovara	16:17, 16:21
Sirela	Zamet	16:21, 17:18
Round 2
Karlovačka Pivovara	Istraturist	26:22, 17:19, 16:20
Zamet	Sisak	22:20, 17:25, 17:18
Seventh place match
Sirela	Đakovo	18:26, 23:26
Fifth place match
Karlovačka Banka	Zamet	27:22, 20:23, 22:21
Third place match
Sisak	Istraturist	20:22, 23:27
Bold result - home match for Club1; Normally written score - away match for Club1

=== Relegation play-offs ===
Matches played by teams ranked from 9 to 12 place in the League 12 table.

	Club	P	W	D	L	G+	G−	Dif	Pts
1.	Moslavina Kutina	12	7	4	1	219	182	37	18
2.	Chipoteka Zgreb	12	6	2	4	220	195	25	14
3.	Elektra Osijek	12	6	2	4	221	206	15	14
4.	Split	12	0	2	10	98	175	-77	-4

The table also includes matches from the first section of the competition.

== Final standings ==
Gold medal	Badel 1862 Zagreb
Silver medal	Coning Medveščak Zagreb
Bronze medal	Istraturist Umag
4	Sisak
5	Karlovačka Pivovara
6	Zamet Rijeka
7	Đakovo
8	Sirela Bjelovar
9	Moslavina Kutina
10	Chipoteka Zagreb
11	Elektra Osijek
12	Split

Qualified for the 1993-94 EHF Champions League	Qualified for the 1993-94 EHF Cup Winners' Cup	Qualified for the 1993-94 EHF Cup	Qualified for the 1993-94 EHF City Cup

1992–93 Croatian First A League winners
(Zagreb)
Badel 1862 Zagreb
Second title

== Sources ==
- Fredi Kramer, Dražen Pinević: Hrvatski rukomet = Croatian handball, Zagreb, 2009.; page 178
- Petar Orgulić: 50 godina rukometa u Rijeci, Rijeka, 2004.; pages 222, 223 and 224
- Kruno Sabolić: Hrvatski športski almanah 1992/1993, Zagreb, 1992.
