= 1994–95 Croatian First A League =

First A League
- Season: 1994–95
- Champions: Badel 1862 Zagreb
- EHF Champions League: Badel 1862 Zagreb
- EHF Cup Winners' Cup: Karlovačka pivovara
- EHF Cup: Zadar Gortan
- EHF City Cup: Sisak
- Matches played: 46

1994–95 Croatian First A League was the fourth season of First A League. It was the fourth season of Croatian handball to be played after their departure from the Yugoslav First League.

== First phase ==
=== League 12 ===
	Club	P	W	D	L	G+	G−	Dif	Pts	
1.	Badel 1862 Zagreb	22	20	1	1	711	514	197	41	Championship play-offs
2.	Zadar Gortan	22	13	0	9	506	516	-10	26	Championship play-offs
3.	Sisak	22	12	1	9	547	538	9	25	Championship play-offs
4.	Karlovačka pivovara	22	11	2	9	509	475	34	24	Championship play-offs
5.	Varteks Tivar Varaždin	22	11	2	9	518	522	-4	24	Championship play-offs
6.	Metković	22	9	2	11	491	526	-35	20	
7.	Meteor Đakovo	22	8	3	11	457	488	-31	19	
8.	Bjelovar	22	9	1	12	525	557	-32	19	
9.	Zamet Rijeka	22	8	3	11	480	484	-4	19	Relegation play-offs
10.	Osijek 93	22	8	2	12	484	526	-42	18	Relegation play-offs
11.	Medveščak Zagreb	22	6	3	13	547	602	-55	15	Relegated
12.	Umag	22	6	2	14	507	534	-27	14	Relegated

== Second phase ==
=== Championship play-offs ===
Club1	Club2	Match1	Match2	Match3
Fourth place match
Karlovačka pivovara	Varteks Tivar	25:24*		
Semi-final
Karlovačka pivovara	Badel 1862	22:31*	27:30	
Sisak	Zadar Gortan	27:22*	20:21	22:22 (2:3 7m)
Third place match
Karlovačka pivovara	Sisak	27:23*	19:21	15:19
Final
Zadar Gortan	Badel 1862	20:22*	20:28	
* home match for Club1

=== Relegation play-offs ===
Club1	Club2	Score
Osijek 93	Solin Transportcommerce	35:22*, 24:24
Zamet Rijeka	Moslavina Kutina	22:21*, 17:25, 23:22
* home match for Club1'

== Final standings ==
Gold medal	Badel 1862 Zagreb
Silver medal	Zadar Gortan
Bronze medal	Sisak
4	Karlovačka pivovara
5	Varteks Tivar Varaždin
6	Metković
7	Meteor Đakovo
8	Bjelovar
9	Zamet Rijeka
10	Osijek 93
11	Medveščak Zagreb
12	Umag

Qualified for the 1995-96 EHF Champions League	Qualified for the 1995-96 EHF Cup Winners' Cup	Qualified for the 1995-96 EHF Cup	Qualified for the 1995-96 EHF City Cup

1994–95 Croatian First A League winners
(Zagreb)
Badel 1862 Zagreb
Fourth title

== Sources ==
- Fredi Kramer, Dražen Pinević: Hrvatski rukomet = Croatian handball, Zagreb, 2009.; page 178
- Petar Orgulić: 50 godina rukometa u Rijeci, Rijeka, 2004.; pages 238 and 239
- Kruno Sabolić: Hrvatski športski almanah 1992/1993, Zagreb, 1992.
- Jurica Gizdić: "RK Solin - 50 godina rukometa u Solinu", Solin, 2006., pages: 93, 94, 95
