= 1996–97 Croatian First A League =

First A League
- Season: 1996–97
- Champions: Badel 1862 Zagreb
- EHF Champions League: Badel 1862 Zagreb
- EHF Cup Winners' Cup: Karlovačka Banka
- EHF Cup: Brodokumer Split
- EHF City Cup: Metković Razvitak
- Matches played: 22

1996–97 Croatian First A League was the sixth season of the Croatian handball league since its independence.

== League table ==
	Club	P	W	D	L	G+	G−	Dif	Pts
1.	Badel 1862 Zagreb	22	21	0	1	661	482	189	42
2.	Brodomerkur Split	22	16	2	4	553	485	68	34
3.	Karlovačka banka	22	13	2	7	577	523	54	28
4.	Metković Razvitak	22	12	2	8	532	542	-10	26
5.	Zamet Rijeka	22	12	1	9	504	488	16	24 (-1)
6.	Cetera Đakovo	22	11	0	11	529	513	16	22
7.	Medveščak Zagreb	22	10	2	10	541	579	-38	22
8.	Moslavina Kutina	22	9	3	10	565	564	1	21
9.	Zrinski IPC Čakovec	22	7	1	14	553	596	-43	15
10.	Elektrometal Bjelovar	22	6	1	15	506	559	-53	13
11.	Zadar Gortan	22	5	0	17	488	576	-88	10
12.	Osijek 93	22	3	1	18	514	616	-112	7

1996–97 Croatian First A League winners
(Zagreb)
Badel 1862 Zagreb
Sixth title

== Sources ==
- Fredi Kramer, Dražen Pinević: Hrvatski rukomet = Croatian handball, Zagreb, 2009.; page. 178
- Kruno Sabolić: Hrvatski športski almanah 1996/1997, Zagreb, 1997.
- Petar Orgulić: 50 godina rukometa u Rijeci, Rijeka, 2004.; pages 250, 251
