= 1998–99 Croatian First A League =

First A League
- Season: 1998–99
- Champions: Badel 1862 Zagreb
- EHF Champions League: Badel 1862 Zagreb
- EHF Cup Winners' Cup: Medveščak
- EHF Cup: Metković Jambo
- EHF City Cup: Zamet Autotrans Rijeka
- Matches played: 22

1998–99 Croatian First A League was the eighth season of the Croatian handball league since its independence.

== League table ==
	Club	P	W	D	L	G+	G−	Dif	Pts
1.	Badel 1862 Zagreb	22	19	1	2	597	436	+161	39
2.	Metković Jambo	22	15	0	7	564	514	+50	30
3.	Zamet Autotrans Rijeka	22	14	1	7	538	492	+46	29
4.	Medveščak Zagreb	22	12	3	7	551	514	+37	27
5.	Cetera Đakovo	22	12	1	9	518	517	+1	25
6.	Brodokumer Split	22	12	0	10	557	530	+27	24
7.	Moslavina Kutina	22	11	0	11	559	556	+3	22
8.	Karlovac	22	9	2	11	507	519	-12	20
9.	Varteks Tivar Varaždin	22	9	1	12	530	550	-20	19
10.	PIPO IPC Čakovec	22	6	2	14	558	625	-67	14
11.	Trogir	22	6	0	16	498	573	-75	12
12.	Ekol Ivančica Ivanec	22	1	1	20	509	646	-137	3

1998–99 Croatian First A League winners
(Zagreb)
Zagreb
Eight title

== Sources ==
- Fredi Kramer, Dražen Pinević: Hrvatski rukomet = Croatian handball, Zagreb, 2009.; page. 179
- Petar Orgulić: 50 godina rukometa u Rijeci, Rijeka, 2005; pages 258, 259, 260
