= 1997–98 Croatian First A League =

First A League
- Season: 1997–98
- Champions: Badel 1862 Zagreb
- EHF Champions League: Badel 1862 Zagreb
- EHF Cup Winners' Cup: Cetera Đakovo
- EHF Cup: Brodokumer Split
- EHF City Cup: Zamet Autotrans
- Matches played: 22

1997–98 Croatian First A League was the seventh season of the Croatian handball league since its independence.

== League table ==
	Club	P	W	D	L	G+	G−	Dif	Pts
1.	Badel 1862 Zagreb	22	19	1	2	664	538	126	39
2.	Brodomerkur Split	22	15	2	5	592	517	75	32
3.	Zamet Autotrans Rijeka	22	12	4	6	505	492	13	28
4.	Medveščak Zagreb	22	12	1	9	553	560	-7	25
5.	Metković Razvitak	22	12	1	9	534	531	3	25
6.	Cetera Đakovo	22	10	3	9	527	527	0	23
7.	PIPO IPC Čakovec	22	9	3	9	597	587	10	21
8.	Moslavina Kutina	22	7	5	10	557	557	0	19
9.	Karlovačka Banka	22	9	1	12	528	546	-18	19
10.	Varteks Tivar Varaždin	22	7	1	14	541	576	-35	15
11.	Bjelovar	22	5	2	15	534	609	-75	12
12.	Solin Transportcommerce	22	2	2	18	518	609	-91	6

1997–98 Croatian First A League winners
(Zagreb)
Badel 1862 Zagreb
Seventh title
