= 2006–07 Croatian First League =

Dukat 1.HRL League
- Season: 2006–07
- Champions: Croatia Osiguranje Zagreb
- EHF Champions League: Zagreb
- EHF Cup: Osijek Elektromodul
- EHF Cup Winners' Cup: Karlovac
- EHF Challenge Cup: Perutnina Pipo IPC, Moslavina Kutina
- Matches: 50

2006–07 Croatian First League was the 17th season of the Croatian handball league since its independence and the sixth season of the First League format.

== League table and results ==
=== Group A ===
	Club	P	W	D	L	G+	G−	Dif	Pts	Second Phase
1	Zagreb	14	12	2	0	489	232	257	26	Championship play-offs
2	Osijek Elektromodul	14	9	1	4	417	364	53	19	Championship play-offs
3	Poreč	14	7	3	4	464	452	12	17	Championship play-offs
4	Koteks Split	14	4	2	8	368	395	-27	10	Relegation play-offs
5	Karlovac	14	4	2	8	357	378	-21	10	Relegation play-offs
6	Gorica Velika Gorica	14	5	0	9	392	441	-50	10	Relegation play-offs
7	Varteks Di Caprio Varaždin	14	4	2	8	386	447	-51	10	Relegation play-offs
8	Crikvenica	14	4	1	9	364	438	-74	9	Relegation play-offs

=== Group B ===
Pos.	Team	Pld.	W	D	L	Goal+	Goal-	+/-	Pts.
1	Perutnina PIPO IPC Čakovec	14	11	1	2	494	430	+64	23
2	Moslavina Kutina	14	8	1	5	443	439	+4	17
3	NEXE Našice	14	7	1	6	416	423	-7	15
4	Agram Medveščak Zagreb	14	7	0	7	473	432	+42	14
5	Dubrava Zagreb	14	6	1	7	405	425	-20	13
6	Metković	14	5	2	7	390	407	-17	12
7	Zamet Rijeka	14	4	2	8	389	383	+6	10
8	Đakovo	14	4	0	10	372	448	-76	8

Source: Rk-zamet.hr

=== Championship play-offs ===
Intermediate matches from the first phase were transferred, and with the opponent from the same group played two more games, and the other group of four matches (a total of 10 matches).

	Club	P	W	D	L	G+	G−	Dif	Pts	
1	Croatia Osiguranje Zagreb	12	10	1	1	434	346	88	21	Final
2	Osijek Elektromodul	12	6	2	4	354	357	-3	14	Final
3	Perutnina PIPO IPC Čakovec	12	4	1	7	384	397	-13	9	
4	Moslavina Kutina	12	2	0	10	357	429	-72	4	

=== Relegation play-offs ===
Play-offs to stay in the First league or to be demoted to the Second League for teams from 7 to 16 place. The clubs that played in the same groups have passed their results and played in the league of 12 matches against the other 6 clubs with which they were not in the same stage of the first stage (12 matches), giving a total of 22 matches for each club.

	Club	P	W	D	L	G+	G−	Dif	Pts
1	Poreč	22	14	2	6	713	647	66	30
2	Agram Medveščak Zagreb	22	13	0	9	694	633	61	26
3	NEXE Našice	22	11	2	9	661	667	-6	24
4	Koteks Split	22	9	4	9	590	590	0	22
5	Metković	22	10	2	10	597	600	-3	+22
6	Zamet Rijeka	22	10	1	11	569	543	26	21
7	Karlovac	22	9	3	10	539	551	-22	21
8	Varteks Di Caprio Varaždin	22	9	2	11	634	642	-8	20
9	Dubrava Zagreb	22	10	1	11	595	613	-18	20 (-1)
10	Gorica Velika Gorica	22	10	0	12	626	642	-16	20
11	Crikvenica	22	9	1	12	619	660	-41	19
12	Đakovo	22	9	0	13	597	642	-45	18

=== Final ===
Played by two first teams from Championship play-offs . The Champion becomes the first team to score 10 points. The results from the previous stages of the championship are transmitted.

team#1	team#2	1. Match	2. Match	3. Match	4. Match	5. Match	6. Match	7. Match
Croatia Osiguranje Zagreb	Osijek Elektromodul	34:27* ^{A}	26:26 ^{A}	38:39* ^{B}	36:26 ^{B}	45:25* ^{C}	42:23 ^{C}	36:28* ^{C}

* home match for Croatia Osiguranje Zagreb
^{A} - matches played during First phase (Group A)
^{B} - matches played during Championship play-offs
^{C} - matches played during Final

=== League for the 1 League ===
	Club	P	W	D	L	G+	G−	Dif	Pts	
1.	Gorica Velika Gorica	3	3	0	0	98	78	12	6	1. HRL 2007-08
2.	Siscia Sisak	3	2	0	1	84	82	2	4	1. HRL 2007-08
3.	Bjelovar	3	0	1	2	84	90	-6	1	1. HRL 2007-08
4.	Trogir	3	0	1	2	76	84	-8	1	

== Final standings ==
Gold medal	Croatia Osiguranje Zagreb
Silver medal	Osijek Elektromodul
Bronze medal	Perutnina PIPO IPC Čakove
4	Moslavina Kutina
5	Poreč
6	Agram Medveščak Zagreb
7	NEXE Našice
8	Koteks Split
9	Metković
10	Zamet Rijeka
11	Karlovac
12	Varteks Di Caprio Varaždin
13	Dubrava Zagreb
14	Gorica Velika Gorica
15	Crikvenica
16	Đakovo

Qualified for the 2007-08 EHF Champions League	Qualified for the 2007-08 EHF Cup	Qualified for the 2007-08 EHF Cup Winners' Cup	Qualified for the 2007-08 EHF Challenge Cup

2006-07 Croatian First League winners
(Zagreb)
Croatia Osiguranje Zagreb
Sixteenth title

== Sources ==
- Fredi Kramer, Dražen Pinević: Hrvatski rukomet = Croatian handball, Zagreb, 2009.
- hrt.hr, ljestvica i rezultati 1. dijela
- hrt.hr, ljestvica i rezultati Lige 16
- European Handball Federation
