= 1999–2000 Croatian First A League =

First A League
- Season: 1999–2000
- Champions: Badel 1862 Zagreb
- EHF Champions League: Badel 1862 Zagreb
- EHF Cup Winners' Cup: Zamet Autotrans Rijeka
- EHF Cup: Metković Jambo, Medveščak Osiguranje Zagreb
- Matches: 34

1999–2000 Croatian First A League was the ninth season of the Croatian handball league since its independence.

== League tables and results ==
=== First Phase ===
	Club	P	W	D	L	G+	G−	Dif	Pts	
1.	Badel 1862 Zagreb	18	16	0	2	538	430	+108	32	Championship play-offs
2.	Metković Jambo	18	14	0	4	474	410	+64	28	Championship play-offs
3.	Brodomerkur Split	18	11	1	6	428	384	+44	23	Championship play-offs
4.	Medveščak Osiguranje Zagreb	18	8	4	6	449	457	-8	20	Championship play-offs
5.	Wienerberger Cetera	18	6	3	9	427	457	-30	15	Championship play-offs
6.	Varteks Tivar Varaždin	18	6	3	9	466	498	-32	15	Championship play-offs
7.	Zamet Autotrans Rijeka	18	7	1	10	440	453	-13	15	Relegation play-offs
8.	Karlovac	18	6	2	10	455	471	-16	14	Relegation play-offs
9.	Moslavina Kutina	18	6	1	11	459	469	-10	13	Relegation play-offs
10.	PIPO IPC Čakovec	18	2	1	15	397	504	-107	5	Relegated

=== Championship play-offs ===
	Club	Table								.	Final result							
	Club	P	W	D	L	G+	G−	Dif	Pts	.	P	W	D	L	G+	G−	Dif	Pts
1.	Badel 1862 Zagreb	10	7	3	0	299	253	+46	17	.	28	23	3	2	837	683	+154	49
2.	Metković Jambo	10	7	1	2	291	232	+59	15	.	28	21	1	6	765	642	+123	43
3.	Brodomerkur Split	10	5	3	2	258	242	+16	13	.	28	16	4	8	686	626	-60	36
4.	Medveščak Osiguranje Zagreb	10	4	1	5	276	286	-10	9	.	28	12	5	11	725	743	-18	29
5.	Varteks Tivar Varaždin	10	3	0	7	248	286	-38	6	.	28	9	3	16	714	784	-70	21
6.	Wieneberger Cetera Đakovo	10	0	0	10	227	300	-73	0	.	28	6	3	19	654	757	-103	15

=== Relegation play-offs ===
	Club	P	W	D	L	G+	G−	Dif	Pts
1. (7.)	Zamet Autotrans Rijeka	6	4	1	1	196	171	+25	9
2. (8.)	Moslavina Kutina	6	4	0	2	179	175	+4	8
3. (9.)	Karlovac	6	3	0	3	197	184	+13	6
4. (10.)	Ekol Ivančica	6	0	1	5	158	200	-42	1

1999–2000 Croatian First A League winners
(Zagreb)
Zagreb
Ninth title

== Sources ==
- Fredi Kramer, Dražen Pinević: Hrvatski rukomet = Croatian handball, Zagreb, 2009.; page 179
- Petar Orgulić: 50 godina rukometa u Rijeci, Rijeka, 2005; pages 268, 269
