= 1993–94 Croatian First A League =

First A League
- Season: 1993–94
- Champions: Badel 1862 Zagreb
- EHF Champions League: Badel 1862 Zagreb
- EHF Cup Winners' Cup: Medveščak Zagreb
- EHF Cup: Istraturist Umag
- EHF City Cup: Varteks Tivar Varaždin
- Matches played: 30

1993–94 Croatian First A League was the third season of First A League. It was the third season of Croatian handball to be played after their departure from the Yugoslav First League.

== First phase ==
=== League 12 ===
	Club	P	W	D	L	G+	G−	Dif	Pts	
1.	Badel 1862 Zagreb	22	21	0	1	688	433	255	42	Championship play-offs
2.	Medveščak Zagreb	22	15	1	6	538	450	88	31	Championship play-offs
3.	Istraturist Umag	22	15	1	6	540	491	49	31	Championship play-offs
4.	Varteks Tivar Varaždin	22	12	4	6	508	495	11	16	Championship play-offs
5.	Karlovačka pivovara	22	12	0	10	472	465	7	24	Placement play-offs
6.	Bjelovar	22	9	2	11	483	494	−11	20	Placement play-offs
7.	Sisak	22	8	4	10	492	510	−18	20	Placement play-offs
8.	Zamet Rijeka	22	9	1	12	462	485	−23	19	Placement play-offs
9.	Zadar	22	8	1	13	428	458	−30	17	Relegation play-offs
10.	Đakovo Kvazar	22	6	3	13	414	432	−18	15	Relegation play-offs
11.	Jadranka Big Net Rudar Labin	22	4	1	17	392	562	−170	9	Relegation play-offs
12.	Zaprešić Borac	22	4	0	18	427	569	−142	8	Relegation play-offs

== Second phase ==
=== Championship play-offs ===
Bold result - home match for Club1
Normally written score - away match for Club1

Club1	Club2	Results		
Semi-final
Varteks Tivar	Badel 1862	24:26	25:32	
Istraturist	Medveščak	27:21	21:23	22:22 (9:6 7m)
Third place match
Varteks Tivar	Medveščak	27:26	20:19	
Final
Istraturist	Badel 1862	23:27	22:29	

=== Placement play-offs ===
Club1	Club2	Results		
Round 1
Zamet	Karlovačka Pivovara	23:20	12:15	20:24
Bjelovar	Sisak	23:25	26:32	
Seventh place match
Zamet	Bjelovar	22:37	22:25	
Fifth place match
Sisak	Karlovačka Pivovara	18:17	23:21	
Fourth place match
Sisak	Medveščak	28:26	31:32	30:29
rezultat pdebljan - domaća utakmica za klub1 rezultat normalna debljine - gostujuća utakmica za klub1

=== Relegation play-offs ===
mj.	klub	All together (with results from the first phase)							Ratio from relegation play-offs					
mj.	klub	P	W	D	L	Goals	Dif	Pts	P	W	D	L	Goals	
1.	Đakovo Kvazar	12	8	2	2	243:171	72	18	6	5	1	0	121:71	qualification for 1994−95 Croatian First A League
2.	Zadar	12	9	0	3	252:206	46	18	6	3	0	3	113:100	qualification for 1994−95 Croatian First A League
3.	Jadranka Big Net Rudar Labin	12	4	2	6	194:229	−35	10	6	3	1	2	96:98	1994−95 Croatian First B League
4.	Zaprešić Borac	12	1	0	11	116:199	−83	2	6	0	0	6	0:60	1994−95 Croatian First B League

== Final standings ==
Gold medal	Badel 1862 Zagreb
Silver medal	Istraturist Umag
Bronze medal	Varteks Tivar Varaždin
4	Sisak
5	Medveščak Zagreb
6	Karlovačka pivovara
7	Bjelovar
8	Zamet Rijeka
9	Đakovo Kvazar
10	Zadar
11	Jadranka Big Net Rudar Labin
12	Zaprešić - Borac

Qualified for the 1994−95 EHF Champions League	Qualified for the 1994−95 EHF Cup Winners' Cup	Qualified for the 1994−95 EHF Cup	Qualified for the 1994−95 EHF City Cup

1993–94 Croatian First A League winners
(Zagreb)
Badel 1862 Zagreb
Third title

== Sources ==
- Fredi Kramer, Dražen Pinević: Hrvatski rukomet = Croatian handball, Zagreb, 2009.; page 178
- Petar Orgulić: 50 godina rukometa u Rijeci, Rijeka, 2004.; pages 230 and 231
- Kruno Sabolić: Hrvatski športski almanah 1992/1993, Zagreb, 1992.
