= Sandro Meštrić =

Croatian handball player (born 1996)

Personal information
- Nationality: Croatian
- Born: 31 August 1996 (age 30) Zagreb, Croatia
- Height: 1.98 m (6 ft 6 in)

Sport
- Sport: Handball
- Position: Goalkeeper
- Current club: RK Zagreb
- Number: 16

Youth career
- Years: Team
- –: RK Kneginec
- –: MRK Vidovec
- –: RK Trnovec

Senior clubs
- Years: Team
- 2014–2021: GRK Varaždin 1930
- 2021: Pays d'Aix UC
- 2021–2023: RD Riko Ribnica
- 2023–2025: Industria Kielce
- 2025: → Rebud KPR Ostrovia Ostrów Wielkopolski
- 2025–11/2025: HC Meshkov Brest
- 11/2025–: RK Zagreb
National team
Years	Team	Apps	(Gls)
2024–	Croatia	2	(0)

Sandro Meštrić (born 31 August 1996) is a Croatian handball player for RK Zagreb.
