= 1995–96 Croatian First A League =

First A League
- Season: 1995–96
- Champions: Croatia Banka Zagreb
- EHF Champions League: Croatia Banka Zagreb
- EHF Cup Winners' Cup: Moslavina Kutina
- EHF Cup: Karlovačka pivovara
- EHF City Cup: Zadar Gortan
- Matches played: 22

1995–96 Croatian First A League was the fifth season of the Croatian handball league since its independence.

== League table ==
	Club	P	W	D	L	G+	G−	Dif	Pts
1.	Croatia Banka Zagreb	22	18	3	1	668	499	167	39
2.	Karlovačka pivovara	22	15	1	6	571	493	78	30 (-1)
3.	Moslavina Kutina	22	13	1	8	527	496	31	27
4.	Zadar Gortan	22	12	3	7	557	525	32	27
5.	Metković	22	11	2	9	513	501	12	24
6.	Osijek 93	22	10	1	11	493	525	-32	21
7.	KRM Split	22	8	4	10	532	512	20	20
8.	Meteor Đakovo	22	8	3	11	486	530	-44	19
9.	Zrinski IPC Čakovec	22	8	2	12	535	604	-69	18
10.	Bjelovar	22	7	4	11	534	594	-60	18
11.	Sisak	22	6	0	16	542	581	-39	12
12.	Varteks Tivar Varaždin	22	4	0	18	459	560	8	7 (-1)

1995–96 Croatian First A League winners
(Zagreb)
Croatia Banka Zagreb
Fifth title

== Sources ==
- Fredi Kramer, Dražen Pinević: Hrvatski rukomet = Croatian handball, Zagreb, 2009.; page. 178
- Kruno Sabolić: Hrvatski športski almanah 1996/1997, Zagreb, 1997.
