= Domagoj Duvnjak =

Croatian handball player (born 1988)

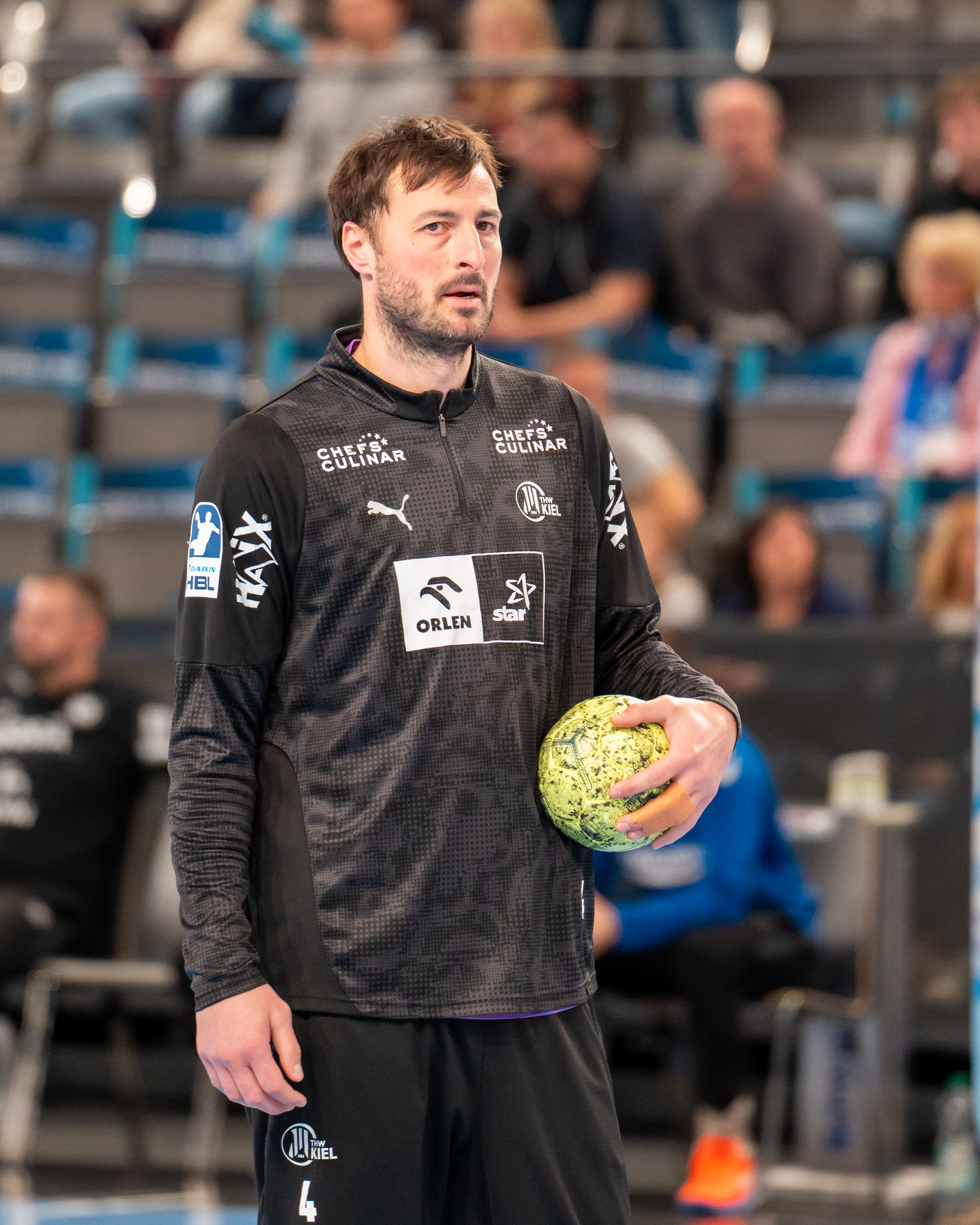
- Duvnjak with THW Kiel in 2026

Personal information
- Nationality: Croatian
- Born: 1 June 1988 (age 38) Đakovo, Croatia
- Height: 1.97 m (6 ft 6 in)

Sport
- Sport: Handball
- Position: Centre back
- Current club: THW Kiel
- Number: 4

Senior clubs
- Years: Team
- 2004–2006: RK Đakovo
- 2006–2009: RK Zagreb
- 2009–2014: HSV Hamburg
- 2014–: THW Kiel
National team
Years	Team	Apps	(Gls)
2006–2025	Croatia	257	(771)
Medal record
Olympic Games
Bronze medal – third place	2012 London	Team
World Championship
Silver medal – second place	2009 Croatia
Silver medal – second place	2025 Croatia/Denmark/Norway
Bronze medal – third place	2013 Spain
European Championship
Silver medal – second place	2008 Norway
Silver medal – second place	2010 Austria
Silver medal – second place	2020 Sweden/Austria/Norway
Bronze medal – third place	2012 Serbia
Bronze medal – third place	2016 Poland
U-19 World Championship
Silver medal – second place	2007 Bahrain
Bronze medal – third place	2005 Qatar
U-18 European Championship
Gold medal – first place	2006 Estonia

Domagoj Duvnjak (born 1 June 1988) is a Croatian professional handball player for THW Kiel. Regarded as one of the best handball players of all time, he was named the IHF World Player of the Year in 2013 and has won over twenty titles playing for clubs in Croatia and Germany. Duvnjak began his senior club career at local team RK Đakovo in 2004, before moving to fellow Croatian club RK Zagreb two years later. In August 2009, Duvnjak signed a three-year contract with German team HSV Hamburg worth €2.25 million, including a transfer fee of €1.1 million, making him the most expensive handball player in history at the time. He has played for German club THW Kiel since 2014 and is the team's captain.

Duvnjak made his debut for the Croatia national team in 2006 and competed at the Summer Olympics in 2008, 2012, 2016 and 2024, winning a bronze medal in 2012, in addition to earning three World Championship medals and five European Championship medals with the national team. He captained the national team from 2017 until his international retirement in 2025 and holds the record for most appearances and goals for Croatia with 257 caps and 771 goals.

== Club career ==
Duvnjak became a part of local club RK Đakovo's senior team in 2004. Two years later, he moved to fellow Croatian team RK Zagreb, where he won three consecutive league and national cup titles each. In August 2009, Duvnjak joined German club HSV Hamburg on a three-year contract worth €2.25 million and a transfer fee of €1.1 million, making him, at age 21, the most expensive handball player in history at the time. He won the DHB-Supercup and DHB-Pokal in his first season with the club, before winning the Bundesliga the following year. In 2013, Duvnjak helped Hamburg win the EHF Champions League, and received the Bundesliga Player of the Season and the IHF World Player of the Year award. He joined fellow German team THW Kiel in 2014, where he won the Bundesliga in his debut season with the team. He became the captain of the team in 2016. Duvnjak won the EHF Cup in 2019 and the EHF Champions League the following season with Kiel.

== International career ==
Duvnjak was part of the Croatia men's U-19 team that placed third at the 2005 World Championship and won the gold medal with the U-18 team at the European Championship in 2006. That same year, he made his debut for the senior Croatia men's national team. Duvnjak earned the silver medal with the U-19 national team at the 2007 World Championship and earned his first championship medal with the senior national team at the 2008 European Championship, where they placed second. Duvnjak and the national team placed second at the 2009 World Championship and the 2010 European Championship.

After finishing fifth at the 2011 World Championship, the Croatian national team earned three consecutive bronze medals by placing third at the 2012 European Championship, the 2012 Summer Olympics and the 2013 World Championship, while Duvnjak was included on the latter tournament's All-Star Team as best centre back. He was again voted best centre back at an international championship after Croatia finished fourth at the 2014 European Championship. Duvnjak and the national team earned a bronze medal at the 2016 European Championship and placed fourth at the 2017 World Championship, where Duvnjak was included on the All-Star Team as best centre back for a third time. At the 2020 European Championship, Croatia earned a silver medal and Duvnjak was voted the most valuable player of the tournament. After placing second at the 2025 World Championship, Duvnjak retired from the national team.

== Personal life ==
Duvnjak's father Ivan is a former handballer and was a handball coach in Đakovo. His mother Ivanka (née Sabljić), sister Iva, uncle Dragan and cousins were also handball players. During his childhood, Duvnjak was a fan of RK Zagreb and followed the Bundesliga. He attended gymnasium in his hometown Đakovo.

Duvnjak is married to his high school sweetheart Lucija and they have three children. He is Roman Catholic.

== Honours ==
=== Club ===
RK Zagreb

- Croatian League: 2006–07, 2007–08, 2008–09
- Croatian Cup: 2007, 2008, 2009

HSV Hamburg

- EHF Champions League: 2013
- Bundesliga: 2010–11
- DHB-Pokal: 2010
- DHB-Supercup: 2009, 2010

THW Kiel

- EHF Champions League: 2020
- EHF Cup: 2019
- Bundesliga: 2014–15, 2019–20, 2020–21, 2022–23
- DHB-Pokal: 2017, 2019, 2022, 2025
- DHB-Supercup: 2014, 2015, 2020, 2021, 2022, 2023

=== Individual ===
General

- Dražen Petrović Award: 2007
- Bundesliga Ideal Team: 2011
- Best Croatian handball player by SN & CHF: 2011, 2012, 2014, 2015
- Bundesliga Player of the Season: 2013
- Handball Planet World's Best Handball Player: 2013
- IHF World Player of the Year: 2013
- Croatian Sportsman of the Year: 2020

All-Star Team

- Best centre back of the 2013 World Championship
- Best centre back of the 2014 European Championship
- Best centre back of the 2017 World Championship
- Most Valuable Player (MVP) of the 2020 European Championship
