= 2000–01 Croatian First A League =

First A League
- Season: 2000–01
- Champions: Badel 1862 Zagreb
- European Champions Cup: Metković Jambo
- EHF Cup Winners' Cup: Zamet Crotex Rijeka
- EHF Cup: Moslavina Kutina, Brodokumer Split
- Matches played: 30

2000–01 Croatian First A League was the tenth season of the Croatian handball league since its independence and the last season of the First A League format. Badel 1862 Zagreb won the league after a controversial final against Metković Jambo.

== League tables and results ==
=== League table ===
	Club	P	W	D	L	G+	G−	Dif	Pts	Qualification
1.	Badel 1862 Zagreb	22	20	1	1	754	514	+240	41	Championship play-offs
2.	Metković Jambo	22	20	1	1	652	500	+152	41	Championship play-offs
3.	Brodomerkur Split	22	15	3	4	596	512	+84	33	Championship play-offs
4.	Zamet Crotek Rijeka	22	12	1	9	561	542	+19	25	Championship play-offs
5.	Moslavina Kutina	22	10	3	9	565	584	-19	23	
6.	Đakovo	22	8	2	12	518	515	+3	18	
7.	Varteks di Caprio Varaždin	22	6	4	12	529	589	-60	16	
8.	PIPO IPC Čakovec	22	7	2	13	518	592	-74	16	
9.	Medveščak Osiguranje Zagreb	22	6	3	13	521	557	-36	15	
10.	Ekol Ivančica Ivanec	22	7	1	14	545	611	-66	15	
11.	Rudar Labin	22	6	1	15	485	591	-106	12 (-1)	
12.	Karlovac	22	4	0	18	511	612	-101	8	

=== Championship play-offs ===
The semi-final winner was decided to the club who won two matches, but the final was decided to the club that won three matches.

Phase	Club1	Club2	First match	Second match	Third match	Fourth match	Fifth match	Ratio
Semi-final	Brodomerkur Split	Metković Jambo	21:25*	21:30				2:0
Semi-final	Zamet Crotek Rijeka	Badel 1862 Zagreb	25:31*	28:32				2:0
Final	Badel 1862 Zagreb	Metković Jambo	28:23*	18:23	23:27	26:21	22:21* ^{1} (10:0)* ^{2}	3:2
*Result of home team is of Club1^{1} Match was interrupted^{2} Awarded win to Badel 1862 Zagreb

2000–01 Croatian First A League winners
(Zagreb)
Zagreb
Tenth title

== Sources ==
- Fredi Kramer, Dražen Pinević: Hrvatski rukomet = Croatian handball, Zagreb, 2009.; page 179
- Petar Orgulić: 50 godina rukometa u Rijeci, Rijeka, 2005; pages 272, 273
