= Lujo Györy =

Croatian player, referee and official (1930-2012)

Personal information
- Full name: Lujo Györy
- Nationality: Croat
- Born: 28 May 1930 Zagreb, Kingdom of Yugoslavia, (now Croatia)
- Died: 28 March 2012 (aged 81) Zagreb, Croatia

Sport
- Sport: Handball
- Position: Goalkeeper

Senior clubs
- Years: Team
- 1956–1960: (Croatia) RK Mladost Zagreb
- 1960–1967: (Croatia) GRK Zagreb
National team
- Years: Team
- 1964-1965: (Socialist Federal Republic of Yugoslavia) Yugoslavia

Lujo Györy (28 May 1930 – 28 March 2012) was a Croatian handball player, referee and official.

Györy was born in Zagreb on May 28, 1930. He was engaged in sport from an early age, first swimming, then water polo and football. With the persecution of Jews in the Independent State of Croatia his father was taken away in an unknown direction, never to be heard of again. During that time Györy was educated at the Franciscans grammar school in Varaždin. Toward the end of the World War II, after high school graduation, he returned to Zagreb. In 1948 he moved to Poreč where he founded the NK Jadran Poreč for which he played. In addition to football, Györy and several of his friends founded the swimming club of the same name. After military service in the Yugoslav People's Army Györy returned to Zagreb where he attended and graduated from the Higher Pedagogical Academy at the University of Zagreb. At that time he played handball. In 1956 he won the Yugoslavian Cup with RK Mladost Zagreb, and in 1957 Yugoslav Handball Championship second place. In 1960 Györy moved to GRK Zagreb with whom he won the Yugoslav Handball Championship in 1962, 1963 and 1965. From 1961 to 1965 he played for the Yugoslavia national handball team with 15 appearances. He also played on the 1964 World Men's Handball Championship in Czechoslovakia. Györy retired from active playing in 1967 only to become referee. He judged in the Yugoslav Handball Championship from 1970 to 1980 in 1260 handball matches. After he served as the league federal controller since 1981 to 1990. With Croatia independence, from 1991 to 1998, he worked as a supervisor and delegate in the Croatian Premier Handball League. He was later named handball instructor-supervisor.

In 2009 Croatian Olympic Committee awarded Györy with the Matija Ljubek award. Györy donated €100,000 to Zagreb oncology foundation and over 30 paintings drawn by his late wife Mira Györy. He was a member of the Jewish community of Zagreb. Györy died on March 28, 2012, in Zagreb and was buried at the Mirogoj Cemetery.

== Honours ==
Mladost Zagreb

- Yugoslav Cup (1): 1956
- Croatian Championship (2): 1956, 1961

Zagreb

- Yugoslav First League (3): 1961–62, 1962–1963, 1964–65
- Yugoslav Cup (1): 1962
