= Vlado Šola =

Croatian handball player (born 1968)

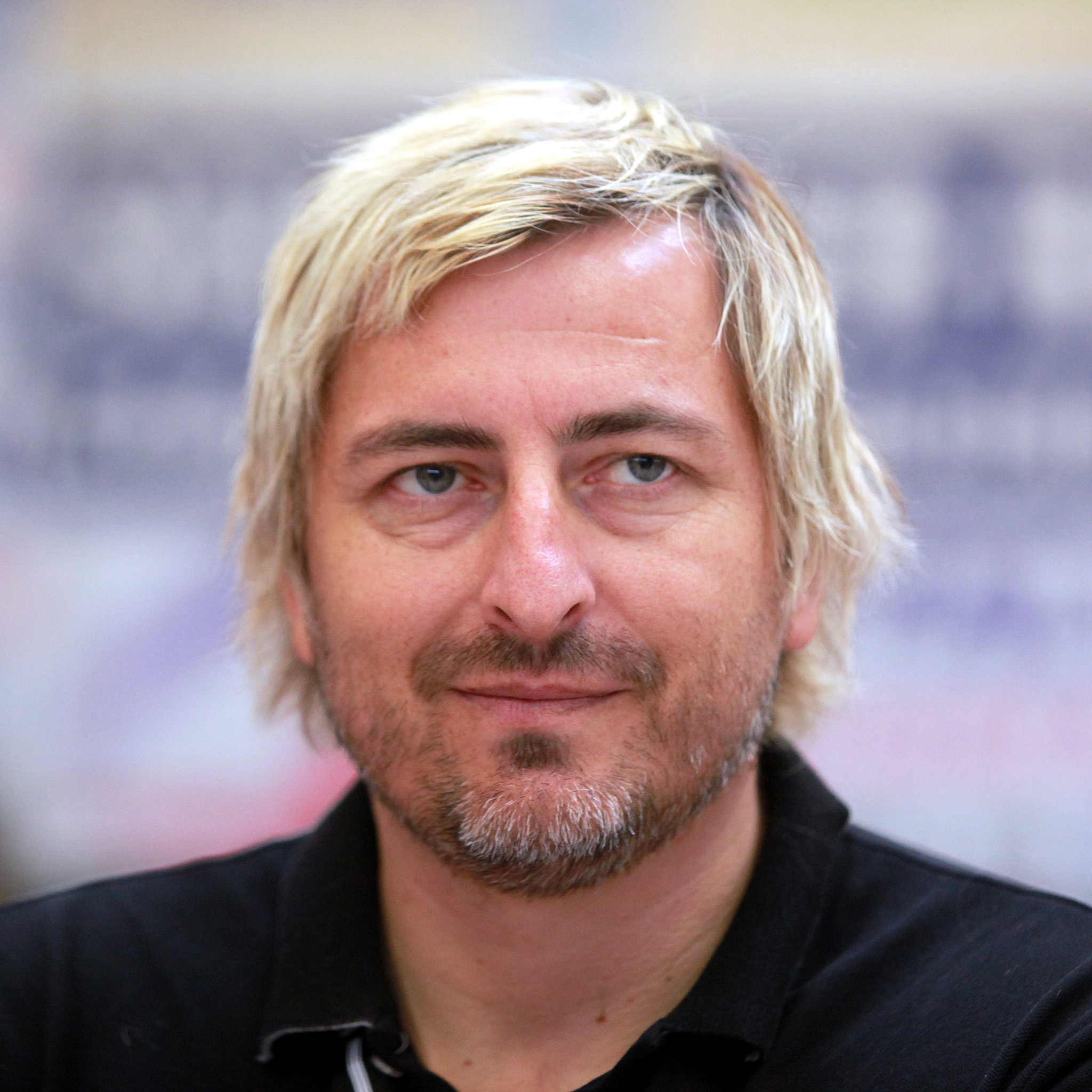

Personal information
- Full name: Vladimir Šola
- Nationality: Croatian
- Born: 16 November 1968 (age 57) Tomislavgrad, SFR Yugoslavia
- Height: 1.94 m (6 ft 4 in)

Sport
- Sport: Handball
- Position: Goalkeeper
- Current club: RK Dubrava

Senior clubs
- Years: Team
- 1984–1985: Sesvetski Kraljevac
- 1985–1995: RK Medveščak
- 1995–1996: RK Sisak
- 1996–1998: GWD Minden
- 1998–2002: SG Willstätt / Schutterwald
- 2002–2004: Chambéry
- 2004–2006: MKB Veszprém
- 2006–2008: RK Zagreb
National team
| Years | Team | Apps | (Gls) |
| 1991–2006 | Croatia | 132 | (0) |

Teams managed
- 2011–2013: Zvezda Zvenigorod
- 2011–2012, 2017–2018: Croatia (GK coach)
- 2013–2017: Al Duhail
- 2017–2019: RK Dubrava
- 2019–2020: Beijing Sport University
- 2020–2021: RK Zagreb
- 2022–2023: MRK Dugo Selo
- 2023–2024: Montenegro
- 2024–: RK Dubrava
Medal record
Men's handball
Representing Croatia
Olympic Games
| Gold medal – first place | 2004 Athens | Team |
| Bronze medal – third place | 2012 London | Goalkeeping coach |
World Championship
| Silver medal – second place | 1995 Iceland | Team |
| Gold medal – first place | 2003 Portugal | Team |
| Silver medal – second place | 2005 Tunisia | Team |
European Championship
| Bronze medal – third place | 1994 Portugal | Team |
| Bronze medal – third place | 2012 Serbia | Goalkeeping coach |
Mediterranean Games
| Gold medal – first place | 1993 Languedoc-Roussillon | Team |

Vladimir "Vlado" Šola (born 16 November 1968) is a Croatian handball coach and former player.

Born in Prisoje, Šola played the position of goalkeeper on the Croatian national team and competed in the 2004 Summer Olympics. Widely known for his energetic attitude and famously dyed red hair, he retired from playing professional handball in 2008.

== Honours ==
=== Club ===
Medveščak

- Yugoslav Cup: 1986, 1987, 1989, 1990
- Limburgse Handbal Dagen: 1993

Veszprem

- Hungarian First League: 2004–05, 2005–06
- Hungarian Cup: 2005

RK Zagreb

- Croatian Premier League: 2006–07, 2007–08
- Croatian Cup: 2007, 2008

=== Individual ===
- Franjo Bučar State Award for Sport - 2004

== Orders ==
- Order of Danica Hrvatska with face of Franjo Bučar – 1995
- Order of Duke Trpimir with Neck Badge and Morning Star – 2004
