= 2016–17 Croatian Premier League (men's handball) =

Premijer liga
- Season: 2016–17
- Champions: Zagreb
- Relegated: RK Rudar; Ribola Kaštela
- Champions League: Zagreb
- EHF Cup: Nexe

The 2016–17 Croatian Premier Handball League is the 26th season of the Premier League, Croatia's premier Handball league.

== Team information ==
Locations of the 2016–17 Croatian Premijer Liga

The following 12 clubs compete in the Premijer liga during the 2016–17 season:

Team	Location	Arena	Capacity
Dubrava	Zagreb	ŠD Dubrava	1,800
Gorica	Velika Gorica	Dvorana srednjih škola	
Ribola Kaštela	Kaštel Gomilica	Gradska dvorana Kaštela	
Metalac	Zagreb	Kutija šibica	
Nexe	Našice	Sportska dvorana kralja Tomislava	2,500
Poreč	Poreč	Sportski Rekreativni Centar Veli Jože	1,400
Rudar	Samobor	Osnovna škola Rude	
Spačva Vinkovci	Vinkovci	Sportska dvorana Bartol Kašić	
Umag	Umag		
Varaždin 1930	Varaždin	Varaždin Arena	5,200
Zagreb	Zagreb	Arena Zagreb	15,200
Zamet	Rijeka	Centar Zamet	2,350

Team from SEHA League

== Regular season ==
=== Standings ===
Pos	Team	Pld	W	D	L	GF	GA	GD	Pts	Qualification
1	Dubrava	18	10	3	5	579	545	+34	23	Championship Round
2	Umag	18	11	1	6	518	478	+40	23	Championship Round
3	Spačva Vinkovci	18	11	0	7	561	525	+36	22	Championship Round
4	Gorica	18	9	4	5	514	495	+19	22	Championship Round
5	Poreč	18	9	3	6	500	490	+10	21	Relegation Round
6	Zamet	18	8	3	7	543	539	+4	19	Relegation Round
7	Varaždin 1930	18	5	5	8	520	515	+5	15	Relegation Round
8	Rudar	18	7	1	10	479	531	−52	15	Relegation Round
9	Metalac	18	5	1	12	510	554	−44	11	Relegation Round
10	Ribola Kaštela	18	4	1	13	473	525	−52	9	Relegation Round

Source: Croatia Handball Federation

=== Results ===
Home \ Away	DUB	GOR	KAS	MET	POR	RUD	SPA	UMA	VAR	ZAM
Dubrava		28–36	31–29	34–24	29–29	41–31	33–30	27–22	35–29	43–30
Gorica	28–28		32–19	31–27	33–28	29–23	33–28	23–23	26–26	30–30
Ribola Kaštela	22–30	26–24		29–31	25–24	36–33	30–31	27–30	28–29	30–22
Metalac	41–33	25–28	32–26		21–24	25–26	27–33	27–29	35–35	31–28
Poreč	29–26	30–31	27–18	33–31		32–26	28–26	26–17	30–30	30–27
Rudar	29–27	25–24	27–24	36–23	26–26		32–29	24–34	25–24	25–28
Spačva Vinkovci	39–32	32–24	33–29	32–24	28–25	30–27		34–30	35–28	37–30
Umag	34–37	31–22	30–23	31–28	32–23	35–19	31–27		26–19	36–27
Varaždin 1930	32–34	31–32	24–24	35–25	26–29	29–21	34–30	34–23		26–28
Zamet	31–31	35–28	35–28	31–33	38–27	35–24	28–27	31–24	29–29	

Legend: Blue = home team win; Yellow = draw; Red = away team win.

== Championship Round ==
=== Standings ===
Pos	Team	Pld	W	D	L	GF	GA	GD	Pts
1	Zagreb	10	10	0	0	327	236	+91	20
2	Nexe	10	7	0	3	305	270	+35	14
3	Dubrava	10	5	1	4	327	326	+1	11
4	Gorica	10	5	0	5	291	307	−16	10
5	Spačva Vinkovci	10	2	0	8	258	321	−63	4
6	Umag	10	0	1	9	253	301	−48	1

Source: Croatian Handball Federation

== Relegation Round ==
All teams keep their points from the regular season.

=== Standings ===
Pos	Team	Pld	W	D	L	GF	GA	GD	Pts	Qualification
1	Poreč	28	14	3	11	785	788	−3	31	
2	Varaždin 1930	28	12	5	11	816	794	+22	29	
3	Zamet	28	12	4	12	836	824	+12	28	
4	Metalac	28	12	1	15	820	837	−17	25	
5	Rudar	28	10	1	17	736	810	−74	21	Relegation
6	Ribola Kaštela	28	7	2	19	748	817	−69	16	Relegation

Source: Croatian Handball Federation
