= 2004–05 Croatian First League =

First League
- Season: 2004–05
- Champions: Zagreb
- EHF Champions League: Zagreb
- EHF Cup: Perutnina PIPO IPC
- EHF Cup Winners' Cup: Osijek Elektromodul
- EHF Challenge Cup: Medveščak Infosistem Zagreb
- Matches: 38

2004–05 Croatian First League was the 14th season of the Croatian handball league since its independence and the fourth season of the First League format.

== League table ==
=== First phase ===
In the first part of the season, 16 teams played single-circuit league (15 matches). After 15 rounds the first six teams qualified for the Championship play-offs - playing for the Championship title and the remaining 10 in the Relegation play-offs - playing to stay in the league.

	Club	P	W	D	L	G+	G−	Dif	Pts	
1.	Zagreb	15	14	1	0	479	349	+130	29	Championship play-offs
2.	Metković	15	9	3	3	449	396	+53	21	Championship play-offs
3.	Medveščak Infosistem Zagreb	15	9	2	4	428	419	+9	20	Championship play-offs
4.	Osijek Elektromodul	15	8	2	5	450	427	+23	18	Championship play-offs
5.	Moslavina Kutina	15	8	2	5	450	453	-3	18	Championship play-offs
6.	Perutnina PIPO IPC Čakovec	15	8	1	6	472	431	+41	17	Championship play-offs
7.	Zamet Rijeka	15	8	1	6	446	416	+30	17	Relegation play-offs
8.	Gorica Velika Gorica	15	7	1	7	440	434	+6	15	Relegation play-offs
9.	Split	15	6	1	8	459	468	-9	13	Relegation play-offs
10.	Ekol Ivančica Ivanec	15	6	1	8	429	468	-39	13	Relegation play-offs
11.	Crikvenica	15	6	1	8	414	457	-33	13	Relegation play-offs
12.	Karlovac	15	5	2	8	401	417	-16	12	Relegation play-offs
13.	Varteks di Caprio Varaždin	15	6	0	9	390	414	-24	12	Relegation play-offs
14.	Đakovo	15	5	1	9	410	434	-24	11	Relegation play-offs
15.	Dubrava Zagreb	15	3	1	11	441	484	-43	7	Relegation play-offs
16.	Zadar Eva	15	2	0	13	386	462	-76	4	Relegation play-offs

=== Championship play-offs ===
Intermediate matches from the first part of the championship were transferred, and the clubs played three more times (15 matches).

	Club	P	W	D	L	G+	G−	Dif	Pts
1.	Zagreb	20	17	3	0	639	506	+139	37
2.	Metković	20	11	2	7	568	532	+36	24
3.	Perutnina PIPO IPC Čakovec	20	9	3	8	596	584	+12	21
4.	Osijek Elektromodul	20	10	1	9	592	585	+7	21
5.	Medveščak Infosistem Zagreb	20	4	1	15	540	624	-84	9
6.	Moslavina Kutina	20	3	2	15	525	634	-109	8

=== Relegation play-offs ===
Relegation play-offs determined the placement of clubs that were between 7th and 16th place in the first phase of the championship. 18 matches were played (double league system).

	Club	P	W	D	L	G+	G−	Dif	Pts
1.	Split	18	11	0	7	639	506	+129	25
2.	Đakovo	18	10	1	7	558	543	+15	22
3.	Karlovac	18	10	0	8	525	516	+9	22
4.	Crikvenica	18	9	1	8	503	501	+2	21
5.	Gorica Velika Gorica	18	6	5	7	564	553	+11	21
6.	Dubrava Zagreb	18	9	2	7	531	533	-2	20
7.	Varteks di Caprio Varaždin	18	8	2	8	549	541	+8	19
8.	Zamet Rijeka	18	7	1	10	540	530	+10	19
9.	Zadar Eva	18	9	1	8	512	526	-14	19
10.	Ekol Ivančica Ivanec	18	4	1	13	548	603	-55	12

2004-05 Croatian First League winners
(Zagreb)
Zagreb
Fourteenth title

== Final standings ==
Gold medal	Zagreb
Silver medal	Metković
Bronze medal	Perutnina PIPO IPC
4	Osijek Elektromodul
5	Medveščak Infosistem Zagreb
6	Moslavina Kutina
7	Split
8	Đakovo
9	Karlovac
10	Crikvenica
11	Gorica Velika Gorica
12	Dubrava Zagreb
13	Varteks di Caprio Varaždin
14	Zamet Rijeka
15	Zadar Eva
16	Ekol Ivančica Ivanec

Qualified for the 2005-06 EHF Champions League	Qualified for the 2005-06 EHF Cup Winners' Cup	Qualified for the 2005-06 EHF Cup	Qualified for the 2005-06 EHF Challenge Cup

== Sources ==
- Fredi Kramer, Dražen Pinević: Hrvatski rukomet = Croatian handball, Zagreb, 2009.; page 180
- hrt.hr, ljestvica i rezultati 1. dijela
- hrt.hr, ljestvica i rezultati Lige 16
- European Handball Federation
