= Nenad Kljaić =

Croatian handball player (born 1966)

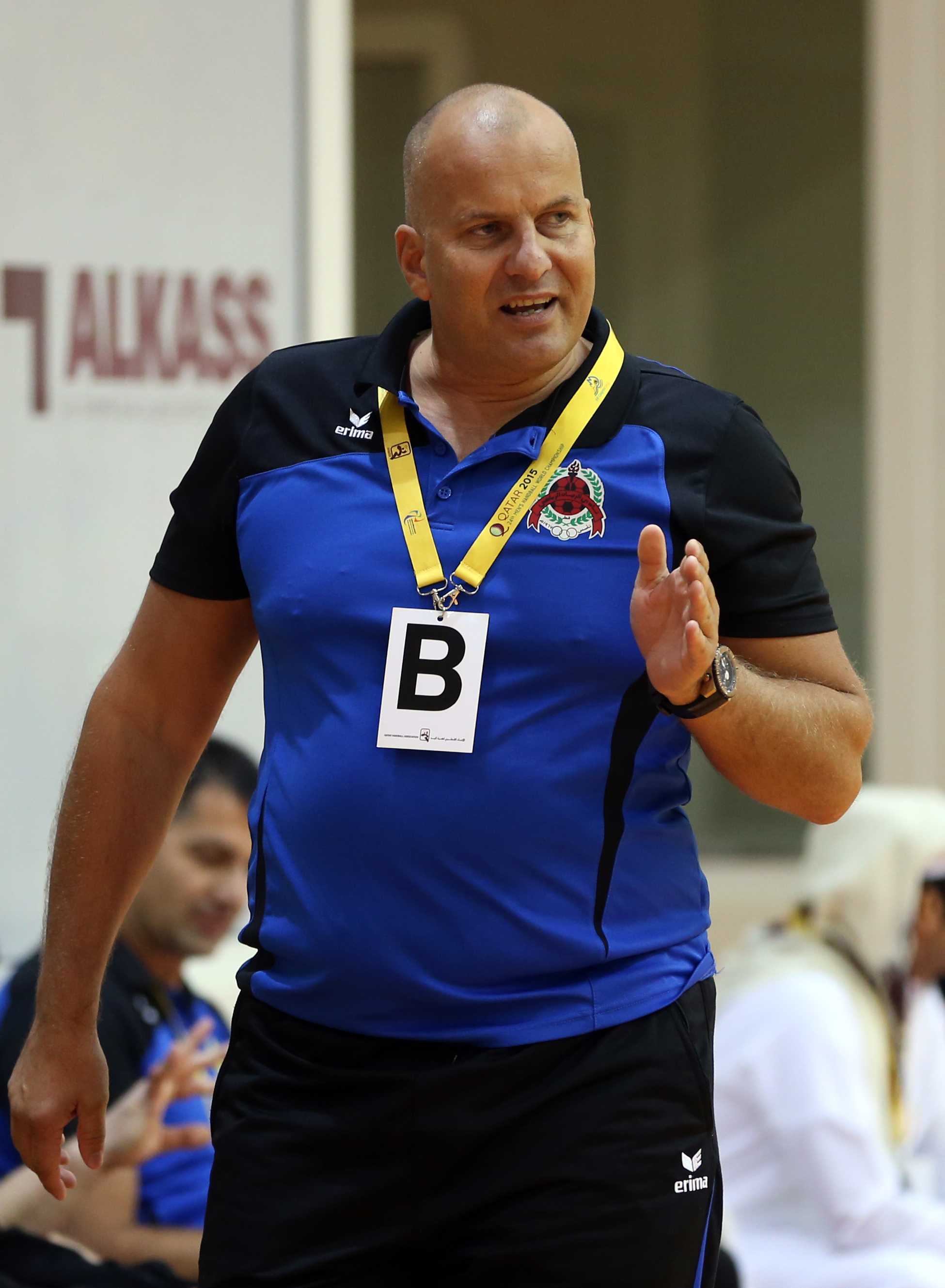
- Kljaić in 2014

Personal information
- Full name: Nenad Kljaić
- Nationality: Croatian
- Born: 21 December 1966 (age 59) Zagreb, SR Croatia, SFR Yugoslavia
- Height: 1.95 m (6 ft 5 in)

Sport
- Sport: Handball
- Position: Pivot
- Current club: Serbia (manager)

Youth career
- Years: Team
- 1980–1984: RK Medveščak Zagreb

Senior clubs
- Years: Team
- 1984–1988: RK Medveščak Zagreb
- 1988–1994: Badel 1862 Zagreb
- 1994–2000: TV Grosswallstadt
- 2000–2001: Badel 1862 Zagreb
- 2001–2002: RK Metković Jambo
- 2002–2003: RK Medveščak Zagreb
- 2003: TV Kirchzell
National team
Years	Team	Apps
1987–1990	Yugoslavia	69
1991–2001	Croatia	145

Teams managed
- 1995-1996: TV Grosswallstadt
- 2004–2005: Croatia (assistant)
- 2006–2007: RK CO Zagreb
- 2010–2011: RK CO Zagreb
- 2012–2013: Saudi Arabia
- 2013–2014: Al-Rayan SC
- 2015–2019: Saudi Arabia
- 2019–2020: Olympiacos S.F. Piraeus
Medal record
Men's handball
Representing Yugoslavia
Goodwill Games
Silver medal – second place	1990 Seattle
Representing Croatia
Olympic Games
Gold medal – first place	1996 Atlanta	Team
European Championship
Bronze medal – third place	1994 Portugal
Mediterranean Games
Gold medal – first place	1993 Languedoc-Roussillon

Nenad Kljaić (born 21 December 1966) is a Croatian former handball player and coach.

== Career ==
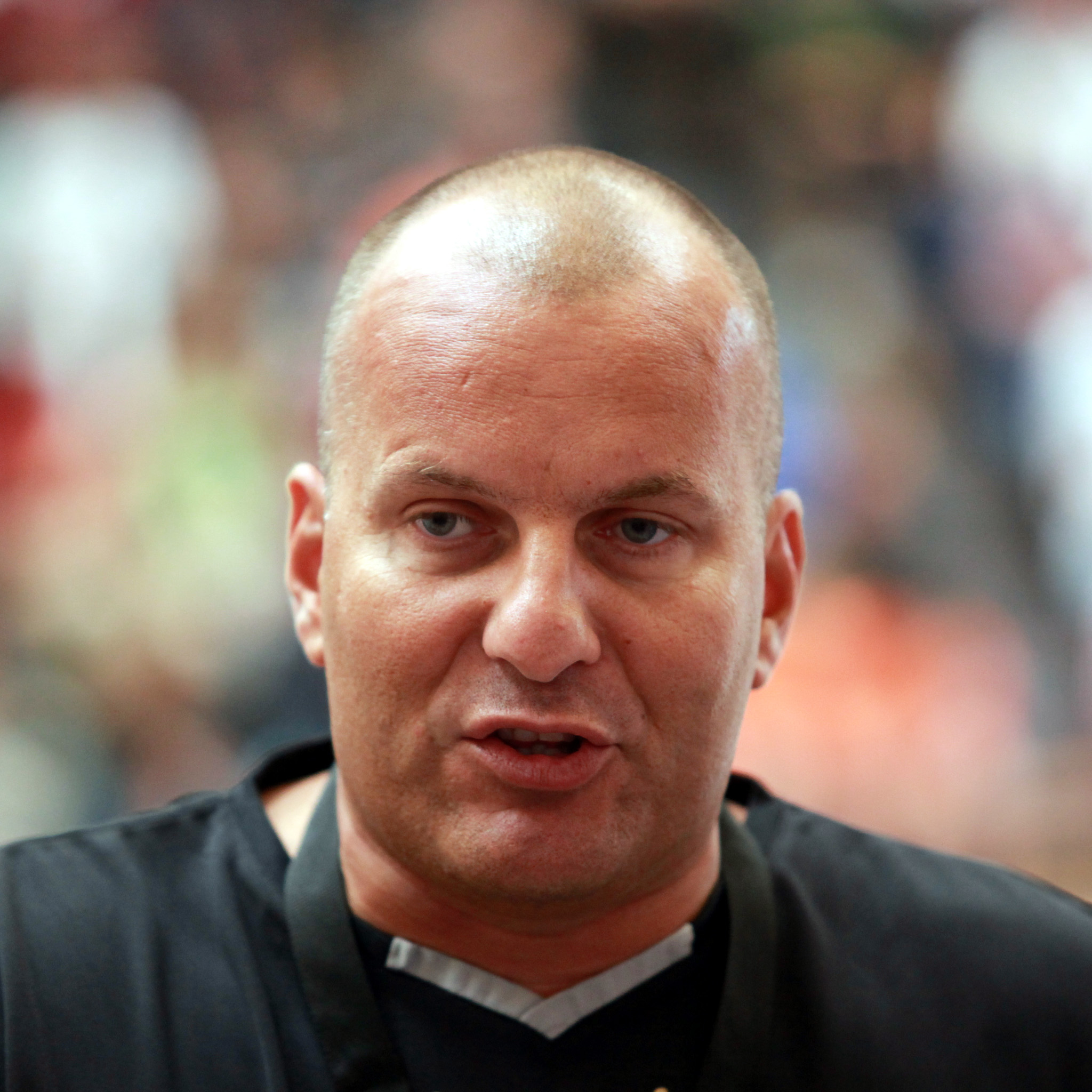
Kljaić in 2010

Kljaić won two European Champions Cups as a player with RK Zagreb in 1992 and 1993. He also won the EHF Challenge Cup in 2000 with TV Grosswallstadt.

Kljaić played for the Croatian national team from 1991 to 2001. He was part of the Croatian team that won gold medal at the 1996 Summer Olympics in Atlanta. He played six games and scored five goals.

After retiring from competitions he worked with RK Croatia Osiguranje Zagreb.

He has also been the head coach of the Saudi Arabian national team, where he led them at the 2017 World Men's Handball Championship.

== Personal life ==
He is the son of Velimir Kljaić and Jasenka Kljaić, born Neralić. He was married to Sandra Mejovšek-Kljaić. Together they have a son and daughter.

Kljaić speaks Croatian, English and German.

== Honours ==
=== Player ===
Medveščak Zagreb

- Yugoslav Cup: 1986, 1987

RK Zagreb

- Croatian First League: 1991–92, 1992–93, 1993–94, 2000–01
- Croatian Cup: 1992, 1993, 1994
- Yugoslav First League: 1988–89, 1990–91
- Yugoslav Cup: 1991
- European Champions Cup: 1992, 1993
- EHF Super Cup: 1993

TV Grosswallstadt

- EHF Challenge Cup: 2000

RK Metković Jambo

- Croatian Cup: 2002

Yugoslavia

- 1990 World Championship Czechoslovakia - 4th place
- 1990 Goodwill Games Seattle - 2nd place

Croatia

- 1993 Mediterranean Games Languedoc-Roussillon - 1st place
- 1994 European Championship Portugal - 3rd place
- 1996 Summer Olympics Atlanta - 1st place
- 1997 World Championship Japan - 13th place
- 1999 World Championship Egypt - 10th place
- 1999 Super Cup Germany - 2nd place
- 2000 European Championship Croatia - 6th place
- 2001 World Championship France - 9th place

Individual

- Franjo Bučar State Award for Sport - 1992, 1994

=== As coach ===
Croatia Osiguranje Zagreb

- Croatian First/Premier League: 2006--07, 2010-11
- Croatian Cup: 2007, 2011

Saudi Arabia

- 2013 World Championship Spain - 19th place
- 2014 Asian Championship Bahrain - 6th place
- 2015 World Championship Qatar - 22nd place
- 2016 Asian Championship Bahrain - 4th place

Al-Rayan SC

- AHF Champions League Finalist: 2013

== Orders ==
- Order of Danica Hrvatska with face of Franjo Bučar – 1995
