= RK Zagreb =

Croatian handball club

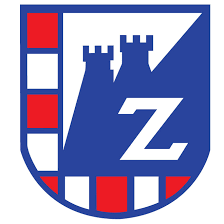
- Full name: Rukometni klub Zagreb
- Founded: 1922; 104 years ago
- Arena: Arena Zagreb (Capacity: 15,200)
- President: Mladen Vedriš
- League: Croatian Premier League
- 2024–25: Croatian Premier League, 1st of 16 (champions)
- Club colours
| Home | Away |

Rukometni klub Zagreb (English: Zagreb Handball Club pronounced [zǎːɡrɛb]), a men's professional handball club based in Zagreb, Croatia, competes in the Croatian Premier League and mainly in the EHF Champions League.

RK Zagreb has won 39 national championships and the national cup 34 times. In the European Champions League the club has won twice and played another four times in the finals; it ranks among top eight most-successful handball clubs in the League's history.

== Accomplishments ==
Croatia

- Croatian Premier Handball League

Champions (33): 1992, 1992–93, 1993–94, 1994–95, 1995–96, 1996–97, 1997–98, 1998–99, 1999–2000, 2000–01, 2001–02, 2002–03, 2003–04, 2004–05, 2005–06, 2006–07, 2007–08, 2008–09, 2009–10, 2010–11, 2011–12, 2012–13, 2013–14, 2014–15, 2015–16, 2016–17, 2017–18, 2018–19, 2020–21, 2021–22, 2022–23, 2023–24, 2024–25

- Croatian Handball Cup

Champions (32): 1991–92, 1992–93, 1993–94, 1994–95, 1995–96, 1996–97, 1997–98, 1998–99, 1999–2000, 2002–03, 2003–04, 2004–05, 2005–06, 2006–07, 2007–08, 2008–09, 2009–10, 2010–11, 2011–12, 2012–13, 2013–14, 2014–15, 2015–16, 2016–17, 2017–18, 2018–19, 2020–21, 2021–22, 2022–23, 2023–24, 2024–25, 2025–26

Yugoslavia

- Yugoslav Handball Championship

Champions (6): 1956–57, 1961–62, 1962–63, 1964–65, 1988–89, 1990–91

- Yugoslav Handball Cup

Champions (2): 1962, 1991

Europe

- EHF Champions League

Champions (2): 1991–92, 1992–93

- SEHA League

Champions (1): 2012–13

=== Individual Club Awards ===
- Double

Winners (33): 1961–62, 1990–91, 1991–92, 1992–93, 1993–94, 1994–95, 1995–96, 1996–97, 1997–98, 1998–99, 1999–00, 2002–03, 2003–04, 2004–05, 2005–06, 2006–07, 2007–08, 2008–09, 2009–10, 2010–11, 2011–12, 2012–13, 2013–14, 2014–15, 2015–16, 2016–17, 2017–18, 2018–19, 2020–21, 2021–22, 2022–23, 2023–24, 2024–25

- Triple Crown

Winners (2): 1991–92, 1992–93

== Kits ==
HOME
| 2018–22 | 2022– |

AWAY
| 2015–16 | 2018–22 | 2022– |

THIRD
| 2018–19 | 2021–22 |

== Current squad ==
Squad for the 2026–27 season

Goalkeepers

- 16 (Croatia) Sandro Meštrić
- 26 (Montenegro) Haris Suljević
- 76 (Croatia) Toni Matošević
- 99 (Slovenia) Urh Kastelic

Left wingers

- 17 (Croatia) Manuel Štrlek
- 78 (Belarus) Stanislav Sadouski

Right wingers

- 19 (Serbia) Mateja Dodić
- 71 (Croatia) Filip Glavaš (c)
- 81 (Serbia) Aleksa Tufegdžić

Line players

- 4 (Belarus) Matvei Barbashinski
- 20 (Hungary) Petar Topic
- 22 (Croatia) Zlatko Raužan
- 30 (Russia) Gleb Kalarash

Left backs

- 8 (Croatia) Diano Ćeško
- 14 (Croatia) Marko Mamić
- 31 (Egypt) Abdelrahman Abdou

Central backs

- 18 (Croatia) Igor Karačić
- 21 (Croatia) Davor Gavrić
- 23 (Croatia) Ivano Pavlović
- 44 (Belarus) Ihar Belyavski

Right backs

- 11 (Georgia (country)) Giorgi Tskhovrebadze
- 33 (Serbia) Jovica Nikolić

=== Transfers ===
Transfers for the 2026–27 season

Joining

- (Slovenia) Urh Kastelic (GK) from (Germany) TBV Lemgo
- (Russia) Gleb Kalarash (LP) from (Hungary) OTP Bank – Pick Szeged
- (Serbia) Jovica Nikolić (RB) from (Hungary) OTP Bank – Pick Szeged
- (Belarus) Matvei Barbashinski (LP) from (Belarus) SKA Minsk
- (Croatia) Manuel Štrlek (LW) from (Croatia) RK Nexe Našice
- (Croatia) Marko Mamić (LB) from (Germany) SC DHfK Leipzig
- (Croatia) Diano Ćeško (LB) from (Bosnia and Herzegovina) RK Izviđač
- (Croatia) Zlatko Raužan (LP) from (Croatia) MRK Sesvete
- (Bosnia and Herzegovina) Ante Grbavac (GK) (back from loan at (Portugal) FC Porto)

Leaving

- (Poland) Patryk Walczak (LP) to (Poland) Wybrzeże Gdańsk
- (Poland) Damian Przytuła (LB) to (Romania) CSM București
- (Slovenia) Aleks Kavčič (LB) to (Hungary) Csurgói KK
- (Croatia) Luka Lovre Klarica (RB) to (Poland) Industria Kielce
- (Croatia) Roko Trivković (LP) to (Slovenia) RD Slovan
- (Bosnia and Herzegovina) Ante Grbavac (GK) to (Denmark) TMS Ringsted
- (Croatia) Davor Ćavar (LW) (to ?)
- (Croatia) Jakov Gojun (LB) (retires)

=== Transfer history ===
Transfers for the 2025–26 season

Joining

- (Georgia (country)) Giorgi Tskhovrebadze (RB) from (Germany) VfL Gummersbach
- (Serbia) Aleksa Tufegdžić (RW) from (Hungary) Csurgói KK
- (Montenegro) Haris Suljević (GK) from (Spain) CB Cangas
- (Belarus) Stanislau Sadouski (LW) from (Belarus) SKA Minsk
- (Croatia) Igor Karačić CB) from (Croatia) Industria Kielce
- (Serbia) Mateja Dodić (RW) (from (Serbia) RK Metaloplastika Elixir)
- (Croatia) Sandro Meštrić (GK) from (Belarus) HC Meshkov Brest

Leaving

- (Russia) Timur Dibirov (LW) (retires)
- (Croatia) Matej Mandić (GK) to (Germany) SC Magdeburg
- (Croatia) Paolo Kraljević (RW) to (Romania) SCM Politehnica Timișoara
- (Croatia) Zvonimir Srna (LB) (to (France) Montpellier Handball)
- (Croatia) Maksimilijan Molc (RW) (to (Croatia) MRK Sesvete)
- (Bosnia and Herzegovina) Adin Faljić (LP) to (Germany) SG Flensburg-Handewitt

=== Technical staff ===
- (Croatia) President: Mladen Vedriš
- (Croatia) Manager: Božidar Jović
- (Croatia) Head coach: Andrija Nikolić
- (Croatia) Assistant coach:
- (Croatia) Goalkeeper coach: Arian Jović
- (Croatia) Condition coach: Šime Tomašević
- (Croatia) Physiotherapist: Damir Kajba
- (Croatia) Physioterapist: Slobodan Škorić

== Notable former players ==
- (Croatia) Igor Vori
- (Croatia) Tonči Valčić
- (Croatia) Josip Valčić
- (Croatia) Patrik Ćavar
- (Croatia) Slavko Goluža
- (Croatia) Nenad Kljaić
- (Croatia) Bruno Gudelj
- (Croatia) Alvaro Načinović
- (Croatia) Božidar Jović
- (Croatia) Željko Babić
- (Croatia) Valter Matošević
- (Croatia) Vladimir Jelčić
- (Croatia) Mirko Bašić
- (Croatia) Valner Franković
- (Croatia) Vladimir Šujster
- (Croatia) Venio Losert
- (Croatia) Davor Dominiković
- (Croatia) Mirza Džomba
- (Croatia) Vlado Šola
- (Croatia) Blaženko Lacković
- (Croatia) Ivano Balić
- (Croatia) Renato Sulić
- (Croatia) Vedran Zrnić
- (Croatia) Damir Bičanić
- (Croatia) Nikola Blažičko
- (Croatia) Ivan Ninčević
- (Croatia) Domagoj Duvnjak
- (Croatia) Marko Kopljar
- (Croatia) Jakov Gojun
- (Croatia) Zlatko Horvat
- (Croatia) Goran Šprem
- (Croatia) Nikša Kaleb
- (Croatia) Denis Špoljarić
- (Croatia) Manuel Štrlek
- (Croatia) Ljubo Vukić
- (Croatia) Drago Vuković
- (Croatia) Marino Marić
- (Croatia) Mateo Hrvatin
- (Croatia) Ivan Pešić
- (Croatia) Ilija Brozović
- (Croatia) Luka Stepančić
- (Croatia) Filip Ivić
- (Croatia) Ivan Stevanović
- (Slovenia) Darko Cingesar (2016–2017)
- (Slovenia) David Špiler
- (Slovenia) Beno Lapajne
- (Slovenia) Dragan Gajić
- (Slovenia) Rolando Pušnik
- (Slovenia) Iztok Puc
- (Slovenia) Gorazd Škof
- (Slovenia) David Miklavčič
- (North Macedonia) Kiril Lazarov
- (North Macedonia) Lazo Majnov
- (North Macedonia) Mitko Stoilov
- (North Macedonia) Branislav Angelovski
- (North Macedonia) Risto Arnaudovski
- (North Macedonia) Velko Markoski
- (North Macedonia) Nenad Kosteski
- (Bosnia and Herzegovina) Nikola Prce
- (Bosnia and Herzegovina) Duško Čelica
- (Bosnia and Herzegovina) Mirsad Terzić
- (Croatia) Zlatko Saračević
- (Croatia) Irfan Smajlagić
- (Hungary) Gyula Gál
- (Hungary) Dávid Katzirz
- (Montenegro) Petar Kapisoda
- (Serbia) Dobrivoje Marković
- (Socialist Federal Republic of Yugoslavia) Lujo Györy
- (Socialist Federal Republic of Yugoslavia) Zdenko Zorko
- (Montenegro) Goran Stojanović
- (Norway) Frank Løke
- (Romania) Rareș Lucian Jurcă
- (Russia) Andrey Lavrov
- (China) Wang Quan

== Head coaches ==
- Kasim Kamenica (1988–1990)
- Zdravko Zovko (1990–1994)
- Vinko Kandija (1994–1995)
- Abas Arslanagić (1995–1996)
- Josip Glavaš (1996–1998)
- Velimir Kljaić (1998–1999)
- Zdravko Zovko (1999–2000)
- Lino Červar (2000–2001)
- Nino Marković (2001–2003)
- Silvio Ivandija (2003)
- Lino Červar (2004–2009)
- Ivica Obrvan (2009–2012)
- Slavko Goluža (2012–2013)
- Boris Dvoršek (2013–2014)
- Veselin Vujović (2014–2016)
- Andrija Nikolić (2016) (interim)
- Silvio Ivandija (2016–2017)
- Slavko Goluža (2017; interim)
- Kasim Kamenica (2017)
- Zlatko Saračević (2017–2018)
- Lino Červar (2018)
- Branko Tamše (2019)
- Veselin Vujović (2019–2020)
- Igor Vori (2020)
- Vlado Šola (2020–2021)
- Ivica Obrvan (2021–2022)
- Slavko Goluža (2022–2023)
- Nenad Šoštarić (2023–2024)
- Velimir Petković (2024–2025)
- Andrija Nikolić (2025)
- Nenad Šoštarić (2025–)
