= Marko Kopljar =

Croatian handball player (born 1986)

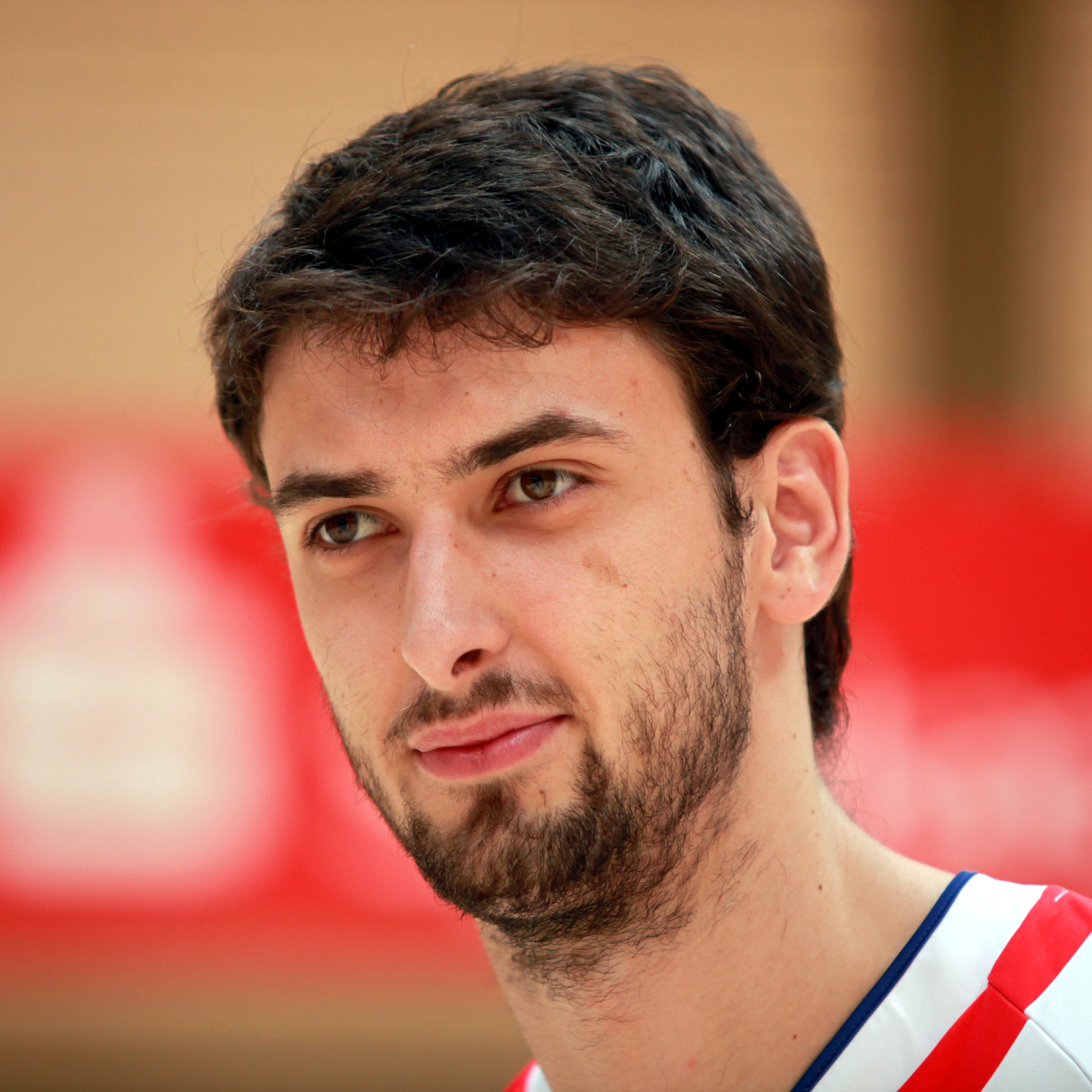

Personal information
- Nationality: Croatian
- Born: 12 February 1986 (age 40) Požega, SR Croatia, Yugoslavia
- Height: 2.10 m (6 ft 11 in)

Sport
- Sport: Handball
- Position: Right back

Senior clubs
- Years: Team
- 2003–2004: RK Požega
- 2004–2007: RK Medveščak
- 2007–2012: RK Zagreb
- 2007: → RK Đakovo (loan)
- 2008: → RK Metković (loan)
- 2012–2015: Paris Saint-Germain
- 2015–2016: FC Barcelona
- 2016–2017: Telekom Veszprém
- 2017–2024: Füchse Berlin
- 2025: SG Flensburg-Handewitt
National team
Years	Team	Apps	(Gls)
2008–2018	Croatia	155	(322)

Teams managed
- 2025–: 1. VfL Potsdam (assistant)
Medal record
Olympic Games
Bronze medal – third place	2012 London	Team
World Championship
Silver medal – second place	2009 Croatia
Bronze medal – third place	2013 Spain
European Championship
Silver medal – second place	2010 Austria
Bronze medal – third place	2012 Serbia
Bronze medal – third place	2016 Poland

Marko Kopljar (born 12 February 1986) is a retired Croatian handball player.

He competed at the 2012 Summer Olympics in London, winning the bronze medal.

== Honours ==
Zagreb

- Dukat Premier League: 2007–08, 2008–09, 2009–10, 2010–11, 2011–12
- Croatian Cup: 2008, 2009, 2010, 2011, 2012

PSG

- LNH Division 1: 2012-13, 2014-15
- Coupe de France: 2014, 2015
- Trophée des champions: 2014, 2015

Barcelona

- Liga ASOBAL: 2015-16
- Copa del Rey: 2015-16
- Copa ASOBAL: 2016
- Supercopa ASOBAL: 2015

Veszprém

- Nemzeti Bajnokság I: 2016-17
- Magyar Kupa: 2017

Füchse Berlin

- EHF European League: 2023
