= Manuel Štrlek =

Croatian handball player (born 1988)

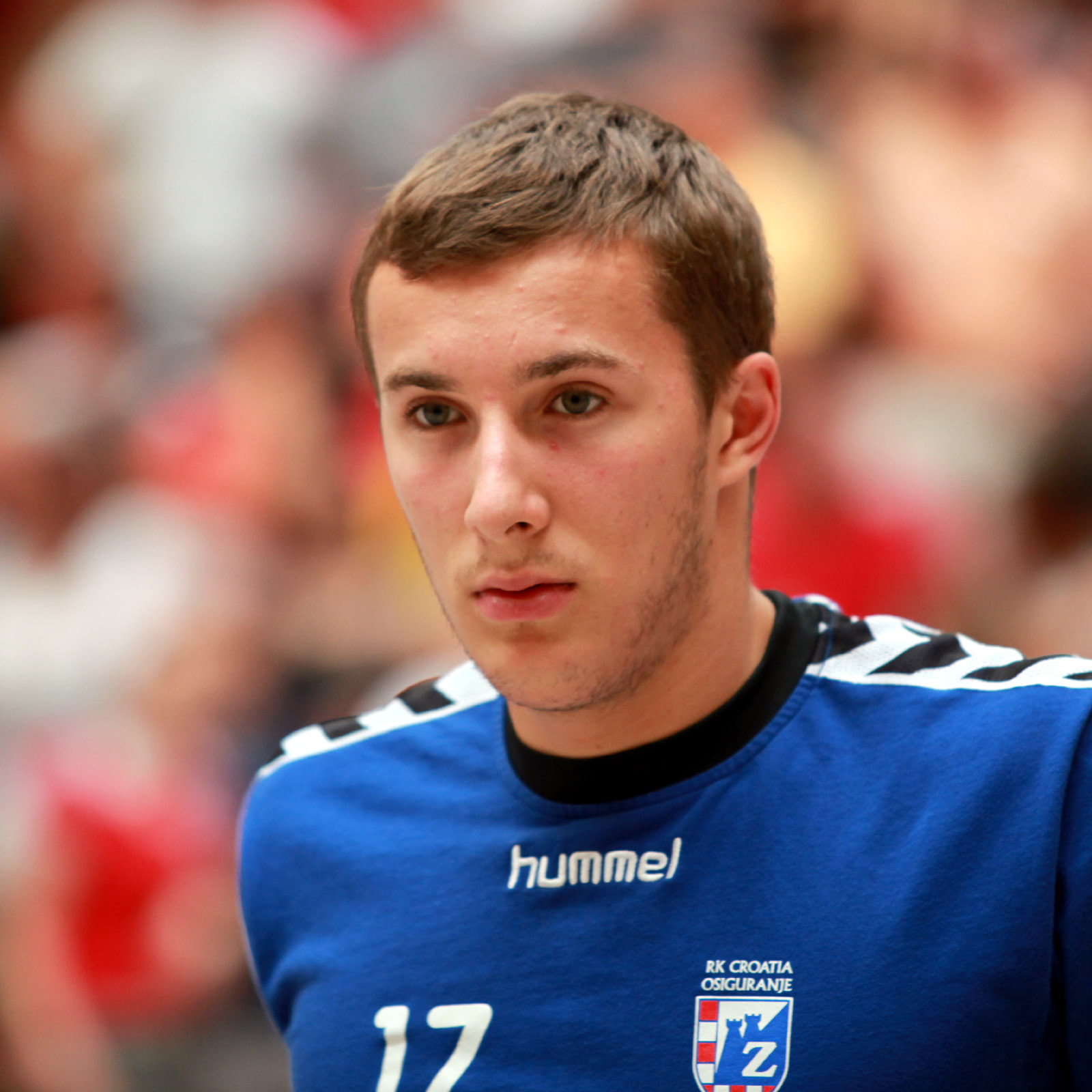

Personal information
- Nationality: Croatian
- Born: 1 December 1988 (age 37) Zagreb, SFR Yugoslavia
- Height: 1.81 m (5 ft 11 in)

Sport
- Sport: Handball
- Position: Left wing
- Current club: RK Nexe Našice
- Number: 26

Senior clubs
- Years: Team
- 2006–2012: RK Zagreb
- 2012–2018: PGE Vive Kielce
- 2018–2023: Telekom Veszprém
- 2023–: RK Nexe Našice
- 11/2024–2025: → Füchse Berlin
National team
Years	Team	Apps	(Gls)
2010–2021	Croatia	160	(588)
Medal record
Olympic Games
Bronze medal – third place	2012 London	Team
World Championships
Bronze medal – third place	2013 Spain
European Championships
Silver medal – second place	2010 Austria
Bronze medal – third place	2012 Serbia
Bronze medal – third place	2016 Poland

Manuel Štrlek (born 1 December 1988) is a Croatian handball player for RK Nexe Našice.

He was named to the All Star Team at the 2010, 2016 and the 2018 EHF European Championships.

With Füchse he won the 2024-25 Handball-Bundesliga, which was the first in club history. The same season he played in the 2024-25 EHF Champions League final, where Füchse lost to league rivals SC Magdeburg.

== Honours ==
=== Club ===
Zagreb

- Dukat Premier League: 2006–07, 2007–08, 2008–09, 2009–10, 2010–11, 2011–12
- Croatian Cup: 2007, 2008, 2009, 2010, 2011, 2012

Kielce

- EHF Champions League: 2015–16

Füchse

  - Handball-Bundesliga: 2024-25

=== Individual ===
- All-Star Left winger of the EHF Champions League: 2016
- Croatian handball player of the year: 2016
