= Denis Špoljarić =

Croatian handball player (born 1979)

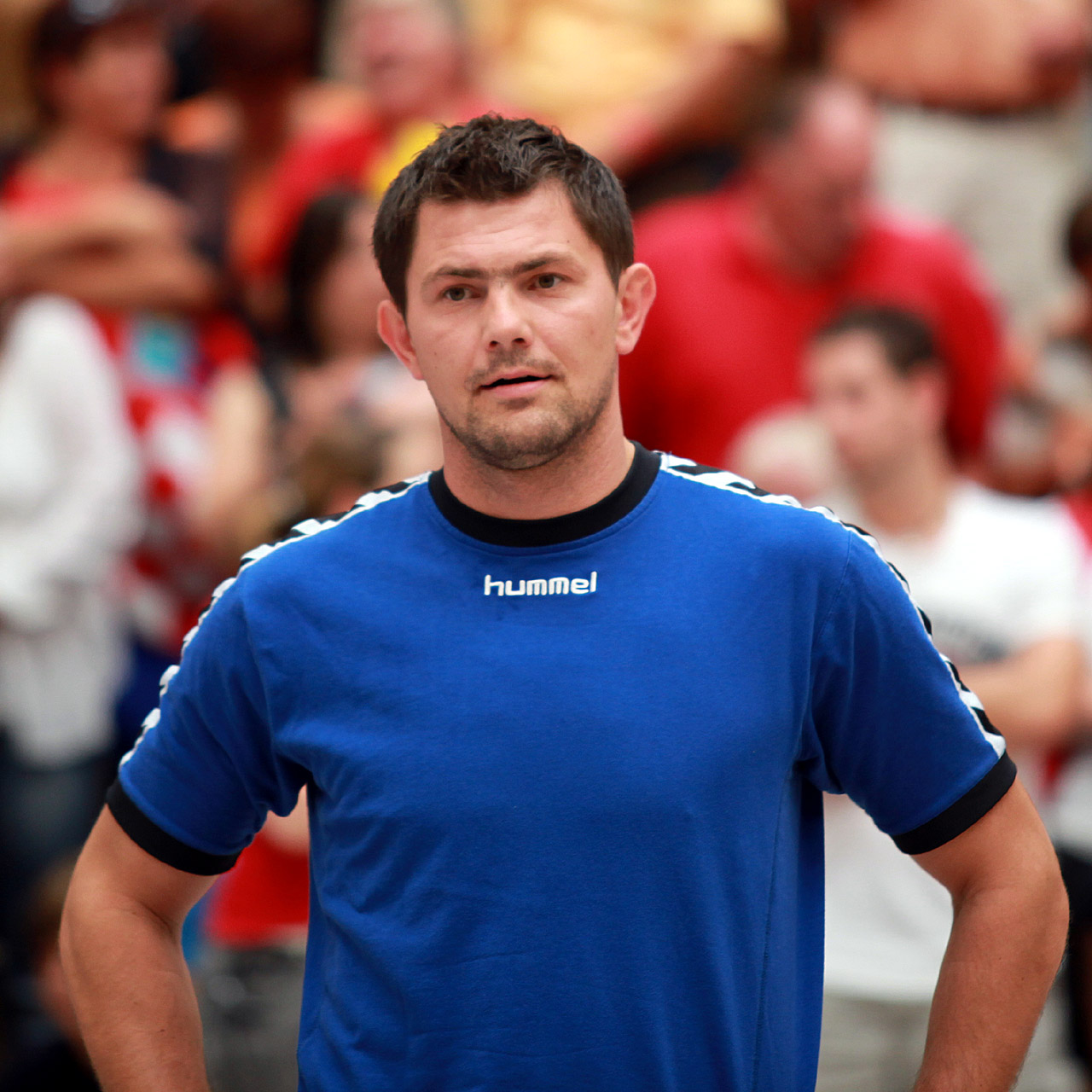

Personal information
- Full name: Denis Špoljarić
- Nationality: Croatian
- Born: 20 August 1979 (age 47) Dubrovnik, SFR Yugoslavia
- Height: 1.96 m (6 ft 5 in)

Sport
- Sport: Handball
- Position: Centre back
- Current club: RK Zagreb (assistant manager)

Senior clubs
- Years: Team
- 1997–2001: Badel 1862 Zagreb
- 2001–2002: Pfadi Winterthur
- 2002–2006: RK Zagreb
- 2006–2007: RK Pivovara Laško Celje
- 2007–2010: RK CO Zagreb
- 2010–2017: Füchse Berlin
National team
Years	Team	Apps	(Gls)
1999–2009	Croatia	131	(58)

Teams managed
- –: RK Zagreb (assistant)
- 2024–: Croatia (assistant)
Medal record
Representing Croatia
Men's handball
Olympic Games
Gold medal – first place	2004 Athens	Team
World Championship
Gold medal – first place	2003 Portugal	Team
Silver medal – second place	2005 Tunisia	Team
Silver medal – second place	2009 Croatia	Team
European Championship
Silver medal – second place	2008 Norway	Team
Statoil World Cup
Gold medal – first place	2006 Sweden & Germany	Team
Super Cup
Silver medal – second place	1999 Germany	Team

Denis Špoljarić (born 20 August 1979) is a Croatian former handball player who currently works as an assistant coach of RK Zagreb. He was a World champion in 2003 with the Croatian national team, and Olympic champion in 2004. He received a silver medal at the 2005 World Championship and a silver medal at the 2008 European Championship. During the 2000s in the national team he was known as "Minister of defense" due to his defensive capabilities.

In 2024 he became the assistant coach to Dagur Sigurðsson in the Croatian Handball Team and (as of 2026) he helped the team win two medals (2025, 2026).

== Honours ==
Zagreb

- Premier League
  - Winner (11): 1997–98, 1998–99, 1999–00, 2000–01, 2002–03, 2003–04, 2004–05, 2005–06, 2007–08, 2008–09, 2009–10
- Croatian Cup
  - Winner (10): 1998, 1999, 2000, 2001, 2003, 2004, 2005, 2006, 2008, 2009, 2010
- EHF Cup Winners' Cup
  - Finalist (1): 2005

Pfadi Winterthur

- Swiss League
  - Winner (1): 2001–02

Pivovara Laško Celje

- MIK 1. Liga
  - Winner (1): 2006–07
- Slovenian Cup
  - Winner (1): 2007
- EHF Men's Champions Trophy
  - Finalist (1): 2007

Füchse Berlin Reinickendorf.

- DHB-Pokal
  - Winner (1): 2014
- EHF Cup
  - Winner (1): 2015
- IHF Super Globe
  - Winner (1): 2015

Individual

- Franjo Bučar State Award for Sport - 2004

== Orders ==
- Order of Danica Hrvatska with face of Franjo Bučar - 2004
