= Josip Valčić =

Croatian handball player (born 1984)

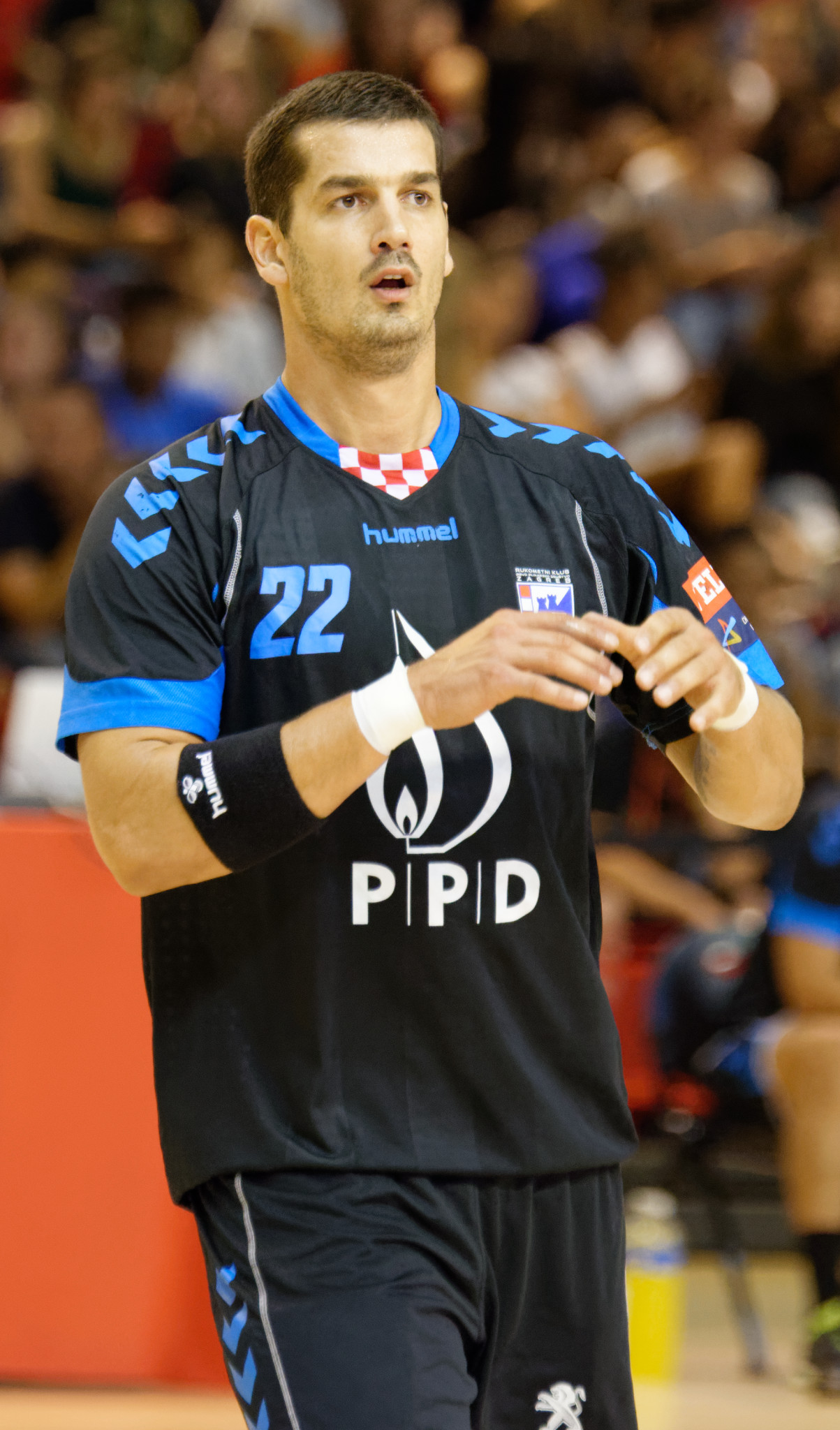

Personal information
- Nationality: Croatian
- Born: 21 April 1984 (age 42) Zadar, SFR Yugoslavia
- Height: 1.90 m (6 ft 3 in)

Sport
- Sport: Handball
- Position: Central back
- Number: 22

Senior clubs
- Years: Team
- 2001–2003: Brodomerkur Split
- 2003–2010: Croatia Osiguranje Zagreb
- 2010–2011: Gummersbach
- 2011–2018: RK Zagreb
National team
Years	Team	Apps	(Gls)
–	Croatia	30	(23)

Josip Valčić (born 21 April 1984) is a retired Croatian handball player.
