= RK Đakovo =

Croatian team handball club

- Full name: Rukometni klub Đakovo
- Founded: 1954; 71 years ago
- Arena: Gradska dvorana, Đakovo
- Capacity: 2,000
- President: Željko Pinterić
- Head coach: Daniel Špehar
- League: Dukat Premijer Liga
Home	Away

RK Đakovo is a team handball club from Đakovo, Croatia. It was established in 1954.

== Notable players ==
- (Croatia) Domagoj Duvnjak
- (Croatia) Marko Kopljar
