= Croatian Handball Premier League =

Sporting competition

Paket24 Premijer Liga
- Current season, competition or edition: 2025–26 Croatian Handball Premier League
- Sport: Handball
- Founded: 1991; 35 years ago
- No. of teams: 16
- Country: Croatia
- Confederation: EHF
- Most recent champion: RK Zagreb (2025–26)
- International cups: EHF Champions League; EHF European League; EHF European Cup; SEHA League
- Website: www.hrs.hr

The Croatian Handball Premier League (Croatian: Hrvatska rukometna premijer liga) is the highest men's handball league in Croatia. It is organized by the Croatian Handball Federation (Hrvatski rukometni savez). The league comprises 16 teams.

The league was formed in 1991 with the dissolution of the Yugoslav leagues.

== Format ==
In the first phase, eight teams from two groups compete in a home-and-away round-robin series. All teams advance from the regular season to one of two postseason stages, depending on their league position. The top four teams from the regular season play in the Championship Round, while the bottom four teams play in the Relegation Round. At the end of the season, the bottom finisher is automatically relegated to the second league.

== Current teams ==
=== Teams for season 2024–25 ===
Locations of teams in Paket24 Premijer Liga

Team	City
RK Zagreb	Zagreb
RK Nexe Našice	Našice
MRK Sesvete	Sesvete
HRK Gorica	Velika Gorica
RK Poreč	Poreč
RK Dubrava Zagreb	Zagreb
RK Metković-Mehanika	Metković
RK Rudar Rude	Rude
GRK Varaždin	Varaždin
RK Spačva Vinkovci	Vinkovci
RK Zamet	Rijeka
HRK Karlovac	Karlovac
MRK Trogir	Trogir
RK Osijek	Osijek
MRK Čakovec	Čakovec
RK Moslavina	Kutina

== Past champions ==
- 1992 : Zagreb Loto
- 1993 : Badel 1862 Zagreb (2)
- 1994 : Badel 1862 Zagreb (3)
- 1995 : Badel 1862 Zagreb (4)
- 1996 : Croatia banka Zagreb (5)
- 1997 : Badel 1862 Zagreb (6)
- 1998 : Badel 1862 Zagreb (7)
- 1999 : Badel 1862 Zagreb (8)
- 2000 : Badel 1862 Zagreb (9)
- 2001 : RK Zagreb (10)
- 2002 : RK Zagreb (11)
- 2003 : RK Zagreb (12)
- 2004 : RK Zagreb (13)
- 2005 : RK Zagreb (14)
- 2006 : RK Zagreb (15)
- 2007 : RK CO Zagreb (16)
- 2008 : RK CO Zagreb (17)
- 2009 : RK CO Zagreb (18)
- 2010 : RK CO Zagreb (19)
- 2011 : RK CO Zagreb (20)
- 2012: RK CO Zagreb (21)
- 2013 : RK Zagreb (22)
- 2014 : RK Zagreb (23)
- 2015 : RK PPD Zagreb (24)
- 2016 : RK PPD Zagreb (25)
- 2017: RK PPD Zagreb (26)
- 2018 : RK PPD Zagreb (27)
- 2019 : RK PPD Zagreb (28)
- 2020 : Voided due to the coronavirus pandemic
- 2021 : RK PPD Zagreb (29)
- 2022 : RK PPD Zagreb (30)
- 2023 : RK PPD Zagreb (31)
- 2024 : RK PPD Zagreb (32)
- 2025 : RK PPD Zagreb (33)
- 2026 : RK Zagreb (34)

	Club	Titles	Year
1.	RK Zagreb	34	1992, 1993, 1994, 1995, 1996, 1997, 1998, 1999, 2000, 2001, 2002*, 2003, 2004, 2005, 2006, 2007, 2008, 2009, 2010, 2011, 2012, 2013, 2014, 2015, 2016, 2017, 2018, 2019, 2021, 2022, 2023, 2024, 2025, 2026

- won by the green table

== EHF coefficients ==
The following data indicates Croatian coefficient rankings between European handball leagues.

Country ranking

EHF League Ranking for 2018/19 season:

- 6. (6) (Denmark) Danish Handball League (63.33)
- 7. (8) (North Macedonia) Macedonian Handball Super League (51.22)
- 8. (9) (Croatia) Croatian Handball Premier League (42.25)
- 9. (10) (Portugal) Portuguese Handball First Division (37.33)
- 10. (7) (Slovenia) Slovenian First League (men's handball) (36.67)

Club ranking

EHF Club Ranking as of 25 September 2025:

- 18. Zagreb (218)
- 20. Nexe Našice (202)
- 57. Sesvete (82)
- 94. Poreč (48)
- 143. Spačva Vinkovci (26)

== See also ==
- Croatian First League (women's handball)
- Yugoslav Handball Championship
