= RK Medveščak =

Croatian handball club

- Full name: Rukometni klub Medveščak NFD
- Founded: 1936
- Arena: ŠRC Šalata
- Capacity: -
- President: -
- Head coach: -
- League: Croatian Premier Handball League
Home	Away

Rukometni klub "Medveščak" is a handball club located in Zagreb, Croatia.

They are one of the more famous branches of the Medveščak sports society, named after the Medveščak neighbourhood of Zagreb. They play in the sports and recreational centre Šalata. Through history club was also known as Prvomajska, Coning Medveščak, Medveščak Osiguranje Zagreb, Medveščak Infosistem, Agram Medveščak and Medveščak NFD.

== Accomplishments ==
- National Championship of Yugoslavia: 4
  - 1953, 1954, 1964, 1966
- National Cup of Yugoslavia: 7
  - 1970, 1978, 1981, 1986, 1987, 1989, 1990
- EHF Champions League
  - runner-up 1964/65
- Limburgse Handbal Dagen: 1
  - 1993

== Notable players ==
- Josip Milković
- Zlatko Žagmeštar
- Ivan Uremović
- Dado Mervar
- Zdravko Miljak
- Zdenko Zorko
- Zdravko Zovko
- Željko Zovko
- Boris Jarak
- Goran Perkovac
- Dinko Vuleta
- Zlatko Saračević
- Irfan Smajlagić
- Nenad Kljaić
- Mirko Bašić
- Dobrivoje Selec
- Vlado Šola
- Tomislav Farkaš
- Ivo Glavinić
- Zvonimir Bilić
- Tonči Valčić
- Mario Kelentrić
- Dragan Jerković
- Patrik Ćavar
- Renato Sulić
- Ivan Čupić
- Mate Šunjić
- Drago Vukić
- Damir Bičanić
- Jani Čop
- Marko Kopljar
- Denis Buntić
- Ljubo Vukić
- Željko Musa
- Ante Kostelić
- Mario Obad
- Vjenceslav Somić
- Tomislav Huljina
- Vladimir Ostarčević
- Franjo Lelić
- Zoran Jeftić
- Ivan Knežević
- Perica Lelić
- Nikola Raič
- Vladimir Šujster

== Famous coaches ==
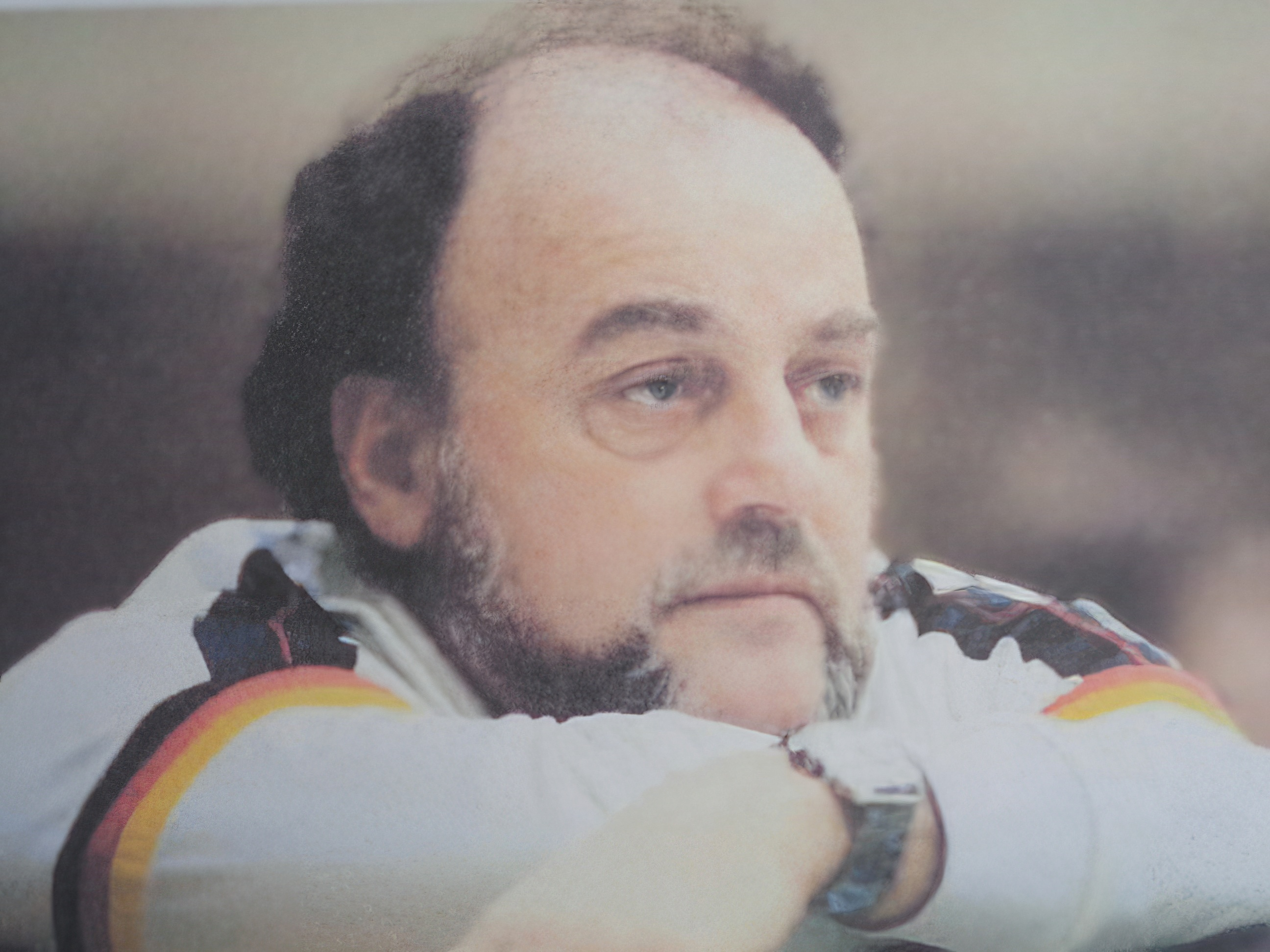
Vlado Stenzel

- Vlado Stenzel (Štencl)
- Josip Milković
- Velimir Kljaić
- Josip Šojat
- Abas Arslanagić
- Zlatko Lukić
- Pero Janjić
- Ante Kostelić
- Josip Glavaš
- Ivica Obrvan
- Mirko Bašić
- Vinko Tomljanović
- Boris Dvoršek
- Damir Štokić
- Željko Zovko
