= GRK Varaždin =

Croatian handball club

- Full name: Gradski rukometni klub Varaždin
- Founded: 1955; 71 years ago
- Arena: Varaždin Arena
- Capacity: 5,000
- President: Hrvoje Vojvoda
- Head coach: Branimir Žoldoš
- League: Croatian Premier League
- 2021–22: Croatian Premier League, 5th of 16

GRK Varaždin is a Croatian handball team from Varaždin. Their home matches are played at the Športska dvorana Varaždin. They compete in Dukat Premijer liga.

== European record ==
Season	Competition	Round	Club	1st leg	2nd leg	Aggregate
2016–17	EHF Cup	R1	(Turkey) BB Ankaraspor	24–32	27–26	51–58

== Team ==
=== Current squad ===
Squad for the 2016–17 season

Goalkeepers

- (Croatia) Domagoj Crnila
- (Croatia) Sandro Mestric
- (Croatia) Matija Spikic

Wingers
RW

- (Croatia) Bruno Dozet
- (Croatia) Petar Grbac
- (Croatia) Ante Tokic

LW

- (Croatia) Tomislav Hirs
- (Croatia) Ivan Laljek
- (Croatia) Jakov Turk

Line players

- (Croatia) Ivan Obrljan
- (Croatia) Marin Sipic

Back players
LB

- (Croatia) Patrik Ipsa
- (Croatia) Dominik Novak
- (Croatia) Andrej Obranovic
- (Croatia) Luka Trojko
- (Croatia) Sebastijan Vincek
- (Croatia) Frano Vujovic

CB

- (Croatia) Vedran Hud
- (Croatia) Ivan Koprek
- (Croatia) Bruno Levak
- (Croatia) Jurica Vidacek
- (Croatia) Luka Zrinski

RB

- (Croatia) Manuel Hutinec
- (Croatia) Bruno-Vili Zobec
