= 2005–06 RK Zamet season =

Zamet Rijeka
2005-06 season
- President: Petar Bracanović
- Coach: Boris Dragičević (until 27 Mar 2006); Mladen Prskalo (from 27 Mar 2006)
- Venue: Dvorana Mladosti
- Dukat 1.HRL: 6th
- Croatian Cup: Qualifying round

The 2005–06 season was the 49th season in RK Zamet’s history. It is their 5th successive season in the Dukat 1.HRL, and 29th successive top tier season.

== Competitions ==
=== Overall ===
Competition	First match	Last match	Starting round	Final position	Record							
Competition	First match	Last match	Starting round	Final position	G	W	D	L	GF	GA	GD	Win %
Dukat 1.HRL - Regular season	10 September 2005	30 November 2005	Matchday 1	3rd	14	8	2	4	405	383	+22	57.14
Dukat 1.HRL - Play-offs	20 December 2005	13 May 2006	Matchday 1	6th	15	0	1	14	393	477	−84	0.00
Total					29	8	3	18	798	860	−62	27.59

== First team squad ==
Goalkeeper

- 1 (Croatia) Damir Bobanović
- 12 (Croatia) Ivan Stevanović
- 16 (Croatia) Igor Saršon

Wingers
RW

- 6 (Croatia) Dario Černeka
- 8 (Croatia) Ivan Vrkljan
- (Croatia) Vladimir Gruičić

LW

- 4 (Croatia) Mateo Hrvatin
- 14 (Croatia) Marko Erstić

Line players

- 11 (Croatia) Adnan Kamberović
- 15 (Croatia) Mladen Prskalo
- 19 (Croatia) Marin Sakić
- 20 (Croatia) Damir Bogdanović

Back players
LB

- 3 (Croatia) Marko Bagarić
- 5 (Croatia) Jakov Gojun
- 9 (Croatia) Ivan Ćosić

CB

- 6 (Croatia) Marijan Bašić
- 14 (Croatia) Željko Gulin
- 17 (North Macedonia) Marjan Kolev
- 18 (Croatia) Mladen Laskač

RB

- 7 (Croatia) Milan Uzelac (captain)
- 13 (Croatia) Vedran Banić
- 19 (Croatia) Milan Kosanović

=== Technical staff ===
- (Croatia) President: Petar Bracanović
- (Croatia) Sports director: Damir Bogdanović (director-player)
- (Croatia) Technical director: Marin Miculinić
- (Croatia) Club Secretary: Daniela Juriša
- (Croatia) Head Coach: Boris Dragičević (until 27 Mar 2006)
- (Croatia) Head Coach: Mladen Prskalo (from 27 Mar 2006)
- (Croatia) Assistant Coach: Alen Kurbanović
- (Croatia) Fitness Coach: Sergio DePrivitellio
- (Croatia) Fizioterapist: Branimir Maričević
- (Croatia) Tehniko: Williams Černeka

== Dukat 1.HRL ==
=== Group B League table ===
	Club	P	W	D	L	G+	G−	Dif	Pts	Second Phase
1.	Perutnina PIPO IPC Čakovec	14	13	0	1	451	392	+59	26	Championship play-offs
2.	Poreč	14	9	1	4	419	397	+22	19	Championship play-offs
3.	Zamet Rijeka	14	8	2	4	405	383	+22	18	Championship play-offs
4.	Koteks Split	14	8	0	6	407	399	+8	16	Relegation play-offs
5.	Metković	14	5	0	9	416	428	-22	10	Relegation play-offs
6.	Moslavina Kutina	14	5	0	9	397	423	-26	10	Relegation play-offs
7.	Crikvenica	14	3	1	10	386	419	-33	7	Relegation play-offs
8	Gorica Velika Gorica	14	3	0	11	384	422	-38	6	Relegation play-offs

Source: Rk-zamet.hr

=== Matches ===
Round	Date	H/A	Opponent	Score	Venue	Report
1	10 Sep	H	Gorica	31:27	Dvorana Mladosti	rk-zamet.hr
2	14 Sep	A	Perutnina PIPO IPC Čakovec	32:29	Dvorana GŠ	rk-zamet.hr
3	17 Sep	H	Split	32:24	Dvorana Mladosti	rk-zamet.hr
4	21 Sep	A	Moslavina Kutina	32:24	SC Kutina	rk-zamet.hr
5	24 Sep	H	Metković	26:28	Dvorana Mladosti	rk-zamet.hr
6	1 Oct	A	Crikvenica	28:28	GSD Crikvenica	rk-zamet.hr
7	8 Oct	H	Poreč	34:32	Dvorana Mladosti	rk-zamet.hr
8	15 Oct	A	Gorica	21:22	Dvorana SŠ	rk-zamet.hr
9	22 Oct	H	Perutnina PIPO IPC Čakovec	29:30	Dvorana Mladosti	rk-zamet.hr
10	9 Nov	A	Split	32:23	Arena Gripe	rk-zamet.hr
11	12 Nov	H	Moslavina Kutina	33:28	Dvorana Mladosti	rk-zamet.hr
12	19 Nov	A	Metković	23:34	SD Metković	rk-zamet.hr
13	23 Nov	H	Crikvenica	27:22	Dvorana Mladosti	rk-zamet.hr
14	30 Nov	A	Poreč	28:28	GSD Crikvenica	rk-zamet.hr

=== Championship play-offs League table ===
	Club	P	W	D	L	G+	G−	Dif	Pts
1.	Zagreb	20	19	1	0	684	506	178	39
2.	Perutnina PIPO IPC Čakovec	20	12	1	7	624	617	7	25
3.	Agram Medveščak Zagreb	20	12	0	8	535	520	15	23 (-1)
4.	Poreč	20	7	2	11	558	586	-28	16
5.	Osijek Elektromodul	20	4	2	14	534	608	-74	10
6.	Zamet Rijeka	20	1	2	17	499	597	-98	4

=== Matches ===
Round	Date	H/A	Opponent	Score	Venue	Report
1	20 Dec	A	Zagreb	37:22	Kutija Šibica	Rk-zamet.hr
2	23 Dec	H	Osijek Elektromodul	25:27	Dvorana Mladosti	Rk-zamet.hr
3	8 Feb	H	Agram Medveščak	26:27	Dvorana Mladosti	Rk-zamet.hr
4	19 Feb	H	Zagreb	22:27	Dvorana Mladosti	Rk-zamet.hr
5	25 Feb	A	Osijek Elektromodul	25:24	Zrinjevac Sport Hall	Rk-zamet.hr
6	28 Feb	A	Agram Medveščak	23:18	Dom Sportova	Rk-zamet.hr
7	11 Mar	A	Zagreb	45:25	Kutija Šibica	Rk-zamet.hr
8	17 Mar	H	Poreč	29:36	Dvorana Mladosti	Rk-zamet.hr
9	25 Mar	A	Perutnina PIPO IPC Čakovec	36:32	Dvorana GŠ	Rk-zamet.hr
10	1 Apr	H	Osijek Elektromodul	30:30	Dvorana Mladosti	Rk-zamet.hr
11	7 Apr	A	Agram Medveščak	33:24	Dom Sportova	Rk-zamet.hr
12	21 Apr	H	Zagreb	25:29	Dvorana Mladosti	Rk-zamet.hr
13	9 May	A	Poreč	39:34	SRC Veli Jože	Rk-zamet.hr
14	5 Mar	A	Perutnina PIPO IPC Čakovec	26:34	Dvorana GŠ	Rk-zamet.hr
15	13 May	A	Osijek Elektromodul	34:31	Zrinjevac Sport Hall	Rk-zamet.hr
