= 2003–04 RK Zamet season =

Zamet Crotek
2003-04 season
- President: Petar Bracanović
- Coach: Zlatko Saračević (until 22 Mar 2004); Franko Mileta (from 22 Mar 2004)
- Venue: Dvorana Mladosti
- 1.HRL: 4th
- Croatian Cup: Fourth place
- Highest home attendance: 2,000 v Zagreb (25 February 2018 - Dvorana Mladosti)

The 2003–04 season was the 47th season in RK Zamet’s history. It is their 3rd successive season in the 1.HRL, and 27th successive top tier season.

== Competitions ==
=== Overall ===
Competition	First match	Last match	Starting round	Final position	Record							
Competition	First match	Last match	Starting round	Final position	G	W	D	L	GF	GA	GD	Win %
1.HRL - Regular season	13 September 2003	20 December 2003	Matchday 1	3rd	15	10	1	4	421	361	+60	66.67
1.HRL - Play-offs	21 February 2004	29 May 2004	Matchday 1	4th	15	6	0	9	398	406	−8	40.00
Croatian Cup	7 February 2004	9 June 2004	Round of 16	Fourth place	4	2	0	2	108	106	+2	50.00
Total					34	18	1	15	927	873	+54	52.94

== First team squad ==
Goalkeeper

- 1 (Croatia) Nikola Blažičko
- 12 (Croatia) Ivan Stevanović
- 16 (Croatia) Igor Saršon

Wingers
RW

- 6 (Croatia) Danijel Ivanac
- 8 (Croatia) Tadej Široka
- 21 (Croatia) Boris Batinić

LW

- 4 (Croatia) Mateo Hrvatin
- 19 (Croatia) Ivan Pongračić

Line players

- 2 (Croatia) Damir Bogdanović
- 5 (Croatia) Božidar Jović (retired at end of December)
- 9 (Croatia) Adnan Kamberović
- 11 (Croatia) Mirjan Horvat
- 15 (Croatia) Dalibor Zupčić

Back players
LB

- 3 (Croatia) Marko Bagarić
- 10 (Croatia) Robert Savković
- 11 (Croatia) Stjepan Krolo
- 14 (Croatia) Tino Černjul

CB

- 17 (Croatia) Vladimir Ostarčević
- 18 (Croatia) Dino Dragičević
- 20 (Croatia) Igor Pejić

RB

- 5 (Croatia) Davor Šunjić
- 7 (Croatia) Milan Uzelac (captain)
- 13 (Croatia) Vedran Banić

=== Technical staff ===
- (Croatia) President: Petar Bracanović
- (Croatia) Sports director: Damir Bogdanović (director-player)
- (Croatia) Technical director: Marin Miculinić
- (Croatia) Club Secretary: Daniela Juriša
- (Croatia) Head Coach: Zlatko Saračević (until 22 March 2004)
- (Croatia) Head Coach: Franko Mileta (from 22 March 2004)
- (Croatia) Assistant Coach: Damir Čavlović (until 22 March 2004)
- (Croatia) Assistant Coach: Sergio DePrivitellio
- (Croatia) Fizioterapist: Marinko Anić
- (Croatia) Tehniko: Williams Černeka

== 1. HRL ==
=== First phase ===
	Club	P	W	D	L	G+	G−	Dif	Pts	Qualification
1.	Zagreb	15	15	0	0	489	373	+116	30	Championship play-offs
2.	Metković	15	12	1	2	460	384	+76	25	Championship play-offs
3.	Zamet Crotek Rijeka	15	10	1	4	421	361	+60	21	Championship play-offs
4.	Medveščak Infosistem Zagreb	15	10	1	4	434	383	+51	21	Championship play-offs
5.	Osijek Elektromodul	15	10	0	5	409	390	+29	20	Championship play-offs
6.	Perutnina PIPO IPC Čakovec	15	9	1	5	422	405	+19	19	Championship play-offs
7.	Crikvenica	15	9	1	5	417	381	+36	19	Relegation play-offs
8.	Dubrava Zagreb	15	6	0	9	452	476	-24	12	Relegation play-offs
9.	Split	15	3	4	8	367	412	-45	10	Relegation play-offs
10.	Đakovo	15	4	2	9	375	411	-36	10	Relegation play-offs
11.	Bjelovar	15	5	0	10	418	423	-5	10	Relegation play-offs
12.	Varteks di Caprio Varaždin	15	4	2	9	363	402	-39	10	Relegation play-offs
13.	Ekol Ivančica Ivanec	15	4	2	9	384	433	-49	10	Relegation play-offs
14.	Moslavina Kutina	15	3	3	9	388	449	-61	9	Relegation play-offs
15.	Umag	15	2	3	10	366	437	-71	7	Relegation play-offs
16.	Karlovac	15	3	1	11	393	438	-45	7	Relegation play-offs

=== Matches ===
Round	Date	H/A	Opponent	Score	Venue	Report
1	13 Sep	A	Ekol Ivančica	24:27	DSŠ Ivanec	rk-zamet.hr
2	19 Sep	H	Medveščak Infosistem	28:27	Dvorana Mladosti	rk-zamet.hr
3	27 Sep	A	Dubrava	25:29	SD Dubrava	rk-zamet.hr
4	5 Oct	H	Metković	31:31	SD Metković	rk-zamet.hr
5	11 Oct	A	Crikvenica	19:17	GSD Crikvenica	rk-zamet.hr
6	18 Oct	H	Varteks Di Caprio	34:22	Dvorana Mladosti	rk-zamet.hr
7	25 Oct	A	Split	27:24	Arena Gripe	rk-zamet.hr
8	5 Nov	H	Đakovo	27:21	GD Đakovo	rk-zamet.hr
9	8 Nov	A	Moslavina Kutina	26:34	ŠC Kutina	rk-zamet.hr
10	22 Nov	A	Osijek Elektromodul	22:21	Zrinjevac Sport Hall	rk-zamet.hr
11	29 Nov	A	Karlovac	22:27	Dvorana Mladost	rk-zamet.hr
12	5 Dec	H	Zagreb	25:31	Dvorana Mladosti	armada-rijeka.hr
13	9 Dec	H	Bjelovar	34:25	Dvorana Mladosti	rk-zamet.hr
14	13 Dec	A	Umag	19:26	Stella Maris	rk-zamet.hr
15	13 Dec	H	Perutnina Pipo IPC	37:20	Dvorana Mladosti	rk-zamet.hr

=== Second phase ===
	Club	P	W	D	L	G+	G−	Dif	Pts
1.	Zagreb	20	18	0	2	618	515	103	36
2.	Metković	20	11	3	6	588	510	78	25
3.	Perutnina PIP IPC Čakovec	20	10	2	8	562	592	-30	22
4.	Zamet Crotek Rijeka	20	8	1	11	540	537	3	17
5.	Medveščak Infosistem Zagreb	20	6	0	14	526	537	-9	12
6.	Osijek Elektromodul	20	3	2	15	519	610	-109	8

=== Matches ===
Round	Date	H/A	Opponent	Score	Venue	Report
1	21 Feb	A	Medveščak Infosistem	30:28	Dom Sportova	rk-zamet.hr
2	28 Feb	H	Osijek Elektromodul	28:24	Zrinjevac Sport Hall	rk-zamet.hr
3	6 Mar	A	Zagreb	32:28	Kutija Šibica	rk-zamet.hr
4	13 Mar	A	Metković	30:21	SD Metković	rk-zamet.hr
5	20 Mar	A	Perutnina Pipo IPC	33:30	Dvorana GŠ	rk-zamet.hr
6	31 Mar	A	Medveščak Infosistem	23:29	Dom Sportova	rk-zamet.hr
7	17 Apr	A	Osijek Elektromodul	26:24	Zrinjevac Sport Hall	rk-zamet.hr
8	25 Apr	H	Metković	21:26	Zrinjevac Sport Hall	rk-zamet.hr
9	30 Apr	A	Zagreb	40:27	Kutija Šibica	rk-zamet.hr
10	5 May	H	Peutnina Pipo IPC	34:24	Dvorana Mladosti	rk-zamet.hr
11	8 May	H	Medveščak Infosistem	27:23	Dvorana Mladosti	rk-zamet.hr
12	12 May	H	Osijek Elektromodul	27:19	Dvorana Mladosti	rk-zamet.hr
13	15 May	A	Metković	23:27	SD Metković	rk-zamet.hr
14	19 May	A	Zagreb	22:23	Dvorana Mladosti	rk-zamet.hr
15	29 May	A	Perutnina Pipo IPC	30:25	Dvorana GŠ	rk-zamet.hr

== Croatian Cup ==
=== Matches ===
Date	Phase of competition	Opponent	Score	Venue
7 Feb 2004	Round of 16	Split	20:25	Arena Gripe
3 Mar 2004	Quarter final	Zadar	25:27	ARENA Mocire
8 June 2004	Semi final	Metković	27:31	SD Metković
9 June 2004	Third place match	Zadar	30:29	SD Metković
