= 2002–03 RK Zamet season =

Zamet Crotek
2002-03 season
- President: Miljenko Mišljenović
- Coach: Damir Čavlović (until 27 Feb 2003); Zlatko Saračević (from 27 Feb 2003)
- Venue: Dvorana Mladosti
- 1.HRL: 5th
- Croatian Cup: Semi final
- EHF Cup: Round 4
- Highest home attendance: 2,500 vs Lukoil-Dynamo Astrakhan (14 December 2002 - Dvorana Mladosti)
- Lowest home attendance: 300 vs SKA Minsk (13 October 2002 - Dvorana Mladosti)
- Average home league attendance: 1,000

The 2002–03 season was the 46th season in RK Zamet’s history. It is their 2nd successive season in the 1.HRL, and 26th successive top tier season.

== First team squad ==
Goalkeeper

- 1 (Croatia) Nikola Blažičko
- 12 (Croatia) Ivan Stevanović
- 16 (Croatia) Igor Saršon
- 20 (Croatia) Vedran Šimunović

Wingers
RW

- 3 (Croatia) Tadej Široka
- 8 (Croatia) Boris Batinić

LW

- 4 (Croatia) Mateo Hrvatin
- 15 (Croatia) Janko Mavrović
- 19 (Croatia) Ivan Pongračić

Line players

- 2 (Croatia) Damir Bogdanović
- 11 (Croatia) Mirjan Horvat
- 14 (Croatia) Dalibor Zupčić

Back players
LB

- 10 (Croatia) Robert Savković
- 14 (Croatia) Tino Černjul
- 17 (Bosnia and Herzegovina) Zlatko Saračević (retired at end of December)

CB

- 17 (Croatia) Vladimir Ostarčević
- 18 (Croatia) Marko Bagarić

RB

- 5 (Croatia) Davor Šunjić
- 7 (Croatia) Milan Uzelac (captain)
- 13 (Croatia) Vedran Banić

=== Technical staff ===
- (Croatia) President: Miljenko Mišljenović
- (Croatia) Sports director: Damir Bogdanović (director-player)
- (Bosnia and Herzegovina) Marketing director: Zlatko Saračević
- (Croatia) Club Secretary: Daniela Juriša
- (Croatia) Head Coach: Damir Čavlović (until 27 February 2003)
- (Bosnia and Herzegovina) Head Coach: Zlatko Saračević (from 27 February 2003)
- (Croatia) Assistant Coach: Sergio DePrivitellio
- (Croatia) Fizioterapist: Marinko Anić
- (Croatia) Tehniko: Marin Miculinić

== Competitions ==
=== Overall ===
Competition	First match	Last match	Starting round	Final position	Record							
Competition	First match	Last match	Starting round	Final position	G	W	D	L	GF	GA	GD	Win %
1.HRL	21 September 2002	12 May 2003	Matchday 1	5th	30	16	2	12	805	762	+43	53.33
Croatian Cup	7 February 2003	17 May 2003	Round of 16	Semi final	5	4	0	1	150	135	+15	80.00
EHF Cup	12 October 2002	14 December 2002	Round 2	Round 4	6	3	0	3	114	125	−11	50.00
Total					41	23	2	16	1,069	1,022	+47	56.10

== EHF Cup ==
=== Matches ===
12 October 2002 Round 2	SKA Minsk (Belarus)	20:28	(Croatia) Zamet Crotek Rijeka	Rijeka, Croatia
18:00 CEST (UTC+02:00)		Report		Stadium: Dvorana Mladosti; Attendance: 500; Referee: Igor Karlubik & Slavomir Struhar (Slovakia)

13 October 2002 Round 2	Zamet Crotek Rijeka (Croatia)	21:24	(Belarus) SKA Minsk	Rijeka, Croatia
11:00 CEST (UTC+02:00)		Report		Stadium: Dvorana Mladosti; Attendance: 300; Referee: Igor Karlubik & Slavomir Struhar (Slovakia)

15 November 2002 Round 3	Zamet Crotek Rijeka (Croatia)	27:24	(Netherlands) Wealer Geleen HB	Rijeka, Croatia
18:00 CEST (UTC+02:00)		Report		Stadium: Dvorana Mladosti; Attendance: 1,200; Referee: Ivan Bashev & Georgi Dobrev (Bulgaria)

16 November 2002 Round 3	Wealer Geleen HB (Netherlands)	18:20	(Croatia) Zamet Crotek Rijeka	Rijeka, Croatia
18:00 CEST (UTC+02:00)		Report		Stadium: Dvorana Mladosti; Attendance: 2,100; Referee: Ivan Bashev & Georgi Dobrev (Bulgaria)

8 December 2002 Round 4	Lukoil-Dynamo Astrakhan (Russia)	29:18	(Croatia) Zamet Crotek Rijeka	Astrakhan, Russia
14:00 CEST (UTC+02:00)		Report		Stadium: Dvorets Sporta; Attendance: 1,000; Referee: Gheorghe Bejenariu & Octavian Pripas (Romania)

14 December 2002 Round 4	Zamet Crotek Rijeka (Croatia)	0:10	(Russia) Lukoil-Dynamo Astrakhan	Rijeka, Croatia
20:00 CEST (UTC+02:00)		Report		Stadium: Dvorana Mladosti; Attendance: 2,500; Referee: Koullis Kaplanis & Telemachos Savvides (Cyprus)

== 1. HRL ==
=== League table ===
.	Club	P	W	D	L	G+	G−	Dif	Pts
1.	Zagreb	30	29	0	1	997	749	248	58
2.	Metković Jambo	30	23	0	7	872	799	73	46
3.	Medveščak Infosistem Zagreb	30	18	2	10	867	792	75	38
4.	Bjelovar	30	17	2	11	816	792	24	36
5.	Zamet Crotek Rijeka	30	16	2	12	805	762	43	34
6.	Varteks di Caprio Varaždin	30	16	1	13	744	727	17	33
7.	Umag	30	15	1	14	801	782	19	31
8.	Moslavina Kutina	30	15	1	14	856	847	9	31
9.	Perutnina PIPO IPC Čakovec	30	13	2	15	846	843	23	28
10.	Osijek 2000	30	12	3	15	758	787	-29	27
11.	Crikvenica	30	13	1	16	778	840	-72	27
12.	Dubrava Zagreb	30	11	1	18	759	806	-47	23
13.	Ekol Ivančica Ivanec	30	11	0	19	719	846	-127	22
14.	Split	30	9	2	19	750	811	-61	20
15.	Karlovac	30	7	1	22	767	847	-80	15
16.	Đakovo	30	5	1	24	759	864	-105	11

=== Matches ===
Round	Date	H/A	Opponent	Score	Venue	Report
1	21 Sep	H	Bjelovar	22:23	Dvorana Mladosti	rk-zamet.hr
2	26 Sep	H	Split	33:29	Dvorana Mladosti	rk-zamet.hr
3	28 Sep	A	RK Zagreb	25:22	Kutija Šibica	rk-zamet.hr
4	5 Oct	H	Dubrava Zagreb	25:22	Dvorana Mladosti	rk-zamet.hr
5	9 Oct	H	Moslavina Kutina	30:26	Dvorana Mladosti	rk-zamet.hr
6	19 Oct	H	Đakovo	26:22	Dvorana Mladosti	rk-zamet.hr
7	23 Oct	A	Umag	20:20	Stella Maris	rk-zamet.hr
8	26 Oct	H	Ekol Ivančica	27:17	Dvorana Mladosti	rk-zamet.hr
9	30 Oct	A	Varteks Di Caprio	28:26	ŠD Graberje	rk-zamet.hr
10	2 Nov	A	Metković Jambo	25:19	SD Metković	rk-zamet.hr
11	12 Nov	H	Medveščak Infosistem	20:20	Stella Maris	rk-zamet.hr
12	20 Nov	A	Osijek 2000	21:20	Zrinjevac Sport Hall	rk-zamet.hr
13	26 Nov	A	Split	29:31	Arena Gripe	rk-zamet.hr
14	30 Nov	H	Crikvenica	21:19	Dvorana Mladosti	rk-zamet.hr
15	11 Dec	H	Perutnina PIPO IPC	24:28	Dvorana Mladosti	rk-zamet.hr
16	17 Dec	A	Karlovac	24:23	Dvorana Mladost	rk-zamet.hr
17	15 Feb	A	Bjelovar	34:26	ŠSD Bjelovar	rk-zamet.hr
18	22 Feb	H	Zagreb	23:32	Dvorana Mladosti	rk-zamet.hr
19	2 Mar	A	Dubrava Zagreb	22:28	SD Dubrava	rk-zamet.hr
20	8 Mar	A	Moslavina Kutina	29:32	ŠC Kutina	rk-zamet.hr
21	15 Mar	H	Varteks Di Caprio	29:22	Dvorana Mladosti	rk-zamet.hr
22	19 Mar	A	Đakovo	27:36	GD Đakovo	rk-zamet.hr
23	22 Mar	H	Umag	31:24	Dvorana Mladosti	rk-zamet.hr
24	29 Mar	A	Ekol Ivančica	26:34	DSŠ Ivanec	rk-zamet.hr
25	2 Apr	H	Metković Jambo	35:32	Dvorana Mladosti	rk-zamet.hr
26	9 Apr	A	Medveščak Infosistem	29:27	Dom Sportova	rk-zamet.hr
27	12 Apr	H	Osijek 2000	34:26	Dvorana Mladosti	rk-zamet.hr
28	23 Apr	A	Crikvenica	31:29	GSD Crikvenica	rk-zamet.hr
29	2 May	A	Perutnina PIPO IPC	32:17	Dvorana GŠ	rk-zamet.hr
30	12 May	H	Karlovac	34:26	Dvorana Mladosti	rk-zamet.hr

== Croatian Cup ==
=== Matches ===
Date	Phase of competition	Opponent	Score	Venue
7 Feb 2003	Round of 16	Buzet BUP	37:24	Dvorana Mladosti
12 Feb 2003	Round of 16	Buzet BUP	22:29	SD Buzet
12 Mar 2003	Quarter final	Moslavina Kutina	29:22	Dvorana Mladosti
26 Mar 2003	Quarter final	Moslavina Kutina	22:28	Dvorana Mladosti
17 May 2003	Semi final	RK Zagreb	27:45	Stella Maris
