= 2004–05 RK Zamet season =

Zamet Rijeka
2004-05 season
- President: Petar Bracanović
- Coach: Franko Mileta (until 22 Dec 2004); Williams Černeka (from 22 Dec 2004) (interim)
- Venue: Dvorana Mladosti
- 1.HRL: 14th
- Croatian Cup: Round of 16

The 2004–05 season was the 48th season in RK Zamet’s history. It is their 4th successive season in the 1.HRL, and 28th successive top tier season.

== Competitions ==
=== Overall ===
Competition	First match	Last match	Starting round	Final position	Record							
Competition	First match	Last match	Starting round	Final position	G	W	D	L	GF	GA	GD	Win %
1.HRL - Regular season	18 September 2004	22 December 2004	Matchday 1	7th	15	8	1	6	446	416	+30	53.33
1.HRL - Play-offs	19 February 2005	18 May 2005	Matchday 1	14th	18	7	1	10	540	530	+10	38.89
Croatian Cup	12 February 2005	12 February 2005	Round of 16	Round of 16	1	0	0	1	32	33	−1	0.00
Total					34	15	2	17	1,018	979	+39	44.12

== First team squad ==
Goalkeeper

- 12 (Croatia) Ivan Stevanović
- 16 (Croatia) Igor Saršon

Wingers
RW

- 8 (Croatia) Tadej Široka
- 18 (Croatia) Davor Rokavec

LW

- 4 (Croatia) Mateo Hrvatin
- 20 (Croatia) Marko Erstić

Line players

- 11 (Croatia) Mirjan Horvat
- 15 (Croatia) Dalibor Zupčić
- 19 (Croatia) Adnan Kamberović
- 20 (Croatia) Damir Bogdanović

Back players
LB

- 3 (Croatia) Marko Bagarić
- 9 (Croatia) Ivan Ćosić
- 10 (Croatia) Jakov Gojun
- 14 (Croatia) Tino Černjul

CB

- 5 (Croatia) Željko Gulin
- 11 (Slovakia) Michal Jančo
- 17 (Ukraine) Jurij Hauha

RB

- 2 (Croatia) Davor Šunjić
- 7 (Croatia) Milan Uzelac (captain)
- 8 (Croatia) Milan Kosanović
- 13 (Croatia) Vedran Banić

=== Technical staff ===
- (Croatia) President: Petar Bracanović
- (Croatia) Sports director: Damir Bogdanović (director-player)
- (Croatia) Technical director: Marin Miculinić
- (Croatia) Club Secretary: Daniela Juriša
- (Croatia) Head Coach: Franko Mileta (until 22 Dec 2004)
- (Croatia) Head Coach: Williams Černeka (from 22 Dec 2004)
- (Croatia) Assistant Coach: Williams Černeka
- (Croatia) Fitness Coach: Sergio DePrivitellio
- (Croatia) Tehniko: Valter Marković

== 1. HRL ==
=== First phase ===
	Club	P	W	D	L	G+	G−	Dif	Pts	
1.	Zagreb	15	14	1	0	479	349	+130	29	Championship play-offs
2.	Metković	15	9	3	3	449	396	+53	21	Championship play-offs
3.	Medveščak Infosistem Zagreb	15	9	2	4	428	419	+9	20	Championship play-offs
4.	Osijek Elektromodul	15	8	2	5	450	427	+23	18	Championship play-offs
5.	Moslavina Kutina	15	8	2	5	450	453	-3	18	Championship play-offs
6.	Perutnina PIPO IPC Čakovec	15	8	1	6	472	431	+41	17	Championship play-offs
7.	Zamet Rijeka	15	8	1	6	446	416	+30	17	Relegation play-offs
8.	Gorica Velika Gorica	15	7	1	7	440	434	+6	15	Relegation play-offs
9.	Split	15	6	1	8	459	468	-9	13	Relegation play-offs
10.	Ekol Ivančica Ivanec	15	6	1	8	429	468	-39	13	Relegation play-offs
11.	Crikvenica	15	6	1	8	414	457	-33	13	Relegation play-offs
12.	Karlovac	15	5	2	8	401	417	-16	12	Relegation play-offs
13.	Varteks di Caprio Varaždin	15	6	0	9	390	414	-24	12	Relegation play-offs
14.	Đakovo	15	5	1	9	410	434	-24	11	Relegation play-offs
15.	Dubrava Zagreb	15	3	1	11	441	484	-43	7	Relegation play-offs
16.	Zadar Eva	15	2	0	13	386	462	-76	4	Relegation play-offs

Source: Rk-zamet.hr

=== Matches ===
Round	Date	H/A	Opponent	Score	Venue	Report
1	18 Sep	H	Medveščak Infosistem	24:32	Dvorana Mladosti	rk-zamet.hr
2	25 Sep	A	Karlovac	29:29	SD Mladost	rk-zamet.hr
3	29 Sep	H	Split	34:24	Dvorana Mladosti	rk-zamet.hr
4	2 Oct	A	Metković	29:26	SD Metković	rk-zamet.hr
5	16 Oct	H	Dubrava Zagreb	33:28	Dvorana Mladosti	rk-zamet.hr
6	20 Oct	H	Osijek Elektromodul	36:30	Dvorana Mladosti	rk-zamet.hr
7	23 Oct	A	Ekol Ivančica	32:28	DSŠ Ivanec	rk-zamet.hr
8	30 Oct	H	Peurtnina Pipo IPC	36:30	Dvorana Mladosti	rk-zamet.hr
9	9 Nov	A	Zagreb	27:24	Kutija Šibica	rk-zamet.hr
10	13 Nov	H	Gorica	30:27	Dvorana Mladosti	rk-zamet.hr
11	27 Nov	A	Crikvenica	28:27	GSD Crikvenica	rk-zamet.hr
12	4 Dec	H	Varteks Di Caprio Varaždin	28:27	Dvorana Mladosti	rk-zamet.hr
13	11 Dec	A	RK Zadar Eva	19:27	SD Zadar	rk-zamet.hr
14	18 Dec	H	Moslavina Kutina	38:21	Dvorana Mladosti	rk-zamet.hr
15	22 Dec	A	Đakovo	31:26	Dvorana Mladosti	rk-zamet.hr

=== Second phase ===
	Club	P	W	D	L	G+	G−	Dif	Pts
1.	Split	18	11	0	7	639	506	+129	25
2.	Đakovo	18	10	1	7	558	543	+15	22
3.	Karlovac	18	10	0	8	525	516	+9	22
4.	Crikvenica	18	9	1	8	503	501	+2	21
5.	Gorica Velika Gorica	18	6	5	7	564	553	+11	21
6.	Dubrava Zagreb	18	9	2	7	531	533	-2	20
7.	Varteks di Caprio Varaždin	18	8	2	8	549	541	+8	19
8.	Zamet Rijeka	18	7	1	10	540	530	+10	19
9.	Zadar Eva	18	9	1	8	512	526	-14	19
10.	Ekol Ivančica Ivanec	18	4	1	13	548	603	-55	12

=== Matches ===
Round	Date	H/A	Opponent	Score	Venue	Report
1	19 Feb	H	RK Zadar Eva	35:26	Dvorana Mladosti	rk-zamet.hr
2	22 Feb	H	Gorica	29:29	Dvorana Mladosti	rk-zamet.hr
3	26 Feb	A	Split	35:30	Arena Gripe	rk-zamet.hr
4	5 Mar	H	Ekol Ivančica	35:32	Dvorana Mladosti	rk-zamet.hr
5	16 Mar	H	Karlovac	29:24	Dvorana Mladosti	rk-zamet.hr
6	19 Mar	A	Varteks Di Caprio	35:29	ŠD Varaždin	rk-zamet.hr
7	19 Mar	A	Crikvenica	32:27	GSD Crikvenica	rk-zamet.hr
8	30 Mar	H	Đakovo	33:31	Dvorana Mladosti	rk-zamet.hr
9	2 Apr	A	Dubrava Zagreb	36:35	SD Dubrava	rk-zamet.hr
10	9 Apr	A	Zadar Eva	27:26	SD Zadar	rk-zamet.hr
11	13 Apr	A	Gorica	32:30	Dvorana SŠ	rk-zamet.hr
12	16 Apr	H	RK Split	33:27	Dvorana Mladosti	rk-zamet.hr
13	20 Apr	A	Ekol Ivančica	27:26	SDSŠ Ivanec	rk-zamet.hr
14	23 Apr	H	Crikvenica	24:21	Dvorana Mladosti	rk-zamet.hr
15	29 Apr	A	Karlovac	28:27	Dvorana Mladost	rk-zamet.hr
16	4 May	H	Varteks Di Caprio	30:23	Dvorana Mladosti	rk-zamet.hr
17	7 May	A	Đakovo	38:36	GD Đakovo	rk-zamet.hr
18	14 May	H	Dubrava Zagreb	25:26	Dvorana Mladosti	rk-zamet.hr

== Croatian Cup ==
=== Matches ===
Date	Phase of competition	Opponent	Score	Venue
12 Feb 2005	Round of 16	Gorica	32:33 (7m)	Dvorana Mladosti
