= 2006–07 RK Zamet season =

Zamet Rijeka
2006-07 season
- President: Petar Bracanović (until 7 Feb 2007); Zlatko Kolić (from 7 Feb 2007)
- Coach: Mladen Prskalo (until 7 Feb 2007); Drago Žiljak (from 7 Feb 2017)
- Venue: Dvorana Mladosti
- Dukat 1.HRL: 10th
- Croatian Cup: Quarter-final

The 2006–07 season was the 50th season in RK Zamet’s history. It is their 6th successive season in the Dukat 1.HRL, and 30th successive top tier season.

== First team squad ==
Goalkeeper

- 1 (Croatia) Damir Bobanović
- 12 (Croatia) Ivan Stevanović
- 16 (Croatia) Ivan Pešić

Wingers
RW

- 6 (Croatia) Dario Černeka
- 8 (Croatia) Ivan Vrkljan
- 13 (Croatia) Josip Crnić

LW

- 4 (Croatia) Mateo Hrvatin
- 14 (Croatia) Marko Erstić

Line players

- 2 (Croatia) Krunoslav Pipinić
- 18 (Croatia) Anđelo Žeravica
- 19 (Croatia) Marin Sakić

Back players
LB

- 5 (Croatia) Jakov Gojun
- 9 (Croatia) Ivan Ćosić
- 10 (Croatia) Robert Savković
- 18 (Croatia) Nikola Kosanović

CB

- 6 (Croatia) Marijan Bašić
- 17 (Croatia) Igor Marijanović

RB

- 3 (Croatia) Vedran Banić
- 7 (Croatia) Milan Uzelac (captain)
- 11 (Bosnia and Herzegovina) Aleksandar Škorić
- 19 (Croatia) Luka Bracanovic
- 21 (Croatia) Vladimir Grujičić

=== Technical staff ===
- (Croatia) President: Petar Bracanović (until 7 Feb 2007)
- (Croatia) President: Zlatko Kolić (from 7 Feb 2007)
- (Croatia) Sports director: Damir Bogdanović (until Jan 2007)
- (Croatia) Sports director: Alvaro Načinović (from Jan 2007)
- (Croatia) Club Secretary: Daniela Juriša
- (Croatia) Head Coach: Mladen Prskalo (until 7 Feb 2007)
- (Croatia) Head Coach: Drago Žiljak (from 7 Feb 2007)
- (Croatia) Assistant Coach: Marin Mišković (from 24 Feb 2007)
- (Croatia) Fitness Coach: Emil Baltić
- (Croatia) Fizioterapist: Branimir Maričević
- (Croatia) Tehniko: Williams Černeka

== Competitions ==
=== Overall ===
Competition	First match	Last match	Starting round	Final position	Record							
Competition	First match	Last match	Starting round	Final position	G	W	D	L	GF	GA	GD	Win %
Dukat 1.HRL - Regular season	2 September 2006	8 December 2006	Matchday 1	7th	14	4	2	8	389	383	+6	28.57
Dukat 1.HRL - Play-offs	24 February 2006	26 May 2006	Matchday 1	10th	12	6	0	6	289	274	+15	50.00
Croatian Cup	17 February 2006	15 March 2006	Round of 16	Quarter-final	2	1	0	1	43	48	−5	50.00
Total					30	11	4	15	721	705	+16	36.67

== Dukat 1.HRL ==
=== Group B League table ===
Pos.	Team	Pld.	W	D	L	Goal+	Goal-	+/-	Pts.
1.	Perutnina PIPO IPC Čakovec	14	11	1	2	494	430	+64	23
2.	Moslavina Kutina	14	8	1	5	443	439	+4	17
3.	NEXE Našice	14	7	1	6	416	423	-7	15
4.	Agram Medveščak Zagreb	14	7	0	7	473	432	+42	14
5.	Dubrava Zagreb	14	6	1	7	405	425	-20	13
6.	Metković	14	5	2	7	390	407	-17	12
7.	Zamet Rijeka	14	4	2	8	389	383	+6	10
8.	Đakovo	14	4	0	10	372	448	-76	8

Source: Rk-zamet.hr

=== Matches ===
Round	Date	H/A	Opponent	Score	Venue	Report
1	2 Sep	H	Agram Medveščak Zagreb	27:22	Dvorana Mladosti	Sportnet.rtl.hr
2	9 Sep	A	Metković	24:23	SD Metković	Sportnet.rtl.hr
3	16 Sep	H	NEXE Našice	34:28	Dvorana Mladosti	Sportnet.rtl.hr
4	22 Sep	H	Perutnina PIPO IPC Čakovec	29:30	Dvorana Mladosti	Sportnet.rtl.hr
5	30 Sep	A	Moslavina Kutina	28:26	SC Kutina	Sportnet.rtl.hr
6	6 Oct	H	Dubrava Zagreb	28:26	Dvorana Mladosti	Sportnet.rtl.hr
7	14 Oct	A	Đakovo	30:29	GD Đakovo	Sportnet.rtl.hr
8	21 Oct	A	Agram Medveščak Zagreb	35:25	Dom Sportova	Sportnet.rtl.hr
9	2 Nov	H	Metković	23:23	Dvorana Mladosti	Sportnet.rtl.hr
10	11 Nov	A	NEXE Našice	33:29	SD Kralja Tomislava	Rk-zamet.hr
11	17 Nov	A	Perutnina PIPO IPC Čakovec	33:31	Dvorana GŠ	Rk-zamet.hr
12	25 Nov	H	Moslavina Kutina	23:23	Dvorana Mladosti	Sportnet.rtl.hr
13	3 Dec	A	Dubrava Zagreb	28:27	SD Dubrava	Rk-zamet.hr
14	8 Dec	H	Đakovo	35:20	Dvorana Mladosti	Rk-zamet.hr

=== League 12 table ===
Pos.	Team	Pld.	W	D	L	Goal+	Goal-	+/-	Pts.	Place
1.	Poreč	22	14	2	6	713	647	66	30	5th
2.	Agram Medveščak Zagreb	22	13	0	9	694	633	+61	26	6th
3.	NEXE Našice	22	11	2	9	661	667	-6	+24	7th
4.	Koteks Split	22	9	4	9	590	590	0	+22	8th
5.	Metković	22	10	2	10	597	600	-3	22	9th
6.	Zamet Rijeka	22	10	1	11	569	543	+26	21	10th
7.	Karlovac	22	9	3	10	539	551	-22	21	11th
8.	Varteks Di Caprio	22	9	2	11	634	642	-8	20	12th
9.	Dubrava Zagreb	22	10	1	11	595	613	-18	20 (-1)	13th
10.	Gorica	22	10	0	12	626	642	-16	20	14th
11.	Crikvenica	22	9	1	12	619	660	-41	19	15th
12.	Đakovo	22	9	0	13	597	642	-45	18	16th

Source: Rk-zamet.hr

=== Matches ===
Round	Date	H/A	Opponent	Score	Venue	Report
1	24 Feb	A	Varteks Di Caprio	25:20	ŠD Varaždin	Sportnet.rtl.hr
2	3 Mar	H	Gorica	23:17	Dvorana Mladosti	Sportnet.rtl.hr
3	10 Mar	A	Poreč	28:21	SRC Veli Jože	Sportnet.rtl.hr
4	17 Mar	H	Crikvenica	22:20	Dvorana Mladosti	Rk-zamet.hr
5	24 Mar	A	Karlovac	21:19	SŠD Mladost	Rk-zamet.hr
6	11 Apr	H	Koteks Split	27:18	Dvorana Mladosti	Rk-zamet.hr
7	14 Apr	H	Varteks Di Caprio	30:26	Dvorana Mladosti	Rk-zamet.hr
8	22 Apr	A	Gorica	26:23	Dvorana SŠ	Rk-zamet.hr
9	28 Apr	H	Poreč	29:26	Dvorana Mladosti	Rk-zamet.hr
10	12 May	A	Crikvenica	26:25	GSD Crikvenica	Rk-zamet.hr
11	19 May	H	Karlovac	33:15	Dvorana Mladosti	Rk-zamet.hr
12	26 May	A	Koteks Split	26:17	Arena Gripe	Rk-zamet.hr

== Croatian Cup ==
=== Matches ===
Date	Phase of competition	Opponent	Score	Venue
17 Feb 2007	Round of 16	Bjelovar	20:24	ŠSD Bjelovar
15 Mar 2007	Quarter-final	Karlovac	28:19	SŠD Mladost

== Sources ==
- HRS
- Sport.net.hr
- Rk-zamet.hr
