= 2001–02 RK Zamet season =

Zamet Crotek
2001–02 season
- President: Miljenko Mišljenović
- Coach: Damir Čavlović
- Venue: Dvorana Mladosti
- 1.HRL: 4th
- Croatian Cup: Semi final
- EHF Cup Winners' Cup: Round 4
- Average home league attendance: 1,000

The 2001–02 season was the 45th season in RK Zamet’s history. It is their 1st successive season in the 1.HRL, and 25th successive top tier season.

== First team squad ==
Goalkeeper

- 1 (Croatia) Ivan Stevanović
- 12 (North Macedonia) Petar Misovski
- 16 (Croatia) Igor Saršon

Wingers
RW

- 3 (Croatia) Tadej Široka
- 8 (Croatia) Boris Batinić

LW

- 4 (Croatia) Mateo Hrvatin
- 15 (Croatia) Janko Mavrović
- 20 (Croatia) Marko Erstić

Line players

- 2 (Croatia) Damir Bogdanović
- 6 (Croatia) Dalibor Zupčić
- 11 (Croatia) Mirjan Horvat
- 21 (Croatia) Kristijan Ljubanović

Back players
LB

- 5 (Croatia) Borna Franić (captain)
- 9 (Croatia) Tomislav Matošević
- 10 (Croatia) Robert Savković

CB

- 11 (Croatia) Tomislav Mesarov
- 18 (Croatia) Branko Radović
- 19 (Croatia) Egon Paljar

RB

- 5 (Croatia) Davor Šunjić
- 7 (Croatia) Milan Uzelac (injured since October)
- 7 (Croatia) Ivan Marenčić
- 13 (Croatia) Mario Barić

=== Technical staff ===
- (Croatia) President: Miljenko Mišljenović
- (Croatia) Sports director: Damir Bogdanović
- (Bosnia and Herzegovina) Technical director: Boris Konjuh
- (Bosnia and Herzegovina) Marketing director: Boris Konjuh
- (Croatia) Club Secretary: Senka Glušević
- (Croatia) Head Coach: Damir Čavlović
- (Croatia) Assistant Coach: Sergio DePrivitellio
- (Croatia) Fizioterapist: Marinko Anić
- (Croatia) Tehniko: Marin Miculinić

== Competitions ==
=== Overall ===
Competition	First match	Last match	Starting round	Final position	Record							
Competition	First match	Last match	Starting round	Final position	G	W	D	L	GF	GA	GD	Win %
1.HRL	29 September 2001	18 May 2002	Matchday 1	5th	30	17	1	12	801	754	+47	56.67
Croatian Cup	7 February 2002	11 May 2002	Round of 16	Semi-final	5	4	0	1	168	114	+54	80.00
EHF Cup Winners' Cup	9 November 2001	16 December 2001	Round 3	Round 4	4	1	0	3	100	103	−3	25.00
Total					39	22	1	16	1,069	971	+98	56.41

== EHF Cup Winners' Cup ==
=== Matches ===
9 November 2001 Round 3	Zamet Crotek Rijeka (Croatia)	31:34	(Lithuania) Siauliai Universitetas	Rijeka, Croatia
18:00 CEST (UTC+02:00)		Report		Stadium: Dvorana Mladosti; Attendance: 150; Referee: Viktor Oláh & Peter Szelecz (Hungary)

11 November 2001 Round 3	Siauliai Universitetas (Lithuania)	21:32	(Croatia) Zamet Crotek Rijeka	Rijeka, Croatia
11:00 CEST (UTC+02:00)		Report		Stadium: Dvorana Mladosti; Attendance: 280; Referee: Igor Karlubik & Slavomir Struhar (Slovakia)

8 December 2001 Round 4	Zamet Crotek Rijeka (Croatia)	23:24	(France) Montpellier Hb	Rijeka, Croatia
18:00 CEST (UTC+02:00)		Report		Stadium: Dvorana Mladosti; Attendance: 1,500; Referee: Ihar Yudchyts & Siarhei Kot (Belarus)

16 December 2001 Round 4	Montpellier Hb (France)	24:14	(Croatia) Zamet Crotek Rijeka	Montpellier, France
17:00 CEST (UTC+02:00)		Report		Stadium: Palais des sports René-Bougnol; Attendance: 2,700; Referee: Fernando Bernardes & Dario Ramos (Portugal)

== 1. HRL ==
=== League table ===
	Club	P	W	D	L	G+	G−	Dif	Pts
1.	Zagreb	30	29	0	1	960	735	+225	58
2.	Metković Jambo	30	29	0	1	968	642	+306	52 (-6)
3.	Medveščak Infosistem Zagreb	30	17	3	10	840	811	+29	37
4.	Zamet Crotek Rijeka	30	17	1	12	801	757	+44	35
5.	Umag	30	16	1	13	778	810	-32	33
6.	Varteks di Caprio Varaždin	30	15	2	13	754	742	+12	32
7.	Brodomerkur Split	30	14	2	14	805	794	+11	30
8.	Moslavina Kutina	30	13	2	15	835	837	+2	28
9.	Đakovo	30	13	1	16	724	821	-97	27
10.	Crikvenica	30	12	0	18	709	756	-47	24
11.	Perutnina PIPO IPC Čakovec	30	10	3	17	778	861	-83	23
12.	Ekol Ivančica Ivanec	30	9	3	18	739	838	-99	21
13.	Bjelovar	30	9	2	19	722	766	-44	20
14.	Dubrava Zagreb	30	9	1	20	736	837	-101	19
15.	Karlovac	30	9	0	21	743	801	-58	18
16.	Arena Pula	30	8	1	21	733	817	-84	17

=== Matches ===
Round	Date	H/A	Opponent	Score	Venue	Report
1	29 Sep	H	Metković Jambo	28:29	Dvorana Mladosti	sport.hrt.hr
2	4 Oct	A	Zagreb	29:25	Kutija Šibica	sport.hrt.hr
3	6 Oct	H	Brodokumer Split	21:21	Dvorana Mladosti	sport.hrt.hr
4	11 Oct	A	Varteks Di Caprio	20:33	ŠD Graberje	sport.hrt.hr
5	13 Oct	H	Crikvenica	26:21	Dvorana Mladosti	sport.hrt.hr
6	21 Oct	A	Ekol Ivančica	22:21	DSŠ Ivanec	sport.hrt.hr
7	24 Oct	H	Perutnina PIPO IPC	28:19	Dvorana Mladosti	sport.hrt.hr
8	11 Nov	H	Karlovac	26:22	Dvorana Mladosti	sport.hrt.hr
9	17 Nov	A	Dubrava Zagreb	27:21	SD Dubrava	sport.hrt.hr
10	25 Nov	H	Bjelovar	29:25	Dvorana Mladosti	sport.hrt.hr
11	29 Nov	A	Medveščak Infosistem	28:29	Dom Sportova	sport.hrt.hr
12	2 Dec	H	Umag	33:25	Dvorana Mladosti	sport.hrt.hr
13	9 Dec	A	Đakovo	0:10	GD Đakovo	sport.hrt.hr
14	16 Dec	H	Arena Pula	29:20	Dvorana Mladosti	sport.hrt.hr
15	22 Dec	A	Moslavina Kutina	28:31	ŠC Kutina	sport.hrt.hr
16	16 Feb	A	Metković Jambo	30:20	SD Metković	sport.hrt.hr
17	24 Feb	H	Zagreb	27:30	Dvorana Mladosti	sport.hrt.hr
18	2 Mar	A	Brodokumer Split	27:23	Arena Gripe	sport.hrt.hr
19	9 Mar	H	Varteks Di Caprio	26:22	Dvorana Mladosti	sport.hrt.hr
20	16 Mar	A	Crikvenica	22:27	Dvorana Dinko Lukarić	sport.hrt.hr
21	23 Mar	H	Ekol Ivančica	27:24	Dvorana Mladosti	sport.hrt.hr
22	30 Mar	A	Perutnina PIPO IPC	33:28	Dvorana GŠ	sport.hrt.hr
23	7 Apr	A	Karlovac	30:24	Dvorana Mladost	sport.hrt.hr
24	14 Apr	H	Dubrava	32:29	Dvorana Mladosti	sport.hrt.hr
25	17 Apr	A	Bjelovar	25:31	ŠSD Bjelovar	sport.hrt.hr
26	21 Apr	H	Medveščak Infosistem	25:31	Dvorana Mladosti	sport.hrt.hr
27	27 Apr	A	Umag	27:26	Stella Maris	sport.hrt.hr
28	12 May	H	Đakovo	39:29	Dvorana Mladosti	sport.hrt.hr
29	15 May	A	Arena Pula	26:30	Mate Parlov Sport Centre	sport.hrt.hr
30	18 May	H	Moslavina Kutina	35:28	Dvorana Mladosti	sport.hrt.hr

== Croatian Cup ==
=== Matches ===
Date	Phase of competition	Opponent	Score	Venue
7 Feb 2002	Round of 16	Trogir Alpro ATT	21:42	SD Trogir
12 Feb 2002	Round of 16	Trogir Alpro ATT	46:21:	Dvorana Mladosti
12 Mar 2002	Quarter final	Đakovo	23:28	GD Đakovo
27 Mar 2002	Quarter final	Đakovo	30:22	Dvorana Mladosti
11 May 2002	Semi final	Metković Jambo	27:22	SD Metković

== Friendly matches ==
=== Mid-season ===
18 January 2002 Friendly match	Croatia	44:32	Zamet Crotek Rijeka	Rovinj, Croatia
17:00 CEST (UTC+02:00)		Report		Stadium: Dvorana Val-bruna
