= 2000–01 RK Zamet season =

Zamet Crotek
2000–01 season
- President: Marko Markanović
- Coach: Damir Čavlović
- Venue: Dvorana Mladosti
- 1.A HRL: 4th
- Croatian Cup: Final
- EHF Cup Winners' Cup: Round 4
- Average home league attendance: 1,000

The 2000-01 season was the 44th season in RK Zamet’s history. It is their 9th successive season in the 1. A HRL, and 24th successive top tier season.

== First team squad ==
Goalkeeper

- 1 (Croatia) Ivan Stevanović
- 12 (Croatia) Mario Perčin
- 16 (Croatia) Igor Saršon
- 20 (Croatia) Vedran Šimunović

Wingers
RW

- 2 (Croatia) Mario Jozak
- 11 (Croatia) Igor Rožman

LW

- 4 (Croatia) Mateo Hrvatin
- 6 (Croatia) Eduard Hibšer
- 10 (Croatia) Bojan Pezelj

Line players

- 3 (Croatia) Renato Sulić
- 11 (Croatia) Mirjan Horvat
- 19 (Croatia) Adnan Kamberović

Back players
LB

- 10 (Croatia) Andrej Jurić
- 14 (Croatia) Tomislav Matošević
- 15 (Croatia) Borna Franić (captain)

CB

- 8 (Croatia) Igor Gmaz
- 13 (Bosnia and Herzegovina) Edin Bašić
- 17 (Croatia) Siniša Gaković
- 18 (Croatia) Ivica Grga

RB

- 5 (Croatia) Davor Šunjić
- 7 (Croatia) Milan Uzelac
- 9 (Croatia) Ivan Vukas

=== Technical staff ===
- (Croatia) President: Marko Markanović
- (Croatia) Sports director: Boris Konjuh
- (Croatia) Club Secretary: Senka Glušević
- (Croatia) Head Coach: Damir Čavlović
- (Croatia) Fitness Coach: Sergio DePrivitellio
- (Croatia) Fizioterapist: Alen Ilić
- (Croatia) Tehniko: Goran Segarić

== Competitions ==
=== Overall ===
Competition	First match	Last match	Starting round	Final position	Record							
Competition	First match	Last match	Starting round	Final position	G	W	D	L	GF	GA	GD	Win %
1.A HRL - Regular season	24 September 2000	22 April 2001	Matchday 1	4th	22	12	1	9	561	542	+19	54.55
1.A HRL - Play-offs	24 March 2018	2 June 2018	Matchday 1	Semi-final	2	0	0	2	53	63	−10	0.00
Croatian Cup	6 February 2001	6 May 2001	Round of 16	Final	6	4	1	1	166	141	+25	66.67
EHF Cup Winners' Cup	11 November 2000	17 December 2000	Round 3	Round 4	4	2	0	2	82	84	−2	50.00
Total					34	18	2	14	862	830	+32	52.94

== EHF Cup Winners' Cup ==
=== Matches ===
11 November 2000 Round 3	HC Tongeren (Belgium)	15:16	(Croatia) Zamet Crotek Rijeka	Tongeren, Belgium
20:30 CEST (UTC+02:00)		Report		Stadium: Eburons Dome; Attendance: 400; Referee: Krzysztof Manys & Marek Majka (Poland)

12 November 2000 Round 3	Zamet Crotek Rijeka (Croatia)	25:16	(Belgium) HC Tongeren	Tongeren, Belgium
15:00 CEST (UTC+02:00)		Report		Stadium: Eburons Dome; Attendance: 400; Referee: Krzysztof Manys & Marek Majka (Poland)

10 December 2000 Round 4	Zamet Crotek Rijeka (Croatia)	20:21	(Portugal) F.C. do Porto	Rijeka, Croatia
18:00 CEST (UTC+02:00)		Report		Stadium: Dvorana Mladosti; Attendance: 2,000; Referee: Vahit Ersan & Faruk Akman (Turkey)

17 December 2000 Round 4	F.C. do Porto (Portugal)	32:21	(Croatia) Zamet Crotek Rijeka	Porto, Portugal
16:30 CEST (UTC+02:00)		Report		Stadium: Pavilhão Desportivo Municipal de Sto. Tirso; Attendance: 700; Referee: Bernd Rosskamp & Freddy Rothkranz (Belgium)

== 1.A HRL ==
=== League table ===
	Club	P	W	D	L	G+	G−	Dif	Pts	Qualification
1.	Badel 1862 Zagreb	22	20	1	1	754	514	+240	41	Championship play-offs
2.	Metković Jambo	22	20	1	1	652	500	+152	41	Championship play-offs
3.	Brodomerkur Split	22	15	3	4	596	512	+84	33	Championship play-offs
4.	Zamet Crotek Rijeka	22	12	1	9	561	542	+19	25	Championship play-offs
5.	Moslavina Kutina	22	10	3	9	565	584	-19	23	
6.	Đakovo	22	8	2	12	518	515	+3	18	
7.	Varteks di Caprio Varaždin	22	6	4	12	529	589	-60	16	
8.	PIPO IPC Čakovec	22	7	2	13	518	592	-74	16	
9.	Medveščak Osiguranje Zagreb	22	6	3	13	521	557	-36	15	
10.	Ekol Ivančica Ivanec	22	7	1	14	545	611	-66	15	
11.	Plomin Linija Rudar Labin	22	6	1	15	485	591	-106	12 (-1)	
12.	Karlovac	22	4	0	18	511	612	-101	8	

=== Matches ===
Round	Date	H/A	Opponent	Score	Venue	Report
1	24 Sep	A	Medveščak Osiguranje	23:26	Dom Sportova	sport.hrt.hr
2	27 Sep	H	Ekol Ivančica	28:22	Dvorana Mladosti	sport.hrt.hr
3	1 Oct	A	Badel 1862 Zagreb	33:22	Kutija Šibica	sport.hrt.hr
4	1 Oct	H	Moslavina Kutina	28:24	Dvorana Mladosti	sport.hrt.hr
5	8 Oct	A	Plomin Linija Rudar	22:20	SD Labin	sport.hrt.hr
6	14 Oct	A	Karlovac	23:21	Dvorana Mladost	sport.hrt.hr
7	22 Oct	H	Đakovo	28:19	Dvorana Mladosti	sport.hrt.hr
8	3 Nov	A	Varteks Di Caprio	28:29	ŠD Graberje	sport.hrt.hr
9	12 Nov	H	Brodokumer Split	31:23	Dvorana Mladosti	sport.hrt.hr
10	18 Nov	A	PIPO IPC	23:23	Dvorana GŠ	sport.hrt.hr
11	26 Nov	H	Metković Jambo	24:27	Dvorana Mladosti	sport.hrt.hr
12	3 Dec	H	Medveščak Osiguranje	33:29	Dvorana Mladosti	sport.hrt.hr
13	6 Dec	A	Ekol Ivančica	31:34	DSŠ Ivanec	sport.hrt.hr
14	10 Feb	H	Badel 1862 Zagreb	19:30	Dvorana Mladosti	sport.hrt.hr
15	16 Feb	A	Moslavina Kutina	25:24	ŠC Kutina	sport.hrt.hr
16	25 Feb	H	Plomin Linija Rudar	26:22	Dvorana Mladosti	sport.hrt.hr
17	9 Mar	H	Karlovac	28:25	Dvorana Mladosti	sport.hrt.hr
18	17 Mar	A	Đakovo	23:19	GD Đakovo	sport.hrt.hr
19	24 Mar	H	Varteks Di Caprio	26:16	Dvorana Mladosti	sport.hrt.hr
20	7 Apr	A	Brodokumer Split	22:20	Arena Gripe	sport.hrt.hr
21	13 Apr	H	PIPO IPC	33:21	Dvorana Mladosti	sport.hrt.hr
22	22 Apr	A	Metković Jambo	31:19	SD Metković	sport.hrt.hr

=== Championship play-offs ===
Round	Date	H/A	Opponent	Score	Venue	Report
Semi-final	10 May	H	Badel 1862 Zagreb	25:31	Dvorana Mladosti	sport.hrt.hr
Semi-final	13 May	A	Badel 1862 Zagreb	32:28	Kutija Šibica	sport.hrt.hr

== Croatian Cup ==
=== Matches ===
Date	Phase of competition	Opponent	Score	Venue
6 Feb 2001	Round of 16	Moslavina Kutina	37:23	Dvorana Mladosti
14 Feb 2001	Round of 16	Trogir Alpro ATT	19:24	ŠC Kutina
12 Mar 2001	Quarter final	Medveščak Osiguranje	24:24	Dom Sportova
28 Mar 2001	Quarter final	Medveščak Osiguranje	31:25	Dvorana Mladosti
5 May 2001	Semi final	Varteks Di Caprio	22:28	Dom Sportova
6 May 2001	Final	Metković Jambo	22:28	Dom Sportova
