= 2010–11 RK Zamet season =

Zamet Rijeka
2010–11 season
- President: Zlatko Kolić
- Coach: Alen Kurbanović
- Venue: Centar Zamet
- Dukat Premier League: 9th
- Croatian Cup: Round of 16
- Top goalscorer: Mateo Hrvatin (117)
- Highest home attendance: 1,000 vs (Croatia) CO Zagreb (3 April 2011 - Centar Zamet)
- Lowest home attendance: 150 vs (Croatia) Moslavina Kutina (26 March 2011 - Centar Zamet)
Home colours	Away colours

The 2010–11 season was the 54th season in RK Zamet’s history. It is their 3rd successive season in the Dukat Premier League, and 34th successive top tier season.

== First team squad ==
Goalkeeper

- 1 (Croatia) Marin Đurica
- 12 (Croatia) Ivan Stevanović
- 16 (Croatia) Dino Slavić
- 40 (Croatia) Luka Sorić

Wingers
RW

- 6 (Croatia) Dario Černeka
- 15 (Croatia) Igor Montanari - Knez

LW

- 2 (Croatia) Damir Vučko
- 4 (Croatia) Mateo Hrvatin

Line players

- 3 (Croatia) Marin Zubčić
- 7 (Croatia) Milan Uzelac (captain)
- 10 (Croatia) Krešimir Kozina

Back players
LB

- 5 (Croatia) Luka Tandara
- 8 (Croatia) Bojan Lončarić
- 17 (Switzerland) Patrick Čuturić

CB

- 9 (Croatia) Bruno Kozina
- 18 (Croatia) Matija Golik
- 19 (Croatia) Marin Sakić

RB

- 11 (Croatia) Marin Kružić
- 13 (Croatia) Luka Kovačević
- 20 (Croatia) Luka Bracanović

Source: rukometstat.com

=== Technical staff ===
- (Croatia) President: Zlatko Kolić
- (Croatia) Vice-president: Željko Jovanović
- (Croatia) Sports director: Aleksandar Čupić
- (Croatia) Head Coach: Alen Kurbanović
- (Croatia) Assistant Coach: Marin Mišković
- (Croatia) Goalkeeper Coach: Igor Dokmanović
- (Croatia) Fitness Coach: Branimir Maričević
- (Croatia) Tehniko: Williams Černeka

== Competitions ==
=== Overall ===
Competition	First match	Last match	Starting round	Final position	Record							
Competition	First match	Last match	Starting round	Final position	G	W	D	L	GF	GA	GD	Win %
Dukat Premier League	4 September 2010	28 May 2011	Matchday 1	9th	30	12	3	15	906	937	−31	40.00
Croatian Cup	1 December 2010	8 February 2011	Qualifying Round	Round of 16	2	1	0	1	62	63	−1	50.00
Total					32	13	3	16	968	1,000	−32	40.63

== Dukat Premier League ==
=== League table ===
Pos.	Team	Pld.	W	D	L	Goal+	Goal-	Pts.
1.	Croatia Osiguranje Zagreb	30	30	0	0	1055	713	60
2.	NEXE Našice	30	27	1	2	1018	825	55
3.	Bjelovar	30	19	1	10	848	840	39
4.	Siscia Sisak	30	16	2	12	844	781	34
5.	Dubrava Zagreb	30	16	0	14	831	826	32
6.	Gorica	30	14	3	13	913	877	31
7.	Poreč	30	14	3	13	846	869	31
8.	Karlovačka Banka	30	14	0	16	801	831	28
9.	Zamet	30	12	3	15	906	937	27
10.	Međimurje Čakovec	30	12	3	15	854	891	27
11.	Varteks Di Caprio	30	12	2	16	868	962	26
12.	Buzet	30	10	5	15	778	793	25
13.	Split	30	11	1	18	866	895	23
14.	Arena Jadrograd Pula	30	10	0	20	863	977	20
15.	Medveščak NFD Zagreb	30	6	3	21	796	866	15
16.	Moslavina Kutina	30	3	1	26	770	974	7

Source: SportNet.hr

=== Matches ===
4 September 2010 1	Zamet	23:20	RK Arena Jadrograd	Rijeka
18:00 CEST		Report		Stadium: Centar Zamet; Attendance: 450; Referee: Josip Cepanec (Turčin) & Ranko Jeftc (Varaždin)

11 September 2010 2	Karlovačka Banka	23:20	Zamet	Karlovac
18:00 CEST		Report		Stadium: Dvorana Mladost; Attendance: 280; Referee: Dražen Gladović & Goran Volenik (Virovitica)

18 September 2010 3	Zamet	36:30	Medveščak NFD Zagreb	Rijeka
18:00 CEST		Report		Stadium: Centar Zamet; Attendance: 300; Referee: Robert Kober (Zagreb) & Igor Sunajko (Dugo Selo)

25 September 2010 4	Gorica	30:32	Zamet	Velika Gorica
17:30 CEST		Report		Stadium: Dvorana Srednjih Strukovnih Škola; Attendance: 150; Referee: Dražen Gladović & Goran Volenik (Virovitica)

29 September 2010 5	Zamet	21:22	Buzet	Rijeka
19:00 CEST		Report		Stadium: Centar Zamet; Attendance: 400; Referee: Dalibor Jurinović (Zadar) & Marko Mrvica (Biograd na Moru)

9 October 2010 6	Zamet	28:29	Dubrava Zagreb	Rijeka
18:00 CEST		Report		Stadium: Centar Zamet; Attendance: 250; Referee: Ivan Klapež & Ivan Pervan (Trilj)

16 October 2010 7	Moslavina Kutina	22:25	Zamet	Kutina
18:00 CEST		Report		Stadium: SC Kutina; Attendance: 250; Referee: Matija Gubica & Boris Milošević (Osijek)

23 October 2010 8	Zamet	33:26	Varteks Di Caprio	Rijeka
18:00 CEST		Report		Stadium: Centar Zamet; Attendance: 200; Referee: Igor Barle & Saša Vucić (Zagreb)

6 November 2010 9	Croatia Osiguranje Zagreb	42:26	Zamet	Zagreb
18:00 CEST		Report		Stadium: Kutija Šibica; Attendance: 300; Referee: Ivica Glavinić & Mile Veraja (Metković)

13 November 2010 10	Zamet	31:31	Međimurje Čakovec	Rijeka
18:00 CEST		Report		Stadium: Centar Zamet; Attendance: 350; Referee: Matija Gubica & Boris Milošević (Osijek)

16 November 2010 11	NEXE Našice	46:26	Zamet	Našice
19:00 CEST		Report		Stadium: SD Kralj Tomislav; Attendance: 300; Referee: Dražen Gladović & Goran Volenik (Virovitica)

27 November 2010 12	Zamet	33:28	Siscia Sisak	Rijeka
19:00 CEST		Report		Stadium: Centar Zamet; Attendance: 500; Referee: Matija Gubica & Boris Milošević (Osijek)

4 December 2010 13	Bjelovar	27:28	Zamet	Bjelovar
19:00 CEST		Report		Stadium: ŠSD Bjelovar; Attendance: 250; Referee: Robert Kober (Zagreb) & Igor Sunajko (Dugo Selo)

4 December 2010 14	Zamet	36:28	Poreč	Rijeka
18:00 CEST		Report		Stadium: Centar Zamet; Attendance: 400; Referee: Josip Cepanec (Turčin) & Ranko Jeftić (Varaždin)

11 December 2010 15	Split	36:28	Zamet	Split
18:00 CEST		Report		Stadium: SC Gripe; Attendance: 100

5 February 2011 16	RK Arena Jadrograd	34:29	Zamet	Pula
18:00 CEST		Report		Stadium: Dom Sportova Mate Parlov; Attendance: 200; Referee: Matija Gubica & Boris Milošević (Osijek)

12 February 2011 17	Zamet	33:24	Karlovačka Banka	Rijeka
18:00 CEST		Report		Stadium: Centar Zamet; Attendance: 400; Referee: Robert Kober (Zagreb) & Igor Sunajko (Dugo Selo)

19 February 2011 18	Medveščak NFD Zagreb	27:27	Zamet	Zagreb
17:30 CEST		Report		Stadium: Dom Sportova; Attendance: 400; Referee: Josip Cepanec (Turčin) & Ranko Jeftić (Varaždin)

27 February 2011 19	Zamet	35:36	Gorica	Rijeka
18:00 CEST		Report		Stadium: Centar Zamet; Attendance: 400; Referee: Dražen Gladović & Goran Volenik (Virovitica)

5 March 2011 20	Buzet	29:27	Zamet	Buzet
19:00 CEST		Report		Stadium: SD Buzet; Attendance: 300; Referee: Dalibor Jurinović & Marko Mrvica (Zadar)

20 March 2011 21	Dubrava Zagreb	35:27	Zamet	Zagreb
18:00 CEST		Report		Stadium: SD Dubrava; Attendance: 300; Referee: Tomislav Cindrić & Robert Gonzurek (Osijek)

26 March 2011 22	Zamet	37:29	Moslavina Kutina	Rijeka
18:00 CEST		Report		Stadium: Centar Zamet; Attendance: 150; Referee: Ivan Klapež & Ivan Pervan (Trilj)

3 April 2011 23	Varteks Di Caprio	28:28	Zamet	Varaždin
18:00 CEST		Report		Stadium: GD Varaždin; Attendance: 150; Referee: Matija Gubica & Boris Milošević (Osijek)

3 April 2011 24	Zamet	31:38	Croatia Osiguranje Zagreb	Rijeka
18:00 CEST		Report		Stadium: Centar Zamet; Attendance: 1,000; Referee: Ante Pavić & Mate Torbarina (Zadar)

17 April 2011 25	Međimurje Čakovec	36:37	Zamet	Čakovec
17:30 CEST		Report		Stadium: Dvorana GOC; Attendance: 150; Referee: Robert Kober (Zagreb) & Igor Sunajko (Dugo Selo)

22 April 2011 26	Zamet	25:32	NEXE Našice	Rijeka
17:30 CEST		Report		Stadium: Centar Zamet; Attendance: 400; Referee: Igor Barle & Saša Vucić (Zagreb)

30 April 2011 27	Siscia Sisak	32:24	Zamet	Sisak
19:00 CEST		Report		Stadium: ŠD Brezovica; Attendance: 350; Referee: Robert Kober (Zagreb) & Igor Sunajko (Dugo Selo)

14 May 2011 28	Zamet	40:37	Bjelovar	Rijeka
20:15 CEST		Report		Stadium: Centar Zamet; Attendance: 500; Referee: Robert Kober (Zagreb) & Igor Sunajko (Dugo Selo)

22 May 2011 29	Poreč	35:34	Zamet	Rijeka
18:00 CEST		Report		Stadium: SRC Veli Jože; Attendance: 200; Referee: Matija Gubica & Boris Milošević (Osijek)

28 May 2011 30	Zamet	30:31	Split	Rijeka
18:00 CEST		Report		Stadium: SRC Veli Jože; Attendance: 250; Referee: Matija Gubica & Boris Milošević (Osijek)

== Croatian Cup ==
=== PGŽ Cup - Qualifiers ===
1 December 2010 Final	Zamet	31:25	Senj	Rijeka
18:00 CEST (UTC+02:00)		Report		Stadium: Centar Zamet; Attendance: 150

=== Matches ===
8 February 2011 1/8	NEXE Našice	38:31	Zamet	Našice
18:00 CEST (UTC+02:00)		Report		Stadium: SD Kralj Tomislav; Attendance: 800; Referee: Igor Barle & Saša Vučić (Zagreb)

== Friendlies ==
21 January 2011 Friendly match	Bosna BH Gas (Bosnia and Herzegovina)	36:28	(Croatia) Zamet	Poreč
18:00 CEST (UTC+02:00)		Report		Stadium: SRC Veli Jože; Attendance: 300; Referee: ?

== Sources ==
- HRS
- Sport.net.hr
