= 2019–20 RK Zamet season =

Zamet Rijeka
2019–20 season
- President: Vedran Devčić
- Coach: Valter Matošević
- Venue: Centar Zamet
- Paket 24 Premier League: TBD
- Croatian Cup: TBD
Home colours	Away colours

The 2018–19 season is the 63rd season in RK Zamet’s history. It is their 12th successive season in the Dukat Premier League, and 42nd successive top tier season.

== Team ==
=== Current squad ===
Goalkeeper

- 12 (Croatia) Marin Sorić
- 30 (Croatia) Tino Viskić

Wingers
RW

- 5 (Croatia) Martin Mozetić
- 17 (Croatia) Sandro Samardžić

LW

- 7 (Croatia) Luka Grgurević
- 10 (Croatia) Dario Jeličić (captain)
- 22 (Croatia) Marko Mrakovčić

Line players

- 4 (Croatia) Karlo Tadić
- 72 (Croatia) Jan Koler
- 90 (Croatia) Veron Načinović

Back players
LB

- (Croatia) Antionio Dizdar
- 11 (Croatia) Vanja Šehić
- 86 (Croatia) Matija Starčević

CB

- 4 (Croatia) Tony Zarev
- 9 (Croatia) Nikola Njegovan
- 13 (Croatia) Tin Tomljanović

RB

- (Croatia) Ivan Jurčević
- 88 (Croatia) Patrik Martinović

Source: Rukometstat.com

== Technical staff ==
- (Croatia) President: Vedran Devčić
- (Croatia) Sports director: Vedran Babić
- (Croatia) Head Coach: Valter Matošević
- (Croatia) Assistant coach: Sandro Gulja
- (Croatia) Fizioterapist: Dragan Marijanović
- (Croatia) Fitness coach: Milan Rončević
- (Croatia) Team Manager: Boris Konjuh

== Competitions ==
=== Overall ===
Competition	First match	Last match	Starting round	Final position	Record							
Competition	First match	Last match	Starting round	Final position	G	W	D	L	GF	GA	GD	Win %
Paket 24 Premier League - Regular season	21 September 2019		Matchday 1	10th	3	1	0	2	102	119	−17	33.33
Total					3	1	0	2	102	119	−17	33.33

Last updated: 6 October 2019

== Paket 24 Premier League ==
=== League table ===
Pos.	Team	Pld.	W	D	L	Goal+	Goal-	+/-	Pts.	Qualification or relegation
1.	Spačva Vinkovci	3	3	0	0	96	79	+17	6	Championship play-offs
2.	Dubrava Zagreb	3	2	1	0	96	84	+12	5	Championship play-offs
3.	Bjelovar	3	2	1	0	85	82	+3	5	Championship play-offs
4.	Poreč	3	1	1	1	87	87	0	3	Championship play-offs
5.	Gorica	3	1	1	1	80	81	-1	3	Relegation play-offs
6.	Umag	3	1	1	1	82	89	-7	3	Relegation play-offs
7.	Varaždin 1930	3	1	0	2	80	84	-4	2	Relegation play-offs
8.	Zamet Rijeka	3	1	0	2	78	88	-10	2	Relegation play-offs
9.	Dubrovnik	3	0	1	2	88	93	-5	1	Relegation play-offs
10.	Sesvete	3	0	0	3	87	92	-5	0	Relegation play-offs

Updated to match(es) played on 6 October 2019. Source: Premijer liga Rezultati.com

=== Matches ===
21 September 2019 1	Spačva Vinkovci	31:24	Zamet	Vinkovci
19:00 CEST		Report		Stadium: SD Bartol Kašić; Attendance: 200; Referee: Tomislav Cindrić & Robert Gonzurek (Osijek)

28 September 2019 2	Zamet	29:28	Sesvete	Rijeka
18:00 CEST		Report		Stadium: Centar Zamet; Attendance: 300; Referee: Marko Duspara & Hrvoje Rogić (Velika Gorica)

6 October 2019 3	Varaždin 1930	29:25	Zamet	Varaždin
19:00 CEST		Report		Stadium: Arena Varaždin; Attendance: 200

== Friendly matches ==
=== Pre-season matches ===
22 August 2019 Friendly	Zamet (Croatia)	32:25	(Austria) Atzgersdorf	Rijeka
20:00 CEST		Report		Stadium: Centar Zamet

23 August 2019 26. Memorial Jože Šilc	Sevnica (Slovenia)	18:28	(Croatia) Zamet	Ribnica
18:00 CEST		Report		Stadium: Ribnica Sports Center

23 August 2019 26. Memorial Jože Šilc	Riko Ribnica (Slovenia)	26:20	(Croatia) Zamet	Ribnica
20:00 CEST		Report		Stadium: Ribnica Sports Center

24 August 2019 26. Memorial Jože Šilc	Zamet (Croatia)	33:21	(Slovenia) Butan Plin Izola	Ribnica
20:00 CEST		Report		Stadium: Ribnica Sports Center

31 August 2019 Friendly	Zamet	34:32	Dubrava	Rijeka
14:00 CEST		Report		Stadium: Centar Zamet

7 September 2019 Crikvenica tournament	Zamet	28:24	Rudan Labin	Crikvenica
14:00 CEST		https://www.facebook.com/rkmornar.crikvenica.5/posts/533623634058719 Report]		Stadium: GSD Crikvenica

7 September 2019 Crikvenica tournament	Zamet	23:27	Bjelovar	Crikvenica
17:00 CEST		Report		Stadium: GSD Crikvenica

17 September 2019 Friendly	Zamet (Croatia)	26:30	(China) Beijing Sport University	Rijeka
18:30 CEST		Report		Stadium: Dvorana Mladosti

== Transfers ==
=== In ===
Date	Position	Player	From	To
22 June 2019	RW	(Croatia) Sandro Samardžić	(Croatia) RK Dubrava	Zamet
9 July 2019	RW	(Croatia) Vanja Šehić	(Croatia) Rudan Labin	Zamet
9 July 2019	LB	(Croatia) Tony Zarev	(Croatia) Mornar-Crikvenica	Zamet

=== Out ===
Date	Position	Player	From	To
13 June 2019	CB	(Croatia) Tin Lučin	(Croatia) Zamet	(Spain) Ademar León
11 August 2019	GK	(Croatia) Fran Lučin	(Croatia) Zamet	(Croatia) Umag
11 August 2019	RW	(Croatia) Filip Glavaš	(Croatia) Zamet	(Croatia) Umag

== Sources ==
- Hrs.hr
- Rk-zamet.hr
- SportCom.hr
- Sport.net.hr
- Rezultati.com
