= Mohorič =

Mohorič is a Slovene surname. Notable people with the surname include:

- Klemen Mohorič (born 1975), Slovenian professional ice hockey goaltender
- Matej Mohorič (born 1994), Slovenian road racing cyclist
- Matejka Mohorič (born 1978), Slovenian biathlete
- Tomislav Mohorić (1926–1990), Croatian swimmer and water polo player
