= Mladenko Mišković =

Croatian handball player (born 1942)

Personal information
- Nationality: Croatian
- Born: 18 February 1942 (age 84) Metković, Independent State of Croatia

Sport
- Sport: Handball

Senior clubs
- Years: Team
- 1956-1957: RK Partizan Sušak
- 1957-1963: RK Exportdrvo
- 1963-1972: RK Partizan Zamet

Teams managed
- 1965-1966: RK Partizan Zamet
- 1970-1979: RK Partizan Zamet
- 1987-1988: RK Zamet
- 1993: RK Zamet
- 1995: ŽRK Zamet

Mladenko Mišković (born 18 February 1942) is a former Croatian handball player.

== Sources ==
- Petar Orgulić - 50 godina rukometa u Rijeci (2005), Adria public
