= Valner Franković =

Croatian handball player (born 1968)

Personal information
- Nationality: Croatian
- Born: 9 May 1968 (age 58) Raša, SFR Yugoslavia

Sport
- Sport: Handball

Senior clubs
- Years: Team
- 1985–1986: Rudar Labin
- 1987–1993: Zamet
- (loan)1991: Gunzburg
- (loan) 1993: Rudar Labin
- 1993–1995: RK Badel 1862 Zagreb
- 1995–1998: Karlovačka Banka
- 1999–2000: Pallamano Modena
- 2000–2001: Rudar Labin
National team
Years	Team	
1988–1990	Yugoslavia U-21	
1991–1997	Croatia	24
Medal record
Men's handball
Representing Yugoslavia U-21
Junior World Championship
Bronze medal – third place	1989 Spain	Team
Representing Croatia
Olympic Games
Gold medal – first place	1996 Atlanta	Team
Mediterranean Games
Gold medal – first place	1997 Bari	Team

Valner Franković (born 9 July 1968) is a Croatian former handball player.

Franković played for the younger selections of the Yugoslav national handball team. He played and won two Balkan Cups, 1988 Romania and 1989 Bulgaria as well as a bronze medal at IHF Men's Junior World Championship in 1989.

He played for the Croatia national handball team at the 1996 Summer Olympics in Atlanta, where Croatia won the gold medal.

== Honours ==
Zamet

- Yugoslav Second League (1): 1986–87
- Croatian Championship U-21 (1): 1990
- Croatian A First League Runner-up (1): 1991–92

Rudar Labin

- Croatian First B League – South (1): 1992–93

Badel 1862 Zagreb

- Croatian A First League (2): 1993–94, 1994–95
- Croatian Cup (2): 1994, 1995
- EHF Champions League Finalist (1): 1994–95

Karlovačka Banka

- Croatian A First League Runner-up (1): 1995–96
- Croatian Cup Finalist (1): 1997
