= Željko Milanović =

Croatian handball player and coach (born 1957)

Personal information
- Full name: Željko Milanović
- Nationality: Croatian
- Born: 19 May 1957 (age 69) Rijeka, SFR Yugoslavia

Sport
- Sport: Handball
- Position: Right back
- Current club: Retired
- Number: 5

Youth career
- Years: Team
- 1970–1974: RK Partizan Zamet

Senior clubs
- Years: Team
- 1974–1984: RK Zamet

Teams managed
- 1985–1987: RK Zamet (Youth)

Željko Milanović (born 19 May 1957) is a former Croatian handball player and coach. He is currently the secretary of Handball Association of Primorje-Gorski Kotar.

== Honours ==
Zamet

- Yugoslav Second League (1): 1977–78
- Yugoslav Third League (1): 1976–77
