= Darko Dunato =

Croatian handball player (born 1960)

Personal information
- Nationality: Croatian
- Born: 17 May 1960 (age 66) Rijeka, SFR Yugoslavia

Sport
- Sport: Handball
- Current club: Retired
- Number: 4

Youth career
- Years: Team
- 1970–1974: RK Kozala

Senior clubs
- Years: Team
- 1974–1979: RK Kozala
- 1979–1989: RK Zamet
- 1989–1991: HC Imola
- 1991–1992: RK Zamet
Title
1993–1995	Sports director	RK Zamet
1997–1999	Vice-president	ŽRK Zamet
2003–2004	Coaching staff	Croatia
2010–2016	President	HA-PGK

Teams managed
- 1992–1993: RK Zamet (assistant)
- 1993: RK Zamet
- 2001-2002: ŽRK Zamet
- 2011–2013: RK Kozala
- 2013–2015: RK Buzet

Darko Dunato (born 17 May 1960) is a former Croatian handball player.

== Honours ==
Zamet

- Croatian First A League: Vice-Champions (1): 1991–92
- Yugoslav Second League (1): 1986–87
