= Valter Marković =

Croatian handball player (born 1959)

Personal information
- Full name: Croatia
- Nationality: Croatian
- Born: 16 October 1959 (age 67) Labin, SFR Yugoslavia

Sport
- Sport: Handball
- Current club: Retired
- Number: 9

Youth career
- Years: Team
- 1973–1975: RK Zamet

Senior clubs
- Years: Team
- 1975–1987: RK Zamet
- 1987–1989: RK Matulji
- 1993–1995: RK Trsat

Teams managed
- 1995–1996: RK Trsat

Valter Marković (born 16 October 1959) is a former Croatian handball player.

== Honours ==
RK Zamet

- Yugoslav Third League (1): 1976–77
- Yugoslav Second League (2): 1977–78, 1986–87
