= Vedran Banić =

Croatian handball player (born 1983)

Personal information
- Nationality: Croatian
- Born: 1 August 1983 (age 43) Pula, SFR Yugoslavia
- Height: 192 m (630 ft)

Sport
- Sport: Handball
- Position: Right back
- Current club: Retired
- Number: 32

Senior clubs
- Years: Team
- 2000-2002: RK Arena Pula
- 2002-2007: RK Zamet
- 2007-2009: RK Poreč
- 2009-2010: RK Bosna BH Gas
- 2010-2012: A1 Bregenz Handball
- 2012-2017: TSV St. Otmar St. Gallen

Teams managed
- 2017-2018: TSV St. Otmar St. Gallen
- 2018-2019: HC Romanshorn
- 2019-: HC Arbon

Vedran Babić (born 1 August 1983) is a former Croatian team handball player is currently head coach of Swiss club HC Arbon.

== Honours ==
Bosna Sarajevo

- Handball Championship of Bosnia and Herzegovina (1): 2009–10
- Handball Cup of Bosnia and Herzegovina (1): 2010
