= Božidar Jović =

Croatian handball player (born 1972)

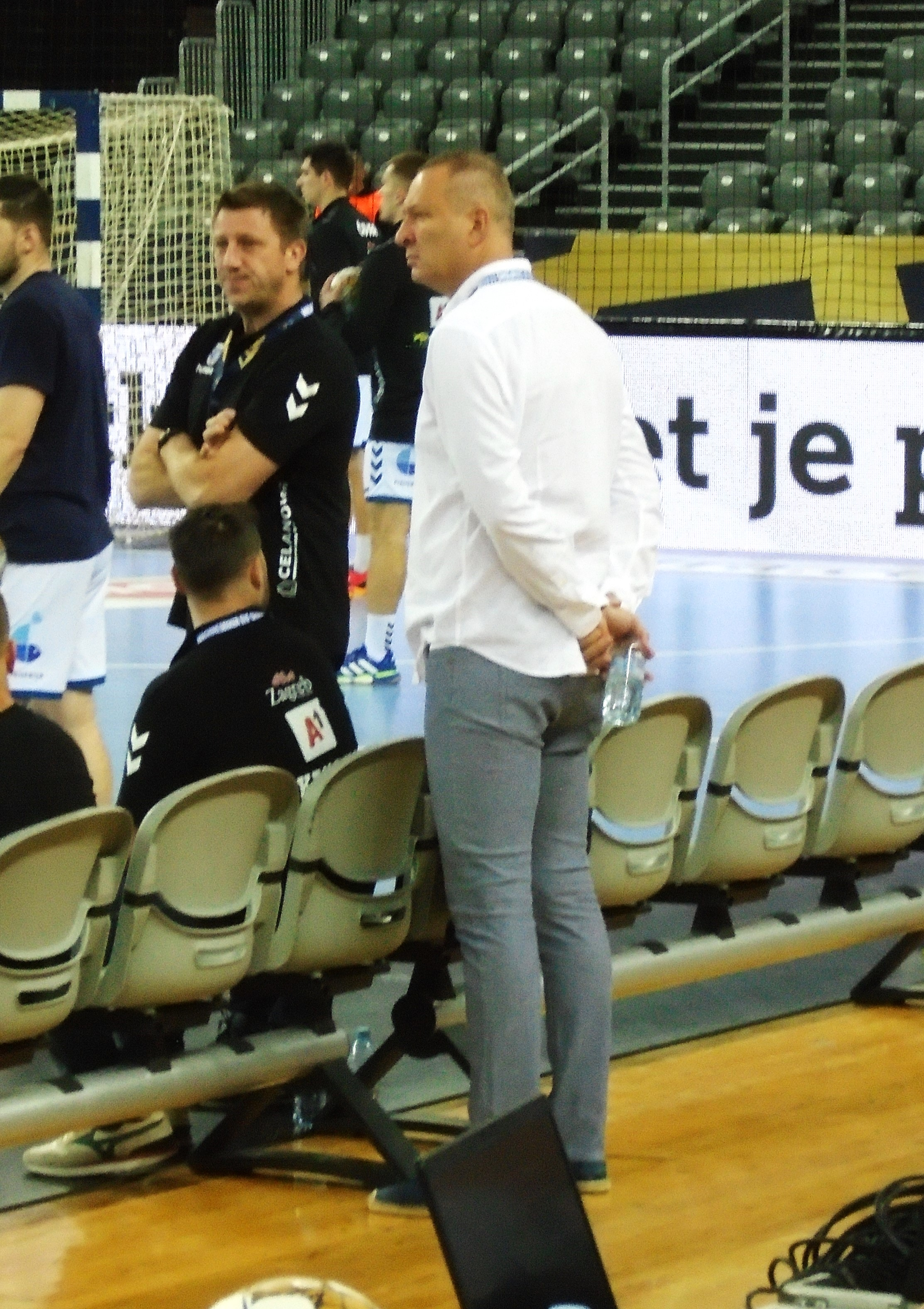
- Božidar Jović talking to Andrija Nikolić (left), the head coach, during the match RK Zagreb - Aalborg Håndbold (31:23) in Zagreb Arena sportshall, Croatia, on 18th September 2024

Personal information
- Nationality: Croatian
- Born: 13 February 1972 (age 54) Banja Luka, SFR Yugoslavia
- Height: 2.02 m (6 ft 8 in)

Sport
- Sport: Handball
- Position: Line player
- Current club: RK Zagreb (general manager)

Youth career
- Years: Team
- –: Borac Banja Luka

Senior clubs
- Years: Team
- 1989–1992: Borac Banja Luka
- 1992–2000: Badel 1862 Zagreb
- 2000–2003: Fotex Veszprém
- 2003–2004: Zamet Crotek
National team
Years	Team	Apps	(Gls)
1995–2003	Croatia	100	(100)
Medal record
Men's handball
Representing Croatia
Olympic Games
Gold medal – first place	1996 Atlanta	Team
World Championship
Silver medal – second place	1995 Iceland	Team
Gold medal – first place	2003 Portugal	Team
Mediterranean Games
Gold medal – first place	1997 Bari	Team
Gold medal – first place	2001 Tunis	Team

Božidar Jović (born 13 February 1972) is a retired Croatian handball player and current general manager of Zagreb Handball Club.

He played for the Croatia men's national handball team at the 1996 Summer Olympics in Atlanta, where Croatia won the gold medal. He also won a gold medal at the World Handball Championship held in Portugal in 2003.

== Honours ==
Borac Banja Luka

- EHF Cup (1): 1991
- Yugoslavian Cup (1) : 1992

RK Zagreb

- Croatian First League (8): 1992–93, 1993–94, 1994–95, 1995–96, 1996–97, 1997–98, 1998–99, 1999–00
- Croatian Cup (8): 1993, 1994, 1995, 1996, 1997, 1998, 1999, 2000
- European Champions Cup (1): 1992–93

Veszprém

- Hungarian First League (3): 2000–01, 2001–2002, 2002–2003
- Magyar Kupa (2): 2002, 2003

=== Orders ===
- Order of Danica Hrvatska with face of Franjo Bučar
