= Boris Dragičević =

Croatian handball player and coach (born 1958)

Personal information
- Full name: Boris Dragičević
- Nationality: Croatian
- Born: 10 September 1958 (age 68) Rijeka, SFR Yugoslavia

Sport
- Sport: Handball
- Position: Right back
- Current club: Retired
- Number: 9

Youth career
- Years: Team
- 1972-1974: RK Turnić

Senior clubs
- Years: Team
- 1974-1980: RK Turnić
- 1980-1991: RK Zamet
- 1992-1994: RK Zamet

Teams managed
- 1993-1996: RK Zamet II
- 1996-2001: RK Pećine
- 2001-2005: ŽRK Zamet
- 2005-2006: RK Zamet

Boris Dragičević (born 10 September 1958) is a former Croatian handball player and coach.

He played for RK Zamet for 13 years. He was part of the RK Zamet squad that were vice-champions in 1992.

== Honours ==
=== As player ===
RK Zamet

- Yugoslav Second League (1): 1986-87

=== As a coach ===
RK Zamet II

- Croatian Handball Championship U-19 (1): 1996
- Croatian Handball Championship U-18 :Third place (1): 1994
