= 1992 Croatian First A League =

First A League
- Season: 1992
- Champions: Zagreb Loto
- European Champions Cup: Zagreb Loto, Zamet Rijeka
- EHF Cup Winners' Cup: Coning Medveščak Zagreb
- IHF Cup: Bjelovar
- Matches played: 16

1992 Croatian First A League was the first season of First A League. It was the first season of Croatian handball to be played after their departure from the Yugoslav First League. The tournament started 21 March 1992. No teams were relegated during this season.

== First phase ==
| | Club | P | W | D | L | G+ | G− | Dif | Pts | |
|---|---|---|---|---|---|---|---|---|---|---|
| 1. | Zagreb Loto | 10 | 9 | 1 | 0 | 296 | 221 | 75 | 19 | Championship play-offs |
| 2. | Coning Medveščak Zagreb | 10 | 7 | 0 | 3 | 261 | 222 | 39 | 14 | Championship play-offs |
| 3. | Zamet Rijeka | 10 | 6 | 2 | 2 | 222 | 222 | 0 | 14 | Championship play-offs |
| 4. | Bjelovar | 10 | 2 | 1 | 7 | 220 | 260 | -40 | 5 | Championship play-offs |
| 5. | Istraturist Umag | 10 | 2 | 1 | 7 | 192 | 222 | -30 | 5 | |
| 6. | Moslavina Kutina | 10 | 1 | 1 | 8 | 191 | 235 | -44 | 3 | |

== Championship play-offs ==
| Club1 | Club2 | Score |
Semi-final
| Bjelovar | Zagreb Loto | 29:33, 25:34 |
| Zamet | Coning Medveščak | 22:22, 30:26 |
Final
| Zamet | Zagreb Loto | 22:22, 23:25 |
bold score - home match for Club1 normally written score - away match for Club1

== Final standings ==
| Gold medal | Zagreb Loto |
| Silver medal | Zamet Rijeka |
| Bronze medal | Coning Medveščak |
| 4 | Bjelovar |
| 5 | Istraturist Umag |
| 6 | Moslavina Kutina |

| Qualified for the 1992-93 European Champions Cup | Qualified for the 1992-93 EHF Cup Winners' Cup | Qualified for the 1992-93 IHF Cup |

1992 Croatian First A League winners

Zagreb Loto
First title

== Sources ==
- Fredi Kramer, Dražen Pinević: Hrvatski rukomet = Croatian handball, Zagreb, 2009.; page 178
- Petar Orgulić: 50 godina rukometa u Rijeci, Rijeka, 2004.; pages 217 and 218
- Kruno Sabolić: Hrvatski športski almanah 1992/1993, Zagreb, 1992.
