= Zvonimir Škerl =

Croatian handball player and soldier (1962-1992)

Personal information
- Full name: Zvonimir Škerl
- Nationality: Croatian
- Born: 30 June 1962 Rijeka, FPR Yugoslavia
- Died: 19 January 1992 (aged 29) Perušić, Croatia

Sport
- Sport: Handball
- Position: Line player

Youth career
- Years: Team
- 1977-1980: RK Trsat

Senior clubs
- Years: Team
- 1980–1991: RK Kozala

Zvonimir Škerl (June 30, 1962 – January 19, 1992) was a Croatian handball player and soldier during the Croatian War of Independence.

== Early life and career ==
Škerl grew up in the suburb of Trsat in Rijeka.

In his youth he played for RK Trsat for three years before moving to RK Kozala. He played his whole senior career at Kozala and was even the captain of the squad. He represented his club throughout various regional leagues.

== Military service and death ==
Once the Croatian War of Independence started Škerl enlisted in the Croatian Army.

He was part of the Croatian National Guard's 128th Infantry Brigade. Škerl was stationed in Perušić where Battle of Gospić was fought. On January 19 1992 artillery attacks where dispersed on Perušić and Škerl was one of the soldiers who lost his life.

== Tribute ==
Since January 1992 there has been a memorial handball tournament in honor of Škerl organized by his former club RK Kozala named Memorial Zvonimir Škerl. The tournament has featured a variety of selection: cadet, senior, veteran, that have played depending on the organization. The proceeds of the tournament go to the veterans of the 128th Infantry Brigade in Rijeka.

== Sources ==
- Petar Orgulić - 50 godina rukometa u Rijeci (Adria Public)
