= Mladen Prskalo =

Croatian handball player and coach (born 1968)

Personal information
- Nationality: Croatian
- Born: 16 June 1968 (age 58) Labin, SFR Yugoslavia
- Height: 1.92 m (6 ft 4 in)

Sport
- Sport: Handball
- Position: Pivot
- Number: 14

Youth career
- Years: Team
- –: RK Rudar Labin

Senior clubs
- Years: Team
- 1985-1987: Rudar Labin
- 1987-1992: Zamet
- 1992-1996: Vöslauer HC
- 1996-1999: Zamet Autotrans
- 1999-2001: Mladi Rudar
- 2001-2005: Crikvenica
- 2005-2006: Zamet
National team
| Years | Team | Apps |
| 1996-1997 | Croatia | 13 |

Teams managed
- 2006-2007: Zamet
- 2008-2009: Kvarner Kostrena
- 2009-2013: RK Goranin
- 2014-2019: ŽRK Murvica
- 2019-: Rudan Labin
Medal record
Men's handball
Representing Croatia
Mediterranean Games
| Gold medal – first place | 1997 Bari | Team |

Mladen Prskalo (born 16 June 1968) is a Croatian handball coach and former player who player at the line position. He is currently head coach of Rudan Labin from Labin.

He is the uncle of goalkeeper Andrej Prskalo.

== Career ==
Prskalo spent the majority of his career playing for Zamet, he also played for Rudar Labin, Mladi Rudar, Crikvenica and Austrian club Vöslauer HC.

As an international player he played for Croatia men's national handball team 13 times. He appeared at 1997 World Championship and 1997 Mediterranean Games where Croatia won a gold medal.

After retiring as a player from Zamet he became coach for half a season at the club. He was also a coach of RK Kvarner Kostrena for a season.

For three years he coached the RK Goranin youth team before coaching ŽRK Murvice from Crikvenica.

== Honours ==
=== Player ===
Rudar Labin

- Primorje and Istra Regional League (1): 1986-87

Zamet

- Croatian First A League Vice champions (1): 1992

Mladi Rudar

- Croatian First B League (1): 1999-2000

=== Coach ===
ŽRK Murvica

- Croatian Second League (1): 2017-18

Individual

- Vöslauer HC top goalscorer 1994-95 season - 78 goals
- Best senior team in Crikvenica - 2015
