= Tomislav Mohorić =

Croatian swimmer and water polo player

Personal information
- Nationality: Croatian
- Born: 27 September 1926 Sušak, Kingdom of Serbs, Croats and Slovenes
- Died: 28 January 1990 (aged 63)

Sport
- Sport: Handball

Youth career
- Years: Team
- –: VK Viktorija Sušak

Senior clubs
- Years: Team
- 1948-1956: VK Primorje
- 1954-1956: RK Primorje

Teams managed
- 1955-1958: ŽRK Primorje
- 1957-1963: RK Exportdrvo
- 1957-1961: ŽRK Exportdrvo
- 1962-1963: ŽRK Exportdrvo
- 1964-1965: RK Partizan Zamet

Tomislav Mohorić (September 27, 1926 – January 28, 1990) was a Croatian swimmer and water polo player. After ending his playing career he became a water polo and handball coach.

== Career ==
Mohorić played for VK Primorje and during his playing career the club was in always in the top five of the Yugoslav Water Polo Championship. He also played for the newly established handball team of Primorje. In 1956 he ended his playing career and started his coaching.

In 1958 Mohorić alongside Eduard Domazet and Dmitar Trbović founded the handball club Exportdrvo and Mohorić led the men's and women's senior team. His most biggest achievement was with the men's team when the club gained promotion to the Yugoslav Second League and finished in second in the league. During its time the club was the best handball club in Rijeka and a force to be reckoned with in Yugoslav handball. The club was disbanded in 1963.

During the 1960s and 1970s he was the tehniko of VK Primorje most notably to the team that was second in the LEN Cup Winners' Cup in 1976. Later during the 1980s he was a board member of VK Primorje.

== Honours ==
=== RK Primorje ===
- Rijeka League
  - Winner (1): 1955-56

=== ŽRK Primorje ===
- Rijeka League
  - Winner (1): 1956-57
- Croatian Championship
  - Fourth place (1): 1956-57

=== RK Exportdrvo ===
- Rijeka League
  - Winner (2): 1957-58, 1960–61
- Rijeka Zone League
  - Winner (1): 1962-63
- Yugoslav Second League (West)
  - Second place (1): 1961-62

=== ŽRK Exportdrvo ===
- Rijeka League
  - Winner (2): 1959-60, 1960–61
- Rijeka Zone League
  - Winner (1): 1962-63

== Sources ==
- Petar Orgulić - 50 godina rukometa u Rijeci (2005), Adria public
