= RK Zamet =

Handball club in Croatia

- Full name: Rukometni klub Zamet
- Founded: 1957
- Arena: Centar Zamet
- Capacity: 2,350
- President: Vedran Devčić
- Head coach: Mateo Hrvatin
- League: Croatian Premier League
- 2021–22: Croatian Premier League, 10th of 16
- Club colours
Home	Away

RK Zamet (Rukometni Klub Zamet) is a handball club from Rijeka, Croatia, formed in 1957. The club currently competes in the Croatian Premier Handball League and the Croatian Handball Cup. Although the club has not won any mayor trophies, it has produced four Olympic gold medalists: Valter Matošević, Alvaro Načinović, Valner Franković and Mirza Džomba. Four additional Olympic gold medalists played for the club, including Irfan Smajlagić, Vladimir Šujster, Zlatko Saračević and Božidar Jović, and Jakov Gojun, who has a bronze medal.

== History ==
=== Origins ===
The club was founded in September 1957, as RK Partizan Zamet by Prof. Stanko Jerger, Josip Šarić and Vittorio Drog. The players of the first RK Zamet team were Vilim Blažić, Tomislav Blažić, Nelo Stepčić, Vinko Radovčić, Anton Srdoč, Boris Kinkela, Josip Šarić and Stanko Jerger.

=== Zamet in Yugoslavia (1957–1991) ===
During the first ten years, real results came in 1966 when Zamet won the Regional League of Primorje and Karlovac. During the 1960s Zamet played at the regional level. In 1969 Zamet's U-14 team won the club's first youth trophy at the Croatian U-14 Championship.

Until 1972, the club played in the Regional League of Primorje and Istra (Primorska regionalna liga), in which they won the championship title in 1966, 1970, and 1972, along with three runner-up titles. In 1972, they started competing in the Third Yugoslav League. In 1977, they were promoted to the Second Yugoslav League and, the following year, Zamet gained promotion to the First Yugoslav League. This decade saw players such as Marijan Seđak, Williams Černeka, Valter Marković, Željko Milanović, Darko Srdoč, Damir Čavlović, Boris Komucki, Renato Sošić and Jurica Lakić who left their marks in Zamet and handball in general. Unfortunately they were relegated after one season in the first league, finishing 14th.

For two seasons the club was renamed Partizan Rijeka from 1977 to 1979, when it was changed to Zamet.

In 1981, Zamet beat long time city rivals RK Kvarner and became Rijeka's top handball club. During the early 1980s, Zamet played in the second division. In 1982 the administration of MRK Zamet (men's team) and ŽRK Zamet (women's team) split up and went their separate ways.

The 1980s saw one of the best generation of players come through the club, such as Darko Dunato, Boris Dragičević, Marin Mišković, Tonči Peribonio, Valter Periša, Vlado Vukoje, Alvaro Načinović, Valner Franković, Mladen Prskalo, Valter Matošević and Drago Žiljak.

In 1987, they once again earned promotion to the first division, where they stayed until the breakup of Yugoslavian league in 1991. Their best position in the league was in 1987–88 when they were 8th.

=== Zamet in Croatia (1991–2014) ===
Following the independence of Croatia, from 1992, Zamet competed in the top-tier league – Croatian First A League. Their first season in the newly founded league saw a prominent rise of power with them finishing second in the league and reaching the semi-finals of Croatian Cup.

The second place in the league earned Zamet a chance to qualify for their first European competition, in this case the European Champions Cup. Unfortunately Zamet lost in the first round to Pivovarna Laško Celje on aggregate due to one goal, winning the first match and losing the second.

With high expectations from the previous season, the 1992–93 season brought a big shock. Zamet finished 8th with coach Žiljak being replaced mid-season with Darko Dunato, who had retired as a player the previous season. Zamet were also eliminated from the Croatian Cup by Coning Medveščak Zagreb. The next season Žiljak returned as head coach but brought the same results as the season before. Zamet finished 8th.

In the 1994–95 season Zamet were relegated to the First B League, finishing 9th in the league with newly appointed coach Ivan Munitić. Zamet bounced back the next season, finishing first and gaining swift promotion back to the First A League. In this season a new generation of players emerged such as Mirza Džomba, Nikola Blažičko, Renato Sulić, Milan Uzelac, and Igor Saršon. The 1996–97 season saw Zamet in 5th place, a disappointing result due to the fact that they had players such as Valter Matošević and Irfan Smajlagić.

From 1997 to 2000 Zamet changed their name to Zamet Autotrans, due to a sponsorship deal. During this period, Zamet regularly finished near the top of the table. Ivan Munitić also took Zamet to the quarter-final of EHF City Cup and Round 16 of the EHF Cup Winners' Cup.

In 2000, Zamet signed a new sponsorship deal with Teri-Crotek, changing the club's name to Zamet Crotek for four years. They made it to the Croatian Handball Cup final, where they finished as runners-up in 2000 and 2001. With Damir Čavlović as head coach Zamet played Europe, each season making some of the best results the club saw.

After a successful period, poor results ensued, and during the late 2000s the club often finished in the middle or bottom half of the table. The club was also in financial trouble and often couldn't pay the players their salaries.

In 2011–12 Zamet got to the finals of the Croatian Cup where they lost to Croatia Osiguranje Zagreb. That same season through league results they qualified for the EHF Cup for the first time in ten years. They lost to HK ASA Meso Lovoseice in their first round on aggregate 59–56.

=== Recent years (2014–present) ===
On 23 April 2014 Vedran Devčić was appointed as the new president of Zamet. Vedran Babić was appointed as sports director; Damir Balenović, Marinko Blečić, Ivan Krešić, Miljenko Mrakovčić, Igor Načinović, Vjekoslav Sardelić, and Goran Stašek were appointed as board members; and Marin Mišković stayed on as head coach. Zamet had ended their 2013–14 season in 6th place.

Zamet played their 2014–15 season by finishing in 5th place 6 points down from entering the Championship play-offs. During the mid-table play-offs they secured their 7th place. Lovro Jotić was the club's top goal scorer with 147 goals.

On 24 May 2015 it was announced that Mateo Hrvatin would be returning to the club.

Over the summer president Devčić gave out statements that most of the club's debts had been paid, starting the season of on a positive note. Zamet started their season with a six-game winning streak.

On 3 October the club opened up the RK Zamet Hall of Fame, putting up the national team jerseys of Alvaro Načinović, Valter Matošević, Mirza Džomba, Renato Sulić, Nikola Blažičko and Mateo Hrvatin, who were introduced into the Hall of Fame.

Zamet finished their regular season in third place, qualifying for the Championship play-offs for the first time in ten years. Zamet finished in fourth place in the Championship play-offs, qualifying for the EHF Cup qualifiers.

During the summer of 2016 Zamet lost key players Dario Černeka, Dino Slavić, Luka Kovačević, Petar Jelušić and Bojan Lončarić, beginning their season fairly weaker. On 19 May it was announced that Marin Kružić would be returning to Zamet, and they also signed newcomer Tin Lučin.

Zamet started their 2016–17 season with a win against French team Créteil in their first EHF Cup qualifier. The second match was played in Dvorana Zamet, where Zamet, as media outlets said, had "the sweetest loss in history", as they lost 24:27. However, due to the goals scored in the first match, they passed to the next round on aggregate (56:56). Zamet's domestic season didn't start that well, losing their first match to rivals RK Poreč, conceding a draw in their second to RK Dubrava and losing their third to RK Metalac. The first two European matches took a toll on the team. They lost the first match of the second qualifiers to CSM București in București. They equalized in the second match at home and passed through to the third and final stage of the EHF Cup qualification stage. It was revealed on 17 October that Zamet would play their last qualifier against MT Melsungen.

Two days later, on the 19th, Zamet faced Ribola Kaštela at home and entered their first win in the Premier League with a score of 35:28. Their next match was on 22 October where they played against RK Rudar away in Rude, where they won a tight match (25:28).

== Venue ==
Since the foundation of the club matches were played on the playground Zamet when field handball was played. From 1973 until 2009, they played in Dvorana Mladosti, located in the suburb of Trsat.

As of 2009 the club has been playing in Centar Zamet. The capacity of the venue is 2,350 spectators.

== Seasons ==
Since the beginning of Croatian handball in 1992 Zamet has competed at the highest level in the First A League, later renamed First League and now Premier League. They spent one season in the First B League in 1995–96 after being relegated.

Season	Tier	Division	Pos.
1991–92	1	First A League	2nd
1992–93	1	First A League	6th
1993–94	1	First A League	8th
1994–95	1	First A League	9th
1995–96	2	First B League	1st
1996–97	1	First A League	5th
1997–98	1	First A League	3rd
1998–99	1	First A League	3rd
1999–00	1	First A League	7th
2000–01	1	First A League	4th
2001–02	1	First League	4th
2002–03	1	First League	5th
2003–04	1	First League	4th

Season	Tier	Division	Pos.
2004–05	1	First League	14th
2005–06	1	First League	6th
2006–07	1	First League	10th
2007–08	1	First League	8th
2008–09	1	Premier League	14th
2009–10	1	Premier League	12th
2010–11	1	Premier League	9th
2011–12	1	Premier League	7th
2012–13	1	Premier League	7th
2013–14	1	Premier League	8th
2014–15	1	Premier League	7th
2015–16	1	Premier League	4th
2016–17	1	Premier League	9th

Season	Tier	Division	Pos.
2017–18	1	Premier League	7th
2018–19	1	Premier League	8th
2019–20	1	Premier League	N/A^{1}
2020–21	1	Premier League	8th
2021–22	1	Premier League	10th
2022–23	1	Premier League	16th
2023–24	2	1. HRL Jug	1st
2024–25	1	Premier League	10th

^{1} The season was voided due to COVID-19 pandemic.

== Team ==
=== Current squad ===
Squad for the 2017–18 season

Goalkeeper

- 1 (China) Wang Quan
- 12 (Croatia) Fran Lučin
- 16 (Croatia) Marin Sorić

Wingers
RW

- 5 (Croatia) Martin Mozetić
- 6 (Croatia) Jakov Mozetić

LW

- 2 (Croatia) Damir Vučko
- 4 (Croatia) Dario Jeličić
- 20 (Croatia) Dujam Dunato

Line players

- 13 (Croatia) Veron Načinović
- 19 (Croatia) Ivan Majić

Back players
LB

- 7 (Croatia) Luka Grgurević
- 14 (China) Zhao Chen

CB

- 9 (Croatia) Nikola Njegovan
- 17 (Croatia) Antun Dunato
- 22 (Croatia) Marko Mrakovčić
- 23 (Croatia) Matija Golik

RB

- 11 (Croatia) Marin Kružić
- 15 (Croatia) Matija Starčević

=== Technical staff ===
- (Croatia) President: Vedran Devčić
- (Croatia) Sports director: Vedran Babić
- (Croatia) Head Coach: Drago Žiljak
- (Croatia) Assistant Coach: Marin Mišković
- (Croatia) Fitness Coach: Emil Baltić
- (Croatia) Fitness Coach: Dragan Marijanović
- (Croatia) Team Manager : Boris Konjuh

=== Youth academy ===
- (Croatia) Director: Damir Bogdanović
- (Croatia) Coaching staff: Saša Sardelić, Matko Novaković, Nikola Mrđen & Ivan Marenčić
- (Croatia) First-team liaison officer: Nikola Mrđen
- (Croatia) Head of goalkeeping: Valter Matošević
- (Croatia) Goalkeeper coach: Igor Saršon
- (Croatia) U-19 coach: Marin Mišković
- (Croatia) U-16 coach: Alen Kurbanović
- (Croatia) U-14 coach: Mateo Hrvatin
- (Croatia) U-10 coach: Milan Uzelac

Source: SportCom.hr

== Notable former players ==
- (Socialist Federal Republic of Yugoslavia) Stanko Jerger
- (Socialist Federal Republic of Yugoslavia) Simeon Kosanović
- (Socialist Federal Republic of Yugoslavia) Željko Kosanović
- (Socialist Federal Republic of Yugoslavia) Željko Tomac
- (Socialist Federal Republic of Yugoslavia) Ivan Munitić
- (Socialist Federal Republic of Yugoslavia) Vlado Vukoje
- (Socialist Federal Republic of Yugoslavia) Roberto Sošić
- (Socialist Federal Republic of Yugoslavia) Jurica Lakić
- (Socialist Federal Republic of Yugoslavia) Darko Srdoč
- (Socialist Federal Republic of Yugoslavia) Marijan Seđak
- (Socialist Federal Republic of Yugoslavia) Mladenko Mišković
- (Socialist Federal Republic of Yugoslavia) Željko Gašperov
- (Socialist Federal Republic of Yugoslavia) Boris Dragičević
- (Socialist Federal Republic of Yugoslavia) Boris Komucki
- (Socialist Federal Republic of Yugoslavia) Drago Žiljak
- (Socialist Federal Republic of Yugoslavia) Valter Periša
- (Socialist Federal Republic of Yugoslavia) Darko Dunato
- (Socialist Federal Republic of Yugoslavia) Željko Milanović
- (Socialist Federal Republic of Yugoslavia) Williams Černeka
- (Socialist Federal Republic of Yugoslavia) Valter Marković
- (Socialist Federal Republic of Yugoslavia) Damir Čavlović
- (Socialist Federal Republic of Yugoslavia) Ivica Rimanić
- (Socialist Federal Republic of Yugoslavia) Marin Mišković
- (Socialist Federal Republic of Yugoslavia) Tonči Peribonio
- (Croatia) Alvaro Načinović
- (Croatia) Valter Matošević
- (Croatia) Mladen Prskalo
- (Croatia) Darko Franović
- (Croatia) Valner Franković
- (Croatia) Irfan Smajlagić
- (Bosnia and Herzegovina) Zlatko Saračević
- (North Macedonia) Petar Misovski
- (Croatia) Dean Ožbolt
- (Croatia) Vladimir Šujster
- (Croatia) Robert Savković
- (Croatia) Ivan Vukas
- (Croatia) Mirza Džomba
- (Croatia) Renato Sulić
- (Croatia) Nikola Blažičko
- (Croatia) Milan Uzelac
- (Bosnia and Herzegovina) Edin Bašić
- (Qatar) Marko Bagarić
- (Croatia) Jakov Gojun
- (Croatia) Mateo Hrvatin
- (Croatia) Dario Černeka
- (Croatia) Ivan Pešić
- (Croatia) Ivan Stevanović
- (Croatia) Krešimir Kozina

== Coaches ==
- (Socialist Federal Republic of Yugoslavia) Josip Šarić (Sep 1957 – Jun 1964)
- (Socialist Federal Republic of Yugoslavia) Tomislav Mohorić☨ (Jul 1964 – Aug 1965)
- (Socialist Federal Republic of Yugoslavia) Mladenko Mišković (Aug 1965 – Apr 1966)
- (Socialist Federal Republic of Yugoslavia) Simeon Kosanović (Apr 1966 – Sep 1968)
- (Socialist Federal Republic of Yugoslavia) Stanko Jerger (Sep 1969 – May 1970)
- (Socialist Federal Republic of Yugoslavia) Mladenko Mišković☨ (May 1970 – Jun 1979)
- (Socialist Federal Republic of Yugoslavia) Vjekoslav Sardelić (Jun 1979 – Mar 1980)
- (Socialist Federal Republic of Yugoslavia) Ivica Rimanić (Mar 1980 – Jan 1981)
- (Socialist Federal Republic of Yugoslavia) Jurica Lakić☨ (Feb 1981 – Jun 1981)
- (Socialist Federal Republic of Yugoslavia) Željko Tomac (Jun 1981 – Apr 1986)
- (Socialist Federal Republic of Yugoslavia) Marijan Seđak & Milan Blagovčanin (Apr 1986 – Aug 1987)
- (Socialist Federal Republic of Yugoslavia) Vjekoslav Sardelić, Mladenko Mišković & Milan Vučković (Sep 1987 – Jul 1988)
- (Socialist Federal Republic of Yugoslavia) Josip Šojat (Jul 1988 – Jun 1990)
- (Socialist Federal Republic of Yugoslavia) Damir Čavlović (Jul 1990 – 2 Aug 1991)
- (Croatia) Drago Žiljak (2 Aug 1991 – Oct 1992)
- (Croatia) Mladenko Mišković (interim) (Oct 1992 -Jan 1993)
- (Croatia) Darko Dunato (Jan 1993 – 1 Jun 1993)
- (Croatia) Drago Žiljak (1 Jun 1993 – 1 Aug 1994)
- (Croatia) Ivan Munitić (1 Aug 1994 – 23 Jun 1995)
- (Croatia) Drago Žiljak (1 Jul 1995 – 1 Jul 1997)
- (Croatia) Ivan Munitić (1 Jul 1997 – 10 Oct 1999)
- (Croatia) Damir Čavlović (10 Oct 1999 – 27 Feb 2003)
- (Croatia) Zlatko Saračević (27 Feb 2003 – 22 Mar 2004)
- (Croatia) Franko Mileta (22 Mar 2004 – 22 Dec 2004)
- (Croatia) Williams Černeka (interim) (22 Dec 2004 – 25 Jun 2005)
- (Croatia) Boris Dragičević (25 Jun 2005 – 27 Mar 2006)
- (Croatia) Mladen Prskalo (27 Mar 2006 – 7 Feb 2007)
- (Croatia) Drago Žiljak (7 Feb 2007 – 1 Aug 2009)
- (Croatia) Damir Čavlović (1 Aug 2009 – 1 Jul 2010)
- (Croatia) Alen Kurbanović (1 Jul 2010 – 28 Sep 2012)
- (Croatia) Igor Dokmanović (interim) (2 Oct 2012 – 9 Oct 2012)
- (Croatia) Irfan Smajlagić (9 Oct 2012 – 30 May 2013)
- (Croatia) Marin Mišković (30 May 2013 – 4 March 2017)
- (Croatia) Igor Marijanović (4 March 2017 – 28 January 2018)
- (Croatia) Drago Žiljak (29 January 2018 – 4 July 2018)
- (Croatia) Nedjeljko Lalić (4 July 2018 – 21 June 2019)
- (Croatia) Valter Matošević (10 July 2019 – )

== Presidents ==
- 1957–1968 – Vittorio Drog☨ (Socialist Federal Republic of Yugoslavia)
- 1968–1977 – Stanko Jerger (Socialist Federal Republic of Yugoslavia)
- 1977–1979 – Ivan Brnabić (Socialist Federal Republic of Yugoslavia)
- 1979–1980 – Fedor Pirović (Socialist Federal Republic of Yugoslavia)
- 1980–1983 – Drago Crnčević (Socialist Federal Republic of Yugoslavia)
- 1983–1985 – Petar Čarić☨ (Socialist Federal Republic of Yugoslavia)
- 1985–1986 – Zrinko Hlača (Socialist Federal Republic of Yugoslavia)
- 1987–1997 – Josip Rechner (Socialist Federal Republic of Yugoslavia) (Croatia)
- 1998–1999 – Milan Krmpotić (Croatia)
- 1999–2001 – Marko Markanović (Croatia)
- 2001–2003 – Miljenko Mišljenović (Croatia)
- 2003–2007 – Petar Bracanović☨ (Croatia)
- 2007–2014 – Zlatko Kolić (Croatia)
- 2014–2022 - Vedran Devčić (Croatia)
- 2022-2023 – Milan Ivaniš (Croatia)
- 2023 -present – Željko Jovanović

(Croatia)

== Honours ==
=== Croatia ===
- Croatian Premier Handball League

Vice Champions (1): 1992
Third Place (2): 1997–98, 1998–99

- Croatian Handball Cup

Finalists (3): 2000, 2001, 2012

- Croatian Second Handball League (1): 1995–96

=== Yugoslavia ===
- Yugoslav Second League (2): 1977–78, 1986–87

Runner-up (2): 1979–80, 1983–84

- Yugoslav Third League (1): 1976–77
- Regional League (3): 1965–66, 1969–70, 1970–71

Runner-up (2): 1964–65, 1967–68, 1971–72

- Croatian Handball Champion (1): 1977

=== Unofficial tournaments ===
- Memorial Jurica Lakić (1): 1985
- City of Rijeka tournament (1): 1991
- Edi Berbonić tournament (1): 1991
- Hera Gold Cup (1): 1992
- Memorial Dean Ožbolt (1): 2006
- Memorial Robert Barbić Beli (3): 2008, 2014, 2015
- West Region Cup/PGŽ Cup (5): 2008, 2009, 2010, 2011, 2012, 2014

=== Other ===
- Team of the year – 1985 (awarded by Handball federation of Rijeka)
- Team of the year – 1998 (awarded by Croatian Handball Federation)
- Matija Ljubek Award – 2011 (awarded by Croatian Olympic Committee)

=== Zamet II ===
- 3. HRL – West (2): 2004–05, 2011–12
- Primorje zone league (1): 1977–78

=== Youth ===
- Croatian Handball Championship U-19 (2): 1990, 1996
- Croatian Handball Championship U-18

Runner-up (1): 2008
Third (1): 1994

- Croatian Handball Championship U-16 (1): 2016
- Croatian Handball Championship U-14 (3): 1969, 1974, 1981

Friendly tournaments

- Memorial Zvonimir Škerl (3): 1993, 1994, 2002
- Memorial Marijan Karlović (2): 2004, 2008
- Mediterranean Cup (1): 2011
- 93rd Labin republic tournament (1): 2013

=== Veterans ===
- Memorial Zvonimir Škerl (4): 1995, 1996, 1999, 2000

== European record ==
=== By competition ===
Competition	Pld	W	D	L	GF	GA	Last season played
European Champions Cup; EHF Champions League	2	1	0	1	35	36	1992–1993
EHF Cup	14	7	0	7	319	356	2016–17
EHF Cup Winners' Cup	10	3	0	7	231	246	2001–02
EHF City Cup; EHF Challenge Cup	4	3	0	1	94	85	1998–99
Total	30	14	0	16	679	723	

Source: eurohandball.com Last updated on 26 November 2016.
Pld = Matches played; W = Matches won; D = Matches drawn; L = Matches lost; GF = Goals for; GA = Goals against. Defunct competitions indicated in italics.

=== Summary by ground ===
Ground	Pld	W	D	L	GF	GA	GD
Home	15	7	0	8	349	347	+2
Away	15	6	0	9	330	371	−41
Total	30	13	0	17	679	718	−39

Source: eurohandball.com

=== By season ===
Season	Competition	Round	Date of game	Club	First game	Combined score	Second game	Club	Date of game
1992–1993	European Champions Cup	R1	9 September 1992	(Slovenia) Pivovarna Laško Celje	25–17	36–35	11 – 18	(Croatia) Zamet	23 September 1992
1998–1999	EHF City Cup	1/16	3 October 1998	(Luxembourg) HC Berchem	18–23	36- 50	18 – 27	(Croatia) Zamet Autotrans	10 October 1998
1998–1999	EHF City Cup	1/8	7 November 1998	(France) US Dunkerque HBGL	23–20	49–44	21 – 23	(Croatia) Zamet Autotrans	14 November 1998
1999–2000	EHF City Cup	1/16	3 October 1999	(Switzerland) Pfadi Winterthur	29–23	59–49	30–26	(Croatia) Zamet Autotrans	9 October 1999
2000–2001	EHF Cup Winners' Cup	R3	11 November 2000	(Belgium) HCE Tongeren	15–16	31–41	16–25	(Croatia) Zamet Crotek	12 November 2000
2000–2001	EHF Cup Winners' Cup	R4	10 December 2000	(Croatia) Zamet Crotek	20–21	41–53	21–32	(Portugal) FC Porto Vitalis	17 December 2000
2001–2002	EHF Cup Winners' Cup	R3	9 November 2001	(Croatia) Zamet Crotek	31–34	63–55	32–21	(Lithuania) Siauliai Universitetas	11 November 2001
2001–2002	EHF Cup Winners' Cup	R4	8 December 2001	(Croatia) Zamet Crotek	23–24	37–48	14–24	(France) Montpellier HB	16 December 2001
2002–2003	EHF Cup	R2	12 October 2002	(Belarus) SKA Minsk	20–28	44–49	24–21	(Croatia) Zamet Crotek	13 October 2002
2002–2003	EHF Cup	R3	12 October 2002	(Croatia) Zamet Crotek	27–24	47–42	20–18	(Netherlands) Wealer Geleen HB	16 November 2002
2002–2003	EHF Cup	R4	8 December 2002	(Russia) Dinamo Viktor Stavropol	29–18	39–18	10–0	(Croatia) Zamet Crotek	14 December 2002
2012–2013	EHF Cup	QR 1	8 September 2012	(Czech Republic) HK ASA Meso Lovoseice	27–23	59–56	32–33	(Croatia) Zamet	15 September 2012
2016–2017	EHF Cup	QR 1	2 September 2016	(France) Créteil	29–32	56–56	27–24	(Croatia) Zamet	10 September 2016
2016–2017	EHF Cup	QR 2	8 October 2016	(Romania) CSM București	29–23	50–50	27–21	(Croatia) Zamet	15 October 2016
2016–2017	EHF Cup	QR 3	19 November 2016	(Croatia) Zamet	23–34	43:66	32:20	(Germany) MT Melsungen	26 November 2016

=== Player records ===
- Most appearances in EHF club competitions: 27 appearances
  - Milan Uzelac
- Top scorer in EHF club competitions:
  - Mateo Hrvatin

== Rankings ==
=== EHF club coefficient ranking ===
(As of 30 April 2018), source: Eurotopteam website

Rank	Team	Points
154	(North Macedonia) RK Pelister	46
155	(Belgium) KV Sasja HC	46
156	(Croatia) RK ZAMET	45
157	(Germany) TBV Lemgo	44
158	(Russia) Dinamo Viktor Stavropol	44

== Related clubs ==
- ŽRK Zamet
- HNK Rijeka
- RK Pećine
- RK Mornar Crikvenica
- RK Kozala
