= Zlatko Saračević =

Croatian handball player (1961–2021)

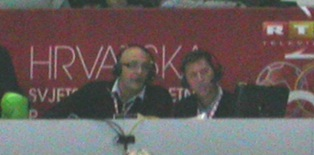
- Saračević (left) during the 2009 World Championship

Personal information
- Full name: Zlatan Saračević
- Nationality: Croatian
- Born: 5 July 1961 Banja Luka, PR Bosnia-Herzegovina, FPR Yugoslavia
- Died: 21 February 2021 (aged 59) Koprivnica, Croatia

Sport
- Sport: Handball
- Position: Right back

Youth career
- Years: Team
- –: RK Borac Banja Luka

Senior clubs
- Years: Team
- 1977–1987: RK Borac Banja Luka
- 1987–1990: RK Medveščak Zagreb
- 1990–1993: Nîmes
- 1993–1994: Bordeaux
- 1994–1995: Créteil
- 1995–1997: Istres
- 1997–2000: Badel 1862 Zagreb
- 2000–2002: Fotex Veszprém
- 2002–2003: RK Zamet Crotek
National team
Years	Team		
1980–1981	Yugoslavia U-21		
1981–1991	Yugoslavia	145	(200)
1992–2000	Croatia	75	(244)
2000–2002	Bosnia and Herzegovina		

Teams managed
- 2003–2004: RK Zamet Crotek
- 2004–2005: Nyíregyházi KSE
- 2009–2010: RK Čelik Zenica
- 2010–2015: RK Zagreb (assistant)
- 2014: RK Zagreb (interim)
- 2016–2017: RKHM Dubrovnik
- 2017–2018: Croatia (assistant)
- 2017–2018: RK Zagreb
- 2018–2021: RK Podravka
Medal record
Representing Yugoslavia
Olympic Games
Bronze medal – third place	1988 Seoul	Team
World Championship
Gold medal – first place	1986 Switzerland	Team
IHF Junior World Championship
Gold medal – first place	1981 Portugal	Team
Representing Croatia
Olympic Games
Gold medal – first place	1996 Atlanta	Team
World Championship
Silver medal – second place	1995 Iceland	Team
European Championship
Bronze medal – third place	1994 Portugal	Team
Mediterranean Games
Gold medal – first place	1993 Languedoc-Roussillon	Team

Zlatan "Zlatko" Saračević (5 July 1961 – 21 February 2021) was a Croatian professional handball player and coach who competed in the 1988 Summer Olympics for Yugoslavia and in the 1996 Summer Olympics for Croatia.

From the 2015 to 2017 World Championship he was a commentator on RTL Televizija together with Filip Brkić.

Following the domestic league match between RK Podravka, of which he was coach, and RK Lokomotiva, Saračević suffered a cardiac arrest and died in Koprivnica on 21 February 2021. He was 59.

== Playing career ==
Saračević was born in Banja Luka, present-day Bosnia and Herzegovina.

Product of the youth academy RK Borac Banja Luka, he was one of the Yugoslav players of the early 1980s, whose junior team won the world junior championship, defeating the then invincible Soviet Union in the final. With the senior Yugoslavia national team he would win the 1986 World Championship.

In 1988 he was part of the Yugoslav team which won the bronze medal. He played all six matches and scored nine goals.

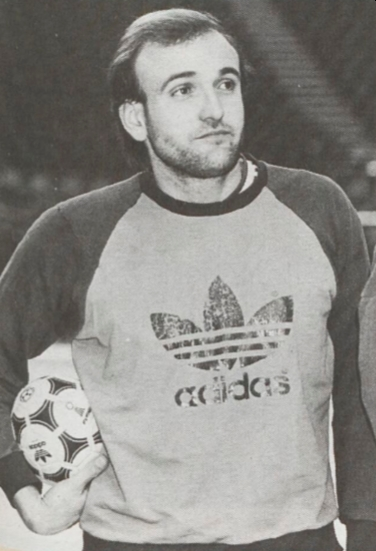
Zlatan Saračević 1988

He played for ten years in RK Borac Banja Luka winning the league and cup once. In 1987 he moved to RK Medveščak from Zagreb. During his three-year stay with the club he won the Yugoslav Cup in 1989 and 1990.

After his stint in RK Medveščak he moved to France where he played for seven years at Nîmes, Bordeaux, Créteil and at Istres. He won the French First League two times and was the league's top goalscorer three times.

In 1997 he moved to Croatian side Badel 1862 Zagreb. At the club he won during his three-year stay all league and cup titles. He also reached the EHF Champions League final twice and the semi-final once. He was also the top goalscorer in the EHF Champions League during his last two seasons.

In 2000 he moved to Fotex Veszprém where he played for two seasons winning league and cup titles while reaching the EHF Champions League final. In 2002 he moved to Zamet Crotek where he finished his playing career and started his coaching career.

While playing for Zamet in the EHF Cup match against Lukoil Dinamo Astrakhan Saračević provoked a fight during the match, all of the players and fans fought against the Russian players. Saračević got a one-year ban from playing handball in European competitions and Zamet Crotek were fined and lost the match 10–0. Saračević retired at the end of the 2002–03 season at RK Zamet Crotek.

With the senior Croatian national team Saračević won a bronze medal at the 1994 European Championship, a silver medal at the 1995 World Championship and gold medals at the 1993 Mediterranean Games and 1996 Summer Olympics. At the Olympics he played six matches including the final and scored 16 goals.

== Coaching career ==
On 27 February 2003 it was announced that Saračević had become the new head coach of RK Zamet Crotek after the sacking of Damir Čavlović.

During the rest of the 2002–03 season he was a player-coach in some matches. At the end of the season Zamet finished in fifth place while reaching the semi-final of the Croatian Cup. Failing to qualify for the EHF Cup and a bad league position in the new season forced the board's hand to sack Saračević on 22 March 2004.

He had unsuccessful stints in Nyíregyházi KSE in Hungary and NK Čelik Zenica in Bosnia and Herzegovina. For a brief time he was the assistant coach of RK Zagreb.

On 19 March 2016 he was named as the head coach of RKHM Dubrovnik.

== Honours ==
=== Player ===
Borac Banja Luka

- Yugoslav First League (1): 1980–81
- Yugoslav Cup (1): 1979

Medveščak

- Yugoslav Cup (2): 1989, 1990

USAM Nîmes

- French First League (2): 1990–91, 1992–93

Badel 1862 Zagreb

- Croatian First League (3): 1997–98, 1998–99, 1999–00
- Croatian Cup (3): 1998, 1999, 2000
- EHF Champions League Runner-up (2): 1998, 1999

Veszprém

- Hungarian First League (2): 2000–01, 2001–02
- Hungarian Cup (1): 2002
- EHF Champions League Runner-up (1): 2002
- EHF Champions Trophy Runner-up (1): 2002

=== Individual ===
- 1990–91 Division 1 top goalscorer
- Franjo Bučar State Award for Sport – 1996
- 1998–99 EHF Champions League top goalscorer – 90 goals
- Best Croatian handballer of 1999 by HRS & Sportske novosti
- 1999–2000 EHF Champions League top goalscorer – 92 goals
- Best Croatian handballer of 2002 by HRS & Sportske novosti

=== Coach ===
Zagreb

- Croatian Premier League: 2017–18
- Croatian Cup: 2018
- SEHA League runner-up: 2017–18

Podravka

- Croatian First League: 2018–19

=== Orders ===
- Order of Danica Hrvatska with face of Franjo Bučar – 1995
