= Nikola Blažičko =

Croatian handball player (born 1977)

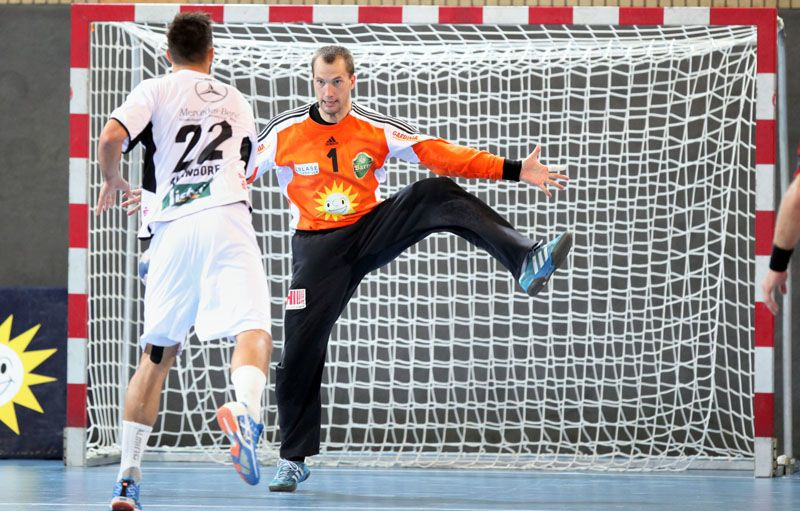
- Nikola Blazicko in Lübbecke 2014

Personal information
- Nationality: Croatian
- Born: 13 September 1977 (age 49) Rijeka, SFR Yugoslavia
- Height: 1.88 m (6 ft 2 in)

Sport
- Sport: Handball
- Position: Goalkeeper
- Number: 1

Youth career
- Years: Team
- 1991–1993: RK Zamet

Senior clubs
- Years: Team
- 1994–2000: Zamet
- 2000–2002: Split Brodokumer
- 2002–2004: Zamet Crotek
- 2004–2006: RK Zagreb
- 2006–2007: PSG
- 2007–2017: TuS Nettelstedt-Lübbecke
National team
Years	Team		
1993–1994	Croatia U-18; Croatia		
Medal record
Representing Croatia
World Championship
Silver medal – second place	2005 Tunis	Team
Mediterranean Games
Silver medal – second place	2005 Almería	Team

Nikola Blažičko (born 13 September 1977) is a former Croatian handball goalkeeper and co-trainer at Nettelstedt-Lübbecke.

== Early life ==
Blažičko grew up in Rijeka. His parents Duško and Nada were also handball players, so him becoming a handball player himself was inevitable.

== Career ==
Blažičko began his career in his hometown club Zamet in Rijeka. Soon he became a pivotal player and 1st goalkeeper at the club. In 2000 Blažičko moved to Split for 2 seasons before returning to Zamet. In 2004 he went to Croatian powerhouse Zagreb. With Zagreb Blažičko got to the finals of EHF Cup Winners' Cup in 2005.

The same year he played for the national team in World Championship in Tunis and Mediterranean Games in Almería where Croatia finished second. He also played at the 2006 European Championship in Switzerland where Croatia finished fourth losing the third-place match to Denmark 32:27.

Since 2007 he's been playing in TuS Nettelstedt-Lübbecke in Germany.

In March 2011 he was called up by Slavko Goluža to play for Croatia in the Euro-qualifiers. Unfortunately in June the same year Blažičko got injured losing his spot in the national team and being replaced with Venio Losert.

In 2015 Blažičko got another injury and didn't play for the vast majority of the season. At the end of the season his club Nettelstedt-Lübbecke was relegated to the 2. Bundesliga.

== Honours ==
Zamet

- Croatian Handball Championship U-18
  - Third (1): 1994
- Croatian Handball Championship U-19
  - Winner (1): 1996
- First B League
  - Winner (1): 1995–96
- First A League
  - Third (2): 1997–98, 1998–99
- Croatian Cup
  - Runner-up(1): 2000

Split

- First A League
  - Third (1): 2000–01

Zagreb

- First League
  - Winner (2): 2004–05, 2005–06
- Croatian Handball Cup
  - Winner (2): 2005, 2006
- EHF Cup Winners' Cup
  - Runner-up (1): 2005

PSG

- Coupe de France
  - Winner (1): 2007

TuS Nettelstedt-Lübbecke

- 2nd Bundesliga
  - Winner (1): 2016–17

Croatia

- 2005 World Championship in Tunis - 2nd
- 2005 Mediterranean Games in Almería - 2nd
- 2006 European Championship in Switzerland - 4th

Individual

- Best goalkeeper at Croatian Handball Championship U-19 - 1996
- RK Zamet hall of fame - 2015

=== Orders ===
- Order of the Croatian Trefoil - 2005
