= Dario Černeka =

Croatian handball player (born 1991)

Personal information
- Nationality: Croatian
- Born: 7 December 1991 (age 34) Rijeka, Croatia
- Height: 1.83 m (6 ft 0 in)

Sport
- Sport: Handball
- Position: Right wing
- Number: 6

Youth career
- Years: Team
- –: RK Zamet

Senior clubs
- Years: Team
- 2006-2016 2016-2017 2018: Zamet; Buzet; Varaždin 1930
National team
- Years: Team
- 2009-2010: Croatia U-21
Medal record
Youth World Championship
Gold medal – first place	2009 Tunis	Team

Dario Černeka (born 7 December 1991) is a Croatian handball player. He currently plays for RK Varaždin 1930.

He competed at the Youth World Championship in 2009.

He is the son of retired handballer Williams Černeka.

== Honours ==
Zamet

- Croatian Cup Runner-up (1): 2012
- Croatian Handball Championship U-18 Runner-up (1): 2008

Croatia U-21

- Youth World Championship (1): 2009

Individual

- Dražen Petrović Award - 2009
- Dukat Premier League shooting wing best shot percentage in 2013–14 season - 73,1%
