= Zrinjevac Sport Hall =

Indoor arena in Osijek, Croatia

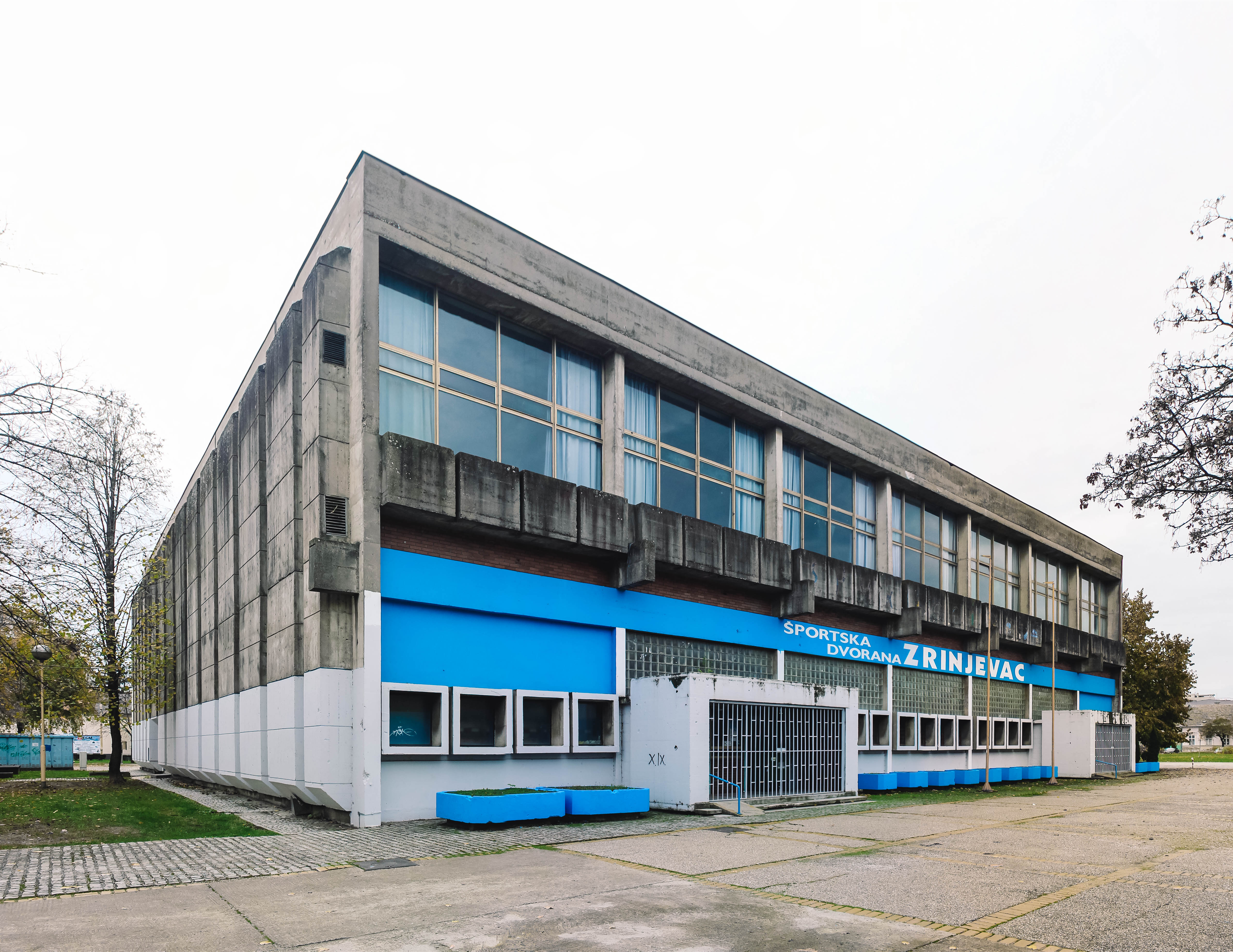
- Interactive map of Zrinjevac Sport Hall
- Full name: Športska dvorana Zrinjevac
- Location: Osijek, Croatia
- Coordinates: 45°33′18″N 18°40′49″E
- Owner: City of Osijek
- Operator: Športski objekti d.d.
- Capacity: 1,160
- Surface: Parquet

Construction
- Built: 1973
- Opened: 26 December 1973; 52 years ago
- Renovated: 2006

Tenants
- RK Osijek Elektromodul; RK Osijek Croatia osiguranje MNK Osijek

Zrinjevac Sport Hall (Croatian: Športska dvorana Zrinjevac) is an indoor arena in Osijek, Croatia. Besides for sports events it is also used for concerts.

It has capacity of 1,160 seats and it is one of bigger sport venues in Osijek (after Gradski vrt stadium and Gradski vrt Hall).

The hall was built in 1973 and opened on 26 December that year.
