= Davor Šunjić =

Croatian handball player (born 1980)

Personal information
- Nationality: Croatian
- Born: 20 September 1980 (age 46) Rijeka, SFR Yugoslavia
- Height: 1.90 m (6 ft 3 in)

Sport
- Sport: Handball
- Position: Left back
- Current club: Retired
- Number: 15

Senior clubs
- Years: Team
- 1997-2000: RK Pećine
- 2000-2005: RK Zamet
- 2005-2007: RK Crikvenica
- 2007-2012: RK Buzet
- 2012-2013: RK Zamet
- 2013-2014: RK Crikvenica

Davor Šunjić (born September 20, 1980) is a former Croatian handball player.

Šunjić started out playing for Pećine in the then First B League.

He played for five years in RK Zamet reaching the Croatian Cup final in 2001 and competing in the EHF Cup and EHF Cup Winners' Cup. Then he spent two seasons in RK Crikvenica before moving to Buzet. In buzet he played in the EHF Challenge Cup.

In 2012 Šunjić returned to RK Zamet for a season. After thirteen seasons in the top flight Šunjić retired with a season in RK Crikvenica in the second tier.
