= Marko Bagarić =

Qatari handball player (born 1985)

Personal information
- Nationality: Croatian
- Born: 31 December 1985 (age 40) Bukovica, SR Croatia, SFR Yugoslavia
- Height: 2.02 m (6 ft 8 in)

Sport
- Sport: Handball
- Position: Left back
- Current club: TuS Nettelstedt-Lübbecke
- Number: 13

Senior clubs
- Years: Team
- 2003–2006: RK Zamet
- 2006–2008: RK Perutnina PIPO IPC
- 2008–2009: Dunaferr SE
- 2009–2017: Al Rayyan
- 2017–: TuS Nettelstedt-Lübbecke
National team
- Years: Team
- 2006–2007: Croatia
- 2015–: Qatar

Marko Bagarić (born 31 December 1985) is a Croatian-born Qatari handball player who plays for TuS Nettelstedt-Lübbecke and the Qatari national team.

He participated at the 2016 Summer Olympics in Rio de Janeiro, in the men's handball tournament.
