= Marin Miculinić =

Croatian handball player (born 1971)

Personal information
- Full name: Marin Miculinić
- Nationality: Croatian
- Born: 11 April 1971 (age 55) Rijeka, SFR Yugoslavia

Sport
- Sport: Handball
- Current club: Retired
- Number: 4

Senior clubs
- Years: Team
- 1988-1999: RK Zamet
- 2002-2003: RK Zamet
Title
2001-2002	Sports Director	Zamet

Marin Miculinić (born 11 April 1971) is a former Croatian handball player.

He played for RK Zamet for 12 years and was also the sports director of the club between 2001 and 2002.

== Sources ==
- Petar Orgulić - 50 godina rukometa u Rijeci (2005), Adria public
