= Damir Bogdanović =

Croatian handball player (born 1971)

Personal information
- Full name: Damir Bogdanović
- Nationality: Croatian
- Born: 8 July 1971 (age 55) Split, SFR Yugoslavia

Sport
- Sport: Handball
- Current club: Retired
- Number: 4

Youth career
- Years: Team
- 1983-1984: RK Kozala
- 1984-1988: RK Zamet

Senior clubs
- Years: Team
- 1988-2000: RK Zamet
- 2002-2003: RK Zamet
National team
| Years | Team | |
| 1986-1987 | SR Croatia U-18 | |
Title
| 2002-2007 | Sports Director | Zamet |

Teams managed
- 2000-2002: RK Zamet (Youth)
- 2009-2012: RK Zamet II

Damir Bogdanović (born 8 July 1971) is a former Croatian handball player.

He played for RK Zamet for 12 years before taking a break to coach the youths at the club. In 2002 he played for one more season at the club before taking the sports director position.

== Honours ==
Player

- Croatian First A League
  - Vice-Champions (1): 1992
- Croatian First B League
  - Winners (1): 1995-96
- Croatian Cup
  - Finalist (1): 2000

Coach

- 3. HRL - West
  - Winners (1): 2011-12
