= Williams Černeka =

Croatian handball player (born 1959)

Personal information
- Full name: Williams Černeka
- Nationality: Croatian
- Born: 19 September 1959 (age 67) Rijeka, PR Croatia, FPR Yugoslavia

Sport
- Sport: Handball
- Position: Left wing
- Current club: Retired
- Number: 3

Youth career
- Years: Team
- 1969-1976: RK Zamet

Senior clubs
- Years: Team
- 1976-1985: RK Zamet
- 1985-1988: RK Matulji
Title
2004-present	Tehniko	RK Zamet

Teams managed
- 2004-2005: RK Zamet (interim)

Williams Černeka (born 19 September 1959) is a former Croatian handball player. Since 2002 he has been the tehniko of RK Zamet

He is the father of Dario Černeka.

== Honours ==
Zamet

- Yugoslav Second League (1): 1977-78
- Yugoslav Third League (1): 1976-77

== Sources ==
- Petar Orgulić - 50 godina rukometa u Rijeci (2005), Adria public
