= Igor Saršon =

Croatian handball player (born 1980)

Personal information
- Nationality: Croatian
- Born: 24 March 1980 (age 46) Rijeka, Croatia
- Height: 1.89 m (6 ft 2 in)

Sport
- Sport: Handball
- Position: Goalkeeper
- Current club: Retired
- Number: 12

Senior clubs
- Years: Team
- 1995-2005: RK Zamet
- 2005-2008: RK Crikvenica
- 2009-2012: RK Senj
- 2012: RK Zamet
- 2012-2013: RK Mladi Rudar
- 2013-2015: RK Crikvenica

Teams managed
- 2016-present: RK Opatija (Youth)

Igor Saršon (born 24 March 1980) is a Croatian handballer, who plays was goalkeeper and now a youth coach in Opatija.

== Honours ==
RK Zamet

- Croatian First League
  - Third (2): 1997–98, 1998–99
- 1.B HRL (1):
  - Winner1995-96
- Croatian U-19 Championship (1):
  - Winner 1996
- Croatian Cup
  - Runner-up (3): 2000, 2001, 2012
