= Dvorana Mladosti =

Sports venue in Croatia

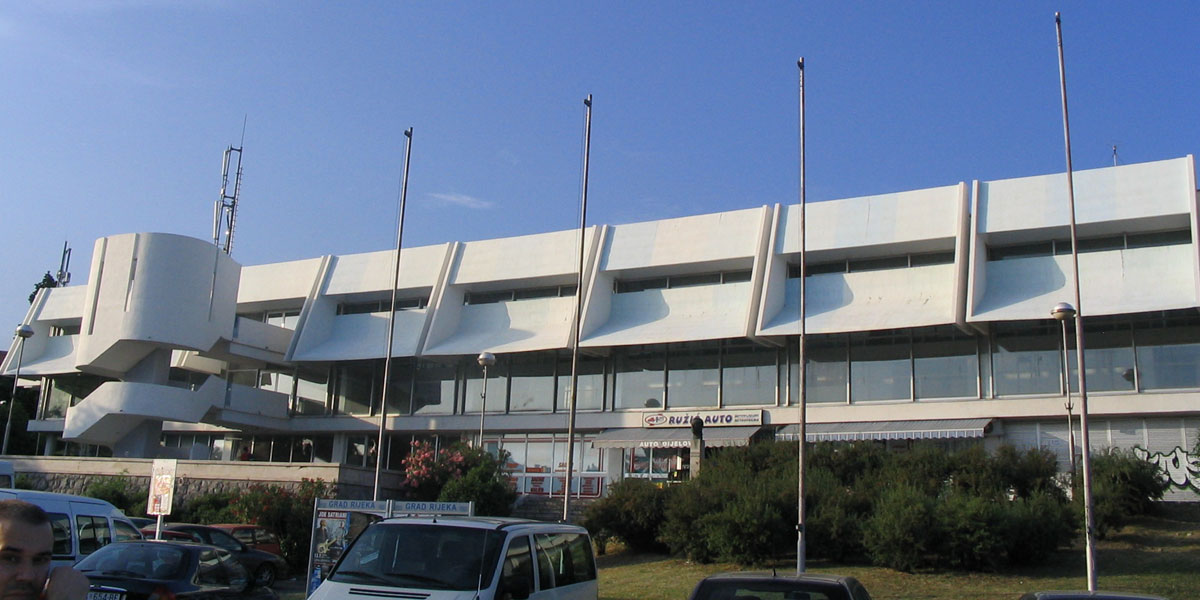
- Interactive map of Dvorana Mladosti
- Location: Trsat, Rijeka, Croatia
- Coordinates: 45.330784°N 14.460184°E
- Owner: City of Rijeka
- Capacity: 2,960

Construction
- Opened: 1973

Tenants
- KK Rijeka (1973–2009); RK Zamet (1973–2009); KK Kvarner (2009–present)

Dvorana Mladosti (English: Hall of Youth) is a sports hall in Rijeka, with sporting, cultural, business and entertainment events. The capacity of the hall is 2,960 seats and 1,000 standing places.

== History ==
The hall was built in Trsat in 1973. The size of the hall is 5,458 m^{2}, and the surface of outer space is 10,486 m^{2}. The main part of the hall consists of the main arena, two small halls for heating, a hall for judo, karate, weightlifting and billiards hall, and in the halls there are 4 dressing rooms, 2 fitness centres, office spaces and sports associations, press centre and catering facilities and retail spaces.

== Major events ==
- 1987 IHF Men's Junior World Championship
- 2000 European Men's Handball Championship
- 2003 World Women's Handball Championship
