= 2014–15 RK Zamet season =

Zamet Rijeka
2014–15 season
- President: Vedran Devčić
- Coach: Marin Mišković
- Venue: Centar Zamet
- Dukat Premier League: 7th
- Croatian Cup: Quarter-finals
- Top goalscorer: League: Lovro Jotić (141); All: Lovro Jotić (147)
- Highest home attendance: 1,300 vs (Croatia) Zagreb CO (27 Aug 2014 - Centar Zamet)
- Lowest home attendance: 100 vs (Croatia) Gorica (18 April 2015 - Centar Zamet)
- Average home league attendance: 300
Home colours	Away colours

The 2014–15 season was the 58th season in RK Zamet’s history. It is their 7th successive season in the Dukat Premier League, and 37th successive top tier season.

== First team squad ==
Goalkeeper

- 1 (Croatia) Marin Đurica
- 12 (Croatia) Korado Juričić
- 16 (Croatia) Dino Slavić

Wingers
RW

- 3 (Croatia) Sandro Samardžić
- 6 (Croatia) Dario Černeka
- 11 (Croatia) Filip Glavaš

LW

- 2 (Croatia) Damir Vučko
- 9 (Croatia) Viktor Stipčić

Line players

- 7 (Croatia) Milan Uzelac (captain)
- 10 (Croatia) Marko Jerčinović
- 23 (Croatia) Filip Briški

Back players
LB

- 8 (Croatia) Bojan Lončarić
- 15 (Croatia) Petar Jelušić
- 18 (Croatia) Lovro Jotić

CB

- 5 (Croatia) Luka Mrakovčić
- 14 (Croatia) Matija Golik
- 17 (Croatia) Raul Valković

RB

- 22 (Croatia) Marko Mrakovičić
- 13 (Croatia) Luka Kovačević

=== Technical staff ===
- (Croatia) President: Vedran Devčić
- (Croatia) Sports director: Vedran Babić
- (Croatia) Head Coach: Marin Mišković
- (Croatia) Assistant Coach: Valter Matošević
- (Croatia) Goalkeeper Coach: Valter Matošević
- (Croatia) Fitness Coach: Dragan Marijanović
- (Croatia) Tehniko: Williams Černeka

== Competitions ==
=== Overall ===
Competition	First match	Last match	Starting round	Final position	Record							
Competition	First match	Last match	Starting round	Final position	G	W	D	L	GF	GA	GD	Win %
Dukat Premier League - Regular season	6 September 2014	28 March 2015	Matchday 1	5th	26	13	2	11	745	681	+64	50.00
Dukat Premier League - Play-offs	11 April 2015	27 May 2015	Matchday 1	7th	6	5	0	1	190	165	+25	83.33
Croatian Cup	20 December 2014	17 March 2015	Qualifying Round	Quarter-final	2	1	0	1	63	60	+3	50.00
Total					35	20	2	13	1,037	932	+105	57.14

== Matches ==
=== Dukat Premier League ===
Pos.	Team	Pld.	W	D	L	Goal+	Goal-	Pts.	Qualification or relegation
1.	Varaždin 1930	26	21	1	4	800	648	43	Championship play-offs
2.	Dubrava	26	19	1	6	816	724	39	Championship play-offs
3.	Poreč	26	19	1	6	783	704	39	Championship play-offs
4.	Umag	26	16	2	8	748	693	34	Championship play-offs
5.	Zamet	26	13	2	11	745	681	28	Mid-table play-offs
6.	Gorica	26	13	0	13	702	705	26	Mid-table play-offs
7.	Spačva	26	13	0	13	692	698	26	Mid-table play-offs
8.	Karlovac	26	12	1	13	622	652	25	Mid-table play-offs
9.	Kaštela	26	11	1	14	636	652	23	Relegation play-off
10.	Đakovo	26	10	0	16	708	738	20	Relegation play-off
11.	Ivanić	26	8	3	15	648	712	19	Relegation play-off
12.	Buzet	26	8	2	16	643	665	18	Relegation play-off
13.	Bjelovar	26	8	0	18	707	760	16	Relegation play-off
14.	Koteks Split	26	3	2	21	539	757	8	Relegation play-off

=== Matches ===
6 September 2014 1	Zamet	24:24	Buzet	Rijeka
18:00 CEST		Report		Stadium: Centar Zamet; Attendance: 300; Referee: Igor Barle & Saša Vučić (Zagreb, Croatia)

13 September 2014 2	Umag	28:22	Zamet	Umag
20:00 CEST		Report		Stadium: ŠSD Umag; Attendance: 200; Referee: Dražen Gladović & Goran Volenik (Virovitica))

20 September 2014 3	Zamet	28:36	Dubrava	Rijeka
19:00 CEST		Report		Stadium: Centar Zamet; Attendance: 350; Referee: Josip Cepanec(Turčin) & Ranko Jeftić (Varaždin, Croatia)

27 September 2014 4	Split Koteks	33:33	Zamet	Rijeka
33:33 CEST		Report		Stadium: S.C. Gripe; Attendance: 100; Referee: Ante Pavić & Mate Torbarina (Zadar)

4 October 2014 5	Zamet	35:29	Gorica	Rijeka
19:00 CEST		Report		Stadium: Dvorana Mladosti; Attendance: 250; Referee: Dražen Gladović & Goran Volenik (Virovitica)

12 October 2014 6	Kaštela	25:24	Zamet	Kaštel Sućurac
18:00 CEST		Report		Stadium: SD Sokolana; Attendance: 200; Referee: Igor Barle & Saša Vučić. (Zagreb, Croatia)

18 October 2014 7	Zamet	28:22	Karlovac	Rijeka
17:00 CEST		Report		Stadium: Centar Zamet; Attendance: 200; Referee: Igor Hunjadi & Marijo Zečević (Zagreb, Croatia)

25 October 2014 8	Spačva	23:19	Zamet	Vinkovci
18:00 CEST		Report		Stadium: OŠ Bartola Kasića; Attendance: 150; Referee: Dalibor Jurinović (Zadar) & Marko Mrvica (Biograd na Moru)

8 November 2014 9	Zamet	28:24	Poreč	Rijeka
18:00 CEST				Stadium: Centar Zamet; Attendance: 200; Referee: Bosak i Herceg (Štivica, Croatia)

15 November 2014 10	Ivanić	27:35	Zamet	Ivanić Grad
18:00 CEST		Report		Stadium: Žeravinec; Attendance: 250; Referee: Marija Gubica (Petrijevci, Croatia) & Boris Milošević (Osijek, Croatia)

22 November 2014 11	Zamet	24:26	Varaždin 1930	Rijeka
18:00 CEST		Report		Stadium: Centar Zamet; Attendance: 300; Referee: Dalibor Jurinović (Zadar) & Marko Mrvica (Biograd na Moru)

29 November 2014 12	Zamet	29:27	Bjelovar	Rijeka
18:00 CEST		Report		Stadium: Centar Zamet; Attendance: 150; Referee: Ivan Klapež(Dugopolje, Croatia) & Ivan Pervan(Trilj, Croatia)

3 December 2014 13	Đakovo	24:25	Zamet	Đakovo
17:00 CEST		Report		Stadium: NSD Đakovo; Attendance: 100; Referee: Vanja Banović & Vedran Banović (Požega, Croatia)

6 December 2014 14	Buzet	17:21	Zamet	Buzet
19:00 CEST		Report		Stadium: SD Buzet; Attendance: 200; Referee: Matija Gubica & Boris Milošević (Osijek, Croatia)

13 December 2014 15	Zamet	31:20	Umag	Rijeka
18:00 CEST				Stadium: Centar Zamet; Attendance: 300; Referee: Ante Pavić & Mate Torbarina (Zadar, Croatia)

11 February 2015 16	Dubrava	33:27	Zamet	Zagreb
19:00 CEST		Report		Stadium: SD Dubrava; Attendance: 200; Referee: Vanja Banović & Vedran Banović (Požega, Croatia)

14 February 2015 17	Zamet	44:16	Split Koteks	Rijeka
18:00 CEST		Report		Stadium: Centar Zamet; Attendance: 200; Referee: Davor Lončar & Zoran Lončar (Varaždin, Croatia)

21 February 2015 18	Gorica	25:33	Zamet	Velika Gorica
19:00 CEST		Report		Stadium: Dvorana srednjih strukovnih škola Attendance: 200; Referee: Dražen Gladović & Goran Volenik (Virovitica, Croatia)

25 February 2015 19	Zamet	36:24	Kaštela	Rijeka
18:00 CEST		Report		Stadium: Centar Zamet; Attendance: 300; Referee: Igor Hunjadi i Marijo Zečević (Zagreb, Croatia)

28 February 2015 20	Karlovac	22:21	Zamet	Karlovac
17:30 CEST		Report		Stadium: Dvorana Mladosti; Attendance: 200; Referee: Igor Barle & Saša Vučić (Zagreb, Croatia)

4 March 2015 21	Zamet	36:27	Spačva	Rijeka
18:00 CEST		Report		Stadium: Centar Zamet; Attendance: 100; Referee: Matija Gubica & Boris Milošević (Osijek, Croatia)

7 March 2015 22	Poreč	29 : 27	Zamet	Poreč
19:00 CEST		Report		Stadium: SRC Veli Jože; Attendance: 200; Referee: Matija Gubica & Boris Milošević (Osijek, Croatia)

14 March 2015 23	Zamet	34:30	Ivanić	Rijeka
18:00 CEST		Report		Stadium: Centar Zamet; Attendance: 250; Referee: Siniša Bosak & Željko Herceg (Varaždin)

20 March 2015 24	Varaždin 1930	32:27	Zamet	Varaždin
18:00 CEST		Report		Stadium: GSD Arena; Attendance: 300; Referee: Ante Pavić & Mate Torbarina (Zadar, Croatia)

25 March 2015 25	Bjelovar	28:27	Zamet	Bjelovar
19:00 CEST		Report		Stadium: ŠSD Bjelovar; Attendance: 100; Referee: Vanja Banović & Vedran Banović (Požega, Croatia)

28 March 2015 26	Zamet	29:30	Đakovo	Rijeka
16:00 CEST		Report		Stadium: Centar Zamet; Attendance: 200; Referee: Ivan Klapež(Dugopolje, Croatia) & Ivan Pervan(Trilj, Croatia)

=== Play-offs ===
Pos.	Team	Pld.	W	D	L	Goal+	Goal-	Pts.	Place
1.	Zamet	6	5	0	1	190	165	10	7th
2.	Spačva	6	4	0	2	170	161	8	8th
3.	Gorica	6	2	0	4	170	171	4	9th
4.	Karlovac	6	1	0	5	150	183	2	10th

=== Matches ===
11 April 2015 1	Zamet	34:24	Karlovac	Rijeka
18:00 CEST		Report		Stadium: Centar Zamet; Attendance: 100; Referee: Siniša Bosak & Željko Herceg (Varaždin)

18 April 2015 2	Zamet	34:30	Gorica	Rijeka
17:00 CEST		Report		Stadium: Centar Zamet; Attendance: 100; Referee: Ante Pavić & Mate Torbarina (Zadar, Croatia)

25 April 2015 3	Vinkovci	30:29	Zamet	Vinkovci
19:00 CEST		Report		Stadium: SD Vinkovci; Attendance: 100; Referee: Siniša Bosak & Željko Herceg (Varaždin)

9 May 2015 4	Karlovac	24:32	Zamet	Karlovac
19:00 CEST		Report		Stadium: Dvorana Mladosti; Attendance: 100; Referee: Siniša Bosak & Željko Herceg (Varaždin)

23 May 2015 5	Gorica	28:31	Zamet	Velika Gorica
18:00 CEST		Report		Stadium: Dvorana Srednjih škola Attendance: 200; Referee: Siniša Bosak & Željko Herceg (Varaždin)

27 May 2015 6	Zamet	30:29	Spačva	Rijeka
18:00 CEST		Report		Stadium: Centar Zamet; Attendance: 100; Referee: Robert Kober (Zagreb) & Igor Sunajko (Dugo Selo)

=== PGŽ Cup - Qualifier matches ===
20 December 2014 Final	Kozala	26:39	Zamet	Rijeka
17:30 CEST		Report		Stadium: Dvorana Dinko Lukarića; Attendance: 300; Referee: Robert Bernobić & Nikša Kalčić (Rijeka)

=== Matches ===
17 March 2015 Quarter-final	Zamet	24:34	PPD Zagreb	Rijeka
18:00 CEST		Report		Stadium: Centar Zamet; Attendance: 1,000; Referee: Igor Hunjadi & Marijo Zečević(Varaždin)

=== Memorial Robert Barbić - Beli ===
31 August 2014 Semi-final	Zamet	22:21	Kozala	Senj
14:20 CEST		Report		Stadium: Sportska dvorana Senj; Attendance: 300; Referee: Igor Prpić i Bruno Štefančić (Rijeka, Croatia)

31 August 2014 Final	Zamet	32:20	Senj	Senj
18:00 CEST		Report		Stadium: Sportska dvorana Senj; Attendance: 300; Referee: Igor Prpić i Bruno Štefančić (Rijeka, Croatia)

=== Friendly matches ===
27 August 2014 Friendly	Zamet	24:37	Zagreb CO	Rijeka
19:00 CEST		Report		Stadium: Centar Zamet; Attendance: 1,300; Referee: Robert Bernobić & Nikša Kalčić (Rijeka)

19 January 2015 Friendly	Zamet (Croatia)	32:30	(Romania) Baia Mare	Rijeka
19:00 CEST		Report		Stadium: Centar Zamet; Attendance: 300; Referee: Robert Bernobić & Nikša Kalčić (Rijeka, Croatia)

=== Appearances and goals ===
Number	Position	Player	Apps	Goals	Apps	Goals	Apps	Goals	Apps	Goals
Number	Position	Player	Total		Dukat Premier League		Croatian Cup		Other Matches	
1	GK	(Croatia) Marin Đurica	36	1	31	1	1	0	4	0
2	LW	(Croatia) Damir Vučko	32	125	31	121	1	4	0	0
3	RW	(Croatia) Sandro Samardžić	5	0	5	0	0	0	0	0
4	LW	(Croatia) Marijan Klić	2	0	1	0	0	0	1	0
5	RB	(Croatia) Luka Mrakovčić	18	85	18	85	1	1	2	0
6	RW	(Croatia) Dario Černeka	37	143	32	140	1	2	4	2
7	LP	(Croatia) Milan Uzelac	33	49	28	48	1	0	4	1
8	LB	(Croatia) Bojan Lončarić	7	11	7	11	0	0	0	0
9	LW	(Croatia) Viktor Stipčić	20	32	17	30	1	2	2	0
10	RB	(Croatia) Marko Jerčinović	15	14	14	13	1	1	0	0
11	RW	(Croatia) Filip Glavaš	26	17	25	16	1	1	0	0
12	GK	(Croatia) Korado Juričić	31	0	28	0	1	0	2	0
13	RB	(Croatia) Luka Kovačević	31	77	28	76	1	1	2	0
14	CB	(Croatia) Matija Golik	28	52	27	51	1	1	0	0
15	LB	(Croatia) Petar Jelušić	34	94	31	90	1	4	2	0
16	GK	(Croatia) Dino Slavić	27	0	27	0	0	0	0	0
17	CB	(Croatia) Raul Valković	33	98	32	97	1	1	0	0
18	LB	(Croatia) Lovro Jotić	32	147	29	141	1	6	2	0
19	CB	(Croatia) Ivan Majić	7	1	7	1	0	0	0	0
20	RB	(Croatia) Gordan Broznić	3	0	3	0	0	0	0	0
21	RB	(Croatia) Antonio Vozila	1	0	1	0	0	0	0	0
22	RB	(Croatia) Marko Mrakovčić	9	4	9	4	0	0	0	0
23	LP	(Croatia) Filip Briški	11	4	11	4	0	0	0	0
	CB	(Croatia) Dino Islamović	2	0	2	0	0	0	0	0
		(Croatia) Fabijan Ljevar	2	0	2	0	0	0	0	0
		(Croatia) Filip Grbčić	1	0	1	0	0	0	0	0
		(Croatia) Ivan Ivković	3	5	3	5	0	0	0	0

Source: League Squad

=== Goalkeepers ===
No	Name	Gms.	Av.S.	Saves	%	Wing	%	7m	%	9m	%	6m	%	Brkt.	%	FB	%
1	Marin Đurica	31 (29)	5,77	179/569	31%	34/97	35%	16/74	22%	99/234	42%	21/119	18%	2/14	14%	7/31	23%
12	Korado Juričić	28 (18)	1,64	46/130	35%	8/19	42%	6/14	43%	27/58	47%	3/30	10%	1/5	20%	1/4	25%
16	Dino Slavić	27 (24)	7,70	208/578	36%	40/90	44%	7/49	14%	120/229	52%	30/138	22%	5/25	20%	6/47	13%

Source: League Squad

== Transfers ==
=== In ===
Date	Position	Player	From	To
28 Jul 2014	LB	(Croatia) Lovro Jotić	(Croatia) Umag	Zamet
29 Jul 2014	LB	(Croatia) Petar Jelušić	(Croatia) Matulji	Zamet

=== Out ===
Date	Position	Player	From	To
1 June 2014	LB	(Croatia) Josip Jurić-Grgić	Zamet	Dubrava
1 June 2015	LB	(Croatia) Lovro Jotić	Zamet	Dubrava
