= 2015–16 RK Zamet season =

Zamet Rijeka
2015–16 season
- President: Vedran Devčić
- Coach: Marin Mišković
- Venue: Centar Zamet
- Dukat Premier League: 4th
- Croatian Cup: Quarter-final
- Top goalscorer: League: Mateo Hrvatin (140); All: Mateo Hrvatin (161)
- Highest home attendance: 1,000 vs PPD Zagreb (10 May 2016 - Centar Zamet)
- Lowest home attendance: 100 vs Ribola Kaštela (1 May 2016 - Dvorana Mladosti)
- Average home league attendance: 500
Home colours	Away colours

The 2015–16 season was the 59th season in RK Zamet’s history. It is their 8th successive season in the Dukat Premier League, and 38nd successive top tier season.

== First team squad ==
Goalkeeper

- 1 (Croatia) Marin Đurica
- 16 (Croatia) Dino Slavić

Wingers
RW

- 6 (Croatia) Dario Černeka
- 11 (Croatia) Filip Glavaš

LW

- 4 (Croatia) Mateo Hrvatin (vice-captain)
- 9 (Croatia) Viktor Stipčić

Line players

- 7 (Croatia) Milan Uzelac (captain)
- 20 (Croatia) Jadranko Stojanović

Back players
LB

- 8 (Croatia) Bojan Lončarić
- 15 (Croatia) Petar Jelušić
- 23 (Croatia) David Miličević

CB

- 14 (Croatia) Matija Golik
- 17 (Croatia) Raul Valković
- 18 (Croatia) Paulo Grozdek

RB

- 5 (Croatia) Marko Mrakovčić
- 13 (Croatia) Luka Kovačević

=== Out on loan ===
- (Croatia) Korado Juričić (at (Croatia) Mladi Rudar)

=== Injured ===
- (Croatia) Dario Černeka

=== Technical staff ===
- (Croatia) President: Vedran Devčić
- (Croatia) Sports director: Vedran Babić
- (Croatia) Head Coach: Marin Mišković
- (Croatia) Assistant Coach: Valter Matošević
- (Croatia) Goalkeeper Coach: Valter Matošević
- (Croatia) Fitness Coach: Dragan Marijanović
- (Croatia) Tehniko: Williams Černeka

== Competitions ==
=== Overall ===
Competition	First match	Last match	Starting round	Final position	Record							
Competition	First match	Last match	Starting round	Final position	G	W	D	L	GF	GA	GD	Win %
Dukat Premier League - Regular season	5 September 2015	2 April 2016	Matchday 1	3rd	26	17	2	7	731	638	+93	65.38
Dukat Premier League - Play-offs	16 April 2016	31 May 2016	Matchday 1	4th	10	3	0	7	268	310	−42	30.00
Croatian Cup	19 December 2015	16 March 2016	Quarter-final	Round of 16	2	1	0	1	61	63	−2	50.00
Total					38	21	2	15	1,060	1,011	+49	55.26

== Dukat Premier League ==
=== Dukat Premier League ===
Pos.	Team	Pld.	W	D	L	Goal+	Goal-	Pts.	Qualification or relegation
1.	Varaždin 1930	26	20	2	4	719	627	42	Championship play-offs
2.	Dubrava	26	18	1	7	808	724	37	Championship play-offs
3.	Zamet	26	17	2	7	731	638	36	Championship play-offs
4.	Umag	26	16	2	8	667	633	34	Championship play-offs
5.	Kaštela	26	14	4	8	721	693	32	Relegation play-offs
6.	Poreč	26	14	2	10	679	642	30	Relegation play-offs
7.	Gorica	26	13	3	10	717	698	29	Relegation play-offs
8.	Vinkovci	26	13	3	10	687	671	29	Relegation play-offs
9.	Ivanić	26	10	5	11	713	714	25	Relegation play-offs
10.	Moslavina	26	9	1	16	652	716	19	Relegation play-offs
11.	Buzet	26	8	1	17	600	643	17	Relegation
12.	Đakovo	26	6	2	18	689	795	14	Relegation
13.	Medveščak	26	5	1	21	717	803	11	Relegation
14.	Karlovac	26	4	1	21	645	748	9	Relegation

=== Matches ===
5 September 2015 1	Karlovac	17:27	Zamet	Karlovac
19:00 CEST		Report		Stadium: SŠD Mladost; Attendance: 150; Referee: Igor Barle & Saša Vučić (Zagreb, Croatia)

16 September 2015 3	Medveščak	25:36	Zamet	Zagreb
18:00 CEST		Report		Stadium: ŠD Sutinska vrela Attendance: 150; Referee: Dalibor Jurinović (Zadar) & Mario Mrvica (Biograd na Moru))

19 September 2015 4	Zamet	31:24	Moslavina	Rijeka
19:00 CEST		Report		Stadium: Centar Zamet; Attendance: 200; Referee: Davor Lončar & Zoran Lončar (Varaždin, Croatia)

23 September 2015 2	Zamet	27:24	Varaždin	Rijeka
18:00 CEST		Report		Stadium: Centar Zamet; Attendance: 250; Referee: Ivica Glavinić & Mile Veraja (Metković, Croatia)

26 September 2015 5	Spačva	20:24	Zamet	Rijeka
19:00 CEST		Report		Stadium: OŠ Bartola Kašića; Attendance: 100; Referee: Ivica Glavinić (Petrijevci, Croatia) & Mile Veraja (Osijek, Croatia)

30 September 2015 6	Zamet	31:17	Buzet	Rijeka
19:00 CEST		Report		Stadium: Centar Zamet; Attendance: 500; Referee: Igor Hunjadi i Marijo Zečević (Zagreb, Croatia)

3 October 2015 7	Poreč	26:21	Zamet	Poreč
19:00 CEST		Report		Stadium: Dvorana Veli Jože; Attendance: 200; Referee: Tomislav Cindrić i Robert Gonzurek (Osijek, Croatia)

10 October 2015 8	Zamet	23:24	Ivanić	Rijeka
17:00 CEST		Report		Stadium: Centar Zamet; Attendance: 200; Referee: Ante Pavić i Mate Torbarina (Zadar, Croatia)

17 October 2015 9	Dubrava	30:28	Zamet	Zagreb
17:00 CEST		Report		Stadium: SD Dubrava; Attendance: 200; Referee: Igor Emanović i Zoran Mikić (Štivica, Croatia)

24 October 2015 10	Zamet	26:19	Kaštela	Rijeka
18:00 CEST		Report		Stadium: Centar Zamet; Attendance: 200; Referee: Igor Barle i Saša Vučić (Zagreb, Croatia)

31 October 2015 11	Gorica	29:25	Zamet	Velika Gorica
18:00 CEST		Report		Stadium: Dvorana srednjih strukovnih škola Attendance: 200; Referee: Tomislav Cindrić i Robert Gonzurek (Osijek, Croatia)

14 November 2015 12	Đakovo	27:35	Zamet	Đakovo
19:00 CEST		Report		Stadium: GNSD; Attendance: 200; Referee: Robert Kober(Zagreb, Croatia) i Igor Sunajko(Dugo Selo, Croatia)

21 November 2015 13	Zamet	28:20	Umag	Rijeka
17:00 CEST		Report		Stadium: Centar Zamet; Attendance: 400; Referee: Marija Gubica (Petrijevci, Croatia) & Boris Milošević (Osijek, Croatia)

28 November 2015 14	Zamet	25:24	Karlovac	Rijeka
17:00 CEST		Report		Stadium: Centar Zamet; Attendance: 160; Referee: Igor Barle & Saša Vučić (Zagreb, Croatia)

6 December 2015 15	Varaždin 1930	25:22	Zamet	Varaždin
18:00 CEST		Report		Stadium: GSD Arena; Attendance: 150; Referee: Ante Pavić & Mate Torbarina (Zadar, Croatia)

12 December 2015 16	Zamet	40:33	Medveščak	Rijeka
18:00 CEST		Report		Stadium: Centar Zamet; Attendance: 220; Referee: Igor Emanović & Zoran Mikić (Štivica, Croatia)

16 December 2015 17	Kutina	22:24	Zamet	Kutina
18:00 CEST		Report		Stadium: Sportska dvorana Kutina; Attendance: 200; Referee: Davor Lončar & Zoran Lončar (Varaždin, Croatia)

6 February 2016 18	Zamet	28:27	Spačva	Rijeka
18:00 CEST		Report		Stadium: Dvorana Mladosti; Attendance: 250; Referee: Igor Hunjadi i Marijo Zečević (Zagreb, Croatia)

13 February 2016 19	Buzet	22:39	Zamet	Buzet
19:00 CEST		Report		Stadium: SD Buzet; Attendance: 100; Referee: Tomislav Cindrić i Robert Gonzurek (Osijek, Croatia)

20 February 2016 20	Zamet	29:22	Poreč	Rijeka
18:00 CEST		Report		Stadium: Centar Zamet; Attendance: 380; Referee: Ivica Glavinić (Petrijevci, Croatia) & Mile Veraja (Osijek, Croatia)

27 February 2016 21	Ivanić	30:28	Zamet	Ivanić-Grad
17:00 CEST		Report		Stadium: Dvorana Žeravinec; Attendance: 200; Referee: Igor Emanović & Zoran Mikić (Štivica, Croatia)

5 March 2016 23	Zamet	28 : 27	Dubrava	Rijeka
18:00 CEST		Report		Stadium: Centar Zamet; Attendance: 200; Referee: Igor Barle & Saša Vučić (Zagreb, Croatia)

13 March 2016 24	Kaštela	19:19	Zamet	Kaštel Sućurac
18:00 CEST		Report		Stadium: Sportska dvorana Sokolana, Kaštel Sućurac; Attendance: 200; Referee: Igor Barle & Saša Vučić (Zagreb, Croatia)

19 March 2016 25	Zamet	27:27	Gorica	Rijeka
18:00 CEST		Report		Stadium: Centar Zamet; Attendance: 200; Referee: Igor Barle & Saša Vučić (Zagreb, Croatia)

22 March 2016 26	Zamet	41:27	Đakovo	Rijeka
18:00 CEST		Report		Stadium: Centar Zamet; Attendance: 200; Referee: Davor Lončar & Zoran Lončar (Zagreb, Croatia)

2 April 2016 27	Umag	31:28	Zamet	Velika Gorica
17:00 CEST		Report		Stadium: ŠD Marije i Line; Attendance: 300; Referee: Igor Emanović & Zoran Mikić (Štivica, Croatia)

=== Play-offs ===
Pos.	Team	Pld.	W	D	L	Goal+	Goal-	Pts.	Qualification
1.	PPD Zagreb	10	10	0	0	357	236	20	SEHA League, EHF Champions League
2.	NEXE Našice	10	8	0	2	336	242	16	SEHA League
3.	Varaždin 1930	10	5	0	5	281	296	10	EHF Cup
4.	Zamet	10	3	0	7	268	310	6	EHF Cup
5.	Dubrava	10	3	0	7	288	335	6	
6.	Umag	10	1	0	9	254	365	2	

=== Matches ===
16 April 2016 1	NEXE	32:27	Zamet	Našice
19:00 CEST		Report		Stadium: Dvorana Kralj Tomislava; Attendance: 300; Referee: Igor Hunjadi i Marijo Zečević (Zagreb, Croatia)

20 April 2016 2	Zamet	26:32	Varaždin 1930	Rijeka
19:00 CEST		Report		Stadium: Centar Zamet; Attendance: 350; Referee: Dalibor Jurinović (Zadar, Croatia) i Marko Mrvica (Biograd na Moru, Croatia)

24 April 2016 3	Dubrava	27:25	Zamet	Zagreb
18:00 CEST		Report		Stadium: SD Dubrava; Attendance: 200; Referee: Marija Gubica (Petrijevci, Croatia) & Boris Milošević (Osijek, Croatia)

27 April 2016 4	Umag	23:25	Zamet	Umag
20:00 CEST		Report		Stadium: SŠD Marije i Line; Attendance: 300; Referee: Igor Hunjadi i Marijo Zečević (Zagreb, Croatia)

7 May 2016 6	Zamet	23:33	NEXE	Rijeka
19:00 CEST		Report		Stadium: Centar Zamet; Attendance: 500; Referee: Marija Gubica (Petrijevci, Croatia) & Boris Milošević (Osijek, Croatia)

10 May 2016 5	Zamet	23:33	PPD Zagreb	Rijeka
19:00 CEST		Report		Stadium: Centar Zamet; Attendance: 1,000; Referee: Marija Gubica (Petrijevci, Croatia) & Boris Milošević (Osijek, Croatia)

18 May 2016 7	Varaždin 1930	29:25	Zamet	Varaždin
17:00 CEST		Report		Stadium: Varaždin Arena; Attendance: 300

25 May 2016 10	PPD Zagreb	39:22	Zamet	Zagreb
17:00 CEST		Report		Stadium: Kutija Šibica; Attendance: 200; Referee: Robert Koper (Zagreb, Croatia) & Igor Sunajko (Dugo Selo, Croatia

28 May 2016 9	Zamet	35:27	Umag	Rijeka
17:00 CEST		Report		Stadium: Centar Zamet; Attendance: 300; Referee: Igor Brale & Saša Vučić (Zagreb, Croatia)

31 May 2016 8	Zamet	34:30	Dubrava	Rijeka
17:00 CEST		Report		Stadium: Centar Zamet; Attendance: 200; Referee: Marija Gubica (Petrijevci, Croatia) & Boris Milošević (Osijek, Croatia)

=== PGŽ Cup - Qualifier matches ===
19 December 2015 Final	Zamet	33:31	Kozala	Rijeka
18:00 CEST		Report		Stadium: Centar Zamet; Attendance: 150; Referee: Robert Bernobić & Nikša Kalčić

=== Matches ===
16 March 2016 Quarter-finals	Varaždin 1930	32:28	Zamet	Varaždin
17:00 CEST		Report		Stadium: Arena Varaždin; Attendance: 300; Referee: Igor Emanović i Zoran Mikić (Štivica, Croatia)

=== Friendlies ===
21 August 2015 Friendly	Zamet	31:29	Umag	Rijeka
17:00 CEST		Report		Stadium: Centar Zamet; Attendance: 40; Referee: ?

24 August 2015 Friendly	Zamet	31:25	Kozala	Rijeka
17:00 CEST		Report		Stadium: Centar Zamet; Attendance: 100; Referee: ?

26 August 2015 Friendly	Zamet (Croatia)	27:27	(Slovenia) RD Koper 2013	Rijeka
19:30 CEST		Report		Stadium: Centar Zamet; Attendance: 100; Referee: Alen Berbonić & Dino Kalčić (Rijeka, Croatia)

9 March 2016 Friendly	Zamet (Croatia)	22:25	(North Macedonia) Metalurg	Rijeka
19:30 CEST		Report		Stadium: Centar Zamet; Attendance: 400; Referee: Alen Berbonić & Dino Kalčić (Rijeka, Croatia)

=== Memorial Robert Barbić - Beli ===
29 August 2015 Semi-final	Zamet	22:14	Kaštela	Senj
14:20 CEST		Report		Stadium: Sportska dvorana Senj; Attendance: 300; Referee: Igor Prpić i Bruno Štefančić (Rijeka, Croatia)

29 August 2015 Final	Zamet	21:16	Buzet	Senj
18:00 CEST		Report		Stadium: Sportska dvorana Senj; Attendance: 300; Referee: Igor Prpić i Bruno Štefančić (Rijeka, Croatia)

== Statistics ==
=== Appearances and goals ===
Number	Position	Player	Apps	Goals	Apps	Goals	Apps	Goals	Apps	Goals
Number	Position	Player	Total		Dukat Premier League		Croatian Cup		Other Matches	
1	GK	(Croatia) Marin Đurica	42	0	34	0	2	0	6	0
2	RW	(Croatia) Antonio Vozila	5	0	5	0	0	0	0	0
3	CB	(Croatia) Dino Islamović	9	9	6	3	0	0	3	6
4	LW	(Croatia) Mateo Hrvatin	40	161	33	140	2	3	5	18
5	RB	(Croatia) Marko Mrakovčić	7	4	5	4	0	0	2	0
6	RW	(Croatia) Dario Černeka	18	91	15	73	0	0	3	18
7	LP	(Croatia) Milan Uzelac	35	19	29	15	2	0	5	3
8	LB	(Croatia) Bojan Lončarić	41	92	34	73	2	9	5	9
9	LW	(Croatia) Viktor Stipčić	23	32	16	15	2	6	5	9
10	RB	(Croatia) Patrik Martinović	7	13	7	13	0	0	0	0
11	RW	(Croatia) Filip Glavaš	28	107	24	92	2	12	2	3
12	GK	(Croatia) Korado Juričić	5	0	3	0	1	0	1	0
12	GK	(Croatia) Frano Lučin	5	0	4	0	0	0	1	0
13	RB	(Croatia) Luka Kovačević	39	110	33	97	2	8	4	5
14	CB	(Croatia) Matija Golik	40	82	35	75	2	3	3	4
15	LB	(Croatia) Petar Jelušić	40	147	34	136	2	5	4	7
16	GK	(Croatia) Dino Slavić	41	0	34	0	2	0	5	0
17	CB	(Croatia) Raul Valković	39	104	33	83	2	6	4	15
18	CB	(Croatia) Paulo Grozdek	20	26	16	19	1	2	3	5
19	CB	(Croatia) Ivan Majić	11	14	9	13	2	1	0	0
19	LP	(Croatia) Veron Načinović	2	1	2	1	0	0	0	0
20	LP	(Croatia) Jadranko Stojanović	41	113	35	100	2	8	4	5
23	LB	(Croatia) David Miličević	14	12	12	11	1	0	1	1
		(Croatia) Filip Begić	2	3	2	3	0	0	0	0
		(Croatia) Gordan Broznić	1	0	1	0	0	0	0	0
		(Croatia) Noa Trubić	3	8	3	8	0	0	0	0
		(Croatia) Matija Starčević	1	1	1	1	0	0	0	0
		(Croatia) Marijan Klić	1	0	0	0	1	0	0	0

Source: League Squad

=== Goalkeepers ===
No	Name	Gms.	Av.S.	Saves	%	Wing	%	7m	%	9m	%	6m	%	Brkt.	%	FB	%
1	Marin Đurica	34 (33)	5,97	203/620	33%	41/104	39%	16/70	23%	110/231	48%	21/143	15%	6/28	21%	9/44	20%
12	Korado Juričić	7 (3)	0,29	2/8	25%	1/1	100%	0/2	0%	1/3	33%	0/2	0%	0/0	0%	0/0	0%
12	Fran Lučin	5 (4) 1,80	9/45	20%	2/9	22%	0/6	0%	4/	29%	2/12	17%	0/1	0%	1/3	33%	
16	Dino Slavić	34 (34)	6,85	233/682	34%	37/129	29%	15/75	20%	119/247	48%	43/157	27%	2/14	14%	17/60	28%

Source: League Squad

== Transfers ==
=== In ===
Date	Position	Player	From	To
12 Aug 2015	LP	(Croatia) Jadranko Stojanović	(Croatia) Buzet	Zamet
20 Aug 2015	LW	(Croatia) Mateo Hrvatin	(Croatia) Crikvenica	Zamet
20 Feb 2016	LB	(Croatia) David Miličević	(Qatar) Al Sadd	Zamet

=== Out ===
Date	Position	Player	From	To
1 Aug 2015	LW	(Croatia) Damir Vučko	Zamet	Retired
20 Jan 2016	RW	(Croatia) Antonio Vozila	Pećine	(Croatia) Kozala
