= 2013–14 RK Zamet season =

Zamet Rijeka
2013–14 season
- President: Zlatko Kolić
- Coach: Marin Mišković
- Venue: Centar Zamet
- Dukat Premier League: 8th
- Croatian Cup: Quarter-final
- Top goalscorer: Josip Jurić-Grgić (141)
- Highest home attendance: 600 vs (Croatia) Buzet (1 Mar 2014 - Centar Zamet)
- Lowest home attendance: 50 vs (Croatia) Mladi Rudar (28 Aug 2013 - Dvorana Dinko Lukarić)
- Average home league attendance: 500
Home colours	Away colours

The 2013–14 season was the 57th season in RK Zamet's history. It is their 6th successive season in the Dukat Premier League, and 36th successive top tier season.

== First team squad ==
Goalkeeper

- 1 (Croatia) Korado Juričić
- 12 (Croatia) Dino Slavić
- 16 (Croatia) Matko Vukić

Wingers
RW

- 3 (Croatia) Sandro Samardžić
- 6 (Croatia) Dario Černeka

LW

- 2 (Croatia) Damir Vučko
- 4 (Croatia) Marijan Klić
- 9 (Croatia) Viktor Stipčić

Line players

- 7 (Croatia) Milan Uzelac (captain)
- 10 (Croatia) Tomislav Karaula
- 20 (Croatia) Jadranko Stojanović

Back players
LB

- 8 (Croatia) Bojan Lončarić
- 11 (Croatia) Josip Jurić-Grgić

CB

- 17 (Croatia) Raul Valković
- 18 (Croatia) Matija Golik

RB

- 5 (Croatia) Luka Mrakovčić
- 13 (Croatia) Luka Kovačević

=== Injured ===
- (Croatia) Marin Đurica

=== Technical staff ===
- (Croatia) President: Zlatko Kolić
- (Croatia) Sports director: Alvaro Načinović
- (Croatia) Head Coach: Marin Mišković
- (Croatia) Assistant Coach: Valter Matošević
- (Croatia) Goalkeeper Coach: Valter Matošević
- (Croatia) Fitness Coach: Ante Kapova
- (Croatia) Tehniko: Williams Černeka

== Competitions ==
=== Overall ===
Competition	First match	Last match	Starting round	Final position	Record							
Competition	First match	Last match	Starting round	Final position	G	W	D	L	GF	GA	GD	Win %
Dukat Premier League - Regular season	7 September 2013	12 April 2014	Matchday 1	6th	26	15	0	11	735	696	+39	57.69
Dukat Premier League - Play-offs	23 April 2014	21 May 2014	Matchday 1	8th	12	6	0	6	343	318	+25	50.00
Croatian Cup	17 March 2014	9 April 2014	Round of 16	Quarter-final	2	1	0	1	49	64	−15	50.00
Total					40	22	0	18	1,127	1,078	+49	55.00

== Dukat Premier League ==
=== League table ===
Pos.	Team	Pld.	W	D	L	Goal+	Goal-	Pts.	Qualification or relegation
1.	Varaždin	26	23	2	1	861	677	48	Championship play-offs
2.	Poreč	26	19	1	6	745	679	39	Championship play-offs
3.	Karlovac	26	15	4	7	729	672	34	Championship play-offs
4.	Dubrava	26	15	1	10	795	762	31	Championship play-offs
5.	Umag	26	15	0	11	704	659	30	Mid-table play-offs
6.	Zamet	26	15	0	11	735	696	30	Mid-table play-offs
7.	Marina Kaštela	26	15	0	11	709	703	30	Mid-table play-offs
8.	Spačva	26	12	1	13	671	701	25	Mid-table play-offs
9.	Bjelovar	26	11	2	13	744	766	24	Relegation play-offs
10.	Buzet	26	10	2	14	691	712	22	Relegation play-offs
11.	Gorica	26	9	1	16	708	721	19	Relegation play-offs
12.	Đakovo	26	8	0	18	700	768	16	Relegation play-offs
13.	Medveščak NFD	26	3	2	21	668	804	8	Relegation play-offs
14.	Moslavina	26	4	0	22	649	789	8	Relegation play-offs

=== Matches ===
7 September 2013 1	Varaždin 1930	32:24	Zamet	Varaždin, Croatia
19:00 CEST		Report		Stadium: Gradska Dvorana Varaždin; Attendance: 400; Referee: Gladović & Olenik (Virovitica, Croatia)

14 September 2013 2	Zamet	31:23	Đakovo	Rijeka
19:00 CEST		Report		Stadium: Dvorana Dinko Lukarić; Attendance: 200; Referee: Siniša Bosak & Željko Herceg (Varaždin, Croatia)

22 September 2013 3	Poreč	26:23	Zamet	Poreč
19:00 CEST		Report		Stadium: SRC Veli Jože; Attendance: 500; Referee: Igor Barle & Saša Vučić (Zagreb, Croatia)

28 September 2013 4	Zamet	31:23	Marina Kaštela	Rijeka
17:00 CEST		Report		Stadium: Dvorana Dinko Lukarić; Attendance: 200; Referee: Robert Kober (Zagreb, Croatia) & Igor Sunajko (Dugo Selo, Croatia)

5 October 2013 5	Spačva	22:20	Zamet	Vinkovci
19:00 CEST		Report		Stadium: ŠSD Bartol Kašić; Attendance: 200; Referee: Josip Cepanec (Turčin, Croatia) & Ranko Jeftić (Varaždin, Croatia)

12 October 2013 6	Zamet	26:24	Dubrava	Rijeka
19:00 CEST		Report		Stadium: Centar Zamet; Attendance: 300; Referee: Ivan Klapež & Ivan Pervan (Trilj, Croatia)

19 October 2013 7	Buzet	23:26	Zamet	Buzet
19:00 CEST		Report		Stadium: SD Buzet; Attendance: 200; Referee: Ivica Glavinić & Mile Veraja (Metković, Croatia)

26 October 2013 8	Zamet	30:27	Bjelovar	Rijeka
18:00 CEST		Report		Stadium: Centar Zamet; Attendance: 200; Referee: Josip Cepanec (Tomaševac, Croatia) & Ranko Jeftić (Varaždin, Croatia)

6 November 2013 9	Gorica	26:29	Zamet	Velika Gorica
18:00 CEST		Report		Stadium: GD Velika Gorica; Attendance: 300; Referee: Robert Kober & Igor Sunajko (Zagreb, Croatia)

9 November 2013 10	Zamet	29:23	Medveščak	Rijeka
18:00 CEST		Report		Stadium: Centar Zamet; Attendance: 400; Referee: Ante Pavić & Mate Torbarina (Zadar, Croatia)

17 November 2013 11	Moslavina	26:29	Zamet	Kutina
18:00 CEST		Report		Stadium: SC Kutina; Attendance: 200; Referee: Ivan Klapež & Ivan Pervan (Trilj, Croatia)

23 November 2013 12	Zamet	26:27	Umag	Rijeka
18:00 CEST		Report		Stadium: Centar Zamet; Attendance: 500; Referee: Matija Gubica (Petrijevci, Croatia) i Boris Milošević (Osijek, Croatia)

30 November 2013 13	Karlovac	35:32	Zamet	Karlovac
18:00 CEST		Report		Stadium: Dvorana Mladost; Attendance: 300; Referee: Tomislav Cindrić & Robert Gonzurek (Osijek, Croatia)

7 December 2013 14	Zamet	35:38	Varaždin 1930	Rijeka
18:00 CEST		Report		Stadium: Centar Zamet; Attendance: 300; Referee: Ante Pavić & Mate Torbarina (Zadar, Croatia)

14 December 2013 15	Đakovo	25:30	Zamet	Đakovo
19:00 CEST		Report		Stadium: GNSD Đakovo; Attendance: 200; Referee: Vanja Banović i Vedran Banović (Požega, Croatia)

1 February 2014 16	Zamet	28:29	Poreč	Rijeka
18:00 CEST		Report		Stadium: Centar Zamet; Attendance: 400; Referee: Josip Cepanec (Turčin, Croatia) i Zoran Jeftić (Varaždin, Croatia)

9 February 2014 17	Marina Kaštela	31:26	Zamet	Kaštel Sućurac
18:00 CEST		Report		Stadium: SD Sokolana; Attendance: 200; Referee: Ante Pavić & Mate Torbarina (Zadar, Croatia)

15 February 2014 18	Zamet	33:23	Spačva	Rijeka
18:00 CEST		Report		Stadium: Centar Zamet; Attendance: 200; Referee: Igor Barle & Saša Vučić (Zagreb, Croatia)

22 February 2014 19	Dubrava	33:29	Zamet	Zagreb
17:00 CEST		Report		Stadium: ŠD Dubrava; Attendance: 300; Referee: Dalibor Jurinović (Zadar, Croatia) & Marko Mrvica (Biograd, Croatia

1 March 2014 20	Zamet	33:29	Buzet	Rijeka
19:00 CEST		Report		Stadium: Centar Zamet; Attendance: 600; Referee: Ivan Klapež & Ivan Pervan (Trilj, Croatia)

8 March 2014 21	Bjelovar	36:33	Zamet	Bjelovar
19:00 CEST		Report		Stadium: SŠD Bjelovar; Attendance: 200; Referee: Josip Cepanec (Turčin, Croatia) i Zoran Jeftić (Varaždin, Croatia)

15 March 2014 22	Zamet	33:26	Gorica	Rijeka
16:00 CEST		Report		Stadium: Centar Zamet; Attendance: 100; Referee: Ivan Klapež & Ivan Pervan (Trilj, Croatia)

23 March 2014 23	Medveščak	23:35	Zamet	Zagreb
16:00 CEST		Report		Stadium: ŠD Sutinska vrela Attendance: 200; Referee: Dalibor Jurinović (Zadar, Croatia) & Marko Mrvica (Biograd, Croatia

29 March 2014 24	Zamet	26:22	Moslavina	Rijeka
16:00 CEST		Report		Stadium: Centar Zamet; Attendance: 100; Referee: Marko Lovrić (Zagreb, Croatia) i Siniša Tanasić (Dugo Selo, Croatia)

10 April 2014 25	Umag	28:22	Zamet	Umag
20:00 CEST		Report		Stadium: ŠD Marije i Line; Attendance: 200; Referee: Ivan Klapež & Ivan Pervan (Trilj, Croatia)

12 April 2014 26	Zamet	22:20	Karlovac	Rijeka
18:00 CEST		Report		Stadium: Centar Zamet; Attendance: 100; Referee: Igor Barle & Saša Vučić (Zagreb, Croatia)

=== Play-offs table ===
Pos.	Team	Pld.	W	D	L	Goal+	Goal-	Pts.	Place
1.	Umag	12	8	0	4	333	318	16	7th
2.	Zamet	12	6	0	6	343	318	12	8th
3.	Marina Kaštela	12	6	0	6	313	325	12	9th
4.	Spačva	12	4	0	8	320	348	8	10th

=== Matches ===
23 April 2014 1	Marna Kaštela	27:31	Zamet	Kaštel Sućurac
18:00 CEST		Report		Stadium: SD Sokolana; Attendance: 200; Referee: Marko Lovrić (Zagreb, Croatia) i Siniša Tanasić (Dugo Selo, Croatia)

25 April 2014 2	Zamet	39:31	Spačva	Rijeka
18:00 CEST		Report		Stadium: Centar Zamet; Attendance: 200; Referee: Igor Hunjadi & Marijo Zečević (Zagreb, Croatia)

30 April 2014 3	Umag	31:30	Zamet	Umag
18:00 CEST		Report		Stadium: Školska dvorana Umag; Attendance: 200; Referee: Dalibor Jurinović (Zadar, Croatia) i Marko Mrvica (Biograd, Croatia)

30 April 2014 4	Zamet	35:25	Marina Kaštela	Rijeka
18:00 CEST		Report		Stadium: Centar Zamet; Attendance: 250; Referee: Dalibor Jurinović (Zadar, Croatia) i Marko Mrvica (Biograd, Croatia)

15 May 2014 5	Zamet	32:28	Umag	Rijeka
18:00 CEST		Report		Stadium: Centar Zamet; Attendance: 100; Referee: Ante Pavić & Mate Torbarina (Zadar, Croatia)

21 May 2014 6	Spačva	22:27	Zamet	Rijeka
19:00 CEST		Report		Stadium: Centar Zamet; Attendance: 100; Referee: Igor Brale & Saša Vučić (Zagreb, Croatia)

=== Matches ===
17 March 2014 Round of 16	Zamet	29:27	Spačva	Rijeka
19:00 CEST		Report		Stadium: Centar Zamet; Attendance: 100; Referee: Igor Brale & Saša Vučić (Zagreb, Croatia)

9 April 2014 Quarter-final	NEXE	37:20	Zamet	Našice
19:00 CEST		Report		Stadium: Dvorana Kralja Tomislava; Attendance: 300; Referee: Igor Emanović & Zoran Mikić (Štivica, Croatia)

=== Friendlies ===
28 August 2013 Friendly	Zamet	27:23	Mladi Rudar	Rijeka
17:00 CEST		Report		Stadium: Centar Zamet; Attendance: 50; Referee: ?

== Transfers ==
=== In ===
Date	Position	Player	From	To
10 Aug 2013	LW	(Croatia) Viktor Stipčić	(Croatia) Kozala	Zamet
19 Sep 2013	LB	(Croatia) Josip Jurić-Grgić	(Croatia) Zagreb CO	Zamet

=== Out ===
Date	Position	Player	From	To
31 Jul 2013	RB	(Croatia) Marin Kružić	Zamet	Nexe
31 Jul 2013	LP	(Croatia) Marin Sakić	Zamet	(Croatia) Nexe
16 Aug 2013	LW	(Croatia) Mateo Hrvatin	Zamet	Crikvenica
4 May 2014	LB	Josip Jurić-Grgić	Zamet	Dubrava
