= 2016–17 RK Zamet season =

Zamet Rijeka
2016–17 season
- President: Vedran Devčić
- Coach: Marin Mišković (until 3 Mar 2017); Igor Marijanović (from 3 Mar 2017)
- Venue: Centar Zamet
- Dukat Premier League: 9th
- Croatian Cup: Round of 16
- EHF Cup: QR 3
- Top goalscorer: League: Marin Kružić – 115 goals All: Marin Kružić – 147 goals
- Highest home attendance: 2,100 vs Melsungen (19 November 2016 - Centar Zamet)
- Lowest home attendance: 100 vs Poreč (20 May 2017 - Centar Zamet)
Home colours	Away colours

The 2016–17 season was the 60th season in RK Zamet’s history. It is their 9th successive season in the Dukat Premier League, and 39th successive top tier season.

== First team squad ==
Source: eurohandball.com

Goalkeeper

- 1 (Croatia) Marin Đurica
- 12 (Croatia) Fran Lučin
- 16 (Croatia) Marin Sorić

Wingers
RW

- 5 (Croatia) Patrik Martinović
- 11 (Croatia) Filip Glavaš

LW

- 2 (Croatia) Dario Jeličić
- 4 (Croatia) Mateo Hrvatin (vice-captain)
- 20 (Croatia) Noa Tubić

Line players

- 6 (Croatia) David Šunjić
- 7 (Croatia) Milan Uzelac (captain)
- 8 (Croatia) Tin Lučin
- 10 (Croatia) Jadranko Stojanović
- 19 (Croatia) Ivan Majić

Back players
LB

- 21 (Croatia) Veron Načinović

CB

- 14 (Croatia) Matija Golik
- 17 (Croatia) Raul Valković
- 22 (Croatia) Marko Mrakovčić
- 23 (Croatia) Paulo Grozdek

RB

- 9 (Croatia) Matija Starčević
- 15 (Croatia) Marin Kružić

=== Loans ===
- (Croatia) Dario Pešić (to RK Kozala)

=== Left during season ===
LW

- (Croatia) Viktor Stipčić

LB

- (Croatia) David Miličević
- (Croatia) Petar Jelušić

=== Technical staff ===
- (Croatia) President: Vedran Devčić
- (Croatia) Sports director: Vedran Babić
- (Croatia) Head Coach: Marin Mišković (until March 3)
- (Croatia) Head Coach: Igor Marijanović (from March 3)
- (Croatia) Assistant Coach: Valter Matošević (until March 3)
- (Croatia) Assistant Coach: Vedran Babić (from March 3)
- (Croatia) Goalkeeper Coach: Valter Matošević (until March 3)
- (Croatia) Fitness Coach: Dragan Marijanović
- (Croatia) Tehniko: Williams Černeka

== Competitions ==
=== Overall ===
Competition	First match	Last match	Starting round	Final position	Record							
Competition	First match	Last match	Starting round	Final position	G	W	D	L	GF	GA	GD	Win %
Dukat Premier League - Regular season	24 September 2016	1 April 2017	Matchday 1	6th	18	8	3	7	543	539	+4	44.44
Dukat Premier League - Play-offs	8 April 2017	3 June 2017	Matchday 1	3rd	10	4	1	5	293	285	+8	40.00
Croatian Cup	8 February 2017	8 February 2017	Round of 16	Round of 16	1	0	0	1	29	32	−3	0.00
EHF Cup	2 September 2016	26 November 2016	QR1	QR3	6	2	0	4	149	172	−23	33.33
Total					35	14	4	17	1,014	1,028	−14	40.00

Last updated: 3 June 2017.

== EHF Cup ==
=== Qualification stage ===
2 September 2016 QR1	Créteil (France)	29:32	(Croatia) Zamet Rijeka	Créteil, France
20:30 CEST (UTC+02:00)		Report		Stadium: Palais des Sports Robert Oubron; Attendance: 1,200; Referee: Daniel Freitas & Cesar Carvalho (Portugal)

10 September 2016 QR1	Zamet Rijeka (Croatia)	24:27 (56:56 agg.)	(France) Créteil	Rijeka, Croatia
20:30 CEST (UTC+02:00)		Report		Stadium: Centar Zamet; Attendance: 1,300; Referee: Ferenc Bonifert & Viktor Oláh (Hungary)

8 October 2016 QR2	CSM București (Romania)	29:23	(Croatia) Zamet Rijeka	Bucharest, Romania
12:30 CEST (UTC+02:00)		Report		Stadium: Polyvalent Hall; Attendance: 650; Referee: Vagif Aliyev & Alekper Alghakishiyev (Azerbaijan)

15 October 2016 QR2	Zamet Rijeka (Croatia)	27:21 (50:50 agg.)	(Romania) CSM București	Rijeka, Croatia
12:00 CEST (UTC+02:00)		Report		Stadium: Centar Zamet; Attendance: 1,500; Referee: Konstantinos Katsikis & Michalis Michailidis (Greece)

19 November 2016 QR3	Zamet Rijeka (Croatia)	23:34	(Germany) MT Melsungen	Rijeka, Croatia
19:00 CEST (UTC+02:00)		Report		Stadium: Centar Zamet; Attendance: 2100; Referee: Mads Dahl Hermann & Jesper Madsen Denmark

26 November 2016 QR3	MT Melsungen (Germany)	32:20 (66:43 agg.)	(Croatia) RK Zamet	Kassel, Germany
CEST (UTC+02:00)		Report		Stadium: Rothenbach-Halle; Attendance: 2150; Referee: Georgios Panayides & Marios Andreou (Cyprus)

Updated to match(es) played on 26 November 2016. Source: eurohandball.com

== Dukat Premier League ==
=== League table ===
Pos.	Team	Pld.	W	D	L	Goal+	Goal-	+/-	Pts.	Qualification or relegation
1.	Dubrava Zagreb	18	10	3	5	579	545	+34	23	Championship play-offs
2.	Umag	18	11	1	6	518	478	+40	23	Championship play-offs
3.	Spačva Vinkovci	18	11	0	7	561	525	+36	22	Championship play-offs
4.	Gorica	18	9	4	5	514	495	+19	22	Championship play-offs
5.	Poreč	18	9	3	6	500	490	+10	21	Relegation play-offs
6.	Zamet Rijeka	18	8	3	7	543	539	+4	19	Relegation play-offs
7.	Varaždin 1930	18	5	5	8	520	515	+5	15	Relegation play-offs
8.	Rudar Rude	18	7	1	10	479	531	-52	15	Relegation play-offs
9.	Metalac Zagreb	18	5	1	12	510	554	-44	11	Relegation play-offs
10.	Ribola Kaštela	18	4	1	13	473	525	-52	9	Relegation play-offs

Updated to match(es) played on 2 April 2017. Source: Premier league Reultati.com

=== Matches ===
24 September 2016 1	Poreč	30:27	Zamet	Poreč
18:30 CEST		Report		Stadium: SRC Veli Jože; Attendance: 250; Referee: Igor Barle i Saša Vučić (Zagreb)

29 September 2016 2	Zamet	31:31	Dubrava	Rijeka
18:00 CEST		Report		Stadium: Centar Zamet; Attendance: 150; Referee: Matija Gubica (Petrijevci) & Boris Milošević (Osijek)

12 October 2016 3	Metalac	31:28	Zamet	Zagreb
19:30 CEST		Report		Stadium: ŠD Sutinska vrela Attendance: 150; Referee: Ante Pavić & Mate Torbarina (Zadar)

19 October 2016 4	Zamet	35:28	Ribola Kaštela	Rijeka
18:00 CEST		Report		Stadium: Centar Zamet; Attendance: 400; Referee: Matija Gubica (Petrijevci) & Boris Milošević (Osijeka)

22 October 2016 5	Rudar	25:28	Zamet	Rude
17:00 CEST		Report		Stadium: Dvorana OŠ Rude; Attendance: 200; Referee: Dražen Gladović & Goran Volenik (Virovitica)

29 October 2016 6	Zamet	35:28	Gorica	Rijeka
18:00 CEST		Report		Stadium: Centar Zamet; Attendance: 400; Referee: Ante Pavić & Mate Torbarina (Zadar)

12 November 2016 7	Umag	36:27	Zamet	Umag
19:00 CEST		Report		Stadium: ŠD Marije i Line; Attendance: 350; Referee: Robert Kober (Zagreb) & Igor Sunajko (Dugo Selo)

23 November 2016 8	Spačva Vinkovci	37:30	Zamet	Vinkovci
17:00 CEST		Report		Stadium: SD Bartol Kašić

30 November 2016 9	Zamet	29:29	Varaždin 1930	Rijeka
18:00 CEST		Report		Stadium: Centar Zamet; Attendance: 140; Referee: Igor Emanović & Zoran Mikić (Štivice)

3 December 2016 10	Zamet	38:27	Poreč	Rijeka
18:00 CEST		Report		Stadium: Centar Zamet; Attendance: 100; Referee: Davor Lončar & Zoran Lončar (Varaždin)

12 February 2017 11	Dubrava	43:30	Zamet	Zagreb
18:00 CEST		Report		Stadium: ŠD Dubrava; Attendance: 150; Referee: Matija Gubica (Petrijevci) & Boris Milošević (Osijek)

18 February 2017 12	Zamet	31:33	Metalac	Rijeka
19:00 CEST		Report		Stadium: Centar Zamet; Attendance: 200; Referee: Davor Lončar & Zoran Lončar (Varaždin)

26 February 2017 13	Ribola Kaštela	30:22	Zamet	Kaštel Sućurac
18:00 CEST		Report		Stadium: Gradska dvorana Kaštela; Attendance: 200; Referee: Ivan Grbavac (Makarska) & Siniša Ravlić (Vrgorac)

5 March 2017 14	Zamet	35:24	Rudar	Rijeka
16:00 CEST		Report		Stadium: Centar Zamet; Attendance: 210; Referee: Matija Gubica (Petrijevci) & Boris Milošević (Osijek)

11 March 2017 15	Gorica	30:30	Zamet	Velika Gorica
19:00 CEST		Report		Stadium: Dvorana srednjih škola Attendance: 100; Referee: Dražen Gladović & Goran Volenik (Virovitica)

18 March 2017 16	Zamet	31:24	Umag	Rijeka
17:00 CEST		Report		Stadium: Centar Zamet; Attendance: 200; Referee: Tomislav Cindrić & Robert Gonzurek (Osijek)

25 March 2017 17	Zamet	28:27	Spačva Vinkovci	Rijeka
17:00 CEST		Report		Stadium: Centar Zamet; Attendance: 100; Referee: Siniša Bosak & Željko Herceg (Varaždin)

1 April 2017 18	Varaždin 1930	26:28	Zamet	Varaždin
19:00 CEST		Report		Stadium: Varaždin Arena; Attendance: 200; Referee: Ivica Glavinić & Mile Veraja (Metković)

Updated to match(es) played on 1 April 2017. Source: Premier league SportCom.hr

=== League table ===
Pos.	Team	Pld.	W	D	L	Goal+	Goal-	+/-	Pts.	Qualification or relegation
1.	Poreč	28	14	3	11	785	788	-3	31	Dukat Premier League
2.	Varaždin 1930	28	12	5	11	816	794	+22	29	Dukat Premier League
3.	Zamet	28	12	4	12	836	824	+12	28	Dukat Premier League
4.	Metalac Zagreb	28	12	1	15	820	837	-17	25	Dukat Premier League
5.	Rudar Rude	28	10	1	17	736	810	-74	21	Relegation to Prva HRL
6.	Ribola Kaštela	28	7	2	19	748	817	-69	16	Relegation to Prva HRL

This table contains statistics combined with the regular part of the Dukat Premier League. Source: SportCom.hr

=== Matches ===
8 April 2017 1	Zamet	32:26	Metalac Zagreb	Rijeka
16:00 CEST		Report		Stadium: Centar Zamet; Attendance: 100; Referee: Siniša Bosak & Željko Herceg (Varaždin)

19 April 2017 2	Poreč	27:26	Zamet	Poreč
19:00 CEST		[ Report]		Stadium: SRC Veli Jože

22 April 2017 3	Zamet	30:30	Ribola Kaštela	Rijeka
19:00 CEST		Report		Stadium: Centar Zamet; Attendance: 100; Referee: Matija Gubica & Boris Milošević (Osijek)

29 April 2017 4	Zamet	31:33	Varaždin 1930	Rijeka
19:00 CEST		Report		Stadium: Centar Zamet; Attendance: 100; Referee: Igor Barle & Saša Vučić (Zagreb)

10 May 2017 5	Rudar Rude	21:20	Zamet	Rude
20:00 CEST		Report		Stadium: Dvorana OŠ Rude; Attendance: 200; Referee: Tomislav Cindrić & Robert Gonzurek (Osijek)

17 May 2017 6	Zamet	35:28	Metalac Zagreb	Zagreb
18:00 CEST		Report		Stadium: ŠD Sutinska vrela Attendance: 150; Referee: Davor Lončar & Zoran Lončar (Varaždin)

23 May 2017 7	Zamet	35:25	Poreč	Rijeka
18:00 CEST		Report		Stadium: Centar Zamet; Attendance: 100; Referee: Robert Kober (Zagreb) & Igor Sunajko (Dugo Selo)

27 May 2017 8	Ribola Kaštela	29:31	Zamet	Kaštel Sućurac
18:00 CEST		Report		Stadium: Gradska Dvorana Kaštela; Attendance: 100

31 May 2017 9	Varaždin 1930	32:28	Zamet	Varaždin
18:00 CEST		Report		Stadium: Varaždin Arena; Attendance: 150

3 June 2017 10	Zamet	32:27	Rudar Rude	Rijeka
CEST		Report		Stadium: Centar Zamet; Attendance: 150; Referee: Dražen Gladović & Goran Volenik (Virovitica)

Updated to match(es) played on 3 June 2017. Source: SportCom.hr

== Croatian Cup ==
=== Matches ===
8 February 2017 Round of 16	Vidovec	32:29	Zamet	Vidovec
19:00 CEST		Report		Stadium: OŠ Vidovec; Attendance: 500

Updated to match(es) played on 5 March 2017. Source: sportcom.hr

== Friendly matches ==
=== Pre-season ===
11 August 2016 Friendly	Zamet (Croatia)	28:24	(Slovenia) RD Koper 2013	Rijeka
19:30 CEST		Report		Stadium: Centar Zamet; Attendance: 200

Updated to match(es) played on 5 March 2017. Source: sportcom.hr

=== Memorial Zvonimir Škerl ===
14 January 2017 Semi-final	Zamet (Croatia)	30:34	(Slovenia) Riko Ribnica	Rijeka
11:00 CEST		Report		Stadium: Dvorana Dinko Lukarić; Attendance: 500; Referee: Robert Berbonić & Nikša Kalčić (Rijeka)

14 January 2017 Third place match	Zamet	35:29	Kozala	Rijeka
CEST		Report		Stadium: Dvorana Dinko Lukarić; Attendance: 300; Referee: Robert Berbonić & Nikša Kalčić (Rijeka)

Updated to match(es) played on 5 March 2017. Source: sportcom.hr

=== Mid-season ===
25 January 2017 Friendly	Zamet	25:21	Buzet	Rijeka
18:00 CET (UTC+01:00)		[ Report]		Stadium: Centar Zamet

27 January 2017 Friendly	Zamet	34:26	Kozala	Rijeka
17:00 CET (UTC+01:00)		[ Report]		Stadium: Centar Zamet

Updated to match(es) played on 5 March 2017. Source: sportcom.hr

== Premier League statistics ==
=== Shooting ===
No	Pos	Name	Gms.	Av.g.	Sht	%	Wing	%	7m	%	9m	%	6m	%	Brkt.	%	FB	%	
1	GK	Marin Đurica	27 (27)	0,07	2/3	67%	0/0	0%	0/0	0%	0/0	0%	0/0	0%	0/0	0%	2/3	67%	
2	LW	Dario Jeličić	9 (4)	2,00	14/11	75%	6/8	80%	0/0	0%	0/0	0%	1/1	100%	0/0	0%	2/2	100%	
3	LB	Petar Jelušić	5 (5)	2,00	10/18	56%	0/0	0%	0/0	0%	7/15	47%	3/3	100%	0/	0%	0/0	0%	
4	LW	Mateo Hrvatin	23 (19)	3,61	83/110	75%	41/61	67%	1/1	100%	1/1	100%	8/10	80%	7/8	88%	25/29	86%	
5	RW	Patrik Martinović	22 (14)	1,00	18/31	58%	6/12	50%	1/1	100%	5/7	71%	1/5	20%	2/2	100%	3/4	75%	
6	LP	David Šunjić	22 (9)	0,27	6/10	60%	2/3	67%	0/1	0%	3/5	60%	0/0	0%	1/1	100%	0/0	0%	
7	LP	Milan Uzelac	21 (18)	0,62	13/17	76%	0/0	0%	1/1	100%	2/2	100%	8/11	73%	1/1	100%	1/2	50%	
8	LP	Tin Lučin	24 (24)	5,40	121/201	95/160	59%	0/3	0%	32/42	76%	30/69	43%	28/40	70%	2/2	100%	3/4	75%
9	LW	Viktor Stipčić	8 (3)	0,25	2/3	67%	0/0	0%	0/0	0%	1/1	100%	0/1	0%	1/1	100%	0/0	0%	
9	CB	Matija Starčević	5 (1)	0,20	1/1	100%	0/0	0%	0/0	0%	0/0	0%	1/1	100%	0/0	0%	0/0	0%	
10	LP	Jadranko Stojanović	27 (25)	2,96	80/113	71%	1/1	100%	0/0	0%	1/10	10%	70/92	76%	4/5	80%	4/5	80%	
11	RW	Filip Glavaš	23 (22)	4,26	98/153	64%	40/70	57%	27/39	69%	2/3	67%	14/16	88%	5/7	71%	10/18	56%	
12	GK	Fran Lučin	16 (9)	0,50	4/7	57%	0/0	0%	1/1	100%	1/4	25%	2/2	100%	0/0	0%	0/0	0%	
13	LB	Veron Načinović	6 (5)	1,25	7/8	90%	0/0	0%	0/0	0%	0/0	0%	7/8	90%	1/1	100%	0/0	0%	
14	CB	Matija Golik	27 (27)	69/117	59%	0/2	0%	12/17	71%	26/59	44%	28/35	0/0	0%	3/4	75%			
15	RB	Marin Kružić	26 (25)	4,42	115/206	56%	0/0	0%	1/1	100%	88/171	51%	22/29	76%	2/3	67%	2/2	100%	
16	GK	Dario Pešić	8 (5)	0,00	0/0	0%	0/0	0%	0/0	0%	0/0	0%	0/0	0%	0/0	0%	0/0	0%	
16	GK	Marin Sorić	17 (16)	0,00	0/0	0%	0/0	0%	0/0	0%	0/0	0%	0/0	0%	0/0	0%	0/0	0%	
17	CB	Raul Valković	22 (21)	2,50	55/87	63%	8/15	53%	0/0	0%	23/43	53%	15/17	88%	3/4	75%	6/8	75%	
18	CB	Paulo Grozdek	22 (11)	1,18	26/51	51%	0/0	0%	0/0	0%	16/38	42%	6/9	67%	3/3	100%	1/1	100%	
19	LP	Ivan Majić	25 (13)	1,36	34/43	79%	0/0	0%	0/0	0%	5/6	83%	24/32	75%	2/2	100%	3/3	100%	
20	LW	Noa Tubić	2 (0)	0,00	0/0	0%	0/	0%	0/0	0%	0/0	0%	0/0	0%	0/0	0%	0/0	0%	
22	CB	Marko Mrakovčić	19 (12)	1,00	19/26	73%	2/4	50%	2/3	67%	3/5	60%	9/11	82%	2/2	100%	1/1	100%	
23	LB	David Miličević	10 (10)	3,20	32/59	54%	0/0	0%	0/0	0%	24/50	48%	7/7	100%	0/1	0%	1/1	100%	

Updated to match(es) played on 4 June 2017. Source: Premier league Rukometstat.com

=== Goalkeepers ===
No	Name	Gms.	Av.S.	Saves	%	Wing	%	7m	%	9m	%	6m	%	Brkt.	%	FB	%
1	Marin Đurica	17 (17)	11,41	194/644	30%	38/103	37%	18/62	29%	90/261	34%	33/158	21%	5/18	28%	10/42	24%
12	Fran Lučin	5 (4)	0,60	3/19	16%	1/4	25%	0/1	0%	2/12	17%	0/1	0%	0/0	0%	0/1	0%
16	Dario Pešić	8 (5)	0,13	1/21	5%	0/2	0%	0/2	0%	1/12	8%	0/1	0%	0/1	0%	0/3	0%
16	Marin Sorić	7 (5)	1,70	10/32	15%	1/3	30%	4/9	45%	3/9	30%	1/7	15%	0/2	0%	1/3	25%

Updated to match(es) played on 1 April 2017. Source: Premier league Rukometstat.com

=== Top goalscorers ===
No	Name	Gls	Avg	%
8	Tin Lučin	85/134	5,40	63%
15	Marin Kružić	70/124	4,38	56%
11	Filip Glavaš	63/101	4,20	62%
4	Mateo Hrvatin	61/77	4,07	79%
10	Jadranko Stojanović	58/83	3,41	70%
14	Matija Golik	43/73	2,53	59%
17	Raul Valković	40/64	2,50	63%
23	David Miličević	32/59	3,20	54%

Updated to match(es) played on 1 April 2017. Source: Premier league Rukometstat.com

=== 7m ===
No	Name	Gls	%
8	Tin Lučin	27/34	79,4%
11	Filip Glavaš	17/25	68,0%
14	Matija Golik	2/4	50%
5	Patrik Martinović	1/1	100%
22	Marko Mrakovčić	1/1	100%

Updated to match(es) played on 1 April 2017. Source: Premier league Rukometstat.com

=== Assists ===
No	Name	As	Av.
15	Marin Kružić	20	1,25
8	Tin Lučin	16	1,07
23	David Miličević	13	1,30
14	Matija Golik	10	0,59
17	Raul Valković	9	0,53
7	Milan Uzelac	5	0,31
10	Jadranko Stojanović	5	0,31
11	Filip Glavaš	4	0,29
6	David Šunjić	2	0,15
4	Mateo Hrvatin	2	0,14
13	Veron Načinović	1	1,00
9	Viktor Stipčić	1	0,13

Updated to match(es) played on 1 April 2017. Source: Premier league Rukometstat.com

=== Punishment drawn ===
No	Name	Drawn	Avg.
10	Jadranko Stojanović	13	0,76
23	David Miličević	6	0,60
14	Matija Golik	6	0,35
11	Filip Glavaš	3	0,21
8	Tin Lučin	3	0,20
15	Marin Kružić	3	0,19
7	Milan Uzelac	3	0,19
2	Dario Jeličić	1	1,00
18	Paulo Grozdek	1	0,08
6	David Šunjić	1	0,08
1	Marin Đurica	1	0,06
17	Raul Valković	1	0,06

Updated to match(es) played on 1 April 2017. Source: Premier league Rukometstat.com

=== 2m punishments ===
No	Name	2m	Avg.
7	Milan Uzelac	8	0,50
14	Matija Golik	8	0,47
15	Marin Kružić	7	0,44
10	Jadranko Stojanović	5	0,29
19	Ivan Majić	3	0,20
23	David Miličević	2	0,20

Updated to match(es) played on 1 April 2017. Source: Premier league Rukometstat.com

=== Yellow cards - Premier League ===
No	Name	Booked	Avg.
7	Milan Uzelac	12	0,75
15	Marin Kružić	6	0,38
11	Filip Glavaš	4	0,27
8	Tin Lučin	4	0,27
23	David Miličević	3	0,30
8	Jadranko Stojanović	3	0,19
14	Matija Golik	2	0,11
3	Petar Jelušić	1	0,09

Updated to match(es) played on 1 April 2017. Source: Premier league Rukometstat.com

=== Red cards ===
No	Name	Sent off (straight red)	Avg.
23	David Miličević	1	0,10

Updated to match(es) played on 26 March 2017. Source: Premier league Rukometstat.com

== Croatian Cup statistics ==
Number	Position	Player	Apps	Goals			
Number	Position	Player	3	LB	(Croatia) Petar Jelušić	1	2
4	LW	(Croatia) Mateo Hrvatin	1	3			
5	RW	(Croatia) Patrik Martinović	1	4			
6	LP	(Croatia) David Šunjić	1	0			
7	LP	(Croatia) Milan Uzelac	1	1			
8	LP	(Croatia) Tin Lučin	1	5			
10	LP	(Croatia) Jadranko Stojanović	1	6			
14	CB	(Croatia) Matija Golik	1	3			
15	RB	(Croatia) Marin Kružić	1	5			
16	GK	(Croatia) Marin Sorić	1	0			
17	CB	(Croatia) Raul Valković	1	0			
18	CB	(Croatia) Paulo Grozdek	1	0			
22	CB	(Croatia) Marko Mrakovčić	1	0			

Updated to match(es) played on 5 March 2017. Source: SportCom.hr

== EHF Cup statistics ==
=== Shooting ===
Number	Position	Player	Apps (Played)	Goals			
Number	Position	Player	3	LB	(Croatia) Petar Jelušić	1 (1)	0
4	LW	(Croatia) Mateo Hrvatin	6 (6)	22			
5	RW	(Croatia) Patrik Martinović	6 (4)	2			
6	LP	(Croatia) David Šunjić	3 (2)	2			
7	LP	(Croatia) Milan Uzelac	5 (5)	3			
8	LP	(Croatia) Tin Lučin	6 (6)	18			
9	LW	(Croatia) Viktor Stipčić	5 (2)	0			
10	LP	(Croatia) Jadranko Stojanović	6 (6)	12			
11	RW	(Croatia) Filip Glavaš	4 (4)	16			
13	RB	(Croatia) Matija Starčević	0 (0)	0			
14	CB	(Croatia) Matija Golik	6 (6)	10			
15	RB	(Croatia) Marin Kružić	6 (6)	27			
17	CB	(Croatia) Raul Valković	6 (6)	6			
18/23	LB	(Croatia) David Miličević	6 (6)	13			
18/11	CB	(Croatia) Paulo Grozdek	4 (4)	12			
19	LP	(Croatia) Ivan Majić	6 (5)	8			
20	LW	(Croatia) Noa Trubić	3 (0)	0			
21	LP	(Croatia) Veron Načinović	1 (0)	0			
22	CB	(Croatia) Marko Mrakovčić	0 (0)	0			

Updated to match(es) played on 10 February 2017. Source: Stats

=== Goalkeepers ===
Number	Position	Player	Apps (Played)	Saves			
Number	Position	Player	1	GK	(Croatia) Marin Đurica	6 (6)	61/160
12	GK	(Croatia) Fran Lučin	6 (3)	0/9			
16	GK	(Croatia) Dario Pešić	6 (3)	1/3			

Updated to match(es) played on 10 February 2017. Source: eurohandball.com

== Transfers ==
=== In ===
Date	Position	Player	From	To
10 May 2016	RB	(Croatia) Marin Kružić	(Croatia) Spačva	Zamet
7 July 2016	LP	(Croatia) Tin Lučin	(Croatia) Kozala	Zamet
6 November 2016	LB	(Croatia) Petar Jelušić	Retirement	Zamet
4 January 2016	GK	(Croatia) Marin Sorić	(Croatia) RK Umag	RK Zamet
4 January 2016	LW	(Croatia) Dario Jeličić	(Croatia) RK Kozala	RK Zamet

=== Out ===
Date	Position	Player	From	To
3 Aug 2016	GK	(Croatia) Dino Slavić	(Croatia) Zamet	Umag
3 Aug 2016	LB	(Croatia) Bojan Lončarić	(Croatia) Zamet	Released from contract
3 Aug 2016	LB	(Croatia) Petar Jelušić	(Croatia) Zamet	Retired
1 Sep 2016	RB	(Croatia) Luka Kovačević	(Croatia) Zamet	(Norway) ØIF Arendal
20 Sep 2016	RW	(Croatia) Dario Černeka	(Croatia) Zamet	Retired
22 Dec 2016	LB	(Croatia) David Miličević	(Croatia) Zamet	RK Poreč
22 Dec 2016	LW	(Croatia) Viktor Stipčić	(Croatia) Zamet	Mladi Rudar
January 2017	LB	(Croatia) Petar Jelušić	(Croatia) Zamet	Retirement
4 June 2017	LP	(Croatia) Milan Uzelac	(Croatia) Zamet	Retirement
4 June 2017	LW	(Croatia) Mateo Hrvatin	(Croatia) Zamet	Retirement

Source: Hrsport.net

== Sources ==
- Hrs.hr
- Rk-zamet.hr
- SportCom.hr
- Sport.net.hr
- Rezultati.com
