= List of RK Zamet seasons =

This is a list of all seasons played by RK Zamet in national and European handball, from 1957 to the most recent completed season.

== Key ==
League

- P = Games played
- W = Games won
- D = Games drawn
- L = Games lost
- GF = Goals for
- GA = Goals against
- Pts = Points
- Pos = Final position
- N/A = Not available or applicable

== Results ==
=== League results (1957-present) ===
Season	Pos	League	P	W	D	L	GF	GL	Pts
YUGOSLAVIA
Partizan Zamet
1957/58	6	Croatian Primorje League	14	4	0	10	47	238	8
1958/59	3	Gorski Kotar League	12	8	0	4	190	141	16
1959/60	5	Rijeka League	12	5	0	7	201	249	10
1960/61		Rijeka League							
1961/62	3	Rijeka League	14	9	1	4	244	209	19
1962/63	6	Rijeka Zone League	20	11	3	6	395	306	23
1963/64	6	Regional League of Rijeka and Karlovac	18	10	1	7	262	246	21
1964/65	2	Regional League of Croatia (primorje)	20	16	2	2	385	238	34
1965/66	1	Regional League of Primorje and Karlovac	20	17	0	3	399	262	34
1966/67	3	Regional League of Primorje and Karlovac	20	16	1	3	413	259	32
1967/68	2	Regional League of Primorje and Istra	16	12	1	3	319	311	25
1968/69	4	Regional League of Primorje and Istra	18	11	2	5	338	247	24
1969/70	1	Regional League of Primorje and Istra	12	10	0	2	186	125	20
1970/71	1	Regional League of Primorje and Istra	18	15	2	1	404	243	43
1971/72	2	Regional League of Primorje and Istra	18	12	2	4	367	278	26
1972/73	6	Regional Croatian League	22	8	5	9	384	378	21
1973/74	9	Regional Croatian League	22	9	0	13	346	394	19
1974/75	9	Regional Croatian League	22	15	3	4	354	277	33
1975/76	2	Div 3 (west)	22	16	1	5	364	297	33
1976/77	1	Div 3 (west)	22	21	0	1	614	391	42
Partizan Rijeka
1977/78	1	Div 2 (north)	22	16	3	3	515	421	35
1978/79	14	Yugoslav First League	26	6	2	13	590	631	14
Zamet
1979/80	2	Div 2 (north)	22	17	1	4	489	436	35
1980/81	3	Div 2 (north)	22	13	4	5	495	483	30
1981/82	6	Div 2 (west)	22	8	5	9	505	491	21
1982/83	4	Div 2 (west)	22	11	3	8	500	473	25
1983/84	2	Div 2 (north)	22	15	2	5	552	491	32
1984/85	4	Div 2 (north)	22	11	2	9	456	445	24
1985/86	5	Div 2 (north)	22	10	2	10	458	448	2
1986/87	1	Div 2 (north)	22	15	2	5	474	413	32
1987/88	8	Yugoslav First League	26	11	3	12	536	546	25
1988/89	9	Yugoslav First League	30	15	1	14	683	672	30(-1)
1989/90	9	Yugoslav First League	30	14	1	15	630	642	29
1990/91	12	Yugoslav First League	30	11	1	18	640	690	23
CROATIA
Zamet
1991–92	3	Croatian First A League	10	6	2	2	222	222	14
1991–92	2	Play-offs	7	2	3	2	162	145	
1992–93	5	Croatian First A League	22	9	1	12	465	494	19
1992–93	6	Play-offs	8	4	0	4	176	171	
1993–94	8	Croatian First A League	22	9	1	12	465	494	19
1993–94	8	Play-offs	5	2	0	3	102	118	
1994–95	9	Croatian First A League	22	8	3	11	481	482	19
1994–95	9	Play-offs	3	1	0	2	61	69	
1995–96	1	Croatian First B League	22	21	0	1	633	467	42
1996–97	5	Croatian First A League	22	12	1	9	503	489	24
Zamet Autotrans
1997–98	3	Croatian First A League	22	12	1	9	505	492	28
1998–99	3	Croatian First A League	22	14	1	7	539	492	29
1999–00	7	Croatian First A League	18	7	1	10	440	453	15
1999–00	7	Play-offs	6	4	1	1	196	171	9
Zamet Crotek
2000–01	4	Croatian First A League	22	12	1	9	561	512	25
2000–01	4	Play-offs	2	0	0	2	53	63	
2001–02	4	Croatian First League	30	17	1	12	801	754	35
2002–03	5	Croatian First League	30	16	2	12	799	764	34
2003–04	3	Croatian First League	15	10	1	4	421	361	21
2003–04	4	Play-offs	20	8	1	11	540	537	17
Zamet
2004–05	14	Croatian First League	15	8	1	6	446	416	17
2005–06	3	Croatian First League	14	8	2	4	405	383	18
2005–06	6	Play-offs	19	1	2	16	499	597	4
2006–07	7	Croatian First League	14	4	2	8	389	383	10
2006–07	10	Play-offs	22	10	1	11	569	543	21
2007–08	8	Croatian First League	30	15	0	15	814	813	30
2008–09	14	Dukat Premier League	30	9	2	19	776	858	20
2009–10	12	Dukat Premier League	30	10	3	17	808	856	23
2010–11	9	Dukat Premier League	30	12	3	15	906	937	27
2011–12	7	Dukat Premier League	24	12	3	9	723	654	27
2011–12	7	Play-offs	6	4	0	2	198	181	13
2012–13	5	Dukat Premier League	26	16	1	9	956	670	32 (-1)
2012–13	7	Play-offs	12	7	0	5	345	329	14
2013–14	6	Dukat Premier League	26	15	0	11	735	696	30
2013–14	6	Play-offs	6	4	0	2	185	164	4
2014–15	5	Dukat Premier League	26	13	2	11	745	681	28
2014–15	7	Play-offs	6	5	0	1	190	165	10
2015–16	3	Dukat Premier League	26	17	2	7	731	638	36
2015–16	4	Play-offs	10	3	0	7	268	310	6
2016–17	6	Dukat Premier League	18	8	3	7	543	539	19
2016–17	9	Play-offs	10	4	1	5	293	285	9
2017–18	5	Dukat Premier League	18	9	0	9	471	478	18
2017–18	7	Play-offs	10	6	2	2	312	280	14
2018–19	6	Dukat Premier League	18	8	1	9	502	487	17
2018–19	8	Play-offs	10	6	1	3	290	275	13

=== Cup Results (1992-present) ===
Seasons	Phase of competition	Opponent	Score	Details
1992	Round of 16	Bjelovar	24:21	
1992	Quarter-finals	Zagreb Loto	24:32	
1992	Semi-finals	Coning Medveščak	24:18	Zamet eliminated
1993	Round of 16	Moslavina Kutina	24:20	
1993	Quarter-finals	Trnje (Zagreb)	19:20	
1993	Semi-finals	Medveščak Coning	25:26	Zamet eliminated
1994	?			
1995	Round of 16	Umag	26:24	
1995	Quarter-finals	Zadar Gortan	26:33	
1995	Semi-finals	Karlovačka pivovara	26:22	Zamet eliminated
1996	Round of 16	Metković	24:23	
1996	Quarter-finals	Croatia banka Zagreb	40:24	Zamet eliminated
1997	?			
1998	?			
1999	Round of 16	Moslavina Kutina	18:18, 21:21	
1999	Quarter-finals	Badel 1862 Zagreb	25:17, 21:23	Zamet eliminated
2000	Round of 16	Moslavina Kutina	20:26, 25:21	
2000	Quarter-finals	Karlovac	24:27, 26:26	
2000	Semi-finals	Zagreb osiguranje	22:30	
2000	Final	Badel 1862 Zagreb	33:28	Zamet eliminated
2001	Round of 16	Moslavina Kutina	37:23, 19:24	
2001	Quarter-finals	Zagreb osiguranje	24:24, 31:25	
2001	Semi-finals	Varteks Di Caprio	22:28	
2001	Final	Metković Jambo	28:22	Zamet eliminated
2002	Round of 16	Trogir Alpro ATT	21:42, 46:21	
2002	Quarter-final	Đakovo	28:23, 22:30	
2002	Semi-final	Metković Jambo	27:22	Zamet eliminated
2003	Round of 16	Buzet BUP	37:24 (29:22)	
2003	Quarter-finals	Moslavina Kutina	29:22 (22:28)	
2003	Semi-finals	RK Zagreb	27:45	Zamet eliminated
2004	Round of 16	Split	20:25	
2004	Quarter-finals	Zadar	25:27	
2004	Semi-finals	Metković	31:27	Zamet eliminated
2004	3rd place	Medveščak Infosistem Zagreb	30:29	Zamet eliminated
2005	Round of 16	Gorica	32:33 (7m)	Zamet eliminated
2006	Round of 16	Gorica	32:33 (7m)	Zamet eliminated
2007	Round of 16	Bjelovar	20:24	
2007	Quarter-finals	Karlovac	28:19	Zamet eliminated
2008	Round of 16	Moslavina Kutina	25:20	
2008	Quarter-finals	NEXE Našice	35:31	Zamet eliminated
2009	Round of 16	Bjelovar	31:26	Zamet eliminated
2010	Round of 16	Croatia Osiguranje Zagreb	25:43	Zamet eliminated
2011	Round of 16	NEXE Našice	37:31	Zamet eliminated
2012	Round of 16	Vidovec BIOS	29:37	
2012	Quarter-finals	Bjelovar	33:28	
2012	Semi-finals	NEXE Našice	28:35	
2012	Final	Croatia Osiguranje Zagreb	23:36	Zamet eliminated
2013	Round of 16	Poreč	26:27	Zamet eliminated
2014	Round of 16	Spačva Vinkovci	29:27	
2014	Quarter-finals	NEXE Našice	37:20	Zamet eliminated
2015	Round of 16	Prvo Plinarsko Društvo Zagreb	24:34	Zamet eliminated
2016	Round of 16	Varaždin 1930	24:34	Zamet eliminated
2017	Round of 16	Vidovec	32:29	Zamet eliminated
2018	Round of 16	NEXE Našice	29:17	Zamet eliminated
2019	Round of 16	Čakovec	32:31	Zamet eliminated

=== Zamet II league results ===
Season	Pos	League	P	W	D	L	GF	GL	Pts
YUGOSLAVIA
Partizan Rijeka II
1977-78	1	Primorje zone league	22	20	0	2	523	367	39
1978-79	5	Primorje and Gorski kotar zone league	22	14	0	8	469	403	28
Zamet II
1979-80									
1980-81									
1981-82	9	Primorje and Gorski kotar zone league	22	8	2	12	501	516	18
1982-83									
1983-84									
1984-85									
1985-86									
1986-87	9	Primorje and Istria regional league	22	9	2	1	412	420	19 (-1)
1987-88	7	Primorje and Istria regional league	22	10	0	12	436	457	18
1988-89	8	Primorje and Istria regional league	22	9	1	12	468	476	19
1989-90	4	Primorje and Istria regional league	22	13	2	2	453	415	28
1990-91	7	Inter-municipal league	24	10	2	11	454	477	23
CROATIA
Zamet II
1995-96	5	2.HRL - West	14	5	1	8	335	345	11
1996-97	7	2.HRL - West	22	10	1	11	470	489	21
2000-01	12	2.HRL - West	24	5	2	17	578	670	12
2001-02	7	2.HRL - West 2	26	13	2	11	543	580	27
2002-03	6	3.HRL - West	24	12	0	12	632	588	24
2003-04	9	3.HRL - West 2	28	14	2	12	899	862	30
2004-05	1	3.HRL - West	28	23	2	3	993	743	48
2005-06									
2006-07	6	3.HRL - West	28	16	3	9	903	865	35
2007-08	4	3.HRL - West	28	20	0	8	994	774	40
2008-09	2	3.HRL - West	28	25	0	3	1021	310	50
2009-10	8	3.HRL - West	26	12	3	11	727	719	26
2010-11	2	3.HRL - West	22	18	0	4	741	592	36
2011-12	1	3.HRL - West	24	23	0	1	780	565	46
2012-13	11	2.HRL - West	20	3	0	17	513	645	5 (-1)
2013-14	7	3.HRL - West	20	9	1	10	630	619	19
2014-15	6	3.HRL - West	16	8	0	8	545	542	16
2015-16	3	3.HRL - West	16	10	2	4	530	466	22

=== Tournaments ===
Year	Tournament name	Phase of competition	Results	Opponent	Details
1967	Championship of Croatia	Qualification round	11:10 (15:11)	Rovinj	
1967	Championship of Croatia	First round	16:20	Grafičar	Zamet lost
1967	Championship of Croatia	Second round	11:28	Split	Zamet lost
1967	Championship of Croatia	Third round	21:10	RK Vinkovci Lokomotiva	Zamet 3rd place
1984	Memorial Jurica Lakić	Final	22:24	Borac Banja Luka	Zamet 2nd place
1985	Memorial Jurica Lakić	First round	28:23	HC Scafati	
1985	Memorial Jurica Lakić	Second round	27:11	Dubrovac	
1985	Memorial Jurica Lakić	Semi-finals	23:19	Nürnberg	
1985	Memorial Jurica Lakić	Finals	22:19	Medveščak	Zamet won 1st place
1991	Edi Berbonić tournament	Semi-finals	32:19	Rovinj	
1991	Edi Berbonić tournament	Finals	17:16	Istraturist Umag	Zamet won 1st place
1991	City of Rijeka tournament	Semi-finals	16:15	Medveščak Coning	
1991	City of Rijeka tournament	Finals	19:16	Istraturist Umag	Zamet won 1st place
1992	Hera Gold Cup	Semi-finals	11:8	Split	
1992	Hera Gold Cup	Finals	31:18	Rudar Labin	Zamet won 1st place
2010	West region cup	Finals	34:31	Crikvenica	Zamet won 1st place
2014	Memorial Robert Barbić	Semi-finals	21:22	Kozala	
2014	Memorial Robert Barbić	Finals	32:20	Senj	Zamet won 1st place
2014	PGŽ Cup	Finals	26:39	Kozala	Zamet won 1st place
2015	Memorial Robert Barbić	Semi-finals	22:14	Ribola Kaštela	
2015	Memorial Robert Barbić	Finals	21:16	Buzet	Zamet won 1st place

=== Youth tournaments ===
Year	Tournament name	Phase of competition	Results	Opponent	Details
1990	U-19 Championship of Croatia	Quarter-finals	30:19	Partizan Bjelovar	
1990	U-19 Championship of Croatia	Semi-finals	29:25	Elektra Osijek	
1990	U-19 Championship of Croatia	Finals	27:19	Zagreb	Zamet won 1st place
1994	U-18 Championship of Croatia	Semi-finals	12:11	Bjelovar	Zamet lost
1994	U-18 Championship of Croatia	3rd place	15:14	Slavonija DI	Zamet won 3rd place
1996	U-19 Championship of Croatia	Final	20:18	Croatia banka Zagreb	Zamet won 1st place

== Honours ==
=== Croatia ===
- Croatian Premier Handball League

Runner-up (1): 1992
Third (2): 1997-98, 1998-99

- Croatian Handball Cup

Runner-up (3): 2000, 2001, 2012

- Croatian Second Handball League (1): 1995-96

=== Yugoslavia ===
- Yugoslav Second League (2): 1977–78, 1986–87

Runner-up (2): 1979-80, 1983-84

- Yugoslav Third League (1): 1976-77
- Regional League (3): 1965–66, 1969–70, 1970–71

Runner-up (2): 1964-65, 1967-68, 1971-72

- Croatian Handball Champion (1): 1977

=== Zamet II ===
- 3. HRL - West (2): 2004–05, 2011–12

=== Youth ===
- Croatian Handball Championship U-19 (2): 1990, 1996
- Croatian Handball Championship U-18

Runner-up (1): 2008
Third (1): 1994

- Croatian Handball Championship U-16 (1): 2016
- Croatian Handball Championship U-14 (3): 1969, 1974, 1981
