= 2018–19 RK Zamet season =

Zamet Rijeka
2018–19 season
- President: Vedran Devčić
- Coach: Nedjeljko Lalić
- Venue: Centar Zamet
- Dukat Premier League: 8th
- Croatian Cup: Round of 16
- Top goalscorer: League: Filip Glavaš - 154 goals All: Filip Glavaš – 160 goals
Home colours	Away colours

The 2018–19 season was the 62nd season in RK Zamet’s history. It is their 11th successive season in the Dukat Premier League, and 41st successive top tier season.

== Team ==
=== Current squad ===
Goalkeeper

- 1 (Croatia) Fran Lučin
- 12 (Croatia) Marin Sorić
- 30 (Croatia) Tino Viskić

Wingers
RW

- 5 (Croatia) Martin Mozetić
- 6 (Croatia) Jakov Mozetić
- 77 (Croatia) Filip Glavaš

LW

- 2 (Croatia) Dujam Dunato
- 10 (Croatia) Dario Jeličić (captain)
- 22 (Croatia) Marko Mrakovčić

Line players

- 90 (Croatia) Veron Načinović

Back players
LB

- 7 (Croatia) Luka Grgurević

CB

- 8 (Croatia) Tin Lučin
- 9 (Croatia) Nikola Njegovan
- 17 (Croatia) Nikola Babić
- 88 (Croatia) Patrik Martinović

RB

- 13 (Croatia) Tin Tomljanović
- 86 (Croatia) Matija Starčević

Source: Rukometstat.com

== Technical staff ==
- (Croatia) President: Vedran Devčić
- (Croatia) Sports director: Vedran Babić
- (Croatia) Head Coach: Nedjeljko Lalić
- (Croatia) Assistant Coach: Marin Mišković
- (Croatia) Goalkeeper Coach: Valter Matošević
- (Croatia) Fizioterapist: Dragan Marijanović
- (Croatia) Fitness coach: Milan Rončević
- (Croatia) Team Manager: Boris Konjuh

== Competitions ==
=== Overall ===
Competition	First match	Last match	Starting round	Final position	Record							
Competition	First match	Last match	Starting round	Final position	G	W	D	L	GF	GA	GD	Win %
Dukat Premier League - Regular season	22 September 2018	9 March 2019	Matchday 1	6th	18	8	1	9	502	487	+15	44.44
Dukat Premier League - Play-offs	16 March 2019	TBD	Matchday 1	3rd	10	5	1	4	310	291	+19	50.00
Croatian Cup	5 December 2018	27 February 2019	Qualifying Round	Round of 16	4	1	0	3	106	107	−1	25.00
Total					32	14	2	16	918	885	+33	43.75

Last updated: 1 June 2019

== Dukat Premier League ==
=== League table ===
Pos.	Team	Pld.	W	D	L	Goal+	Goal-	+/-	Pts.	Qualification or relegation
1.	Dubrava Zagreb	18	14	1	3	565	530	+35	29	Championship play-offs
2.	Umag	18	11	1	6	503	485	+18	23	Championship play-offs
3.	Poreč	18	11	1	6	463	443	+20	23	Championship play-offs
4.	Spačva Vinkovci	18	10	0	8	489	492	-3	20	Championship play-offs
5.	Sesvete	18	9	0	9	496	462	+34	18	Relegation play-offs
6.	Zamet Rijeka	18	8	1	9	502	487	+15	17	Relegation play-offs
7.	Rudan Labin	18	7	1	10	459	468	-9	15	Relegation play-offs
8.	Varaždin 1930	18	6	2	10	481	520	-39	14	Relegation play-offs
9.	Rudar Rude	18	4	3	11	468	500	-32	11	Relegation play-offs
10.	Gorica	18	4	2	12	505	544	-39	10	Relegation play-offs

Updated to match(es) played on 10 March 2019. Source: Premijer liga Rezultati.com

=== Matches ===
22 September 2018 1	Sesvete	28:24	Zamet	Sesvete
18:00 CEST		Report		Stadium: Gradska dvorana Sesvete; Attendance: 100

29 September 2018 2	Zamet	32:26	Varaždin 1930	Rijeka
18:00 CEST		Report		Stadium: Dvorana Mladosti; Attendance: 150

6 October 2018 3	Rudar Rude	27:24	Zamet	Rude
19:30 CEST		Report		Stadium: Dvorana Rude; Attendance: 100

14 October 2018 4	Zamet	25:29	Dubrava Zagreb	Rijeka
18:00 CEST		Report		Stadium: Centar Zamet; Attendance: 200; Referee: Ante Pavić & Mate Torbarina (Zadar)

20 October 2018 5	Rudan Labin	27:24	Zamet	Labin
20:00 CEST		Report		Stadium: SC Franko Mileta; Attendance: 700; Referee: Ivan Grbavac (Makarska) & Siniša Ravlić (Vrgorac)

3 November 2018 6	Spačva Vinkovci	26:24	Zamet	Vinkovci
19:00 CEST		Report		Stadium: SD Bartol Kašić; Attendance: 200

10 November 2018 7	Zamet	34:26	Poreč	Rijeka
18:00 CEST		Report		Stadium: Centar Zamet; Attendance: 241; Referee: Marko Duspara & Hrvoje Rogić (Velika Gorica)

17 November 2018 8	Umag	26:26	Zamet	Umag
19:00 CEST		Report		Stadium: SD Stella Maris; Attendance: 700; Referee: Nikola Knežević & Dalibor Tunuković (Vrpolje)

24 November 2018 9	Zamet	34:30	Gorica	Rijeka
18:00 CEST		Report		Stadium: Centar Zamet; Attendance: 163; Referee: Igor Emanović & Zoran Mikić (Štivica)

1 December 2018 10	Zamet	30:24	Sesvete	Rijeka
19:00 CEST		Report		Stadium: Centar Zamet; Attendance: 200; Referee: Davor Lončar & Zoran Lončar (Varaždin)

8 December 2018 11	Varaždin 1930	29:27	Zamet	Varaždin
20:00 CEST		Report		Stadium: Varaždin Arena; Attendance: 100; Referee: Igor Hunjadi & Mario Zečević (Zagreb)

15 December 2018 12	Zamet	29:26	Rudar Rude	Rijeka
19:00 CEST		Report		Stadium: Centar Zamet; Attendance: 100; Referee: Matija Gubica & Boris Milošević (Osijek)

2 February 2018 13	Dubrava Zagreb	34:33	Zamet	Zagreb
19:00 CEST		Report		Stadium: ŠD Dubrava; Attendance: 100; Referee: Ante Pavić & Mate Torbarina (Zadar))

9 February 2019 14	Zamet	26:24	Rudan Labin	Rijeka
17:00 CEST		Report		Stadium: Dvorana Mladosti; Attendance: 250; Referee: Igor Barle & Saša Vučić (Zagreb)

16 February 2019 15	Zamet	28:22	Spačva Vinkovci	Rijeka
19:00 CEST		Report		Stadium: Centar Zamet; Attendance: 400; Referee: Davor & Zoran Lončar (Varaždin)

23 February 2019 16	Poreč	28:24	Zamet	Poreč
19:00 CEST		Report		Stadium: SRC Veli Jože; Attendance: 200; Referee: Siniša Bosak & Željko Herceg (Varaždin)

2 March 2019 17	Zamet	30:22	Umag	Rijeka
18:00 CEST		Report		Stadium: Centar Zamet; Attendance: 400; Referee: Matija Gubica & Boris Milošević (Osijek)

9 March 2019 18	Gorica	33:28	Zamet	Velika Gorica
19:30 CEST		Report		Stadium: Dvorana srednjih škola Attendance: 100; Referee: Dalibor Jurinković (Zadar) & Marko Mrvica (Biograd na moru)

== Relegation play-offs ==
=== League table ===
Pos.	Team	Pld.	W	D	L	Goal+	Goal-	+/-	Pts.	Qualification or relegation
1.	Gorica	20	12	3	5	606	562	+44	27	Dukat Premier League 2018-19
2.	Zamet Rijeka	20	11	1	8	568	549	+19	23	Dukat Premier League 2018-19
3.	Sesvete	20	11	0	9	557	520	+37	22	Dukat Premier League 2018-19
4.	Varaždin 1930	20	9	3	8	546	552	-6	21	Dukat Premier League 2018-19
5.	Rudan Labin	20	8	2	10	511	530	-19	18	Relegation to Prva HRL 2019-20
6.	Rudar Rude	20	3	3	14	522	597	-75	9	Relegation to Prva HRL 2019-20

Updated to match(es) played on 1 June 2019. This table contains statistics combined with the regular part of the Dukat Premier League with matches played by team in the relegation play-offs. Source: SportCom.hr

=== Matches ===
16 March 2019 1	Zamet	34:29	Rudar Rude	Rijeka
18:00 CEST		Report		Stadium: Centar Zamet; Attendance: 202; Referee: Matija Gubica & Boris Milošević (Osijek)

16 March 2019 2	Sesvete	28:29	Zamet	Sesvete
17:30 CEST		Report		Stadium: SŠ Jelkovec; Attendance: 200; Referee: Igor Brale & Saša Vučić (Zagreb)

31 March 2019 3	Zamet	34:29	Gorica	Rijeka
18:00 CEST		Report		Stadium: Dvorana Mladosti; Attendance: 128; Referee: Ivica Glavinić & Mile Veraja (Metković)

7 April 2019 4	Zamet	21:25	Rudan Labin	Rijeka
18:00 CEST		Report		Stadium: Centar Zamet; Attendance: 266; Referee: Robert Gonzurek & Tomislav Cindrić (Osijek)

20 April 2019 5	Varaždin 1930	24:23	Zamet	Varaždin
18:00 CEST		Report		Stadium: Varaždin Arena; Attendance: 266; Referee: Robert Gonzurek & Tomislav Cindrić (Osijek)

27 April 2019 6	Rudar Rude	28:23	Zamet	Rude
18:00 CEST		Report		Stadium: Dvorana Rude; Attendance: 250; Referee: Robert Gonzurek & Tomislav Cindrić (Osijek)

4 May 2019 7	Zamet	33:29	Sesvete	Rijeka
18:00 CEST		Report		Stadium: Centar Zamet; Attendance: 250; Referee: Matija Gubica & Boris Milošević (Osijek)

11 May 2019 8	Gorica	39:31	Zamet	Velika Gorica
18:00 CEST		Report		Stadium: Dvorana Srednjih Škola; Attendance: 200; Referee: Ivica Glavinić & Mile Veraja (Metković)

25 May 2019 9	Rudan Labin	21:21	Zamet	Velika Gorica
18:00 CEST		Report		Stadium: SC Franko Mileta; Attendance: 450; Referee: Dalibor Jurinković (Zadar) & Marko Mrvica (Biograd na moru)

1 June 2019 10	Zamet	32:26	Varaždin 1930	Rijeka
18:00 CEST		Report		Stadium: Centar Zamet; Attendance: 100; Referee: Matija Gubica & Boris Milošević (Osijek)

== Croatian Cup ==
=== PGŽ Cup - Qualifier matches ===
5 December 2018 Final	Zamet	31:26	Kozala	Rijeka
20:00 CEST		Report		Stadium: Centar Zamet; Attendance: 200; Referee: Predrag Krmek (Rijeka) & Igor Prpić (Kostrena)

=== Matches ===
27 February 2019 Round of 16	Čakovec	32:31	Zamet	Čakovec
19:30 CEST		Report		Stadium: DGŠ Čakovec; Attendance: 800; Referee: Siniša Bosak & Željko Herceg (Varaždin)

== Friendly matches ==
=== Pre-season matches ===
29 August 2018 Friendly	Zamet	28:27	Mornar-Crikvenica	Rijeka
18:00 CEST		Report		Stadium: Centar Zamet

5 September 2018 Friendly	Mornar-Crikvenica	24:27	Zamet	Crikvenica
18:00 CEST		Report		Stadium: GSD Crikvenica

12 September 2018 Friendly	Karlovac	27:24	Zamet	Karlovac
17:00 CEST		Report		Stadium: OŠ Grabrik

=== Mid-season matches ===
26 January 2019 Friendly	Zamet	33:31	Buzet	Rijeka
17:00 CEST		Report		Stadium: Centar Zamet

6 February 2019 Friendly	Zamet	35:29	Buzet	Rijeka
17:00 CEST		Report		Stadium: Centar Zamet

== Transfers ==
=== In ===
Date	Position	Player	From	To
9 August 2018	LW	(Croatia) Viktor Stipić	(Croatia) RK Kozala	Zamet
22 August 2018	CB	(Croatia) Nikola Babić	(Croatia) RK KTC Križevci	Zamet
14 October 2018	CB	(Croatia) Tin Lučin	(Croatia) PPD Zagreb	Zamet
29 October 2018	RW	(Croatia) Filip Glavaš	(Croatia) Varaždin 1930	Zamet

=== Out ===
Date	Position	Player	From	To
9 July 2018	CB	(Croatia) Matija Golik	(Croatia) Zamet	(Slovenia) Maribor
9 July 2018	LW	(Croatia) Damir Vučko	(Croatia) Zamet	(Croatia) Buzet
1 August 2018	LP	(Croatia) Ivan Majić	(Croatia) Zamet	(Slovenia) Dobova

== Sources ==
- Hrs.hr
- Rk-zamet.hr
- SportCom.hr
- Sport.net.hr
- Rezultati.com
