= Tomislav Milinković =

Croatian handball player (born 1984)

Personal information
- Full name: Tomislav Milinković
- Born: June 5, 1984 (age 42) Koper, SFR Yugoslavia
- Height: 1.97 m (6 ft 5 1/2 in)

Sport
- Sport: Handball
- Position: Goal Keeper
- Current club: (Croatia) RK Umag
- Number: 1

Senior clubs
- Years: Team
- 2000–2005: (Croatia) RK Umag
- 2005–2007: (Croatia) RK Poreč
- 2009–2009: (Italy) Bologna United
- 2009–2011: (Croatia) RK NEXE
- 2011–2012: (Finland) Cocks
- 2012–: (Croatia) RK Umag

Tomislav Milinković (born 5 June 1984) is a Croatian handball player, who currently plays for Croatian Premijer liga club RK Umag. He was a member of the Croatian Jr. National Team and played for professional teams in Croatia, Italy and Finland.

Milinković was also the first Croatian to play in the Baltic League, when he signed with Finnish top team Riihimäen Cocks in 2011. Despite the club's troubled season, the Croatian goalkeeper played a decisive role in winning the Finnish highest division bronze medal.

== Clubs ==
- (Croatia) RK Umag (2000–05)
- (Croatia) RK Poreč (2005–07)
- (Italy) Bologna United Handball (2007–09)
- (Croatia) RK NEXE (2009–11)
- (Finland) Riihimäen Cocks (2011–12)
- (Croatia) RK Umag (2012– )

== Honours ==
=== Club ===
==== Croatian Premier Handball League ====
- Runner-up: 2009-10

==== Croatian Handball Cup ====
- Runner-up: 2002-03

==== Finnish Premier Division ====
- Bronze medal: 2011-12
