= Černeka =

Černeka, sometimes spelled Cerneka, Cerneca, Cernecca or Cherneka) is a Croatian surname, originally from Istria. It may refer to:

- Dario Černeka (born 1991), Croatian handball player
- Williams Černeka (born 1959), Croatian handball player
