= Satnica =

Coordinates: 45°36′51″N 18°29′25″E

- Village (Selo)
- Interactive map of Satnica

Satnica is a village near Petrijevci, Croatia. In the 2011 census, it had 571 inhabitants.
