= Lovro Jotić =

Croatian handball player (born 1994)

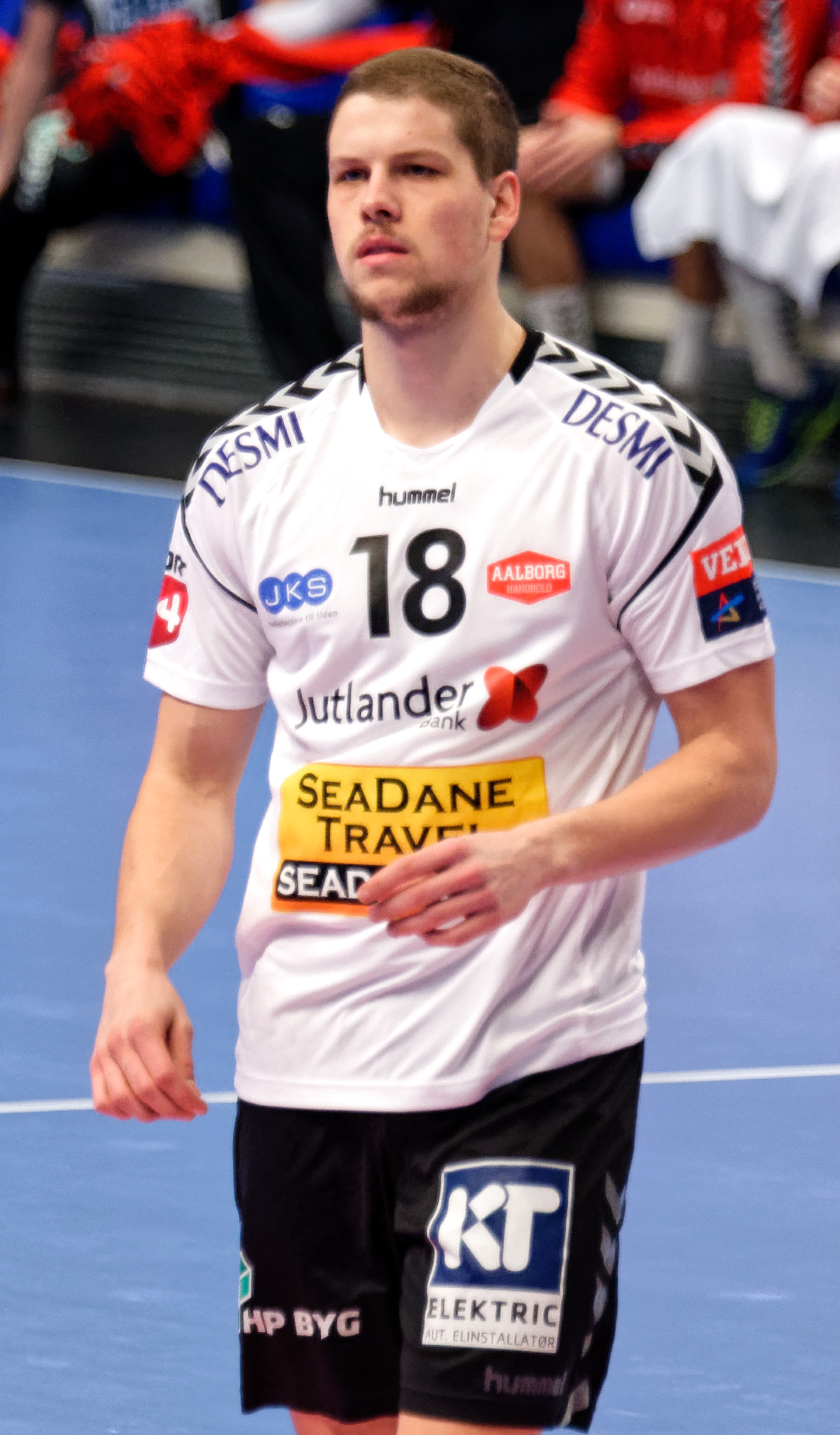

Personal information
- Nationality: Croatian
- Born: 12 November 1994 (age 31) Zagreb, Croatia
- Height: 1.91 m (6 ft 3 in)

Sport
- Sport: Handball
- Position: Centre back
- Current club: GRK Ohrid
- Number: 23

Youth career
- Years: Team
- –: RK Zagreb

Senior clubs
- Years: Team
- 2013–2014: RK Umag
- 2014–2015: RK Zamet
- 2015–2016: RK Dubrava
- 2016–2017: RK Zagreb
- 2017–2018: Aalborg Håndbold
- 2018–2019: RK Zagreb
- 2019–2020: RK Eurofarm Pelister
- 2020–2021: RK Vardar 1961
- 2021–2023: SC DHfK Leipzig
- 2023–2024: RK Nexe Našice
- 10/2024–: GRK Ohrid
National team
Years	Team	Apps	(Gls)
–	Croatia	15	(12)
Medal record
Mediterranean Games
Gold medal – first place	2018 Tarragona	Team
Youth World Championship
Silver medal – second place	2013 Hungary
- Updated on 29 July 2023

Lovro Jotić (born 12 November 1994) is a Croatian handball player who plays for GRK Ohrid.

He participated at the 2019 World Men's Handball Championship.

== Honours ==
Zagreb

- Premier League: 2016–17
- Croatian Cup: 2017

Vardar

- Macedonian Handball Super League: 2021
- Macedonian Handball Cup: 2021
