= Tomaševac =

Tomaševac Томашевац
- Village (Selo)
- Location within Serbia Tomaševac (Serbia) Tomaševac (Europe)
- Coordinates: 45°16′02″N 20°37′09″E
- Country: Serbia
- Province: Vojvodina
- District: Central Banat
- Municipalities: Zrenjanin
- Elevation: 59 m (194 ft)

Population (2002)
  - Tomaševac: 1,765
- Time zone: UTC+1 (CET)
  - Summer (DST): UTC+2 (CEST)
- Postal code: 23262
- Area code: +381(0)23
- Car plates: ZR

Tomaševac (Serbian Cyrillic: Томашевац; Hungarian: Tamáslaka) is a village in Serbia. It is located in the Zrenjanin municipality, in the Central Banat District, Vojvodina province. The village has a Serb ethnic majority (92.12%) and its population numbering 1,765 people (2002 census).

== Name ==
Names in other languages: Hungarian: Tamáslaka, German: Tomaschewatz.

== Historical population ==
- 1961: 2,532
- 1971: 2,354
- 1981: 2,149
- 1991: 1,904

== See also ==
- List of places in Serbia
- List of cities, towns and villages in Vojvodina
