= Dino Slavić =

Croatian handball player (born 1992)

Personal information
- Nationality: Croatian
- Born: 4 December 1992 (age 33) Rijeka, Croatia
- Height: 1.85 m (6 ft 1 in)

Sport
- Sport: Handball
- Position: Goalkeeper
- Current club: GRK Ohrid
- Number: 12

Senior clubs
- Years: Team
- 2008–2016: RK Zamet
- 2016–2018: RK Umag
- 2018–2021: Abanca Ademar León
- 2021–2023: RK Zagreb
- 2023–2026: Limoges Handball
- 2026–: GRK Ohrid
National team
| Years | Team | Apps | (Gls) |
| – | Croatia | 13 | (0) |
Medal record
European Championship
| Bronze medal – third place | 2026 Denmark/Norway/Sweden |
- Updated on 2 February 2026

Dino Slavić (born 4 December 1992) is a Croatian handball player who plays for GRK Ohrid.

== Career ==
Slavić started his handball career in his hometown club RK Zamet. At Zamet he spent eight years mostly goalkeeping with colleague Marin Đurica.

In 2012 alongside RK Zamet he got the finals of the Croatian Cup. The next season, he played his first EHF Cup match.

At the 2026 European Men's Handball Championship he won bronze medals with Croatia, losing to Germany in the semifinal and beating Iceland in the third-place playoff.

== Honours ==
=== RK Zamet ===
- Croatian Cup
  - Finalist (1): 2012

=== Individual ===
- Dukat Premier League best saves percentage in 2011–12 season - 41,6%
- Dukat Premier League best breakthrough percentage in 2011–12 season - 55,0%
- Dukat Premier League best fastbreak percentage in 2012–13 season - 32,5%
- Dukat Premier League best wing percentage in 2014-15 - 44,4%
- Dukat Premier League best 9m percentage in 2014-15 - 52,4%
- Dukat Premier League best 9m percentage in 2015-16 - 48,2%
- Dukat Premier League best 6m percentage in 2015-16 - 27,4%
- Dukat Premier League best fastbreak percentage in 2015-16 - 28,3%
- Dukat Premier League best fastbreak save percentage in 2015-16 - 0,50 avg.
- Dukat Premier League most fastbreak saves in 2015-16 - 17 avg.
