= David Miličević =

Croatian handball player (born 1992)

Personal information
- Nationality: Croatian
- Born: 2 March 1992 (age 34) Slavonski Brod
- Height: 1.96 m (6 ft 5 in)

Sport
- Sport: Handball
- Position: Left back
- Current club: Zamet
- Number: 23

Senior clubs
- Years: Team
- 2009-2011: RK Bjelovar
- 2011-2013: RK Poreč
- 2013-2014: Meshkov Brest
- 2014-2015: Chambéry
- 2015: Al Sadd
- 2016-2017: Zamet
- 2017-present: Poreč
National team
- Years: Team
- 2012-2013: Croatia U-20
- 2011-2013: Croatia U-21
Medal record
Representing Croatia

David Miličević (born 2 March 1992) is a Croatian handball player who currently plays for Zamet.

He has competed in SEHA League, EHF Cup and EHF Cup Winners' Cup.

== International career ==
Miličević for various national team youth selections. He played for Croatia U-21 at 2011 Youth World Championship where they finished in eight place and 2013 Juniors World Championship where they lost in the third place match to France.

== Honours ==
Meshkov Brest

- Belarusian Premier League (1): 2013–14
- Belarusian Cup (1): 2014
- SEHA League runner-up (1): 2014

Al Sadd

- GCC Club Handball Champions (1): 2015

Individual

- Dukat Premier League most goals shot from 9m in 2012–13 season - 129 goals
