= Luka Mrakovčić =

Croatian handball player (born 1994)

Personal information
- Nationality: Croatian
- Born: 22 September 1994 (age 32) Rijeka, Croatia
- Height: 1.91 m (6 ft 3 in)

Sport
- Sport: Handball
- Position: Centre Back
- Current club: RK Zamet
- Number: 22

Youth career
- Years: Team
- –: (Croatia) RK Pećine
- –: (Croatia) MRK Kozala Rijeka
- –: (Croatia) RK Zamet

Senior clubs
- Years: Team
- 2011–2015: (Croatia) RK Zamet
- 2015–2016: (North Macedonia) RK Metalurg Skopje
- 2017–2021: (Croatia) RK Zagreb
- 2021–2024: (Germany) TuS N-Lübbecke
- 2024–: (Croatia) RK Zamet
National team
Years	Team	Apps	(Gls)
2019–	Croatia	1	(0)
Medal record
Representing Croatia
Youth World Championship
Silver medal – second place	2013 Hungary	Team

Luka Mrakovčić (born 22 September 1994) is a Croatian handball player who plays for RK Zamet and the Croatia national team.

== Career ==
Mrakovčić started his career at youth clubs Pećine and Kozala before joining Premier League club RK Zamet. During his first season he played mostly for the club's second team and won the fourth division league title. During the end of the season he played matches for the senior team. The club has also reached the final of the Croatian Cup but was defeated by defending champions CO Zagreb 23:36.

Mrakovčić became a regular player in the squad of Zamet even playing matches in the EHF Cup. In 2015 Lino Červar called up Mrakovčić to play for Macedonian RK Metalurg Skopje.

== Personal life ==
He has a younger brother Marko who is a handball player at RK Zamet.

== Honours ==
Zamet II

- 3. HRL - West (2): 2011–12

Zagreb

- Premier League: 2016–17, 2017–18, 2018–19
- Croatian Cup: 2017, 2018, 2019
