= Turčin =

- Village
- Location of Turčin in Croatia
- Coordinates: 46°15′25″N 16°21′36″E
- Country: Croatia
- County: Varaždin County
- Municipality: Gornji Kneginec

Area
  - Total: 1.4 km^{2} (0.54 sq mi)

Population (2021)
  - Total: 803
  - Density: 570/km^{2} (1,500/sq mi)
- Time zone: UTC+1 (CET)
  - Summer (DST): UTC+2 (CEST)
- Postal code: 42204 Turčin
- Area code: +385 (0)42

Turčin is a village in Croatia. It is connected by the D3 highway and R201 railway.
