= Mateo Hrvatin =

Croatian handball player and coach (born 1980)

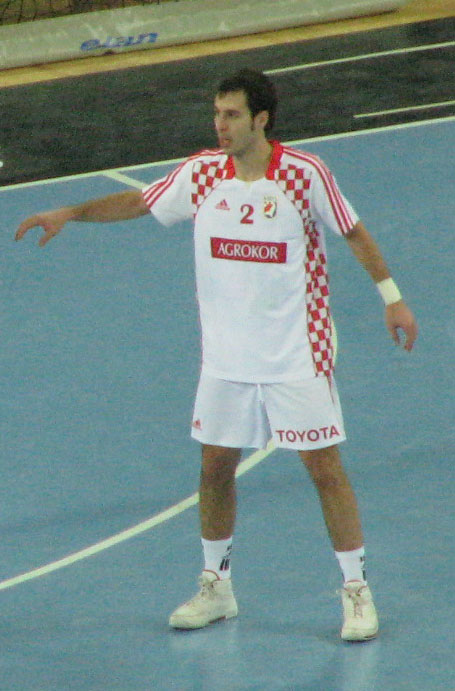
- Hrvatin playing for Croatia in 2008

Personal information
- Nationality: Croatian
- Born: 15 August 1980 (age 46) Rijeka, Croatia
- Height: 1.81 m (5 ft 11 in)

Sport
- Sport: Handball
- Position: Left wing

Youth career
- Years: Team
- –: RK Kvarner

Senior clubs
- Years: Team
- 1997-2000: RK Pećine
- 2000-2009: Zamet
- 2009: CO Zagreb
- 2009-2013: Zamet
- 2013-2015: Crikvenica
- 2015-2017: Zamet
National team
Years	Team	Apps	(Gls)
2008-2010	Croatia	15	(32)
Title
2014-2015	Sports director	Crikvenica	

Teams managed
- 2014: RK Crikvenica (interim)
- 2017: Zamet (Youth)
Medal record
Representing Croatia
Men's Handball
World Championship
Silver medal – second place	2009 Croatia	Team

Mateo Hrvatin (born 15 August 1980) is a former Croatian handballer, who played as left winger for RK Zamet, CO Zagreb and RK Crikvenica. He was selected by the Croatian national team for the 2009 World Men's Handball Championship.

== Early life ==
Mateo Hrvatin was born 15 August 1980 in Rijeka where he grew up.

Hrvatin started playing handball in Rijeka at local club RK Kvarner. At Kvarner he passed various youth selections before playing at the senior level.

== Career ==
He started his senior career at club RK Pećine which at the time was in the First B League.

In 2000 he got called up to play for Zamet in the First League (later Premier League) where he spent most of his career. Hrvatin's first two seasons saw him playing at top level in the league and reaching the finals of the Croatian Cup. He debuted in his first European competition in the EHF Cup Winners' Cup, reaching the fourth round in 2001 and 2002 being eliminated by FC Porto and Montpellier. Hrvatin established himself quickly in Zamet. Up until the 2006-07 season Zamet was in top flight of the league and then the club hit financial trouble so big that at one time they weren't paying salaries to Hrvatin and captain Milan Uzelac and Robert Savković among others.

In 2008. Hrvatin was called up to play for the national team by coach Lino Červar and was picked for the 2009 World Championship. In January 2009, Hrvatin moved to Croatia Osiguranje Zagreb for the remainder of the 2008-09 season and with the club won the Premier League and Cup. He reached the quarter-final of the EHF Champions League with the club.

In July 2009 Hrvatin returned to Zamet and stayed there for four more years. In his second spell his most notable accomplishment was reaching the finals in the Croatian Cup in 2012 and playing qualifiers in the EHF Cup the next season. They lost their first qualifier to Meso Lovoseice on aggregate.

In August 2013 Hrvatin left Zamet and started playing for RK Crikvenica. For two seasons he competed for the club in First league (second tier) and at one time he was the coach and sports director.

In August 2015 Hrvatin announced that he'd be returning to Zamet yet again. After his announcement there was a lot of doubt if Hrvatin could still play at top level because he had turned 35. In his first season back, he showed great form and ended up being the club's top scorer of the season while helping Zamet to the league play-offs for the first time in ten years. Zamet finished in fourth place reaching the EHF Cup qualifiers. During the qualifiers they beat Créteil and CSM București. Zamet reached the third qualifying round of the EHF Cup where they were defeated by MT Melsungen.

Hrvatin announced his retirement at the end of the 2016-17 season alongside his long standing teammate Milan Uzelac.

== Personal life ==
Hrvatin is married and has a son.

== Honours ==
=== As player ===
RK Zamet

- Croatian Handball Cup
  - Finalist (2): 2001, 2012

RK Croatia Osiguranje Zagreb

- Dukat Premier League
  - Winner (1): 2008–09
- Croatian Handball Cup
  - Winner (1): 2009

Croatia

- 2009 World Championship - 2nd place

Individual

- Selection of the most successful athletes by: COC: 2009
- Special recognition for achievements in sports by PGŽ: 2009
- RK Zamet hall of fame - 2015
- Best fastbreak goal percentage in Dukat Premier League season 2015-16 - 84,9%

== Orders ==
- Order of the Croatian Interlace - 2009

== Sources ==
- Igrači-aktualni sastav (in Croatian)
- Mateo Hrvatin uspješno debitirao na Svjetskom prvenstvu (in Croatian)
- Petar Orgulić - 50 godina rukometa u Rijeci (2005), Adria public
