= Raul Valković =

Croatian handball player (born 1989)

Personal information
- Nationality: Croatian
- Born: 2 January 1989 (age 37) Rijeka, Croatia
- Height: 1.80 m (5 ft 11 in)

Sport
- Sport: Handball
- Position: Centre back
- Current club: Zamet
- Number: 17

Youth career
- Years: Team
- –: RK Trsat

Senior clubs
- Years: Team
- 2005-2009: RK Trsat
- 2009-2013: RK Matulji 2001
- 2013-2017: RK Zamet
- 2017-2018: RK Kozala
- 2018: RK Umag

Raul Valković (born 2 January 1989) is a Croatian handballer, who plays at centre back player position for RK Buzet.

He has also played for Matulji 2001, Trsat, Zamet and Kozala.

== Honours ==
Matulji 2001

- 2. HRL (West)
  - Winner (1): 2011-12
