= Petrijevci =

- Municipality
- Municipality of Petrijevci; Općina Petrijevci
- Location of Petrijevci in Croatia
- Coordinates: 45°36′57″N 18°32′28″E
- Country: Croatia
- Region: Slavonia
- County: Osijek-Baranja County

Government
  - Municipal mayor: Ivo Zelić (HDZ)

Area
  - Municipality: 57.5 km^{2} (22.2 sq mi)
  - Urban: 47.5 km^{2} (18.3 sq mi)
- Elevation: 93 m (305 ft)

Population (2021)
  - Municipality: 2,485
  - Density: 43.2/km^{2} (112/sq mi)
  - Urban: 1,948
  - Urban density: 41.0/km^{2} (106/sq mi)
- Time zone: UTC+1 (CET)
  - Summer (DST): UTC+2 (CEST)
- Postal codes: 31208 Petrijevci
- Area code: 031
- Website: petrijevci.hr

Petrijevci (Hungarian: Petróc) is a village and a municipality in Slavonia, in the Osijek-Baranja County of northeastern Croatia.

In the 2011 census, there were a total of 2,439 inhabitants, 97.39% of them Croats. There were two settlements:

- Petrijevci, population 2,299
- Satnica, population 571

== Name ==
The name of the village in Croatian is plural.

== History ==
In the late 19th and early 20th century, Petrijevci was part of the Virovitica County of the Kingdom of Croatia-Slavonia.

On 26 March 2022 at 13:35 the DVD Petrijevci received a call about a wildfire in the area. 5.5 hectares (14 acres) burned by the time it was put out at 14:11.
