= Mile Uzelac =

Croatian handballer (born 1978)

Milan Uzelac
Personal information
- Full name: Milan Uzelac
- Nationality: Croatian
- Born: 30 September 1978 (age 48) Rijeka, SFR Yugoslavia
- Height: 1.92 m (6 ft 4 in)

Sport
- Sport: Handball
- Position: Line player
- Current club: Zamet
- Number: 7

Youth career
- Years: Team
- 1991-1995: RK Kvarner

Senior clubs
- Years: Team
- 1993-1995: RK Kvarner
- 1995-1996: RK Zamet
- 1996-1999: RK Pećine
- 1997-2017: RK Zamet
- loan: → RK Gold Klub
National team
- Years: Team
- –: Croatia U-18
- –: Croatia U-19
- –: Croatia U-21

Milan Uzelac (born 30 September 1978) is a Croatian handballer, who plays as line player for RK Zamet.

== Career ==
Mile started his career in RK Kvarner. At the age of 15 he played for the senior team of RK Kvarner and he played an important role in Kvarner getting promotion form 2. league to 1.B league.

He spent a season in Zamet helping them win the league getting back in the Croatian First League and winning the Croatian U-19 Championship with players like Mirza Džomba and Renato Sulić. Next season he played for RK Pećine in the 1.B league. The following two years he played both for Zamet and Pećine due to them being in separate leagues.

Mile has spent nearly 20 years in Zamet, coming to the Croatian Cup finals three time losing twice to Zagreb and once to Metković Jambo.

He has played in European competitions EHF City Cup, EHF Cup Winners' Cup and EHF Cup throughout his career.

He was team captain of Zamet from 2003 to 2017 when he retired from handball alongside his long standing teammate Mateo Hrvatin. He is marked for being the longest serving player in Zamet's history playing 21 full years for the club.

== Honours ==
RK Kvarner

- 2. HRL - West
  - Winner (1): 1993-94

RK Zamet

- Croatian First League
  - Third (2): 1997-98, 1998-99
- 1.B HRL
  - Winner (1): 1995-96
- Croatian U-19 Championship
  - Winner (1): 1996
- Croatian Cup
  - Finalist (3): 2000, 2001, 2012
