= Matija Golik =

Croatian handball player (born 1993)

Personal information
- Nationality: Croatian
- Born: 26 May 1993 (age 33) Rijeka, Croatia
- Height: 1.86 m (6 ft 1 in)

Sport
- Sport: Handball
- Position: Centre back
- Current club: RK Umag
- Number: 32

Senior clubs
- Years: Team
- 2010–2018: RK Zamet
- 2018–2021: RK Maribor Branik
- 2021–: RK Umag

Matija Golik (born 26 May 1993) is a Croatian handballer who plays as centre back for Croatian club RK Umag.

Golik also played for eight seasons in his hometown club RK Zamet. In 2012 he helped his side reach the Croatian Cup final where they lost to Croatia Osiguranje Zagreb.
