= Luka Kovačević =

Croatian handball player (born 1992)

Personal information
- Nationality: Croatian
- Born: 1 June 1992 (age 34) Rijeka, Croatia
- Height: 1.97 m (6 ft 6 in)

Sport
- Sport: Handball
- Position: Right Back
- Number: 13

Senior clubs
- Years: Team
- 2008-2016: Zamet
- 2016-2017: ØIF Arendal
- 2017-2018: Viking HK
- 2018-: Emmen
National team
- Years: Team
- 2010-2011: Croatia U-21

Luka Kovačević (born 1 June 1992) is a Croatian handballer, who plays as right back for Swiss club Emmen.

== Career ==
Kovačević has been playing for Zamet since 2008 in Croatian Premier League the highest rank in Croatian handball.

In 2011 he played for Croatia U-21 team in the qualification phase for IHF Men's Junior World Championship which they failed to qualify for.

In 2012 Zamet came to the finals of the Croatian Cup but lost to Croatia Osiguranje Zagreb. Next season they played EHF Cup but lost in the first round to Meso Lovosica.

In 2016 Kovačević with Zamet entered Champion play-offs in the Croatian Premier League an achievement since Zamet's last play-offs were 10 years before in 2005/06 season.

== Honours ==
RK Zamet

- Croatian Cup Runner-up (1): 2012
