= Marin Đurica =

Croatian handball player (born 1991)

Personal information
- Nationality: Croatian
- Born: 17 September 1991 (age 35) Rijeka, Croatia
- Height: 1.85 m (6 ft 1 in)

Sport
- Sport: Handball
- Position: Goalkeeper
- Current club: TuS Ferndorf

Youth career
- Years: Team
- 2000–2007: RK Zamet

Senior clubs
- Years: Team
- 2007–2008: RK Zamet II
- 2008–2017: RK Zamet
- 2017–2019: RK Maribor Branik
- 2019–: TuS Ferndorf
National team
- Years: Team
- 2010–2011: Croatia U21

Marin Đurica (born 17 September 1991) is a Croatian handballer who plays as a goalkeeper for TuS Ferndorf.

He played for RK Zamet from 2008 to 2017 in the Croatian Premier League. In 2012 and 2016, he competed in the EHF Cup.

== Honours ==
=== Club ===
RK Zamet

- Croatian Cup
  - Finalist (1): 2012

RK Maribor Branik

- Slovenian Supercup
  - Finalist (1): 2017

=== Individual ===
- Best saves percentage in the 2013–14 Croatian Premier Handball League – 39,7%
- Best saves total from 9m in the 2013–14 Croatian Premier Handball League – 57,5%
