= RK Spačva Vinkovci =

Croatian handball club

- Full name: Rukometni Klub Spačva Vinkovci
- Short name: Spačva
- Founded: 1950; 75 years ago
- Arena: Sportska Dvorana Bartol Kasic, Vinkovci
- Capacity: 800
- President: Mirko Mečić
- Head coach: Josip Mečić
- League: Croatian Premier League
- Club colours
Home	Away

RK Spačva Vinkovci is a Croatian team handball club from Vinkovci, Croatia. The team plays in the Croatian Premier League.

Location of RK Spačva Vinkovci

== History ==
The club was founded in 1950 under the name RK Lokomotiva Vinkovci. In 2011, they reached the top division of Croatian handball, the Croatian Premier League, where they have been playing ever since. In the 2019/20 season, the club finished 5th in the Croatian Premier League and qualified for the 2020/21 EHF European League for the first time in the club's history. There, he was eliminated in the first round against Macedonian RK Metalurg Skopje. In the 2023/24 season, the club finished 4th in the league, 3rd in the Croatian Handball Cup and again qualified for the EHF European League.

== Crest, colours, supporters ==
=== Naming history ===
Name	Period
RK Lokomotiva Vinkovci	1950–1993
RK Croatia Vinkovci	1993–1994
RK Novoselac Vinkovci	1994–2004
RK Spačva Vinkovci	2004–present

== Team ==
=== Current squad ===
Squad for the 2024–25 season

RK Spačva Vinkovci

Goalkeepers

- 1 (Bosnia and Herzegovina) Marko Perić
- 16 (Croatia) Sandro Kolar
- 69 (Bosnia and Herzegovina) Dražen Stojanović

Left Wingers

- 2 (Croatia) Fran Zovak
- 6 (Croatia) Marin Greganić

Right Wingers

- 10 (Croatia) Marin Božičević
- 34 (Croatia) Anton Parat

Line Players

- 11 (Croatia) Ivan Lukač
- 13 (Croatia) Mislav Mendeš
- 17 (Croatia) Ivan Lasić

Left Backs

- 5 (Croatia) Borna Mažurana
- 7 (Croatia) Marko Nad
- 9 (Croatia) Josip Žulj
- 14 (Bosnia and Herzegovina) Spasoje Pekić
- 22 (Croatia) Ivan Raguž

Central Backs

- 15 (Croatia) Luka Šrajer
- 18 (Croatia) Filip Mažurana
- 24 (Croatia) Tin Kuže
- 27 (Bosnia and Herzegovina) Aleksej Stjepanović
- 39 (Croatia) Jure Rajković
- 44 (Bosnia and Herzegovina) Ranko Božić
- 45 (Croatia) Danijel Hideg

Right Backs

- 3 (Croatia) Patrik Maroš
- 36 (Croatia) Dominik Arsić

=== Technical staff ===
- Head coach: (Croatia) Josip Mečić
- Assistant coach: (Croatia) Marin Jurić
- Physiotherapist: (Croatia) Josip Radočaj
- Coach: (Croatia) Ivan Gradečak
- Coach: (Croatia) Slobodan Pekić

=== Transfers ===
Transfers for the 2024–25 season

Joining

- (Croatia) Anton Parat (RW) from (Croatia) RK Valpovo

Leaving

- (Croatia) Vlado Matanović (RW) to (Slovenia) RK Gorenje Velenje

== Previous squads ==
2020–2021 Team
Shirt No	Nationality	Player	Birth Date	Position
1	Serbia	Nikola Cirovic	22 May 2000 (age 25)	Goalkeeper
2	Croatia	Marin Jurić	13 August 1982 (age 43)	Central Back
3	Croatia	Patrik Maroš	12 May 2000 (age 25)	Right Back
4	Croatia	Ivan Liscic	22 August 2000 (age 25)	Central Back
5	Croatia	Borna Mažurana	25 August 1999 (age 26)	Left Back
6	Croatia	Karlo Vasarevic	7 October 1999 (age 26)	Left Winger
7	Croatia	Marko Nad	21 April 1991 (age 34)	Left Back
8	Croatia	David Cicak	6 September 1998 (age 27)	Right Back
10	Croatia	Marko Buntić	8 February 1997 (age 28)	Right Winger
11	Croatia	Fabijan Mihaljević	21 March 2002 (age 23)	Left Back
13	Serbia	Marko Vignjević	13 April 1998 (age 27)	Left Back
14	Croatia	Petar Ilić	28 June 1994 (age 31)	Left Winger
15	Croatia	Frane Blašković	17 August 2003 (age 22)	Right Winger
16	Bosnia and Herzegovina	Aldin Pasagic	3 October 1995 (age 30)	Goalkeeper
18	Croatia	Filip Mažurana	24 December 2001 (age 24)	Central Back
19	Croatia	Dino Vukušić	14 October 1994 (age 31)	Left Winger
22	Croatia	Mario Antunovic	27 August 1998 (age 27)	Left Back
31	Croatia	Rene Mihaljević	31 October 1997 (age 28)	Line Player
36	Croatia	Matko Bolanca	22 September 1998 (age 27)	Line Player
39	Serbia	Danilo Radović	14 June 2000 (age 25)	Left Back
44	Bosnia and Herzegovina	Ranko Božić	27 April 1996 (age 29)	Central Back
45	Croatia	Matej Radovic	7 October 1997 (age 28)	Left Winger
69	Croatia	Marko Romic	19 June 2000 (age 25)	Goalkeeper
83	Croatia	Domagoj Nedić	7 September 1994 (age 31)	Central Back

== Accomplishments ==
- Croatian Handball Cup:
  - Bronze: 2024

== EHF ranking ==
As of 05/12/2025

Rank	Team	Points
150	(Estonia) Viljandi HC	26
151	(Spain) BM Cuenca	26
152	(Faroe Islands) VÍF	26
153	(Croatia) RK Spačva Vinkovci	26
154	(Kosovo) KH Kastrioti	25
155	(Italy) Pallamano Conversano	25
156	(Germany) SC DHfK Leipzig	25

== Former club members ==
=== Notable former players ===
==== Right wingers ====
- (Croatia) Vlado Matanović (2023–2024)

==== Left backs ====
- (Serbia) Danilo Radović (2019–2021)
- (Serbia) Marko Vignjević (2017–2022)

==== Central backs ====
- (Croatia) Tihomir Baltić (2013–2014)
