= Centar Zamet =

Mixed-use sports hall in Rijeka, Croatia

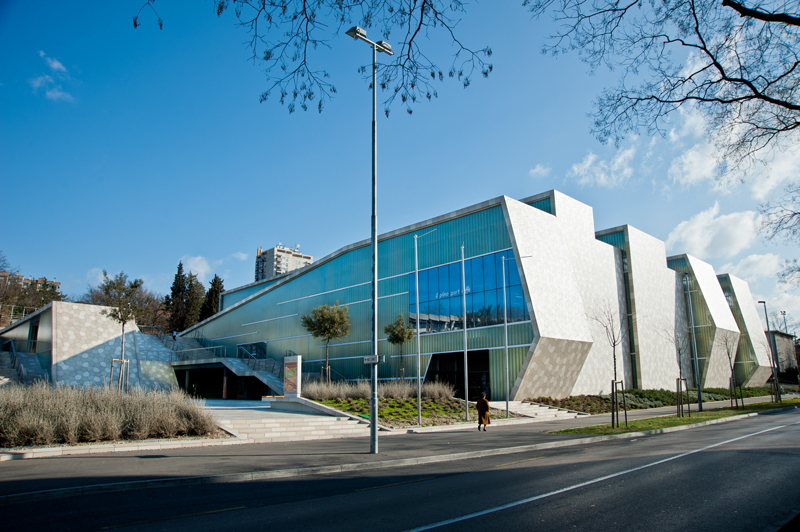
- Interactive map of Centar Zamet
- Location: Rijeka, Croatia
- Coordinates: 45.3443851°N 14.3836658°E
- Owner: City of Rijeka
- Capacity: 2,350

Construction
- Groundbreaking: December 2007
- Opened: October 2009
- Cost: €20 million

Tenants
- RK Zamet (2009–present); ŽRK Zamet (2009–present); KK Zamet (2009–present)

Centar Zamet (English: Centre Zamet), also rendered in English as Zamet Sports Centre, is a mixed-use sports hall in the Zamet neighbourhood of Rijeka, Croatia, that hosts sporting, cultural, business and entertainment events.

The hall was built in Zamet in 2009. The size of the hall is 16,830 square metres (181,200 sq ft) and the surface of the outer space is 88,075 square metres (948,030 sq ft).

== Awards ==
- Vladimir Nazor Award yearly award for 2009 - Architecture and urbanism (2010)
- ArchDaily - "Building of the Year 2009" (2010)
- Bernardo Bernardi Award (2010)
- IOC / IAKS Award Silver medal (2011)

== Events held ==
=== Sports events ===
- European Individual Chess Championship - men and women (2010)
- World Junior Championships - men and women (2010)
- World Cadet Championships - men and women (2010)

=== Music events ===
- Porin Award (2012)

=== Concerts ===
- Klapa Intrade & Tomislav Bralić (2009)
- Maksim Mrvica (2010)
- Klape na Zametu (2010)
- Massimo na Dan Žena (2011)
- Parni Valjak "Unplugged" (2013)
- Lord of the Dance (2015)
- Marko Tolja (2015)
- Massimo Savić (2016)
- Miroslav Škoro - "Mene zovu tambure" (2016)
- Damir Kedžo (2016)
- Massimo - Valentine's Day (2020)
- Aleksandra Prijović - Od istoka do zapada (2024)
