= RK Poreč =

Croatian handball club

- Full name: Rukometni Klub Poreč
- Short name: Poreč
- Founded: 1968; 58 years ago
- Arena: Žatika Sport Centre, Poreč
- Capacity: 3700
- Head coach: Ilija Lovrinovic
- League: Croatian Premier League
- Club colours
Home	Away

RK Poreč is a Croatian team handball club from Poreč, Croatia. The team plays in the Croatian Premier League.

Location of RK Poreč

== History ==
The club was founded on June 20, 1968. The club played in the regional leagues for a long time and only reached the first level, the Croatian Premier League, in the 2003/2004 season. Poreč competed in a European cup for the first time in the club's history in the 2006/2007 EHF Challenge Cup. In 2011, the club reached the final of the Croatian Handball Cup for the first time, where they failed to thwart the hegemony of RK Zagreb.

Poreč achieved third place in the league in 2021 and qualified for the EHF European League.

== Crest, colours, supporters ==
=== Kits ===
HOME
2015–16	2022–24

AWAY
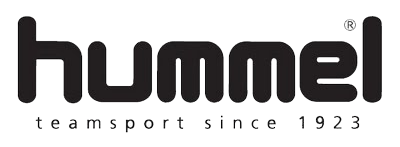
2022–24

== Team ==
=== Current squad ===
Squad for the 2024–25 season

RK Poreč

Goalkeepers

- 1 (Croatia) Ves Aleksić
- 16 (Croatia) David Vladić
- 22 (Croatia) Bruno Čopić

Left Wingers

- 20 (Croatia) Matija Radakovic
- 37 (Croatia) Marko Bajan

Right Wingers

- 10 (Croatia) Leon Rušnjak
- 77 (Croatia) Diego Jelić

Line Players

- 18 (Croatia) Luka Malinarich
- 46 (Croatia) Andy Zikovic
- 81 (Croatia) Teo Čorić
- 88 (Croatia) Antonio Ljubić

Left Backs

- 13 (Croatia) Mirko Petrov
- 14 (Croatia) Rejan Sulejmani
- 19 (Croatia) Teo Popović
- 23 (Croatia) Lovro Jaman

Central Backs

- 7 (Croatia) Karlo Varljen
- 15 (Croatia) Martin Sebastiano Boka
- 34 (Croatia) Nikola Ivanković
- 44 (Croatia) Tin Božić

Right Backs

- 17 (Croatia) Petar Krupić
- 32 (Croatia) Arman Ikanović

=== Technical staff ===
- Head coach: (Croatia) Ilija Lovrinovic
- Goalkeeping coach: (Croatia) Želimir Popovic
- Physiotherapist: (Croatia) Josip Žarković
- Coach: (Croatia) Vedran Mataija

=== Transfers ===
Transfers for the 2026–27 season

Joining

Leaving

- (Croatia) Antonio Ljubić (LP) to (Romania) SCM Politehnica Timișoara

=== Transfer History ===
Transfers for the 2025–26 season

Joining

- (Croatia) Moreno Car (GK) from (Croatia) RK Nexe Našice

Leaving

- (Croatia) Moreno Car (GK) to (Switzerland) Kadetten Schaffhausen
- (Croatia) David Vladić (GK) to (Spain) AD Ciudad de Guadalajara

Transfers for the 2024–25 season

Joining

- (Croatia) Lovro Jaman (LB) from (Croatia) RK Dubovac-Gaza
- (Croatia) Tin Božić (CB) from (Croatia) RK Mornar-Crikvenica

Leaving

- (Croatia) Vedran Mataija (LW) (retires)
- (Croatia) Matija Car (RW) to (Austria) HC Linz AG
- (Croatia) Lucijan Krajcar (LB) to (Croatia) RK Nexe Našice
- (Croatia) Petar Krupić (RB) to (Croatia) RK Nexe Našice

== Accomplishments ==
- Croatian Premier Handball League:
  - Bronze: 2022, 2023
- Croatian Handball Cup:
  - Silver: 2011, 2013

== EHF ranking ==
As of 05/12/2025

Rank	Team	Points
97	(Bosnia and Herzegovina) RK Sloboda	50
98	(Turkey) Spor Toto SC Ankara	50
99	(Greece) Bianco Monte Drama 1986	50
100	(Croatia) RK Poreč	48
101	(Spain) BM Logroño La Rioja	47
102	(Luxembourg) HB Dudelange	47
103	(Lithuania) VHC Šviesa Vilnius	47

== Former club members ==
=== Notable former players ===
==== Goalkeepers ====
- (Croatia) Moreno Car (2015–2018)
- (Croatia) Goran Čarapina (2008–2010, 2012–2017)
- (Croatia) Mario Cvitković (2012–2014)
- (Croatia) Valter Matošević (2005–2006)
- (Croatia) Ivan Stevanović (2007–2009)
- (Serbia) Željko Hornjak

==== Right wingers ====
- (Croatia) Filip Glavaš (2020–2021)

==== Left wingers ====
- (Croatia) Vedran Mataija (2006–2011, 2013–2024)

==== Line players ====
- (Croatia) Teo Čorić (2011–2013, 2023–)
- (Croatia) Tomislav Huljina
- (Croatia) Tomislav Kušan (2016–2017)
- (Croatia) Gianfranco Pribetić (2017–2019)
- (Bosnia and Herzegovina) Vladislav Veselinov (2006–2007)
- (Hungary) (Croatia) Petar Topic (2013–2015)

==== Left backs ====
- (Croatia) David Miličević
- (Italy) (Croatia) Dean Turković (2006–2010)

==== Central backs ====
- (Croatia) Krešimir Maraković (2008–2009)
- (Serbia) (Croatia) Stefan Vujić (2009-2012)

==== Right backs ====
- (Croatia) Marko Buvinić (2012–2015)
