= 2008–09 RK Zamet season =

Zamet Rijeka
2008-09 season
- President: Zlatko Kolić
- Coach: Drago Žiljak
- Venue: Dvorana Mladosti; Dvorana Dinko Lukarić
- Dukat Premier League: 14th
- Croatian Cup: Round of 16
- Highest home attendance: 2,000 vs (Croatia) CO Zagreb (10 March 2009 - Dvorana Mladosti)
- Lowest home attendance: 150 vs (Croatia) Metković 1963 (18 October 2008 - Dvorana Dinko Lukarić)
Home colours	Away colours

The 2008–09 season was the 52nd season in RK Zamet’s history. It is their 1st successive season in the Dukat Premier League, and 32nd successive top tier season.

== First team squad ==
Goalkeeper

- 1 (Croatia) Damir Bobanović
- 12 (Croatia) Ivan Karabatić
- 16 (Croatia) Marin Đurica

Wingers
RW

- 4 (Croatia) Davor Vukelić
- 6 (Croatia) Dario Černeka

LW

- 4 (Croatia) Mateo Hrvatin
- 14 (Croatia) Marko Erstić
- 22 (Croatia) Damir Vučko

Line players

- 8 (Croatia) Krešimir Kozina
- 11 (Croatia) Mirjan Horvat
- 19 (Croatia) Marin Sakić

Back players
LB

- 3 (Croatia) Luka Tandara
- 4 (Croatia) Frane Bukvić
- 13 (Croatia) Nikola Babić
- 20 (Croatia) Marko Vidović

CB

- 9 (Croatia) Ivan Ćosić
- 10 (Croatia) Dalibor Prokopić
- 18 (Croatia) Milan Kosanović

RB

- 2 (Croatia) Luka Kovačević
- 7 (Croatia) Milan Uzelac (captain)
- 15 (Croatia) Marin Kružić
- 19 (Croatia) Luka Bracanović
- 20 (Croatia) Andrej Sekulić

Reserve players

- GK (Croatia) Dino Slavić
- CB (Croatia) Bruno Kozina
- LP (Croatia) Marko Kačanić

=== Left during season ===
- LB (Croatia) Andrej Sekulić
- LW (Croatia) Mateo Hrvatin

=== Technical staff ===
- (Croatia) President: Zlatko Kolić
- (Croatia) Vice-president: Željko Jovanović
- (Croatia) Sports director: Alvaro Načinović
- (Croatia) Club secretary: Daniela Juriša
- (Croatia) Head Coach: Drago Žiljak
- (Croatia) Assistant Coach: Marin Mišković
- (Croatia) Goalkeeper Coach: Igor Dokmanović
- (Croatia) Fitness Coach: Emil Baltić
- (Croatia) Fizioterapist: Branimir Maričević
- (Croatia) Tehniko: Williams Černeka

== Competitions ==
=== Overall ===
Competition	First match	Last match	Starting round	Final position	Record							
Competition	First match	Last match	Starting round	Final position	G	W	D	L	GF	GA	GD	Win %
Dukat Premier League	14 September 2008	30 May 2009	Matchday 1	14th	30	9	2	19	776	858	−82	30.00
Croatian Cup	1 December 2010	8 February 2011	Qualifying Round	Round of 16	2	1	0	1	56	57	−1	50.00
Total					32	10	2	20	832	915	−83	31.25

== Dukat Premier League ==
=== League table ===
Pos.	Team	Pld.	W	D	L	Goal+	Goal-	Pts.
1.	Croatia Osiguranje Zagreb	30	30	0	0	1171	708	60
2.	NEXE Našice	30	20	6	4	963	790	46
3.	Metković 1963	30	20	3	7	907	869	43
4.	Siscia	30	16	7	7	815	757	39
5.	Varteks Di Caprio	30	16	1	13	862	882	33
6.	Međimurje Čakovec	30	14	2	14	857	845	30
7.	Karlovac	30	12	6	12	815	819	30
8.	Split	30	12	3	15	728	811	27
9.	Poreč	30	10	5	15	788	831	25
10.	Osijek	30	11	3	16	766	846	25
11.	Moslavina Kutina	30	11	2	17	804	895	24
12.	Medveščak NFD Zagreb	30	10	3	17	726	810	23
13.	Bjelovar	30	10	2	18	786	840	22
14.	Zamet Rijeka	30	9	2	19	776	858	20
15.	Umag	30	8	2	20	811	884	18
16.	Dubrava Zagreb	30	7	1	22	871	1001	15

Source: SportNet.hr

=== Matches ===
13 September 2008 1	Zamet	34:29	Dubrava	Rijeka
18:00 CEST		Report		Stadium: Dvorana Dinko Lukarić; Attendance: 300; Referee: Dalibor Jurinović (Zadar) & Marko Mrvica (Biograd na Moru)

21 September 2008 2	Poreč	22:20	Zamet	Poreč
18:00 CEST		Report		Stadium: SRC Veli Jože; Attendance: 300

27 September 2008 3	Zamet	30:27	Moslavina Kutina	Rijeka
18:00 CEST		Report		Stadium: Dvorana Dinko Lukarić; Attendance: 400; Referee: Damir Sarajlić (Velika Gorica) & Vladimir Sokol (Varaždin)

4 October 2008 4	Zamet	29:29	Medveščak NFD Zagreb	Rijeka
18:00 CEST		Report		Stadium: Dvorana Dinko Lukarić; Attendance: 350; Referee: ražen Gladović & Goran Volenik (Virovitica)

14 October 2008 5	Croatia Osiguranje Zagreb	35:25	Zamet	Zagreb
18:00 CEST		Report		Stadium: Kutija Šibica; Referee: 500

18 October 2008 6	Zamet	28:34	Metković 1963	Rijeka
18:00 CEST		Report		Stadium: Dvorana Dinko Lukarić; Attendance: 150; Referee: Dražen Bajt (Dugo Selo) & Davor Tor (Zagreb)

25 October 2008 7	Međimurje Čakovec	34:28	Zamet	Čakovec
18:00 CEST		Report		Stadium: Dvorana Građevinske Škole; Attendance: 300; Referee: Tihomir Kasunić & Dražen Matovina (Karlovac)

8 November 2008 8	Zamet	21:23	Karlovac	Rijeka
18:00 CEST		Report		Stadium: Dvorana Dinko Lukarić; Attendance: 300; Referee: Hrvoje Lovrić & Vjekoslav Petković (Zagreb)

15 November 2008 9	Bjelovar	28:27	Zamet	Bjelovar
18:00 CEST		Report		Stadium: ŠSD Bjelovar; Attendance: 800; Referee: Robert Kober (Zagreb) & Igor Sunajko (Dugo Selo)

22 November 2008 10	Zamet	27:25	Varteks Di Caprio	Rijeka
17:30 CEST		Report		Stadium: Dvorana Dinko Lukarić; Attendance: 400; Referee: Tomislav Cindrić & Robert Gonzurek (Osijek)

6 December 2008 11	Split	23:22	Zamet	Split
18:00 CEST		Report		Stadium: SC Gripe; Attendance: 350

10 December 2008 12	Zamet	23:22	Siscia	Rijeka
18:00 CEST		Report		Stadium: Dvorana Dinko Lukarić; Attendance: 300; Referee: Robert Kober (Zagreb) & Igor Sunajko (Dugo Selo)

13 December 2008 13	Umag	33:29	Zamet	Umag
18:00 CEST		Report		Stadium: SD Stella Maris; Attendance: 500; Referee: Matija Gubica (Petrijevci) & Boris Milošević (Osijek)

17 December 2008 14	Zamet	26:35	NEXE Našice	Rijeka
18:30 CEST		Report		Stadium: Dvorana Mladosti; Attendance: 750

20 December 2008 15	Osijek	25:24	Zamet	Osijek
18:30 CEST		Report		Stadium: Zrinjevac Sport Hall; Attendance: 500

7 February 2009 16	Dubrava Zagreb	22:23	Zamet	Zagreb
18:00 CEST		Report		Stadium: ŠD Dubrava; Attendance: 200

14 February 2009 17	Zamet	24:33	RK Poreč	Rijeka
18:00 CEST		Report		Stadium: Dvorana Dinko Lukarić; Attendance: 250

21 February 2009 18	Moslavina Kutina	27:24	Zamet	Kutina
19:00 CEST		Report		Stadium: ŠC Kutina; Attendance: 500; Referee: Dalibor Jurinović (Zadar) & Marko Mrvica (Biograd na moru)

28 February 2009 19	Medveščak NFD Zagreb	21:20	Zamet	Zagreb
18:00 CEST		Report		Stadium: Kutija Šibica; Attendance: 350

10 March 2009 20	Zamet	19:43	Croatia Osiguranje Zagreb	Rijeka
18:00 CEST		Report		Stadium: Dvorana Mladosti; Attendance: 2,000

14 March 2009 21	Metković 1963	34:29	Zamet	Metković
19:00 CEST		Report		Stadium: Gimnazija Metković; Attendance: 1,100

28 March 2009 22	Zamet	26:24	Međimurje Čakovec	Rijeka
17:30 CEST		Report		Stadium: Dvorana Dinko Lukarić; Attendance: 400

4 April 2009 23	Karlovac	23:23	Zamet	Karlovac
18:00 CEST		Report		Stadium: Dvorana Mladost; Attendance: 500

18 April 2009 24	Zamet	23:26	Bjelovar	Rijeka
18:00 CEST		Report		Stadium: Dvorana Mladosti; Attendance: 450

25 April 2009 25	Varteks Di Caprio	27:24	Zamet	Varaždin
19:00 CEST		Report		Stadium: Varaždin Arena; Attendance: 900

2 May 2009 26	Zamet	25:17	Split	Rijeka
18:00 CEST		Report		Stadium: Dvorana Mladosti; Attendance: 400

2 May 2009 27	Siscia	37:29	Zamet	Sisak
18:00 CEST		Report		Stadium: SD Brezovica; Attendance: 600

9 May 2009 28	Zamet	28:27	Umag	Rijeka
18:00 CEST		Report		Stadium: Dvorana Mladosti; Attendance: 400

23 May 2009 29	NEXE Našice	38:30	Zamet	Našice
18:00 CEST		Report		Stadium: ŠŠD Kralja Tomislava; Attendance: 400

30 May 2009 30	Zamet	26:25	Osijek	Rijeka
18:00 CEST		Report		Stadium: Dvorana Dinko Lukarić; Attendance: 400

Source: SportNet.hr

== Croatian Cup ==
=== West Region Cup - Qualifiers ===
2 December 2010 Final	Crikvenica	26:30	Zamet	Crikvenica
17:30 CEST (UTC+02:00)		Report		Stadium: GSD Crikvenica; Attendance: 200

=== Matches ===
5 March 2009 Round of 16	Bjelovar	31:26	Zamet	Bjelovar
18:30 CEST (UTC+02:00)		Report		Stadium: ŠŠD Bjelovar; Attendance: 600

Source: Hrs.hr

== Friendlies ==
=== Pre-season ===
1 September 2008 Friendly	Zamet	20:20	Umag	Crikvenica
14:00 CEST		Report		Stadium: GSD Crikvenica

1 September 2008 Friendly	Jeruzalem Ormož (Slovenia)	31:27	(Croatia) Zamet	Crikvenica
17:00 CEST		Report		Stadium: GSD Crikvenica

3 September 2008 Friendly	Zamet	21:24	Buzet	Rijeka
18:30 CEST		Report		Stadium: Dvorana Mladosti

=== Memorial Robert Barbić "Beli" ===
7 September 2008 Semi final	Zamet	32:31 (7m)	Buzet	Senj
14:30 CEST		Report		Stadium: SD Senj; Attendance: 120

7 September 2008 Final	Zamet	27:26	Senj	Senj
17:30 CEST		Report		Stadium: SD Senj

=== Mid-season ===
15 January 2009 Friendly	Zamet	30:39	Crikvenica	Rijeka
16:30 CEST		Report		Stadium: Dvorana Mladosti

Source: SportNet.hr

== Transfers ==
=== In ===
Date	Position	Player	From	To
1 August 2008	GK	(Croatia) Ivan Karabatić	(Croatia) Varteks Di Caprio	Zamet
5 August 2008	LB	(Croatia) Luka Tandara	(Croatia) RK Bjelovar	Zamet

=== Out ===
Date	Position	Player	From	To
8 June 2008	LB	(Croatia) Jakov Gojun	(Croatia) Zamet	(Croatia) Siscia
1 September 2008	CB	(Croatia) Marijan Bašić	(Croatia) Zamet	(Croatia) Umag
2 January 2009	RB	(Croatia) Andrej Sekulić	(Croatia) Zamet	(Croatia) Bjelovar
1 February 2009	LW	(Croatia) Mateo Hrvatin	(Croatia) Zamet	(Croatia) CO Zagreb

Source: SportNet.hr

== Sources ==
- HRS
- Sport.net.hr
- Rk-zamet.hr
- Rijeka.hr
