= 2007–08 RK Zamet season =

Zamet Rijeka
2007-08 season
- President: Zlatko Kolić
- Coach: Drago Žiljak
- Venue: Dvorana Mladosti; Dvorana Dinko Lukarić
- Dukat 1.HRL: 8th
- Croatian Cup: Quarter-final
- Highest home attendance: 500 vs (Croatia) CO Zagreb (11 April 2008 - Dvorana Dinko Lukarić)
- Lowest home attendance: 150 vs (Croatia) Gorica (23 February 2008 - Dvorana Mladosti)

The 2007–08 season was the 51st season in RK Zamet’s history. It is their 7th successive season in the Dukat 1.HRL, and 31st successive top tier season.

== First team squad ==
Goalkeeper

- 1 (Croatia) Damir Bobanović
- 12 (Croatia) Igor Dokmanović
- 16 (Croatia) Ivan Pešić

Wingers
RW

- 6 (Croatia) Dario Černeka
- 13 (Croatia) Josip Crnić

LW

- 4 (Croatia) Mateo Hrvatin
- 14 (Croatia) Marko Erstić
- 22 (Croatia) Damir Vučko

Line players

- 8 (Croatia) Krešimir Kozina
- 11 (Croatia) Mirjan Horvat
- 19 (Croatia) Marin Sakić

Back players
LB

- 9 (Croatia) Ivan Ćosić
- 10 (Croatia) Jakov Gojun
- 17 (Croatia) Andrej Sekulić
- 18 (Croatia) Nikola Kosanović
- 20 (Croatia) Marko Vidović
- 21 (Croatia) Frane Bukvić

CB

- 2 (Croatia) Dalibor Prokopić
- 5 (Croatia) Marijan Bašić

RB

- 3 (Croatia) Marko Zelić
- 7 (Croatia) Milan Uzelac (captain)
- 15 (Croatia) Marin Kružić
- 19 (Croatia) Luka Bracanovic
- 20 (Croatia) Andrej Sekulić
- 22 (Croatia) Luka Kovačević

=== Technical staff ===
- (Croatia) President: Zlatko Kolić
- (Croatia) Vice-president: Željko Jovanović
- (Croatia) Sports director: Alvaro Načinović
- (Croatia) Club secretary: Daniela Juriša
- (Croatia) Head Coach: Drago Žiljak
- (Croatia) Assistant Coach: Marin Mišković
- (Croatia) Goalkeeper Coach: Igor Dokmanović
- (Croatia) Fitness Coach: Emil Baltić
- (Croatia) Fizioterapist: Branimir Maričević
- (Croatia) Tehniko: Williams Černeka

== Competitions ==
=== Overall ===
Competition	First match	Last match	Starting round	Final position	Record							
Competition	First match	Last match	Starting round	Final position	G	W	D	L	GF	GA	GD	Win %
Dukat 1.HRL	9 September 2007	3 May 2008	Matchday 1	8th	30	15	0	15	814	813	+1	50.00
Croatian Cup	2 February 2008	26 March 2008	Round of 16	Quarter-final	2	1	0	1	56	55	+1	50.00
Total					32	16	0	16	870	868	+2	50.00

== Dukat 1.HRL ==
=== League table ===
Pos.	Team	Pld.	W	D	L	Goal+	Goal-	Pts.
1.	Croatia Osiguranje Zagreb	30	29	1	0	1185	759	59
2.	Perutnina PIPO IPC Čakovec	30	20	2	8	1006	912	42
3.	NEXE Našice	30	19	3	8	1030	920	41
4.	Poreč	30	17	3	10	952	868	37
5.	Karlovac	30	15	1	14	831	805	31
6.	Siscia	30	15	1	14	899	880	31
7.	Dubrava Zagreb	30	15	1	14	983	992	31
8.	Zamet	30	15	0	15	814	813	30
9.	Varteks Di Caprio	30	14	1	15	803	819	29
10.	Moslavina Kutina	30	14	1	15	866	884	29
11.	Split Koteks	30	13	2	15	868	883	28
12.	Osijek	30	13	1	16	804	802	27
13.	Metković	30	12	3	15	869	921	27
14.	Medveščak NFD Zagreb	30	12	0	18	802	828	24
15.	Bjelovar	30	4	1	25	768	996	9
16.	Gorica	30	2	1	27	638	1036	5

Source: SportNet.hr

=== Matches ===
Round	Date	Venue	Opponent	Score	Attendance	Referee	Report
1	9 Sep	A	Medveščak NFD	24:29	400	Gladović & Volenik	Hrs.hr
2	15 Sep	H	Split Koteks	31:26	250	Mišan & Modesto	Sportnet.rtl.hr
3	19 Sep	A	Gorica	23:29	150	Cindrić & Gonzurek	Hrs.hr
4	22 Sep	H	Osijek	28:26	450	Ladić & Mraz	Hrs.hr
5	29 Sep	A	Moslavina	37:30	200	Mišan & Modesto	Hrs.hr
6	5 Oct	H	Metković	23:24	400	Sarajilić & Vukušić	Hrs.hr
7	14 Oct	A	Karlovac	31:28	700	Gubica & Milošević	Hrs.hr
8	20 Oct	H	Dubrava	29:24	150	Posavec & Sokol	Hrs.hr
9	3 Nov	A	Siscia	28:27	1,000	Cindrić & Gonzurek	Hrs.hr
10	13 Nov	A	CO Zagreb	37:22	200	Cindrić & Gonzurek	Rk-zagreb.hr
11	17 Nov	H	RK Bjelovar	28:26	300	Cupek & Kožuhar	Hrs.hr
12	28 Nov	A	PIPO IPC	40:29	300	Barle & Vučić	Sportnet.rtl.hr
13	1 Dec	H	NEXE Našice	29:26	300	Goreta & Medved	Hrs.hr
14	5 Dec	A	Varteks Di Caprio	19:15	250	Jurinović & Mrvica	Hrs.hr
15	12 Dec	H	Poreč	23:24	250	Bajt & Tor	Hrs.hr
16	9 Feb	H	Medveščak NFD	24:23	400	Kasunić & Matovina	Hrs.hr
17	16 Feb	A	Split Koteks	22:18	150	Bajt & Tor	Hrs.hr
18	23 Feb	H	Gorica	36:23	150	Cepanec & Jeftić	Hrs.hr
19	1 Mar	A	Osijek	28:21	250	Barle & Vučić	Hrs.hr
20	8 Mar	H	Moslavina	31:23	300	Bajt & Tor	Hrs.hr
21	15 Mar	A	Metković	29:24	250	Kasunić & Matovina	Hrs.hr
22	29 Mar	H	Karlovac	23:18	200	Sarajilić & Vukušić	Hrs.hr
23	5 Apr	A	Dubrava	37:29	300	Gubica & Milošević	Hrs.hr
24	9 Apr	H	Siscia	30:27	200	Gubica & Milošević	Hrs.hr
25	11 Apr	H	CO Zagreb	29:38	500	Mišan & Modesto	Hrs.hr
26	19 Apr	A	Bjelovar	24:36	150	Kober & Sunajko	Hrs.hr
27	23 Apr	H	PIPO IPC	35:26	200	Sokol & Posavec	Hrs.hr
28	26 Apr	A	NEXE Našice	32:30	400	Mišan & Modesto	Hrs.hr
29	30 Apr	H	Varteks Di Caprio	32:30	200	Sarajilić & Vukušić	Hrs.hr
30	3 May	A	Poreč	29:22	300	Gladović & Volenik	Hrs.hr

Source: Hrs.hr

== Croatian Cup ==
Round	Date	Venue	Opponent	Score	Attendance	Referee	Report
R of 16	2 Feb	H	Moslavina	25:20	200		Hrs.hr
QF	26 Mar	A	NEXE Našice	35:31	400		Sportnet.rtl.hr

Source: Hrs.hrSource: Sportnet.rtl.hr

== Friendly matches ==
27 May 2008 Friendly	Zamet (Croatia)	v	(Montenegro) Lovćen Cetinje	Rijeka
CEST		Report		Stadium: Dvorana Mladosti

== Transfers ==
=== In ===
Date	Position	Player	From	To
August 2007	RB	(Croatia) Marin Kružić	(Croatia) Kvarner Kostrena	Zamet
December 2007	LB	(Croatia) Andrej Sekulić	(Croatia) Bjelovar	Zamet

=== Out ===
Date	Position	Player	From	To
June 2008	RW	(Croatia) Josip Crnić	(Croatia) Zamet	(Croatia) PIPO IPC

== Sources ==
- HRS
- Sport.net.hr
- Rk-zamet.hr
- Rijeka.hr
