= 2009–10 RK Zamet season =

Zamet Rijeka
2009–10 season
- President: Zlatko Kolić
- Coach: Damir Čavlović
- Venue: Centar Zamet
- Dukat Premier League: 12th
- Croatian Cup: Round of 16
- Highest home attendance: 2,000 vs (Croatia) CO Zagreb (16 February 2010 – Centar Zamet)
- Lowest home attendance: 200 vs (Croatia) Siscia (15 May 2010 – Dvorana Mladosti)
Home colours	Away colours

The 2009–10 season was the 53rd season in RK Zamet’s history. It is their 2nd successive season in the Dukat Premier League, and 33rd successive top tier season.

== First team squad ==
Goalkeeper

- 1 (Croatia) Dino Slavić
- 12 (Croatia) Marin Ðurica
- 16 (Croatia) Valter Matošević

Wingers
RW

- 6 (Croatia) Dario Černeka

LW

- 2 (Croatia) Damir Vučko
- 4 (Croatia) Mateo Hrvatin

Line players

- 7 (Croatia) Milan Uzelac (captain)
- 14 (Croatia) Marin Zubčić
- 15 (Croatia) Krešimir Kozina

Back players
LB

- 5 (Croatia) Luka Tandara
- 17 (Croatia) Nikola Babić

CB

- 3 (Croatia) Marin Sakić
- 9 (Croatia) Bruno Kozina
- 18 (Croatia) Matija Golik

RB

- 11 (Croatia) Marin Kružić
- 13 (Croatia) Luka Kovacević
- 19 (Croatia) Luka Bracanovic

Source: rukometstat.com

Source: rijekadanas.com

=== Technical staff ===
- (Croatia) President: Zlatko Kolić
- (Croatia) Vice-president: Željko Jovanović
- (Croatia) Sports director: Aleksandar Cupić
- (Croatia) Head Coach: Damir Čavlović
- (Croatia) Assistant Coach: Marin Mišković
- (Croatia) Goalkeeper Coach: Valter Matošević
- (Croatia) Fitness Coach: Branimir Maričević
- (Croatia) Tehniko: Williams Černeka

== Competitions ==
=== Overall ===
Competition	First match	Last match	Starting round	Final position	Record							
Competition	First match	Last match	Starting round	Final position	G	W	D	L	GF	GA	GD	Win %
Dukat Premier League	12 September 2009	26 May 2010	Matchday 1	12th	30	10	3	17	808	856	−48	33.33
Croatian Cup	1 December 2010	8 February 2011	Qualifying Round	Round of 16	2	1	0	1	59	74	−15	50.00
Total					32	11	3	18	867	930	−63	34.38

== Dukat Premier League ==
=== League table ===
Pos.	Team	Pld.	W	D	L	Goal+	Goal-	Pts.
1.	Croatia Osiguranje Zagreb	30	30	0	0	1137	750	60
2.	NEXE Našice	30	24	1	5	1044	809	49
3.	Siscia Sisak	30	19	2	9	878	812	40
4.	MKA IPC Čakovec	30	17	3	10	886	826	37
5.	Poreč	30	17	2	11	863	823	36
6.	Buzet	30	13	5	12	780	793	31
7.	Karlovac	30	12	3	15	788	839	27
8.	Dubrava Zagreb	30	12	3	15	820	905	27
9.	Metković	30	11	4	15	788	859	25
10.	Bjelovar	30	11	2	17	821	868	24
11.	EMC Split	30	10	4	16	822	906	24
12.	Zamet	30	10	3	17	808	856	23
13.	Varteks Di Caprio	30	8	6	16	853	954	22
14.	Medvešcak NFD Zagreb	30	10	1	19	805	891	21
15.	Moslavina Kutina	30	9	3	18	810	902	21
16.	Osijek Elektromodul	30	6	0	24	843	959	12

Source: SportNet.hr

=== Matches ===
12 September 2009 1	Zamet	24:22	Moslavina Kutina	Rijeka
18:30 CEST		Report		Stadium: Centar Zamet; Attendance: 1,000; Referee: Dalibor Jurinović (Zadar) i Marko Mrvica (Biograd na Moru)

19 September 2009 2	Osijek Elektromodul	27:24	Zamet	Osijek
18:00 CEST		Report		Stadium: SD Zrinjevac; Attendance: 150; Referee: Robert Kober (Zagreb) & Igor Sunajko (Dugo Selo)

23 September 2009 3	Zamet	19:34	Croatia Osiguranje Zagreb	Rijeka
18:00 CEST		Report		Stadium: Centar Zamet; Attendance: 1,800; Referee: Igor Barle & Saša Vučić (Zagreb)

26 September 2009 4	Zamet	28:23	Karlovac	Rijeka
18:00 CEST		Report		Stadium: Centar Zamet; Attendance: 800; Referee: Robert Kober (Zagreb) & Igor Sunajko (Dugo Selo)

3 October 2009 5	NEXE Našice	38:26	Zamet	Našice
19:00 CEST		Report		Stadium: SD Kralj Tomislav; Attendance: 500

10 October 2009 6	Buzet	28:28	Zamet	Buzet
18:30 CEST		Report		Stadium: SD Buzet; Attendance: 500

17 October 2009 7	Varteks Di Caprio	30:30	Zamet	Varaždin
18:30 CEST		Report		Stadium: GD Varaždin; Attendance: 300

24 October 2009 8	Zamet	25:22	Međimurje Čakovec	Rijeka
18:00 CEST		Report		Stadium: Centar Zamet; Attendance: 350

7 November 2009 9	Dubrava Zagreb	29:27	Zamet	Zagreb
19:00 CEST		Report		Stadium: SD Dubrava; Attendance: 200

14 November 2009 10	Zamet	28:20	EMC Split	Rijeka
19:00 CEST		Report		Stadium: Centar Zamet; Attendance: 400

21 November 2009 11	Bjelovar	25:22	Zamet	Bjelovar
18:00 CEST		Report		Stadium: ŠSD Bjelovar; Attendance: 500

28 November 2009 12	Zamet	30:26	Medveščak NFD	Rijeka
18:00 CEST		Report		Stadium: Centar Zamet; Attendance: 270

6 December 2009 13	Metković	26:25	Zamet	Metković
17:30 CEST		Report		Stadium: ŠD Metković; Attendance: 300

12 December 2009 14	Zamet	29:29	Poreč	Rijeka
18:00 CEST		Report		Stadium: Centar Zamet; Attendance: 700

19 December 2009 15	Siscia	29:18	Zamet	Sisak
18:30 CEST		Report		Stadium: SD Brezovica; Attendance: 500

6 February 2010 16	Moslavina Kutina	29:34	Zamet	Kutina
18:00 CEST		Report		Stadium: SC Kutina; Attendance: 200; Referee: Tomislav Cindrić & Robert Gonzurek

16 February 2010 17	Croatia Osiguranje Zagreb	37:26	Zamet	Rijeka
18:00 CEST		Report		Stadium: Centar Zamet; Attendance: 2,000

24 February 2010 18	Zamet	30:25	Osijek Elektromodul	Rijeka
18:00 CEST		Report		Stadium: Centar Zamet; Attendance: 450; Referee: Ivica Glavinić & Mile Veraja

27 February 2010 19	Karlovac	27:23	Zamet	Karlovac
18:00 CEST		Report		Stadium: Dvorana Mladost; Attendance: 500

6 March 2010 20	Zamet	21:32	NEXE Našice	Rijeka
18:00 CEST		Report		Stadium: Dvorana Dinko Lukarić; Attendance: 500

13 March 2010 21	Buzet	28:24	Zamet	Buzet
19:00 CEST		Report		Stadium: SD Buzet; Attendance: 100; Referee: Robert Kober & Igor Sunajko

20 March 2010 22	Zamet	29:24	Varteks Di Caprio	Rijeka
18:00 CEST		Report		Stadium: Centar Zamet; Attendance: 300; Referee: Ivica Glavinić & Mile Veraja

27 March 2010 23	MKA IPC Čakovec	39:31	Zamet	Čakovec
18:00 CEST		Report		Stadium: Dvorana građevinske škole Attendance: 200; Referee: Josip Cepanec & Ranko Jeftić

7 April 2010 24	Zamet	24:27	Dubrava Zagreb	Rijeka
20:00 CEST		Report		Stadium: Centar Zamet; Attendance: 300; Referee: Matija Gubica & Boris Milošević

11 April 2010 25	EMC Split	27:25	Zamet	Split
18:00 CEST		Report		Stadium: SC Gripe; Attendance: 300; Referee: Ivica Glavinić & Mile Veraja

24 April 2010 26	Zamet	37:31	Bjelovar	Rijeka
18:00 CEST		Report		Stadium: Centar Zamet; Attendance: 400; Referee: Ivan Klapež & Ivan Pervan

30 April 2010 27	Medveščak NFD	33:30	Zamet	Zagreb
18:30 CEST		Report		Stadium: Dom Sportova; Attendance: 120; Referee: Tomislav Cindrić & Robert Gonzurek

6 May 2010 28	Zamet	33:26	Metković	Rijeka
18:00 CEST		Report		Stadium: Centar Zamet; Attendance: 250; Referee: Igor Barle & Saša Vučić

15 May 2010 29	Poreč	29:27	Zamet	Poreč
20:00 CEST		Report		Stadium: SRC Veli Jože; Attendance: 450; Referee: Igor Barle & Saša Vučić

26 May 2010 30	Zamet	31:34	Siscia	Rijeka
20:15 CEST		Report		Stadium: Dvorana Mladosti; Attendance: 200; Referee: Igor Barle & Saša Vučić

== Croatian Cup ==
=== West Region Cup – Qualifiers ===
1 December 2010 Final	Zamet	34:31	Crikvenica	Rijeka
18:00 CEST (UTC+02:00)		Report		Stadium: Centar Zamet; Attendance: 250

=== Matches ===
8 February 2010 Round of 16	Zamet	25:43	Croatia Osiguranje Zagreb	Rijeka
17:30 CEST (UTC+02:00)		Report		Stadium: Centar Zamet; Attendance: 1,500

== Friendlies ==
1 September 2009 Friendly	Bosna BH Gas (Bosnia and Herzegovina)	26:23	(Croatia) Zamet	Poreč
18:30 CEST		Report		Stadium: SRC Veli Jože; Attendance: 150

3 September 2009 Friendly	Poreč	34:33	Zamet	Poreč
17:00 CEST		Report		Stadium: SRC Veli Jože; Attendance: 100

5 September 2009 Friendly	Zamet	26:27	Poreč	Rijeka
17:00 CEST		Report		Stadium: Dvorana Mladosti; Attendance: 120

18 January 2010 Friendly	Zamet	26:27	Karlovac	Rijeka
17:30 CEST		Report		Stadium: Centar Zamet; Attendance: 150

21 January 2010 Friendly	Karlovac	32:28	Zamet	Karlovac
17:30 CEST		Report		Stadium: Dvorana Mladost; Attendance: 300

24 January 2010 Friendly	Zamet	31:35	Siscia	Crikvenica
17:30 CEST		Report		Stadium: GSD Crikvenica; Attendance: 45; Referee: Knez & Trtanj

30 January 2011 Friendly	Zamet (Croatia)	30:34	Qatar	Rijeka
17:30 CEST		Report		Stadium: Centar Zamet; Attendance: 500

== Transfers ==
=== In ===
Date	Position	Player	From	To
1 August 2009	LW	(Croatia) Mateo Hrvatin	Croatia Osiguranje Zagreb	Zamet
15 August 2009	GK	(Croatia) Valter Matošević	(Denmark) FCK Håndbold	Zamet
15 August 2009	GK	(Croatia) Robert Savković	(Spain) SD Teucro	Zamet
August 2009	CB	(Croatia) Krešimir Ivanković	(Romania) HCM Constanța	Zamet

=== Out ===
Date	Position	Player	From	To
July 2009		(Croatia) Andrej Sekulić	(Croatia) Zamet	(Croatia) Crikvenica
July 2009		(Croatia) Davor Vukelić	(Croatia) Zamet	(Croatia) Buzet
July 2009		(Croatia) Marko Erstić	(Croatia) Zamet	(Croatia) Crikvenica
July 2009	CB	(Croatia) Ivan Ćosić	(Croatia) Zamet	(Norway) Bodø HK
Aug 2009	LP	(Croatia) Mirjan Horvat	(Croatia) Zamet	(Croatia) Crikvenica
3 January 2010		(Croatia) Marko Vidović	(Croatia) RK Zadar	Zamet
3 January 2010	GK	(Croatia) Damir Bobanović	(Croatia) RK Crikvenica	Zamet
1 June 2010	CB	(Croatia) Krešimir Ivanković	(Spain) Zamet	Cuenca

== Sources ==
- HRS
- Sport.net.hr
