= 2012–13 RK Zamet season =

Zamet Rijeka
2012–13 season
- President: Zlatko Kolić
- Coach: Alen Kurbanović (1 July 2010 – 28 September 2012); Igor Dokmanović (interim) (2 October 2012 – 9 October 2012); Irfan Smajlagić (9 October 2012 – 30 May 2013)
- Venue: Centar Zamet
- Dukat Premier League: 7th
- Croatian Cup: Quarter-final
- EHF Cup: QR 1
- Top goalscorer: Marin Kružić (142)
- Highest home attendance: 1,000 vs (Czech Republic) Meso Lovosice (15 Sep 2012 - Centar Zamet)
- Lowest home attendance: 50 vs (Slovenia) Riko Ribnica (26 Jan 2013 - Dvorana Mladosti)
- Average home league attendance: 500
Home colours	Away colours

The 2012–13 season was the 56th season in RK Zamet’s history. It is their 5th successive season in the Dukat Premier League, and 35th successive top tier season.

== First team squad ==
Goalkeeper

- 1 (Croatia) Marin Đurica
- 1 (Croatia) Igor Saršon
- 12 (Croatia) Dino Slavić
- 16 (Croatia) Matko Vukić

Wingers
RW

- 6 (Croatia) Dario Černeka
- 15 (Croatia) Igor Montanari - Knez
- 17 (Croatia) Davor Vukelić

LW

- 2 (Croatia) Damir Vučko
- 4 (Croatia) Mateo Hrvatin
- 15 (Croatia) Ivan Vučetić

Line players

- 3 (Croatia) Tomislav Karaula
- 7 (Croatia) Milan Uzelac (captain)
- 10 (Croatia) Marko Kačanić
- 20 (Switzerland) Patrick Čuturić

Back players
LB

- 8 (Croatia) Bojan Lončarić
- 14 (Croatia) Andrej Kalač
- 15 (Croatia) Davor Šunjić

CB

- 5 (Croatia) Luka Mrakovčić
- 9 (Croatia) Ivan Ćosić
- 18 (Croatia) Matija Golik
- 19 (Croatia) Marin Sakić

RB

- 11 (Croatia) Marin Kružić
- 13 (Croatia) Luka Kovačević

=== Technical staff ===
- (Croatia) President: Zlatko Kolić
- (Croatia) Sports director: Aleksandar Čupić
- (Croatia) Sports director: Alvaro Načinović (from 11 October)
- (Croatia) Head Coach: Irfan Smajlagić
- (Croatia) Assistant Coach: Marin Mišković
- (Croatia) Goalkeeper Coach: Valter Matošević (from 11 October)
- (Croatia) Fitness Coach: Branimir Maričević
- (Croatia) Tehniko: Williams Černeka

== Competitions ==
=== Overall ===
Competition	First match	Last match	Starting round	Final position	Record							
Competition	First match	Last match	Starting round	Final position	G	W	D	L	GF	GA	GD	Win %
Dukat Premier League - Regular season	12 September 2012	13 April 2013	Matchday 1	5th	26	16	1	9	756	670	+86	61.54
Dukat Premier League - Play-offs	20 April 2013	2 June 2013	Matchday 1	7th	12	7	0	5	345	329	+16	58.33
Croatian Cup	5 December 2012	27 February 2013	Qualifying round	Quarter-final	2	1	0	1	53	43	+10	50.00
EHF Cup	8 September 2012	15 November 2012	QR1	QR1	2	1	0	1	56	59	−3	50.00
Total					42	25	1	16	1,210	1,101	+109	59.52

== Dukat Premier League ==
=== League table ===
Pos.	Team	Pld.	W	D	L	Goal+	Goal-	Pts.	Qualification or relegation
1.	Siscia	26	22	1	3	853	703	44	Championship play-offs
2.	Dubrava	26	18	1	7	817	766	37	Championship play-offs
3.	Karlovačka Banka	26	18	0	8	802	693	36	Championship play-offs
4.	Poreč	26	16	2	8	793	685	34	Championship play-offs
5.	Zamet	26	16	1	9	756	670	32	Mid-table play-offs
6.	Vidovec Bios	26	15	2	9	781	725	32	Mid-table play-offs
7.	Bjelovar	26	14	2	10	779	714	30	Mid-table play-offs
8.	Buzet	26	12	2	12	756	733	26	Mid-table play-offs
9.	Marina Kaštela	26	10	3	13	731	737	23	Relegation play-offs
10.	Medveščak NFD	26	9	2	15	733	782	20	Relegation play-offs
11.	Gorica	26	9	0	17	760	772	18	Relegation play-offs
12.	Spačva Vinkovci	26	8	1	17	719	790	16	Relegation play-offs
13.	Koteks Split	26	6	0	20	731	852	11	Relegation play-offs
14.	Varteks Di Caprio	26	0	1	25	551	940	0	Relegation play-offs

=== Matches ===
12 September 2012 1	Dubrava	24:23	Zamet	Zagreb
19:30 CEST		Report		Stadium: ŠD Dubrava; Attendance: 400; Referee: Matija Gubica i Boris Milošević (Osijek)

19 September 2012 2	Zamet	29:35	Siscia	Rijeka
18:99 CEST		Report		Stadium: Centar Zamet; Attendance: 100; Referee: Dalibor Jurinović (Zadar) & Marko Mrvica (Biograd na moru)

22 September 2012 3	Spačva	30:28	Zamet	Vinkovci
19:00 CEST		Report		Stadium: ŠSD Bartol Kašic; Attendance: 100; Referee: Igor Barle & Saša Vučić (Zagreb)

27 September 2012 4	Zamet	35:40	Bjelovar	Rijeka
18:00 CEST		Report		Stadium: Centar Zamet; Attendance: 100; Referee: Gladović & Volenik (Virovitica)

7 October 2012 5	Gorica	31:34	Zamet	Velika Gorica
17:00 CEST		Report		Stadium: SD Gorica; Attendance: 150; Referee: Dalibor Jurinović (Zadar) & Marko Mrvica (Biograd na moru)

13 October 2012 6	Zamet	37:20	Varadžin	Rijeka
18:00 CEST		Report		Stadium: Centar Zamet; Attendance: 300; Referee: Vanja Banović & Vedran Banović (Požega)

21 October 2012 7	Medveščak NFD	24:26	Zamet	Zagreb
18:30 CEST		Report		Stadium: SD Šutinska Vrela; Attendance: 300; Referee: Tomislav Crnčić & Robert Gonzurek(Osijek)

27 October 2012 8	Zamet	24:26	Buzet	Rijeka
18:00 CEST		Report		Stadium: Centar Zamet; Attendance: 500; Referee: Igor Barle & Saša Vučić (Zagreb)

3 November 2012 9	Koteks Split	29:30	Zamet	Split
17:00 CEST		Report		Stadium: SC Gripe; Attendance: 100; Referee: Kober (Zagreb) & Sunajko (Dugo Selo)

10 November 2012 10	Zamet	28:22	Marina Kaštela	Rijeka
18:00 CEST		Report		Stadium: Centar Zamet; Attendance: 400; Referee: Siniša Bosak & Željko Herceg (Varaždin)

17 November 2012 11	Karlovačka Banka	28:26	Zamet	Karlovac
18:00 CEST		Report		Stadium: Dvorana Mladost; Attendance: 200; Referee: Igor Barle & Saša Vučić (Zagreb)

24 November 2012 12	Zamet	26:26	Poreč	Rijeka
17:00 CEST		Report		Stadium: Centar Zamet; Attendance: 450; Referee: Matija Gubica (Petrinjevci) & Boris Milošević (Osijek)

1 December 2012 13	Vidovec Bios	24:28	Zamet	Vidovec
19:00 CEST		Report		Stadium: ŠSD Vidovec; Attendance: 200; Referee: Vanja Banović & Vedran Banović (Požega)

9 December 2012 14	Zamet	32:27	Dubrava	Rijeka
17:00 CEST		Report		Stadium: Centar Zamet; Attendance: 400; Referee: Ivica Glavinić & Mile Veraja (Metković)

15 December 2012 15	Siscia	31:26	Zamet	Sisak
18:00 CEST		Report		Stadium: ŠD Brezovica; Attendance: 200; Referee: Matija Gubica (Petrinjevci) & Boris Milošević (Osijek)

2 February 2013 16	Zamet	22:21	Spačva	Rijeka
18:00 CEST		Report		Stadium: Centar Zamet; Attendance: 250; Referee: Marko Lovrić (Zagreb) & Siniša Tanasić (Dugo Selo)

9 February 2013 17	Bjelovar	28:22	Zamet	Bjelovar
19:00 CEST		Report		Stadium: ŠSD Bjelovar; Attendance: 300; Referee: Matija Gubica (Petrinjevci) & Boris Milošević (Osijek)

16 February 2013 18	Zamet	28:25	Gorica	Rijeka
18:00 CEST		Report		Stadium: Centar Zamet; Attendance: 200; Referee: Ivan Klapež & Ivan Pervan (Trilja)

23 February 2013 19	Varteks Di Caprio	11:41	Zamet	Varaždin
19:00 CEST		Report		Stadium: GD Varaždin; Attendance: 200; Referee: Igor Barle & Saša Vučić (Zagreb)

2 March 2013 20	Zamet	36:27	Medveščak NFD	Rijeka
18:00 CEST		Report		Stadium: Centar Zamet; Attendance: 300; Referee: Josip Cepanec (Turčin) & Ranko Jeftić (Varaždin)

6 March 2013 21	Buzet	23:24	Zamet	Buzet
19:00 CEST		Report		Stadium: SD Buzet; Attendance: 300; Referee: Matija Gubica (Petrinjevci) & Boris Milošević (Osijek)

9 March 2013 22	Zamet	27:14	Split Koteks	Rijeka
18:00 CEST		Report		Stadium: Centar Zamet; Attendance: 500; Referee: Vanja Banović & Vedran Banović (Požega)

17 March 2013 23	Marina Kaštela	19:22	Zamet	Kaštel Stari
18:00 CEST		Report		Stadium: GD Kaštela; Attendance: 250; Referee: Robert Kober (Zagreb) & Igor Sunajko (Dugo Selo)

23 March 2013 24	Zamet	29:31	Karlovačka Banka	Rijeka
18:00 CEST		Report		Stadium: Centar Zamet; Attendance: 700; Referee: Igor Barle & Saša Vučić (Zagreb)

10 April 2013 25	Poreč	24:22	Zamet	Poreč
19:00 CEST		Report		Stadium: S.R.C. Veli Jože; Attendance: 700; Referee: Matija Gubica (Petrinjevci) & Boris Milošević (Osijek)

13 April 2013 26	Zamet	28:24	Vidovec Bios	Rijeka
18:00 CEST		Report		Stadium: Centar Zamet; Attendance: 100; Referee: Dalibor Jurinović & Marko Mrica (Zadar)

=== Play-offs table ===
Pos.	Team	Pld.	W	D	L	Goal+	Goal-	Pts.	Place
1.	Zamet	12	7	0	5	345	329	14	7th
2.	Bjelovar	12	6	2	4	362	357	14	8th
3.	Buzet	12	4	2	6	343	349	10	9th
4.	Vidovec Bios	12	4	2	6	339	354	10	10th

=== Matches ===
20 April 2013 1	Buzet	27:25	Zamet	Buzet
19:30 CEST		Report		Stadium: SD Buzet; Attendance: 300; Referee: Siniša Bosak & Željko Herceg (Varaždin)

27 April 2013 2	Zamet	30:25	Vidovec Bios	Rijeka
18:00 CEST		Report		Stadium: Centar Zamet; Attendance: 100; Referee: Dražen Gladovići & Goran Volenik (Virovitica)

4 May 2013 3	Bjelovar	26:25	Zamet	Bjelovar
19:00 CEST		Report		Stadium: ŠSD Bjelovar; Attendance: 100; Referee: Marko Lovrić (Zagreb) & Siniša Tanasić (Dugo Selo)

18 May 2013 4	Zamet	33:28	Buzet	Rijeka
18:00 CEST		Report		Stadium: Centar Zamet; Attendance: 150; Referee: Josip Capanec (Turčin) & Ranko Jeftć (Varaždin)

25 May 2013 5	Vidovec Bios	29:24	Zamet	Vidovec
19:00 CEST		Report		Stadium: Centar Zamet; Attendance: 100; Referee: Igor Barle & Saša Vučić (Zagreb)

2 June 2013 6	Zamet	34:23	Bjelovar	Rijeka
19:00 CEST		Report		Stadium: Centar Zamet; Attendance: 250; Referee: Josip Capanec (Turčin) & Ranko Jeftć (Varaždin)

=== PGŽ Cup - Qualifier matches ===
5 December 2012 Final	Crikvenica	16:27	Zamet	Crikvenica
18:00 CEST		Report		Stadium: GSD Crikvenica; Attendance: 350

=== Matches ===
27 February 2013 Quarter-finals	Zamet	26:27	Poreč	Rijeka
18:00 CEST (UTC+02:00)		Report		Stadium: Centar Zamet; Attendance: 400; Referee: Dalibor Jurinković (Zadar) & Marko Mrvica (Biograd na moru)

=== EHF Cup ===
8 September 2012 QR1	Meso Lovosice (Czech Republic)	27:23	(Croatia) Zamet Rijeka	Lovosice, Czech Republic
17:00 CEST (UTC+02:00)		Report		Stadium: Sport Hall CHEMIK; Attendance: 800; Referee: Said Bounouara & Khalid Sami (France)

15 September 2012 QR1	Zamet Rijeka (Croatia)	33:32 (56:59 agg.)	(Czech Republic) Meso Lovosice	Rijeka, Croatia
20:30 CEST (UTC+02:00)		Report		Stadium: Centar Zamet; Attendance: 1,000; Referee: Kursad Erdogan & Ibrahim Ozdeniz (Turkey)

=== Friendlies ===
28 August 2013 Friendly	Zamet	34:20	Moslavina	Daruvar
17:00 CEST		Report		Stadium: Daruvarske toplice Attendance: 50; Referee: ?

21 August 2012 Friendly	Zamet (Croatia)	32:32	(Slovenia) Riko Ribnica	Rijeka
17:00 CEST		Report		Stadium: Centar Zamet; Attendance: 70; Referee: Nikša Kalčić & Lovro Tomović (Rijeka)

23 August 2012 Friendly	Buzet	27:26	Zamet	Buzet
18:00 CEST		Report		Stadium: Dvorana buzet Attendance: 100; Referee: ?

25 August 2012 Friendly	Zamet	25:29	Poreč	Rijeka
17:00 CEST		Report		Stadium: Centar Zamet; Attendance: 100; Referee: Luka Matejčić & Lovro Tomović (Rijeka)

28 August 2012 Friendly	Zamet	31:30	Umag	Rijeka
19:00 CEST		Report		Stadium: Centar Zamet; Attendance: 100; Referee: Irena Pahor i Sanja Trbović (Rijeka)

21 August 2012 Friendly	Zamet (Croatia)	34:34	(Slovenia) Izola	Rijeka
17:30 CEST		Report		Stadium: Centar Zamet; Attendance: 50; Referee: Pravdan Pešutić (Matulji) & Igor Prpić (Ika)

19 January 2013 Friendly	Poreč	25:28	Zamet	Poreč
16:30 CEST		Report		Stadium: Dvorana Hotela Valamar Dijamant; Attendance: 50; Referee: Kamba & Tišljarec (Umag)

26 January 2013 Friendly	Zamet (Croatia)	36:30	(Slovenia) Riko Ribnica	Rijeka
18:00 CEST		Report		Stadium: Dvorana Mladosti; Attendance: 50; Referee: Robert Bernobić & Nikša Kalčić (Rijeka)

== Transfers ==
=== In ===
Date	Position	Player	From	To
10 June 2012	RW	(Croatia) Davor Vukelić	(Croatia) Buzet	Zamet
15 June 2012	LB	(Croatia) Davor Šunjić	(Croatia) Kozala	Zamet
23 July 2012	GK	(Croatia) Igor Saršon	(Croatia) Senj	Zamet
