= 2011–12 RK Zamet season =

Zamet Rijeka
2011–12 season
- President: Zlatko Kolić
- Coach: Alen Kurbanović
- Venue: Centar Zamet
- Dukat Premier League: 7th
- Croatian Cup: Final
- Top goalscorer: Mateo Hrvatin (140)
- Highest home attendance: 800 vs RK Buzet (3 Dec 2011 - Centar Zamet)
- Lowest home attendance: 100 vs RK Bjelovar (19 May 2012 - Centar Zamet)
Home colours	Away colours

The 2011–12 season was the 55th season in RK Zamet’s history. It is their 4th successive season in the Dukat Premier League, and 34th successive top tier season.

== First team squad ==
Goalkeeper

- 1 (Croatia) Marin Đurica
- 12 (Croatia) Ivan Stevanović
- 16 (Croatia) Dino Slavić

Wingers
RW

- 6 (Croatia) Dario Černeka
- 15 (Croatia) Igor Montanari - Knez

LW

- 2 (Croatia) Damir Vučko
- 4 (Croatia) Mateo Hrvatin

Line players

- 3 (Croatia) Tomislav Karaula
- 7 (Croatia) Milan Uzelac (captain)
- 10 (Croatia) Teo Čorić
- 10 (Croatia) Marko Kačanić
- 20 (Switzerland) Patrick Čuturić

Back players
LB

- 8 (Croatia) Bojan Lončarić
- 14 (Croatia) Ivan Lukačić
- 17 (Slovenia) Igor Vujić

CB

- 5 (Croatia) Luka Mrakovčić
- 9 (Croatia) Ivan Ćosić
- 18 (Croatia) Matija Golik
- 19 (Croatia) Marin Sakić

RB

- 11 (Croatia) Marin Kružić
- 13 (Croatia) Luka Kovačević

Source: rukometstat.com Source: SportCom.hr

=== Technical staff ===
- (Croatia) President: Zlatko Kolić
- (Croatia) Vice-president: Željko Jovanović (until March 3)
- (Croatia) Sports director: Aleksandar Čupić
- (Croatia) Head Coach: Alen Kurbanović
- (Croatia) Assistant Coach: Marin Mišković
- (Croatia) Goalkeeper Coach: Igor Dokmanović
- (Croatia) Fitness Coach: Branimir Maričević
- (Croatia) Tehniko: Williams Černeka

== Competitions ==
=== Overall ===
Competition	First match	Last match	Starting round	Final position	Record							
Competition	First match	Last match	Starting round	Final position	G	W	D	L	GF	GA	GD	Win %
Dukat Premier League - Regular season	17 September 2011	17 March 2012	Matchday 1	7th	24	12	3	9	723	654	+69	50.00
Dukat Premier League - Play-offs	14 April 2012	26 May 2012	Matchday 1	7th	6	4	0	2	198	181	+17	66.67
Croatian Cup	9 February 2012	6 May 2012	Round of 16	Final	5	4	0	1	157	146	+11	80.00
Total					35	20	3	12	1,078	981	+97	57.14

== Dukat Premier League ==
=== League table ===
Pos.	Team	Pld.	W	D	L	Goal+	Goal-	Pts.	Qualification or relegation
1.	Siscia Sisak	24	16	4	4	737	651	36	Championship play-offs
2.	Poreč	24	16	3	5	699	634	35	Championship play-offs
3.	Karlovačka Banka	24	14	4	6	685	637	32	Championship play-offs
4.	Split	24	12	5	7	664	613	29	Championship play-offs
5.	Buzet	24	13	2	9	651	614	28	Europe qualification play-offs
6.	Spačva Vinokovci	24	13	2	9	721	725	28	Europe qualification play-offs
7.	Zamet	24	12	3	9	723	654	27	Europe qualification play-offs
8.	Bjelovar	24	12	2	10	655	615	26	Europe qualification play-offs
9.	Dubrava	24	11	2	11	679	675	24	Relegation play-offs
10.	Marina Kaštela	24	10	3	11	735	705	23	Relegation play-offs
11.	Gorica	24	6	2	16	686	760	14	Relegation play-offs
12.	Varteks Di Caprio	24	4	1	19	692	803	9	Relegation play-offs
13.	Međimurje Čakovec	24	0	1	23	630	871	1	Relegation play-offs
14.	Arena Jadrograd Pula	Quit after their 8th match, all results erased							Relegation play-offs

Source: rukometstat.com Source: SportCom.hr

=== Matches ===
17 September 2011 1	Zamet	23:20	Dubrava	Rijeka
18:00 CEST		Report		Stadium: Centar Zamet; Attendance: 600; Referee: Dalibor Jurinović & Marko Mrvica (Zadar)

24 September 2011 2	Zamet	36:24	Marina Kaštela	Rijeka
17:30 CEST		Report		Stadium: Centar Zamet; Attendance: 350; Referee: Petar Bulum & Nikola Carević (Metković)

22 September 2012 3	Zamet	31:19	Poreč	Rijeka
18:00 CEST		Report		Stadium: Centar Zamet; Attendance: 100; Referee: Tomislav Cindrić & Robert Gonzurek (Osijek)

8 October 2011 4	Međimurje Čakovec	24:30	Zamet	Čakovec
19:00 CEST		http://www.rukometstat.com/rukometstat/utakmicepdf/opsirna928.pdf Report]		Stadium: Dvorana GOC; Attendance: 150; Referee: Vanja Banović & Vedran Banović (Požega)

15 October 2011 5	Zamet	18:24	Karlovačka Banka	Rijeka
18:00 CEST		Report		Stadium: Centar Zamet; Attendance: 200; Referee: Matija Gubica & Boris Milošević (Osijek)

22 October 2011 6	Siscia	26:21	Zamet	Sisak
18:00 CEST		Report		Stadium: ŠD Brazovica; Attendance: 300; Referee: Dalibor Jurinovic & Marko Mrvica (Zadar)

29 October 2011 7	Zamet	39:25	Spačva Vinkovci	Rijeka
18:30 CEST		Report		Stadium: Centar Zamet; Attendance: 300; Referee: Dražen Gladović & Goran Volenik (Virovitica)

12 November 2011 8	Split	31:30	Zamet	Split
18:00 CEST		Report		Stadium: Š.C. Gripe; Attendance: 200; Referee: Tomislav CindriĆ & Robert Gonzurek (Osijek)

19 November 2011 9	Zamet	37:26	Varteks Di Caprio	Rijeka
18:00 CEST		Report		Stadium: Centar Zamet; Attendance: 200; Referee: Igor Barle & Saša Vucić (Zagreb)

26 November 2011 10	Gorica	30:40	Zamet	Velika Gorica
18:00 CEST		Report		Stadium: Dvorana Srednjih strukovnih škola Attendance: 150; Referee: Dalibor Jurinovic & Marko Mrvica (Zadar)

3 December 2011 11	Zamet	21:27	Buzet	Rijeka
18:00 CEST		Report		Stadium: Centar Zamet; Attendance: 800; Referee: Josip Cepanec (Turčin) & Ranko Jeftc (Varaždin)

13 December 2011 12	Dubrava	23:23	Zamet	Zagreb
17:30 CEST		Report		Stadium: ŠD Dubrava; Attendance: 200; Referee: Ivan Klapež & Ivan Pervan (Trilj)

15 February 2012 13	Poreč	31:25	Zamet	Vidovec
19:30 CEST		Report		Stadium: SRC Veli Jože; Attendance: 200; Referee: Igor Barle & Saša Vucić (Zagreb)

17 February 2012 14	Zamet	41:33	Međimurje Čakovec	Rijeka
18:00 CEST		Report		Stadium: Centar Zamet; Attendance: 50; Referee: Ivica Glavinić & Mile Veraja (Metković)

19 February 2012 15	Marina Kaštela	32:24	Zamet	Kaštel Stari
18:00 CEST		Report		Stadium: Gradska dvorana KAŠTELA; Attendance: 125; Referee: Ivica Glavinić & Mile Veraja (Metković)

26 February 2012 16	Karlovačka Banka	25:24	Zamet	Karlovac
18:00 CEST		Report		Stadium: Dvorana Mladost; Attendance: 800; Referee: Robert Kober (Zagreb) & Igor Sunajko (Dugo Selo)

29 February 2012 17	Zamet	27:27	Siscia Sisak	Rijeka
18:00 CEST		Report		Stadium: Centar Zamet; Attendance: 300; Referee: Matija Gubica (Petrinjevci) & Boris Milošević (Osijek)

3 March 2012 18	Spačva Vinkovci	35:31	Zamet	Vinkovci
18:30 CEST		Report		Stadium: OŠ Bartola Kašić; Attendance: 200; Referee: Matija Gubica & Boris Milošević (Osijek)

7 March 2012 19	Zamet	39:22	Split	Rijeka
18:00 CEST		Report		Stadium: Centar Zamet; Attendance: 150; Referee: Matija Gubica & Boris Milošević (Osijek)

10 March 2012 20	Varteks Di Caprio	30:38	Zamet	Varaždin
18:00 CEST		Report		Stadium: GD Varaždin; Attendance: 300; Referee: Ante Pavić & Mate Torbarina (Zadar)

14 March 2012 21	Zamet	37:33	Gorica	Rijeka
18:00 CEST		Report		Stadium: Centar Zamet; Attendance: 250; Referee: Robert Kober (Zagreb) & Igor Sunajko (Dugo Selo)

17 March 2012 22	Buzet	26:25	Zamet	Buzet
18:00 CEST		Report		Stadium: SD Buzet; Attendance: 400; Referee: Dalibor Jurinović (Zadar) & Marko Mrvica (Biograd na Moru)

Source: rukometstat.com Source: SportCom.hr

== Europe play-offs ==
=== Table ===
Pos.	Team	Pld.	W	D	L	Goal+	Goal-	Pts.	Place
1.	Zamet	6	4	0	2	198	181	13	7th
2.	Bjelovar	6	4	0	2	175	171	13	8th
3.	Buzet	6	2	0	4	144	167	12	9th
4.	Spačva Vinkovci	6	2	0	4	180	178	10	10th

=== Matches ===
14 April 2012 1	Buzet	26:25	Zamet	Buzet
18:30 CEST		Report		Stadium: SD Buzet; Attendance: 450; Referee: Vanja Banović & Vedran Banović (Požega)

2 April 2012 2	Bjelovar	32:27	Zamet	Bjelovar
19:00 CEST		Report		Stadium: ŠSD Bjelovar; Attendance: 200; Referee: Vanja Banović & Vedran Banović (Požega)

28 April 2012 3	Zamet	39:35	Spačva Vinkovci	Rijeka
18:00 CEST		Report		Stadium: Centar Zamet; Attendance: 200; Referee: Ivan Klapez & Ivan Pervan (Trilj)

12 May 2012 4	Zamet	34:24	Buzet	Rijeka
18:00 CEST		Report		Stadium: Centar Zamet; Attendance: 200; Referee: Josip Cepanec (Turčin) & Ranko Jeftić (Varaždin)

19 May 2012 5	Zamet	38:32	Bjelovar	Rijeka
20:00 CEST		Report		Stadium: Centar Zamet; Attendance: 100; Referee: Dalibor Jurinović & Marko Mrvica (Zadar)

26 May 2012 6	Spačva Vinkovci	32:35	Zamet	Vinkovci
18:00 CEST		Report		Stadium: ŠSD Bartol Kašic; Attendance: 120; Referee: Igor Brale (Zagreb) & Saša Vucić (Dugo Selo)

Source: rukometstat.com Source: SportCom.hr

== Croatian Cup ==
=== PGŽ Cup - Qualifiers ===
20 December 2011 Final	Zamet	30:25	Kozala	Rijeka
18:00 CEST (UTC+02:00)		Report		Stadium: Centar Zamet; Attendance: 150; Referee: Igor Barle & Saša Vučić (Zagreb)

Source: rukometstat.com Source: SportCom.hr

=== Matches ===
9 February 2016 Round of 16	Vidovec Bios	29:37	Zamet	Vidovec
18:00 CEST (UTC+02:00)		Report		Stadium: OŠ Vidovec; Attendance: 500; Referee: Igor Barle & Saša Vučić (Zagreb)

11 April 2016 Quarter-final	Zamet	32:28	Bjelovar	Rijeka
19:30 CEST (UTC+02:00)		Report		Stadium: Centar Zamet; Attendance: 150; Referee: Dalibor Jurinović (Zadar) & Marko Mrvica (Biograd na Moru)

5 May 2016 Semi-final	NEXE Našice	28:35	Zamet	Poreč
17:00 CEST (UTC+02:00)		Report		Stadium: SD Žatika; Attendance: 1,500; Referee: Dalibor Jurinovic & Marko Mrvica (Zadar)

6 May 2016 Final	Zamet	23:36	Croatia Osiguranje Zagreb	Poreč
17:30 CEST (UTC+02:00)		Report		Stadium: SD Žatika; Attendance: 1,500; Referee: Matija Gubica & Boris Milošević (Osijek)

Source: rukometstat.com Source: SportCom.hr

== Friendlies ==
21 January 2012 Friendly	Zamet	27:32	Buzet	Rijeka
17:30 CEST		Report		Stadium: Centar Zamet; Attendance: 100; Referee: ?

22 January 2012 Friendly	Zamet	30:24	Senj Walenborn	Rijeka
17:30 CEST		Report		Stadium: Centar Zamet; Attendance: 150; Referee: ?

26 January 2012 Friendly	Zamet	27:26	Matulji	Rijeka
18:00 CEST		Report		Stadium: Centar Zamet; Attendance: 120; Referee: ?

Source: SportCom.hr

== Transfers ==
=== In ===
Date	Position	Player	From	To
11 January 2012	LP	(Croatia) Marko Kačanić	(Croatia) Kozala	Zamet
14 January 2012	LB	(Slovenia) Igor Vujić	(Slovenia) Maribor	Zamet

=== Out ===
Date	Position	Player	From	To
3 Feb 2012	RW	(Croatia) Igor Montanari	(Croatia) Zamet	(Qatar) Al Ahly
26 May 2012	GK	(Croatia) Ivan Stevanović	(Croatia) Zamet	Croatia Osiguranje Zagreb
4 June 2012	GK	(Slovenia) Igor Vujić	(Croatia) Zamet	(Croatia) NEXE Našice
