= 2017–18 RK Zamet season =

Zamet Rijeka
2017–18 season
- President: Vedran Devčić
- Coach: Igor Marijanović (until 28 January 2018); Drago Žiljak (from 29 January 2018)
- Venue: Centar Zamet
- Dukat Premier League: 7th
- Croatian Cup: Round of 16
- Top goalscorer: League: Matija Golik - 135 goals All: Matija Golik - 148 goals
- Highest home attendance: 500 v Metalac Zagreb (25 February 2018 - Dvorana Mladosti)
- Lowest home attendance: 100 v Mornar Crikvenica (13 December 2017 - Centar Zamet)
- Average home league attendance: 200
Home colours	Away colours

The 2017–18 season was the 61st season in RK Zamet’s history. It is their 10th successive season in the Dukat Premier League, and 40th successive top tier season.

== Team ==
=== Current squad ===
Goalkeeper

- 12 (Croatia) Fran Lučin
- 16 (Croatia) Marin Sorić
- 26 (China) Wang Quan

Wingers
RW

- 5 (Croatia) Martin Mozetić
- 6 (Croatia) Jakov Mozetić

LW

- 2 (Croatia) Damir Vučko
- 3 (Croatia) Dario Jeličić
- 20 (Croatia) Dujam Dunato

Line players

- 13 (Croatia) Veron Načinović
- 19 (Croatia) Ivan Majić

Back players
LB

- 7 (Croatia) Luka Grgurević
- 24 (China) Zhao Chen

CB

- 8 (Croatia) Patrik Martinović
- 9 (Croatia) Nikola Njegovan
- 17 (Croatia) Antun Dunato
- 22 (Croatia) Marko Mrakovčić
- 23 (Croatia) Matija Golik (captain)

RB

- 11 (Croatia) Marin Kružić
- 15 (Croatia) Matija Starčević

== Technical staff ==
- (Croatia) President: Vedran Devčić
- (Croatia) Sports director: Vedran Babić
- (Croatia) Head Coach: Drago Žiljak
- (Croatia) Assistant Coach: Marin Mišković
- (Croatia) Goalkeeper Coach: Valter Matošević
- (Croatia) Fitness Coach: Emil Baltić
- (Croatia) Fizioterapist: Dragan Marijanović
- (Croatia) Team Manager: Boris Konjuh

== Competitions ==
=== Overall ===
Competition	First match	Last match	Starting round	Final position	Record							
Competition	First match	Last match	Starting round	Final position	G	W	D	L	GF	GA	GD	Win %
Dukat Premier League - Regular season	23 September 2017	17 March 2018	Matchday 1	5th	18	9	0	9	471	478	−7	50.00
Dukat Premier League - Play-offs	24 March 2018	2 June 2018	Matchday 1	1st	10	6	2	2	312	280	+32	60.00
Croatian Cup	13 December 2017	7 February 2018	Qualifying Round	Round of 16	2	1	0	1	51	56	−5	50.00
Total					28	14	2	12	834	814	+20	50.00

Last updated: 2 June 2018

== Dukat Premier League ==
=== League table ===
Pos.	Team	Pld.	W	D	L	Goal+	Goal-	+/-	Pts.	Qualification or relegation
1.	Dubrava Zagreb	18	13	1	4	562	525	+37	27	Championship play-offs
2.	Varaždin 1930	18	11	1	6	519	478	+41	23	Championship play-offs
3.	Poreč	18	11	1	6	435	427	+8	23	Championship play-offs
4.	Spačva Vinkovci	18	10	3	5	479	471	+8	23	Championship play-offs
5.	Zamet Rijeka	18	9	0	9	471	478	-7	18	Relegation play-offs
6.	Umag	18	8	0	10	470	463	+7	16	Relegation play-offs
7.	Gorica	18	7	1	10	502	505	-3	15	Relegation play-offs
8.	Sesvete	18	6	2	10	473	502	-29	14	Relegation play-offs
9.	Karlovac	18	6	0	12	484	501	-17	12	Relegation play-offs
10.	Metalac Zagreb	18	4	1	13	470	515	-45	9	Relegation play-offs

Updated to match(es) played on 18 March 2018. Source: Premijer liga Reultati.com

=== Matches ===
23 September 2017 1	Gorica	29:26	Zamet	Velika Gorica
18:00 CEST		Report		Stadium: Dvorana srednjih škola Attendance: 100; Referee: Nikola Knežević & Tomislav Tunuković (Vrpolje)

30 September 2017 2	Varaždin 1930	25:29	Zamet	Varaždin
18:00 CEST		Report		Stadium: Varaždin Arena; Attendance: 200; Referee: Igor Hunjadi & Marijo Zečević (Zagreb)

11 October 2017 3	Zamet	34:40	Dubrava Zagreb	Rijeka
18:00 CEST		Report		Stadium: Centar Zamet; Attendance: 250; Referee: Matija Gubica & Boris Milošević (Osijek)

14 October 2017 4	Poreč	27:18	Zamet	Poreč
18:00 CEST		Report		Stadium: SRC Veli Jože; Attendance: 300; Referee: Dalibor Jurinović (Zadar) & Marko Mrvica (Biograd na Moru)

21 October 2017 5	Zamet	23:27	Sesvete	Rijeka
19:00 CEST		Report		Stadium: Centar Zamet; Attendance: 138; Referee: Igor Hunjadi & Mario Zečević (Zagreb)

4 November 2017 6	Metalac Zagreb	24:29	Zamet	Zagreb
20:00 CEST		Report		Stadium: Kutija Šibica; Attendance: 200; Referee: Dalibor Jurinović (Zadar) & Marko Mrvica (Biograd na Moru)

11 November 2017 7	Zamet	27:30	Umag	Rijeka
19:00 CEST		Report		Stadium: Centar Zamet; Attendance: 205; Referee: Matija Gubica & Boris Milošević (Osijek)

18 November 2017 8	Spačva Vinkovci	22:17	Zamet	Vinkovci
19:00 CEST		Report		Stadium: SD Bartol Kašić; Attendance: 50; Referee: Igor Marko Duspara & Hrvoje Rogić (Gorica)

24 November 2017 9	Zamet	31:24	Karlovac	Rijeka
19:00 CEST		Report		Stadium: Centar Zamet; Attendance: 250; Referee: Davor Lončar & Zoran Lončar (Varaždin)

2 December 2017 10	Zamet	29:24	Gorica	Rijeka
19:00 CEST		Report		Stadium: Centar Zamet; Attendance: 100; Referee: Matija Gubica & Boris Milošević (Osijek)

9 December 2017 11	Zamet	19:27	Varaždin 1930	Rijeka
18:00 CEST		Report		Stadium: Centar Zamet; Attendance: 200; Referee: Dalibor Jurinović (Zadar) & Marko Mrvica (Biograd na Moru)

16 December 2017 12	Dubrava Zagreb	34:27	Zamet	Zagreb
18:00 CEST		Report		Stadium: ŠD Dubrava; Attendance: 200; Referee: Davor Lončar & Zoran Lončar (Varaždin)

10 February 2018 13	Zamet	31:22	Poreč	Rijeka
19:00 CEST		Report		Stadium: Centar Zamet; Attendance: 182; Referee: Dražen Gladović & Goran Volenik (Virovitica)

17 February 2018 14	Sesvete	28:29	Zamet	Sesvete
17:00 CEST		Report		Stadium: Gradska dvorana Sesvete; Attendance: 150; Referee: Dalibor Jurinović (Zadar) & Marko Mrvica (Biograd na Moru)

24 February 2018 15	Zamet	20:18	Metalac Zagreb	Rijeka
17:00 CEST		Report		Stadium: Dvorana Mladosti; Attendance: 500; Referee: Siniša Bosak & Željko Herceg (Varaždin)

3 March 2018 16	Umag	33:29	Zamet	Umag
18:00 CEST		Report		Stadium: Štella Maris; Attendance: 500; Referee: Igor Barle & Saša Vučić (Zagreb)

10 March 2018 17	Zamet	27:19	Spačva Vinkovci	Rijeka
19:00 CEST		Report		Stadium: Centar Zamet; Attendance: 300; Referee: Tomislav Cindrić & Robert Gonzurek (Osijek)

17 March 2018 18	Karlovac	27:28	Zamet	Karlovac
18:00 CEST		Report		Stadium: ŠŠD Karlovac; Attendance: 800; Referee: Matija Gubica & Boris Milošević (Osijek)

Source: Premijer liga SportCom.hr

=== League table ===
Pos.	Team	Pld.	W	D	L	Goal+	Goal-	+/-	Pts.	Qualification or relegation
1.	Zamet Rijeka	20	12	2	6	581	542	+39	26	Dukat Premier League 2018-19
2.	Umag	20	11	3	6	574	535	+39	25	Dukat Premier League 2018-19
3.	Gorica	20	11	0	9	580	553	+27	22	Dukat Premier League 2018-19
4.	Sesvete	20	10	1	9	544	541	+3	21	Dukat Premier League 2018-19
5.	Karlovac	20	7	2	11	548	578	-30	16	Relegation to Prva HRL 2018-19
6.	Metalac Zagreb	20	4	2	14	540	618	-78	10	Relegation to Prva HRL 2018-19

Updated to match(es) played on 2 June 2018. This table contains statistics combined with the regular part of the Dukat Premier League with matches played by team in the relegation play-offs. Source: SportCom.hr

=== Matches ===
24 March 2018 1	Zamet	34:29	Metalac Zagreb	Rijeka
19:00 CEST		Report		Stadium: Centar Zamet; Attendance: 300; Referee: Matija Gubica & Boris Milošević (Osijek)

4 April 2018 2	Zamet	25:25	Umag	Rijeka
18:00 CEST		Report		Stadium: Centar Zamet; Attendance: 250; Referee: Igor Barle & Saša Vučić (Zagreb)

11 April 2018 3	Gorica	34:27	Zamet	Velika Gorica
18:00 CEST		Report		Stadium: Dvorana srednjih škola Attendance: 100; Referee: Dalibor Marinović (Zadar) & Marko Mrvica (Biograd na moru)

14 April 2018 4	Zamet	31:26	Sesvete	Rijeka
19:00 CEST		Report		Stadium: Centar Zamet; Attendance: 200; Referee: Ivica Glavinić & Mile Veraja (Metković)

21 April 2018 5	Karlovac	30:25	Zamet	Karlovac
18:00 CEST		Report		Stadium: ŠŠD Karlovac; Attendance: 400; Referee: Igor Barle & Saša Vučić (Zagreb)

28 April 2018 6	Metalac Zagreb	24:28	Zamet	Zagreb
18:00 CEST		Report		Stadium: Kutija Šibica; Attendance: 100

5 May 2018 7	Umag	31:31	Zamet	Umag
20:00 CEST		Report		Stadium: Stella Maris; Attendance: 150; Referee: Igor Emanović & Zoran Mikić (Štivica)

19 May 2018 8	Zamet	37:32	Gorica	Rijeka
19:00 CEST		Report		Stadium: Centar Zamet; Attendance: 111; Referee: Siniša Bosak & Željko Herceg (Varaždin)

26 May 2018 9	Sesvete	22:36	Zamet	Sesvete
17:00 CEST		Report		Stadium: Dvorana gimnazije Sesvete; Attendance: 100; Referee: Igor Barle & Saša Vučić (Zagreb)

2 June 2018 10	Zamet	38:27	Karlovac	Rijeka
19:00 CEST		Report		Stadium: Centar Zamet; Attendance: 134; Referee: Siniša Bosak & Željko Herceg (Varaždin)

== Croatian Cup ==
=== PGŽ Cup - Qualifier matches ===
13 December 2017 Final	Zamet	34:27	Mornar Crikvenica	Rijeka
18:00 CEST		Report		Stadium: Centar Zamet; Attendance: 100; Referee: Robert Bernobić & Nikša Kalčić

=== Matches ===
7 February 2018 Round of 16	NEXE Našice	29:17	Zamet	Našice
19:00 CEST		Report		Stadium: SD OŠ Kralj Tomislava; Attendance: 600; Referee: Davor Lončar & Zoran Lončar (Varaždin)

== Friendly matches ==
=== 60th Anniversary matches ===
17 June 2017 Friendly	Zamet Veterans A	10:10	Zamet Veterans B	Rijeka
17:00 CEST		Report		Stadium: Centar Zamet; Attendance: 350; Referee: Darko Tomović & Vladimir Vujnović (Rijeka)

17 June 2017 Friendly	Zamet	31:31	Zamet All-Star	Rijeka
18:00 CEST		Report		Stadium: Centar Zamet; Attendance: 650; Referee: Knežević & Trifunović (Rijeka)

=== Pre-season matches ===
5 September 2017 Friendly	Zamet	27:29	Kozala	Rijeka
18:00 CEST		Report		Stadium: Centar Zamet

8 September 2017 Friendly	Zamet	34:21	Trsat	Rijeka
17:00 CEST		Report		Stadium: Centar Zamet

13 September 2017 Friendly	Kozala	26:32	Zamet	Rijeka
18:00 CEST		Report		Stadium: Dvorana Dinko Lukarić

18 September 2017 Friendly	Mladi Rudar	27:21	Zamet	Labin
18:00 CEST		Report		Stadium: Sportska dvorana Bale

=== Mid-season friendlies ===
17 January 2017 Friendly	Zamet	36:30	Kozala	Rijeka
17:00 CEST		Report		Stadium: Centar Zamet

28 February 2018 Friendly	Mornar-Crikvenica	28:35	Zamet	Crikvenica
19:00 CEST		Report		Stadium: GSD Crikvenica; Attendance: 120; Referee: Luketić & Tomović (Rijeka)

29 March 2018 Friendly	Zamet	33:28	Mornar-Crikvenica	Rijeka
18:00 CEST		Report		Stadium: Centar Zamet

7 April 2018 Friendly	Croatia U-19	31:30	(Croatia) Zamet	Poreč
17:30 CEST		Report		Stadium: SRC Veli Jože

== Premier League statistics ==
=== Shooting ===
No	Pos	Name	Gms.	Av.g.	Sht	%	Wing	%	7m	%	9m	%	6m	%	Brkt.	%	FB	%
2	LW	Damir Vučko	25 (25)	4,32	108/167	65%	54/89	61%	31/43	72%	0/6	0%	2/3	67%	3/6	50%	18/20	90%
3	LB	Vedran Žunić	4 (3)	0,00	0/0	0%	0/0	0%	0/0	0%	0/0	0%	0/0	0%	0/0	0%	0/0	0%
3	LW	Dario Jeličić	26 (11)	0,65	17/23	74%	11/16	69%	3/3	100%	1/2	50%	0/0	0%	0/0	0%	2/2	100%
5	RW	Martin Mozetić	16 (4)	0,56	9/15	60%	5/10	50%	0/1	0%	0/0	0%	1/1	100%	1/1	100%	2/2	100%
6	RW	Jakov Mozetić	7 (1)	0,00	0/1	0%	0/0	0%	0/0	0%	0/1	0%	0/0	0%	0/0	0%	0/0	0%
7	LB	Luka Grgurević	17 (3)	0,35	6/12	50%	4/6	67%	0/2	1/1	100%	0/2	0%	1/1	100%	0/0	0%	
8	CB	Patrik Martinović	25 (24)	3,52	88/145	61%	25/44	57%	1/1	100%	34/64	53%	18/22	82%	3/4	75%	7/10	70%
9	RW	Anton Katić	11 (1)	0,13	1/1	100%	0/0	0%	0/0	0%	1/1	100%	0/0	0%	0/0	0%	0/0	0%
9	CB	Nikola Njegovan	13 (13)	0,85	11/24	46%	1/1	100%	0/0	0%	7/20	35%	2/2	100%	0/0	0%	1/1	100%
11	RB	Marin Kružić	25 (24)	3,40	85/156	54%	6/10	60%	7/11	64%	48/104	46%	20/27	74%	1/1	100%	3/3	100%
12	GK	Fran Lučin	17 (16)	0,06	1/1	0/0	0%	0/0	0%	0/0	0%	0/0	0%	0/0	0%	1/1	100%	
13	LP	Veron Načinović	22 (19)	2,05	45/57	79%	0/0	0%	1/1	100%	0/2	0%	40/49	82%	2/2	100%	2/3	67%
14	RB	Tin Tomljanović	13 (5)	0,54	7/11	64%	0/0	0%	1/1	100%	2/5	40%	4/5	80%	0/0	0%	0/0	0%
15	RB	Matija Starčević	25 (22)	1,88	47/80	59%	0/1	0%	0/0	0%	26/50	52%	18/26	69%	3/3	100%	0/0	0%
16	GK	Marin Sorić	26 (24)	0,04	1/2	50%	0/0	0%	0/0	0%	0/0	0%	0/0	0%	0/0	0%	1/2	50%
17	CB	Antun Dunato	11 (6)	1,18	13/22	59%	0/0	0%	0/0	0%	7/13	54%	6/9	67%	0/0	0%	0/0	0%
18	RW	Ivo Katić	10 (7)	1,00	10/20	50%	5/12	42%	0/0	0%	1/3	33%	0/0	0%	2/3	67%	2/2	100%
19	LP	Ivan Majić	26 (26)	2,58	67/106	63%	0/0	0%	4/4	100%	0/11	0%	55/81	68%	0/0	0%	8/10	80%
20	LW	Dujam Dunato	22 (13)	0,55	12/16	75%	0/0	0%	4/5	80%	0/0	0%	8/11	73%	0/0	0%	0/0	0%
22	CB	Marko Mrakovčić	3 (1)	0,33	1/3	33%	0/0	0%	0/0	0%	0/2	0%	0/0	0%	0/0	0%	1/1	100%
23	CB	Matija Golik	25 (25)	5,28	132/202	65%	0/0	35/45	78%	52/93	56%	36/51	71%	3/4	75%	6/9	67%	
24	LB	Zhao Chen	12 (12)	4,50	54/107	50%	0/0	0%	0/0	0%	44/95	46%	9/10	90%	1/1	100%	0/1	0%
26	GK	Wang Quan	13 (13)	0,00	0/2	0%	0/0	0%	0/0	0%	0/1	0%	0/0	0%	0/0	0%	0/1	0%

Updated to match(es) played on 2 June 2018. Source: Premier league Rukometstat.com

=== Goalkeepers ===
No	Name	Gms.	Av.S.	Saves	%	Wing	%	7m	%	9m	%	6m	%	Brkt.	%	FB	%
12	Fran Lučin	17 (16)	4,18	71/243	29%	11/39	28%	3/25	12%	39/103	38%	11/47	23%	3/12	25%	4/17	24%
12	Igor Trivunović	1 (1)	1,00	1/5	20%	0/0	0%	1/1	100%	0/2	0%	0/2	0%	0/0	0%	0/0	0%
16	Marin Sorić	26 (24)	3,69	96/409	23%	13/59	22%	9/51	18%	50/150	33%	19/101	19%	2/15	13%	3/33	9%
26	Wang Quan	13 (13)	6,38	83/280	30%	12/31	39%	8/26	31%	42/129	33%	17/68	25%	0/8	0%	4/18	22%

Updated to match(es) played on 2 June 2018. Source: Premier league Rukometstat.com

=== Top goalscorers ===
No	Name	Gls	Avg	%
23	Matija Golik	132/202	5,28	65%
2	Damir Vučko	108/167	4,32	65%
18	Partik Martinović	88/145	3,52	61%
11	Marin Kružić	85/156	3,40	54%
19	Ivan Majić	67/106	2,58	63%
24	Zhao Chen	54/107	4,50	50%
15	Matija Starević	47/80	1,88	59%
13	Veron Načinović	45/57	2,05	79%
3	Dario Jeličić	17/23	9,65	74%
17	Antun Dunato	13/22	1,18	59%

Updated to match(es) played on 2 June 2018. Source: Premier league Rukometstat.com

=== 7m ===
No	Name	Gls	%
23	Matija Golik	35/45	77,8%
2	Damir Vučko	31/43	72,1%
11	Marin Kružić	7/11	64%
19	Ivan Majić	4/4	100%
20	Dujam Dunato	4/5	80%

Updated to match(es) played on 2 June 2018. Source: Premier league Rukometstat.com

=== Assists ===
No	Name	As	Av.
19	Matija Golik	37	1,48
11	Marin Kružić	23	0,92
15	Matija Starčević	16	0,64
8	Patrik Martinović	10	0,40
24	Zhao Chen	8	0,67
17	Antun Dunato	6	0,55
2	Damir Vučko	4	0,16
19	Ivan Majić	2	0,08
14	Tin Tomljanović	2	0,15
22	Marko Mrakovičić	1	0,33
3	Vedran Žunić	1	0,25
9	Nikola Njegovan	1	0,08
7	Luka Grgurević	1	0,06

Updated to match(es) played on 2 June 2018. Source: Premier league Rukometstat.com

=== Punishment drawn ===
No	Name	Drawn	Avg.
23	Matija Golik	12	0,48
8	Patrik Martinović	11	0,44
19	Ivan Majić	10	0,38
11	Marin Kružić	7	0,28
24	Zhao Chen	6	0,50
15	Matija Starčević	6	0,24
20	Dujam Dunato	4	0,36
13	Veron Načinović	4	0,18
2	Damir Vučko	4	0,16
22	Marko Mrakovičić	1	0,33

Updated to match(es) played on 2 June 2018. Source: Premier league Rukometstat.com

=== 2m punishments ===
No	Name	2m	Avg.
19	Ivan Majić	17	0,65
11	Marin Kružić	12	0,48
23	Matija Golik	9	0,36
13	Veron Načinović	7	0,32
8	Patrik Martinović	6	0,24
20	Dujam Dunato	5	0,24

Updated to match(es) played on 2 June 2018. Source: Premier league Rukometstat.com

=== Yellow cards ===
No	Name	Booked	Avg.
11	Marin Kružić	14	0,56
19	Ivan Majić	12	0,46
8	Patrik Martinović	8	0,32
24	Zhao Chen	7	0,58
23	Matija Golik	6	0,24
13	Veron Načinović	3	0,14
	Bench	3	

Updated to match(es) played on 2 June 2018. Source: Premier league Rukometstat.com

== Croatian Cup statistics ==
Number	Position	Player	Apps	Goals			
Number	Position	Player	2	LW	(Croatia) Damir Vučko	1	4
3	LW	(Croatia) Dario Jeličić	2	0			
5	RW	(Croatia) Martin Mozetić	1	0			
6	RW	(Croatia) Jakov Mozetić	2	0			
7	LB	(Croatia) Luka Grgurević	2	1			
8	CB	(Croatia) Patrik Martinović	2	3			
9	CB	(Croatia) Nikola Njegovan	1	4			
11	RB	(Croatia) Marin Kružić	2	11			
12	GK	(Croatia) Fran Lučin	2	0			
13	LP	(Croatia) Veron Načinović	1	3			
14	RB	(Croatia) Matija Starčević	1	6			
16	GK	(Croatia) Marin Sorić	2	0			
17	CB	(Croatia) Antun Dunato	1	0			
18	LP	(Croatia) Ivo Katić	1	1			
19	LP	(Croatia) Ivan Majić	1	3			
20	LW	(Croatia) Dujam Dunato	2	1			
22	CB	(Croatia) Marko Mrakovčić	1	0			
23	CB	(Croatia) Matija Golik	2	13			

Updated to match(es) played on 7 February 2018. Source: Hrvatski Kup SportCom.hr

== Transfers ==
=== In ===
Date	Position	Player	From	To
15 June 2017	LW	(Croatia) Damir Vučko	(Croatia) Retirement	Zamet
4 July 2017	CB	(Croatia) Antun Dunato	(Croatia) Ribola Kaštela	Zamet
4 July 2017	RW	(Croatia) Dujam Dunato	(Croatia) Varaždin 1930	Zamet
27 July 2017	LB	(Croatia) Vedran Žunić	Retirement	Zamet
30 July 2017	LP	(Croatia) Marko Kačanić	(Croatia) Kozala	RK Zamet
9 February 2018	CB	(Croatia) Nikola Njegovan	(Croatia) Dubrava Zagreb	RK Zamet
16 February 2018	CB	(China) Zhao Chen	(China) Jiangsu	RK Zamet
16 February 2018	GK	(China) Wang Quan	(China) Jiangsu	RK Zamet

=== Out ===
Date	Position	Player	From	To
18 June 2017	GK	(Croatia) Marin Đurica	(Croatia) Zamet	(Slovenia) Maribor
18 June 2017	LP	(Croatia) Tin Lučin	(Croatia) Zamet	(Croatia) PPD Zagreb
28 June 2017	LB	(Croatia) Paulo Grozdek	(Croatia) Zamet	(Poland) MKS Kalisz
13 August 2017	RW	(Croatia) Filip Glavaš	(Croatia) Zamet	(Croatia) Varaždin 1930
13 August 2017	LP	(Croatia) Jadranko Stojanović	(Croatia) Zamet	(Croatia) Varaždin 1930
13 August 2017	LP	(Croatia) Marko Kačanić	(Croatia) Zamet	Retirement
13 August 2017	LP	(Croatia) Raul Valković	(Croatia) Zamet	(Croatia) Kozala
13 December 2017	LB	(Croatia) Vedran Žunić	(Croatia) Zamet	Retirement

Source: Hrsport.net

== Sources ==
- Hrs.hr
- Rk-zamet.hr
- SportCom.hr
- Sport.net.hr
- Rezultati.com
