= Alvaro Načinović =

Croatian handball player (born 1966)

Personal information
- Full name: Alvaro Načinović
- Nationality: Croatian
- Born: 22 March 1966 (age 60) Rijeka, SFR Yugoslavia
- Height: 1.95 m (6 ft 5 in)

Sport
- Sport: Handball
- Position: Line player
- Current club: Retired
- Number: 8

Youth career
- Years: Team
- 1980-1983: RK Zamet

Senior clubs
- Years: Team
- 1983–1991: Zamet
- 1991–1992: Zagreb Loto
- 1992–1993: Zamet
- 1993–1998: Pivovarna Laško Celje
- 1998–1999: Zamet Autotrans
- 2000–2001: Pivovarna Laško Celje
- 2001–2006: Crikvenica
National team
Years	Team	Apps	
1985–1987	Yugoslavia U-21	20	
1988–1990	Yugoslavia	33	
1992–2000	Croatia	105	(165)
Title
2007–2010	Sports director	Zamet	
2012–2014	Sports director	Zamet	
2016–present	Sports director	Kozala	
Medal record
Representing Yugoslavia
U-21 World Championship
Bronze medal – third place	1985 Italy	Team
Gold medal – first place	1987 Yugoslavia	Team
Olympic Games
Bronze medal – third place	1988 Seoul	Team
Representing Croatia
Men's Handball
Mediterranean Games
Gold medal – first place	1993 Languedoc-Roussillon	Team
European Championship
Bronze medal – third place	1994 Portugal	Team
World Championship
Silver medal – second place	1995 Island	Team
Olympic Games
Gold medal – first place	1996 Atlanta	Team
Super Cup
Silver medal – second place	1999 Germany	Team

Alvaro Načinović (born 22 March 1966) is a former Croatian handball player who competed for Yugoslavia and Croatia respectively.

He played for his hometown club Zamet Rijeka with whom he entered into the Yugoslav First League in 1987 after winning the Second League in Kać. The same year he won the IHF Men's Junior World Championship with Yugoslavia U-21 in his club's home venue in Rijeka. Yugoslavia beat Spain in the final.

In 1992 Načinović played for RK Zagreb Loto with whom he won the European Champions Cup. He also spent six years in Slovenia playing for RK Pivovarna Laško Celje with a brief season at Zamet before coming to RK Crikvenica. Načinović spent five years in Crikvenica before retiring in 2006.

He won the bronze medal with Yugoslavia at the 1988 Summer Olympics and also captained the national team of Croatia to a gold medal at the 1996 Summer Olympics, silver medal at the 1995 World Championship and a bronze medal at the 1994 World Championship. He made 105 appearances for the national team scoring 165 goals.

Since April 2016 he is the sports director of RK Kozala.

== Career ==
Načinović first played for his hometown club of Zamet at youth level. He started playing for the senior squad in March 1983.

In 1987 Zamet won the Yugoslav Second League and got promoted to Yugoslav First League. Two years later after the departure of Darko Dunato, Načinović became team captain.

After five seasons in the first Yugoslav league Načinović transferred to Zagreb Loto. That season Načinović was part of a historic Zagreb team which won Croatian league, Croatian Cup and European Champions Cup.

Načinović returned to Zamet in the summer of 1992. In September of the same year the club played against Laško Pivovara Celje in the first round of European Champions Cup.

With poor league results and a coaching aftermath going in his club Načinović left for Celje at the end of the season. He played in Celje for five years playing top level handball and winning the Slovenian league and cup every year. In 1995 he played against Badel 1862 Zagreb in the 1/8 final of the EHF Champions League and lost by one goal on aggregate. The next season they got to the semi-final and lost to Barcelona by one goal on aggregate. The next season Celje was once again eliminated in the semi-final, by RK Zagreb.

In 1998 Načinović returned to Zamet then Zamet Autotrans for a season helping them in EHF City Cup and league. After a season and a half he returned to Laško Pivovara Celje where he dominated the league and cup for two more years.

In 2001 Načinović went to play for RK Crikvenica under his former teammate and coach Drago Žiljak. His stay in Crikvenica was the club's golden era, playing in the Croatian First League and staying there for five seasons. The club's success was due to veteran players such as Načinović, Mladen Prskalo, Marin Mišković, Zvonimir Kutija, Mario Brož, Dario Jagić, Janko Mavrović and younger players like Mirjan Horvat and Igor Montanari Knez. In 2006 Načinović retired at the club.

== International career ==
As a young player Načinović showed great promise and got called up to play for Yugoslav U-19 team at IHF Men's Junior World Championship in Italy 1985 and Yugoslavia in 1987 where his team and won the final against Spain in his hometown of Rijeka at Dvorana Mladosti. Načinović debuted for Yugoslavia in June 1988 in a match against Japan which was played in Pucarevo. In the same month he played at the tournament 27th Trophy of Yugoslavia which was played in Skopje.

Three months later Načinović competed at 1988 Summer Olympics where Yugoslavia got to the semi-finals losing (18:24) to Soviet Union who would win the tournament. Yugoslavia won third place defeating Hungary 27:23.

Načinović made 33 appearances for the Yugoslavia national handball team.

Načinović also played for Croatia national handball team. He played in Croatia's first tournament appearance at 1993 Mediterranean Games in Languedoc-Roussillon where they won a gold medal.

Načinović competed for Croatia in eight major tournaments winning a bronze medal at 1994 European Championship, silver medals at 1995 World Championship, and a gold medal at 1996 Summer Olympics in Atlanta. In Atalanta he scored the first goal for Croatia at the tournament in the first match against Switzerland.

After the tournament he retired along with a few of the older player from Atlanta. But he returned in 1997 after Croatia's poor performances he returned to help the national team. He later played at the 1998 European Championship in Italy and at the 1999 Super Cup in Germany.

Načinović retired from the Croatian national team in 2000 although his wish was to retire at the 2000 European Championship in Croatia it didn't come true due to coach Zdravko Zovko not calling him up.

== Retirement ==
Since his retirement from professional handball Načinović has become a sports director at RK Zamet.

In 2012 Načinović became a member of The Committee of State Award for Sport which function is deciding and giving the most prestigious Croatian sports award the Franjo Bučar State Award for Sport. The same year he appeared in a documentary called Riječki Olimpijci.

In 2016 he appeared in two documentaries Od ponora do Olimpa and Prvi Put which follows the events of the 1996 Summer Olympics in Atlanta were Croatia won their first Olympic gold medal in handball and in general.

== Personal life ==
Načinović has a son named Veron who is currently playing handball for THW Kiel.

== Honours ==
RK Zamet

- Yugoslav Second League (1): 1986–87

RK Zagreb Loto

- Croatian First A League (1): 1992
- Croatian Cup (1): 1992
- European Champions Cup (1): 1991–92

RK Celje Pivovara Laško

- Slovenian First League (7): 1993-94, 1994–95, 1995–96, 1996–97, 1997–98, 1999-00, 2000–01
- Slovenian Cup (7): 1994, 1995, 1996, 1997, 1998, 2000, 2001

Individual

- Ivica Jobo Kurtini Award: 1988
- Best Croatian sports team by: COC: 1995 and 1996
- Franjo Bučar State Award for Sport - 1996
- Plack with names of Rijeka's Olympic medalists - 2014
- RK Zamet hall of fame - 2015

Yugoslavia

- 1985 IHF Junior World Championship Italy - 3rd
- 1987 IHF Junior World Championship Yugoslavia - 1st
- 1988 Summer Olympics Seoul - 3rd

Croatia

- 1993 Mediterranean Games Languedoc-Roussillon - 1st
- 1994 European Championship Portugal - 3rd
- 1995 World Championship Island - 2nd
- 1996 European Championship Spain- 5th
- 1996 Summer Olympics Atlanta - 1st
- 1998 European Championship Italy - 8th
- 1999 Super Cup Germany - 2nd

== Orders ==
- Order of Danica Hrvatska with face of Franjo Bučar - 1995

== Sources ==
- Petar Orgulić - 50 godina rukometa u Rijeci (2005), Adriapublic
- Mišo Cvijanović, Igor Duvnjak, Tonko Kraljić & Orlando Rivetti - 4 ASA (2007), Adriapublic

Sporting positions
Preceded by Unknown; 1	Captain of Croatia; 1992–1996	Succeeded by Goran Perkovac; 3
