= Darko Franović =

Croatian handball player (born 1967)

Personal information
- Full name: Darko Franović
- Nationality: Croatian
- Born: 2 October 1967 (age 59) Crikvenica, SFR Yugoslavia

Sport
- Sport: Handball
- Number: 14

Youth career
- Years: Team
- 1980-1983: RK Crikvenica

Senior clubs
- Years: Team
- 1983-1988: RK Crikvenica
- 1988-1993: RK Zamet
- 1993-1996: RK Karlovačka Pivovara
- 1996-1997: RK Crikvenica
- 1997-1999: RK Zamet Autotrans
National team
Years	Team	Apps
1993-1995	Croatia	16
Medal record
Representing Croatia
Men's Handball
European Championship
Bronze medal – third place	1994 Portugal	Team

Darko Franović (born 2 October 1967) is a former Croatian handball player who competed in the 1994 European Men's Handball Championship in Portugal.

== Orders ==
- Order of Danica Hrvatska with face of Franjo Bučar - 1995
