= Egon Paljar =

Croatian handball player (born 1974)

Personal information
- Nationality: Croatian
- Born: 15 April 1974 (age 52) Zavidovići, SFR Yugoslavia

Sport
- Sport: Handball
- Position: Centre Back
- Current club: Retired

Youth career
- Years: Team
- –: RK Krivaja Zavidovići

Senior clubs
- Years: Team
- 1991–1994: RK Krivaja Zavidovići
- 1994–1997: SG Wallau-Massenheim
- 1998–1999: Badel 1862 Zagreb
- 2000: Panellinios AC Athens
- 2001: GC Amicitia Zürich
- 2001–2002: Zamet Crotek Rijeka
- 2002–2003: RK Krivaja Zavidovići
- 2003–2004: RK Zagreb
- 2004–2005: Medveščak Infosistem
- 2005–2012: Crikvenica
National team
Years	Team	Apps	(Gls)
1996–1999	Croatia	40	(?)

Teams managed
- 2012–2017: RK Crikvenica
- 2017-present: RK Selce

Egon Paljar (born 15 April 1974) is a former Croatian national team handball player. He is currently coach of RK Selce.

Paljar played for clubs in Croatia, Germany, Bosnia and Herzegovina, Greece and Switzerland. He last played for RK Crikvenica where he retired and coached the team after retiring from playing. He is currently coach of RK Selce.

Paljar played 40 international matches for Croatia and represented his country at 1998 European Championship.

== Honours ==
=== RK Zagreb ===
- Croatian First A League (3): 1997–98, 1998–99, 2003–04
- Croatian Cup (3): 1998, 1999, 2004
- EHF Champions League Final (1): 1998–99
