= Janko Mavrović =

Croatian handball player (born 1977)

Personal information
- Nationality: Croatian
- Born: 24 October 1977 (age 48) Rijeka, SFR Yugoslavia
- Height: 190 m (620 ft)

Sport
- Sport: Handball
- Position: Left wing, Centre back
- Current club: Retired
- Number: 10

Youth career
- Years: Team
- –: RK Kvarner

Senior clubs
- Years: Team
- 1994-1995: RK Kvarner
- 1995-1996: RK Pećine
- 1996-2001: RK Crikvenica
- 2001-2003: RK Zamet Crotek
- 2003-2005: RK Crikvenica
- 2005-2011: RK Buzet

Janko Mavrović (born 24 October 1977) is a former Croatian team handball player who started out in left wing position and was later switched to centre back position.

He played for his local hometown clubs RK Kvarner, RK Pećine, RK Zamet, RK Crikvenica from Crikvenica and RK Buzet from Buzet.

== Honours ==
RK Buzet

- Croatian First League (1): 2008-09
