= Zhao Chen =

Chinese handball player (born 1989)

Personal information
- Nationality: Chinese
- Born: 24 June 1989 (age 37) Shenyang, China
- Height: 2.03 m (6 ft 8 in)

Sport
- Sport: Handball
- Position: Left Back
- Current club: Zamet
- Number: 24

Senior clubs
- Years: Team
- –: Jiangsu Suzhou
- 2018–: RK Zamet
National team
- Years: Team
- 2010–: China

Zhao Chen (born 24 June 1989) is a Chinese international handballer, who plays for Croatian club RK Zamet.

As an international for the China men's national handball team he has competed at the 2010 Asian Games, and the 2010, 2012, 2014, 2016 and 2018 editions the Asian Men's Handball Championship.
