= Robert Savković =

Croatian handball player (born 1978)

Personal information
- Nationality: Croatian
- Born: 27 September 1978 (age 48) Rijeka, Croatia
- Height: 1.97 m (6 ft 6 in)

Sport
- Sport: Handball
- Position: Left back
- Number: 10

Youth career
- Years: Team
- 1990-1995: RK Zamet

Senior clubs
- Years: Team
- 1995-1999: RK Zamet
- 1999-2000: SG West Wien
- 2000-2001: RK Badel 1862 Zagreb
- 2001: Handball Conegliano
- 2002: IK Sävehof
- 2002-2003: RK Zamet Crotek
- 2003-2004: Aalborg Håndbold
- 2004-2005: Team Helsinge
- 2005-2006: OAR Coruña
- 2006-2007: RK Zamet
- 2007-2008: Villefranche
- 2008-2009: SD Teucro
- 2009-2010: RK Zamet
- 2010-2011: RK Crikvenica
- 2013-2014: RK Crikvenica
National team
Years	Team	Apps
1997-1999	Croatia U-21	40

Robert Savković (born 27 September 1978) is a retired Croatian handball player. He last played for RK Crikvenica and he also played for Croatian national team U-21.

== Career ==
Savković started his career in hometown club RK Zamet. In his first season with the club he helped them return to the top flight by winning the First B League. He also won the Croatian U-18 Championship with a very talented generation that featured Nikola Blažičko, Mirza Džomba, Renato Sulić and Milan Uzelac. In 1998 Savković debuted in his first European competition, in the EHF Cup.

In 1999 Savković joined Austrian SG West Wien. He stayed with the club for only one season. In 2000 he transfer'd to RK Badel 1862 Zagreb.

== Honours ==
RK Zamet

- Croatian Championship U-18 (1): 1996
- Croatian First B League (1): 1995-1996

RK Zagreb

- Croatian First A League (1): 2000-01
