= Igor Vujić =

Croatian handball player (born 1987)

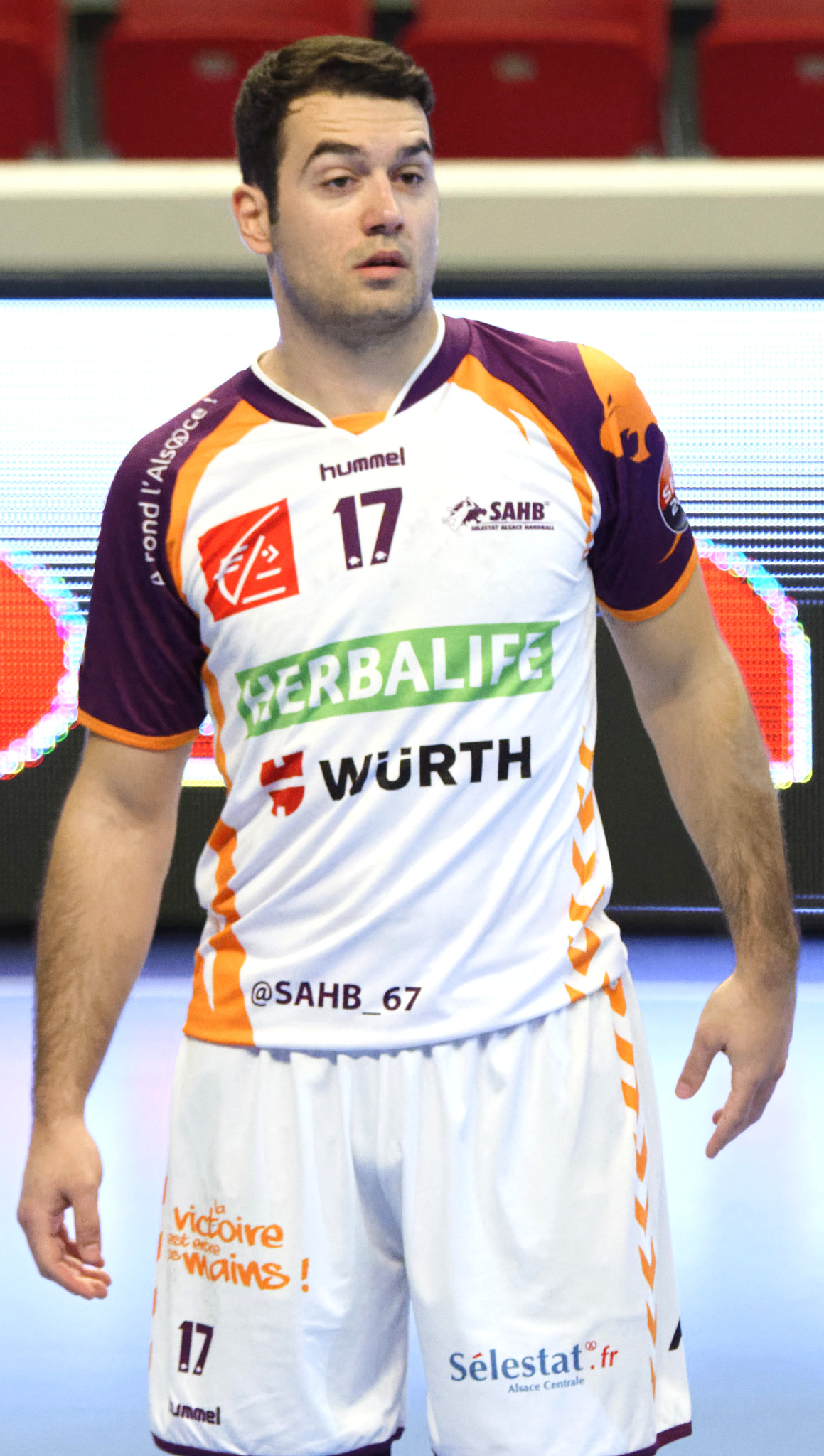
- Igor Vujić (2015)

Personal information
- Nationality: Croatian/Slovenian
- Born: 28 September 1987 (age 39) Koper, SFR Yugoslavia
- Height: 1.97 m (6 ft 6 in)

Sport
- Sport: Handball
- Position: Left back
- Current club: RK Zagreb
- Number: 17

Senior clubs
- Years: Team
- 2004-2007: RK Umag
- 2007-2011: RD Slovan
- 2011-2012: RK Maribor Branik
- 2012: RK Zamet
- 2012-2014: RK Nexe Našice
- 2014-2016: Sélestat Alsace Handball
- 2016-present: PPD Zagreb
National team
- Years: Team
- 2013: Croatia

Igor Vujić (born 28 September 1987) is a Croatian handball player who plays for PPD Zagreb.

In March 2013 Vujić was invited to play for the national team of Croatia by head coach Slavko Goluža.

== Personal life ==
Vujić speaks Croatian, Slovenian, English, French and Italian.

== Honours ==
Zamet

- Croatian Cup
  - Finalist (1): 2012

NEXE

- Dukat Premier League
  - Runner-up (2): 2012–13, 2013–14

Sélestat

- LNH Division 2
  - Promotion (1): 2015-16
