= Drago Žiljak =

Croatian handball player and coach (born 1960)

Personal information
- Full name: Dragutin Žiljak
- Nationality: Croatian
- Born: 14 January 1960 (age 66) Rijeka, SFR Yugoslavia

Sport
- Sport: Handball
- Position: Left wing
- Current club: Retired
- Number: 3

Youth career
- Years: Team
- 1974: RK Zamet
- 1974–1976: RK Kvarner

Senior clubs
- Years: Team
- 1976–1981: RK Kvarner
- 1981–1991: RK Zamet
National team
- Years: Team
- 1975–1976: SR Croatia U-17
- 1976–1977: SR Croatia U-18
- 1977–1978: SR Croatia U-19
- 1978–1979: SR Croatia U-20
- 1978–1979: Yugoslavia U-21

Teams managed
- 1981–1984: University of Rijeka (Ass.)
- 1991–1992: RK Zamet
- 1993: ŽRK Turnić Mladost
- 1993–1994: RK Zamet
- 1995–1997: RK Zamet
- 1997–2007: RK Crikvenica
- 2007–2009: RK Zamet
- 2009–2011: RK Kvarner Kostrena
- 2011–2012: ŽRK Zamet
- 2018: RK Zamet
- 2020-: ŽRK Zamet

Drago Žiljak (born 14 January 1960) is a former Croatian handball player and coach. He is currently the head coach of women's side ŽRK Zamet.

== Playing career ==
Žiljak started playing handball in 1974 when he was picked by coach Vjekoslav Sardelić to play for the U-14 team of RK Zamet at the Croatian U-14 Championship. Zamet won the championship. He opted to play for then First League side RK Kvarner.

In 1976 Žiljak started playing for the senior team who were relegated the season before to the Yugoslav Second League - North. He played at Kvarner for five seasons being in top positions in the Second League but failing to reach first place and gain promotion. From 1975 to 1978 Žiljak was often selected to play for the youth selection of SR Croatia. In 1979 he played for the U-21 squad of Yugoslavia at the Balkanijada tournament in Varaždin.

In 1981 Žiljak was signed by city rival RK Zamet. During his first few seasons with the club Žiljak established himself as a regular player and secured his position throughout his tenure. During the 1983-84 Zamet finished second in the league with just a point short of first place which was secured by Jugović Kać. Three seasons later Zamet finished in first place and got promoted to the First League. Žiljak still played regularly during Zamet's First league flight until the collapse of the Yugoslav league in 1991 when he went into retirement.

== Coaching career ==
=== RK Zamet ===
On October 2, 1991 it was announced that Žiljak would be the new head coach of RK Zamet.

Due to the collapse of the Yugoslav league Žiljak had to lead his team through friendly tournaments during the first part of the 1991-92 tournament. Žiljak had lost a few key players in the mist of there not being a league most prominently his captain Alvaro Načinović. On March 21 the 1992 season started with six clubs in the First A League. His first official league game as head coach was against Moslavina in a home win of 22:17 at Dvorana Mladosti. Žiljak led Zamet to the championship play-offs swiftly in third place. In the semi-final play-offs Žiljak and his side defeated Coning Medveščak 26:30 in the second away match having ended the first match in a draw of 22:22. Zamet proceeded to the finals having qualified for the European Champions Cup. The first final match was playing in a draw of 22:22 at Dvorana Mladosti. The second match played in Kutija Šibica Zamet lost 25:23 and finished in second place as vice-champions. Žiljak also led his to the semi-final of the Croatian Cup where they lost to Coning Medveščak 24:18.

In September 1992 Žiljak led Zamet to their first European match in history. Zamet faced RK Pivovara Laško Celje in the First round of the European Champions Cup. The first match was played in Velenje where Celje won 25:17. The second match was played on September 23 at Dvorana Dinko Lukarić where Zamet won 18:11 and where eliminated from the tournament with Celje winning 35:36 on aggregate. After the fatal European loss Zamet's domestic results where bad compared to the previous season. Žiljak resigned in October after a loss against RK Sisak 26:23.

=== ŽRK Turnić Mladost ===
Žiljak had at coaching the women's team of Turnić in 1993 before returning to RK Zamet.

=== RK Zamet: Second Spell ===
During Žiljak's second spell at Zamet they finished in eight place avoiding relegation. With all of the star players gone Žiljak could only count on young players such as Mirza Džomba and Nikola Blažičko.

=== RK Zamet: Third Spell ===
After Zamet was relegated to the First B League Žiljak was appointed head coach again.

This spell proved a big successful. Within a season Žiljak led Zamet back to the First A League with 21 wins and 1 loss. Žiljak's 1996-97 season with Zamet back in the top tier in fifth place. Although a solid result for a team back from the second tier the board sacked Žiljak at the end of the season.

=== RK Crikvenica ===
During the summer of 1997 Žiljak became the head coach of RK Crikvenica.

In Žiljak's first season Crikvenica finished fourth in the First B League, The next season Žiljak led his side to a third-place position in the league and to the semi-finals of the Croatian Cup where they lost to RK Medveščak 29:22. They also lost the third place match to RK Brodokumer Split.

After stunning results in the few past seasons RK Crikvenica was promoted to the newly created Croatian First League in 2001. With this new progress Žiljak signed his old RK Zamet players Alvaro Načinović and Mladen Prskalo to strengthen his team. Žiljak's first season with Crikvenica in the First league ended with 10 place avoiding the relegation play-offs. The 2002-03 season ended up with them finishing in 11 place avoiding relegation play-offs again and reaching the quarter-finals of the Croatian Cup where they lost to RK Zagreb.

In the 2003-04 Crikvenica finished 7 during the regular part of the season missing just one point to qualify for the Championship play-offs instead they played the relegation play-offs. Žiljak once again led his team to secure another First League season. The next two seasons also saw avoiding relegation for Crikvenica.

=== RK Zamet: Fourth Spell ===
On February 24, 2007 Žiljak became the head coach RK Zamet for the fourth time. Žiljak's task during the second half of the 2006-07 season was avoiding relegation which he did finishing in 10th place.

His second season saw Zamet finishing in 8 place on solid ground. Next season the Dukat First League was replaced with the Dukat Premier League. Žiljak with only young players and a couple of veteran players by his side avoided relegation finishing in 14 place. After the 2008-09 season Žiljak was sacked.

=== RK Kvarner Kostrena ===
In the summer of 2009 Žiljak took over as head coach of Kvarner Kostrena. He coach the side for two seasons not making any good results but still avoiding relegation.

=== ŽRK Zamet ===
On July 17 Žiljak was appointed head coach of the women's club of Zamet.

Žiljak started his season with ŽRK Zamet on solid ground beating city rivals Orijent Proflex, Tvin Virovitica, Koka and others. He led his side to the semi-finals of the Croatian Cup where they lost to ŽRK Lokomotiva Zagreb 33:34 to witch Žiljak expressed in the media that the referees sided for the Zagreb club. At the end of the season ŽRK Zamet finished in a solid 7 place position.

On August 29 Žiljak announced that he'd be stepping down as coach of ŽRK Zamet due to his new work environment being too much time consuming for him to run the team.

=== RK Zamet: Fifth Spell ===
RK Zamet called Žiljak up during the second half of 2017–18 season when the club was last in the league and near relegation. He saved the club from relegation, not losing a single home match with a team of young homegrown players and two Chinese imports.

After the season ended Žiljak and the club parted ways respectively.

== Honours ==
=== As player ===
RK Zamet

- Yugoslav Second League (1): 1986-87
- Croatian U-14 Championship (1): 1974

RK Kvarner

- Croatian U-21 Championship (1): 1979

=== As coach ===
RK Zamet

- Croatian First A League Vice-champions (1): 1992
- Croatian First B League Winners (1): 1995-96

RK Crikvenica

- Croatian First B League Promotion (1): 2000-01
- Croatian Cup Fourth place (1): 1999

== Sources ==
- Petar Orgulić - 50 godina rukometa u Rijeci (2005), Adria public
