= Igor Dokmanović =

Croatian handball player and coach (born 1973)

Personal information
- Nationality: Croatian
- Born: 6 September 1973 (age 53) Rijeka, SFR Yugoslavia

Sport
- Sport: Handball
- Position: Goalkeeper
- Current club: Retired

Youth career
- Years: Team
- –: RK Zamet

Senior clubs
- Years: Team
- 1991–1996: RK Zamet
- 1996–2001: RK Plomin Linija Rudar Labin
- 2001–2007: RK Crikvenica
- 2007–2008: RK Zamet

Teams managed
- 2000–2001: Rudar Labin (Youth)
- 2007–2009: RK Zamet (GK coach)
- 2009–2012: RK Zamet (Youth)
- 2012: RK Zamet
- 2014–2016: RK Crikvenica
- 2016–present: Bergsøy IL
- 2018: Kosovo

Igor Dokmanović (born 6 September 1973) is a Croatian handball coach and former player. He is currently head coach at Norwegian club Bergsøy IL and since January 2018 coach at Kosovo men's national handball team.

In October 2012 Dokmanović became interim head coach of RK Zamet before the arrival of Irfan Smajlagić. He coached the team for one match which they won away against Gorica.

== Honours ==
=== Player ===
RK Zamet

- Croatian First A League Vice champions (1): 1992
- Croatian First B League (1): 1995-96

Rudar Labin

- Croatian First B League (1): 1999-2000
