= Marko Erstić =

Croatian handball player (born 1984)

Personal information
- Nationality: Croatian
- Born: 26 May 1984 (age 42) Rijeka, SFR Yugoslavia
- Height: 1.93 m (6 ft 4 in)

Sport
- Sport: Handball
- Position: Left wing
- Number: 14

Senior clubs
- Years: Team
- 2000-2009: RK Zamet
- 2009-2013: RK Mladi Rudar
- 2013-2016: RK Crikvenica

Marko Erstić (born 26 May 1984) is a Croatian handball player.

He played for nine years in RK Zamet. He has also played for RK Mladi Rudar and RK Crikvenica.

With RK Zamet he got to the Croatian Handball Cup final in 2001.
