= Marko Vidović =

Montenegrin footballer

Personal information
- Date of birth: 3 June 1988 (age 38)
- Place of birth: Belgrade, SFR Yugoslavia
- Height: 1.84 m (6 ft 1/2 in)
- Positions: Left back; midfielder; central defender

Youth career
- Partizan

Senior career*
Years	Team	Apps	(Gls)
2006–2008	Hajduk Beograd	32	(1)
2008–2010	Budućnost Podgorica	20	(0)
2010–2011	Anorthosis Famagusta	9	(0)
2011–2012	Levski Sofia	15	(0)
2012–2013	Budapest Honvéd	12	(0)
2013	Egri	9	(0)
2013–2014	Spartak Subotica	3	(0)
2014	Tiraspol	2	(0)
2014–2015	Budapest Honvéd	9	(0)
2015–2016	Partizani Tirana	3	(0)
2016–2017	Sinđelić Beograd	6	(0)
2017–2018	Bačka	5	(0)
2018–2020	Schiltigheim	23	(0)
2020–2021	Sloga Kraljevo	13	(0)
2021	Žarkovo	11	(1)

International career
2008	Montenegro U21	8	(0)
- * Club domestic league appearances and goals as of 19 May 2021

Marko Vidović (Serbian Cyrillic: Марко Видовић; born on 3 June 1988) is a Montenegrin footballer who plays as a left back.

== Club career ==
=== Serbia ===
Born in Belgrade, SR Serbia, SFR Yugoslavia, Vidović started playing football in the youth teams of FK Partizan. After that, he spent two years with FK Hajduk Beograd until January 2008 where he made his first senior appearances playing in the Serbian First League (2nd tier).

=== Budućnost Podgorica ===
In 2008, he joined FK Budućnost Podgorica in the Montenegrin First League which was coached by Miodrag Ješić. He was part of the squad that won the 2007–08 Montenegrin First League. While playing in Montenegro, he accepted a call to represent Montenegro on international level, having played 5 matches for the Montenegro national under-21 football team.

=== Anorthosis Famagusta ===
In 2010 Vidović joined Anorthosis Famagusta coached by Slavoljub Muslin. He made his debut against PFC CSKA Moscow in 2010–11 UEFA Europa League playoffs.

=== Levski Sofia ===
On 28 January 2011, the official Anorthosis site announced that Vidovic will join Levski Sofia on 1 February. One day later he arrived in Sofia and successfully passed the medical tests.

=== Hungary ===
In the season 2012-13 he played in Hungary in top league sides Budapest Honvéd FC and Egri FC.

=== Spartak Subotica ===
On July 12, 2013, he was presented as a new player of FK Spartak Subotica along with Stefan Cicmil and signed the contract on July 30.

He played with FK Partizani Tirana in the 2015–16 Albanian Superliga.

In summer 2016 he returned to Serbia and joined second-level side FK Sinđelić Beograd.

== Honours ==
Budućnost

- Montenegrin First League: 2007–08
