= Mirjan Horvat =

Croatian handball player (born 1983)

Personal information
- Nationality: Croatian
- Born: 25 November 1983 (age 42) Rijeka, SFR Yugoslavia
- Height: 1.91 m (6 ft 3 in)

Sport
- Sport: Handball
- Position: Line player
- Current club: Retired
- Number: 11

Senior clubs
- Years: Team
- 1999-2000: RK Zamet II
- 2000-2005: RK Zamet
- 2005-2007: RK Crikvenica
- 2007-2009: RK Zamet
- 2009-2011: RK Buzet
- 2011: RK Crikvenica
- 2011-2012: RK Senj

Mirjan Horvat (born 25 November 1983) was a Croatian handball player won played line player position.

He played in the EHF Cup with RK Zamet and in the EHF Challenge Cup with RK Buzet.
