= RK Crikvenica =

RK Mornar-Crikvenica
- Full name: Rukometni klub Mornar-Crikvenica
- Founded: September 2017 (as RK Mornar-Crikvenica)
- Arena: GSD Crikvenica
- Capacity: 1,050
- President: Goran Božić
- Head coach: Valter Matošević
- League: Second League (West)
- 2017–18: 1st
- Club colours

RK Mornar-Crikvenica (Rukometni Klub Mornar-Crikvenica) is a handball club from Crikvenica, Croatia, formed in 2017 by the merger of RK Crivenica and RK Mornar.

== History ==
=== RK Mornar (1980–2017) ===
RK Mornar was founded 26 May 1980 in Dramalj on the initiative of Stjepan Lončarić.

=== RK Crikvenica (1956–2017) ===
RK Crikvenica was founded in October 1956 in Crikvenica. The club was founded on the initiative of gymnasium gymnastics teacher Branko Banjanin. During the Yugoslav Handball Championship Crikvenica competed in lower-tier leagues. From 1985 the club didn't have a regulated sports facility so they played their home matches in Delnice, Senj and Rijeka until February 2003 when the city finally built them their ground GSD Crikvenica. The first match played in GSD Crikvenica was RK Crikvenica against RK Umag on 15 February 2003.

In 1999 Crikvenica reached the semi-final of the Croatian Handball Cup where they lost to Medveščak Zagreb (29:22). In 2001 due to reorganization of the Croatian handball league RK Crikvenica entered the First league and maintained 7 seasons in the first tier.

=== RK Crikvenica seasons ===
Season	Tier	Division	Pos.
1991–92	4	Third League	2nd
1992–93	2	First B League	6th
1993–94	2	First B League	10th
1994–95	2	First B League	6th
1995–96	2	First B League	7th
1996–97	2	First B League	3rd
1997–98	2	First B League	4th
1998–99	2	First B League	3rd
1999-00	2	First B League	8th
2000–01	2	First B League	5th
2000–01	1	First League	10th
2001–02	1	First League	11th
2002–03	1	First League	11th
2003–04	1	First League	11th

Season	Tier	Division	Pos.
2004–05	1	First League	10th
2005–06	1	First League	13th
2006–07	1	First League	15th
2007–08	2	Second League	2nd
2008–09	2	First League	2nd
2009–10	2	First League	4th
2010–11	2	First League	7th
2011–12	2	First League	9th
2012–13	2	First League	13th
2013–14	2	First League	3rd
2014–15	2	First League	7th
2015–16	2	First League	13th
2016–17	2	First League	12th
2017–18	3	Second League (West)	1st

== Technical staff ==
- (Croatia) President: Goran Božić
- (Croatia) Vice president: Dražen Manestar
- (Croatia) Head Coach: Valter Matošević
- (Croatia) Board members: Robert Hrelja, Senko Smoljan, Dario Butković

== Notable former players ==
- (Socialist Federal Republic of Yugoslavia) Darko Franović
- (Croatia) Alvaro Načinović
- (Croatia) Mladen Prskalo
- (Croatia) Marin Mišković
- (Croatia) Saša Nikšić
- (Croatia) Vladimir Matejčić
- (Croatia) Igor Dokmanović
- (Croatia) Janko Mavrović
- (Croatia) Bojan Pezelj
- (Croatia) Andrej Sekulić
- (Croatia) Igor Saršon
- (Croatia) Davor Šunjić
- (Croatia) Mirjan Horvat
- (Croatia) Egon Paljar
- (Croatia) Mateo Hrvatin
- (Croatia) Robert Savković
- (Croatia) Marko Erstić
- (Croatia) Igor Pejić
- (Croatia) Pave Župan
- (Croatia) Mario Broz
- (Croatia) Igor Montanari – Knez
- (Croatia) Jadranko Stoajnović
- (Croatia) Paulo Grozdek
- (Croatia) Moreno Car

== Notable former coaches ==
- (Croatia) Drago Žiljak (1997–2007)
- (Croatia) Ivan Munitić (2008–2011)

== Honours ==
=== League ===
- Primorje-Gorski Kotar County league (1): 1978–79
- Primorje-Istria league (1): 1984–95
- Second League (West) (1): 2017–18

=== Cup ===
- Croatian Cup Fourth place (1): 1999

== Sources ==
- Petar Orgulić – 50 godina rukometa u Rijeci (2004), Adriapublic
