= Ivan Ćosić (handballer) =

Croatian handball player (born 1986)

Personal information
- Nationality: Croatian
- Born: 23 May 1986 (age 40) Rijeka, Croatia
- Height: 1.91 m (6 ft 3 in)

Sport
- Sport: Handball
- Position: Centre back
- Current club: Neusser HV
- Number: 9

Youth career
- Years: Team
- –: RK Zamet

Senior clubs
- Years: Team
- 2003-2005: RK Zamet II
- 2004-2009: RK Zamet
- 2009-2010: Bodø HK
- 2010-2011: Sandefjord TIF
- 2011-2013: RK Zamet
- 2013-2014: RK Buzet
- 2014-2017: Neusser HV

Teams managed
- 2017-: Neusser HV U-23 (Assistant coach)

Ivan Ćosić (born 23 May 1986) is a former Croatian handballer.

== Honours ==
=== RK Zamet II ===
- 3. HRL - West
  - Winner (1): 2004-05

=== Sandefjord ===
- 1. Division
  - Promotion (1): 2010-11

=== RK Zamet ===
- Croatian Cup
  - Finalist (1): 2012
