= Marin Kružić =

Croatian handball player (born 1989)

Personal information
- Full name: Marin Kružić
- Nationality: Croatian
- Born: 11 September 1989 (age 37) Rijeka, SFR Yugoslavia
- Height: 1.93 m (6 ft 4 in)

Sport
- Sport: Handball
- Position: Right back
- Current club: RK Zamet
- Number: 15

Senior clubs
- Years: Team
- 2004-2007: RK Kvarner Kostrena
- 2007–2013: RK Zamet
- 2013–2015: RK NEXE Našice
- 2015–2016: RK Spačva Vinkovci
- 2016–2018: RK Zamet
- 2018–: RK Mornar-Crikvenica
National team
- Years: Team
- 2013: Croatia

Marin Kružić (born 11 September 1989) is a Croatian handball player who currently plays for RK Zamet.

== Career ==
Kružić started his senior career in RK Kvarner Kostrena in 2004.

He moved to RK Zamet in 2007. Kružić quickly established himself as a top player in Zamet.

In January 2013, got a call-up to train with the national team and to play in an upcoming against Norway. Few weeks before the match Kružić fractured his nose in training with the national team and could not play for weeks.

In 2013, when he moved to NEXE In Nexe he played in the SEHA League and in the EHF Cup.

In 2015, Kružić moved to RK Spačva Vinkovci where he played for one season. In August 2016, it was announced that Kružić would be returning to RK Zamet. He made all six appearances in the EHF Cup in 2016 with Zamet and scored 27 goals. Zamet was knocked out in the third qualifying round by MT Melsungen
