= Marin Sakić =

Croatian handball player (born 1987)

Personal information
- Nationality: Croatian
- Born: 8 June 1987 (age 39) Rijeka, Croatia
- Height: 2.00 m (6 ft 7 in)

Sport
- Sport: Handball
- Position: Line player
- Current club: RK NEXE Našice
- Number: 19

Youth career
- Years: Team
- 1999-2004: RK Zamet

Senior clubs
- Years: Team
- 2004-2005: RK Zamet II
- 2005-2013: RK Zamet
- 2013-2017: RK NEXE Našice
- 2017-: Váci KSE

Marin Sakić (born 8 June 1987) is a Croatian handballer, who plays in line player position for Váci KSE.

Sakić started in his career in his hometown club RK Zamet. He played for Zamet from 2005 to 2013.

From 2013 to 2017 Sakić played for NEXE Našice.

== Results ==
RK Zamet II

- 3. HRL - West
  - Winner (1): 2004-05

RK Zamet

- Croatian Cup
  - Finalist (1): 2012

RK NEXE Našice

- Dukat Premier League
  - Runner-up (4): 2013-14, 2014-15, 2015-16, 2016-17
- Croatian Cup
  - Finalist (3): 2012, 2015, 2017
  - Third place (1): 2016
