= Damir Vučko =

Croatian handball player (born 1990)

Personal information
- Nationality: Croatian
- Born: 24 April 1990 (age 36) Rijeka, Croatia
- Height: 1.83 m (6 ft 0 in)

Sport
- Sport: Handball
- Position: Left wing
- Current club: Retired
- Number: 2

Senior clubs
- Years: Team
- 2007–2015: RK Zamet
- 2017–2018: RK Zamet
- 2018–: RK Buzet
National team
- Years: Team
- 2008–2010: Croatia U-21
Medal record
Youth World Championship
Gold medal – first place	2009 Tunis	Team

Damir Vučko (born 24 April 1990) was a Croatian handball player. He played for RK Buzet.

Vučko played for RK Zamet from 2007 to 2015. He didn't win any trophies with the club but he did reach the final of the Croatian Cup in 2012. The same year he participated in the EHF Cup with the club.

He also played for the youth national team for 2 years. With the team he won the IHF Men's Youth World Championship in 2009.

On June 17, 2017, Vučko appeared in the 60 anniversary match for RK Zamet. After the match it was announced that he would come out of retirement and play for the senior team.

== Honours ==
Zamet

- Croatian Cup
  - Finalist: 2012

Individual

- Dražen Petrović Award - 2009
