= Marin Mišković =

Croatian handball player (born 1966)

Personal information
- Full name: Marin Mišković
- Nationality: Croatian
- Born: 5 February 1966 (age 60) Rijeka, SFR Yugoslavia

Sport
- Sport: Handball
- Current club: Retired
- Number: 10

Senior clubs
- Years: Team
- 1983–1992: RK Zamet
- 1992–1993: VfL Günzburg
- 1993–1994: RK Nova Gorica
- 1994–1995: RK Buje
- 1995–1998: RK Zamet
- 1998–2005: RK Crikvenica
National team
- Years: Team
- 1984–1985: SR Croatia U-21

Teams managed
- 2007–2009: RK Zamet (Assistant)
- 2009–2012: RK Zamet (Coaching staff)
- 2012–2013: RK Zamet (Assistant)
- 2013–2017: RK Zamet
- 2017-present: RK Zamet U-19
- 2018: RK Zamet (Assistant)

Marin Mišković (born 5 February 1966) is a former Croatian handball player.

== Honours ==
Zamet

- Croatian First A League Vice-champions (1): 1992
- Croatian First B League (1): 1995–96
- Yugoslav Second League (1): 1986–87

Crikvenica

- Croatian First B League Promotion (1): 2000–01
