= Croatia men's national handball team =

Olympic handball team

Croatia

Information
- Nickname: 2003–2009: Pakleni (Hellish); 2009–2023: Kauboji (Cowboys)
- Association: Croatian Handball Federation
- Coach: Dagur Sigurðsson
- Assistant coach: Valter Matošević; Denis Špoljarić
- Captain: Ivan Martinović
- Most caps: Domagoj Duvnjak (257)
- Most goals: Domagoj Duvnjak (771)

Colours
1st	2nd

Results

Summer Olympics
- Appearances: 6 (First in 1996)
- Best result: (gold) 1st (1996, 2004)

World Championship
- Appearances: 16 (First in 1995)
- Best result: (gold) 1st (2003)

European Championship
- Appearances: 17 (First in 1994)
- Best result: (silver) 2nd (2008, 2010, 2020)
- Last updated on 2 February 2026.

Croatia men's national handball team
Medal record

Olympic Games
Gold medal – first place	1996 Atlanta	Team
Gold medal – first place	2004 Athens	Team
Bronze medal – third place	2012 London	Team

World Championship
Gold medal – first place	2003 Portugal	
Silver medal – second place	1995 Iceland	
Silver medal – second place	2005 Tunisia	
Silver medal – second place	2009 Croatia	
Silver medal – second place	2025 Croatia/Denmark/Norway	
Bronze medal – third place	2013 Spain	

European Championship
Silver medal – second place	2008 Norway	
Silver medal – second place	2010 Austria	
Silver medal – second place	2020 Sweden/Austria/Norway	
Bronze medal – third place	1994 Portugal	
Bronze medal – third place	2012 Serbia	
Bronze medal – third place	2016 Poland	
Bronze medal – third place	2026 Denmark/Norway/Sweden	

Mediterranean Games
Gold medal – first place	1993 Languedoc-Rousillon	
Gold medal – first place	1997 Bari	Team
Gold medal – first place	2001 Tunis	Team
Gold medal – first place	2018 Tarragona	Team
Silver medal – second place	2005 Almería	Team
Silver medal – second place	2013 Mersin	Team

The Croatia national handball team (Croatian: Hrvatska rukometna reprezentacija) represents Croatia at international handball competitions and is governed by the Croatian Handball Federation (HRS). They're considered one of the best and most consistent national teams in history of handball. Since their Independence in 1991 Croatia has won 16 medals at main international competitions, the biggest being winning the gold medal at the Olympic Games twice and one World Championship title, and played in the final of the European Championship three times. The Croatian national team's victory at the 1996 Olympics is often credited as one of the biggest upsets in the history of handball. The Croatian national team have also won a so-called "international double", winning the gold medal at the World Championship (2003) and the Olympics (2004).

== History of handball in Croatia and Yugoslavia (1904–1991) ==
=== Handball in Austria-Hungary (1904–1918) ===
The word handball in the Croatian region was first used by Franjo Bučar in 1904 to describe the German game Schleuderball in the journal Sokol. The earliest documented forms of playing handball in these areas appear in 1911 at the gymnasium of Pazin, which is, among other things, due to the programs for education in Istria, as part of the then-Austrian coast, coming from the education center in Graz. At the time, handball was included in high school programs closing ceremony in Croatia. The type of handball was a form of Czech handball and was adopted by the Osijek and Vukovar students from Prague.

=== Between the two world wars (1918–1941) ===
In the early beginnings of Croatian handball, venues played both field handball and handball. Students were mostly attracted to field handball as it was played on existing football fields, while handball was played on makeshift courts. During the Kingdom of Yugoslavia, the first public handball match in the Croatian region and the wider neighborhood was played at a high school in Varaždin on 29 May 1930 under the guidance of physical education teacher Zvonimir Šuligoj. Since that game and until 1950, field handball was played exclusively in public in Croatia and Yugoslavia on football fields with eleven players on each side. The first handball courts in Yugoslavia was opened at a high school in Zagreb on 1 June 1935.

=== The establishment of Croatian Handball Federation and the first Croatian national team (1941–1945) ===
At the beginning of World War II, the Kingdom of Yugoslavia disintegrated. Most of the territory inhabited by Croats became part of the newly formed Independent State of Croatia (NDH) on 10 April 1941. As part of the new state, the Croatian Handball Federation (HRS) was established for the first time in history on 2 October 1941 in Zagreb. The place of foundation is recorded to be at the Croatian Sports home in Jurišićeva, Zagreb. HRS is the umbrella organization of handball in the ISC coordinated the work of a dozen clubs and until 1944 organized national championships. The first Croatian handball team was established shortly after the formation of the NDH, with the first practice-match training held on 12 October 1941 under the guidance of head coach Dragutin Pehe. The team's first and only international match was played on 14 June 1942 against Hungary in Budapest, where they lost 0:9. The field handball match was played in front of 30,000 spectators at the then-NEP Stadium (since 2002 Ferenc Puskás Stadium) and was a prelude to the meeting of the Croatian and Hungarian football teams. Under the direction of the coach Ante Škrtić, the players for Croatia were Vlado Abramović, Irislav Dolenec, Žarko Galetović, Zvonko Leskovar, Todor Marinov, Viktor Medved, Krešo Pavlin, Vlado Šimanović, Stjepan Širić, Josip Žitnik, goalkeeper Branko Kraljand, who was considered the best Croatian player on the field, and reserve goalkeeper Zdenko Šurina. HRS stopped functioning in 1944 due to the world war.

=== Handball in SFR Yugoslavia (1945–1991) ===
Following the end of World War II in 1945, the territory of the Independent State of Croatia was included in the newly established SFR Yugoslavia and work immediately began on rebuilding the handball sport in Yugoslavia. That same year, the Committee for handball Gymnastics Association Croatian was founded, while the Committee for handball Gymnastics Association of Yugoslavia was established in May 1948. HRS was restored on 19 December 1948, in which, in accordance with the national policy of the new Yugoslav state, the name was changed to the Croatian Handball Association (RSH). Handball Federation of Yugoslavia (RSJ) was established on 17 December 1949 in Belgrade by pooling national and provincial associations, and it became a member of the International Handball Federation (IHF) in 1950.

After the end of World War II, most field handball players of the NDH completed courses and became instructors or referees in handball. Some became members of the field handball national team of Yugoslavia and played in its first international match, played on 19 June 1950 at the stadium in Stadion Kranjčevićeva in Zagreb, against Belgium. Yugoslavia won 18:3 playing with nine players from Zagreb, one from Split and one from Sarajevo.

Since the end of World War II and until the breakup of Yugoslavia in 1991, the best Croatian handball players in field and team handball were selected to play for the national team of Yugoslavia. As part of the national team, Croatian players competed at 17 major competitions and won seven medals, including two Olympic gold medals and one World Championship gold medal. During this period, the team also won five gold medals in five appearances at the Mediterranean Games (1967, 1975, 1979, 1983 and 1991), two gold and one bronze medal at the World Cups held in 1971, 1974 and 1984 in Sweden, two bronze medals at the handball Super League held in 1981 and 1983 in Germany, and a silver medal at the 1990 Goodwill Games in Seattle.

At the World Junior Championship in 1987 in Rijeka, a nucleus generation of players that would define the 1990s for the Croatian national team came to light. Alvaro Načinović, Iztok Puc, Vladimir Jelčić and others were instrumental in helping Yugoslavia win the championship, and their talent and knowledge were later incorporated as seniors in the Croatian national team's first success after independence of the country.

Place	Croatians in the team of Yugoslavia	Croatian head coaches
10th place at WC 1952	Irislav Dolenec (player)	Ivan Snoj / Irislav Dolenec
5th place at WC 1955.	Irislav Dolenec (player), Stjepan Korbar	Ivan Snoj / Irislav Dolenec
8th place at WC 1958	Jerolim Karadža, Lovro Manestar, Božidar Peter, Zlatko Šimenc?, Ivan Špoljarić	Ivan Snoj
9th place at SP 1961.	Anton Bašić, Ivan Đuranec, Zvonko Jandroković, Jerolim Karadža, Božidar Peter, Zlatko Šimenc?	Ivan Snoj
6th place at WC 1964	Vojislav Bjegović, Vinko Dekaris, Ivan Đuranec, Lujo Györy, Jerolim Karadža, Zvonko Kocijan, Josip Milković, Vladimir Vićan, Albin Vidović, Zlatko Žagmešter	Ivan Snoj
7th place at WC 1967	Vinko Dekaris, Ivan Đuranec, Hrvoje Horvat, Jerolim Karadža, Branko Klišanin, Josip Milković, Miroslav Pribanić, Dobrivoje Selec, Ninoslav Tomašić, Ivan Uremović, Vladimir Vićan	Ivan Snoj / Irislav Dolenec
Gold medal at MG 1967	Hrvoje Horvat, Miroslav Klišanin, Josip Milković, Ivan Uremović, Albin Vidović	Ivan Snoj / Vlado Štencl
Bronze medal at WC 1970	Hrvoje Horvat, Marijan Jakšeković, Dragutin Mervar, Josip Milković, Miroslav Pribanić, Zlatko Žagmešter	Ivan Snoj / Vlado Štencl
Gold medal at WC 1971		Ivan Snoj
Gold medal at OG 1972	Hrvoje Horvat, Zdravko Miljak, Miroslav Pribanić, Dobrivoje Selec, Albin Vidović, Zdenko Zorko	Ivan Snoj / Vlado Štencl
Bronze medal at WC 1974	Hrvoje Horvat, Zdravko Miljak, Željko Nimš, Zvonimir Serdarušić, Zdenko Zorko	Ivan Snoj / Josip Milković
Gold medal at WC 1974		Ivan Snoj
Gold medal at MG 1975	Zdravko Miljak, Željko Nimš, Miroslav Pribanić, Zvonimir Serdarušić, Zdenko Zorko	Ivan Snoj
5th place at OG 1976	Hrvoje Horvat, Zdravko Miljak, Željko Nimš, Zvonimir Serdarušić, Zdenko Zorko	Ivan Snoj / Pero Janjić
5th place at WC 1978	Hrvoje Horvat, Zdravko Miljak, Željko Nimš, Zvonimir Serdarušić, Željko Vidaković, Zdenko Zorko	Ivan Snoj / Zdravko Malić
Gold medal at MG 1979	Pavle Jurina, Željko Vidaković, Zdravko Zovko, Željko Zovko	
6th place OG 1980	Pavle Jurina, Stjepan Obran	
Bronze medal SC 1981		
Silver medal at WC 1982	Mirko Bašić, Pavle Jurina, Stjepan Obran, Zdravko Zovko	
Bronze medal SC 1983		
Gold medal at MG 1983	Mirko Bašić, Pavle Jurina, Stjepan Obran, Željko Vidaković, Zdravko Zovko	
Bronze medal at SC 1984		
Gold medal at OG 1984	Mirko Bašić, Pavle Jurina, Zdravko Zovko	
Gold medal at WC 1986	Mirko Bašić, Zlatko Saračević	
Bronze medal at OG 1988	Mirko Bašić, Boris Jarak, Alvaro Načinović, Goran Perkovac, Iztok Puc, Zlatko Saračević, Irfan Smajlagić	
4th place at WC 1990	Mirko Bašić, Nenad Kljaić, Iztok Puc, Zlatko Saračević, Irfan Smajlagić, Ratko Tomljanović	
Silver medal at GG 1990	Patrik Ćavar, Bruno Gudelj, Nenad Kljaić	
Gold medal at MG 1991	Tomislav Farkaš, Valter Matošević	

== Modern Croatia national handball team (1991–present) ==
=== Official formation and first competitions (1991–1996) ===
On 30 May 1990, Croatia began the process of creating the independent state, and soon established the modern Croatian handball team. The first international match of the Croatian handball team was played on 14 January 1991 in Zagreb, in Kutija Šibica. It was a friendly match with Japan which ended in a draw 23:23. The team was coached by Josip Milković with assistant coach Lino Červar and the players were Patrik Čavar, Tonči Peribonio, Vlado Šola, Ivica Obrvan, Nenad Kljaić, Iztok Puc, Ratko Tomljanović, Bruno Gudelj, Željko Zovko, Stjepan Obran, Tomislav Farkaš, Robert Ipša, Ivo Glavinić and Goran Stojanović. The dissolution of Yugoslavia that followed, Croatia gained full independence on 8 October 1991 the Croatian Handball Association (RSH) in 1992 restored the original name of the Croatian Handball Federation (HRS), and on 10 April 1992 became a member of the International Handball Federation (IHF), and 23 July 1992 members of the European Handball Federation (EHF).

Taking fourth place at the 1990 World Championship in Czechoslovakia the Yugoslav national team was placed among the nine best teams of the tournament, which acquired them the right to participate in the upcoming 1992 Olympic Games in Barcelona. Because of the war and the disintegration of Yugoslavia, this team was disqualified, and should it was supposed to be specified who will replaced them in the games. Since the Croatian Olympic Committee (COC) was provisionally recognized on 17 January 1992 by the International Olympic Committee (IOC), and since Croatia had already on 22 May 1992 become a member of the United Nations, Croatian handball players had conditions to perform at the Olympic Games in 1992. This unfortunately did not happen. Although Croatia in terms of game was handball superpower, it was decided that Yugoslavia would be replaced by Iceland at the games as they finished tenth at the 1990 World Championship. Adverse effects of certain officials in the IOC prevented even the option of maintaining an additional qualifying tournament like the one held for the Croatian basketball players. Croatia also missed the 1993 World Championship in Sweden, because the World Championship in 1990 was an elimination tournament for this championship.

The following years, in spite of the short history of the country brought the Croatian team very significant results in important competitions. Croatia won its first official competition at the Mediterranean Games in 1993 in Languedoc-Roussillon, France, Croatia won gold. At the first ever European Championship in 1994 held in Portugal the team was led by Zdravko Zovko they won their first medal at this first major international competition. The group stage ended with Croatia finishing behind then powerful Russians, but in front of the French, led by the famous Jackson Richardson. In the semi-finals, the Swedes were better and Croatia played the third place match and won in a dramatic match against Denmark. Sweden won the tournament demolishing the Russians in the final with 13 points. A year later at the 1995 World Championships in Iceland Croatia relatively went easily from group stage to the quarter final where there was brought a rarely seen drama. Tunisia was defeated after penalty shootout. Then the team beat Egypt in the quarter finals and Sweden men's national handball team in the semi-finals. In the final they the French were too big an obstacle for Zovko guys won their first Croatian World Championship silver medal. Sweden won the bronze defeating Germany. The next year at the European Championship in 1996 in Spain, Croatia, was led by Abas Arslanagić. Croatia lost took fifth place with victory over the Czech Republic where the match was led by Vladimir Nekić because Arslanagić quit after Croatia failed to enter the semi-finals. The championship was won by Russia.

- Bronze medal at European Championship 1994 in Portugal
- Silver medal at World Championship 1995 in Iceland
- Fifth place at European Championship 1996 in Spain

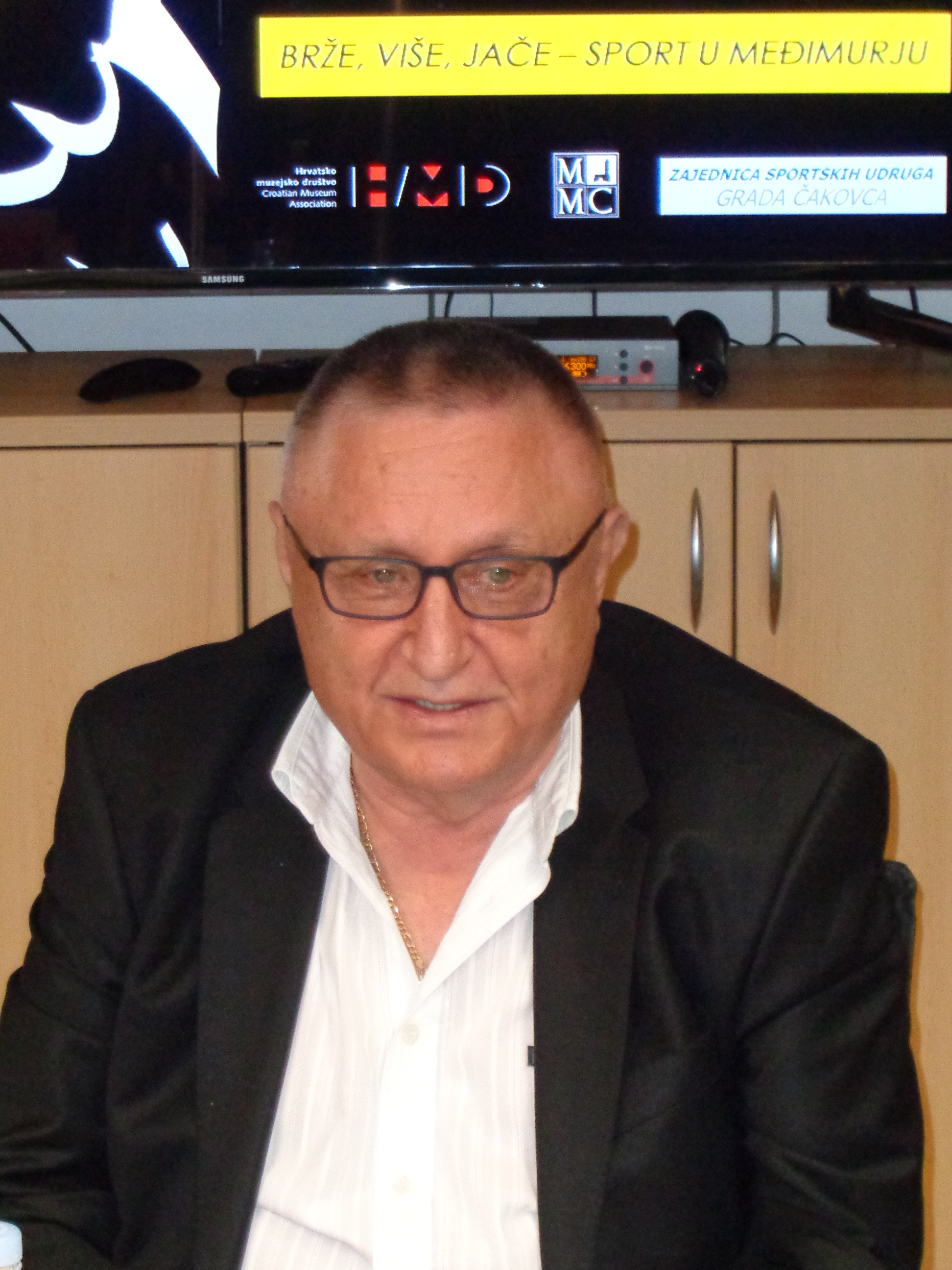
Željko Kavran, the Chairman of the Croatian Handball Federation 1995–2008.

=== Gold medal at the 1996 Summer Olympics ===
On the second Olympics in which Croatian athletes performed under the banner of the Croatian flag and won their first gold medal. This was won by the athletes who were least expected to win it, handball players. They were sent off to Atlanta without hope, because at the European Championship in 1996 they had finished in a weak fifth place, and relations in the national team were bad. Coach Abas Arslanagić quit during the end of the European championship and the national handball selection was filled with confrontation and fights. 38 days before the Olympic Games, the team was taken over by coach Velimir Kljaić, whose statement: "Will go back swimming if we don't win a medal" no one took seriously.

Before the Olympics there were still problems. Preliminary matches didn't offer much optimism. A few days before the start of the handball tournament a friendly encounter with Algeria was not played to the end. The Croatian players left the court because the Algerians went too far with their abusive playing and hurt three players, Goran Perkovac, Slavko Goluža and Nenad Kljaić.

The opening match of the Olympic games against Switzerland was tough. A victory was achieved in an already lost match. The Swiss led by as much as 6 goals, but then the goal was kept safe with a superb save from Venio Losert who just during the Olympic Games celebrated his 20th birthday. Making it a minimal victory, scoring in the 55th second before the end of the match, Patrik Ćavar brought a stellar victory.

The next two matches against Kuwait and hosts United States were easy victories. This was followed by the decisive encounter to enter the semi-finals, where there were only the two first-placed teams from each group.

The match with the then current Olympic and European champions Russia had a shocking finale. The Russians were leading by four points, but the Croats were arriving. The last minute was not for the faint of heart, but from the Russian roulette though the Croats came out as winners. One her of this triumph for the semi-finals was Valter Matošević. 40 seconds before the end of the match, when the result was 24:24, he defended a penalty shot from Torgovanov. Another hero was Božidar Jović, who just 3 seconds before the siren rang scored the winning goal.

The last match in the group was with the Swedes. This was the one in which yoneou could choose an opponent in the semi-finals, but Kljun omitted Patrik Ćavar, Iztok Puc, Zlatko Saračević and Irfan Smajlagić from the match. Croatia was defeated with nine goals difference, but without their poker aces there wasn't much to expect. The defeat did not have larger significance, except that it took to save face. In the semi-finals they waited for the French who were World Champions. Croatian handball showed the best possible way to respond to defeat in the final of the 1995 World Championship in Iceland. Engaged and disciplined, Croatian players did a great job and ensured the silver medal the same brightness as did the water polo team.

In the grand finale again Croatia faced the Swedes. In the semi-finals they defeated Spain, who later won the bronze medal. It was a great generation that only needed an Olympic gold medal to complete their collection. They probably hoped that Croatia was not with those who were missing against Sweden would not much raise the quality that they could be threatened. In the end their plans were foiled, and the Vikings failed to win. After starting 0: 1 followed by a brilliant game from the players Kljaić chose and the series of 6:1. The defense was solid and impenetrable and the attack varied and deadly. Perkovac great led his boys and Božidar Jović was the revelation of the tournament. Worried only in the final Zlatko Saračević was not playing properly, but Kljaić brought the perfect replacement, Zoran Mikulić. Although the Croatians twice led with seven goals difference, the second half offered drama. Swedes switched to defense 4–2 which created big problems. Decreased the difference and 6:30 minutes before the end came at just hit behind. Croatian handball players still in those crucial minutes they had never trembled hands.

Thirty seconds before the end of the line, player Nenad Kljaić scored a goal for the final 27:26 and became victorious. Sirens created celebration and parquet at Georgia Dome in front of 25,000 visitors in the hall and millions of TV viewers, which is today known caterpillar gold handball. The handball players were not yet aware of this gold they had earned. President of the Croatian Olympic Committee, Antun Vrdoljak, who had previously predicted 6 Atlanta medal and otherwise announced "As running from the day he was born" at Zagreb's main square. The handball players returned from Atlanta to thousands of fans greeting them at the airport and on Jelačić Square, where they did the caterpillar crawl.

Position	Players
Goalkeepers	Valter Matošević, Venio Losert
Back players	Zlatko Saračević, Goran Perkovac, Iztok Puc, Zoran Mikulić, Slavko Goluža, Bruno Gudelj, Valner Franković
Line players	Nenad Kljaić, Alvaro Načinović, Božidar Jović
Wing players	Irfan Smajlagić, Patrik Ćavar, Vladimir Šujster, Vladimir Jelčić
Coaching staff	Velimir Kljaić (Head coach), Milan Rončević (assistant and fitness coach), Zdenko Zorko (GK coach), Stanislav Peharec (Somatoped), Damir Suman (kinesiotherapists), Vladimir Nekić (tehniko), Josip Guberina (director)

=== A series of poor results (1996–2002) ===
After winning the Olympic gold medal on 4 August 1996 it was followed by a slow decline in the Croatian national team and the change of generations in which the handball players were far from winning a medal. It started when Croatia was knocked-out in the round of 16 of the World Championships. In Japan in 1997, Croatia was knocked out by Spain 31:25 and was ranked in 13th place. In Egypt 1999 they were knocked-out by Yugoslavia 30:23 leaving Croatia in 10th place. In France 2001 the national team would lose in the next round after two extra time (4 × 5 minutes) stopped Ukraine 37:34 (29: 29/33: 33) finishing in 9th place. At the European Championships in 1998, 2000 and 2002 finished in 8th, 6th and 16th place. Croatia in 2000 hosted the European Championship, they had high expectations from this tournament but they weren't fulfilled. After the defeat from Slovenia in the match for fifth place Croatia took only 6th place and failed to qualify for the 2000 Olympic Games in Sydney. The national team is also lost its ability to defend the gold from Atlanta in Sydney.

=== World Champions and Olympic Winners ===
Once the team reached bottom with their results, being ranked last or in 16th place at the 2002 European Championship, in March 2002 the Federation entrusted Lino Červar and with him the team that suffered a seven-year drought medal in two years was created into the world champions and Olympic winners. In the period between these two gold medals Croatia is still ranked 4th place at the European Championships in 2004 in Slovenia. With Červar in charge Croatia would be at the top of the handball world.

The arrival of Lino Červar was paired with existing team member, Ivano Balić. The national team got to the 2003 World Championship. The start of the competition was disastrous. Croatia lost in their first match to Argentina. Although the first half led with 5 goals, but 14 minutes before the end of the match conceded 6 goals. At the end of the match, Croatian handball players fired five successive attacks, and Mirza Džomba 20 seconds before the end missed the equalizer. Croatian players missed 6 penalty shots. During halftime of the second match against another labeled "underdog" of Saudi Arabia, Croatia was losing. The turning point was dramatic – the group's victories in the end against giants Russia, France and Hungary secured them first place to the second part where the Croats were convincing against Egypt and Denmark. In semi-finals the match went into overtime (4 × 5 minutes) defeating the Spaniards 39:37 (26: 26/31: 31) and in the grand final they outscored Germany 34:31 and won their first title of world champions and wrote surely one of the most beautiful story's in the history of Croatian sport.

Position	Players
Goalkeepers	Vlado Šola, Valter Matošević, Mario Kelentrić
Back players	Petar Metličić, Ivano Balić, Blaženko Lacković, Slavko Goluža, Tonči Valčić
Line players	Božidar Jović, Renato Sulić, Igor Vori
Wing players	Mirza Džomba, Nikša Kaleb, Vedran Zrnić, Goran Šprem
Defensive players	Denis Špoljarić, Davor Dominiković
Coaching staff	Lino Červar (Head coach), Irfan Smajlagić (Assistant coach), Mirko Bašić (GK coach), Josip Feldbauer (Doctor), Milorad Sakradžija (Fizioterapist), Antun Arić (Fizioterapist), Ivica Udovičić (tehniko), Ratko Balenović (Director)

In January 2004 Croatia played at the 2004 European Championship in Slovenia. They got to the semi-finals where they were knocked out by the hosts 25:27. They finished in fourth place losing the third place match to Denmark 27:31.

In Summer 2004 the Olympics were held in Athens. The national team continued its dominating play and were undefeated in all eight matches played. They defeated Iceland, Slovenia, South Korea, Russia, Spain, Greece and Hungary before getting to the final. In a dramatic final Croatia defeated Germany 26–24 and with the title of world champions they won the Olympic gold. In the last 5 minutes of the match went a goal ahead for Croatia, and then Nikša Kaleb who had not scored no goal with 3 consecutive goals sealed a great victory. The gold was an even greater success considering the fact that Croatia traveled to Athens without their best line player Renato Sulić who was recovering from a car accident, without important defense player Tonči Valčić and without Patrik Ćavar who was ill.

Position	Players
Goalkeepers	Vlado Šola, Venio Losert, Valter Matošević
Back players	Petar Metličić, Ivano Balić, Blaženko Lacković, Slavko Goluža, Drago Vuković
Line players	Igor Vori
Wing players	Mirza Džomba, Nikša Kaleb, Vedran Zrnić, Goran Šprem
Defensive players	Denis Špoljarić, Davor Dominiković
Coaching staff	Lino Červar (Head coach), Irfan Smajlagić (Assistant coach), Zdenko Zorko (GK coach), Miljenko Rak (Fitness coach), Milorad Sakradžija (Fizioterapist), Josip Feldbauer (Doctor), Stanislav Peharec (Somatoped), Davor Urek (Tehniko), Ivica Udovičić (Director)

=== Continuation of the Červar Era (2005–2010) ===
After excellent results at the 2003 World Championship and the 2004 Olympics, Croatia was considered one of the candidates for the title at the 2005 World Championship in Tunisia. As in previous years, the team once again showed its quality and reached the semi-finals with little difficulty. An excellent semi-final performance against traditional customers France earned Croatia a place in the final and a duel against the then very strong Spain. Although an uncertain match was expected, Spain surprisingly easily and convincingly won the title, scoring as many as 40 goals against Croatia. The final 6 difference hides the fact that the Spanish had a lead of as much as +13 with fourteen minutes to go.

At the 2006 European Championship in Switzerland, the Croatian national team again reached the semi-finals. Unfortunately, they were denied a place in the final by the new great generation of French handball, for whom this was their first major competition. In the match for the bronze medal, the Danish team was more motivated than Croatia, leaving Croatia without a medal.

At the 2007 World Championship in Germany, the Croatian handball team won their first seven games, and then another great French team was defeated in the quarterfinals. In an uncertain match with few goals, the quality of the French defense was decisive. After that, Croatia defeated Spain and Russia in the playoff for 5th to 8th place, and with nine wins and one loss, won 5th place. Many journalists and handball players emphasized that Croatia played the best and most attractive handball of all the participating teams. In the semifinals, the French fell into the German home court trap and lost 32:31 in a difficult match after extra time, although they were the better team. Demoralized and disappointed, the French did not have the strength for another bronze medal, and were defeated by the Danes. The French are particularly angry at this defeat due to the officiating, which was clearly on the side of the German hosts and which caused Michaël Guigou's goal 30 seconds before the end of the game to be disallowed, preventing the French from getting back into the game. Germany won the championship by defeating Poland.

A year later, at the 2008 European Championship in Norway, Croatia played the hosts in the last round of the second group stage. It was a match that directly decided which of the two teams would advance to the semi-finals. In a tough and difficult match, the Croats somehow managed to pull off the necessary draw and advance. The team reached the final against Denmark by defeating the strong France in a dramatic semi-final with a goal difference. Denmark had one of its best teams ever at this championship. In the second group stage of the same championship, they inflicted a shocking defeat on Croatia with a 10-goal advantage, so they were also the favorite in the final. The Croats surprisingly took a 4-0 lead at the start of the final match, but they were still unable to maintain the same rhythm for 60 minutes against a better opponent, and in the end they lost by 4 goals.

At the 2008 Olympic Games in Beijing, Croatia defeated Denmark in the quarterfinals, but lost again to the better-performing France in the semifinals. In the third-place match, a more motivated Spain left Croatia without a medal.

At the 2009 World Championship held in Croatia, the national team had nine consecutive victories leading up to the final. In the last match of the second round of the group stage, when the semi-finalists were already known, Croatia defeated France 22:19. The French played with a reserve team in that match and saved their energy for the final of the championship. The Croats also did not play with full commitment, although they were motivated to win that match in front of their home crowd. After Croatia's victory over Poland in the semi-finals, France was once again the dangerous team in the final. Although Croatia was a slight favorite due to its home field and the full Zagreb Arena, the French ran out with the best lineup and did not show that they did not have the status of favorites. Croatia had a 12:11 advantage at half-time, but in the second half the French showed their strength and took the lead after an uncertain 15 minutes. The French defense was so well-positioned that at one point the Croatian players played for more than 10 minutes without scoring a goal. They often failed to get a quality shot on goal, and even when they did, it was usually saved without major problems by goalkeeper Thierry Omeyer. The French increased their lead through counterattacks, which were mainly carried out by the fast wings Luc Abalo and Michaël Guigou. The final score was 24:19 for France.

At the 2010 European Championship in Austria, Croatia won the silver medal. The final between France and Croatia was another rematch of the duel between the two best handball teams. Croatia reached the final with a semi-final victory over Poland. The course of the game in the final was the same as in the 2009 World Championship final. In the first half, Croatia slightly dominated while the french played solidly and slowly. Croatia had a 2-point lead towards the end of the half, but two quick goals by Nikola Karabatić brought the French back into the game. Thus, the half ended in a draw. The same story was told in the second half. The French continued their solid play, and with excellent defense, goalkeeper Omeyer's saves and quick counterattacks by Abalo and Guigou, they quickly took the lead. The final score was 25:21 for the French, and they added their third major international gold medal in a row to their collection. By winning this gold, the French became the first handball team in the history of sports to be simultaneously world, European and Olympic champions. Shortly after the tournament ended Lino Červar gave his resignation and left the team after long 8 years.

=== Goluža era (2010–2015) ===
After the departure of the trophy-winning coach Lino Červar, Slavko Goluža took over the Croatian handball team in 2010 and at his first major competition, the 2011 World Championship in Sweden, he won 5th place. The national team showed its worst performance since the 2002 European Championship and for the first time since 2002, it was not among the top 3 teams in the world in terms of quality of play. Defeats against the then very strong Denmark and the host Sweden, and a draw with Serbia, left Croatia without a semi-final. Croatia remained third in its group in the second phase, and Denmark qualified for the semi-finals as first in the group and Sweden as second. Croatia eventually defeated Iceland in the match for 5th place.

At the 2012 European Championship in Serbia, Croatia reached the semi-finals with less difficulty. In the semi-finals, Serbia defeated Croatia on the wings of the home crowd and with the help of great motivation, based not only on neighborhood and sporting, but also historical and political reasons. In the bronze medal match, Croatia defeated the Spaniards.

At the 2012 London Olympics, Croatia easily and convincingly defeated all 5 opponents in the group with an average of 8.2 goals per game. South Korea was defeated by 10 goals, Serbia by 8, Hungary by 7, Denmark by 11, and Spain by 5. Croatia played brilliantly in the group matches. They finished their attacks with quality, had many quick counterattacks and an excellent 5-1 defense with the attacking Mozart Ivano Balić in the role of a forward defender. In that group stage, Croatia played by far its best handball since independence and one of the best seen in the history of world representative handball. The 11-goal defeat that Croatia inflicted on great Denmark was characterized by the Danes as one of the heaviest defeats in their history. After those initial handball rhapsodies, Croatia was a big favorite for gold. However, Croatia unexpectedly struggled against the solid Tunisia in the quarter-finals, and even trailed by 1 point at half-time. The Tunisians played very rough. They constantly got into physical duels with the Croatians and hit them unsportsmanlike. Sometimes they even tried to push Croatian players off the field at the sidelines. Since the Tunisians could not maintain their fiercely aggressive pace from the first half for the entire 60 minutes, the Croatians improved their game, turned the score around at half-time and eventually won. In the semi-final match, France took a 3-0 lead against Croatia right from the start. Although Croatia had many more missed shots on goal than France, at half-time France's advantage was only 2 points. The French attack, as well as the defense, were much worse during the Olympic tournament, and throughout the entire semi-final match, than they were in the period from 2006 to 2011. France had a hard time creating scoring chances, so they shot much less on goal. On the other hand, they were unable to stop the Croats from creating more chances and half-chances. Despite this, the execution of Croatian attacks was extremely poor. The Croats, in relatively promising situations, had a large number of attempts either saved by French goalkeeper Thierry Omeyer or would have missed the entire goal. Croatia tried to catch up throughout the game, and on several occasions came within 2 goals of being behind and came close to equalizing. Technical errors at key moments and imprecision in shooting on goal ultimately prevented them from returning to the match. After Croatia missed its chances, France took a 5-point lead and calmly ended the game with a 25:22 victory. In the bronze medal match, Croatia defeated Hungary for the second time in the same tournament by a 7-point margin. France won the championship title by defeating the surprise of the tournament, Sweden, in the final. Having won 5 out of 6 major competitions in 5 years, including 2 Olympic titles, this French team officially became the greatest generation in the history of handball.

At the 2013 World Championship held in Spain, Croatia again won all five games in the group. In the further elimination stages, Croatia easily defeated weak Belarus in the round of 16, and in the quarter-finals, France avenged its defeat at the London Olympics by as much as 7 goals. In that match, Drago Vuković received a red card after about forty seconds, and Croatia had fewer available field players due to previous injuries. However, France, whose slight decline in quality despite winning Olympic gold was also felt at the previous 2 competitions, was again not at the highest level seen in 2011 and earlier at the championship in Spain. Fatigue due to the lack of available field players, and exhaustion from the efforts against the French, caused the Croatians to lose to Denmark in the semi-finals. In the bronze medal match, Croatia easily defeated the surprise of the championship, Slovenia.

At the 2014 European Championship in Denmark, Croatia reached the semi-finals without any major problems, where the hosts were waiting for them. The team played the first half of the semi-final excellently and went into the break with a 2-point lead. The Croatians played worse in the second half, however, with poor play with two players more and a series of unused attacks costing them the defeat. In the bronze medal match, Spain led Croatia for most of the match. Croatia had several chances to equalize towards the end, but inaccuracy in passing prevented them from doing so, and they ended up losing the medal.

At the 2015 World Championship Croatia has a relatively easy path to the quarter finals, they defeated Austria, Tunisia, Iran, North Macedonia and Bosnia and Herzegovina in the Group and then Brazil in the Round of 16, but then the unexpected happened, Croatia lost the quarter-final match against Poland and got kicked out of the tournament, they finished 6th and it was Croatia's worst performance at the international scene since 2002. Days after the tournament ended Slavko Goluža gave his resignation after 5 years of being the team's coach.

=== Babić era (2015–2017) ===
Following the Croatia's worst performance at the international scene since 2002, Goluža was sacked as the coach and replaced by his assistant Željko Babić. Babić had a difficult job ahead of 2016 European Championship. Croatia at the time hadn't won a medal in 3 years, last time being a bronze medal at the 2013 World Championship. With many older, more experienced players leaving the team due to retirement, the team needed youngsters to take over. With Marko Kopljar as the captain, 2013 World's best Handball player Domagoj Duvnjak and others like Ivan Čupić, Zlatko Horvat, Jakov Gojun, Mirko Alilović who had many years of experience co-leading the team in the previous years and many newbies such as Marko Mamić and Luka Cindrić, the future was seen with a lot of potential but also questions. The tournament for Croatia started out with a difficult win over Belarus, a surprising loss to Norway and an easy win over Iceland. In the main round Croatia stomped over Macedonia (34-24) but suffered a big loss against old rivals France (32-24). Croats were basically out of the tournament. The only way for Croatia to go through to the semifinals was if Norway wins the match against the World, European and Olympic Champions France and then Croatia would have to win against hosts Poland by 11 goals or 10 goals if Craotia scores 35 goals or more. It was seen as a mission impossible, but Norway offered them that possibility with a surprising win over France.

In the final match in the Main Round against Poland, Croatia was leading by 5 goals at half time (15-10), then Croatian blitzkrieg happened in the first 10 minutes of second half. Croatia conceded their first goal in the second half in 40th minute while scoring 8 and basically ending the possibility that Poland goes through (since they needed to lose less than 5 goals for the semis). Things were looking incredible, Poland made a small comeback with a 5-0 goal series (30-13 - 30-18), but in the end it didn't help. Croatia won the match with an incredible and historic 14 goal difference (37-23) when the magical number was 11. The match in Croatia was remembered as "Čudo iz Krakova" (Miracle from Krakow). Croatia kicked hosts Poland out of the tournament together with France, while Norway topped the group. Croatia lost the semifinal match for the third tournament in a row against Spain but secured a bronze medal against Norway which started a rivalry with the Norwegians in the years to come. Even though there was doubts about the new era of Croatian handball, the future was bright again.

Position	Players
Goalkeepers	Mirko Alilović, Ivan Stevanović
Back players	Domagoj Duvnjak, Marko Mamić, Marko Kopljar, Ivan Slišković, Luka Cindrić, Igor Karačić, Luka Šebetić
Line players	Ilija Brozović, Krešimir Kozina, Marino Marić, Jakov Gojun
Wing players	Manuel Štrlek, Antonio Kovačević, Ivan Čupić, Zlatko Horvat
Coaching staff	Željko Babić (Head coach), Petar Metličić (Assistant coach), Mario Tomljanović (Conditioning coach), Božo Šinković (Physiotherapists), Tomislav Madjerčić (Physiotherapist), Ivica Maraš (Technique)

Following the successful European Championship, next on the schedule was the Qualifications for the 2016 Olympics. In the qualifiers, Croatia qualified by losing to Denmark, winning against Bahrain and winning again against Norway, continuing their rivalry. Olympics started out poorly for Croatia, they lost the first game unexpectedly to Qatar, but won all the other matches including against Denmark and France to secure Top spot in the group. In the quarter-finals, Poland got revenge on Croatia (for the Euros defeat few months prior) by defeating them and removing the chance for Croatia to get a semi-final spot for the first time since 2000. Denmark won the tournament in the final against France. Few months after the unsuccessful Olympics, Croatia was preparing to play at the 2017 World Championship in France. Expectations were high and the team was ready for new challenges with a new Captain, Domagoj Duvnjak. In the Preliminary Round, Croatia only lost 1 out of 5 matches against Germany, while in the Round of 16 defeated Egypt and Spain in the Quarter-Finals. In the semi-finals they played Norway once again and this match solidified their big rivalry with the Norwegians. Croatia had a chance to win the game, it was 22-22 and 60 minutes of the match have passed but Croatia had a penalty for the win. Zlatko Horvat famously missed the penalty, the match went into extra time and Croatia lost another semi-final match. But the Croatians troubles were not over, because in the third-place match against Slovenia they had everything in their hands, leading by a big 5 points at half-time, but the big Slovenian turnaround happened and Croatia dramatically lost the bronze medal. Babić was fired a few days after the match due to the failure in the tournament.

=== Second Červar era (2017–2021) ===
Following the unsuccessful 2017 World Championship where Croatia finished 4th, Babić was fired from his position as the coach of the Croatian team and after 7 years Lino Červar was brought back shortly afterwards in march. Červar had a huge responsibility on his hands since the first tournament he would be leading Croatia to was the 2018 European Championship where Croatia were the hosts. For the tournament he brought back the pivot expert Igor Vori to the team after 3 years of being absent from the team following his semi-retirement due to injuries after the 2015 World Championship. The tournament started well for the Croats with 2 wins against Serbia and Iceland but also a loss in the cruical match against Sweden who would later become vice champions. In the Main Round they won matches against Belarus and Norway but lost against France and missed out their first European semi-final since 2002. They secured the fifth place in a match against Czech Republic. A year later the tournament started even more amazing with 5 straight wins, most notably against Spain but in the main round got defeated surprisingly by Brazil and then hosts Germany and were out of the tournament. They defeated France and secured the fifth place match (which they lost against Sweden) and qualification for the 2020 Olympics.

At the 2020 European Championship expectations were pretty low for the Croats since by then they haven't won a medal in any major competitions since 2016. Just like the previous year, the Croats defeated the first 5 teams in the first 5 matches, the last one being Germany after an amazing comeback where the Germans were ahead for the majority of the game, even winning (16-11) but Croatia's winning mentality made sure they would be the ones to walk out with two points. The win qualified them for the first semis in 3 years, kicking Germany out of the tournament and getting revenge for the year prior. Before the semis Croatia won one more match against Czech Republic and drew against Spain. In the semis they defeated Norway after extra time, got revenge for the 2017 World Championship semi-final defeat and reached their first European Final since 2010. In the final they lost against Spain (22-20), secured a silver medal and the Captain Domagoj Duvnjak was announced as the MVP of the tournament.

Position	Players
Goalkeepers	Marin Šego, Matej Ašanin
Back players	Domagoj Duvnjak, Marko Mamić, Josip Šarac, Matej Hrstić, Luka Cindrić, Igor Karačić, Luka Stepančić
Line players	Željko Musa, Marino Marić, Marin Šipić
Wing players	Zlatko Horvat, Vlado Matanović, David Mandić, Valentino Ravnić
Coaching staff	Lino Červar (Head coach), Hrvoje Horvat (Assistant coach), Miljenko Rak (Conditioning coach), Damir Kajba (Physiotherapists), Filip Šimunović (Physiotherapist), Zdravko Mirilović (Technique)

What followed at the 2021 World Championship is something nobody could've predicted. Completely opposite of the year prior, Croatia went into the tournament with the highest expectations, after all they were European vice-champions. Already in the first match they drew against Japan and it didn't look good. Two wins against Angola and Qatar secured them the Main Round where they defeated Bahrain, shockingly lost against Argentina and got humiliated by Denmark (38-26). They were not only out of the tournament and not only they finished 15th (their worst result in any international competition since 2002) but the coach Lino Červar announced his departure from the team right before the final match in the group against Denmark and left the team in shambles. Červar leaving, senior players retiring and young players being needed, he future was uncertain.

=== Second series of poor results (2021–2024) ===
After a debacle at the 2021 World Championship where Croatia finished 15th (their worst result at the international scene since 2002) Lino Červar stepped down as the coach and got replaced by his assistant coach Hrvoje Horvat Jr.. His first task was to qualify Croatia for the 2020 Olympics. Croatia played 3 matches against France, Portugal and Tunisia, won the matches against Portugal and Tunisia, lost against France and because of the goal difference Portugal went through and Croatia didn't. They failed to qualify for their second Olympics in history. After a failure of not qualifying for the Olympics, Croatia also failed to make a promising result at the 2022 European Championship (8th place) and the 2023 World Championsip (9th place). Hrvoje Horvat Jr. stepped down as the coach after only 2 years and got replaced by a former Croatian Handballer Goran Perkovac. At the 2024 European Championship where the tournament started out amazing with a historic (39-29) victory against Spain he also failed to make a good result, in fact it was Croatia's worst result at the European Championship since 2002. Soon after the tournament ended Croatian Handball Federation made a decision to part ways with Perkovac.

=== Sigurðsson era (2024– ) ===
Following a series of disappointing results at international scene at the European Championships (2022, 2024), the World Championships (2021, 2023) and the failure of not qualifying for the 2020 Olympics the change was needed. Croatian Handball Federation decided to bring in a more experienced coach, that ended up being Dagur Sigurðsson, the first foreign coach Croatian team ever had which stirred some discussion in the Croatian media.

Sigurðsson was brought in February 2024 and already had a difficult road ahead of him, he needed Croatia to qualify for the 2024 Olympics. On that road were 3 matches against Austria, Germany and Algeria in March 2024. He led them to three wins and qualified the team for their first Olympics since 2016. All looked good but at the actual event Croatia had their worst ever Olympics since their independence. They won only 2 out of 5 matches. Won matches against Japan and Germany, lost against Slovenia and received a humiliating loss against Sweden (38-27). They lost their final match against Spain and were kicked out of the tournament.

After a disappointing result at the Olympics, Sigurðsson was under even more pressure to prove he was the right man for the job notably since the next tournament was (partially) held at home, the 2025 World Men's Handball Championship. Croatia needed a good result especially in front of their own crowd. The tournament started out very well with two great wins against Bahrain and Argentina but the third match saw them lose a crucial match against Egypt (28-24). The loss saw it difficult for them to go through to the quarter-finals (but not impossible) since they would need to defeat all three of their opponents, one being Cape Verde, another being the contenders for the top spot in the group, Iceland and the final being a fourth best placed team at the Olympics, Slovenia. First game was an easy win against Cape Verde by 20 goals. Then what followed was an incredible comeback to the tournament. The match against Iceland was the first and crucial one for Croatia to advance to the quarterfinals of the World Championship. The Icelanders were clear favorites against the hosts due to the quality of the players playing for the better clubs in the Bundesliga, their fast, modern Scandinavian handball, and Iceland's victory over Croatia the year before at the 2024 European Championship. On paper it was one thing, but on the field it was completely the opposite. Croatia led 20-12 at halftime and ended the match 32-26. Dagur Sigurdsson, with his quality and knowledge of Icelandic handball, destroyed "His" Iceland with a classic Croatian 5-1 defense (which turned out to be the biggest win of the tournament). Leon Šušnja and David Mandić excelled with their defensive play, while Marko Mamić destroyed Aron Palmarsson (Iceland's main asset and playmaker) with his play, long arms, height, mobility and knowledge of playing as a unit in a 5-1 defense, something he tends to play in his club Leipzig. The match against Slovenia was next and it didn't look easy. Although the Slovenians were already out of the championship and had no chance of advancing, they still wanted to win and are big rivals to the Croatians, due to their neighborhood and political history. The Slovenians wanted to finish the tournament with a win and prevent the Croatians from advancing, while the Croatians were under great pressure because they needed a win. The match started disastrously, Slovenia led 0-5, and Croatia scored the first goal only in the 8th minute. The Croatians managed to come back from the nightmare because at halftime it was 15-15. They took the lead for the first time midway through the second half and eventually won 29-26 after a hard-fought battle. They saw themselves topping the group with 8 points, same as Egypt and Iceland but with a better goal difference. Croatia reached their first playoff match in any international competition in 5 years and the enthusiasm but also the confidence in this young team was slowly being brought back in Croatia, both in the Arena Zagreb but also in front of the screens at home.

The quarter-finals were one for the ages, a difficult match against Hungary was nearly lost, until a 55th minute when Croatia made a 5-0 series (31-30) and won the match with a last, second goal by Marin Šipić. The goal saw them reaching their first semi-finals at the World Championship since 2017. In the other quarter-final match France were sent to the semis in a similar way with a winning goal by Luka Karabatić being scored in the last 250 milliseconds of the match. The time was for another famous El Clasico between the old rivals France. In the semi-final game Croatia played their best game of the tournament and won in an incredible semi-final match (31-28) which saw them placed in the final of the tournament. Many handball experts and former players from the Balkans including Veselin Vujović were very outspoken on Croatia's play that resembled the defense Croatia was known in the 2000s during Červar's reign where Igor Vori played the role that Marko Mamić played against France. The games against Iceland and now France were two of the best games Croatia played in years. They lost in the final against Denmark (32-26) and won their first medal at the World Championship since 2013 and their first overall medal in 5 years since 2020. The tournament ended Domagoj Duvnjak's incredible 18 year international career and his role as the captain of the national team after 8 years, Igor Karačić and Ivan Pešić also retired respectfully. Mario Šoštarič was declared the best right wing of the tournament and Ivan Martinović the best right back, Martinović also became the captain following Duvnjak's retirement.

Position	Players
Goalkeepers	Dominik Kuzmanović, Ivan Pešić
Back players	Ivan Martinović, Mateo Maraš, Luka Lovre Klarica, Zvonimir Srna, Tin Lučin, Domagoj Duvnjak, Igor Karačić, Ivano Pavlović, Luka Cindrić
Line players	Marin Šipić, Josip Šimić, Veron Načinović
Wing players	Mario Šoštarić, Filip Glavaš, David Mandić, Marin Jelinić, Lovro Mihić
Defensive players	Leon Šušnja, Marko Mamić
Coaching staff	Dagur Sigurðsson (Head coach), Denis Špoljarić (Assistant coach), Valter Matošević (GK coach), Miljenko Rak (Conditioning coach), Danijel Brajković (Conditioning coach), Goran Krušelj (Physiotherapist), Zdravko Mirilović (Technique)

Before the tournament in January, the Croatians played two qualifying matches for the 2026 European Championship. They won against Luxembourg and Belgium, and after the aforementioned tournament they defeated Luxembourg and Belgium again in the return matches together with the Czech Republic in Brno and Zagreb. It was their best qualifications since 2012.

Before the tournament, due to injuries Croatia lost its main pivot Marin Šipić, and then Leon Ljevar, who was supposed to make his debut at a major tournament, along with four players returning from long injuries and other players who had not had much playing time for their clubs, expectations were quite low. At the very beginning of the tournament, Croatia achieved 2 victories, but very hard against Georgia and the Netherlands, and then suffered a heavy defeat against Sweden (35-27) (one of the hosts and one of the favorites for gold). In the main round, Croatia needed 4 wins out of 4 games to reach the semifinals, and that's what happened. First against Iceland, Switzerland, and then against neighbors Slovenia and the key match against Hungary (Hungary drew with Sweden and more or less eliminated them from the tournament). Croats lost to Germany (31-28) in the semifinals, then grabbed the bronze medal from Iceland (34-33) who were seeking revenge on the Croats. Croatia won its seventh medal at the European Championships and its second in a row after the 2025 World Championship. The last time that happened was when Slavko Goluža won 3 bronze medals in a row in early 2010s. By finishing in the Top 4 Croatia directly qualified for the 2027 World Championship.

Before the tournament, there were many question marks for this European Championship from the Croatian and foreign media, who assumed that the success at the 2025 World Championship was only due to the home field advantage and "luck" against Slovenia and especially Hungary in the quarterfinals of the championship. The most popular target of the Croatian national team during the competition was the Danish handball analyst Rasmus Boysen, who assumed that Croatia would be the biggest disappointment of the tournament because he did not think that the world vice-champions would reach the semifinals of the tournament. After winning the bronze medal, opinions changed on his part, as well as on the part of other media, who realized that after many years, Croatia managed to develop continuity on the world stage by winning two medals in two consecutive competitions.

Position	Players
Goalkeepers	Dominik Kuzmanović, Matej Mandić, Dino Slavić
Back players	Ivan Martinović, Mateo Maraš, Luka Lovre Klarica, Zvonimir Srna, Tin Lučin, Diano Neris Ćeško, Luka Cindrić, Ivano Pavlović
Line players	Zlatko Raužan, Josip Šimić, Veron Načinović
Wing players	Mario Šoštarić, Filip Glavaš, David Mandić, Marin Jelinić
Defensive players	Leon Šušnja, Marko Mamić
Coaching staff	Dagur Sigurðsson (Head coach), Denis Špoljarić (Assistant coach), Valter Matošević (GK coach), Ivica Maraš (Team Leader), Željko Kercel (Physiotherapist), Josip Režić (Physiotherapist), Saša Matejčić (Physiotherapist), Team Official Ivica Udovičić (Team Official)

== Rivalries ==
Croatia has developed several handball rivalries. Their most played rivalry is against France called "El Clasico", which is often considered to be one of the biggest modern handball rivalries since the end of the Cold War. Croatia has played 3 finals against France (1995, 2009, 2010), lost all 3 and 7 semifinals winning 4 (1996, 2005, 2008, 2025) and losing 3 (2006, 2008, 2012) and two quarter-finals winning once (2013) and losing once (2007). The most painful defeat against the French was in 2009, when the French took the world gold medal from them in the middle of Zagreb, and that's when the rivalry took on greater significance.

Their other rivalries include Spain, Denmark, Germany and neighbors Slovenia and Serbia. Against Spain they lost 2 finals (2005, 2020), played two semi-finals winning one (2003) and losing one (2016) and they played three matches for the bronze medal, winning one (2012) and losing two (2008, 2014). Against Denmark they also lost two finals (2008, 2025), and played three matches for the bronze medal winning once (1994) and losing twice (2004, 2006). Against Germany they won two gold medals by defeating them in the final (2003, 2004) and lost one semi-final match (2026). Against Slovenia they lost semi-final in 2004, bronze medal match (2017) and won a bronze medal match (2013). Against Serbia they lost the semi-finals in 2012 in Belgrade.

Another rivalry was with the Norwegians that peaked in the mid to late 2010s. At almost every major championship between 2015 and 2020 Croats played against them, including three important medal matches and one qualifying match for the 2016 Olympic Games. The first matches against the Norwegians were in the qualifying group for the 2016 European Championship. Croats lost the first match (27-26) and won the second (31-25). Both teams qualified for the championship. The first major game against the Norwegians was at the 2016 European Championship in the group stage, which the Norwegians surprisingly won (34-31), at the same championship in the more important match the Croats took revenge on them for the bronze medal (31-24). Interestingly enough Croats were on the verge of being knocked out of the championship due to losing to both Norway and later France and one more loss against Poland would've sent them home but Norway surprisingly defeated France and gave Croatia an option to defeat Poland by 11 goals to advance to the semifinals. That's exactly what ended up happening. Norway might've won the battle but Croatia won the war. Few months after the Euros, Croats defeated them again in the group stage of the 2016 Olympic Games qualifiers (27-21). Croatia qualified for the Olympics and Norway didn't. The most painful defeat against the Norwegians occurred in the semi-final match of the 2017 World Championship in France, in which Croats had a penalty to win, which Zlatko Horvat not score, and then the Norwegians won the game after extra time (28-25). A year later, at the 2018 European Championship on their home ground Croats inflicted another defeat on them in the Group Stage (32-28). The 2019 World Championship was the first championship and/or qualifiers since 2014 in which the two national teams did not play together. And finally, in the semi-final match of the 2020 European Championship, Croats took revenge for the semi-final defeat in 2017, in which they defeated them in a similar way after extra time (29-28). Croatia ended up losing the final and Norway picked up a bronze medal. That victory for the Croats closed an era of Croatian and Norwegian handball and the mini-rivalry that the two national teams had, because after that, the two teams have not played a match together at a major championship to this day. What followed in coming years was the slow decline of both national teams. As of 2026 after many years of below average results Croatia returned to form by winning medals consistently again but Norway never was able to recapture to the golden generation they once had, their best result being 5th place at 2022 European Men's Handball Championship. It's worth mentioning that Norway was (after Denmark and France were eliminated) the favourites to win the championship and Sander Sagosen was the best and highest scoring player at the tournament, if Croatia hadn't knocked them we would remember that tournament very differently today and Sagosen probably would've won the MVP award instead of Duvnjak.

== Results at international competitions ==
Prior to 1991, Croatia men's national handball team played as a part of Yugoslavia men's national handball team.

Croatia played its first match on 14 January 1991 in Zagreb. Team's first opponent was Japan and the match ended tied 23–23.

=== Overview of achievements at major international competitions ===
Year	Summer Olympics	World Championship	European Championship
1994			3rd place, bronze medalist(s)
1995		2nd place, silver medalist(s)
1996	1st place, gold medalist(s)		5th
1997		13th
1998			8th
1999		10th
2000	Did not qualify		6th
2001		9th
2002			16th
2003		1st place, gold medalist(s)
2004	1st place, gold medalist(s)		4th
2005		2nd place, silver medalist(s)
2006			4th
2007		5th
2008	4th		2nd place, silver medalist(s)
2009		2nd place, silver medalist(s)
2010			2nd place, silver medalist(s)
2011		5th
2012	3rd place, bronze medalist(s)		3rd place, bronze medalist(s)
2013		3rd place, bronze medalist(s)
2014			4th
2015		6th
2016	5th		3rd place, bronze medalist(s)
2017		4th
2018			5th
2019		6th
2020	Did not qualify		2nd place, silver medalist(s)
2021		15th
2022			8th
2023		9th
2024	9th		11th
2025		2nd place, silver medalist(s)
2026			3rd place, bronze medalist(s)

=== Medal count (major competitions) ===
Updated after 2026 European Handball Championship

Competition	1st place, gold medalist(s)	2nd place, silver medalist(s)	3rd place, bronze medalist(s)	Total
Olympic Games	2	0	1	3
World Championship	1	4	1	6
European Championship	0	3	4	7
Total	3	7	6	16

Champions Runners-up Third place Fourth place

=== Competitive record (major competitions) ===
Competition	Pld	W	D	L	GF	GA	GD
Olympic Games (6 times)	42	31	0	11	1191	1081	+110
World Championship (16 times)	123	89	6	28	3577	3065	+512
European Championship (16 times)	114	66	10	38	3077	2938	+139
Total	279	186	16	77	7845	7084	+761

=== Summer Olympics ===
==== Competitive record at the Summer Olympics ====
Year	Round	Position	Pld	W	D	L	GF	GA	GD
(Spain) 1992	Did not enter								
(United States) 1996	Final	1st place, gold medalist(s)	7	6	0	1	183	168	+15
(Australia) 2000	Did not qualify								
(Greece) 2004	Final	1st place, gold medalist(s)	8	8	0	0	238	211	+27
(China) 2008	Fourth place	4th	8	4	0	4	218	199	+19
(United Kingdom) 2012	Third place	3rd place, bronze medalist(s)	8	7	0	1	230	183	+47
(Brazil) 2016	Quarterfinal	5th	6	4	0	2	174	164	+10
(Japan) 2020	Did not qualify								
(France) 2024	Preliminary round	9th	5	2	0	3	148	156	−8
(United States) 2028	TBD								
(Australia) 2032	TBD								
Total	Qualified: 6/8		42	31	0	11	1191	1081	+110
Including qualifying rounds			57	44	0	13	1660	1451	+209

==== Competitive record in qualifying rounds ====
Year	Pld	W	D	L	GF	GA	GD	Qual
(Spain) 1992	Did not enter							N/A
(United States) 1996	2nd at the 1995 World Champ							yes
(Australia) 2000	10th at the 1999 World Champ							no
(Greece) 2004	1st at the 2003 World Champ							yes
(China) 2008	3	3	0	0	100	72	+28	yes
(United Kingdom) 2012	3	3	0	0	102	65	+37	yes
(Brazil) 2016	3	2	0	1	84	71	+13	yes
(Japan) 2020	3	2	0	1	81	81	0	no
(France) 2024	3	3	0	0	102	81	+21	yes
(United States) 2028	TBD							
(Australia) 2032	TBD							
Total	15	13	0	2	469	370	+99	4/5

=== World Championship ===
==== Competitive record at the World Championship ====
Year	Round	Position	Pld	W	D*	L	GF	GA	GD
(Sweden) 1993	Did not enter								
(Iceland) 1995	Final	2nd	9	6	1	2	246	211	+35
(Japan) 1997	Round of 16	13th	6	2	1	3	148	146	+2
(Egypt) 1999	Round of 16	10th	6	3	1	2	141	145	−4
(France) 2001	Round of 16	9th	6	3	1	2	188	152	+36
(Portugal) 2003	Final	1st	9	8	0	1	270	243	+27
(Tunisia) 2005	Final	2nd	10	8	0	2	316	273	+43
(Germany) 2007	Quarterfinal	5th	10	9	0	1	308	246	+62
(Croatia) 2009	Final	2nd	10	9	0	1	298	228	+70
(Sweden) 2011	Main Round	5th	9	6	1	2	271	213	+58
(Spain) 2013	Semi-final	3rd	9	8	0	1	266	202	+64
(Qatar) 2015	Quarterfinal	6th	9	7	0	2	258	224	+34
(France) 2017	Semi-final	4th	9	6	0	3	254	233	+21
(Denmark) (Germany) 2019	Main Round	6th	9	6	0	3	250	220	+30
(Egypt) 2021	Main Round	15th	6	3	1	2	156	152	+4
(Poland) (Sweden) 2023	Main Round	9th	6	4	1	1	207	167	+40
(Croatia) (Denmark) (Norway) 2025	Final	2nd	9	7	0	2	286	234	+52
(Germany) 2027	Qualified								
(France) (Germany) 2029	TBD								
(Denmark) (Iceland) (Norway) 2031	TBD								
Total	Qualified: 17/20		132	95	7	30	3863	3289	+574
Including qualifying rounds			144	106	6	32	4234	3447	+787

==== Competitive record in qualifying rounds ====
Year	Pld	W	D	L	GF	GA	GD	Qual
(Sweden) 1993	Did not enter							N/A
(Iceland) 1995	3rd at the 1994 Euro							yes
(Japan) 1997	5th at the 1996 Euro							yes
(Egypt) 1999	6	5	0	1	171	152	+19	yes
(France) 2001	6th at the 2000 Euro							yes
(Portugal) 2003	2	2	0	0	67	50	+17	yes
(Tunisia) 2005	defending champion							yes
(Germany) 2007	4th at the 2006 Euro							yes
(Croatia) 2009	Qualified as host							yes
(Sweden) 2011	2nd at the 2010 Euro							yes
(Spain) 2013	3rd at the 2012 Euro							yes
(Qatar) 2015	4th at the 2014 Euro							yes
(France) 2017	3rd at the 2016 Euro							yes
(Denmark) (Germany) 2019	2	1	0	1	63	51	+12	yes
(Egypt) 2021	2nd at the 2020 Euro							yes
(Poland) (Sweden) 2023	2	2	0	0	70	43	+27	yes
(Croatia) (Denmark) (Norway) 2025	Qualified as co-host							yes
(Germany) 2027	3rd at the 2026 Euro							yes
(France) (Germany) 2029
(Denmark) (Iceland) (Norway) 2031
Total	12	10	0	2	371	296	+75	4/4

=== European Championship ===
==== Competitive record at the European Championship ====
Year	Round	Position	Pld	W	D	L	GF	GA	GD
(Portugal) 1994	Semi-final	3rd place, bronze medalist(s)	7	4	0	3	165	161	+4
(Spain) 1996	Preliminary Round	5th	6	4	0	2	154	150	+4
(Italy) 1998	Preliminary Round	8th	6	2	1	3	145	150	−5
(Croatia) 2000	Preliminary Round	6th	6	3	1	2	146	139	+7
(Sweden) 2002	Preliminary Round	16th	3	0	0	3	70	89	−19
(Slovenia) 2004	Semi-final	4th	8	4	2	2	222	221	+1
(Switzerland) 2006	Semi-final	4th	8	5	0	3	229	228	+1
(Norway) 2008	Final	2nd place, silver medalist(s)	8	5	1	2	212	203	+9
(Austria) 2010	Final	2nd place, silver medalist(s)	8	6	1	1	207	194	+13
(Serbia) 2012	Semi-final	3rd place, bronze medalist(s)	8	5	1	2	216	201	+15
(Denmark) 2014	Semi-final	4th	8	5	0	3	229	206	+23
(Poland) 2016	Semi-final	3rd place, bronze medalist(s)	8	5	0	3	250	219	+31
(Croatia) 2018	Fifth place match	5th	7	5	0	2	204	187	+17
(Austria) (Norway) (Sweden) 2020	Final	2nd place, silver medalist(s)	9	7	1	1	227	205	+22
(Hungary) (Slovakia) 2022	Main Round	8th	7	3	1	3	185	181	+4
(Germany) 2024	Main Round	11th	7	3	1	3	216	204	+12
(Denmark) (Norway) (Sweden) 2026	Semi-final	3rd place, bronze medalist(s)	9	7	0	2	268	258	+10
(Portugal) (Spain) (Switzerland) 2028	TBD								
(Czech Republic) (Denmark) (Poland) 2030	TBD								
(France) (Germany) 2032	TBD								
Total	Qualified: 17/20		123	73	10	40	3345	3196	+149
Including qualifying rounds			170	112	13	45	4697	4242	+455

==== Competitive record in qualifying rounds ====
Year	Pld	W	D	L	GF	GA	GD	Qual
(Portugal) 1994	8	6	1	1	214	166	+48	yes
(Spain) 1996	6	5	0	1	161	137	+24	yes
(Italy) 1998	6	4	0	2	166	145	+21	yes
(Croatia) 2000	Qualified as host							yes
(Sweden) 2002	2	2	0	0	71	56	+15	yes
(Slovenia) 2004	2	1	1	0	62	52	+10	yes
(Switzerland) 2006	4th at the 2004 Euro							yes
(Norway) 2008	4th at the 2006 Euro							yes
(Austria) 2010	8	7	0	1	252	180	+72	yes
(Serbia) 2012	6	6	0	0	168	137	+31	yes
(Denmark) 2014	6	5	0	1	161	135	+26	yes
(Poland) 2016	6	5	0	1	191	148	+43	yes
(Croatia) 2018	Qualified as host							yes
(Austria) (Norway) (Sweden) 2020	6	5	1	0	174	148	+26	yes
(Hungary) (Slovakia) 2022	2nd at the 2020 Euro							yes
(Germany) 2024	6	4	1	1	180	164	+16	yes
(Denmark) (Norway) (Sweden) 2026	6	6	0	0	200	139	+61	yes
(Portugal) (Spain) (Switzerland) 2028	TBD							
(Czech Republic) (Denmark) (Poland) 2030	TBD							
(France) (Germany) 2032	TBD							
Total	68	56	4	8	2000	1607	+393	17/17

=== Mediterranean Games ===
Year	Round	Position	Pld	W	D	L	GF	GA	GD
(France) 1993	Final	1st place, gold medalist(s)	6	6	0	0	160	117	+43
(Italy) 1997	Final	1st place, gold medalist(s)	5	4	0	1	121	115	+6
(Tunisia) 2001	Final	1st place, gold medalist(s)	5	5	0	0	149	127	+22
(Spain) 2005	Final	2nd place, silver medalist(s)	4	3	0	1	107	103	+4
(Italy) 2009	Did not participate								
(Turkey) 2013	Final	2nd place, silver medalist(s)	6	4	0	2	166	158	+8
(Spain) 2018	Final	1st place, gold medalist(s)	5	5	0	0	139	120	+19
(Algeria) 2022	Did not participate								
(Italy) 2026	Did not participate								
(Kosovo) 2030	TBD								
Total	Qualified: 6/8		25	21	0	4	682	623	+59

== Team ==
=== Current squad ===
Roster for the 2028 European Men's Handball Championship Qualifiers against Finland and Lithuania in November 2026

Head coach: Dagur Sigurðsson

No.	Pos.	Name	Date of birth (age)	Height	App.	Goals	Club
1	GK	Dominik Kuzmanović	15 August 2002 (age 24)	1.93 m	45	4	(Germany) SC Magdeburg
13	CB	Ivano Pavlović	19 March 2003 (age 23)	1.90 m	14	20	(Croatia) RK Zagreb
12	GK	Matej Mandić	2 May 2002 (age 24)	2.04 m	37	2	(Germany) SC Magdeburg
36	GK	Matija Špikić	3 April 1996 (age 30)	1.87 m	21	0	(Germany) ThSV Eisanach
19	CB	Matko Moslavac	15 February 2007 (age 19)	1.91 m	1	1	(Croatia) RK Nexe Našice
39	LW	David Mandić	14 September 1997 (age 29)	1.87 m	64	149	(Germany) MT Melsungen
62	LW	Marin Jelinić	7 December 1996 (age 29)	1.94 m	58	153	(Hungary) SC Pick Szeged
6	RW	Mario Šoštarić	25 November 1992 (age 33)	1.93 m	47	185	(Hungary) SC Pick Szeged
93	P	Veron Načinović	7 March 2000 (age 26)	2.04 m	48	98	(Germany) THW Kiel
53	P	Marin Šipić	29 April 1996 (age 30)	1.90 m	77	143	(Switzerland) HC Kriens-Luzern
30	LB	Marko Mamić	6 March 1994 (age 32)	2.02 m	106	123	(Croatia) RK Zagreb
11	LB	Zvonimir Srna	18 January 1998 (age 28)	2.02 m	50	122	(France) Montpellier Handball
41	LB	Tin Lučin	16 August 1999 (age 27)	1.96 m	55	143	(Croatia) RK Nexe Našice
15	LB	Leon Ljevar	12 February 2001 (age 25)	1.98 m	4	16	(North Macedonia) RK Vardar
51	RB	Ivan Martinović	6 January 1998 (age 28)	1.94 m	66	308	(Hungary) Veszprém KC
20	RB	Mateo Maraš	17 December 2000 (age 25)	2.03 m	47	84	(France) Paris Saint-Germain
52	P	Leon Šušnja	5 August 1993 (age 33)	2.04 m	42	24	(Poland) Wisła Płock
57	RW	Filip Glavaš	6 May 1997 (age 29)	1.83 m	62	209	(Croatia) RK Zagreb
33	CB	Luka Cindrić	5 July 1993 (age 33)	1.81 m	128	354	(Hungary) Veszprém KC
23	P	Zlatko Raužan	14 February 2002 (age 24)	1.89 m	3	4	(Croatia) RK Zagreb
28	CB	Berislav Antonio Tokić	5 January 2006 (age 20)	1.94 m	4	2	(Croatia) MRK Trogir
0	RW	Petar Šprem	20 November 2006 (age 19)	1.82 m	1	1	(Croatia) MRK Dugo Selo
0	LB	Tio Malović	24 November 2005 (age 20)	1.94 m	0	0	(Slovenia) ŽRK Ajdovščina

=== Recent call-ups ===
Rest of the team who got called up for Friendly International Matches against Switzerland in March 2026 and/or Sweden in May 2026

No.	Pos.	Name	Date of birth (age)	Height	App.	Goals	Club
10	P	Josip Šimić	10 May 2000 (age 26)	1.94 m	15	14	(Germany) HSG Wetzlar
0	GK	Tin Herceg	2 February 2004 (age 22)	1.89 m	0	0	(Germany) HC Erlangen
14	LB	Diano Neris Ćeško	17 April 2004 (age 22)	1.96 m	5	9	(Croatia) RK Zagreb
0	RB	Patrik Martinović	29 August 2000 (age 26)	1.88 m	0	0	(Switzerland) Kadetten Schaffhausen
0	LB	Teo Popović	6 December 2004 (age 21)	1.99 m	0	0	(Croatia) RK Porec
43	GK	Dino Slavić	4 December 1992 (age 33)	1.85 m	10	0	(North Macedonia) GRK Ohrid
9	RB	Luka Lovre Klarica	25 September 2001 (age 25)	1.98 m	47	111	(Poland) KS Iskra Kielce

=== Past players ===
Players called for the team in 2025

No.	Pos.	Name	Date of birth (age)	Height	App.	Goals	Club
2	LW	Lovro Mihić	25 August 1994 (age 32)	1.80 m	73	107	(Poland) Wisla Plock
45	LB	Halil Jaganjac	22 June 1998 (age 28)	2.00 m	12	31	(Germany) Rhein-Neckar Löwen
0	LB	Luka Moslavac	8 March 1998 (age 28)	1.95 m	4	11	(Croatia) RK Nexe Našice
0	GK	Filip Perić	17 December 1998 (age 27)	1.90 m	6	0	(Croatia) MRK Sesvete
0	LW	Ivan Barbić	1 October 2002 (age 24)	1.84 m	3	2	(Croatia) RK Nexe Našice
0	LB	Ante Ivanković	15 August 2000 (age 26)	1.95 m	2	5	(North Macedonia) GRK Ohrid
0	RB	Matej Svržnjak	16 January 2003 (age 23)	1.92 m	2	0	(Croatia) MRK Sesvete
0	RW	Maksimilijan Molc	3 February 2004 (age 22)	1.90 m	1	1	(Croatia) MRK Sesvete
0	GK	Toni Matošević	28 July 2004 (age 22)	2.02 m	3	2	(Croatia) HRK Gorica Velika Gorica

=== Coaching staff ===
As of 11 January 2026

Role	Name
Head coach	(Iceland) Dagur Sigurðsson
Assistant coach	(Croatia) Denis Špoljarić
Goalkeeping coach	(Croatia) Valter Matošević
Conditioning coaches	(Croatia) Miljenko Rak (Croatia) Danijel Brajković
Physiotherapists	(Croatia) Goran Krušelj (Croatia) Matija Rajnović
Team manager	(Croatia) Ivica Maraš
Sporting director	
Technique	(Croatia) Zdravko Mirilović

=== Head coaches ===
- (Croatia) Josip Milković (1990–1991)
- (Croatia) Zdravko Zovko (1991–1995)
- (Bosnia and Herzegovina) (Croatia) Abas Arslanagić (1995–1996)
- (Croatia) Vlado Nekić (1996; Acting)
- (Croatia) Velimir Kljaić (1996)
- (Croatia) Ivan Duvnjak (1996; Acting)
- (Croatia) Damir Čavlović (1996; Acting)
- (Croatia) Josip Glavaš (1997)
- (Croatia) Ilija Puljević (1997–1998)
- (Croatia) Velimir Kljaić (1998–1999)
- (Croatia) Zdravko Zovko (1999–2000)
- (Croatia) Josip Milković (2000–2002)
- (Croatia) Lino Červar (2002–2010)
- (Croatia) Irfan Smajlagić (2003, 2004, and 2005; Acting)
- (Croatia) Slavko Goluža (2010–2015)
- (Croatia) Željko Babić (2015–2017)
- (Croatia) Lino Červar (2017–2021)
- (Croatia) Hrvoje Horvat (2021–2023)
- (Croatia) Goran Perkovac (2023–2024)
- (Iceland) Dagur Sigurðsson (2024–)

=== Captains ===
- (Croatia) Alvaro Načinović (1992–1996)
- (Croatia) Goran Perkovac (1996–1998)
- (Croatia) Patrik Ćavar (1998–1999)
- (Croatia) Slavko Goluža (1999–2006)
- (Croatia) Petar Metličić (2006–2009)
- (Croatia) Igor Vori (2009–2015)
- (Croatia) Marko Kopljar (2015–2017)
- (Croatia) Domagoj Duvnjak (2017–2025)
- (Croatia) Ivan Martinović (2025- )

=== Notable players ===
- Patrik Ćavar
- Alvaro Načinović
- Goran Perkovac
- Zlatko Saračević
- Slavko Goluža
- Ivano Balić
- Igor Vori
- Petar Metličić
- Vlado Šola
- Mirza Džomba
- Blaženko Lacković
- Domagoj Duvnjak
- Mirko Alilović
- Zlatko Horvat
- Ivan Čupić
- Manuel Štrlek
- Marko Kopljar
- Dominik Kuzmanović
- Ivan Martinović
- Mario Šoštarić

=== Medal-winning squads ===
- Gold medal at the 1993 Mediterranean Games: Tonči Peribonio, Mirko Bašić, Goran Perkovac, Alvaro Načinović, Ivica Obrvan, Bruno Gudelj, Iztok Puc, Zlatko Saračević, Ratko Tomljanović, Vlado Šola, Vladimir Jelčić, Patrik Ćavar, Irfan Smajlagić, Nenad Kljaić
  - coach: Zdravko Zovko
- Bronze medal at the 1994 European Championship: Zvonimir Bilić, Patrik Ćavar, Darko Franović, Slavko Goluža, Bruno Gudelj, Vladimir Jelčić, Nenad Kljaić, Valter Matošević, Alvaro Načinović, Ivica Obrvan, Tonči Peribonio, Goran Perkovac, Iztok Puc, Zlatko Saračević, Irfan Smajlagić, Vlado Šola, Ratko Tomljanović
  - coach: Zdravko Zovko
- Silver medal at the 1995 World Championship: Goran Perkovac, Irfan Smajlagić, Alvaro Načinović, Iztok Puc, Zlatko Saračević, Patrik Ćavar, Ratko Tomljanović, Vlado Šola, Valter Matošević, Zvonimir Bilić, Slavko Goluža, Božidar Jović, Venio Losert, Boris Jarak, Tomislav Farkaš, Mirza Šarić
  - coach: Zdravko Zovko
- Gold medal at the 1996 Olympics: Patrik Ćavar, Valner Franković, Slavko Goluža, Bruno Gudelj, Vladimir Jelčić, Božidar Jović, Nenad Kljaić, Venio Losert, Valter Matošević, Zoran Mikulić, Alvaro Načinović, Goran Perkovac, Iztok Puc, Zlatko Saračević, Irfan Smajlagić, Vladimir Šujster
  - coach: Velimir Kljaić
- Gold medal at the 1997 Mediterranean Games: Goran Perkovac, Valter Matošević, Valner Franković, Božidar Jović, Miro Barišić, Mario Bjeliš, Goran Jerković, Mirza Džomba, Enes Halkić, Davor Dominiković, Silvio Ivandija, Igor Kos, Dragan Jerković, Neno Boban, Mario Kelentrić, Mladen Prskalo
  - coach: Velimir Kljaić
- Gold medal at the 2001 Mediterranean Games: Ivano Balić, Tihomir Baltić, Zvonimir Bilić, Davor Dominiković, Mirza Džomba, Slavko Goluža, Božidar Jović, Mario Kelentrić, Igor Kos, Blaženko Lacković, Valter Matošević, Diego Modrušan, Goran Šprem, Renato Sulić, Vedran Zrnić
  - coach: Josip Milković
- Gold medal at the 2003 World Championship: Ivano Balić, Davor Dominiković, Mirza Džomba, Slavko Goluža, Božidar Jović, Nikša Kaleb, Mario Kelentrić, Blaženko Lacković, Valter Matošević, Petar Metličić, Vlado Šola, Denis Špoljarić, Goran Šprem, Renato Sulić, Tonči Valčić, Igor Vori, Vedran Zrnić
  - coach: Lino Červar
- Gold medal at the 2004 Olympics: Ivano Balić, Davor Dominiković, Mirza Džomba, Slavko Goluža, Nikša Kaleb, Blaženko Lacković, Venio Losert, Valter Matošević, Petar Metličić, Vlado Šola, Denis Špoljarić, Goran Šprem, Igor Vori, Drago Vuković, Vedran Zrnić
  - coach: Lino Červar
- Silver medal at the 2005 World Championship: Venio Losert, Nikša Kaleb, Ivano Balić, Blaženko Lacković, Vedran Zrnić, Igor Vori, Davor Dominiković, Mirza Džomba, Vlado Šola, Zoran Jeftić, Slavko Goluža, Nikola Blažičko, Goran Šprem, Denis Špoljarić, Petar Metličić, Denis Buntić
  - coach: Lino Červar
- Silver medal at the 2005 Mediterranean Games: Damir Bičanić, Nikola Blažičko, Denis Buntić, Josip Čale, Ivan Čupić, Zlatko Horvat, Tomislav Huljina, Krešimir Ivanković, Marin Knez, Branimir Koloper, Mario Obad, Vladimir Ostarčević, Ivan Pongračić, Vjenceslav Somić, Ljubo Vukić, Drago Vuković
  - coach: Lino Červar
- Silver medal at the 2008 European Championship: Nikša Kaleb, Renato Sulić, Ivano Balić, Domagoj Duvnjak, Blaženko Lacković, Igor Vori, Davor Dominiković, Vjenceslav Somić, Zlatko Horvat, Drago Vuković, Dragan Jerković, Denis Špoljarić, Petar Metličić, Josip Valčić, Ljubo Vukić, Tonči Valčić, Mirko Alilović, Ivan Čupić
  - coach: Lino Červar
- Silver medal at the 2009 World Championship: Venio Losert, Mateo Hrvatin, Ivano Balić, Domagoj Duvnjak, Blaženko Lacković, Vedran Zrnić, Marko Kopljar, Igor Vori, Jakov Gojun, Zlatko Horvat, Ivan Pešić, Goran Šprem, Denis Špoljarić, Petar Metličić, Denis Buntić, Josip Valčić, Tonči Valčić, Mirko Alilović, Ivan Čupić, Dalibor Anušić, Ivan Ninčević
  - coach: Lino Červar
- Silver medal at the 2010 European Championship: Ivano Balić, Domagoj Duvnjak, Blaženko Lacković, Vedran Zrnić, Marko Kopljar, Igor Vori, Jakov Gojun, Goran Čarapina, Drago Vuković, Vedran Mataija, Damir Bičanić, Denis Buntić, Tonči Valčić, Mirko Alilović, Manuel Štrlek, Ivan Čupić, Željko Musa, Luka Raković.
  - coach: Lino Červar
- Bronze medal at the 2012 European Championship: Ivano Balić, Domagoj Duvnjak, Blaženko Lacković, Marko Kopljar, Igor Vori, Jakov Gojun, Venio Losert, Zlatko Horvat, Drago Vuković, Damir Bičanić, Denis Buntić, Mirko Alilović, Manuel Štrlek, Ivan Čupić, Željko Musa, Ivan Ninčević
  - coach: Slavko Goluža
- Bronze medal at the 2012 Olympics: Venio Losert, Ivano Balić, Domagoj Duvnjak, Blaženko Lacković, Marko Kopljar, Igor Vori, Jakov Gojun, Zlatko Horvat, Drago Vuković, Damir Bičanić, Denis Buntić, Mirko Alilović, Manuel Štrlek, Ivan Čupić, Ivan Ninčević
  - coach: Slavko Goluža
- Bronze medal at the 2013 World Championship: Mirko Alilović, Filip Ivić, Ivan Čupić, Zlatko Horvat, Manuel Štrlek, Lovro Šprem, Marko Kopljar, Luka Stepančić, Domagoj Duvnjak, Jakov Gojun, Damir Bičanić, Drago Vuković, Stipe Mandalinić, Blaženko Lacković, Igor Vori, Marino Marić, Ivan Ninčević
  - coach: Slavko Goluža
- Silver medal at the 2013 Mediterranean Games: Ivan Pešić, Ivan Stevanović, Hrvoje Batinović, Lovro Šprem, Jerko Matulić, Nik Dominik Tominec, Marino Marić, Filip Gavranović, Ivan Slišković, Stefan Vujić, Marko Matic, Luka Stepančić, Robert Markotić, Igor Karačić, Damir Batinović, Josip Vidović
  - coach: Slavko Goluža
- Bronze medal at the 2016 European Championship: Ivan Stevanović, Marino Marić, Domagoj Duvnjak, Marko Kopljar, Jakov Gojun, Zlatko Horvat, Igor Karačić, Krešimir Kozina, Mirko Alilović, Manuel Štrlek, Ivan Čupić, Antonio Kovačević, Marko Mamić, Luka Šebetić, Ivan Slišković, Luka Cindrić, Ilija Brozović
  - coach: Željko Babić
- Silver medal at the 2020 European Championship: Marino Marić, Domagoj Duvnjak, Matej Hrstić, Luka Stepančić, Zlatko Horvat, Josip Šarac, Igor Karačić, Željko Musa, Marko Mamić, Luka Cindrić, Ilija Brozović, Vlado Matanović, David Mandić, Valentino Ravnić, Marin Šipić, Marin Šego, Matej Ašanin
  - coach: Lino Červar
- Silver medal at the 2025 World Championship: Dominik Kuzmanović, Ivan Pešić, Mario Šoštarič, Filip Glavaš, Marin Jelinić, David Mandić, Lovro Mihić, Marin Šipić, Josip Šimić, Veron Načinović, Leon Šušnja, Marko Mamić, Zvonimir Srna, Tin Lučin, Ivan Martinović, Luka Lovre Klarica, Mateo Maraš, Domagoj Duvnjak, Luka Cindrić, Igor Karačić, Ivano Pavlović
  - coach: Dagur Sigurðsson
- Bronze medal at the 2026 European Championship: Dominik Kuzmanović, Matej Mandić, Dino Slavić, Mario Šoštarič, Filip Glavaš, David Mandić, Marin Jelinić, Veron Načinović, Zlatko Raužan, Josip Šimić, Leon Šušnja, Marko Mamić, Zvonimir Srna, Tin Lučin, Diano Neris Ćeško, Ivan Martinović, Mateo Maraš, Luka Lovre Klarica, Luka Cindrić, Ivano Pavlović
  - coach: Dagur Sigurðsson

=== Notable players ===
- Alvaro Načinović
  - Franjo Bučar State Award for Sport: 1996
- Irfan Smajlagić
  - part of the all-star team of the 1995 World Championship as the best right wing
  - Best Croatian handballer of 1995 by CHF & SN
  - part of the all-star team of the 1996 Olympic tournament as the best right wing
  - Franjo Bučar State Award for Sport: 1996 and 2004
- Patrik Ćavar
  - Best Croatian handballer of 1994, 1997 and 2000 by CHF & SN
  - top scorer and part of the all-star team of the 1996 Olympic tournament as the best left wing
  - Franjo Bučar State Award for Sport: 1996
  - Best % of goals scored for the national team – 5.33
  - 2nd top goalscorer of the national team – 639 goals
- Ivano Balić
  - IHF World Player of the Year 2003 and 2006
  - Croatian Sportsman of the Year: 2007
  - MVP and part of the all-star team of the 2004 European Championship as the best centre back
  - part of the all-star team of the 2004 Olympic tournament as the best centre back
  - MVP and part of the all-star team of the 2005 World Championship as the best centre back
  - MVP and part of the all-star team of the 2006 European Championship as the best centre back
  - MVP of the 2007 World Championship
  - top scorer and part of the all-star team of the 2008 European Championship as the best centre back
- Mirza Džomba
  - part of the all-star team of the 2003 World Championship as the best right wing
  - MVP and top scorer of the 2004 European Championship
  - part of the all-star team of the 2004 Olympic tournament as the best right wing
  - Franjo Bučar State Award for Sport: 2004
  - part of the all-star team of the 2005 World Championship as the best right wing
  - Best Croatian handballer of 2005 by CHF & SN
  - Best right wing in the history by EHF
  - All-time goalscorer of the national team – 719 goals
- Valter Matošević
  - 2nd best goalkeeper at 1995 World Championship
  - Best Croatian handballer of 1995 by CHF & SN
  - Franjo Bučar State Award for Sport: 1996 and 2004
  - Record in the national team for the number of saves in one match – 24
- Slavko Goluža
  - Franjo Bučar State Award for Sport: 1996, 2004 and 2009
  - Best Croatian handball player by CHF & Sportske novosti: 2001
  - Trophy MOO for sports and promoting optimism: 2007

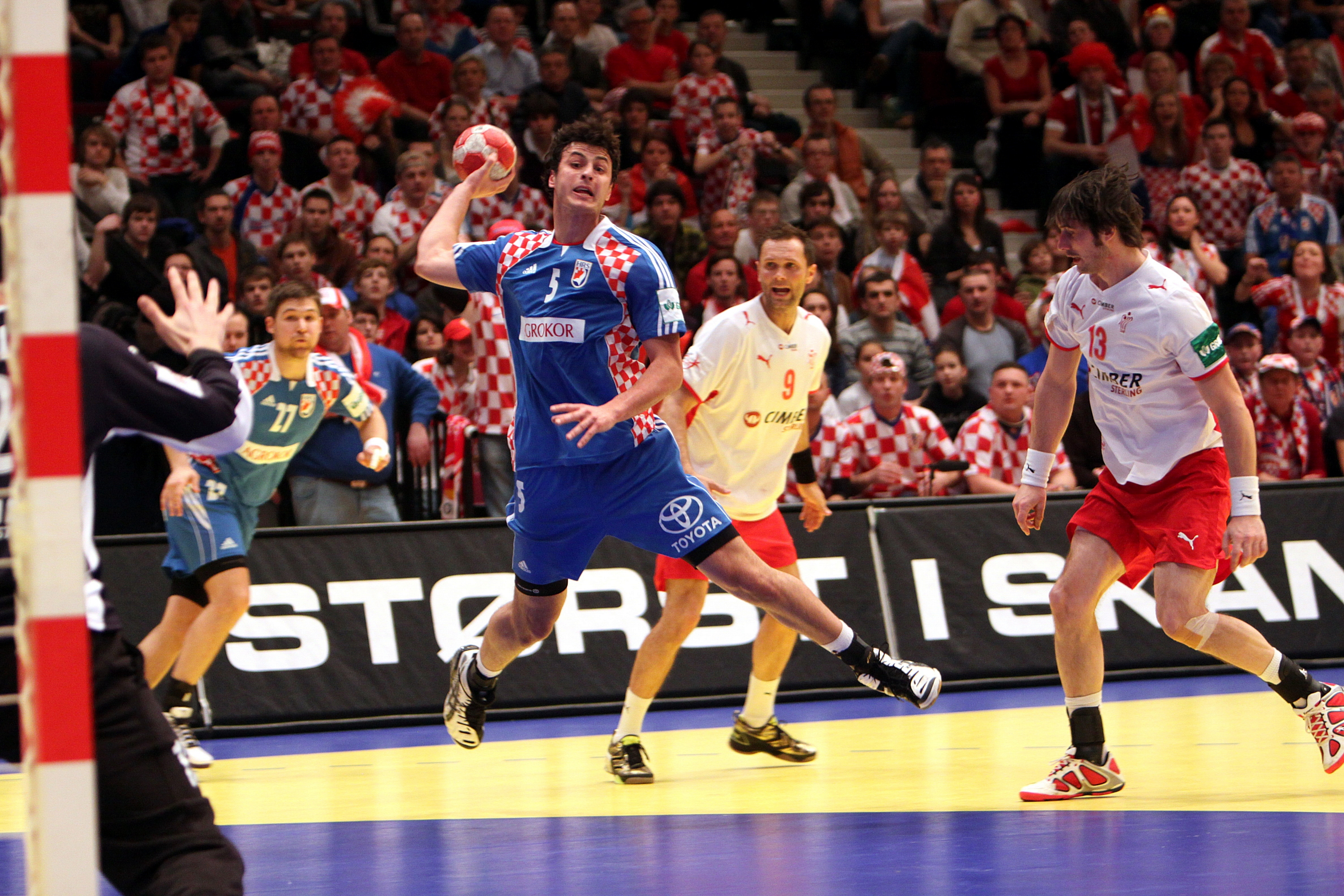
Domagoj Duvnjak holds the record for most appearances and goals for the Croatian national team

- Igor Vori
  - best defence player of the 2008 European Championship
  - MVP and part of the all-star team of the 2009 World Championship as the best pivot
  - part of the all-star team of the 2010 European Championship as the best pivot
- Ivan Čupić
  - part of the all-star team of the 2009 World Championship as the best right wing
  - part of the all-star team of the 2012 Olympic tournament as the best right wing
- Blaženko Lacković
  - part of the all-star team of the 2009 World Championship as the best left back
- Jakov Gojun
  - best defence player of the 2010 European Championship
- Manuel Štrlek
  - part of the all-star team of the 2010 European Championship as the best left wing
  - part of the all-star team of the 2016 European Championship as the best left wing
- Vedran Zrnić
  - part of the all-star team of the 2011 World Championship as the best right wing
- Marko Kopljar
  - part of the all-star team of the 2012 European Championship as the best right back
- Domagoj Duvnjak
  - IHF World Player of the Year 2013
  - part of the all-star team of the 2013 World Championship as the best playmaker
  - part of the all-star team of the 2014 European Championship as the best centre back
  - part of the all-star team of the 2017 World Championship as the best centre back
  - MVP of the 2020 European Championship
- Venio Losert
  - Franjo Bučar State Award for Sport: 1996 and 2004
  - 3rd best goalkeeper at 2004 Summer Olympics
- Davor Dominiković
  - Franjo Bučar State Award for Sport: 2004
- Iztok Puc
  - Franjo Bučar State Award for Sport: 1996
- Ivan Martinović
  - part of the all-star team of the 2025 World Championship as the best right back
- Mario Šoštarić
  - part of the all-star team of the 2025 World Championship as the best right wing
  - part of the all-star team of the 2026 European Championship as the best right wing

=== Statistics ===
==== Most appearances ====
Name	Matches	Position	Years
Domagoj Duvnjak	257	CB	2006–2025
Igor Vori	246	LP	2001–2018
Venio Losert	211	GK	1995–2015
Slavko Goluža	204	CB, LP	1991–2006
Ivano Balić	198	CB	2001–2012
Blaženko Lacković	195	OB	2001–2013
Zlatko Horvat	191	W	2005–2020
Valter Matošević	191	GK	1992–2004
Goran Perkovac	190	LB	1992–2000
Vedran Zrnić	189	W	2001–2010
Mirza Džomba	185	W	1997–2008
Petar Metličić	175	OB	1997–2009
Davor Dominiković	174	D, OB	1997–2008
Manuel Štrlek	173	W	2010–2021
Jakov Gojun	166	D	2008–2018
Mirko Alilović	164	GK	2006–2018
Drago Vuković	157	CB/OB, D	2004–2014
Ivan Čupić	156	W	2005–2024
Mirko Alilović	152	GK	2006–2018
Božidar Jović	151	LP	1995–2003
Zvonimir Bilić	147	OB	1995–2002
Nenad Kljaić	145	LP	1991–2001
Tonči Valčić	144	OB	1999–2010
Marko Kopljar	137	OB	2008–2018
Vlado Šola	132	GK	1991–2006
Denis Špoljarić	131	D	2003–2009
Denis Buntić	131	OB	2005–2018
Patrik Ćavar	120	W	1991–2003
Goran Šprem	109	W	1999–2009
Alvaro Načinović	105	LP	1992–2000
Renato Sulić	100	LP	2001–2008

==== Top scorers ====
Name	Goals	Average	Position	Years
Domagoj Duvnjak	771	3.00	CB	2006–2025
Mirza Džomba	719	3.89	W	1997–2008
Patrik Ćavar	639	5.33	W	1991–2003
Manuel Štrlek	600	3.16	W	2010–2021
Zlatko Horvat	590	2.51	W	2008–2020
Igor Vori	590	2.39	P	2001–2018
Ivan Čupić	577	3.90	W	2005–2024
Blaženko Lacković	571	2.93	OB	2001–2013
Vedran Zrnić	571	2.03	W	2001–2010
Slavko Goluža	545		CB, LB	1991–2006
Ivano Balić	535	2.70	CB	2001–2012
Zvonimir Bilić	500		OB	1995–2002
Petar Metličić	471	2.83	OB	1997–2009
Iztok Puc	325	2.23	OB	1991–1998
Marko Kopljar	322		RB	2005–2018
Denis Buntić	293		RB	2005–2018
Irfan Smajlagić	290		W	1991–2000
Goran Šprem	277		W	1999–2009
Zlatko Saračević	244		OB	1992–2000
Luka Stepančić	241		OB	2013–
Igor Karačić	236	2.41	CB	2013–
Luka Cindrić	229	2.66	CB	2014–
Tonči Valčić	226		OB	1999–2010
Renato Sulić	221		P	2001–2008
Drago Vuković	210		OB	2004–2014
Davor Dominiković	205		OB	1997–2008
Damir Bičanić	176		OB	2005–2020
Alvaro Načinović	165		P	1992–2000
Nikša Kaleb	152		W	1999–2010
Ivan Slišković	140		OB	2013–
Zeljko Musa	118	0,81	W	2017–
Ivan Martinović	107	3.96	OB	2019–
Božidar Jović	100		P	1995–2003

Players that played for Croatian National Handball Team after the breakup of Yugoslavia and
collected 100+ caps combined for Yugoslavian and Croatian National Handball Teams.

Name	Matches	Position	Years
Nenad Kljaić	214	OB	1987–2001
Valter Matošević	213	GK	1989–2004
Goran Perkovac	202	OB	1988–2000
Zlatko Saračević	181	OB	1981–2000
Mirko Bašić	180	GK	1979–2000
Iztok Puc	147	OB	1988–1998
Alvaro Načinović	144	P	1988–2000
Tonči Peribonio	139	GK	1986–1994
Patrik Ćavar	135	W	1989–2004
Irfan Smajlagić	123	W	1987–2001
Zoran Mikulić	62	OB	1989–2001
Boris Jarak	40		1988–1996

== Record against other teams ==
As of 14 December 2025

Key
Positive total balance (more wins)
Neutral total balance (equal W/L ratio)
Negative total balance (more losses)

National team	Total				Olympic Games				World Championship				European Championship				Mediterranean Games				Qualifications			
National team	Pld	W	D	L	Pld	W	D	L	Pld	W	D	L	Pld	W	D	L	Pld	W	D	L	Pld	W	D	L
Algeria	4	3	0	1	0	0	0	0	2	2	0	0	—	—	—	—	1	0	0	1	1	1	0	0
Angola	1	1	0	0	0	0	0	0	1	1	0	0	—	—	—	—	0	0	0	0	0	0	0	0
Argentina	5	3	0	2	1	1	0	0	4	2	0	2	—	—	—	—	—	—	—	—	0	0	0	0
Australia	3	3	0	0	0	0	0	0	3	3	0	0	—	—	—	—	—	—	—	—	0	0	0	0
Austria	7	7	0	0	0	0	0	0	1	1	0	0	1	1	0	0	—	—	—	—	4	4	0	0
Bahrain	3	3	0	0	0	0	0	0	2	2	0	0	—	—	—	—	—	—	—	—	1	1	0	0
Belgium	2	2	0	0	0	0	0	0	0	0	0	0	—	—	—	—	—	—	—	—	2	2	0	0
Belarus	12	10	2	0	0	0	0	0	2	2	0	0	3	3	0	0	—	—	—	—	6	4	2	0
(Bosnia and Herzegovina) Bosnia and Herzegovina	2	1	1	0	0	0	0	0	1	1	0	0	0	0	0	0	0	0	0	0	0	0	0	0
Brazil	3	2	0	1	1	1	0	0	1	1	0	0	—	—	—	—	—	—	—	—	0	0	0	0
Bulgaria	2	2	0	0	0	0	0	0	0	0	0	0	0	0	0	0	—	—	—	—	2	2	0	0
China	2	2	0	0	0	0	0	0	1	1	0	0	—	—	—	—	—	—	—	—	0	0	0	0
Chile	2	2	0	0	0	0	0	0	1	1	0	0	—	—	—	—	—	—	—	—	1	1	0	0
China	2	2	0	0	1	1	0	0	1	1	0	0	—	—	—	—	—	—	—	—	0	0	0	0
Cuba	3	2	1	0	0	0	0	0	3	2	1	0	—	—	—	—	—	—	—	—	0	0	0	0
Czech Republic	7	6	0	1	0	0	0	0	2	1	0	1	3	3	0	0	—	—	—	—	2	2	0	0
Denmark	20	9	1	11	3	3	0	0	7	2	0	5	10	4	0	6	—	—	—	—	1	0	0	1
Egypt	7	6	0	1	0	0	0	0	4	4	0	0	—	—	—	—	3	2	0	1	0	0	0	0
Finland	4	4	0	0	0	0	0	0	0	0	0	0	0	0	0	0	—	—	—	—	4	4	0	0
France	25	10	1	14	5	2	0	3	8	5	0	3	11	2	1	8	0	0	0	0	0	0	0	0
Germany	15	8	1	6	1	1	0	0	5	3	1	1	4	3	0	1	—	—	—	—	0	0	0	0
Greece	6	6	0	0	1	1	0	0	0	0	0	0	0	0	0	0	3	3	0	0	2	2	0	0
Greenland	1	1	0	0	0	0	0	0	1	1	0	0	—	—	—	—	—	—	—	—	0	0	0	0
Hungary	18	13	1	4	3	3	0	0	8	7	0	1	4	2	1	1	—	—	—	—	4	2	0	2
Iceland	8	7	1	0	1	1	0	0	2	2	0	0	4	3	1	0	—	—	—	—	3	2	0	1
Iran	1	1	0	0	0	0	0	0	1	1	0	0	—	—	—	—	—	—	—	—	0	0	0	0
Italy	3	3	0	0	0	0	0	0	0	0	0	0	0	0	0	0	2	2	0	0	0	0	0	0
Japan	5	4	1	0	0	0	0	0	2	1	1	0	—	—	—	—	—	—	—	—	2	2	0	0
Kuwait	3	3	0	0	1	1	0	0	2	2	0	0	—	—	—	—	—	—	—	—	0	0	0	0
Latvia	2	2	0	0	0	0	0	0	0	0	0	0	0	0	0	0	—	—	—	—	2	2	0	0
Lithuania	2	2	0	0	0	0	0	0	0	0	0	0	0	0	0	0	—	—	—	—	2	2	0	0
(North Macedonia) Macedonia	6	6	0	0	0	0	0	0	1	1	0	0	2	2	0	0	0	0	0	0	2	1	0	1
Montenegro	9	8	0	1	0	0	0	0	0	0	0	0	3	3	0	0	0	0	0	0	0	0	0	0
Morocco	3	3	0	0	0	0	0	0	3	3	0	0	—	—	—	—	0	0	0	0	0	0	0	0
Netherlands	2	2	0	0	0	0	0	0	0	0	0	0	0	0	0	0	—	—	—	—	2	2	0	0
Nigeria	1	1	0	0	0	0	0	0	1	1	0	0	—	—	—	—	—	—	—	—	0	0	0	0
Norway	18	11	2	5	0	0	0	0	3	0	1	2	8	6	1	1	—	—	—	—	3	2	0	1
Poland	9	7	0	2	2	1	0	1	3	2	0	1	4	4	0	0	—	—	—	—	0	0	0	0
Portugal	5	3	1	1	0	0	0	0	0	0	0	0	3	2	1	0	—	—	—	—	2	1	0	1
Qatar	3	2	0	1	1	0	0	1	2	2	0	0	—	—	—	—	—	—	—	—	0	0	0	0
Romania	6	6	0	0	0	0	0	0	1	1	0	0	1	1	0	0	—	—	—	—	4	4	0	0
Russia	16	9	1	6	2	2	0	0	6	4	0	2	7	2	1	4	—	—	—	—	1	1	0	0
Saudi Arabia	2	2	0	0	0	0	0	0	2	2	0	0	—	—	—	—	—	—	—	—	0	0	0	0
Serbia *	14	8	2	4	1	1	0	0	3	1	1	1	6	3	0	3	1	1	0	0	2	1	1	0
Slovakia	5	5	0	0	0	0	0	0	1	1	0	0	0	0	0	0	—	—	—	—	4	4	0	0
Slovenia	15	9	0	6	1	1	0	0	4	3	0	1	5	3	0	2	2	1	0	1	4	2	0	2
South Korea	5	4	0	1	2	2	0	0	3	2	0	1	—	—	—	—	—	—	—	—	0	0	0	0
Spain	29	18	2	9	4	3	0	1	10	8	0	2	12	5	2	5	1	0	0	1	3	3	0	0
Sweden	14	7	1	6	2	1	0	1	4	3	0	1	3	2	0	1	—	—	—	—	0	0	0	0
Switzerland	4	4	0	0	1	1	0	0	0	0	0	0	1	1	0	0	—	—	—	—	2	2	0	0
Tunisia	9	9	0	0	2	2	0	0	2	2	0	0	—	—	—	—	2	2	0	0	1	1	0	0
Turkey	6	6	0	0	0	0	0	0	0	0	0	0	0	0	0	0	0	0	0	0	6	6	0	0
Ukraine	3	2	0	1	0	0	0	0	1	0	0	1	2	2	0	0	—	—	—	—	0	0	0	0
United States	2	2	0	0	1	1	0	0	1	1	0	0	—	—	—	—	—	—	—	—	0	0	0	0
Total (53)	359	259	18	82																				

* includes games against Serbia and Montenegro

=== Biggest wins ===
Double digit goal difference

Olympic Games	World Championship	European Championship	Mediterranean Games	Qualifications
+19 vs. Brasil (33–14) 2008; +11 vs. China (33–22) 2008; +11 vs. Denmark (32–21) 2012; +10 vs. South Korea (31–21) 2012	+29 vs. USA (41–12) 2001; +27 vs. Australia (42–15) 2011; +23 vs. Australia (36–13) 2013; +21 vs. Cuba (41–20) 2009; +20 vs. Argentina (38–18) 2011; +20 vs. Australia (38–18) 2005; +20 vs. Cape Verde (44–24) 2025	+14 vs. Poland (37–23) 2016; +13 vs. Ukraine (38–25) 2022; +11 vs. Belarus (33–22) 2014; +10 vs. Macedonia (34–24) 2016; +10 vs. Serbia (32–22) 2018; +10 vs. Spain (39–29) 2024	+8 vs. Greece (33–25) 2005	+20 vs. Chile (35–15) 2012; +20 vs. Finland (34–14) 2010; +19 vs. Finland (39–20) 2010; +15 vs. Japan (37–22) 2008; +14 vs. Japan (36–22) 2012

=== Biggest losses ===
Olympic Games	World Championship	European Championship	Mediterranean Games	Qualifications
-11 vs. Sweden (27-38) 2024; -9 vs. Sweden (18–27) 1996; -7 vs. Qatar (23–30) 2016	-12 vs. Denmark (26–38) 2021; -11 vs. Russia (20–31) 1997	-15 vs. Russia (14–29) 1998; -12 vs. FR Yugoslavia (22–34) 2002; -10 vs. Denmark (20–30) 2008	-7 vs. Spain (21–28) 2005	

== Awards ==
The Croatia national handball team has received numerous award throughout the years.

=== Senior squad ===
- Sportske novosti awards team of the year: 1995, 1996, 2003, 2004 and 2009
- Franjo Bučar State Award for Sport: 1996 and 2004
- Selection of the most successful athletes by COC male team: 2003, 2004, 2006, 2008 and 2009
- Selection of the most successful athletes by COC for promoting Croatia: 2003, 2004 and 2012
- Ivica Jobo Kurtini Award – 2004

=== U-19 squad ===
- Dražen Petrović Award: 2007 and 2009
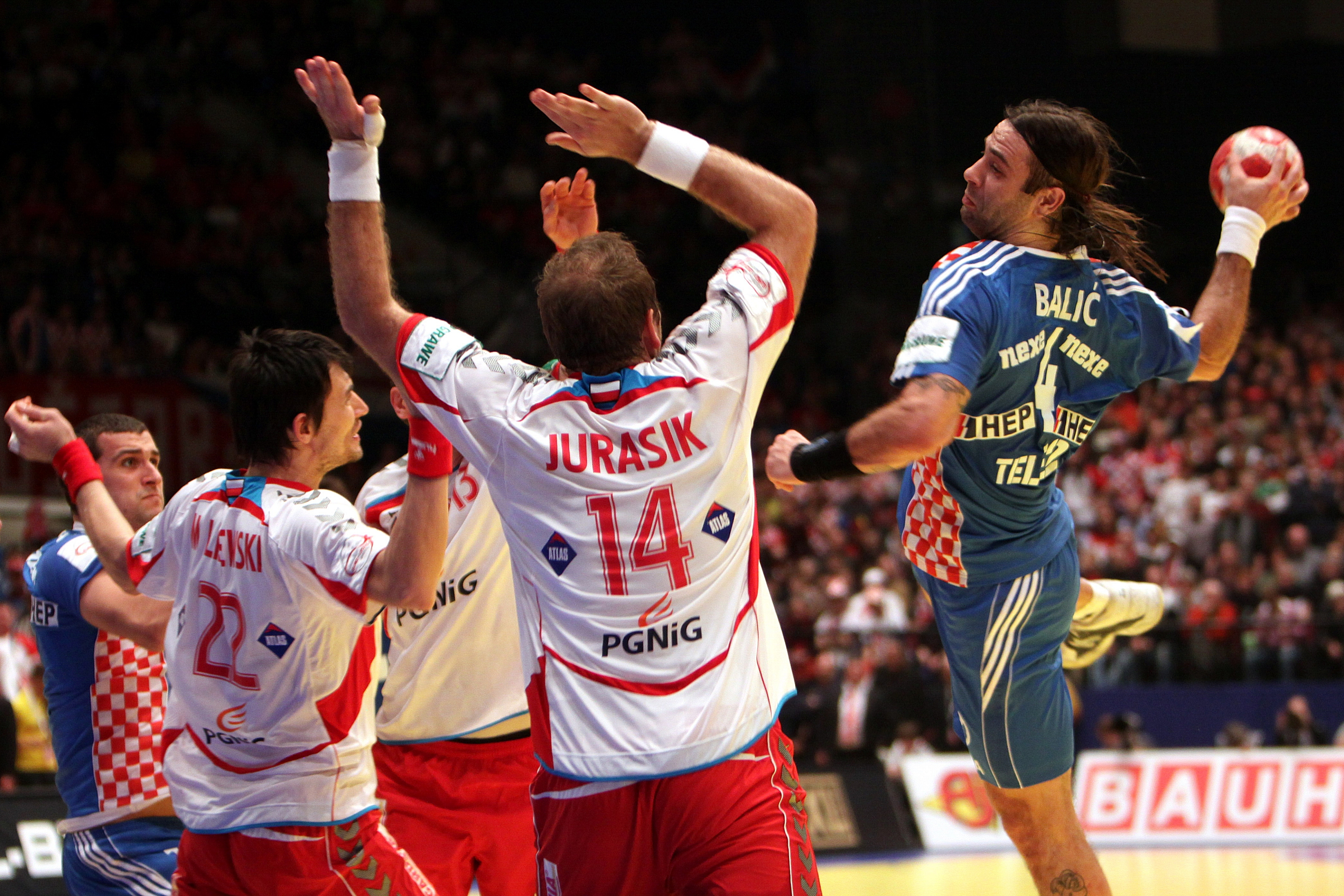
Ivano Balić, the best handball player in history proclaimed by International Handball Federation (IHF), in action

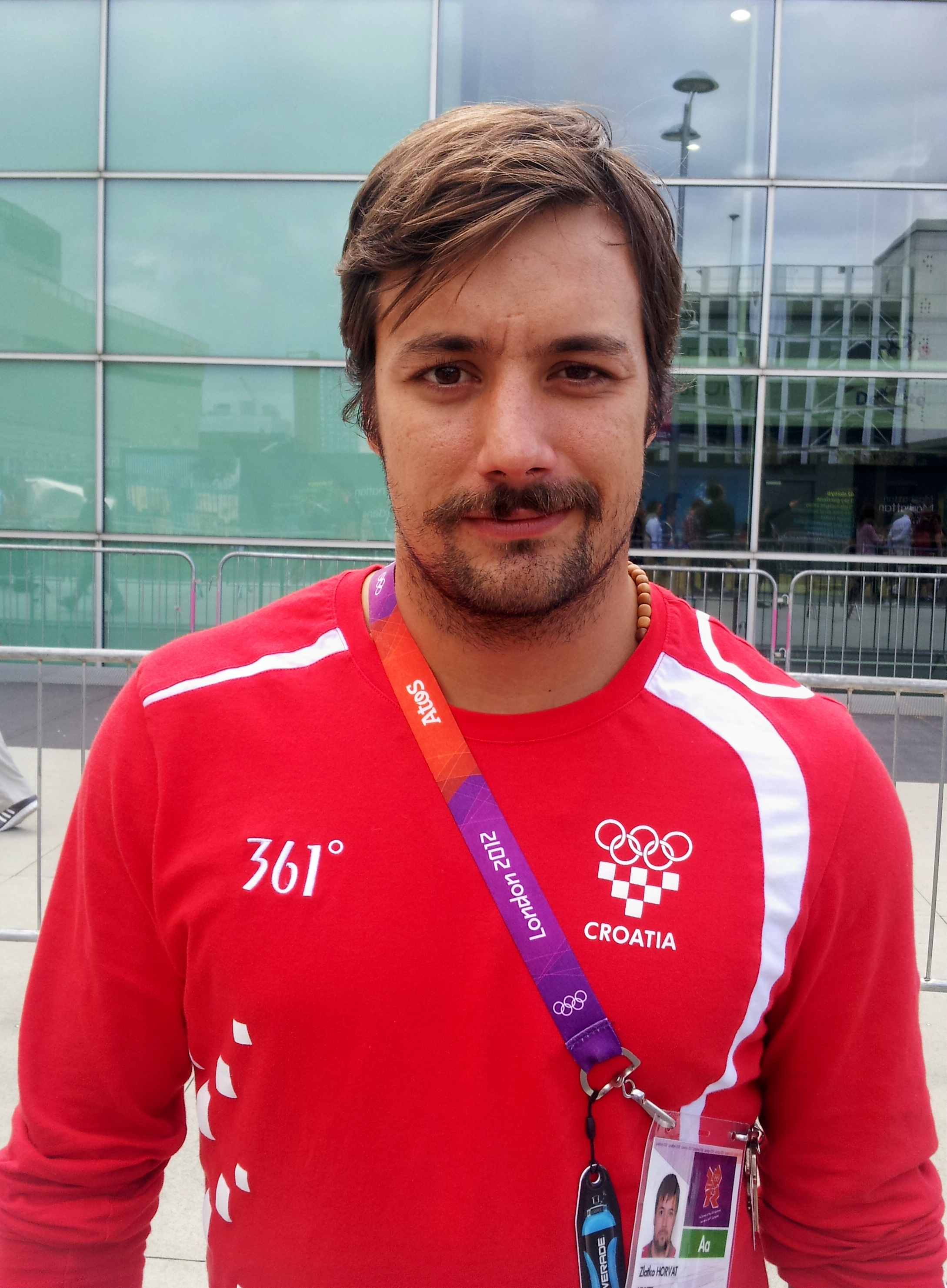
Zlatko Horvat is one of the best Croatian right wings ever

== See also ==
- Croatia women's national handball team
- Croatia national beach handball team
- Croatia women's national beach handball team
