= Peribonio =

Peribonio is a surname. Notable people with the surname include:

- Tomas Peribonio (born 1996), Ecuadorian swimmer
- Tonči Peribonio (born 1960), Croatian handball goalkeeper and coach
