= Ašanin =

Ašanin is a surname. Notable people with the surname include:

- Slađan Ašanin (born 1971), Croatian footballer
- Matej Ašanin (born 1993), Croatian handball player
