= Zoran Mikulić =

Croatian handball player (born 1965)

Personal information
- Full name: Zoran Mikulić
- Nationality: Croatian
- Born: 24 October 1965 (age 60) Travnik, SFR Yugoslavia
- Height: 1.94 m (6 ft 4 in)

Sport
- Sport: Handball
- Position: Left back
- Number: 20

Senior clubs
- Years: Team
- 1982–1986: RK Borac Travnik
- 1986–1990: RK Metaloplastika Šabac
- 1990–1994: SD Caja
- 1994–1995: Academia Octavio
- 1995–1996: BM Granollers
- 1996–2001: TuS Nettelstedt-Lübbecke
- 2001–2004: Raiffeisen Bärnbach/Köflach
- 2004–2005: RK Zadar
National team
Years	Team	Apps
1995–2001	Croatia	62

Teams managed
- 2001–2004: Raiffeisen Bärnbach/Köflach
- 2004–2005: RK Zadar
- 2006–2008: RK Olimpija Vodice
- 2008–2009: RK Split
- 2009–2010: RK Čelik Zenica
- 2011–2012: RK Biograd Na Moru
Medal record
Representing Croatia
Men's handball
Olympic Games
Gold medal – first place	1996 Atlanta	Team

Zoran Mikulić (born 24 October 1965) is a Croatian former professional handball player.

He played for the Croatia national team at the 1996 Summer Olympics in Atlanta, where Croatia won the gold medal.

== Honours ==
Metaloplastika Šabac

- Yugoslav First League (2): 1986–87, 1987–88

BM Granollers

- EHF Cup (1): 1996

TuS Nettelstedt-Lübbecke

- EHF City Cup (2): 1997, 1998

Individual

- Franjo Bučar State Award for Sport - 1996
- Liga ASOBAL 1994–95 top scorer
