= Vladimir Šujster =

Croatian handball player (born 1972)

Personal information
- Nationality: Croatian
- Born: 26 May 1972 (age 54) Samobor, SFR Yugoslavia
- Height: 1.92 m (6 ft 4 in)

Sport
- Sport: Handball
- Position: Right wing
- Number: 10

Youth career
- Years: Team
- 1980-1988: RK Rudar

Senior clubs
- Years: Team
- 1988-1991: RK Rudar
- 1991-1993: Coning Medveščak Zagreb
- 1993-1996: Karlovačka Pivovara
- 1996-1997: Badel 1862 Zagreb
- 1997-1999: Zamet Autotrans
- 1999-2008: RK Rudar
National team
Years	Team	Apps	(Gls)
1996-1998	Croatia	5	(13)
Medal record
Representing Croatia
Men's handball
Olympic Games
Gold medal – first place	1996 Atlanta	Team

Vladimir Šujster (born 26 May 1972) is a retired Croatian handball player.

== Career ==
Šujster started his career in Rudar and later played for the most elite clubs in Croatian handball.

He played for the Croatia men's national handball team at the 1996 Summer Olympics in Atlanta, where Croatia won the gold medal. He also played at the 1998 European Championship in Italy.

In 1997 with Zagreb Šujster got to the finals of the EHF Champions League where they lost to Barcelona.

== Honours ==
Zagreb

- Croatian First A League (1): 1996-97
- Croatian Cup (1): 1997

Individual

- Franjo Bučar State Award for Sport - 1996
- Lifetime achievement award for sports given by the city of Samobor - 2007
