= Luka Šebetić =

Croatian handball player (born 1994)

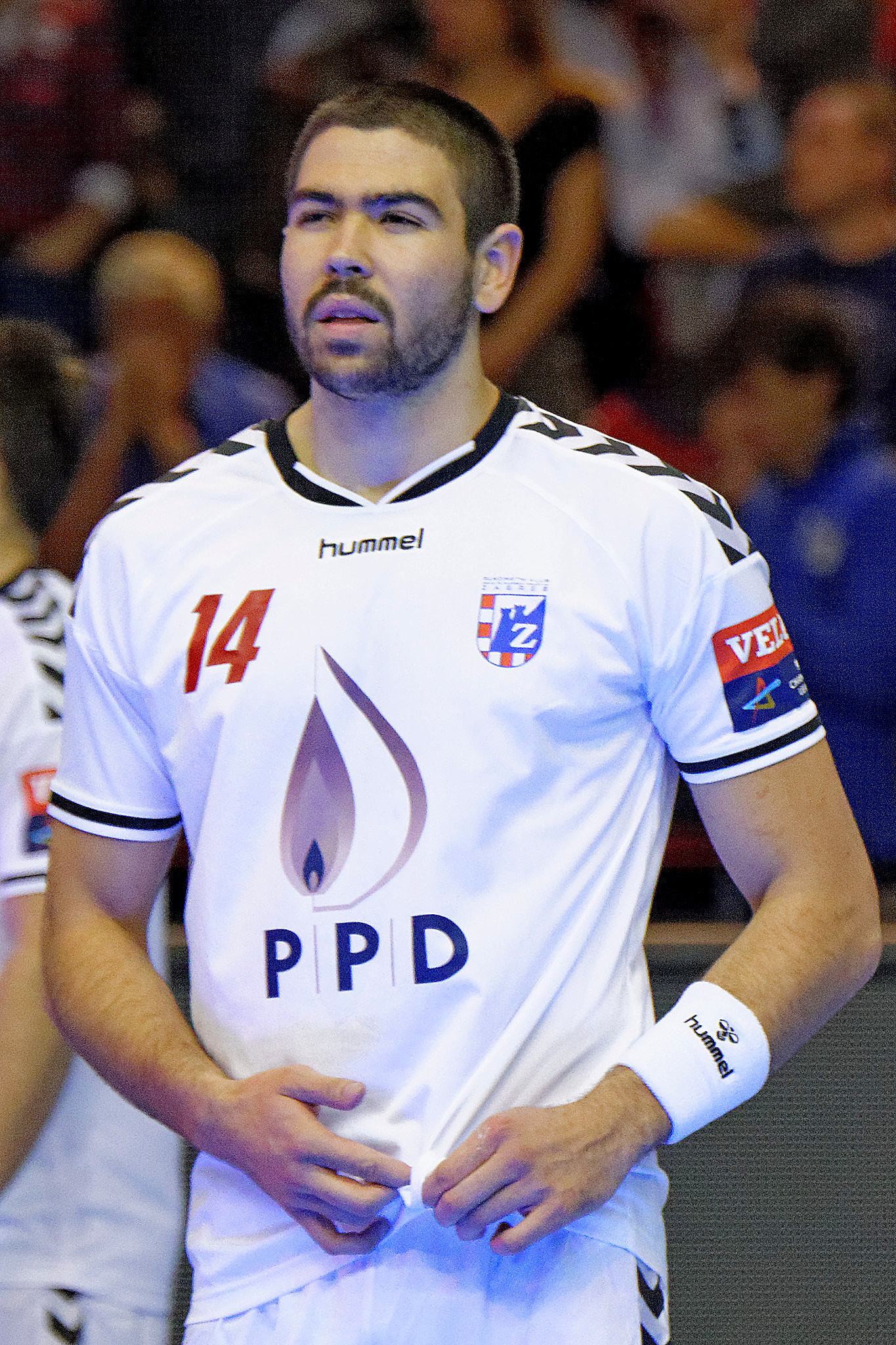

Personal information
- Nationality: Croatian
- Born: 26 May 1994 (age 32) Bjelovar, Croatia
- Height: 1.98 m (6 ft 6 in)

Sport
- Sport: Handball
- Position: Right back
- Current club: GWD Minden
- Number: 40

Senior clubs
- Years: Team
- –2017: RK Zagreb
- 2017–2021: Tremblay-en-France
- 2021–2022: HC Motor Zaporizhzhia
- 2022: → BM Nava
- 2022–: GWD Minden
National team
| Years | Team | Apps | (Gls) |
| – | Croatia | 26 | (44) |
Medal record
European Championship
| Bronze medal – third place | 2016 Poland |

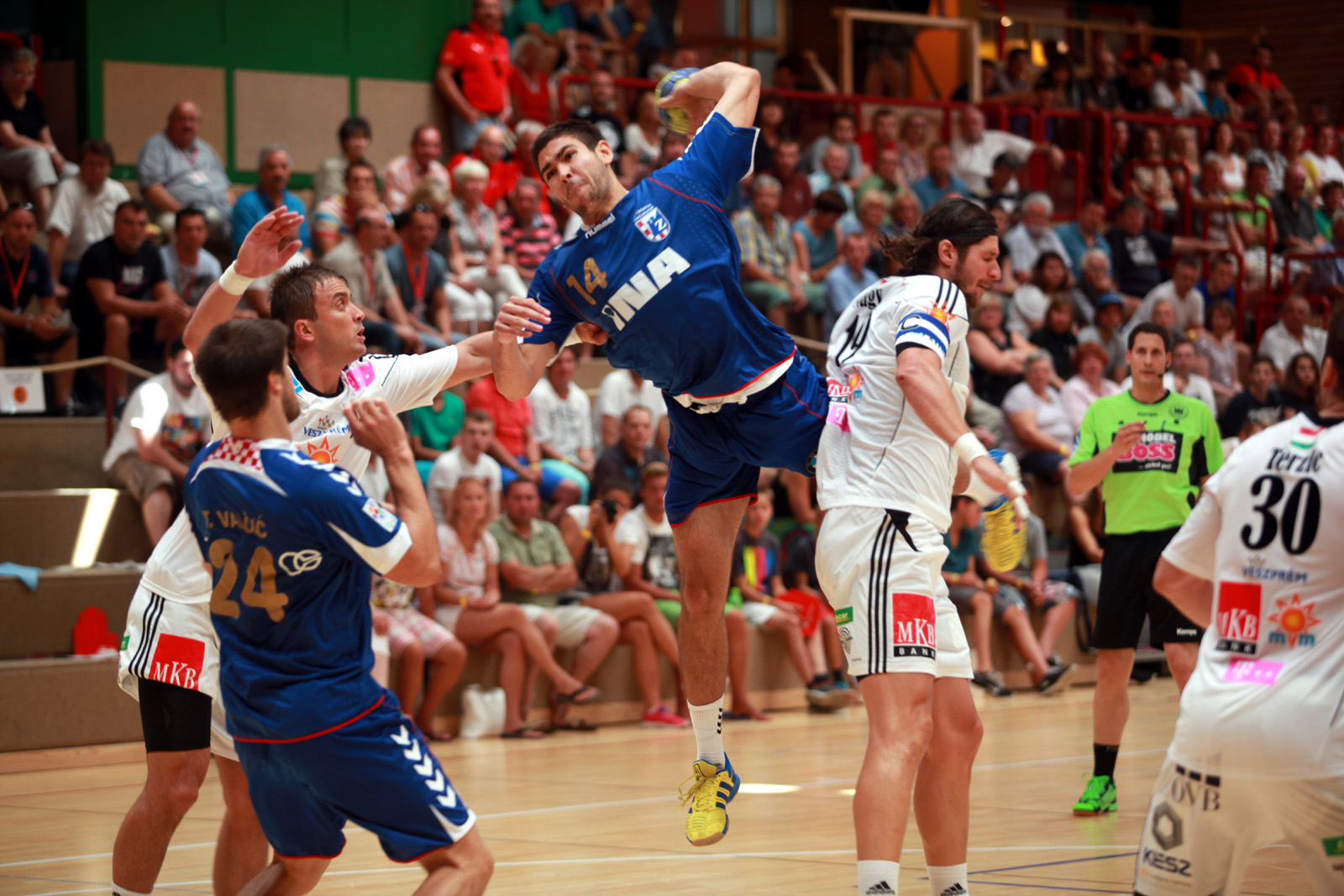
Luka Šebetić, on August 17th, 2013 in Ehingen (Germany), during the Sparkassen Cup (formerly known as Schlecker Cup).

Luka Šebetić (born 26 May 1994) is a Croatian handball player who plays for GWD Minden and the Croatian national team.

He competed at the 2016 European Men's Handball Championship.
