= Valentino Ravnić =

Croatian handball player (born 1995)

Personal information
- Nationality: Croatian
- Born: 20 July 1995 (age 31) Zadar, Croatia
- Height: 1.90 m (6 ft 3 in)

Sport
- Sport: Handball
- Position: Left wing
- Current club: HC Dobrogea Sud Constanța
- Number: 33

Senior clubs
- Years: Team
- 2013-2017: MRK Umag
- 2017-2022: RK Zagreb
- 2022-: HC Dobrogea Sud Constanța
National team
Years	Team	Apps	(Gls)
2019-	Croatia	10	(7)
Medal record
European Championship
Silver medal – second place	2020 Sweden/Austria/Norway
Mediterranean Games
Gold medal – first place	2018 Tarragona	Team

Valentino Ravnić (born 20 July 1995) is a Croatian handball player for HC Dobrogea Sud Constanța and the Croatian national team.

== Career ==
Ravnić started his career at MRK Umag, where he played from 2013 to 2017. He then joined top club RK Zagreb. Here he won the league and cup double in 2018, 2019, 2021 and 2022. In 2022 he joined Romanian HC Dobrogea Sud Constanța.

=== National team ===
Ravnić won gold medals with Croatia at the 2018 Mediterranean Games.

Two years later, he represented Croatia at the 2020 European Championship, where Croatia won silver medals, losing to Spain in the final. Ravnić played 4 games, scoring 2 goals.

At the 2022 European Championship he was once again part of the Croatian team, which finished 8th. He played 2 games, and scored a single goal.
