= Vlado Matanović =

Croatian handball player (born 1995)

Personal information
- Nationality: Croatian
- Born: 29 May 1995 (age 31) Rijeka, Croatia
- Height: 1.82 m (6 ft 0 in)

Sport
- Sport: Handball
- Position: Right wing
- Current club: HC PPD Zagreb
- Number: 11
National team
Years	Team	Apps	(Gls)
2019-	Croatia	12	(15)
Medal record
European Championship
Silver medal – second place	2020 Sweden/Austria/Norway

Vlado Matanović (born 29 May 1995) is a Croatian handball player who plays for HC PPD Zagreb and the Croatian national team.

He represented Croatia at the 2020 European Men's Handball Championship.
