= Leon Šušnja =

Croatian handball player (born 1993)

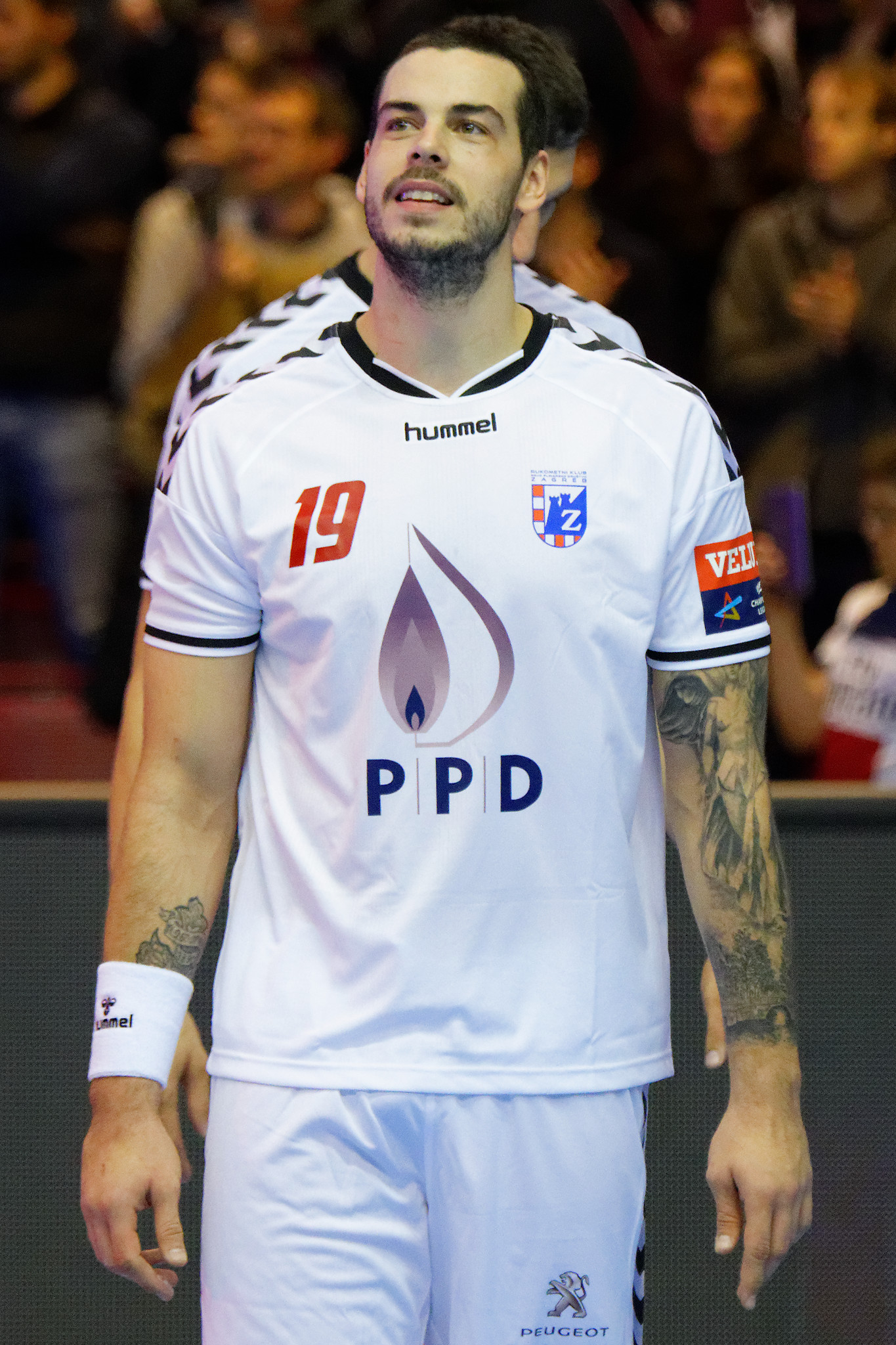

Personal information
- Nationality: Croatian
- Born: 5 August 1993 (age 33) Široki Brijeg, Bosnia & Hercegovina
- Height: 2.04 m (6 ft 8 in)

Sport
- Sport: Handball
- Position: Pivot
- Current club: Wisła Płock
- Number: 19

Youth career
- Years: Team
- –: RK Moslavina
- –: RK Novska

Senior clubs
- Years: Team
- 2013–2019: RK Zagreb
- 2019–: Wisła Płock
National team
Years	Team	Apps	(Gls)
2018–	Croatia	49	(24)
Medal record
World Championship
Silver medal – second place	2025 Croatia/Denmark/Norway
European Championship
Bronze medal – third place	2026 Denmark/Norway/Sweden
Mediterranean Games
Gold medal – first place	2018 Tarragona	Team
- Updated on 2 February 2026

Leon Šušnja (born 5 August 1993) is a Croatian handball player for Wisła Płock and the Croatian national team.

He represented Croatia at the 2023 World Men's Handball Championship.
