= Zvonimir Bilić =

Croatian handball player and coach (born 1971)

Personal information
- Nationality: Croatian
- Born: 22 September 1971 (age 55) Livno, SFR Yugoslavia

Sport
- Sport: Handball
- Position: Right back

Senior clubs
- Years: Team
- 1987–1988: RK Dugo Selo
- 1988–1990: RK Novi Zagreb
- 1990–1993: RK Coning Medveščak
- 1994–1999: RK Badel 1862 Zagreb
- 2000–2002: Valencia
- 2002–2003: Papillon Conversamo
- 2003–2004: Wilhelmshavener HV
- 2004–2005: RK Zagreb
- 2005–2007: RK Agram Medveščak
National team
Years	Team	Apps	(Gls)
1993–2002	Croatia	147	(500)

Teams managed
- 2007–2008: RK CO Zagreb) (Youth)
- 2008–2009: RK Dubrava
- 2009–2010: RK Medveščak NFD
- 2011–2014: RK Dugo Selo
Medal record
Men's handball
Representing Croatia
World Championship
Silver medal – second place	1995 Iceland	Team competition
European Championship
Bronze medal – third place	1994 Portugal	Team competition
Mediterranean Games
Gold medal – first place	2001 Tunis	Team competition

Zvonimir Bilić (born 22 September 1971) is a former Croatian handball player and coach.

He played for the national team of Croatia.

== Honours ==
Medveščak Zagreb

- Limburgse Handbal Dagen (1): 1993
- Croatian First A League Runner-up (1): 1992–93
- Croatian Cup Finalist (3): 1992, 1993, 2006

Zagreb

- Croatian First A League (7): 1993–94, 1994–95, 1995–96, 1996–97, 1997–98, 1998–99, 2004–2005
- Croatian Cup (7): 1994, 1995, 1996, 1997, 1998, 1999, 2005
- EHF Champions League Finalist (4): 1994–95, 1996–97, 1997–98, 1998–99
- EHF Cup Winners' Cup Finalist (1): 2005

Conversano

- Serie A (1): 2002–03
- Coppa Italia (1): 2003

Individual

- Greatest sportsperson of the city of Dugo Selo in the 20th century – 2001
- 9th top goalscorer for Croatia national team

=== Orders ===
- Order of Danica Hrvatska with face of Franjo Bučar – 1995
