= Veron Načinović =

Croatian handball player (born 2000)

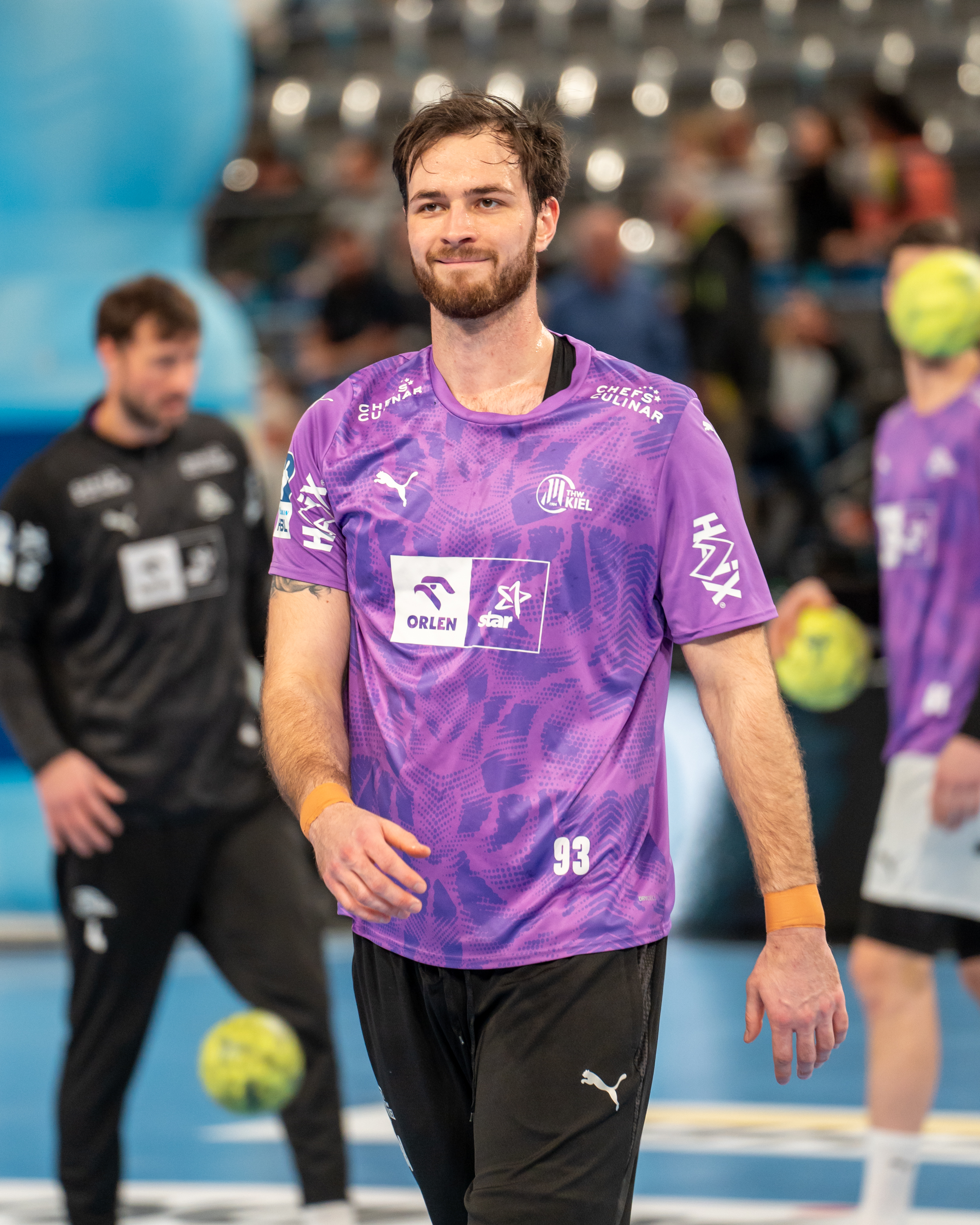
- 2026

Personal information
- Nationality: Croatian
- Born: 7 March 2000 (age 26) Rijeka, Croatia
- Height: 2.03 m (6 ft 8 in)

Sport
- Sport: Handball
- Position: Line player
- Current club: THW Kiel
- Number: 93

Youth career
- Years: Team
- –: RK Zamet

Senior clubs
- Years: Team
- 2015–2020: RK Zamet
- 2020–2021: RK Celje
- 2021–2025: Montpellier Handball
- 2025–: THW Kiel
National team
Years	Team	Apps	(Gls)
2021–	Croatia	53	(197)
Medal record
World Championship
Silver medal – second place	2025 Croatia/Denmark/Norway
European Championship
Bronze medal – third place	2026 Denmark/Norway/Sweden
- Updated on 2 February 2026

Veron Načinović (born 7 March 2000) is a Croatian handball player who plays for THW Kiel .

He is the son of former handball player Alvaro Načinović.
