= Josip Milković =

Croatian handball player and coach (1942–2026)

Personal information
- Nationality: Yugoslavia; Croatia
- Born: 30 October 1942 Zagreb, Independent State of Croatia
- Died: 8 June 2026 (aged 83)

Sport
- Sport: Handball

Senior clubs
- Years: Team
- 1957–1973: RK Medveščak
National team
Years	Team	Apps	(Gls)
–	Yugoslavia	103	(310)

Teams managed
- 1990–1991: Croatia
- 2000–2002: Croatia
Medal record
Men's handball
Representing Yugoslavia
World Championship
Gold medal – first place	1970 France	Team

Josip Milković (30 October 1942 – 8 June 2026), nicknamed "Ćos", was a Croatian handball player and coach. He played in 103 matches for the Yugoslavia men's national handball team, and competed at the 1970 World Men's Handball Championship, winning the bronze medal. Aside from his playing career, he served as coach of the Croatia men's national handball team from 1990 to 1991 and again from 2000 to 2002.

Milković died on 8 June 2026, at the age of 83.
