= Zlatko Žagmešter =

Croatian handball player (1943–2026)

Zlatko Žagmešter (6 July 1943 – 29 July 2026) was a Croatian handball player, considered to be among the greatest handball players of the 1960s and 1970s.

== Career ==
Playing for Dinamo, Medveščak, Zagreb, Solingen and Mulhouse, Žagmešter scored around 5,000 goals in his professional career. Žagmešter played for the Yugoslav national team, with whom he won a bronze medal at the 1970 World Championship. He was also the youngest player to play for Yugoslavia in an official match (at the age of 19).

Žagmešter died on 29 July 2026, at the age of 83.

== Acknowledgements ==
Žagmešter was named "the greatest young hope" by Rude Pravo and member of the all-star team of the 1964 World Championship by Československy sport.

In 2023, he was awarded the Franjo Bučar State Award for Sport and the Matija Ljubek Award of the Croatian Olympic Committee for life achievement.
