= Stjepan Obran =

Croatian handball player (born 1956)

Personal information
- Nationality: Croatian
- Born: 2 August 1956 (age 69); Koprivnica, Yugoslavia

Sport
- Sport: Handball

Stjepan Obran (born 2 August 1956) is a Croatian handball player. He competed in the men's tournament at the 1980 Summer Olympics.
