= Schleuderball =

Sport originated in Northwest Germany

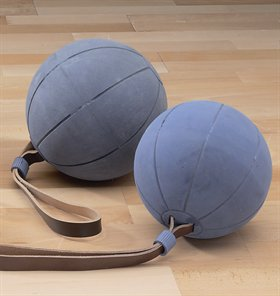
Schleuderbälle

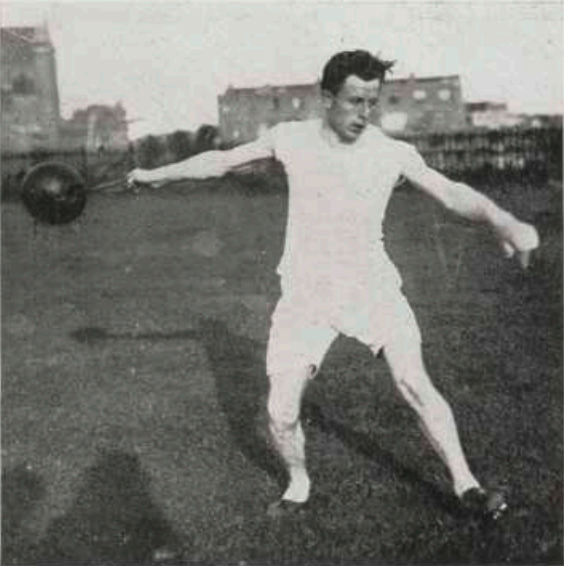
Schleuderball in the Netherlands (1922)

Schleuderball is a sport that originated in the Northwest Germany. It is played by two teams consisting of anywhere from two to eight players. The object of the game is to throw the ball into the opponents end zone. The game is played on a field that is 100-meters long by 15-meters wide (in the United States yards may be substituted for meters). The Schleuderball itself is a 1.5 kilogram leather ball with an attached strap. The primary throw, called a schleuder, is performed by swinging the ball around by the strap, gaining centrifugal force, and releasing in the direction of the opponent's goal. A different type of throw, called a shock, can be thrown by the player who catches an opponent's throw. The two teams alternate schleuders back and forth until one team gets the ball to land inbounds beyond the opponent's goal line.

== Rules ==
The playing field is 100-meters long by 15-meters wide. The first team to throw starts at their own 30-meter line. Their first player throws (or schleuders) the ball by swinging it from the strap and releasing towards the opponent's end of the field. The opposing team waits at their own 30-meter line and cannot advance past it until the first thrower releases the ball. Once the first team releases the ball, the opposing team can move forward to stop its forward progress. If the ball is not caught by the opposing team, then the advancement of the ball ends at either (1) the point at which the ball stops in bounds, (2) the point at which the ball, untouched by the defense, crosses the side boundary line, or (3) the point at which the ball, already touched by the defense, stops out of bounds. The point at which the ball's advancement ends becomes the "line of schleuder," and is where the opposing team takes possession.

If the ball is caught by the defensive team, then the player who caught the ball can throw the ball forward without using the strap. This throw is called a "shock." The point at which the shock is stopped by the original offense is the new line of schleuder for the team who just threw the shock. If a shock throw lands out of bounds, the throw does not count, and the line of schleuder moves back to the point of the catch. The original offense can also catch the shock and throw a return shock the opposite way. This sequence can continue until a maximum of three shocks are thrown. If the third consecutive shock is caught, the throw is voided and the ball is placed at the spot from which the third shock was thrown. The point at which the shock throws stop is the new line of schleuder, and possession transfers to the team who defended the previous schleuder.

Each team must maintain a sequential order (like a batting order in baseball) for their schleuders. A player can only throw a schleuder at their set turn. Shocks, on the other hand, are thrown by the player who catches the ball. After a shock is thrown, the schleuder order resumes as normal.

Goals are scored by landing the ball in the opponents goal. The goal starts at the end of the 100-meter field, and continues indefinitely. The ball must land within the 15-meter side boundaries. One point is scored when a team lands the ball in the goal on their schleuder. Two points are scored if the ball lands in the goal on a shock, including a return shock after a first shock is caught. This is called a shock-point.

Various methods are used to measure the length of a game. The most popular method is to play two halves of fixed times. The team with the highest score at the end of the game is the winner.

== History ==
The game of Schleuderball originated in Northwest Germany. Scott Seeger, a former German professor at the University of Kansas, is credited with introducing the game to the United States. The game has been played in the United States at the University of Kansas, Western Kentucky University, Lewis and Clark Law School, Kettering University, and Knoxville, Tennessee. It is also played at Olathe East High School, Olathe South High School, and Olathe Northwest High School in Olathe, Kansas.
