= Željko Nimš =

Croatian handball player (born 1950)

Personal information
- Full name: Željko Nimš
- Nationality: Croatian
- Born: 22 April 1950 (age 76) Sisak, SFR Yugoslavia

Sport
- Sport: Handball
- Position: Goalkeeper

Senior clubs
- Years: Team
- 1967–1982: Partizan Bjelovar
- 1985–1986: Pallamano Trieste
National team
- Years: Team
- 1973–1978: Yugoslavia
Medal record
Representing Yugoslavia
World Championship
Bronze medal – third place	1974 East Germany	Team competition

Željko Nimš (born 22 April 1950) is a Croatian handball player who competed in the 1976 Summer Olympics for Yugoslavia.

In 1976 he was part of the Yugoslav team which finished fifth in the Olympic tournament. He played three matches.

He was a part of RK Bjelovar squad (at the time called Partizan) that won European Champions's Cup against West German squad VfL Gummersbach, in a game played in Dortmund.

== Honours ==
Partizan Bjelovar

- Yugoslav First League (6): 1967–68, 1969–70, 1970–71, 1971–72, 1976–77, 1978–79
- Yugoslav Cup (2): 1968, 1976
- European Champions Cup (1): 1971–72

Pallamano Trieste

- Serie A (1): 1985-86

Yugoslavia

- 1974 World Championship - 3rd place
- 1976 Summer Olympics - 5th place
- 1978 World Championship - 4th place
