= Matej Ašanin =

Croatian handball player (born 1993)

Personal information
- Nationality: Croatian
- Born: 4 September 1993 (age 33) Zagreb, Croatia
- Height: 2.06 m (6 ft 9 in)

Sport
- Sport: Handball
- Position: Goalkeeper
- Current club: Beşiktaş Istanbul
National team
Years	Team	Apps	(Gls)
–	Croatia	16	(0)
Medal record
European Championship
Silver medal – second place	2020 Sweden/Austria/Norway
Mediterranean Games
Gold medal – first place	2018 Tarragona	Team
- Updated on 29 October 2024

Matej Ašanin (born 4 September 1993) is a Croatian handball player who plays for Beşiktaş Istanbul in Turkey and the Croatian national team.

He represented Croatia at the 2020 European Men's Handball Championship, where he won silver medals with the Croatian team.
