= Zdravko Miljak =

Croatian handball player (born 1950)

Olympic medal record

Men's Handball
Gold medal – first place	1972 Munich	Team competition

Zdravko Miljak (born 11 September 1950) is a Croatian handball player who competed for Yugoslavia in the 1972 Summer Olympics and in the 1976 Summer Olympics.

He was born in Vinkovci, PR Croatia, FPR Yugoslavia.

In 1972 he was part of the Yugoslav team which won the gold medal at the Munich Games. He played all six matches and scored seven goals.

Four years later he was a member of the Yugoslav team which finished fifth in the Olympic tournament. He played all six matches and scored 30 goals.
