= Tonči Peribonio =

Croatian handball player (born 1960)

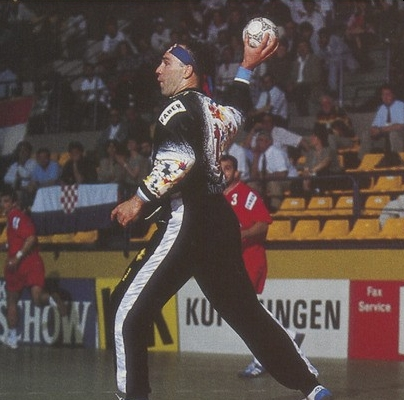
- Peribonio in 1994

Personal information
- Full name: Tonči Peribonio
- Nationality: Croatian
- Born: 3 May 1960 (age 66) Slavonski Brod, FPR Yugoslavia

Sport
- Sport: Handball
- Position: Goalkeeper

Senior clubs
- Years: Team
- 1977–1986: RK Krivaja Zavidovići
- 1986–1991: Zamet
- 1991–1992: Gáldar Tres de Mayo
- 1992–1994: Badel 1862 Zagreb
- 1994–1997: Solin Transportcommerce
- 1997–1999: RK Split Brodomerkur
- 1999–2009: SG Pforzheim/Eutingen
National team
Years	Team		
1978–1979	Yugoslavia U-21		
1989–1991	Yugoslavia	100	(0)
1991–1994	Croatia	39	(0)

Teams managed
- 2009–2010: SG Pforzheim/Eutingen
- 2012–present: TSG Ketsch 1902 (GK coach)
Medal record
Representing Yugoslavia
Men's handball
U-21 World Championship
Silver medal – second place	1979 Denmark & Sweden	Team
Representing Croatia
European Championship
Bronze medal – third place	1994 Portugal	Team
Mediterranean Games
Gold medal – first place	1993 Languedoc-Roussillon	Team

Tonči Peribonio (born 3 May 1960) is a Croatian former handball goalkeeper. He is currently a goalkeeper coach at TSG Ketsch.

== Career ==
Peribonio started his career at RK Krivaja Zavidovići. After nine years at the club he moved to RK Zamet and helped them get promoted to the Yugoslav First League. During 1991 Peribonio moved from Zamet to Spanish club Gáldar Tres de Mayo where he spent a season before moving to RK Zagreb.

In 1997 Peribonio moved to Split Brodomerkur where he spent two seasons as captain before moving to Germany. He played in the EHF Cup with the club in 1997-98 and 1998-99.

== Honours ==
RK Zamet

- Yugoslav Second League (north) (1): 1986-87

RK Zagreb Loto/Banka/Badel 1862

- Croatian First A League (2): 1992-93, 1993–94
- Croatian Cup (2): 1993, 1994
- European Champions Cup (1): 1992-93
- European Super Cup (1): 1993

Solin Transportcommerce

- Croatian First B League (1): 1996-97

== Orders ==
- Order of Danica Hrvatska with face of Franjo Bučar - 1995
