= Veselin Vuković =

Serbian handball player (born 1958)

- Vuković in 2012

Personal information
- Full name: Veselin Vuković
- Nationality: Serbian
- Born: 19 December 1958 (age 67) Struga, FPR Yugoslavia
- Height: 1.92 m (6 ft 4 in)

Sport
- Sport: Handball
- Position: Pivot
- Current club: Metaloplastika (head coach)

Youth career
- Years: Team
- –: Metaloplastika

Senior clubs
- Years: Team
- 1975–1986: Metaloplastika
- 1986–1990: Atlético Madrid
- 1991: Helados Alacant
- 1991–1993: Barcelona
National team
Years	Team	Apps	(Gls)
–	Yugoslavia	116	(346)

Teams managed
- –: Metaloplastika
- 2000: FR Yugoslavia (assistant)
- 2003–2005: Serbia and Montenegro (assistant)
- 2010–2013: Serbia
- 2015–2016: Metaloplastika
- 2018: Mokra Gora
- 2019–: Metaloplastika
Medal record
Men's handball
Representing Yugoslavia
Olympic Games
Gold medal – first place	1984 Los Angeles	Team
World Championship
Gold medal – first place	1986 Switzerland	Team
Mediterranean Games
Gold medal – first place	1983 Casablanca	Team
Representing Serbia
European Championship
Silver medal – second place	2012 Serbia	Staff

Veselin Vuković (Serbian Cyrillic: Веселин Вуковић; born 19 December 1958) is a Serbian handball coach and former player who competed for Yugoslavia in the 1984 Summer Olympics.

== Club career ==
Born in Struga (PR Macedonia), Vuković moved with his family to Šabac (PR Serbia) at an early age. He started out at local club Metaloplastika, helping them win six Yugoslav Championships (1981–82, 1982–83, 1983–84, 1984–85, and 1985–86), four Yugoslav Cups (1979–80, 1982–83, 1983–84, and 1985–86), and two successive European Cups (1984–85 and 1985–86). In 1986, Vuković went abroad to Spain and spent four seasons with Atlético Madrid. He also briefly played for Helados Alacant, before joining European champions Barcelona in 1991.

== International career ==
At international level, Vuković represented Yugoslavia at the 1984 Summer Olympics in Los Angeles, winning the gold medal. He was also a regular member of the team that won the 1986 World Championship in Switzerland.

== Coaching career ==
Vuković served as an assistant to FR Yugoslavia head coach Veselin Vujović at the 2000 Summer Olympics. He performed the same role for two years while Vujović was head coach of Serbia and Montenegro.

On 1 April 2010, Vuković was appointed as head coach for Serbia. He led them to the final of the 2012 European Championship, which they lost to Denmark.

== Honours ==
=== Player ===
Metaloplastika

- Yugoslav Handball Championship: 1981–82, 1982–83, 1983–84, 1984–85, 1985–86
- Yugoslav Handball Cup: 1979–80, 1982–83, 1983–84, 1985–86
- European Cup: 1984–85, 1985–86

Atlético Madrid

- Copa del Rey: 1986–87

Barcelona

- Liga ASOBAL: 1991–92
- Copa del Rey: 1992–93

=== Coach ===
Metaloplastika

- Serbian Handball Cup: 2015–16
