= Zlatko Portner =

Serbian handball player (1962–2020)

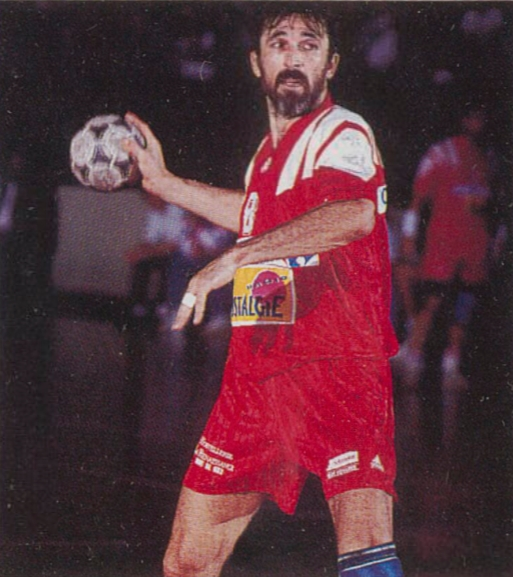

Personal information
- Full name: Zlatko Portner
- Nationality: Serbian / Swiss
- Born: 16 January 1962 Ruma, FPR Yugoslavia
- Died: 23 September 2020 (aged 58) Switzerland
- Height: 1.90 m (6 ft 3 in)

Sport
- Sport: Handball
- Position: Centre back

Youth career
- Years: Team
- –: Sloga Hrtkovci

Senior clubs
- Years: Team
- –: Crvenka
- 1982–1989: Metaloplastika
- 1989–1992: Barcelona
- 1992–1994: Vénissieux Rhône-Alpes
- –: BSV Bern
- –: TV Zofingen
- 2002–2003: BSC Grosshöchstetten
National team
Years	Team	Apps	(Gls)
–	Yugoslavia	98	(355)

Teams managed
- –: BSV Bern
- –: BSC Grosshöchstetten
- –: Espace Handball
Medal record
Men's handball
Representing Yugoslavia
Olympic Games
Bronze medal – third place	1988 Seoul	Team
World Championship
Gold medal – first place	1986 Switzerland	Team

Zlatko Portner (Serbian Cyrillic: Златко Портнер; 16 January 1962 – 23 September 2020) was a Serbian handball coach and player who won the 1986 World Championship. He also competed for Yugoslavia in the 1988 Summer Olympics.

== Club career ==
After playing for Crvenka, Portner joined Yugoslav champions Metaloplastika, becoming a member of the squad that won consecutive European Cup titles (1984–85 and 1985–86). He also won six consecutive national championships with the club.

During the 1989–90 season, Portner joined Barcelona as a replacement for his compatriot Milan Kalina. He reunited with his former Metaloplastika teammate Veselin Vujović, helping the club win the European Cup in 1991. The next year, Portner went to France and spent two seasons with Vénissieux Rhône-Alpes (1992–1994). He later also played for Swiss teams BSV Bern, TV Zofingen, and BSC Grosshöchstetten.

== International career ==
At international level, Portner represented Yugoslavia in two World Championships, winning the 1986 edition in his debut appearance. He was also a member of the team that won the bronze medal at the 1988 Summer Olympics.

== Coaching career ==
While playing in Switzerland, Portner started his coaching career with BSV Bern. He also served as head coach of several other Swiss teams.

== Personal life ==
Portner was the father of fellow handball player Nikola Portner, who represents Switzerland internationally.

== Honours ==
Metaloplastika

- Yugoslav Handball Championship: 1982–83, 1983–84, 1984–85, 1985–86, 1986–87, 1987–88
- Yugoslav Handball Cup: 1982–83, 1983–84, 1985–86
- European Cup: 1984–85, 1985–86

Barcelona

- Liga ASOBAL: 1989–90, 1990–91, 1991–92
- European Cup: 1990–91
