= Jasmin Mrkonja =

Yugoslav handball player

Personal information
- Full name: Jasmin Mrkonja
- Nationality: Bosnian
- Born: 9 October 1958 (age 68) Zavidovići, FPR Yugoslavia
- Height: 178 cm (70 in)

Sport
- Sport: Handball
- Position: Right winger

Youth career
- Years: Team
- 1971–1978: Krivaja Zavidovići

Senior clubs
- Years: Team
- 1978–1983: Krivaja Zavidovići
- 1983–1987: Metaloplastika
National team
- Years: Team
- –: Yugoslavia

Teams managed
- 2003–2004: Bosnia and Herzegovina
Medal record
Representing Yugoslavia
Men's handball
IHF World Men's Handball Championship
| Gold medal – first place | 1986 Switzerland | Team |

Jasmin Mrkonja (born 9 October 1958) is a Bosnian retired professional handball player and former coach.

== Playing career ==
Mrkonja started playing handball at hometown club Krivaja Zavidovići. He then joined Yugoslav giants Metaloplastika in 1983, staying there until 1987 and winning many major trophies during that period. Later he played for Sporting Club Gaeta in Italy.

Mrkonja represented Yugoslavia in the men's tournament at the 1980 Summer Olympics and was also part of the Yugoslav team that were crowned World Champions in 1986, beating Hungary in the final 24-22.

== Coaching career ==
Mrkonja was head coach of the Bosnia and Herzegovina national handball team from 2003 until 2004.

== Honours ==
=== Player ===
Metaloplastika

- Yugoslav Handball Championship: 1983–84, 1984–85, 1985–86, 1986–87
- Yugoslav Handball Cup: 1983–84, 1985–86
- EHF Champions League: 1984–85, 1985–86

Yugoslavia

- IHF World Men's Handball Championship: 1986
