= Abas Arslanagić =

Bosnian handball player (born 1944)

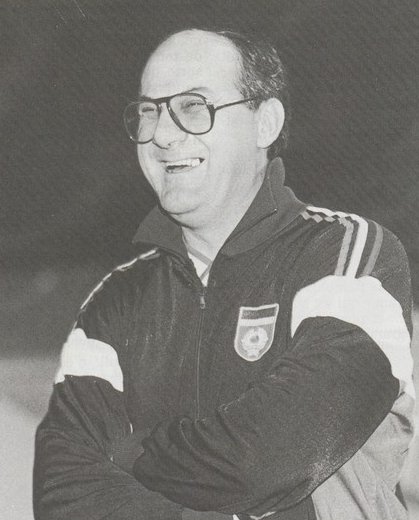

Personal information
- Born: October 2, 1944 (age 82) Derventa, Independent State of Croatia

Sport
- Sport: Handball
- Position: Goalkeeper

Youth career
- Years: Team
- 1958–1962: Partizan Derventa

Senior clubs
- Years: Team
- 1962–1963: Partizan
- 1963–1976: Borac Banja Luka
- 1976–1977: TuS Nettelstedt-Lübbecke
National team
| Years | Team | Apps | (Gls) |
| 1969–1978 | Yugoslavia | 125 | (1) |

Teams managed
- 1972–1978: Borac Banja Luka (youth)
- 1978–1980: RK Bosnamontaža
- 1981: Yugoslavia U21
- 1982–1986: Yugoslavia (GK coach)
- 1986–1988: Yugoslavia
- 1987–1988: Metaloplastika
- 1988–1990: Benfica
- 1988–1994: Qatar
- 1995–1996: Croatia
- 1995–1996: Badel 1862 Zagreb
- 1996–1998: RK Krško
- 1998–2000: Celje Pivovarna Laško
- 2000–2001: RK Zvečevo
- 2001–2002: SG Handball West Wien
- 2002–2003: Bosna Sarajevo
- 2002–2003: Bosnia and Herzegovina; ŽRK Lokomotiva Zagreb
- 2004–2005: Medveščak Infosistem
- 2005: Borac Banja Luka
- 2006–2008: Qatar U21
Medal record
Men's handball
Olympic Games
| Gold medal – first place | 1972 Munich | Player |
| Gold medal – first place | 1984 Los Angeles | GK coach |
| Bronze medal – third place | 1988 Seoul | Coach |
World Championship
| Bronze medal – third place | 1970 France | Player |
| Bronze medal – third place | 1974 East Germany | Player |
| Gold medal – first place | 1986 Switzerland | GK coach |
Mediterranean Games
| Gold medal – first place | 1975 Algeria | Player |
IHF U-21 World Championship
| Gold medal – first place | 1981 Portugal | Coach |

Abas Arslanagić (born October 2, 1944) is a Bosnian former handball player and coach who competed for Yugoslavia in the 1972 Summer Olympics and in the 1976 Summer Olympics.

In 1972, he was part of the Yugoslav team which won the gold medal at the Munich Games. He played five matches including the final as goalkeeper.

Four years later, he was a member of the Yugoslav team which finished fifth in the Olympic tournament. He played all six matches as goalkeeper.

In 2013, Arslanagić retired from coaching.

== Honours ==
Player
Borac Banja Luka

- Yugoslav First League: 1972-73, 1973–74, 1974–75, 1975–76
- Yugoslav Cup: 1969, 1972, 1973, 1974, 1975
- European Champions Cup: 1975-76

Yugoslavia

- 1970 World Championship third place
- 1972 Summer Olympics first place
- 1974 World Championship third place
- 1975 Mediterranean Games first place
- 1976 Summer Olympics fifth place

Coach
Metaloplastika

- Yugoslav First League: 1987-88

Qatar

- 1989 Asian Championship sixth place
- 1991 Asian Championship fourth place
- 1993 Asian Championship seventh place

Benfica

- Portuguese First Division: 1988-89, 1989-1990
- Portuguese Super Cup: 1989

Zagreb

- Croatian First A League: 1995-96
- Croatian Cup: 1996

Celje

- Slovenian First League: 1998-99, 1999-00
- Slovenian Cup: 1999, 2000

Bosna Sarajevo

- First League of Bosnia and Herzegovina: 2002-03
- Handball Cup of Bosnia and Herzegovina: 2003
