= National team appearances in the World Men's Handball Championship =

This article lists the performances of each of the 58 national teams which have made at least one appearance in the IHF World Men's Handball Championship finals.

== Debut of teams ==
Year	Debutants	Total
1938	Austria, Denmark, Germany, Sweden	4
1954	Czechoslovakia, France, Switzerland	3
1958	Brazil, Finland, Hungary, Iceland, Luxembourg, Norway, Poland, Romania, Spain, Yugoslavia	10
1961	Japan, Netherlands	2
1964	Egypt, East Germany, Soviet Union, United States	4
1967	Canada, Tunisia	2
1970	No debut nations	0
1974	Algeria, Bulgaria	2
1978	No debut nations	0
1982	Cuba, Kuwait	2
1986	South Korea	1
1990	No debut nations	0
1993	Russia*	0(+1)
1995	Belarus, Croatia, Czech Republic*, Morocco, Slovenia	4(+1)
1997	Argentina, China, Italy, Lithuania, Saudi Arabia, FR Yugoslavia*	5(+1)
1999	Australia, Macedonia, Nigeria, Portugal	4
2001	Greenland, Ukraine	2
2003	Qatar	1
2005	Angola, Greece	2
2007	No debut nations	0
2009	Serbia*, Slovakia*	0(+2)
2011	Bahrain, Chile	2
2013	Montenegro	1
2015	Bosnia and Herzegovina, Iran	2
2017	No debut nations	0
2019	Korea**	0(+1)
2021	Cape Verde, DR Congo, Uruguay	3
2023	Belgium	1
2025	Guinea	1
2027	Faroe Islands, Turkey	2

* Successor Teams

** Composed of players from both South Korea and North Korea. The team split into two again after the tournament.

== Participation details ==
Legend

- 1st – Champions
- 2nd – Runners-up
- 3rd – Third place
- 4th – Fourth place
- 5th – Fifth place
- 6th – Sixth place
- 7th – Seventh place
- 8th – Eighth place
- 9th – Ninth place
- 10th – Tenth place
- 11th – Eleventh place
- 12th to 24th – Twelfth to twenty-fourth place
- Q — Qualified for upcoming tournament
- •• — Qualified but withdrew
- • — Did not qualify
- × — Did not enter / Withdrew from the World Championship / Banned
- — Hosts

Team	(Germany); 1938	(Sweden); 1954	(East Germany); 1958	(West Germany); 1961	(Czechoslovakia); 1964	(Sweden); 1967	(France); 1970	(East Germany); 1974	(Denmark); 1978	(West Germany); 1982	(Switzerland); 1986	(Czechoslovakia); 1990	(Sweden); 1993	(Iceland); 1995	(Japan); 1997	(Egypt); 1999	(France); 2001	(Portugal); 2003	(Tunisia); 2005	(Germany); 2007	(Croatia); 2009	(Sweden); 2011	(Spain); 2013	(Qatar); 2015	(France); 2017	(Denmark) (Germany); 2019	(Egypt); 2021	(Poland) (Sweden); 2023	(Croatia) (Denmark) (Norway); 2025	(Germany); 2027	(France) (Germany); 2029	(Denmark) (Iceland) (Norway); 2031	Total
Algeria	Part of France				×	×	×	15th	•	16th	16th	16th	•	16th	17th	15th	13th	18th	17th	•	19th	15th	17th	24th	•	•	22nd	31st	30th	Q			18
Angola	Part of Portugal								•	•	•	•	×	×	×	•	×	•	20th	21st	•	•	•	•	24th	23rd	30th	•	•	Q			6
Argentina	×	×	×	×	×	×	×	•	•	•	•	•	•	•	22nd	21st	15th	17th	18th	16th	18th	12th	18th	12th	18th	17th	11th	19th	20th	Q			16
Australia	×	×	×	×	×	×	×	×	•	•	•	•	•	•	•	24th	•	21st	24th	24th	24th	24th	24th	•	×	•	•	•	×	•			7
Austria	2nd	×	11th	•	•	•	•	•	•	•	•	•	14th	•	•	•	•	•	•	•	•	18th	•	13th	•	19th	26th	•	17th	•			8
Bahrain	Part of Great Britain							×	•	•	•	•	•	•	•	•	•	•	•	•	•	23rd	•	••	23rd	20th	21st	16th	29th	Q			7
Belarus	Part of Soviet Union												•	9th	•	•	•	•	•	•	•	•	15th	18th	11th	•	17th	×	×	×			5
Belgium	×	×	×	×	×	×	×	×	•	•	•	•	•	•	•	•	•	•	•	•	•	•	•	•	•	•	•	21st	•	•			1
Bosnia and Herzegovina	Part of Yugoslavia												•	•	•	•	•	•	•	•	•	•	•	20th	•	•	•	•	•	•			1
Brazil	×	×	15th	×	×	×	×	•	•	•	•	•	•	24th	24th	16th	19th	22nd	19th	19th	21st	21st	13th	16th	16th	9th	18th	17th	7th	Q			18
Bulgaria	×	×	×	×	×	×	•	11th	14th	•	•	•	•	•	•	•	•	•	•	•	•	•	•	•	•	•	•	•	×	×			2
Canada	×	×	×	×	•	16th	•	×	15th	•	•	•	•	•	•	•	•	•	23rd	•	•	•	•	•	•	•	•	×	•	•			3
Cape Verde	Part of Portugal								×	×	×	×	×	×	×	×	×	×	×	×	×	×	×	×	×	×	32nd	23rd	23rd	Q			4
Chile	×	×	×	×	×	×	×	×	•	•	•	•	•	•	•	•	•	•	•	•	•	22nd	23rd	23rd	21st	16th	27th	26th	24th	Q			9
China	×	×	×	×	×	×	×	×	•	•	•	•	•	•	20th	20th	•	•	•	•	•	•	•	•	•	•	•	×	•	•			2
Croatia	Part of Yugoslavia												•	2nd	13th	10th	9th	1st	2nd	5th	2nd	5th	3rd	6th	4th	6th	15th	9th	2nd	Q			17
Cuba	×	×	×	×	×	×	×	×	•	13th	15th	14th	•	13th	14th	8th	•	×	×	×	20th	•	×	×	×	×	×	•	32nd	×			8
Czech Republic	See Czechoslovakia													8th	11th	•	18th	•	10th	12th	•	•	•	17th	•	•	••	•	19th	•			7
Denmark	4th	5th	4th	5th	7th	2nd	4th	8th	4th	4th	7th	•	9th	19th	•	9th	•	9th	13th	3rd	4th	2nd	2nd	5th	10th	1st	1st	1st	1st	Q		Q	27
DR Congo	×	×	×	×	×	×	×	×	•	×	×	×	•	×	×	×	•	•	•	•	•	•	•	•	•	•	28th	•	•	×			1
Egypt	×	×	×	×	14th	×	×	×	•	•	•	•	12th	6th	6th	7th	4th	15th	14th	17th	14th	14th	16th	14th	13th	8th	7th	7th	5th	Q			19
Faroe Islands	×	×	×	×	×	×	×	×	×	•	•	×	×	×	×	×	×	×	×	×	•	•	×	×	×	•	•	•	•	Q			1
Finland	×	•	14th	•	•	•	•	×	•	•	•	•	•	•	•	•	•	•	•	•	•	•	•	•	•	•	•	•	•	•			1
France	×	6th	9th	8th	13th	10th	12th	•	16th	•	•	9th	2nd	1st	3rd	6th	1st	3rd	3rd	4th	1st	1st	6th	1st	1st	3rd	4th	2nd	3rd	Q	Q		27
Germany (including West Germany)	1st	2nd	3rd	4th	4th	6th	5th	9th	1st	7th	7th	•	6th	4th	•	5th	8th	2nd	9th	1st	5th	11th	5th	7th	9th	4th	12th	5th	6th	Q	Q		29
Greece	×	×	×	×	×	×	×	×	•	•	•	•	•	•	•	•	•	•	6th	•	•	•	•	•	•	•	•	•	•	Q			2
Greenland	×	×	×	×	×	×	×	×	•	•	•	•	•	•	•	•	20th	24th	•	22nd	•	•	•	•	•	•	•	•	•	•			3
Guinea	×	×	×	×	×	×	×	×	×	•	×	×	×	×	×	×	×	×	×	×	×	×	×	×	×	×	•	•	31st	•			1
Hungary	×	•	7th	•	8th	8th	8th	7th	9th	9th	2nd	6th	11th	17th	4th	11th	•	6th	•	9th	6th	7th	8th	•	7th	10th	5th	8th	8th	•			23
Iceland	×	×	10th	6th	9th	•	11th	14th	13th	•	6th	10th	8th	14th	5th	•	11th	7th	15th	8th	•	6th	12th	11th	14th	11th	20th	12th	9th	Q		Q	25
Iran	×	×	×	×	×	×	×	×	•	•	•	•	•	•	•	•	•	•	•	•	•	•	•	21st	•	•	•	24th	•	•			2
Italy	×	×	×	×	×	×	×	•	•	•	•	•	•	•	18th	•	•	•	•	•	•	•	•	•	•	•	•	•	16th	Q			3
Japan	×	×	×	12th	16th	11th	10th	12th	12th	14th	•	15th	•	23rd	15th	•	•	•	16th	•	•	16th	•	•	22nd	24th	19th	×	28th	Q			17
Kuwait	×	×	×	×	×	×	×	×	•	15th	•	•	•	20th	•	19th	23rd	20th	22nd	19th	22nd	•	•	•	•	•	•	•	27th	Q			10
Lithuania	Part of Soviet Union												•	•	10th	•	•	•	•	•	•	•	•	•	•	•	•	•	•	•			1
Luxembourg	×	×	16th	•	•	×	•	•	•	•	•	•	•	•	•	•	•	•	•	•	•	•	•	•	•	•	•	•	•	•			1
Montenegro	Part of Yugoslavia												Part of Serbia and Montenegro							•	•	•	22nd	•	•	•	•	18th	•	•			2
Morocco	(France) / (Spain)		×	×	×	×	•	×	•	×	×	•	•	22nd	23rd	17th	22nd	23rd	•	20th	•	•	•	•	•	•	29th	30th	•	•			8
Netherlands	×	×	×	11th	×	•	•	•	•	•	•	•	•	•	•	•	•	•	•	•	•	•	•	•	•	•	•	14th	12th	•			3
Nigeria	×	×	×	×	×	×	×	×	•	•	•	×	×	×	•	23rd	×	•	×	•	•	•	×	•	•	•	•	•	•	•			1
North Macedonia	Part of Yugoslavia												•	•	•	18th	•	•	•	•	11th	•	14th	9th	15th	15th	23rd	27th	15th	Q			10
Norway	×	•	6th	7th	11th	13th	13th	•	•	•	•	•	13th	•	12th	13th	14th	•	7th	13th	9th	9th	•	•	2nd	2nd	6th	6th	10th	Q		Q	20
Poland	×	×	5th	•	•	12th	14th	4th	6th	3rd	14th	11th	•	•	•	•	•	10th	•	2nd	3rd	8th	9th	3rd	17th	•	13th	15th	25th	Q			19
Portugal	×	×	×	•	×	×	•	•	•	•	•	•	•	•	19th	•	16th	12th	•	•	•	•	•	•	•	•	10th	13th	4th	Q			7
Qatar	Part of Great Britain							×	•	•	•	•	•	•	•	•	•	16th	21st	23rd	•	•	20th	2nd	8th	13th	8th	22nd	21st	Q			11
Romania	×	×	13th	1st	1st	3rd	1st	1st	7th	5th	9th	3rd	10th	10th	•	•	•	•	•	•	15th	19th	•	•	•	•	•	•	•	•			14
Russia	See Soviet Union												1st	5th	1st	2nd	6th	5th	8th	6th	16th	•	7th	19th	12th	14th	14th	×	×	×			14 (Note: Russia's total includes one appearance as Russian Handball Federation in 2021.)
Saudi Arabia	×	×	×	×	×	×	×	×	•	•	•	•	•	•	21st	22nd	21st	19th	•	•	23rd	•	19th	22nd	20th	21st	•	29th	•	•	Q		11
Serbia	Part of Yugoslavia												Part of Serbia and Montenegro							•	8th	10th	10th	•	•	18th	•	11th	•	Q			6
Slovakia	See Czechoslovakia													•	•	•	•	•	•	•	10th	17th	•	•	•	•	•	•	•	•			2
Slovenia	Part of Yugoslavia												•	18th	•	•	17th	11th	12th	10th	•	•	4th	8th	3rd	•	9th	10th	13th	Q			12
South Korea	×	×	×	×	×	×	×	×	•	•	12th	12th	15th	12th	8th	14th	12th	•	•	15th	12th	13th	21st	•	•	(Korea) S.	31st	28th	•	•			13
Spain	×	•	12th	•	•	•	•	13th	10th	8th	5th	5th	5th	11th	7th	4th	5th	4th	1st	7th	13th	3rd	1st	4th	5th	7th	3rd	3rd	18th	Q			24
Sweden	3rd	1st	1st	3rd	2nd	5th	6th	10th	8th	11th	4th	1st	3rd	3rd	2nd	1st	2nd	13th	11th	•	7th	4th	•	10th	6th	5th	2nd	4th	14th	Q			28
Switzerland	×	4th	×	10th	12th	14th	15th	•	•	12th	11th	13th	4th	7th	•	•	•	•	•	•	•	•	•	•	•	•	16th	•	11th	•			12
Tunisia	France		×	×	×	15th	×	•	•	•	•	•	•	15th	16th	12th	10th	14th	4th	11th	17th	20th	11th	15th	19th	12th	25th	25th	22nd	Q			18
Turkey	×	×	×	×	×	×	×	•	•	•	•	•	•	•	•	•	•	•	•	•	•	•	•	•	•	•	•	•	•	Q			1
Ukraine	Part of Soviet Union												•	•	•	•	7th	•	•	14th	•	•	•	•	•	•	•	•	•	•			2
United States	×	×	×	×	15th	•	16th	16th	•	•	•	•	16th	21st	•	•	24th	•	•	•	•	•	•	•	•	•	••	20th	26th	Q			9
Uruguay	×	×	×	×	×	×	×	×	•	•	•	•	•	•	•	•	•	•	•	•	•	•	•	•	•	•	24th	32nd	•	Q			3
Discontinued teams
Czechoslovakia	×	3rd	2nd	2nd	3rd	1st	7th	6th	11th	10th	13th	7th	7th	See Czech Republic																			12
East Germany	(Germany)	×	(Germany)	(Germany)	10th	9th	2nd	2nd	3rd	6th	3rd	8th	See Germany																				8
Korea	See North Korea and South Korea																									22nd	North Korea / South Korea						1
Serbia and Montenegro	Part of Yugoslavia												•	•	9th	3rd	3rd	8th	5th	See Serbia and Montenegro													5
Soviet Union	×	×	×	•	5th	4th	9th	5th	2nd	1st	10th	2nd	See Russia																				8
Yugoslavia	×	×	8th	9th	6th	7th	3rd	3rd	5th	2nd	1st	4th																					10
Total	4	6	16	12	16	16	16	16	16	16	16	16	16	24	24	24	24	24	24	24	24	24	24	24	24	24	32	32	32	32	32	32	

== Results of host nations ==
Year	Host nation	Finish
1938	Germany	Champions
1954	Sweden	Champions
1958	East Germany	Third place (as Germany)
1961	West Germany	Fourth place
1964	Czechoslovakia	Third place
1967	Sweden	Fifth place
1970	France	Twelfth place
1974	East Germany	Runners-up
1978	Denmark	Fourth place
1982	West Germany	Seventh place
1986	Switzerland	Eleventh place
1990	Czechoslovakia	Seventh place
1993	Sweden	Third place
1995	Iceland	Fourteenth place
1997	Japan	Fifteenth place
1999	Egypt	Seventh place
2001	France	Champions
2003	Portugal	Sixteenth place
2005	Tunisia	Fourth place
2007	Germany	Champions
2009	Croatia	Runners-up
2011	Sweden	Fourth place
2013	Spain	Champions
2015	Qatar	Runners-up
2017	France	Champions
2019	Denmark	Champions
2019	Germany	Fourth place
2021	Egypt	Seventh place
2023	Poland	Fifteenth place
2023	Sweden	Fourth place
2025	Croatia	Runners-up
2025	Denmark	Champions
2025	Norway	10th place
2027	Germany	TBD
2029	France	TBD
2029	Germany	TBD
2031	Denmark	TBD
2031	Iceland	TBD
2031	Norway	TBD

== Results of defending champions ==
Year	Defending champions	Finish
1938	—	—
1954	West Germany	Runners-up
1958	Sweden	Champions
1961	Sweden	Third place
1964	Romania	Champions
1967	Romania	Third place
1970	Czechoslovakia	Seventh place
1974	Romania	Champions
1978	Romania	Seventh place
1982	West Germany	Seventh place
1986	Soviet Union	Tenth place
1990	Yugoslavia	Fourth place
1993	Sweden	Third place
1995	Russia	Fifth place
1997	France	Third place
1999	Russia	Runners-up
2001	Sweden	Runners-up
2003	France	Third place
2005	Croatia	Runners-up
2007	Spain	Seventh place
2009	Germany	Fifth place
2011	France	Champions
2013	France	Sixth place
2015	Spain	Fourth place
2017	France	Champions
2019	France	Third place
2021	Denmark	Champions
2023	Denmark	Champions
2025	Denmark	Champions
2027	Denmark	TBD
2029	TBD	TBD
2031	TBD	TBD
