= Mirko Bašić =

Croatian handball player (born 1960)

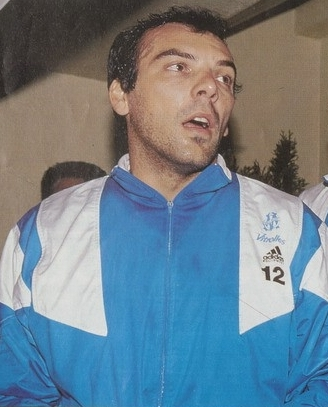
- Bašić with French club OM Vitrolles in 1993

Personal information
- Full name: Mirko Bašić
- Nationality: Croatian
- Born: 14 September 1960 (age 66) Bjelovar, FPR Yugoslavia
- Height: 1.88 m (6 ft 2 in)

Sport
- Sport: Handball
- Position: Goalkeeper
- Number: 1

Youth career
- Years: Team
- 1972–1976: Partizan Bjelovar

Senior clubs
- Years: Team
- 1976–1980: Partizan Bjelovar
- 1980–1989: Metaloplastika Šabac
- 9-12/1988: Medveščak Zagreb
- 1/1989–1991: Vénissieux Handball
- 1991–1993: OM Vitrolles
- 1996–2001: Badel 1862 Zagreb
- 2001–2002: Medveščak Infosistem
- 2002: Zagreb
- 2003: Fotex Veszprém
National team
Years	Team	Apps	(Gls)
1979–1981	Yugoslavia U-21	17	(0)
1979–1991	Yugoslavia	133	(0)
1992–2000	Croatia	47	(0)

Teams managed
- 2003: Croatia (GK coach)
- 2003–2010: RK Zagreb (assistant)
- 2018: Croatia (GK coach)
Medal record
Representing Yugoslavia
Olympic Games
Gold medal – first place	1984 Los Angeles	Team
Bronze medal – third place	1988 Seoul	Team
World Championship
Gold medal – first place	1986 Switzerland	Team
Silver medal – second place	1982 West Germany	Team
U-21 World Championship
Gold medal – first place	1981 Portugal	Team
Silver medal – second place	1979 Denmark & Sweden	Team
Mediterranean Games
Gold medal – first place	1983 Casablanca	Team
Representing Croatia
World Championship
Gold medal – first place	2003 Portugal	Coach

Mirko Bašić (born 14 September 1960) is a Croatian former handball player who competed for Yugoslavia in the 1984 Summer Olympics and in the 1988 Summer Olympics. He also played six EHF Champions League finals, winning two in 1984–85 and 1985–86 as part of the famous RK Metaloplastika which dominated European handball in the 1980s (often referred to as Handball Aliens).

Bašić was a big influence on France's Thierry Omeyer, who is regarded as the greatest goalkeeper in handball history.

== Career ==
At the age of 16, Bašić debuted for RK Partizan Bjelovar.

In 1984 he was a member of the Yugoslav handball team which won the gold medal. He played all six matches as goalkeeper. Four years later he was part of the Yugoslav team which won the bronze medal, playing five matches.

In 1985 and 1986 he was a member of European Champions Cup winning team of RK Metaloplastika. With Metaloplastika he also won 7 Yugoslav national titles. He also played an additional ECC final with the club and reached three more semi-finals and a Cup Winners' Cup semi-final. Throughout the 1980s Bašić was considered one of the best goalkeepers in the game. In 1989 he left Šabac to play for Medveščak Zagreb for one season, winning the Yugoslav Cup with them that season.

He moved to the French First League to Vénissieux Handball in January 1989, with whom he won the 1991 cup. Then he joined the wealthy emerging OM Vitrolles in 1991 where he won the 1993 Cup Winners' Cup and in the same year was French league for the fourth time in a row. From 1993 to 1996 Bašić was in retirement from handball.

In 1996 he returned to the scene with Badel 1862 Zagreb where he played for five years winning five league and four cup titles also reaching the EHF Champions League final three times. After a season and half in RK Medveščak he ended his career in 2003 at Fotex Veszprém.

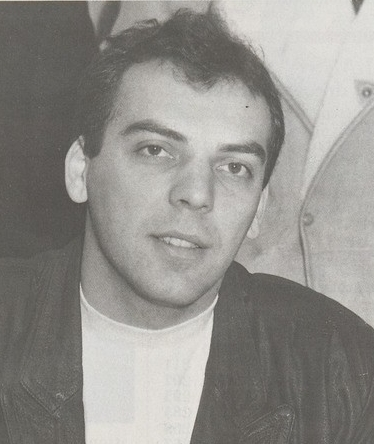
Mirko Bašić in 1988

== Personal life ==
He is the father of professional handball player Sonja Bašić.

== Honours ==
=== Player ===
Partizan Bjelovar

- Yugoslav First League (2): 1976–77, 1978–79

Metaloplastika Šabac

- Yugoslav First League (7): 1981–82, 1982–83, 1983–84, 1984–85, 1985–86, 1986–87, 1987–88
- Yugoslav Cup (3): 1983, 1984, 1986
- European Champions Cup (2): 1984–85, 1985–86, finalist (1): 1983–84

Medveščak Zagreb

- Yugoslav Cup (1): 1990

Vénissieux

- French First League runner's up (2): 1990–91 and 1991–92
- Coupe de France (1): 1991

Vitrolles

- French First League runner-up (2): 1991–92 and 1992–93
- Coupe de France (1): 1993
- Cup Winners' Cup (1): 1993, finalist (1): 1994

Badel 1862 Zagreb

- Croatian First League (5): 1996–97, 1997–98, 1998–99, 1999–00, 2000–01
- Croatian Cup (4): 1997, 1998, 1999, 2000
- EHF Champions League finalist (3): 1996–97, 1997–98, 1998–1999

Fotex Veszprém

- Hungarian First League (1): 2002–03
- Magyar Kupa (1): 2003

Individual

- Best goalkeeper in the world: 1982, 1986

=== Assistant Coach ===
RK Zagreb

- Croatian First League (7): 2003–04, 2004–05, 2005–06, 2006–07, 2007–08, 2008–09, 2009–10
- Croatian Cup (7): 2004, 2005, 2006, 2007, 2008, 2009, 2010
- IHF Cup Winners' Cup finalist (1): 2005
