= Časlav Grubić =

Serbian handball player (born 1952)

Personal information
- Full name: Časlav Grubić
- Nationality: Serbian
- Born: 20 June 1952 (age 74) Niš, FPR Yugoslavia
- Height: 1.88 m (6 ft 2 in)

Sport
- Sport: Handball
- Position: Centre back

Youth career
- Years: Team
- –: Vulkan Niš

Senior clubs
- Years: Team
- –: Železničar Niš
- 1972–1973: Partizan
- –: Železničar Niš
- 1983–1984: Tecnisa Alicante
- 1984–1986: Železničar Niš
- 1986–1988: Elgorriaga Bidasoa
National team
Years	Team	Apps	(Gls)
–	Yugoslavia	85	(122)

Teams managed
- 2018-2018: Serbia (assistent)
Medal record
Men's handball
Representing Yugoslavia
World Championship
Gold medal – first place	1986 Switzerland	Team
Silver medal – second place	1982 West Germany	Team

Časlav Grubić (Serbian Cyrillic: Часлав Грубић; born 20 June 1952) is a Serbian former handball player.

== Club career ==
After starting out at Železničar Niš, Grubić played for Partizan in the 1972–73 season, as the club suffered relegation from the top flight. He would later play for Železničar Niš on two more occasions, winning three national cups. In the 1977–78 season, Grubić helped the club reach the EHF Cup Winners' Cup final, losing to VfL Gummersbach.

In 1983, Grubić went abroad for the first time and spent one year with Spanish club Tecnisa Alicante. He later returned to Spain and played for Elgorriaga Bidasoa, helping them win the championship title in the 1986–87 season.

== International career ==
At international level, Grubić represented Yugoslavia in three World Championships, winning the gold medal in 1986.

In 2018 he was the assistant to coach of the Serbiam national team, Jovica Cvetković.

== Honours ==
Železničar Niš

- Yugoslav Handball Cup: 1976–77, 1981–82, 1984–85

Elgorriaga Bidasoa

- Liga ASOBAL: 1986–87
