= Mile Isaković =

Serbian handball player (born 1958)

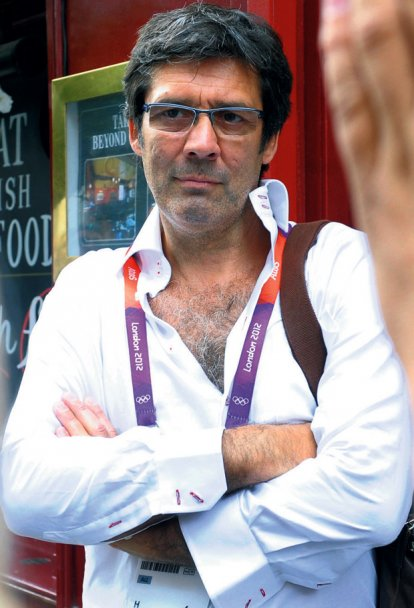
- Isaković in 2012

Personal information
- Full name: Mile Isaković
- Nationality: Serbian
- Born: 17 January 1958 (age 68) Šabac, FPR Yugoslavia
- Height: 1.86 m (6 ft 1 in)

Sport
- Sport: Handball
- Position: Left wing

Youth career
- Years: Team
- 1973–1975: Metaloplastika

Senior clubs
- Years: Team
- 1975–1986: Metaloplastika
- 1986–1987: TSV Milbertshofen
- 1987–1988: Metaloplastika
- 1988–1991: US Créteil
- 1993: OM Vitrolles
National team
Years	Team	Apps	(Gls)
1978–1990	Yugoslavia	190	(734)

Teams managed
- 1991–1995: OM Vitrolles
- 1995: Partizan
- 2004: Serbia and Montenegro (women)
- 12/2004–02/2005: Hypo NÖ
- 2005–2006: Secchia
- 2006–2008: US Créteil
Medal record
Men's handball
Representing Yugoslavia
Olympic Games
Gold medal – first place	1984 Los Angeles	Team
World Championship
Gold medal – first place	1986 Switzerland	Team
Silver medal – second place	1982 West Germany	Team
Mediterranean Games
Gold medal – first place	1983 Casablanca	Team

Mile Isaković (Serbian Cyrillic: Миле Исаковић; born 17 January 1958) is a Serbian handball coach and former player who competed for Yugoslavia in the 1980 Summer Olympics and in the 1984 Summer Olympics.

== Club career ==
Born in Šabac, Isaković started out at his hometown club Metaloplastika. He would become the club's all-time top scorer, helping them win six Yugoslav Championships (1981–82, 1982–83, 1983–84, 1984–85, 1985–86, and 1987–88), four Yugoslav Cups (1979–80, 1982–83, 1983–84, and 1985–86), and two successive European Cups (1984–85 and 1985–86). In 1988, Isaković went abroad to France and spent three seasons with US Créteil.

== International career ==
At international level, Isaković represented Yugoslavia for over a decade. He was an instrumental member of the team that won the gold medal at the 1984 Summer Olympics. Subsequently, Isaković helped Yugoslavia win the gold medal at the 1986 World Championship.

== Coaching career ==
In 1991, Isaković started his coaching career at French club OM Vitrolles. He led the team to victory in the 1993 Cup Winners' Cup. Later on, Isaković served as head coach of Austrian women's team Hypo Niederösterreich (from December 2004 to February 2005) and Italian men's team Secchia (2005–06). He would spend the next two seasons at the helm of his former club US Créteil.

== Honours ==
=== Player ===
Metaloplastika

- Yugoslav Handball Championship: 1981–82, 1982–83, 1983–84, 1984–85, 1985–86, 1987–88
- Yugoslav Handball Cup: 1979–80, 1982–83, 1983–84, 1985–86
- European Cup: 1984–85, 1985–86

US Créteil

- Championnat de France: 1988–89
- Coupe de France: 1988–89

=== Coach ===
OM Vitrolles

- Championnat de France: 1993–94
- Coupe de France: 1992–93, 1994–95
- Cup Winners' Cup: 1992–93
