= Slobodan Kuzmanovski =

Serbian handball player (born 1962)

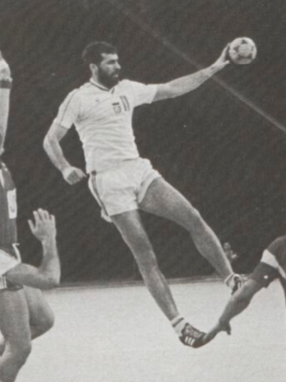
- Kuzmanovski in 1988

Personal information
- Full name: Slobodan Kuzmanovski
- Nationality: Serbian
- Born: 11 June 1962 (age 64) Šabac, PR Serbia, FPR Yugoslavia
- Height: 1.98 m (6 ft 6 in)

Sport
- Sport: Handball
- Position: Right back

Youth career
- Years: Team
- –: Metaloplastika

Senior clubs
- Years: Team
- –: Metaloplastika
- 1989–1990: Puleva Málaga
- 1990–1991: TSV St. Otmar St. Gallen
- 1991–1996: OM Vitrolles
- 1996–1997: Prosesa Ademar León
- 1997–1998: Trieste
National team
- Years: Team
- –: Yugoslavia

Teams managed
- 2005: Gaeta
- 2008: Junior Fasano
- 2013: Štart Nové Zámky
Medal record
Men's handball
Representing Yugoslavia
Olympic Games
Gold medal – first place	1984 Los Angeles	Team
Bronze medal – third place	1988 Seoul	Team

Slobodan Kuzmanovski (Serbian Cyrillic: Слободан Кузмановски; born 11 June 1962) is a Serbian handball coach and former player who competed for Yugoslavia in the 1984 Summer Olympics and in the 1988 Summer Olympics.

== Club career ==
Born in Šabac, Kuzmanovski started out at his hometown club Metaloplastika. He helped them win seven consecutive Yugoslav Championships (1981–82, 1982–83, 1983–84, 1984–85, 1985–86, 1986–87, and 1987–88), four Yugoslav Cups (1979–80, 1982–83, 1983–84, and 1985–86), and two successive European Cups (1984–85 and 1985–86). Later on, Kuzmanovski played abroad in Spain, Switzerland, France, and Italy.

== International career ==
At international level, Kuzmanovski won two Olympic medals for Yugoslavia, one gold (1984) and one bronze (1988). He was also a member of the team that placed fourth in the 1990 World Championship.

== Coaching career ==
In 2013, Kuzmanovski briefly served as head coach of Slovak team Štart Nové Zámky. He previously coached Gaeta and Junior Fasano in Italy.

== Honours ==
Metaloplastika

- Yugoslav Handball Championship: 1981–82, 1982–83, 1983–84, 1984–85, 1985–86, 1986–87, 1987–88
- Yugoslav Handball Cup: 1979–80, 1982–83, 1983–84, 1985–86
- European Cup: 1984–85, 1985–86

OM Vitrolles

- Championnat de France: 1993–94, 1995–96
- Coupe de France: 1992–93, 1994–95
- Cup Winners' Cup: 1992–93
