= Ivan Snoj =

Croatian handball coach and official (1923-1994)

Personal information
- Born: 13 October 1923 Zagreb, Kingdom of Yugoslavia
- Died: 18 September 1994 (aged 70) Zagreb, Croatia

Sport
- Sport: Handball

Teams managed
- Years: Team
- 1951-1978: Yugoslavia
Medal record
Representing Yugoslavia
Olympic Games
Gold medal – first place	1972 Munich	Team
World Championship
Bronze medal – third place	1970 France	Team
Bronze medal – third place	1974 East Germany	Team
Statoil World Cup
Gold medal – first place	1971 Sweden	Team
Gold medal – first place	1974 Sweden	Team
Mediterranean Games
Gold medal – first place	1967 Tunis	Team
Gold medal – first place	1975 Algeria	Team

Ivan Snoj (born 31 October 1923, Zagreb – 18 September 1994) was a Croatian team handball coach and international referee, international sports official, journalist and publicist. By profession he was gym teacher.

Ivan Snoj was one of founders of the Croatian Handball Federation on 19 December 1948.

He was the selector and coach of Croatian first youth team in 1949, on a Yugoslav federal tournament of republican teams which was held in Zagreb. From 1951-1978, he had the function of federal captain (manager) of the Yugoslav team. He was the coach of Yugoslav team that took fifth place at the 1976 Olympics.

Later he was high-positioned official of the International Handball Federation, serving as its vice-president from 1984 to 1992.

== Honours ==
Yugoslavia

- 1958 World Championship - 8th
- 1961 World Championship - 9th
- 1964 World Championship - 6th
- 1967 World Championship - 7th
- 1970 World Championship - 3rd
- 1972 Summer Olympics - 1st
- 1974 World Championship - 3rd
- 1976 Summer Olympics - 5th
- 1978 World Championship - 5th

== Sources ==
- Gizdić, Jurica (2014). Kovači hrvatskih olimpijskih odličja (PDF) (in Croatian). Zagreb: Croatian Olympic Committee. p. 116. ISBN 978-953-7912-01-7. Archived from the original (PDF) on 2021-04-16.
