= Jovica Cvetković =

Serbian handball player (born 1959)

Personal information
- Full name: Jovica Cvetković
- Nationality: Serbian
- Born: 18 September 1959 (age 67) Belgrade, PR Serbia, FPR Yugoslavia
- Height: 1.92 m (6 ft 4 in)

Sport
- Sport: Handball
- Position: Right back

Youth career
- Years: Team
- –: Partizan
- –: ORK Beograd

Senior clubs
- Years: Team
- 1977: Dinamo Pancevo
- 1977–1984: Crvena zvezda
- 1984–1985: Metaloplastika
- 1985–1987: Crvena zvezda
- 1987–1988: GWD Minden
- 1988–1989: Elgorriaga Bidasoa
- 1990–1991: Teka Cantabria
- 1991–1993: Conversano
- 1993–1994: Conquense
National team
- Years: Team
- –: Yugoslavia

Teams managed
- –: Conversano
- 1996–1997: Crvena zvezda
- 2003–2004: Crvena zvezda
- 2005–2006: Metalurg Skopje
- 2006–2009: Serbia
- 2010: HCM Constanța
- 2012: Železničar 1949
- 2012: Železničar 1949
- 2013: Borac Banja Luka
- 2016–2018: Serbia
Medal record
Men's handball
Representing Yugoslavia
World Championship
Gold medal – first place	1986 Switzerland	Team
Representing Serbia
Mediterranean Games
Gold medal – first place	2009 Pescara	Staff

Jovica Cvetković (Serbian Cyrillic: Јовица Цветковић; born 18 September 1959) is a Serbian handball coach and former player who competed for Yugoslavia in the 1980 Summer Olympics.

== Club career ==
At club level, Cvetković played for Crvena zvezda (two spells), Metaloplastika, GWD Minden, Elgorriaga Bidasoa, Teka Cantabria, Conversano and Conquense. He won the European Cup with Metaloplastika in the 1984–85 season.

== International career ==
At international level, Cvetković represented Yugoslavia in the 1980 Summer Olympics. He was also a member of the team that won the 1986 World Championship.

== Coaching career ==
During his coaching career, Cvetković won domestic doubles in three countries: Serbia and Montenegro (with Crvena zvezda in 2003–04), Macedonia (with Metalurg Skopje in 2005–06), and Bosnia and Herzegovina (with Borac Banja Luka in 2012–13).

In September 2006, Cvetković was appointed as head coach for Serbia. He led the team at the 2009 World Championship in the nation's debut appearance in major tournaments. After winning the gold medal at the 2009 Mediterranean Games, Cvetković stepped down from his position.

In 2012, Cvetković served as head coach of Serbian Handball Super League team Železničar 1949 on two separate occasions (April–June and October–December).

== Honours ==
=== Player ===
Metaloplastika

- Yugoslav Handball Championship: 1984–85
- European Cup: 1984–85

=== Coach ===
Crvena zvezda

- Serbia and Montenegro Handball Super League: 1996–97, 2003–04
- Serbia and Montenegro Handball Cup: 2003–04

Metalurg Skopje

- Macedonian Handball Super League: 2005–06
- Macedonian Handball Cup: 2005–06

Borac Banja Luka

- Handball Championship of Bosnia and Herzegovina: 2012–13
- Handball Cup of Bosnia and Herzegovina: 2012–13
