= Branislav Pokrajac =

Serbian handball player and coach (1947–2018)

Personal information
- Full name: Branislav Pokrajac
- Nationality: Serbian
- Born: 27 January 1947 Belgrade, FPR Yugoslavia
- Died: 5 April 2018 (aged 71) Belgrade, Serbia
- Height: 1.86 m (6 ft 1 in)

Sport
- Sport: Handball
- Position: Left wing

Senior clubs
- Years: Team
- –: ORK Beograd
- –: Crvena zvezda
- –: Dinamo Pančevo
National team
- Years: Team
- 1965–1976: Yugoslavia

Teams managed
- –: Dinamo Pančevo
- 1980–1984: Yugoslavia
- 1985: Spain
- 1988: United States
- 1989–1991: US Créteil
- 1992–1993: Crvena zvezda
- –: Egypt
- 2000–2001: FR Yugoslavia
- 2001–2003: Porto
- –: Qatar
- 2006: Partizan
- 2010–2012: Sporting CP
Medal record
Men's handball
Representing Yugoslavia
Olympic Games
Gold medal – first place	1972 Munich	Team
Gold medal – first place	1984 Los Angeles	Staff
World Championship
Bronze medal – third place	1970 Paris	Team
Bronze medal – third place	1974 East Germany	Team
Silver medal – second place	1982 West Germany	Staff
Mediterranean Games
Gold medal – first place	1967 Tunis	Team
Gold medal – first place	1975 Algiers	Team
Representing FR Yugoslavia
World Championship
Bronze medal – third place	2001 France	Staff

Branislav Pokrajac (Serbian Cyrillic: Бранислав Покрајац; 27 January 1947 – 5 April 2018) was a Serbian handball coach and player who competed for Yugoslavia in the 1972 Summer Olympics and in the 1976 Summer Olympics.

== Club career ==
At club level, Pokrajac made his debut with ORK Beograd, before moving to Crvena zvezda. He later played for and served as head coach of Dinamo Pančevo.

== International career ==
At international level, Pokrajac competed for Yugoslavia in two Olympic tournaments, winning the gold medal in 1972. He also won two bronze medals at the World Championships (1970 and 1974).

== Coaching career ==
In 1980, Pokrajac was appointed as head coach for Yugoslavia. He led the team to the Olympic gold medal in 1984.
