= Veselin Vujović =

Yugoslav handball player (born 1961)

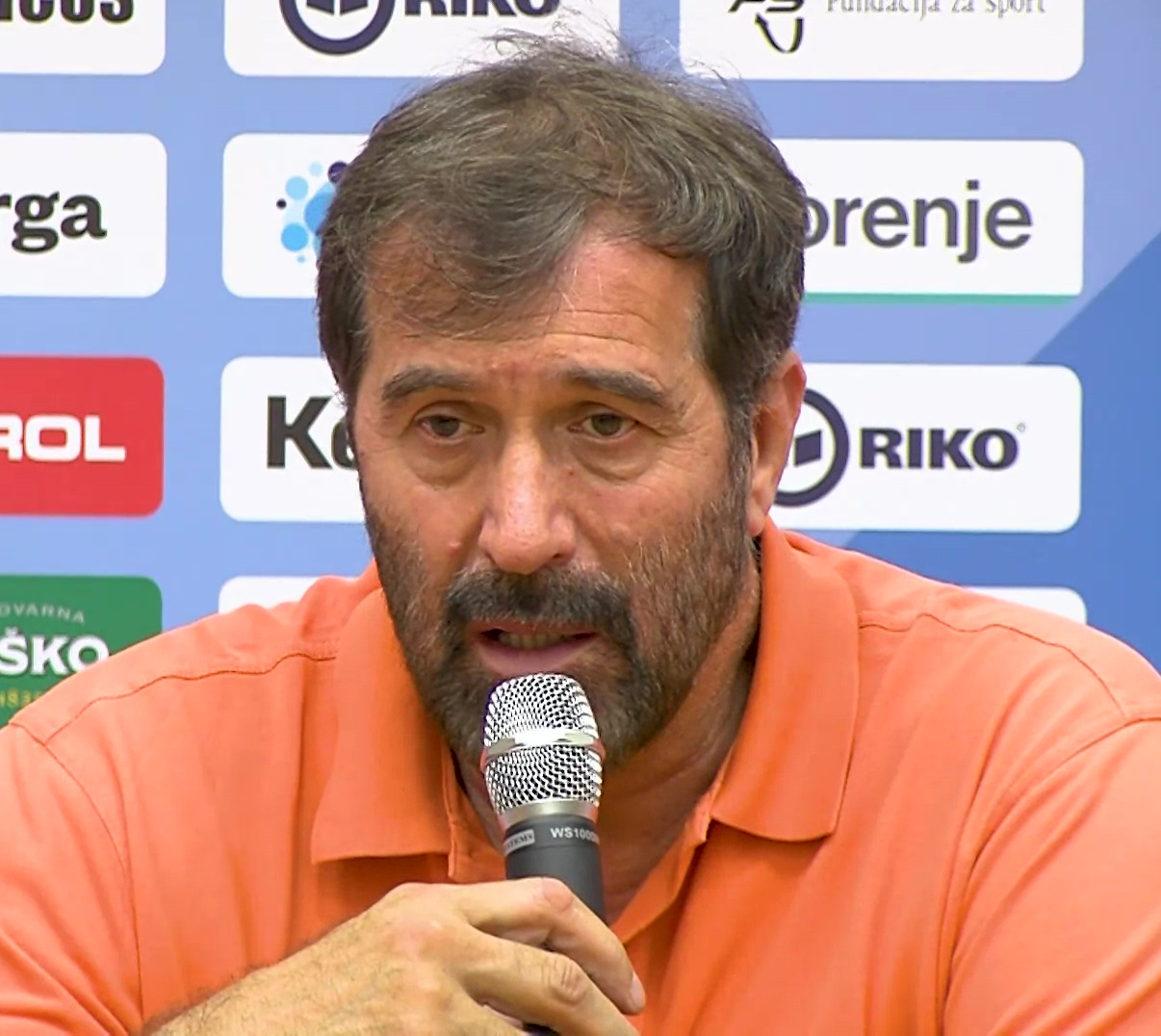
- Vujović in 2017

Personal information
- Nationality: Montenegrin
- Born: 18 January 1961 (age 65) Cetinje, PR Montenegro, FPR Yugoslavia
- Height: 1.96 m (6 ft 5 in)

Sport
- Sport: Handball
- Position: Left back
- Current club: Qatar (head coach)

Youth career
- Years: Team
- –: Lovćen

Senior clubs
- Years: Team
- 1977–1979: Lovćen
- 1979–1988: Metaloplastika
- 1988–1993: Barcelona
- 1993–1995: Granollers
National team
Years	Team	Apps	(Gls)
1981–1992	Yugoslavia	183	(738)
1993–1996	FR Yugoslavia		

Teams managed
- 1995–1999: RK Metaloplastika
- 1999–2000: RK Partizan
- 2000: FR Yugoslavia
- 2000–2003: BM Ciudad Real
- 2003–2006: Serbia and Montenegro
- 2006–2009: RK Vardar PRO
- 2007: Macedonia
- 2010: Al Sadd
- 2011–2013: RK Vardar PRO
- 2013–2014: Al Shabab
- 2014–2016: RK Zagreb
- 2015–2019: Slovenia
- 2017–2018: RD Koper 2013
- 2018–2019: RK Železničar 1949
- 2019–2020: RK Zagreb
- 2021: RK Borac Banja Luka
- 2021: RK Vardar 1961
- 2022–2023: Iran
- 2023–2024: Sepahan
- 2024: RK Nexe Našice
- 2025–: Qatar
Medal record
Representing Yugoslavia & FR Yugoslavia
Olympic Games
Gold medal – first place	1984 Los Angeles	Team
Bronze medal – third place	1988 Seoul	Team
World Championship
Gold medal – first place	1986 Switzerland
Silver medal – second place	1982 West Germany
European Championship
Bronze medal – third place	1996 Spain
Mediterranean Games
Gold medal – first place	1983 Casablanca
Head Coach for Slovenia
World Championship
Bronze medal – third place	2017 France

Veselin Vujović (born 18 January 1961) is a Montenegrin handball coach and former professional player. He is the current head coach of RK Nexe Našice and Qatar men's national handball team.

As a player, Vujović competed at the 1984 and 1988 Summer Olympics for the Yugoslavia national team.

== Playing career ==
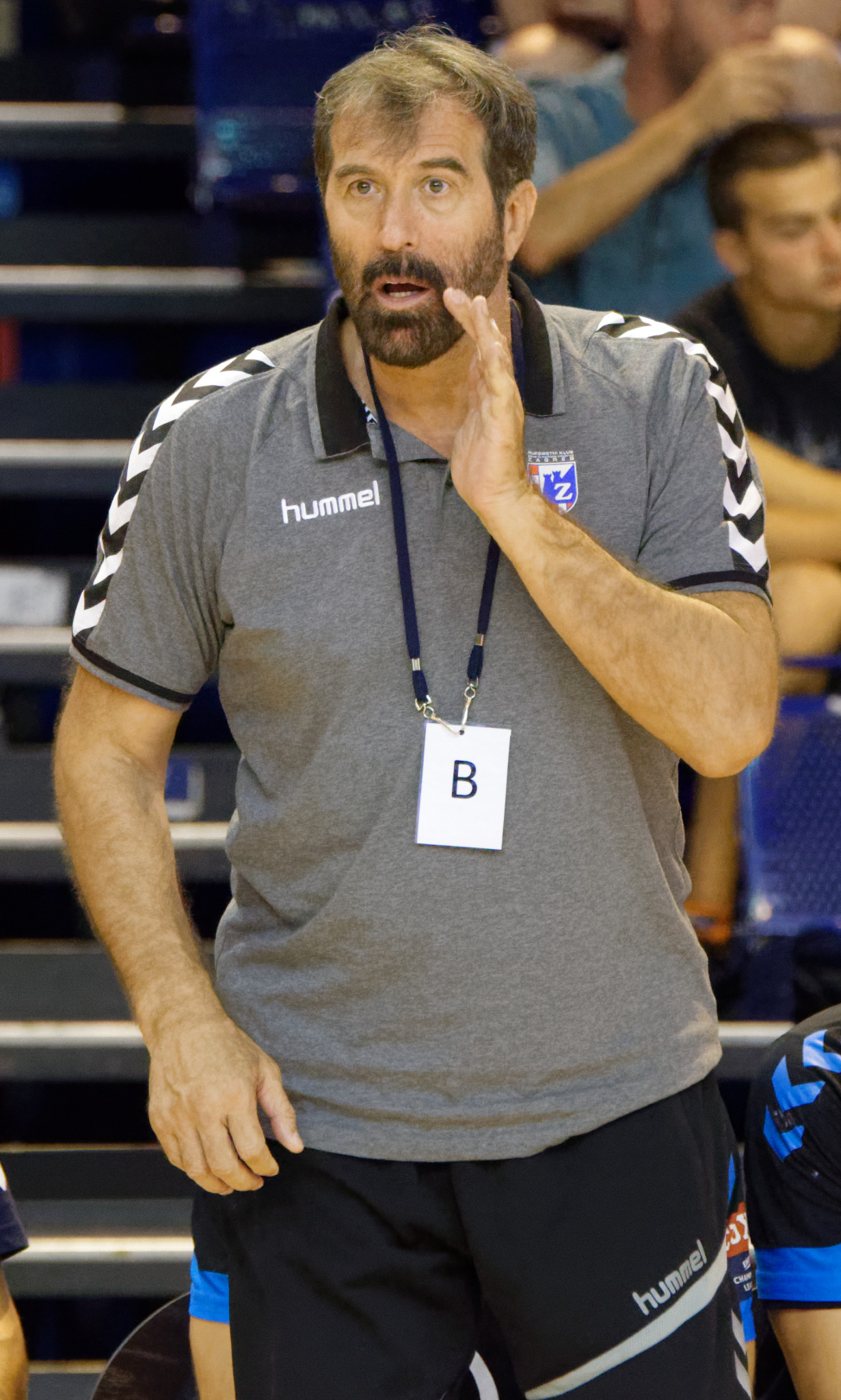
Vujović managing RK Zagreb in September 2016

During his career, Vujović played for RK Metaloplastika, Barcelona and Granollers. At Metaloplastika, he was part of the club golden generation during the 1980s, winning seven league titles, 4 cup titles and two European Champions Cup titles. Vujović also lost one final in 1984 and three semi-final matches in the European Champions Cup while playing for Metaloplastika.

In 1986, he was named as the best athlete of Yugoslavia.

He was the first player to receive the title of the IHF World Player of the Year.

In 1984, he was a member of the Yugoslav national team which won the gold medal at the Olympics. He played all six matches and scored 28 goals. Four years later, he was part of the Yugoslav team which won the bronze medal. He played all six matches again and scored 29 goals.

== Coaching career ==
At the 2017 World Championship he guided the Slovenia team to a bronze medal, which is Slovenias best ever result at a World Championship and only the second ever medal at a major tournament.

== Honours ==
=== Player ===
Metaloplastika

- Yugoslav First League: 1981–82, 1982–83, 1983–84, 1984–85, 1985–86, 1986–87, 1987–88
- Yugoslav Cup: 1980, 1983, 1984, 1986
- European Champions Cup: 1984–85, 1985–86

Barcelona

- Liga ASOBAL: 1988–89, 1989–90, 1990–91, 1991–92
- Copa del Rey: 1990, 1993
- Supercopa ASOBAL: 1988–89, 1989–90, 1990–91, 1991–92
- European Champions Cup: 1990–91
- Catalan League: 1990–91, 1991–92, 1992–93

Granollers

- Copa ASOBAL: 1994
- EHF Cup: 1995

Individual

- Yugoslavia all-time top scorer – 738
- Athlete of the Year in Yugoslavia – 1986
- IHF World Player of the Year – 1988
- Handball player of the Year in Yugoslavia: 1986, 1988

=== Manager ===
FR Yugoslavia

- 2000 Summer Olympics – 4th place

Ciudad Real

- Copa del Rey: 2001, 2003
- EHF Cup Winners' Cup: 2002, 2003

Serbia and Montenegro

- World Championship U-19: 2005

Vardar

- Macedonian Super League: 2006–07, 2008–09, 2012–13
- Macedonian Cup: 2007, 2008, 2012
- SEHA League: 2011–12

Al Sadd

- Qatar First Division: 2009–10
- Qatar Crown Prince Cup: 2010

Zagreb

- Dukat Premier League: 2014–15, 2015–16
- Croatian Cup: 2015, 2016

Slovenia

- 2017 World Championship – 3rd place

Awards and achievements
Preceded by Dražen Petrović	(Socialist Federal Republic of Yugoslavia) The Best Athlete of Yugoslavia; 1986	Succeeded by Mateja Svet
