= 1989–90 División de Honor de Balonmano =

División de Honor
- Season: 1989–90
- Champions: FC Barcelona

The 1988–89 División de Honor de Balonmano season was the 32nd since its establishment. FC Barcelona were the defending champions, having won the previous season. A total of 16 teams contested the league, 14 of which had already contested in the 1988–89 season, and two of which were promoted from the Primera División.

FC Barcelona won the title for the 8th time with one point more than Teka Cantabria.

== Team information ==
División de Honor teams

Team	Home city	Stadium	Capacity
Atlético Madrid	Madrid	Polideportivo Magariños	1,000
Cajamadrid	Alcalá de Henares	Pabellón Cajamadrid	4,500
Arrate	Eibar	Polideportivo Ipurua	3,500
Barcelona	Barcelona	Palau Blaugrana	8,250
Teka Cantabria	Santander		
Avidesa	Alzira		
Elgorriaga Bidasoa	Irun		
Helados Alacant	Alicante		
Teucro CajaPontevedra	Pontevedra		
Lagisa Ceset Naranco	Oviedo		
Puleva Maristas	Málaga		
Palautordera	Santa Maria de Palautordera		
Cuenca	Cuenca		
Cacaolat Granollers	Granollers	Palau d'Esports	6,500
Michelín	Valladolid		
Mepamsa San Antonio	Pamplona	Pabellón Universitario	3,000

Team information and squads: cf. "Clubs participantes e plantillas en la Liga masculina División de Honor 89-90" (PDF). Anuario deportivo 1991 - Temporada 1989-1990 (in Spanish). Asociación de la Prensa de Madrid.

== League table ==
	Team	P	W	D	L	G+	G−	Pts
1	Barcelona	30	24	4	2	771	570	52
2	Teka	30	24	3	3	770	640	51
3	At. Madrid	30	22	2	6	737	590	46
4	Cacaolat	30	19	6	5	792	656	44
5	Avidesa	30	19	3	8	774	697	41
6	Elgorriaga	30	20	0	10	723	635	40
7	Cajamadrid	30	18	4	8	761	686	40
8	Arrate	30	13	2	15	703	753	28
9	M. San Antonio	30	13	1	16	698	759	27
10	Michelín	30	10	2	18	629	684	22
11	Helados Alacant	30	9	2	19	681	760	20
12	Teucro CP	30	8	2	20	672	747	18
13	Ceset Naranco	30	7	2	21	614	736	16
14	Puleva M.	30	7	1	22	658	780	15
15	BM Cuenca	30	7	1	22	662	725	15
16	Palautordera	30	2	1	27	589	816	5

In–Out promotion
Relegated

== Top scorers ==
#	Player	Club	Goals
1	Kim G. Jacobsen	BM Cuenca	219
2	Vasile Stîngă	Avidesa Valencia	202
3	Zoran Puzović	CD Cajamadrid	192
4	Alfreð Gíslason	Elgorriaga Bidasoa	178
5	Veselin Vujović	FC Barcelona	178
6	Bogdan Wenta	Elgorriaga Bidasoa	167
7	Kaare Rannekleiv	Helados Alacant	155
8	Eugenio Serrano	FC Barcelona	144
9	Enric Masip	Cacaolat Granollers	143
10	Muhamed Memić	Xerox Arrate	142
