= Heiko Bonath =

East German handball player

Medal record

Men's handball

Representing East Germany

World Championships
| Bronze medal – third place | 1986 Switzerland | Handball |

Heiko Bonath (born 1 April 1961) is a former handballer from East Germany, who played for the club SC Dynamo Berlin. He won the bronze medal at the world championships in 1986.

His son Rico Bonath is also a handball player.
