= Nebojša Golić =

Bosnian-Serbian handball player (born 1977)

Personal information
- Full name: Nebojša Golić
- Nationality: Bosnian / Serbian
- Born: 23 January 1977 (age 49) Banja Luka, SR Bosnia-Herzegovina, SFR Yugoslavia
- Height: 1.83 m (6 ft 0 in)

Sport
- Sport: Handball
- Position: Centre back

Youth career
- Years: Team
- –: Borac Banja Luka

Senior clubs
- Years: Team
- 1992–1997: Borac Banja Luka
- 1997–1999: Metaloplastika
- 1999–2001: Sintelon
- 2001–2007: HSG Wetzlar
- 2007–2008: Borac Banja Luka
- 2008–2009: Bosna Sarajevo
National team
- Years: Team
- 1999–2002: FR Yugoslavia
Medal record
Men's handball
Representing FR Yugoslavia
World Championship
Bronze medal – third place	1999 Egypt	Team
Bronze medal – third place	2001 France	Team
World University Championship
Gold medal – first place	1998 Novi Sad	Team

Nebojša Golić (Serbian Cyrillic: Небојша Голић; born 23 January 1977) is a Bosnian-Serbian former handball player. He is the cousin of fellow handball player Andrej Golic.

== Club career ==
After starting out at his hometown club Borac Banja Luka, Golić moved to FR Yugoslavia to play for Metaloplastika and later Sintelon (1999–2001), before eventually transferring to Germany. He would go on to spend six seasons with HSG Wetzlar (2001–2007). In 2007, Golić returned to Borac Banja Luka after 10 years abroad. He also played for Bosna Sarajevo for one and a half seasons, before becoming inactive.

== International career ==
Golić represented FR Yugoslavia in international tournaments, winning two bronze medals at the World Championships (1999 and 2001). He also participated in the 2000 Summer Olympics and 2002 European Championship. Previously, Golić won the gold medal at the 1998 World University Championship.

== Honours ==
Sintelon

- Handball Cup of FR Yugoslavia: 1999–2000

Bosna Sarajevo

- Handball Championship of Bosnia and Herzegovina: 2008–09
- Handball Cup of Bosnia and Herzegovina: 2008–09
