= Miloš Dragaš =

Serbian handball player (born 1990)

Personal information
- Nationality: Serbian
- Born: 11 June 1990 (age 36) Priboj, SFR Yugoslavia
- Height: 2.01 m (6 ft 7 in)

Sport
- Sport: Handball
- Position: Left back
- Current club: Anorthosis Famagusta
- Number: 7

Youth career
- Years: Team
- –: Priboj

Senior clubs
- Years: Team
- 2009–2010: Lokomotiva Brčko
- 2010–2012: Metaloplastika
- 2012–2013: Vardar
- 2013–2014: Metaloplastika
- 2014–2015: Bergischer HC
- 2016: Metalurg Skopje
- 2017: Hapoel Rishon LeZion
- 2017: Székelyudvarhelyi KC
- 2018: Minaur Baia Mare
- 2018–2019: Politehnica Timișoara
- 2020–2024: Potaissa Turda
National team
- Years: Team
- 2012–: Serbia

Miloš Dragaš (Serbian Cyrillic: Милош Драгаш; born 11 June 1990) is a Serbian handball player for Romanian club Potaissa Turda and the Serbia national team.

== Club career ==
After starting out at his hometown club Priboj, Dragaš moved across the border and played for Bosnian team Lokomotiva Brčko in the 2009–10 season. He subsequently returned to Serbia, spending two and a half years with Metaloplastika, before moving to Macedonian club Vardar in November 2012. In the 2013–14 season, Dragaš rejoined Metaloplastika, helping them reach the EHF Challenge Cup final.

In June 2014, Dragaš signed a three-year deal with Handball-Bundesliga team Bergischer HC. His contract was terminated by mutual consent on 28 December 2015. After playing for Metalurg Skopje and Hapoel Rishon LeZion, Dragaš moved to Romania and joined Székelyudvarhelyi KC in June 2017. He would also play for Minaur Baia Mare, Politehnica Timișoara and Potaissa Turda.

== International career ==
At international level, Dragaš represented Serbia at the 2013 World Championship.

== Honours ==
Vardar

- Macedonian Handball Super League: 2012–13

Politehnica Timișoara

- Cupa României: 2018–19
