= Handball Federation of Yugoslavia =

- Founded: 1949
- Dissolved: 1992
- Type: Handball federation
- Location: Belgrade
- Region served: Yugoslavia

The Handball Federation of Yugoslavia (Serbo-Croatian: Rukometni Savez Jugoslavije, Рукометни Савез Југославије; Slovene: Rokometna zveza Jugoslavije; Macedonian: Ракометен Сојуз на Југославија) was the governing body of team handball in SFR Yugoslavia. It was formed in 1949.

It organized the men's national team, women's national team and a national championship.

== Successor federations ==
- Handball Federation of Bosnia and Herzegovina
- Croatian Handball Federation
- Handball Federation of Kosovo
- Macedonian Handball Federation
- Handball Federation of Montenegro
- Handball Federation of Serbia
- Handball Federation of Slovenia
