= Branko Kankaraš =

Serbian-Montenegrin handball player (born 1988)

Personal information
- Full name: Branko Kankaraš
- Nationality: Serbian / Montenegrin
- Born: 28 May 1988 (age 38) Novi Sad, SR Serbia, Yugoslavia
- Height: 1.88 m (6 ft 2 in)

Sport
- Sport: Handball
- Position: Pivot

Youth career
- Years: Team
- –: RK Jugović

Senior clubs
- Years: Team
- 2006–2013: RK Jugović
- 2013–2014: RK Metaloplastika
- 2014: RK Vojvodina
- 2014–2015: Mersin
- 2015–2017: Valence Handball
- 2017–2019: Istres Provence Handball
- 2019–2020: HC Meshkov Brest
- 2020: RK Metalurg Skopje
- 2021–2022: Maccabi Rishon LeZion
- 2022–2023: RK Crvena zvezda
- 2023: RK Metaloplastika
National team
Years	Team	Apps	(Gls)
2014–2023	Montenegro	17	(7)

Branko Kankaraš (Serbian Cyrillic: Бранко Канкараш; born 28 May 1988) is a retired Serbian-born Montenegrin handball player.

== Club career ==
At club level, Kankaraš played in Serbia (Jugović, Metaloplastika, and Vojvodina), Turkey (Mersin), France (Valence and Istres), Belarus (Meshkov Brest), North Macedonia (Metalurg Skopje), and Israel (Maccabi Rishon LeZion).

== International career ==
At international level, Kankaraš represented Montenegro at two European Championships (2016 and 2020).
