= Sasa Zivoulovic =

Serbian-Greek handball player (1972–2023)

Personal information
- Nationality: Serbian/Greek
- Born: 14 April 1972 Zaječar, SR Serbia, SFR Yugoslavia
- Died: 9 February 2023 (aged 50)
- Height: 1.87 m (6 ft 2 in)

Sport
- Sport: Handball
- Position: Right back

Senior clubs
- Years: Team
- 1990–1993: RK Zaječar
- 1993–1996: RK Jagodina
- 1996–1998: RK Metaloplastika
- 1998–2000: Panellinios
- 2000–2010: ASE Douka
National team
- Years: Team
- 2004–2007: Greece

Teams managed
- 2016–2019: OF Nea Ionia (women's)
- 2020–2023: OF Nea Ionia (women's)

Sasa Zivoulovic (14 April 1972 – 9 February 2023) was a Serbian-Greek handball player. He competed in the men's tournament at the 2004 Summer Olympics.
