= Darko Arsić =

Serbian handball player (born 1989)

Personal information
- Nationality: Serbian
- Born: 20 January 1989 (age 37) Vranje, Serbia
- Height: 1.95 m (6 ft 5 in)

Sport
- Sport: Handball
- Position: Goalkeeper
- Current club: RK Metaloplastika
- Number: 16

Senior clubs
- Years: Team
- –2016: RK Metaloplastika
- 2016–2017: RK Metalurg Skopje
- 2018: RK Metaloplastika
- 2018–2020: Tremblay-en-France
- 2020–2021: Ramat Hasharon HC
- 2021–: RK Metaloplastika
National team
Years	Team	Apps	(Gls)
–	Serbia	2	(0)

Darko Arsić (born 20 January 1989) is a Serbian handball player who plays for RK Metaloplastika and for the Serbia men's national handball team.
