= Muhamed Memić =

Bosnian handball player

Personal information
- Full name: Muhamed Memić
- Nationality: Bosnian
- Born: 2 September 1960 (age 66) Derventa, FPR Yugoslavia
- Height: 1.86 m (6 ft 1 in)

Sport
- Sport: Handball
- Position: Right wing

Youth career
- Years: Team
- –: Derventa

Senior clubs
- Years: Team
- –1979: Derventa
- 1979–1980: Metaloplastika
- 1980–1989: Sloga Doboj
- 1989–1991: Xerox Arrate
- 1991–1994: CB Adrianense
National team
Years	Team	Apps	(Gls)
–	Yugoslavia	89	(107)
–	Bosnia		
Medal record
Men's handball
Representing Yugoslavia
Olympic Games
Bronze medal – third place	1988 Seoul	Team
World Championship
Gold medal – first place	1986 Switzerland	Team

Muhamed Memić (born 2 September 1960) is a Bosnian former handball player who competed for Yugoslavia in the 1988 Summer Olympics.

== Club career ==
After starting out at his hometown club Derventa, Memić spent one season with Metaloplastika, before joining Sloga Doboj. With Metaloplastika he won the Yugoslav Cup in 1980. He moved abroad to Spain and signed with Xerox Arrate in 1989. He later joined the second tier team CD Adrianense.

== International career ==
At international level, Memić represented Yugoslavia at the 1986 World Championship, winning the gold medal. He was also a member of the team that won the bronze medal at the 1988 Summer Olympics.

After the Dissolution of Yugoslavia he played for the Bosnia and Herzegovina men's national handball team.
