= RK Metaloplastika =

Serbian handball club

- Full name: Rukometni klub Metaloplastika
- Nickname: Plavi (The Blues)
- Founded: 1958; 68 years ago
- Arena: Gimnazija Sport Hall, Šabac
- Capacity: 1,500
- Head coach: David Rašić
- League: Arkus Liga
- Club colours
Home	Away

RK Metaloplastika (Serbian Cyrillic: РК Металопластика) is a Serbian handball club based in Šabac. They compete in the Serbian Handball Super League.

Location of RK Metaloplastika

== History ==
The club itself dates back to 1958. They initially competed under the name Partizan. In 1970, the club changed its name to Metaloplastika after being taken over by the industrial company of the same name. They earned promotion to the Yugoslav Championship in 1974. The club won its first trophy, the Yugoslav Cup, in the 1979–80 season, securing a spot in European competitions for the first time ever. They subsequently reached the Cup Winners' Cup semi-finals in their debut international appearance. The 1980s saw the club became champions of Yugoslavia a record seven times in a row, commencing from the 1981–82 season. They also established themselves as a dominant force in European club handball, making three straight European Cup finals appearances. After losing the 1984 final, the club won back-to-back titles in 1985 and 1986 the squad was nicknamed "the Šabac Aliens" by the media. In the 2013–14 season, the club reached the EHF Challenge Cup final. They played just one tie due to the severe flooding in Serbia, losing away to IK Sävehof in Sweden. In the 2015–16 season, the club won the Serbian Cup, ending a run of 28 years without a trophy. In the 2021–2022 season, the club won the Serbian Cup again.

== Crest, colours, supporters ==
=== Naming history ===
Name	Period
Partizan Šabac	1958−1968
Mačva Šabac	1968–1970
Metaloplastika Šabac	1970–present

=== Club crest ===
New Logo
(2017–present)

== Team ==
=== Current squad ===
Squad for the 2024–25 season

RK Metaloplastika

Goalkeepers

- 1 (Serbia) Vanja Damjanović
- 12 (Serbia) Damjan Marjanović
- 16 (Serbia) Darko Arsić

Left Wingers

- 10 (Serbia) Filip Milovanović
- 44 (Serbia) Uroš Simić

Right Wingers

- 2 (Serbia) Mateja Dodić
- 71 (Serbia) Milija Papović

Line Players

- 11 (Serbia) Igor Milovanović
- 18 (Serbia) Uroš Pavlović
- 34 (Serbia) Kosta Petrović

Left Backs

- 7 (Serbia) Vojin Mišić
- 13 (Georgia (country)) Miriani Gavashelishvili
- 77 (Serbia) Borivoje Đukić

Central Backs

- 4 (Bosnia and Herzegovina) Domagoj Alilović
- 17 (Serbia) Aljoša Damjanović
- 58 (Serbia) Milan Dakić

Right Backs

- 9 (Serbia) Brana Mirković
- 14 (Serbia) Luka Jevtić

=== Technical staff ===
- Head Coach: (Serbia) David Rašić

=== Transfers ===
Transfers for the 2026–27 season

Joining

- (North Macedonia) Dejan Kukulovski (LB) from (North Macedonia) GRK Ohrid
- (Serbia) Vladimir Jevtić (LP) from (Serbia) RK Partizan
- (Serbia) Jovan Jevremović (GK) from (Serbia) RK Partizan

Leaving

- (Slovenia) Nik Ćirović (LB) to (Serbia) RK Vojvodina
- (Serbia) Brana Mirković (RB) to (Serbia) RK Partizan
- (Serbia) Milija Papović (RW) to (Serbia) RK Partizan
- (Serbia) Luka Jevtić (RB) to (Spain) BM Logroño La Rioja
- (Serbia) Igor Milovanović (LP) to (France) Union sportive de Saintes Handball
- (Serbia) Stefan Stojinović (RB) to (Serbia) RK Crvena zvezda
- (Serbia) Vanja Damjanović (GK) to (Serbia) RK Crvena zvezda
- (Serbia) Momčilo Simić (LP) to (Serbia) RK Crvena zvezda

=== Transfer History ===
Transfers for the 2025–26 season

Joining

- (Montenegro) Luka Barjaktarović (LB) from (Serbia) RK Partizan
- (Slovenia) Nik Ćirović (LB) from (Slovenia) RK Celje
- (Serbia) Nikola Kovačević (LB) from (Serbia) RK Rudar Kostolac
- (Serbia) Đorđe Pisarić (CB) from (Romania) SCM Politehnica Timișoara

Leaving

- (Georgia (country)) Miriani Gavashelishvili (LB) to (Poland) KPR Ostrovia
- (Bosnia and Herzegovina) Domagoj Alilović (CB) to (Hungary) Csurgói KK
- (Serbia) Mateja Dodić (RW) to (Croatia) RK Zagreb
- (Serbia) Uroš Pavlović (LP) to (France) US Créteil Handball
- (Serbia) Borivoje Djukic (LB) to (Spain) Ángel Ximénez Puente Genil
- (Serbia) Milan Dakić (CB) to (Serbia) RK Vranje
- (Serbia) Nikola Kovačević (LB) to (Hungary) Carbonex-Komló

== Previous squads ==
2015–2016 Team
Shirt No	Nationality	Player	Birth Date	Position
1	Serbia	Ivan Maksimović	11 April 1989 (age 37)	Goalkeeper
3	Serbia	Miloš Savić	18 May 1996 (age 30)	Right Back
4	Serbia	Nemanja Milovanović	11 May 1995 (age 31)	Left Back
6	Serbia	Vuk Stevanović	2 June 1994 (age 32)	Central Back
7	Montenegro	Miodrag Kažić	27 July 1977 (age 49)	Right Winger
8	Serbia	Marko Došen	5 August 1998 (age 28)	Line Player
9	Serbia	Milan Marinović	19 September 1995 (age 31)	Right Winger
10	Serbia	Stefan Ilić	10 October 1992 (age 34)	Left Back
11	Serbia	Radovan Ostojić	21 June 1993 (age 33)	Central Back
12	Serbia	Milan Bomaštar	10 July 1999 (age 27)	Goalkeeper
15	Serbia	Nikola Marković	15 April 1998 (age 28)	Central Back
16	Serbia	Darko Arsić	26 January 1989 (age 37)	Goalkeeper
18	Serbia	Nikola Jezdimirović	23 March 1993 (age 33)	Left Back
19	Serbia	Miloš Mitrović	13 August 1985 (age 41)	Left Winger
20	Serbia	Milutin Dragićević	21 April 1983 (age 43)	Line Player
21	Serbia	Vladimir Jevtić	19 November 1995 (age 30)	Line Player
22	Serbia	Mladen Ivanović	27 February 1982 (age 44)	Right Winger
23	Serbia	Vladimir Bojanić	16 March 1994 (age 32)	Line Player
24	Serbia	Petar Petrović	17 November 1991 (age 34)	Left Winger
58	Georgia	Sergo Datukashvili	28 April 1978 (age 48)	Left Back

2013–2014 Team
Shirt No	Nationality	Player	Birth Date	Position
1	Serbia	Ivan Maksimović	11 April 1989 (age 37)	Goalkeeper
2	Serbia	Strahinja Travar	7 April 1989 (age 37)	Left Back
3	SerbiaHungary	József Holpert	1 June 1988 (age 38)	Left Winger
4	Serbia	Nemanja Milovanović	11 May 1995 (age 31)	Left Back
5	Serbia	Nemanja Aleksić	18 May 1984 (age 42)	Line Player
6	Serbia	Vuk Stevanović	2 June 1994 (age 32)	Central Back
8	Serbia	Bojan Palević	4 August 1992 (age 34)	Left Back
9	Serbia	Filip Marjanović	10 February 1989 (age 37)	Left Winger
10	SerbiaMontenegro	Branko Kankaraš	28 May 1988 (age 38)	Line Player
11	Serbia	Bogdan Medurić	25 June 1988 (age 38)	Line Player
12	Serbia	Borislav Vladisavljević	31 March 1985 (age 41)	Goalkeeper
14	Serbia	Nemanja Obradović	8 January 1991 (age 35)	Left Back
15	Serbia	Miloš Marković	27 May 1989 (age 37)	Right Winger
16	Serbia	Darko Arsić	26 January 1989 (age 37)	Goalkeeper
17	Montenegro	Nemanja Grujicić	25 March 1989 (age 37)	Right Back
18	Serbia	Nikola Jezdimirović	23 March 1993 (age 33)	Left Back
19	Serbia	Miloš Mitrović	13 August 1985 (age 41)	Left Winger
21	Serbia	Vladimir Jevtić	19 November 1995 (age 30)	Line Player
22	Serbia	Miloš Prodanović	21 October 1987 (age 39)	Central Back
23	Serbia	Vladimir Bojanić	16 March 1994 (age 32)	Line Player
24	Serbia	Žikica Milosavljević	14 January 1972 (age 54)	Right Winger
33	Serbia	Miloš Dragaš	11 June 1990 (age 36)	Left Back

1985–1986 Team
Shirt No	Nationality	Player	Birth Date	Position
1	Yugoslavia	Branislav Đukanović	27 September 1956 (age 70)	Goalkeeper
2	Yugoslavia	Zlatko Portner	16 January 1962 (age 64)	Central Back
3	Yugoslavia	Veselin Vuković	19 December 1958 (age 67)	Line Player
4	Yugoslavia	Miroslav Ignjatović	25 January 1959 (age 67)	Left Back
5	Yugoslavia	Dragan Tanasić	26 July 1958 (age 68)	Line Player
6	Yugoslavia	Pero Milošević	18 October 1961 (age 65)	Central Back
7	Yugoslavia	Jasmin Mrkonja	9 October 1958 (age 68)	Right Winger
8	Yugoslavia	Veselin Vujović	18 January 1961 (age 65)	Left Back
9	Yugoslavia	Mile Isaković	17 January 1958 (age 68)	Left Winger
10	Yugoslavia	Jovica Cvetković	18 September 1959 (age 67)	Right Back
11	Yugoslavia	Slobodan Kuzmanovski	11 July 1962 (age 64)	Right Back
12	Yugoslavia	Mirko Bašić	14 September 1960 (age 66)	Goalkeeper
15	Yugoslavia	Vladica Spasojević	22 June 1964 (age 62)	Left Winger
16	Yugoslavia	Dejan Lukić	12 March 1962 (age 64)	Goalkeeper

1984–1985 Team
Shirt No	Nationality	Player	Birth Date	Position
1	Yugoslavia	Branislav Đukanović	27 September 1956 (age 70)	Goalkeeper
2	Yugoslavia	Zlatko Portner	16 January 1962 (age 64)	Central Back
3	Yugoslavia	Veselin Vuković	19 December 1958 (age 67)	Line Player
4	Yugoslavia	Miroslav Ignjatović	25 January 1959 (age 67)	Left Back
5	Yugoslavia	Dragan Tanasić	26 July 1958 (age 68)	Line Player
6	Yugoslavia	Pero Milošević	18 October 1961 (age 65)	Central Back
7	Yugoslavia	Jasmin Mrkonja	9 October 1958 (age 68)	Right Winger
8	Yugoslavia	Veselin Vujović	18 January 1961 (age 65)	Left Back
9	Yugoslavia	Mile Isaković	17 January 1958 (age 68)	Left Winger
10	Yugoslavia	Jovica Cvetković	18 September 1959 (age 67)	Right Back
11	Yugoslavia	Slobodan Kuzmanovski	11 July 1962 (age 64)	Right Back
12	Yugoslavia	Mirko Bašić	14 September 1960 (age 66)	Goalkeeper
15	Yugoslavia	Vladica Spasojević	22 June 1964 (age 62)	Left Winger
16	Yugoslavia	Dejan Lukić	12 March 1962 (age 64)	Goalkeeper

== Honours ==
=== Domestic ===
- Yugoslav League
  - 1981–82, 1982–83, 1983–84, 1984–85, 1985–86, 1986–87, 1987–88
- Yugoslav Cup / Serbian Cup
  - 1979–80, 1982–83, 1983–84, 1985–86 / 2015–16, 2021–22

=== European ===
- European Cup / EHF Champions League
  - 1984–85, 1985–86

=== Individual club awards ===
- Double
  - 1982–83, 1983–84, 1984–85
- Triple
  - 1985–86

== European record ==
=== European Cup and Champions League ===
Season	Round	Club	Home	Away	Aggregate
1984–85; Winners	Round 2	(Czech Republic) TJ Škoda Plzeň	36–18	28–26	64–44
1984–85; Winners	Quarter-finals	(Romania) Steaua București	24–19	20–18	44–37
1984–85; Winners	Semi-finals	(Iceland) FH	32–17	30–21	62–38
1984–85; Winners	Finals	(Spain) Atlético Madrid	19–12	30–20	49–32
1985–86; Winners	Round 2	(Socialist Federal Republic of Yugoslavia) Borac Banja Luka	26–18	22–26	48–44
1985–86; Winners	Quarter-finals	(East Germany) SC Magdeburg	38–26	25–23	63–49
1985–86; Winners	Semi-finals	(Romania) Steaua București	23–17	22–24	45–41
1985–86; Winners	Finals	(Poland) Wybrzeże Gdańsk	30–23	24–29	54–52

=== EHF ranking ===
As of 3/3/2023

Rank	Team	Points
170	(Poland) Gwardia Opole	22
171	(Italy) SSV Brixen	22
172	(Faroe Islands) H71 Tórshavn	22
173	(Serbia) RK Metaloplastika	21
174	(Serbia) RK Železničar 1949	21
175	(Belgium) HC Achilles Bocholt	21
176	(Estonia) Viljandi HC	20

- (Serbia) Darko Arsić (2005–2016, 2018, 2021–)
- (Serbia) (Croatia) Mirko Bašić (1980–1989)
- (Serbia) (Slovenia) Tettey Banfro (1987–1991)
- (Serbia) Milan Bomaštar (2016–2021)
- (Serbia) Jovica Cvetković (1984–1985)
- (Serbia) Zoran Đorđić (1986–1992)
- (Serbia) Miloš Dragaš (2010–2012, 2013–2014)
- (Serbia) Milutin Dragićević (2002–2005, 2014–2017)
- (Serbia) Nebojša Golić (1997–1999)
- (Serbia) Đorđe Golubović (2016)
- (Serbia) Nikola Isailović (2003–2009)
- (Serbia) Mile Isaković (1973–1986, 1987–1988)
- (Serbia) Milan Jovanović (2023–)
- (Serbia) Nedeljko Jovanović (1988–1991)
- (Serbia) (Montenegro) Branko Kankaraš (2013–2014, 2023–)
- (Serbia) Slobodan Kuzmanovski (–1989)
- (Serbia) (France) Dejan Lukić (–1986)
- (Serbia) Filip Marjanović (2009–2014)
- (Serbia) (Hungary) Vladan Matić (1987–1993)
- (Serbia) (Bosnia and Herzegovina) Muhamed Memić (1979–1980)
- (Serbia) Milan Milić (2018–2020)
- (Serbia) Žikica Milosavljević (2013–2014)
- (Serbia) Jasmin Mrkonja (1983–1987)
- (Serbia) Nemanja Obradović (2013–2015)
- (Serbia) (Switzerland) Zlatko Portner (1982–1989)
- (Serbia) Dane Šijan (1991–1998)
- (Serbia) Nebojša Stojinović (1985–1999)
- (Serbia) Predrag Vejin (2010–2013)
- (Serbia) Vukašin Vorkapić (2016–2021)
- (Serbia) (Montenegro) Veselin Vujović (1979–1988)
- (Serbia) Veselin Vuković (1975–1986)
- (Serbia) (Greece) Sasa Zivoulovic (1996–1998)
- (Croatia) Zoran Mikulić (1986–1990)
- (Georgia (country)) Sergo Datukashvili (2000, 2015–2016)
- (Montenegro) Goran Đukanović (2002–2003)
- (Montenegro) Ratko Đurković (1995–1997)
- (Montenegro) Božidar Leković (2013–2014)

=== Former coaches ===
Seasons	Coach	Country
–2015	Slavko Novaković	(Serbia)
2015–2016	Veselin Vuković	(Serbia)
2016-2017	Nedeljko Matić	(Serbia)
2017-2018	Vladan Jordović	(Serbia)
2018-2019	Djordje Teodorovic	(Serbia)
2019–2021	Veselin Vuković	(Serbia)
2021–2022	Miodrag Kažić	(Serbia)
2022–	Vladan Matić	(Serbia) (Hungary)
