= 1986 World Men's Handball Championship =

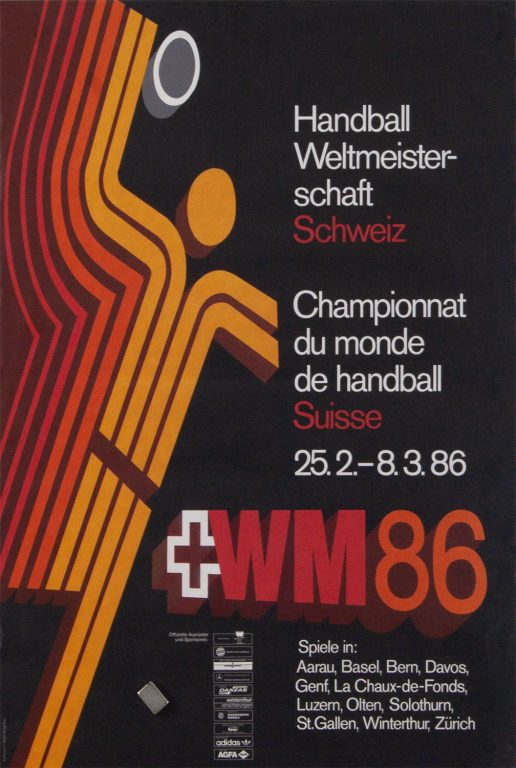
- Poster of the WC 1986

Tournament details
- Host country: Switzerland
- Dates: 25 February – 8 March
- Teams: 16

Final positions
- Champions: Yugoslavia (1st title)
- Runner-up: Hungary
- Third place: East Germany
- Fourth place: Sweden

Tournament statistics
- Matches played: 54
- Goals scored: 2,388 (44.22 per match)
- Top scorer(s): (South Korea) Kang Jae-won (67 goals)

The 1986 World Men's Handball Championship was the 11th team handball World Championship. It was held in Switzerland from February 25 to March 8, 1986. Yugoslavia won the championship. The tournament was played in Aarau, Basel, Bern, La Chaux-de-Fonds, Davos, Geneva, Luzern, Olten, St. Gallen, Solothurn, Winterthur and Zürich.

== Qualification ==
Competition	Vacancies	Qualified
Host nation	1	Switzerland
1984 Summer Olympics	6	Yugoslavia; West Germany; Romania; Denmark; Sweden; Iceland
1985 World Men's Handball Championship Group B	6	East Germany; Soviet Union; Poland; Czechoslovakia; Hungary; Spain
Asian Qualification Tournament	1	South Korea
1985 African Men's Handball Championship	1	Algeria
1985 Pan American Men's Handball Championship	1	Cuba

== Teams ==
Group A	Group B	Group C	Group D
Cuba	Poland	Czechoslovakia	Algeria
East Germany	Spain	Iceland	Denmark
Soviet Union	Switzerland	Romania	Hungary
Yugoslavia	West Germany	South Korea	Sweden

== Preliminary round ==
=== Group A ===
Pos	Team	Pld	W	D	L	GF	GA	GD	Pts	Qualification
1	Yugoslavia	3	3	0	0	80	70	+10	6	Main round
2	East Germany	3	2	0	1	71	64	+7	4	Main round
3	Soviet Union	3	1	0	2	73	72	+1	2	Main round
4	Cuba	3	0	0	3	75	93	−18	0	Ranking round

Source: IHF

25 February 1986; 19:00	East Germany	28–24	Cuba	Aarau
25 February 1986; 19:00		(15–11)		Aarau

25 February 1986; 20:45	Yugoslavia	26–22	Soviet Union	Aarau
25 February 1986; 20:45		(13–11)		Aarau

27 February 1986; 18:15	Yugoslavia	32–28	Cuba	Davos
27 February 1986; 18:15		(15–13)		Davos

27 February 1986; 20:00	East Germany	23–18	Soviet Union	Davos
27 February 1986; 20:00		(10–13)		Davos

28 February 1986; 19:00	Yugoslavia	22–20	East Germany	Lucerne
28 February 1986; 19:00		(10–9)		Lucerne

28 February 1986; 20:45	Soviet Union	33–23	Cuba	Lucerne
28 February 1986; 20:45		(13–12)		Lucerne

=== Group B ===
Pos	Team	Pld	W	D	L	GF	GA	GD	Pts	Qualification
1	West Germany	3	3	0	0	57	51	+6	6	Main round
2	Switzerland (H)	3	1	1	1	50	50	0	3	Main round
3	Spain	3	0	2	1	49	53	−4	2	Main round
4	Poland	3	0	1	2	57	59	−2	1	Ranking round

Source: IHF
(H) Hosts

25 February 1986; 20:00	Switzerland	15–15	Spain	St. Gallen
25 February 1986; 20:00		(4–8)		St. Gallen

25 February 1986; 20:45	West Germany	21–20	Poland	Zürich
25 February 1986; 20:45		(8–8)		Zürich

26 February 1986; 20:00	Switzerland	18–17	Poland	St. Gallen
26 February 1986; 20:00		(10–11)		St. Gallen

26 February 1986; 20:45	West Germany	18–14	Spain	Bern
26 February 1986; 20:45		(11–8)		Bern

28 February 1986; 20:45	Poland	20–20	Spain	Winterthur
28 February 1986; 20:45		(11–12)		Winterthur

28 February 1986; 20:45	West Germany	18–17	Switzerland	Basel
28 February 1986; 20:45		(8–10)		Basel

=== Group C ===
Pos	Team	Pld	W	D	L	GF	GA	GD	Pts	Qualification
1	South Korea	3	2	0	1	76	65	+11	4 (Note: 25% rule: South Korea +8 GD, Romania –1 GD, Iceland –7 GD)	Main round
2	Romania	3	2	0	1	68	64	+4	4	Main round
3	Iceland	3	2	0	1	65	71	−6	4	Main round
4	Czechoslovakia	3	0	0	3	58	67	−9	0	Ranking round

Source: IHF
Notes:

25 February 1986; 19:00	Iceland	21–30	South Korea	Geneva
25 February 1986; 19:00		(9–13)		Geneva

25 February 1986; 20:45	Romania	23–18	Czechoslovakia	Geneva
25 February 1986; 20:45		(8–9)		Geneva

26 February 1986; 19:00	Iceland	19–18	Czechoslovakia	Bern
26 February 1986; 19:00		(10–8)		Bern

26 February 1986; 20:45	Romania	22–21	South Korea	La Chaux-de-Fonds
26 February 1986; 20:45		(15–9)		La Chaux-de-Fonds

28 February 1986; 19:00	Romania	23–25	Iceland	Bern
28 February 1986; 19:00		(13–11)		Bern

28 February 1986; 19:00	South Korea	25–22	Czechoslovakia	Winterthur
28 February 1986; 19:00		(10–13)		Winterthur

=== Group D ===
Pos	Team	Pld	W	D	L	GF	GA	GD	Pts	Qualification
1	Hungary	3	3	0	0	71	62	+9	6	Main round
2	Sweden	3	2	0	1	70	60	+10	4	Main round
3	Denmark	3	1	0	2	69	67	+2	2	Main round
4	Algeria	3	0	0	3	53	74	−21	0	Ranking round

Source: IHF

25 February 1986; 18:00	Sweden	24–16	Algeria	St Gallen
25 February 1986; 18:00		(11–8)		St Gallen

25 February 1986; 19:00	Hungary	25–21	Denmark	Zürich
25 February 1986; 19:00		(11–8)		Zürich

27 February 1986; 19:00	Denmark	27–18	Algeria	Zürich
27 February 1986; 19:00		(13–8)		Zürich

27 February 1986; 20:45	Hungary	23–22	Sweden	Zürich
27 February 1986; 20:45		(9–12)		Zürich

28 February 1986; 19:00	Hungary	23–19	Algeria	Basel
28 February 1986; 19:00		(12–13)		Basel

28 February 1986; 20:45	Sweden	24–21	Denmark	Bern
28 February 1986; 20:45		(12–11)		Bern

== Ranking round ==
Pos	Team	Pld	W	D	L	GF	GA	GD	Pts
13	Czechoslovakia	3	3	0	0	74	64	+10	6
14	Poland	3	2	0	1	77	69	+8	4
15	Cuba	3	1	0	2	71	78	−7	2
16	Algeria	3	0	0	3	66	77	−11	0

Source: IHF

2 March 1986; 17:00	Cuba	23–27	Czechoslovakia	Solothurn
2 March 1986; 17:00		(9–16)		Solothurn

2 March 1986; 17:00	Poland	28–23	Algeria	La Chaux-de-Fonds
2 March 1986; 17:00		(13–6)		La Chaux-de-Fonds

4 March 1986; 19:00	Cuba	25–24	Algeria	Winterthur
4 March 1986; 19:00		(10–16)		Winterthur

4 March 1986; 19:00	Poland	22–23	Czechoslovakia	Geneva
4 March 1986; 19:00		(13–10)		Geneva

6 March 1986; 19:00	Czechoslovakia	24–19	Algeria	Lucerne
6 March 1986; 19:00		(9-8)		Lucerne

6 March 1986; 19:00	Poland	27–23	Cuba	Aarau
6 March 1986; 19:00		(16 - 10)		Aarau

== Main round ==
=== Group I ===
Pos	Team	Pld	W	D	L	GF	GA	GD	Pts	Qualification
1	Yugoslavia	5	5	0	0	112	95	+17	10	Final
2	East Germany	5	3	0	2	109	92	+17	6	Third place game
3	Spain	5	2	1	2	92	87	+5	5	Fifth place game
4	West Germany	5	2	0	3	88	97	−9	4 (Note: 25% rule: West Germany –8 GD, Soviet Union –14 GD)	Seventh place game
5	Soviet Union	5	2	0	3	104	109	−5	4	Ninth place game
6	Switzerland (H)	5	0	1	4	82	107	−25	1	Eleventh place game

Source: IHF
(H) Hosts
Notes:

2 March 1986; 16:30	East Germany	23–16	Switzerland	Basel
2 March 1986; 16:30		(11–6)		Basel

2 March 1986; 16:30	Soviet Union	23–20	West Germany	Zürich
2 March 1986; 16:30		(8–10)		Zürich

2 March 1986; 16:30	Yugoslavia	18–17	Spain	Bern
2 March 1986; 16:30		(10–8)		Bern

4 March 1986; 19:00	East Germany	24–15	West Germany	Olten
4 March 1986; 19:00		(11–7)		Olten

4 March 1986; 20:45	Switzerland	19–27	Yugoslavia	Olten
4 March 1986; 20:45		(7–15)		Olten

4 March 1986; 20:45	Soviet Union	17–25	Spain	Lucerne
4 March 1986; 20:45		(8–11)		Lucerne

6 March 1986; 20:45	Yugoslavia	19–17	West Germany	Lucerne
6 March 1986; 20:45		(9–8)		Lucerne

6 March 1986; 20:45	East Germany	19–21	Spain	Bern
6 March 1986; 20:45		(13–11)		Bern

6 March 1986; 20:45	Soviet Union	24–15	Switzerland	St. Gallen
6 March 1986; 20:45		(8–8)		St. Gallen

=== Group II ===
Pos	Team	Pld	W	D	L	GF	GA	GD	Pts	Qualification
1	Hungary	5	5	0	0	122	108	+14	10	Final
2	Sweden	5	4	0	1	112	93	+19	8	Third place game
3	Iceland	5	2	0	3	114	117	−3	4 (Note: 25% rule: Iceland +4 GD, Denmark –16 GD)	Fifth place game
4	Denmark	5	2	0	3	107	117	−10	4	Seventh place game
5	Romania	5	1	0	4	78	93	−15	2 (Note: 25% rule: Romania +1 GD, South Korea –1 GD)	Ninth place game
6	South Korea	5	1	0	4	132	137	−5	2	Eleventh place game

Source: IHF
Notes:

2 March 1986; 14:35	Romania	20–25	Sweden	Aarau
2 March 1986; 14:35		(11–11)		Aarau

2 March 1986; 14:45	Iceland	20–21	Hungary	Zürich
2 March 1986; 14:45		(12–11)		Zürich

2 March 1986; 16:30	South Korea	27–31	Denmark	Aarau
2 March 1986; 16:30		(17–18)		Aarau

4 March 1986; 19:00	Iceland	25–16	Denmark	Lucerne
4 March 1986; 19:00		(10–10)		Lucerne

4 March 1986; 20:45	Romania	17–19	Hungary	Geneva
4 March 1986; 20:45		(9–10)		Geneva

4 March 1986; 20:45	South Korea	26–29	Sweden	Winterthur
4 March 1986; 20:45		(15–12)		Winterthur

6 March 1986; 19:00	South Korea	28–34	Hungary	St. Gallen
6 March 1986; 19:00		(16–16)		St. Gallen

6 March 1986; 19:00	Iceland	23–27	Sweden	Bern
6 March 1986; 19:00		(9–15)		Bern

6 March 1986; 20:45	Romania	16–18	Denmark	Aarau
6 March 1986; 20:45		(7–10)		Aarau

== Final round ==
=== Eleventh place game ===
8 March 1986; 14:30	Switzerland	27–22	South Korea	Zürich
8 March 1986; 14:30		(14–11)		Zürich

=== Ninth place game ===
7 March 1986; 19:00	Romania	25–21	Soviet Union	Olten
7 March 1986; 19:00		(12–10)		Olten

=== Seventh place game ===
7 March 1986; 19:00	West Germany	25–18	Denmark	Basel
7 March 1986; 19:00		(11–10)		Basel

=== Fifth place game ===
7 March 1986; 20:45	Spain	24–22	Iceland	Olten
7 March 1986; 20:45		(10–10)		Olten

=== Third place game ===
7 March 1986; 20:45	East Germany	24–23	Sweden	Basel
7 March 1986; 20:45		(13–11)		Basel

=== Final ===
8 March 1986; 16:30	Yugoslavia	24–22	Hungary	Zürich
8 March 1986; 16:30	Rnić (1), Vuković (1), Saračević (2), Grubić (1), Mrkonja (3), Vujović (4), Cvetković (6), Isaković (6 dont 3 pen.).	(12–12)	P. Kovács (5), M. Kovács (3), Fodor (1), Iváncsik (5), Szabó (1), Horváth (3), Gyurka (2), Marosi (2).	Zürich
8 March 1986; 16:30		Report		Zürich

== Final standings ==
Rank	Team
Gold medal	Yugoslavia
Silver medal	Hungary
Bronze medal	East Germany
4	Sweden
5	Spain
6	Iceland
7	West Germany
8	Denmark
9	Romania
10	Soviet Union
11	Switzerland
12	South Korea
13	Czechoslovakia
14	Poland
15	Cuba
16	Algeria

Qualified for the 1988 Summer Olympics
Qualified for the 1987 World Men's Handball Championship Group B

1986 Men's World Champions

Yugoslavia
First title

== Medal summary ==
Gold	Silver	Bronze
(Socialist Federal Republic of Yugoslavia) Yugoslavia Zlatan Arnautović; Mirko Bašić; Jovica Cvetković; Jovica Elezović; Časlav Grubić; Jožef Holpert; Mile Isaković; Muhamed Memić; Dragan Mladenović; Jasmin Mrkonja; Zlatko Portner; Rolando Pušnik; Momir Rnić; Zlatko Saračević; Veselin Vujović; Veselin Vuković	Hungary Imre Bíró; József Bordás; Viktor Debre; János Fodor; János Gyurka; László Hoffmann; Gábor Horváth; Mihály Iváncsik; József Kenyeres; Zsolt Kontra; Mihály Kovács; Péter Kovács; László Marosi; Tibor Oross; László Szabó	East Germany Heiko Bonath; Rüdiger Borchardt; Stephan Hauck; Peter Hofmann; Andreas Köckeritz; Hartmut Krüger; Andreas Nagora; Peter Pysall; Gunnar Schimrock; Wieland Schmidt; Dirk Schnell; Klaus-Dieter Schulz; Frank-Michael Wahl; Ingolf Wiegert; Holger Winselmann; Thomas Zeise

== Top goalscorers ==
Rank	Player	Goals
1	(South Korea) Kang Jae-won	67
2	(Cuba) Roberto Julián Duranona	50
3	(Sweden) Björn Jilsén	47
4	(Hungary) Péter Kovács	45
5	(Iceland) Kristján Arason	41
6	(East Germany) Ingolf Wiegert	40
6	(Romania) Maricel Voinea	40
8	(Socialist Federal Republic of Yugoslavia) Jovica Cvetković	37
9	(Denmark) Michael Fenger	35
9	(Switzerland) Peter Weber	35
