= 1988–89 División de Honor de Balonmano =

División de Honor
- Season: 1988–89

The 1988–89 División de Honor de Balonmano season was the 31st since its establishment. FC Barcelona were the defending champions, having won the previous season.

== League table ==
=== First Round ===
Second Round (title)
Second Round (permanence)

==== Group A ====
	Team	P	W	D	L	G+	G−	Pts
1	At. Madrid	14	10	2	2	330	281	22
2	FC Barcelona	14	10	0	4	362	283	20
3	Elgorriaga	14	9	1	4	321	330	19
4	Lagisa	14	8	2	4	356	334	18
5	Troll V. Avilés	14	7	0	7	342	364	14
6	TNT Uniexpress	14	4	2	8	334	357	10
7	Puleva	14	4	1	9	336	340	9
8	Tenerife	14	0	0	14	272	394	0

==== Group B ====
	Team	P	W	D	L	G+	G−	Pts
1	Teka	14	10	1	3	362	275	21
2	Cacaolat	14	10	1	3	378	320	21
3	Cajamadrid	14	10	0	4.	357	318	20
4	Caixa Valencia	14	10	0	4	360	324	20
5	Michelín	14	6	2	6	333	354	14
6	Palautotdera	14	3.	0	11	327	386	6
7	Arrate	14	2	1	11	307	364	5
8	H. Alacant	14	2	1	11	284	367	5

=== Second round ===
In–Out promotion
Relegated

==== Title group ====
	Team	P	W	D	L	G+	G−	Pts
1	Barcelona	14	10	2	2	323	278	22
2	Teka	14	9	2	3	308	276	20
3	CaJamadrid	14	9	2	3	341	297	20
4	Cacaolat Gr.	14	8	1	5	329	299	17
5	At. MadrId	14	7	3	4	275	271	17
6	Caixa Valencia	14	4	2	8	291	324	10
7	Elgorriaga.	14	3	0	11	292	336	6
8	Lagisa C.N.	14	0	0	14	281	385	0

==== Permanence group ====
	Team	P	W	D	L	G+	G−	Pts
9	Uniexpress	14	9	1	4	349	333	19
10	Michelín	14	8	1	5	346	305	17
11	Helados Al.	14	7	1	6	331	315	15
12	Puleva Málaga	14	7	1	6	356	353	15
13	Arrate	14	7	1	6	313	317	15
14	Palautordera	14	7	1	6	319	339	15
15	Tenerife T.M.	14	4	1	9	354	385	9
16	Avilés	14	4	0	10	322	343	8
