= Peter Weber (handballer) =

Swiss handball player

Personal information
- Nationality: Swiss
- Born: 27 March 1962
- Died: October 1999 (aged 37)

Sport
- Sport: Handball

Senior clubs
- Years: Team
- –: TV Zofingen
- –: RTV 1879 Basel
National team
- Years: Team
- 1980s: Switzerland

Peter Weber (27 March 1962 – October 1999) was a Swiss handball player. He competed at the 1984 Summer Olympics.
