= Milan Kalina =

Serbian handball player (born 1956)

Personal information
- Full name: Milan Kalina
- Nationality: Serbian
- Born: 13 August 1956 (age 70) Belgrade, FPR Yugoslavia
- Height: 1.90 m (6 ft 3 in)

Sport
- Sport: Handball
- Position: Centre back

Senior clubs
- Years: Team
- 1973–1976: Partizan
- –: Dinamo Pančevo
- –: Crvena zvezda
- 1985–1990: Barcelona
National team
- Years: Team
- –: Yugoslavia
Medal record
Men's handball
Representing Yugoslavia
Olympic Games
Gold medal – first place	1984 Los Angeles	Team

Milan Kalina (Serbian Cyrillic: Милан Калина; born 13 August 1956) is a Serbian former handball player who competed for Yugoslavia in the 1984 Summer Olympics.

== Club career ==
After starting out at Partizan, Kalina played for Dinamo Pančevo and Crvena zvezda, before moving abroad. He spent five seasons with Barcelona (1985–1990) and won numerous trophies with the club, including the Cup Winners' Cup.

== International career ==
At international level, Kalina represented Yugoslavia at the 1984 Summer Olympics in Los Angeles, winning the gold medal.

== Honours ==
Barcelona

- Liga ASOBAL: 1985–86, 1987–88, 1988–89, 1989–90
- Copa del Rey: 1987–88, 1989–90
- Cup Winners' Cup: 1985–86
