= Croatian Handball Federation =

Governing body of handball in Croatia

Croatian Handball Federation Croatian: Hrvatski rukometni savez HRS
- IOC nation: Republic of Croatia (CRO)
- Sport: Handball
- Other sports: Beach handball; Wheelchair handball
- Official website: www.hrs.hr

HISTORY
- Preceding organisations: Handball Federation of Yugoslavia
- Year of formation: 19 December 1948; 77 years ago

AFFILIATIONS
- International federation: International Handball Federation (IHF)
- IHF member since: 10 April 1992; 34 years ago
- Continental association: European Handball Federation
- National Olympic Committee: Croatian Olympic Committee
- Other affiliation(s): Mediterranean Handball Confederation

GOVERNING BODY
- President: Mr. Tomislav Grahovac (Croatia)

HEADQUARTERS
- Address: Metalčeva 5/III, Zagreb
- Secretary General: Mr. Damir Poljak (Croatia)

FINANCE
- Sponsors: Molten Corporation; Joma; Hrvatska elektroprivreda Porsche; Jadranski naftovod Lidl; Telemach

The Croatian Handball Federation (Croatian: Hrvatski rukometni savez; abbr. HRS) is the governing body of handball in Croatia. It is based in Zagreb.

It organizes the handball leagues:

- Croatian Men's Premier Handball League
- Croatian Women's First Handball League
- Croatian Second League of Handball

It also organizes the Croatian men's national handball team and the Croatian women's national handball team, as well as the Croatian men's national beach handball team and Croatian women's national beach handball team.

== History ==
The Handball Working Committee was first formed in Zagreb in 1948 and the following year the HRS itself was formed within the Independent State of Croatia. After the Second World War, it was renamed the Handball Federation of Croatia and ceded some powers to the Yugoslav Handball Federation. Upon Croatia's independence from Yugoslavia, the Croatian Handball Federation again represented the country. It joined the European Handball Federation and the International Handball Federation in 1992.

== HRS presidents ==
No.	Name	Tenure
1	Borivoj Vuksan	1948–1951
2	Zlatko Šnajder	1951–1953
3	Mondo Licul	1953–1955
4	Branko Gazivoda	1955–1965
5	Marko Ćosić	1965–1969
6	Miško Juras	1969–1973
7	Branko Gazivoda	1973–1980
8	Mladen Žuvela	1980–1981
9	Krešimir Petanjek	1981–1982
10	Zorislav Šonje	1982–1983
11	Marijan Jakšeković	1983–1984
12	Božidar Košta	1984–1987
13	Tomislav Ribarić	1987–1992
14	Božidar Sušec	1992–1995
15	Željko Kavran	1995–2008
16	Sandi Šola	2008–2016
17	Tomislav Grahovac	2016–present

== Competitions hosted ==
=== International ===
- 1957 World Women's Handball Championship (as part of SFR Yugoslavia)
- 1973 World Women's Handball Championship (as part of SFR Yugoslavia)
- 1979 Women's Junior World Handball Championship (as part of SFR Yugoslavia)
- 1987 Men's Junior World Handball Championship (as part of SFR Yugoslavia)
- 2003 World Women's Handball Championship
- 2009 World Men's Handball Championship
- 2014 Women's Junior World Handball Championship
- 2025 World Men's Handball Championship

=== Continental ===
- 2000 European Men's Handball Championship
- 2011 European Beach Handball Championship
- 2014 European Women's Handball Championship
- 2016 European Men's U-18 Handball Championship
- 2017 European Beach Handball Championship
- 2018 European Men's Handball Championship
