= 1974 World Men's Handball Championship =

Tournament details
- Host country: East Germany
- Dates: 28 February-10 March
- Teams: 16

Final positions
- Champions: Romania
- Runners-up: East Germany
- Third place: Yugoslavia

Tournament statistics
- Matches played: 42
- Goals scored: 1,556 (37.05 per match)

The 1974 World Men's Handball Championship was the eighth team handball World Championship. It was held in East Germany between 28 February-10 March 1974. Romania won the championship, defeating the hosts 14-12 in the final.

== Teams ==
Group A	Group B	Group C	Group D
Czechoslovakia	Poland	East Germany	Algeria
Denmark	Romania	Japan	Bulgaria
Iceland	Spain	Soviet Union	Hungary
West Germany	Sweden	United States	Yugoslavia

== Preliminary round ==
=== Group A ===
Date	Venue	Game	Res.	Half
28 Feb	Karl-Marx-Stadt	Czechoslovakia - Iceland	25-15	(11-6)
28 Feb	Karl-Marx-Stadt	Denmark - West Germany	12-11	(7-5)
1 Mar	Gera	Czechoslovakia - Denmark	16-12	(7-4)
1 Mar	Erfurt	West Germany - Iceland	22-16	(10-7)
3 Mar	Karl-Marx-Stadt	Czechoslovakia - West Germany	17-11	(6-7)
3 Mar	Erfurt	Denmark - Iceland	19-17	(10-10)

Team	Pld	W	D	L	GF	GA	GD	Pts
Czechoslovakia	3	3	0	0	58	38	+20	6
Denmark	3	2	0	1	43	44	−1	4
West Germany	3	1	0	2	44	45	−1	2
Iceland	3	0	0	3	48	66	−18	0

=== Group B ===
Date	Venue	Game	Res.	Half
28 Feb	Schwerin	Romania - Poland	18-14	(10-6)
28 Feb	Schwerin	Spain - Sweden	15-14	(7-9)
1 Mar	Wismar	Poland - Sweden	20-10	(6-5)
1 Mar	Rostock	Romania - Spain	21-11	(12-8)
3 Mar	Schwerin	Sweden - Romania	20-18	(9-8)
3 Mar	Rostock	Poland - Spain	21-15	(11-6)

Team	Pld	W	D	L	GF	GA	GD	Pts
Romania	3	2	0	1	57	45	+12	4
Poland	3	2	0	1	55	43	+12	4
Sweden	3	1	0	2	44	53	−9	2
Spain	3	1	0	2	41	56	−15	2

=== Group C ===
Date	Venue	Game	Res.	Half
28 Feb	East Berlin	East Germany - Japan	31-16	(13-9)
28 Feb	East Berlin	Soviet Union - United States	40-11	(16-6)
1 Mar	Brandenburg an der Havel	East Germany - United States	35-14	(16-6)
1 Mar	Brandenburg an der Havel	Soviet Union - Japan	25-18	(13-7)
3 Mar	East Berlin	East Germany - Soviet Union	15-15	(7-4)
3 Mar	Brandenburg an der Havel	Japan - United States	29-18	(13-9)

Team	Pld	W	D	L	GF	GA	GD	Pts
East Germany	3	2	1	0	81	45	+36	5
Soviet Union	3	2	1	0	80	44	+36	5
Japan	3	1	0	2	63	74	−11	2
United States	3	0	0	3	43	104	−61	0

=== Group D ===
Date	Venue	Game	Res.	Half
28 Feb	Halle an der Saale	Yugoslavia - Bulgaria	25-17	(11-7)
28 Feb	Halle an der Saale	Hungary - Algeria	30-10	(12-5)
1 Mar	Magdeburg	Yugoslavia - Algeria	35-12	(17-7)
1 Mar	Dessau	Hungary - Bulgaria	19-15	(9-7)
3 Mar	Halle an der Saale	Yugoslavia - Hungary	21-18	(9-10)
3 Mar	Dessau	Bulgaria - Algeria	23-16	(10-9)

Team	Pld	W	D	L	GF	GA	GD	Pts
Yugoslavia	3	3	0	0	81	47	+34	6
Hungary	3	2	0	1	67	46	+21	4
Bulgaria	3	1	0	2	55	60	−5	2
Algeria	3	0	0	3	38	88	−50	0

== Placement Round (9-12 pos.) ==
The four third placed teams from the preliminary round played a round robin tournament for positions 9-12.

Date	Venue	Game	Res.	Half
5 Mar	Erfurt	West Germany - Sweden	20-18	(8-3)
5 Mar	Wismar	Bulgaria - Japan	23-22	(13-12)
7 Mar	Magdeburg	West Germany - Japan	30-24	(15-12)
7 Mar	Gera	Sweden - Bulgaria	21-19	(12-8)
9 Mar	Halle an der Saale	West Germany - Bulgaria	22-13	(11-8)
9 Mar	Dessau	Sweden - Japan	28-21	(14-11)

Placement Round		Games	Goals	Points
9.	West Germany	3	72-55	6
10.	Sweden	3	67-60	4
11.	Bulgaria	3	55-65	2
12.	Japan	3	67-81	0

== Second round ==
=== Group 1 ===
Date	Venue	Game	Res.	Half
5 Mar	Karl Marx Stadt	Poland - Czechoslovakia	19-16	(11-6)
5 Mar	Halle an der Saale	Romania - Denmark	20-11	(9-1)
7 Mar	Schwerin	Romania - Czechoslovakia	20-13	(11-6)
7 Mar	Karl Marx Stadt	Poland - Denmark	14-9	(6-5)

Team	Pld	W	D	L	GF	GA	GD	Pts
Romania	3	3	0	0	58	38	+20	6
Poland	3	2	0	1	47	43	+4	4
Czechoslovakia	3	1	0	2	45	51	−6	2
Denmark	3	0	0	3	32	50	−18	0

=== Group 2 ===
Date	Venue	Game	Res.	Half
5 Mar	Schwerin	East Germany - Hungary	17-10	(10-4)
5 Mar	Magdeburg	Yugoslavia - Soviet Union	18-15	(11-8)
7 Mar	East Berlin	East Germany - Yugoslavia	19-17	(10-8)
7 Mar	Dessau	Soviet Union - Hungary	17-15	(8-7)

Team	Pld	W	D	L	GF	GA	GD	Pts
East Germany	3	2	1	0	51	42	+9	5
Yugoslavia	3	2	0	1	56	52	+4	4
Soviet Union	3	1	1	1	47	48	−1	3
Hungary	3	0	0	3	43	55	−12	0

== 7th / 8th place ==
Date	Match^{1}			Score	Half
09.03.1974	Hungary	-	Denmark	22-15	(13-6)

- (^{1}) - In East Berlin

== 5th / 6th place ==
Date	Match^{1}			Score	Half
10.03.1974	Soviet Union	-	Czechoslovakia	26-24	(14-11)

- (^{1}) - In East Berlin

== 3rd / 4th place ==
Date	Match^{1}			Score	Half
09.03.1974	Yugoslavia	-	Poland	18-16	(10-9)

- (^{1}) - In East Berlin

== Final ==
Date	Match^{1}			Score	Half
10.03.1974	Romania	-	East Germany	14-12	(7-8)

- (^{1}) - In East Berlin

== Final standings ==
Rank	Team
Gold medal	Romania
Silver medal	East Germany
Bronze medal	Yugoslavia
4	Poland
5	Soviet Union
6	Czechoslovakia
7	Hungary
8	Denmark
9	West Germany
10	Sweden
11	Bulgaria
12	Japan
13	Spain
14	Iceland
15	Algeria
16	United States

Source: International Handball Federation
