= Yugoslavia men's national handball team =

Former national basketball team

Yugoslavia (Socialist Federal Republic of Yugoslavia)

Information
- Nickname: Blues
- Association: Handball Federation of Yugoslavia

Colours
1st	2nd

Results

Summer Olympics
- Appearances: 5 (First in 1972)
- Best result: 1st (1972 and 1984)

World Championship
- Appearances: 10 (First in 1958)
- Best result: 1st (1986)
- Last updated on Unknown.

Yugoslavia men's national handball team
Medal record

Olympic Games
Gold medal – first place	1972 Munich	Team
Gold medal – first place	1984 Los Angeles	Team
Bronze medal – third place	1988 Seoul	Team

World Championship
Gold medal – first place	1986 Switzerland	
Silver medal – second place	1982 West Germany	
Bronze medal – third place	1970 France	
Bronze medal – third place	1974 East Germany	

Goodwill Games
Silver medal – second place	1990 Seattle	

Mediterranean Games
Gold medal – first place	1967 Tunis	
Gold medal – first place	1975 Algiers	
Gold medal – first place	1979 Split	
Gold medal – first place	1983 Casablanca	
Gold medal – first place	1991 Athens	

The Yugoslavia national handball team was the national handball team of Yugoslavia. It was organized by the Handball Federation of Yugoslavia. The Yugoslav national handball team was made up of a handball players from the separate regions of the then SFR Yugoslavia (Bosnia and Herzegovina, Croatia, Macedonia, Montenegro, Serbia, and Slovenia).

== History ==
The Handball Federation of Yugoslavia (RSJ) was founded on December 17, 1949 in Belgrade by merging republican and provincial federations, and became a member of the International Handball Federation (IHF) in 1950.

=== Field handball first match ===
The first international match, played on June 19, 1950 at the stadium in Kranchevicheva Street in Zagreb, against Belgium. Yugoslavia won 18:3 playing with nine players from Zagreb and one each from Sarajevo and Split.Small handball was played publicly for the first time in Yugoslav territories on February 24, 1950, in the Fair hall (today the Technical Museum) on Savska aley in Zagreb. It was the first public handball match played in the hall.

=== Indoor Handball ===
In the beginning, small handball was mainly played on open courts, and later more and more in halls. The possibility of playing in the hall and in a smaller space enabled continuous changes in the situation on the field and better contact with the spectators. That's why small handball was quickly accepted, and thus slowly supplanted big handball, which was played less and less.Until 1953, all official handball competitions in Yugoslavia were in large handball, and since then national championships in small handball have also been held. The main limiting factor in the further development of handball was football fields, whose administrations were reluctant to approve the holding of training sessions and matches. Big handball stopped being played officially in 1958. The only remaining handball, there was no longer any need to call it small handball, but simply - handball.

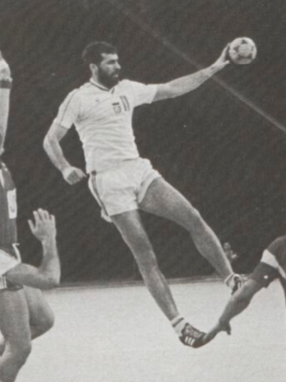
Slobodan Kuzmanovski scored 400 goals in 150 matches for the national team

=== Modern Handball ===
Yugoslavia played its first international small handball match in 1956 at the Tashmaidan Stadium in Belgrade against Sweden, the current world champions at the time. A draw was reached 6:6, and due to cloud cover the match was declared invalid. Yugoslav handball began to rise in the early 1970s reaching its height until 1990. At the time it was the most-winning handball team in the world, winning three medals at the Olympic Games, four at the World Championships, five at the Mediterranean Games, one at the Goodwill Games, three at the World Handball Cups and two at the Handball Super Leagues. The biggest successes are the gold medals at the 1972 and 1984 Olympic Games, as well as the gold medal at the 1986 World Championship.

=== Following the breakup ===
The team ceased to exist after the split of Yugoslavia in June 1991. Three former Yugoslav republics have since gone on to win medals at major competitions: Croatia sixteen, Serbia four and Slovenia two. Croatia is considered one of the best teams in international handball, winning the gold medal at the 2004 Summer Olympics and the 2003 World Championship, in addition to consistently earning major championship medals to this day (as of 2026).

== Accomplishments ==
=== Summer Olympics ===
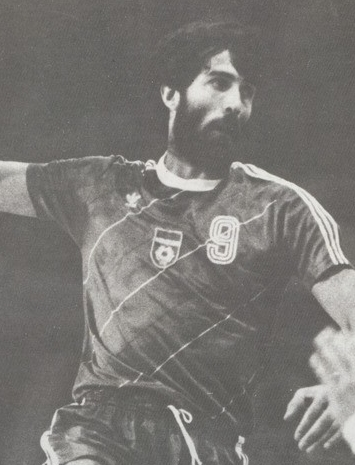
Veselin Vujovich Jump Shot Landmark

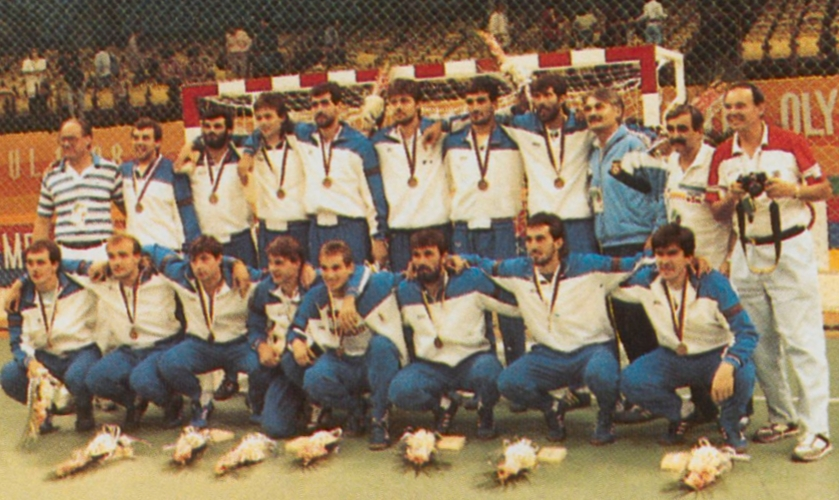
Yugoslav team with the bronze medal at the 1988 Olympics

Year	Round	Position	Pld	W	D	L	GF	GA	GD
(Nazi Germany) 1936	didn't have indoor handball team								
(West Germany) 1972	Final	1st place, gold medalist(s)	6	6	0	0	122	89	+33
(Canada) 1976	Fifth place game	5th	6	5	0	1	131	112	+19
(Soviet Union) 1980	Fifth place game	6th	6	4	0	2	155	116	+39
(United States) 1984	Final	1st place, gold medalist(s)	6	5	1	0	141	93	+48
(South Korea) 1988	Bronze medal game	3rd place, bronze medalist(s)	6	4	1	1	143	132	+11
(Spain) 1992	Qualified for the 1992 Summer Olympics but banned due to UN sanctions								
Total	Qualified: 6/6		30	24	2	4	692	542	+120

=== World Championship ===
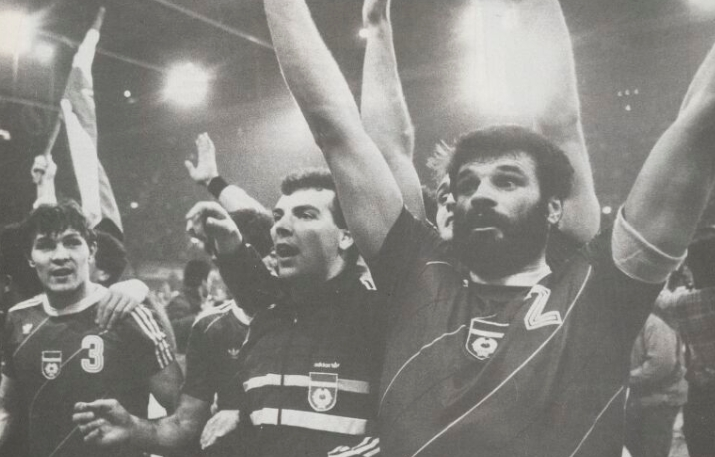
Yugoslav team after winning the 1986 World Championship

Year	Round	Position	Pld	W	D	L	GF	GA	GD
(Nazi Germany) 1938	didn't have indoor handball team								
(Sweden) 1954	didn't have indoor handball team								
(Germany) 1958	Main Round	8th	6	2	0	4	101	96	+5
(West Germany) 1961	Preliminary Round	9th	2	0	0	2	29	32	-3
(Czechoslovakia) 1964	Main Round	6th	6	2	2	2	102	96	+6
(Sweden) 1967	Quarterfinal	7th	6	4	0	2	136	110	+26
(France) 1970	Semifinal	3rd place, bronze medalist(s)	6	3	1	2	119	80	+39
(East Germany) 1974	Semifinal	3rd place, bronze medalist(s)	6	5	0	1	134	97	+37
(Denmark) 1978	Main Round	5th	6	4	1	1	108	96	+12
(West Germany) 1982	Final	2nd place, silver medalist(s)	7	4	1	2	183	155	+28
(Switzerland) 1986	Final	1st place, gold medalist(s)	7	7	0	0	168	145	+23
(Czechoslovakia) 1990	Main Round	4th	7	4	0	3	169	156	+13
(Sweden) 1993	Qualified but Team Dissolved in 1992	Banned							
Total	Qualified: 11/11		59	35	5	19	1249	1063	+186

=== World Outdoor Championship ===
- 1955 (West Germany) IHF World Men's Outdoor Handball Championship - 5th place

=== Goodwill Games ===
Games	Round	Position
(Soviet Union) 1986 Moscow	Didn't Participate	
(United States) 1990 Seattle	Final	2nd of 8
Total	0/1	0 Titles

=== Mediterranean Games ===
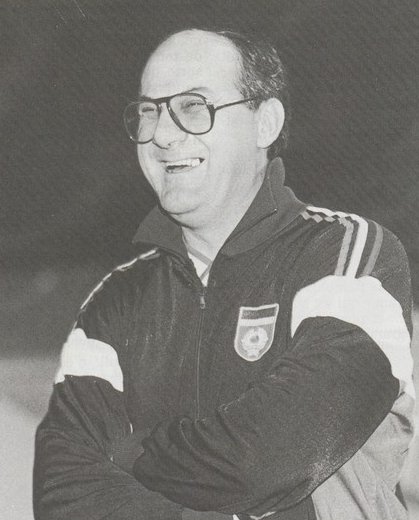
Abas Arslanagich Legendary Player and Coach

Games	Round	Position
(Tunisia) 1967 Tunis	Champions	1st of 4
(Turkey) 1971 İzmir	Tournament canceled	
(Algeria) 1975 Algiers	Champions	1st of 5
(Socialist Federal Republic of Yugoslavia) 1979 Split	Champions	1st of 7
(Morocco) 1983 Casablanca	Champions	1st of 8
(Syria) 1987 Latakia	Didn't Participate	
(Greece) 1991 Athens	Champions	1st of 8
Total	5/5	5 Titles

=== Other competitions ===
==== EURO Tournaments ====
World Cup (European Tournament)

The World Cup was a handball tournament for men's national teams that was held from 1971 to 2010 in Sweden, partly in Norway in 1999 and partly in Germany in 2006. The event took place irregularly, most recently in even years, alternating with the Supercup tournament in Germany. The Norwegian oil company Statoil has been the sponsor since 2004, and the cup competition has since been called the Statoil World Cup. The World Cup was considered a mini European Cup because, in addition to hosts Sweden, the best seven teams from the previous World Cup which were all European were invited at times. Due to declining audience interest, the event was discontinued in 2010.

EURO - World Cup Swedish Tournament	Round	Position
(Sweden) EURO World Cup 1971 Stockholm	Champions	(gold) of 8
(Sweden) EURO World Cup 1974 Stockholm	Champions	(gold) of 8
(Sweden) EURO World Cup 1979 Stockholm	7th place	7th of 8
(Sweden) EURO World Cup 1984 Stockholm	3rd place	(bronze) of 8
(Sweden) EURO World Cup 1988 Stockholm	5th place	5th of 8
(Sweden) EURO World Cup 1992 Stockholm	Runner up	(silver) of 8
Total	2/6	2 Titles

EURO Supercup

The Supercup was a handball tournament for men's national teams that was held every two years in the Federal Republic of Germany from 1979 to 2015 - since 1983 usually between the end of October and the beginning of November. The first tournament was held in December 1979, the second was played in early February 1981, the 1997 competition was postponed to March 1998. Previous Olympic champions, world champions and European champions were initially invited. Because of this high-caliber group of participants, it was sometimes referred to as the Mini European Cup. Most recently it took place alternating with the Statoil World Cup. The Supercup goes back to a suggestion by the then national coach Vlado Stenzel. It was held for the last time in 2015 due to a lack of spectator interest.

EURO - Supercup German Tournament	Round	Position
(Germany) EURO Supercup 1979 Dortmund	4th place	4th of 8
(Germany) EURO Supercup 1981 Dortmund	3rd place	(bronze) of 8
(Germany) EURO Supercup 1983 Dortmund	3rd place	(bronze) of 8
(Germany) EURO Supercup 1985 Dortmund	5th place	5th of 8
(Germany) EURO Supercup 1987 Dortmund	5th place	5th of 8
(Germany) EURO Supercup 1989 Dortmund	4th place	4th of 8
(Germany) EURO Supercup 1991 Frankfurt	6th place	6th of 6
Total	0/7	0 Titles

=== Rivalries ===
Team Yugoslavia had two major rivalries. The big one with team USSR and the other one with Eastern Germany team. Their clashes for medals at the Olympics Handball, World Championships and Mini EURO tournaments were epic from 1970 onwards. While at the Mediterranean Games handball the rivals that put the most resistance were team Spain and team Algeria although team Yugoslavia always managed to win the matches for gold medal collecting all the trophies.

== Player statistics ==
=== Most appearances ===
100+

#	Name	Matches	Position	Years	Nationality
1	Hrvoje Horvat	231	CB		CRO
2	Momir Rnić	217	P		SRB
3	Goran Perkovac	192	OB		CRO
4	Mile Isaković	190	W		SRB
5	Veselin Vujović	183	OB		MNE
6	Branislav Pokrajac	180	W		SRB
7	Zlatan Arnautović	157	GK		BIH
8	Slobodan Kuzmanovski	150	OB		MKD
9	Pavle Jurina	140	OB		CRO
10	Zdravko Rađenović	137	CB		SRB
11	Mirko Bašić	133+	GK		CRO
12	Abas Arslanagić	125	GK		BIH
13	Zdravko Zovko	119	W		CRO
14	Milan Kalina	100+	CB		SRB
15	Tonči Peribonio	100+	GK		CRO
16	Zlatko Saračević	100+	OB		BIH
17	Zlatko Portner	98+	CB		SRB

=== Top scorers ===
300+

#	Name	Goals	Average	Position	Years	Nationality
1	Veselin Vujović	738	4.03	OB		MNE
2	Mile Isaković	734	3.86	W		SRB
3	Hrvoje Horvat	621	2.69	CB		CRO
4	Branislav Pokrajac	510	2.83	W		SRB
5	Nedeljko Jovanović	433	2.81	CB		SRB
6	Momir Rnić	411	1.89	P		SRB
7	Slobodan Kuzmanovski	400	2.67	OB		MKD
8	Zdravko Rađenović	369	2.69	CB		SRB
9	Zlatko Portner	355	3.62	CB		SRB

== Coaches ==
Period	Republic Nationality	Coach
1951–1967	Croatia	Ivan Snoj
1967	Croatia	Irislav Dolenec
1967–1972	Croatia	Vlado Stenzel
1974	Croatia	Josip Milković
1975–1976	Croatia	Ivan Snoj
1978	Croatia	Zdravko Matulić
1979	Croatia	Zlatko Žagmešter
1978–1980	Serbia	Jezdimir Stanković
1980–1984	Serbia	Branislav Pokrajac
1984–1986	Serbia	Zoran Živković
1986–1988	Bosnia and Herzegovina	Abas Arslanagić
1989–1991	Serbia	Jezdimir Stanković

== Succeeding national teams ==
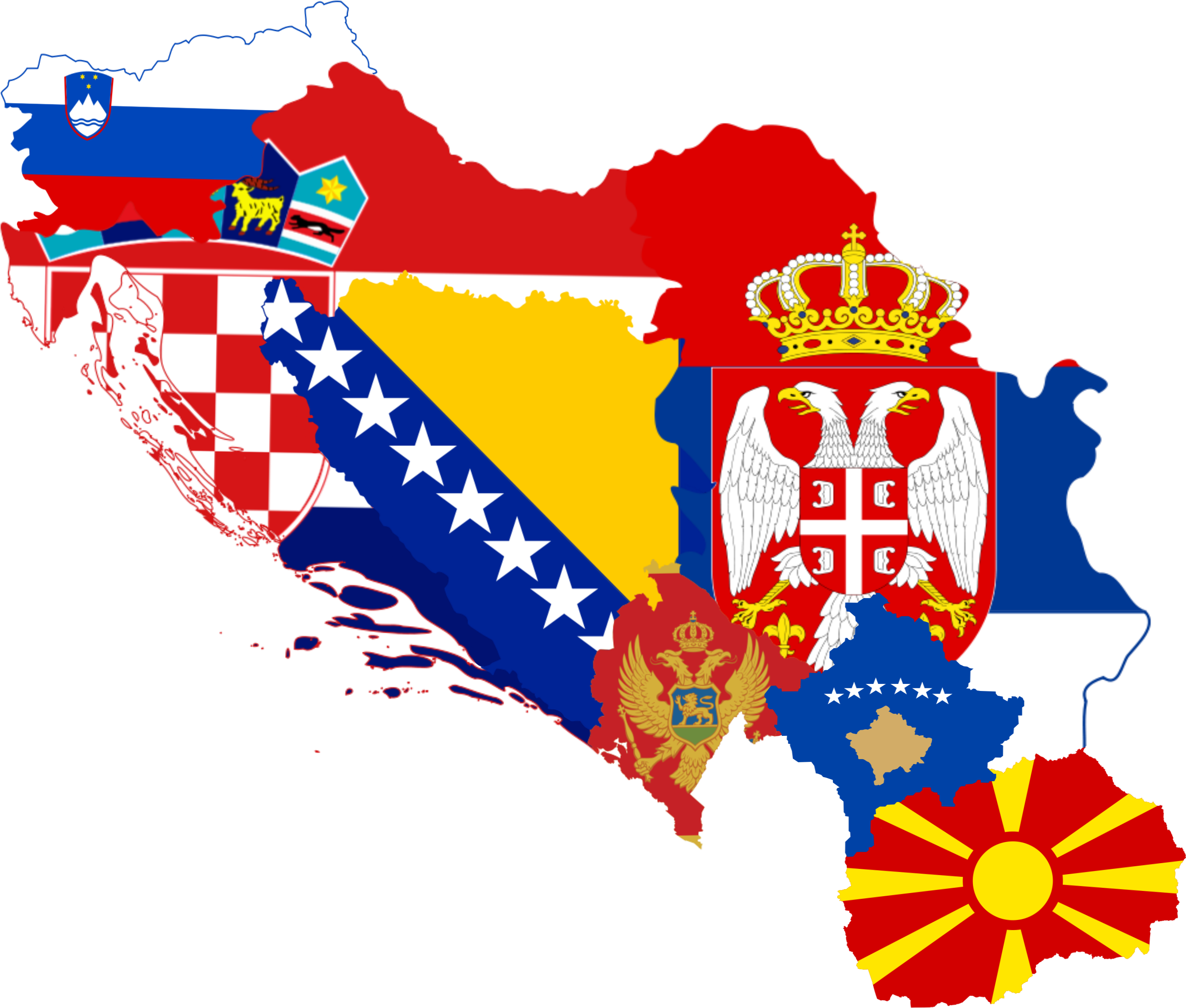

Team	Federation
Bosnia and Herzegovina	Handball Federation of Bosnia and Herzegovina
Croatia	Croatian Handball Federation
Kosovo	Handball Federation of Kosovo
North Macedonia	Macedonian Handball Federation
Montenegro	Handball Federation of Montenegro
Serbia	Handball Federation of Serbia
Slovenia	Handball Federation of Slovenia
FR Yugoslavia; Serbia and Montenegro	Defunct
