= 1985–86 European Cup (handball) =

26th edition of Europe's premier club handball tournament

European Cup
- 1985–86

Tournament information
- Sport: Handball
- Defending champions: RK Metaloplastika

Final positions
- Champions: RK Metaloplastika
- Runner-up: Wybrzeże Gdańsk

The 1985–86 European Cup was the 26th edition of Europe's premier club handball tournament. RK Metaloplastika won the tournament for a second time in a row.

== Knockout stage ==
=== Round 1 ===
Team 1	Agg.	Team 2	1st leg	2nd leg
Hapoel Rishon LeZion (Israel)	46–47	(Socialist Federal Republic of Yugoslavia) Borac Banja Luka	23–22	23–25
HB Liverpool (United Kingdom)	26–78	(East Germany) SC Magdeburg	15–39	11–39
IF Urædd (Norway)	49–38	(Faroe Islands) VIF Vestmanna	19–18	30–20
VfL Gummersbach (Germany)	48–23	(Luxembourg) HB Dudelange	23–13	25–10
Redbergslids IK (Sweden)	63–51	(Finland) BK46 Karis	31–21	32–30
Ionikos Athens (Greece)	31–77	(Hungary) Bányász Tatabánya	20–41	11–36
USM Gagny (France)	43–44	(Austria) ATSE Graz	22–22	21–22
Yenişehir Horta Ankara (Turkey)	39–53	(Bulgaria) Sportist Kremikovtzi	23–23	16–30
Initia Hasselt (Belgium)	27–42	(Denmark) Helsingør IF	15–21	12–21
Cividin Trieste (Italy)	33–35	(Switzerland) BSV Bern	19–14	14–21
Wybrzeże Gdańsk (Poland)	60–48	(Netherlands) TV Aalsmeer	27–25	33–23

=== Round 2 ===
Team 1	Agg.	Team 2	1st leg	2nd leg
RK Metaloplastika (Socialist Federal Republic of Yugoslavia)	48–44	(Socialist Federal Republic of Yugoslavia) Borac Banja Luka	26–18	22–26
IF Urædd (Norway)	55–59	(East Germany) SC Magdeburg	27–25	28–34
Steaua București (Romania)	39–39	(Germany) VfL Gummersbach	20–16	19–23
FH (Iceland)	36–56	(Sweden) Redbergslids IK	17–29	19–27
Bányász Tatabánya (Hungary)	47–53	(Czechoslovakia) Dukla Prague	24–24	23–29
Atlético Madrid (Spain)	43–24	(Austria) ATSE Graz	21–14	22–10
Sportist Kremikovtzi (Bulgaria)	38–46	(Denmark) Helsingør IF	24–20	14–26
Wybrzeże Gdańsk (Poland)	47–46	(Switzerland) BSV Bern	26–20	21–26

=== Quarterfinals ===
Team 1	Agg.	Team 2	1st leg	2nd leg
SC Magdeburg (East Germany)	49–63	(Socialist Federal Republic of Yugoslavia) RK Metaloplastika	23–25	26–38
Redbergslids IK (Sweden)	46–55	(Romania) Steaua București	22–23	24–32
Dukla Prague (Czechoslovakia)	31–31	(Spain) Atlético Madrid	18–15	13–16
Wybrzeże Gdańsk (Poland)	53–41	(Denmark) Helsingør IF	28–20	25–21

=== Semifinals ===
Team 1	Agg.	Team 2	1st leg	2nd leg
Steaua București (Romania)	41–45	(Socialist Federal Republic of Yugoslavia) RK Metaloplastika	24–22	17–23
Atlético Madrid (Spain)	42–46	(Poland) Wybrzeże Gdańsk	21–21	21–25

=== Finals ===
Team 1	Agg.	Team 2	1st leg	2nd leg
Wybrzeże Gdańsk (Poland)	52–54	(Socialist Federal Republic of Yugoslavia) RK Metaloplastika	29–24	23–30
