= 1984–85 European Cup (handball) =

European men's club handball tournament

European Cup
- 1984–85

Tournament information
- Sport: Handball

Final positions
- Champions: RK Metaloplastika

The 1984–85 European Cup was the 25th edition of Europe's premier club handball tournament.

== Knockout stage ==
=== Round 1 ===
Team 1	Agg.	Team 2	1st leg	2nd leg
TJ Škoda Plzeň (Czechoslovakia)	28–27	(Belgium) Initia Hasselt	16–13	12–14
Steaua București (Romania)	66–41	(Greece) Ionikos Athens	36–25	30–16
SKA Minsk (Soviet Union)	77–50	(Finland) BK46 Karis	40–22	37–28
FH (Iceland)	73–47	(Norway) Kolbotn IL Oslo	34–16	39–31
Vlug en Lenig Geleen (Netherlands)	53–19	(United Kingdom) HB Liverpool	23–10	30–9
SMUC Marseille (France)	45–43	(Italy) Cierre Scafati	24–16	21–27
CSKA Sofia (Bulgaria)	55–38	(Turkey) Yenişehir Horta Ankara	30–20	25–18
HB Dudelange (Luxembourg)	22–38	(Switzerland) RTV 1879 Basel	13–16	9–22
ATSE Graz (Austria)	38–57	(East Germany) SC Magdeburg	19–28	19–29
Hapoel Rehovot (Israel)	24–38	(Spain) Atlético Madrid	12–17	12–21

=== Round 2 ===
Team 1	Agg.	Team 2	1st leg	2nd leg
RK Metaloplastika (Socialist Federal Republic of Yugoslavia)	64–44	(Czechoslovakia) TJ Škoda Plzeň	36–18	28–26
SKA Minsk (Soviet Union)	46–48	(Romania) Steaua București	24–26	22–22
Honvéd Budapest (Hungary)	51–53	(Iceland) FH	29–27	22–26
Vlug en Lenig Geleen (Netherlands)	45–43	(France) SMUC Marseille	24–20	21–23
Wybrzeże Gdańsk (Poland)	44–49	(Czechoslovakia) Dukla Prague	24–25	20–24
CSKA Sofia (Bulgaria)	31–38	(Germany) TV Großwallstadt	17–12	14–26
RTV 1879 Basel (Switzerland)	38–45	(Denmark) Gladsaxe HG	18–25	20–20
Atlético Madrid (Spain)	43–41	(East Germany) SC Magdeburg	28–16	15–25

=== Quarterfinals ===
Team 1	Agg.	Team 2	1st leg	2nd leg
RK Metaloplastika (Socialist Federal Republic of Yugoslavia)	44–37	(Romania) Steaua București	24–19	20–18
FH (Iceland)	48–40	(Netherlands) Vlug en Lenig Geleen	24–16	24–24
TV Großwallstadt (Germany)	38–45	(Czechoslovakia) Dukla Prague	23–21	15–24
Gladsaxe HG (Denmark)	23–48	(Spain) Atlético Madrid	11–27	12–21

=== Semifinals ===
Team 1	Agg.	Team 2	1st leg	2nd leg
RK Metaloplastika (Socialist Federal Republic of Yugoslavia)	62–38	(Iceland) FH	32–17	30–21
Atlético Madrid (Spain)	33–32	(Czechoslovakia) Dukla Prague	16–14	17–18

=== Finals ===
Team 1	Agg.	Team 2	1st leg	2nd leg
RK Metaloplastika (Socialist Federal Republic of Yugoslavia)	49–32	(Spain) Atlético Madrid	19–12	30–20
