= Ivano Balić =

Croatian handball player (born 1979)

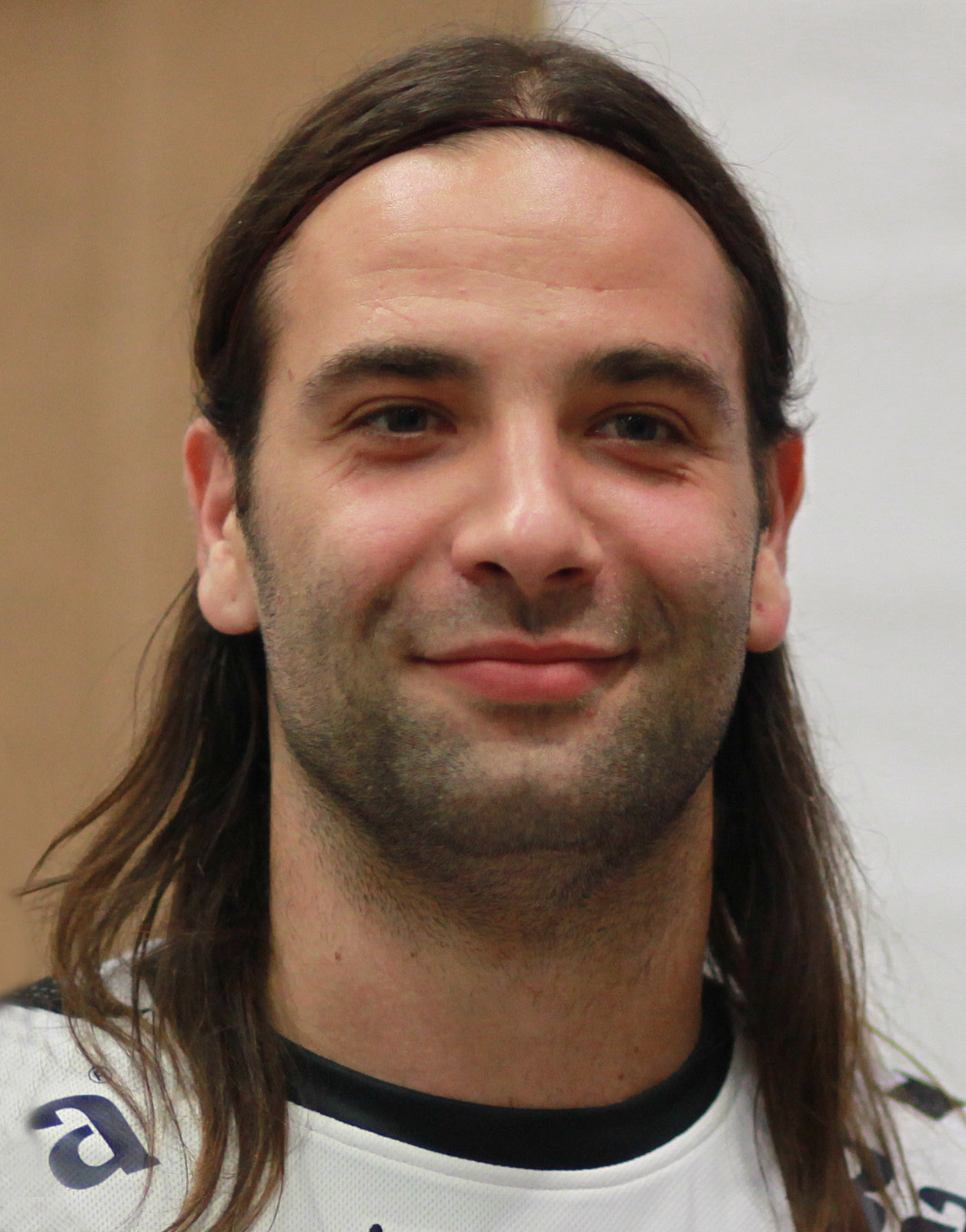
- Balić in 2009

Personal information
- Born: 1 April 1979 (age 47) Split, SR Croatia, Yugoslavia
- Height: 1.89 m (6 ft 2 1/2 in)

Sport
- Sport: Handball
- Position: Centre back
- Current club: RK Split (coaching staff)

Senior clubs
- Years: Team
- 1997–2001: RK Brodomerkur Split
- 2001–2004: RK Metković Jambo
- 2004–2008: Portland San Antonio
- 2008–2012: RK CO Zagreb
- 2012–2013: Atlético Madrid
- 2013–2015: HSG Wetzlar
National team
Years	Team		
1998–1999	Croatia U-20		
1998–1999	Croatia U-21		
2001–2012	Croatia	198	(535)

Teams managed
- 2021–2023: Croatia (assistant)
Medal record
Men's handball
Representing Croatia
Olympic Games
Gold medal – first place	2004 Athens	Team
Bronze medal – third place	2012 London	Team
World Championship
Gold medal – first place	2003 Portugal	Team
Silver medal – second place	2005 Tunisia	Team
Silver medal – second place	2009 Croatia	Team
European Championship
Silver medal – second place	2008 Norway	Team
Silver medal – second place	2010 Austria	Team
Bronze medal – third place	2012 Serbia	Team
Mediterranean Games
Gold medal – first place	2001 Tunis	Team

Ivano Balić (pronounced [ǐʋano bǎːlitɕ, - bǎ-]; born 1 April 1979) is a Croatian former professional handballer who is currently part of the coaching staff at RK Split. Renowned for his speed, creativity, movement and charisma as a player, Balić won the 2003 World Championship and the Olympic gold medal in 2004 with the Croatian national team, and thirteen titles playing for clubs in Croatia, Spain and Germany. He is widely considered one of the greatest Handball players of all time and has been nicknamed "Rukometni Mozart" ("Handball Mozart").

Balić was voted the most valuable player in five consecutive major international competitions and is one of only five male handball players to receive the IHF World Player of the Year award on more than one occasion (2003, 2006). In 2010, he was voted the best handball player in history in an online poll organized by the International Handball Federation (IHF). Balić was inducted into the European Handball Hall of Fame in 2023.

== Early life ==
Born in Split, Ivano was the only child of handball players, mother Stjepanka and father Žarko Balić. After the first three months of his birth, Balić moved with his parents to Italy because of his father's professional career. During his time in Italy, Balić lived in Rovereto and Prato. Aged seven, Balić and his mother returned to Split. When his father came back to play for RK Split in the Yugoslav Second League, Balić was always in attendance of the games.

Balić started playing basketball for KK Split due to him being a big fan of the club, which at the time was three time European champion. He played basketball until 1995 when his father's friend and then-coach of RK Split, Mate Bokan, suggested he play handball.

== Club career ==
Balić began his senior handball career with RK Brodomerkur Split in 1997, which competed in the top-tier Croatian First A League. In his first season with the club, Brodomerkur finished second in the league and got to the semi-finals of the EHF Cup where they lost to THW Kiel, the eventual winners of the cup. He played for Brodomerkur for three more seasons, reaching top positions in the league and the quarter-finals of the EHF Cup.

In 2001, Balić moved to RK Metković Jambo. In his first season with the team, he won the Croatian Cup and league championship. However, their league title was stripped away administratively and given to Badel 1862 Zagreb. This season was also Balić' first season playing the EHF Champions League. Balić spent the next few seasons perfecting his game, which was shown in 2003 when he became the first Croatian handballer to win the IHF World Player of the Year award and was voted Croatian Handballer of the Year in 2004.

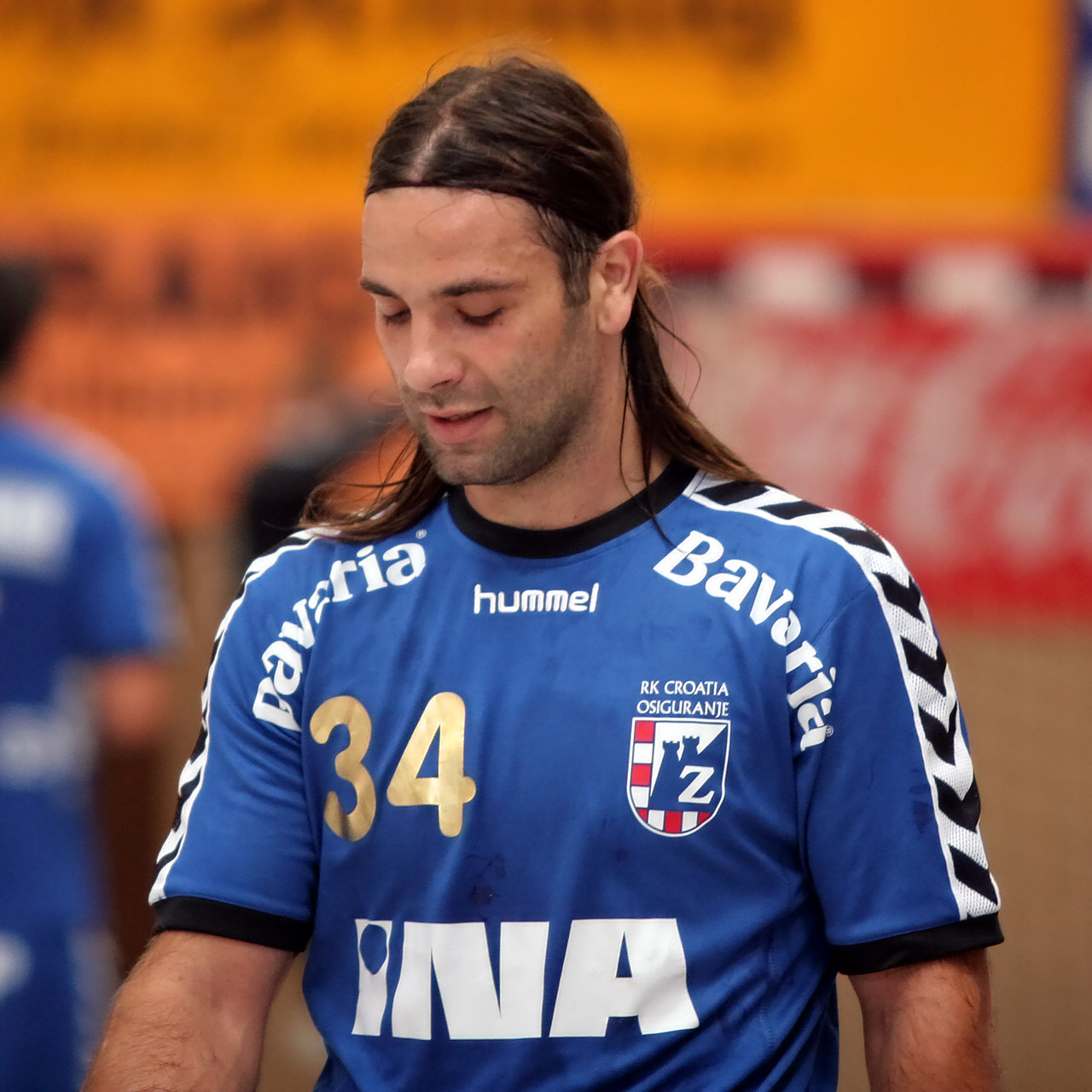
Balić playing for RK CO Zagreb at the Schlecker Cup in 2009.

Balić moved to Spanish team Portland San Antonio in 2004. He chose San Antonio in order to play with his idol Jackson Richardson. During his first season, he helped the club win the league championship and reached the quarter-final of the Champions League. The next season saw Balić in his first and only Champions League final, where San Antonio lost to a BM Ciudad Real in both final matches (losing 19–25 in the first leg and 28–37 in the second leg). Although he did not win the Champions League, he received his second IHF World Player of the Year award in 2006. In 2007, Balić was voted best Croatian athlete by Sportske novosti.

Between 2008 and 2012, Balić played for the Croatian team RK CO Zagreb, winning the Croatian Premier League and Croatian Cup four times.

In 2012, Balić returned to Spain to play for Atlético Madrid. He was forced to leave the club after one season as it went through bankruptcy, but won the IHF Super Globe and Copa del Rey with the team, in addition to finishing second in the league championship.

In 2013, Balić signed with German team HSG Wetzlar. Towards the end of the 2014–15 season, Balić announced his retirement from professional handball. On 5 June 2015, Balić played his last professional handball game in a 29–24 win against Göppingen, in which he scored one goal and made five assists.

== International career ==
In 1998, Balić started playing for Croatia under-20 and under-21 national teams at the same time. The following year, he was called up to play for the senior Croatia men's national team, but was sent home due to pneumonia. In December 2000, Balić was called up to train for the 2001 World Championship. In training, Balić sustained an injury trying to catch a reflected ball which caused Petar Metličić to fall on his foot and rupture his ligaments. The injury forced Balić to miss the World Championship in France.

Balić made his debut for the senior national team at the 2001 Mediterranean Games in Tunisia where Croatia won first place. The following year, Balić played at the 2002 European Championship in Sweden where Croatia finished in last place. Although they finished last in the tournament, they shocked the world a year later at the 2003 World Championship in Portugal where they won first place; after losing their opening match against Argentina (29–30), they beat Saudi Arabia, Russia, France, Hungary, Egypt, Denmark, Spain, and lastly Germany in the final.

Left-to-right: Balić, Renato Sulić, Denis Špoljarić, Nikša Kaleb, Slavko Goluža, Mirza Džomba, and Goran Šprem celebrating winning the 2003 World Championship in Portugal

In January 2004, Balić was included in Croatia's squad for the 2004 European Championship in Slovenia. The Croatian team had a good start in the group stage beating Spain and Denmark, and conceding a draw against Portugal. The team reached he semi-finals where they lost against hosts Slovenia and finished fourth after losing to Denmark in a third place game. Balić was voted the most valuable player (MVP) of the tournament and included in the all-star team as best play maker. In August of that same year, Balić was selected to play at the 2004 Summer Olympics where the national team won the gold medal. Croatia went through the tournament undefeated and Balić was voted MVP and best play maker at the tournament. For winning the gold medal, all players were awarded the Franjo Bučar State Award for Sport yearly award. Balić won the award with the team, as he also received another yearly award by himself.

At the 2005 World Championship in Tunisia, Croatia came in second place after losing to Spain in the final game. Balić was voted MVP and best play maker of the tournament. At the 2006 European Championship in Switzerland, Croatia placed fourth. Balić was once again voted MVP of the tournament and the best play maker, and was also the fourth-placed top goalscorer with 43 goals and top field goalscorer. The same year, Balić was also part of the team that won the Stratoil World Cup in Sweden and Germany. During this tournament, Balić invented the nickname of the Croatian national team: Kauboji (lit. 'The Cowboys').

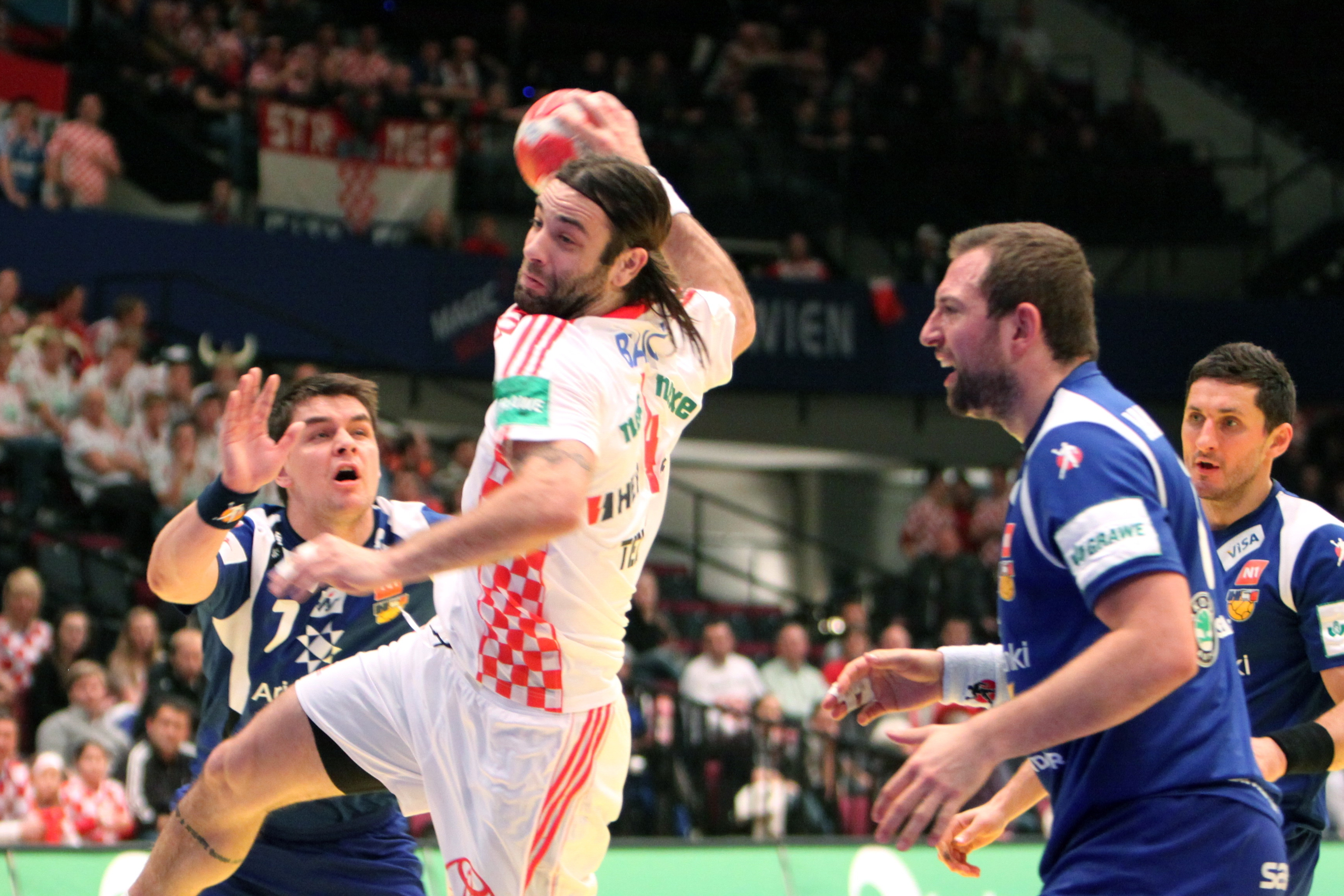
Balić playing at the 2010 European Championship

At the 2007 World Championship in Germany, Croatia came in fifth place, with Balić being voted MVP for a fifth consecutive major international tournament. Balić and the national team placed second at the 2008 European Championship in Norway after losing to Denmark in the final. The silver medal was the first European championship medal Balić had won. Balić was also voted best centre back and was joint top goalscorer alongside Nikola Karabatić and Lars Christiansen with 44 goals. That same year, Balić was selected to be Croatia's flag bearer at the 2008 Summer Olympics in Beijing. Croatia finished the tournament in fourth place after losing the third place match against Spain.

At the 2009 World Championship in Croatia, Balić and the national team went undefeated through the group and knockout stages, but lost in the final against France where a rivalry between Balić and Nikola Karabatić emerged, named by the media as the "clash of the titans". At the 2010 European Championship in Austria, Croatia won another silver medal after losing to France in the final game.

Following an unsuccessful 2011 World Championship where Croatia came in fifth place, Balić won bronze medals with Croatia in 2012 at the European Championship in Serbia and at the Olympics in London. Prior to the 2013 World Championship in Spain, Balić was dropped from the squad by then-head coach Slavko Goluža and subsequently retired from the national team.

== Post-playing career ==
Following his retirement from playing professional handball, Balić joined the Croatia men's national handball team coaching staff under newly appointed head coach Željko Babić as the team's coordinator, alongside his old colleagues Petar Metličić as assistant and Valter Matošević as goalkeeper coach. As part of the staff, he won the bronze medal at the 2016 European Championship in Poland with the national the team, and was also part of the fifth-place placement at the 2016 Summer Olympics in Rio de Janeiro.

On 8 April 2021, the Croatian Handball Federation appointed Balić as assistant coach to Hrvoje Horvat in the coaching staff of the senior Croatian national handball team. Balić left the national team coaching staff in 2023. On 12 January 2024, Balić joined the coaching staff at RK Split.

== Personal life ==
From 1999 to 2006, Balić was married to his wife Ivana. They have one son together, Dino, born 2000. In 2014, Balić and his girlfriend Mirela Delić welcomed their first child together, a son named Vigo. In 2016, Balić and Delić became parents to their first daughter, Nola.

One of Balić' favorite sports is basketball.

== Honours ==
=== Club ===
Split

- Croatian First A League
  - Runner-up (1): 1997–98

Metković

- Croatian First League
  - Runner-up (3): 2001–02, 2002–03, 2003–04
- Croatian Cup
  - Winner (1): 2002
  - Finalist (1): 2004

San Antonio

- Liga ASOBAL
  - Winner (1): 2004–05
- Supercopa ASOBAL
  - Winner (1): 2004
- EHF Champions League
  - Finalist (1): 2005–06

Zagreb

- Dukat Premier League
  - Winner (4): 2008–09, 2009–10, 2010–11, 2011–12
- Croatian Cup
  - Winner (4): 2009, 2010, 2011, 2012

Atletico Madrid

- Liga ASOBAL
  - Runner-up (1): 2012–13
- Copa del Rey
  - Winner (1): 2013
- IHF Super Globe
  - Winner (1): 2012

=== Individual ===
General

- IHF World Player of the Year: 2003, 2006
- Franjo Bučar State Award for Sport: 2004 (two awards)
- Best Croatian handballer: 2004, 2006, 2007, 2008
- Croatian Sportsman of the Year: 2007
- Star on Croatian walk of fame in Opatija: 2007
- Best Male Handball Player Ever – fans poll: 2010
- Trophy COC for inspiring youth: 2010
- 2007 most successful athlete by: Croatian Olympic Committee
- 5th top goalscorer of the Croatia men's national handball team
- European Handball Federation Hall of Fame in 2023.

All-Star Team

- Most valuable player (MVP) and best centre back of the 2004 European Championship
- MVP and best centre back of the 2004 Summer Olympics
- MVP and best centre back of the 2005 World Championship
- MVP and best centre back of the 2006 European Championship
- Top field goalscorer of the 2006 European Championship – 43 goals
- MVP of the 2007 World Championship
- Best centre back and top goalscorer of the 2008 European Championship – 44 goals
- Best centre back of Liga ASOBAL: 2004–05, 2005–06, 2006–07

Distinctions

- Best sportsperson of Dalmatia by Slobodna Dalmacija: 2003
- The award of Metković "Crane" for great achievements in handball and for promoting the reputation of Metković in the country and the world: 2004

=== Orders ===
- Order of Danica Hrvatska with face of Franjo Bučar

== See also ==
- 2008 Summer Olympics national flag bearers

Awards
Preceded by (France) Bertrand Gille	IHF World Player of the Year; 2003	Succeeded by (Germany) Henning Fritz
Preceded by (Serbia and Montenegro) Árpád Sterbik	IHF World Player of the Year; 2006	Succeeded by (France) Nikola Karabatić
Olympic Games
Preceded by Dubravko Šimenc	Flagbearer for Croatia; Beijing 2008	Succeeded by Venio Losert
