= Renato Sulić =

Croatian handball player (born 1979)

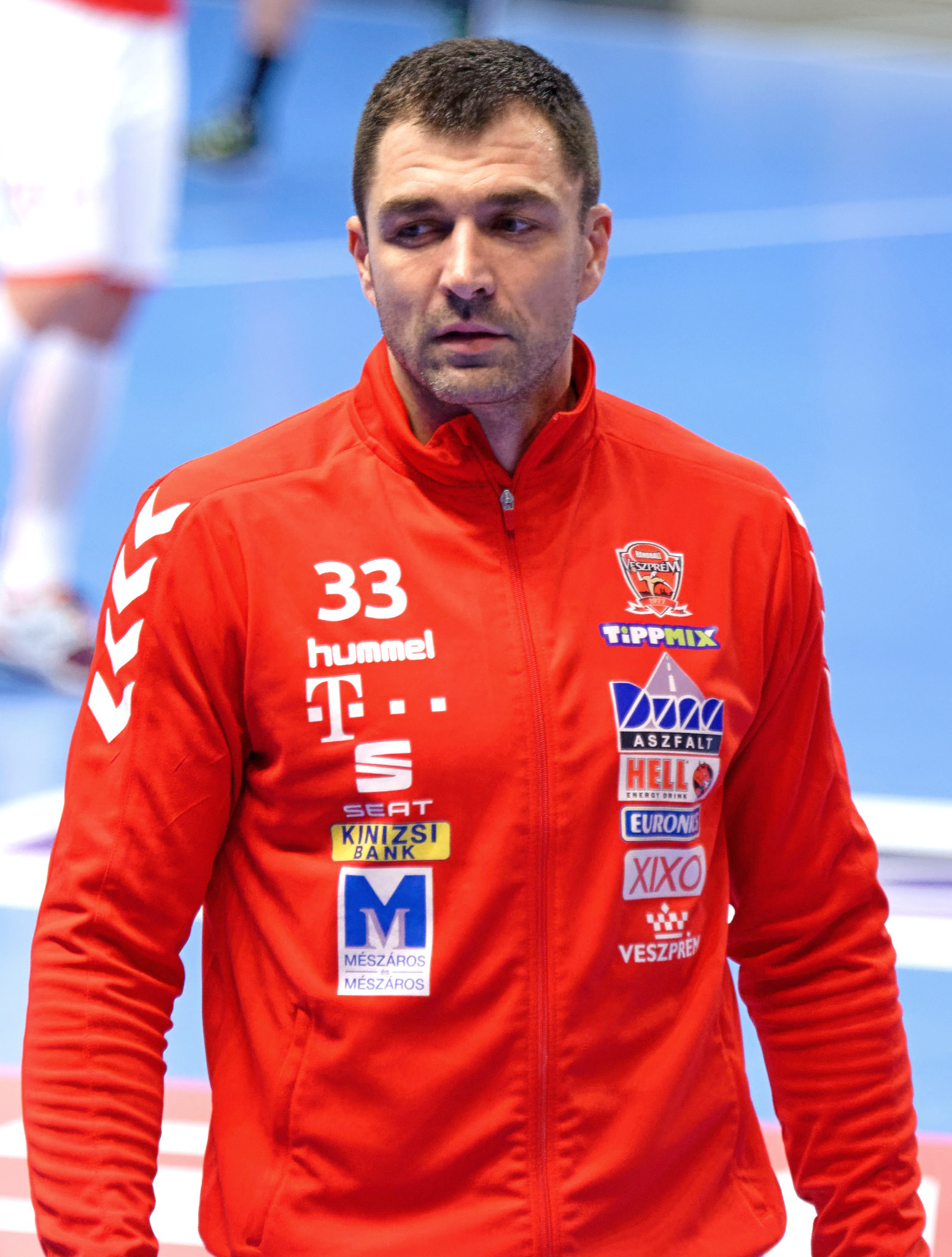
- Sulić in 2017 with Veszprém.

Personal information
- Nationality: Croatian
- Born: 12 October 1979 (age 47) Rijeka, SFR Yugoslavia
- Height: 1.92 m (6 ft 4 in)

Sport
- Sport: Handball
- Position: Pivot
- Current club: Wisła Płock
- Number: 39

Youth career
- Years: Team
- –: RK Trsat
- 1995–1996: RK Zamet

Senior clubs
- Years: Team
- 1995–1998: RK Zamet
- 1995–1996: → RK Pećine (loan)
- 1998–1999: Metković Jambo
- 1999–2001: Zamet Crotek
- 2001–2004: RK Zagreb
- 2004–2005: Fotex Veszprém
- 2005–2006: Agram Medveščak
- 2006–2009: RK Celje
- 2009–2018: Telekom Veszprém
- 2018–2020: Wisła Płock
- 2020–: RK Zamet
National team
Years	Team	Apps	(Gls)
2001–2008	Croatia	100	(221)
Medal record
Men's handball
Representing Croatia
World Championship
Gold medal – first place	2003 Portugal	Team competition
European Championship
Silver medal – second place	2008 Norway	Team competition
Mediterranean Games
Gold medal – first place	2001 Tunis	Team competition

Renato Sulić (born 12 November 1979 in Rijeka) is a Croatian handball player who currently plays for RK Zamet.

== Club career ==
Sulić started his youth career in RK Trsat where very quickly he showed a great capability in playing handball. Soon he moved to RK Zamet where he helped the team return to the First A League in 1995–96 season. The same year he was also a part of the winning Zamet team in the U-19 Championship.

After four years in Zamet he became unhappy with his status in the club and left to Metković Jambo. He stayed in the club for only a year and won his first European competition EHF Cup and finishing second in the league.

Sulić returned for a season to RK Zamet before going to play for RK Zagreb. During his time in Zagreb he won 3 league titles and 2 cup titles. After Zagreb he had short stints in Fotex Veszprém, Agram Medvečak before spending three years in Pivovarna Laško Celje.

In 2009 Sulić returned to Veszprém where he has won every domestic cup and league season since 2009 and the SEHA League since 2014.

== International career ==
Ivano Balić, Renato Sulić, Denis Špoljarić, Nikša Kaleb, Slavko Goluža, Mirza Džomba and Goran Šprem celebrating winning the 2003 World Championship

Renato made his first appearance for Croatia at the 2001 World Championship. The same year he won his first medal at the 2001 Mediterranean Games where Croatia won first place.

In 2003 Renato played a pivotal role in Croatia winning the 2003 World Championship.

After the 2004 European Championship where Croatia secured 4th place Sulić got hit in a car accident. He had an operation on his left knee and missed out on the 2004 Summer Olympics.

In 2006 he played at the World Cup in Sweden where Croatia won first place. In 2008 he won a silver medal with Croatia at 2008 European Championship in Norway. The same year he represented his country at the 2008 Summer Olympics in Beijing, China. Croatia lost in the semi-finals and finished at fourth place.

After not being selected for 7 years Željko Babić called up Sulić to play for the national team but Sulić refused and said his national team days are a finished story.

== Personal life ==
Sulić has been married to former Miss Universe contestant Maja Cecić-Vidoš since 2003. Renato and Maja have four children, three daughters and a son.

For a while Sulić and his wife owned a local bar in Rijeka named Maat Bar.

In 2016 Sulić obtained Hungarian citizenship.

== Honours ==
=== Club ===
Zamet

- Croatian First B League (1): 1995–96
- Croatian Championship U-19 (1): 1996

Zagreb

- Croatian First League (3): 2001-02, 2002–03, 2003–04
- Croatian Cup (2): 2003, 2004

Pivovarna Laško Celje

- Slovenian First League (2): 2006–07, 2007–08
- Slovenian Cup (1): 2007

Veszprém

- Hungarian First League (9): 2004–05, 2009–10, 2010–11, 2011–12, 2012–13, 2013–14, 2014–15, 2015-16, 2016-17
- Hungarian Cup (10): 2005, 2010, 2011, 2012, 2013, 2014, 2015, 2016, 2017, 2018
- SEHA League (2): 2014-15, 2015–16
- EHF Champions League final (2): 2014-15, 2015–16

Croatia

- 2001 Mediterranean Games in Tunis - 1st
- 2002 European Championship in Sweden - 16th
- 2003 World Championship in Portugal - 1st
- 2004 European Championship in Slovenia - 4th
- 2006 European Championship in Switzerland - 4th
- 2006 World Cup in Sweden - 1st
- 2007 World Championship in Germany - 5th
- 2008 European Championship in Norway - 2nd
- 2008 Summer Olympics in Beijing - 4th

Individual

- 2003 Athletes of the Year by Croatian Olympic Committee
- 2006 Athletes of the Year by Croatian Olympic Committee
- 2013-14 EHF Champions League top 8
- 2013-14 EHF Champions League best line player
- 2014-15 EHF Champions League all-star team
- RK Zamet hall of fame - 2015
