= Jakov Gojun =

Croatian handball player (born 1986)

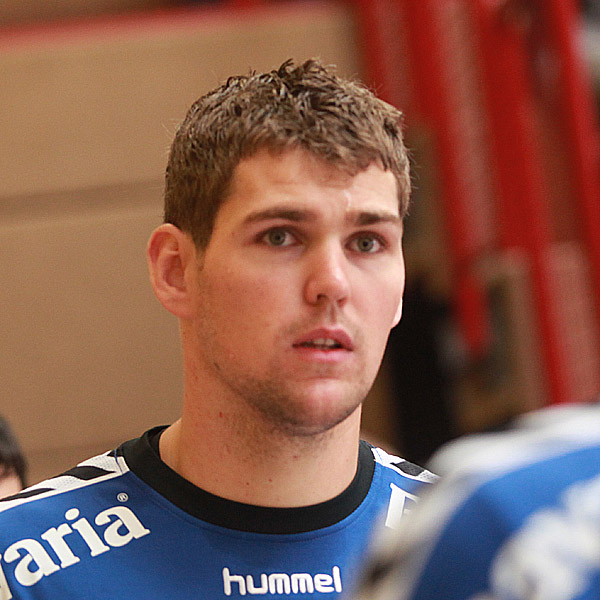

Personal information
- Nationality: Croatian
- Born: 18 April 1986 (age 40) Split, Croatia
- Height: 2.04 m (6 ft 8 in)

Sport
- Sport: Handball
- Position: Left back
- Current club: RK Zagreb
- Number: 10

Youth career
- Years: Team
- HRK Krilnik: RK Split

Senior clubs
- Years: Team
- 2002–2003: HRK Krilnik
- 2003–2004: RK Solin
- 2004–2008: RK Zamet
- 2008–2009: RK Siscia
- 2009–2012: CO Zagreb
- 2012–2013: Atlético de Madrid
- 2013–2015: Paris Saint-Germain
- 2015–2021: Füchse Berlin
- 2021–: RK Zagreb
National team
Years	Team	Apps	(Gls)
2007–	Croatia	168	(80)
Medal record
Olympic Games
Bronze medal – third place	2012 London	Team
World Championships
Silver medal – second place	2009 Croatia
Bronze medal – third place	2013 Spain
European Championships
Silver medal – second place	2010 Austria
Bronze medal – third place	2012 Serbia
Bronze medal – third place	2016 Poland

Jakov Gojun (born 18 April 1986) is a Croatian handball player who plays for RK Zagreb and Croatian national team.

He competed for the Croatia national team at the 2012 Summer Olympics in London, winning the bronze medal. Due to his defensive playing style he has been nicknamed the Minister of defense by fans of the national team.

== Early life ==
Gojun was born 18 April 1986 in Split, Croatia. At a young age he started playing handball in his hometown club of HRK Krilnik.

== Career ==
=== RK Krilnik & RK Solin ===
Unable to prove himself to play for the senior squad of RK Split he started his senior career in RK Krilnik, which is also from Split.

He played for Krilnik for one season in the Second League - South 2002–03 season helping his club finish in third place but failing to earn promotion to the First League. The next season, he transferred to Solin Transportcommerce. He played in the same league with Solin finishing in ninth place.

=== RK Zamet ===
In July 2004 Gojun transferred to RK Zamet from Rijeka.

During the beginning of the season under head coach Franko Mileta Zamet finished their first half of the season in seventh place failing to qualify for the championship play-off due to goal difference with PIPO IPC Čakovec. On 9 November Gojun showed great playing skill in defense against RK Zagreb in a defeat of 27:24. On 25 December Franko Mileta was sacked and Williams Černeka took over the team for the rest of the season. RK Zamet. RK Zamet was ranked 14 in the league and was knocked out of the Cup in the round of 16. He also played for the second team Zamet II under coach Damir Čavlović they won the Third League - West and got promoted to the Second League. Gojun's performances that season where rewarded with a call up for the Croatia U-18 squad.

In June 2005 Boris Dragičević was announced as the new head coach. Gojun and his team began a strong campaign finishing third in the first half of the season granting them the championship play-offs. Their second part of the season finished badly, finishing last in the play-offs. During the play-offs Gojun's teammate Mladen Prskalo became head coach.

At the start of the next season Zamet had sort of a rocky start winning only 4 matches out of 13 in their group. In February 2007 Prskalo was sacked and Drago Žiljak became head coach. During this season Gojun played a big role in defensive role as well as an attacking role. The next season Zamet was placed 8 in the league and reached the quarter-final of the Cup where they lost to RK Nexe Našice.

=== RK Siscia ===
In June 2008 Gojun moved to RK Siscia from Sisak where he was called up by head coach Slavko Goluža.

Siscia started out with a strong campaign. Gojun established himself as more of an attacking player from the start scoring averagely four or five goals per match. On 20 December 2008, in a match against RK Metković Gojun scored five goals for a win of 30:21. He scored seven goals in cup qualification match against Varteks di Caprio. Siscia won the match 23:28. On 12 March 2009 Gojun scored 8 goals against RK Moslavina Kutina with the result ending in 31:22 for Siscia.

At the end of the season Siscia finished fourth in the Premier League.

=== RK Croatia Osiguranje Zagreb ===
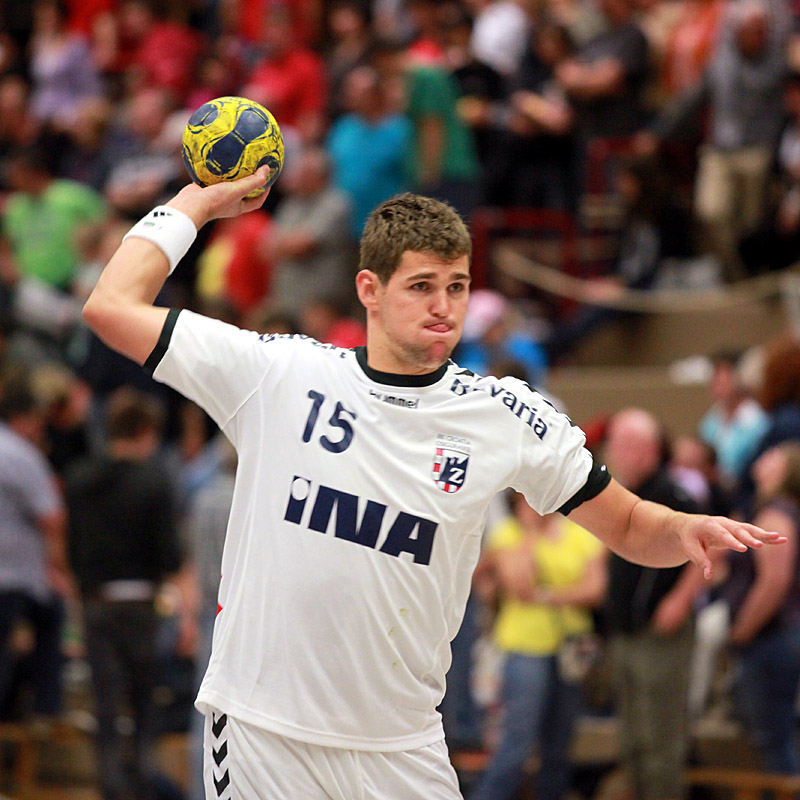
Gojun playing for CO Zagreb at Schlecker Cup in 2010

On 11 July 2009 it was announced that Gojun would be joining the Croatian power house RK Croatia Osiguranje Zagreb.

Gojun made his first appeared for the club at friendly tournament in August called Poreč handball cup. Zagreb finished first place defeating RK Metalurg Skopje, RK Cimos Koper and drawing with VfL Gummersbach.

Zagreb went routinely undefeated throughout the domestic league and cup. Gojun made his EHF Champions League debut on 3 October 2009 against Norwegian club Fyllingen Håndball in an away match where Zagreb won 22:29. Gojun provided defense replacing Domagoj Duvnjak with and Tonči Valčić. He also got penalized for 2 minutes. On 22 March 2010 Senjanin Maglajlija was sacked and Nenad Kljaić became the new head coach. Zagreb got the round of 16 and lost to Barcelona. He scored 15 goals in 12 appearances.

At the start of the 2010–11 season Zagreb started with their usual dominance in the domestic league. Ivica Obrvan became the new head coach midway through the season. In the round of they lost to Rhein-Neckar Löwen 55:58 on aggregate. In 2012 Zagreb reached the quarter-final of the EHF Champions League and lost to THW Kiel.

During his time in RK Croatia Osiguranje Zagreb Gojun won three league titles and three cup titles.

=== Atlético de Madrid ===
In April 2012 Gojun announced he would be moving to Atlético de Madrid during the summer.

At Atlético he played under coach Talant Duyshebaev. Gojun's first appearance for the club was on the 27 of August 2012 at the IHF Super Globe where Atlético won their first match 28:23 against El Jaish. In the final they won against THW Kiel 28:23. On September 8 Atlético played Supercopa ASOBAL against Barcelona and lost 31:34. Gojun scored two goals and provided defensive cover.

Atlético started a good domestic campaign with Gojun providing a big role in attack and defense. After two months at the club he stated that he felt like he was at home. On 21 October Atlético defeated CB Cangas 34:13, Gojun didn't score but he did provide a spectacular defensive wall. On 8 December Atlético lost to Barcelona in home match 22:25. In a Copa ASOBAL match against Naturhouse La Rioja Gojun scored three goals in a win for Atlético of 30:34. In the final they lost against Barcelona in a staggering defeat of 24:32.

In the EHF Champions League Atlético got to the quarter-finals where they face Barcelona yet again. They won the home match 25:20. But they lost the away match 32:24.

They finished second in the league nine points behind Barcelona. On 4 May Atlético won the final of the Copa del Rey 28:38 against Naturhouse La Rioja. But they lost the away match 32:24.

At the beginning of July it was announced that Atlético de Madrid was going into financial bankruptcy.

=== Paris Saint-Germain ===
On 11 July Gojun signed with French club Paris Saint-Germain Handball.

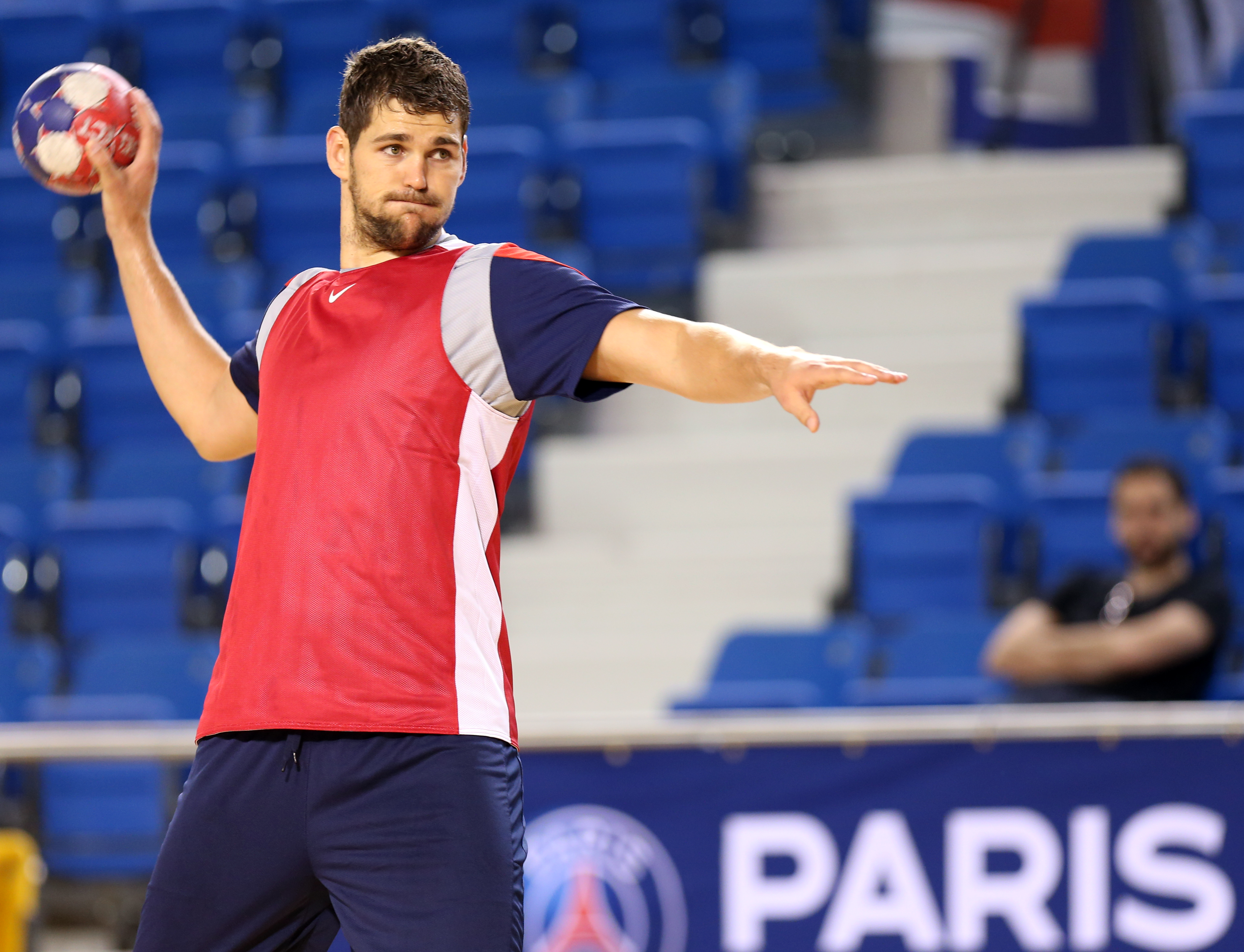
Gojun training in 2013

On 6 October PSG won the derby against Montpellier 30:29. Gojun scored his first goal for the club three days later against US Ivry. On December 5 PSG lost their first match in the league against US Dunkerque 25:21. A week later they lost to HBC Nantes.

On 9 February 2014 PSG defeated RK Metalurg Skopje 32:29, Gojun scored three goals to Červar's Metalurg. In a surprise victory RK Gorenje Velenje defeated PSG 30:28 in the EHF Champions League. PSG was knocked out in the quarter-finals by Veszprém. PSG finished second in the league and won the Coupe de France.

On 13 June Gojun played for the World selection team headed by Slavko Goluža and played with players such as José Javier Hombrados, Torsten Jansen, Valentin Porte, Alex Dujshebaev, Domagoj Duvnjak and many more. They won against Egypt 31:33 in the humanitarian match.

In September PSG secured the Trophée des champions yet again, Gojun even scored one goal in the match. On 5 October PSG played a Champions League match against Gojun's former club Zagreb and won 27:22 but Gojun couldn't play due to a shoulder injury. In November PSG got knocked out of the Coupe de la Ligue in the quarter-finals by Nantes.

PSG once again reached the quarter-finals of the EHF Champions League but lost to Veszprém just like the previous year. During the month of May PSG took the league by storm with against Montpellier, Dunkerque HGL, Saint-Raphaël Var witch bounced them to first place one point above Montpellier. PSG won the LNH Division 1.

Gojun had already announced his departure from the club on 22 April 2015.

Füchse Berlin Reinickendorf HBC

Uppon my arrival his arrival to Gojun won the 2015 IHF Super Globe with the club defeating Veszprém in the final 28:27 to witch Gojun scored two goals.

== International career ==
After playing for various youth squads he was invited to the senior national team in November 2007 by head coach Lino Červar to participate in their preparation in Poreč.

Gojun was hailed to be the successor of Davor Dominiković. On 19 January 2009 Lino Červar announced that Gojun would be playing at the 2009 World Championship in Croatia. He played in every match and was one of the best players on the team. Croatia got to the final where they lost to France 21:19 in a dramatic final.

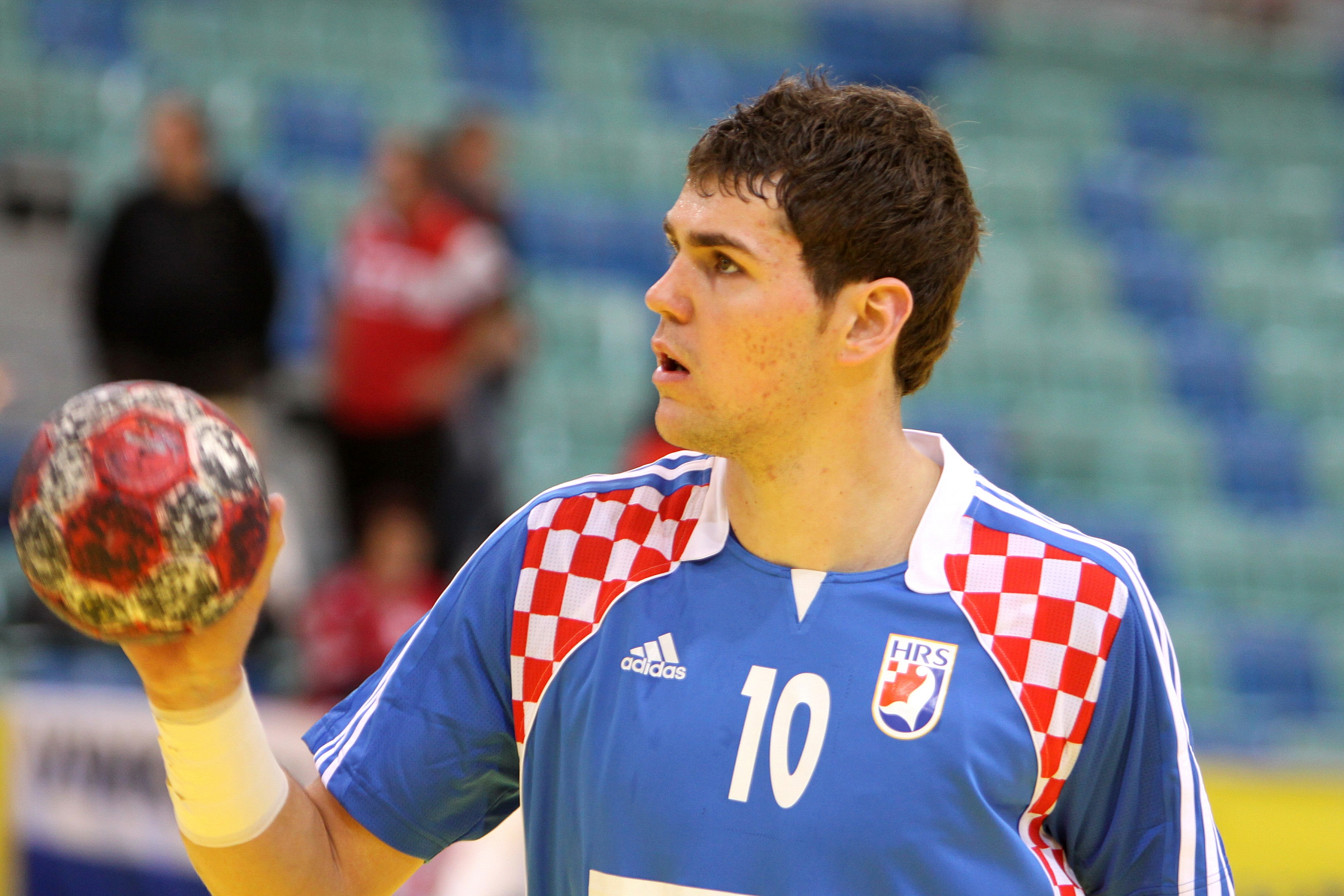
Gojun in 2010

Since then Gojun has been a regular Croatian national team player appearing in every major tournament since. In 2010 at the European Championship Gojun was voted the best defensive player of the tournament. At the tournament Croatia reached the final and lost to France.

On 14 September 2010 Slavko Goluža was appointed as the new head coach of Croatia. At the 2011 World Championship Croatia passed the group stage and were knocked out during the main round by Sweden. They won the fifth place match against Iceland. At the 2012 European Championship in Serbia, Croatia reached the semi-finals and lost to Serbia. They won the third place match against Spain. Gojun competed at the 2012 Summer Olympics in London and won a bronze medal with Croatia. They defeated Hungary in the third place match. At the 2013 World Championship lost to Denmark in the semi-finals. They won the bronze medal defeating Slovenia 26:31.

Next year at the 2014 European Championship went undefeated to the semi-finals where they lost to the hosts Denmark 29:27. They even lost the third place match to Spain 28:29. At the 2015 World Championship in Qatar was sixth. After the tournament Slavko Goluža resigned at head coach.

Željko Babić was appointed as the new head coach. At the 2016 European Championship in Poland won a bronze medal. In the summer of 2016 they played at the 2016 Summer Olympics in Rio de Janeiro. After passing the group stage they lost to Poland in the quarter-finals 27:30. They were ranked fifth.

After the 2018 European Championship Gojun retired from the Croatian national team having made 168 appearances and scoring 80 goals, Gojun stated that he would play for the national team again only if necessary and said that there are more that enough young and skilled players in the team.

== Personal life ==
On 20 December 2014 Gojun married Kristina Šitum in Split. Gojun has a son who was born in 2015. Gojun has stated that he feels Rijeka is his second home, that he feels like he had a second childhood there. He is still good friend with most of his former teammates such as Mateo Hrvatin and Milan Uzelac.

== Honours ==
Club
Zamet II

- Third League (West): 2004–05

Croatia Osiguranje Zagreb

- Dukat Premier League: 2009–10, 2010–11, 2011–12
- Croatian Cup: 2010, 2011, 2012

Atlético de Madrid

- IHF Super Globe: 2012
- Copa del Rey: 2013

Paris Saint Germain Handball

- LNH Division 1: 2014-15
- Coupe de France: 2014, 2015
- Trophée des Champions: 2014, 2015

Füchse Berlin Reinickendorf HBC

- IHF Super Globe: 2015, 2016
- EHF Cup: 2017-18

RK Zagreb

- Croatian Premier League: 2022, 2023
- Croatian Cup: 2022

Croatia

- World Championship 2009 Croatia - 2nd place
- European Championship 2010 Austria - 2nd place
- European Championship 2012 Serbia - 3rd place
- Olympic Games 2012 London - 3rd place
- World Championship 2013 Spain - 3rd place
- European Championship 2016 Poland - 3rd place

Individual

- Sportske novosti team of the year: 2009
- Best sports teams by COC: 2009
- Best defensive player at European Championship 2010
- Best defensive player at European Championship 2018

== Orders ==
- Order of the Croatian Interlace - 2009
