= Nino Marković =

Croatian handball player and coach (born 1962)

Personal information
- Nationality: Croatian
- Born: 9 December 1962 (age 63) Zagreb, SFR Yugoslavia

Sport
- Sport: Handball

Senior clubs
- Years: Team
- 1979-1989: Medveščak Zagreb
- 1989-1990: Zamet Rijeka
- 1990-1992: Zagreb Loto
- 1992-1993: Sisak
- 1993-1995: Varteks Tivar
- 1995-1997: Moslavina Kutina

Teams managed
- 1997-2001: Badel 1862 Zagreb (Youth academy)
- 2001-2003: Zagreb
- 2003-2005: Zagreb (Assistant coach)
- 2005-present: Zagreb (Youth academy)
- 2007-2009: Croatia U-19
Medal record
Representing Croatia
Youth World Championship
Gold medal – first place	2009 Tunisia	Coach

Nino Marković (born 9 December 1962) is a former Croatian handball player and current youth coordinator at RK Zagreb.

== Career ==
Marković was born in Zagreb. During his handball career, he played for Medveščak Zagreb, Zamet Rijeka, Zagreb Loto, Sisak, Varteks Tivar and Moslavina Kutina. With Medveščak he won four cup titles. In 1989 he moved to Zamet where he played for one season before joining Zagreb Chromos the following year named Zagreb Loto. In 1992 Marković won the league, cup and European Champions Cup title with the club.

He later played for RK Sisak, Varteks Tivar Varaždin and Moslavina Kutina. With moslavina he reached the 1996 Croatian Cup final where they were beaten by Croatia Banka Zagreb by two goals.

After retiring as a player he became a coach at RK Zagreb. During his coaching career he has mostly coached youth selections of RK Zagreb winning various domestic championships and tournaments. From 2001 to 2003 Marković was head coach of the senior team of RK Zagreb alongside Vlado Nekić. Later he was Lino Červars assistant coach at the team.

He was also a coach of Croatia U-19 with who won the IHF Men's Youth World Championship in Tunisia 2009.

== Honours ==
=== Player ===
Medveščak Zagreb

- Yugoslav Cup (4): 1981, 1986, 1987, 1989

Zagreb Loto

- Yugoslav First League (1): 1990-91
- Yugoslav Cup (1): 1991
- Croatian First A League (1): 1992
- Croatian Cup (1): 1992
- European Champions Cup (1): 1991-92

=== Coach ===
Zagreb

- Croatian First A League (2): 2001-02, 2002-03
- Croatian Cup (1): 2003

Croatia U-19

- IHF Men's Youth World Championship (1): 2009
