= Zdravko Zovko =

Croatian handball player (born 1955)

Personal information
- Nationality: Croatian
- Born: 25 May 1955 (age 71) Gornje Kolibe, PR Bosnia and Herzegovina, FPR Yugoslavia
- Height: 1.83 m (6 ft 0 in)

Sport
- Sport: Handball
- Current club: Siófok KC (manager)

Senior clubs
- Years: Team
- 1972–1986: Medveščak Zagreb
- 1986–1989: C.C. Ortigia Siracusa
National team
Years	Team	Apps
1974–1984	Yugoslavia	119

Teams managed
- 1990–1994: Zagreb Loto
- 1993–1995: Croatia (men)
- 1995–1998: Laško Pivovara Celje
- 1999–2000: Croatia (men)
- 1999–2000: Badel 1862 Zagreb
- 2000–2007: MKB Veszprém
- 2007–2010: Croatia (women)
- 2007–2010: Podravka Koprivnica
- 2011: TSV Lohr
- 2011–2013: Zvezda Zvenigorod
- 2013–2015: Croatia (men) (assistant coach)
- 2015–2017: Dunaferr SE
- 2017–2018: RK Zagreb (youth)
- 2018–2020: Győri ETO (assistant coach)
- 2020–2021: Siófok KC
- 2021: Siófok KC (assistant coach)
Medal record
Men's handball
Representing Yugoslavia
Olympic Games
Gold medal – first place	1984 Los Angeles	Team
World Championship
Bronze medal – third place	1974 East Germany	Team
Silver medal – second place	1982 West Germany	Team
Mediterranean Games
Gold medal – first place	1979 Split	Team
Gold medal – first place	1983 Casablanca	Team
Representing Croatia
European Championship
Bronze medal – third place	1994 Portugal	Coach
World Championship
Silver medal – second place	1995 Iceland	Coach
Mediterranean Games
Gold medal – first place	1993 Languedoc-Roussillonu	Coach

Zdravko Zovko (born 28 May 1955) is a retired Croatian handball player.

== Career ==
Zovko spent his entire playing career in RK Medveščak from Zagreb and in Syracuse, Sicily, for C.C. Ortigia. He won three Yugoslav Cups with the club and during his last season at the club got to the semi-finals of the EHF Cup Winners' Cup. In Italy he won three italian championship in a row.

Zovko competed in the 1984 Summer Olympics, representing Yugoslavia. He played in six matches and contributed with five goals to win the gold medal. Apart for winning the Olympic gold Zovko won a silver and bronze medal for Yugoslavia at the 1982 & 1974 World Championships.

As a manager he has coached RK Zagreb, KC Veszprém and RK Podravka, before joining Zvezda Zvenigorod in May 2011.

In April 2013, Zovko became the assistant coach of Slavko Goluža in the Croatian national handball team.

== Honours ==
=== Player ===
Medveščak Zagreb

- Yugoslav Cup (3): 1978, 1983, 1986

Ortigia Siracusa

- Serie A (3): 1987, 1988, 1989

=== Coach ===
Zagreb

- Yugoslav First League (1): 1990–91
- Croatian First League (4): 1991–92, 1992–93, 1993–94 1999–00
- Croatian Cup (4): 1992, 1993, 1994, 2000
- European Champions Cup (2): 1991–92, 1992–93, Finalist (1): 1999–00
- European Super Cup (1): 1993

Celje

- First Slovenian League (3): 1995–96, 1996–97, 1997–98
- Slovenian Cup (3): 1996, 1997, 1998

Veszprem

- Hungarian First League (5): 2001–02, 2002–03, 2003–04, 2004–05, 2005–06
- Magyar Kupa (5): 2002, 2003, 2004, 2005, 2007
- EHF Champions League Finalist (1): 2001–02
- EHF Men's Champions Trophy Finalist (1): 2002

Podravka Koprivnica

- Croatian First League (3): 2007–08, 2008–09, 2009–10
- Croatian Cup (3): 2008, 2009, 2010

Dunaferr

- EHF Cup (1): 2015–16

Individual

- Best handball coach in Croatia by SN & CHF: 1994, 1995 and 2002

== Orders ==
- Order of Danica Hrvatska with face of Franjo Bučar – 1995
