= Vladimir Jelčić =

Croatian handball player (born 1968)

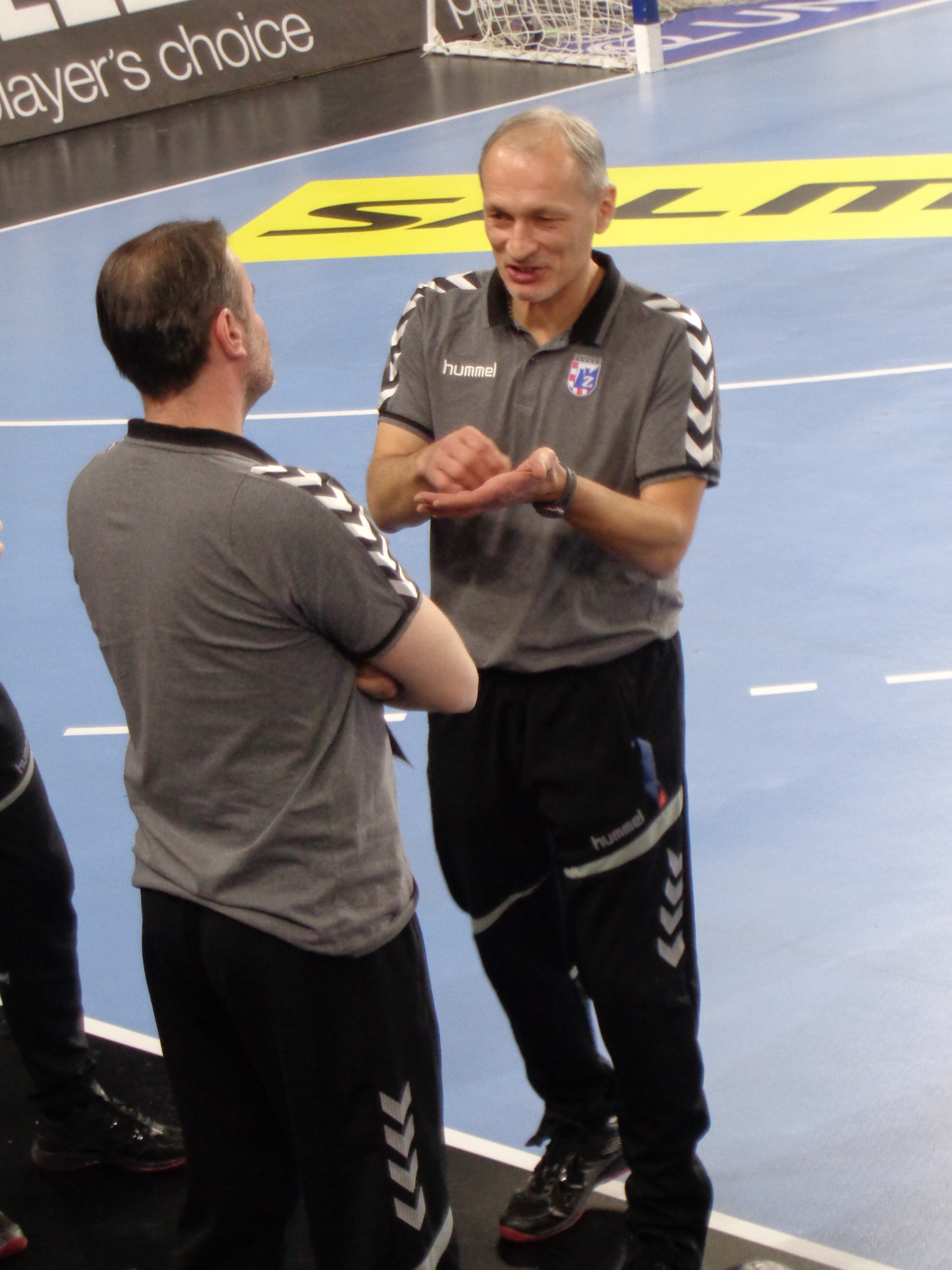
- Jelčić (right) as assistant coach of RK Zagreb in 2016

Personal information
- Nationality: Croatian
- Born: 10 October 1968 (age 58) Čapljina, SFR Yugoslavia
- Height: 1.87 m (6 ft 2 in)

Sport
- Sport: Handball
- Position: Left wing

Senior clubs
- Years: Team
- 1985–1988: Mehanika Metković
- 1988–1995: Zagreb Chromos/Loto/Badel
- 1995–1996: Zadar Gortan
- 1996–1999: Laško Pivovara Celje
- 1999–2001: Badel 1862 Zagreb
- 2001–2002: Metković Jambo
- 2002–2003: Principe Trieste
National team
Years	Team	
1987–1989	Yugoslavia U-21	
1992–1999	Croatia	57

Teams managed
- 2007–2008: RK Siscia
- 2008–2009: RK Zagreb (3rd team)
- 2010–2011: RK Zagreb (Ass. coach)
- 2012: El Jaish (Ass. coach)
- 2016–2017: RK Zagreb (Ass. coach)
Medal record
Representing Yugoslavia
U-21 World Championship
Gold medal – first place	1987 Yugoslavia	Team
Bronze medal – third place	1989 Spain	Team
Representing Croatia
Men's handball
Olympic Games
Gold medal – first place	1996 Atlanta	Team
European Championship
Bronze medal – third place	1994 Portugal	Team
Mediterranean Games
Gold medal – first place	1993 Languedoc-Roussillon	Team
Super Cup
Silver medal – second place	1999 Germany	Team

Vladimir Jelčić (born 10 October 1968) is a retired Croatian handball player. He is ex-assistant coach of RK Zagreb.

He played for the Croatia national handball team at the 1996 Summer Olympics in Atlanta, where Croatia won the gold medal.

He was part of the RK Zagreb team that won the 1992 and 1993 European Champions Cup. He also helped RK Zadar reach the semi-final of the EHF Cup in 1996 which is to date the club biggest achievement.

He is currently the assistant coach in RK Zagreb.

== Honours ==
Metković

- Croatian Cup
  - Winner (1): 2002
- Yugoslav Third League
  - Winner (1): 1985-86

Zagreb

- Croatian First A League
  - Winner (6): 1991-92, 1992-93, 1993-94, 1994-95, 1999-00, 2000-01
- Croatian Cup
  - Winner (5): 1992, 1993, 1994, 1995, 2000
- Yugoslav First League
  - Winner (2): 1988-89, 1990-91
- Yugoslav Cup
  - Winner (1): 1991
- European Champions Cup
  - Winner (2): 1991-92, 1992-93
- EHF Champions League
  - Finalist (1): 1994-95
- EHF Super Cup
  - Winner (1): 1993
  - Finalist (1): 1998

Celje

- 1. SRL
  - Winner (3): 1996-97, 1997-98, 1998-99
- Slovenian Cup
  - Winner (3): 1997, 1998, 1999

Trieste

- Serie A
  - Winner (1): 2001-02
- Coppa Italia
  - Winner (1): 2002

Individual

- Franjo Bučar State Award for Sport - 1996
- Best Croatian sports team by: COC: 1996

== Orders ==
- Order of Danica Hrvatska with face of Franjo Bučar - 1995
