= Josip Šojat =

Croatian handball player (born 1948)

Personal information
- Nationality: Croatian
- Born: 6 March 1948 (age 78) Senj, SFR Yugoslavia

Sport
- Sport: Handball

Youth career
- Years: Team
- 1961-1964: RK Senj

Senior clubs
- Years: Team
- 1961-1967: RK Senj
- 1967-1981: RK Medvešcak Zagreb
National team
- Years: Team
- 1978: Yugoslavia

Teams managed
- 1984-1988: RK Medvešcak Zagreb
- 1988-1990: RK Zamet
- 1990-1994: RK Pivovara Laško Celje
- 1994-1996: ŽRK Podravka Koprivnica
- 1996-2000: Croatia (women)
- 2000-2002: RK Pivovarna Laško Celje
- 2004-2008: ŽRK Podravka Koprivnica
- 2005-2008: Croatia (women)
Medal record
Women's Handball
Coach for Croatia
Mediterranean Games
Bronze medal – third place	2005 Almería	Head coach
Silver medal – second place	1997 Bari	Head coach

Josip Šojat (born 6 March 1948) is a former Croatian handball player.

He was the coach of the women's national team of Croatia.

His biggest achievement is winning the Women's EHF Champions League in 1996 after losing in the final in the year before.

== Honours ==
=== As player ===
Medveščak Zagreb

- Yugoslav Cup (3): 1970, 1978, 1981

=== As coach ===
Medveščak Zagreb

- Yugoslav Cup (2): 1986, 1987

Laško Pivovarna Celje

- 1. SRL (5): 1991-92, 1992-93, 1993-94, 2000-01
- Slovenian Cup (5): 1992, 1993, 1994, 1995, 2000

Podravka Koprivnica

- Croatian First A League (5): 1994-95, 1995-96, 2004-05, 2005-06, 2006-07
- Croatian Cup (3): 1995, 1996, 2006
- EHF Champions League (1): 1995-96
- EHF Champions Trophy (1): 1996

Croatia (W)

- 1996 European Championship - 6th place
- 1997 World Championship - 6th place
- 1997 Mediterranean Games - 2nd place
- 2005 Mediterranean Games - 3rd place
- 2006 European Championship - 7th place
- 2007 World Championship - 9th place
- 2008 European Championship - 8th place

Individual

- Croatian handball coach of the year by SN and CHF: 1996 and 2007
