= Ivica Obrvan =

Croatian handball player and coach (born 1966)

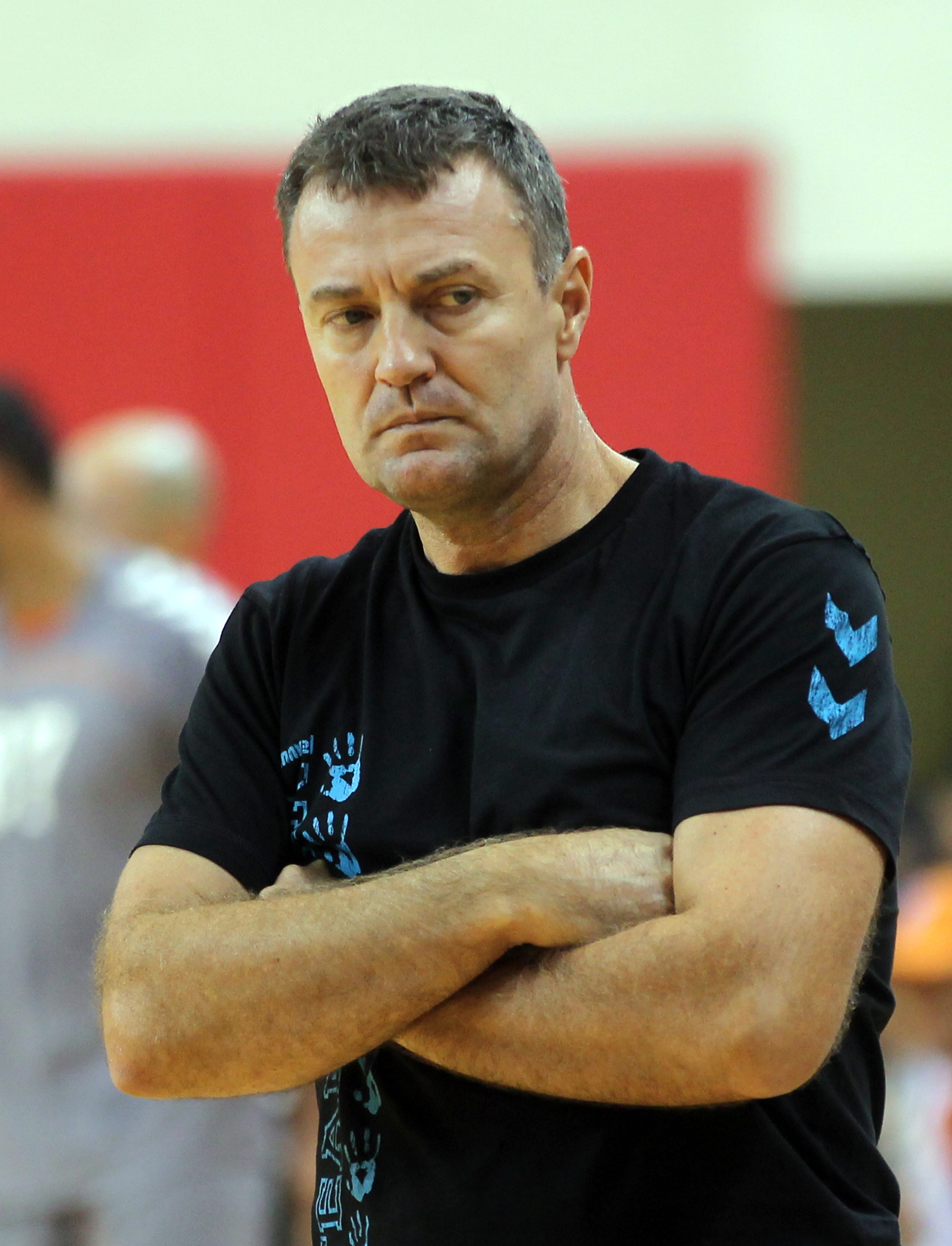
- Obrvan with RK Zagreb in 2012

Personal information
- Full name: Ivica Obrvan
- Nationality: Croatian
- Born: 2 June 1966 (age 60) Metković, SR Croatia, SFR Yugoslavia

Sport
- Sport: Handball
- Current club: Croatia (women) (manager)

Youth career
- Years: Team
- 1980–1983: RK Mehanika Metković

Senior clubs
- Years: Team
- 1983–1988: RK Mehanika Metković
- 1988–1996: Badel 1862 Zagreb
- 1996–2001: RK Metković Jambo
National team
- Years: Team
- 1991–1996: Croatia

Teams managed
- 1999–2005: RK Metković Jambo
- 2005–2006: Agram Medveščak Zagreb
- 2007–2010: RK Gorenje Velenje
- 2010–2012: RK CO Zagreb
- 2013–2016: Macedonia
- 2014–2018: Chambéry
- 2021–2022: Bosnia and Herzegovina
- 2021–2022: RK Zagreb
- 2023–: RK Podravka Koprivnica
- 2023–: Croatia (women)
Medal record
Men's handball
Representing Croatia
European Championship
Bronze medal – third place	1994 Portugal	Team
Mediterranean Games
Gold medal – first place	1993 Languedoc-Roussillon	Team

Ivica Obrvan (born 2 June 1966) is a Croatian retired handball player and current coach of both, RK Podravka Koprivnica and the Croatian women's national team.

== Honours ==
=== Player ===
Metković

- Croatian First A League
  - Runner-up (1): 1998–99
- Yugoslav Third League
  - Winner (1): 1985–86

Zagreb

- Croatian First A League
  - Winner (5): 1991–92, 1992–93, 1993–94, 1994–95, 1995–96
- Croatian Cup
  - Winner (5): 1992, 1993, 1994, 1995, 1996
- Yugoslav First League
  - Winner (2): 1988–89, 1990–91
- Yugoslav Cup
  - Winner (1): 1991
- European Champions Cup
  - Winner (2): 1991–92, 1992–93
- EHF Champions League
  - Finalist (1): 1994–95
- EHF Super Cup
  - Winner (1): 1993

=== Player-coach ===
Metković

- Croatian First A League
  - Runner-up (2): 1999–00, 2000–01
- Croatian Cup
  - Winner (1): 2001
- EHF Cup
  - Winner (1): 2000
  - Runner-up (1): 2001

=== Coach ===
Metković

- Croatian First League
  - Winner (1): 2001–02 (revoked administratively)
  - Runner-up (3): 2002–03, 2003–04, 2004–05

Agram Medveščak

- Croatian First League
  - Runner-up (1): 2005–06
- Croatian Cup
  - Runner-up (1): 2006

Gorenje Velenje

- Slovenian First League
  - Winner (1): 2008–09
- Slovenian Cup
  - Runner-up (1): 2009–10
- Slovenian Super Cup
  - Winner (1): 2009
- EHF Cup
  - Runner-up (1): 2009

Zagreb

  - Dukat Premier League
  - Winner (2): 2010–11, 2011–12
  - Croatian Cup
  - Winner (2): 2011, 2012

SEHA League

  - Third (1): 2011–12

== Orders ==
- Order of Danica Hrvatska with face of Franjo Bučar – 1995
