= RK Podravka Koprivnica =

Croatian women's handball club

- Full name: RK Podravka Koprivnica
- Short name: Podravka
- Founded: 1955
- Arena: "'Josip Samaržija-Bepo'"
- Capacity: 2,500
- Head coach: Ivica Obrvan
- League: Croatian League; WHRL
- Club colours
Home	Away

Rukometni Klub Podravka Koprivnica is a Croatian women's handball club from Koprivnica. It is the most successful club in Croatian women's handball since formation of the league in 1992. The team currently competes in the Croatia women's first handball league. They have a fan club called Red Roosters formed in 2002.

== History ==
The club was established in 1955 under the name Ivo Marinković and played its first friendly match in December against Grafičar Bjelovar. First official game was played in April 1956 against Slavija Čakovec. In 1956 team was renamed to RK Partizan. In seasons 1960/1961 and 1962/1963 Partizan became amateur champion of SR Croatia. In 1964 club changed the name to RK Podravka since it was sponsored by the factory who had the same name. The club also qualified in the first league the same year. In 1966 RK Podravka won its first national title and kept it for two years in a row. In 1972 the team was degraded in the second league but they managed to return in the first league in 1975. However, they returned in the second league in 1976 and remained there until 1980 and then again fell in the second league in 1982. In 1990 they again entered the first league and remained there until its dissolution in 1991 when Croatia gained independence. Since 1993 they were not Croatian champions only in the seasons 2003/2004, 2013/2014 and 2021/2022, however their biggest success was in 1996 when the team won Women's EHF Champions League.

== Kits ==
RK Podravka's logo until 2025

HOME

2021-

AWAY
2014–17	2018–21	2021-

THIRD

2021-

== Honours ==
- Championship of Yugoslavia

Winners (2): 1966, 1967

- Championship of Croatia

Winners (29): 1993, 1994, 1995, 1996, 1997, 1998, 1999, 2000, 2001, 2002, 2003, 2005, 2006, 2007, 2008, 2009, 2010, 2011, 2012, 2013, 2015, 2016, 2017, 2018, 2019, 2021, 2024, 2025, 2026

- Croatian Cup

Winners (28): 1993, 1994, 1995, 1996, 1997, 1998, 1999, 2000, 2001, 2002, 2003, 2004, 2006, 2008, 2009, 2010, 2011, 2012, 2013, 2015, 2016, 2017, 2019, 2022, 2023, 2024, 2025, 2026

- EHF Champions League

Winners (1): 1996

- Champions Trophy

Winners (1): 1996

== European record ==
Season	Competition	Round	Club	1st leg	2nd leg	Aggregate
2025–26	EHF Champions League	Group B	(Romania) CSM București			
2025–26	EHF Champions League	Group B	(Denmark) Odense Håndbold			
2025–26	EHF Champions League	Group B	(France) Brest Bretagne Handball			
2025–26	EHF Champions League	Group B	(Hungary) Ferencvárosi TC			
2025–26	EHF Champions League	Group B	(Slovenia) RK Krim Mercator			
2025–26	EHF Champions League	Group B	(Norway) Sola HK			
2025–26	EHF Champions League	Group B	(Denmark) Ikast Håndbold			

== Team ==
=== Current squad ===
Squad for the 2026-27 season

Goalkeepers

- 1 (Bosnia and Herzegovina) Anica Gudelj
- 12 (Croatia) Petra Marinović
- 16 (Croatia) Lora Tetec
- 98 (Croatia) Lucija Bešen

Wingers
LW

- 4 (Croatia) Katja Vuković
- 50 (Croatia) Andrea Šimara

RW

- 3 (Germany) Amelie Berger
- 8 (Croatia) Kala Kosovac

Line players

- 11 (Croatia) Mia Brkić
- 15 (Croatia) Veronika Babara
- 17 (Slovenia) Nataša Ljepoja
- 18 (Croatia) Sara Šenvald
- 31 (Croatia) Ana Debelić

Back players
LB

- 5 (Austria) Katarina Pandža
- 9 (Croatia) Ivana Fratnik
- 13 (Croatia) Dejana Milosavljević
- 44 (Croatia) Tina Barišić

CB

- 10 (Montenegro) Matea Šošo
- 64 (Austria) Ana Pandza

RB

- 7 (Croatia) Klara Birtić
- 19 (France) Aïssatou Kouyaté

=== Transfers ===
Transfers for the 2027–28 season

Joining

Leaving

- (Austria) Katarina Pandža (LB) (to (Romania) CS Rapid București)

== Technical staff ==
- Head coach: (Croatia) Ivica Obrvan
- Assistant coach: (Croatia) Marko Brezić
- Goalkeeper coach: (Croatia) Mario Posarić
- Physiotherapist: (Croatia) Bojan Savić i Asja Cestar
- Fitness coach: (Serbia) Jovan Novaković

== Notable players ==
- (Croatia) Snježana Petika
- (Croatia) Dora Krsnik
- (Croatia) Vlatka Mihoci
- (Croatia) Irina Maljko
- (Croatia) Samira Hasagić
- (Croatia) Željana Štević
- (Croatia) Andreja Hrg
- (Croatia) Renata Pavlačić
- (Croatia) Svitlana Pasičnik
- (Croatia) Miranda Tatari
- (Croatia) Andrea Penezić
- (Croatia) Anita Gaće
- (Croatia) Božica Gregurić
- (Croatia) Dijana Ivandija
- (Croatia) Ljerka Krajnović
- (Croatia) Maja Zebić
- (Croatia) Sanela Knezović
- (Croatia) Nikica Pušić-Koroljević
- (Croatia) Dijana Jovetić
- (Croatia) Andrea Čović
- (Croatia) Žana Čović
- (Croatia) Kristina Jambrović
- (Croatia) Tatjana Jukić
- (Croatia) Maja Kožnjak
- (Croatia) Dina Havić
- (Croatia) Ivana Kapitanović
- (Croatia) Barbara Stančin
- (Croatia) Aneta Benko
- (Croatia) Vesna Milanović-Litre
- (Croatia) Ana Debelić
- (Croatia) Dragica Džono
- (Croatia) Ekatarina Nemaškalo
- (Croatia) Larissa Kalaus
- (Croatia) Ivana Jelčić
- (Croatia) Selena Milošević
- (Croatia) Ljerka Vresk
- (Croatia) Ivanka Hrgović
- (Croatia) Ivana Dežić
- (Croatia) Marijeta Vidak
- (Croatia) Antonela Pensa
- (Croatia) Kristina Prkačin
- (Croatia) Antonia Tucaković
- (Croatia) Ana Turk
- (Croatia) Hannah Vuljak
- (Romania) Valentina Cozma
- (Romania) Mariana Tîrcă
- (Romania) Ionela Stanca
- (Romania) Paula Ungureanu
- (Romania) Iulia Dumanska
- (Romania) Gabriela Tănase
- (Romania) Andreea Ianasi
- (Romania) Cristina Dogaru
- (Serbia) Sanja Damnjanović
- (Serbia) Jovana Risović
- (Serbia) Jelena Živković
- (Serbia) Jelena Trifunović
- (Slovenia) Tjaša Stanko
- (Slovenia) Sergeja Stefanišin
- (Slovenia) Mojca Dercar
- (Slovenia) Maja Son
- (Slovenia) Aneja Beganovic
- (Hungary) Ágnes Farkas
- (Hungary) Helga Németh
- (Hungary) Anita Bulath
- (Hungary) Cecília Őri
- (Montenegro) Ana Đokić
- (Montenegro) Sandra Nikčević
- (Montenegro) Marta Batinović
- (Montenegro) Mirjana Milenković
- (Montenegro) Dijana Mugoša
- (North Macedonia) Andrijana Budimir
- (North Macedonia) Natalia Todorovska
- (North Macedonia) Elena Gjeorgjievska
- (Russia) (North Macedonia) Marina Lambevska
- (Russia) Natalia Chigirinova
- (Russia) Alena Ikhneva
- (Greece) Lamprini Tsàkalou
- (Angola) Azenaide Carlos
- (Belarus) Natalia Petrakova
- (Belarus) Karyna Yezhykava
- (Ukraine) Larysa Kharlanyuk
- (Ukraine) Iryna Stelmakh
- (Ukraine) Svitlana Morozova
- (Slovakia) Maria Holesová
- (Brazil) Moniky Bancilon
- (Austria) Ana Pandza

== Notable former coaches ==
- (Croatia) Josip Samaržija-Bepo
- (Croatia) Josip Šojat (1994–1996; 2004–2007)
- (Croatia) Zdravko Zovko (2007–2010)
- (Socialist Federal Republic of Yugoslavia) Vinko Kandija
- (Bosnia and Herzegovina) Senad Jagodic
- (Croatia) Goran Mrđen (2003–2004; 2013–2017; 2021–2022)
- (Croatia) Snježana Petika (2017–2018)
- (Croatia) Zlatko Saračević (2018–2021)
- (Croatia) Antonio Pranjić (interim) (Feb 2021–Jun 2021; Oct 2021)
- (Croatia) Neven Hrupec (2021)
- (Croatia) Željko Babić (2022–2023)
- (Croatia) Ivica Obrvan (2023–)
