= Hrvoje Horvat Jr. =

Croatian handball player and coach (born 1977)

Personal information
- Nationality: Croatian
- Born: 16 December 1977 (age 48) Bjelovar, SR Croatia, SFR Yugoslavia
- Height: 1.91 m (6 ft 3 in)

Sport
- Sport: Handball
- Position: Centre back

Senior clubs
- Years: Team
- –: RK Bjelovar
- –: RK Medveščak
- –: RK Zagreb
National team
- Years: Team
- –: Croatia

Teams managed
- 2011–2017: Croatia (youth)
- 2012–2016: RK Dubrava
- 2016–2021: RK Nexe Našice
- 2017–2021: Croatia (assistant)
- 2021–2023: Croatia
- 2022–2023: HSG Wetzlar
- 2023–2026: Kadetten Schaffhausen
- 2026–: RK Zagreb
Medal record
Men's beach handball
Representing Croatia
World Championship
Gold medal – first place	2008 Spain
European Championship
Gold medal – first place	2009 Norway
Gold medal – first place	2011 Croatia

Hrvoje "Cveba" Horvat (born 16 December 1977) is a Croatian handball coach and retired handball player who is the current coach of RK Zagreb.

== Early life ==
Born in the family of mother Dunja and father Hrvoje Horvat, one of the worlds best handballplayers of the 20th Century and gold medalist from the 1972 Summer Olympics in Munich, the younger Hrvoje finished primary and secondary school in his native Bjelovar, while in Zagreb he graduated from the University of Zagreb's Faculty of Kinesiology.

== Playing career ==
Horvat started playing handball at ORK Partizan from Bjelovar, where his first coach was Krunoslav "Kuna" Turković. Later he played for RK Zagreb and RK Dubrava, with short stints in Switzerland and Germany. He was a member of national teams of whole age categories under the Croatian Handball Federation, including several appearances for the senior team.

In addition to indoor handball, Horvat also played beach handball, being a member of the senior Croatian national team, with which he won the World Championship in Spain and several gold medals from European championships.

== Coaching career ==
After holding the position of player-coach at RK Dubrava until 2012, Horvat started his indoor handball coaching career in the same club in the same year. After saving Dubrava from relegation from the Croatian First League, he led the club to their placement in the final of the 2014 Croatian Cup, which they lost to powerhouse RK Zagreb.

In November 2016 Horvat was appointed head coach of RK Nexe Našice, which he led to secure a spot in the final four of the SEHA League in the 2018–19 season and previously won a place in the 2018–19 EHF Cup.

After Lino Červar became head coach of the Croatia men's national handball team in March 2017, Horvat was appointed his assistant. As a member of his coaching staff he participated in European championships in 2018 and 2020, and in World championships in 2019 and 2021. Following the latter tournament where Croatia finished in 15th place, Červar resigned and Horvat was appointed his successor as head coach of the Croatia men's national handball team. After the 2023 World Championship the Croatian Handball Federation wasn’t happy with the results of the championship, and he was sacked.

In December 2022 he became head coach of HSG Wetzlar, but was sacked already in April 2023.

== Personal life ==
His nickname, like his father Hrvoje, is Cveba, which is the Croatian word for raisin.

Hrvoje Horvat Jr. has two older sisters, Jasenka and Vanja. Jasenka is the widow of the famous handball player, Iztok Puc, and Vanja is the ex-wife of former footballer and now football manager, Zoran Mamić. Horvat's mother, Dunja, died in March 2020 from Alzheimer's disease.

== Honours ==
=== Coach ===
RK Dubrava

- Croatian Cup runner-up: 2014
