= Slavko Goluža =

Croatian handball player and coach (born 1971)

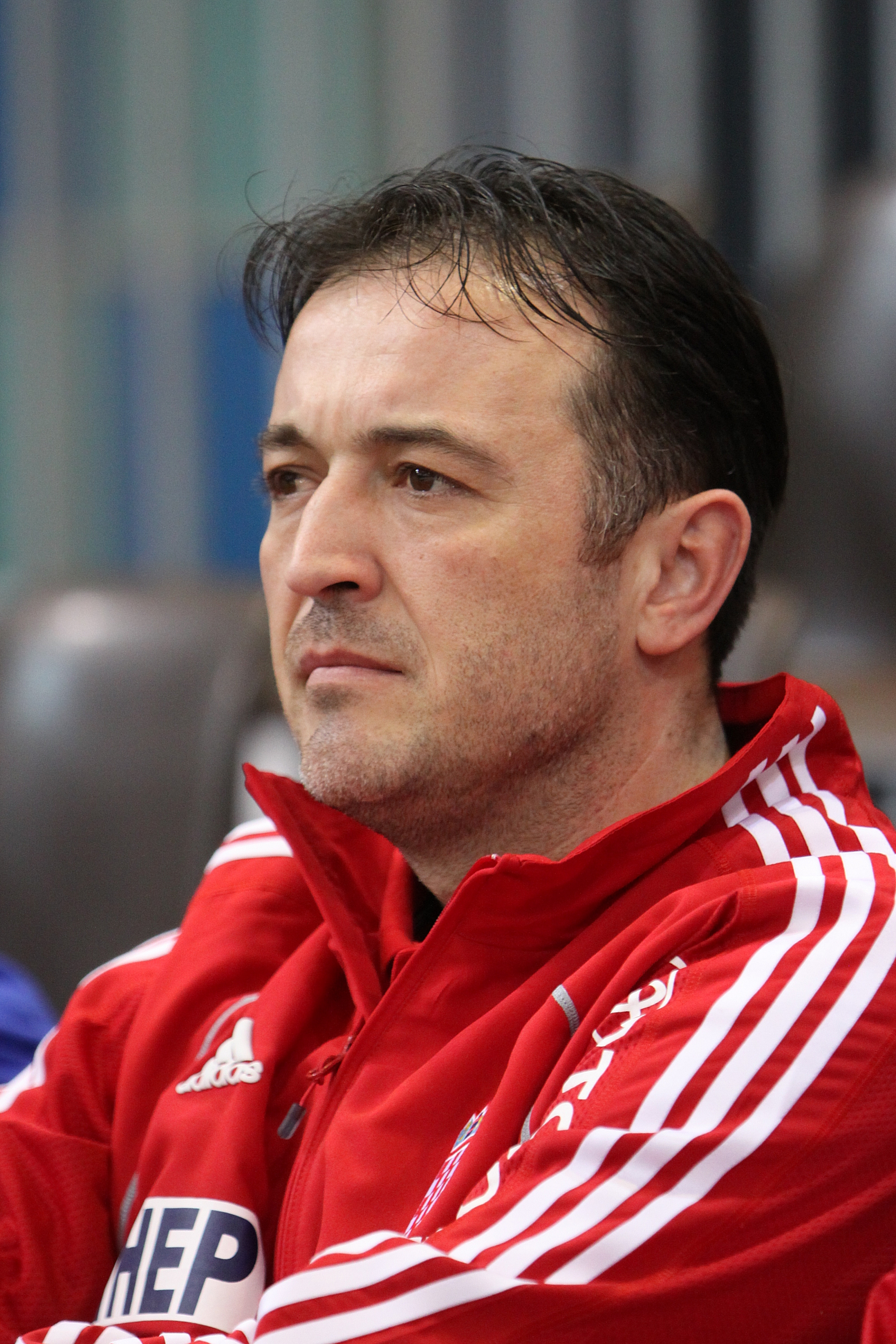

Personal information
- Nationality: Croatian
- Born: 17 September 1971 (age 55) Stolac, SR Bosnia and Herzegovina, SFR Yugoslavia
- Height: 1.95 m (6 ft 5 in)

Sport
- Sport: Handball
- Position: Centre back, left back

Youth career
- Years: Team
- RK Razvitak Metković

Senior clubs
- Years: Team
- 1988–1989: RK Razvitak Metković
- 1989–1998: Badel 1862 Zagreb
- 1998–1999: TuS Nettelstedt-Lübbecke
- 1999–2002: RK Metković Jambo
- 2002–2003: Paris Saint-Germain
- 2003–2004: Fotex Veszprém
- 2004–2006: RK CO Zagreb
National team
Years	Team	Apps	(Gls)
1992–2005	Croatia	204	(545)

Teams managed
- 2006–2010: Croatia (assistant)
- 2008–2010: RK Siscia
- 2010–2015: Croatia
- 2012–2013: RK CO Zagreb
- 2017: RK Zagreb (interim)
- 2017–2021: HT Tatran Prešov
- 2022–2023: RK Zagreb
Medal record
Men's handball
Representing Croatia
Olympic Games
Gold medal – first place	1996 Atlanta	Team
Gold medal – first place	2004 Athens	Team
Bronze medal – third place	2012 London	Coach
World Championship
Gold medal – first place	2003 Portugal	Team
Silver medal – second place	1995 Iceland	Team
Silver medal – second place	2005 Tunisia	Team
Bronze medal – third place	2013 Spain	Coach
European Championship
Bronze medal – third place	1994 Portugal	Team
Bronze medal – third place	2012 Serbia	Coach
Mediterranean Games
Gold medal – first place	1993 Languedoc-Roussillon	Team
Gold medal – first place	2001 Tunis	Team
Silver medal – second place	2013 Mersin	Coach

Slavko Goluža (born 17 September 1971) is a retired Croatian handball player and most recently coach of RK Zagreb.

== Club career ==
Goluža was born in the village of Pješivac-Kula near Stolac. He began his career with RK Mehanika Metković. At the age of 18, he moved to RK Zagreb-Chromos, with which he won two consecutive European Cups in 1992 and 1993.

He won the EHF Cup with RK Metković Jambo in 2000 and the year later the club reached the final again.

Goluža also played in Germany for TuS Nettelstedt-Lübbecke, in France for Paris Saint-Germain and in Hungary for Fotex Veszprém.

== International career ==
He was a member of the Croatian national team that won Olympic gold medals twice: at the 1996 and 2004 Summer Olympics. For over a decade he participated in all medals that Croatia had won at the World Championships (gold in 2003, silver in 1995 and 2005), and at the European Championship (bronze in 1994).

== Coaching career ==
Goluža worked as an assistant coach with the Croatian national team between 2006 and 2010 under the coaching staff of the head coach Lino Červar. He also worked as head coach for RK Siscia once and for RK CO Zagreb in two terms.

In September 2010, Goluža succeeded Červar as the head coach of the Croatian national team, guiding Croatia to the bronze medals at the 2012 European Championship, 2012 Summer Olympics and at the 2013 World Championship. In February 2015, following Croatia's surprisingly unsuccessful World Championship in Qatar, he left the bench and was replaced by his assistant Željko Babić.

In April 2017, Goluža became the head coach for HT Tatran Prešov.

== Personal life ==
Goluža is a supporter of the centre-right Croatian Democratic Union (HDZ). He was married Iva Goluža, with whom he has a son Ivan. The couple got divorced after 25 years of marriage, in 2026.

== Honours ==
=== Player ===
RK Zagreb

- Croatian First League (9): 1991–92, 1992–93, 1993–94, 1994–95, 1995–96, 1996–97, 1997–98, 2004–05, 2005–06
- Croatian Cup (9): 1992, 1993, 1994, 1995, 1996, 1997, 1998, 2005, 2006
- Yugoslav First League (1): 1990–91
- EHF Champions League (2): 1991–92, 1992–93
- European Supercup (1): 1993

RK Metković Jambo

- Croatian Cup (2): 2001, 2002
- EHF Cup (1): 2000

Fotex Veszprém

- Hungarian Premier League (1): 2003–04
- Magyar Kupa (1): 2004

=== Head coach ===
RK Zagreb

- Croatian First League (2): 2012–13, 2016–17
- Croatian Cup (2): 2013, 2017

Croatia

- Summer Olympics third place: 2012
- World Championship third place: 2013
- European Championship third place: 2012
- Mediterranean Games runner-up: 2013

=== Individual ===
- Franjo Bučar State Award for Sport: 1996, 2004, 2009
- Best Croatian handballer by Sportske novosti & HRS: 2001
- Trophy MOO for sports and promoting optimism: 2007
- Best Croatian handball coach by Sportske novosti & CHF: 2012, 2013, 2014

=== Orders ===
- Order of Danica Hrvatska with face of Franjo Bučar – 1995
- Order of Duke Trpimir with Neck Badge and Morning Star – 1996

Sporting positions
Preceded by Patrik Ćavar; 5	Captain of Croatia; 1999–2006	Succeeded by Petar Metličić; 6
