= 1991–92 Slovenian First League (men's handball) =

Slovenian First League of Handball
- Season: 1991–92
- Champions: Celje
- European Cup: Celje
- IHF Cup: Slovan

The 1991–92 Slovenian First League of Handball (known also as the Superliga) was the first season of the 1. A liga, Slovenia's premier Handball league.

== Teams for the 1991–92 season ==
Team	City	Arena	1990–91 result
Celje Pivovarna Laško	Celje	Golovec Hall	Yugoslav Second League West, 1st
Velenje	Velenje	Red Hall	Yugoslav Second League West, 3rd
Kolinska Slovan	Ljubljana	Kodeljevo Hall	Yugoslav Second League West, 4th
Slovenj Gradec	Slovenj Gradec	Dom Telesne Kulture	Yugoslav Second League West, 5th
Usnjar	Litija	Litija Sports Hall	Yugoslav Second League West, 10th
Ajdovščina	Ajdovščina	ŠC Police Hall	Yugoslav Second League West, 14th
Rudar	Trbovlje	OŠ Trbovlje Hall	Republic League, 1st
Pomurka	Bakovci	OŠ III Murska Sobota Hall	Republic League, 2nd
Inles Riko	Ribnica	ŠC Ribnica Hall	Republic League, 3rd
Preddvor	Preddvor	Planina Sports Hall	Republic League, 4th
Jadran	Kozina	Blue Hall	Republic League, 5th
Drava	Ptuj	Center Hall	Republic League, 6th

== Final table ==
	Team	Pld	W	D	L	GF	GA	Diff	Pts
1	Celje Pivovarna Laško	22	18	3	1	572	406		39
2	Kolinska Slovan	22	16	0	6	486	412		32
3	Andor Jadran	22	11	5	6	474	474		27
4	Omnikom Rudar Trbovlje	22	11	4	7	478	453		26
5	Velenje	22	10	5	7	498	455		25
6	Pomurka Bakovci	22	11	1	10	485	484		23
7	Nova Oprema Sl. Gradec	22	9	3	10	492	515		21
8	Duka Ajdovščina	22	8	3	11	491	504		19
9	Usnjar Litija	22	7	2	13	475	501		16
10	Drava Ptuj	22	6	4	12	492	514		16
11	Inles Riko Ribnica	22	3	5	14	420	500		11
12	Infotrade Preddvor	22	3	3	16	477	577		9

Champions
Relegated

Pld – Played; W – Won; L – Lost; PF – Points for; PA – Points against; Diff – Difference; Pts – Points.
