= Veronika Babara =

Croatian handballer (born 2006)

Personal information
- Nationality: Croatian
- Born: 21 June 2006 (age 20) Zadar, Croatia
- Height: 1.77 m (5 ft 10 in)

Sport
- Sport: Handball
- Position: Pivot
- Current club: RK Podravka Koprivnica
- Number: 15

Senior clubs
- Years: Team
- –2025: RK Lokomotiva Zagreb
- 2025–: RK Podravka Koprivnica
National team
| Years | Team | Apps | (Gls) |
| 2025– | Croatia | 2 | (2) |
- Updated on 19 November 2025

Veronika Babara (born 21 June 2006) is a Croatian handballer for RK Podravka Koprivnica and the Croatian national team.

She represented Croatia at the 2025 World Women's Handball Championship.
