= Mia Brkić =

Croatian handballer (born 2003)

Personal information
- Nationality: Croatian
- Born: 11 May 2003 (age 23) Zagreb, Croatia
- Height: 1.83 m (6 ft 0 in)

Sport
- Sport: Handball
- Position: Pivot
- Current club: RK Podravka Koprivnica
- Number: 11

Senior clubs
- Years: Team
- –2022: RK Sesvete Agroproteinka
- 2022–2025: Metz Handball
- 2022–2023: → Saint-Amand Handball (loan)
- 2024–2026: → RK Podravka Koprivnica (loan)
- 2026–: RK Podravka Koprivnica
National team
Years	Team	Apps	(Gls)
2023–	Croatia	31	(25)
- Updated on 29 October 2026

Mia Brkić (born 11 May 2003) is a Croatian handballer for RK Podravka Koprivnica and the Croatian national team.

She represented Croatia at the 2023 World Women's Handball Championship and the 2024 European Women's Handball Championship.
