= Ekatarina Nemaškalo =

Croatian handball player (born 1989)

Personal information
- Nationality: Croatian
- Born: 31 July 1989 (age 37) Kyiv, Ukrainian SSR, Soviet Union
- Height: 1.67 m (5 ft 6 in)

Sport
- Sport: Handball
- Position: Left wing
- Current club: Retired
- Number: 10
National team
| Years | Team | Apps | (Gls) |
| 2012–2017 | Croatia | 26 | (42) |

Ekatarina Nemaškalo (Ukrainian: Екатерина Немашкало, romanized: Ekaterina Nemashkalo; born 31 July 1989) is a Croatian former handball player who played for RK Podravka Koprivnica and the Croatian national team.

Her mother, Olena Nemashkalo, was two times world champion with Soviet union.
