= Nikša Kaleb =

Croatian handball player (born 1973)

Personal information
- Full name: Nikša Kaleb
- Nationality: Croatian
- Born: 9 March 1973 (age 53) Metković, SR Croatia, Yugoslavia
- Height: 1.84 m (6 ft 0 in)

Sport
- Sport: Handball
- Position: Left wing

Senior clubs
- Years: Team
- 1989–2004: Metković
- 2004–2008: Croatia Osiguranje Zagreb
National team
Years	Team	Apps	(Gls)
2001–2008	Croatia	79	(152)
Medal record
Representing Croatia
Men's Handball
Olympic Games
Gold medal – first place	2004 Athens	Team Competition
World Men's Handball Championship
Gold medal – first place	2003 Portugal	Team competition
Silver medal – second place	2005 Tunisia	Team competition
European Championship
Silver medal – second place	2008 Norway	Team competition

Nikša Kaleb (born 9 March 1973) is a Croatian former handball player. He is World champion from 2003 with the Croatian national team, and Olympic champion from 2004. He received a silver medal at the 2005 World Championship, and a silver medal at the 2008 European Championship.

== Career ==
Kaleb spent most of his career playing for his hometown club RK Metković. He retired from handball in 2008.

== Honours ==
Metković

- Croatian First A League
  - Winner (0): 1999-00 (Revoked)
  - Runner-up (6): 1998–99, 1999–00, 2000–01, 2001–02, 2002–03, 2003–04
- Croatian First B League
  - Winner (1): 1993–94
- Croatian Handball Cup
  - Winner (2): 2001, 2002
  - Runner-up (1): 2004
- EHF Cup
  - Winner (1): 2000
  - Runner-up (1): 2001

Zagreb

- Croatian First League
  - Winner (4): 2004–05, 2005–06, 2006–07, 2007–08
- Croatian Handball Cup
  - Winner (4): 2005, 2006, 2007, 2008
- EHF Cup
  - Runner-up (1): 2005

Individual

- Franjo Bučar State Award for Sport - 2004

== Orders ==
- Order of Danica Hrvatska with face of Franjo Bučar - 2004
