= Lino Červar =

Croatian handball coach and politician (born 1950)

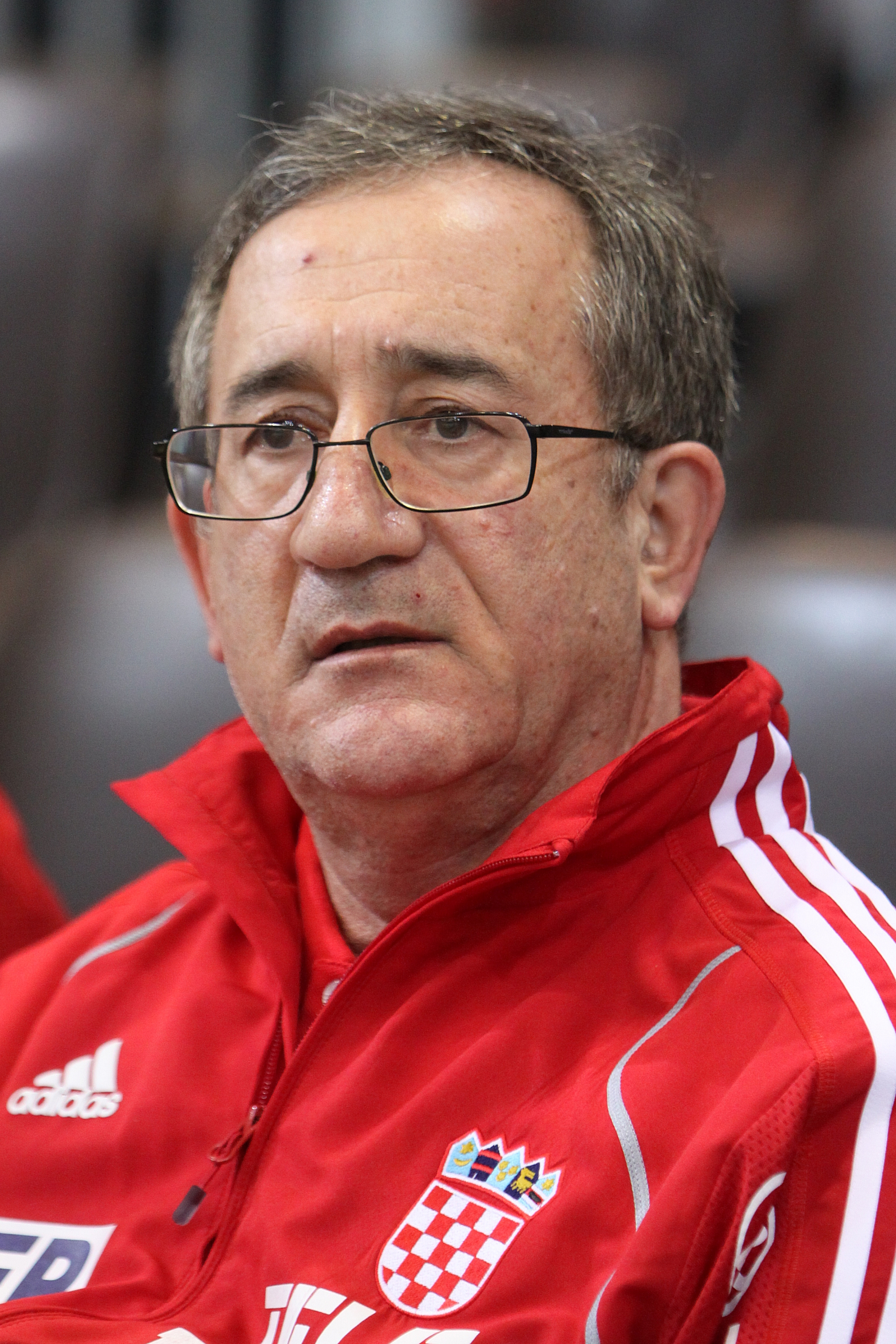
- Červar with the Croatian national team in 2010

Personal information
- Nationality: Croatian; Macedonian
- Born: 22 September 1950 (age 76) Vrsar, PR Croatia, Yugoslavia

Sport
- Sport: Handball

Teams managed
- Years: Team
- 1974–1980: RK Triko Novigrad
- 1980–1991: RK Istraturist Umag
- 1991-1992: Klagenfurt
- 1994–2000: Italy
- 2000–2001: Badel 1862 Zagreb
- 2002–2010: Croatia
- 2002–2004: Papilon Conversano
- 2004–2009: RK CO Zagreb
- 2009–2017: RK Metalurg Skopje
- 2016–2017: Macedonia
- 2017–2021: Croatia
- 2018–2019: RK Zagreb
- 2026–: RK Eurofarm Pelister
Medal record
Head Coach for Croatia
Olympic Games
Gold medal – first place	2004 Athens	Team
World Championship
Gold medal – first place	2003 Portugal
Silver medal – second place	2005 Tunisia
Silver medal – second place	2009 Croatia
European Championship
Silver medal – second place	2008 Norway
Silver medal – second place	2010 Austria
Silver medal – second place	2020 Sweden/Austria/Norway
Mediterranean Games
Silver medal – second place	2005 Almería	Team
Gold medal – first place	2018 Tarragona	Team
Head Coach for Italy
Mediterranean Games
Silver medal – second place	1997 Bari

Member of Parliament
- In office 22 December 2003 – 11 January 2008
- Succeeded by: Nevio Šetić
- Constituency: VIII electoral district

Personal details
- Party: Croatian Democratic Union
- Spouse: Klaudija Červar (m. 1975)
- Children: 2
- Education: Juraj Dobrila University of Pula

Lino Červar (born 22 September 1950) is a Croatian handball coach and former MP. In 2003 he guided Croatia men's national handball team to gold in the 2003 World Championship as well as to gold at the 2004 Olympics.

As a member of the Croatian Democratic Union (HDZ), he was a member of the Croatian Parliament from 2003 to 2008.

Apart from Croatian, Červar also holds Macedonian citizenship.

== Coaching career ==
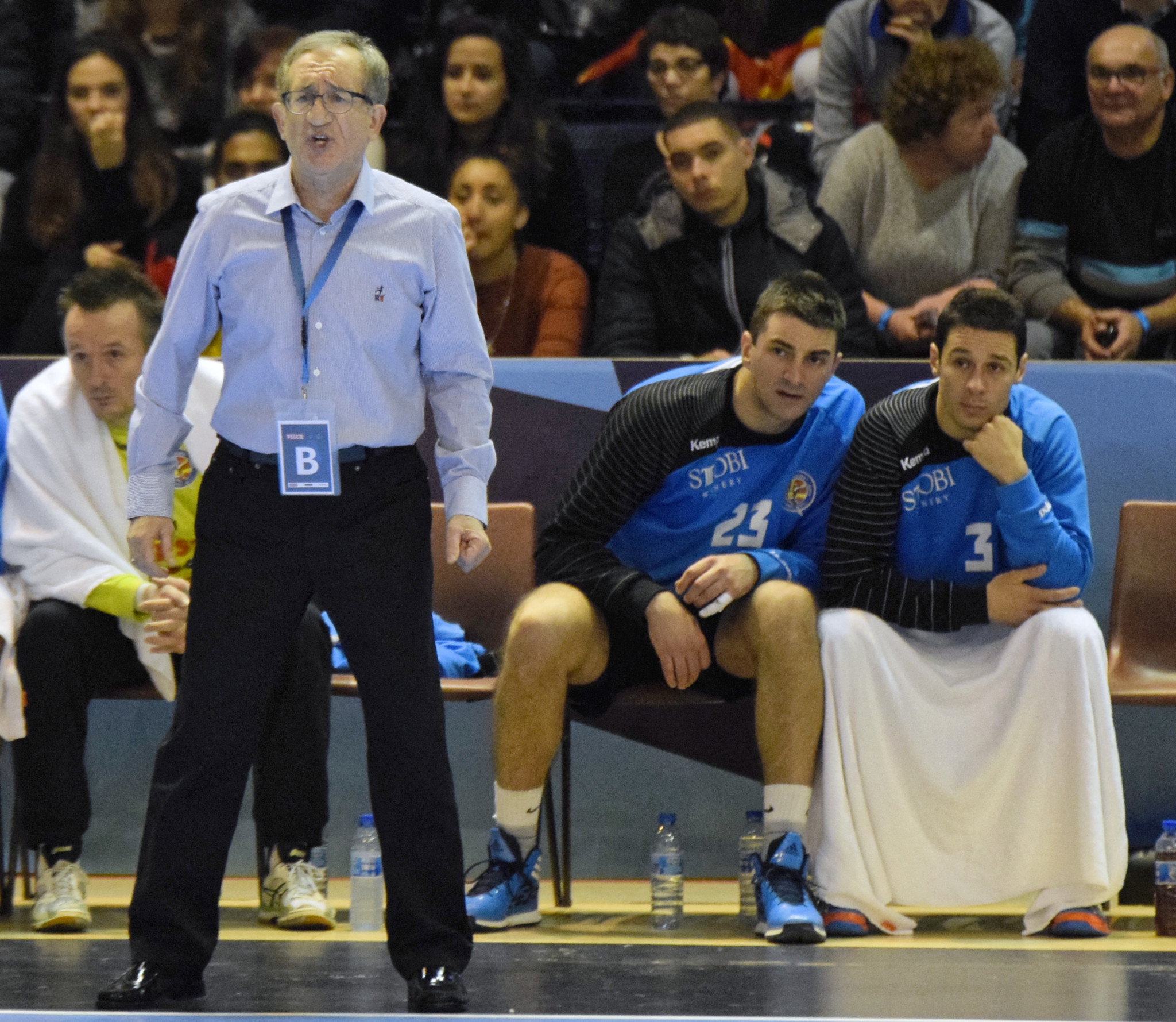
Červar coaching RK Metalurg Skopje in 2014

Červar started his club head coaching career in 1974 with RK Triko Novigrad. He was the head coach of RK Istraturist Umag from 1980 until 1991 when he was appointed as the head coach of Austrian team Klagenfurt.

In 2000 Červar was hired by Croatian powerhouse Badel 1862 Zagreb to be their head coach. He resigned from Zagreb in 2001. Between 2002 and 2004 he coached Italian team Papilon Conversano and then returned to RK Zagreb (then named Croatia Osiguranje Zagreb).

In 2009 Červar was hired by Macedonian team RK Metalurg Skopje but he left the club in April 2017 due to return in the Croatian national team as the head coach.

In June 2018 he was named the head coach of RK Zagreb for the third time in his coaching career but in November 2018 he announced his resignation from the club due to his obligations with Croatia's team.

== National team coaching career ==
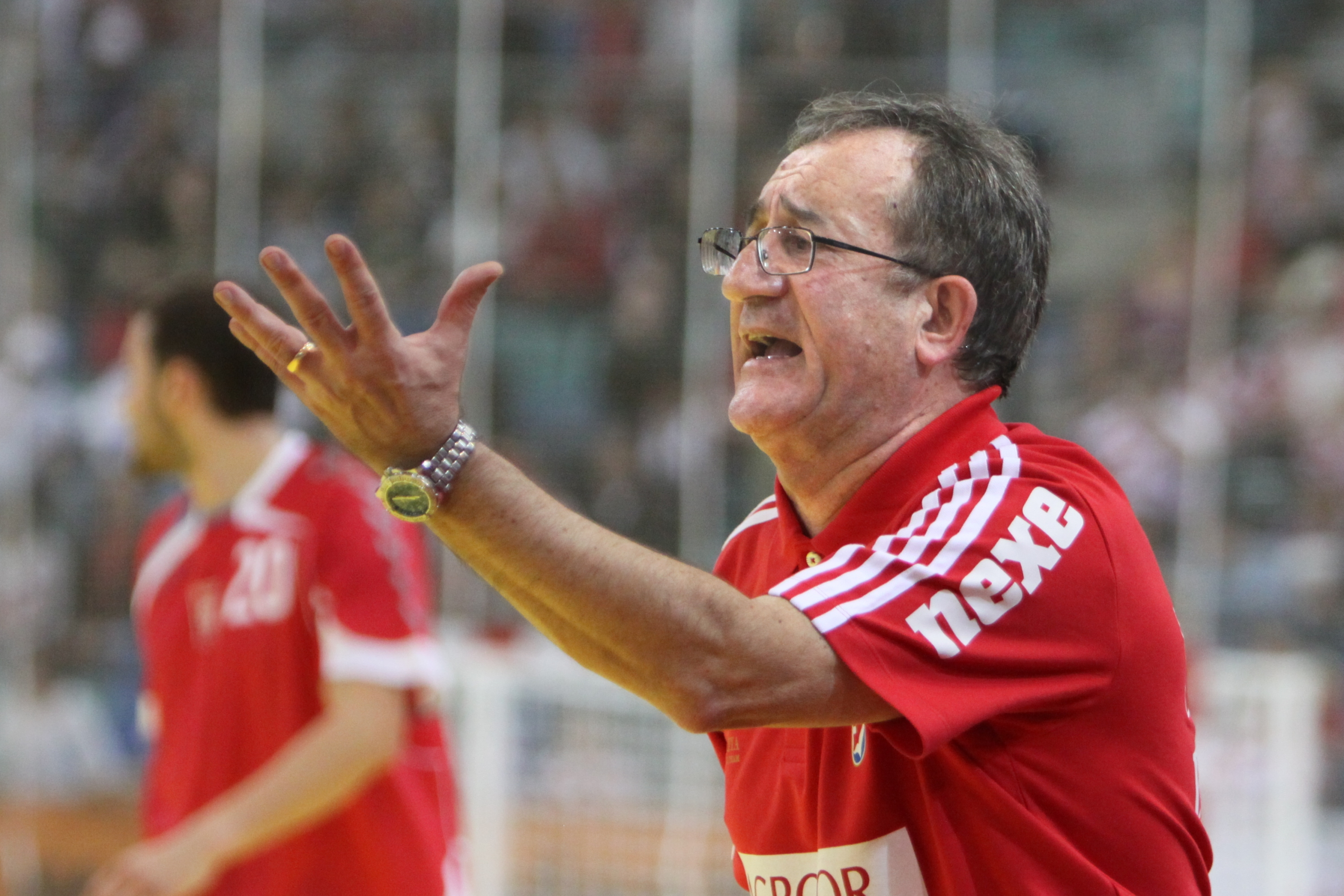
Červar coaching the Croatian national team in 2010

After serving as the head coach of the Italy men's team, Červar started his tenure coaching the Croatia men's team in 2002. He led the team to victory in the 2003 World Championship, to gold in the 2004 Summer Olympics and to silver in the 2005 World Championship. Croatia also received then silver medal at the 2008 European Championship after playing the final game against Denmark as well as at the 2009 World Championship and 2010 European Championship after playing both championships' final games against France. He parted ways with the Croatian Handball Federation in 2010.

In 2016 Červar took over the Macedonia men's team as the head coach where he stayed for the 2017 World Championship but left the bench following the poor performance at the tournament which took place in January in France.

In March 2017 Červar returned to the Croatian national team as the head coach, following the departure of Željko Babić in January the same year. In his second mandate at Croatia bench he guided the team to the fifth place at the 2018 European Championship while at the 2019 World Championship Croatia managed to win the sixth place. In July 2018 Croatia celebrated winning the Mediterranean Games tournament in Tarragona. On 26 January 2020 Červar celebrated winning his third European silver medal with Croatia, this time at the Championship in Sweden, Austria & Norway following the final game defeat from Spain. In January 2021, following a surprising debacle at the World Championship in Egypt, Červar resigned as head coach and was succeeded by his assistant Hrvoje Horvat.

== Personal life ==
Born in the village of Delići near Vrsar in Istria region of Croatia, Červar married his wife Klaudija in 1975. The couple have two daughters. He was a member of the Croatian Parliament from December 2003 to January 2008 as a member of the conservative Croatian Democratic Union (HDZ) party.

== Honours ==
=== Coach ===
==== Club ====
RK Triko Novigrad

- Croatian Regional League – West: 1977–78

RK Istraturist Umag

- Yugoslav Third League: 1980–81, 1983–84
- Yugoslav Second League: 1989–90

RK Zagreb

- Croatian First League: 2000–01, 2001–02, 2004–05, 2005–06, 2006–07, 2007–08, 2008–09
- Croatian Cup: 2005, 2006, 2007, 2008, 2009
- EHF Cup Winners' Cup runner-up: 2005

Papilon Conversano

- Serie A: 2002–03, 2003–04
- Italian Cup: 2003

RK Metalurg Skopje

- Macedonian Super League: 2009–10, 2010–11, 2011–12, 2013–14
- Macedonian Cup: 2010, 2011, 2013
- SEHA League runner-up: 2011–12

==== International ====
Italy

- 1997 Mediterranean Games: 2nd place

Croatia

- 2003 World Championship: 1st place
- 2003 Sportske novosti awards: Team of the year
- 2004 Summer Olympics: 1st place
- 2004 Franjo Bučar State Award for Sport
- 2004 Sportske novosti awards: Team of the year
- 2005 Croatia Cup: 1st place
- 2005 World Championship: 2nd place
- 2005 Mediterranean Games: 2nd place
- 2006 Croatia Cup: 1st place
- 2006 BiH Trophy: 3rd place
- 2006 World Cup in Sweden & Germany: 1st place
- 2007 Croatia Cup: 1st place
- 2008 Croatia Cup: 1st place
- 2008 European Championship: 2nd place
- 2008 Interwetten Cup: 2nd place
- 2009 World Championship: 2nd place
- 2018 Mediterranean Games: 1st place
- 2020 European Championship: 2nd place
- 2009 Sportske novosti awards: Team of the Year
- 2010 Interwetten Cup: 1st place
- 2010 European Championship: 2nd place
- 2020 European Championship: 2nd place

==== Individual ====
- Franjo Bučar State Award for Sport: 2003
- Croatian Coach of the Year: 2004
- Honoured for coaching career by Faculty of Kinesiology in Zagreb: 2009
- Matija Ljubek lifetime achievement award by the Croatian Olympic Committee: 2010
- Best handball Coach of the Year in North Macedonia: 2011
- EHF Coaching Achievement Award: 2016
