= Željko Babić (handballer) =

Croatian handball player and coach (born 1972)

Personal information
- Nationality: Croatian
- Born: 19 May 1972 (age 54) Metković, SR Croatia, SFR Yugoslavia

Sport
- Sport: Handball
- Position: Right wing
- Current club: Olympiacos (manager)

Youth career
- Years: Team
- 1982–1988: RK Opuzen
- 1988–1989: Badel 1862 Zagreb

Senior clubs
- Years: Team
- 1988–1994: Badel 1862 Zagreb
- 1994–1998: RK Metković
- 1998–2001: PM Prato
- 2001–2003: RK Metković Jambo
- 2003–2005: PM Secchia
- 2005–2006: RK Jelsa

Teams managed
- 2007–2008: RA Balić-Metličić
- 2008–2009: RK Metković
- 2009: RK Krško
- 2009–2011: RK EMC Split
- 2010–2013: Croatia (assistant)
- 2013–2015: HC Meshkov Brest
- 2015–2017: Croatia
- 2017–2018: RK Gorenje Velenje
- 2020–2022: RK Eurofarm Pelister
- 2022–2023: RK Podravka Koprivnica
- 2024–: Olympiacos
Medal record
Head Coach for Croatia
Bronze medal – third place	2016 Poland

Željko Babić (born 19 May 1972) is a Croatian retired handball player and current coach of Olympiacos.

== Playing career ==
Babić had played for the following clubs: RK PIK Neretva Opuzen, Badel 1862 Zagreb, Razvitak Metković, Secchia and Pallamano Prato, and RK Jelsa. He retired from playing professional handball in 2006.

== Coaching career ==
Babić worked as an assistant coach under the coaching staff of Slavko Goluža in the Croatian national team, winning bronze medals at the 2012 European Championship, 2012 Summer Olympics and at the 2013 World Championship, and the silver medal at the 2013 Mediterranean Games.

On 27 February 2015, he was appointed as the head coach of the Croatian national team, leading the team at the 2016 European Championship, 2016 Summer Olympics and at the 2017 World Championship. On 30 January 2017, it was reported that Babić was sacked as the head coach of the national team of Croatia due to a poor run of results and finishing fourth in the World Championship finals held in January in France.

Following the 2017–18 season, Babić was named the head coach of Slovenian club RK Gorenje Velenje. He parted ways with the club in May 2018.

On 9 January 2020, he was appointed as the head coach of RK Eurofarm Pelister in North Macedonia.

== Personal life ==
Babić was born in Metković in the family of mother Nedjeljka and father Ante Babić. He has brother Ivica who is a priest, and a sister. He married his wife Katarina Vukoja, with whom he has three children: twins Greta and Ivan, and a daughter Anđa.

== Honours ==
=== Player ===
Badel 1862 Zagreb

- Croatian First League: 1991–92, 1992–93, 1993–94
- Croatian Cup: 1992, 1993, 1994
- Yugoslav First League: 1988–89, 1990–91
- Yugoslav Cup: 1991
- European Champions Cup: 1991–92, 1992–93
- European Super Cup: 1993

RK Metković

- Croatian Cup: 2002

Pallamano Prato

- Serie A: 1998–99

=== Head coach ===
Meshkov Brest

- Belarusian First League: 2013–14, 2014–15
- Belarusian Cup: 2014, 2015
- SEHA League runner-up: 2013–14, 2014–15

Croatia

- European Championship third place: 2016

Macedonia

- Macedonian Super Cup First Place: 2021-22
