= 2002–03 Croatian First League =

First League
- Season: 2002–03
- Champions: Zagreb
- EHF Champions League: Zagreb, Metković Jambo
- EHF Cup: Bjelovar, Medveščak Infosistem
- EHF Cup Winners' Cup: Umag
- Matches played: 30

2002–03 Croatian First League was the 12th season of the Croatian handball league since its independence and the second season of the First League format.

== League table ==
	Club	P	W	D	L	G+	G−	Dif	Pts
1.	Zagreb	30	29	0	1	997	749	248	58
2.	Metković Jambo	30	23	0	7	872	799	73	46
3.	Medveščak Infosistem Zagreb	30	18	2	10	867	792	75	38
4.	Bjelovar	30	17	2	11	816	792	24	36
5.	Zamet Crotek Rijeka	30	16	2	12	805	762	43	34
6.	Varteks di Caprio Varaždin	30	16	1	13	744	727	17	33
7.	Umag	30	15	1	14	801	782	19	31
8.	Moslavina Kutina	30	15	1	14	856	847	9	31
9.	Perutnina PIPO IPC Čakovec	30	13	2	15	846	843	23	28
10.	Osijek 2000	30	12	3	15	758	787	-29	27
11.	Crikvenica	30	13	1	16	778	840	-72	27
12.	Dubrava Zagreb	30	11	1	18	759	806	-47	23
13.	Ekol Ivančica Ivanec	30	11	0	19	719	846	-127	22
14.	Split	30	9	2	19	750	811	-61	20
15.	Karlovac	30	7	1	22	767	847	-80	15
16.	Đakovo	30	5	1	24	759	864	-105	11

== Relegation play-offs ==
	Club	P	W	D	L	G+	G−	Dif	Pts	
1.	Đakovo	5	5	0	0	177	135	42	10	First League 2003-04
2.	Split	5	4	0	1	135	126	9	8	First League 2003-04
3.	Karlovac	5	3	0	2	150	134	16	6	First League 2003-04
4.	Cetinka Trilj	5	1	0	4	140	153	-13	2	
5.	Prelog	5	1	0	4	139	160	-21	2	
6.	Maksimir Princ Zagreb	5	1	0	4	144	175	-31	2	

2002-03 Croatian First League winners
(Zagreb)
Zagreb
Twelfth title

== Sources ==
- Fredi Kramer, Dražen Pinević: Hrvatski rukomet = Croatian handball, Zagreb, 2009.; page 180
- hrt.hr ljestvica i rezultati 2002./03.
