= 2003–04 Croatian First League =

First League
- Season: 2003–04
- Champions: Zagreb
- EHF Champions League: Zagreb, Metković
- EHF Cup: Perutnina PIPO IPC, Osijek Elektromodul
- EHF Cup Winners' Cup: Medveščak Infosistem Zagreb
- Matches: 38

2003–04 Croatian First League was the 13th season of the Croatian handball league since its independence and the third season of the First League format.

== League table ==
=== First phase ===
In the first part of the season, 16 teams played single-circuit league (15 matches). After 15 rounds the first six teams qualified for the Championship play-offs - playing for the Championship title and the remaining 10 in the Relegation play-offs - playing to stay in the league.

	Club	P	W	D	L	G+	G−	Dif	Pts	Qualification
1.	Zagreb	15	15	0	0	489	373	116	30	Championship play-offs
2.	Metković	15	12	1	2	460	384	76	25	Championship play-offs
3.	Zamet Crotek Rijeka	15	10	1	4	421	361	60	21	Championship play-offs
4.	Medveščak Infosistem Zagreb	15	10	1	4	434	383	51	21	Championship play-offs
5.	Osijek Elektromodul	15	10	0	5	409	390	29	20	Championship play-offs
6.	Perutnina PIPO IPC Čakovec	15	9	1	5	422	405	19	19	Championship play-offs
7.	Crikvenica	15	9	1	5	417	381	36	19	Relegation play-offs
8.	Dubrava Zagreb	15	6	0	9	452	476	-24	12	Relegation play-offs
9.	Split	15	3	4	8	367	412	-45	10	Relegation play-offs
10.	Đakovo	15	4	2	9	375	411	-36	10	Relegation play-offs
11.	Bjelovar	15	5	0	10	418	423	-5	10	Relegation play-offs
12.	Varteks di Caprio Varaždin	15	4	2	9	363	402	-39	10	Relegation play-offs
13.	Ekol Ivančica Ivanec	15	4	2	9	384	433	-49	10	Relegation play-offs
14.	Moslavina Kutina	15	3	3	9	388	449	-61	9	Relegation play-offs
15.	Umag	15	2	3	10	366	437	-71	7	Relegation play-offs
16.	Karlovac	15	3	1	11	393	438	-45	7	Relegation play-offs

=== Championship play-offs ===
Intermediate matches from the first part of the championship were transferred, and the clubs played three more times (15 matches).

	Club	P	W	D	L	G+	G−	Dif	Pts
1.	Zagreb	20	18	0	2	618	515	103	36
2.	Metković	20	11	3	6	588	510	78	25
3.	Perutnina PIP IPC Čakovec	20	10	2	8	562	592	-30	22
4.	Zamet Crotek Rijeka	20	8	1	11	540	537	3	17
5.	Medveščak Infosistem Zagreb	20	6	0	14	526	537	-9	12
6.	Osijek Elektromodul	20	3	2	15	519	610	-109	8

=== Relegation play-offs ===
Relegation play-offs determined the placement of clubs that were between 7th and 16th place in the first phase of the championship. 18 matches were played (double league system).

	Club	P	W	D	L	G+	G−	Dif	Pts
1.	Đakovo	18	10	0	8	512	483	29	23
2.	Split	18	10	0	8	534	531	3	23
3.	Ekol Ivančica Ivanec	18	11	0	7	529	532	7	23
4.	Varteks di Caprio Varaždin	18	10	0	8	518	514	4	22
5.	Crikvenica	18	9	0	9	516	524	-8	22
6.	Moslavina Kutina	18	10	0	8	585	560	25	21
7.	Dubrava Zagreb	18	7	0	10	562	573	-11	19
8.	Umag	18	9	0	9	554	532	22	18
9.	Bjelovar	18	7	0	11	504	529	-25	16
10.	Karlovac	18	6	1	11	522	554	-32	13

2003-04 Croatian First League winners
(Zagreb)
Zagreb
Thirteenth title

== Final standings ==
Gold medal	Zagreb
Silver medal	Metković
Bronze medal	Perutnina PIPO IPC
4	Zamet Crotek Rijeka
5	Medveščak Infosistem Zagreb
6	Osijek Elektromodul
7	Đakovo
8	Split
9	Ekol Ivančica Ivanec
10	Varteks di Caprio Varaždin
11	Crikvenica
12	Moslavina Kutina
13	Dubrava Zagreb
14	Umag
15	Bjelovar
16	Karlovac

Qualified for the 2004-05 EHF Champions League	Qualified for the 2004-05 EHF Cup Winners' Cup	Qualified for the 2004-05 EHF Cup

== Sources ==
- Fredi Kramer, Dražen Pinević: Hrvatski rukomet = Croatian handball, Zagreb, 2009.; str. 180
- hrt.hr, ljestvica i rezultati 1. dijela
- hrt.hr, rezultati i ljestvice drugog dijela prvenstva
