= 2001–02 Croatian First League =

First League
- Season: 2001–02
- Champions: Zagreb
- EHF Champions League: Metković Jambo
- EHF Cup Winners' Cup: Zagreb
- EHF Cup: Medveščak Infosistem Zagreb, Zamet Crotex Rijeka
- Matches played: 30

2000–01 Croatian First A League was the 11th season of the Croatian handball league since its independence and the first season of the First League format. The title was won by the green table.

== League table ==
	Club	P	W	D	L	G+	G−	Dif	Pts
1.	Zagreb	30	29	0	1	960	735	+225	58
2.	Metković Jambo	30	29	0	1	968	642	+306	52 (-6)
3.	Medveščak Infosistem Zagreb	30	17	3	10	840	811	+29	37
4.	Zamet Crotek Rijeka	30	17	1	12	801	757	+44	35
5.	Umag	30	16	1	13	778	810	-32	33
6.	Varteks di Caprio Varaždin	30	15	2	13	754	742	+12	32
7.	Brodomerkur Split	30	14	2	14	805	794	+11	30
8.	Moslavina Kutina	30	13	2	15	835	837	+2	28
9.	Đakovo	30	13	1	16	724	821	-97	27
10.	Crikvenica	30	12	0	18	709	756	-47	24
11.	Perutnina PIPO IPC Čakovec	30	10	3	17	778	861	-83	23
12.	Ekol Ivančica Ivanec	30	9	3	18	739	838	-99	21
13.	Bjelovar	30	9	2	19	722	766	-44	20
14.	Dubrava Zagreb	30	9	1	20	736	837	-101	19
15.	Karlovac	30	9	0	21	743	801	-58	18
16.	Arena Pula	30	8	1	21	733	817	-84	17

=== Relegation play-offs ===
The league was played by a single-round league system, consisting of the three last placed teams of the First League and three top placed teams of the Second League. The first three teams have been eligible for the 2002-03 Croatian First League.

	Club	P	W	D	L	G+	G−	Dif	Pts	
1.	Osijek 2000	5	4	0	1	134	118	+16	8	2002-03 Croatian First League
2.	Karlovac	5	3	1	1	132	117	+15	7	2002-03 Croatian First League
3.	Dubrava Zagreb	5	2	2	1	129	120	+9	6	2002-03 Croatian First League
4.	Arena Pula	5	3	0	2	121	105	+16	6	
5.	Zadar	5	1	0	4	110	130	-20	2	
6.	Senj	5	0	1	4	135	162	-27	1	

2001-02 Croatian First League winners
(Zagreb)
Zagreb
Eleventh title

== Sources ==
- Fredi Kramer, Dražen Pinević: Hrvatski rukomet = Croatian handball, Zagreb, 2009.; page 179
- Petar Orgulić: 50 godina rukometa u Rijeci, Rijeka, 2005; page 278
