= RK Metković =

Croatian handball team

RK Metković – Zalmo
- Full name: Rukometni klub Metković – Zalmo
- Nickname(s): Metkovci; Mehanika
- Founded: 1963; 63 years ago
- Arena: ŠD Metković, Metković
- Capacity: 3,500
- President: Nikola Veraja
- League: Croatian Handball Premier League
| Home | Away |

Rukometni klub Metković – Zalmo is a men's professional handball club from Metković, Croatia. It is the only club to win a domestic title and the Croatian Cup, except RK Zagreb. Mostly due to financial difficulties, the club has not competed in the Croatian Handball Premier League between 2010 and 2022.

== History ==
The first club was founded on 26 September 1963 under the name Mehanika ('Mechanics'). RK Metković has changed its name several times since his foundation, so it played under the names of Razvitak ('Progress'), Metković Jambo, and another team, Metković 1963, until reunification.

In 2019 in the third round of the EHF Challenge Cup, the club did not show up for a match against the Ukrainian club SC Time-Burevestnik Lugansk. The European Handball Federation subsequently banned them from international competition for 2 years and fined them 10,000 €.

== Accomplishments ==
In the 2000–01 season of the Croatian League, Metković and RK Zagreb tied for first place, but RK Zagreb had a home advantage in the finals, which were not completed. Metković finished first in the 2001–02 season of the Croatian League, but because of a player Blaženko Lacković whose transfer from RK Zagreb to Metković was not completed (it was still a case in arbitration; he played for them in a friendly match under a different name) they were moved to second place.

- Croatian League:
  - Runners-up (7): 1998–99, 1999–2000, 2000–01, 2001–02, 2002–03, 2003–04, 2004–05
- Croatian Cup:
  - Winners (2): 2000–01, 2001–02
- EHF Cup:
  - Winners (1): 1999–2000
  - Runners-up (1): 2000–01

== Notable former players ==
- (Croatia) Patrik Ćavar
- (Croatia) Blaženko Lacković
- (Croatia) Petar Metličić
- (Croatia) Ivano Balić
- (Croatia) Nikša Kaleb
- (Croatia) Davor Dominiković
- (Slovenia) Rolando Pušnik
- (Croatia) Valter Matošević
- (Croatia) Nenad Kljaić
- (Croatia) Mario Kelentrić
- (Croatia) Vladimir Jelčić
- (Croatia) Marko Kopljar
- (Croatia) Igor Karačić
- (Croatia) Željko Babić
- (Croatia) Ivan Čupić
- (Croatia) Renato Sulić
- (Croatia) Ivica Obrvan
- (Croatia) Ivan Vukas
- (Croatia) Luka Raković

== Famous coaches ==
- Slavko Goluža
- Zvonimir Serdarušić
- Ivica Obrvan
- Željko Babić
- Ivan Čupić
