= 1992–93 European Cup (handball) =

European men's club handball tournament

European Cup
- 1992–93

Tournament information
- Sport: Handball
- Dates: 15 September 1992–30 May 1993
- Administrator: IHF
- Participants: 34

Final positions
- Champions: (Croatia) Badel 1862 Zagreb
- Runner-up: (Germany) SG Wallau-Massenheim

The 1992–93 European Cup was the 33rd edition of Europe's premier club handball tournament. Badel 1862 Zagreb won their second title in a row, beating SG Wallau-Massenheim in the final.

== Knockout stage ==
=== Round 1 ===
Team 1	Agg.	Team 2	1st leg	2nd leg
RK Celje (Slovenia)	36–35	(Croatia) Zamet Rijeka	25–17	11–18
Tryst 77 HC (United Kingdom)	W.O.	(Faroe Islands) Kyndil Tórshavn		

=== Round of 32 ===
Team 1	Agg.	Team 2	1st leg	2nd leg
RK Celje (Slovenia)	35–43	(Croatia) Badel 1862 Zagreb	18–17	17–26
Maccabi Rishon LeZion (Israel)	36–35	(Luxembourg) HB Dudelange	25–17	11–18
ABC Braga (Portugal)	43–41	(Switzerland) Pfadi Winterthur	20–18	23–23
SSV Forst Brixen (Italy)	58–48	(Netherlands) HV E&O Emmen	30–23	28–25
Olse Merksem (Belgium)	30–42	(France) Vénissieux Handball	13–18	17–24
Granitas Kaunas (Lithuania)	53–38	(Georgia (country)) Shevardeni Tbilisi	25–21	28–17
Elektromos Budapest (Hungary)	44–27	(Bulgaria) Belasitsa Petrich	27–12	17–15
SKIF Krasnodar (Russia)	52–33	(Latvia) HK Dio	23–14	29–19
IF Urædd (Norway)	44–45	(Denmark) GOG Gudme	23–25	21–20
Wybrzeże Gdańsk (Poland)	36–41	(Ukraine) SKA Kyiv	20–16	16–25
Dukla Prague (Czechoslovakia)	44–39	(Turkey) Halkbank Ankara	22–18	22–21
FC Barcelona (Spain)	61–26	(Greece) Ionikos Athens	34–11	27–15
Ystads IF (Sweden)	44–43	(Finland) BK46 Karis	23–19	21–24
Kyndil Tórshavn (Faroe Islands)	40–56	(Iceland) FH	20–27	20–29
SPE Strovolos (Cyprus)	52–65	(Romania) CS Universitatea Craiova	22–34	30–31
UHK Volksbank Wien (Austria)	37–55	(Germany) SG Wallau-Massenheim	19–20	18–35

=== Round of 16 ===
Team 1	Agg.	Team 2	1st leg	2nd leg
Badel 1862 Zagreb (Croatia)	62–44	(Israel) Maccabi Rishon LeZion	30–24	32–20
ABC Braga (Portugal)	45–38	(Italy) SSV Forst Brixen	25–16	20–22
Vénissieux Handball (France)	46–41	(Lithuania) Granitas Kaunas	26–17	20–24
Elektromos Budapest (Hungary)	49–42	(Russia) SKIF Krasnodar	22–24	27–18
GOG Gudme (Denmark)	59–47	(Ukraine) SKA Kyiv	40–18	19–29
FC Barcelona (Spain)	54–42	(Czechoslovakia) Dukla Prague	32–19	22–23
FH (Iceland)	56–48	(Sweden) Ystads IF	28–26	28–22
SG Wallau-Massenheim (Germany)	47–43	(Romania) CS Universitatea Craiova	24–15	23–28

=== Quarterfinals ===
Team 1	Agg.	Team 2	1st leg	2nd leg
Badel 1862 Zagreb (Croatia)	47–43	(Portugal) ABC Braga	26–21	21–22
Vénissieux Handball (France)	42–41	(Hungary) Elektromos Budapest	20–14	22–27
FC Barcelona (Spain)	49–34	(Denmark) GOG Gudme	27–13	22–21
SG Wallau-Massenheim (Germany)	49–43	(Iceland) FH	30–24	19–19

=== Semifinals ===
Team 1	Agg.	Team 2	1st leg	2nd leg
Vénissieux Handball (France)	37–50	(Croatia) Badel 1862 Zagreb	19–23	18–27
SG Wallau-Massenheim (Germany)	46–45	(Spain) FC Barcelona	24–20	22–25

=== Finals ===
Team 1	Agg.	Team 2	1st leg	2nd leg
Badel 1862 Zagreb (Croatia)	40–39	(Germany) SG Wallau-Massenheim	22–17	18–22
