= 1991–92 European Cup (handball) =

European men's club handball tournament

European Cup
- 1991–92

Tournament information
- Sport: Handball
- Dates: 28 September 1991–15 May 1992
- Administrator: IHF
- Participants: 28

Final positions
- Champions: (Croatia) RK Zagreb
- Runner-up: (Spain) TEKA Santander

The 1991–92 European Cup was the 32nd edition of Europe's premier club handball tournament. FC Barcelona were the reigning champions. RK Zagreb won their first ever title, beating TEKA Santander in the final.

== Knockout stage ==
=== Round 1 ===
Team 1	Agg.	Team 2	1st leg	2nd leg
CSKA Sofia (Bulgaria)	42–49	(Czech Republic) Dukla Liberec	26–21	16–28
Runar Sandefjord (Norway)	48–38	(Poland) Wybrzeże Gdańsk	27–20	21–18
Initia Herstal (Belgium)	41–45	(Switzerland) Grasshoppers Zürich	19–19	22–26
BK46 Karis (Finland)	41–46	(Denmark) KIF Kolding	23–21	18–25
HV E&O Emmen (Netherlands)	41–49	(France) USAM Nîmes	20–24	21–25
Filippos Veria H.C. (Greece)	48–52	(Romania) SCM Politehnica Timișoara	28–27	20–25
Red Boys Differdange (Luxembourg)	37–53	(Israel) Hapoel Rishon LeZion	16–29	21–24
HK Drott Halmstad (Sweden)	51–55	(Iceland) Valur Reykjavík	24–27	27–28
SSV Forst Brixen (Italy)	36–47	(Germany) VfL Gummersbach	18–21	18–26
SPE Strovolos Nicosia (Cyprus)	35–76	(Hungary) Elektromos Budapest	17–33	18–43
ABC Braga (Portugal)	37–42	(Spain) TEKA Santander	20–15	17–27

=== Round 2 ===
Team 1	Agg.	Team 2	1st leg	2nd leg
RK Zagreb (Croatia)	60–42	(Czech Republic) Dukla Liberec	29–17	31–25
Runar Sandefjord (Norway)	46–49	(Soviet Union) SKIF Krasnodar	24–20	22–29
KIF Kolding (Denmark)	46–46	(Switzerland) Grasshoppers Zürich	23–17	23–29
USAM Nîmes (France)	41–32	(Romania) SCM Politehnica Timișoara	18–17	23–15
Valur Reykjavík (Iceland)	52–48	(Israel) Hapoel Rishon LeZion	25–20	27–28
UHK Volksbank Wien (Austria)	37–55	(Spain) FC Barcelona	19–24	18–31
VfL Gummersbach (Germany)	36–39	(Hungary) Budapest	21–15	15–24
ETİ Bisküvi Eskişehir (Turkey)	47–60	(Spain) TEKA Santander	30–28	17–32

=== Quarterfinals ===
Team 1	Agg.	Team 2	1st leg	2nd leg
RK Zagreb (Croatia)	50–44	(Soviet Union) SKIF Krasnodar	29–24	21–20
KIF Kolding (Denmark)	49–46	(France) USAM Nîmes	25–23	24–23
FC Barcelona (Spain)	50–34	(Iceland) Valur Reykjavík	23–19	27–15
TEKA Santander (Spain)	58–42	(Hungary) Budapest	30–18	28–24

=== Semifinals ===
Team 1	Agg.	Team 2	1st leg	2nd leg
RK Zagreb (Croatia)	46–43	(Denmark) KIF Kolding	26–17	20–26
TEKA Santander (Spain)	38–37	(Spain) FC Barcelona	14–14	24–23

=== Finals ===
Team 1	Agg.	Team 2	1st leg	2nd leg
RK Zagreb (Croatia)	50–38	(Spain) TEKA Santander	22–20	28–18
