= Croatian Handball Cup =

Handball national cup in Croatia

The Croatian Handball Cup (Croatian: Hrvatski rukometni kup) is a national team handball competition in Croatia operated by the Croatian Handball Federation. It has been held annually since Croatian independence in 1991 and succeeded the former Yugoslavian Handball Cup.

== Winners by season (men) ==
- 1991/92 Zagreb Lotto
- 1992/93 Badel 1862 Zagreb
- 1993/94 Badel 1862 Zagreb
- 1994/95 Badel 1862 Zagreb
- 1995/96 Banka Croatia Zagreb
- 1996/97 Badel 1862 Zagreb
- 1997/98 Badel 1862 Zagreb
- 1998/99 Badel 1862 Zagreb
- 1999/00 Badel 1862 Zagreb
- 2000/01 Metković Jambo
- 2001/02 Metković Jambo
- 2002/03 Zagreb
- 2003/04 Zagreb
- 2004/05 Zagreb
- 2005/06 Zagreb
- 2006/07 Croatia Osiguranje Zagreb
- 2007/08 CO Zagreb
- 2008/09 CO Zagreb
- 2009/10 CO Zagreb
- 2010/11 CO Zagreb
- 2011/12 CO Zagreb
- 2012/13 CO Zagreb
- 2013/14 CO Zagreb
- 2014/15 PPD Zagreb
- 2015/16 PPD Zagreb
- 2016/17 PPD Zagreb
- 2017/18 PPD Zagreb
- 2018/19 PPD Zagreb
- 2019/20 Voided due to the coronavirus pandemic
- 2020/21 PPD Zagreb
- 2021/22 PPD Zagreb
- 2022/23 PPD Zagreb
- 2023/24 PPD Zagreb
- 2024/25 PPD Zagreb
- 2025/26 PPD Zagreb

| Club | Titles | Years won |
|---|---|---|
| RK Zagreb | 32 | 1992, 1993, 1994, 1995, 1996, 1997, 1998, 1999, 2000, 2003, 2004, 2005, 2006, 2007, 2008, 2009, 2010, 2011, 2012, 2013, 2014, 2015, 2016, 2017, 2018, 2019, 2021, 2022, 2023, 2024, 2025, 2026 |
| RK Metković | 2 | 2001, 2002 |

== Winners by season (women) ==
- 1991/92 Lokomotiva Zagreb
- 1992/93 Podravka
- 1993/94 Podravka
- 1994/95 Podravka
- 1995/96 Podravka Vegeta
- 1996/97 Podravka Dolcela
- 1997/98 Podravka Dolcela
- 1998/99 Podravka Dolcela
- 1999/00 Podravka Dolcela
- 2000/01 Podravka Vegeta
- 2001/02 Podravka Vegeta
- 2002/03 Podravka Vegeta
- 2003/04 Podravka Vegeta
- 2004/05 Lokomotiva Zagreb
- 2005/06 Podravka Vegeta
- 2006/07 Lokomotiva Zagreb
- 2007/08 Podravka Vegeta
- 2008/09 Podravka Vegeta
- 2009/10 Podravka Vegeta
- 2010/11 Podravka Vegeta
- 2011/12 Podravka Vegeta
- 2012/13 Podravka Vegeta
- 2013/14 Lokomotiva Zagreb
- 2014/15 Podravka Vegeta
- 2015/16 Podravka Vegeta
- 2016/17 Podravka Vegeta
- 2017/18 Lokomotiva Zagreb
- 2018/19 Podravka Vegeta
- 2019/20 Voided due to the coronavirus pandemic
- 2020/21 Lokomotiva Zagreb
- 2021/22 Podravka Vegeta
- 2022/23 Podravka Vegeta
- 2023/24 Podravka Vegeta
- 2024/25 Podravka Vegeta
- 2025/26 Podravka Vegeta

| Club | Titles | Years won |
|---|---|---|
| RK Podravka Koprivnica | 28 | 1993, 1994, 1995, 1996, 1997, 1998, 1999, 2000, 2001, 2002, 2003, 2004, 2006, 2008, 2009, 2010, 2011, 2012, 2013, 2015, 2016, 2017, 2019, 2022, 2023, 2024, 2025, 2026 |
| RK Lokomotiva Zagreb | 6 | 1992, 2005, 2007, 2014, 2018, 2021 |
