= List of RK Zamet players =

Below is a list of notable and famous handballers who have played for RK Zamet. Due to incomplete data some positions are not written.

== Hall of Fame ==
This section is for players who started their career in Zamet and won at least a bronze medal with the national team. Based on the list from RK Zamet. The hall of fame was unveiled to the public September 30, 2015. The hall of fame is located in the hall of Centar Zamet.

=== Players listed ===
- Alvaro Načinović
- Valter Matošević
- Mirza Džomba
- Nikola Blažičko
- Renato Sulić
- Mateo Hrvatin

== Notable players ==
To appear in this section a player must have satisfied all of the following three criteria:

- (1) player has played at least 4 years (players listed with fewer where they made great contribution during seasons in which they played);
- (2) player has to have had an impact in season if not met criteria (1) (domestic and European);
- (3) player has played at least one international match for their national team while under contract with Zamet.;
- (Socialist Federal Republic of Yugoslavia) Stanko Jerger (1957-1963)
- (Socialist Federal Republic of Yugoslavia) Andrija Barin (1957-1964)
- (Socialist Federal Republic of Yugoslavia) Albert Lenac (1957-1962)
- (Socialist Federal Republic of Yugoslavia) Vilim Blažić (1957-1962)
- (Socialist Federal Republic of Yugoslavia) Ivan Munitić (1959-1963, 1964-1966)
- (Socialist Federal Republic of Yugoslavia) Mladenko Mišković (1963-1972)
- (Socialist Federal Republic of Yugoslavia) Simeon Kosanović (1964-1969)
- (Socialist Federal Republic of Yugoslavia) Željko Kosanović (1965-1969)
- (Socialist Federal Republic of Yugoslavia) Ratomir Jajaš (1970-1975)
- (Socialist Federal Republic of Yugoslavia) Marijan Seđak (1968-1971, 1973-1979)
- (Socialist Federal Republic of Yugoslavia) Darko Srdoč (1972-1979)
- (Socialist Federal Republic of Yugoslavia) Ivica Rimanić (1972-1974, 1977-1980)
- (Socialist Federal Republic of Yugoslavia) Željko Tomac (1973-1983)
- (Socialist Federal Republic of Yugoslavia) Željko Milanović (1974-1984)
- (Socialist Federal Republic of Yugoslavia) Željko Gašperov (1974-1982)
- (Socialist Federal Republic of Yugoslavia) Valter Marković (1975-1988)
- (Socialist Federal Republic of Yugoslavia) Darko Drobina (1976-1981)
- (Socialist Federal Republic of Yugoslavia) Williams Černeka (1976-1985)
- (Socialist Federal Republic of Yugoslavia) Jurica Lakić (1976-1981)
- (Socialist Federal Republic of Yugoslavia) Predrag Sikimić (1977-1985)
- (Socialist Federal Republic of Yugoslavia) Damir Čavlović (1977-1980, 1981-1985)
- (Socialist Federal Republic of Yugoslavia) Roberto Sošić (1979-1981)
- (Socialist Federal Republic of Yugoslavia) Valter Periša (1979-1988)
- (Socialist Federal Republic of Yugoslavia) Boris Komucki (1979-1981, 1983-1985)
- (Socialist Federal Republic of Yugoslavia) (Croatia) Darko Dunato (1979-1989, 1991-1992)
- (Socialist Federal Republic of Yugoslavia) (Croatia) Boris Dragičević (1980-1990, 1992-1993)
- (Socialist Federal Republic of Yugoslavia) Ante Vuletić (1980-1988)
- (Socialist Federal Republic of Yugoslavia) Dragan Straga (1980-1981, 1982-1988)
- (Socialist Federal Republic of Yugoslavia) Drago Žiljak (1981-1991)
- (Socialist Federal Republic of Yugoslavia) Marin Mišković (1982-1992, 1995-1998)
- (Socialist Federal Republic of Yugoslavia) Alvaro Načinović (1983-1991, 1992-1993, 1998-1999)
- (Socialist Federal Republic of Yugoslavia) Vlado Vukoje (1983-1984)
- (Socialist Federal Republic of Yugoslavia) (Croatia) Dean Ožbolt (1985-2000)
- (Socialist Federal Republic of Yugoslavia) Darko Franović (1985-1993, 1997-1999)
- (Socialist Federal Republic of Yugoslavia) Tonči Peribonio (1986-1991)
- (Socialist Federal Republic of Yugoslavia) (Croatia) Valter Matošević (1987-1993, 1996-1999, 2009–2010)
- (Socialist Federal Republic of Yugoslavia) (Croatia) Mladen Prskalo (1987-1992, 1996-2000, 2005–2006)
- (Socialist Federal Republic of Yugoslavia) (Croatia) Valner Franković (1987-1993)
- (Socialist Federal Republic of Yugoslavia) (Croatia) Igor Pejić (1988-1997, 2003)
- (Socialist Federal Republic of Yugoslavia) (Croatia) Damir Bogdanović (1988-1997, 1998-1999 2002-2006)
- (Socialist Federal Republic of Yugoslavia) (Croatia) Marin Miculinić (1988-1999, 2002)
- (Socialist Federal Republic of Yugoslavia) (Croatia) Igor Dokmanović (1990-1996, 2007-2008)
- (Socialist Federal Republic of Yugoslavia) (Croatia) Siniša Eraković (1990-1997)
- (Croatia) Sanjin Lučičanin (1992-1997)
- (Bosnia and Herzegovina) Danijel Riđić (1992-2000)
- (Croatia) Mirza Džomba (1993-1997)
- (Croatia) Nikola Blažičko (1994-1999, 2002-2004)
- (Croatia) Milan Uzelac (1995-1996, 1997-2001, 2002–2017)
- (Croatia) Robert Savković (1995-1999, 2002-2003, 2006–2007, 2009-2010)
- (Croatia) Tino Černjul (1995-1998, 2002-2005)
- (Croatia) Igor Saršon (1995-2005, 2012)
- (Croatia) Renato Sulić (1995-1999, 2000-2001)
- (Croatia) Bojan Pezelj (1995-2002)
- (Croatia) Mario Jozak (1995-2001)
- (Croatia) Irfan Smajlagić (1996-1997)
- (Croatia) Ivan Vukas (1997-2001)
- (Croatia) Silvio Ivandija (1997-1999)
- (Croatia) Vladimir Šujster (1998-1999)
- (Croatia) Borna Franić (1999-2002)
- (Bosnia and Herzegovina) Edin Bašić (1999-2001)
- (Croatia) Ivan Stevanović (1999-2007, 2010-2012)
- (Croatia) Mateo Hrvatin (2000-2009, 2010-2013, 2015–2017)
- (Croatia) Boris Batinić (2000-2004)
- (Croatia) Marko Erstić (2000-2009)
- (Croatia) Davor Šunjić (2000-2005, 2012-2013)
- (Croatia) Mirjan Horvat (2001-2005, 2007-2009)
- (North Macedonia) Petar Misovski (2001-2002)
- (Croatia) Vedran Banić (2002-2007)
- (Bosnia and Herzegovina) Zlatko Saračević (2002-2003)
- (Croatia) Jakov Gojun (2004-2008)
- (Croatia) Ivan Ćosić (2004-2009, 2011-2013)
- (Croatia) Josip Crnić (2005-2008)
- (Croatia) Marin Sakić (2005-2013)
- (Croatia) Ivan Pešić (2006-2008)
- (Croatia) Krešimir Kozina (2007-2011)
- (Croatia) Marin Kružić(2007-2013, 2016–2018)
- (Croatia) Damir Vučko (2007-2015, 2017–2018)
- (Croatia) Ivan Karabatić (2008-2009)
- (Croatia) Luka Kovačević (2008-2016)
- (Croatia) Dario Černeka (2008-2016)
- (Croatia) Dino Slavić (2008-2016)
- (Croatia) Marin Đurica (2008–2017)
- (Croatia) Bojan Lončarić (2010-2016)
- (Croatia) Matija Golik (2010–2018)
- (Croatia) Luka Mrakovčić (2011-2015)
- (Croatia) Raul Valković (2012–2017)
- (Croatia) Lovro Jotić (2014–2015)
- (Croatia) Jadranko Stojanović (2015-2017)
- (Croatia) Tin Lučin (2016-2017)

Source: www.rk-zamet.hr. Last updated 14 May 2018.

== National team players ==
This list notes Zamet players who have played made at least one appearance for a national team.

To appear in this section a player must have satisfied all of the following three criteria:

Player has played at least one international match for their national team while having played for Zamet before or after having played for their national team;

- (Bosnia and Herzegovina) Edin Bašić
- (Bosnia and Herzegovina) Danijel Riđić
- (Bosnia and Herzegovina) Aleksandar Škorić
- (Croatia) Nikola Blažičko
- (Croatia) Roberto Borčić
- (Croatia) Teo Čorić
- (Croatia) Mirza Džomba
- (Croatia) Borna Franić
- (Croatia) Valner Franković
- (Croatia) Darko Franović
- (Croatia) Mateo Hrvatin
- (Croatia) Robert Ipša
- (Croatia) Krešimir Ivanković
- (Croatia) Silvio Ivandija
- (Croatia) Lovro Jotić
- (Croatia) Božidar Jović
- (Croatia) Krešimir Kozina
- (Croatia) Tin Lučin
- (Croatia) Vladimir Ostarčević
- (Croatia) Dean Ožbolt
- (Croatia) Egon Paljar
- (Croatia) Ivan Pešić
- (Croatia) Ivan Pongračić
- (Croatia) Mladen Prskalo
- (Croatia) Diego Modrušan
- (Croatia) Ivan Stevanović
- (Croatia) Renato Sulić
- (Croatia) Vladimir Šujster
- (Croatia) Igor Vujić
- (Croatia) Ivan Vukas
- (Croatia) (Qatar) Marko Bagarić
- (Italy) Ljubomir Bošnjak-Flego
- (North Macedonia) Marjan Kolev
- (North Macedonia) Petar Misovski
- (China) Zhao Chen
- (China) Wang Quan
- (Serbia) Željko Hornjak
- (Slovakia) Michal Jančo
- (Ukraine) Jurij Hauha
- (Socialist Federal Republic of Yugoslavia) Jurica Lakić
- (Socialist Federal Republic of Yugoslavia) Ivica Rimanić
- (Socialist Federal Republic of Yugoslavia) Roberto Sošić
- (Socialist Federal Republic of Yugoslavia) Vlado Vukoje
- (Socialist Federal Republic of Yugoslavia) (Croatia) (Bosnia and Herzegovina) Zlatko Saračević
- (Socialist Federal Republic of Yugoslavia) (Croatia) Valter Matošević
- (Socialist Federal Republic of Yugoslavia) (Croatia) Alvaro Načinović
- (Socialist Federal Republic of Yugoslavia) (Croatia) Tonči Peribonio
- (Socialist Federal Republic of Yugoslavia) (Croatia) Irfan Smajlagić

Source: www.rk-zamet.hr. Last updated 14 May 2018.

Flags indicate which national team the players played for. Players listed in alphabetical order by last name.

== European Champions Cup/EHF Champions League winners ==
Winners of EHF Champions League (formerly called European Champions Cup) by player that played for Zamet.

- Alvaro Načinović (RK Zagreb Loto) - 1992
- Nino Marković (RK Zagreb Loto) - 1992
- Božidar Jović (RK Zagreb Loto), (RK Badel 1862 Zagreb) - 1992, 1993
- Tonči Peribonio (RK Badel 1862 Zagreb) - 1993
- Mirza Džomba (BM Ciudad Real) - 2006

== Homegrown players with most appearances in national team ==
#	Name	Career	Apps
1	(Socialist Federal Republic of Yugoslavia) (Croatia) Valter Matošević	1989–2004	213
2	(Croatia) Mirza Džomba	1997–2008	188
3	(Croatia) Jakov Gojun	2008–2018	168
4	(Socialist Federal Republic of Yugoslavia) (Croatia) Alvaro Načinović	1988–2000	138
5	(Croatia) Renato Sulić	2001–2008	100
6	(Croatia) Ivan Stevanović	2007–present	64
7	(Croatia) Ivan Pešić	2008–present	44
8	(Croatia) Nikola Blažičko	2002–2006	32
8	(Croatia) Ivan Vukas	2001–2006	32
9	(Croatia) Krešimir Kozina	2015–present	30
10	(Croatia) Valner Franković	1995–1997	24
11	(Croatia) Mateo Hrvatin	2008–2010	15
12	(Croatia) Mladen Prskalo	1996–1997	13
13	(Croatia) Dean Ožbolt	1991–1992	9
14	(Socialist Federal Republic of Yugoslavia) Ivica Rimanić	1979–1980	7
