= 1999–2000 RK Zamet season =

Zamet Autotrans
1999-2000 season
- President: Marko Markanović
- Coach: Ivan Munitić (until 10 Oct 1999); Damir Čavlović (from 10 Oct 1999)
- Venue: Dvorana Mladosti
- 1.A HRL: 7th
- Croatian Cup: Final
- EHF City Cup: 1/16
- Average home league attendance: 2,000

The 1999-2000 season was the 43rd season in RK Zamet’s history. It is their 8th successive season in the 1. A HRL, and 23rd successive top tier season.

== First team squad ==
Goalkeeper

- 1 (Croatia) Diego Modrušan
- 12 (Croatia) Igor Saršon
- 16 (Croatia) Valter Matošević (captain)

Wingers
RW

- 7 (Croatia) Dean Ožbolt
- 11 (Croatia) Igor Rožman

LW

- 6 (Croatia) Danijel Riđić
- 10 (Croatia) Bojan Pezelj

Line players

- 3 (Croatia) Renato Sulić
- 11 (Croatia) Mirjan Horvat
- 19 (Croatia) Adnan Kamberović

Back players
LB

- 10 (Croatia) Andrej Jurić
- 15 (Croatia) Borna Franić

CB

- 8 (Croatia) Igor Gmaz
- 13 (Bosnia and Herzegovina) Edin Bašić
- 18 (Croatia) Ivica Grga

RB

- 4 (Croatia) Milan Uzelac
- 5 (Croatia) Silvio Ivandija
- 9 (Croatia) Ivan Vukas

=== Technical staff ===
- (Croatia) President: Marko Markanović
- (Croatia) Sports director: Boris Konjuh
- (Croatia) Club Secretary: Senka Glušević
- (Croatia) Head Coach: Ivan Munitić (until 10 Oct 1999)
- (Croatia) Head Coach: Damir Čavlović (from 10 Oct 1999)
- (Croatia) Assistant Coach: Milan Rončević (until 10 Oct 1999)
- (Croatia) Assistant Coach: Sergio DePrivitellio (from 10 Oct 1999)
- (Croatia) Fizioterapist: Zlatko Kolić
- (Croatia) Tehniko: Goran Segarić

== Competitions ==
=== Overall ===
Competition	First match	Last match	Starting round	Final position	Record							
Competition	First match	Last match	Starting round	Final position	G	W	D	L	GF	GA	GD	Win %
1.A HRL - Regular season	26 September 1999	29 March 2000	Matchday 1	7th	18	7	1	10	440	553	−113	38.89
1.A HRL - Qualifiers for Championship Play-offs	8 April 2000	22 April 2000	Matchday 1	3rd	4	1	1	2	103	103	+0	25.00
1.A HRL - Relegation Play-offs	29 April 2000	27 May 2000	Matchday 1	1st	6	4	1	1	196	171	+25	66.67
Croatian Cup	6 February 2001	6 May 2001	Round of 16	Final	6	3	1	2	158	150	+8	50.00
EHF City Cup	11 November 2000	17 December 2000	Round 3	Round 4	2	0	0	2	49	59	−10	0.00
Total					36	15	4	17	946	1,036	−90	41.67

== EHF City Cup ==
=== Matches ===
3 October 1999 1/16	Pfadi Winterthur (Switzerland)	29:23	(Croatia) Zamet Autotrans Rijeka	Zürich, Switzerland
14:30 CEST (UTC+02:00)		Report		Stadium: Eulachhalle; Attendance: 1,000; Referee: Peter Hansson & Peter Olsson (Sweden)

9 October 1999 1/16	Zamet Autotrans Rijeka (Croatia)	26:30	(Switzerland) Pfadi Winterthur	Rijeka, Croatia
16:00 CEST (UTC+02:00)		Report		Stadium: Dvorana Mladosti; Attendance: 1,800; Referee: Jan Boye & Bjarne Munk Jensen (Denmark)

== 1.A HRL ==
=== League table ===
	Club	P	W	D	L	G+	G−	Dif	Pts	
1.	Badel 1862 Zagreb	18	16	0	2	538	430	+108	32	Championship play-offs
2.	Metković Jambo	18	14	0	4	474	410	+64	28	Championship play-offs
3.	Brodomerkur Split	18	11	1	6	428	384	+44	23	Championship play-offs
4.	Medveščak Osiguranje Zagreb	18	8	4	6	449	457	-8	20	Championship play-offs
5.	Wienerberger Cetera	18	6	3	9	427	457	-30	15	Qualifiers for Championship play-offs
6.	Varteks Tivar Varaždin	18	6	3	9	466	498	-32	15	Qualifiers for Championship play-offs
7.	Zamet Autotrans Rijeka	18	7	1	10	440	453	-13	15	Qualifiers for Championship play-offs
8.	Karlovac	18	6	2	10	455	471	-16	14	Relegation play-offs
9.	Moslavina Kutina	18	6	1	11	459	469	-10	13	Relegation play-offs
10.	PIPO IPC Čakovec	18	2	1	15	397	504	-107	5	Relegated

=== Matches ===
Round	Date	H/A	Opponent	Score	Venue	Report
1	26 Sep	H	Karlovac	24:23	Dvorana Mladosti	sport.iskon.hr
2	3 Oct	A	Moslavina Kutina	25:26	ŠC Kutina	sport.iskon.hr
3	17 Oct	A	Wienerberger Cetera	29:26	GD Đakovo	sport.iskon.hr
4	27 Oct	H	PIPO IPC Čakovec	24:26	Dvorana Mladosti	sport.iskon.hr
5	31 Oct	H	Varteks Tivar	26:26	Dvorana Mladosti	sport.iskon.hr
6	6 Nov	A	Metković Jambo	26:22	ŠD Metković	sport.iskon.hr
7	13 Nov	H	Brodokumer Split	20:21	Dvorana Mladosti	sport.iskon.hr
8	20 Nov	H	Medveščak Osiguranje	22:23	Dvorana Mladosti	sport.iskon.hr
9	27 Nov	A	Badel 1862 Zagreb	30:27	Kutija Šibica	sport.iskon.hr
10	4 Dec	A	Karlovac	30:25	Dvorana Mladost	sport.iskon.hr
11	19 Feb	H	Moslavina	26:23	Dvorana Mladost	sport.iskon.hr
12	26 Feb	A	PIPO IPC Čakovec	21:25	DGŠ Čakovec	sport.iskon.hr
13	4 Mar	H	Wienerberger Cetera	28:20	Dvorana Mladosti	sport.iskon.hr
14	8 Mar	A	Varteks Tivar Varaždin	28:23	Dvorana Mladosti	sport.iskon.hr
15	11 Mar	H	Metković Jambo	24:23	Dvorana Mladosti	sport.iskon.hr
16	18 Mar	A	Brodokumer Split	25:18	Arena Gripe	sportnet.rtl.hr
17	25 Mar	A	Medveščak Osiguranje	27:24	Dom Sportova	sportnet.rtl.hr
18	29 Mar	H	Badel 1862 Zagreb	30:27	Dvorana Mladosti	sportnet.rtl.hr

=== Table ===
	Club	P	W	D	L	G+	G−	Dif	Pts	
1.	Wienerberger Cetera	4	2	1	1	101	103	-2	5	Championship play-offs
2.	Varteks Tivar Varaždin	4	1	2	1	103	101	+2	4	Championship play-offs
3.	Zamet Autotrans Rijeka	4	1	1	2	103	103	0	3	Relegation Play-offs

=== Matches ===
Round	Date	H/A	Opponent	Score	Venue	Report
1	8 Apr	A	Wienerberger Cetera	29:26	GD Đakovo	sport.iskon.hr
2	14 Apr	H	Varteks Tivar Varaždin	26:26	Dvorana Mladosti	sport.iskon.hr
3	19 Apr	H	Wienerberger Cetera	28:20	Dvorana Mladosti	sport.iskon.hr
4	22 Apr	A	Varteks Tivar Varaždin	28:23	ŠD Varaždin	sport.iskon.hr

=== Relegation play-offs ===
	Club	P	W	D	L	G+	G−	Dif	Pts
1.	Zamet Autotrans Rijeka	6	4	1	1	196	171	+25	9
2.	Moslavina Kutina	6	4	0	2	179	175	+4	8
3.	Karlovac	6	3	0	3	197	184	+13	6
4.	Ekol Ivančica	6	0	1	5	158	200	-42	1

=== Matches ===
Round	Date	H/A	Opponent	Score	Venue	Report
1	29 Apr	H	Ekol Ivančica	30:30	Dvorana Mladosti	sport.iskon.hr
2	6 May	H	Karlovac	27:23	Dvorana Mladosti	sport.iskon.hr
3	13 May	A	Moslavina Kutina	27:23	ŠC Kutina	sport.iskon.hr
4	17 May	A	Ekol Ivančica	24:40	DSŠ Ivanec	sport.iskon.hr
5	20 May	A	Karlovac	33:38	Dvorana Mladost	sport.iskon.hr
6	27 May	H	Moslavina Kutina	38:34	Dvorana Mladosti	sport.iskon.hr

== Croatian Cup ==
=== Matches ===
Date	Phase of competition	Opponent	Score	Venue
Feb 2000	Round of 16	Moslavina Kutina	25:21	ŠC Kutina
Feb 2000	Round of 16	Moslavina Kutina	26:20	Dvorana Mladosti
Mar 2000	Quarter-final	Karlovac	24:27	Dvorana Mladost
Mar 2000	Quarter final	Karlovac	26:26	Dvorana Mladosti
May 2000	Semi final	Medveščak Osiguranje	22:30	Dom Sportova
6 May 2001	Final	Badel 1862 Zagreb	33:28	Dom Sportova
