= Perica Vukičević =

Croatian handball player (born 1942)

Personal information
- Nationality: Croatia Croatian
- Born: 29 September 1942 (age 84) Rijeka, SFR Yugoslavia

Sport
- Sport: Handball
- Current club: Retired

Senior clubs
- Years: Team
- 1963-1974: RK Kvarner Rijeka

Perica Vukičević (born 29 September 1942) is a former Croatian handball player.

Vukičević is one of the original players of RK Kvarner. He was also part of the golden generation of Kvarner which was led by Vlado Stenzel in the Yugoslav First League from 1970-1974.

After retiring as a player he moved to Italy and coached various club.

== Honours ==
Kvarner

- Croatian Handball Champion (2): 1969, 1970
- Croatian Unique League (1): 1969-70
- Regional League of Primorje and Istra (3): 1966-67, 1967–68, 1968–69
- Regional League of Rijeka and Karlovac (2): 1963-64, 1966–67
- Regional League of Croatia (primorje) (1): 1964-65

== Sources ==
- Petar Orgulić - 50 godina rukometa u Rijeci (2004), Adriapublic
