= RK Kvarner =

Croatian handball club

RK Kvarner Kostrena
- Full name: Rukometni klub Kvarner Kostrena
- Founded: 1963 (as RK Kvarner); 2003 (as RK Kvarner Kostrena)
- Dissolved: 2003; February 2013
- Arena: SD Kostrena
- Capacity: 1,260
- President: Marko Kosanović
- Head coach: Ivan Munitić
- League: 2. HRL
- 2011–12: 12th
- Club colours
Home	Away

RK Kvarner Rijeka (Rukometni Klub Kvarner Rijeka) was a handball club from Rijeka, Croatia, formed in 1963. It was later incorporated into Kvarner Kostrena.

== History ==
=== RK Kvarner ===
The club was founded 27 February 1963, as RK Kvarner. The first ever players of Kvarner were: Simeon Kosanović, Zvonko Ugrin, Slobodan Petković, Vladimir Babić, Josip Božić, Jerolim Ostojić, Marijan Lučić, Davor Amančić, Marijan Glavan, Perica Vukičević and Ivan Munitić alongside coach Eduard Domazet. The initiators where: Đuro Blim, Nikola Mikuličić, Eduard Domazet, Mladen Kopajtić, Ivo Kreculj, Branko Komljenović, Petar Grabovac, Petar Orgulić and Rajko Plivečić.

RK Kvarner logo

During the first ten year of the club moved up the ranks from Regional leagues to the Yugoslav First League. During their time in the First league Kvarner's coach was Vlado Stenzel who was at the time also the Yugoslavian national team coach. Stenzel's presence saw players like Zdenko Hibšer, Vlado Vukoje, Roberto Sošić and Zdravko Rađenović playing for Kvarner. These years where the highlight of Kvarner's history as they played in the Yugoslav first league. Kvarner was the first handball club in Rijeka to enter the first league. In 1969 and 1970 Kvarner was the champion of Croatia.

In 1973 Kvarner was relegated to the Second league with most of its players transferring to other clubs. The club bounced back to the First league the following season with mostly young player in the squad. These players where: Ivica Rimanić, Boris Komucki, Jurica Lakić,...

Kvarner dominated Zamet until 1977 when Zamet started to rise thru the ranks of Yugoslav handball.

=== Kvarner Zamet rivalry ===
During the 1960s a city rivalry came between RK Kvarner and RK Zamet the city's best handball clubs. Due to a lot of players moving throughout both clubs the rivalry became more serious. After nearly five years of intense matches finally in 1981 Kvarner signed defeat and gave Zamet the title of the best handball club in Rijeka. Kvarner also gave Zamet three of their best players: Boris Škara, Damir Čavlović and Drago Žiljak.

In later years Kvarner was no match for Zamet and they mostly played friendly matches since they weren't in the same league.

=== Hard times and financial troubles ===
During the 1980s Kvarner struggled eventually being relegated to regional leagues. In 1982 Kvarner was supposed to fuse with club Kozala forming RK Rijeka, but the fusing never happened. This later proved to be a big mistake. At the end of the decade Kvarner lost their dressing room to the basketball team of Kvarner. Not being able to live up to their previous results Kvarner stayed a low level club until the end of the Yugoslavian league.

With little progress made in the Croatian league in 1996 former players of the club came out of retirement, started playing for the club and eventually made it to the second division the 1.B HRL.

=== Kvarner Kostrena ===
In 2001 Marko Kosanović took over as president of the club who reinstated the club in the 3. HRL – West after nearly three years of absence. After entering 2. HRL – West the club move to Kostrena where they played in a newly built venue SD Kostrena and changed the club's name to Kvarner Kostrena. With many former players managing the club it survived for ten years playing in the third tier of Croatian handball. In 2011 due to financial problems Kvarner Kostrena dismantled their senior team wanting to focus more on their youth academy.

Two years later in February 2013 Kvarner Kostrena announced the club would be closing

=== Venue ===
From the 1960s during the end of the 1980s Kvarner played on the court of Economics high school. For about a decade they used venues around Rijeka such as Dvorana Mladosti and Dvorana Kozala.

In 2003 they moved to Kostrena in newly built venue SD Kostrena (Sportska Dvorana Kostrena).

=== Seasons ===
Season	Tier	Division	Pos.
1963	3	Rijeka Zone League	4th
1963–64	3	Regional League of Rijeka and Karlovac	1st
1964–65	3	Regional League of Croatia (primorje)	1st
1965–66	3	Regional League of Primorje and Karlovac	2nd
1966–67	3	Regional League of Primorje and Karlovac	1st
1967–68	3	Regional League of Primorje and Istra	1st
1967–68	3	Regional League of Primorje and Istra	1st
1968–69	3	Regional League of Primorje and Istra	1st
1969–70	2	Croatian Unique League	1st
1970–71	1	Yugoslav First League	12th
1971–72	1	Yugoslav First League	12th
1972–73	1	Yugoslav First League	12th
1973–74	1	Yugoslav First League	13th

Season	Tier	Division	Pos.
1974–75	2	Yugoslav Second League (West)	1st
1975–76	1	Yugoslav First League	12th
1976–77	2	Yugoslav Second League (North)	4th
1977–78	2	Yugoslav Second League (North)	3rd
1978–79	2	Yugoslav Second League (North)	5th
1979–80	2	Yugoslav Second League (North)	3rd
1980–81	2	Yugoslav Second League (North)	8th
1981–82	3	Yugoslav Second League (West)	10th
1982–83	3	Yugoslav Second League (West)	12th
1983–84	4	Primorje and Istra Regional League	2nd
1984–85	3	Croatian League (West)	9th
1985–86	4	Primorje and Istra Regional League	2nd
1986–87	4	Primorje and Istra Regional League	5th

Season	Tier	Division	Pos.
1987–88	4	Primorje and Istra Regional League	9th
1988–89	4	Primorje and Istra Regional League	10th
1989–90	4	Inter-Municipal League	5th
1990–91	4	Inter-Municipal League	6th
1992–93	3	2.HRL (West)	4th
1993–94	3	2.HRL (West)	1st
1994–95	2	1.B HRL (South)	12th
1995–96	4	3. HRL (West)	4th
1996–97	4	3. HRL (West)	1st
1997–98	3	2. HRL (West)	1st
1998–99	2	1.B HRL (South)	11th

== Kvarner Kostrena seasons ==
Season	Tier	Division	Pos.
2001–02	3	3.HRL (West)	5th
2002–03	3	3.HRL (West)	1st
2003–04	3	2.HRL (West)	8th
2004–05	2	2.HRL (West)	4th
2005–06	2	2.HRL (West)	11th
2006–07	3	3.HRL (West)	11th
2007–08	3	3.HRL (West)	11th
2008–09	3	2.HRL (West)	8th
2009–10	3	2.HRL (West)	9th
2010–11	3	2.HRL (West)	9th
2011–12	3	2.HRL (West)	12th

== Honours ==
=== Yugoslavia ===
- Yugoslav Second League – West (1): 1974–75
- Croatian Handball Champion (2): 1969, 1970
- Croatian Unique League (1): 1969–70
- Regional League of Primorje and Istra (3): 1966–67, 1967–68, 1968–69
- Regional League of Rijeka and Karlovac (2): 1963–64, 1966–67
- Regional League of Croatia (primorje) (1): 1964–65

=== Croatia ===
- 2.HRL – West (2): 1993–94, 1997–98
- 3.HRL – West (2): 1996–97, 2002–03

=== Friendly tournaments ===
- Republic day & youth day tournament (1): 1965

=== Youth ===
- Yugoslav U-21 Championship Third (2): 1973, 1976
- Croatian U-21 Championship (2): 1975, 1979
- Croatian U-23 Championship (1): 1979
- Memorial Zvonimir Škerl (1): 2002

=== Veterans ===
- 18th memorial veterans tournament (1): 2012
- Memorial Zvonimir Škerl (1): 1997

== Notable former players ==
- (Socialist Federal Republic of Yugoslavia) Marijan Glavan
- (Socialist Federal Republic of Yugoslavia) Simeon Kosanović
- (Socialist Federal Republic of Yugoslavia) Željko Kosanović
- (Socialist Federal Republic of Yugoslavia) Perica Vukičević
- (Socialist Federal Republic of Yugoslavia) Ivan Munitić
- (Socialist Federal Republic of Yugoslavia) Božidar Peter
- (Socialist Federal Republic of Yugoslavia) Zdenko Hibšer
- (Socialist Federal Republic of Yugoslavia) Roberto Sošić
- (Socialist Federal Republic of Yugoslavia) Vlado Vukoje
- (Socialist Federal Republic of Yugoslavia) Darko Drobina
- (Socialist Federal Republic of Yugoslavia) Zdravko Rađenović
- (Socialist Federal Republic of Yugoslavia) Ratko Gobo
- (Socialist Federal Republic of Yugoslavia) Boris Komucki
- (Socialist Federal Republic of Yugoslavia) Jurica Lakić
- (Socialist Federal Republic of Yugoslavia) Boris Milevoj
- (Socialist Federal Republic of Yugoslavia) Franko Mileta
- (Socialist Federal Republic of Yugoslavia) Vjekoslav Mitrović
- (Socialist Federal Republic of Yugoslavia) Ivica Pezelj
- (Socialist Federal Republic of Yugoslavia) Marijan Seđak
- (Socialist Federal Republic of Yugoslavia) Goran Turkalj
- (Socialist Federal Republic of Yugoslavia) Ivica Rimanić
- (Socialist Federal Republic of Yugoslavia) Stipe Crnković
- (Socialist Federal Republic of Yugoslavia) Drago Žiljak
- (Socialist Federal Republic of Yugoslavia) Tomislav Kruljac
- (Socialist Federal Republic of Yugoslavia) Marko Kosanović
- (Socialist Federal Republic of Yugoslavia) Damir Čavlović
- (Socialist Federal Republic of Yugoslavia) Tomislav Čavlović
- (Socialist Federal Republic of Yugoslavia) Dragan Straga
- (Socialist Federal Republic of Yugoslavia) Dubravko Konjuh
- (Socialist Federal Republic of Yugoslavia) Darko Srdoč
- (Socialist Federal Republic of Yugoslavia) Branko Crnković
- (Socialist Federal Republic of Yugoslavia) Stipe Crnković
- (Socialist Federal Republic of Yugoslavia) Mićo Bjelovuk
- (Socialist Federal Republic of Yugoslavia) (Croatia) Alfred Franković
- (Socialist Federal Republic of Yugoslavia) (Croatia) Branko Milošević
- (Socialist Federal Republic of Yugoslavia) (Croatia) Duško Milošević
- (Croatia) Robert Živković
- (Croatia) Milan Uzelac
- (Croatia) Adnan Kamberović
- (Croatia) Dalibor Prokopić
- (Croatia) Nikola Kosanović
- (Croatia) Josip Crnić
- (Croatia) Filip Briški
- (Croatia) Antonio Pribanić

== Coaches ==
- 1963 – Eduard Domazet (Socialist Federal Republic of Yugoslavia)
- 1963–1965 – Romeo Frnić (Socialist Federal Republic of Yugoslavia)
- 1965–1966 – Božidar Peter (Socialist Federal Republic of Yugoslavia)
- 1966–1967 – Josip Božić (Socialist Federal Republic of Yugoslavia)
- 1967–1970 – Božidar Peter (Socialist Federal Republic of Yugoslavia)
- 1970–1973 – Vlado Stenzel (Socialist Federal Republic of Yugoslavia)
- 1973–1975 – Ivan Munitić (Socialist Federal Republic of Yugoslavia)
- 1975 – Jurica Lakić (Socialist Federal Republic of Yugoslavia)
- 1975–1978 – Božidar Peter (Socialist Federal Republic of Yugoslavia)
- 1978–1979 – Ivan Munitić (Socialist Federal Republic of Yugoslavia)
- 1979–1980 – Božidar Peter (Socialist Federal Republic of Yugoslavia)
- 1980–1982 – Marijan Seđak (Socialist Federal Republic of Yugoslavia)
- 1982–1983 – Ivica Pezelj (Socialist Federal Republic of Yugoslavia)
- 1983–1988 – Bojan Skomina (Socialist Federal Republic of Yugoslavia)
- 1988–1989 – Branimir Čutić (Socialist Federal Republic of Yugoslavia)
- 1989–1992 – Zvonko Ugrin (Socialist Federal Republic of Yugoslavia)
- 1992–1993 – Duško Milošević (Croatia)
- 1993–1994 – Zdenko Hibšer, Duško Milošević & Marko Kosanović (Croatia)
- 1994–1995 – Marko Kosanović (Croatia)
- 1995–1999 – Josip Božić (Croatia)
- 2001–2002 – Esad Subašić & Damir Čavlović (Croatia)
- 2002 – Esad Subašić (Croatia)
- 2003–2007 – Ivan Munitić (Croatia)
- 2008–2009 – Mladen Prskalo (Croatia)
- 2009–2011 – Drago Žiljak (Croatia)
- 2011–2012 – Ivan Munitić (Croatia)

== Presidents ==
- 1963–1965 – Đuro Blim (Socialist Federal Republic of Yugoslavia)
- 1965 – Nedjeljko Funduk (Socialist Federal Republic of Yugoslavia)
- 1965 – Igor Štefanović (Socialist Federal Republic of Yugoslavia)
- 1965–1969 – Ivo Baretić (Socialist Federal Republic of Yugoslavia)
- 1969–1971 – Nikola Mikuličić (Socialist Federal Republic of Yugoslavia)
- 1971–1974 – Nikola Samardžija (Socialist Federal Republic of Yugoslavia)
- 1974–1977 – Ivan Oštarić (Socialist Federal Republic of Yugoslavia)
- 1977–1979 – Ivan Pilepić (Socialist Federal Republic of Yugoslavia)
- 1979–1982 – Rade Škorić (Socialist Federal Republic of Yugoslavia)
- 1982–1986 – Dean Baki (Socialist Federal Republic of Yugoslavia)
- 1986–1988 – Branko Rumora (Socialist Federal Republic of Yugoslavia)
- 1988–1990 – Graciano Vorić (Socialist Federal Republic of Yugoslavia)
- 1990–1992 – Edi Franković (Socialist Federal Republic of Yugoslavia)
- 1992–1996 – Jurica Vukić (Croatia)
- 1996–2000 – Vladimir Cipović (Croatia)
- 2001–2008 – Marko Kosanović (Croatia)
- 2008–2013 – Nikola Kosanović (Croatia)
