= Kosanović =

Kosanović (Serbian Cyrillic: Косановић, pronounced [kosǎːnoʋitɕ]) is a Slavic surname. Many Serbs and Croats have this surname. Notable people with the surname include:

- Milan Kosanović (1932–1989), Yugoslav Serb rugby league footballer
- Milorad Kosanović (1951–2026), Serbian football player and manager
- Miloš Kosanović (born 1990), Serbian footballer
- Simeon Kosanović (born 1933), Croatian handball player
- Željko Kosanović (born 1934), Croatian handball player
- Zoran Kosanović (1956–1998), Serbian-Canadian table tennis player

== See also ==
- Kusanović
