= Zdenko Hibšer =

Croatian handball player

Personal information
- Nationality: Croatian
- Born: 8 February 1950 Rijeka, SFR Yugoslavia
- Died: 25 July 2014 (aged 64) Rijeka, Croatia

Sport
- Sport: Handball
- Current club: Retired
- Number: 4

Youth career
- Years: Team
- 1963-1967: RK Kvarner

Senior clubs
- Years: Team
- 1967-1976: RK Kvarner
- 1976-1978: RK Matulji
National team
Years	Team	Apps	(Gls)
1970	Yugoslavia	3	(6)

Teams managed
- 1976: RK Kvarner (Assistant coach)
- –: RK Matulji
- 1993-1994: RK Kvarner

Zdenko Hibšer (8 February 1950 - 25 July 2014) was a Croatian handball player and former coach.

== Career ==
Hibšer entered the first team of Kvarner in 1967. He quickly entered Yugoslav First League with his team and was part of the golden generation of RK Kvarner.

Hibšer played three matches for the Yugoslav national team in November of 1970 at the Carpat Cup in Romania. He scored six goals.

After being suspended in 1976 by the disciplinary committee for missing a match against Partizan Bjelovar due to a work engagement he left Kvarner and joined RK Matulji. He played for Matulji for two seasons and later coached the side.

In 1994 alongside Duško Milošević and Marko Kosanović, Hibšer coached Kvarner and gained promotion to the First B League.

== Death ==
Zdenko Hibšer died on 25 July 2014 at the age of 64. He was buried at Kozala cemetery.

== Honours ==
=== As Player ===
Kvarner

- Yugoslav Second League - West (1): 1974-75
- Croatian Unique League (1): 1969-70
- Regional League of Primorje and Istra (2): 1967–68, 1968–69

=== As coach ===
Kvarner

- 2. HRL - West (1): 1993-94

Individual

- Best handball player of Rijeka: 1970 and 1971
