= Ekaterina Gaiduk =

Russian handball player

Personal information
- Nationality: Russian
- Born: 7 March 1989 (age 37) Tolyatti, Soviet Union
- Height: 1.82 m (6 ft 0 in)

Sport
- Sport: Handball
- Position: Right back
- Current club: HC Lada
- Number: 18

Senior clubs
- Years: Team
- 2006–2014: Lada Togliatti
- 2014–2015: HCM Baia Mare
- 2015–2016: Rostov-Don
- 2018–: HC Lada
National team
Years	Team	Apps	(Gls)
2008–	Russia	75	(207)
Medal record
European Championship
Silver medal – second place	2006 Sweden	Team
Bronze medal – third place	2008 Macedonia	Team

Ekaterina Evgenievna Gaiduk (née Davydenko; born 8 March 1989) is a Russian handball player who plays for HC Lada.

She was part of Russia's team at the 2012 Summer Olympics.

== International honours ==
- EHF Champions League:
  - Finalist: 2007
  - Semifinalist: 2008
- EHF Cup:
  - Winner: 2012, 2014
  - Semifinalist: 2011
- Baia Mare Champions Trophy:
  - Winner: 2014
- European Championship:
  - Silver Medalist: 2006
  - Bronze Medalist: 2008
- GF World Cup:
  - Winner: 2011

== Individual awards ==
- EHF Cup Top Scorer: 2012
