= Golden League (handball) =

Handball competition

The Golden League tournament is a four-nation friendly handball tournament, arranged by the Danish, Norwegian and Dutch handball associations.

In first tournament was held in 2012, and was exclusively a women's tournament. In 2013 the men's tournament was added.

Until 2021 the tournament was hosted by French Handball Federation alongside Denmark and Norway. When they withdrew, the Netherlands Handball Association was invited.

== Medals ==
=== Women's ===
Rank	Nation	Gold	Silver	Bronze	Total
1	Norway	12	4	2	18
2	Denmark	3	6	8	17
3	France	2	4	4	10
4	Netherlands	2	2	3	7
5	Russia	0	2	2	4
6	Poland	0	1	0	1
Totals (6 entries)		19	19	19	57

=== Men's ===
Rank	Nation	Gold	Silver	Bronze	Total
1	Denmark	10	5	2	17
2	France	6	4	1	11
3	Norway	1	3	8	12
4	Spain	0	2	1	3
5	Netherlands	0	1	2	3
6	Egypt	0	1	0	1
6	Iceland	0	1	0	1
8	Croatia	0	0	2	2
9	Qatar	0	0	1	1
Totals (9 entries)		17	17	17	51

== See also ==
- Posten Cup
- GF World Cup
