= Vukoje =

Vukoje is a surname. Notable people with the surname include:

- Nedeljko Vukoje (born 1943), Croatian footballer
- Vlado Vukoje (born 1952), Serbian handball player
