= Marijan Seđak =

Croatian handball player and coach (born 1952)

Marijan Sedjak
Personal information
- Full name: Marijan Seđak
- Nationality: Croatian
- Born: 24 March 1952 (age 74) Bjelovar, SFR Yugoslavia

Sport
- Sport: Handball
- Number: 8

Youth career
- Years: Team
- 1964-1969: RK Partizan Zamet

Senior clubs
- Years: Team
- 1969-1970: RK Partizan Zamet
- 1970-1972: RK Kvarner Rijeka
- 1972-1978: RK Partizan Zamet

Teams managed
- 1977-1979: RK Partizan Rijeka (Assistant)
- 1979-1980: RK Aleksandar Mamić
- 1980-1982: RK Kvarner Rijeka
- 1982-1985: ŽRK Zamet Rijeka
- 1986-1987: RK Zamet Rijeka
- 1989-1992: Spjelkavik Women
- 1990-1991: Bergsøy IL Men
- 1992-2001: Sola HK Women
- 2001-2004: Lunner IL Women
- 2005-2006: Fjellhammer IL
- 2006-2007: Lillestrøm Topphåndball
- 2007-2008: Kolbotn
- 2008-2009: Fjellhammer IL
- 2009-2011: Njårds Ladies (Assistant)
- 2011-2013: Raumnes & Årnes IL

Marijan Seđak (born 24 March 1952) is a Croatian handball coach and former player.

== Career ==
Marijan Seđak grew up in Rijeka and started his handball career with Partizan Zamet. After winning the regional league in his first season he was invited by Vlado Stenzel to join RK Kvarner in the Yugoslav First League.

Wanting to concentrate more on his studies at the time, Seđak returned to Partizan Zamet, who were then still in the third tier. He played for the club until 1978. In that time the club moved from the third to the first tier. Seđak retired from playing handball in 1978 but stayed on as assistant coach for one more season.

His first head coaching job was with RK Aleksandar Mamić. He then coached RK Kvarner for two seasons. In 1982 he began coaching ŽRK Zamet. In 1987 Seđak coached RK Zamet and led them to the Yugoslav First League.

In 1988 he moved to Norway where he has coached several teams including Spjelkavik, Bergsøy IL, Sola HK, Lunner IL. His son Dalibor is also a coach.

== Honours ==
=== Player ===
Zamet

- Yugoslav Second League (1): 1977-78
- Yugoslav Third League (1): 1976-77
- Regional League of Primorje and Istra (1): 1969-70

=== Coach ===
Zamet

- Yugoslav Second League (1): 1986–87

Spjelkavik

- 2. Division (1): 1990-1991
- 3. Division (1): 1989-1990

Sola

- 1. Division (2): 1995-1996, 1997–98
- 2. Division (1): 1994-1995
- 3. Division (1): 1993-1994

Fjellhammer IL

- 1. Division (1): 2005-2006

Raumnes & Årnes Idrettslag

- 4. Division (1): 2011-12

Individual

- Award for success full coaching in Rijeka - 1979
- Best head coach of 1984, 1987 by: Handball Federation of Rijeka
