= Jurica Lakić =

Croatian handball player (1953-1982)

Personal information
- Nationality: Croatian
- Born: 11 May 1953 Karlovac, SFR Yugoslavia
- Died: 28 May 1982 (aged 29) Rijeka, SFR Yugoslavia

Sport
- Sport: Handball
- Number: 11

Youth career
- Years: Team
- 1967-1968: RK Dubovac

Senior clubs
- Years: Team
- 1968-1970: RK Dubovac
- 1970-1976: RK Kvarner
- 1976-1981: RK Zamet
National team
Years	Team		
1972	SR Croatia		
1972-1973	Yugoslavia	5	(?)
Title
- 1976-1982: Referee

Teams managed
- 1975: RK Kvarner
- 1980-1981: RK Zamet

Jurica Lakić (11 May 1953 - 9 September 1982) is a former Croatian handball player.

== Career ==
Jurica Lakić was born on 11 May 1953. He started playing handball in RK Dubovac.

He started his senior career in RK Dubovac at the age of 15. In 1970 Lakić moved to RK Kvarner in Rijeka on the call of head coach Vlado Stenzel and played in the golden generation of Kvarner in the Yugoslav First League. In 1972 Lakić played for the national team of SR Croatia and a year later he made 5 appearances for Yugoslavia. Lakić was a key player in RK Kvarner all throughout his six year stay. In 1975 after the departure of Ivan Munitić he coached the team for a couple of months.

In 1976 after Lakić was denied bigger pay from RK Kvarner he left the club and moved to city rivals RK Partizan Zamet. He helped the side rise from the third league to the first league.

== Personal life ==
He was married to female handball player Branka Zuber.

== Death ==
On 9 September 1982 Jurica Lakić died in a car accident in front of his house. A police cruiser collided with Lakić's car on the left side where he was sitting. He died on the operating table.

== Tribute ==
From 1984 to 1989 there was a memorial tournament for Jurica Lakić organized in Karlovac and Rijeka by his former clubs respectively.

== Honours ==
Kvarner

- Yugoslav Second League (1): 1974-75

Zamet

- Yugoslav Second League (1): 1977-78
- Yugoslav Third League (1): 1976-77
