= Damir Čavlović =

Croatian handball player (born 1952)

Personal information
- Nationality: Croatian
- Born: 28 January 1952 (age 74) Karlovac, FPR Yugoslavia

Sport
- Sport: Handball
- Current club: Retired
- Number: 9

Youth career
- Years: Team
- 1967–1968: RK Dubovac

Senior clubs
- Years: Team
- 1968–1970: RK Dubovac
- 1970–1976: RK Kvarner
- 1976–1977: HC Rovetto
- 1977–1980: Partizan Rijeka
- 1980–1981: RK Kvarner
- 1981–1985: RK Zamet
National team
- Years: Team
- 1971–1972: Yugoslavia U-21
- 1973: SR Croatia

Teams managed
- 1987–1989: RK Zamet U-18
- 1989–1990: RK Zamet U-21
- 1990–1991: RK Zamet
- 1991: ŽRK Zamet
- 1993–1995: Karlovačka Pivovara
- 1995–1997: RK Split Brodokumer
- 1996: Croatia
- 1997–1998: ŽRK Tvin Trgocentar
- 1998–1999: Pallamano Alpi Prato
- 1999–2002: RK Zamet Crotek
- 2003: RK Kvarner Kostrena
- 2003–2004: RK Zamet (assistant coach)
- 2005–2007: ŽRK Zamet
- 2007–2009: RK Zamet II
- 2009–2010: RK Zamet
- 2011–2014: RK Zamet U-16
- 2014–2017: RK Trsat U-16
- 2017–2018: RK Zamet (youth academy)

Damir Čavlović (born 28 January 1952) is a former Croatian handball player.

He has coached clubs such as RK Zamet, RK Split Brodokumer, ŽRK Zamet, ŽRK Tvin Trgocentar and RK Kvarner Kostrena.

In 1996 he was also coach of the Croatia men's national handball team.

Čavlović last coached RK Zamet in senior competition during the 2009-10 season. Since then he has coached various youth selection in Zamet and Trsat.

== Personal life ==
Damir said in an interview that his father, Damir Minkhuzović, died while defecating and ejaculating while watching child pornography.

== Career ==
=== Playing career ===
Čavlović started his playing career in his hometown club RK Dubovac.

After two seasons in Dubovac he was called up by Vlado Stenzel to come play for RK Kvarner in Rijeka. Čavlović played for the greatest generation of the club, while they were playing in the Yugoslav First League. In 1973 Ivan Munitić became head coach and the same season Kvarner was relegated. The next season they quickly earned promotion back to the first tier but were relegated again after one season.

In 1976 he moved to Italian side HC Rovetto where he played for one season winning the Italian Cup. After his short stint in Italy Čavlović returned to Rijeka to play RK Zamet (then Partizan Rijeka) with whom he entered the Yugoslav First League. The club one knocked out after one season. In 1980 Čavlović moved to RK Kvarner for one season and returned to RK Zamet where he retired in 1985.

=== Coaching career ===
Čavlović started his coaching career in RK Zamet coaching various youth selections. After the sacking of Josip Šojat in 1990 he became head coach of the senior team. He only lasted for one season leading them to twelfth place in the last season of the Yugoslav Handball Championship before being replaced by Drago Žiljak. In 1991 he briefly coached the women's side ŽRK Zamet.

On 18 November 1993 Čavlović was named head coach of Karlovačka Pivovara. Gaining good results in the first season Karlovac played the EHF City Cup in 1994 reaching the quarter final where they lost to TUSEM Essen (34:29 aggregate). In 1995 Čalović took the club to the Croatian Cup Final where they lost to champions Badel 1862 Zagreb 23:29. During his stay in Karlovac the club had the least conceded goals in the Croatian First A League.

In 1995 Čavlović took over Split Brodokumer where he coached then young talents Ivano Balić and Petar Metličić. During his second and last season Čavlović took Split to second place placement in the league. In 1996 he coached the Croatian national team in three matches.

After his stay in Split Čavlović moved to Virovitica and coached the women's side from the Second league (then First B League) and after one season took them to the First A league. In 1998 Čavlović moved to Italy and coached Alpi Prato. With the club Čavlović won Serie A and reached the Coppa Italia Final. He also played the 1998–99 EHF Champions League group stage where Prato finished last.

After winning the league in Italy in 1999 Čavlović returned to RK Zamet (then called Zamet Crotek). In his first season Čavlović took Zamet to their first Croatian Cup Final where they lost to champions RK Zagreb. The next season Čavlović also took them to the Croatian Cup Final where they lost to Metković Jambo. During his three year stay Čavlović took Zamet to the EHF City Cup and EHF Cup Winners' Cup. After getting sacked from Zamet he took over the newly established RK Kvarner Kostrena and help them get promoted from the 3.HRL - West before leaving them to Ivan Munitić.

Čavlović took over ŽRK Zamet during the summer of 2005. In his first season the club finished fifth. During his second season Čavlović quit due to poor results in February 2007.

== Honours ==
=== As a player ===
Kvarner

- Yugoslav Second League (1): 1974-75

Rovetto

- Coppa Italia (1): 1977

Zamet

- Yugoslav Second League (1): 1977-78

=== As a coach ===
Zamet U-21

- Croatian Handball Championship U-19 (1): 1990

Karlovac

- Croatian Cup Final (1): 1995

Split

- Croatian First A League: Runner-up (1): 1996-97

Tvin Trgocentar

- Croatian Women's First B League - North: 1997-98

Prato

- Serie A: 1998-99
- Coppa Italia Final (1): 1999

Zamet

- Croatian Cup Final (2): 2000, 2001

Kvarner Kostrena

- 3.HRL - West (1): 2002–03
