= Božidar Peter =

Croatian handball player, coach and journalist

Božo Peter
Personal information
- Full name: Božidar Peter
- Nationality: Croatian
- Born: 3 March 1938 Zagreb, SFR Yugoslavia
- Died: 24 April 2012 (aged 74)

Sport
- Sport: Handball
- Position: Left back
- Current club: Retired

Senior clubs
- Years: Team
- 1955-1965: RK Partizan Bjelovar
- 1965-1966: RK Kvarner
- 1966-1967: RK Partizan Bjelovar
- 1967-1968: RK Kvarner
National team
Years	Team	Apps	(Gls)
1958-1961	Yugoslavia	12	(12)

Teams managed
- 1965-1966: RK Kvarner
- 1967-1970: RK Kvarner
- 1975-1978: RK Kvarner
- 1979-1980: RK Kvarner

Božidar Peter (3 March 1938 – 24 April 2012) was a former Croatian handball player, coach and journalist.

Peter was part of the first successful generation of Partizan Bjelovar. With the club he won the Yugoslav First League three time, the Yugoslav Cup once and got to the final of the European Champions Cup in 1962 where they lost to Frisch Auf Göppingen.

He played for the Yugoslav national team at 1958 World Championship in German Democratic Republic and 1961 World Championship in West Germany.

He moved to Rijeka where he finished his playing career and began coaching in RK Kvarner. He worked in Novi list as a journalist.

== Honours ==
Partizan Bjelovar

- Yugoslav First League
  - Winner (3): 1957-58, 1960-61, 1966-67
  - Runner-up (4): 1958-59, 1959-60, 1962-63, 1963-64,
- Yugoslav Cup
  - Winner (1): 1960
- European Champions Cup
  - Finalist (1): 1962

Kvarner

- Regional League of Primorje and Istra
  - Winner (2): 1967–68, 1968–69
  - Runner-up (1): 1965-66
- Croatian Unique League
  - Winner (1): 1969-70

Yugoslavia

- 1958 World Championship - 8th
- 1961 World Championship - 9th

Individual

- Best sportsperson in Bjelovar - 1957

== Sources ==
- Razvoj rukometa u Hrvatskoj - 1986
- Partizan Bjelovar - 1982
- 50 godina rukometa u Rijeci - 2005
- Slike rukometne bajke Bjelovara 2006
