= Petar Misovski =

Macedonian handball player

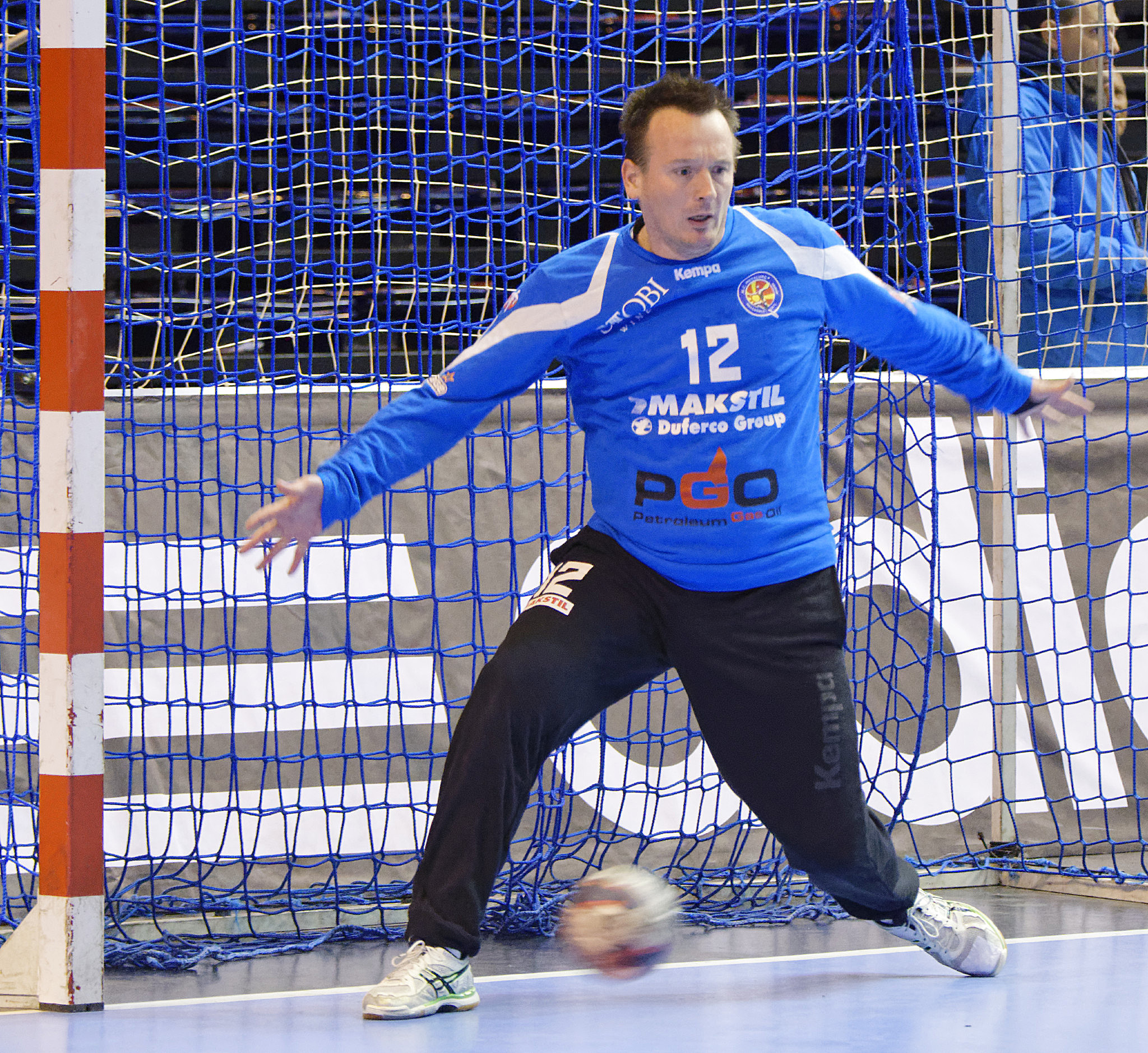

Personal information
- Nationality: Macedonian
- Born: 6 April 1976 (age 50) Skopje, SR Macedonia, SFR Yugoslavia
- Height: 1.88 m (6 ft 2 in)

Sport
- Sport: Handball
- Position: Goalkeeper
- Number: 1, 12, 16

Senior clubs
- Years: Team
- 1992–1995: (North Macedonia) RK Rabotnicki
- 1997–2000: (North Macedonia) Pelister
- 2000–2001: (Croatia) RK Rudar
- 2001–2002: (Croatia) Zamet Crotek
- 2002–2004: (North Macedonia) Vardar Vatrostalna
- 2004–2005: (Denmark) Silkeborg
- 2005-2006: (Norway) NIT-HAK Nittedal
- 2006–2007: (Sweden) Treleborg
- 2007–2009: (Slovenia) Merkur
- 2009–2010: (North Macedonia) RK Metalurg Skopje
- 2010–2011: (North Macedonia) Tinex Prolet
- 2011–2012: (North Macedonia) RK Pelister
- 2012–2013: (Turkey) Yeditepe
- 2013–2014: (Turkey) Anafen Koleji SC
- 2014–2015: (North Macedonia) RK Metalurg Skopje
National team
- Years: Team
- 1999–2008: (North Macedonia) Macedonia

Teams managed
- 2015–2020: (North Macedonia) RK Metalurg Skopje (GK coach)
- 2021–2024: Qatar youth (GK coach)
- 2025–: (Qatar) Al Duhail (GK coach)
- Updated on 1995–2026

Petar Misovski (Macedonian: Петар Mисовски) (born 4 Junel 1976) is a retired Macedonian handball player who has played for RK Pelister, Zamet Rijeka, RK Vardar, Nittedal, Merkur, Metalurg and Tinex Prolet. He has also played for Macedonia national handball team.

After he retired, he started a coaching job specializing in training Goalkeepers. Currently he is continuing his Goalkeeper Coaching career in Qatar, where he works for Al Duhail SC.

== Honours ==
Pelister

- Macedonian Super League (2): 1997-98, 1999-00
- Macedonian Cup (2): 1998, 1999

Vardar

- Macedonian Super League (2): 2002-03, 2003–04
- Macedonian Cup (2): 2003, 2004

Metalurg

- Macedonian Super League (1): 2009-10
- Macedonian Cup (1): 2010
