= Antonio Pribanić =

Croatian handball player (born 1987)

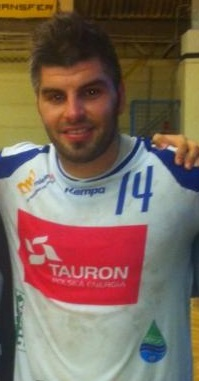

Personal information
- Full name: Antonio Pribanić
- Nationality: Croatian
- Born: 13 December 1987 (age 38) Rijeka, Croatia
- Height: 1.85 m (6 ft 1 in)

Sport
- Sport: Handball
- Position: Line Player
- Current club: RK Umag
- Number: 14

Senior clubs
- Years: Team
- 2003–2008: RK Kvarner
- 2003–2004: → RK Senj
- 2007–2008: → RK Umag
- 2008–2011: RK Bjelovar
- 2011–2013: SC Pick Szeged
- 2013–2014: Stal Mielec
- 2014–2016: HCM Minaur Baia Mare
- 2016–2017: KPR Legionowo
- 2018–2019: SCM Politehnica Timișoara
- 2020: Pfadi Winterthur
- 2020–2021: RK Poreč
- 2021–2023: Stal Mielec
- 2023–2024: SCM Politehnica Timișoara
- 2024–2025: BT Füchse
- 2025-: RK Umag

Antonio Pribanić (born 13 December 1987 in Rijeka) is a Croatian handballer who plays for RK Umag.

== Career ==
He started playing handball in his hometown club RK Kvarner. After loans to RK Senj and RK Umag he moved to RK Bjelovar.

In 2015 he won the league and cup titles of Romania with Baia Mare.

== Achievements ==
RK Umag

- Croatian Second League – West:
  - Winner: 2008

RK Bjelovar

- Croatian Premier League:
  - Bronze Medalist: 2011

SC Pick Szeged

- Hungarian League:
  - Silver Medalist: 2012, 2013
- Hungarian Cup:
  - Finalist: 2012, 2013

HCM Minaur Baia Mare

- Romanian National League:
  - Winner: 2015
- Romanian Cup:
  - Winner: 2015

Individual

- Polish Superliga best line player: 2013–14
