= RK Željezničar =

Bosnian handball club

- Full name: Rukometni Klub Željezničar Sarajevo
- Founded: 1954
- Arena: Grbavica Hall, Sarajevo
- Capacity: 1,500
- League: Prva liga FBiH South
- Club colours

Rukometni klub Željezničar is a handball club from Sarajevo, Bosnia and Herzegovina.

== Accomplishments ==
- Yugoslav Handball Championship
  - Winners: 1978
- IHF Cup
  - Runners-up: 1982
