= Roberto Sošić =

Croatian handball player

Personal information
- Nationality: Croatian
- Born: Rovinj, SR Croatia, SFR Yugoslavia

Sport
- Sport: Handball

Senior clubs
- Years: Team
- –: RK Zamet
National team
- Years: Team
- –: Yugoslavia

Roberto Sošić is a Croatian former handball player.

Sošić was born in Rovinj, Istria (now Croatia, at the time Yugoslavia). He joined RK Zamet, based in Rijeka, in the early part of his career.

Sošić played for many years in RK Zamet, and he's considered one of the most important players in the club's history, being, together with Jurica Lakić, Alvaro Načinović, Vlado Vukoje, and Mateo Hrvatin one of Zamet's only five players who managed to play for Yugoslavia's national team.
