= 1990–91 Yugoslav Handball Championship =

Yugoslav Handball Championship
- Season: 1990–91
- Champions: Zagreb Chromos
- European Champions Cup: Zagreb Chromos
- EHF Cup Winners' Cup: Red Star Belgrade
- IHF Cup: Proleter Zrenjanin
- Top goalscorer: Patrik Ćavar

The 1990–91 Yugoslav Handball Championship was the 39th and last season of the championship due to the break up of Yugoslavia.

== First League ==
=== First Phase ===
	Club	P	W	D	L	G+	G−	Pts
1.	Zagreb Chromos	30	22	2	6	777	660	46
2.	Proleter Naftagas Zrenjanin	30	22	0	8	685	607	44
3.	Red Star Belgrade	30	22	0	8	735	673	44
4.	Metaloplastika Šabac	30	21	2	7	722	641	44
5.	Borac Banja Luka	30	17	1	12	666	639	35
6.	Jugović Kać	30	17	0	13	720	679	34
7.	Crvenka	30	16	0	14	697	710	32
8.	Pelister	30	14	2	14	662	670	30
9.	Medveščak Zagreb	30	14	2	14	717	724	30
10.	Sloga Doboj	30	14	2	14	652	670	30
11.	Železničar Niš	30	11	1	18	686	722	23
12.	Zamet Rijeka	30	11	1	18	640	690	23
13.	Istraturist Umag	30	10	0	20	606	549	20
14.	Vrbas	30	8	4	18	672	720	16
15.	Lovćen Cetinje	30	8	0	22	610	705	16
16.	Budućnost Titograd	30	5	2	23	660	748	12

en.wiki, RK Lovćen in the First League
Proleter Zrenjanin

=== Championship play-offs ===
- Winner: Zagreb Chromos

Club1	Win-Loss	Club2	Score
Semi-final
Zagreb		Metalopastika	
Proleter Naftagas	2-1	Red Star Belgrade	?.?*, ?.?, 19:16*
Final
Zagreb	2-1	Proleter Naftagas	25:20*, 20:23, 22:18*
* home match for club1

Proleter Zrenjanin

== Second league ==
=== West ===
	Club	P	W	D	L	G+	G−	Pts
1.	Celje Pivovarna Laško	26	21	1	4	695	545	43
2.	Partizan Bjelovar	26	19	0	7	664	593	38
3.	ŠRK Velenje	26	18	0	8	700	641	36
4.	Kolinska Slovan Ljubljana	26	17	0	9	578	505	34
5.	Slovanjgradec	26	13	1	12	616	567	27
6.	Moslavina Kutina	26	12	1	13	574	585	25
7.	Mehanika Metković	26	12	0	14	565	566	24
8.	Split	26	12	0	14	588	632	24
9.	Borac Zagreb	26	11	0	15	536	542	22
10.	IUV Usnjar Litija	26	9	0	17	592	628	18
11.	Jugoturbina Karlovac	26	9	0	17	556	625	18
12.	Metalac Sisak	26	7	3	16	568	621	17
13.	Đakovo	26	8	0	18	526	571	16
14.	Ajdovščina	26	8	0	18	472	638	16

40 godina rukometa u Metkoviću : 1963.-2003.

== Third league ==
=== SR Croatia ===
==== Croatian League – East ====
	Club	P	W	D	L	G+/G-	Pts
1.	Elektra Osijek	16	12	0	4	428:331	24
2.	Opuzen PPK ZG	16	9	1	6	352:343	19
3.	Trogir Medena	16	9	0	7	336:340	18
4.	Požega	16	7	3	6	326:321	17
5.	Slavonija DI Slavonski Brod	16	7	1	8	407:398	15
6.	Zanatlija Županja	16	7	0	9	379:370	14
7.	Metalac OLT Osijek	16	7	0	9	381:386	13 (-1)
8.	Strmac Nova Gradiška	16	4	0	12	298:343	8
9.	Jugovinil Kaštel Gomilica	16	4	1	11	335:400	8 (-1)

RK Kaštela Adriachem – 50 godina rukometa u Kaštel Gomilici

== Fourth and lower tiers ==
=== SR Croatia ===
==== Dalmatia league ====
Fourth tier of the competition

	Club	P	W	D	L	G+	G−	Pts
1.	Solin	14	10	0	4	362	310	20
2.	Korčula	14	9	1	4	357	291	19
3.	Merces Makarska	14	7	0	7	309	282	14
4.	Jelsa	14	7	0	7	308	320	14
5.	Orkan Dugi Rat	14	6	1	7	337	325	13
6.	Dubrovnik	14	6	1	7	263	298	13
7.	Cetinka Trilj	14	5	2	7	297	292	12
8.	Željezara Kaštel Sućurac	14	3	1	10	276	345	7

RK Solin – 50 godina rukometa u Solinu
RK Hrvatski Dragovoljac Dugi Rat

== See also ==
- Handball Championship of Bosnia and Herzegovina
- (Croatia) Croatian Premier Handball League
- (North Macedonia) Macedonian Handball Super League
- (Montenegro) Montenegrin First League of Men's Handball
- Handball League of Serbia
- (Slovenia) Slovenian First League of Handball

== Sources ==
- Ivan Jurić: 40 godina rukometa u Metkoviću : 1963.-2003., Metković, 2003.
- Jurica Gizdić:RK Kaštela Adriachem – 50 godina rukometa u Kaštel Gomilici, Kaštel Gomilica, 2008.
- en.wiki, RK Lovćen in the First League
- RK Hrvatski Dragovoljac Dugi Rat – Dalmatinska liga 1990./91., rezultati kluba, pristupljeno 9. srpnja 2016.
