= Kusanović =

Kusanović (pronounced [kusǎːnoʋitɕ]) is a South Slavic surname found among the Croats.

Notable people with the surname include:

- Liliana Kusanović (born 1955), Chilean businesswoman, engineer, and politician
- Alejandro Kusanovic (born 1960), Chilean engineer and politician
- Tino Kusanović (born 2008), Croatian footballer, played at the 2025 FIFA U-17 World Cup

== See also ==
- Kosanović
