= GF World Cup '11 =

International women's handball competition

The GF World Cup '11 is the seventh edition and last of the GF World Cup, which was held in Aarhus, Denmark between 20 and 25 September. Romania entered the tournament as defending champions following their triumph in 2010 against Norway, but were eliminated during the group stage. Norway reached the final again, for the fourth time in row, but fall short in close fight against Russia, which came back from four goals down to win the match 25–23.

The following year the GF World Cup was disestablished.

== Competition ==
=== Group A ===
Team	Pld	W	D	L	GF	GA	GD	Pts
Norway	3	2	0	1	85	68	+17	4
France	3	2	0	1	84	78	+6	4
Germany	3	2	0	1	70	74	−4	4
Romania	3	0	0	3	75	94	−19	0

All times are Central European Summer Time (UTC+2)

September 20, 2011; 14:00	France	30 – 25	Romania	NRGi Arena, Aarhus; Attendance: 250; Referees: Gubica, Milosevic (Croatia)
September 20, 2011; 14:00	Lacrabère 6	(12–9)	Curea 6	NRGi Arena, Aarhus; Attendance: 250; Referees: Gubica, Milosevic (Croatia)
September 20, 2011; 14:00	3× (yellow card) 2× (suspension)	Report	3× (yellow card)	NRGi Arena, Aarhus; Attendance: 250; Referees: Gubica, Milosevic (Croatia)

September 20, 2011; 18:00	Norway	25 – 13	Germany	NRGi Arena, Aarhus; Attendance: 625; Referees: Lythje, Christiansen (Denmark)
September 20, 2011; 18:00	Lunde-Borgersen 5	(14–7)	three players 3	NRGi Arena, Aarhus; Attendance: 625; Referees: Lythje, Christiansen (Denmark)
September 20, 2011; 18:00	2× (yellow card) 2× (suspension)	Report	3× (yellow card) 4× (suspension)	NRGi Arena, Aarhus; Attendance: 625; Referees: Lythje, Christiansen (Denmark)

September 21, 2011; 14:00	Germany	31 – 29	Romania	NRGi Arena, Aarhus; Referees: Mazeika, Mindaugas (Lithuania)
September 21, 2011; 14:00	Steinbach, Wolhbold 6	(14–12)	Şoit 8	NRGi Arena, Aarhus; Referees: Mazeika, Mindaugas (Lithuania)
September 21, 2011; 14:00	2× (yellow card) 5× (suspension)	Report	3× (yellow card) 4× (suspension)	NRGi Arena, Aarhus; Referees: Mazeika, Mindaugas (Lithuania)

September 21, 2011; 18:00	France	34 – 27	Norway	NRGi Arena, Aarhus; Referees: Hansen, Gjeding (Denmark)
September 21, 2011; 18:00	Baudouin 7	(20–14)	Riegelhuth 7	NRGi Arena, Aarhus; Referees: Hansen, Gjeding (Denmark)
September 21, 2011; 18:00	1× (yellow card) 2× (suspension)	Report	3× (yellow card) 2× (suspension)	NRGi Arena, Aarhus; Referees: Hansen, Gjeding (Denmark)

September 22, 2011; 14:00	France	20 – 26	Germany	NRGi Arena, Aarhus; Referees: Gubica, Milosevic (Croatia)
September 22, 2011; 14:00	Baudouin 5	(9–18)	Richter 8	NRGi Arena, Aarhus; Referees: Gubica, Milosevic (Croatia)
September 22, 2011; 14:00	2× (yellow card)	Report	2× (yellow card) 3× (suspension)	NRGi Arena, Aarhus; Referees: Gubica, Milosevic (Croatia)

September 22, 2011; 18:00	Norway	33 – 21	Romania	NRGi Arena, Aarhus; Referees: Lythje, Christiansen (Denmark)
September 22, 2011; 18:00	Sulland 8	(15–9)	Curea 8	NRGi Arena, Aarhus; Referees: Lythje, Christiansen (Denmark)
September 22, 2011; 18:00	3× (yellow card) 6× (suspension)	Report	2× (yellow card) 2× (suspension)	NRGi Arena, Aarhus; Referees: Lythje, Christiansen (Denmark)

=== Group B ===
Team	Pld	W	D	L	GF	GA	GD	Pts
Russia	3	3	0	0	86	67	+19	6
Spain	3	1	0	2	67	75	−8	2
Sweden	3	1	0	2	65	71	−6	2
Denmark	3	1	0	2	76	81	−5	2

All times are Central European Summer Time (UTC+2)

September 20, 2011; 16:00	Spain	19 – 24	Sweden	NRGi Arena, Aarhus; Attendance: 300; Referees: Hansen, Gjeding (Denmark)
September 20, 2011; 16:00	Mangué 5	(8–14)	Fredén, Alm 4	NRGi Arena, Aarhus; Attendance: 300; Referees: Hansen, Gjeding (Denmark)
September 20, 2011; 16:00	2× (yellow card) 1× (suspension)	Report	1× (yellow card) 2× (suspension)	NRGi Arena, Aarhus; Attendance: 300; Referees: Hansen, Gjeding (Denmark)

September 20, 2011; 20:00	Denmark	28 – 31	Russia	NRGi Arena, Aarhus; Attendance: 2004; Referees: Mazeika, Mindaugas (Lithuania)
September 20, 2011; 20:00	Dalby 7	(14–13)	Davydenko 8	NRGi Arena, Aarhus; Attendance: 2004; Referees: Mazeika, Mindaugas (Lithuania)
September 20, 2011; 20:00	3× (yellow card) 3× (suspension)	Report	2× (yellow card) 3× (suspension)	NRGi Arena, Aarhus; Attendance: 2004; Referees: Mazeika, Mindaugas (Lithuania)

September 21, 2011; 16:00	Russia	28 – 21	Sweden	NRGi Arena, Aarhus; Attendance: 886; Referees: Lythje, Christiansen (Denmark)
September 21, 2011; 16:00	Postnova, Turey 5	(14–12)	Fredén 6	NRGi Arena, Aarhus; Attendance: 886; Referees: Lythje, Christiansen (Denmark)
September 21, 2011; 16:00	2× (yellow card) 5× (suspension)	Report	3× (yellow card) 2× (suspension)	NRGi Arena, Aarhus; Attendance: 886; Referees: Lythje, Christiansen (Denmark)

September 21, 2011; 20:00	Denmark	24 – 30	Spain	NRGi Arena, Aarhus; Referees: Gubica, Milosevic (Croatia)
September 21, 2011; 20:00	Thorsgaard 6	(9–17)	Aguilar 7	NRGi Arena, Aarhus; Referees: Gubica, Milosevic (Croatia)
September 21, 2011; 20:00	2× (yellow card) 1× (suspension)	Report	2× (yellow card) 5× (suspension)	NRGi Arena, Aarhus; Referees: Gubica, Milosevic (Croatia)

September 22, 2011; 16:00	Spain	18 – 27	Russia	NRGi Arena, Aarhus; Referees: Gram, Mortensen (Denmark)
September 22, 2011; 16:00	Alonso 4	(9–16)	Chernoivanenko 6	NRGi Arena, Aarhus; Referees: Gram, Mortensen (Denmark)
September 22, 2011; 16:00	2× (yellow card) 4× (suspension)	Report	3× (yellow card) 8× (suspension)	NRGi Arena, Aarhus; Referees: Gram, Mortensen (Denmark)

September 22, 2011; 20:00	Denmark	24 – 20	Sweden	NRGi Arena, Aarhus; Attendance: 2712; Referees: Mazeika, Mindaugas (Lithuania)
September 22, 2011; 20:00	Skov 7	(13–9)	Alm 7	NRGi Arena, Aarhus; Attendance: 2712; Referees: Mazeika, Mindaugas (Lithuania)
September 22, 2011; 20:00	3× (yellow card) 4× (suspension)	Report	3× (yellow card) 2× (suspension)	NRGi Arena, Aarhus; Attendance: 2712; Referees: Mazeika, Mindaugas (Lithuania)

=== Knockout stage ===
==== Semifinals ====
September 24, 2011; 14:15	France	26 – 27	Russia	NRGi Arena, Aarhus

September 24, 2011; 16:15	Norway	25 – 23	Spain	NRGi Arena, Aarhus

==== Bronze medal match ====
September 25, 2011; 15:30	France	16 – 15	Spain	NRGi Arena, Aarhus

==== Final ====
September 25, 2011; 17:30	Norway	23 – 25	Russia	NRGi Arena, Aarhus

== Ranking and awards ==
=== Final standing ===
1st place, gold medalist(s)	Russia
2nd place, silver medalist(s)	Norway
3rd place, bronze medalist(s)	France
4	Spain
5–8	Denmark
5–8	Germany
5–8	Romania
5–8	Sweden

=== All Star Team ===
- Goalkeeper: Maria Sidorova (RUS)
- Left wing: Siraba Dembélé (FRA)
- Left back: Macarena Aguilar (ESP)
- Pivot: Marit Malm Frafjord (NOR)
- Centre back: Allison Pineau (FRA)
- Right back: Ekaterina Davydenko (RUS)
- Right wing: Linn-Kristin Riegelhuth (NOR)
- Most Valuable Player: Allison Pineau (FRA)

Source: Danish Handball Federation
