= Boris Komucki =

Croatian handball player and coach (born 1956)

Boris Komuczki
Personal information
- Full name: Boris Komucki
- Nationality: Croatian
- Born: 28 December 1956 (age 69) Rijeka, SFR Yugoslavia

Sport
- Sport: Handball
- Number: 13

Youth career
- Years: Team
- 1969–1973: RK Kvarner

Senior clubs
- Years: Team
- 1973–1979: RK Kvarner
- 1979–1981: RK Zamet
- 1981–1982: RK Crvena Zvezda
- 1982–1983: RK Borac Banja Luka
- 1983–1985: RK Zamet
- 1985–1986: HC Firenze
- 1986–1987: Pallamano Conversano
- 1987-1988: Guadalajara
- 1988–1989: Bayer 04 Leverkusen
- 1989–1991: TuS Nettelstedt-Lübbecke
- 1991–1993: TSV Grün-Weiß Dankersen
National team
- Years: Team
- 1975–1976: SR Croatia U-20
- 1979–1980: Yugoslavia U-23

Teams managed
- 2015: HSG Bergische Panther (W)
- 2015-present: HSG Bergische Panther (M)

Boris Komuczki (born 28 December 1956) is a former Croatian handball player and coach.

== Playing career ==
Komucki started playing handball at a young age in primary school in Trsat. He soon moved to RK Kvarner where he started his handball career.

He was supposed to play for the Yugoslav national team at the 1978 World Championship but couldn't due to mandatory military service.

In 1979 after being stripped the captain's arm band he moved to city rivals RK Zamet. With Zamet Komucki demolished his former club, won the city rivalry to the extent that Kvarner admitted defeat in writing.

In 1981 Komucki spent a season in Belgrade playing for RK Crvena Zvezda and a season in Banja Luka with Borac.

Komucki had one more spell at RK Zamet where they almost entered the Yugoslav First League being one point short from Jugović Kać.

In 1985 he went to Italy to play for HC Firenze and Pallamano Conversano. In 1988 he moved to Germany and to play for Bayer 04 Leverkusen with whom he reached the semi-final of the DHB-Pokal. Komucki also played for TuS Nettelstedt-Lübbecke and TSV Grün-Weiß Dankersen.

== Honours ==
As player
Kvarner

- Yugoslav Second League (1): 1974–75
- Croatian U-19 Championship (1): 1975
- Croatian U-23 Championship (1): 1979

Zamet

- Yugoslav Second League Runner-up (1): 1983–84

Individual

- Best handball player in Rijeka - 1984

== Sources ==
- Petar Orgulić - 50 godina rukometa u Rijeci (2005), Adria public
