= Yeditepe =

Yeditepe may refer to:

- Bezge, formerly Yeditepe, a neighbourhood of the municipality and district of Yayladağı, Hatay Province, Turkey
- Yeditepe (magazine), a literary magazine published in Istanbul, Turkey
- Yeditepe University, a private foundation university in Istanbul, Turkey
