= Simeon Kosanović =

Croatian basketball and handball player (born 1933)

Personal information
- Nationality: Croatian
- Born: 26 August 1933 (age 93) Jasenak, Kingdom of Yugoslavia

Sport
- Sport: Handball

Senior clubs
- Years: Team
- 1954-1960: RK Primorje
- 1960-1963: RK Exportdrvo
- 1963-1964: RK Kvarner
- 1964-1969: RK Partizan Zamet

Teams managed
- 1966-1969: RK Partizan Zamet
- 1969-1974: ŽRK Partizan Zamet
- 1974-1975: RK Senj
- 1976-1978: RK Jadran Kozina

Simeon Kosanović (born 26 August 1933) is a Croatian former basketball and handball player. He is the brother of Željko Kosanović.

== Honours ==
=== As player ===
Primorje

- Croatian Primorje League - Rijeka group (1): 1957-58
- Primorje and Istra Regional League (2): 1958-59, 1959-60

Kvarner

- Regional League of Rijeka and Karlovac (1): 1963-64

Partizan Zamet

- Regional League of Primorje and Karlovac (1): 1965-66

=== As coach ===
ŽRK Partizan Zamet

- Regional league of Primorje and Istra (1): 1969-70

== Sources ==
- Petar Orgulić - 50 godina rukometa u Rijeci (2005), Adria public
