= Ivan Munitić =

Croatian handball player and coach (born 1942)

Personal information
- Full name: Ivan Dundo Munitić
- Nationality: Croatian
- Born: 7 April 1942 (age 84) Dubrovnik, Kingdom of Yugoslavia

Sport
- Sport: Handball
- Position: Goalkeeper
- Current club: Retired
- Number: 1

Youth career
- Years: Team
- 1957-1959: RK Partizan Zamet

Senior clubs
- Years: Team
- 1959-1963: RK Partizan Zamet
- 1963-1964: RK Kvarner Rijeka
- 1964-1966: RK Partizan Zamet
- 1966-1970: RK Kvarner Rijeka

Teams managed
- 1969-1970: RK Kvarner Rijeka (Ass.)
- 1973-1975: RK Kvarner Rijeka
- 1975-1977: Slovan Ljubljana
- 1977-1978: HC Borussia Dortmund
- 1978: RK Kvarner Rijeka II
- 1978-1979: RK Kvarner Rijeka
- 1979: RK Kvarner Rijeka U-21
- 1979-1983: Kolinska Slovan
- 1983-1984: Pelister Bitolj
- 1984-1985: RK Iskra Bugojno
- 1994-1995: RK Zamet
- 1996-1997: RKHM Dubrovnik
- 1997-1999: RK Zamet Autotrans
- 2003-2005: RK Kvarner Kostrena
- 2007-2008: RK Kvarner Kostrena
- 2008-2011: Crikvenica
- 2011-2012: RK Kvarner Kostrena

Ivan Munitić (born 7 April 1942) is a former Croatian handball player and handball coach.

== Playing career ==
Munitić started playing handball in RK Partizan Zamet. In 1963 he transferred to newly established Kvarner Rijeka and was part of their first ever squad. He later returned to Zamet but opted to end his playing career in Kvarner.

== Coaching career ==
During his last playing season he was also the assistant coach of the team alongside head coach Božo Peter. He was also in the coaching staff for Vlado Stenzel from 1970 to 1973 while finishing his coaching degree.

In 1973 he became the head coach of RK Kvarner and he coached his side into the Yugoslav First League. After leaving Kvarner Munitić also coached Kolinska Slovan for two seasons and entered the Yugoslav First League. He also coached HC Borussia Dortmund, RK Pelister, RK Iskra Bugojno during the 1970s and 1980s.

His biggest achievement was winning the Yugoslav First League and reaching the finals of the European Champions Cup with Kolinski Slovan. His biggest upset as head coach was then he coached Zamet in 1994-95 season. Zamet was relegated to the second tier for the first time since the start of the Croatian First A League. During the 1996-97 season he coached RKHM Dubrovnik in the *First B League where the club was placed in eight place at the end of the season. Although the league results weren't that good Munitić led the club to the quarter-final of the Croatian where they were knocked out by Medvečak. To this day it's the club's biggest achievement.

After his stint in Dubrovnik he was called to coach Zamet once again. During his first season he secured third place with the club and qualified for the EHF City Cup. The next season the club yet again finished in third place. Munitić got sacked on October 10, 1999 after being knocked out of the EHF Cup Winners' Cup by Pfadi Winterthur during the first round.

His last coaching arrangement was at Kvarner Kostrena before the club's senior team was discontinued due to lack of funds.

== Personal life ==
Munitić currently resides in Krk.

== Honours ==
As a player
Zamet

- Regional League of Primorje and Karlovac (1): 1965-66

Kvarner

- Croatian Unique League (1): 1969-70
- Regional League of Primorje and Istra (3): 1966-67, 1967–68, 1968–69

As a coach
Kvarner

- Yugoslav Second League - West (1): 1974-75
- Croatian U-21 Championship (1): 1979

Slovan

- European Champions Cup Finalist (1): 1980-81
- Yugoslav First League (1): 1979-80
- Yugoslav Second League - North (1): 1976-77
