= Silvio Ivandija =

Croatian handball player and coach (born 1964)

Personal information
- Nationality: Croatian
- Born: 20 September 1964 (age 62) Osijek, SR Croatia, SFR Yugoslavia

Sport
- Sport: Handball
- Position: Right back
- Current club: MRK Sesvete (manager)

Senior clubs
- Years: Team
- 1982–1988: Elektra Osijek
- 1988–1991: Aero Celje
- 1991–1993: Trieste
- 1993–1996: Pivovarna Laško Celje
- 1996–1998: Badel 1862 Zagreb
- 1998–2000: Zamet Autotrans
- 2000–2001: Badel 1862 Zagreb
- 2001–2002: Alpi Pallamano Prato
National team
Years	Team	Apps
1993–1999	Croatia	21

Teams managed
- 2002: RK Dubrava
- 2003: RK Zagreb
- 2003: ŽRK Trešnjevka Zagreb
- 2003–2004: Pallamano Trieste
- 2004–2006: CO Zagreb (assistant)
- 2006–2008: RK Karlovac
- 2008–2009: RK Medveščak
- 2009–2011: HRK Izviđač Ljubuški
- 2011: RK Međugorje
- 2012: RK Osijek
- 2012–2014: Qatar
- 2014–2015: GRK Varaždin 1930
- 2015–2016: ŽRK Lokomotiva Zagreb
- 2016: Croatia U-21 (W)
- 2016–2017: RK Zagreb
- 2017–2018: HRK Izviđač Ljubuški
- 2018–2019: RKHM Dubrovnik
- 2019-: MRK Sesvete
Medal record
Men's handball
Representing Croatia
Mediterranean Games
Gold medal – first place	1997 Bari	Team

Silvio Ivandija (born 20 September 1964) is a Croatian former handball player and current handball coach for MRK Sesvete.

== Honours ==
=== As a player ===
Osijek

- Regional league of Slavonia – North (1): 1983-84

Celje

- Yugoslav Second League (1): 1990–91
- 1. NLB (3): 1993–94, 1994–95, 1995–96
- Slovenian Cup (3): 1994, 1995, 1996

Pallamano Trieste

- Serie A (1): 1992–93
- Coppa Italia (1): 1993

Zagreb

- Croatian First A League (3): 1996–97, 1997–98, 2000–01
- Croatian Cup (3): 1997, 1998, 2001

=== As a coach ===
Zagreb

- Croatian Cup (1): 2003

Izviđač

- Handball Championship of Bosnia and Herzegovina (1): 2017–18
