= Ivan Vukas =

Croatian handball player (born 1979)

Personal information
- Nationality: Croatian
- Born: 16 September 1979 (age 47) Sinj, SFR Yugoslavia
- Height: 196 cm (77 in)

Sport
- Sport: Handball
- Position: Right back
- Number: 11

Senior clubs
- Years: Team
- 1997-2001: Zamet Autotrans
- 2001-2004: Metković Jambo
- 2004-2006: GWD Minden
- 2006-2009: CB Torrevieja
- 2009-2011: Moser Medical UHK Krems
- 2011-2013: European University Cyprus
National team
Years	Team	Apps
2001-2006	Croatia	32
Medal record
Representing Croatia
Statoil World Cup
Gold medal – first place	2006 Sweden & Germany	Team

Ivan Vukas (born 16 September 1979) is a former Croatian handball national team player.

Vukas started his career in RK Zamet then named Zamet Autotrans and then later Crotek. In 2001 he moved to RK Metković.

He played for the national team at the 2004 European Men's Handball Championship where Croatia finished in fourth place. He also played at the 2006 Statoil World Cup where Croatia won the tournament.

== Honours ==
Zamet

- Croatian Cup
  - Finalist (2): 2000, 2001

Metković

- Croatian First League
  - Runner-up (3): 2001–02, 2002–03, 2003–04
- Croatian Cup
  - Winner (1): 2002
  - Finalist (1): 2004

Moser

- Austrian Cup
  - Winner (1): 2010
