= Dean Ožbolt =

Croatian handball player (1967–2003)

Personal information
- Full name: Dean Ožbolt
- Nationality: Croatian
- Born: 13 December 1967 Rijeka, SR Croatia, SFR Yugoslavia
- Died: 28 May 2003 (aged 35) Novska, Croatia

Sport
- Sport: Handball
- Position: Right wing
- Current club: Zamet
- Number: 7

Youth career
- Years: Team
- 1980-1984: RK Kozala

Senior clubs
- Years: Team
- 1984-1985: RK Kozala
- 1985-2000: RK Zamet
National team
Years	Team	Apps
1991-1992	Croatia	9
Medal record
Representing Croatia
USA Cup
Men's Handball
Gold medal – first place	1991 America	Team

Dean Ožbolt (December 13, 1967 – May 28, 2003) was a Croatian handball player.

== Career ==
Before discovering handball Ožbolt played water polo in his youth. His first coach was Romano Rubinić with whom he won the Croatian Handball Championship U-16 in 1983.

After playing for one season for Kozala, Ožbolt was invited to play for RK Zamet for which he played for 15 years. In Zamet, Ožbolt helped the club reach the Yugoslav First League in 1987, and reach second place in Croatian First A League which also gave Zamet their first match in a European competition and reach their first final in the Croatian Cup.

He also captained his side from 1992 to 1996.

In 1991 he got called up to play for Croatia to play at a tournament in the United States where Croatia won first place. He also played at a tournament in Sardinia in 1992 where he was named player of the tournament.

== Personal life ==
During his playing career he earned his coaching degree in Pula. On May 28, 2003, Ožbolt died in a car accident on the highway near Novska.

== Honours ==
Zamet

- Yugoslav Second League (1): 1986-87
- Croatian First B League (1): 1995-96
