= Željko Kosanović =

Croatian basketball and handball player (born 1934)

Personal information
- Nationality: Croatian
- Born: 19 August 1934 (age 92) Jasenak, Kingdom of Yugoslavia

Sport
- Sport: Handball
- Position: Right back

Youth career
- Years: Team
- 1946-1948: KK Lokomotiva

Senior clubs
- Years: Team
- 1948-1954: KK Lokomotiva
- 1954-1962: RK Primorje
- 1963-1965: RK Kvarner
- 1965-1969: RK Partizan Zamet

Željko Kosanović (born 19 August 1934) is a former Croatian basketball and handball player.

He is the brother of Simeon Kosanović.

== Honours ==
Lokomotiva

- Croatian Republic League (1): 1952

Primorje

- Croatian Primorje League - Rijeka group (1): 1957-58
- Primorje and Istra Regional League (2): 1958-59, 1959-60

Kvarner

- Regional League of Rijeka and Karlovac (1): 1963-64
- Regional League of Croatia (primorje) (1): 1964-65

Partizan Zamet

- Regional League of Primorje and Karlovac (1): 1965-66

== Sources ==
- Petar Orgulić - 50 godina rukometa u Rijeci (2005), Adria public
