= GF World Cup =

Women's handball competition

The GF World Cup was an annual women's friendly handball tournament organised by the Danish Handball Federation and sponsored by insurance company GF Forsikring. Eight invited teams competed at the event, including permanent representatives Sweden and Denmark.

The first GF World Cup took place in November 2005 in NRGi Arena, Aarhus. The tournament ended in 2011 and was replaced by the Golden League.

Russia was the last champion of the tournament and it is also the most successful team in the history of the cup with three titles.

== Editions ==
Year	Host country	Gold medal game			Bronze medal game
Year	Host country	Gold	Score	Silver	Bronze	Score	Fourth place
2005; Details	Denmark	Norway	30 – 27	South Korea	Russia	31 – 29	Romania
2006; Details	Denmark	Russia	29 – 28	Romania	Denmark	24 – 20	Ukraine
2007; Details	Denmark	Russia	30 – 24	France	Norway	30 – 28	Denmark
2008; Details	Denmark	Norway	30 – 18	Denmark	France	29 – 23	Germany
2009; Details	Denmark	Romania	28 – 27	Norway	Germany	36 – 34	Denmark
2010; Details	Denmark	Romania	24 – 23	Norway	France	28 – 26	Denmark
2011; Details	Denmark	Russia	25 – 23	Norway	France	16 – 15	Spain

== Overall medal count ==
Rank	Nation	Gold	Silver	Bronze	Total
1	Russia	3	0	1	4
2	Norway	2	3	1	6
3	Romania	2	1	0	3
4	France	0	1	3	4
5	Denmark	0	1	1	2
6	South Korea	0	1	0	1
7	Germany	0	0	1	1
Totals (7 entries)		7	7	7	21

== See also ==
- Posten Cup
- Golden League
