= Vlado Vukoje =

Croatian handball player and coach (born 1952)

Personal information
- Full name: Vladimir Vukoje
- Nationality: Yugoslavia / Croatia
- Born: 21 July 1952 (age 74) Sečanj, SFR Yugoslavia
- Height: 1.91 m (6 ft 3 in)

Sport
- Sport: Handball
- Number: 1

Senior clubs
- Years: Team
- 1970-1974: RK Sečanj
- 1974-1976: RK Kvarner Rijeka
- 1976-1983: RK Aero-Celje
- 1983-1984: RK Zamet Rijeka
- 1984-1985: Reinickendorfer Füchse
- 1985-1988: TSV Bayer Dormagen
- 1988-1989: Wermelskirchener TV
- 1989-1993: TuRU Düsseldorf
National team
Years	Team	Apps
1977	Yugoslavia	1

Teams managed
- –: Handballkreis Mitterlrhein
- –: HC Dünnwalder Turnverein 1905 e.V
- –: HSG Bergische Panther
- –: TuS Erkrath 1930 e.V

Vladimir Vukoje (born 21 July 1952) is a former Serbian handball player and handball coach.

== Honours ==
Kvarner

- Yugoslav Second League
  - Winner (1): 1974-75

Celje

- Yugoslav Cup
  - Finalist (2): 1978, 1980
- Yugoslav First B/Second League
  - Winner (3): 1979-80, 1980-81, 1982-83

Zamet

- Yugoslav Second League
  - Runner-up (1): 1983-84

Bayer Dormagen

- 2. Bundesliga
  - Winner (1): 1986-87
  - Runner-up (1): 1985-86

Düsseldorf

- 2. Bundesliga
  - Promotion (1): 1990-91

Individual

- Reinickendorfer Füchse top goalscorer - 1984–85 season - 155 goals
