= Borna Franić =

Croatian handball player (born 1975)

Personal information
- Nationality: Croatian
- Born: 3 May 1975 (age 51) Kutina, Croatia
- Height: 193 cm (76 in)

Sport
- Sport: Handball
- Position: Left back
- Number: 8

Youth career
- Years: Team
- –: Moslavina Kutina

Senior clubs
- Years: Team
- 1992-2000: Moslavina Kutina
- 1999-2002: Zamet Autrotrans
- 2002-2003: CB Valencia
- 2003-2004: TV Zofingen
- 2004-2010: TV Endingen
- 2010-2015: Wacker Thun
National team
Years	Team	Apps
–	Croatia	21

Borna Franić (born 3 May 1975) is a former Croatian handball player.

== Honours ==
Moslavina Kutina

- Croatian First B League Promotion (1): 1994-95
- Croatian Cup Final (1): 1996

Zamet Autotrans

- Croatian Cup Final (2): 2000, 2001

Wacker Thun

- Swiss Nationalliga A (1): 2012-13
- Swiss Cup (2): 2012, 2013
- EHF Challenge Cup (1): 2012

Individual

- Swiss Nationalliga A top scorer: 2009-10
