= Danijel Riđić =

Bosnian handball player and coach

Personal information
- Nationality: Croatian, Bosnian
- Born: 10 February 1975 (age 51) Zavidovići, SFR Yugoslavia

Sport
- Sport: Handball
- Position: Left wing
- Current club: Retired

Senior clubs
- Years: Team
- 1992-2000: RK Zamet Rijeka
- 2000-2009: RK Krivaja Zavidovići
National team
- Years: Team
- –: Bosnia and Herzegovina

Teams managed
- 2009-2011: RK Bosna Sarajevo (Assistant coach)
- 2014-2015: RK Konjuh Živinice
- 2015-2016: RK Vogošća Poljine Hills
- 2017-2018: RK Vogošća Poljine Hills
- 2018-: RK Vogošća Poljine Hills

Danijel Riđić (born 9 December 1962) is a former Bosnian national team handball player and current coach.

He is currently the coach of RK Vogošća Poljine Hills.

From 2009 to 2011 he was assistant coach to Irfan Smajlagić in RK Bosna Sarajevo.

During his playing days he was a large influence for Croatian handballer Mateo Hrvatin.

== Honours ==
RK Zamet Rijeka

- Croatian First B League (1): 1995-96
