= Danish Handball Federation =

National governing body for handball in Denmark

Danish Handball Association Danish: DanskHåndbold
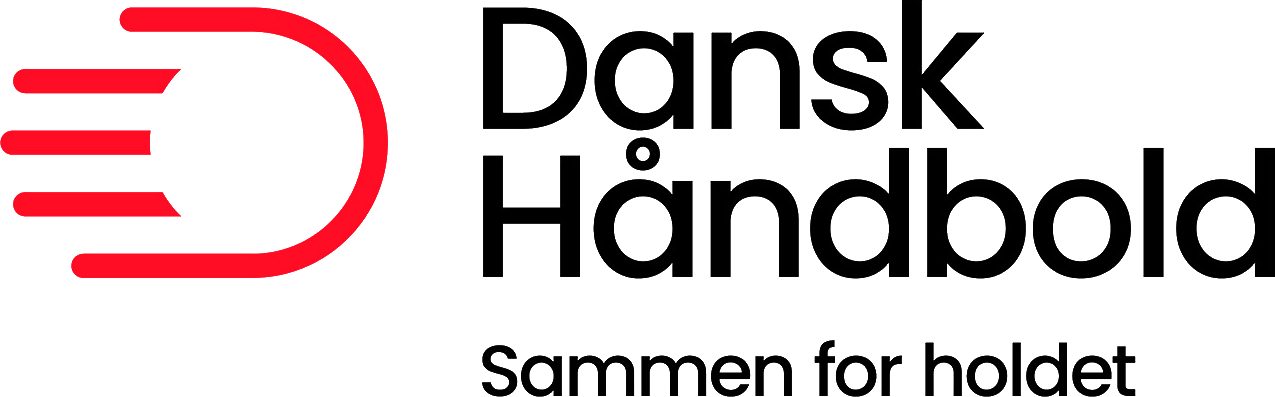
- IOC nation: Kingdom of Denmark (DEN)
- Sport: Handball
- Other sports: Beach Handball; Wheelchair Handball
- Official website: danskhaandbold.dk

HISTORY
- Preceding organisations: Danish Athletics Federation
- Year of formation: 2 June 1935; 91 years ago

DEMOGRAPHICS
- Membership size: 105567 (active members in 2015)

AFFILIATIONS
- International federation: International Handball Federation (IHF)
- IHF member since: 11 July 1946; 80 years ago
- Continental association: European Handball Federation
- National Olympic Committee: National Olympic Committee and Sports Confederation of Denmark

GOVERNING BODY
- President: Mr. Torsten Laen (Denmark)
- Address: Brøndby Stadium, Brøndby
- Country: Denmark

Danish Handball Federation

Medal record

Representing Denmark

Handball

Men's Olympic Championship
Gold medal – first place	2016	Team
Gold medal – first place	2024	Team

World Outdoor Championship
Silver medal – second place	1948	Team

World Championship
Gold medal – first place	2019	Team
Gold medal – first place	2021	Team
Gold medal – first place	2023	Team
Gold medal – first place	2025	Team
Silver medal – second place	2013	Team
Silver medal – second place	2011	Team
Silver medal – second place	1967	Team
Bronze medal – third place	2007	Team

World Junior Championship
Gold medal – first place	2005	Team
Gold medal – first place	1999	Team
Gold medal – first place	1997	Team
Silver medal – second place	2011	Team
Silver medal – second place	2009	Team
Silver medal – second place	2003	Team
Silver medal – second place	1993	Team
Bronze medal – third place	2007	Team
Bronze medal – third place	1983	Team

World Youth Championship
Gold medal – first place	2013	Team
Gold medal – first place	2011	Team
Gold medal – first place	2007	Team

European Championship
Gold medal – first place	2012	Team
Gold medal – first place	2008	Team
Silver medal – second place	2014	Team
Bronze medal – third place	2006	Team
Bronze medal – third place	2004	Team
Bronze medal – third place	2002	Team

European Junior Championship
Gold medal – first place	2010	Team
Gold medal – first place	2008	Team
Gold medal – first place	1998	Team
Gold medal – first place	1996	Team
Silver medal – second place	2004	Team
Bronze medal – third place	2006	Team

European Youth Championship
Silver medal – second place	2008	Team
Silver medal – second place	2006	Team
Silver medal – second place	2001	Team
Bronze medal – third place	2012	Team
Bronze medal – third place	2010	Team
Bronze medal – third place	2004	Team
Bronze medal – third place	2003	Team
Bronze medal – third place	1999	Team
Bronze medal – third place	1994	Team

European Open Men's Youth Championship
Bronze medal – third place	2013	Team

Men's EYOF Championship
Gold medal – first place	2011	Team
Gold medal – first place	1997	Team
Silver medal – second place	2009	Team

European Men's Beach Handball Championship
Bronze medal – third place	2013	Team

Women's Olympic Championship
Gold medal – first place	2004	Team
Gold medal – first place	2000	Team
Gold medal – first place	1996	Team

Women's Youth Olympic Championship
Gold medal – first place	2010	Team

World Women's Street Handball Championship
Silver medal – second place	1962	Team

World Women's Championship
Gold medal – first place	1997	Team
Silver medal – second place	1993	Team
Silver medal – second place	1962	Team
Bronze medal – third place	2013	Team
Bronze medal – third place	1995	Team

World Women's Junior Championship
Gold medal – first place	1997	Team
Silver medal – second place	2008	Team
Silver medal – second place	1995	Team
Silver medal – second place	1987	Team
Bronze medal – third place	1999	Team
Bronze medal – third place	1991	Team

World Women's Youth Championship
Gold medal – first place	2012	Team
Gold medal – first place	2006	Team
Bronze medal – third place	2014	Team
Bronze medal – third place	2008	Team

World Women's Beach Championship
Silver medal – second place	2012	Team
Silver medal – second place	2010	Team

European Women's Championship
Gold medal – first place	2002	Team
Gold medal – first place	1996	Team
Gold medal – first place	1994	Team
Silver medal – second place	2022	Team
Silver medal – second place	2004	Team
Silver medal – second place	1998	Team

European Women's Junior Championship
Gold medal – first place	2011	Team
Gold medal – first place	2007	Team
Gold medal – first place	1996	Team
Bronze medal – third place	2013	Team

European Women's Youth Championship
Gold medal – first place	2009	Team
Gold medal – first place	2005	Team
Silver medal – second place	2011	Team
Silver medal – second place	1992	Team
Bronze medal – third place	2013	Team
Bronze medal – third place	1994	Team

European Open Women's Youth Championship
Gold medal – first place	2006	Team
Gold medal – first place	2010	Team
Silver medal – second place	2014	Team

Women's EYOF Championship
Gold medal – first place	2013	Team
Gold medal – first place	1999	Team
Gold medal – first place	1997	Team
Bronze medal – third place	2011	Team
Bronze medal – third place	2009	Team
Bronze medal – third place	2007	Team
Bronze medal – third place	2005	Team

European Women's Beach Championship
Silver medal – second place	2013	Team
Silver medal – second place	2011	Team

Men's friendly TotalKredit Cup
Gold medal – first place	2014	Team
Gold medal – first place	2012	Team

Men's friendly Golden League
Gold medal – first place	2013	Team

Women's friendly Møbelringen Cup
Gold medal – first place	2005	Team
Silver medal – second place	2024	Team
Silver medal – second place	2016	Team
Silver medal – second place	2012	Team
Silver medal – second place	2011	Team
Bronze medal – third place	2022	Team
Bronze medal – third place	2018	Team
Bronze medal – third place	2010	Team
Bronze medal – third place	2008	Team
Bronze medal – third place	2007	Team

Women's friendly GF World Cup
Silver medal – second place	2008	Team
Bronze medal – third place	2006	Team
Bronze medal – third place	2013	Team

Danish Handball Association (Danish: DanskHåndbold) is the national governing body for handball in Denmark. It is based in Brøndby. It is a member of the European Handball Federation and the International Handball Federation. Danish Handball Association is the third largest in the world, only surpassed by German Handball Association and French Handball Federation. It is the 6th largest sports association in Denmark.

== History ==
Danish Handball Association was founded on 2 June 1935. Before the founding Danish handball was governed by the Danish Athletics Federation. The first official national team game was played on 20 August 1934 as a 11v11 outdoor match against Germany. The first indoor match was held the following year on March 8th against Sweden. DHA was a founding member of IHF in 1946.

From the 1946-47 onwards national tournaments were arranged for the first time. Prior to 1946, four regional tournaments were arranged, and the winner of each of those met in an unofficial tournament. In 1939 Danmarks Idrætsforbund gave permission, making the 1939 championship the official Danish Championship and Handelsstandens Gymnastikforening the first official Danish Champions. There were attempts to make a proper national league, but they were halted by the German occupation of Denmark in the 2nd world war, and therefore the tournament kept its old structure during the war, and in 1945 it was outright cancelled. After the war the Danish Men's Handball League was created.

For economic reasons, a women's tournament could not be arranged at the same time, and therefore they continued with district championships and a final four between those. In 1961-62 two regional divisions were created, and in 1964-64 the national 1st Division was created.

From 1964 the Danish Men's Handball Cup and Danish Women's Handball Cup were introduced.

In the 1990's the Danish handball leagues professionalised, and in 1999 Viborg HK became the first club to turn the elite division into a company.

On 21 August 2023 the association changed their official name from Danks Håndbold Forbund to DanskHåndbold, as well as changed their visual identity and regional structure.

== Regional organizations ==
DanskHåndbold is separated into 4 regional organizations: Nord (north), Midt (central), Syd (south) and Øst (east), based on Danish municipalities.

Prior to 2023 the organization was divided into 3 regions:

- Håndbold Region Øst (HRØ) for Sjælland, Lolland-Falster and Bornholm.
- Fyns Håndbold Forbund (FHF) for Funen
- Jydsk Håndbold Forbund (JHF) for Jutland

== Achievements ==
Denmark is the country with the most success and medals in the sport of Handball. With a total of more than 100 overall medals it makes them the strongest Handball Federation in the World.

Total Host

25

Count

: 43
: 32
: 32

Total : 104

Men's Olympic Championship

: 2016, 2024
: 2021

World Championship

: 2019, 2021, 2023, 2025
: 1967, 2011, 2013
: 2007

World Outdoor Championship

: 1948

Junior World Championship

: 1997, 1999, 2005
: 1993, 2003, 2009, 2011, 2015, 2017
: 1983, 2007

Youth World Championship

: 2007, 2011, 2013
: 2017, 2019

European Championship

: 2008, 2012, 2026
: 2014
: 2002, 2004, 2006, 2022

Junior European Championship

: 1996, 1998, 2008, 2010
: 2004
: 2006

Youth European Championship

: 2001, 2006, 2008
: 1994, 1999, 2003, 2004, 2010, 2012, 2018

Men's European Open Championship

: 2013

Men's EYOF Championship

: 1997, 2011
: 2009

European Men's Beach Handball Championship

: 2019
: 2013

Men's friendly TotalKredit Cup

: 2012, 2014

Men's friendly Golden League

: 2013

Women's Olympic Championship

: 1996, 2000, 2004

Women's Youth Olympic Championship

: 2010

World Women's Street Handball Championship

: 1962

World Women's Championship

: 1997
: 1962, 1993
: 1995, 2013, 2021

World Women's Junior Championship

: 1997, 2016
: 1987, 1995, 2008
: 1991, 1999, 2014

World Women's Youth Championship

: 2006, 2012
: 2016
: 2008, 2014

Women's World Beach Championship

: 2010, 2012

Women's European Championship

: 1994, 1996, 2002
: 1998, 2004, 2022

Women's Junior European Championship

: 1996, 2007, 2011, 2015
: 2017
: 2013

Women's Youth European Championship

: 2005, 2009, 2015
: 1992, 2011
: 1994, 2013

Women's European Open Championship

: 2006, 2010
: 2014

Women's EYOF Championship

: 1997, 1999, 2013
: 2005, 2007, 2009, 2011

Women's Beach European Championship

: 2019
: 2011, 2013

Women's friendly Møbelringen Cup

: 2005
: 2010, 2012, 2016, 2024
: 2007, 2008, 2018, 2022

Women's friendly GF World Cup

: 2008
: 2006, 2013

== Competitions ==
The Danish Handball Federation organises the national club leagues and the national teams (both senior and junior). In addition, the DHF organises international tournaments.

=== National ===
- Danish Handball League
- Danish Women's Handball League
- Danish Handball Cup
- National handball team (women, men)

=== International ===
- GF World Cup, an annual invitational tournament usually played in October

== Competitions hosted ==
=== International ===
- 1978 World Men's Handball Championship
- 1979 Men's Junior World Handball Championship
- 1987 Women's Junior World Handball Championship
- 1999 World Women's Handball Championship
- 2015 World Women's Handball Championship
- 2019 World Men's Handball Championship
- 2023 World Women's Handball Championship

=== Continental ===
- 1996 European Women's Handball Championship
- 2002 European Women's Handball Championship
- 2010 European Women's Handball Championship
- 2013 Women's Under-19 European Handball Championship
- 2014 European Men's Handball Championship
- 2016 European Men's Under-20 Handball Championship
- 2020 European Women's Handball Championship

== Coaching ==
=== Danish International Handball Coaches ===
- Denmark Men's National Handball Team Nikolaj Jacobsen
- Denmark Women's National Handball Team Helle Thomsen
- Greenland Men's National Handball Team Ingi Olsen
- Greenland Women's National Handball Team Johannes Groth
- Faroe Islands Men's National Handball Team Sonni Larsen
- Faroe Islands Women's National Handball Team Claus Mogensen
- Japan Women's National Handball Team Ulrik Kirkely
- Switzerland Women's National Handball Team Martin Albertsen
- China Women's National Handball Team Heine Jensen
- Lithuania Women's National Handball Team Bo Milton Andersen
- United Kingdom Men's National Handball Team Jesper Houmark
