= Vlado Stenzel =

Croatian handball player and coach (born 1934)

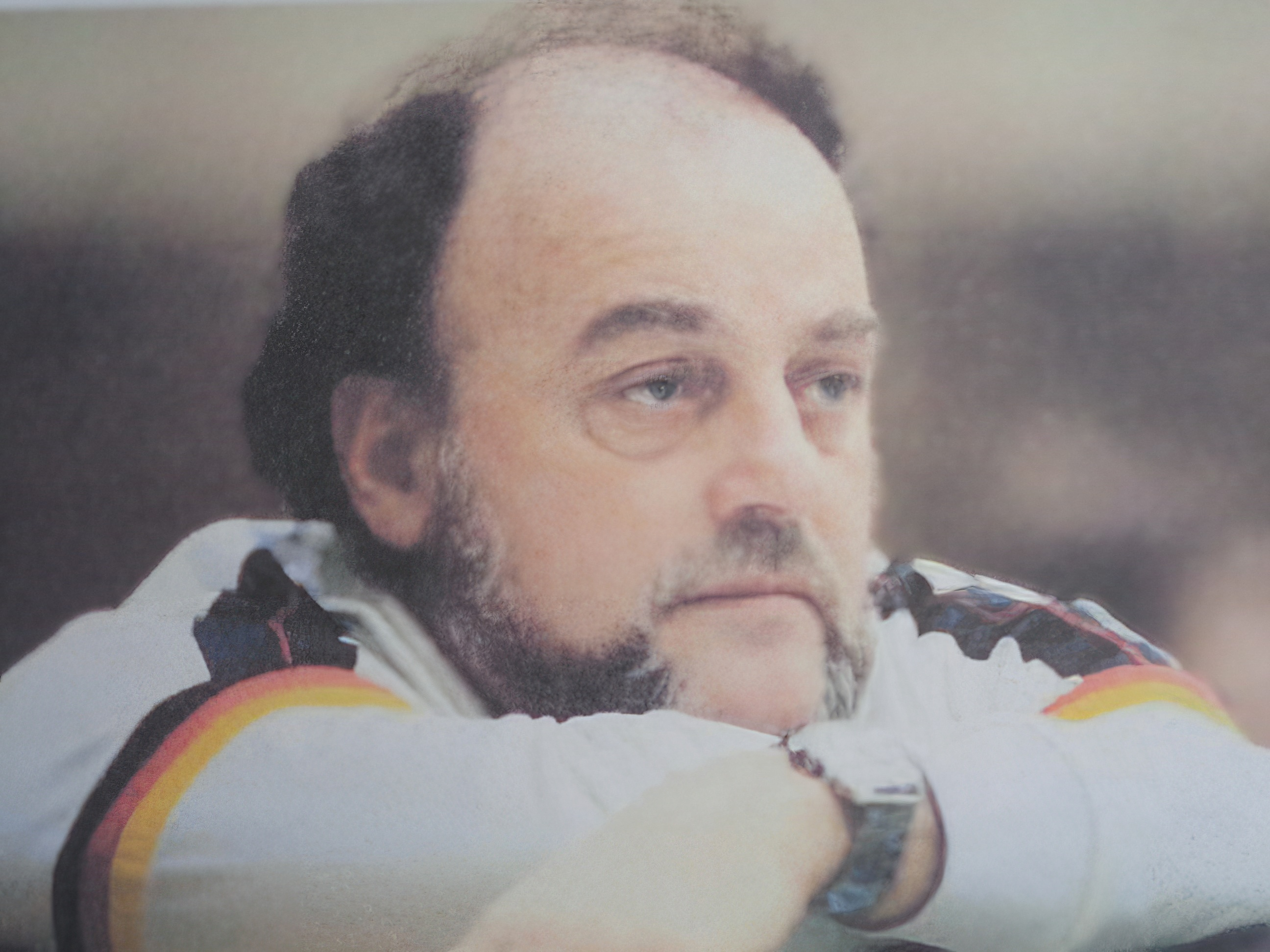

Personal information
- Full name: Vladimir Štencl
- Nationality: Croatian, German
- Born: 23 July 1934 (age 92) Zagreb, Kingdom of Yugoslavia

Sport
- Sport: Handball
- Position: Goalkeeper
- Current club: Retired

Senior clubs
- Years: Team
- 1951-1959: RK Prvomajska Zagreb
National team
Years	Team	Apps	(Gls)
1955	Yugoslavia	1	(0)

Teams managed
- 1962-1967: RK Medveščak Zagreb
- 1967-1972: Yugoslavia
- 1967-1968: RK Crvenka
- 1968-1970: RK Krivaja Zavidovići
- 1970-1973: RK Kvarner Rijeka
- 1973-1974: SC Phönix Essen 1920 e.V
- 1974-1982: West Germany
- 1975-1976: TV Schalksmühle
- 1982-1983: OSC Thier Dortmund
- 1983-1985: HC TuRa Bergkamen
- 1986-1988: VfL Bad Schwartau
- 1988-1990: TSV Milbertshofen
- 1990-1991: VfL Günzburg
- 1991-1993: TsV Bobingen
- 1995: TV Grosswallstadt
- 1995-1997: MTV Ingolstadt
- 1997-1998: SG Bruchköbel
- 1999-2002: SV Anhalt Bernburg
- 2003-2004: HSG Wetzlar
- 2005-2006: 1. FSV Mainz 05
- 2007-2008: TVJK Budenheim
- 2018-: Rk Vodice
Medal record
Representing Yugoslavia
Men's handball
Summer Olympics
Gold medal – first place	1972 Munich	Team competition
World Championship
Bronze medal – third place	1970 France	Team competition
Mediterranean Games
Gold medal – first place	1967 Tunisia	Team competition
Representing Germany
World Championship
Gold medal – first place	1978 Denmark	Team competition

Vlado Stenzel (Croatian: Vlado Štencl; born 23 May 1934) is a Croatian former handball goalkeeper and coach. He had the nickname 'The Wizard'.

He won the 1972 Summer Olympics gold medal with Yugoslavia and the 1978 World Championship with West Germany.

His wife's name is Diana and they have four children: Vanda, Vlatko, Helena, and Daniel.

== Honours ==
As player
Prvomajska Zagreb

- Yugoslav First League
  - Winner (2): 1953, 1954
- Championship of SR Croatia
  - Winner (2): 1954, 1955

As coach
Medveščak Zagreb

- Yugoslav First League
  - Winner (2): 1963-64, 1965-66
- Yugoslav Cup
  - Winner (1): 1965
- European Champions Cup
  - Finalist (1): 1964-65

Yugoslavia

- 1967 Mediterranean Games in Tunisia - 1st place
- 1970 World Championship in France -3rd place
- 1972 Olympic Games in Munich -1st place

Krivaja Zavidovići

- Yugoslav First League
  - Third place (1): 1969-70

West Germany

- 1976 Olympic Games in Canada - 4th place
- 1978 World Championship in Denmark - 1st place
- 1982 World Championship in West Germany - 7th place

Bad Schwartau

- Regional league - North
  - Promotion (1): 1987-88

Milbertshofen

- DHB-Pokal
  - Winner (1): 1990

Anhalt-Bernburg

- Regional league - North
  - Promotion (1): 2000-01
