= Yugoslav Handball Championship =

Sports competition in Yugoslavia

The Yugoslav Handball Championship was the highest level competition in men's team handball in the Socialist Federal Republic of Yugoslavia, played regularly for almost four decades between 1953 and 1992, before being abandoned due to the breakup of Yugoslavia.

== History ==
The first five editions from 1953 to 1957 were decided via a finals play-off tournament contested by clubs who had qualified in regional competitions, before a regular round-robin league format was introduced for the 1957–58 season. The league featured clubs from all of Yugoslavia's federal subjects, with the most successful being RK Bjelovar with 9 titles, followed by RK Borac Banja Luka and RK Metaloplastika with 7 titles each.

Following the dissolution of Yugoslavia in the early 1990s, the competition was eventually succeeded by the following handball leagues:

- Handball Championship of Bosnia and Herzegovina
- (Croatia) Croatian Handball Premier League
- (North Macedonia) Macedonian Handball Super League
- (Montenegro) Montenegrin Men's Handball First League
- (Serbia) Serbian Handball Super League
- (Slovenia) Slovenian First League

== Title holders ==
- .....1953 (Socialist Republic of Croatia) Prvomajska
- .....1954 (Socialist Republic of Croatia) Prvomajska
- .....1955 (Socialist Republic of Serbia) Crvena zvezda
- .....1956 (Socialist Republic of Serbia) Crvena zvezda
- .....1957 (Socialist Republic of Croatia) Zagreb
- 1957–58 (Socialist Republic of Croatia) Partizan Bjelovar
- 1958–59 (Socialist Republic of Bosnia and Herzegovina) Borac Banja Luka
- 1959–60 (Socialist Republic of Bosnia and Herzegovina) Borac Banja Luka
- 1960–61 (Socialist Republic of Croatia) Partizan Bjelovar
- 1961–62 (Socialist Republic of Croatia) Zagreb
- 1962–63 (Socialist Republic of Croatia) Zagreb
- 1963–64 (Socialist Republic of Croatia) Prvomajska/Medveščak
- 1964–65 (Socialist Republic of Croatia) Zagreb
- 1965–66 (Socialist Republic of Croatia) Medveščak
- 1966–67 (Socialist Republic of Croatia) Partizan Bjelovar
- 1967–68 (Socialist Republic of Croatia) Partizan Bjelovar
- 1968–69 (Socialist Republic of Serbia) Crvenka
- 1969–70 (Socialist Republic of Croatia) Partizan Bjelovar
- 1970–71 (Socialist Republic of Croatia) Partizan Bjelovar
- 1971–72 (Socialist Republic of Croatia) Partizan Bjelovar
- 1972–73 (Socialist Republic of Bosnia and Herzegovina) Borac Banja Luka
- 1973–74 (Socialist Republic of Bosnia and Herzegovina) Borac Banja Luka
- 1974–75 (Socialist Republic of Bosnia and Herzegovina) Borac Banja Luka
- 1975–76 (Socialist Republic of Bosnia and Herzegovina) Borac Banja Luka
- 1976–77 (Socialist Republic of Croatia) Partizan Bjelovar
- 1977–78 (Socialist Republic of Bosnia and Herzegovina) Željezničar Sarajevo
- 1978–79 (Socialist Republic of Croatia) Partizan Bjelovar
- 1979–80 (Socialist Republic of Slovenia) Slovan
- 1980–81 (Socialist Republic of Bosnia and Herzegovina) Borac Banja Luka
- 1981–82 (Socialist Republic of Serbia) Metaloplastika
- 1982–83 (Socialist Republic of Serbia) Metaloplastika
- 1983–84 (Socialist Republic of Serbia) Metaloplastika
- 1984–85 (Socialist Republic of Serbia) Metaloplastika
- 1985–86 (Socialist Republic of Serbia) Metaloplastika
- 1986–87 (Socialist Republic of Serbia) Metaloplastika
- 1987–88 (Socialist Republic of Serbia) Metaloplastika
- 1988–89 (Socialist Republic of Croatia) Zagreb
- 1989–90 (Socialist Republic of Serbia) Proleter
- 1990–91 (Socialist Republic of Croatia) Zagreb
- 1991–92 (Socialist Republic of Serbia) Proleter

=== Championships by club ===
Titles	Club	City	Republic
9	Partizan Bjelovar	Bjelovar	(Socialist Republic of Croatia) CRO
7	Borac Banja Luka	Banja Luka	(Socialist Republic of Bosnia and Herzegovina) BIH
7	Metaloplastika	Šabac	(Socialist Republic of Serbia) SRB
6	Zagreb	Zagreb	(Socialist Republic of Croatia) CRO
4	Medveščak	Zagreb	(Socialist Republic of Croatia) CRO
2	Crvena zvezda	Belgrade	(Socialist Republic of Serbia) SRB
2	Proleter	Zrenjanin	(Socialist Republic of Serbia) SRB
1	Crvenka	Crvenka	(Socialist Republic of Serbia) SRB
1	Željezničar	Sarajevo	(Socialist Republic of Bosnia and Herzegovina) BIH
1	Slovan	Ljubljana	(Socialist Republic of Slovenia) SLO

== European success ==
Traditionally one of the strongest handball leagues in Europe, several Yugoslav clubs went on to compete with considerable success in the European Cup (present-day EHF Champions League), the premier continental handball competition. Prior to the breakup of Yugoslavia, six Yugoslav clubs had managed to reach the European finals 11 times, winning four titles.

Club	W	RU	SF	Years won	Years runners-up	Years semi-finalists
(Socialist Federal Republic of Yugoslavia) Metaloplastika	2	1	3	1984–85, 1985–86	1983–84	1982–83, 1986–87, 1987–88
(Socialist Federal Republic of Yugoslavia) Partizan Bjelovar	1	2	2	1971–72	1961–62, 1972–73	1967–68, 1970–71
(Socialist Federal Republic of Yugoslavia) Borac Banja Luka	1	1	—	1975–76	1974–75	
(Socialist Federal Republic of Yugoslavia) Medveščak	—	1	—		1964–65	
(Socialist Federal Republic of Yugoslavia) Slovan	—	1	—		1980–81	
(Socialist Federal Republic of Yugoslavia) Proleter	—	1	—		1990–91	
(Socialist Federal Republic of Yugoslavia) Crvenka	—	—	1			1969–70

=== Notable clubs ===
(at least 10 top-flight seasons or at least one title)

SR Bosnia and Herzegovina

- Borac, Banja Luka
- Željezničar, Sarajevo
- Krivaja, Zavidovići
- Bosna, Sarajevo
- Sloga, Doboj

SR Croatia

- Medveščak, Zagreb
- Partizan, Bjelovar
- RK Zagreb, Zagreb

SR Macedonia

- Pelister, Bitola

SR Montenegro

SR Serbia

- Crvena zvezda, Belgrade
- Crvenka, Crvenka
- Dubočica, Leskovac
- Dinamo, Pančevo
- Železničar, Niš
- Metaloplastika, Šabac
- Proleter, Zrenjanin
- Partizan, Belgrade

SR Slovenia

- Slovan, Ljubljana
