= List of Italian exonyms in Istria =

The following is a list of Italian language endonyms for towns and villages in Istria.

- Istra Istria itself
- Babiči Babici
- Bale Valle
- Barban Barbana
- Baredina Baredina
- Bašanija Bassania
- Bergod
- Bertoki Bertocchi
- Boljun Bogliuno
- Brda Colatto
- Brovinje Brovigne
- Bersez
- Brtonigla Verteneglio
- Buje Buie
- Buzet Pinguente
- Bužinija Butinia
- Čepić Cepici, Ceppich
- Cerovizza Cerovica
- Chermenizza
- Cugn
- Diminiči St Lorenzo d'Albona
- Dubrova Dobrova
- Fianona Plomin
- Fažana Fasana d'Istria
- Crovizza
- Funtana Fontane
- Galižana Gallesano
- Gamboči Gambozzi
- Gomila Gomila
- Gračiśče Gallignana
- Grožnjan Grisignana
- Ičići Icici
- Ika Ika
- Izola Isola d'Istria
- Juricani Giurizzani
- Kaldanija Caldania
- Kanfanar Canfanaro
- Karšete Carsette
- Kastav Castua
- Kastel Castelvenere
- Karvran Carnizza
- Koper Capodistria
- Koromačno Valmazzinghi
- Labin Albona
- Lindar Lindaro
- Lovran Lovrana, Laurana
- Lovrečice San Lorenzo
- Lucija Santa Lucia
- Nova Vas Villa Nova
- Novigrad Cittanova
- Martinčići Martincici
- Marušići Marusici
- Matulji Mattuglie
- Medulin Medolino
- Merišće Merischie
- Mošćenice Moschenizze, Moschiena
- Momjan Momiano
- Motovun Montona
- Opatija Abbazia
- Oprtalj Portole
- Pazin Pisino
- Pelegrin San Pellegrino
- Petrovija Petrovia
- Piran Pirano
- Poreč Parenzo
- Portorož Portorose
- Premantura Promontore
- Pula Pola
- Plavje Plavia Montedoro
- Rabac Rabaz, Porto Albona
- Radini Radini
- Rijeka Fiume
- Rippenda
- Roč Rozzo
- Rovinj Rovigno
- Rovinjsko Selo Villa di Rovigno
- Savudrija Salvore
- Sovinjak Sovignacco
- Štinjan Stignano
- Susak Sansego
- S.Domenica
- S.Martin
- Sv Lovreč Labinski San Lorenzo d'Albona
- Sv Lovreč Pazenatički San Lorenzo del Pasenatico
- Sv Petar u Sumi San Pietro in Selve
- Skitača Schitazza
- Tar Torre
- Tinjan Antignana
- Triban Tribano
- Umag Umago
- Unije Unie
- Vabriga Abrega
- Valica Valizza
- Vettua
- Vilanja Villania
- Višnjan Visignano
- Viškovići Viscovici
- Vižinada Visinada
- Vlakovo Vlahova
- Vlakovo Vlacovi, Istria
- Vodnjan Dignano d'Istria
- Volosko Volosca
- Vrsar Orsera
- Zambratija Zambrattia
- Žbandaj Sbandati
- Žminj Gimino
- Zrenj Stridone

== See also ==
- List of European exonyms
- List of Italian exonyms in Dalmatia
