= List of churches in Istria County =

Istria County is the westernmost county in Croatia. It borders on the north by the country of Slovenia and on the east on the Quarnero (Kvarner) Bay. On the northeast side it borders with Primorje-Gorski Kotar County.

Istria has had an interesting history because it was the center of constant conflicts with various countries, empires and kingdoms of Europe. Because of this there were many monuments, building, including chapels built during the long history.

== List of chapels ==
- St. Lucia d'Albona, (17th century in Skitača)
- San Giovanni Battista, (14th century in Brovinje)
- San Giuseppe in Koromacno, 20th century (today a market in Koromačno)
- San Martino in Cerovica (Istria) in Cerovica (ruins, 18th century)
- San Matteo under Mt. Babrini (ruins, 13th century)
- St. Lorenzo in Produbas also called San Lorenzo d'Albona and Sveti Lovrec Labinski in the hamlets Diminići and Kobaici (17th century). This chapel became a parish during the division of the District of Albona in 1632.
- Santa Marina in S.Marina (Istria) in Santa Marina (13th century). Restored in 1926.
- St. Nicolo in Drenje

== See also ==
- Brovinje
- Cerovica (Istria)
- Koromačno
- Skitača
