= Istrian Circle =

Province of the Kingdom of Illyria

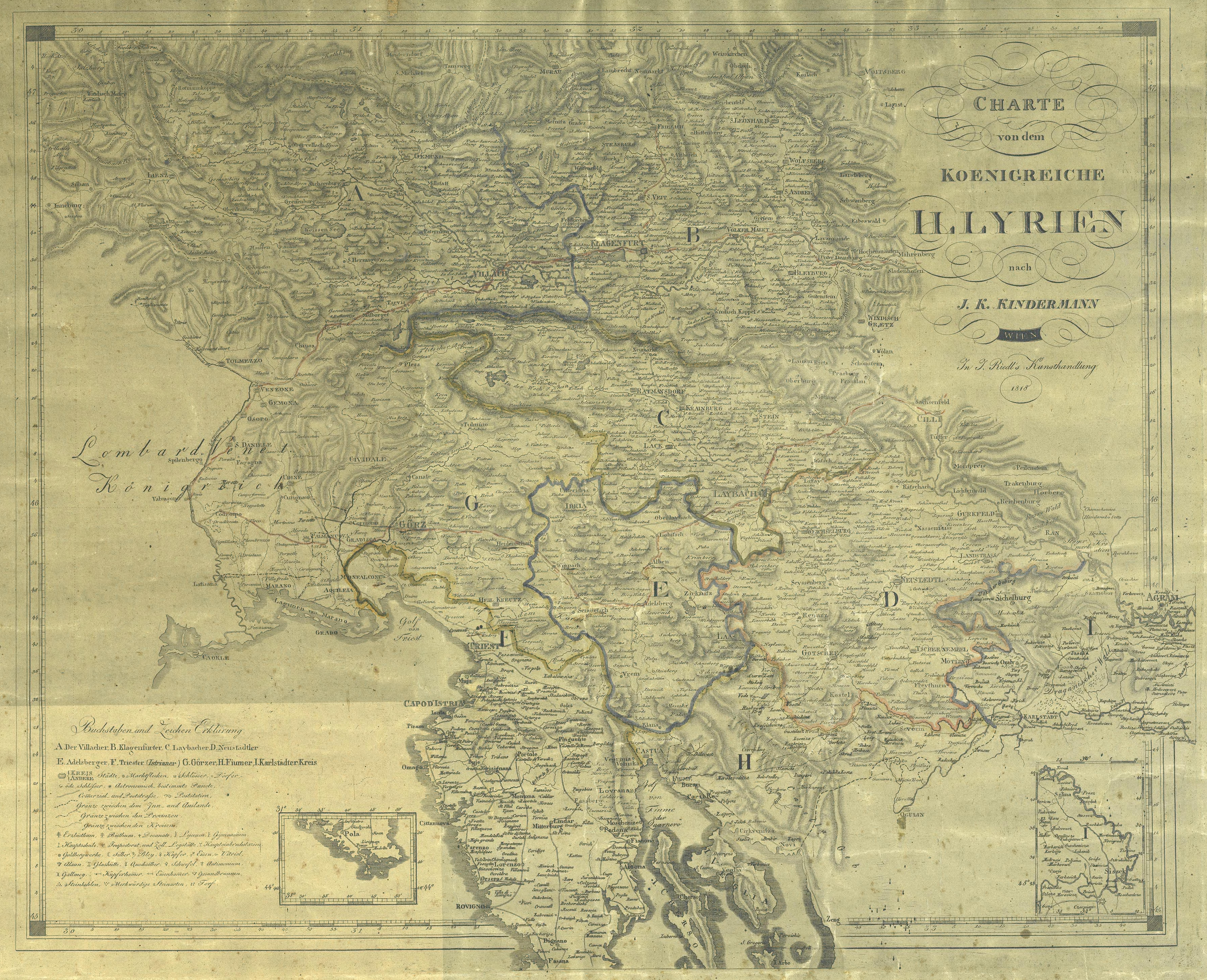
Kingdom of Illyria in 1818

The Istrian Circle or Circle of Istria (German: Istrianer Kreis: Italian: Circolo d'Istria; Serbo-Croatian: Istarskog okružja) was a province of the Kingdom of Illyria from 1825 until 1849. It was formed by merging the circle of Trieste with the district of Pisino, thus reuniting most of the Istrian peninsula. In 1849 Illyria was reincorporated into the Austrian Empire and Istria returned to being a crownland (Kronland) of Austria as the March of Istria. The capital of the Istrian Circle was Pisino. The circle was divided into the following districts: Albona, Bellai, Buie, Capodistria, Cherso, Dignano, Lussino, Montona, Parenzo, Buzet, Pirano, Pisino, Rovigno, Pula, Veglia and Volosca.

== Districts in the Labinština ==
Two antique castles, Albona/Labin and Fianona/Plomin which were two Agricultural Comunes, (municipalities during the Venice Republic under the control of the Podestá (Mayor/Magistrate). Each was subdivided into twelve fractions called Districts/Contrade, by the Administrator of Dalmatia and Albania, Antonio Civran, in 1632, as follows: Albona, Rippenda, Santa Domenica d'Albona/Sveta Nedelja, Istria, Dubrova, Vettua, Cere, Cugn, Bergod, Chermenizza, Vlakovo, Cerovica/Cerovizza. Later the District of Bersez, which included S.Martin was taken from the District of Volosca and added to the District of Albona.

== Austrian repartition ==
During the Austrian repartition of 1814 and 1818, the Austrians maintained the two agricultural comunes.

1. Fianona, which were the division fractions of Fianona, Cerre, Cugn, S.Domenica, Dubrova, Ripenda, Vettua.
2. Albona, which was the division fraction were: Albona, Chermenizza, Bergod, Vlakovo, Ceroviza, Berseg.

== District of Albona ==
The District of Albona/Labin included the whole Territory of Labinština/Labinscina peninsula. This included all the Municipalities within its territory. The Municipalities are Townships within each District. The District of Albona was the Head District/Capocomune of the Labinština Peninsula during the Austria's control, and consisted of twelve sub-districts or fractions: Albona, Ripenda, Santa Domenica d'Albona/Sveta Nedelja (Istria), Dubrova (Istria), Vettua, Cere, Cugn, Bergod, Chermenizza, Vlakovo, Cerovizza/Cerovica (Istria), Bersez.

== See also ==
- Diet of Istria
- Austrian Littoral
