= Koromačno =

Koromačno Valmazzinghi
- Village
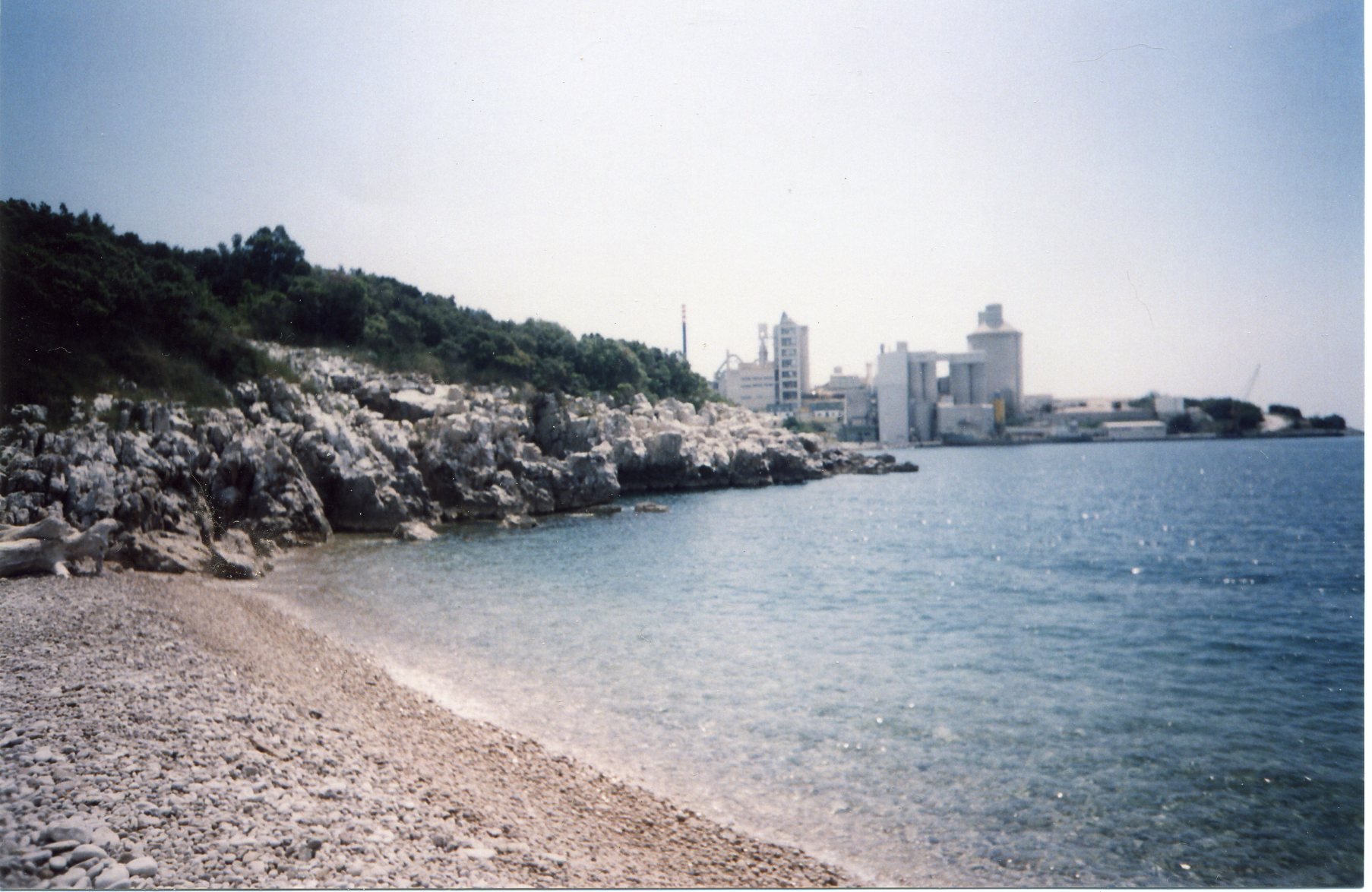
- Overlooking the cement factory and port Koromačno from Pripogni beach

- Location within Croatia
- Coordinates: 44°58′7″N 14°7′24″E
- Country: Croatia
- County: Istria County
- Municipality: Raša

Area
  - Total: 1.5 sq mi (3.9 km^{2})

Population (2021)
  - Total: 139
  - Density: 92/sq mi (36/km^{2})
- Time zone: UTC+1 (CET)
  - Summer (DST): UTC+2 (CEST)
- Postal code: 52222
- Area code: 3855
- Website: jadroagent.hr

Koromačno (Croatian: Koromačno, Italian: Valmazzinghi as it was called under the Italian control) is a small hamlet adjacent to the cement factory for which it was built in the early 1900 for the workers. It is also a small port to accept small cargo ships to carry the cement to other placed to be processed. It is located in the southernmost tip of the Labinština (Italian: L'Albonese) peninsula in Istria County in Croatia. It is nestled between Croatian: Crna Punta and Croatian: Ubac on the Gulf of Quarnero in the Adriatic Sea. It is one of the newest hamlet not even 100 years old. It is located about 15 km from Croatian: Labin / Italian: Albona, 1 km from Croatian: Brovinje, 3 km from Croatian: Skitača.

Koromačno, was named after a local wild plant, Croatian: koromač, Italian: finocchio or fennel, which grows wild all along the coastal area. In the 1800s it shows on the map as "Valle Coromaschizza di St. Giovanni". In the 1800 the Austria-Hungary government started surveying Cadastral surveying mapping all the land in their possession. They made Cadastral maps, which show boundaries and ownership of property. A Cadastre is a register of real estate. In the English: District of Labin /Italian: Distretto di Albona this, as yet, unsettled was called Punta Cromatz.

== Demographics ==
According to the 2021 census, its population was 139. It was 180 in 2011.

== Beaches ==
The rocky coast has a number of small beaches scattered along the coast. The Koromačno beach is next to the cement factory pier. The next one going west is the Dobra beach and is overlooked by the hamlet of the same name Dobra. The next beach still west is called Priponji beach. This is a secluded beach nestled between rough and rocky coast. Following this is a small beach which locals call Presicin beach. The area was called the "Pescheria" (fishery) in the old maps of 1820. The fisherman held nets from rowboats to trap fish in the nets. Slowly they dragged the full net to the beaches to gather the fish.

On the east side of the cement factory, is the location of the Voscice beach.

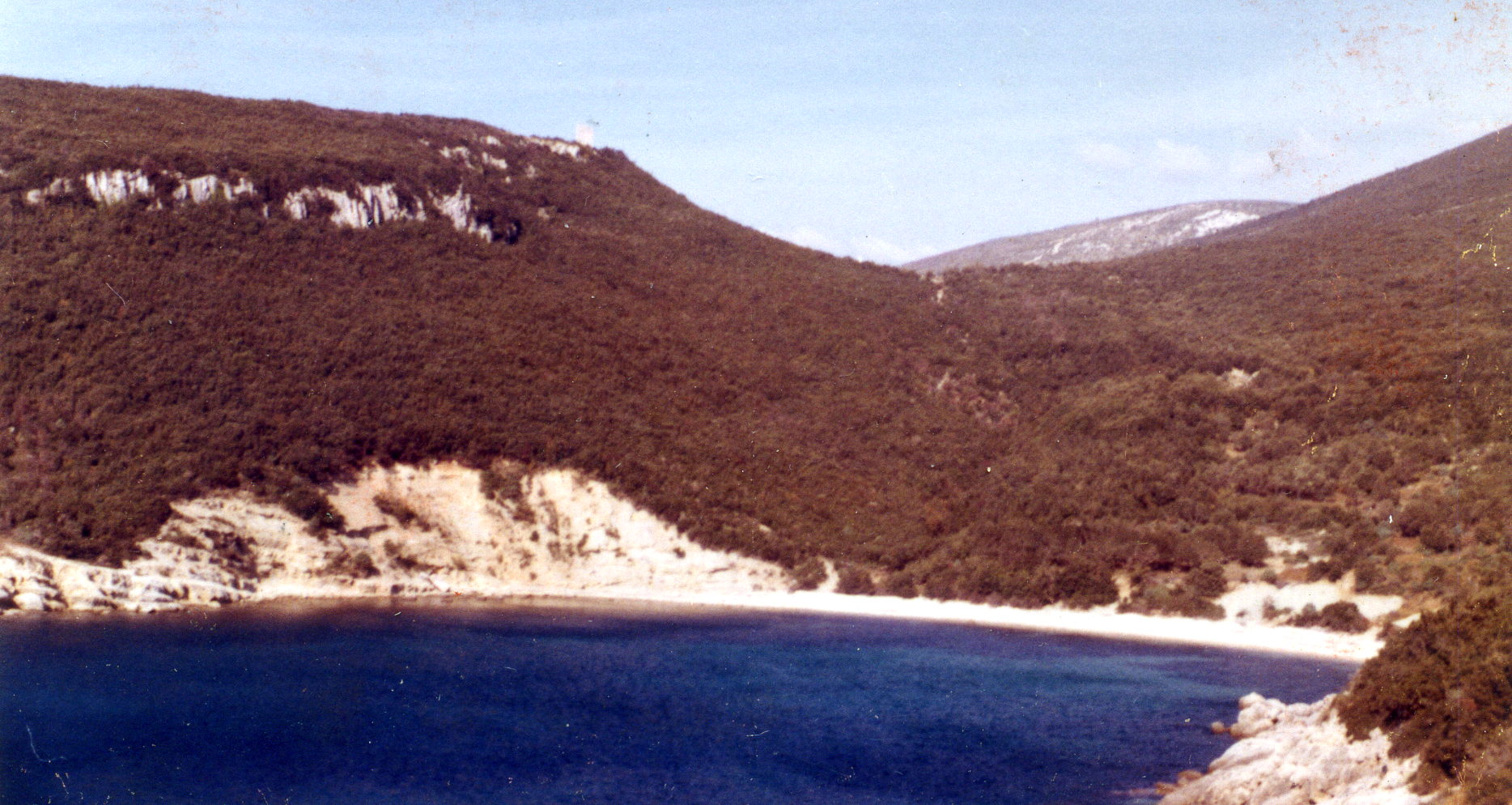
Voscice

This beach has only a small inlet from the Gulf of Quarnero. The next beach is located not far, on the east side of Voscice, is called Barloda beach.

There are many such small beaches along the coast of Istria. Tourists from all over Europe vacation on this coast. All the beaches consist of small rounded flat stones of many different colors. In the 1820 Cadastro Franceschino maps the beach was called Porto Voscice also called in 1632 Porto St. Giovanni and was one of the five ports on the east coast of Istria from Fianona to Voscice. This was the spot where a flat bottom boat called Trabacula came to load logs of timber for Trieste and Venice. The forest owners would cut trees and load them on a small pier where the boat would dock to load the timber. The boat captain would pay one half of the value of the timber and the other half on the next trip. According to the historians, in 1616, during the war with Turkey, in a small inlet of Punta Nera or Crna Punta a Turkish boat was anchored where it could not be seen by the sea or land. The local people happened to see the boat and called for help. They overtook the boat and took some prisoners of the crew. PageXVI Title:Archeografo Triestino: Raccolta di Memorie, Notizie, documenti...Vol. 1 Albona cenni storici Statuto Municipale della Citta d'Albona del A'1341 (Published by Societa del Gabinetto di Minerva in Trieste 1870)

== Cement factory ==
In the early 1900 each of the properties of the area near the coast, where the future cement operation was to be built, were bought up by the Sicilian Industrialist, Mr. Conigliero, from the society S.P.E.M.A "Societa Potland e Marna Albona". The Director was Mr. D'Aquisto who lived temporarily in Brovinje. Mr. Conigliero visited, Koromačno with his wife once a year bringing gifts for all the children. Between 1920 and 1940 the hamlet Valmazzinghi, as it was called then, sprung up after the new cement factory was established. Later it was called Koromačno. There was need for housing as more and more new people came to work and settle there. The dwellings were built by the beach area which the natives called Dobro thus the hamlet of Dobra was born. In 1940 the chapel of St. Giuseppe was built in Koromačno, after WW2 the chapel became a movie theater. Then the bell tower was removed and later it became a market as it is today.

== School ==
On the lower side of the, Labin to Koromačno road, at the very beginning of the hamlet, stands the building which was the Koromačno one room schoolhouse for grades 1–5 in the 1940–50s. Children enrolled from 1st grade to 5th grade. A third place classrooms were set was in an apartment building in Dobra. In the one room schoolhouse the teacher's apartment occupied the second floor. Outside the front door of the building was the bell which let the teacher signal the children to come in the classroom. There were three rows of double desks in the classroom. The teacher seated an older child next to the new child so that the older one would help the young one. As the population of children grew additional classrooms were needed. Each classroom had a specific grade. One of these classrooms was the house, the first one in Koromačno, which was located right across from the one room schoolhouse and on the upper side of the road. This was the Glavicich (Lemeh) house. This was in 1949. Two classroom were located on the ground floor. Later as the new apartment houses were built in the hamlet of Dobra for the workers of the cement quarry and factory, some of the classrooms were installed in those apartments for the growing population of children.

== Dobra ==
Next to the hamlet-port of Koromačno, the cement factory built a group of buildings with multiple apartments in each. This new settlement is called Dobra. These modern buildings, in 1935–40, were made specifically for the cement factory workers and families which migrated to the area. Some of these were empty at the beginning. The need for classroom space made it necessary to occupy some of these empty apartments as the children population increased. A few miles north there is another hamlet called Croatian: Brovinje. From Brovinje going east and north is the hamlet of Skitača where the parish church of St Lucia delle lacrime, is still standing since the year 1616. From Brovinje going west is the hamlet of Viškovići and Diminići where the church of Sv Lovreč Labinski still standing since the 17th century. The cement factory became a very important employer for the local communities between the two wars. After the second World War automation caused jobs to disappear to a minimum at the end of the 20th century.

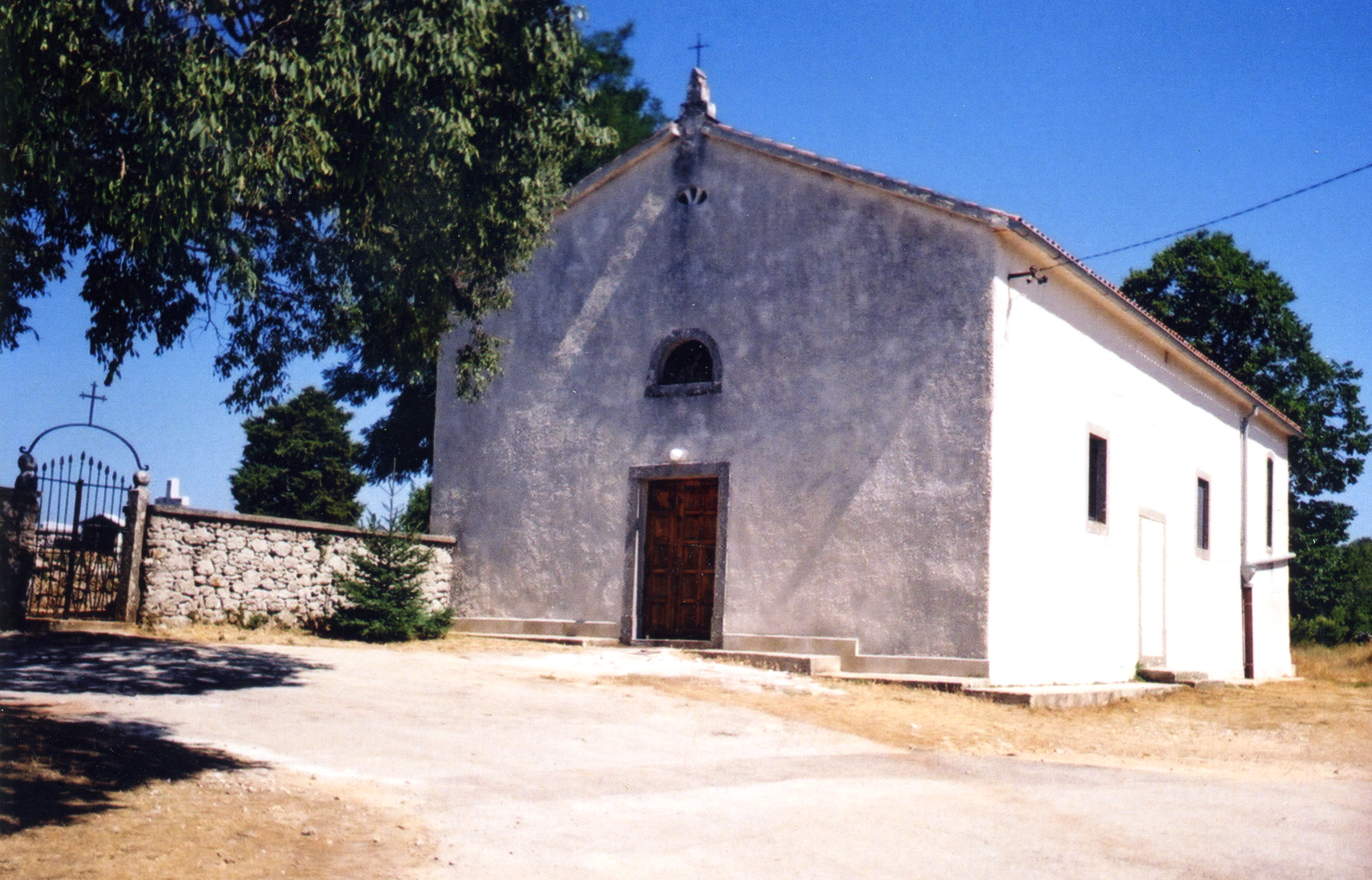
St Lucia church, in Skitaca001

== Turan ==
The antique signaling tower Turan, also called Ivanac and St. Giovanni in Besca, was demolished in 1992 by the cement factory's progress in mining the quarry. There were many of these signaling towers on the Istria coast. These antique signaling towers were constructed under the Roman Empire and also used under the Venice Republic all along the coast and on high hills inland. At night a fire was lit and by day smoke was used to signal the other towers within view. At night these towers on the coast also were used to signal vessels coming to the area. These towers were set up in a net pattern so that each would be able see and to communicate with a few others which were visible to them.

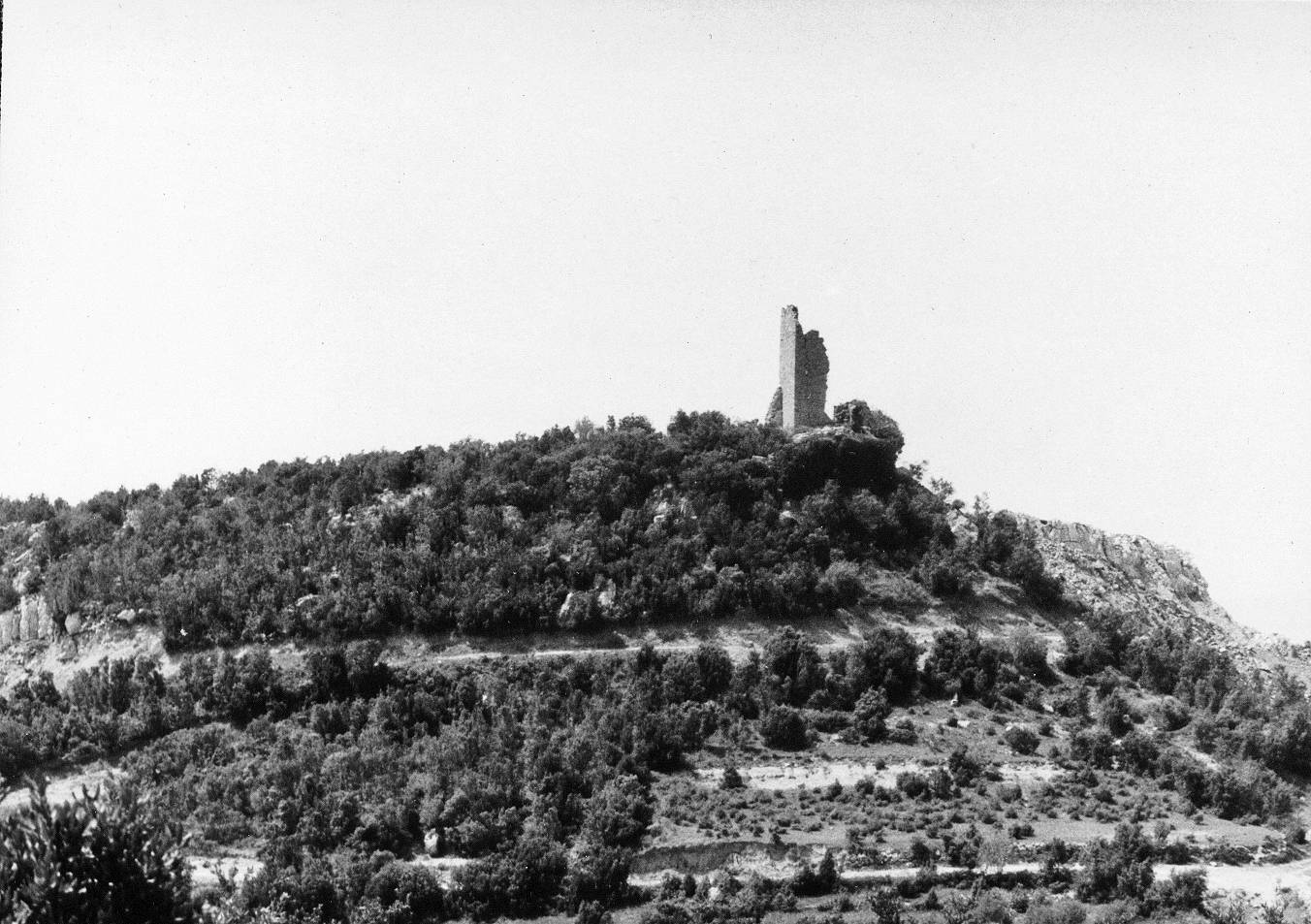

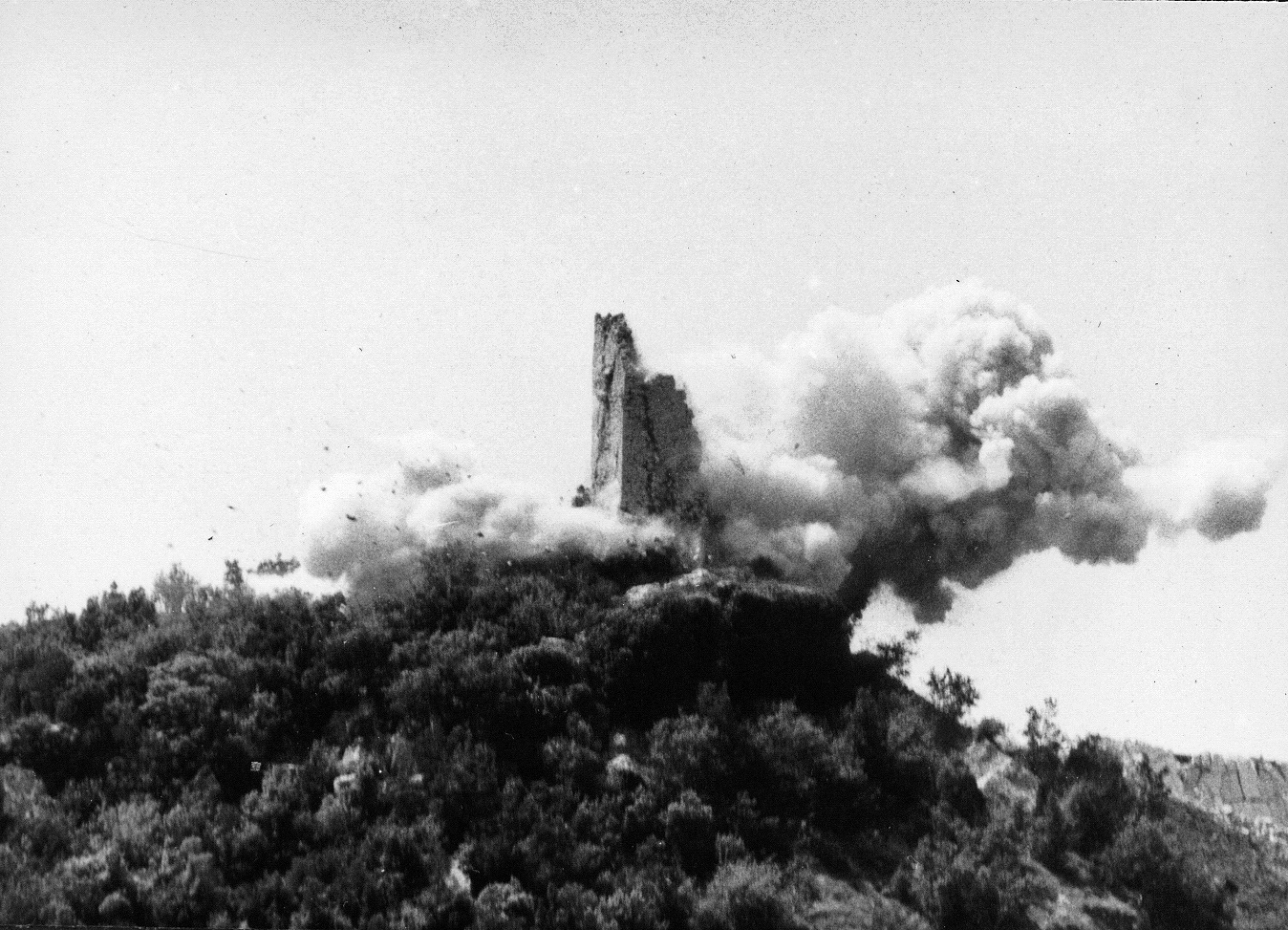

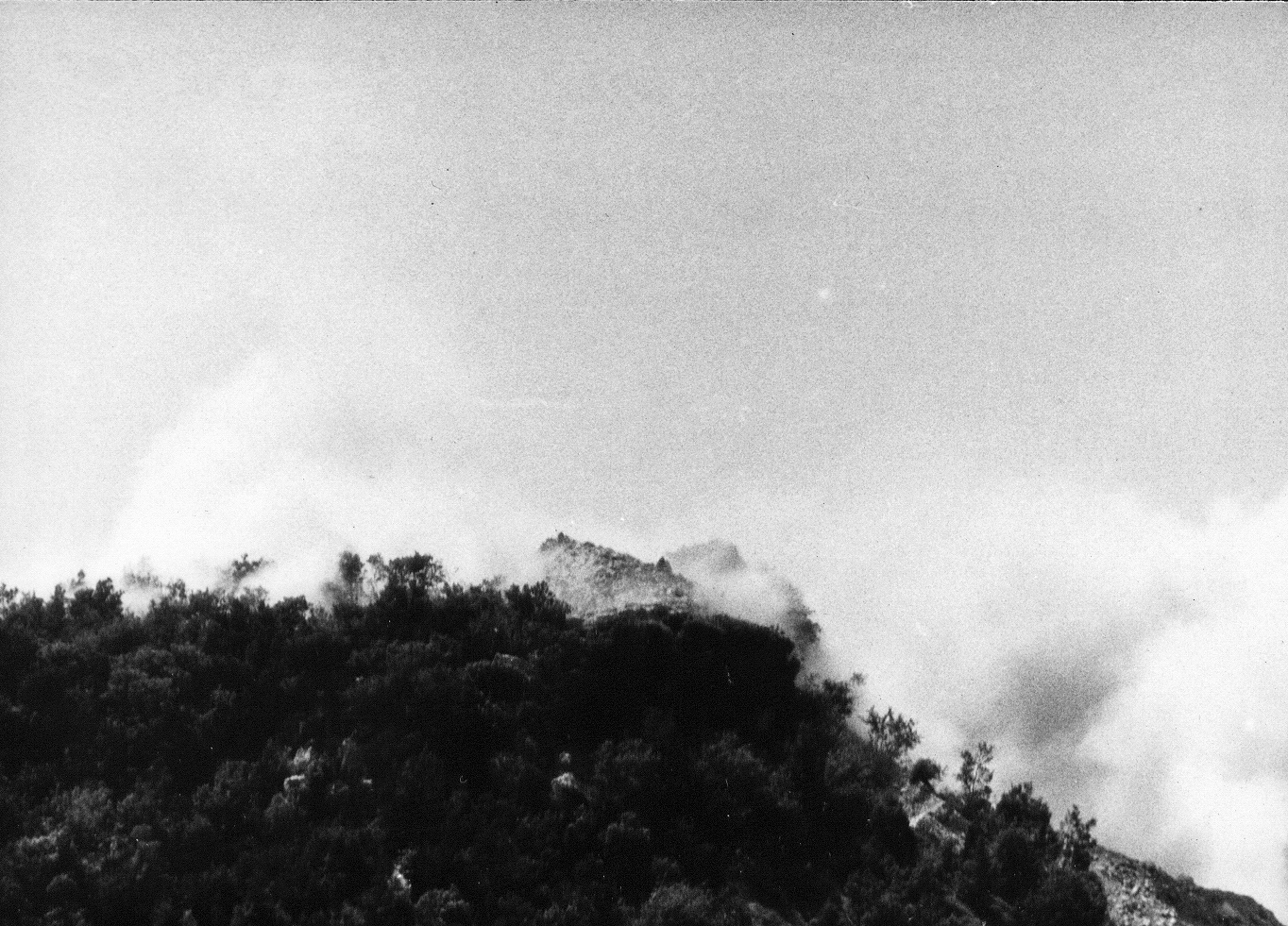

== Chapel ==
The small country chapel of the 14th or 15th century called Italian: St. Giovanni Battista or Croatian: Sv. Ivan is located 100 meters north of the Turan.

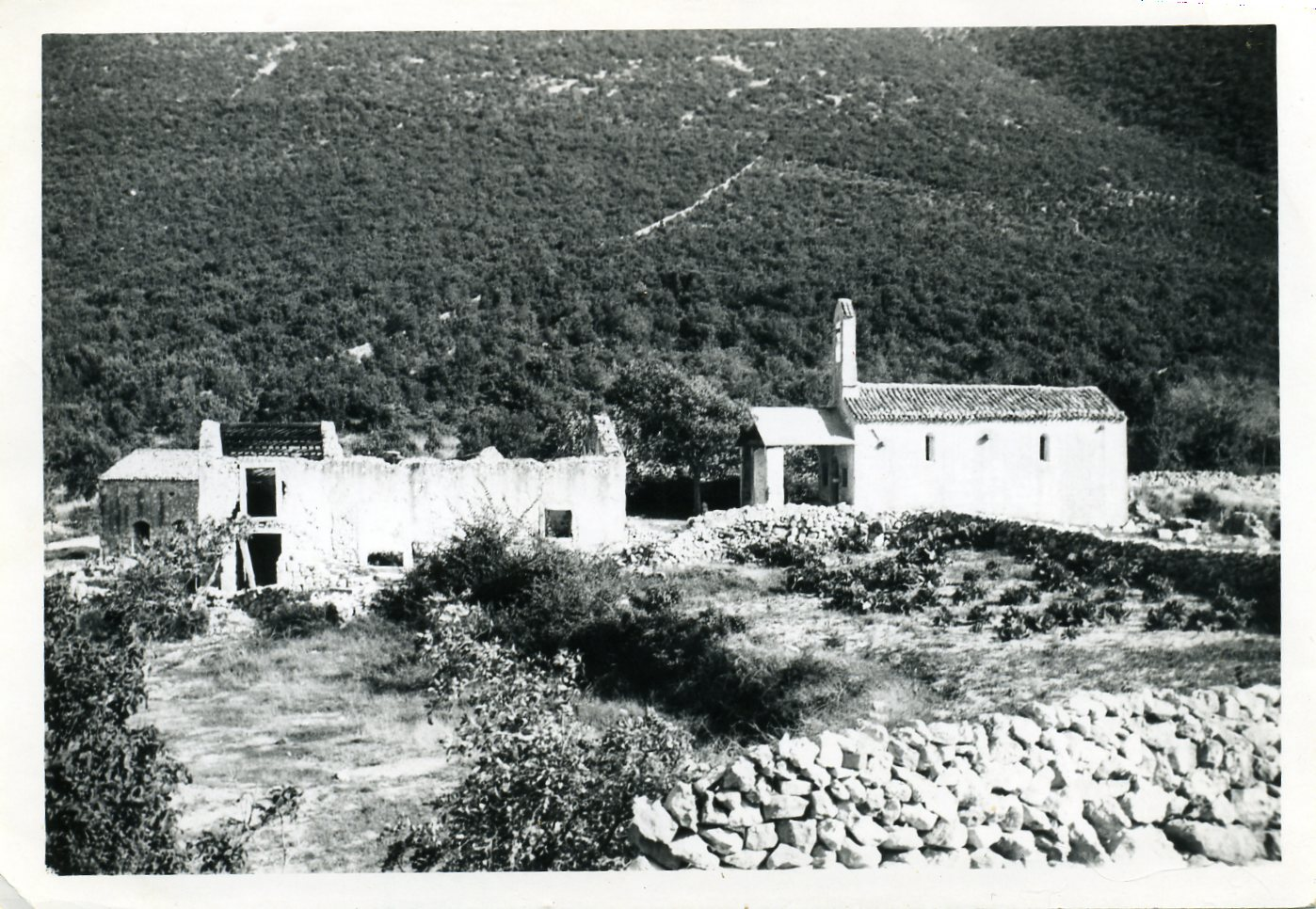
St. Ivan 1930-1940

This chapel belonged to the Abbey by the same name. The Abbey consisted of a two story house, to the rear a separate building with rooms which each friar occupied. The Abbey was abandoned in the mid 16th century. The house was occupied by the farmer-worker (colonist) who took care of the property for the church. With the breakup of the noble class, the colonist farmer became possessor of the property.

== Road ==
The gravel road from Labin to Koromačno and from Brovinje to Skitača was built in the 1930–40. Later it was cemented for easy travel. The company built a ship docking area to load the cement and to unload the coal, on which the factory operated. Later it became a minor port, Port Valmazzinghi/Koromačno, and occasionally the cargo ships brought Italian passengers to the area for vacation. Today the whole region is a booming vacation spot which more and more people discover yearly.

== Present ==
There was an immense change in the area over the last hundred years. Communication and travel was made easier. Telephones came into operation at the central office and later at the Post Office. A regular bus schedule to Labin/Albona made it possible for the people to travel in less than one hour compared to walking for three hours. In the late 1950s electrification and in the 1960s a central water system arrived in the area. In the late 1990s the gravel roads were cemented for easy travel. The people who vacation yearly in the area come from all parts of Europe and the United States.

== See also ==
- Labinština
- Cerovica (Istria)
- chapels in Istria County
- District of Albona
