= Brovinje =

Brovinje Brovnje Brovigne
- Village
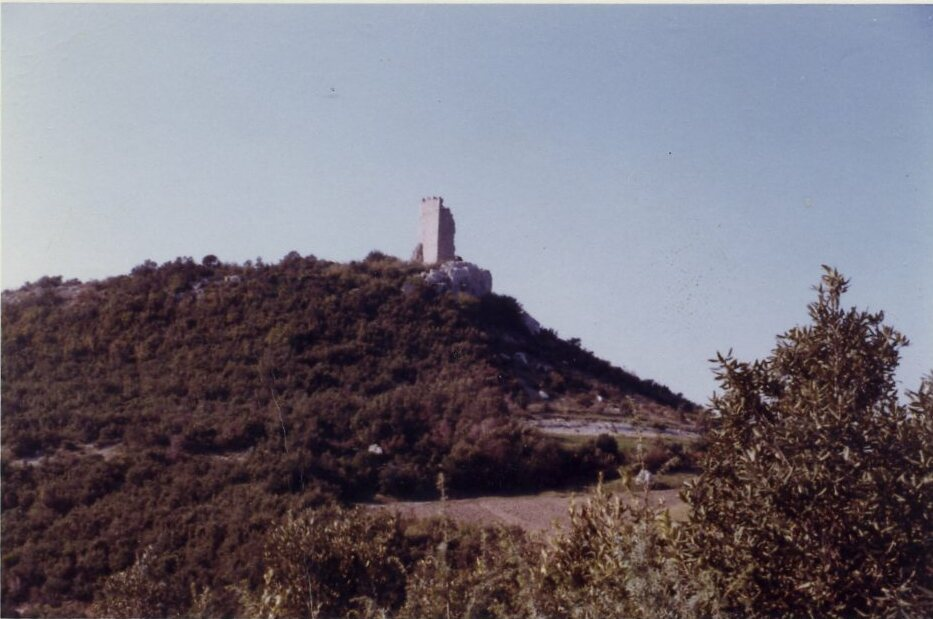
- Tower (Turan) in Brovinje

- Location within Croatia
- Coordinates: 44°58′7″N 14°7′24″E
- Country: Croatia
- County: Istria County
- Municipality: Raša

Area
  - Total: 2.3 sq mi (5.9 km^{2})

Population (2021)
  - Total: 71
  - Density: 31/sq mi (12/km^{2})
- Time zone: UTC+1 (CET)
  - Summer (DST): UTC+2 (CEST)
- Postal code: 52222 Koromačno
- Area code: 052

Brovinje (Italian: Brovigne) is a small settlement/hamlet, in Istria County in Croatia, with a little more than 50 houses in 1950. It is located in the Labinština peninsula of Istria County, Croatia. Overlooking the Gulf of Kvarner in the northern Adriatic Sea including the island of Croatian: Cres, Italian: Cherso. It is located 13 km south-east of Labin and 3 km north of Koromačno/Valmazzinghi. The first written record with the name Brovinje is recorded in the old St. Lucia church books on birth, marriages and deaths in 1705 which are held in Pazin, Istria. Brovinje is a hamlet which is under the Raša municipality.

== History ==
During the Austria-Hungary occupation the Austrian Littoral was established. The littoral was officially the Trieste Province, one of the two provinces of the kingdom. The other being German: Laibach, Croatian: Ljubljana. One of the two Provinces was subdivided into four districts: Gorizia, Eastern Istria and the Quarnero Islands, Trieste and Western Istria and Trieste city.

Around 1824 the Littoral was reorganized into two subdivisions: Istria with the capitol German: Mitterburg, Italian: Pisino, Croatian: Pazin and Gorizia with Trieste and its immediate surroundings under the direct control of the crown and separate from the local administrative structure.

In the Italian: Archivo di Stato Di Trieste / English: State Archives of Trieste, Italian: Ministero dei beni e delle attivitá culturali e del turismo / English: Ministry of Cultural Heritage and Activities, in the Catasto Franceschino 23 December 1817, we read that to simplify the census, for the Littoral, the authority made further fraction subdivisions into townships Italian: contrade or (Italian: ville). In the Albona territory, called Labinština, one of these was the township of Italian: Cerovizza Croatian: Cerovica (Istria). The hamlet of Brovinje was one of many small hamlets, (Hamlet consist of a handful of houses in a settlement), belonging to the township of Cerovica (Istria) under the Austria-Hungary occupation. The headquarters of the township of Cerovica was in the chapel office of St. Lucia in Skitača. In 1827 the census of Cerovica had 99 families in 86 houses and a population of 427persons, 211 males and 216 females. The house were made of stone with thatched roofs.

The small country chapel of Croatian: Sv.Ivana Krstitelja, Italian: San Giovanni Battista is just outside the hamlet Brovinje and it is only used each year on August 29, the feast of the Saint. The chapel was built in the 13th-14th century. It was constructed of stone with Spanish tiles roof. On the front roof it had a mounted bell tower. Inside the small chapel there is a fresco of St. Anthony of Padua behind the marble altar. The front of the chapel had a cover to protect the people who listened to the service from the outside of the chapel. Next to the chapel stand the ruins of the antique Abbey by the same name, (closed in the mid 16th century). Each friar's living quarter is located to the rear of the house building. The house was lived by the family who worked the land until the early 1900.Thumbnail:

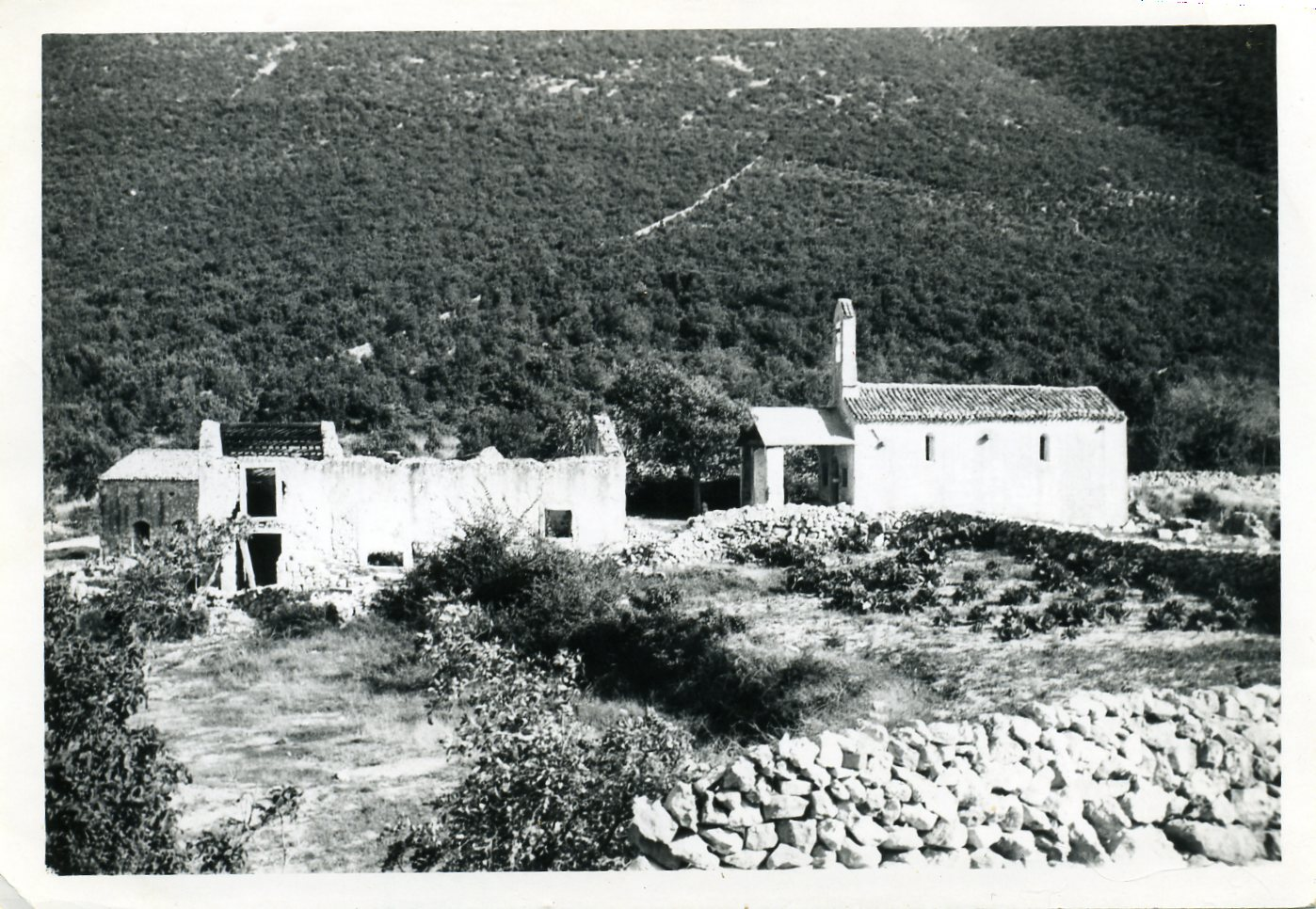
Brovinje, Sv.Ivan

People of Brovinje attended the Parish church of St. Lucia {lang-it|(delle lacrime)} (of the tears) in the hamlet of Skitača and the Parish church of St. Lovreč Labinski in the hamlet of St. Lovreč Labinski. It is located a little north of the hamlet of Diminići. in the township/contrada of Vlakovo, Istria. The churches of St Lucia and St. Lovreč were built in the early 17th century.

== Turan ==
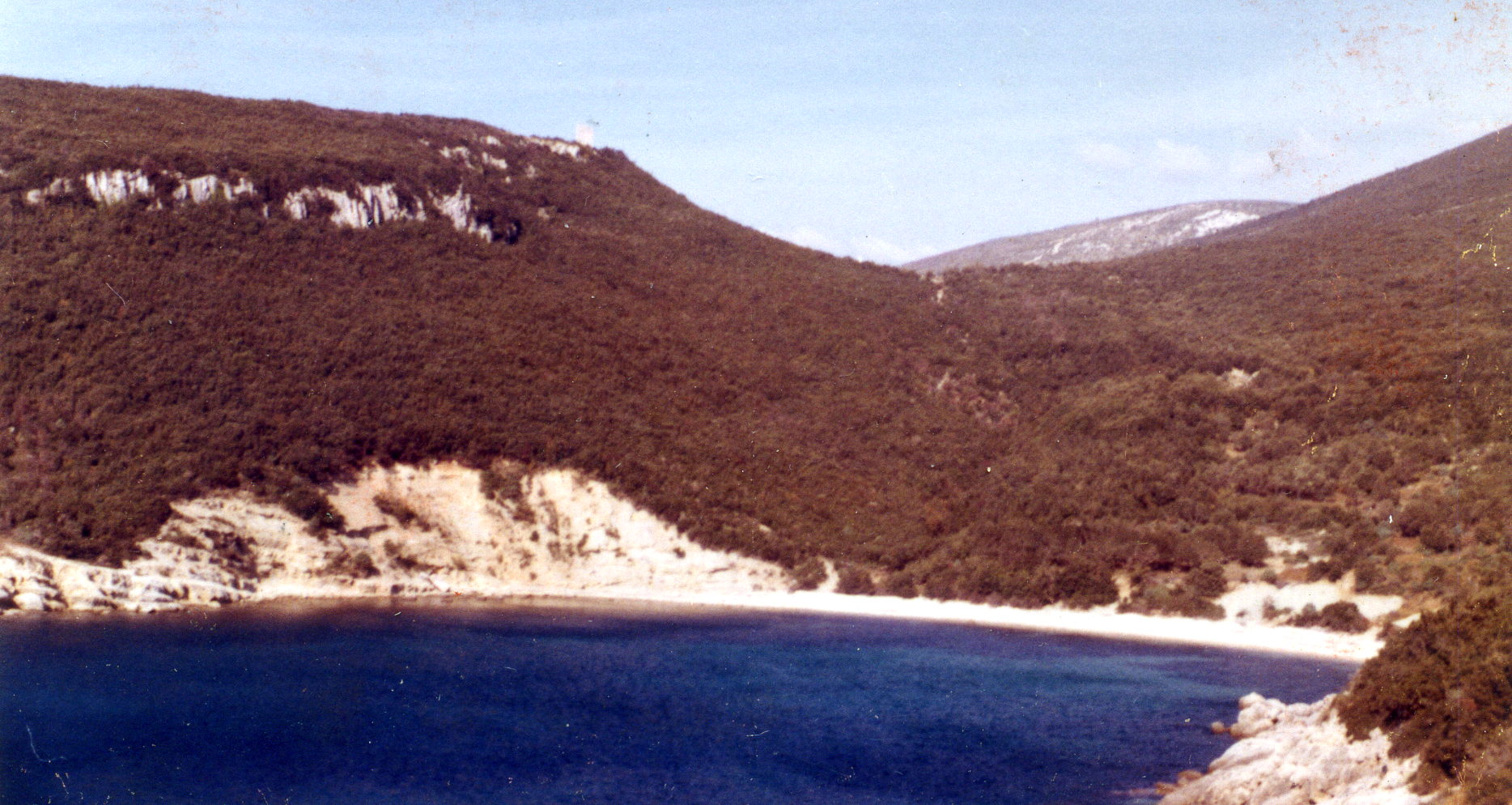
Voscice beach

Overlooking the chapel of Sv Ivan was the Tower of San Giovanni which local people called Turan, but writers called it Gradaz and Ivanaz. The old maps and writers also called it St. Giovanni in Besca. This tower construction was said to be of the Roman era. It is located in the Gulf of Quarnero just east of the inlet of Raša canal just south of Crna Punta at the inlet of the canal. The Tower (Turan) was used for signaling the ships and during war. Later was replaced by automatic lighthouse. There are many of these antique towers in the gulf coast and the Raša canal. The Turan was demolished in the late 1900 by the cement factory in Koromačno. Here are three files which shows just moments before and during the destruction of the antique ruins. File:Turan-Gradaz in 1992-1.JPG File:Turan-Gradaz in 1992-2.JPG File:Turan-Gradaz in 1992-3.jpg Captain Robert Burton in his, "Notes on the Castellieri or Prehistoric ruins on the Istrian Peninsula", lists the 15 Castellieri in the Territory of Albona/ Labinština on page 392.

== Castellieri culture in the Labinština ==
Cosliacco	AKA Castelliere di Monte Zucchero
Gradina di Cosliacco	Between Vosilli and Fianona
Sumber	Upper canal/river Arša/Arsia - between Albona and Pedena
Gradina	Near Sumber
Starigrad dai Rusich - Lower eastern Val d'Arsia - Vettua di Albona	
Punta di Santa Croce	Near Zamparovizza at St Martino - Vettua di Albona
Gradaz	Near the mouth of Canale D'Arsia, over the Valle dei Tonni- near Punta Ubas, in the comune Cerovizza di Albona
Gradina	Near St Gallo d'Albona
Gradina	In the woods of Punta Ubas opposite Castelvecchio in the comune di Cerovizza
Cunzi	Valle of Rapenda in the comune of Rapenda 1200 feet above Rabaz
Punta di Porto lungo	An outlet and port south south east of Albona
? Ruins of the Castallieri	On the heights between Fianona and Zagorie
? Ruins of the Castallieri	On the heights between Fianona and Zagorie
? Ruins of the Castallieri	On the heights between Fianona and Zagorie
? Ruins of the Castellieri	On the heights between Fianona and Zagorie

== Migration ==
Due to the war between the Venice Republic and Austria-Hungary Empire, many people living in the countryside left for the cities for safety. This left Istria destroyed and depopulated. The Republic started the migration of people from its southern counties and islands.

The migration in the 16th, 17th and 18th century brought to the depopulated Istria a new people, the Slavs (Croats, Serbs, etc.) Greeks, Jews, to colonize and clean the countryside, from southern places of the Venice Republic. Each immigrant family was given a tract of land to cultivate for a period of time and pay no taxes for five years if they could live off the land.

In the 20th century, the cement factory was built at "Punta Cromatz" now called Koromačno, also called "Valle Coromaschizza di St. Giovanni". People moved to the area for work from other parts of the former Yugoslavia.

== Demographics ==
According to the 2021 census, its population was 71. As of the 2011 Croatian census, it had a population of 81.

=== Brovinje Population Census ===
1857	1869	1880	1890	1900	1910	1921	1931	1948	1953	1961	1971	1981	1991	2001	2011
0	0	125	165	157	154	0	0	136	162	145	124	103	82	91	81

== See also ==
- Croatia
- Koromačno
- Labinština
- Istria County
- Cerovica (Istria)
- chapels in Istria County
- District of Albona
