= Cerovica (Istria) =

- Municipality
- Interactive map of Cerovica (Istria)
- Coordinates: 45°00′N 14°09′E
- Country: Croatia
- County: Istria
- Municipality: Cerovica (Istria)

The township (Croatian: Cerovica / Italian: Cerovizza) is bordered on the east by the sea of Quarnero from S.Martino to Brovinje; to the North by the Township Chermenizza; and to the East by the Township Croatian: Vlakovo, Istria. The head hamlet of the Township of Cerovica was Croatian: Skitača Italian: Schitazza which is located approximately 4 km north-east of Brovinje. In the hamlet of Skitača is the chapel of Saint Lucy of Albona, which became a parish church for all of the Township of Cerovica. The small chapel was built in 1616 and became a Parish in 1632. The last time it was renovated was in the 1990s.

The township was called Cerovica under the control of both the Republic of Venice and the Austro-Hungarian Empire. It was one of the 12 subdivisions of the District of Albona.

== History ==
From antique times, Albona / Labin, and Fianona / Plomin were two castles that were considered one district. In 1632, the Administrator of Dalmatia and Albania, Antonio Civran, divided the territory of Albona, (L'AlboneseCroatian: Labinština) into 12 fractions. During the Austrian redivision in 1814-1818, they were merged into two larger agricultural municipalities.

== Cerovica in the 1800 ==
Cerovica was one of twelve municipalities in the Labinština peninsula in Istria County, Croatia, during the reign of the Austro-Hungarian Empire. Cerovica is also the name of a small hamlet north of Skitača in the former municipality of Cerovica (Istria). Also called "St.Lucia di Albona," Skitača. The Municipality of Cerovica (Istria) is located in the southern part of the District of Albona, (Istrian Circle) in the most southern township of the Labinstina peninsula. It is made up of eight various hills, some of which are cultivable land. Most of the land was stony and very tough for the settlers when they first cleared it. The settlers lived in small group of houses called hamlets (Croatian: selo or Italian: villa). Cerovica (Istria) borders the Adriatic Sea on its east and southern coasts. To the north is the municipality of Chermanizza (Istria). To the southwest is the municipality of Vlahovo (Istria). There were no roads until 1930–40 in the municipality of Cerovica (Istria). Only small paths (called stasica in Croatian) remain, which people and animals used to go to various places. The cement factory in Koromačno built the road in the 1930s, which is used today to go to Labin and other cities. In 1820, there were 405 people living in the municipality of Cerovica (Istria). The municipality's people owned 107 oxen, 69 cows, and 1,098 sheep. In 1800, there were 86 houses, most of which were made of dry stone walls and straw roofs. Many hamlets grew tremendously during the Austrian occupation. Some people owned more than one house and some as many as four.

=== Hamlets in Cerovica in the 1800 ===
During the Austria-Hungary occupation and re-organization the settlements which belonged to Cerovica with Skitača as the "sotto comune."

Names in 1800	Names today	Names in 1800	Names today
Brovegni	Brovinje	Callioni	?
Bauni	?	Cecuti	?
Stara Polatsa	?	Polesidi	Crni
Buruti	?	GerLatz	?
Vlacichovo	golac	Sikuli	?
Mikalinca	Mikaljini	Prodol	?
Miliwoja	Millevoi	Pribili, Winigrad	?
Dregne	Drenje	Fragnoli	?
Wiscowichi	Ucici	Raune	Ravni
Mikulianski	?	Prodoll	?
Centina	?	Cerovizza	Cerovica
Squaranska	Skvaranska	Principi	?
Lemechi	?	Tomicici	?
Schitazza	Skitača	Curata	?
St.Johan Chapel	Sv.Ivan	Scerna Punta	Crna Punta

=== 1827 census data ===
Males	Females	Families	Dwellings
211	216	99	86

Oxen	Cows	Sheep	Veal	Pigs
130	92	1370	49	50

==== Land classifications ====
	Campi arativi nudi (Bare Arrable Lots)	Campi olivati (Olive Lots)	Campi Vitali (Vines Lots)	Vitali & Olivati (Vines & Olives)	Vitali Semplici (Simple Vines)	Olivati Semplici (Simple Olives)	Prati (Meadows)	Pascoli Nudi (Bare Pastures)	Pascoli Cespuliosi (Bushi fields)	Orti (Gardens)	Boschi (Woods)
Class	3	1	3	3	2	1	1	1	2	1	3

== Chapels in Cerovica ==
These are some of the chapels in the Cerovica in Istria County Croatia.

Name	Description
Santa Lucia d'Albona	Built in 1616, became one of the 12 Labinština Parishes in 1632. In Skitača Istria, Croatia
San Giovanni Battista	12-13 century in Brovinje in Istria County Croatia. A small monastery was part of this country chapel until the middle of the 16th century. The chapel was gifted to the Villa Brovinje in the XIII century
San Giuseppe in Valmazzinghi, Koromačno	Built 20th century in the cement factory in Koromačno, Istria Cpunty Croatia. After the war the bell tower was turn down and the building was made into a cinema, later into a super market
San Martino	In Cerovica (ruins, 18th century). Last service in this country chapel was in 1887. In Cerovica, Istria County Croatia
San Matteo	(Ruins,13 century Under Mt. Babrini just north of Skitača. in the Istria County Croatia
St. Lorenzo in Produbas	Sveti Lovreč Labinski, in Diminići and Kobavici, (17th century)
St Martino di Vettua	North west of Albona, just east of Rasa river. in Istria County Croatia. The Parish was one of the 12 parishes or townships in Labinština which was divided in 1632.
S Nicoló in Drenje	built in 1738 in Drenje, Istria County Croatia

A village is a group of houses in the country, larger than a hamlet and smaller than a town or city. Such a community is usually incorporated as a municipality. There were no villages in the Township of Cerovica in the 1800, only hamlets and small settlements with a few houses. In the hamlet of Prodol there was a coal mine which employed between four and six men daily. The people of the hamlet of Brovinje near the sea were fishermen and farmers. Between 1918 and 1945 the names were changed to Italian. After 1945, the names were changed again, this time to Croatian. Some hamlets joined with other very close hamlets or fractions to form a brand new name, sometimes only one name for the group.

== See also ==
- Brovinje
- Koromačno
- Skitača
- Labinština
- Austria-Hungary
- District of Albona
