= Skitača =

Skitača Schitazza
- Hamlet
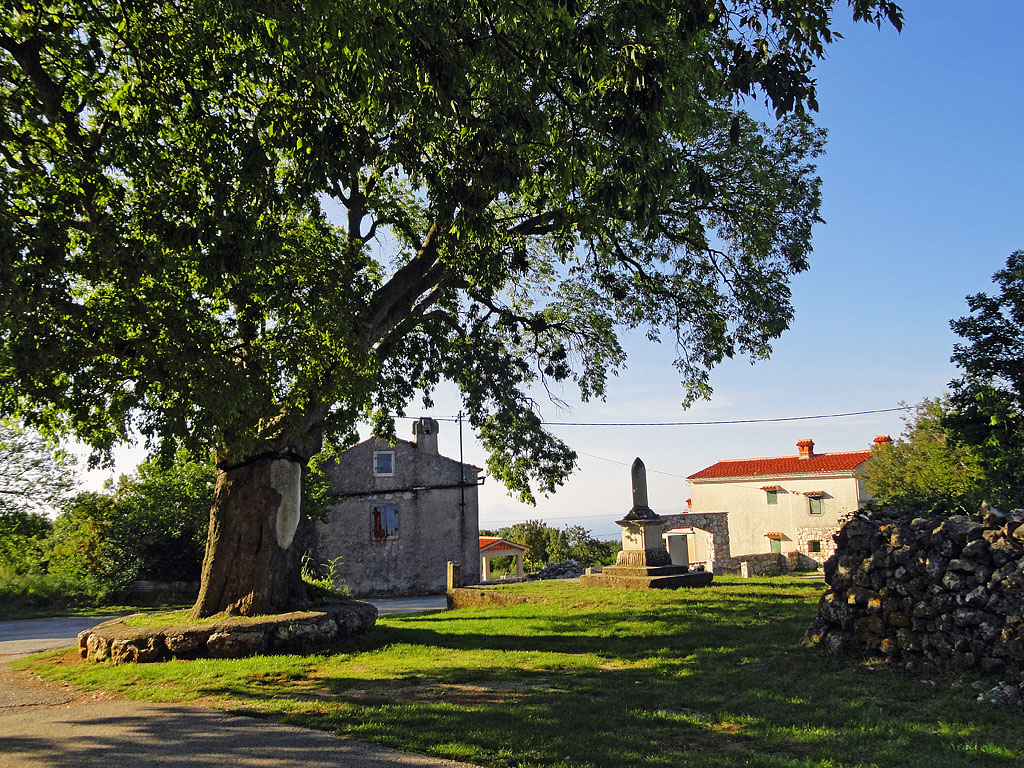
- Skitača village center

- Location within Croatia
- Coordinates: 44°58′59″N 14°8′42″E
- Country: Croatia
- County: Istria County
- Municipality: Raša

Area
  - Total: 3.5 sq mi (9.0 km^{2})

Population (2021)
  - Total: 8
  - Density: 2.3/sq mi (0.89/km^{2})
- Time zone: UTC+1 (CET)
  - Summer (DST): UTC+2 (CEST)
- Postal code: 52222 Koromačno
- Area code: +385 052

Skitača (Italian: Schitazza) is a small hamlet in west Croatia, in the eastern coast of Istria County, and is one of many settlements scattered in the County. These small settlements started to form in the 13-14th century continuing into the 19th century when Napoleon occupied the area. Even later when the Austria-Hungary got this region. During the early centuries most of the people came from the eastern parts of Europe as workers imported by rich landowners. Later, some came as refugees from territories taken by the Tatars and Turkish. Some of people which took refuge were Croats, Montenegrins, Serbs, Romanians, Bosnians, Albanians, Greeks, and other Eastern Europeans.

== Skitača ==
In the Cerovica (Istria) contrada (Parish, Precinct, Country), of the Labinština peninsula, there are many such settlements some of which are now deserted. Skitača is one of these settlements. Croatian: Skitača, Italian: Schitazza is located on the mount by the same name on the Labinština peninsula in Istria County, Croatia. It is located at the highest point of the commune of Albona, about 2 km north-east of the hamlet of Brovinje and 3 km. from the Koromačno cement factory. Skitača overlooks the Kvarner and the island of Cres. During the re-population of Istria, settled people which were called Romanian were brought with other Slavs from the southern provinces of Croatia to reclaim the land which was destroyed by the wars between the Venice Republic and Austria-Hungary. In the village of Skitača north of Italian: Punta Nera or Croatian: Crna Punta there are some which still speak the Istro-Romanian language, although it is now mixed with Croatian language. Today all of the people are gone and new people have started to settle there in the summer months.

== Romanian ==
In a document of Count Giovanni Frangipan, 1465 and 1468, soldiers which were part of the count's army, were called Vlachi, Vlachs in Croatian and Morlacchi in Italian. They were also called Ćići. These people spoke a language Ciribiri which was only spoken by them. They had two dialects, one was Daco-Romanian which was spoken by people who lived in Moldavia, Wallachia and Transylvania, and the other was one actually divided in other two closely related dialects (Aromanian and Megleno-Romanian). The latter was spoken by people that lived in the antique Thrace, Macedonia, and Tessaglia, Tessaly. The Greeks called them Black Vlachs.

The Romeni were descendants of Roman colonists, from the colony of Dacia. In the First century, they were imported by Emperor Trajan and all the following emperors to the borders of various colonies held by the Roman Empire which bordered other Empires. They came from the lower Danube river and were brought to the east of Europe to protect the borders of the Roman Empire. In the county of Istria, the Romanians lived in the following hamlets; Passert, Gradigne (Letaj), Grobnico, Sugnevizza (Šušnjevica), Berdo, Villanova and Jessenovizza, Jesenovik, in the superior Val d'arsa. In the peninsula Albonese Labinština they lived in Skitača, and in the Val d'arsa they lived in Cherbune, Tupliaco, Scopliaco and Pedena, Padna. They mixed their language with the Croat language which was called the Istro-Romanian language. Eventually they became integrated with the Slavs, thus speaking only the Croatian language. Skitača hamlet was named after people who braided their hair into a pigtail, Kita meaning pigtail in the local Croatian dialects. Another meaning is wanderer or vagabond. In Italian razza means race. Schitazza means the race of people with pigtails who lived in this village. Today Skitača is almost deserted, but since the area was discovered by tourists there are people who live in the village for most of the summer.

== Hamlets in the Val d'Arsa where the Romani lived ==
OLD NAME	NEW NAME	LOCATION
Schitazza	Skitača	Near Koromačno e Brovinje
Scopliaco	Škopljak	East of Pazin
Cherbune	Krbune	east of Skopljak
Gradigne	Gradinje	South of Paz
Grobenico	Grobnik	South of Paz
Berdo	Berg Vrh	South of Letaj
Jessenovizza	Jesenovik	NE of Lake Čepić
Tupliaco	Tupiljak	East of Lake Čepić
Xeiane(Castelnuovo)	?	
Pedena	Padna	South of Scopliak
Villanova	?	
Susgnevizza	Šušnjevica	Between Kršan and Vozilići
Letoj	Letai	South of Paz
Passert	?	In the municipality of Cerovlje

== St. Lucia d'Albona ==
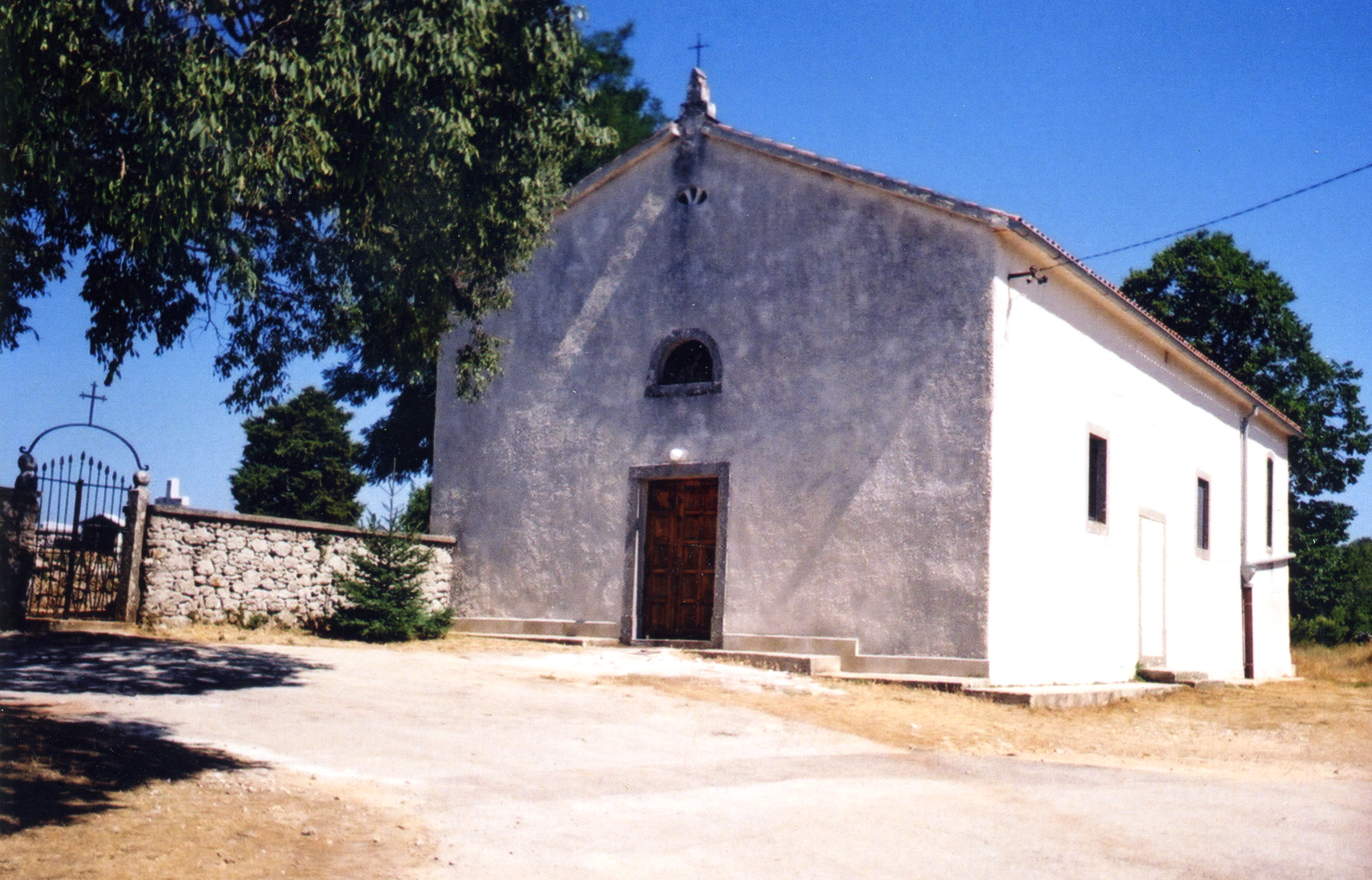
St Lucia church, in Skitača001

In 1616 the people of Skitača built a chapel which they named St. Lucia (delle lagrime), meaning St. Lucia of the tears. In 1632 the chapel became a Parish and the head of the Township of Cerovica, also called St Lucia in Schitazza under the Venice Republic.

During the Austria-Hungary occupation 1799 to 1918 Skitača was also the head of the Comune of Cerovica. There is a local legend of why the people built the chapel. The local children went to the local spring to get water and when they got there they saw a beautiful young woman sitting by the spring crying. The children asked the young woman why she was crying. She responded that in Skitača there was no church, so the children went to the towns people and told them the story. The people built the chapel and later upgraded it until it became a church with two bells on the roof tower. Because they saw the young woman crying they guessed that it was St.Lucia because there is still a spring on the spot where she was crying. The story is told that a very rich couple had a beautiful daughter. The couple brought this girl up as a Christian and when she was old enough she gave herself to God. The parents wanted her to marry a rich young man but she refused. She met another young man who was a Pagan and she taught him about God, and although she was told that she must not see him again she continued to meet him. Her eyes were taken out so she could not see him anymore. The empty eye sockets were filled with glass eyes which produced tears. She was killed because she refused to obey the law in Syracuse, Sicily. This is how she is known as St. Lucia of the tears. The Venice Republic ceased to exist in 1799, as Napoleon Bonaparte made his way through Europe. Later some of the territories conquered by the French were given to the Austria-Hungary Empire. These territories were called the Austria Provinces of the Littoral and were divided into political sections known as: Province of the Littoral, Economic Circulatory #XII, Circle of Istria, Austrian Circle and the local area called Labinština was named District of Albona. The new government in the beginning of the 1800s started to divide the County into smaller fractions known as Municipita or Townships. The Labinština was divided into 12 fractions. Under the Venice Republic there were only 4 sottocomuni or townships in the Labinština. Each Township had a headquarter where legal business was done away from the Istria County capital of Albona. The District Capocomune was Albona. The Township of Cerovica capital was Skitaca until 1918 when the Austrian-Hungary Empire ceased to exist.

== See also ==
- Istria County
- Brovinje
- Koromačno
- Labinština
- Cerovica (Istria)
- List of German exonyms for places in Croatia
- chapels in Istria County

== Gallery ==
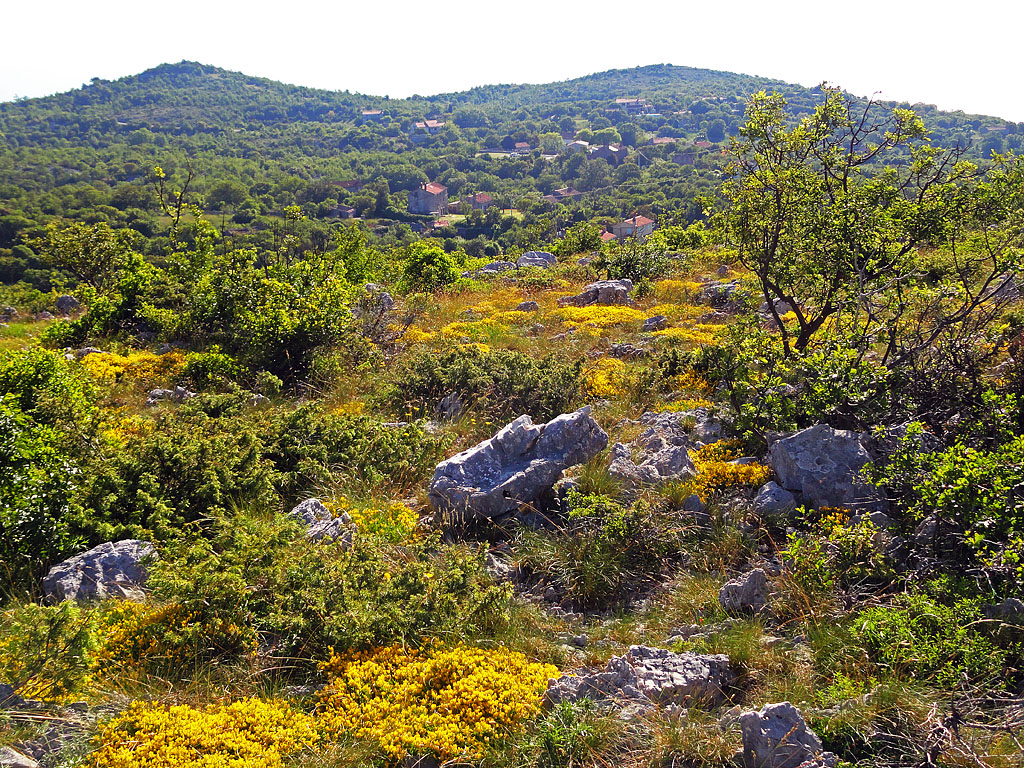
Scattered houses

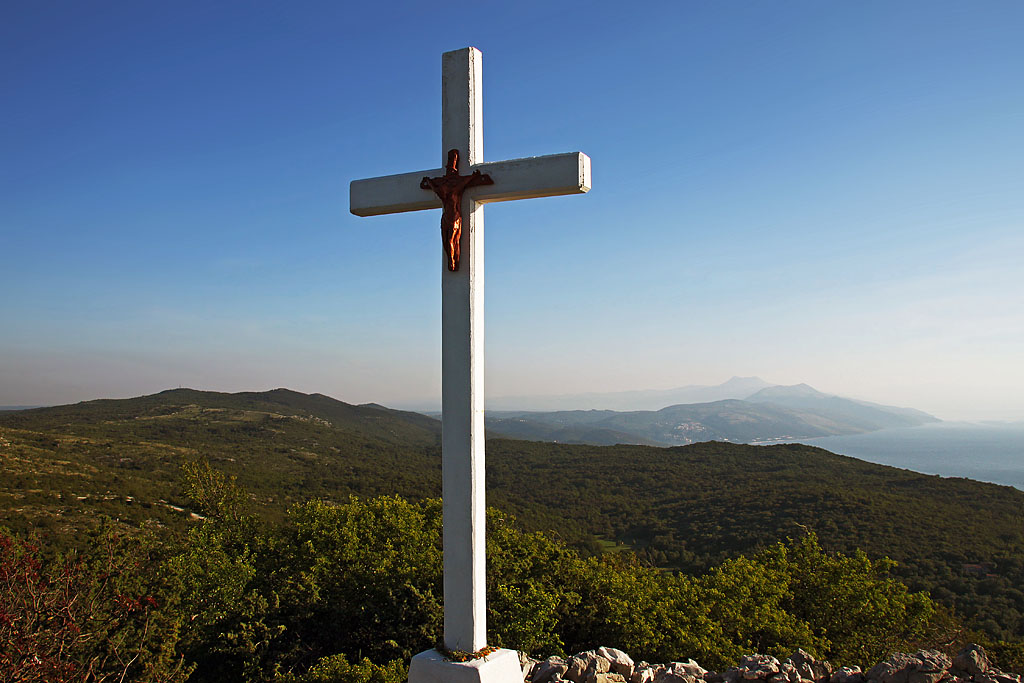
Orlec summit above Skitača

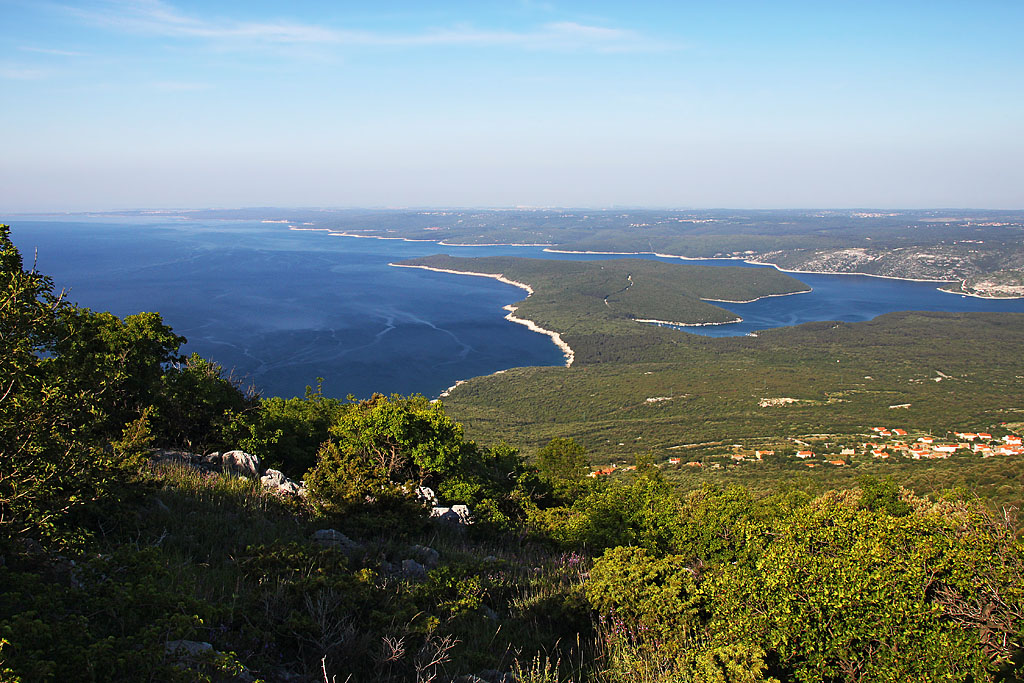
Near Santa Lucia delle lacrime
