= St. Lorenzo in Produbas =

Hamlet in Istria County, Croatia

San Lorenzo di Albona Parish
- Sv Lovrec Labinski
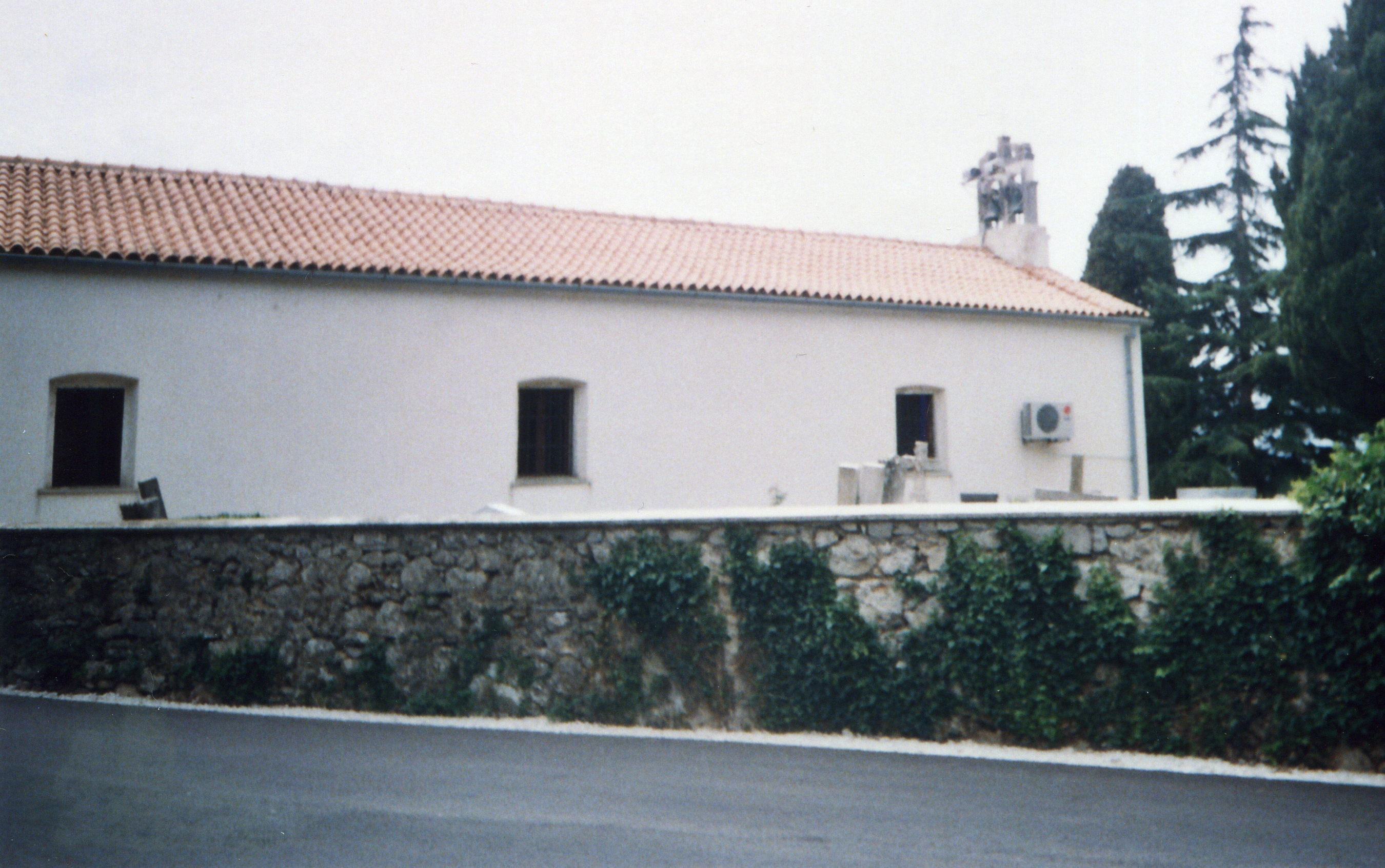

Religion
- Affiliation: Catholic
- Year consecrated: 1608
- Status: parish

Location
- Municipality: Rasa, Istria
- Country: Croatia
- Interactive map of San Lorenzo di Albona Parish
- Coordinates: 44.991°N 14.1027°E

The chapel and parish named St. Lorenzo in Produbas is located in a hamlet of St Lorenzo d'Albona in Istria County, Croatia. The hamlet of St Lorenzo d'Albona (in Italian), Sv Lovreč Labinski (in Croatian) consists of two small settlements, Diminići (in Croatian) and Kobavići (in Croatian), which are located south of Albona (in Italian)or Labin (in Croatian). St Lorenzo in Prodibas was one of the 12 townships which divided the Agro Albonese (in Italian), Labinština (in Croatian) into 12 Parishes or Župa (in Croatian) or 12 Comuni (in Italian) or Municipality in 1632. Today this chapel is called St Lorenzo di Albona or Sv Lovreč Labinski. The chapel was built in 1608. and became a Parish in 1632. In the front of the chapel there are two plaques or epigraphs in Latin writing explaining the year it was built. The altar was crafted in Dubasnica, a hamlet on the Island of Veglia (in Italian)/Krk (in Croatian)located near Fiume (in Italian)/Rijeka (in Croatian)Istria, Croatia, in the bay of Kvarner (in Croatian)/Quarnero (in Italian), northern Adriatic gulf, and near the neighboring island of Cres (in Croatian)/Cherso (in Italian)in northern Croatia. The altar was donated by a priest, Martin Viscović in 1663.
