= Marceljani =

Marceljani Marcegliani
- Village
- Location within Croatia
- Country: Croatia
- County: Istria County
- Municipality: Labin

Area
  - Total: 0.97 sq mi (2.5 km^{2})
- Elevation: 790 ft (240 m)

Population (2021)
  - Total: 191
  - Density: 200/sq mi (76/km^{2})
- Time zone: UTC+1 (CET)
  - Summer (DST): UTC+2 (CEST)
- Postal code: 52220 Labin
- Area code: 052

Marceljani (Italian: Marcegliani) is a village in the Labin-Albona municipality in Istria County, Croatia. It is part of the Labinština peninsula in Istria.

== Location ==
The village is located about 3 km from the center of the town of Labin and about 8 km from Rabac, Istria in the east. In recent times, since the formation of Croatia, the village was renamed Marceljani (even Marčeljani).

== Demographics ==
According to the 2021 census, its population was 191.

The settlement was formerly part of the Municipality of Sveta Nedelja. The population was 192 in 2011. At the census of 2001, Marciljani had 161 inhabitants. In 1991, the village counted 170 inhabitants. From this 33.5% were Croats, 3.5% Serbs, 0.6% Muslims and 62.3% other (at the time they were mostly regionally committed, as Istrians).

== Economy ==
Marciljani is home to a few private concerns in the fields of private tourist facilities, carpentry, and a dental laboratory.
