= Dobro (Istria) =

Dobro is a small fraction settlement and is walking distance with the hamlet-port of Koromačno in Istria County, Croatia. It consists of apartments buildings which were used by workers of the nearby cement factory. The name was taken from the antique map (1800) which shows Dobro, Priponje,(not developed) and Punta Kromatz (became hamlet-port Koromačno and the cement factory. To the east is Punta Nera and to the west is Vlahovo. (Punta nera is not developed). Koromačno is the coastal hamlet, built around 1930, with a port for ships which deliver supplies and which the cement factory export the cement by sea to be packaged elsewhere.

== Note on Dobra, Istria ==
Maps of the French cadastre on 2010 State Archives of Trieste This is the Map of the area showing where Dobro is actually. Spelling of "Dobro" is in German. Austria-Hungary was in control at those times.

== See also ==
- Koromačno
- Cement Plants located in Croatia
