= St. Lucia d'Albona =

Church in Skitača, Croatia

Santa Lucia d'Albona Parish
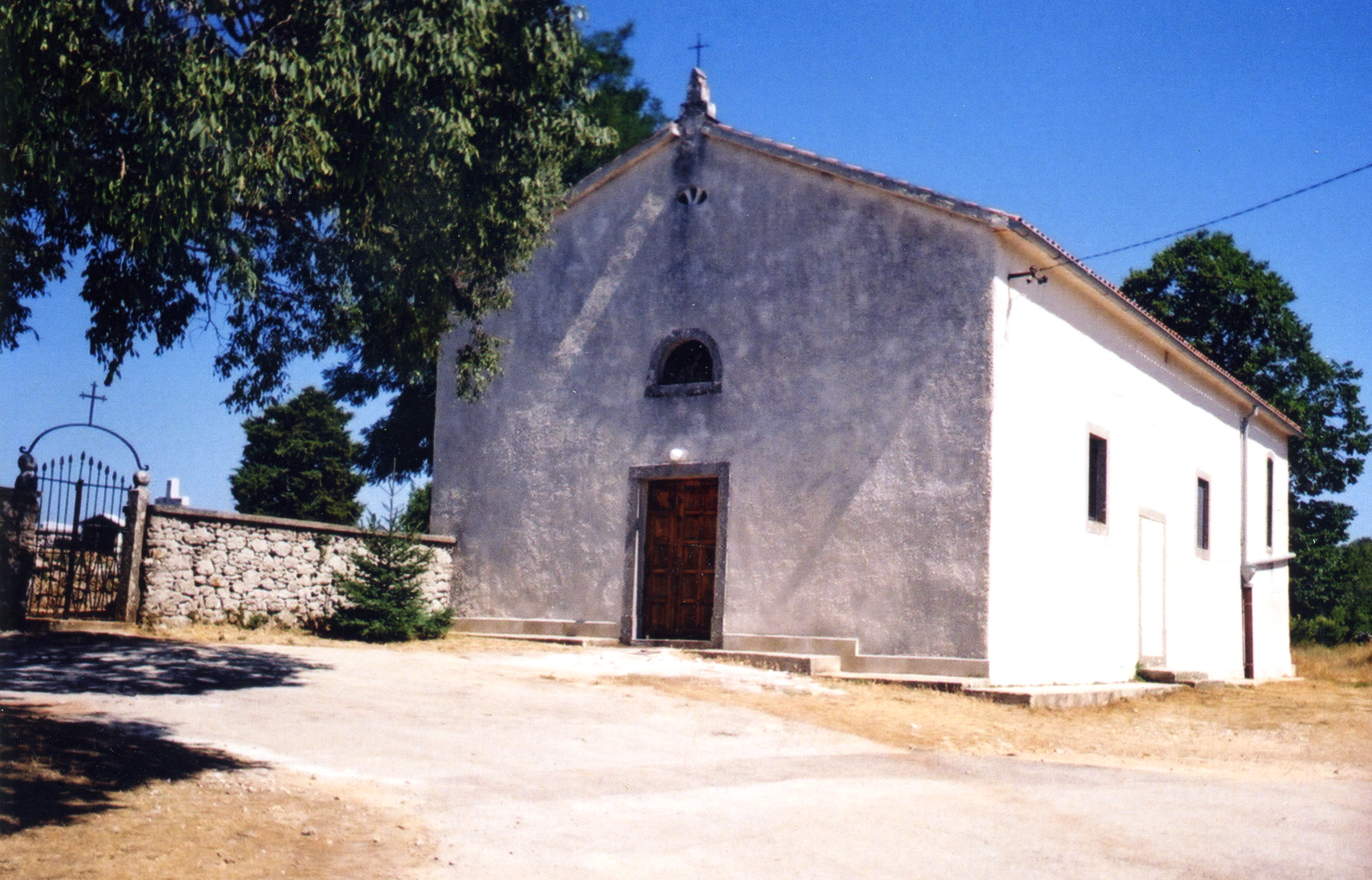
- Santa Lucia d'Albona Parish

Religion
- Affiliation: Catholic
- Year consecrated: 1616

Location
- Municipality: Rasa, Istria Croatia
- Interactive map of Santa Lucia d'Albona Parish
- Coordinates: 44.98339°N 14.14520°E

St. Lucia d'Albona (Italian: Santa Lucia, Croatian: Sveta Lucija) is a small church (on the basis of a big chapel) in the hamlet of Skitaca, Istria County Croatia.

The chapel was named after the patron saint of Syracuse, Sicily, Santa Lucia or Saint Lucy. In 1632, it became the branch parish of the township of Cerovica in the Labinstina peninsula in Istria.

This chapel was built in 1616 and became a parish in 1632. In 1924 it was extended on the opposite (west) side of the bell tower. A door was also placed on the west side overlooking the cemetery. The church has three altars; the main one, Santa Lucia, and St Anthony.

The holiday of St Lucia is on December 13 and it was a big day for merchants and people who joined in the celebration of this saint.
