= Diminići =

Diminići Diminici, Villa Diminici
- Settlement
- Location of Labin within Croatia
- Coordinates: 44°59′20″N 14°06′05″E
- Country: Croatia
- County: Istria
- Municipality: Raša

Diminići (Italian: Diminici or Villa Diminici) is a small settlement in the Labinština peninsula in Istria County, Croatia. This settlement is grouped with Kobavići and is known as Sveti Lovreč Labinski /San Lorenzo di Albona/ Sveti Lovreč Labinski. This settlement belongs to the Raša Municipality, Croatia. It is located just south of Sveti Lovreč Labinski.

== See also ==
- Sveti Lovreč Labinski
- Kobavići
- Labinština
