= Valica =

Valica Valizza
- Village
- Location within Croatia
- Coordinates: 45°27′58″N 13°34′16″E
- Country: Croatia
- County: Istria County
- Municipality: Umag

Area
  - Total: 1.9 sq mi (5.0 km^{2})

Population (2021)
  - Total: 252
  - Density: 130/sq mi (50/km^{2})
- Time zone: UTC+1 (CET)
  - Summer (DST): UTC+2 (CEST)
- Postal code: 52470 Umag
- Area code: 052

Valica (Italian: Valizza) is a village in Umag municipality in Istria County, Croatia.

== Demographics ==
According to the 2021 census, its population was 252. It was 213 in 2001.
