= Kobavići =

Settlement in Istria County, Croatia

Kobavici is a small settlement in the Labinstina peninsula in Istria County, Croatia. Kobavici is grouped with a few other settlements and is known as Sveti Lovrec Labinski.The name of the settlement was named after the first settlers, Kobavici

== See also ==
Labinstina
