= Viškovići =

Viškovići Viscovici
- Village
- Location within Croatia
- Coordinates: 44°58′59″N 14°6′50″E
- Country: Croatia
- County: Istria County
- Municipality: Raša

Area
  - Total: 0.58 sq mi (1.5 km^{2})

Population (2021)
  - Total: 129
  - Density: 220/sq mi (86/km^{2})
- Time zone: UTC+1 (CET)
  - Summer (DST): UTC+2 (CEST)
- Postal code: 52222 Koromačno
- Area code: 052

Viškovići (Italian: Viscovici) is a small hamlet in the south eastern Labinština peninsula in Istria County, Croatia.

== Demographics ==
According to the 2021 census, its population was 129. The total population was 171 persons and 109 houses in 2011.
