= Škopljak =

Village in Istria, Croatia

Škopljak Scopliaco
- Village
- Location within Croatia
- Coordinates: 45°13′42″N 14°01′46″E
- Country: Croatia
- County: Istria County
- Municipality: Gračišće

Area
  - Total: 1.2 sq mi (3.2 km^{2})

Population (2021)
  - Total: 45
  - Density: 36/sq mi (14/km^{2})
- Time zone: UTC+1 (CET)
  - Summer (DST): UTC+2 (CEST)
- Postal code: 52403 Gračišće
- Area code: 052

Škopljak (Italian: Scopliaco) is a village in the municipality of Gračišće in Istria, Croatia.

== Demographics ==
According to the 2021 census, its population was 45.

According to the 2001 Croatian census, the village had 71 inhabitants and 21 family households.
