= District of Albona =

The District of Albona (Italian: Distretto di Albona) was one of many Districts which were named in Istria County, Croatia. A District is one of the lowest Administrative Division that, in some countries and at various historic times, was managed by the local government, and such was Albona. District in Italian "Distretto" is also called by other names; Quartiere (Neighborhood), Circondario (District), Provincia (Province), Circonscrizione (Circumscription, Circuit, Precinct, County), Regione (Region), Rione (District), Dipartimento (Department), it is a division of something greater.

== History ==
The ancient Greeks founded many colonies in the Adriatic and the Mediterranean Sea coasts. They built small colony settlements by the coasts, one of which is known as Rabac or Old Albona. Later they started to build small castles on hills. One of these was Albona.

The Greeks called it Aloun. In the Tabula Peutingeriana, Plinio and Tolomeo called it Alvona. In 250 AD the Arab geographer Edrisi called it Albunh which means populated city. The 10th century the Byzantine Eastern Roman Emperor Constantine VII Porphyrogenitus in his De Administrando Imperio named Albona as "Castron Albonos". The Greek word "acropolis" means city on a hill.

Albona is 315 meters high from the sea level and was called hill fort or "castors" or "castrum" in Latin. Before the Romans conquered it in 2nd century BC, Albona was a Liburnian castle.

Albona is situated in an "isthmus", which is a narrow strip of land with water on each side forming a link between two large areas of land, The Arsa river is on the west side and the Gulf of Quarnero is on the est side. In ancient times Albona, was also called an Insula, which means island in Latin. A self governed city was called Insula. also a community of buildings surrounded by a highway was also called "insula". When Albona was under the Venice it was indicated as "terra" or territory, and was divided into three "Contrade" or Districts; Gorizza, Dolizza, and Cragn.

== Regio X Venetia et Histria ==
In 173 under Marcus Aurelius was created "Practntura Italiae et Alpinunum" which included Istria and Liburnia. Albona was elevated to "Res Publica" or State. In 7BC, Augustus divided Italy into 11 Regions; I Latuum et Campania, II Apulia et Calabria, III Lacania et Bruttium, IV Smnium, V Picenum, VI Umbria et Ager Gallicus, VII Etruria, Viii Aemilia, IX Liguria, X Venetia et Histria, XI Transpadena. Under Emperor Antoninus Pius they created the military Region "Praefecturae Italiae et Alpinum" which included Itria and all of the Liburia. Istria was governed by two governors or magistrates in charge of the military and civilian judicial affairs of the territory. This territory became the "X Reggio" or ==Decima Regio== Tenth Region of Italy. The X Regio, Triveneto was divided into 17 "Compartments" or Provinces of the Administration division of the Empire, or Territory, Region, Canton, District, and was called "Venetia et Histria" in Latin. The territory was also called "Triveneto" or Three Venice; Venezia Eugenia, Venezia Giulia, Venezia Tridentina.

Reggio X

"triveneto"

The 17 Compartments or Provinces; Belluno, Balzano, Gorizia, Padua, Pordenone, Rovigno, Trieste, Treviso, Albona, Fianona, Udine, Verona, Vicenza, Pula, Fiume. The three Secular Regions of Trentino-Alto Adige, Friuli-Venezia Giulia, and Veneto had four Provinces; Gorizia, Trento, Udine, Venice. The Dioceses formed the intermediate level of government over the Provinces, grouped regionally. After 325 these regional groupings were part of one of three territorialized "Praetorian Prefecture". Vicars were in charge of the Dioceses and were under the control of the Praefector. These Dioceses were tax collection districts and were called Parishes. In 344 the Byzantine Emperor of the Eastern Roman Empire Constantine VII divided the Empire into four "Prefectures" headed by a magistrate or regional Governor, and each subdivision into Dioceses headed by Vicars or Vice-Prefects. The Dioceses were large regional judicial districts of the Roman Empire.

== Holy Roman Empire ==
The Holy Roman Empire was founded in 1512 and it ended in 1806 after Napoleon conquered most of Europe. Geographically it was called the Imperial circle. All of the European countries which were part of the Empire were called Circles. Each Circle was further divided into Regions, Provinces, Districts, which were also called Circles. The Imperial Circle; Austrian, Bavarian, Burgundian, Electoral Rhenish, Franconin, Westpolian, Lower Saxon, Swabbian, Upper Saxon. The Austrian Circle; An der Etsch, Austria, Austrian, Brixen, Carinthia, Carniola, Chur, Gorizia, Istria, Stiria, Tarasp, Trent, Trieste, Tyrol. The Istrian Circle was divided into Districts; Bellai, Buie, Albona, Capodistria, Cherso, Dignano, Lussino, Montona, Parenzo, Pisino, Rovigno, Pola, veglia, Volosca. In 1632, Antonio Civran, Administrator of Dalmatia and Albania divided the District of Albona into 12 external sub-districts called Parishes;Albona, Fianona, Rippend, S.Domenica, Dubrova. Vettua, Cere, Cugn, Bergod, Chermenizza, Vlakovo, Cerovica.

Map of the Imperial Circles (1560)-en

== Cisalpine Republic ==
In 1796 in the repartition of the Napoleonic Empire, the Cisalpine Republic and Maritime Austria were formed and divided into 20 Departments; Olone, Verbano, Lario, DelleMontagne, Tessino, Adda, Serio, Mella, Benaco, Upper Po, Miuccio, Crostolo, Apennines, Panaro, Reno, Upper Padua, Lower Po, Lamone, Rubicon., In 1797 France treaty gave Istria to Austria. In 1805 in another treaty gave Istria to the Kingdom of Italy. Istria was divided into six Cantoni or Districts; Capodistria, Pirano, Parenzo, Rovigno, Dignano, Albona. In 1809 Istria went to France. In 1815 Istria became a possession of Austria. In 1861 Istria was under Austria-Hungary until 1918. After ww2 Istria was assigned to Yugoslavia.

== Maritime Austria ==
Maritime Austria consisted of all the coastal land of the Adriatic sea from Venice to Albania, including the islands which belonged to the Venice Republic before 1796. The new Provinces of the Maritime Austria; Venice and Isles, Dogado of Venice, Padua, Rovigno, Verona, Vicenza, Trevisana, Friuli, Istria, Dalmatia. four Islands of Quarnero, three Islands of Dalmatia, Morlachia, Albania, Montenegro.

== Province of Istria ==
The Province of Istria was divided into four Bishoprics and 18 Districts or Territories, six large and twelve small. Districts of the Province of Istria; Capodistria, Muggia, Pirano, Umago, Citta Nuova, Parenzo, S.Lorenzo, Rovigno, Pola, Dignano, Valle, Albona, Montona, Grisignona, Portole, Buie, Raspo, S.Vincenti. In the redivision of which Austria decided in 1814–1818, the District of Albona, which consisted of two castles Albona and Fianona were made into two separate districts. District of Fianona had six sub-districts; Cere, Kugn, S.Domenica, Dubrova, Rippenda, and Vettue. District of Albona had four sub-districts; Chermenizza, Bergod, Vlakovo and Cerovica. The sub-district of Bersez was added later.

== See also ==
- Imperial Circle
- Austrian Circle
- Littoral
- Republic of Venice
- Triveneto
