= Vlakovo =

- Village
- Location within Bosnia and Herzegovina
- Coordinates: 43°52′35″N 18°14′24″E
- Country: Bosnia and Herzegovina
- Entity: Federation of Bosnia and Herzegovina
- Canton: Sarajevo
- Municipality: Ilidža

Area
  - Total: 1.30 sq mi (3.37 km^{2})

Population (2013)
  - Total: 3
  - Density: 2.3/sq mi (0.89/km^{2})
- Time zone: UTC+1 (CET)
  - Summer (DST): UTC+2 (CEST)

Vlakovo is a village in Bosnia and Herzegovina. According to the 1991 census, the village is located in the municipality of Ilidža.

== Demographics ==
According to the 2013 census, its population was 3, all Bosniaks.
