= Vlakovo, Istria =

Croatian: Vlakovo / Italian: Vlacovi is a small hamlet in the Labinština peninsula in Istria County, Croatia. The people which named Vlakovo are named as Vlačić, Diminić, Višković, and Kobavić. In 1902, the first school called "Sveti Lovreč elementary school" opened in Vlakovo.
