= Dubrova, Croatia =

Dubrova
- Hamlet
- Location Dubrova
- Coordinates: 45°07′12″N 14°7′12″E
- Country: Croatia
- County: Istria County
- Municipality: Labin

Dubrova is a small hamlet north of Labin in Istria County, Croatia. There in the hamlet was the large estate of the Baron Lazzarini. To the north a larger settlement called stermatz (Strmac) and to the south Stari-Grad.
