= Plomin =

Plomin Fianona
- Village
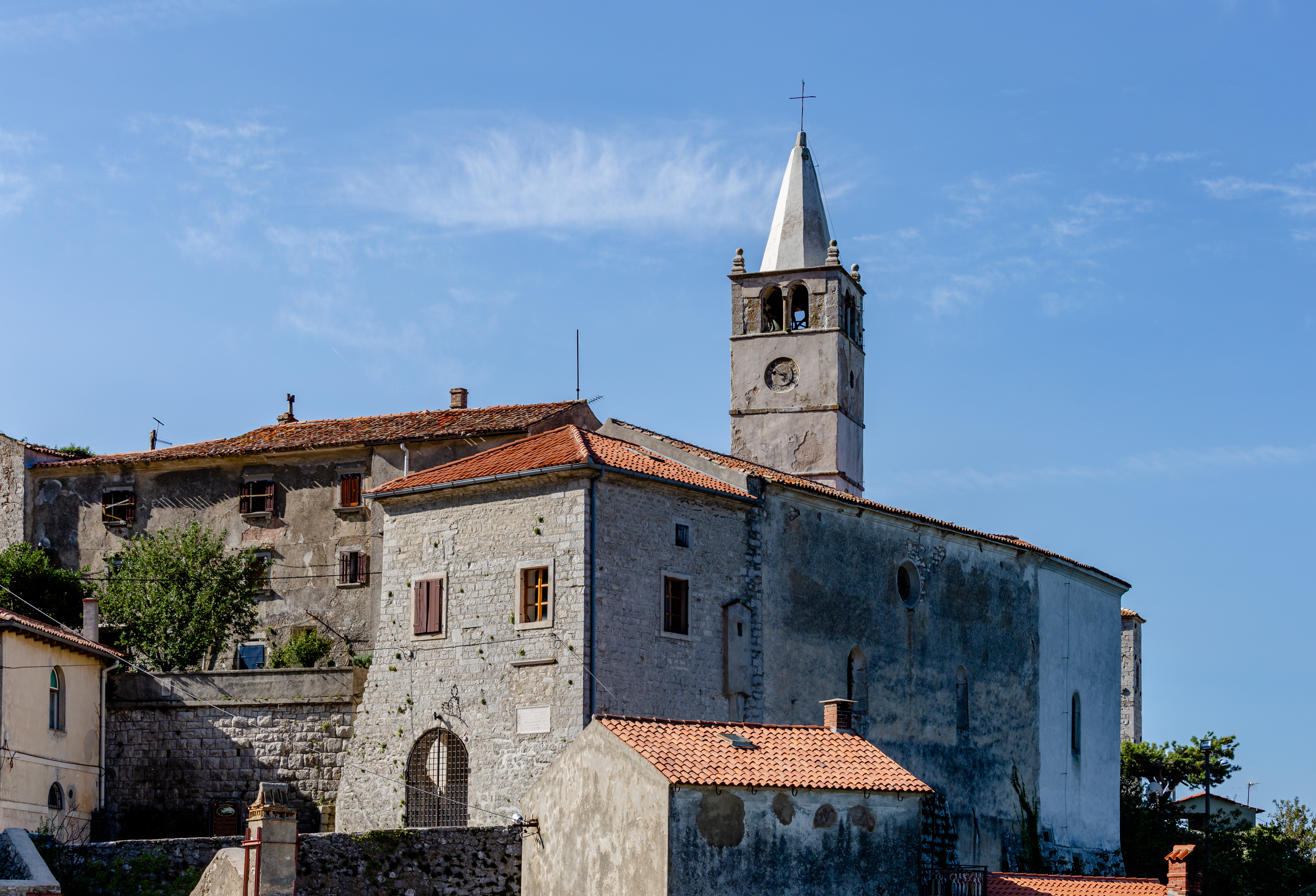
- Plomin

- Location within Croatia
- Country: Croatia
- County: Istria County
- Municipality: Kršan

Area
  - Total: 1.7 sq mi (4.3 km^{2})

Population (2021)
  - Total: 96
  - Density: 58/sq mi (22/km^{2})
- Time zone: UTC+1 (CET)
  - Summer (DST): UTC+2 (CEST)
- Postal code: 52234 Plomin
- Area code: 052

Plomin (Italian: Fianona) is a village in Kršan municipality in Istria County, Croatia, situated approximately 11 km north of Labin, on a hill 80 meters tall. It is a popular destination for tourists traveling through Istria by road.

== History ==
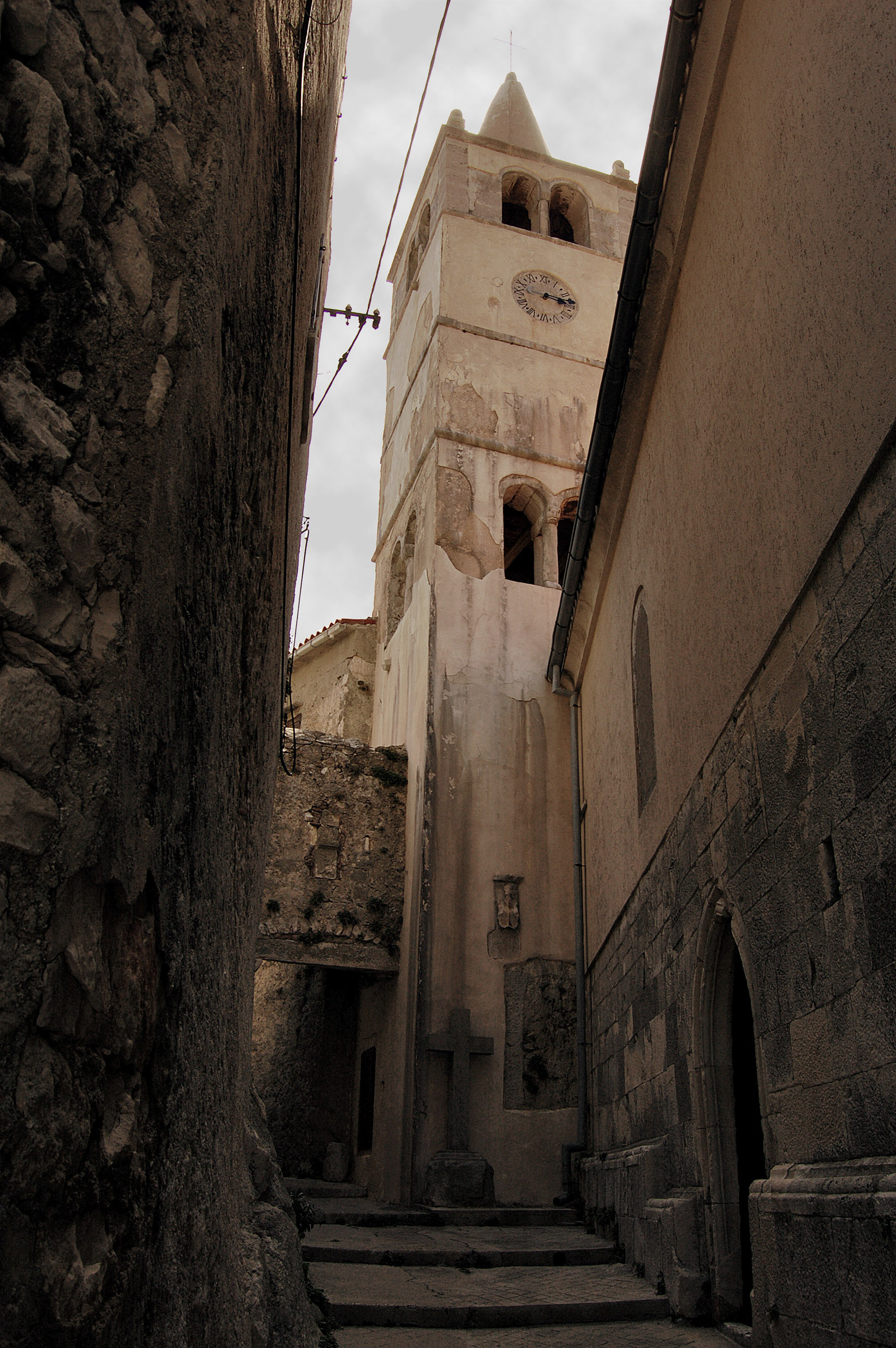
St George the Elder

Originally named Flanona, the settlement was inhabited by the Illyrian Liburnians built in Roman times, above the bay bearing the same name. Plomin was abandoned after World War II, due to the bay becoming too muddy and its inhabitants, mostly Italians, emigrating to Italy. However, it has since been repopulated, and is today home to approximately 130 people. The buildings in the town are several hundred years old, built on the ruins of the original Roman houses. The walls date back to the 9th century.

Plomin contains two churches, St George the Elder and St George the Younger. Both contain Christian art. St. George the Elder contains Plomin tablet as a part of the outer wall, an 11th-century religious text written in the Glagolitic alphabet, the oldest known Slavic alphabet.

== Demographics ==
According to the 2021 census, its population was 96.
