= Sveti Lovreč Labinski =

Sveti Lovreč Labinski St. Lorenzo di Albona
- Village
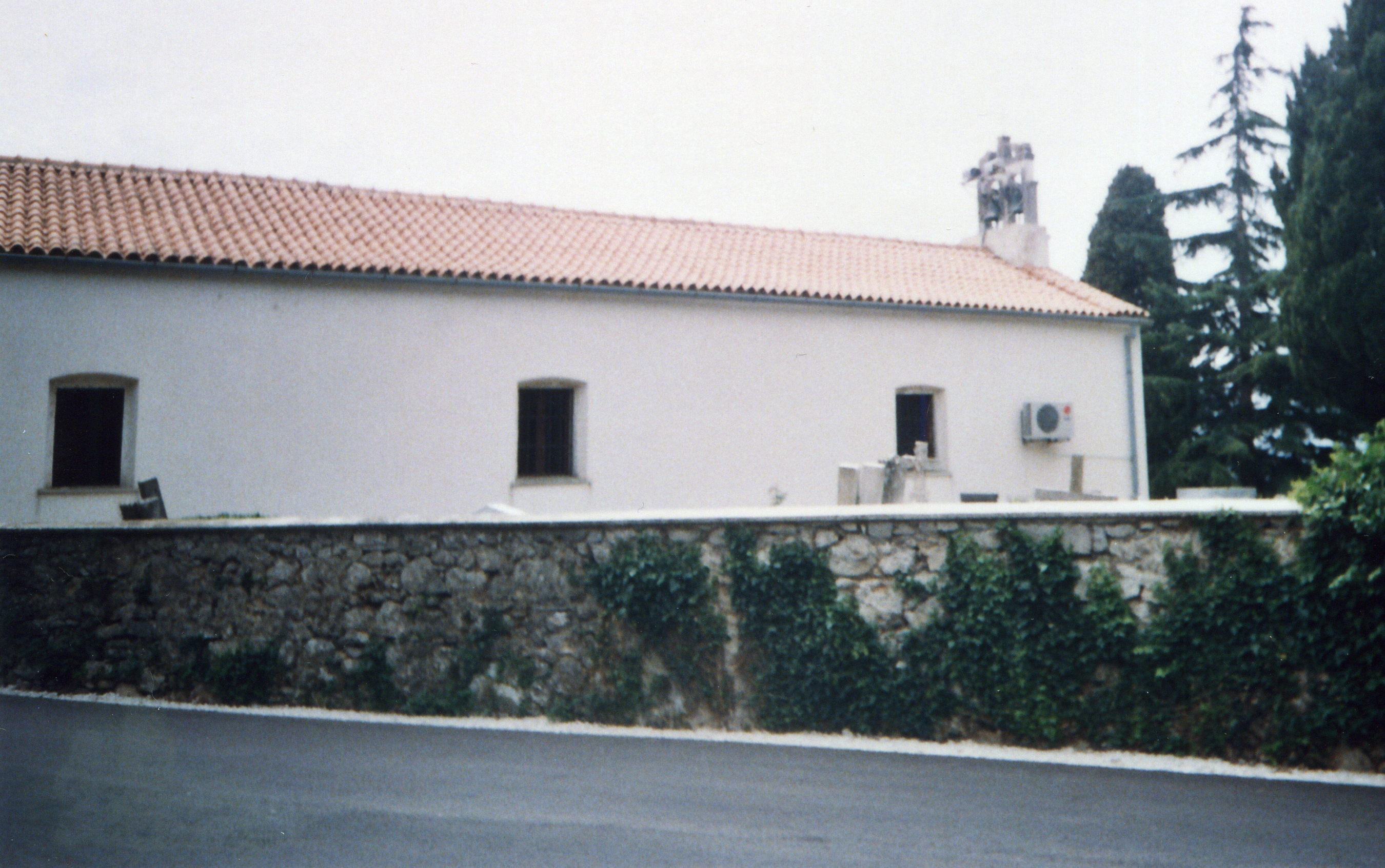

- Location within Croatia
- Coordinates: 44.991°N 14.1027°E
- Country: Croatia
- County: Istria County
- Municipality: Raša

Area
  - Total: 2.9 sq mi (7.5 km^{2})

Population (2021)
  - Total: 41
  - Density: 14/sq mi (5.5/km^{2})
- Time zone: UTC+1 (CET)
  - Summer (DST): UTC+2 (CEST)
- Postal code: 52220 Labin
- Area code: 052

Sveti Lovreč Labinski (Croatian: Sv. Lovreċ Labinski / Italian: St.Lorenzo di Albona) is a small hamlet in Raša municipality, Istria County, Croatia. The church, built in the early 17th century, is also the Parish church and has the same name as the hamlet. During the Austria-Hungary occupation, it belonged to the municipality of Vlahovo, just west of the Municipality of Cerovica.

The hamlet includes two small settlements to the south, Diminići and Kobaviči, which, in the custom of the time, were named for the families who settled them.

In the mid-17th century, Sveti Lovreč had 32 houses.

== Demographics ==
According to the 2021 census, its population was 41. The population of St. Lovreć Labinski in 2011 was 55.

== See also ==
- List of Italian exonyms in Istria
