= Labinština =

Eastern region of Istria in Europe

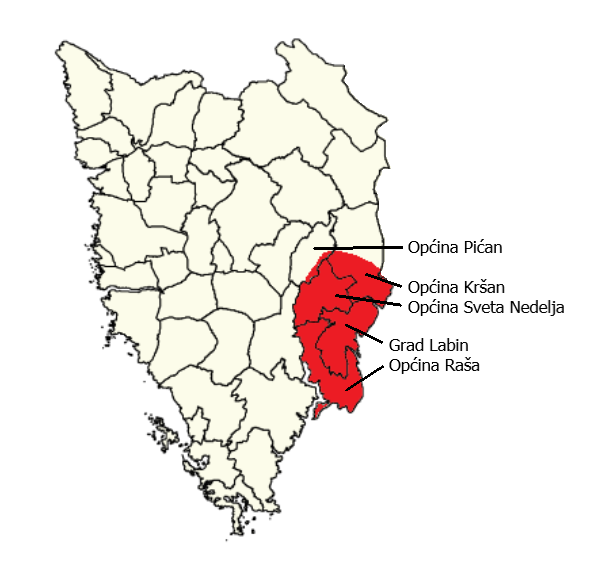
Map of Labinština within Istria County

Labinština (Croatian: Labinšćina / Labinština, Italian: L'Albonese / Agro Albonese) is the geographical and historical name of the eastern part of Istria county in Croatia. It covers an area of approximately 220 km2 that is 25 km long and 13 km wide. Geographical borders in the west are the Raša river, and a bay of the same name, in the south and east, the sea, and in the north, Plomin Bay, the southern part of the Učka massif and Kvarner Bay, and, until the beginning of the 20th century, Lake Čepić (Čepić basin). The center is Labin after which it is named. Labin was the head township of the Labinština or Agro Albonese under the Roman Empire, during the Venice Republic between 1365 and 1797, the Austrian rule between 1814-1918 and many other occupations by foreign armies.

== History ==
Historical affiliations
Year	Country
9th or 5th century BC-177 BC	Liburnia
177 BC-476	Roman Republic/Empire
476-489	Kingdom of Italy (Odoacer)
489-538	Kingdom of Italy (Ostrogoths)
538-788	Eastern Roman Empire
789-843	Kingdom of the Franks
843-855	Kingdom of Middle Francia
856-962	Kingdom of Italy (Franks), HRE
962-1040	Duchy of Carinthia, HRE
1040-1173	Duchy of Bavaria, HRE
1173-1209	Duchy of Merania, HRE
1209-1420	Patriarchate of Aquileia, HRE
1420-1797	Republic of Venice
1797-1805	Archduchy of Austria
1805-1810	Kingdom of Italy (Napoleonic)
1810-1815	Illyrian Provinces (France)
1815-1867	Austrian Empire
1867-1918	Austria-Hungary
1918-1943	Kingdom of Italy
1943-1945	Italian Social Republic / OZAK
1945-1991	Croatia, Yugoslavia
1991–present	Republic of Croatia, EU (2013-)

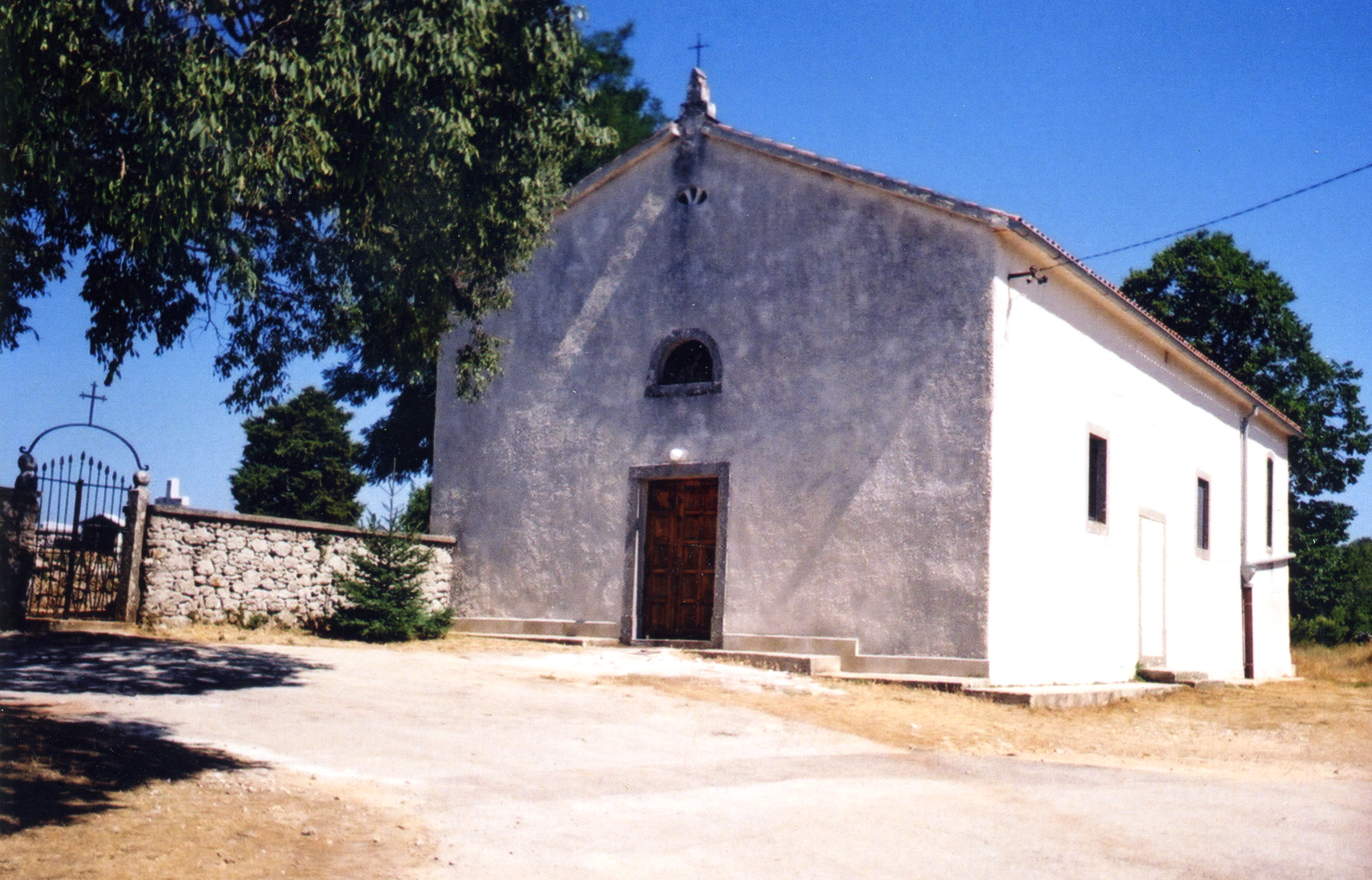
St Lucia church in Skitaca built in 1616

=== Ancient period ===
In ancient times it was the western border of the Liburnians, and the major settlements were Alvona (Labin) and Flanona (Plomin).

The ancient Greeks founded many colonies in the Adriatic and the Mediterranean Sea coasts. They built small colony settlements by the coasts, one of which is known as Rabac or Old Albona. Later they started to build small castles on hills. One of these was Labin.

The Greeks called it Aloun. In the Tabula Peutingeriana, Plinio and Tolomeo called it Alvona. In 250 AD the Arab geographer Edrisi called it Albunh which means populated city. The Greek word "acropolis" means city on a hill.

Labin is 315 meters high from the sea level and was called hill fort or "castors" or "castrum" in Latin. Before the Romans conquered it in 2nd century BC, Albona was a Liburnian castle.

In the first half of the XIV century the Patriarch of Aquileia ordered a statute for the city of Albona. Published in 1341, included in it was the description of the borders of its territory. The Signore Tommasso Luciani, a native from Albona, contributed a copy of the book to the magazine L'Istria. After translating from Latin to Italian, it was noted in the weekly L'Istria the Latin word "Insulae" means Island. Since there were no islands in the territory they started to research. It seems during the Roman Empire, the word Insulae or Island, was used to specify a municipality or commune with its own government in the Roman world. Also it said that a city, which is self governed is called an Insulae. Insulae were also fractions of a city which constituted a body of tenements encircled by a public highway. Albona because it had a Dumviri at the head of the communes was also called a Republic. The borders of the Labinština Peninsula are made up of the Arsa/Raša river, which starts in the lake Cosliaco / Cepich, the only lake in the Istria, on the west and south, and the Kvarner Gulf (Golfo del Quarnaro) on the east and south. This lake was being fed by the Planinski masiv Učka mountain range located near Opatija (Abbazia) and the eastern coast of Istria. The Romans used this mountain range water source, and the Cepich lake, to feed major cities, from Labin on the east side to Pula (Pola) in the south.

Roman soldiers built military roads starting in Rome, capital of the Roman Empire, continuing in every direction across the Empire. One of the roads came across Istria County and then branched to major cities. This road came through the city of Barban. The Romans built a bridge across the Raša River in Istria County. The road continued through Albona/Labin toward Dalmatia. The Romans built Aqueducts in Istria and other parts of the Roman Empire. Učka mountain (Monte Maggiore) is the largest mountain in Istria, located in the Ćićarija (Ciceria) mountain range on the east side of the Istrian peninsula. From this mountain range, water was transported to many cities by Roman aqueducts. The city of Pula (Pola) on the southern tip of Istria was the summer home of the Emperors and Caesar family who also built the Amphitheater, also known as the Arena. The Aqueducts were made of lead pipes and tubes to transport and direct water to various places in Istria. Using aqueducts as a way of transporting water where it was needed had been used across the vast Roman Empire for many centuries.

The following inscriptions in the church of St. Sabastian's altar was written on the marble tile, Latin: M-IVLIO SEVERO FILIPPO NOBILISSIMO CAESARI NOBILISSIMO PRINCIPI IVVENTVTIS RESPVBLICA ALBONESSIVM

(Italian: Marco Iulio Severo Filippo nobilissimo Caesare nobilissimo Principe (ivventvtis) Albona Republica, English: Mark Giulio Severo Filippo most noble Caesar most noble Prince (ivventvtis) Albona Republic)

=== Middle Ages ===
Slavic tribes have invaded this part of Istria since the end of the 6th century. Due to the destruction with the first invasions, the natives retreated to the fortified cities. The first Slavic tribes did not settle permanently. Croats who came in the 7th century settled permanently. The arrival was of enormous proportions, which is why the road leading from Labin via Pazin to Poreč was named Slavic cesta (lat. Via sclavorum) as early as the 12th century.

The 10th century the Byzantine Eastern Roman Emperor Constantine VII Porphyrogenitus in his De Administrando Imperio named Albona as "Castron Albonos".

From 1295 it was under the rule of the dukes of Pazin, and from 1381 it found itself under the jurisdiction of the Patriarchate of Aquileia.

=== Venetian rule ===
It fell under Venetian rule at the beginning of the 15th century, and in the north it bordered on feudal lordships as part of the Pazin principality. During the Venetian periods, Istria was divided into farming fractions or townships (comuni) each having a chief town called capo-comune. The person who was the head of each commune or contrada was called Zuppan and was elected to the position. One of the head townships (Head Commune) was the city of Albona; the other was the city of Fianona. Before 1632 there was only one district and that was the District od Albona. The district consisted of the castle of Albona and the castle of Fianona. The district had two collegiate churches for the two castles. In 1632, by The Provictor of Dalmazia and Albania, Antonio Civran, divided the territory of Albona into twelve townships (comuni), hamlets (ville), districts (contrade) and parishes which were the heads of districts before the organization of municipalities. Twelve townships or districts (Contrade) were mapped in the Labinština Peninsula. These twelve communes or districts were placed under the control of Albona, the Head Commune, capo comune.

The famous Lutheran reformer Matthias Flacius Illyricus (3 March 1520 – 11 March 1575), was born in Labin and a small exhibition in what was once his house, commemorates this. Unfortunately, due to the counter-reformation, he was forced to live most of his life in exile in Germany where he became the undisputed leader of the conservative wing of the Lutheran movement after the death of Luther. His chief literary legacy was in the area of biblical exegesis.

Continuous extraction of coal in Krapan mine began in 1785.

==== Parishes in 1632 ====
Dubrova-S.Domenica
Vettua-S.Martino
Schitazza-S.Lucia
Produbas-S.Lorenzo

=== Napoleonic and Austrian rule ===
In 1797 Treaty of Leoben, preliminary peace agreement between the Holy Roman Empire and the French First Republic that ended the War of the First Coalition, the Austrians were to take the Venetian possessions in the Balkans as the price of peace (18 April 1797) while France acquired the Lombard part of the State.

In 1805 Treaty of Pressburg, Istria was incorporated into the Kingdom of Italy, of which Napoleon had become king earlier that year. Istria was divided into six "Cantoni" or Districts; Capodistria, Pirano, Parenzo, Rovigno, Dignano, Albona. In 1810 Istria became part of the French Illyrian Provinces. In 1815 after French defeat, Istria became a possession of Austria.

In the redivision of which Austria decided in 1814–1818, the District of Albona, which consisted of two castles Albona and Fianona were made into two separate districts. District of Fianona had six sub-districts; Cere, Kugn, S.Domenica, Dubrova, Rippenda, and Vettue. District of Albona had four sub-districts; Chermenizza, Bergod, Vlakovo and Cerovica. The sub-district of Bersez was added later.

The Austrian Littoral was formed in 1849 from coastal territories which were controlled by the Austrian Empire. The Littoral included the cities of: Trieste, Gorizia and Gradisca, Fiume, the Istrian peninsula, the Kvarner (Quarnero) Islands, and Croatia that was not under military control. This gave Austria control of the major ports on the Kvarner Gulf. Austria began mapping the Littoral for agricultural and tax purposes. The Territory was divided into agricultural fractions. All the parcels were surveyed and mapped to show ownership. Each parcel of land was classified starting from class "I" as the best arable land, to the least arable land, and so-noted on the maps. Grains were harvested, and each type was noted showing yield per acre. The census, surveying, classification of land and forests, and all other noted yields of grain and animals, was completed in 1837.

In the 19th century, mining was developed (coal mines in the area of Krapan, Ripenda and Tupljak).

From 1861 Istria was under Austria-Hungary until 1918.

==== Townships or Ville in Labinština, Istria County in the 1800 ====
The townships of the territory of Albona were as follows with the city of ALBONA / LABIN as the Head Commune or capo comune of the territory:

Cerovica	Cere	Cugn	Vettua
S.Domenica	Bersetz	Marina	Ripenda
Chermenizza	Bergod	Vlahovo	Albona

==== Ports of Labinština ====
Since there were no roads in the territory, the sea was the only way that some hamlets would get supplies and exchanged oil, wine, salt, animals, and other goods in exchange for sugar, coffee, tobacco, and clothing. The locals also cut trees and sold timber to buyers who came on flat bottom boats called Trabakul. The following ports on the Labinstina coast in the Sea of Quarnero were frequented by ships from the major cities like Trieste, Venezia, among a few.

Name	Location
Rabaz	On the coast and was called Porto Albona
Porto Lungo	Duga Luka, north of St.Marina
S.Marina	In the valley of St.Marina
St.Giovanni in Beska	Brovinje on the north side of Voscice beach (just past the Barloda beach)
Valle de Tonni	Tonarica The place where they used to fish Tuna and called it "Pecheria"

=== Italian rule ===
Following the collapse of Austria-Hungary in 1918, Labinština and the whole of Istria – except the territory of Castua Kastav – went to Italy.

In March and April 1921, the town was the scene of a miners' strike which quickly grew into an anti-fascist rebellion, considered to be the first of its kind, and the declaration of the short-lived Labin Republic.

Under the Italian Fascist government of Benito Mussolini, non-Italians faced stringent political and cultural repression because they had now to integrate themselves into the Kingdom of Italy and learn the Italian language. In 1928 a project to reclaim large parts of the southern part of the Raša Valley and Krapanski Potok was started. In 1932 Lake Čepić was drained. In the 1936-1940 a "new town" of Raša was built as part of Mussolini's urban colonization of Istria. After Raša, new mining settlement Polabin (Pozzo Littorio) was built in the valley below the Old Town Labin. Podlabin is the last settlement that was built in the so-called fascist era, from 1940 to 1942, and solemnly inaugurated on 12 October 1942, marking the 20th anniversary of the March on Rome, which brought Mussolini's fascists to power.

In 1942, the Istrian coal mines reached the highest coal production of 1,158,000 tons. At that time up to 10,000 workers worked in the mines.

=== World War II ===
After the collapse of Fascist Italy in 1943, the city was occupied by the German Wehrmacht and was part of the Operational Zone of the Adriatic Littoral. A large number of citizens from Labinština took part in the People's Liberation Struggle during World War II. On that occasion, more than 1,300 people laid down their lives. After that, Labin became part of Croatia, Yugoslavia.

== Geography ==
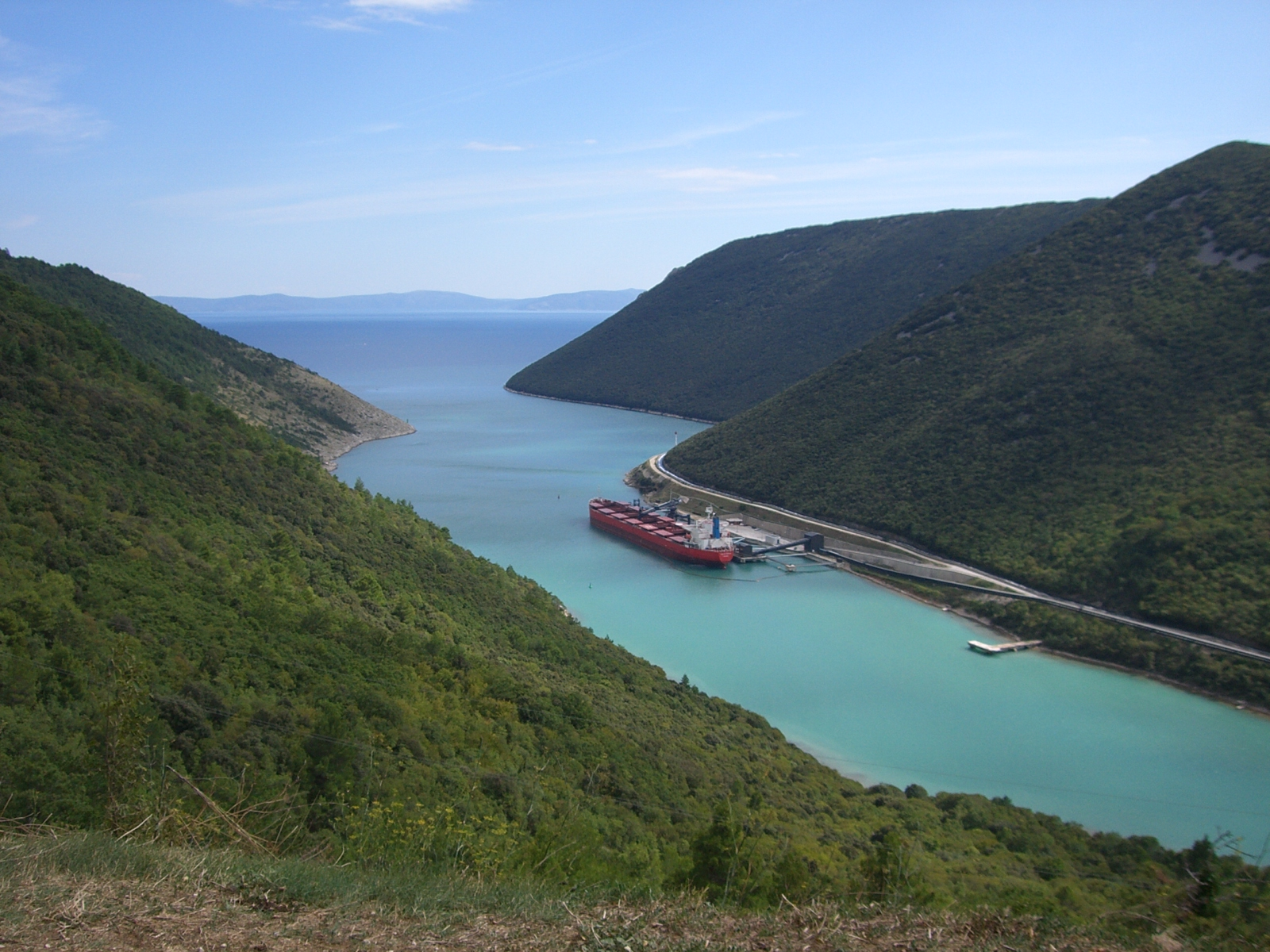
Plomin Bay

It is an undulating plateau bordered by deeply incised river valleys (Raša and Krapanski Potok) and a steep sea shore. The majority of land around Labin, Raša and Nedešćina, made of Karst limestones are of Cretaceous, Eocene age. The northern part is bordered by the flysch hills of central Istria, an area of marlstone and sandstone. The highest point excluding Učka massif is Goli Vrh 539 m (1,768.37 ft) above sea level located south of Labin.

The climate and vegetation are distinctly Mediterranean. In the northern part of the Labinština, there is a transitional area towards the continental climate and flora.

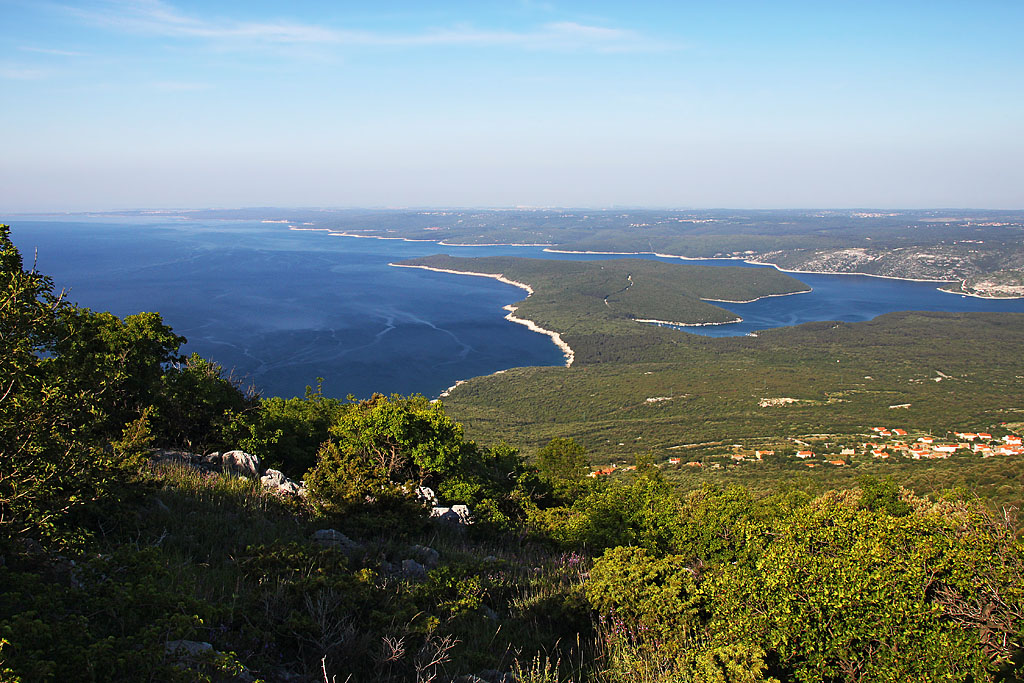
View of Ubas peninsula, the southernmost part of Labinština

== Economy ==
The coal mines, once important part of economy, were closed down in the late 20th century. There is a cement factory in Koromačno. The only large production plant is a Plomin Power Station. Tourism is developed along the coast, and elsewhere small production and tertiary activities are constituting the majority of economy. In the karst part, the traditional economic branch was agriculture (small vegetables, cereals and vines on small areas, and livestock). After Lake Čepić was drained and the southern part of the Raša Valley and Krapanski Potok was reclaimed, conditions were created for extensive agriculture. The state road Rijeka-Opatija-Pula (D 21) is important for traffic.

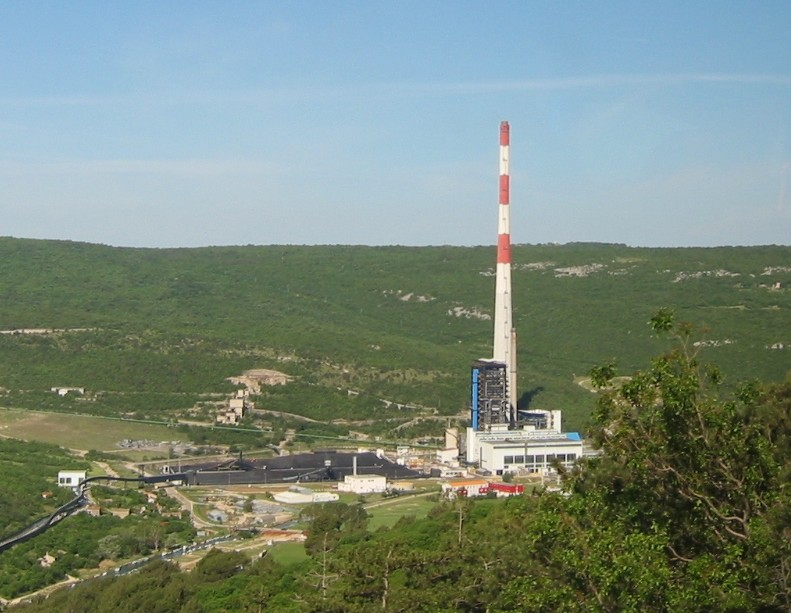
Plomin Power Plant

== Culture ==
Language

Labinjonska Cakavica, one of the most interesting and oldest indigenous Istrian dialects spoken in and around the town of Labin. It belongs to Northern Chakavian dialect of the Chakavian variety of Croatian. It differs from the usual Chakavian (with typical pronoun "ča") because it lacks most palatals, with other parallel deviations called "tsakavism" (cakavizam).

In 2019, by the decision of the Ministry of Culture, Labinjonska Cakavica became a protected intangible cultural asset of the Republic of Croatia.

== Population ==
According to a 2011 census, Labinština had 22,590 inhabitants.

Historical populations of former Labin Municipality (Općina Labin)
Year	Pop.	±%
1857	15,307	—
1869	15,835	+3.4%
1880	17,761	+12.2%
1890	19,049	+7.3%
1900	20,209	+6.1%
1910	21,681	+7.3%
1921	23,552	+8.6%
1931	24,455	+3.8%
1945	29,268	+19.7%
1948	28,125	−3.9%
1953	29,268	+4.1%
1961	28,526	−2.5%
1971	25,677	−10.0%
1981	25,500	−0.7%
1991	25,983	+1.9%
2001	24,131	−7.1%
2011	22,590	−6.4%
2021	20,754	−8.1%
Source: Naselja i stanovništvo Republike Hrvatske 1857–2001, DZS, Zagreb, 2005; Source for year 1945: Cadastre National de l'Istrie, Jadranski institut Sušak, 1946.

Ethnic group	Census 2011	Census 1991	Census 1981	Census 1945	Census 1910
Croats	14,357	11,545	20,079	26,083	17,912
Istrians	4,457	9,324	592	-	-
Bosniaks/Muslims	1,671	2,013	1,250	-	-
Italians	376	421	148	2,270	2,577
Serbs	404	523	522	-	-
Yugoslavs	-	534	2,787	-	-
Slovenes	115	245	294	352	171
Others	1,210	1,378		563	1,021
Total	22,590	25,983	25,500	29,268	21,681

=== Larger settlements ===
- Labin (Pop. 6,893)
- Raša (Pop. 1,440)
- Rabac (Pop. 1,393)
- Vinež (Pop. 1,219)
- Kapelica (Pop. 617)
- Nedeščina (Pop. 604)
- Presika (Pop. 578)
- Potpićan (Pop. 513)
- Štrmac (Pop. 439)
- Šumber (Pop. 432)
- Kršan (Pop. 238)
- Vozilići (Pop. 236)
- Sveti Bartul (Pop. 227)
- Marceljani (Pop. 192)
- Sveti Martin (Pop. 188)
- Koromačno (Pop. 180)
- Plomin Luka (Pop. 173)
- Vrećari (Pop. 168)
- Kožljak (Pop. 160)
- Brgod (Pop. 157)
- Topid (Pop. 136)
- Ripenda Kras (Pop. 124)
- Plomin (Pop. 113)
- Mali Golji (Pop. 110)

== Administration and politics ==
Labinština consists of 4 Municipalities and 1 Town (Labin):

- Labin
- Raša
- Sveta Nedelja
- Kršan (partially)
- Pićan (partially)

=== Mayors ===
Municipality	Mayor	Party
Labin	Valter Glavičić	IDS-DDI
Raša	Glorija Paliska Bolterstein	IDS-DDI
Sv. Nedelja	Irene Franković	IDS-DDI
Kršan	Roman Carić	Independent
Pićan	Dean Močinić	IDS-DDI

== See also ==
- Istrian Peninsula
- Istria County
- Labin
- Sveta Nedelja
- Raša
- Kršan
- Pićan
