= Muntić =

Muntić Monticchio
- Village
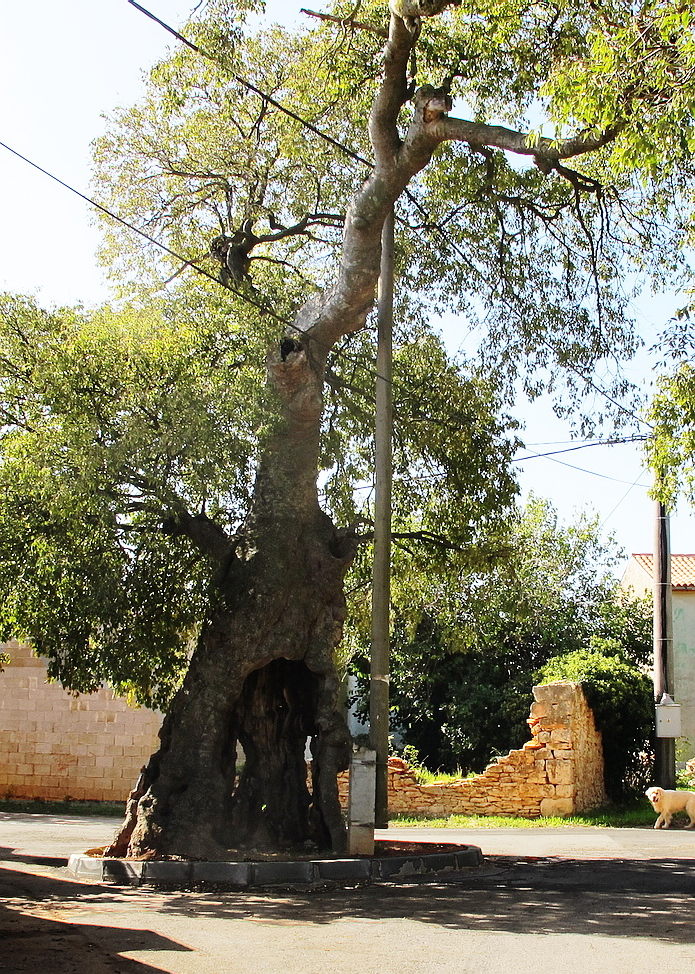
- The mediterranean Ladonja tree , C. australis (planted in the early 16th century)

- Location within Croatia
- Coordinates: 44.924935°N 13.948033°E
- Country: Croatia
- County: Istria County
- Municipality: Ližnjan
- Histri settlement: 11th century BC
- Roman foundation Sors Rumeianum: 178 BC

Area
  - Total: 2.1 sq mi (5.4 km^{2})
- Elevation: 531 ft (162 m)

Population (2021)
  - Total: 325
  - Density: 160/sq mi (60/km^{2})
- Time zone: UTC+1 (CET)
  - Summer (DST): UTC+2 (CEST)
- Postal code: 52100 Pula-Pola
- Area code: 052
- Vehicle registration: PU
- Patron saints: Saint Jerome
- Istrian traditional kantaduri singing in local chakavian dialect (Mario Radesic with Angelo Goldin)

Muntić (Italian: Monticchio; Monticchio Polesano; Latin Rumeianum) is a village in Southeastern Istria, Croatia. The etymological meaning is traced to the Latin, mòns, or monticulus, which means hill or little mountain.

== Geography ==
The village of Muntić is located 9 km (5.6 mi) from the ancient town of Pula, near the Pula airport. Muntić is situated on the top of a hill, from which you have a complete view of the southeastern Pula territory. As you head east away from the village, you will find the pre-Roman site of Nesactium, and Budava bay.

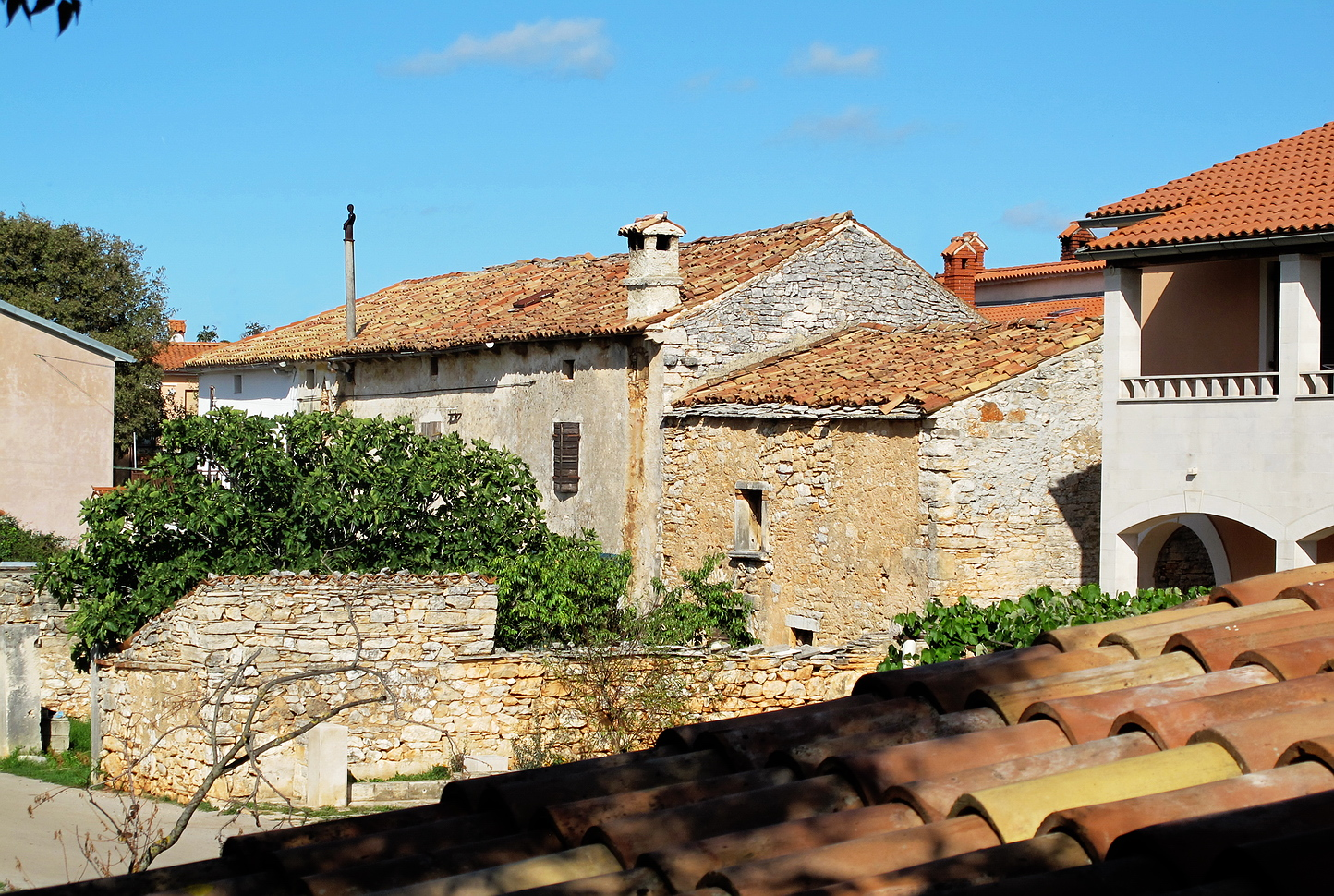
Old traditional house - Cvitko's hiža.

As per the tradition of rural Istria, Muntić is composed of old quarters mostly related to family clans, nicknames or ancestral names such as Brov, Zvonići, Placa, Barelini, Škabini (probably from Scabini), Markolovi, Krnjeli (commonly in Istria from the Friulian families arrived from Carnia), Čalići, etc.

== Demographics ==
According to the 2021 census, its population was 325. At the census in 2001, 406 inhabitants were counted.

Villagers tend to work in Pula, and many also still maintain their agricultural roots of wine making and olive growing. In the last ten years, there has been a significant increase in tourism, for those who enjoy farmhouse lodging and rustic B&Bs. Because of the close distance to Pula as well as the recent industrialization of southern Istria, only a few traditional Istrian stone houses exist.

== History ==
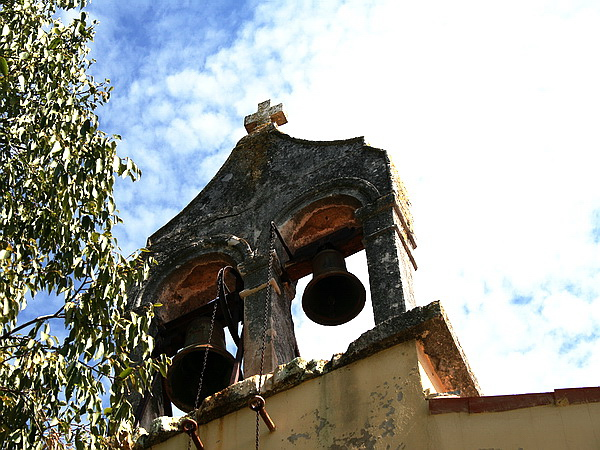
The Muntić parish church of Saint Jerome (12th century)

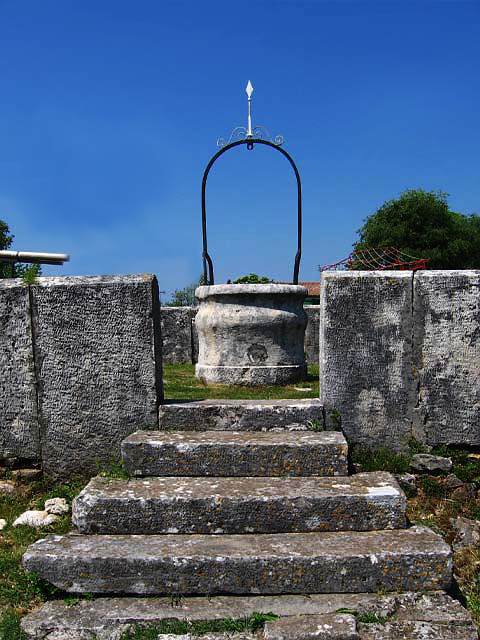
Medieval water cistern - šterna at the Muntić Placa

The region was inhabited during the Prehistory age. Pre-Roman fortress ruins exist near Nesactium and the village now known as Loborika. Dating after the Roman age, villa rustica remains can be seen at Radeki, at the Stancija Wasserman (Vasimova stancija). Historical evidence shows that Muntić was built over an ancient settlement of the Roman legion called Sors Rumeianum (Rumejarum), Rumianum or Rumiarum from the 1st century BC They settled in the area to conquer the Histrian hillfort of Nesactium, which was the most important spot of the entire peninsula. It was ruled by the Histrian's leader (king), Epulon, until they lost a battle with the Romans in 177 BC A large pond with the name Runjan (Rugnan, referencing Rumeianum) can still be found in Muntić today.

Muntić is mentioned several times later in history, the most relevant chronicles date to 1028, when villagers joined the Pula diocese fiefdom. Due to a cession, Muntić become a part of the Patriarchate of Aquileia. Because of frequent pestilence and wars, a large area of southern Istria was almost uninhabited until the 15-16th century. During that period, many refugees from the south Adriatic arrived -mostly from Dalmatia -to escape the invasion of the Ottomans. The newly established village was at that time owned by G.Barbarigo, and it was given the name of Muntić (until the 17th century it was common to find the name Montecchio sive Rumian).

The Muntić parish church of Saint Jerome, has a single nave (aisle) and double open arch belfry on its facade, with a bell from 1396 coined in Venice by the foundry of Marco Vendramo. The church is probably from the 12th century, and it is referred to as needing reconstruction during the 14th century. It is in the Romanesque style mixed with early Gothic. The interior features gothic groin vaults, and a baroque tabernacle with the inscription, Hic est corpus X. A painting of the Virgin Mary with saints is attributed to A.Samasso in 1827. From 1960-1980, the church had various gothic liturgical elements, including an ancient altar, hand crafted benches, antique frames with the Via Crucis, and a stone with an inscription in old-slavic glagolitic script, but unfortunately those items disappeared over time. Around 2000, the church underwent a devastating, inappropriate reconstruction, since there was no official supervision for the conservation of cultural heritage sites. It destroyed the hidden frescos and vault with its painting of a blue sky and yellow stars. On the exterior entrance, a pagan swastika was also eliminated.

There is another old church which was for centuries, a part of the Muntić parish community (today shared with the village of Valtura). It is a gothic church of the Blessed Virgin Mary (Our Lady of chestnut, or Kostanjica, as it's called by locals) from 1197, with a bell from 1454 coined by the foundry of Johanes Delton. Locals from Muntić used to form a [procession] to there, once a year, until the 1990s. It used to be dedicated to Saint Germanus, and it is located on an old Roman road that connects Nesactium to Trieste via Pula, where legend says that in 284, Saint Germanus was decapitated. On the facade is an inscription in Latin from the 14th century.

== Culture ==
Muntić has a style of Istrian singing called - kantaduri in local chakavian dialect. There is a notable collection of recordings archived at Radio Pula by the musicologist, Renato Pernić. The most famous kantaduri singers were Angelo Goldin and Mario Radešić, with Vilim Škuflić, Pere and Ive.

== Folklore ==
On September 30 of each year, locals venerate the patron of Muntić, St. Jerome.

Local legends refer to pagan superstitions, štriga (witch), štrigun (black magician) krsnik (warlock who uses white magic), and other pre-Christian entities.

== Sport ==
Muntić has had an active football club since 1976. Before the 1990s there was also a popular boules club (locally called burele).
