= Raša =

Raša may refer to:

- Raša, Istria County, a town in Istria
- Raša (river), a river in Istria
- 11400 Raša, an asteroid named after the river
- Raša, Slovenia, an abandoned settlement in Slovenia
