= Palpellia gens =

Ancient Roman family

The gens Palpellia was an obscure plebeian family at ancient Rome. Members of this gens are first mentioned during the first century of the Empire, with Sextus Palpellius Hister obtaining the consulship in AD 43. Few other Palpellii are known from the historians, but several are known from inscriptions.

== Origin ==
The nomen Palpellius belongs to a class of gentilicia formed directly from cognomina using the diminutive suffix -illius or -ellius. The name would thus seem to be derived from palpus, literally the palm of the hand; or metaphorically speaking, coaxing or flattery. The Palpellii were almost certainly Histrian, as the greatest number known from inscriptions lived in various towns of Histria, and the most prominent family bore the cognomen Hister.

== Praenomina ==
The main praenomina of the Palpellii were Publius and Sextus. A few of the Palpellii bore other names, including Gaius and Marcus. All of these were common names throughout Roman history.

== Branches and cognomina ==
The only distinct family of the Palpellii bore the cognomen Hister, signifying one of the Histri. It was one of a class of common surnames derived from places or peoples.

== Members ==
This list includes abbreviated praenomina. For an explanation of this practice, see filiation.

- Sextus Palpellius P. f. Hister, consul suffectus in AD 43, early in the reign of Claudius. (Note: Pliny relates a curious event which occurred during his consulship: an owl (Cuvier suggests the horned owl, but Pliny's description of the owl's behaviour and fearful shriek suggests the barn owl) entered the Capitol, and was regarded as so ill an omen that the entire city had to be purified on the Nones of March (March 7).) He had a distinguished public career, serving as a military tribune with the fourteenth legion, municipal judge, tribune of the plebs, praetor, and proconsul. He was governor of Pannonia in AD 50.
- Publius Palpellius P. f. Clodius Quirinalis, commander of the fleet at Ravenna at the commencement of the reign of Nero, had developed a reputation for rapaciousness and cruelty. He was one of the corrupt officials who escaped punishment by taking their own lives in AD 56.
- Sextus Palpellius (Sex. f. P. n.) Hister, a soldier in the fourth legion, who erected a monument to Sextus Palpellius Regulus, probably his brother.
- Sextus Palpellius Sex. f. (P. n.) Regulus, a veteran of the seventh legion, buried at Pola in Histria during the late first century, with a monument erected by Sextus Palpellius Hister, probably his brother.
- Gaius Palpellius M. f., named in an inscription from Venafrum in Samnium.
- Sextus Palpellius Candidus Tullittianus, named in an inscription from Samothrace.
- Palpellia Corinna, a freedwoman at Pola.
- Sextus Palpellius P. f. Faustus, one of the duumviri at Carthage, where he was also a flamen of Augustus, and twice served as quaestor.
- (Palpellius) Florus, the husband of Ampliata and father of Sextus Palpellius Maximus.
- Sextus Palpellius Sex. l. Fructus Augustalis, a freedman, and the husband of Allia Prisca, named in an inscription from Humacum in Histria.
- Palpellia C. l. Hypora, a freedwoman, named in an inscription from Venafrum.
- Sextus Palpellius Sex. f. Mancia, one of the duumviri at Pola.
- Palpellia Maxima, wife of Marcus Atilius Ruf[us?], buried at Apsorus in Dalmatia.
- Palpellia P. f. Maxima, buried at Pola.
- Sextus Palpellius Maximus, son of Florus and Ampliata, buried at Nesactium in Histria.
- Palpellia Sex. l. Primilla, a freedwoman named in a funerary inscription from Rome.
- Sextus Palpellius Sex. l. Prothymus, a freedman named in a funerary inscription from Rome.
- Palpellia Trophime, named in a funerary inscription from Pola.
- Palpellius Vitalis, a freedman at Pola.

== See also ==
- List of Roman gentes

== Bibliography ==
- Gaius Plinius Secundus (Pliny the Elder), Naturalis Historia (Natural History).
- Publius Cornelius Tacitus, Annales.
- Theodor Mommsen et alii, Corpus Inscriptionum Latinarum (The Body of Latin Inscriptions, abbreviated CIL), Berlin-Brandenburgische Akademie der Wissenschaften (1853–present).
- René Cagnat et alii, L'Année épigraphique (The Year in Epigraphy, abbreviated AE), Presses Universitaires de France (1888–present).
- George Davis Chase, "The Origin of Roman Praenomina", in Harvard Studies in Classical Philology, vol. VIII (1897).
- Paul von Rohden, Elimar Klebs, & Hermann Dessau, Prosopographia Imperii Romani (The Prosopography of the Roman Empire, abbreviated PIR), Berlin (1898).
- Inscriptiones Italiae (Inscriptions from Italy, abbreviated InscrIt), Rome (1931-present).
- Africa Romana (Roman Africa, abbreviated AfrRom).
- John C. Traupman, The New College Latin & English Dictionary, Bantam Books, New York (1995).
