= Ližnjan =

Ližnjan Lisignano
- Municipality
- Ližnjan Municipality; Općina Ližnjan - Comune di Lisignano
- Flag

- Location of Ližnjan municipality in Istria
- Interactive map of Ližnjan
- Location within Croatia
- Coordinates: 44°50′N 13°57′E
- Country: Croatia
- County: Istria County

Government
  - Mayor: Marko Ravnić

Area
  - Municipality: 68.1 km^{2} (26.3 sq mi)
  - Urban: 10.6 km^{2} (4.1 sq mi)

Population (2021)
  - Municipality: 4,087
  - Density: 60.0/km^{2} (155/sq mi)
  - Urban: 1,445
  - Urban density: 136/km^{2} (353/sq mi)
- Time zone: UTC+1 (CET)
  - Summer (DST): UTC+2 (CEST)
- Postal code: 52100 Pula
- Area code: 052
- Website: liznjan.hr

Ližnjan (Italian: Lisignano) is a village and municipality in Istria, Croatia, known for its high biodiversity.

There is a small church named Crkva Majke Božje od Kuj that dates back to the 17th century but was built on ancient foundations. It has a glass floor with an ornamental painting underneath. Importantly, the municipality also includes the remains of the ancient city of Nesactium, built by the ancient Histri.

== Demographics ==
According to the 2021 census, its population was 4,087, with 1,445 living in the town proper. It was 3,965 in 2011.

The municipality consists of the following settlements:

- Jadreški, population 537
- Ližnjan, population 1,445
- Muntić, population 325
- Šišan, population 1,007
- Valtura, population 773
Ližnjan: Population trends 1857–2021
v

population	1436	1767	1884	2255	2625	3313	3303	3548	2837	2659	2636	2247	2221	2371	2945	3965	4087
	1857	1869	1880	1890	1900	1910	1921	1931	1948	1953	1961	1971	1981	1991	2001	2011	2021

Sources: Croatian Bureau of Statistics publications

== Sport ==
Ližnjan has a football team named Liznjan. They came first in the 2 league and now they are fighting for progress.
