= Caloptilia fidella =

Scientific classification
- Domain: Eukaryota
- Kingdom: Animalia
- Phylum: Arthropoda
- Class: Insecta
- Order: Lepidoptera
- Family: Gracillariidae
- Genus: Caloptilia
- Species: C. fidella

Binomial name
- Caloptilia fidella (Reutti, 1853)

Synonyms
- Gracilaria fidella Reutti, 1853

Species of moth

Caloptilia fidella is a moth of the family Gracillariidae. It is found from Germany to Italy and North Macedonia and from France to Russia and Ukraine.

The larvae feed on Celtis australis and Humulus lupulus. They mine the leaves of their host plant.
