= Krapanski Potok =

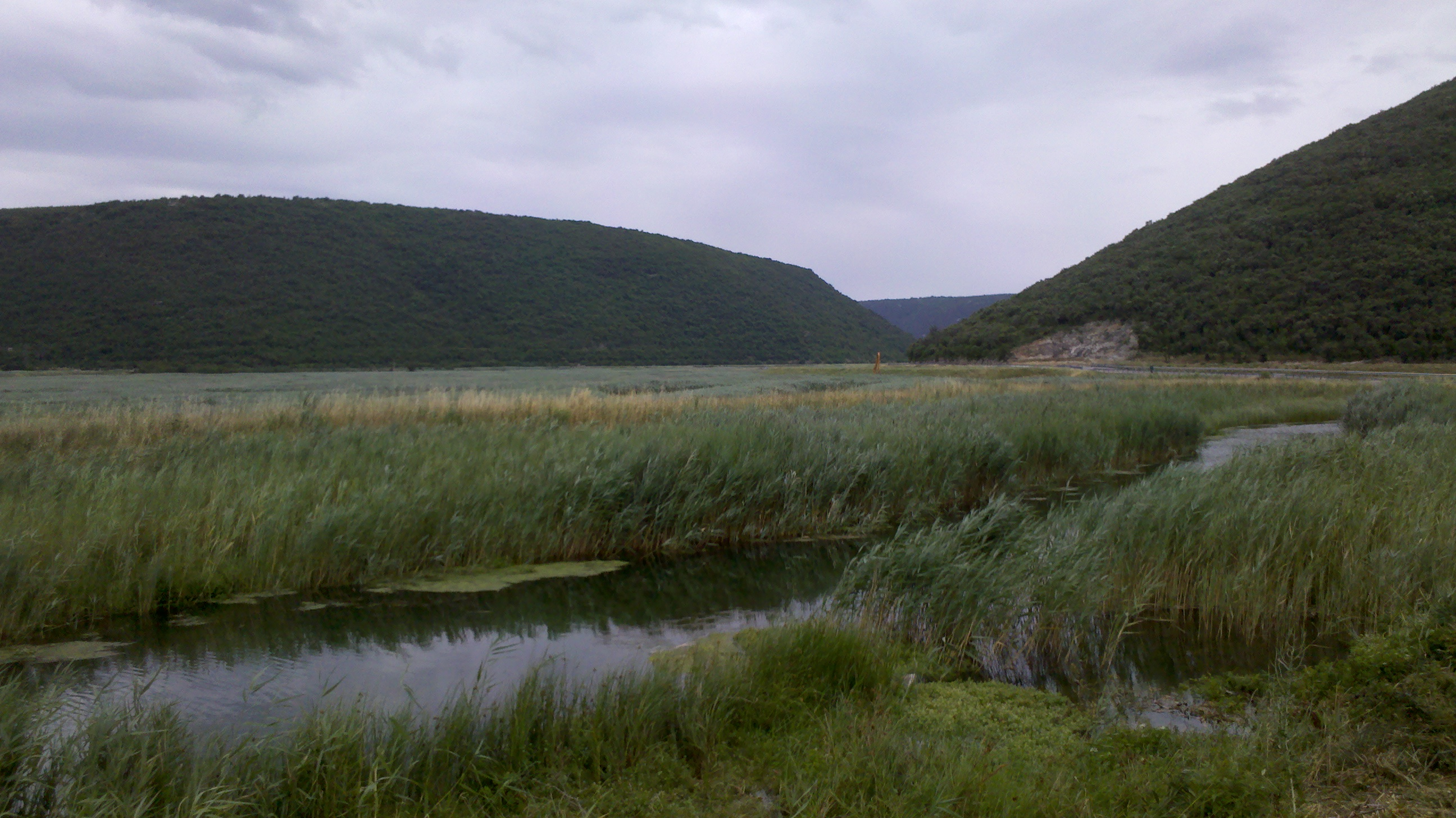

Location
- Country: Croatia

Physical characteristics
- Source
  - location: Near Krapan, Croatia
  - elevation: 20 m (66 ft)
- Mouth
  - location: Raša
  - coordinates: 45.0524°N 14.0487°E
  - elevation: 10 m (33 ft)
- Length: 5 km (3.1 mi)

Basin features
- Progression: Raša→ Adriatic Sea

The Krapanski Potok is a tributary to the Raša in Istria, Croatia.

It originates northeast of the village of Krapan, close to Labin. It flows roughly southwest, through the town of Raša, and into the Raša close to the village Most Raša.
