= Ravni =

Ravni may refer to:

- Ravni, Mostar, a village in Bosnia and Herzegovina
- Ravni (Brus), a village in the Brus municipality, Serbia
- Ravni (Užice), a village in the Užice municipality, Serbia
- Ravni, Slovenia, a settlement in the Krško municipality in eastern Slovenia
- Ravni, Montenegro, village, Kolašin Municipality near Morača in Montenegro
- Ravni, Istria County, a village in Croatia
