= Epichnopterix sieboldii =

Scientific classification
- Domain: Eukaryota
- Kingdom: Animalia
- Phylum: Arthropoda
- Class: Insecta
- Order: Lepidoptera
- Family: Psychidae
- Genus: Epichnopterix
- Species: E. sieboldii

Binomial name
- Epichnopterix sieboldii (Reutti, 1853)

Synonyms
- Canephora sieboldii Reutti, 1853; Epichnopterix sieboldi

Species of moth

Epichnopterix sieboldii is a moth of the family Psychidae. It is found in parts of central Europe, France, Spain and Greece.

The wingspan of the males is 10–14 mm. Females are wingless. Adult males are on wing from the beginning of April to the end of March.

The larvae feed on various herbaceous plants.
