= Drenje =

Drenje may refer to:

- Drenje, Osijek-Baranja County, a municipality in Croatia
- Drenje, Istria County, a hamlet in Croatia
- Drenje, Dolenjske Toplice, a small settlement in Slovenia

== See also ==
- Drenje Brdovečko, a small settlement in Zagreb County, Croatia
- Drenje Šćitarjevsko, a village in Zagreb County, Croatia
