= Barbići =

Barbići Barbici, Villa Barbich
- Village
- Location within Croatia
- Coordinates: 45.0879237°N 14.0439734°E
- Country: Croatia
- County: Istria County
- Municipality: Raša

Area
  - Total: 0.50 sq mi (1.3 km^{2})

Population (2021)
  - Total: 55
  - Density: 110/sq mi (42/km^{2})
- Time zone: UTC+1 (CET)
  - Summer (DST): UTC+2 (CEST)
- Postal code: 52220 Labin
- Area code: 052

Barbići (Italian: Barbici or Villa Barbich) is a village in the municipality of Raša, Istria in Croatia.

== Demographics ==
According to the 2021 census, its population was 55.
