= Sveta Marina =

Sveta Marina Santa Marina d'Albona
- Village
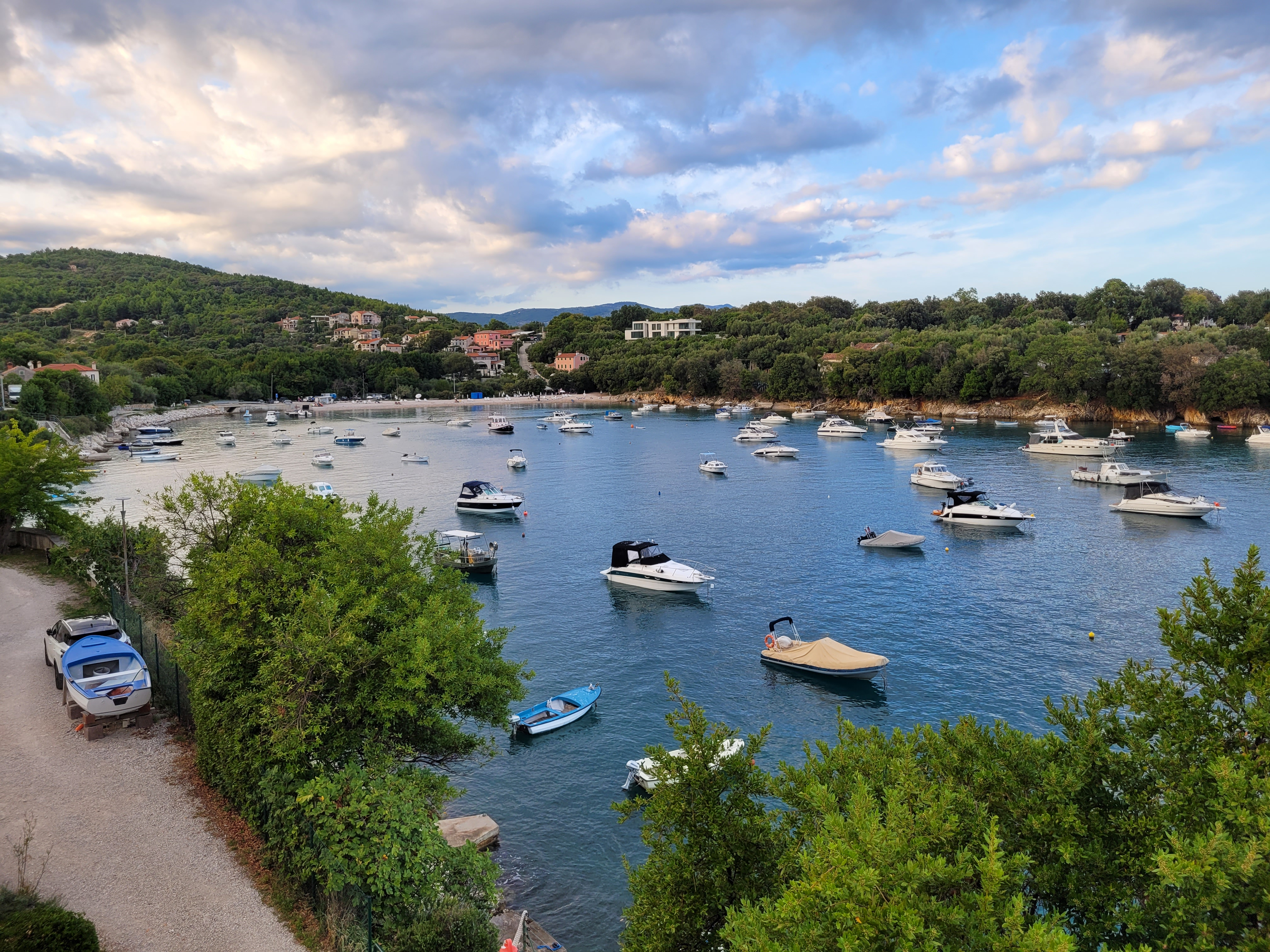

- Location within Croatia
- Coordinates: 45.043082°N 14.1249707°E
- Country: Croatia
- County: Istria County
- Municipality: Raša

Area
  - Total: 1.3 sq mi (3.3 km^{2})

Population (2021)
  - Total: 49
  - Density: 38/sq mi (15/km^{2})
- Time zone: UTC+1 (CET)
  - Summer (DST): UTC+2 (CEST)
- Postal code: 52220 Labin
- Area code: 052

Sveta Marina (Italian: Santa Marina d'Albona) is a village in the municipality of Raša, Istria in Croatia.

== Demographics ==
According to the 2021 census, its population was 49.
