= Trget =

Trget Traghetto
- Village
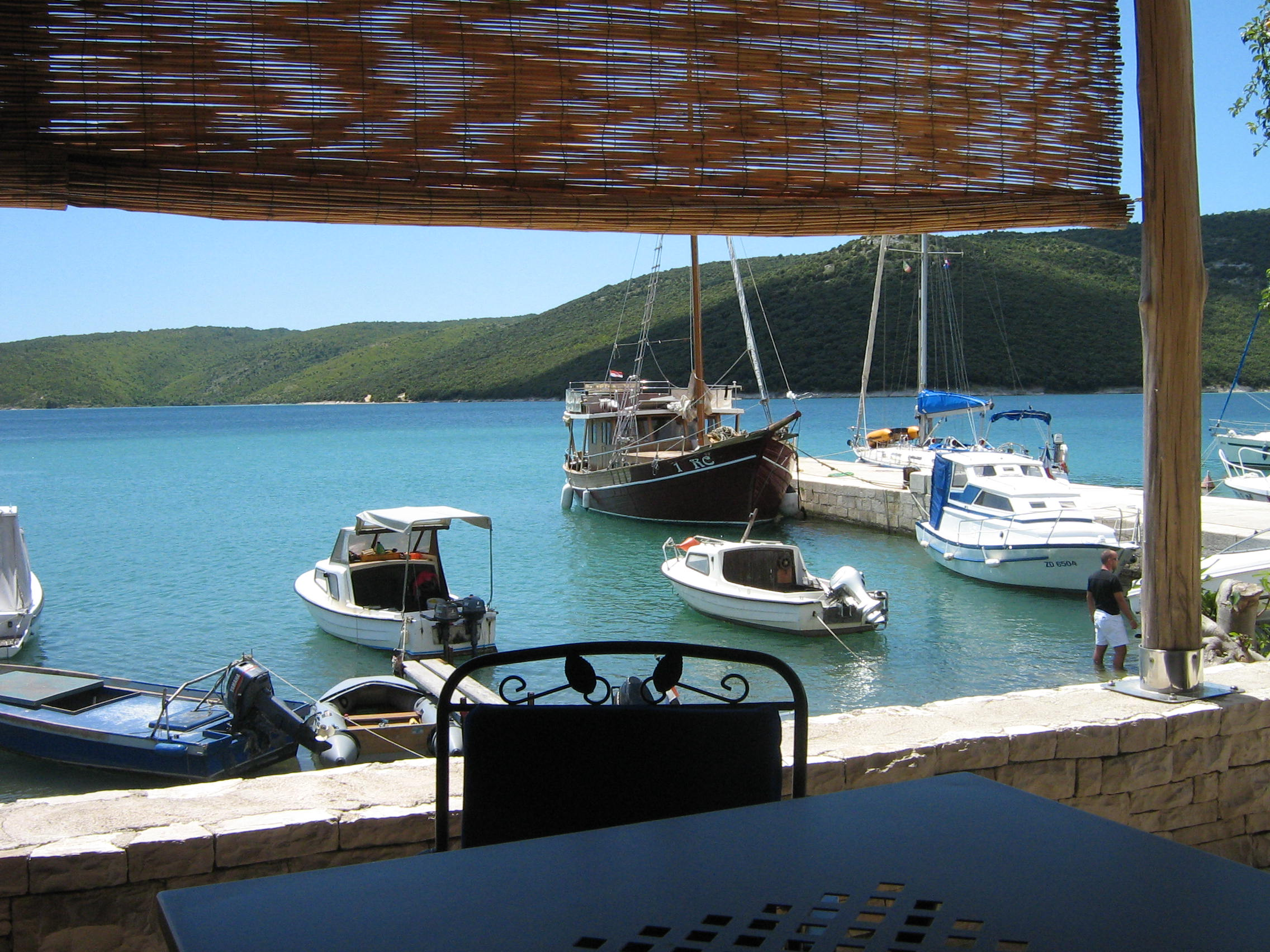

- Location within Croatia
- Coordinates: 45.0241397°N 14.0365583°E
- Country: Croatia
- County: Istria County
- Municipality: Raša

Area
  - Total: 0.54 sq mi (1.4 km^{2})

Population (2021)
  - Total: 31
  - Density: 57/sq mi (22/km^{2})
- Time zone: UTC+1 (CET)
  - Summer (DST): UTC+2 (CEST)
- Postal code: 52224 Trget
- Area code: 052

Trget (Italian: Traghetto) is a village in the municipality of Raša, Istria in Croatia.

== Demographics ==
According to the 2021 census, its population was 31.
