= Most-Raša =

Most-Raša Ponte d'Arsia
- Village
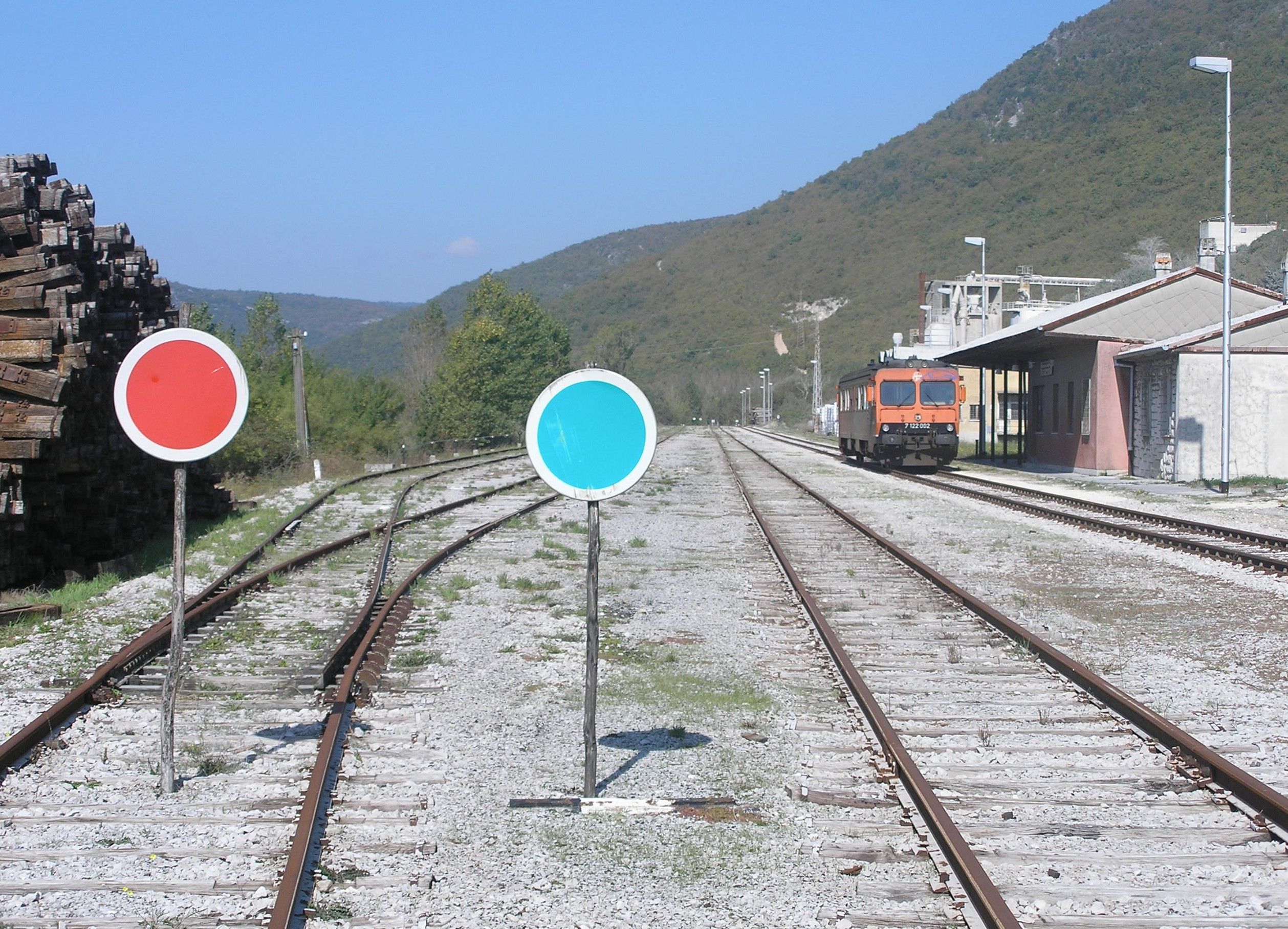

- Location within Croatia
- Coordinates: 45.0495728°N 14.0310966°E
- Country: Croatia
- County: Istria County
- Municipality: Raša

Area
  - Total: 1.9 sq mi (5.0 km^{2})

Population (2021)
  - Total: 63
  - Density: 33/sq mi (13/km^{2})
- Time zone: UTC+1 (CET)
  - Summer (DST): UTC+2 (CEST)
- Postal code: 52223 Raša
- Area code: 052

Most-Raša (Italian: Ponte d'Arsia) is a village in the municipality of Raša, Istria in Croatia.

== Demographics ==
According to the 2021 census, its population was 63.
