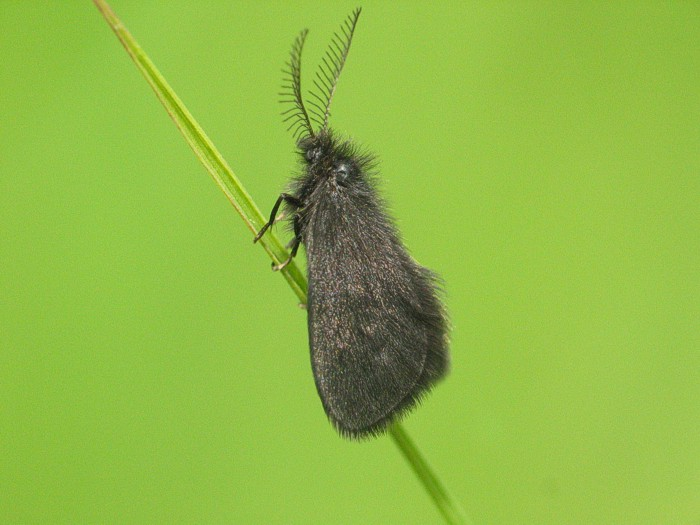
- Male
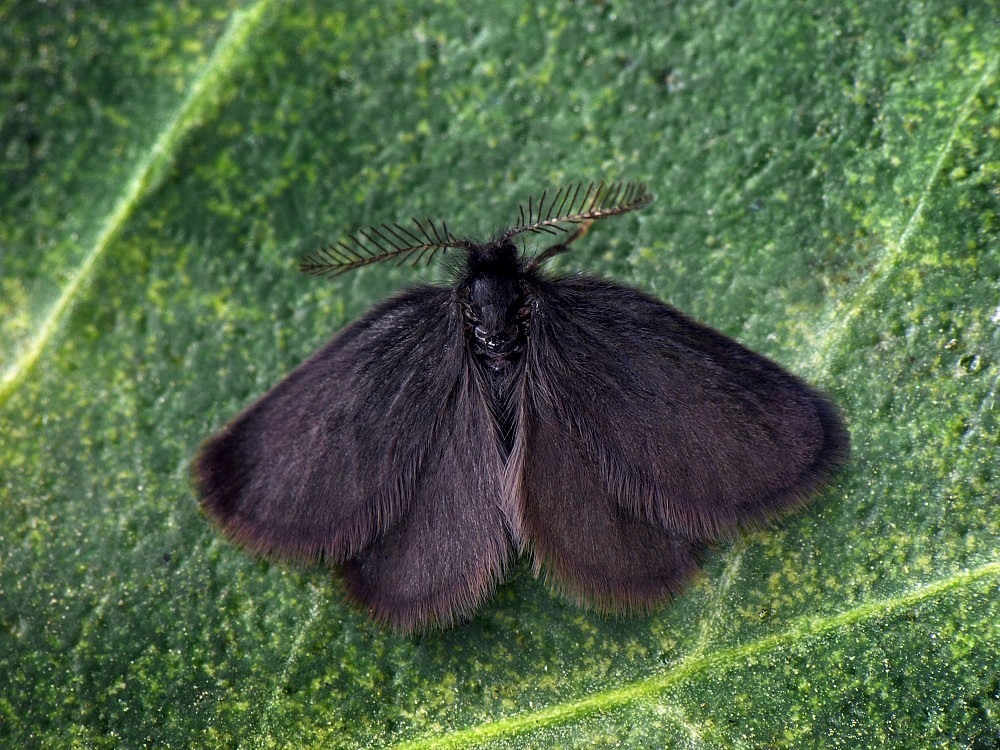

Scientific classification
- Kingdom: Animalia
- Phylum: Arthropoda
- Class: Insecta
- Order: Lepidoptera
- Family: Psychidae
- Genus: Epichnopterix
- Species: E. plumella

Binomial name
- Epichnopterix plumella Denis & Schiffermüller, 1775

= Epichnopterix plumella =

Species of moth

Epichnopterix plumella is a moth of the family Psychidae. It is found in Europe. The female has reduced wings and remains in the caterpillar bag.

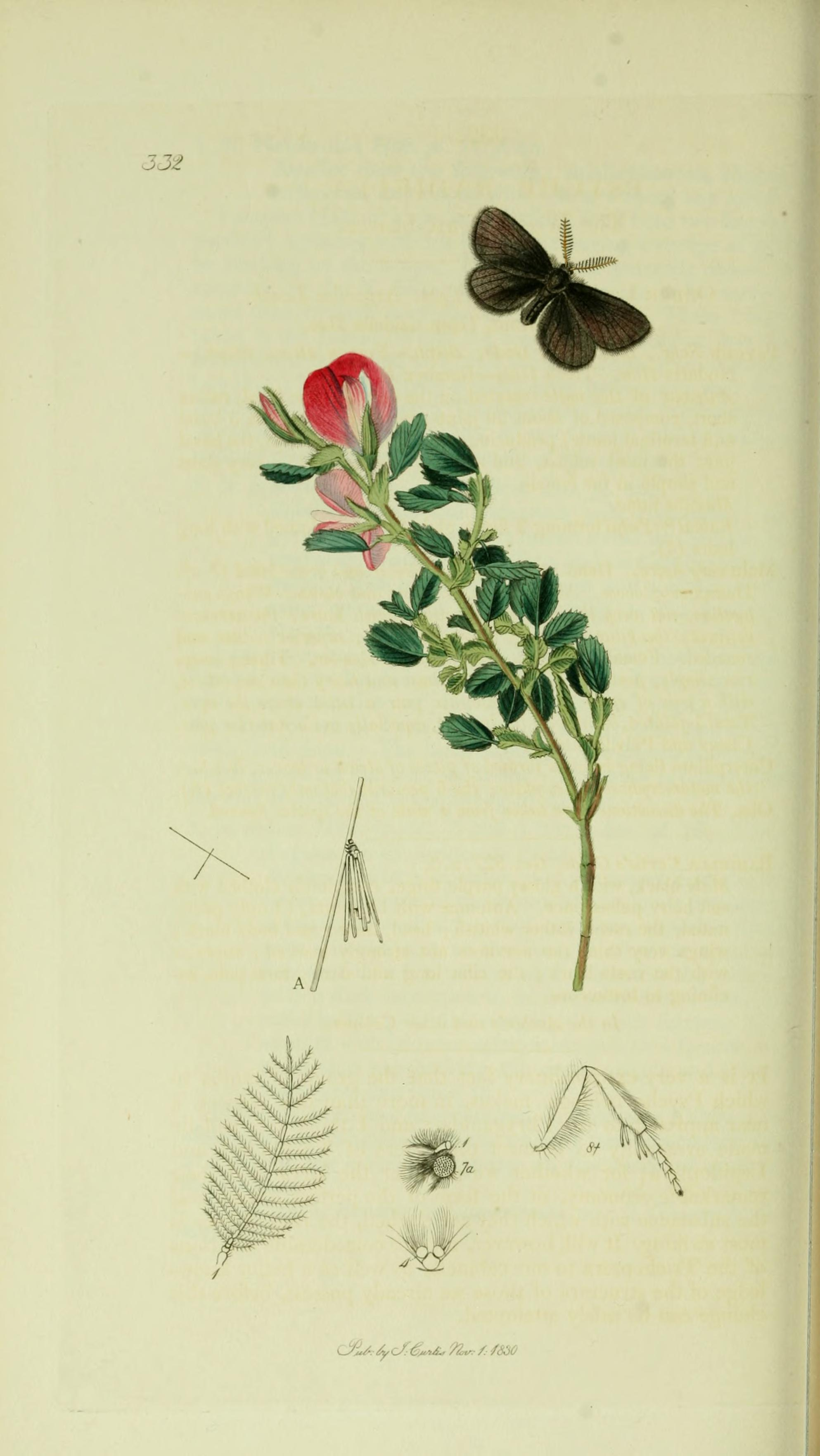
Illustration from John Curtis's British Entomology Volume 5

The wingspan of the male is about 12 mm. His body is black and shaggy-woolly. Both the forewings and the hind wings are rounded at the wing end. The antennae are combed on both sides. The female is red-yellow, her abdomen has a yellow spot. The wings are stubby. The basic colour of the caterpillar is red, the head is black. On the red body there are black dorsal shields, which are segmented by yellow stripes.

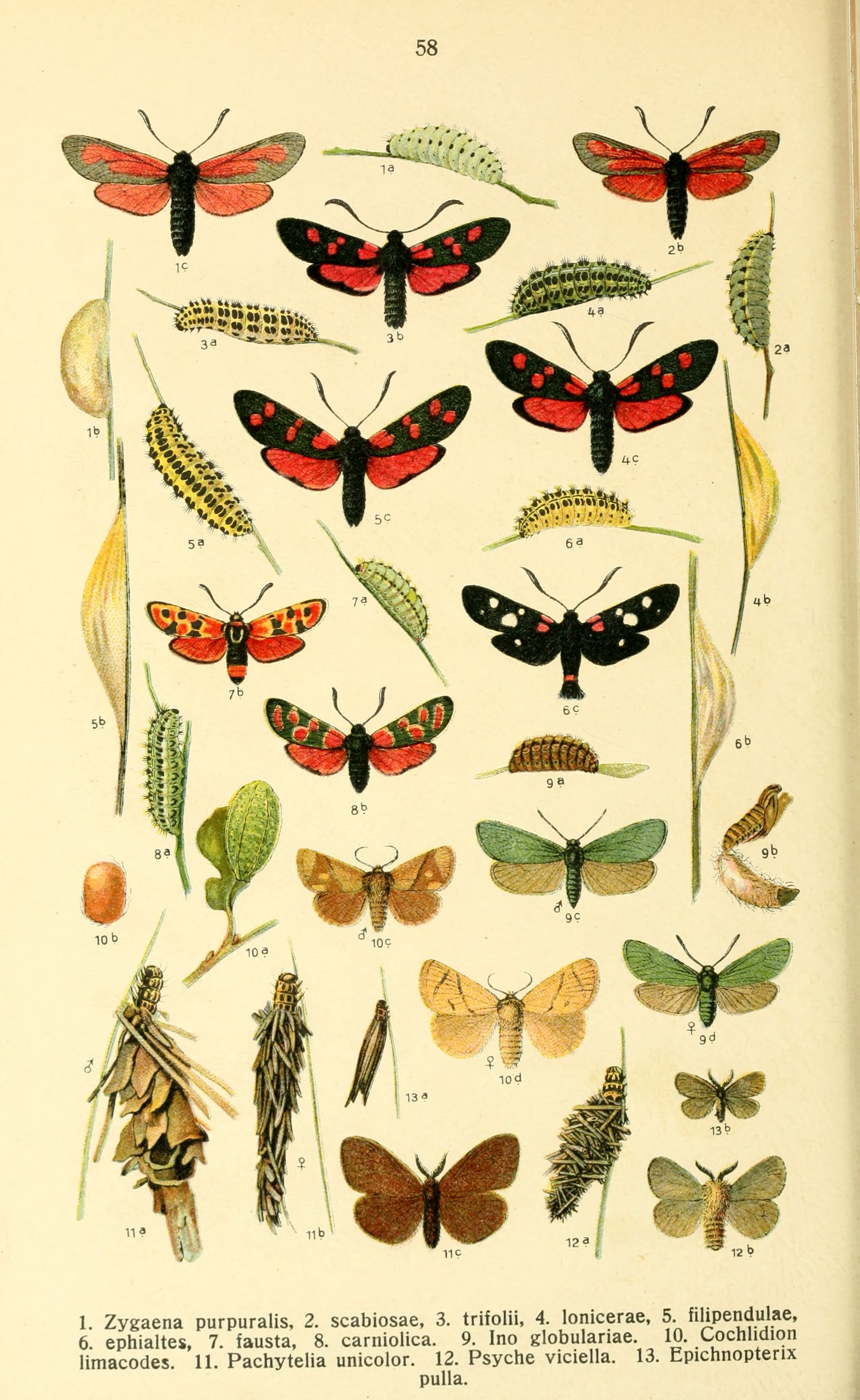
Plate depicting the larva in its case (as pulla Esper, 1785 fig. 13a)

Like many Psychidae, the caterpillar weaves itself into a silk sack to which it attaches foreign materials. This sack has a round to oval cross-section, the foreign materials are long, flat blades of grass made of various grasses, they tower above the silk sack and are arranged parallel to the longitudinal axis of the silk sack. The entire structure is shorter than 20 millimetres and is spun to the food plants. The upward-facing front is open, allowing the caterpillar to stretch out its front segments and front legs. The larvae feed on various grass species. The moth flies in one generation from mid-April to mid-June.

== Notes ==
1. The flight season refers to Belgium and The Netherlands. This may vary in other parts of the range.
