= Stanišovi =

Stanišovi Stanissovi
- Village
- Location within Croatia
- Coordinates: 45.004432°N 14.0705829°E
- Country: Croatia
- County: Istria County
- Municipality: Raša

Area
  - Total: 2.1 sq mi (5.4 km^{2})

Population (2021)
  - Total: 33
  - Density: 16/sq mi (6.1/km^{2})
- Time zone: UTC+1 (CET)
  - Summer (DST): UTC+2 (CEST)
- Postal code: 52222 Koromačno
- Area code: 052

Stanišovi (Italian: Stanissovi) is a village in the municipality of Raša, Istria in Croatia.

== Demographics ==
According to the 2021 census, its population was 33.
