= Sveti Bartul =

Sveti Bartul San Bortolo
- Village
- Interactive map of Sveti Bartul
- Location within Croatia
- Coordinates: 45.0858622°N 14.0634316°E
- Country: Croatia
- County: Istria County
- Municipality: Raša

Area
  - Total: 1.0 sq mi (2.6 km^{2})

Population (2021)
  - Total: 265
  - Density: 260/sq mi (100/km^{2})
- Time zone: UTC+1 (CET)
  - Summer (DST): UTC+2 (CEST)
- Postal code: 52220 Labin
- Area code: 052

Sveti Bartul (Italian: San Bortolo) is a village in the municipality of Raša, Istria in Croatia.

== Demographics ==
According to the 2021 census, its population was 265.
