= Epulon =

Histri king in Illyria from 181–177 BC

- Reign: 181–177 BC
- Died: 177 BC; Nesactium

Epulon (Epulo, Epulone, Aepulo; ruled 181 – 177 BC) was a king or tribal leader of the Histri in northern Illyria. Epulon conducted a series of wars against commanders sent by the Roman Republic during the Roman expansion of the first half of the 2nd century BC, until his death in 177 BC.

== Military activities ==
Rome had already consolidated its conquest of various peoples of northern Italy, and established good relations with the Adriatic Veneti. From there, Rome launched campaigns against the southern Illyrians of the Ardiaean Kingdom, and the northern Illyrians of the northern Adriatic and eastern Alps. Threatened by imminent loss of independence, Histria launched a first, indecisive attack against the Romans, in 221 BC. Another attack, in 181 BC at the new-founded colony of Aquileia, was beaten off by the Roman praetor Q. Fabius Buteo, who established a peace treaty with the Histrians. Later that year, Epulon became king of the Histrians; he was warlike, uncompromising and persistent, and immediately prepared for battle against the Aquilean colony. Rome sent an army in its defense in 178 BC, under the consul A. Manlius Vulso. The Histrians made a successful attack on a Roman camp and drove the legions in panic who quickly fled. Epulon's forces took a great booty of valuables, equipment, food and wine. After initial successes in defeating his enemies at Aquilea, Epulon was defeated in northern Istria and forced to withdraw his forces to the Histrian capital of Nesactium.

Before attacking Nesactium the Romans captured other important Histrian centers in Istria. It is said that the Romans were at first unable to take Nesactium and did not made any success in their lengthy siege of the city. In 177 BC, under the consul C. Claudius Pulcher who had brought two new legions, the success of their assault changed only when the Romans in a few days, diverted a river which protected Nesactium and provided them with water. The Histrians chose to fight rather than to surrender the city. The Histrians killed their women and children and threw them from the city walls while at the same time fought the Romans. When Epulon realised that the Romans had won, he committed suicide by stabbing himself with a sword to avoid Roman captivity. The survivors were killed or captured. After the fall of Nesactium other Istrian cities also suffered the same fate. Soon all of Istria was conquered as well as the independence of the Histrians. According to Livy, 5,632 Histrians were sold into slavery.

== See also ==
- Illyrian warfare
- List of rulers of Illyria
- Istria
- Nesactium
- Histrii ambush on Roman camps

== Bibliography ==
- Mesihović, Salmedin; Šačić, Amra (2015). Historija Ilira [History of Illyrians] (in Bosnian). Sarajevo: Univerzitet u Sarajevu [University of Sarajevo]. ISBN 978-9958-600-65-4.
