= Crni =

Crni Cerni
- Village
- Location within Croatia
- Coordinates: 45.0339172°N 14.1313738°E
- Country: Croatia
- County: Istria County
- Municipality: Raša

Area
  - Total: 0.62 sq mi (1.6 km^{2})

Population (2021)
  - Total: 20
  - Density: 32/sq mi (13/km^{2})
- Time zone: UTC+1 (CET)
  - Summer (DST): UTC+2 (CEST)
- Postal code: 52220 Labin
- Area code: 052

Crni (Italian: Cerni) is a village in the municipality of Raša, Istria in Croatia.

== Demographics ==
According to the 2021 census, its population was 20.
