= Šišan =

Šišan Sissano
- Village
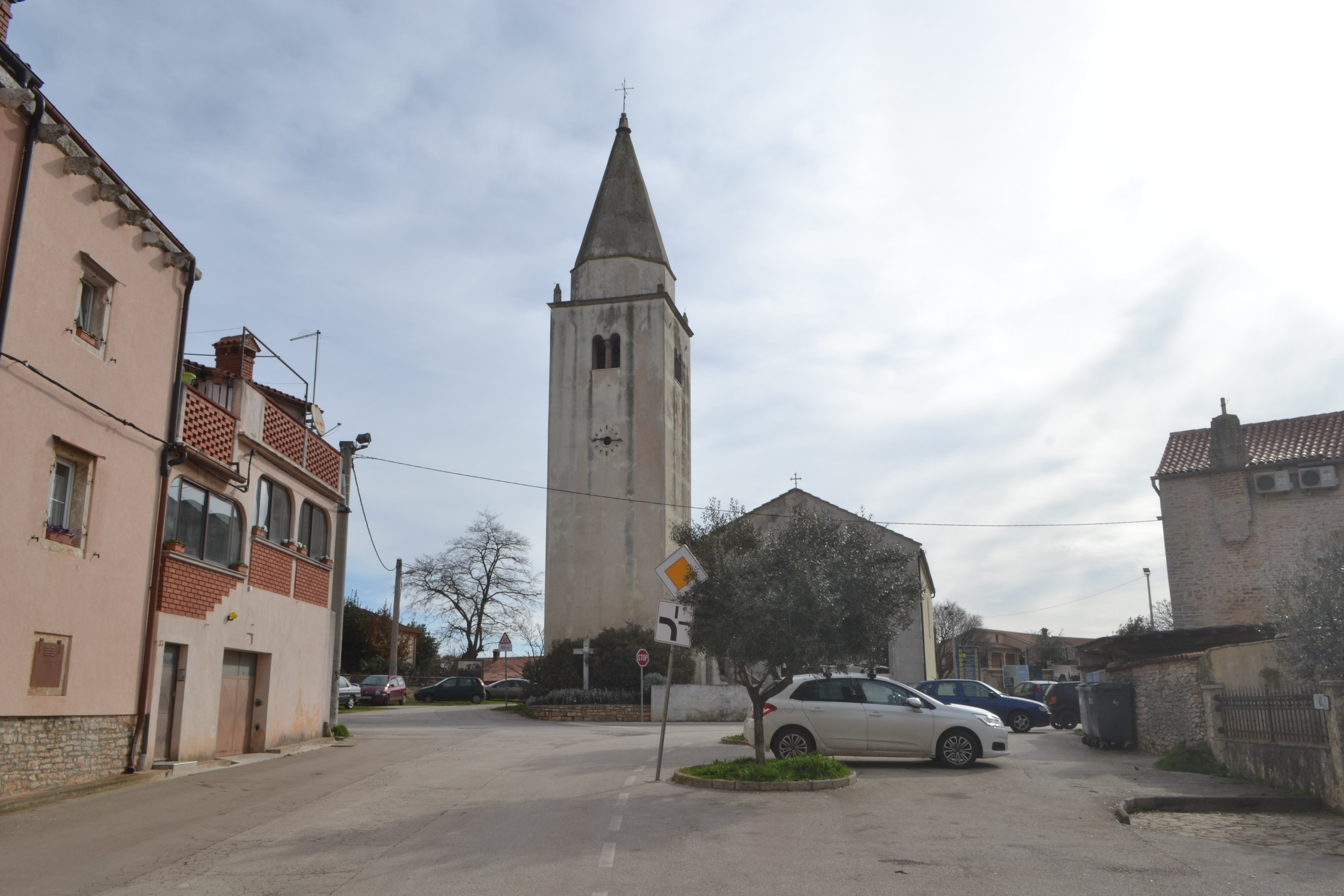

- Location within Croatia
- Coordinates: 44°51′07″N 13°56′35″E
- Country: Croatia
- County: Istria County
- Municipality: Ližnjan

Area
  - Total: 9.2 sq mi (23.9 km^{2})

Population (2021)
  - Total: 1,007
  - Density: 109/sq mi (42.1/km^{2})
- Time zone: UTC+1 (CET)
  - Summer (DST): UTC+2 (CEST)
- Postal code: 52100 Pula
- Area code: 052

Šišan (Italian: Sissano) is a village in the municipality of Ližnjan-Lisignano, in southern Istria in Croatia.

== Demographics ==
According to the 2021 census, its population was 1,007. In 2001 it had a population of 623.
