= Trgetari =

Trgetari Traghettari
- Village
- Location within Croatia
- Coordinates: 45.0137899°N 14.0523108°E
- Country: Croatia
- County: Istria County
- Municipality: Raša

Area
  - Total: 1.7 sq mi (4.5 km^{2})

Population (2021)
  - Total: 49
  - Density: 28/sq mi (11/km^{2})
- Time zone: UTC+1 (CET)
  - Summer (DST): UTC+2 (CEST)
- Postal code: 52224 Trget
- Area code: 052

Trgetari (Italian: Traghettari) is a village in the municipality of Raša, Istria in Croatia.

== Demographics ==
According to the 2021 census, its population was 49.
