= Jadreški =

Jadreški Giadreschi
- Village
- Location within Croatia
- Coordinates: 44°52′08″N 13°55′01″E
- Country: Croatia
- County: Istria County
- Municipality: Ližnjan

Area
  - Total: 0.93 sq mi (2.4 km^{2})

Population (2021)
  - Total: 537
  - Density: 580/sq mi (220/km^{2})
- Time zone: UTC+1 (CET)
  - Summer (DST): UTC+2 (CEST)
- Postal code: 52100 Pula
- Area code: 052

Jadreški (Italian: Giadreschi) is a village in the municipality of Ližnjan, in southern Istria in Croatia.

== Demographics ==
According to the 2021 census, its population was 537. In 2011 it had a population of 501.
