= Brgod =

Brgod Bergodi
- Village
- Location within Croatia
- Coordinates: 45.0375822°N 14.0473931°E
- Country: Croatia
- County: Istria County
- Municipality: Raša

Area
  - Total: 2.4 sq mi (6.1 km^{2})

Population (2021)
  - Total: 174
  - Density: 74/sq mi (29/km^{2})
- Time zone: UTC+1 (CET)
  - Summer (DST): UTC+2 (CEST)
- Postal code: 52224 Trget
- Area code: 052

Brgod (Italian: Bergodi) is a village in the municipality of Raša, Istria in Croatia.

== Demographics ==
According to the 2021 census, its population was 174.
