= Kunj, Istria County =

Kunj
- Village
- Location within Croatia
- Coordinates: 45.0719968°N 14.0196536°E
- Country: Croatia
- County: Istria County
- Municipality: Raša

Area
  - Total: 2.3 sq mi (6.0 km^{2})

Population (2021)
  - Total: 81
  - Density: 35/sq mi (14/km^{2})
- Time zone: UTC+1 (CET)
  - Summer (DST): UTC+2 (CEST)
- Postal code: 52220 Labin
- Area code: 052

Kunj is a village in the municipality of Raša, Istria in Croatia.

== Demographics ==
According to the 2021 census, its population was 81.
