= Ravni, Istria County =

Ravni Ravine
- Village
- Location within Croatia
- Coordinates: 44.9982959°N 14.1491714°E
- Country: Croatia
- County: Istria County
- Municipality: Raša

Area
  - Total: 0.73 sq mi (1.9 km^{2})

Population (2021)
  - Total: 64
  - Density: 87/sq mi (34/km^{2})
- Time zone: UTC+1 (CET)
  - Summer (DST): UTC+2 (CEST)
- Postal code: 52220 Labin
- Area code: 052

Ravni (Italian: Ravine) is a village in the municipality of Raša, Istria in Croatia.

== Demographics ==
According to the 2021 census, its population was 64.
