= Via Flavia =

Ancient Roman road

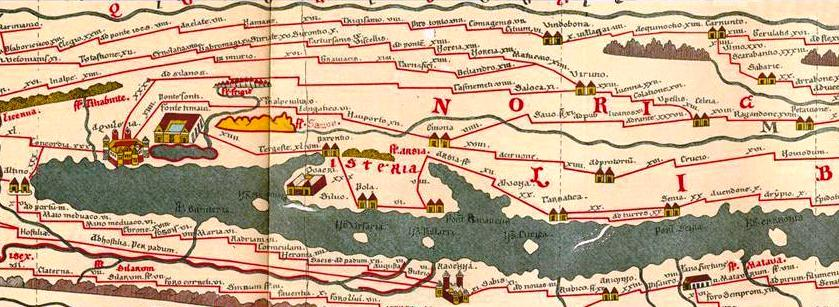
Venezia Julia, Slovenia, Istria in the Tabula Peutingeriana

The Via Flavia was an ancient Roman road which connected Trieste (ancient Tergeste) to Dalmatia, running across the Istrian coast. It was constructed during the reign of emperor Vespasian, in 78/79 AD.

After Trieste, it crossed the Rižana, the Dragonja/Dragogna (Timavo) and, at Ponte Porton, the biggest Istrian river, the Mirna/Quieto (Ningus). Then it reached the Limski Kanal/Canale Leme (Limes), Dvigrad Due Castelli, Bale (Valle), Vodnjan (Dignano) and Pula/Pola (Pola), after which it turned towards Visače (Nesactium), reaching the Raša/Arsa (Arsia) River, crossing it, and continuing as a local road through Labin (Albona) and Plomin (Fianona) as far as Kastav/Castua (Castra), where it joined at an angle with the Via Annia.
