= Drenje, Istria County =

Drenje Dregne
- Village
- Location within Croatia
- Country: Croatia
- County: Istria County
- Municipality: Raša

Area
  - Total: 1.9 sq mi (5.0 km^{2})

Population (2021)
  - Total: 49
  - Density: 25/sq mi (9.8/km^{2})
- Time zone: UTC+1 (CET)
  - Summer (DST): UTC+2 (CEST)
- Postal code: 52220 Labin
- Area code: 052

Drenje (Italian: Dregne) is a small hamlet in Istria County, Croatia. It is situated just off the coast of the Gulf of Quarnero in the Adriatic Sea. It is part of the Labinština peninsula in Istria.

== Demographics ==
According to the 2021 census, its population was 49.
