= Nesactium =

Ancient Histri village

Coordinates: 44°55′0″N 13°58′11″E

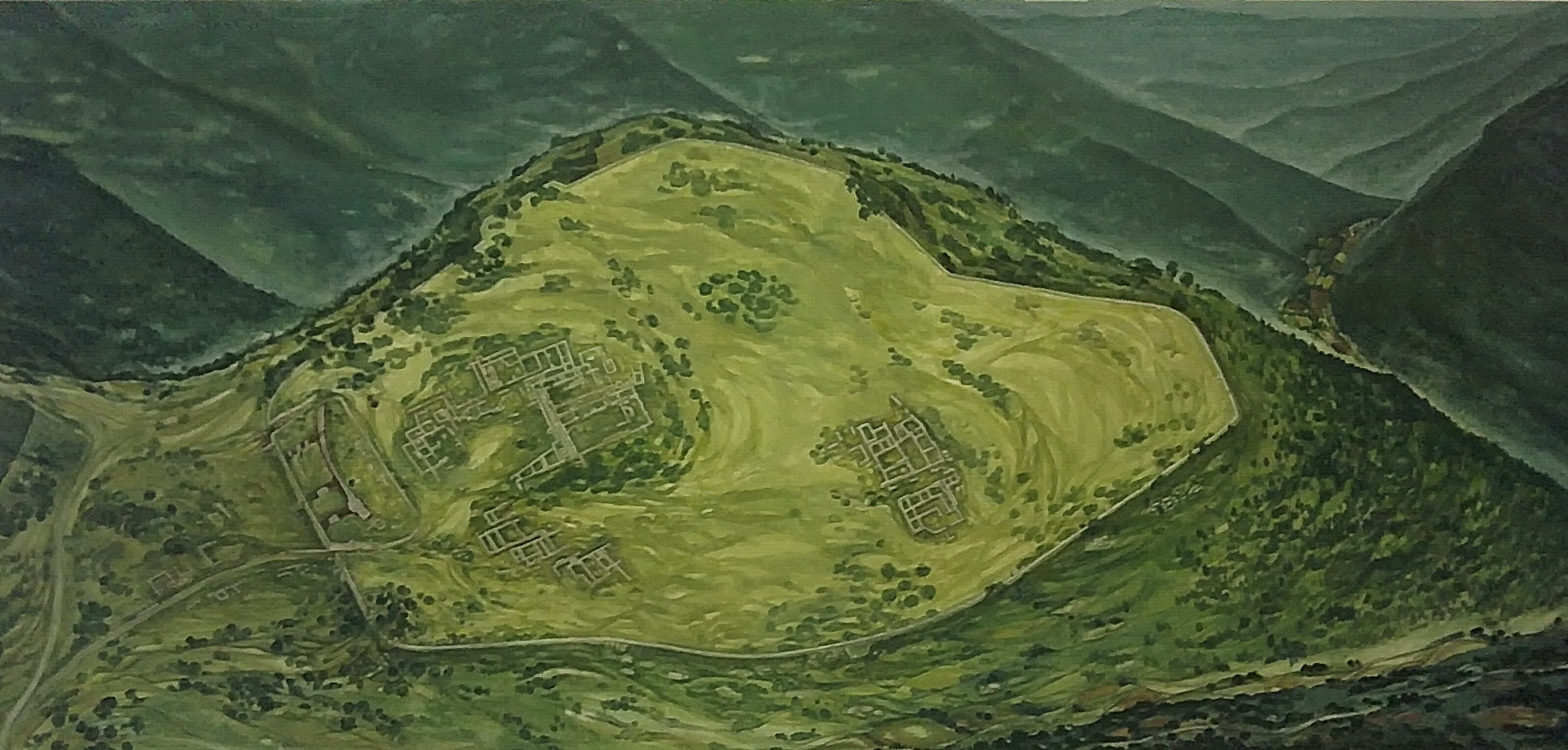
Nesactium

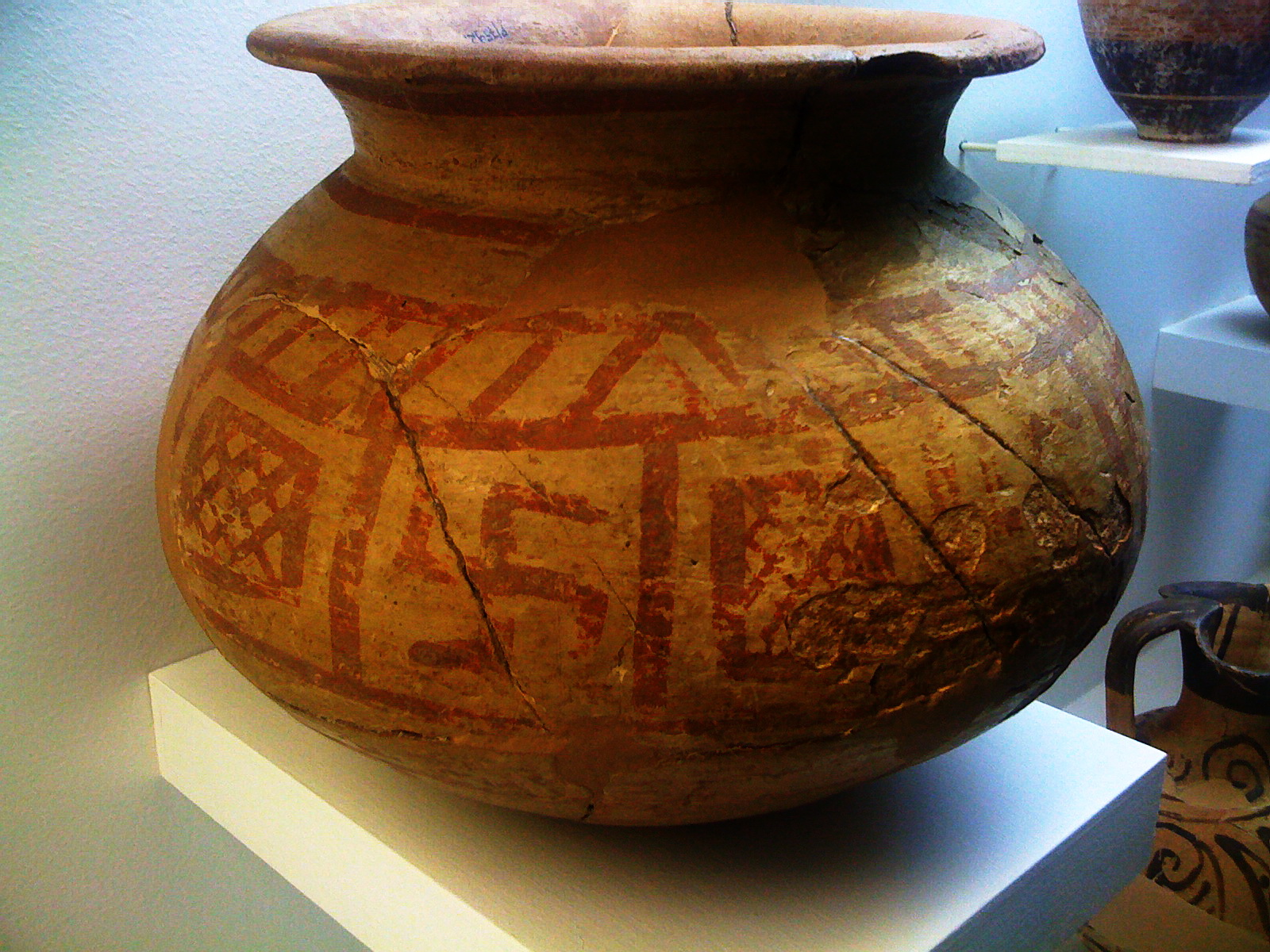
Nesactium, Histrian vase

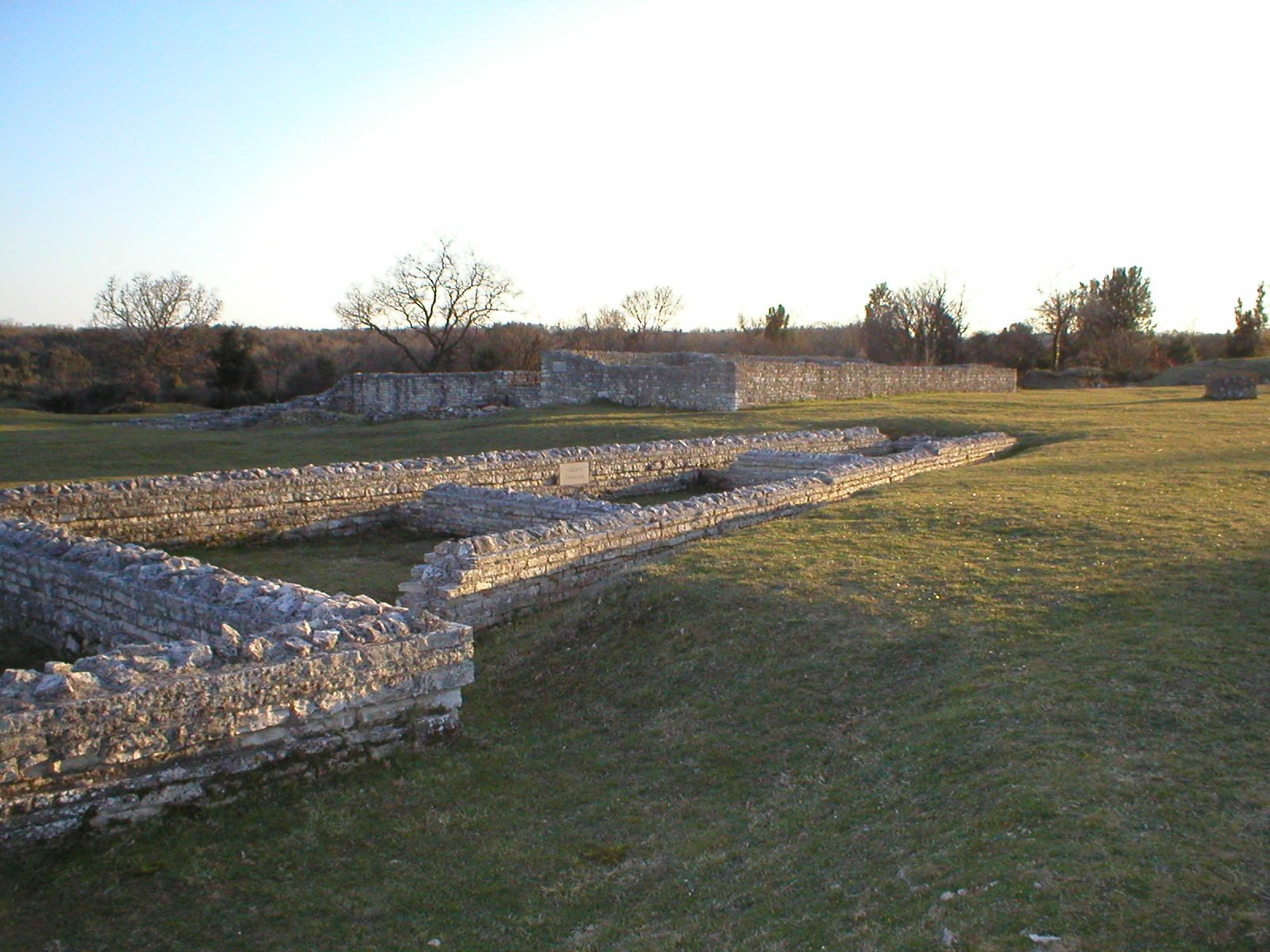
Ruins of Nesactium

Nesactium (Istrian dialect: Vizače, Croatian: Nezakcij, Italian: Nesazio) was the capital of the Histri tribe and later a Roman city. Its remains are located in southern Istria, Croatia, between the villages of Muntić and Valtura.

== History ==
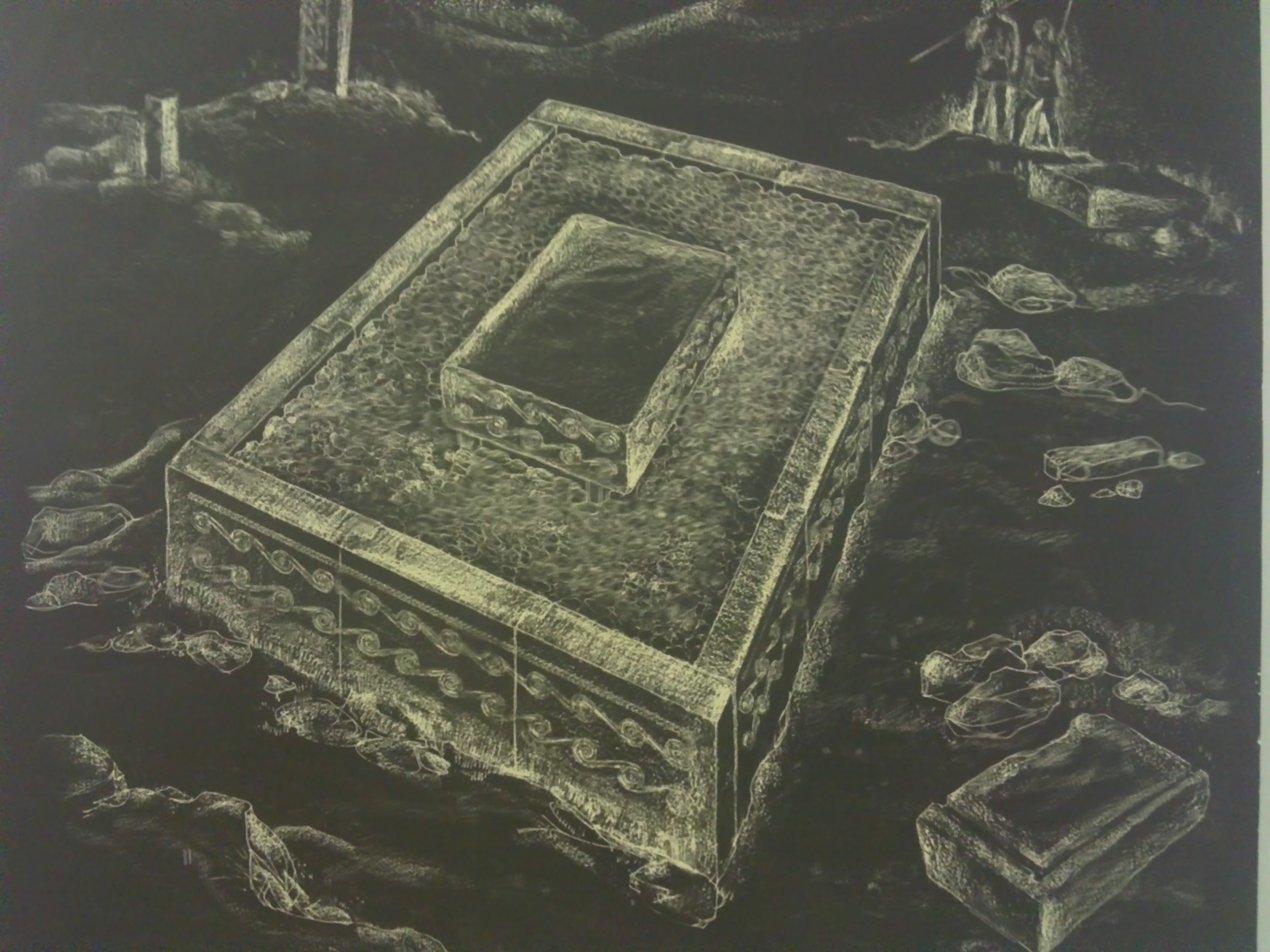
Histrian tomb from Nesactium. Reconstruction in the historical museum in Pola

In pre-Roman times the Histri inhabited the Istrian peninsula. They were connected to the prehistoric Castellieri culture and some theories state a later Celtic influence. It is believed that their main economic activities were trade and piracy all over the ancient Mediterranean Sea.

At one time the Histri were ruled by their legendary king Epulon.

In 177 BC the town was conquered by the Romans and destroyed. Rebuilt upon the original Histrian pattern, it was a Roman town until 46–45 BC, when the Ancient Greek colony Polai was elevated to Pietas Iulia, today Pula. The town was located on the ancient road Via Flavia, which connected Trieste to Dalmatia. The area was abandoned by the Romans in the 6th century, following the Avaro-Slav invasions. Its Histro-Roman walls still remain.

== History of research ==
Kristina Mihovilić, who for many years was curator at the Archaeological Museum of Istria in Pula and excavator of the Bronze Age settlement of Monkodonja, is particularly linked to the research of Nesactium and the Histrians.

== Literature ==
Kristina Mihovilić, Histri u Istri: Željezno doba Istre/ Gli Istri in Istria: L‘età del ferro in Istria/ The Histri in Istria: The Iron Age in Istria. Monografije i katalozi 23/2, Arheološki muzej Istre, Pula 2013.

Kristina Mihovilić, Nezakcij: prapovijesni nalazi 1900. - 1953./ Nesactium: Prehistoric Finds 1900-1953. Monografije i katalozi 11, Arheološki muzej Istre, Pula 2001.

Kristina Mihovilić, Nezakcij: nalaz grobnice 1981. godine/ Nesactium: the Discovery of a Grave Vault in 1981. Monografije i katalozi 6, Arheološki muzej Istre, Pula 1996.
