= Raša (river) =

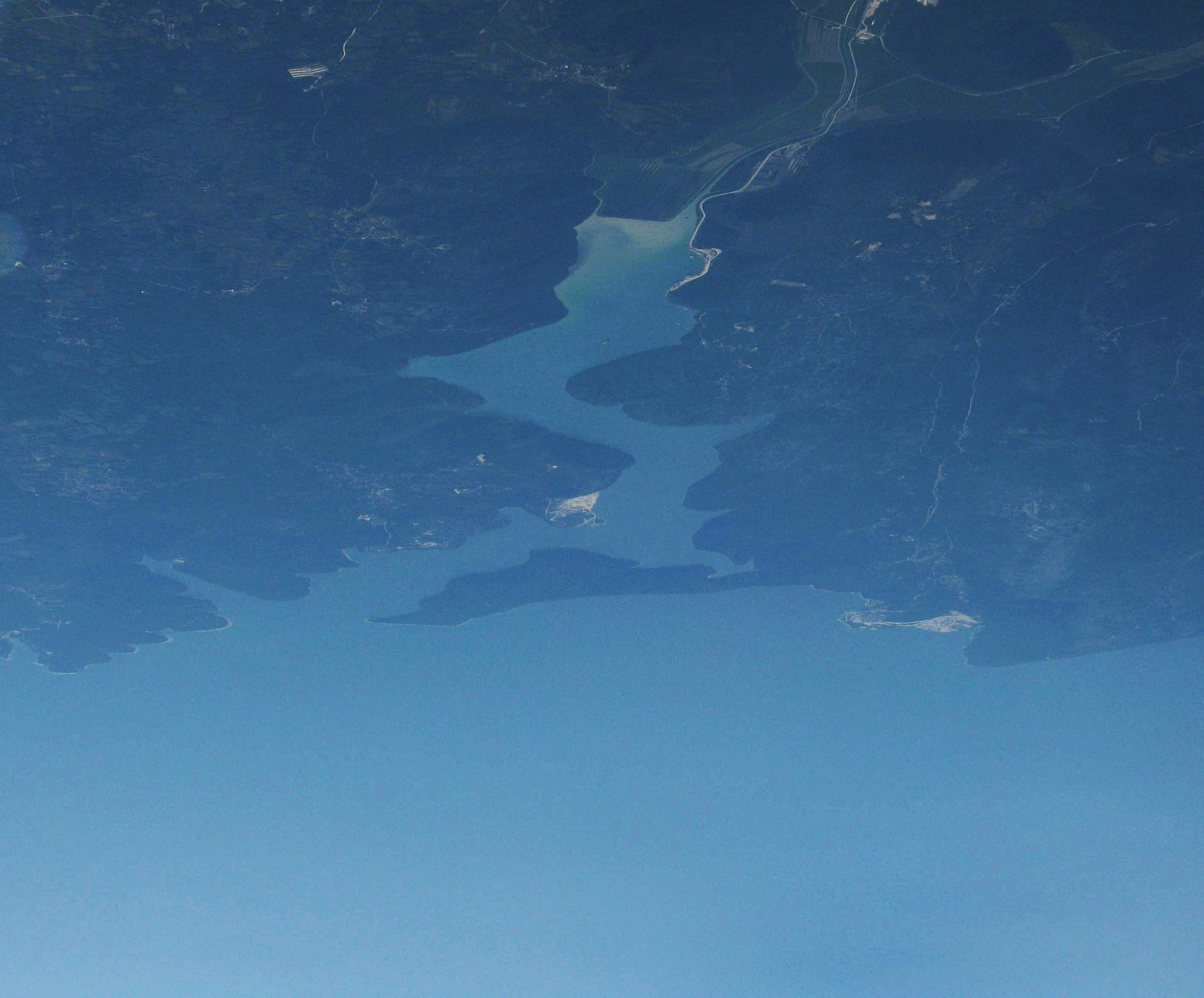
- Raška Inlet

Location
- Country: Croatia

Physical characteristics
- Source
  - location: Near Pićan
- Mouth
  - location: Adriatic Sea
  - coordinates: 45.0330°N 14.0471°E
- Length: 23 km (14 mi)
- Basin size: 279 km^{2} (108 sq mi)

Basin features
- Tributaries
  - left: Krapanski Potok
  - right: Karbuna

The Raša (Latin: Arsia, Italian: Arsa) in Croatian Istria is a major river of Croatia's Istria County. It is 23 kilometres (14 mi) long, and its basin covers an area of 279 km^{2} (108 sq mi). Its mouth is in the long ria of Raša Bay (Croatian: Raški zaljev, formerly Italian: Porto d'Arsia), which is a drowned river valley scoured out when world sea levels fell, then drowned by the rising waters of the post-glacial era. The Raša rises in springs near Pićan and flows south through a steep-sided valley before opening into the head of the Adriatic Sea. The river, although short in length, has an ancient history as a border.

== Border river ==
By Roman times, the Arsia, as it was called in Latin, constituted the border between the Histri, who lived west of its banks, and the Liburni on the coast to the east, with the Iapydes in the upcountry valley behind them. After the Romans conquered the fierce and piratical Histri in 177 BC, the Arsia formed the limes of Roman territory in coastal Istria for a generation, until the gap between the Arsia and the northernmost Roman outposts in Illyria was closed in 129; for long afterwards it divided Italia and its regio X, from Illyricum, according to the divisions ratified by Augustus. The 8th-century Irish monk and geographer Dicuil, following his late Latin sources for the geographical summary De mensura Orbis terrae, gives the northeastern boundary of Italia as flumen Arsia.

The Roman road Via Flavia, reaching from Tergeste (Trieste) into Istria came to an end at the crossing of the Arsia; beyond, it continued into Dalmatia as a local road that linked to Via Gemina.

In the early 10th century Tomislav of Croatia ruled a state that ran from the Adriatic to the Drava, and from the Raša, as it was now being called, to the Drina. In the 13th century, the territory on the east bank was administered by the counts of Gorizia, while that on the west was ruled by the patriarchs of Aquileia. After centuries of Venetian rule over all of Istria to the Raša, the Raša became the border between Napoleon's Kingdom of Italy and the Austrian Empire; following Napoleon's downfall, Austria gained all of Istria and the river became the border between two Austrian provinces.

The planned city of Raša (Italian: Arsia), on the tributary Krapanski Potok of the river in the inner part of the Raška Inlet, was constructed in 1936–1937 as Arsia on drained wetlands to gain arable land for farming and to serve expanding coal mining operations, as part of Mussolini's urban colonization and Italianization of Istria. The village of Barban is the other major settlement near the river.
