= Krapan =

Krapan Carpano
- Village
- Location within Croatia
- Coordinates: 45.0891691°N 14.0922107°E
- Country: Croatia
- County: Istria County
- Municipality: Raša

Area
  - Total: 0.15 sq mi (0.4 km^{2})

Population (2021)
  - Total: 117
  - Density: 760/sq mi (290/km^{2})
- Time zone: UTC+1 (CET)
  - Summer (DST): UTC+2 (CEST)
- Postal code: 52223 Raša
- Area code: 052

Krapan (Italian: Carpano) is a village in the municipality of Raša, Istria in Croatia.

== Demographics ==
According to the 2021 census, its population was 117.
