= Raša, Istria County =

Raša Arsia
- Municipality
- Raša Municipality
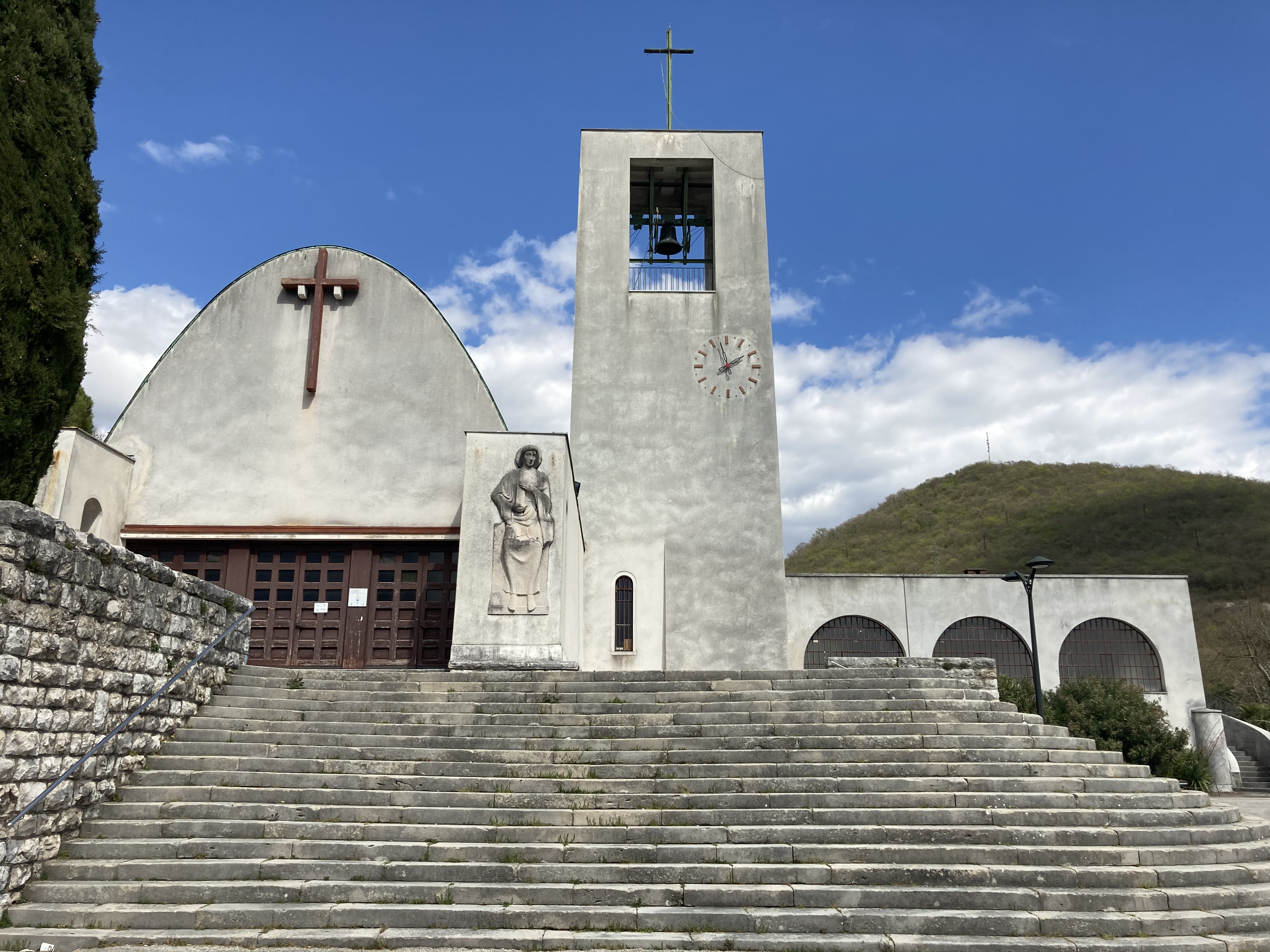
- St. Barbara parish in Raša

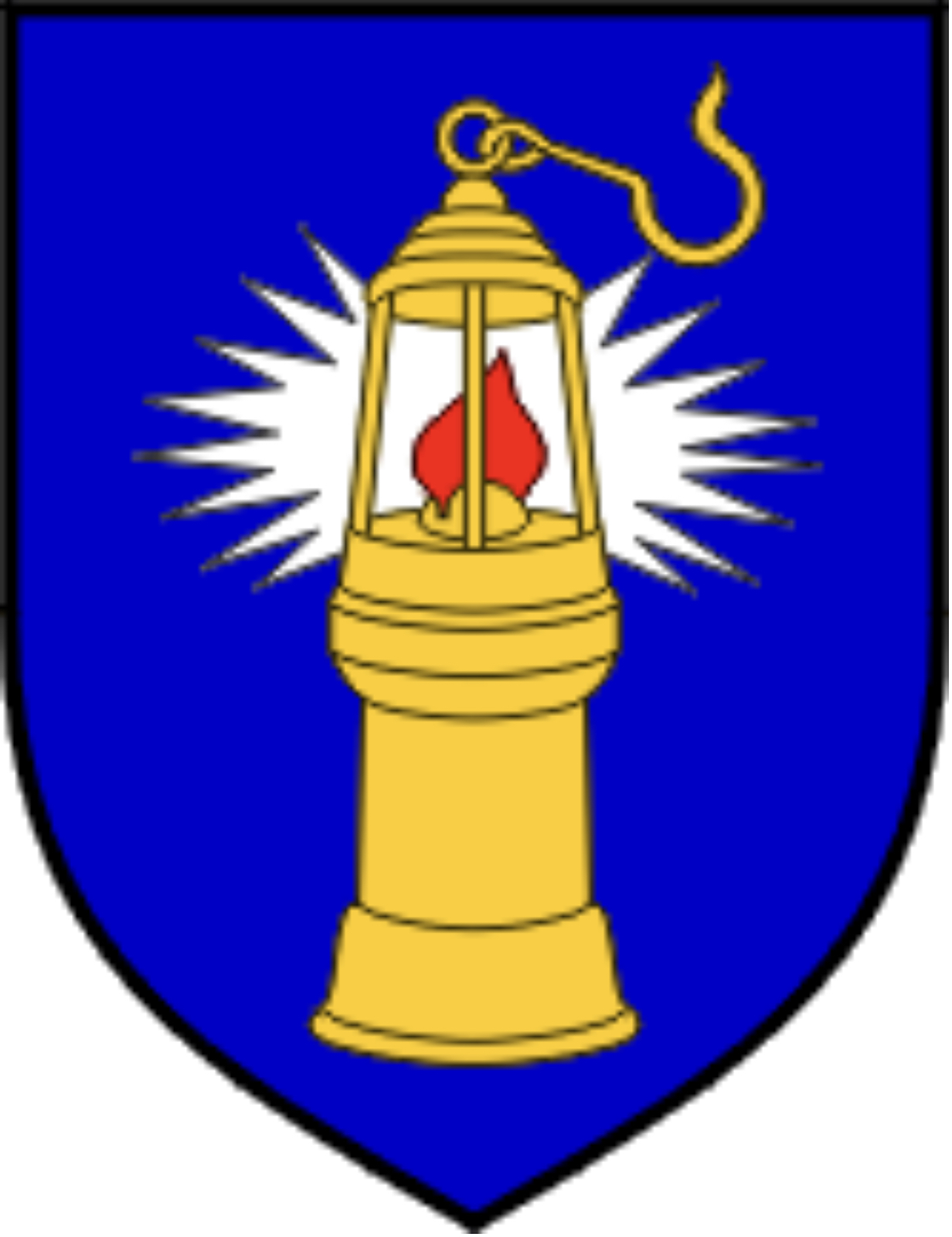
- Flag Coat of arms

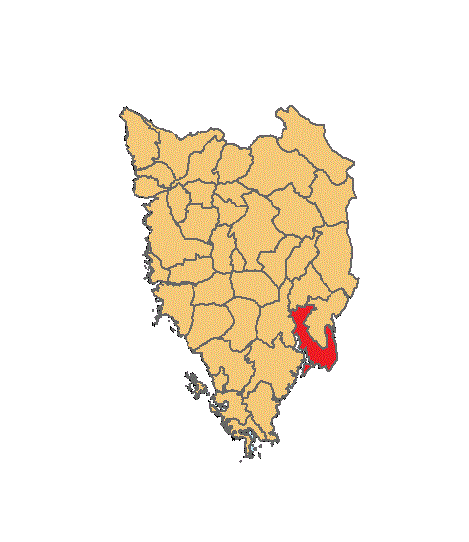
- Location of Raša in Istria
- Interactive map of Raša
- Location within Croatia
- Coordinates: 45°05′N 14°05′E
- Country: Croatia
- County: Istria County

Area
  - Municipality: 31.0 sq mi (80.4 km^{2})
  - Urban: 0.58 sq mi (1.5 km^{2})
- Elevation: 33 ft (10 m)

Population (2021)
  - Municipality: 2,809
  - Density: 90.5/sq mi (34.9/km^{2})
  - Urban: 1,184
  - Urban density: 2,000/sq mi (790/km^{2})
- Time zone: UTC+1 (CET)
  - Summer (DST): UTC+2 (CEST)
- Postal code: 52220 Labin
- Vehicle registration: PU
- Municipality day: November 4
- Patron saints: St. Barbara
- Website: rasa.hr

Raša (Italian: Arsia, Chakavian: Aršija) is a settlement and a municipality in Istria, Croatia. The settlement was created in the 1930s as a coal mining town under the Italian government.

== Location ==
Raša stands in the south-eastern part of Istria peninsula, in the inner part of the Raška Inlet, 4.5 kilometres (2.8 mi) southwest of Labin. Its elevation is 10 m (33 ft). It was named after the eponym Raša river.

It is situated in the valley of the Krapanski Potok, a tributary of the river Raša. The former village of Krapan is just upstream, today dominated by a ceramics manufacture.

== History ==
=== Before Raša ===
Local mining activity existed in the 17th century, during the period of Venetian administration. At that time, the place was called Krapan. During the 18th century, some forty miners were producing about 560 tons of coal per year. With the 19th century's global industrialization and especially the expansion of the steam engine, coal mines developed significantly. By the time of the Austrian administration, late 19th and early 20th century, approximately 1,500 workers were producing about 90,000 tons per year. Krapan had acquired numerous new facilities. The small church of St. Barabara (patroness of the miners) was built in 1905, shaped as an upturned coal wagon, with a bell tower looking like a miner's lamp and, on its facade, a stone embossed figure of St.Barbara by sculptor Ugo Carà from Trieste. It is a single nave church.
By 1936 under the Italian administration, production had increased to 735,610 tons of coal; it aimed for one million tons and about 7,000 employees. So the coal mine company (“Arsa” Società Anonima Carbonifera) and its successor A.Ca.I. (Azienda Carboni Italiani) decided to finance the construction of a suitable village.

=== Construction ===
The original name for the village was Liburnia; later, the name Arsia (Raša) prevailed after the eponymous river.

Raša was built as a "new town" during 1936-1937 as part of Mussolini's urban colonization of Istria. Planned and designed according to the rationalist principles by architect, Gustavo Pulitzer-Finali from Trieste, Italy, the mining town is organized along a linear axis connecting the Upper and Lower Raša. Lower Raša consists of houses for ordinary miners set along two parallel streets while Upper Raša is organized along three parallel streets with similar houses but slightly larger in size, designated for senior miners and supervisors. Smaller residential enclaves were organized throughout the elongated plan, one of which is "villette", a gated series of small urban villas designated for mining executives.

The town centre connecting the Lower and Upper Raša included a large square with hotels, post office, supermarket, movie theatre, pharmacy, administrative offices and small arcaded shops. Overlooking the square is the church of Santa Barbara (patron saint of miners). Centrally located are also the town hospital, football field, bocci terrain and swimming pool with diving tower and bowling alley.

More than 10,000 miners worked the mine from 1928 to 1966.

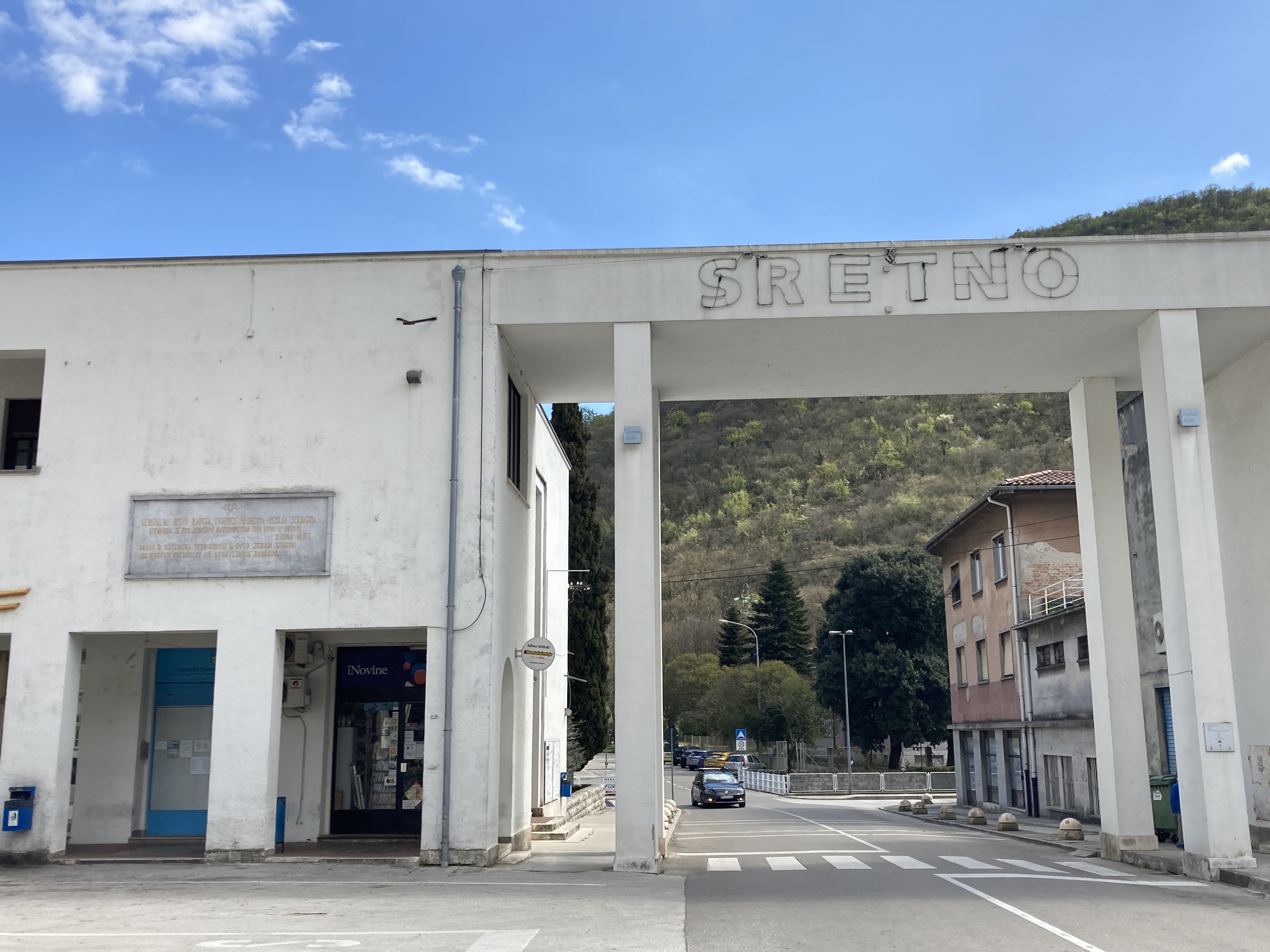
The miners' greeting "Sretno" on a portico over the main road

== Tourism ==
Decades after the mine's closure in 1966, Raša illustrates Italian rationalist industrial town planning from that period between the two world wars.

The municipality has invested €870,000 to refurbish the former coal mine as a tourist attraction. The new mining museum has opened in July 2023 after a year and a half of intensive renovation, with 1.5 kilometres of accessible tunnel.

== Demographics ==
According to the 2021 census, its population was 2,809, with 1,184 living in the village proper. At the 2011 census it was 3,183.

The municipality consists of the following 23 settlements:

- Barbići, population 55
- Brgod, population 174
- Brovinje, population 71
- Crni, population 20
- Drenje, population 49
- Koromačno, population 139
- Krapan, population 117
- Kunj, population 81
- Letajac, population 27
- Most-Raša, population 63
- Polje, population 19
- Raša, population 1,184
- Ravni, population 64
- Skitača, population 8
- Skvaranska, population 1
- Stanišovi, population 33
- Sveta Marina, population 49
- Sveti Bartul, population 265
- Sveti Lovreč Labinski, population 41
- Topid, population 140
- Trget, population 31
- Trgetari, population 49
- Viškovići, population 129
Raša: Population trends 1857–2021
v

population	2206	2439	2488	2900	2998	3435	3756	4872	6796	6549	6373	4821	4460	4124	3535	3183	2809
	1857	1869	1880	1890	1900	1910	1921	1931	1948	1953	1961	1971	1981	1991	2001	2011	2021

Sources: Croatian Bureau of Statistics publications

=== Language ===
Although though the Government of the Republic of Croatia does not guarantee official Croatian-Italian bilinguialism here, the statute of Raša itself does.
