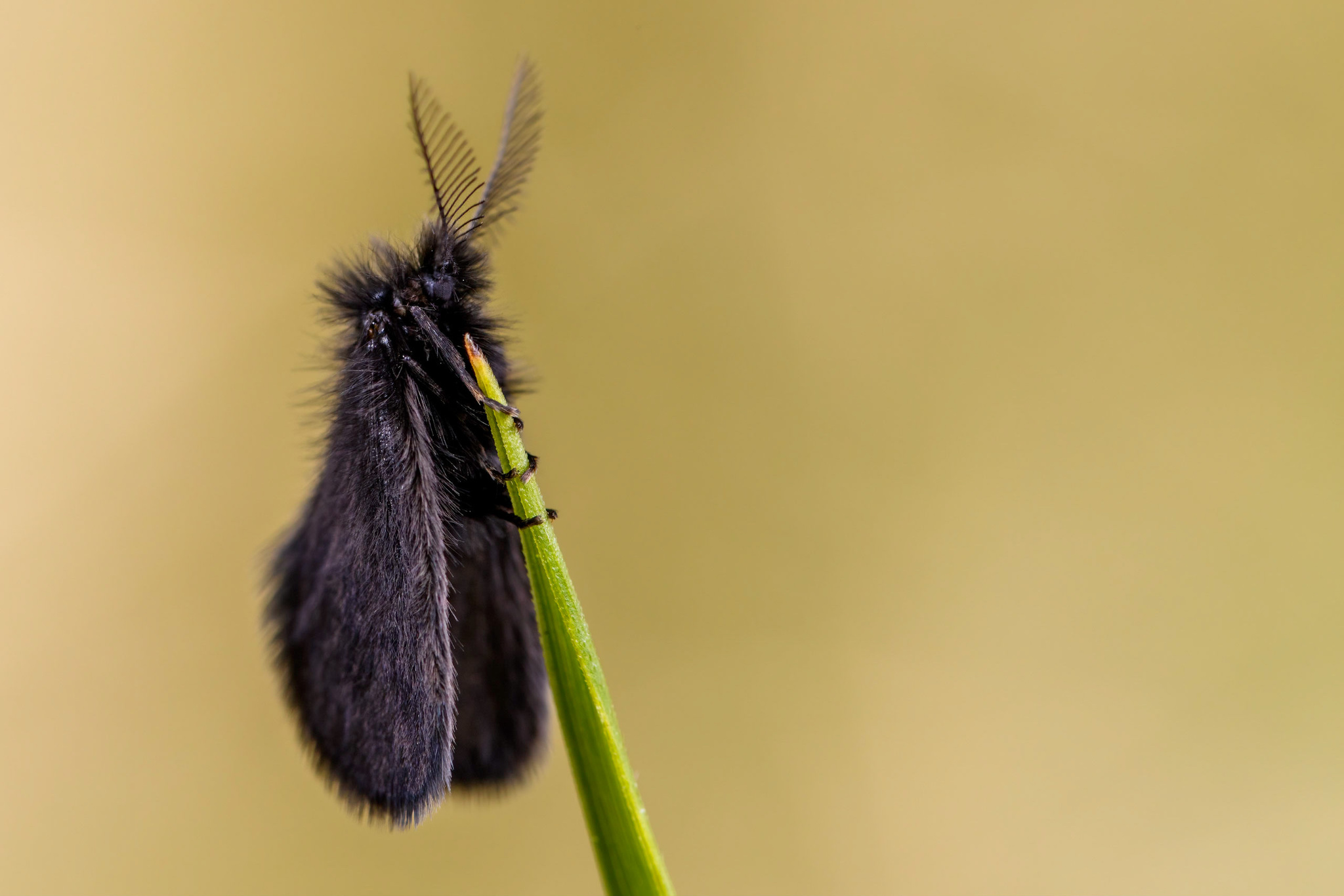
- Epichnopterix plumella

Scientific classification
- Kingdom: Animalia
- Phylum: Arthropoda
- Clade: Pancrustacea
- Class: Insecta
- Order: Lepidoptera
- Family: Psychidae
- Genus: Epichnopterix; Hübner, 1825

= Epichnopterix =

Genus of moths

Epichnopterix is a genus of moths belonging to the family Psychidae.

The species of this genus are found in Europe.

Selected species:

- Epichnopterix alpina Heylaerts, 1900
- Epichnopterix ardua (Mann, 1867)
- Epichnopterix plumella (Denis & Schiffermüller 1775)
