= Carl Heinrich Reutti =

German entomologist (1830–1895)

Carl Heinrich Reutti (1830 Villingen, Baden- 1895 Karlsruhe) was a German entomologist who specialised in Lepidoptera . He wrote (1853) Lepidopteren-Fauna Badens.Beiträge zur Rheinischen Naturgeschichte 3_3: 1-216 pdf in which he described Epichnopterix sieboldii. Other works are

- (1895) Über die Hypenodes-Arten Entomologische Zeitung Stettin 56: 209-212.pdf
- (1889): Lepidopteren-Fauna des Grossherzogthums Baden - Schluss Entomologische Zeitschrift 3: 117.pdf
