= Valtura =

Valtura Altura
- Village
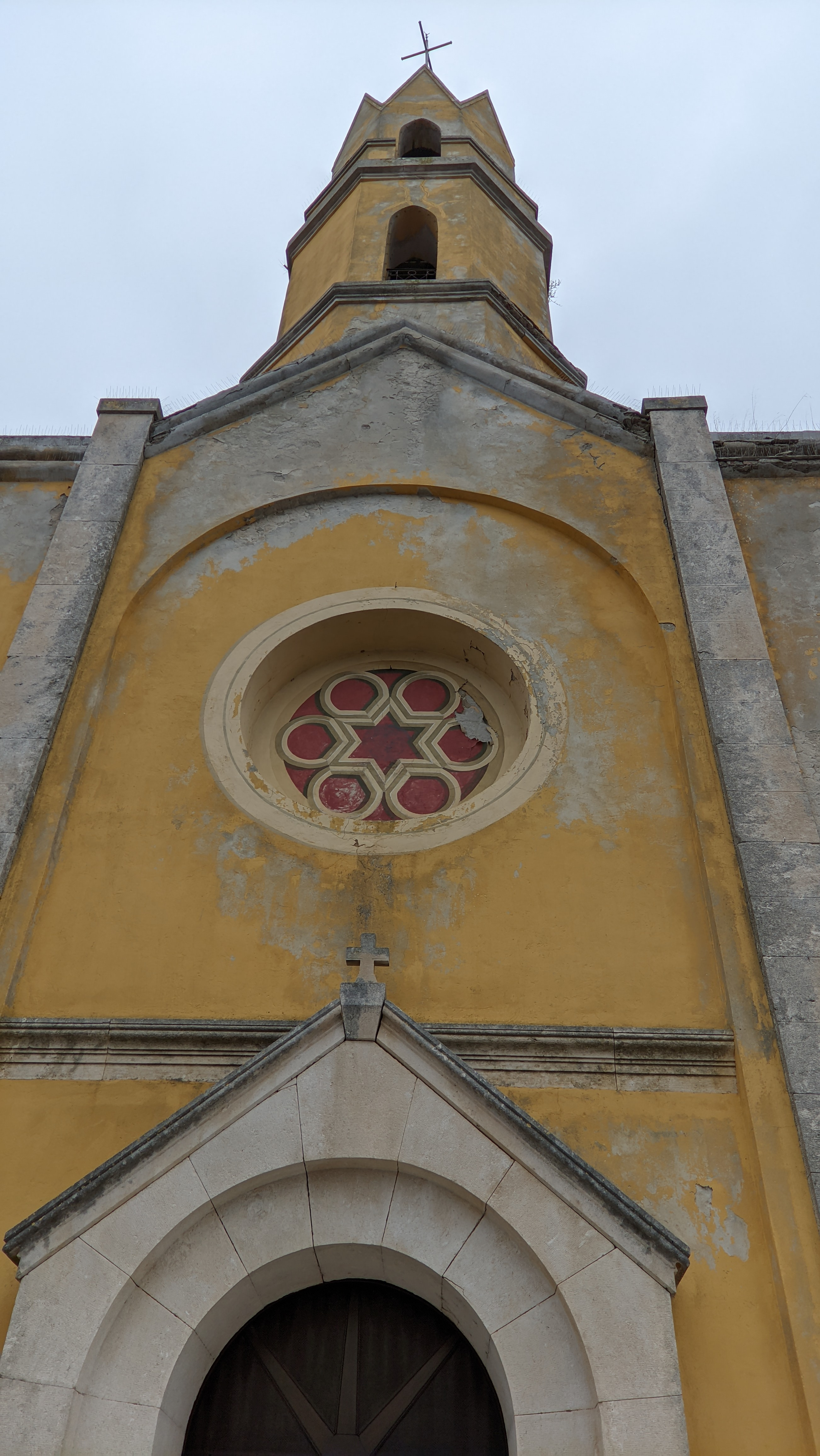

- Location within Croatia
- Coordinates: 45°03′55″N 14°01′02″E
- Country: Croatia
- County: Istria County
- Municipality: Ližnjan

Area
  - Total: 10.0 sq mi (25.8 km^{2})

Population (2021)
  - Total: 773
  - Density: 77.6/sq mi (30.0/km^{2})
- Time zone: UTC+1 (CET)
  - Summer (DST): UTC+2 (CEST)
- Postal code: 52100 Pula
- Area code: 052

Valtura (Italian: Altura) is a village in the municipality of Ližnjan-Lisignano, in northern Istria in Croatia.

== Demographics ==
According to the 2021 census, its population was 773. In 2001 it had a population of 636.
