= Histri =

Ancient people of the Istrian peninsula

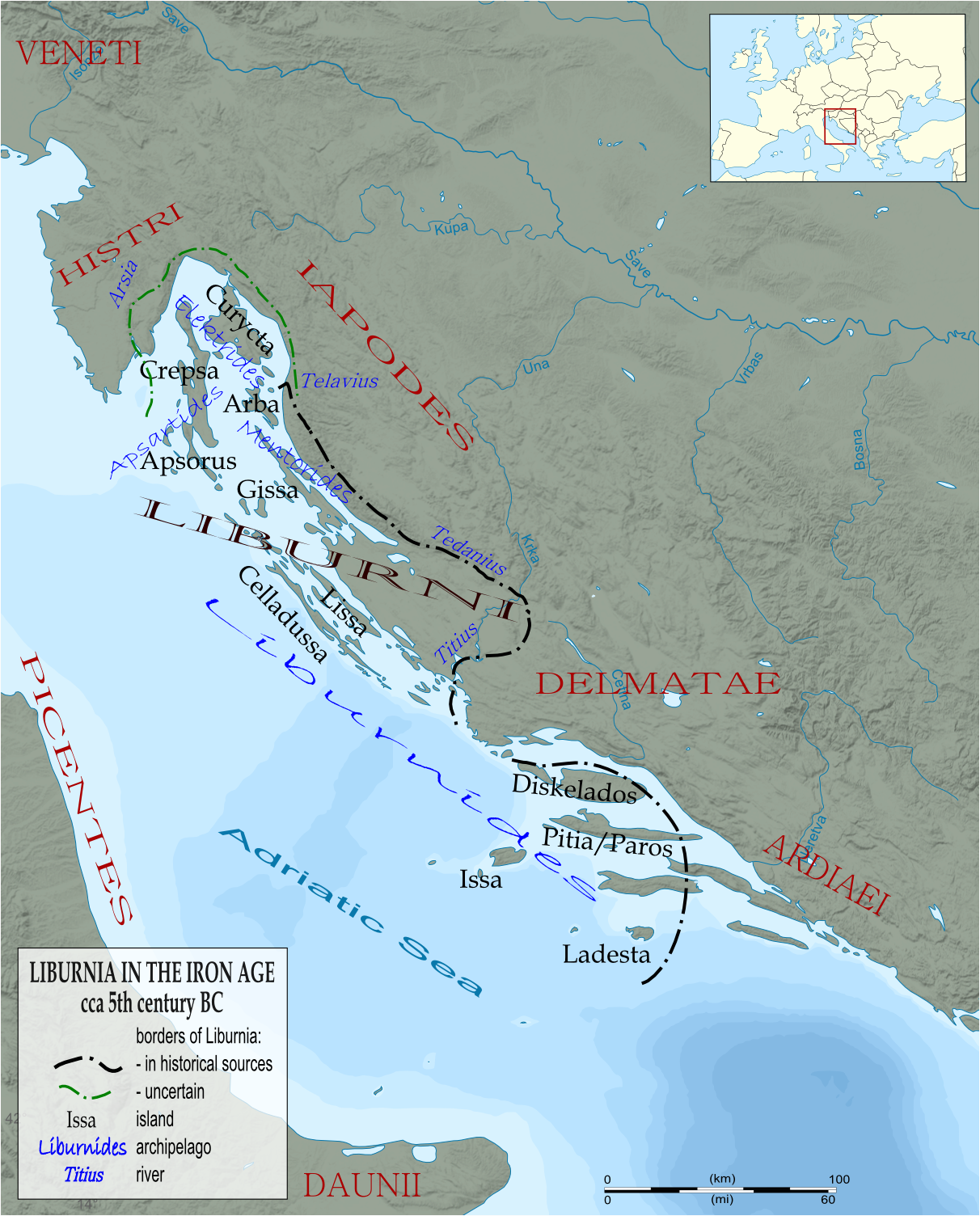
Histri in the Iron Age, c. 5th century BC.

The Histri or Istri (Ancient Greek: Ἴστροι) were an ancient people inhabiting the Istrian Peninsula, to which they gave the name Histria. Their territory stretched to the neighbouring Gulf of Trieste and bordered the Iapodes in the hinterland of Tarsatica. The Histri formed a kingdom.

== Description ==
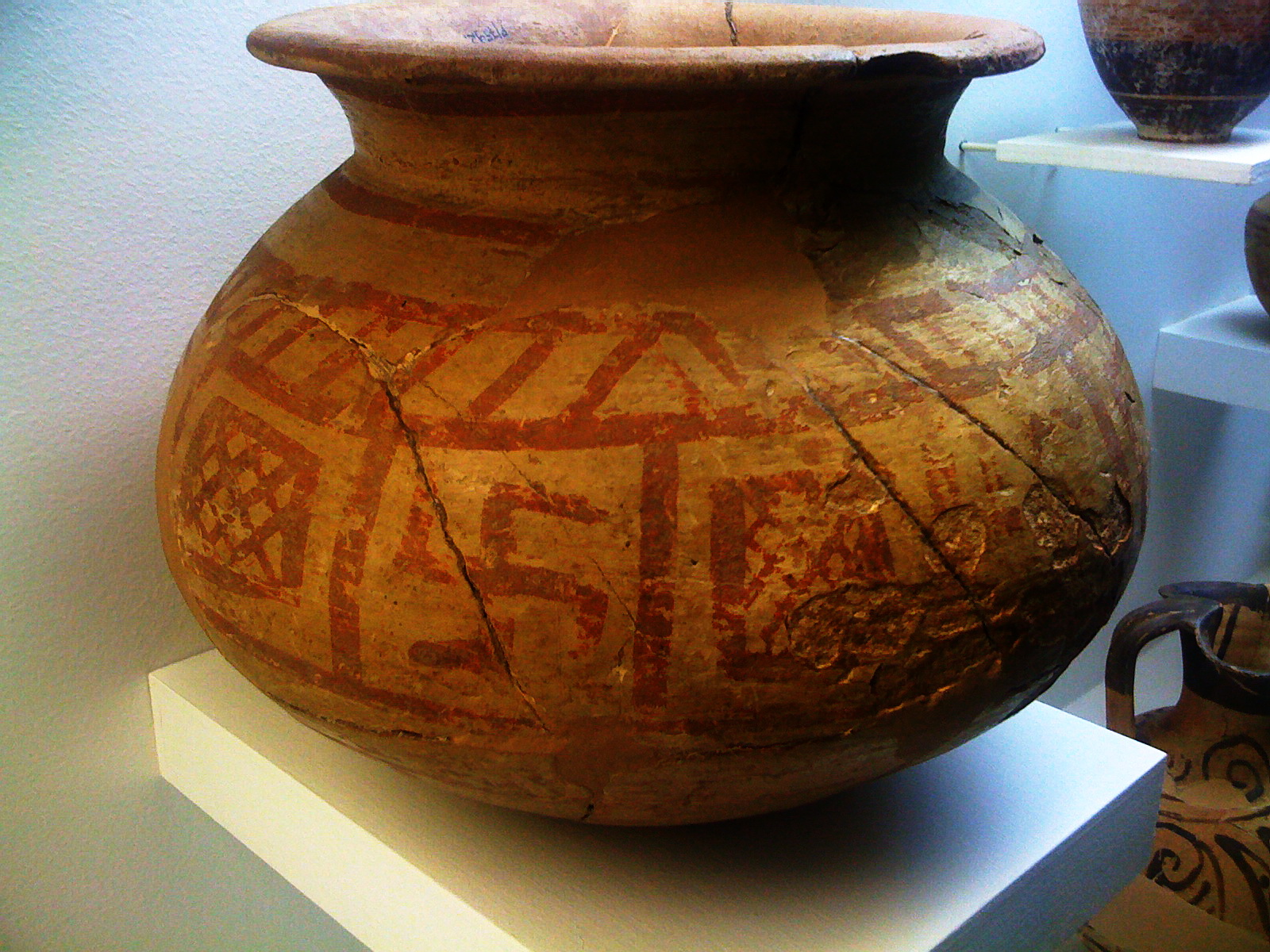
Histrian vase from Nesactium

They are classified in some sources as a Venetic tribe, with some ties with the Illyrians, or a purely Illyrian tribe. The Histri are also described as Thracians; an orientation includes them in the Liburnian linguistic area.

Since they inhabited the Istrian peninsula, they had more intensive trade and cultural contacts with the Mediterranean world, particularly central and southern Italy.

The Romans described the Histri as a fierce tribe of pirates, protected by the difficult navigation of their rocky coasts. An account stated that this tribe was first in the northern Adriatic area to be threatened by the Roman imperialism and to start a war. It took two military campaigns for the Romans to finally subdue them in 177 BC.

In the Augustan age the most of Istria was then called, together with the Venetian part, the X Roman region of Venetia et Histria: the ancient definition of the northeastern border of Italy. Dante Alighieri refers to it as well; the eastern border of Italy per ancient definition is the river Arsia.

== See also ==
- Castellieri culture
- Nesactium
