= Kilometres per hour =

Unit of speed

kilometre per hour
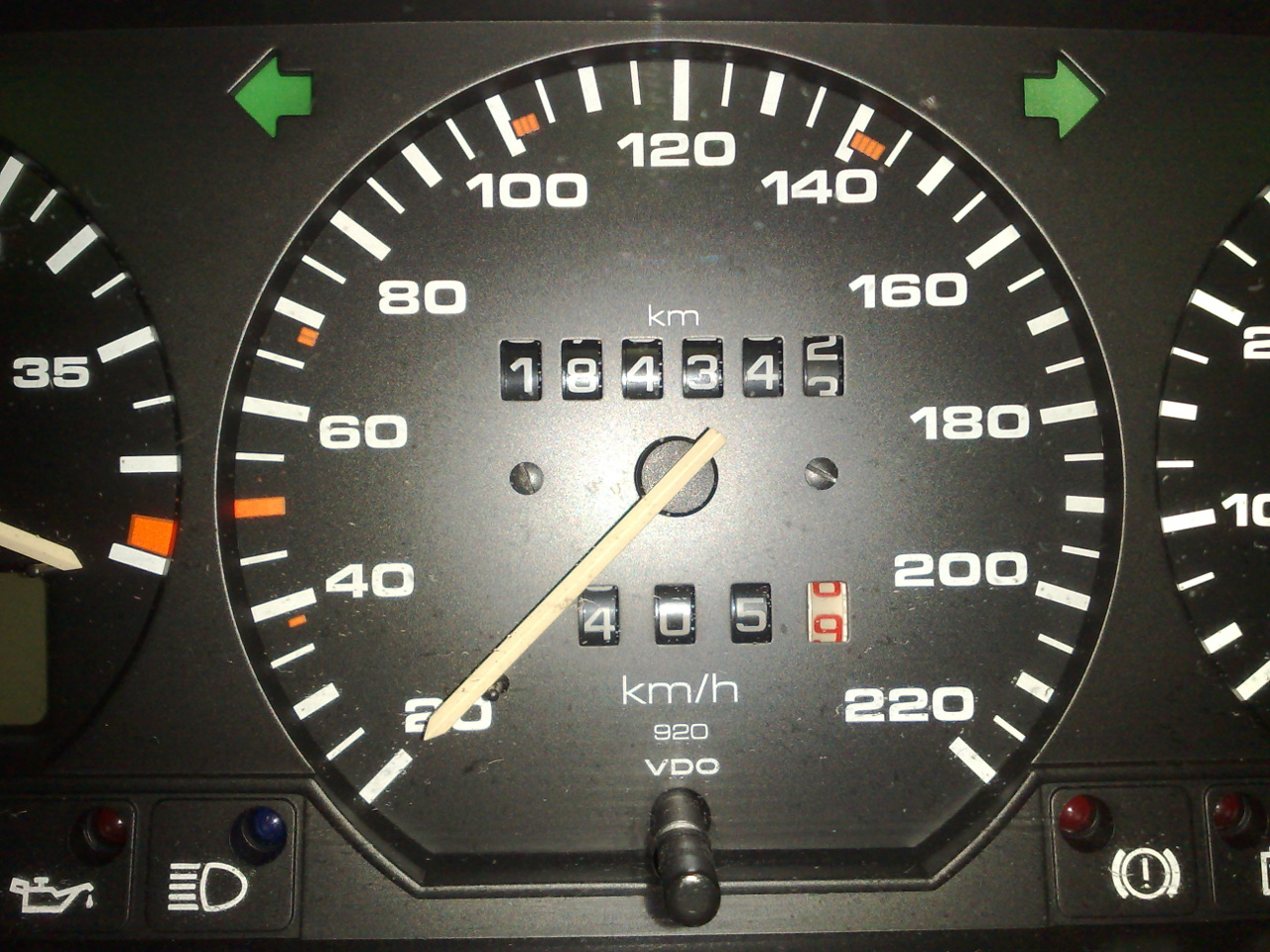
- A car speedometer that indicates measured speed in kilometres per hour.

General information
- Unit system: derived
- Unit of: speed
- Symbol: km/h

Conversions
1 km/h in ...	... is equal to ...
- mph: ≈ 0.621371
- m/s: = 0.27̅
- kn: ≈ 0.539957
- ft/s: ≈ 0.911344

The kilometre per hour (alternatively spelt kilometer per hour; SI symbol: km/h; abbreviations: kph, kmph, km/hr) is a unit of speed, expressing the number of kilometres travelled in one hour.

== History ==
Although the metre was formally defined in 1799, the term "kilometres per hour" did not come into immediate use – the myriametre (10,000 metres) and myriametre per hour were preferred to kilometres and kilometres per hour. In 1802 the term "myriamètres par heure" appeared in French literature. The Dutch on the other hand adopted the kilometre in 1817 but gave it the local name of the mijl (Dutch mile).

== Notation history ==
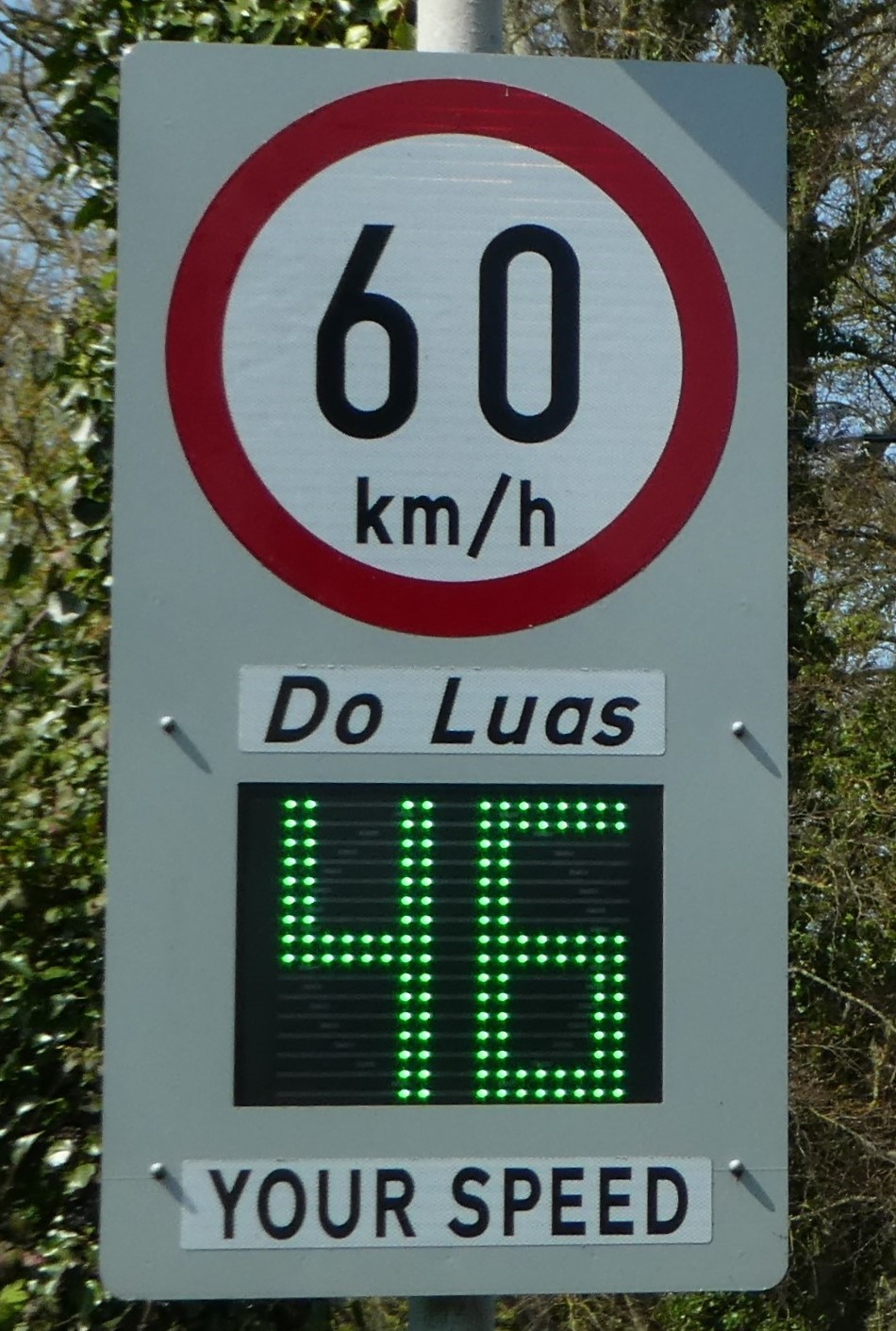
Speed limit sign in the Republic of Ireland, using "km/h."

The SI representations, classified as symbols, are "km/h", "km h^{−1}" and "km·h^{−1}". Several other abbreviations of "kilometres per hour" have been used since the term was introduced and many are still in use today; for example, dictionaries list "kph", "kmph" and "km/hr" as English abbreviations. While these forms remain widely used, the International Bureau of Weights and Measures uses "km/h" in describing the definition and use of the International System of Units. The entries for "kph" and "kmph" in the Oxford Advanced Learner's Dictionary state that "the correct scientific unit is km/h and this is the generally preferred form".

=== Abbreviations ===
Abbreviations for "kilometres per hour" did not appear in the English language until the late nineteenth century.

The kilometre, a unit of length, first appeared in English in 1810, and the compound unit of speed "kilometers per hour" was in use in the US by 1866. "Kilometres per hour" did not begin to be abbreviated in print until many years later, with several different abbreviations existing near-contemporaneously.

- 1889: "k. p. h."
- 1895: "km:h"
- 1898: "km/h"
- 1899: "km./hr."
- 1900: "kms./hr."
- 1902: "k.m.p.h."
- 1903: "KMph."
- 1910: "km ph"
- 1911: "K.P.H."
- 1914: "km. hr."
- 1915: "km/hour"
- 1915: "km.-hr."
- 1916: "km. per hour"
- 1921: "kms/hr."
- 1922: "Kmph"
- 1927: "kmph."
- 1933: "KPH"
- 1939: "kmph"
- 1940: "KMPH"

With no central authority to dictate the rules for abbreviations, various publishing houses and standards bodies have their own rules that dictate whether to use upper-case letters, lower-case letters, periods and so on, reflecting both changes in fashion and the image of the publishing house concerned, In contrast to the "symbols" designated for use with the SI system, news organisations such as Reuters and The Economist require "kph".

In informal Australian usage, km/h is more commonly pronounced "kays" or "kays an hour". In military usage, "klicks" is used, though written as km/h.

=== Unit symbols ===
In 1879, four years after the signing of the Treaty of the Metre, the International Committee for Weights and Measures (CIPM) proposed a range of symbols for the various metric units then under the auspices of the General Conference on Weights and Measures (CGPM). Among these were the use of the symbol "km" for "kilometre".

In 1948, as part of its preparatory work for the SI, the CGPM adopted symbols for many units of measure that did not have universally agreed symbols, one of which was the symbol "h" for "hours". At the same time the CGPM formalised the rules for combining units – quotients could be written in one of three formats resulting in "km/h", "km h^{−1}" and "km·h^{−1}" being valid representations of "kilometres per hour". The SI standards, which were MKS-based rather than CGS-based, were published in 1960 and have since then have been adopted by many authorities around the globe including academic publishers and legal authorities.

The SI explicitly states that unit symbols are not abbreviations and are to be written using a very specific set of rules. M. Danloux-Dumesnils provides the following justification for this distinction:

It has already been stated that, according to Maxwell, when we write down the result of a measurement, the numerical value multiplies the unit. Hence the name of the unit can be replaced by a kind of algebraic symbol, which is shorter and easier to use in formulae. This symbol is not merely an abbreviation but a symbol which, like chemical symbols, must be used in a precise and prescribed manner.

SI, and hence the use of "km/h" (or "km h^{−1}" or "km·h^{−1}") has now been adopted around the world in many areas related to health and safety and in metrology in addition to the SI unit metres per second ("m/s", "m s^{−1}" or "m·s^{−1}"). SI is also the preferred system of measure in academia and in education.

=== Non-SI abbreviations in official use ===
- km/j or km/jam (Indonesia and Malaysia)
- km/t or km/tim (Norway, Denmark and Sweden; also use km/h)
- kmph (Sri Lanka and India)
- กม./ชม. (Thailand; also uses km/hr)
- كم/س or كم/ساعة (Arabic-speaking countries, also use km/h)
- קמ"ש (Israel)
- км/ч (Russia and Belarus in a Russian-language context)
- км/г (Belarus in a Belarusian-language context)
- км/год (Ukraine)
- km/st (Azerbaijan)
- km/godz (Poland)

== Regulatory use ==
Speed limit units on traffic signs around the world: Kilometres per hour (km/h) Miles per hour (mph) Both No speed limit units

During the early years of the motor car, each country developed its own system of road signs. In 1968 the Vienna Convention on Road Signs and Signals was drawn up under the auspices of the United Nations Economic and Social Council to harmonise road signs across the world. Many countries have since signed the convention and adopted its proposals. Speed limits signs that are either directly authorised by the convention or have been influenced by the convention are shown below:

100 km/h sign following the most common implementation of the Vienna Convention style (Hungary)

Swedish 30 km/h speed limit – the yellow background provides a contrast in case snow covers the background against which one perceives the road sign.

Since the text "km/h" on this Irish speed limit sign is a symbol, not an abbreviation, it represents both "kilometres per hour" (English) and "ciliméadar san uair" (Irish)

60 km/h speed limit in Arabic numerals (below) and Arabic script (above) (UAE)

Waterways speed limit of 9 km/h (Finland)

Samoa uses both miles per hour and kilometres per hour

50 km/h sign in Mexico

Advisory 40 km/h sign in Norway

Advisory 50 km/h sign in Sweden

In 1972 the EU published a directive (overhauled in 1979 to take British and Irish interests into account) that required member states to abandon CGS-based units in favour of SI. The use of SI implicitly required that member states use "km/h" as the shorthand for "kilometres per hour" on official (Note: Until 2010, the directive covered "economic, public health, public safety or administrative purposes"; since then it covers all aspects of the EU internal market.) documents.

Another EU directive, published in 1975, regulates the layout of speedometers within the European Union, and requires the text "km/h" in all languages, even where that is not the natural abbreviation for the local version of "kilometres per hour". Examples include:

- Dutch: "kilometer per uur" ("hour" is "uur" – does not start with "h"),
- Portuguese: "quilómetro por hora" ("kilometre" is "quilómetro" – does not start with "k")
- Irish: "ciliméadar san uair"
- Greek: "χιλιόμετρα ανά ώρα" (a different script).

In 1988 the United States National Highway Traffic Safety Administration promulgated a rule stating that "MPH and/or km/h" were to be used in speedometer displays. On May 15, 2000, this was clarified to read "MPH, or MPH and km/h". However, the Federal Motor Vehicle Safety Standard number 101 ("Controls and Displays") allows "any combination of upper- and lowercase letters" to represent the units.

== Conversions ==
- 3.6 km/h ≡ 1 m/s, the SI unit of speed, metre per second
- 1 km/h = 0.27̅ m/s
- 1 km/h ≈ 0.62137 mph ≈ 0.91134 ft/s
- 1 kn ≡ 1.852 km/h (exactly)
- 1 mph ≡ 1.609344 km/h

Conversions between common units of speed
	m/s	km/h	mph (mi/h)	knot	fps (ft/s)
1 m/s =	1	3.600000	2.236936*	1.943844*	3.280840*
1 km/h =	0.277778*	1	0.621371*	0.539957*	0.911344*
1 mph (mi/h) =	0.44704	1.609344	1	0.868976*	1.466667*
1 knot =	0.514444*	1.852	1.150779*	1	1.687810*
1 fps (ft/s) =	0.3048	1.09728	0.681818*	0.592484*	1

(* = approximate values)

== See also ==
- Orders of magnitude (speed)
- Speed limits in the United Kingdom
- Speed limits in Canada
