= Sveti Martin =

Sveti Martin may refer to:

== Croatia ==
- Sveti Martin na Muri, a municipality in Međimurje County
- Sveti Martin, Buzet, a village in the municipality of Buzet
- Sveti Martin, Njivice, a hamlet of Njivice on Krk
- Sveti Martin, Sveta Nedelja, a village in the municipality of Sveta Nedelja

== Slovenia ==
- Dvorjane, a settlement in the Municipality of Duplek; known as Sveti Martin pri Vurbergu until 1955
- Šmartno na Pohorju, a settlement in the Municipality of Slovenska Bistrica; known as Sveti Martin na Pohorju until 1952
