= Josip Belušić =

Croatian inventor (1847–1905)

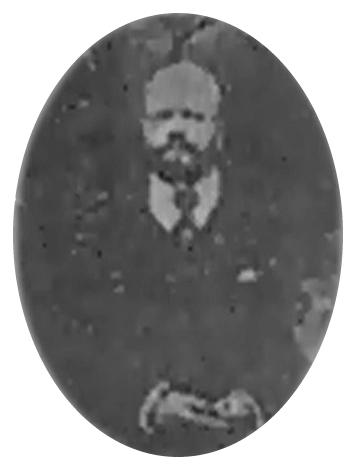
- Belušić in 1870s
- Born: 12 March 1847; Županići, Illyria, Austrian Empire
- Died: 8 January 1905 (aged 57); Austria-Hungary
- Education: University of Vienna
- Occupation: Inventor
- Known for: Inventing the speedometer

Josip Belušić (Croatian: [josip beluʃitɕ]; 12 March 1847 – 8 January 1905) was a Croatian inventor. He was born in the small settlement of Županići, in the region of Labin, Istria, and schooled in Pazin and Koper. Belušić continued his studies in Vienna, later resettling in Trieste before coming back to Istria, where he built his best known invention, the speedometer. After completing his studies, Belušić was employed as a professor of physics and mathematics at the Royal School of Koper. Later, he became director of the Maritime School of Castelnuovo, and was employed as an assistant professor in that institution.

In 1887 Belušić publicly experimented for the first time with his new invention, an electric speedometer. The invention was patented in Austria-Hungary under the name of Velocimeter.

Belušić exhibited his invention at the 1889 Exposition Universell in Paris, renaming it Controllore automatico per vetture. In the same year, the Municipality of Paris announced a public competition, and over 120 patents were registered to compete. His design won as the most precise and reliable and was accepted in June 1890. Within a year, a hundred devices were installed on Parisian carriages. In 1889, the Croatian newspaper Naša sloga predicted that "[Belušić's invention] will spread all over the world, and with it the name of our virtuous Istrian, friend and patriot."

Belušić's invention was also the first monitoring device in history, a forerunner of measuring monitoring devices used today in trucks, buses and taxis. Thus, Belušić is also credited as the father of monitoring and surveillance devices.

== Birth date, death date and nationality ==
Belušić was born on March 12, 1847, in the small village of Županići, on the outskirts of Labin, Istria, then part of the Austro-Hungarian Empire (now in Croatia). Županići is closer to Sveta Nedelja than Labin, and in fact today it is part of the former's municipality. There is some debate surrounding Belušić's place of death, with the Croatian Technical Encyclopedia leaning toward Trieste. He died on January 8, 1905. Belušić was 57 years old at the time of his death. He was born in Austria-Hungary.

== Early life and education ==
Little is known about Belušić's early life. He was born to Croatian Marin Belušić and Katarina Ružić, Serbian. Belušić spent his childhood in Županići, and was educated in nearby Pazin (5 miles northeast of Županići) and Koper (today Slovenia). In Pazin, the school's priests who tended to him were the first to notice his talent for the natural sciences. Belušić later enrolled in the Higher State Gymnasium of Koper.

The Koper high school had eight classes. The official languages of the institution were Italian and German. In the upper grades, there were also elective courses in the Slavic language. As a state grammar school, the institution was loyal to the Monarchy and the emperor. According to its curriculum, religious education, Italian, German, Latin and mathematics were studied in all eight grades. Elective courses included Slavic language, drawing and poetry, and starting from 1901 physical education. Slavonic as an elective course was introduced in the school programme in 1867.

In the school year 1865/66, Belušić completed the 6th grade. In that year, 161 students attended the grammar school, of which 149 were Italians and 12 were Slavs. According to the official census and the directory from that year, Josip Belušić was especially praised in the 6th grade, and his class finished with the best results in the class rank.

During his high school education, Belušić also earned himself a scholarship. He received 100 forints from the Province and 40 forints from the provincial governorship. His conduct, grades and attendance were assessed as impeccable throughout his higher education. His courses were Latin, Greek, Italian and German, geography and history, mathematics, physics. As elective courses he chose Slavic language and philosophy.

In 1875, having finished his studies, he was employed as a professor of physics and mathematics at the imperial teacher-training school of Koper, where he taught to the school's male students. Belušić taught both in German and Italian. According to a 1900 report from the Imperial and Royal Academy of Koper, Professor Belušić passed the professional exam for obtaining the title of professor in Trieste.

He then became the director of the Maritime School of Castelnuovo, near Trieste, and received the title of assistant professor in that institution. The same documentation also shows that in 1875, when he was employed at the Academy, he was a bachelor. Belušić later did marry. However, no further information about his family has been uncovered. It remains unclear where and how he died.

== Velocimeter ==
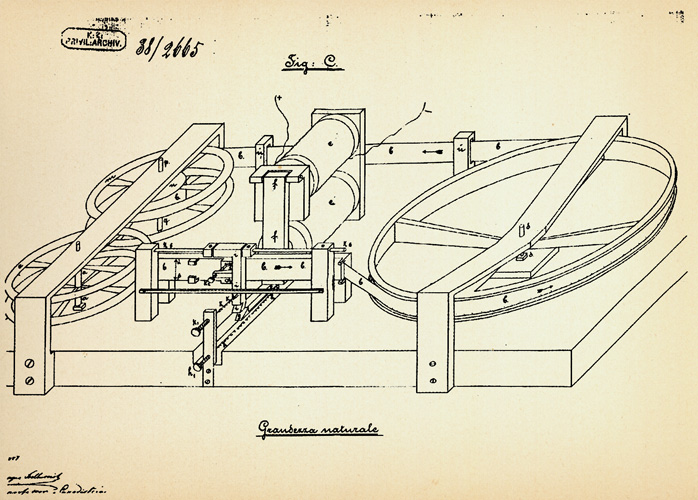
Copy of the velocimeter patent, 1888, Police Museum, Zagreb

On February 7, 1889, the Croatian newspaper Naša sloga wrote about a new invention by Professor Belušić, for which he was granted property right by the sovereign authority of the Austro-Hungarian monarchy. Foretelling a bright future, Belušić reportedly stated:

It is a small apparatus that, as a faithful servant, controls every move which the coachman makes with the horses and the carriage entrusted to him. Through electricity, this machine records whether the carriage is standing or moving and how fast it is moving; when the carriage began to move, and when it stopped. In addition, it records whether the carriage was empty or whether there was a person in it; further, it states how many people were aboard, at what time each person entered the carriage and got out of it; thence, how many minutes each person rode in the carriage.

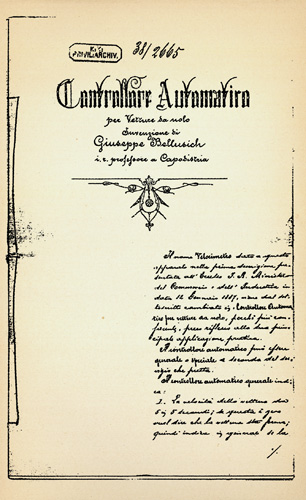
Copy of patent application for rental vehicle monitoring device, 1888, Police Museum, Zagreb

The official presentation of Belušić's invention and the first experiment took place in 1887. A second test, in late February 1889, was attended by four journalists who actively participated in the experiment on the route Trieste - Sveti Bartol. During the experiment, the carriage stopped several times; the journalists got out of the carriage and entered it again. On the way back to Trieste, they looked at what the velocimeter had registered. The journalists were delighted with the accuracy of the device, which recorded all the actions taken by the carriage on round-format paper.

The velocimeter electronically measured the speed of the vehicle, the duration of the ride, and the standing of the car; the number of carried individuals, and the passengers' time of entry and exit. Thus, Belušić's device was also a tachograph and a taximeter, a forerunner of measuring monitoring devices used today in trucks, buses and taxicabs. For this reason, Belušić is also considered the father of monitoring and surveillance devices.

Belušić applied for a patent with the State Patent Office of Vienna in 1888, under the name Controllore automatico per vetture, because his device had other functions beside measuring speed. As mentioned, his device used electrical energy, measured the speed of the vehicle, and recorded the driving time and standing of the vehicle, the number of passengers and the passengers' time of entry and exit.

The original patent is kept in the State Archives of Vienna. A copy of the patent is also housed at the Police Museum in Zagreb.

It is unclear what happened with Belušić's invention. The inventor probably had to invest more money to perfect his invention and then put it on the market, but could not finance it, so his work fell into oblivion. Documents from the State Archives of Trieste testify to the founding of a company with the aim of presenting Belušić's invention in Paris, as well as Belušić's financial trouble and problems with his business partner.

In the U.S. Patent Office's archives there is a copy of the original patent, a patent application dated December 16, 1890, and a report from the Patent Commission showing that fifty-six foreign inventors were included in the office's database in 1890. Among those registered in that year, under the patent application number 442849, there is Professor Belušić. Belušić's witnesses for his patent were Edmund J. Ussen and Otto Schiffer.

== Exposition Universelle of 1889 ==
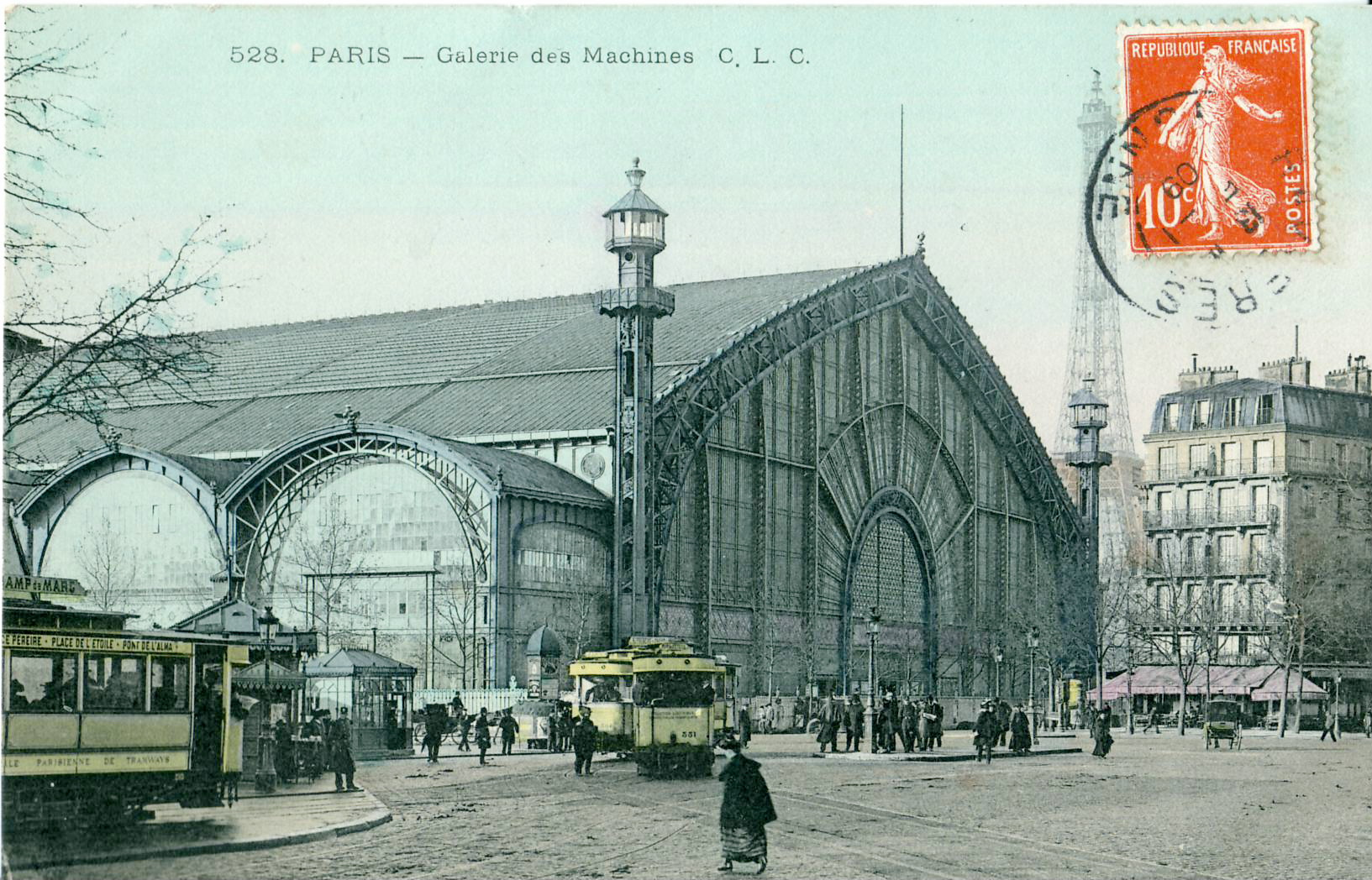
Postcard of trams stopping at the Galerie des Machines, at the edge of the Exposition

Belušić exhibited his velocimeter at the 1889 Exposition Universelle in Paris. The Exposition attracted twenty-eight million visitors and over sixty-eight thousand exhibitors, including many of the world's noted inventors and artists of the day. Although the main attractions of the exposition were the premiere of the Eiffel Tower and the opening of the colossal pavilion built for the exhibition, the Galerie des machines (by far the largest vaulted building to have yet been built), Belušić's velocimeter also drew attention. Belušić was awarded a diploma and gold medal by the French Academy of Inventors, which also named him an honorary member.

At the same time, the city council of Paris announced a public tender for monitoring the transportation service offered by city carriages. The council was determined to put an end to the constant doubts over the honesty of the coachmen. One hundred twenty-nine inventors applied for the competition, and three applicants were shortlisted, including Belušić. Field tests were scheduled for December 1889, and, in the end, Belušić's device was chosen because, in addition to measuring speed, it accurately reported the departure time of the carriage, how many times and for how long the carriage stopped.

== Later life ==
Little is known about Belušić's later life. He had become a professor of physics and mathematics at the teacher-training college of Koper, where he worked until 1900, and later the director of a maritime school in Italy. It remains unclear, however, where he spent his last years. Some speculate that the Croatian inventor sold his patent rights due to poverty. The Croatian Technical Encyclopedia reports that he died in Trieste.

== Bibliography ==
- Jamičić, Željko (January 2008). "Josip Belušić – Izumitelj tahografa" [Josip Belušić - Inventor of the Speedometer] (PDF). Mir Ugled Povjerenje (in Croatian). 3 (15). Ministry of Internal Affairs, Croatia: 48–49.
- Ageorges, Sylvain (2006), Sur les traces des Expositions Universelles (in French), Parigramme. ISBN 978-28409-6444-5
- Černjul, Valter (2001). "Istranin izumio brzinomjer, Naši ljudi i krajevi" [An Istrian invented the Speedometer; Our People and Regions]. Franina I Jurina (in Croatian): 87.
- Johan Markelj, Bericht der K.K. Lehrerbildungs- Austalt in Capodistria veröffentlicht am schlusse des schuljares 1899. / 1900., pp. 72; 89.
- Giacomo Babuder, Atti dell' I. R. ginnasio superiore di Capodistria, Anno scolastico 1865/66., Tipografia di Giuseppe Tondelli, 1866.
