= Ružići =

Ružići may refer to:

- Ružići (Grude), a village near Grude, Bosnia and Herzegovina
- Ružići, Primorje-Gorski Kotar County, a village near Matulji, Croatia
- Ružići, Poreč, a settlement near Poreč, Istria County, Croatia
- Ružići, Sveta Nedelja, a village near Sveta Nedelja, Istria County, Croatia
- Virginia Ruzici (born 1955), Romanian tennis player

== See also ==
- Ružić (singular form)
