= Šumber =

Šumber Sumber, Sumberg, Casali Sumberesi
- Village
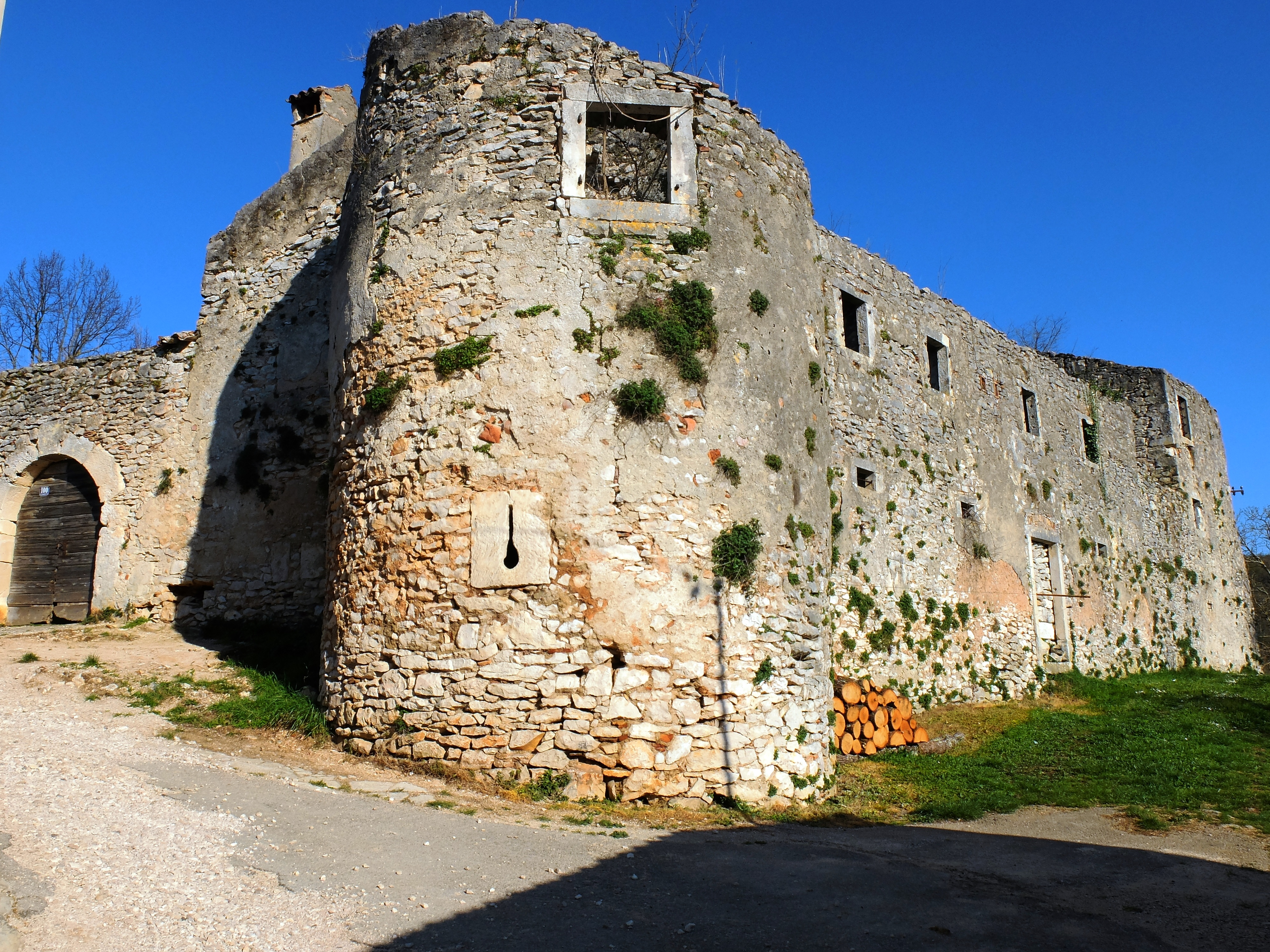
- Šumber Castle

- Location within Croatia
- Coordinates: 45°10′20″N 14°04′20″E
- Country: Croatia
- County: Istria County
- Municipality: Sveta Nedelja

Area
  - Total: 4.7 sq mi (12.2 km^{2})
- Elevation: 581 ft (177 m)

Population (2021)
  - Total: 358
  - Density: 76.0/sq mi (29.3/km^{2})
- Time zone: UTC+1 (CET)
  - Summer (DST): UTC+2 (CEST)
- Postal code: 52231 Nedešćina
- Area code: 052

Šumber (Italian: Sumber, Sumberg, Casali Sumberesi) is a village and castle ruin in the municipality of Sveta Nedelja in eastern Istria County, Croatia.

== Description ==
Šumber is located on the eastern side of the Istrian peninsula, along the local road L50123. The village is 5 kilometres (3 mi) north-west from the municipal center Nedešćina, 10 kilometres (6 mi) from Labin, and 8 kilometres (5 mi) west of Kršan.

== Castle ==
Castle Šumber is a small fortress with polygonal layout defended by two round half-towers in its south-eastern and south-western corner. The entrance is located on the western wall next to the south-western tower. Inside the enclosure are the ruins of a long and narrow palace attached to the southern wall and another small house located in the northeastern corner. Although the castle is largely preserved, at least according to Valvasor views from 1680, the tower and the residential wings were once several stories tall.

== History ==
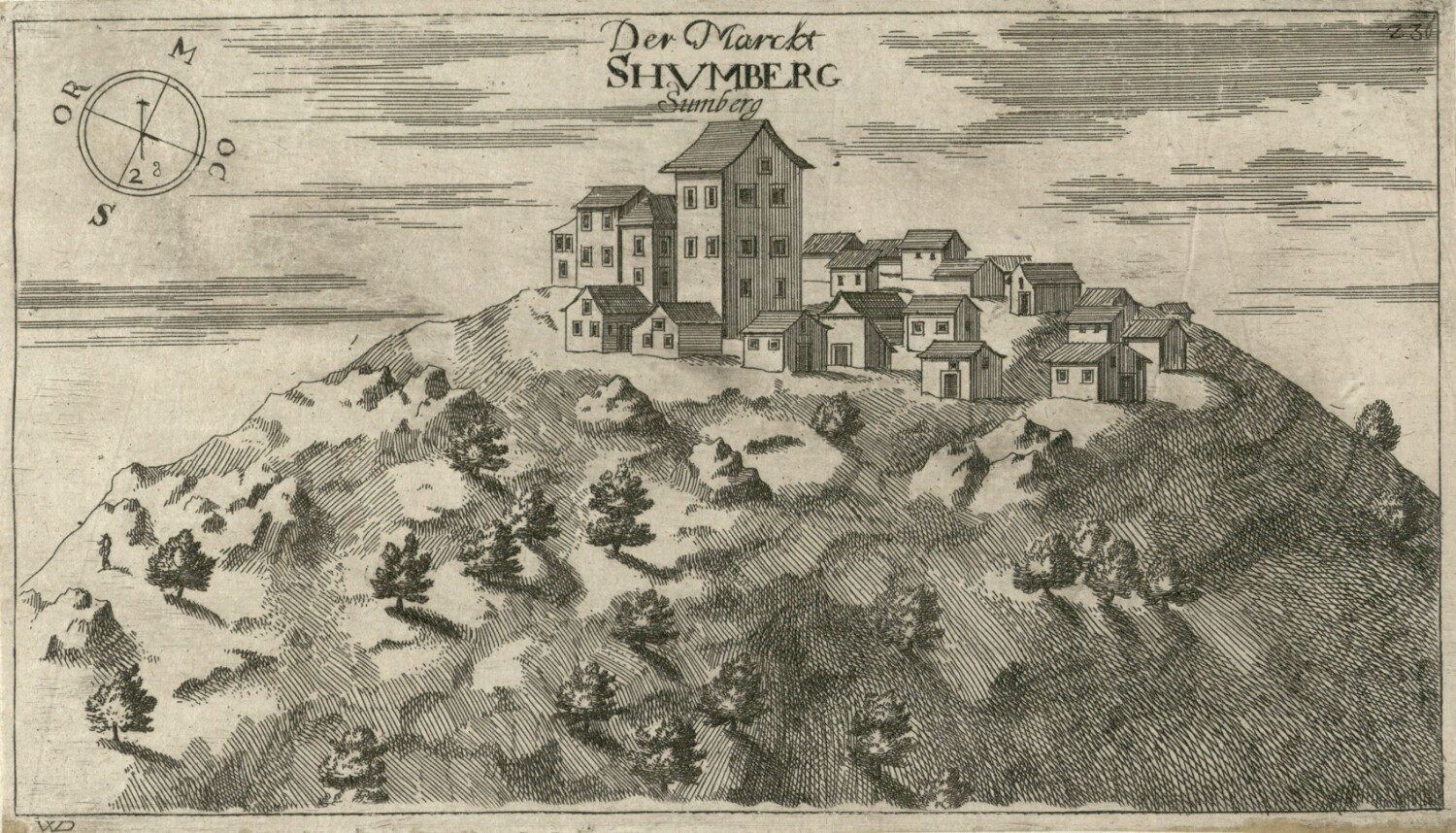
Šumber in an engraving from 1679.

Castle Šumber was built upon the site of the prehistoric hillfort in the former village Stari Grad (lit. "Old Town"). While the exact date of the castle's construction remains unknown, the site is first mentioned in documents from 872 AD and 950 AD, when the Byzantine Emperor Constantine VII Porfirogenet confirmed the presence of Slavs in these villages. In 1260, the castle and surrounding territory has passed into the possession of a vassal of the Counts of Gorizia (German: von Görz). This was the Austrian noble family Schönberg, from which the modern toponym most likely originated.

A certain Teodorich de Sumberg is also listed as a signatory of a document dated 1274, a peace treaty between Raimondo della Torre, Patriarch of Aquileia, and the Count of Gorizia Albert I. As a vassal of Count Albert III of Gorizia, Dietrich von Schönberg took part in an unsuccessful attack against the Venetian stronghold of Motovun (Italian: Montona d'Istria) in 1341. Shortly before his death, Albert III, who was childless and at his age could no longer hope to produce an heir, bequeathed his remaining holdings in Istria to Rudolf IV, Duke of Austria, of the House of Hapsburg between 1365 and 1367. With the extinction of the House of Gorizia, Šumber along with the rest of Pazin County (German: Mitterburg) would become a Habsburg possession.

By the late 14th Century, the House of Schönburg had also found itself short of male heirs. Thus with the marriage off Anna Schönberg to Ivan Gutenegg, the Lord of Kožljak (German: Waxenstein), Šumber was incorporated into Kožljak estate. With Venice's acquisition of Labin in 1420, Šumber became a strategically valuable border fortress on the frontier between the Habsburg Austrian March of Istria and the Venetian territories along the Istrian coast. In 1444, Anna sold the castle to the lord of Kršan, Juraj Kerstlein (Karscheyner). Soon after, the Venetians attacked and captured Šumber before accepting an offer from the lord of Kršan to buy both the castle and the village. The Venetians updated the fortifications, converting Šumber into a Renaissance-style castle through the addition of a corner round semi-tower. Šumber would find itself captured and recaptured numerous times between the rival powers. In 1508, yet another war broke out between the Habsburg Emperor Maximilian and the Republic of Venice and Gaspar Karscheyner again lost Kršan and Šumber, but in 1509 they were returned. While Gaspar repaired and retained Kršan, in 1515 he sold Šumber to the House of Herberstein, Lords of Lupoglav (Italian: Lupogliano).

However, the Herberstein family's rule of Šumber would prove brief, as in 1525 the Herbersteins made a deal with the Ferdinand I of Habsburg, Archduke of Austria, to exchange Šumber for Reitberg. When Ferdinand became King of Croatia in 1527, he gave Šumber Captain Petar Kružić, a famed Croatian military officer in Habsburg service who had distinguished himself in the Ottoman-Habsburg Wars. After Kružić died in 1537, Šumber was inherited by his daughter Margareta and her husband the nobleman Ivan Sinković of Senj. As Sinković died in 1616 without any male heirs, his daughters inherited Šumber.

During this period, Šumber and other Imperial outposts were exposed to frequent Venetian attacks. In 1612, Venice attacked and devastated Hapsburg Istria under the pretense that its lords were harboring the Uskoks, Croatian irregular troops in Imperial service famed for their daring cross-border raids against the Ottoman Empire. Following the conclusion of the Long Turkish War, the Uskoks turned to piracy and preyed on Venetian shipping in the Adriatic. Venice's allegation was by all accounts true, as many Uskoks did indeed find refuge on the Istrian properties of Kružić and Sinković. When the Uskoks attacked and plundered Plomin (Italian: Fianona) in 1614, Šumber was again exposed to Venetian incursions. At the beginning of Uskok War in 1616, Šumber again suffered numerous Venetian raids, which only ceased in 1617 with the end of hostilities and the Treaty of Madrid.

With peace secured and the border stabilized, Castle Šumber was converted from a defensive installation into a comfortable stately residence. In 1626, Šumber was acquired by Prince Johann Ulrich von Eggenberg and sold by his son Anton in 1634 for 42,000 florins to Baron Pompeo II Brigido of Trieste, whose lands were centered in Lupoglav (i.e. Lupoglav, Šumber, Lesičina). This family would continue to own Šumber until the end of feudalism in 1848.

== Demographics ==
According to the 2021 census, its population was 358. In 2011, the population of the village was 381.

Šumber: Population trends 1857–2021
v

population	699	682	696	730	799	872	1002	1034	928	875	772	649	604	524	432	381	358
	1857	1869	1880	1890	1900	1910	1921	1931	1948	1953	1961	1971	1981	1991	2001	2011	2021

Note:In 1857 and 1869 it is mentioned as Sumberg, in 1880 as Gorenji Kraj, in 1890 as Šumber, in 1900 and 1910 as Šumbreg, and from 1948 again as Šumber. It contains data for the village Golomičari in 1900 and 1910, for the villages Grašići and Šćedin in 1900, 1910 and 1948, and for Noskovići and Radovići in 1948. Sources: Croatian Bureau of Statistics publications

== Gallery ==
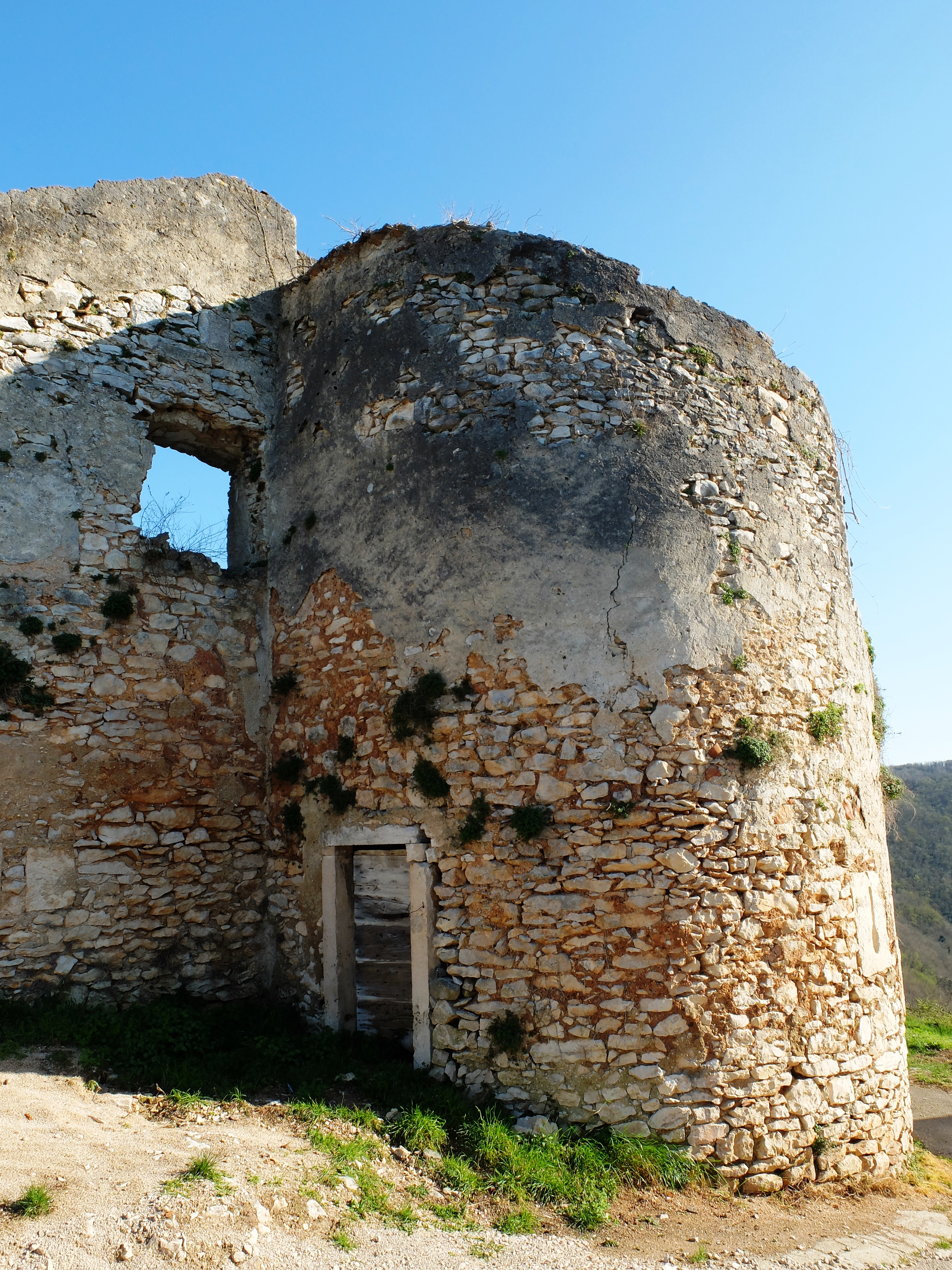
The front tower

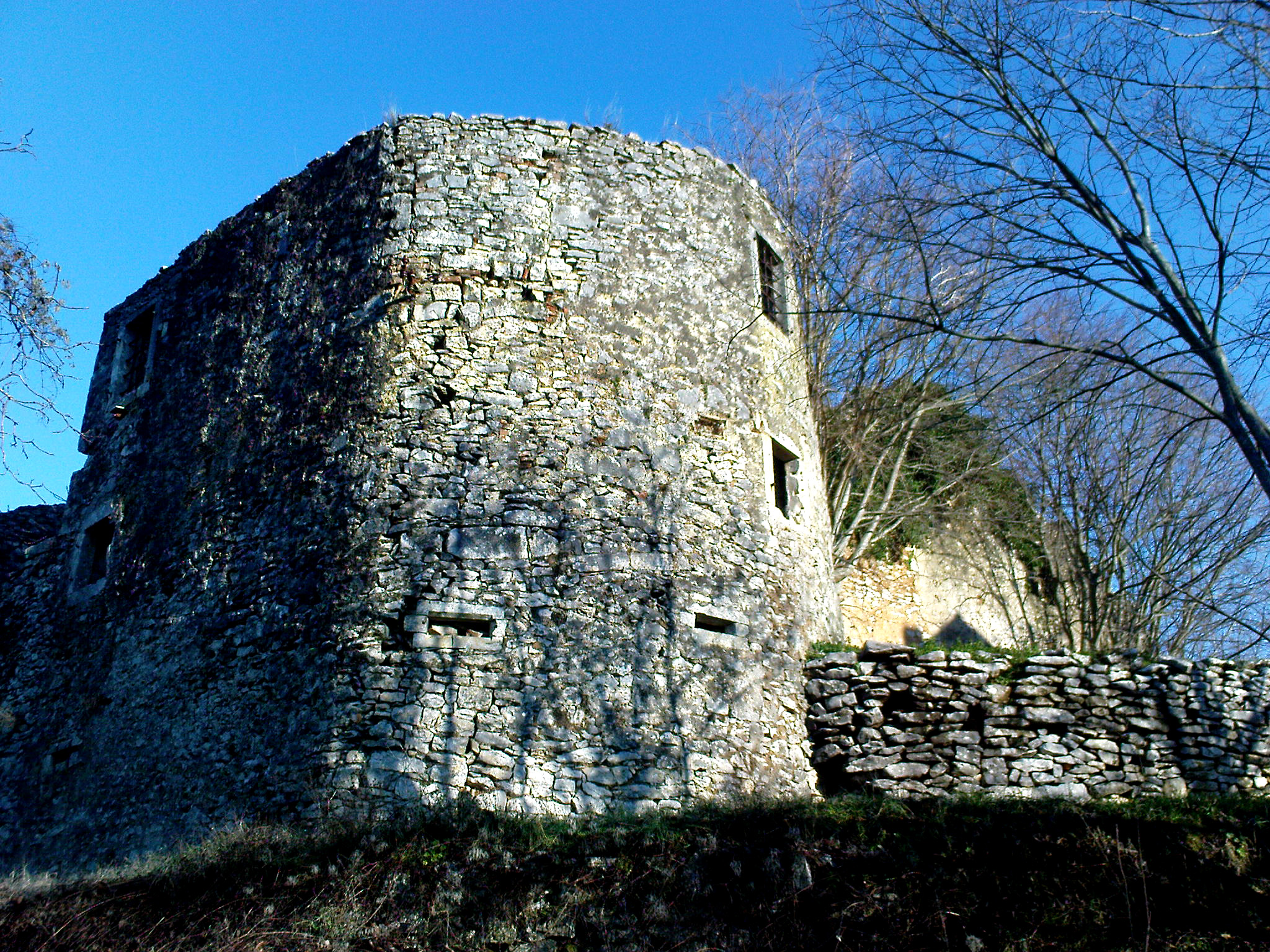
The back tower

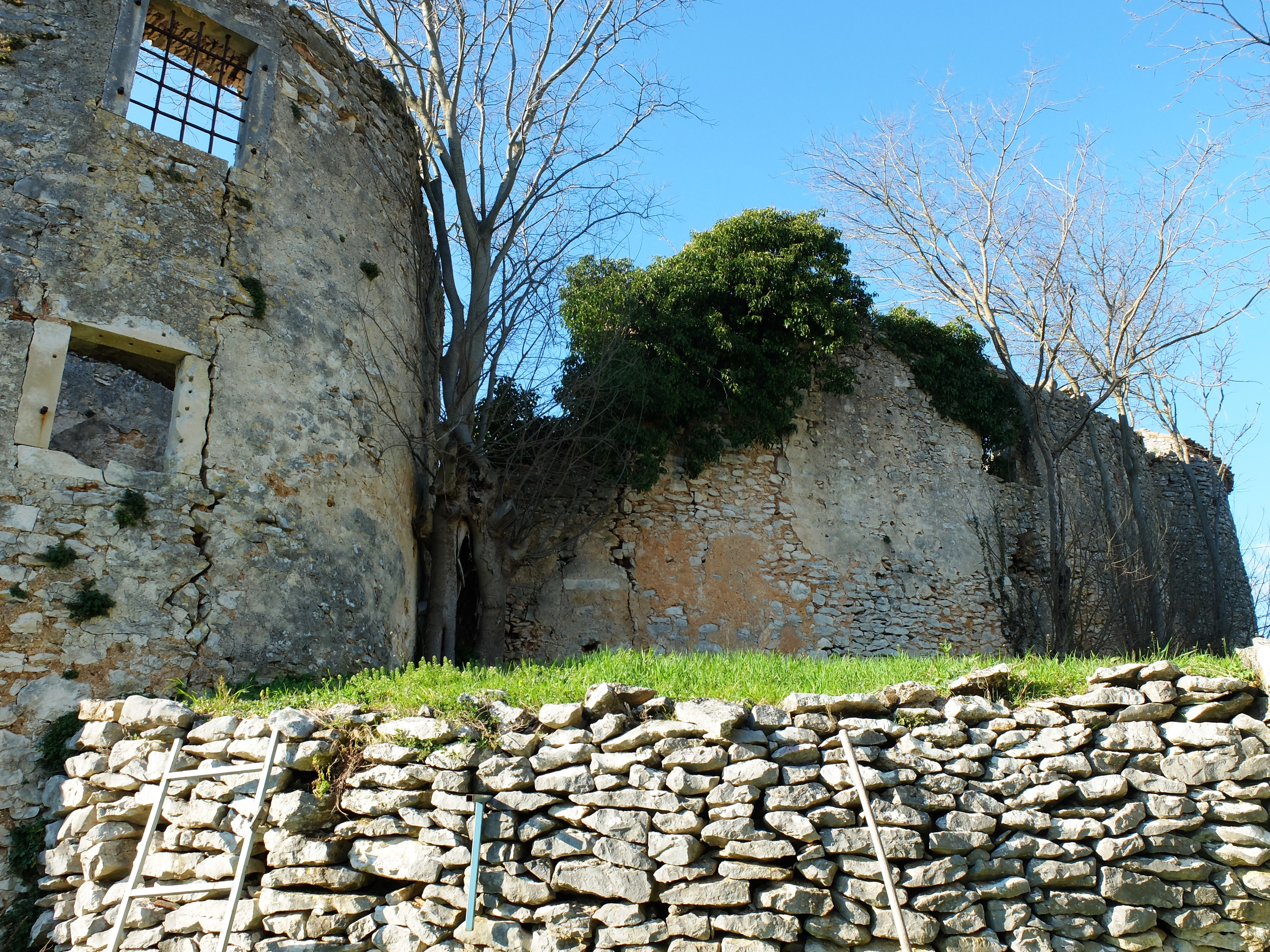
Back tower and walls

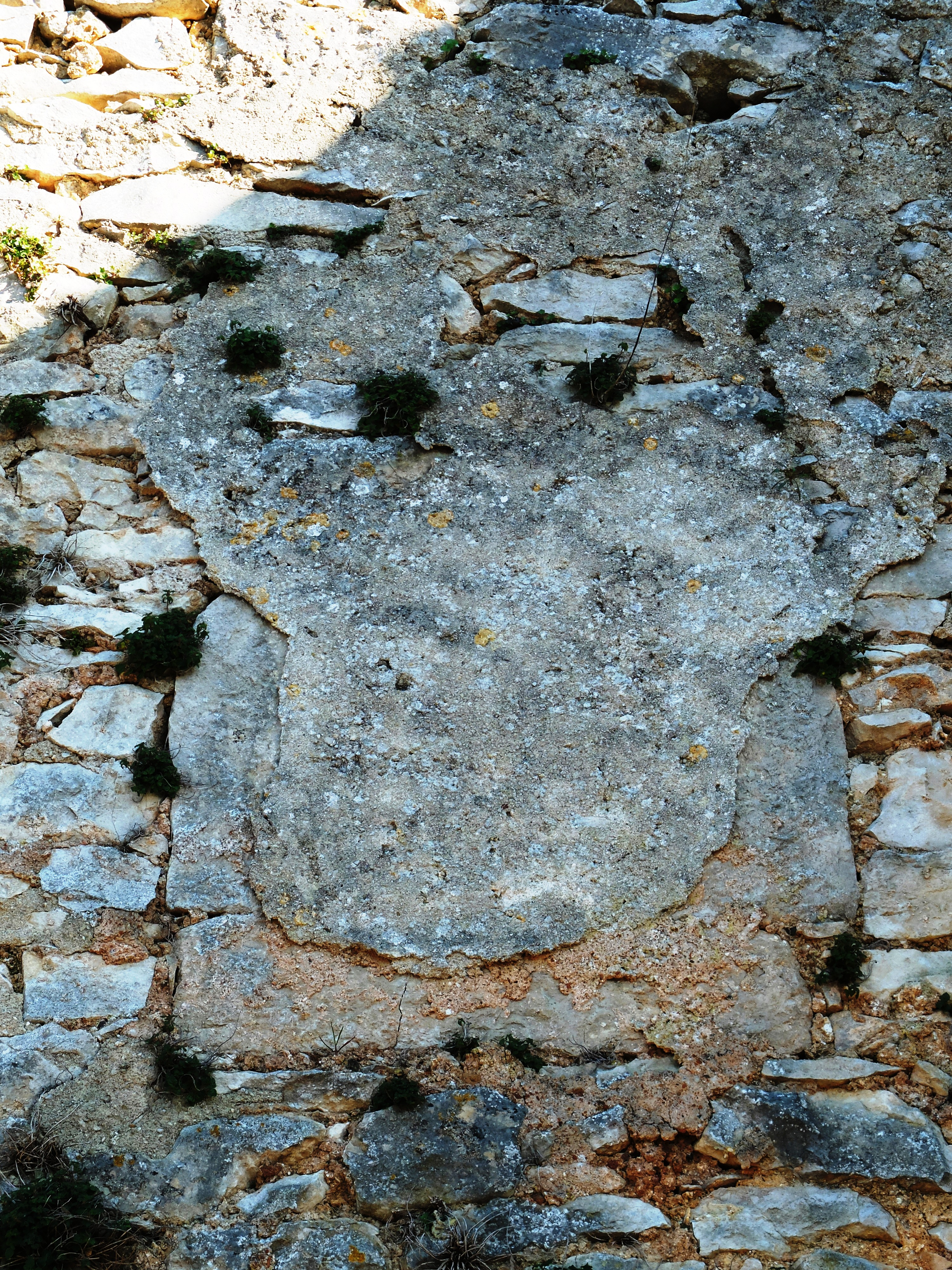
The covered coat of arms of noble family
