= Ema Derossi-Bjelajac =

Croatian politician (1926–2020)

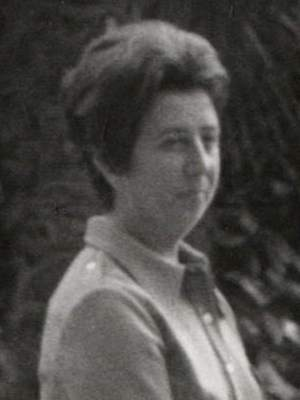

President of the Presidency of the Socialist Republic of Croatia
- In office 26 November 1985 – 9 May 1986
- Prime Minister: Ante Marković
- Preceded by: Pero Car
- Succeeded by: Ante Marković

Deputy Speaker of Parliament
- In office 1978–1982
- Speaker: Jure Bilić

Member of Parliament
- In office 1978–1982
- Speaker: Jure Bilić

Personal details
- Born: Ema Derossi; 3 May 1926 Stermàzio, Italy (now Štrmac, Croatia)
- Died: 20 June 2020 (aged 94) Zagreb, Croatia
- Party: League of Communists of Yugoslavia
- Spouse: Boško Bjelajac
- Education: University of Zagreb
- Profession: Politician

Ema Derossi-Bjelajac (3 May 1926 – 20 June 2020) was a Croatian politician who served as the President of the Presidency of the Socialist Republic of Croatia (a constituent republic of the Socialist Federal Republic of Yugoslavia) from 1985 until 1986. She was the first woman to hold a title equivalent to a head of state in modern-day Croatia.

== Biography ==
Born in Istria under Italian fascist rule, Derossi joined the Partisan movement and became a member of the League of Communist Youth (SKOJ) in 1943. After the war she worked as an party functionary in Pula from 1946 to 1948.

She served in a number of high-ranking functions within the League of Communists of Croatia and the Croatian republican government of the period: notably, she was a Member of the Central Committee of the League between 1964 and 1974, and was a Member and Deputy Speaker of the Croatian Parliament (Sabor) between 1978 and 1982. She served in the Central Committee of the League of Communists of Yugoslavia from 1964 to 1968.

On 20 June 2020, she died in Zagreb, aged 94.

== Sources ==
- DEROSSI-BJELAJAC, Ema at lzmk.hr (in Croatian)
