= Paceometer =

A paceometer is a measuring instrument that displays the time a journey over a given distance will take based on speed (for example, the number of minutes per 10 km). It serves as an alternative to the traditional speedometer and can be used to counteract time-saving bias, which is the human tendency to miscalculate the amount of time saved by increasing speed during an activity, such as driving or performing a task.

Paceometers can discourage speeding by making it clear that increasing speed saves progressively less time when one is already driving fast. Journalist Rory Sutherland has described the paceometer as something that will "change the way you drive forever". Nassim Taleb has described the paceometer as mathematically trivial, yet completely counterintuitive. Increasing speed yields diminishing returns in terms of travel time. Simply put, at low speeds every kilometer per hour counts, whereas at high speeds one saves almost nothing—yet high speeds entail greater risks and costs.

== Background ==
People tend to underestimate the time saved when increasing speed from a low level, and overestimate the time saved when increasing speed from an already high level. This effect occurs because there is a non-linear relationship between increasing speed and reducing travel time. For example, increasing speed from 30 km/h to 40 km/h results in a greater reduction in travel time than increasing it from 40 km/h to 50 km/h. Research by Eyal Peer and Eyal Gamliel has shown that people provided with information about pace make more accurate estimates regarding travel times at various speeds, time savings from different speed increases, and the speed required to complete a journey.

== See also ==
- Annual average daily traffic, measurement of how many vehicles travel on a certain road
- Bicycle performance, measurable performance metrics—such as energy efficiency and handling characteristics—that influence how effective a bicycle is for efficient transport
- Energy-efficient driving, driving techniques aimed at reducing fuel consumption
- Paceband, wristband listing expected split times for a running race to help athletes maintain a steady pace
- Preferred walking speed, often 5 km/h for humans
