= Frančići =

Frančići Villa Frani
- Village
- Location within Croatia
- Coordinates: 45.1122309°N 14.0212586°E
- Country: Croatia
- County: Istria County
- Municipality: Sveta Nedelja

Area
  - Total: 1.1 sq mi (2.8 km^{2})

Population (2021)
  - Total: 39
  - Density: 36/sq mi (14/km^{2})
- Time zone: UTC+1 (CET)
  - Summer (DST): UTC+2 (CEST)
- Postal code: 52220 Labin
- Area code: 052

Frančići (Italian: Villa Frani) is a village in the municipality of Sveta Nedelja, Istria in Croatia.

== Demographics ==
According to the 2021 census, its population was 39.
