= Municipality of Duplek =

Municipality of Slovenia

Municipality of Duplek Občina Duplek
- Municipality
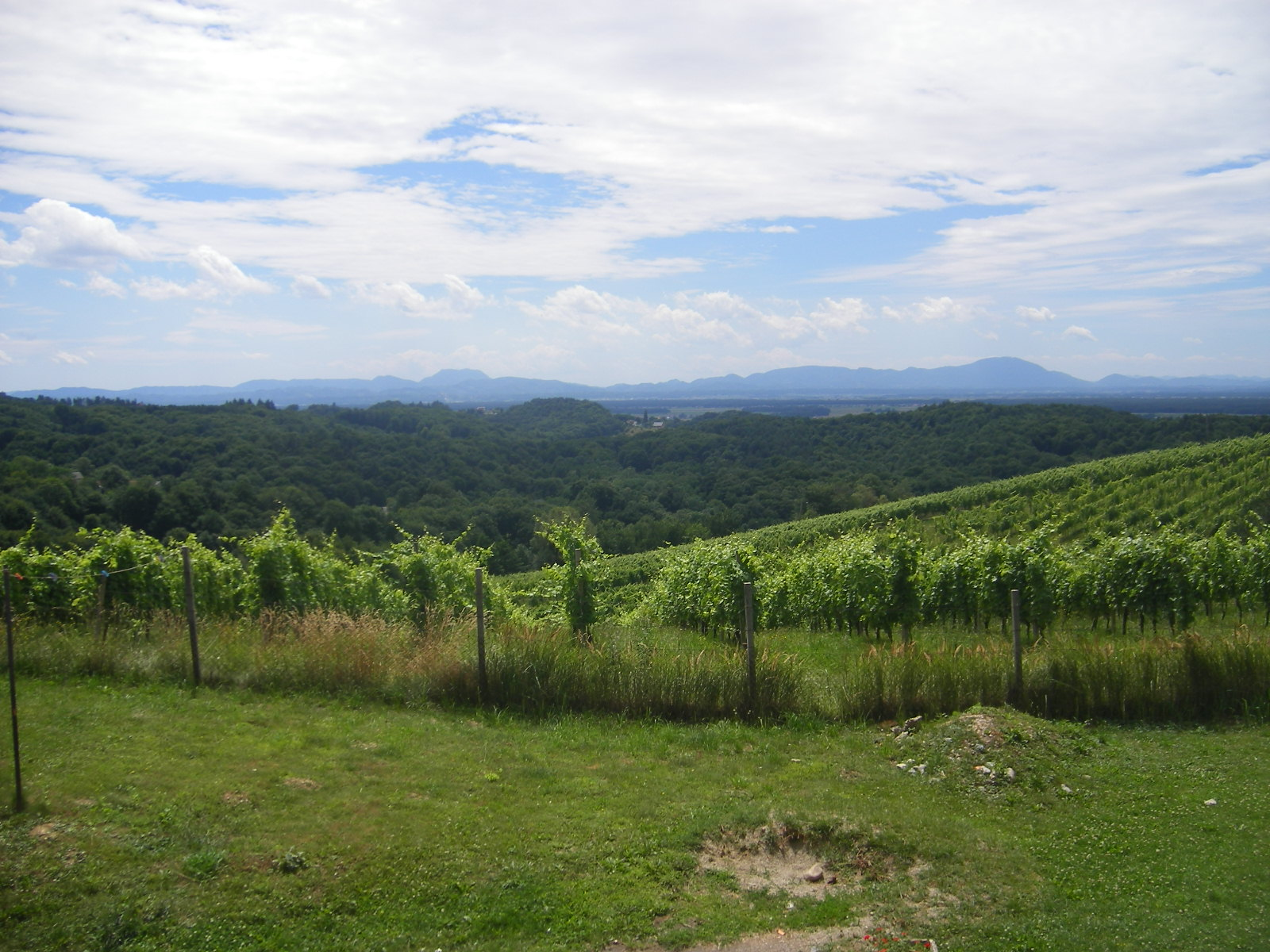

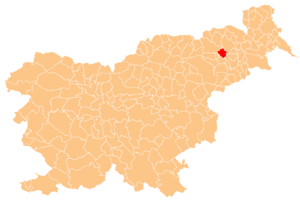
- Location of the Municipality of Duplek in Slovenia
- Coordinates: 46°31′N 15°46′E
- Country: Slovenia

Government
  - Mayor: Mitja Horvat (Independent)

Area
  - Total: 40.0 km^{2} (15.4 sq mi)

Population (2002)
  - Total: 5,938
  - Density: 148/km^{2} (384/sq mi)
- Time zone: UTC+01 (CET)
  - Summer (DST): UTC+02 (CEST)
- Website: www.duplek.si

The Municipality of Duplek (pronounced [ˈduːplɛk]; Slovene: Občina Duplek) is a small municipality in northeastern Slovenia. Its seat is Spodnji Duplek. The municipality lies on the left bank of the Drava River on the northwestern edge of the Slovene Hills (Slovene: Slovenske gorice), about 10 km southeast of Maribor. The area is part of the traditional region of Styria. It is now included in the Drava Statistical Region.

== Settlements ==
In addition to the municipal seat of Spodnji Duplek, the municipality also includes the following settlements:

- Ciglence
- Dvorjane
- Jablance
- Spodnja Korena
- Vurberk
- Zgornja Korena
- Zgornji Duplek
- Žikarce
- Zimica
