= Zgornja Korena =

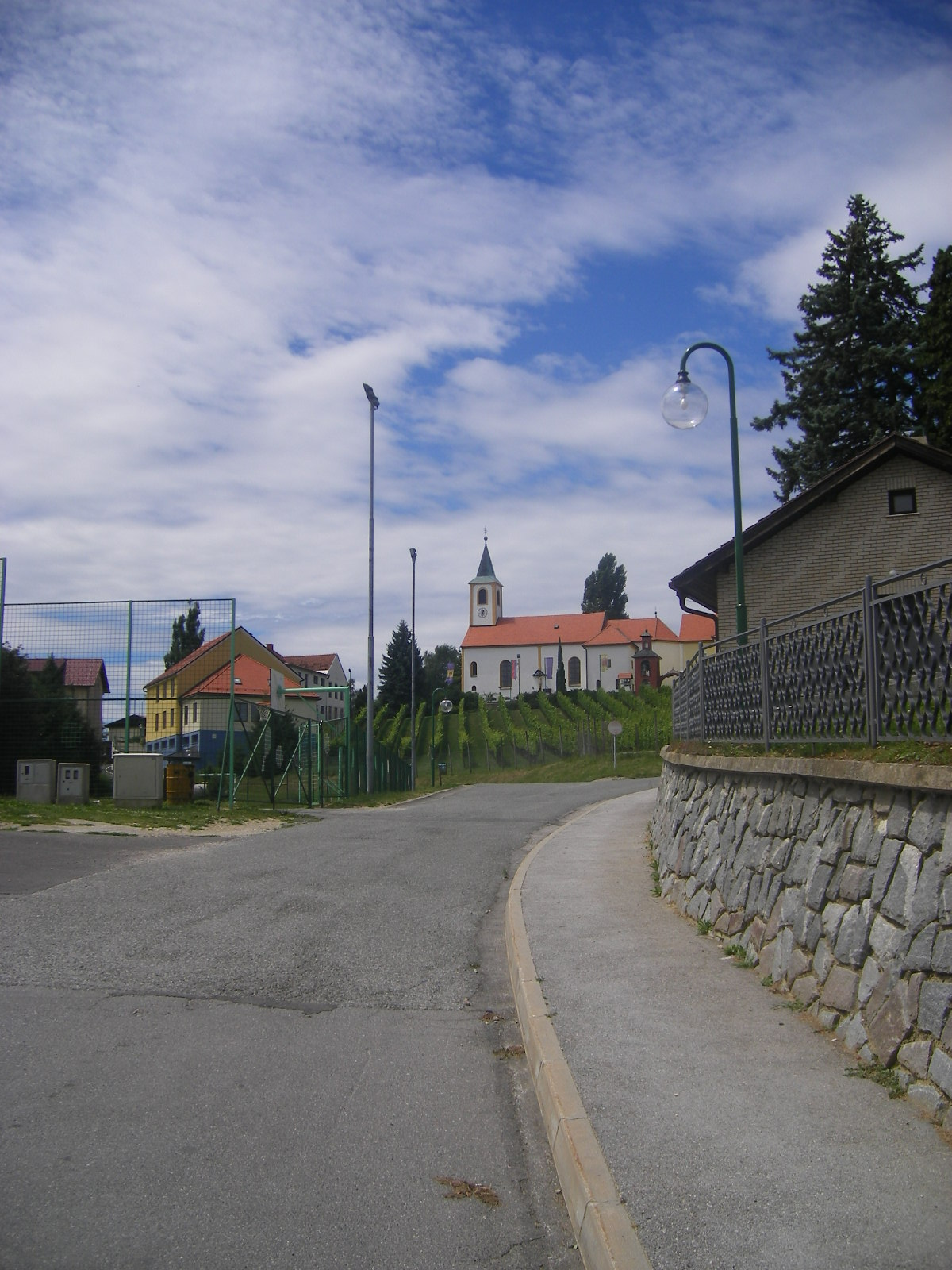

- Location in Slovenia
- Coordinates: 46°31′14.21″N 15°46′44.97″E
- Country: Slovenia
- Traditional region: Styria
- Statistical region: Drava
- Municipality: Duplek

Area
  - Total: 2.76 km^{2} (1.07 sq mi)
- Elevation: 349.8 m (1,148 ft)

Population (2020)
  - Total: 437
  - Density: 158/km^{2} (410/sq mi)

Zgornja Korena (pronounced [ˈzɡoːɾnja ˈkoːɾɛna]) is a settlement in the Municipality of Duplek in northeastern Slovenia. It lies on the southwestern edge of the Slovene Hills (Slovene: Slovenske gorice) southeast of Maribor. The area is part of the traditional region of Styria. The municipality is now included in the Drava Statistical Region.

== Church ==
The local parish church, built on a hill east of the village, is dedicated to Saint Barbara and belongs to the Roman Catholic Archdiocese of Maribor. It was built in 1787 on the site of a ruined 17th-century church.

== Notable people ==
Notable people that were born in Zgornja Korena include the following:

- Joža Glonar (1885–1946), literary historian, librarian, and linguist
