= Žikarce =

- Location in Slovenia
- Coordinates: 46°31′29.93″N 15°47′53.71″E
- Country: Slovenia
- Traditional region: Styria
- Statistical region: Drava
- Municipality: Duplek

Area
  - Total: 6.13 km^{2} (2.37 sq mi)
- Elevation: 382.2 m (1,254 ft)

Population (2020)
  - Total: 351
  - Density: 57.3/km^{2} (148/sq mi)

Žikarce (pronounced [ˈʒiːkaɾtsɛ]) is a settlement in the Slovene Hills (Slovene: Slovenske gorice) in the Municipality of Duplek in northeastern Slovenia. The area is part of the traditional region of Styria. The municipality is now included in the Drava Statistical Region.
