= Dvorjane =

Dvorjane Sveti Martin pri Vurbergu (until 1955)
- Location in Slovenia
- Coordinates: 46°29′30.07″N 15°46′18.06″E
- Country: Slovenia
- Traditional region: Styria
- Statistical region: Drava
- Municipality: Duplek

Area
  - Total: 3.39 km^{2} (1.31 sq mi)
- Elevation: 237.6 m (780 ft)

Population (2020)
  - Total: 742
  - Density: 219/km^{2} (567/sq mi)

Dvorjane (pronounced [dʋɔˈɾjaːnɛ]) is a village in the Municipality of Duplek in northeastern Slovenia. It lies on the left bank of the Drava River southeast of Maribor. The area is part of the traditional region of Styria. The municipality is now included in the Drava Statistical Region.

== Name ==
The name of the settlement was changed from Sveti Martin pri Vurbergu (literally, 'Saint Martin near Vurberg') to Dvorjane (literally, 'manor dwellers') in 1955. The name was changed on the basis of the 1948 Law on Names of Settlements and Designations of Squares, Streets, and Buildings as part of efforts by Slovenia's postwar communist government to remove religious elements from toponyms.

== Church ==
The local parish church, built on the southeastern outskirts of the village, is dedicated to Saint Martin and belongs to the Roman Catholic Archdiocese of Maribor. It is a 15th-century building, rededicated in 1535 and extended in 1782.
