= Kraj Drage =

Kraj Drage Riva Draga
- Village
- Location within Croatia
- Coordinates: 45.146347°N 14.0710916°E
- Country: Croatia
- County: Istria County
- Municipality: Sveta Nedelja

Area
  - Total: 0.54 sq mi (1.4 km^{2})

Population (2021)
  - Total: 54
  - Density: 100/sq mi (39/km^{2})
- Time zone: UTC+1 (CET)
  - Summer (DST): UTC+2 (CEST)
- Postal code: 52231 Nedešćina
- Area code: 052

Kraj Drage (Italian: Riva Draga) is a village in the municipality of Sveta Nedelja, Istria in Croatia.

== Demographics ==
According to the 2021 census, its population was 54.
