= Eržišće =

Eržišće Ersischie
- Village
- Location within Croatia
- Coordinates: 45.1543393°N 14.1228195°E
- Country: Croatia
- County: Istria County
- Municipality: Sveta Nedelja

Area
  - Total: 1.5 sq mi (4.0 km^{2})

Population (2021)
  - Total: 47
  - Density: 30/sq mi (12/km^{2})
- Time zone: UTC+1 (CET)
  - Summer (DST): UTC+2 (CEST)
- Postal code: 52231 Nedešćina
- Area code: 052

Eržišće (Italian: Ersischie) is a village in the municipality of Sveta Nedelja, Istria in Croatia.

== Demographics ==
According to the 2021 census, its population was 47.
