= Ružić =

Ružić may refer to:

== Places ==
- Ružić, Croatia, a village and a municipality in the Šibenik-Knin County, Croatia
- Ružić (Vladičin Han), a village in southern Serbia

== People ==
- Jovan Ružić (1898–1973), Serbian footballer
- Branko Ružić (1919–1997), Croatian painter, sculptor and professor
- Milan Ružić (1955–2014), Croatian football player
- Branko Ružić (born 1975), Serbian politician
- Tomislav Ružić (born 1979), Croatian basketball player
- Dushan Ruzic (born 1982), Australian baseball pitcher
- Antonia Ružić (born 2003), Croatian tennis player

== See also ==
- Ružići (disambiguation) (plural form)
