= Zimica =

- Location in Slovenia
- Coordinates: 46°32′7.59″N 15°45′17.97″E
- Country: Slovenia
- Traditional region: Styria
- Statistical region: Drava
- Municipality: Duplek

Area
  - Total: 4.07 km^{2} (1.57 sq mi)
- Elevation: 317.1 m (1,040 ft)

Population (2020)
  - Total: 576
  - Density: 142/km^{2} (367/sq mi)

Zimica (pronounced [ziˈmiːtsa]) is a village in the Municipality of Duplek in northeastern Slovenia. It lies on the southwestern edge of the Slovene Hills (Slovene: Slovenske gorice) east of Maribor. The area is part of the traditional region of Styria. The municipality is now included in the Drava Statistical Region.

A small Baroque style chapel-shrine in the village centre was built in 1826.
