= Jurazini =

Jurazini Iurassini
- Village
- Location within Croatia
- Coordinates: 45.1515501°N 14.1043799°E
- Country: Croatia
- County: Istria County
- Municipality: Sveta Nedelja

Area
  - Total: 0.15 sq mi (0.4 km^{2})

Population (2021)
  - Total: 91
  - Density: 590/sq mi (230/km^{2})
- Time zone: UTC+1 (CET)
  - Summer (DST): UTC+2 (CEST)
- Postal code: 52231 Nedešćina
- Area code: 052

Jurazini (Italian: Iurassini) Is a village in the municipality of Sveta Nedelja, Istria in Croatia.

== Demographics ==
According to the 2021 census, its population was 91.
