= Markoci =

Markoci Marcozzi
- Village
- Location within Croatia
- Coordinates: 45.1208764°N 14.0566156°E
- Country: Croatia
- County: Istria County
- Municipality: Sveta Nedelja

Area
  - Total: 1.2 sq mi (3.0 km^{2})

Population (2021)
  - Total: 69
  - Density: 60/sq mi (23/km^{2})
- Time zone: UTC+1 (CET)
  - Summer (DST): UTC+2 (CEST)
- Postal code: 52220 Labin
- Area code: 052

Markoci (Italian: Marcozzi) is a village in the municipality of Sveta Nedelja, Istria in Croatia.

== Demographics ==
According to the 2021 census, its population was 69.
