= Marići, Sveta Nedelja =

Marići
- Village
- Location within Croatia
- Coordinates: 45.107573°N 14.0350317°E
- Country: Croatia
- County: Istria County
- Municipality: Sveta Nedelja

Area
  - Total: 0.27 sq mi (0.7 km^{2})

Population (2021)
  - Total: 75
  - Density: 280/sq mi (110/km^{2})
- Time zone: UTC+1 (CET)
  - Summer (DST): UTC+2 (CEST)
- Postal code: 52220 Labin
- Area code: 052

Marići is a village in the municipality of Sveta Nedelja, Istria in Croatia.

== Demographics ==
According to the 2021 census, its population was 75.
