= Mali Golji =

Mali Golji Goglia Piccola
- Village
- Location within Croatia
- Coordinates: 45.1093277°N 14.0455531°E
- Country: Croatia
- County: Istria County
- Municipality: Sveta Nedelja

Area
  - Total: 0.77 sq mi (2.0 km^{2})

Population (2021)
  - Total: 102
  - Density: 130/sq mi (51/km^{2})
- Time zone: UTC+1 (CET)
  - Summer (DST): UTC+2 (CEST)
- Postal code: 52220 Labin
- Area code: 052

Mali Golji (Italian: Goglia Piccola) is a village in the municipality of Sveta Nedelja, Istria in Croatia.

== Demographics ==
According to the 2021 census, its population was 102.
