= Mali Turini =

Mali Turini Turini Piccola
- Village
- Location within Croatia
- Coordinates: 45.0907496°N 14.022876°E
- Country: Croatia
- County: Istria County
- Municipality: Sveta Nedelja

Area
  - Total: 0.58 sq mi (1.5 km^{2})

Population (2021)
  - Total: 37
  - Density: 64/sq mi (25/km^{2})
- Time zone: UTC+1 (CET)
  - Summer (DST): UTC+2 (CEST)
- Postal code: 52220 Labin
- Area code: 052

Mali Turini (Italian: Turini Piccola) is a village in the municipality of Sveta Nedelja, Istria in Croatia.

== Demographics ==
According to the 2021 census, its population was 37.
