= Vrećari =

Vrećari Vrezzari
- Village
- Location within Croatia
- Coordinates: 45.1234996°N 14.1035735°E
- Country: Croatia
- County: Istria County
- Municipality: Sveta Nedelja

Area
  - Total: 0.66 sq mi (1.7 km^{2})

Population (2021)
  - Total: 199
  - Density: 300/sq mi (120/km^{2})
- Time zone: UTC+1 (CET)
  - Summer (DST): UTC+2 (CEST)
- Postal code: 52231 Nedešćina
- Area code: 052

Vrećari (Italian: Vrezzari) is a village in the municipality of Sveta Nedelja, Istria in Croatia.

== Demographics ==
According to the 2021 census, its population was 199.
