= Ciglence =

- Location in Slovenia
- Coordinates: 46°29′49″N 15°46′48.44″E
- Country: Slovenia
- Traditional region: Styria
- Statistical region: Drava
- Municipality: Duplek

Area
  - Total: 2.96 km^{2} (1.14 sq mi)
- Elevation: 334.9 m (1,099 ft)

Population (2020)
  - Total: 319
  - Density: 108/km^{2} (279/sq mi)

Ciglence (pronounced [tsiˈɡleːntsɛ], German: Ziglenzen) is a settlement in the Municipality of Duplek in northeastern Slovenia. It lies on the southwestern edge of the Slovene Hills (Slovene: Slovenske gorice), southeast of Maribor. The area is part of the traditional region of Styria. The municipality is now included in the Drava Statistical Region.

The village chapel-shrine with a small belfry dates to the early 20th century. There are two other small roadside chapel-shrines in the settlement. One dates to the first half of the 19th century and the second to the late 19th century.
