= Spodnja Korena =

- Location in Slovenia
- Coordinates: 46°30′49.75″N 15°45′34.25″E
- Country: Slovenia
- Traditional region: Styria
- Statistical region: Drava
- Municipality: Duplek

Area
  - Total: 3.04 km^{2} (1.17 sq mi)
- Elevation: 274.6 m (901 ft)

Population (2020)
  - Total: 385
  - Density: 127/km^{2} (328/sq mi)

Spodnja Korena (pronounced [ˈspoːdnja ˈkoːɾɛna]) is a settlement in the Municipality of Duplek in northeastern Slovenia. It lies on the southwestern edge of the Slovene Hills (Slovene: Slovenske gorice) southeast of Maribor. The area is part of the traditional region of Styria. The municipality is now included in the Drava Statistical Region.

A site of a Roman-era limestone quarry has been identified near the settlement.
