= Spodnji Duplek =

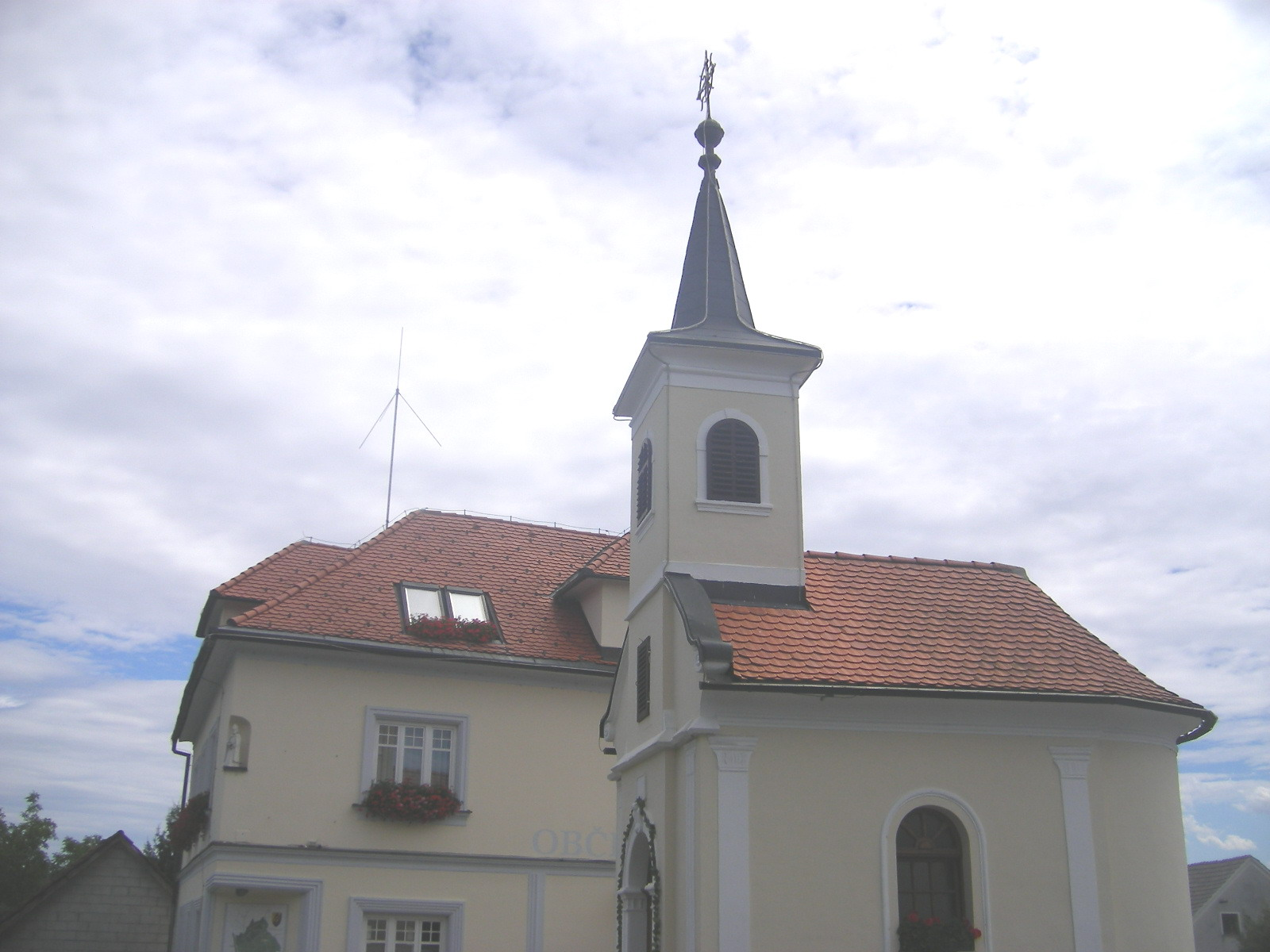

- Flag Coat of arms

- Location in Slovenia
- Coordinates: 46°30′18.99″N 15°44′48.27″E
- Country: Slovenia
- Traditional region: Styria
- Statistical region: Drava
- Municipality: Duplek

Area
  - Total: 3.62 km^{2} (1.40 sq mi)
- Elevation: 238.4 m (782 ft)

Population (2020)
  - Total: 1,689
  - Density: 467/km^{2} (1,210/sq mi)

Spodnji Duplek (pronounced [ˈspoːdnji ˈduːplɛk]) is a settlement and the administrative centre of the Municipality of Duplek in northeastern Slovenia. It lies on the left bank of the Drava River southeast of Maribor. The area is part of the traditional region of Styria. The municipality is now included in the Drava Statistical Region.

A Neo-Baroque chapel-shrine with a belfry at the crossroads in the centre of the settlement dates to 1860.
