= Jablance, Duplek =

Jablance
- Location in Slovenia
- Coordinates: 46°32′17.67″N 15°46′1.29″E
- Country: Slovenia
- Traditional region: Styria
- Statistical region: Drava
- Municipality: Duplek

Area
  - Total: 2.5 km^{2} (0.97 sq mi)
- Elevation: 260.4 m (854 ft)

Population (2020)
  - Total: 210
  - Density: 84/km^{2} (220/sq mi)

Jablance (pronounced [ˈjaːblantsɛ]) is a settlement in the Slovene Hills (Slovene: Slovenske gorice) east of Maribor in northeastern Slovenia. It lies in the Municipality of Duplek. The area is part of the traditional region of Styria. The municipality is now included in the Drava Statistical Region.

A number of Roman-era burial mounds have been identified near the settlement.
