= Santalezi =

Santalezi Santalesi
- Village
- Location within Croatia
- Coordinates: 45.1361247°N 14.0702669°E
- Country: Croatia
- County: Istria County
- Municipality: Sveta Nedelja

Area
  - Total: 1.8 sq mi (4.6 km^{2})

Population (2021)
  - Total: 168
  - Density: 95/sq mi (37/km^{2})
- Time zone: UTC+1 (CET)
  - Summer (DST): UTC+2 (CEST)
- Postal code: 52231 Nedešćina
- Area code: 052

Santalezi (Italian: Santalesi) is a village in the municipality of Sveta Nedelja, Istria in Croatia.

== Demographics ==
According to the 2021 census, its population was 168.
