= Paradiž, Sveta Nedelja =

Paradiž
- Village
- Location within Croatia
- Coordinates: 45.1180147°N 14.0310734°E
- Country: Croatia
- County: Istria County
- Municipality: Sveta Nedelja

Area
  - Total: 0.69 sq mi (1.8 km^{2})

Population (2021)
  - Total: 70
  - Density: 100/sq mi (39/km^{2})
- Time zone: UTC+1 (CET)
  - Summer (DST): UTC+2 (CEST)
- Postal code: 52342 Svetvinčenat
- Area code: 052

Paradiž is a village in the municipality of Sveta Nedelja, Istria in Croatia.

== Demographics ==
According to the 2021 census, its population was 70.
