= Zgornji Duplek =

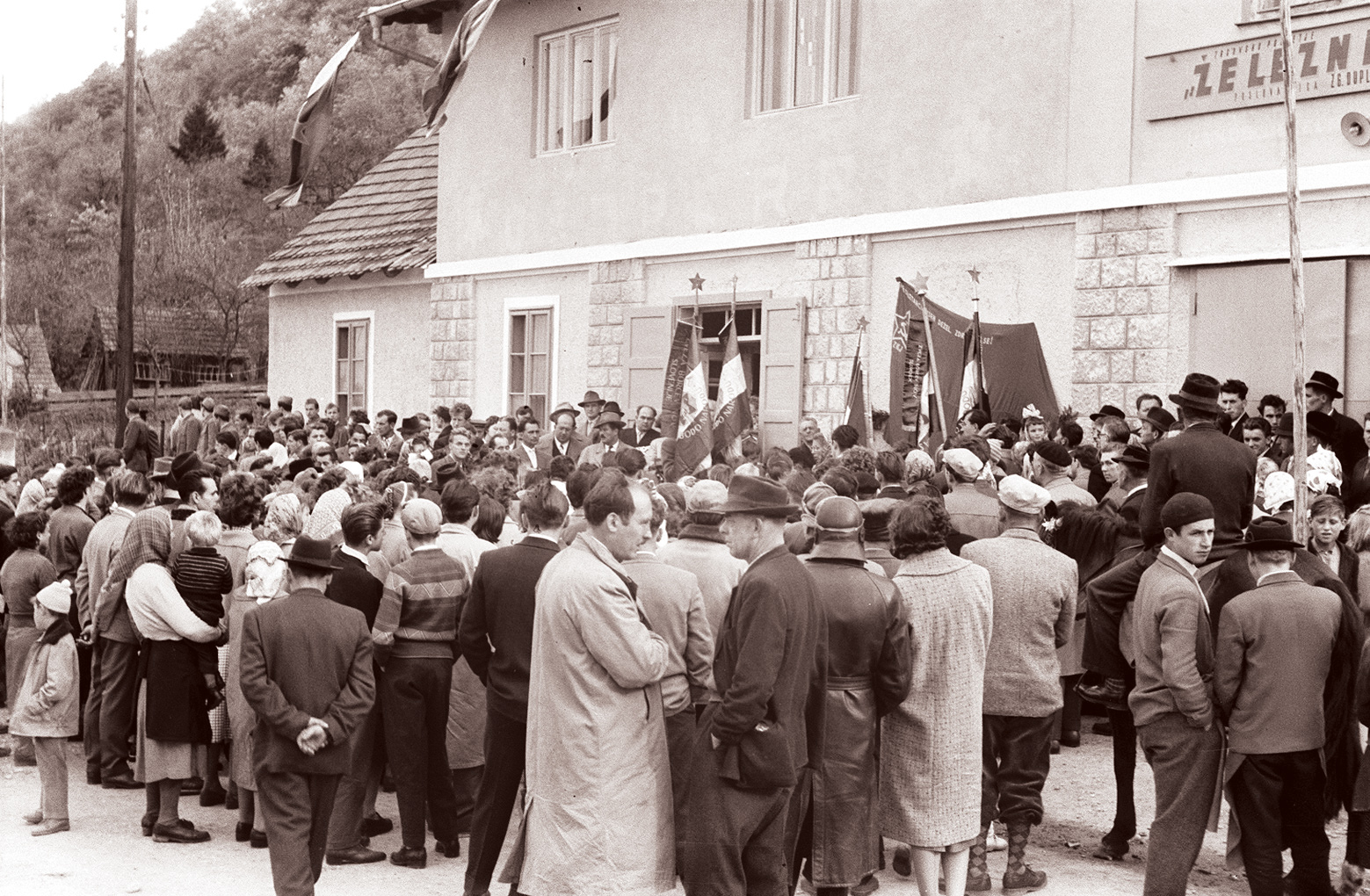
- Plaque unveiling ceremony in Zgornji Duplek in 1960

- Location in Slovenia
- Coordinates: 46°30′33.21″N 15°43′57.85″E
- Country: Slovenia
- Traditional region: Styria
- Statistical region: Drava
- Municipality: Duplek

Area
  - Total: 6.54 km^{2} (2.53 sq mi)
- Elevation: 248.9 m (817 ft)

Population (2020)
  - Total: 1,824
  - Density: 279/km^{2} (722/sq mi)

Zgornji Duplek (pronounced [ˈzɡoːɾnji ˈduːplɛk]) is a settlement in the Municipality of Duplek in northeastern Slovenia. It lies on the left bank of the Drava River southeast of Maribor. The area is part of the traditional region of Styria. The municipality is now included in the Drava Statistical Region.

An 8th- to 9th-century Slavic burial ground with signs of pre-Christian burial rituals has been identified near the settlement.
