= Štrmac =

Štrmac Stermazio
- Village
- Location within Croatia
- Country: Croatia
- County: Istria County
- Municipality: Sveta Nedelja

Area
  - Total: 1.6 sq mi (4.2 km^{2})

Population (2021)
  - Total: 396
  - Density: 240/sq mi (94/km^{2})
- Time zone: UTC+1 (CET)
  - Summer (DST): UTC+2 (CEST)
- Postal code: 52220 Labin
- Area code: 052

Štrmac (Italian: Stermazio) is a village in Croatia. It is connected by the D66 highway.

== Demographics ==
According to the 2021 census, its population was 396.
