= Nedešćina =

Nedešćina Santa Domenica d'Albona
- Village
- Location within Croatia
- Coordinates: 45°08′24″N 14°06′50″E
- Country: Croatia
- County: Istria County
- Municipality: Sveta Nedelja

Area
  - Total: 1.4 sq mi (3.5 km^{2})

Population (2021)
  - Total: 537
  - Density: 400/sq mi (150/km^{2})
- Time zone: UTC+1 (CET)
  - Summer (DST): UTC+2 (CEST)
- Postal code: 52231 Nedešćina
- Area code: 052

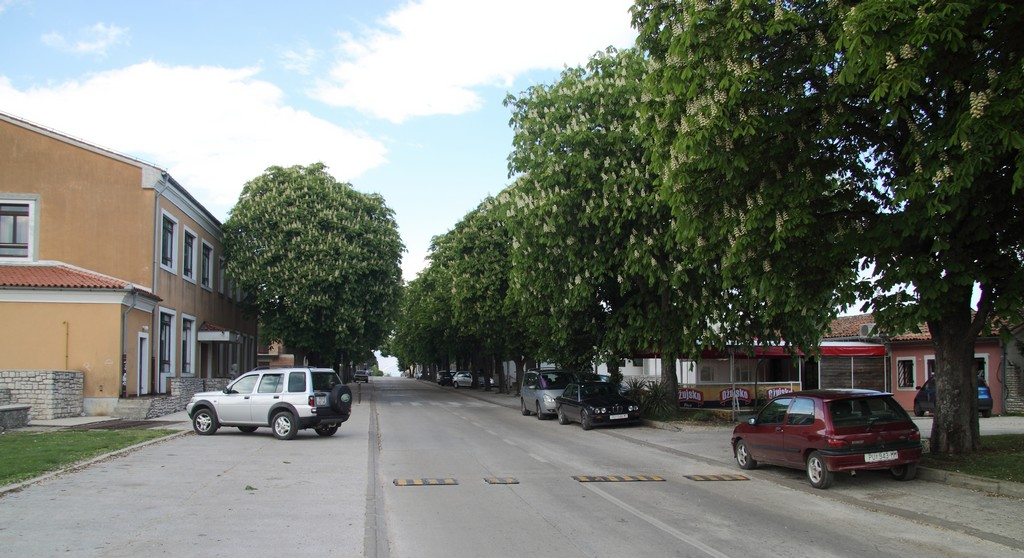
Nedešćina as seen from its main street

Nedešćina (Italian: Santa Domenica d'Albona) is a village in the Istria County in Croatia. It is part of Sveta Nedelja municipality situated on the Labinština peninsula in Istria.

== Demographics ==
According to the 2021 census, its population was 537. It was 604 in 2011.

== History ==
Nedešćina and its surroundings were inhabited as early as the Bronze Age, as evidenced by the prehistoric fortifications of the Illyrian-Celtic tribes. By the end of the 13th century there was a Benedictine Abbey of the Holy Trinity in the place. From Istrian Demarcation it is learned that the corner of the church of St. Trojica was located on the border of three communes: Šumber, Labin, and Plomin. Nedešćina has been the center of the parish since 1632. Today's Church of the Holy Trinity was built in 1897 on the site of an older one. At the beginning of the 20th century there are two elementary schools in the village, one being in Croatian and one in Italian. The settlement is also known for its fairs, which were held on June 13, the day of St. Anton, and on October 16, when the famous livestock fair was held. The latter is still celebrated as the folk festival "Šesnajst otobra".
