= Vurberk =

Vurberk Vumpah (until 1982)
- Location in Slovenia
- Coordinates: 46°29′11.23″N 15°47′18.38″E
- Country: Slovenia
- Traditional region: Styria
- Statistical region: Drava
- Municipality: Duplek

Area
  - Total: 4.98 km^{2} (1.92 sq mi)
- Elevation: 266.9 m (876 ft)

Population (2020)
  - Total: 463
  - Density: 93.0/km^{2} (241/sq mi)

Vurberk (pronounced [ˈʋuːɾbɛɾk]) is a settlement in the Municipality of Duplek in northeastern Slovenia. It lies on the left bank of the Drava River on the southwestern edge of the Slovene Hills (Slovene: Slovenske gorice), southeast of Maribor. The area is part of the traditional region of Styria. The municipality is now included in the Drava Statistical Region.

== Name ==
The name of the settlement was changed from Vumpah to Vurberk in 1982. The Slovene name Vumpah is derived from German Wurmbach and was first attested as such in 1496. The Slovene name Vurberk originally referred to the castle above the village and is derived from German Wurmberg. Vurberk Castle, destroyed in 1945, was first mentioned in 1244 as Wuermwerg.

== Church ==
The local parish church, built on a hill east of the village, next to a small castle, is dedicated to the Assumption of Mary and belongs to the Roman Catholic Archdiocese of Maribor. It is a Baroque building from 1776.
