= Županići =

Županići Zupanici
- Village
- Location within Croatia
- Country: Croatia
- County: Istria County
- Municipality: Sveta Nedelja

Area
  - Total: 0.85 sq mi (2.2 km^{2})

Population (2021)
  - Total: 136
  - Density: 160/sq mi (62/km^{2})
- Time zone: UTC+1 (CET)
  - Summer (DST): UTC+2 (CEST)
- Postal code: 52231 Nedešćina
- Area code: 052

Županići (Italian: Zupanici) is a village in Croatia. It is part of the municipality of Sveta Nedelja in Istria County.

== Demographics ==
According to the 2021 census, its population was 136.
