= Ružići, Sveta Nedelja =

Ružići
- Village
- Location within Croatia
- Coordinates: 45.144868°N 14.0500081°E
- Country: Croatia
- County: Istria County
- Municipality: Sveta Nedelja

Area
  - Total: 1.6 sq mi (4.2 km^{2})

Population (2021)
  - Total: 110
  - Density: 68/sq mi (26/km^{2})
- Time zone: UTC+1 (CET)
  - Summer (DST): UTC+2 (CEST)
- Postal code: 52231 Nedešćina
- Area code: 052

Ružići is a village in the municipality of Sveta Nedelja, Istria in Croatia.

== Demographics ==
According to the 2021 census, its population was 110 within 41 private households.

== History ==
A prehistoric fortress was located on the territory of this settlement.
