= Speed limits in Norway =

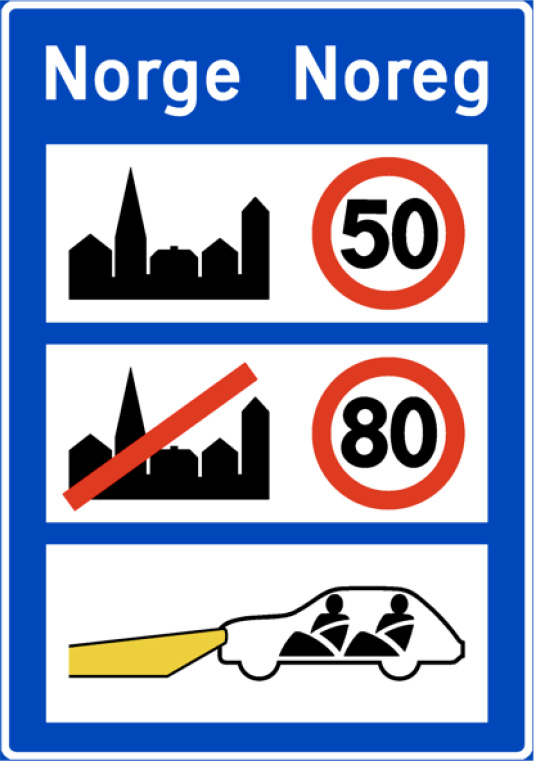
Informational sign at the Norwegian border depicting general speeds limits and, mandatory DRLs and seat belts.

Norway has two general speed limits:

- 50 km/h in densely populated areas.
- 80 km/h in sparsely populated areas.

General speed limits in Norway are not signposted, except in certain circumstances, and shall be indicated by the road's surroundings. Other speed limits are referred to as special speeds limits. These are signposted. The general speed limits are signposted when the general speed limit is lower than the speed limit one is coming from.

Special speed limits range from 10 km/h to 110 km/h. The most common being 30 km/h in residential areas, 50 km/h and 60 km/h in urban areas, and 70 km/h and above on rural roads/motorways. 80 km/h is by far the most common speed limit. 90 km/h is found on good 2-lane roads with few intersections and sparse traffic, and 100 km/h and 110 km/h on motorways.

Some vehicles and driving licenses have additional restrictions. These include:

- Vehicles weighing over 3500 kg or vehicles pulling trailers may not drive faster than 80 km/h.
  - Except buses, which may drive up to 100 km/h.
  - Vehicles pulling "Tempo 100" approved trailers may drive up to 100 km/h.
- Driving licence class T gives the right to drive tractors with a top speed of up to 40 km/h.
- Driving licence class AM (moped licence) gives the right to drive moped with a top speed of up to 45 km/h.

== History ==
Speed limits on motorways have been raised gradually since their introduction in the 1960s. At first, motorways had no special speed limit, hence the general speed limit of 80 km/h applied. 90 km/h was introduced in 1965. The speed limit was raised again on 6 July 2001 to 100 km/h and on 13 June 2014 to 110 km/h. As of 2019, the government is considering raising the upper speed limit to 120 km/h. Nye Veier AS, the state-owned company responsible for construction and operation of certain new motorways, want a speed limit as high as feasible, possibly 130 km/h. Since March 2022, the speed limit for trailers without brakes and weighing over 300 kg in total has been raised from 60 km/h to 80 km/h. Some trailers may also be approved to be pulled up to 100 km/h.

== Traffic signs ==
=== Design ===
Norway has signed the Vienna Convention, therefore the speed limit signs are shown as black letters on a white field inside a red circle. The font used is Trafikkalfabetet.

A selection of different speed limit signs.

Speed limit of 50 km/h. The standard speed limit for densely populated areas is 50. This is always signposted with this sign, in opposite to many European countries where a sign with the name of the densely populated area itself indicates 50.

Speed limit of 70 km/h

Speed limit of 80 km/h. Used where it is not completely obvious that the general speed limit applies.

Speed limit of 110 km/h

End of speed limit of 50 km/h. The general speed limit of 80 km/h now applies.

End of speed limit of 70 km/h.

Speed limit zone of 30 km/h

End of speed limit zone
