= Speed limits in Sweden =

Informational sign at the Swedish borders

90 km/h sign

Sweden has speed limits ranging from 30 km/h to 120 km/h (18 to 75 mph).

The speed limits are signposted with signs with yellow background, and otherwise looking like those in other European countries. There are no "end of speed limit" signs, and city name signs do not themselves impose a speed limit; both rules in contrast to most other countries in Europe. All speed limits are signposted with the actual speed limit value.

== Built up areas ==
30, 40, 50, 60 and 70 km/h (19, 25, 31, 37 and 43 mph) are used within towns and cities. 50 is used when there is no decision to have anything else. Outside schools and hospitals the limit is often 30 km/h.

Private areas such as company areas and camping sites can sign a lower limit than 30, which are only company rules but still can give penalty fees.

== Outside built up areas ==
70, 80, 90 and 100 km/h (43, 50, 56 and 62 mph) are mainly used outside built-up areas where the speed limit depends on the standard and safety of the road. In general 70 is used on small narrow roads or where regional roads are fairly narrow and curvy, or when no decision is made to have anything else. 80 is the most used limit on ordinary regional and main road when there is no middle barrier. 90 and 100 km/h may apply on roads without separate lanes, 100 mainly in northern Sweden. Roads with a middle barrier often has 100, and in northern Sweden they might have 110, even sometimes when it's not a motorway but a 2+1 road with crossings in same level.

== Motorways ==
100, 110 and 120 km/h (62, 68 and 75 mph) are the main speed limits on motorways. 120 km/h is only set on the best, safest and straightest motorways, usually the newest, which mostly are present in the southern parts of Sweden on the E4 and E6, in total about 300 km out of the 1500 total motorway km. 110 km/h is still the most common speed limit on motorways in Sweden. 100 is used on some motorways considered of lower standard or having high traffic volume.

Local exceptions to motorway speed limits may apply, mainly near cities and on inner-city motorways. One of the lowest speed limits on a Swedish inner-city motorway is 70 km/h (43 mph), present where there is high risk of traffic congestion. This has been set on short sections on E4 through Stockholm and on E6 through Gothenburg. On 70-limit (or less) multiple lane roads it is legal to overtake on the right, because it is considered that on congested roads it is better to avoid lane changes. Some stretches near large cities also have 80.

== History ==
Until 1967, some roads had no applicable speed limit. Before 1937 there were no legal speed limits, although motorists could still be charged with reckless driving. In 1937 a speed limit was introduced for built up areas. In the countryside, speed limits were introduced for selected roads in 1955. Following the driving side switch, strict limits of 60-80 km/h in the countryside were introduced temporarily, and unrestricted speeds were permanently abandoned.

From about 1990 to 1995, Sweden lowered the limit on motorways in the large city provinces from 110 km/h to 90 km/h (56 mph), which was the lowest in Europe at the time (together with Norway), citing environmental reasons. The term "large city province" was defined as a province including one of the three large cities with suburbs. This meant that the west coast motorway E6 had a 90 km/h limit on its (then) about 250 km of motorway, but some ordinary roads in less densely populated provinces had a 110 km/h limit. This reduced limit was later removed because it was neither popular nor well obeyed.

Until 2008, the law only permitted 30, 50, 70, 90 and 110 km/h. In general, 90 was used on regional and main roads. Many of those are lowered to 80 now. Roads in north Sweden which now have 100 previously usually had 110.

== Max speed limits ==
S.No	Vehicle	Max speed
01	Heavy Bus	100 km/h (90 km/h if not all occupants have seats with safety belts)
02	Heavy Truck	80 km/h (90 km/h on motorway)
03	Vehicles with Trailers	80 km/h
04	Towing another vehicle	30 km/h
05	Moped (Class 2)	25 km/h
06	Moped (Class 1)	45 km/h
07	Tractor A	30 km/h
08	Tractor B	50 km/h
09	Motorised Equipment (Class 2)	30 km/h
10	Motorised Equipment (Class 1)	50 km/h
11	Towed vehicles (Cabin)	30 km/h
12	Maximum Speed of Heavy Goods vehicle with a Trailer	80 km/h
13	30-Moped	30 km/h
