= Speedometer =

Speed gauge in motor vehicles

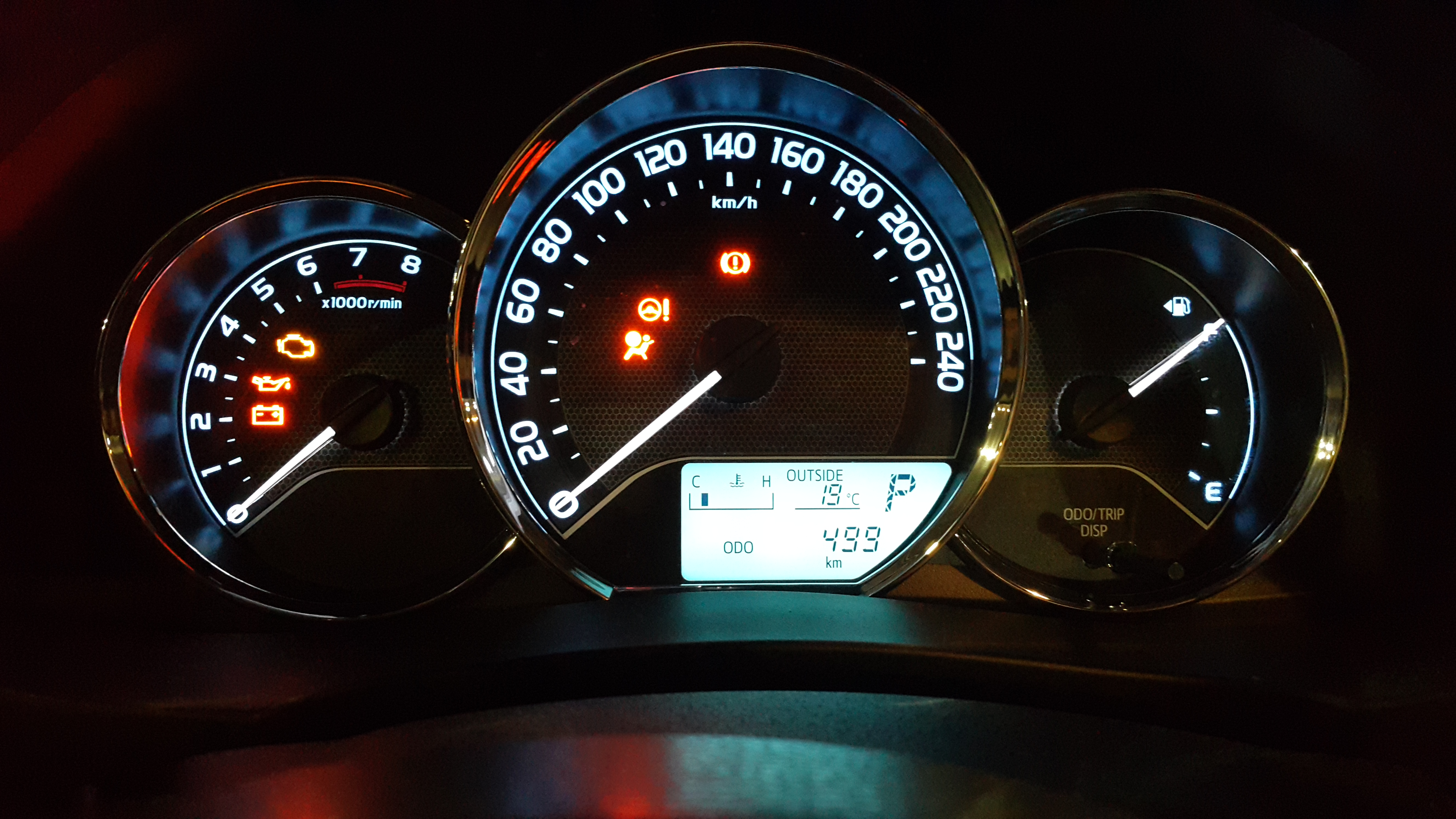
- A modern speedometer in a Toyota Corolla
- Classification: Gauge
- Industry: Automotive
- Application: Speed measurement
- Inventor: Josip Belušić
- Invented: 1888 (138 years ago)

An animation of an electronic Aston Martin speedometer's self-test routine, showing how an analogue speedometer hand may indicate the vehicle's speed

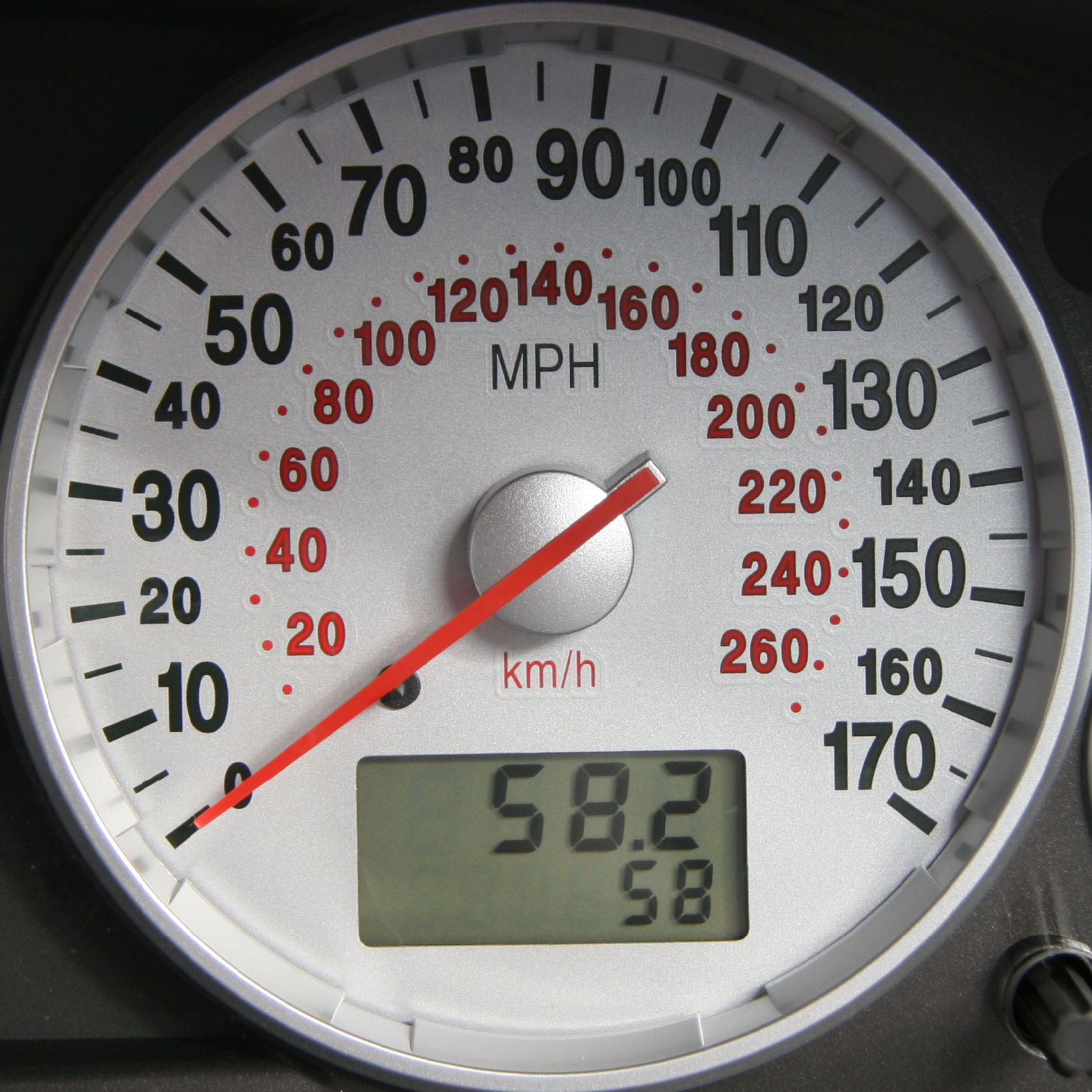
A Ford speedometer, showing both mph (outer) and km/h (inner), as well as an odometer in miles

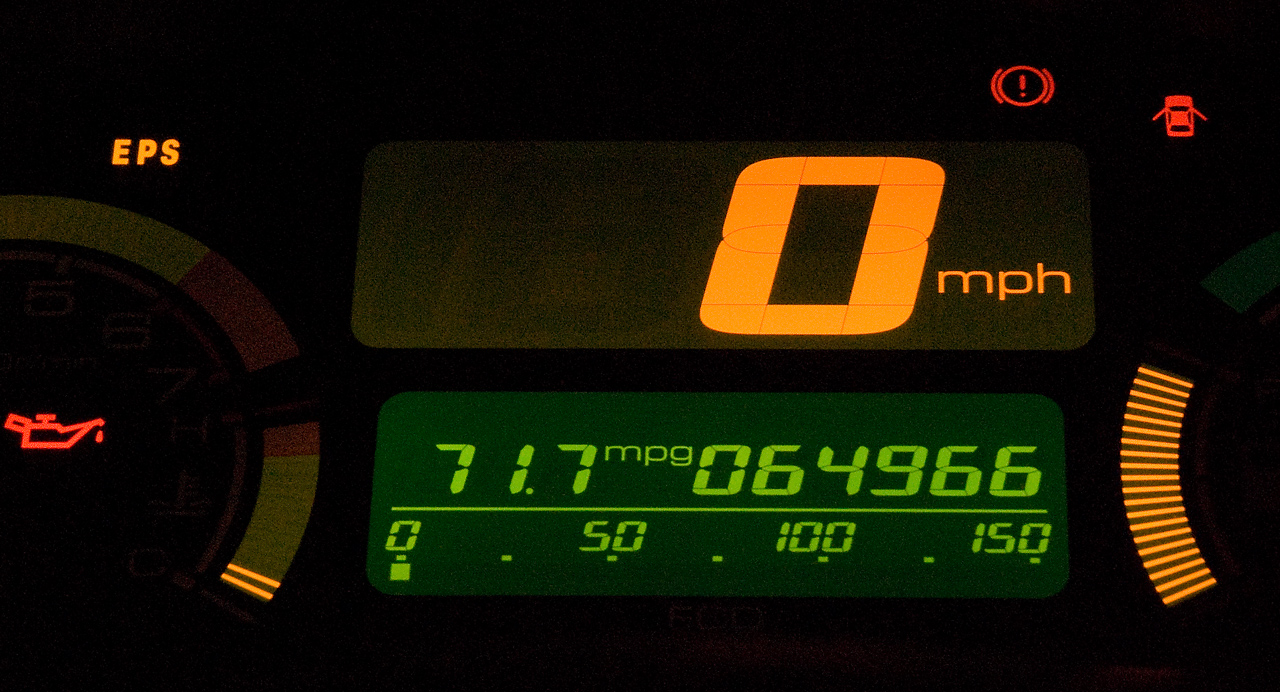
A digital, LCD speedometer in a Honda Insight

A speedometer or speed meter is a gauge that measures and displays the instantaneous speed of a vehicle. Now universally fitted to motor vehicles, they started to be available as options in the early 20th century, and as standard equipment from about 1910 onwards. Other vehicles may use devices analogous to the speedometer with different means of sensing speed, eg. boats use a pit log, while aircraft use an airspeed indicator.

Charles Babbage is credited with creating an early type of a speedometer, which was usually fitted to locomotives.

The electric speedometer was invented by the Croat Josip Belušić in 1888 and was originally called a velocimeter.

== History ==
The speedometer was originally patented by Josip Belušić (Giuseppe Bellussich) in 1888. He presented his invention at the 1889 Exposition Universelle in Paris. His invention had a pointer and a magnet, using electricity to work. German inventor Otto Schultze patented his version (which, like Belušić's, ran on eddy currents) on 7 October 1902.

== Operation ==
=== Mechanical ===
Many speedometers use a rotating flexible cable driven by gearing linked to the vehicle's transmission. The early Volkswagen Beetle and many motorcycles, however, use a cable driven from a front wheel.

Some early mechanical speedometers operated on the governor principle where a rotating weight acting against a spring moved further out as the speed increased, similar to the governor used on steam engines. This movement was transferred to the pointer to indicate speed.

This was followed by the Chronometric speedometer where the distance traveled was measured over a precise interval of time (Some Smiths speedometers used 3/4 of a second) measured by an escapement. This was transferred to the speedometer pointer. The chronometric speedometer is tolerant of vibration and was used in motorcycles up to the 1970s.

When the vehicle is in motion, a speedometer gear assembly turns a speedometer cable, which then turns the speedometer mechanism itself. A small permanent magnet affixed to the speedometer cable interacts with a small aluminium cup (called a speedcup) attached to the shaft of the pointer on the analogue speedometer instrument. As the magnet rotates near the cup, the changing magnetic field produces eddy current in the cup, which itself produces another magnetic field. The effect is that the magnet exerts a torque on the cup, "dragging" it, and thus the speedometer pointer, in the direction of its rotation with no mechanical connection between them.

The pointer shaft is held toward zero by a fine torsion spring. The torque on the cup increases with the speed of rotation of the magnet. Thus an increase in the speed of the car will twist the cup and speedometer pointer against the spring. The cup and pointer will turn until the torque of the eddy currents on the cup are balanced by the opposing torque of the spring, and then stop. Given the torque on the cup is proportional to the car's speed, and the spring's deflection is proportional to the torque, the angle of the pointer is also proportional to the speed, so that equally spaced markers on the dial can be used for gaps in speed. At a given speed, the pointer will remain motionless and point to the appropriate number on the speedometer's dial.

The return spring is calibrated such that a given revolution speed of the cable corresponds to a specific speed indication on the speedometer. This calibration must take into account several factors, including ratios of the tail shaft gears that drive the flexible cable, the final drive ratio in the differential, and the diameter of the driven tires.

One of the key disadvantages of the eddy current speedometer is that it cannot show the vehicle speed when running in reverse gear since the cup would turn in the opposite direction – in this scenario, the needle would be driven against its mechanical stop pin on the zero position.

=== Electronic ===
Many modern speedometers are electronic. In designs derived from earlier eddy-current models, a rotation sensor mounted in the transmission delivers a series of electronic pulses whose frequency corresponds to the (average) rotational speed of the driveshaft, and therefore the vehicle's speed, assuming the wheels have full traction. The sensor is typically a set of one or more magnets mounted on the output shaft or (in transaxles) differential crown wheel, or a toothed metal disk positioned between a magnet and a magnetic field sensor. As the part in question turns, the magnets or teeth pass beneath the sensor, each time producing a pulse in the sensor as they affect the strength of the magnetic field it is measuring. Alternatively, particularly in vehicles with multiplex wiring, some manufacturers use the pulses coming from the ABS wheel sensors which communicate to the instrument panel via the CAN Bus. Most modern electronic speedometers have the additional ability over the eddy current type to show the vehicle's speed when moving in reverse gear.

A computer converts the pulses to a speed and displays this speed on an electronically controlled, analogue-style needle or a digital display. Pulse information is also used for a variety of other purposes by the ECU or full-vehicle control system, e.g. triggering ABS or traction control, calculating average trip speed, or increment the odometer in place of it being turned directly by the speedometer cable.

Another early form of electronic speedometer relies upon the interaction between a precision watch mechanism and a mechanical pulsator driven by the car's wheel or transmission. The watch mechanism endeavours to push the speedometer pointer toward zero, while the vehicle-driven pulsator tries to push it toward infinity. The position of the speedometer pointer reflects the relative magnitudes of the outputs of the two mechanisms.

==== Virtual ====
Virtual speedometers typically approximate speed based on distance traveled over time with the help of a satellite radio navigation system, such as GPS. Virtual speedometers tend to be less accurate than their analog counterparts over short distances and are affected by environmental factors such as weather conditions, terrain, and obstructions in the way of the signal.

==== Bicycle speedometers ====
Typical bicycle speedometers measure the time between each wheel revolution and give a readout on a small, handlebar-mounted digital display. The sensor is mounted on the bike at a fixed location, pulsing when the spoke-mounted magnet passes by. In this way, it is analogous to an electronic car speedometer using pulses from an ABS sensor, but with a much cruder time/distance resolution – typically one pulse/display update per revolution, or as seldom as once every 2–3 seconds at low speed with a 26-inch (660 mm) wheel. However, this is rarely a critical problem, and the system provides frequent updates at higher road speeds where the information is of more importance. The low pulse frequency also has little impact on measurement accuracy, as these digital devices can be programmed by wheel size, or additionally by wheel or tire circumference to make distance measurements more accurate and precise than a typical motor vehicle gauge. However, these devices carry some minor disadvantages in requiring power from batteries that must be replaced every so often in the receiver (and sensor, for wireless models), and, in wired models, the signal is carried by a thin cable that is much less robust than that used for brakes, gears, or cabled speedometers.

Other, usually older bicycle speedometers are cable driven from one or other wheel, as in the motorcycle speedometers described above. These do not require battery power, but can be relatively bulky and heavy, and may be less accurate. The turning force at the wheel may be provided either from a gearing system at the hub (making use of the presence of e.g. a hub brake, cylinder gear, or dynamo) as per a typical motorcycle, or with a friction wheel device that pushes against the outer edge of the rim (same position as rim brakes, but on the opposite edge of the fork) or the sidewall of the tire itself. The former type is quite reliable and low maintenance but needs a gauge and hub gearing properly matched to the rim and tire size, whereas the latter requires little or no calibration for a moderately accurate readout (with standard tires, the "distance" covered in each wheel rotation by a friction wheel set against the rim should scale fairly linearly with wheel size, almost as if it were rolling along the ground itself) but are unsuitable for off-road use, and must be kept properly tensioned and clean of road dirt to avoid slipping or jamming.

== Error ==
Most speedometers have tolerances of some ±10%, mainly due to variations in tire diameter. Sources of error due to tire diameter variations are wear, temperature, pressure, vehicle load, and nominal tire size. Vehicle manufacturers usually calibrate speedometers to read high by an amount equal to the average error, to ensure that their speedometers never indicate a lower speed than the actual speed of the vehicle, to ensure they are not liable for drivers violating speed limits.

Excessive speedometer errors after manufacture can come from several causes, but most commonly is due to nonstandard tire diameter, in which case the error is:
$$\mbox {Percentage error} = 100\times\left(1 - \frac \mbox{new diameter} \mbox{standard diameter}\right)$$

Nearly all tires now have their size is shown as "T/A_W" on the side of the tire (See: Tire code), and the tires.

$$\mbox {Diameter in millimetres} = 2 \times T \times A / 100 + W \times 25.4$$
$$\mbox {Diameter in inches} = T \times A / 1270 + W$$

For example, a standard tire is "185/70R14" with diameter = 2*185*(70/100)+(14*25.4) = 614.6 mm (185x70/1270 + 14 = 24.20 in). Another is "195/50R15" with 2*195*(50/100)+(15*25.4) = 576.0 mm (195x50/1270 + 15 = 22.68 in). Replacing the first tire (and wheels) with the second (on 15" = 381 mm wheels), a speedometer reads 100 * ((614.6/576) - 1) = 100 * (24.20/22.68 - 1) = 6.7% higher than the actual speed. At an actual speed of 100 km/h (62 mph), the speedometer will indicate 100 x 1.067 = 106.7 km/h (62 * 1.067 = 66.15 mph), approximately.

In the case of wear, a new "185/70R14" tire of 620 mm (24.4 inch) diameter will have ≈8 mm tread depth, at legal limit this reduces to 1.6 mm, the difference being 12.8 mm in diameter or 0.5 inches which is 2% in 620 mm (24.4 inches).

=== International agreements ===
In many countries the legislated error in speedometer readings is ultimately governed by the United Nations Economic Commission for Europe (UNECE) Regulation 39, which covers those aspects of vehicle type approval that relate to speedometers. The main purpose of the UNECE regulations is to facilitate trade in motor vehicles by agreeing on uniform type approval standards rather than requiring a vehicle model to undergo different approval processes in each country where it is sold.

European Union member states must also grant type approval to vehicles meeting similar EU standards. The ones covering speedometers are similar to the UNECE regulation in that they specify that:

- The indicated speed must never be less than the actual speed, i.e. it should not be possible to inadvertently speed because of an incorrect speedometer reading.
- The indicated speed must not be more than 110 percent of the true speed plus 4 km/h (2.5 mph) at specified test speeds. For example, at 80 km/h (50 mph), the indicated speed must be no more than 92 km/h (57 mph).

The standards specify both the limits on accuracy and many of the details of how it should be measured during the approvals process. For example, the test measurements should be made (for most vehicles) at 40, 80 and 120 km/h (25, 50 and 75 mph), and at a particular ambient temperature and road surface. There are slight differences between the different standards, for example in the minimum accuracy of the equipment measuring the true speed of the vehicle.

The UNECE regulation relaxes the requirements for vehicles mass-produced following type approval. At Conformity of Production Audits the upper limit on indicated speed is increased to 110 percent plus 6 km/h (3.7 mph) for cars, buses, trucks, and similar vehicles, and 110 percent plus 8 km/h (5.0 mph) for two- or three-wheeled vehicles that have a maximum speed above 50 km/h (31 mph) (or a cylinder capacity, if powered by a heat engine, of more than 50 cm^{3} (3.1 cu in)). European Union Directive 2000/7/EC, which relates to two- and three-wheeled vehicles, provides similar slightly relaxed limits in production.

=== Australia ===
There were no Australian Design Rules in place for speedometers in Australia before July 1988. They had to be introduced when speed cameras were first used. This means there are no legally accurate speedometers for these older vehicles. All vehicles manufactured on or after 1 July 2007, and all models of vehicle introduced on or after 1 July 2006, must conform to UNECE Regulation 39.

The speedometers in vehicles manufactured before these dates but after 1 July 1995 (or 1 January 1995 for forward control passenger vehicles and off-road passenger vehicles) must conform to the previous Australian design rule. This specifies that they need only display the speed to an accuracy of ±10% at speeds above 40 km/h, and there is no specified accuracy at all for speeds below 40 km/h.

All vehicles manufactured in Australia or imported for supply to the Australian market must comply with the Australian Design Rules. The state and territory governments may set policies for the tolerance of speed over the posted speed limits that may be lower than the 10% in the earlier versions of the Australian Design Rules permitted, such as in Victoria. This has caused some controversy since it would be possible for a driver to be unaware that they are speeding should their vehicle be fitted with an under-reading speedometer.

=== United Kingdom ===
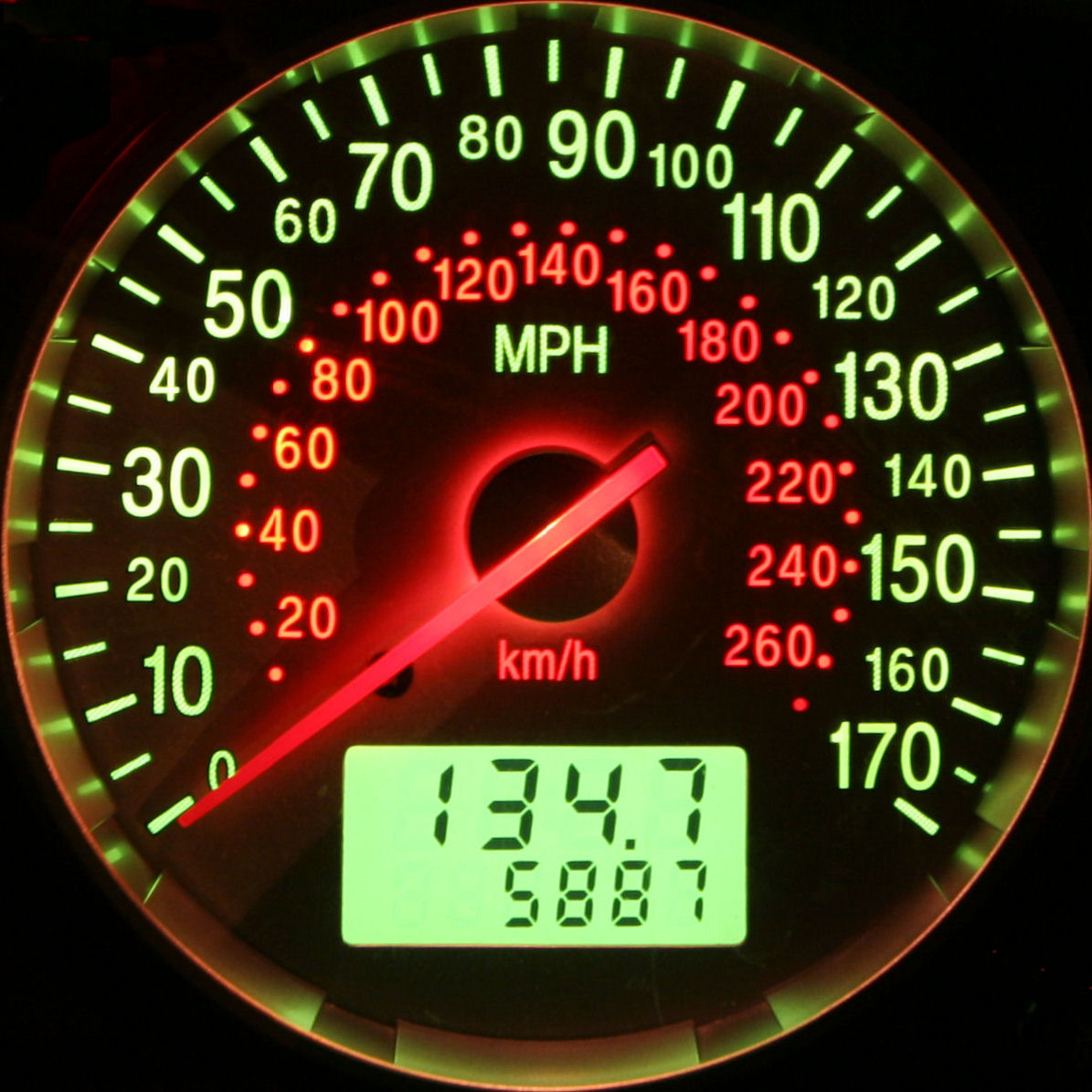
A speedometer showing mph and km/h along with an odometer and a separate "trip" odometer (both showing distance traveled in miles)

The amended Road Vehicles (Construction and Use) Regulations 1986 permits the use of speedometers that meet either the requirements of EC Council Directive 75/443 (as amended by Directive 97/39) or UNECE Regulation 39.

The Motor Vehicles (Approval) Regulations 2001 permits single vehicles to be approved. As with the UNECE regulation and the EC Directives, the speedometer must never show an indicated speed less than the actual speed. However, it differs slightly from them in specifying that for all actual speeds between 25 mph and 70 mph (or the vehicles' maximum speed if it is lower than this), the indicated speed must not exceed 110% of the actual speed, plus 6.25 mph.

For example, if the vehicle is actually traveling at 50 mph, the speedometer must not show more than 61.25 mph or less than 50 mph.

=== United States ===
Federal standards in the United States allow a maximum 5 mph error at a speed of 50 mph on speedometer readings for commercial vehicles. Aftermarket modifications, such as different tire and wheel sizes or different differential gearing, can cause speedometer inaccuracy.

== Regulation in the US ==
Starting with US automobiles manufactured on or after 1 September 1979, the NHTSA required speedometers to have a special emphasis on 55 mph (90 km/h) and display no more than a maximum speed of 85 mph (136 km/h). On 25 March 1982, the NHTSA revoked the rule because no "significant safety benefits" could come from maintaining the standard.

== GPS ==
GPS devices can measure speeds in two ways:

1. The first and simpler method is based on how far the receiver has moved since the last measurement. Such speed calculations are not subject to the same sources of error as the vehicle's speedometer (wheel size, transmission/drive ratios). Instead, the GPS's positional accuracy, and therefore the accuracy of its calculated speed, is dependent on the satellite signal quality at the time. Speed calculations will be more accurate at higher speeds when the ratio of positional error to positional change is lower. The GPS software may also use a moving average calculation to reduce error. Some GPS devices do not take into account the vertical position of the car so will under-report the speed by the road's gradient.
2. Alternatively, the GPS may take advantage of the Doppler effect to estimate its velocity. In ideal conditions, the accuracy for commercial devices is within 0.2–0.5 km/h, but it may worsen if the signal quality degrades.

As mentioned in the satnav article, GPS data has been used to overturn a speeding ticket; the GPS logs showed the defendant traveling below the speed limit when they were ticketed. That the data came from a GPS device was likely less important than the fact that it was logged; logs from the vehicle's speedometer could likely have been used instead, had they existed.

== See also ==
- Airspeed indicator, flight instrument
- Hubometer, axle-mounted distance measuring device
- Paceometer, instrument displaying the time a given-distance journey will take based on speed, counteracting time-saving bias
- Tachometer, instrument measuring the rotation speed of a shaft or disk
- Taximeter, mechanical or electronic device for calculating passenger fares
