= Speed limits in Mexico =

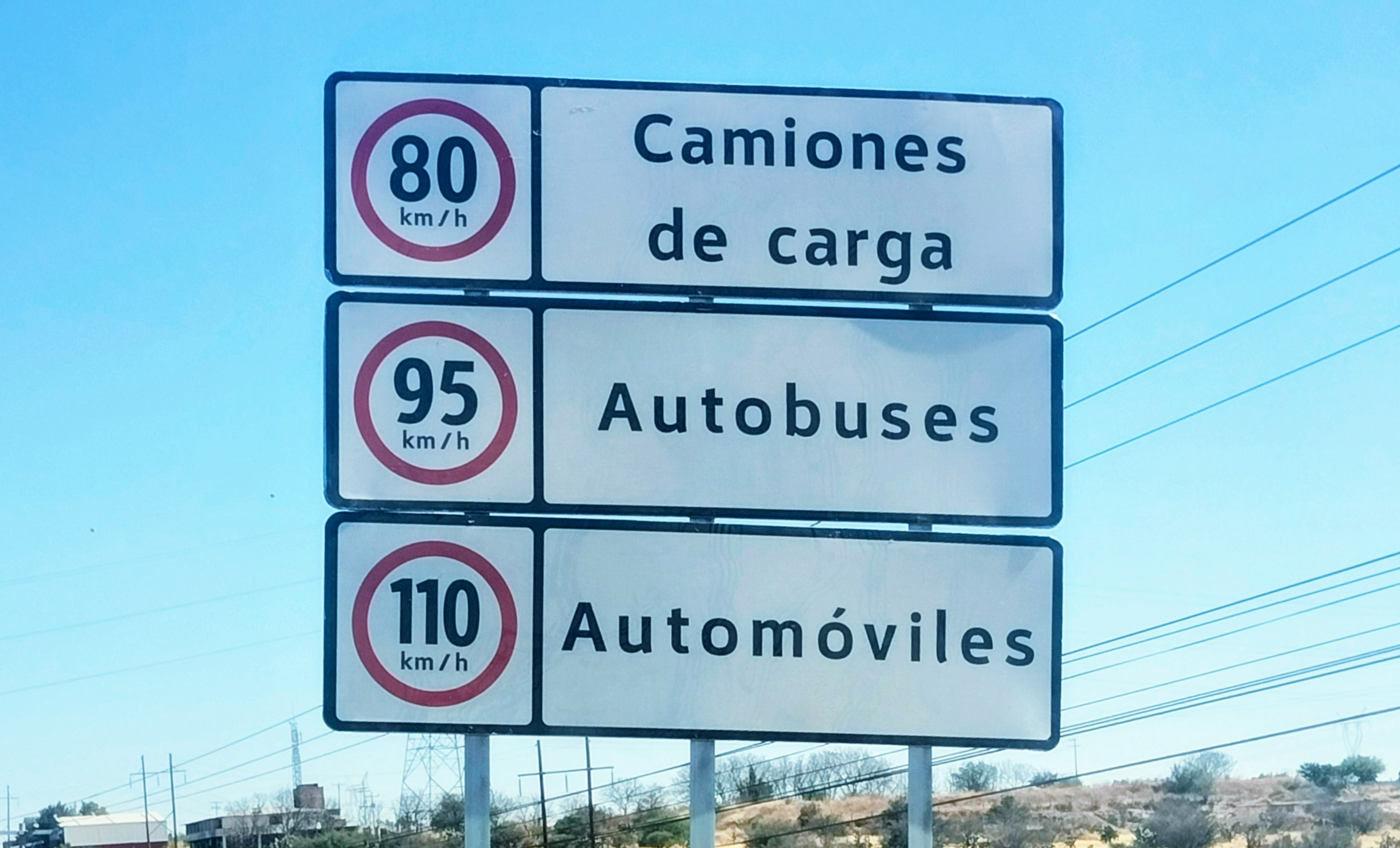
Road sign indicating different limits for different types of vehicles.

The first maximum speed law for Mexico was created in 1903 by then president Porfirio Díaz. It established a maximum of 10 km/h (6 mph) for small and crowded streets, and 40 km/h (25 mph) elsewhere.

Current speed limits are:

- 10 km/h (6 mph) in parking lots and residential areas.
- 60 km/h (37 mph) in streets with no speed limit.
- 60–80 km/h (37–50 mph) on urban arterial roads (ejes, calzadas, beltways and freeways).
- 80 km/h (50 mph) in avenues with no speed limit.
- 70–90 km/h (43–56 mph) on rural two-lane roads.
- 90 km/h (56 mph) on two-lane highways.
- 90–100 km/h (56–62 mph) on major highways inside cities.
- 100 km/h (62 mph) on major highways leaving or approaching towns or cities.
- 110 km/h (68 mph) on major highways.

No Mexican highway allows going beyond 110 km/h, but the speed limit is enforced generally above 130 km/h (81 mph) only.
