= Sveta Nedelja, Istria =

Sveta Nedelja Santa Domenica
- Municipality
- Sveta Nedelja Municipality
- Flag

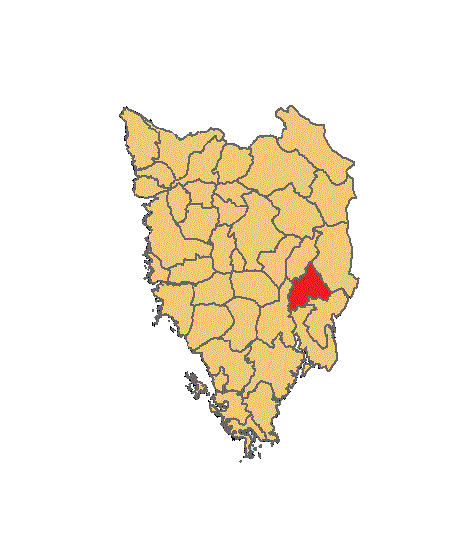
- Location of Sveta Nedelja in Istria
- Interactive map of Sveta Nedelja
- Location within Croatia
- Coordinates: 45°08′32″N 14°06′41″E
- Country: Croatia
- County: Istria County

Area
  - Total: 2,312 sq mi (5,988 km^{2})

Population (2021)
  - Total: 2,898
  - Density: 1.253/sq mi (0.4840/km^{2})
- Time zone: UTC+1 (CET)
  - Summer (DST): UTC+2 (CEST)
- Area code: 52
- Website: sv-nedelja.hr

Sveta Nedelja (Italian: Santa Domenica, also Santa Domenica d'Albona; takes its name from Saint Kyriake = Sancta Dominica; Venetian: Santa Domenega) is a municipality of twenty villages in west Croatia. The three largest villages are municipal seat Nedešćina (604), Štrmac (439) and Šumber (village with castle, 381). Sveta Nedelja is located on a high plateau above the Raša river valley and in the hinterland of the town of Labin.

== Demographics ==
According to the 2021 census, its population was 2,898. It was 2,987 in 2011.

The municipality consists of the following 21 settlement:

- Cere, population 36
- Eržišće, population 47
- Frančići, population 39
- Jurazini, population 91
- Kraj Drage, population 54
- Mali Golji, population 102
- Mali Turini, population 37
- Marići, population 75
- Markoci, population 69
- Nedešćina, population 537
- Paradiž, population 70
- Ružići, population 110
- Santalezi, population 168
- Snašići, population 103
- Sveti Martin, population 169
- Štrmac, population 396
- Šumber, population 358
- Veli Golji, population 63
- Veli Turini, population 39
- Vrećari, population 199
- Županići, population 136
Sveta Nedelja: Population trends 1857–2021
v

population	2709	2815	3011	3184	3603	3954	5946	6473	4616	4415	4113	3562	3308	3087	2909	2987	2898
	1857	1869	1880	1890	1900	1910	1921	1931	1948	1953	1961	1971	1981	1991	2001	2011	2021

Note:Emerged from old Labin municipality. In 1857, 1869, 1921 and 1931 contains part of the data of the town Labin and municipality Raša, while in 1880 only of town Labin. In 1857, 1869, 1921 and 1931 part of the data is contained in municipality Kršan and Raša. Sources: Croatian Bureau of Statistics publications
