= Karmen Kokot =

Croatian handball player

Personal information
- Nationality: Croatian
- Born: Labin, SR Croatia, SFR Yugoslavia

Sport
- Sport: Handball

Karmen Kokot is a Croatian former handball player.

Born in Labin, Istria, she played for local club ŽRK Rudar Labin. She was part of the golden generation of ŽRK Rudar Labin's players who played in the Yugoslav Premier League.

As a youth, Kokot played for Yugoslavia women's national junior handball team. She was named best player of the Yugoslavian junior league playing for Rudar, and became a standard player in Yugolavia's national team. She also played for Yugoslavia women's national handball team with the B team.

In 2011, at an event in occasion of the signing of a cooperation agreement between Mladi Rudar Labin and the Balić - Metličić Academy, presided by many former handball players, including Ivano Balić, Lorena Beučić, Adriana Prosenjak, Ornela Paliska and Valner Franković, she performed at an exhibition game with the other greatest players in Labin's history, including Prosenjak, Paliska and Ingrid Zuliani.
