= Ornela Paliska =

Yugoslav handball player

Personal information
- Nationality: Croatian
- Born: Labin, NR Croatia, FNR Yugoslavia

Sport
- Sport: Handball
Medal record
Women's handball
Representing Yugoslavia
U-20 World Championship
Gold medal – first place	1977 Romania	U-20 Team

Ornela Paliska is a Yugoslav former handball player.

She started playing handball for Labin's ŽRK Rudar Labin. She was part of ŽRK Rudar Labin's golden generation that played in the Yugoslav First League with Rudar.

In 1977 she was, together with Lorena Beučić, Biserka Emer, Ema Gabrić, Željka Maras, Snježana Perić and Jasna Ptujec, one of the six Croatian players who were part of the broader Yugoslavia women's national junior handball team that won the gold at the 1977 Women's Junior World Handball Championship in Romania. It is the only gold won by Yugoslavia women's national junior handball team at the World Championship.

In 2011, at an event in occasion of the signing of a cooperation agreement between Mladi Rudar Labin and the Balić - Metličić Academy, presided by many former handball players, including Ivano Balić, Lorena Beučić, Adriana Prosenjak, Karmen Kokot and Valner Franković, she performed at an exhibition game with the other greatest players in Labin's history, including Kokot, Prosenjak and Ingrid Zuliani.

Also several other members of her family were handball players.
