= Nansi Tireli =

Croatian entrepreneur and politician (born 1965)

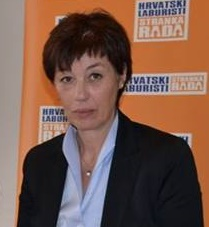

Member of Parliament
- In office 22 December 2011 – 14 October 2016
- President: Ivo Josipović (2011–2015) Kolinda Grabar-Kitarović (2015–2016)
- Prime Minister: Zoran Milanović (2011–2016) Tihomir Orešković (2016)
- Constituency: VIII electoral district

2nd President of the Croatian Labourists – Labour Party
- In office 15 February 2015 – 20 March 2016
- Preceded by: Dragutin Lesar
- Succeeded by: Tomislav Končevski

Personal details
- Born: 26 February 1965 (age 61) Vinež, SR Croatia, SFR Yugoslavia
- Party: Croatian Labourists – Labour Party (2010–2016)
- Education: Polytechnic of Rijeka
- Occupation: Politician

Nansi Tireli (born 26 February 1965) is a Croatian entrepreneur and politician who served as the 2nd president of the left-wing Croatian Labour Party and as a member of the Croatian Parliament for VIII electoral district between 2011 and 2016.

== Early life ==
Nansi Tireli was born in small village Vinež near Labin in Istria. She graduated from Polytechnic of Rijeka with diploma in Economy of Entrepreneurship. She has been working as private entrepreneur since she graduated.

== Political career ==
Nansi Tireli was a member of the left-wing Croatian Labour Party. She was elected to the Croatian parliament for the first time in 2011 elections. On July 14, 2016, it was announced that Labour Party suspended Tireli because she made a harm to the Party's reputation with some of her statements made in a radio show day before. She reacted by voluntarily resigning from the party membership.

=== In the Croatian Parliament ===
In the 7th Parliament assembly, she served as a President of the "Parliament Committee for Gender Equality" and member of the Committees for "Health and Social Policy" and "Interparliamentary Cooperation". She was a member of "National Council for Monitoring the Implementation of Anti-Corruption Strategy", as well as Deputy member of the "Delegation to the Parliamentary Assembly of the Council of Europe".

After Dragutin Lesar resigned as Labour party president, Tireli become acting president for next 7 months. At the Party's elections held on February 15, 2015, she was elected as new party president with votes of 117 out of 186 delegates. During her term as Party president she managed to get Labour party into the major national coalition of center-left parties, Croatia is Growing and win 3 seats for her party in the 2015 elections but nevertheless, the coalition lost and she joined the opposition.

On 20 March 2016, Tireli lost in the Labour party presidential elections to Tomislav Končevski.

== Private life ==
Mrs. Tireli is divorced and has two children, daughter Ana and son Robert.
