= Duga Luka =

Duga Luka refers to the following places:

- Duga Luka, Croatia
- Duga Luka, Serbia
