= Černjul =

Černjul or Cernjul is a South Slavic surname. Notable people with the surname include:

- Carmen Cernjul (born 2007), Swedish runner
- Maruša Černjul (born 1992), Slovene athlete
- Tino Černjul (born 1973), Croatian handballer
