= Remmia gens =

Ancient Roman family

The gens Remmia, occasionally written Remia, was an obscure plebeian family at ancient Rome. Only a few members of this gens are mentioned in history, of whom the most illustrious was the grammarian Quintus Remmius Palaemon, but many others are known from inscriptions.

== Origin ==
The Remmii claimed descent from Remus, the twin brother of Romulus, the legendary founder and first King of Rome. Although the traditions relating to them date back to at least the fourth century BC, Romulus and Remus are not generally regarded as historical figures, and in the Greek authors Remus is generally called Romus, for which the apparent diminutive Romulus might be regarded as a doublet. However, the nomen Remmius could still be derived from Remus, perhaps a cognomen of uncertain derivation. Chase classifies it among the gentilicia that either originated at Rome, or cannot be shown to have come from anywhere else. Schulze, on the other hand, regards it as an Etruscan name, rem-ne, perhaps sharing a root with place names such as Remona and Remoria.

== Praenomina ==
The Remmii largely confined themselves to the most common praenomina, particularly Marcus, Lucius, Gaius, Publius, and Quintus. One of the women of this gens bore the feminine praenomen Prima. Other women of the Remmii bore individualizing surnames derived from old praenomina, identical in form but placed at the end of the name, like cognomina, including Maxima, Octavia, Salvia, and Secunda, as well as Tertullina, a diminutive of Tertia.

== Branches and cognomina ==
The only distinct family of the Remmii under the Republic bore the surname Rufus, originally given to someone with red hair. Most of the other surnames of the Remmii seem to have been personal cognomina, many of them belonging to freedmen, and indicating their original names. Of those that represent traditional Roman surnames, Faustus, fortunate, was an old praenomen that came to be widely used as a cognomen in the late Republic and imperial times. Felix means "happy", Festus "joyous" or "festive", Fidelis "faithful", Fortis "strong", Fructa "fruitful", Fructuosa "very fruitful", Jucundus "pleasant", Scaeva "left-handed" or "unlucky", and Severus "stern" or "severe". Three of the Remmii were named after months, and bore Januarius, Aprilis, and December as surnames.

== Members ==
This list includes abbreviated praenomina. For an explanation of this practice, see filiation.

- Remmius, aedile with Marcus Livius Drusus circa 94 BC. He might be the same Remmius who authored a law against calumnia, or slander, first referred to in the time of Sulla; but the date of the law is very uncertain.
- Marcus Remmius Rufus, one of the duumvirs at Herculaneum in Campania, together with his son, Marcus, some time between 40 and 20 BC.
- Marcus Remmius M. f. Rufus, served as duumvir at Herculaneum, alongside his father, Marcus, some time between 40 and 20 BC.
- Lucius Remmius Terius, buried at the present site of Omoscice, formerly part of Venetia and Histria, together with Ennia, perhaps his wife, in the late first century BC or early first century AD.
- Remia Secunda, the daughter of Maximus, was buried at Rotium in Venetia and Histria, aged forty.
- Marcus Remmius Jucundus, one of the friends of Lucius Munius Gnomon and Quintus Volumnius Amphio, who dedicated a monument at Rome in their memory in AD 9.
- Lucius Remmius M. f., buried at Patavium in Venetia and Histria, with his sister, Remmia Festa, in the first half of the first century AD.
- Remmia M. f. Festa, buried at Patavium with her brother, Lucius Remmius, in the first half of the first century AD.
- Quintus Remmius Palaemon, a freedman from Vicentia in Venetia and Histria, who became the most famous grammarian at Rome during the early and middle first century AD. He was the tutor of Quintilian, but his moral character was so scandalous that both Tiberius and Claudius regarded it as folly to place young men in hie care.
- Remmius, commander of the soldiers tasked with guarding Vonones, slew the king soon after he was recaptured. Perhaps the same person as Gaius Remmius Rufus.
- Marcus Remmius M. l. Felicio, a freedman serving in a century of soldiers stationed at Herculaneum.
- Marcus Remmius M. l. Nicanor, a freedman serving in a century of soldiers stationed at Herculaneum.
- Marcus Remmius Successus, a soldier in a century stationed at Herculaneum.
- Quintus Remmius Januarius, built a tomb at Rome for himself and his wife of thirty-two years, Memmia Zelis, dating to the first or second century.

=== Undated Remmii ===
- Remmia, buried at Rome, with a monument from her husband, Quintus Luscius.
- Prima Remmia, mother of Marcus Aebutius Suavis, named in an inscription from Rome.
- Marcus Remmius M. f. Andria, named in an inscription from Altinum in Venetia and Histria.
- Remmia Apollonia, buried at Rome with her daughter and husband, the son of Victorinius Telesphorus.
- Titus Remmius Apollonius, named in inscriptions from Ostia and Bovillae in Latium.
- Gaius Remius Aprilis, buried at Ammaedara in Africa Proconsularis aged forty, with a monument from his wife, Cattula.
- Remmia P. l. Arbuscula, a freedwoman named in an inscription from Aveia in Samnium.
- Remmia Chrysoporusa, named in an inscription from Rusicade in Numidia.
- Remmia Daphne, buried at Rome in a tomb built by her husband, Claudius Alexander.
- Lucius Remmius Exsuper[...], buried at Sulci in Sardinia, with a monument from his wife, Claudia Pompeia, and Remmia, perhaps his daughter.
- Lucius Remmius Faustus, together with his son, Avitus, donated money for a temple and statue of Saturn, according to an inscription found at Ben Glaia, formerly part of Africa.
- Gaius Remmius C. f. Felix, buried at Ammaedara, aged twenty-one.
- Publius Remmius Felix, named on a number of pieces of pottery from Carnuntum and Vindobona in Pannonia Superior.
- Gaius Remmius Festus, buried at Altinum.
- Publius Remmius Fidelis, made an offering to Victoria at Novaria in Cisalpine Gaul.
- Gaius Remmius Floridus, buried at Thugga in Africa Proconsularis, aged fifty-five.
- Sextus Remmius Fortis, named in an inscription found at Valladolid, formerly part of Hispania Citerior.
- Remmia Fructa, buried at Thugga, aged sixty-five.
- Remmia Fructuosa, buried at Thugga, aged sixty-three.
- Remia Hedone, buried at Rome, aged forty-five, with a monument from her husband, Aulus Sulpicius Felix.
- Remmius Januarius, named in a list of donors to an unidentified cause at Castellum Tidditanorum in Numidia.
- Remmia Justa, buried at Clusium in Etruria.
- Remmia L. f. Maxima, buried at Arba in Dalmatia, aged twenty-seven years, eleven months, and twenty-seven days, with a monument dedicated by her mother.
- Remmia C. f. Octavia, the wife of Gaius Publicius Quartio, and mother of Gaius Publicius Verus and Publicia Severa, buried with her family at Verona in Venetia and Histria, with a tomb built by her daughter.
- Marcus Remmius Philadelphus, named in an inscription from Rome, dedicated to Petronia, a freedwoman.
- Marcus Remmius M. l. Philer[o?], a freedman buried at Rome, together with Pompeia Prima, a freedwoman, and Sextus Pompeius Statius, another freedman.
- Marcus Remmius M. l. Philodamus, a freedman buried at Rome, together with Annia Tertia, a freedwoman.
- Remmia C. l. Polinis, a freedwoman buried at Rome, together with Gaius Murranus Diphilus, a freedman.
- Gaius Remmius P. f. Rufus, a soldier in the praetorian guard, named in an inscription from Patavium. Some scholars have proposed that he was the soldier who cut down Vonones.
- Publius Remius Q. f. Ruga, buried at Pola in Venetia and Histria.
- Gaius Remmius Sallustianus, buried at Thugga, aged fifty-eight.
- Remmia P. l. Salvia, a freedwoman named in an inscription from Aveia.
- Lucius Remmius M. f. Scaeva, named in an inscription from Forum Livii in Cisalpine Gaul.
- Remmia C. f. Secunda, buried at Ammaedara, aged twenty-eight.
- Quintus Remmius Serandus, named in an inscription from Vicetia in Venetia and Histria.
- Gaius Remmius Severus, a bucinator, or hornblower, serving in an unidentified unit of soldiers stationed at Ravena.
- Remmia Tertullina Mustelica, buried at Ammaedara, aged twenty-three, with a monument from her husband, Gaius Titius Clemens.

== See also ==
- List of Roman gentes

== Bibliography ==
- Marcus Tullius Cicero, Pro Sexto Roscio Amerino.
- Incertus Auctor, De Viris Illustribus (The Lives of Famous Men).
- Decimus Junius Juvenalis, Satirae (Satires).
- Publius Cornelius Tacitus, Annales.
- Gaius Suetonius Tranquillus, De Illustribus Grammaticis (The Illustrious Grammarians).
- Eusebius Sophronius Hieronymus (St. Jerome), In Chronicon Eusebii (The Chronicon of Eusebius).
- Scholia Gronoviana, In Ciceronis Pro Roscio Amerino (Commentary on Cicero's Oration Pro Roscio Amerino).
- Dictionary of Greek and Roman Biography and Mythology, William Smith, ed., Little, Brown and Company, Boston (1849).
- Bullettino della Commissione Archeologica Comunale in Roma (Bulletin of the Municipal Archaeological Commission of Rome, abbreviated BCAR), (1872–present).
- Wilhelm Henzen, Ephemeris Epigraphica: Corporis Inscriptionum Latinarum Supplementum (Journal of Inscriptions: Supplement to the Corpus Inscriptionum Latinarum, abbreviated EE), Institute of Roman Archaeology, Rome (1872–1913).
- Notizie degli Scavi di Antichità (News of Excavations from Antiquity, abbreviated NSA), Accademia dei Lincei (1876–present).
- Supplementa Italica (Supplement for Italy, abbreviated SupIt), Unione Accademica Nazionale (1884–present).
- Bulletin Archéologique du Comité des Travaux Historiques et Scientifiques (Archaeological Bulletin of the Committee on Historic and Scientific Works, abbreviated BCTH), Imprimerie Nationale, Paris (1885–1973).
- René Cagnat et alii, L'Année épigraphique (The Year in Epigraphy, abbreviated AE), Presses Universitaires de France (1888–present).
- August Pauly, Georg Wissowa, et alii, Realencyclopädie der Classischen Altertumswissenschaft (Scientific Encyclopedia of the Knowledge of Classical Antiquities, abbreviated RE or PW), J. B. Metzler, Stuttgart (1894–1980).
- George Davis Chase, "The Origin of Roman Praenomina", in Harvard Studies in Classical Philology, vol. VIII, pp. 103–184 (1897).
- Paul von Rohden, Elimar Klebs, & Hermann Dessau, Prosopographia Imperii Romani (The Prosopography of the Roman Empire, abbreviated PIR), Berlin (1898).
- Wilhelm Schulze, Zur Geschichte lateinischer Eigennamen (The History of Latin Proper Names), Weidmannsche Buchhandlung, Berlin (1904).
- Stéphane Gsell, Inscriptions Latines de L'Algérie (Latin Inscriptions from Algeria, abbreviated ILAlg), Edouard Champion, Paris (1922–present).
- Inscriptiones Italiae (Inscriptions from Italy, abbreviated InscrIt), Rome (1931–present).
- Herbert Bloch, "The Roman Brick-stamps Not Published in Volume XV 1 of Corpus Inscriptionum Latinarum" in Harvard Studies in Classical Philology, vols. LVI, LVII (1947).
- T. Robert S. Broughton, The Magistrates of the Roman Republic, American Philological Association (1952–1986).
- Anna Sadurska, Inscriptions Latines & Monuments Funéraires Romains au Musée National de Varsovie (Latin Inscriptions and Roman Monuments from the National Museum of Warsaw, abbreviated ILVarsovie), Warsaw (1953).
- Cronache Ercolanesi: Bollettino del Centro Internazionale per lo studio dei papiri Ercolanesi (Chronicles of Herculaneum: Bulletin of the International Center for the Study of Herculanean Papyri), Naples (1971–present).
- Michael Grant, Roman Myths, Dorset Press (1971).
- John C. Traupman, The New College Latin & English Dictionary, Bantam Books, New York (1995).
- Andrea Mazzer, I recinti funerari in area Altinate: le iscrizioni con indicazione di pedatura (The Funeral Enclosures in the Neighbourhood of Altino: the Inscriptions with an Indication of their Pedatura), Fondazione Antonio Colluto, Portogruaro (2005).
