= ŽRK Zamet =

Women's handball club

- Full name: Ženski rukometni klub Zamet
- Founded: 1957
- Arena: Centar Zamet
- Capacity: 2,350
- President: Iva Lesjak
- Head coach: Drago Žiljak
- League: First League
- 2023–24: 10th
- Club colours
Home	Away

ŽRK Zamet (Ženski rukometni Klub Zamet) is a women's handball club from Rijeka, Croatia, formed in 1957. The club currently competes in the Croatian First League and the Croatian Handball Cup.

== History ==
The club was founded in September 1957 as RK Partizan Zamet by Prof. Stanko Jerger, Josip Šarić and Vittorio Drog. On the initiative of Stanko Jerger, the women's team was made later. Until January 1985, the club was combined with RK Zamet.

In 1962, the players of Partizan Zamet went to the quarter-finals of the Yugoslav Cup where they lost 6:5 to Zagreb. The next year, they finished second in the Croatian championship and failed to qualify for the First League, being one point behind Partizan Bjelovar. They failed to qualify for the next three seasons. In 1966, Zamet eliminated ŽRK Rudar Labin in the qualifications for entering the first league. From 1971 to 1974, the club played in the Yugoslav First League. After 1974, the club played in the second tier of the Yugoslav Women's Handball Championship until the collapse of the Yugoslav league.

In the first season of the Croatian league, Zamet played in the 1.B HRL, won the league, and got promoted to the 1.A HRL the same season. In their first season in the 1.A HRL, the club finished in third place and qualified for the EHF City Cup, which was their first appearance in a European competition. The club was then led by Slavko Bralić.

From 2002 to 2004, the club was called Croatia Osiguranje Zamet due to sponsorship.

The club's best successes were the two cup finals (in 2014 and 2016) and the second place in the league in 2015, in the season in which they fought for the title with Podravka, with a generation which they led by Ćamila Mičijević and Dejana Milosavljević, which they later made the respectable career and won the bronze medal at the 2020 European Women's Handball Championship with national team.

== Venue ==
Since the foundation of the club, matches were played on the playground Zamet when field handball was played.

As of 2009, the club has been playing in Centar Zamet. The capacity of the venue is 2,350 spectators.

== Seasons ==
Since the beginning of Croatian handball in 1992, Zamet has competed at the highest level except for four seasons when they were in the second tier.

Season	Tier	Division	Pos.
1991–92	2	First B League	1st ↑
1992–93	1	First A League	3rd
1993–94	1	First A League	3rd
1994–95	1	First A League	7th
1995–96	1	First A League	12th ↓
1996–97	2	First B League	1st ↑
1997–98	1	First A League	7th
1998–99	1	First A League	5th
1999–00	1	First A League	9th
2000–01	1	First A League	7th
2001–02	1	First League	8th
2002–03	1	First League	8th
2003–04	1	First League	8th
2004–05	1	First League	6th

Season	Tier	Division	Pos.
2005–06	1	First League	5th
2006–07	1	First League	10th
2007–08	1	First League	8th
2008–09	1	First League	7th
2009–10	1	First League	5th
2010–11	1	First League	5th
2011–12	1	First League	7th
2012–13	1	First League	7th
2013–14	1	First League	6th
2014–15	1	First League	2nd
2015–16	1	First League	4th
2016–17	1	First League	4th
2017–18	1	First League	7th
2018–19	1	First League	13th ↓

Season	Tier	Division	Pos.
2019–20	2	Second League	N/A^{1}
2020–21	2	Second League	2nd
2021–22	2	Second League	1st ↑
2022–23	1	First League	12th
2023–24	1	First League	10th

^{1} The season was voided due to COVID-19 pandemic.

== Team ==
=== Current squad ===
Squad for the 2020-21 season

* Blažić Irina
* Đuzel Allsu
* Hodžić Adela
* Hren Patricia
* Krivičić Tea
* Mikolić Katja
* Milošević Laura
* Mršić Elena
* Nikolić Noel
* Perčić Bahtiri Nayana
* Pleša Nikolina
* Pleše Nika

* Polić Lea
* Ramić Mihaela
* Rončević Iva
* Sabalić Veronika
* Skokandić Katia
* Stanić Iva
* Tabar Iva
* Toskić Ella
* Troskot Stefanie
* Visković Maja

=== Technical staff ===
- President: (Croatia) Iva Lesjak
- Head coach: (Croatia) Josip Štokić
- Assistant, GK Coach: (Croatia) Željko Vujmilović, Željko Radanović
- Sport director: (Croatia) Goran Stašek,
- Second Team Coach: (Croatia) Filip Grbčić
- Youth Academy Coaches: (Croatia) Luka Pejatović, (Croatia) Đoni Skokandić, (Croatia) Kristina Plahinek, (Croatia) Stefanie Troskot, (Croatia) Marijana Kovačević,

Source: zrk-zamet.hrSource: rukometstat.hr

== Notable former players ==
- (Socialist Federal Republic of Yugoslavia) Marija Malik
- (Socialist Federal Republic of Yugoslavia) Ida Crljenica
- (Socialist Federal Republic of Yugoslavia) Zlata Fazlić
- (Socialist Federal Republic of Yugoslavia) Željka Maras
- (Socialist Federal Republic of Yugoslavia) Tea Morsi
- (Socialist Federal Republic of Yugoslavia) Nada Rukavina
- (Socialist Federal Republic of Yugoslavia) Gordana Čorak
- (Socialist Federal Republic of Yugoslavia) Branka Zuber
- (Socialist Federal Republic of Yugoslavia) Jadranka Mijolović
- (Socialist Federal Republic of Yugoslavia) Branka Strišković
- (Socialist Federal Republic of Yugoslavia) Suzana Gustin
- (Croatia) Ljerka Krajnović
- (Croatia) Rada Ciganović
- (Croatia) Gordana Možnik
- (Croatia) Jasenka Pilepić
- (Croatia) Višnja Hrmić
- (Croatia) Sanja Bobanović
- (Croatia) Irena Pahor
- (Croatia) Sandra Stojković
- (Croatia) Ella Bukvić
- (Croatia) Anamarija Gugić
- (Croatia) Tea Bunić
- (Croatia) Dina Havić
- (Croatia) Katarina Ježić
- (Croatia) Ćamila Mičijević
- (Croatia) Ana Debelić
- (Croatia) Kristina Plahinek
- (Croatia) Selena Milošević
- (Croatia) Dejana Milosavljević

== Coaches ==
- (Socialist Federal Republic of Yugoslavia) Stanko Jerger (1957-1968)
- (Socialist Federal Republic of Yugoslavia) Stanko Jerger & Simeon Kosanović (1968-1969)
- (Socialist Federal Republic of Yugoslavia) Simeon Kosanović (1969-1975)
- (Socialist Federal Republic of Yugoslavia) Branimir Čutić (1975-1981)
- (Socialist Federal Republic of Yugoslavia) Andrija Barin (1981)
- (Socialist Federal Republic of Yugoslavia) Josip Božić (1982)
- (Socialist Federal Republic of Yugoslavia) Marijan Seđak (1982-1985)
- (Socialist Federal Republic of Yugoslavia) Sandro Bogojević (1985-1986)
- (Socialist Federal Republic of Yugoslavia) Edo Šmit (1986-1988)
- (Socialist Federal Republic of Yugoslavia) Vjekoslav Sardelić (1988-1990)
- (Socialist Federal Republic of Yugoslavia) Damir Čavlović (1991)
- (Croatia) Zdravko Štingl (1991-1992)
- (Croatia) Slavko Bralić (1992-1994)
- (Croatia) Edo Šmit (1994)
- (Croatia) Mladenko Mišković (1995)
- (Croatia) Edo Šmit (1995-1999)
- (Croatia) Branimir Čutić (1999-2001)
- (Croatia) Darko Dunato (2001-2002)
- (Croatia) Boris Dragičević (2002-2005)
- (Croatia) Damir Čavlović (2005-2007)
- (Croatia) Rada Ciganović (2007-2008)
- (Croatia) Edo Šmit (2008-2011)
- (Croatia) Drago Žiljak (17 July 2011- 28 August 2012)
- (Croatia) Željko Čagalj (28 August 2012 - 28 April 2013)
- (Croatia) Adriana Prosenjak (13 May 2013 – 13 March 2019)
- (Croatia) Igor Marijanović (15 April 2019 - 28 August 2020 )
- (Croatia) Drago Žiljak (1 September 2020 - 19 january 2023)
- (Croatia) Josip Štokić (20 january 2023 - present)

== Presidents ==
- 1957–1968 - Vittorio Drog☨ (Socialist Federal Republic of Yugoslavia)
- 1968–1977 - Stanko Jerger (Socialist Federal Republic of Yugoslavia)
- 1977–1979 - Ivan Brnabić (Socialist Federal Republic of Yugoslavia)
- 1979–1980 - Fedor Pirović (Socialist Federal Republic of Yugoslavia)
- 1980–1983 - Drago Crnčević (Socialist Federal Republic of Yugoslavia)
- 1983–1985 - Petar Čarić (Socialist Federal Republic of Yugoslavia)
- 1985–1991 - Ranko Dujmović (Socialist Federal Republic of Yugoslavia)
- 1991-1994 - Srđan Čevizović (Slovenia)
- 1994-1999 - Ranko Dujmović (Croatia)
- 1999–2019 - Luka Denona (Croatia)
- 2019 - present - Iva Lesjak (Croatia)

== Honours ==
=== Croatia ===
- 1. HRL
  - Runner-up (1): 2014–15
- 1.B HRL
  - Winners (2): 1991–92, 1996–97
- 2. HRL
  - Winners (1): 2021–22
- Croatian Cup
  - Finalist (2): 2014, 2016

=== Yugoslavia ===
- Yugoslav Second League (North)
  - Winners (1): 1977–78
- Regional league of Primorje and Istra
  - Winners (3): 1967–68, 1968–69, 1969–70
- Rijeka League
  - Winners (4): 1957–58, 1958–59, 1961–62, 1963–64

== European record ==
Season	Competition	Round	Club	1st leg	2nd leg	Aggregate
1993–94	EHF City Cup	1/8	(Belgium) Fémina Visé	28–20	18–11	46–36
1993–94	EHF City Cup	QF	(Hungary) Szegedi ESK	24–20	18–22	42–42
2015–16	EHF Cup	R2	(Luxembourg) HB Dudelange	39–16	35–18	74–34
2015–16	EHF Cup	R3	(Denmark) Odense Håndbold	23–28	21–30	44–58

== Rankings ==
=== EHF club coefficient ranking ===
(As of 24 September 2020), source: Eurotopteam website

Rank	Team	Points
224	(Turkey) Polatli Belediyespor	7
225	(Romania) CSM Slatina	7
226	(Croatia) ZAMET RIJEKA	7
227	(Bosnia and Herzegovina) ZRK Zrinjski Mostar	7
228	(Spain) BM Mar Sagunto	6

== Related clubs ==
- RK Zamet

== Sources ==
- Petar Orgulić - 50 godina rukometa u Rijeci (2005), Adria public
