= Adriana Prosenjak =

Yugoslav handball player (born 1963)

Personal information
- Nationality: Croatian
- Born: 12 July 1963 (age 63) Labin, SR Croatia, SFR Yugoslavia

Sport
- Sport: Handball
- Position: Goalkeeper
National team
Years	Team	Apps	(Gls)
2001–2012	Croatia	45	(0)
Medal record
Women's handball
Representing Croatia
Mediterranean Games
Gold medal – first place	1993 France

Adriana Prosenjak (born 12 July 1963) is a Croatian former handball coach and player.

Prosenjak is considered a legendary player and is celebrated in Croatian handball. For instance, she was the goalkeeper and the first captain of the Croatia women's national handball team. In addition, Prosenjak was named the best handball player in Croatia in 1993.

== Biography ==
She was born on July 7, 1963, in Labin, Istria. She started playing at 10 for her hometown club ŽRK Rudar Labin, and went through all the selections at the Istrian club. With Labin's first team, she managed to get promoted to the Yugoslav First League.

After playing for the swans, she moved to ŽRK Lokomotiva Zagreb. At Lokomotiva she won the EHF European League and the last Yugoslav Championship before the dissolution of the country. She spent 11 years at Lokomotiva, where she also won a Croatian Championship and a Croatian Cup in 1992. She then moved to Sweden and Austria and ended her career at ŽRK Đurđevac, where she started her coaching career.

After Đurđevac, she coached Varaždin, Salerno, Pula, Umag, and, from 2013 to 2019, ŽRK Zamet, winning two Croatian Cups and finishing second in the 2014–15 1 HRL. In 2020, she came back to her hometown Labin, to coach the local Labin School of Handball.

She also played for Croatia, of which she was the captain ever since the national team's first international appearance. She took part with Croatia in two World Championships and two European championships. She won the 1993 Mediterranean Games with Croatia. She played a total of 45 games for Croatia's national team.
