= MRK Rudar Labin =

Men's handball club from Labin, Istria County in Croatia

- Full name: Muški rukometni klub Rudar
- Founded: 1954
- Dissolved: 2000

Muški rukometni klub Rudar (MRK Rudar; Rudar; Rudar Labin) was a men's handball club from Labin, Istria County.

== History ==
The club was founded as the Handball Section of DTO "Partizan" in March 1954. The women's team was formed in the fall of 1955. It started competing in the Istrian Sub-Federal League in the spring of 1955, and played as "Partizan Podlabin". In the seasons 1958/59 and 1959/60 "Partizan" played in the Primorsko-Istarska regional league. In the 1960/61 season it did not perform, and in the 1961/62 season and 1962/63 they played in the Istarskoj zonskoj ligi, and in the 1963/64 season in the Inter-municipal league Pazin-Rovinj-Pula-Labin.

In 1964, it became RK "Rudar". From the 1964/65 season to 1966/67 they played in the Istrian Regional League, and starting from 1967/68 in the Primorsko-Istarska regional league, where they played until the 1973/74 season. In 1974 they won the championship and thus were placed in the United Croatian League, which they won right away in the 1974/75 season, to be then placed in the Second Federal League - North, in which they played until the 1978/79 season.

In 1978, a sports hall was opened at the "Mate Blažina" High School Center. Previously, "Rudar" performed on the slag playground of the Mining and Industrial School and the "Ivo Lola Ribar" Elementary School from 1955, and from 1966 they were given an asphalt playground.

From the 1979/80 season they were members of the Croatian Regional League - West. They won that league in the 1980/81 season, but failed to qualify for the Inter-Republican League. Due to the reorganization of league competitions, the league was renamed Primorje-Istrian Regional League. In the 1984/85 season they played in the Croatian Republic League - West, but were immediately relegated to the Primorsko-Istarska Regional League, which they won in 1986/87, but failed to qualify for the Croatian League. In the 1990/91 season they were the champions of the Istrian League.

Due to the Croatian War of Independence, the championship competitions were postponed to the spring of 1992. "Rudar" played in the Primorsko-Istarska regional league, winning third place. In the season 1992/93 they played in the 1st B HRL - South, which they won, entering the 1.A HRL for the 1993/94 season.

Men's and women's clubs were separated in the nomenclature, and so the men's club became MRK "Rudar". In the 1993/94 season Rudar, under the name Jadranka Big Net Rudar, won only the 11th place, dropping out of 1.A HRL. From the 1994/95 season to the 1998/99 season, Rudar played in the 1.B HRL - South, and in 1999/2000 in the unique 1st HRL which they won under the name Plomin Linija Rudar. In the season 2000/01 they won 11th place in the 1.A HRL, but at the end of the season the club ran into financial difficulties. The club was then briefly called RK Istra, but gave up the 1.A HRL for the 2001/02 season, shutting down. "Mladi Rudar", which was previously established as a handball school for MRK Rudar (youth system), took men's handball over in Labin, and later became an independent club. They took over the youth teams and part of the seniors from MRK Rudar.

== Honours ==
- Croatian Republic Championship

Champions: 1974/75

- Croatian Republic League

Champions: 1974/75

- 1.B HRL
- Champions (2): 1992/93 (South), 1999/2000

== Sources ==
- Trišović, Milenko (2010). Razvoj rukometa u Istri : 1953. – 2008 [Development of handball in Istria: 1953 -2008] (in Croatian). Pula: Handball Association of Istria County. ISBN 978-953-56366-0-1.
- Gruičić, Jasmina; et al. (2005). 50 godina rukometa na Labinštini [50 years of handball in the Labin region] (in Croatian). Labin. ISBN 953-7294-08-0.
- Flander, Marijan; et al. (1986). Razvoj rukometa u Hrvatskoj : od prvih početaka do 1985. godine [Development of handball in Croatia: from the first beginnings to 1985] (in Croatian). Zagreb: Croatian Handball Association. pp. 152–153.

== See also ==
- RK Mladi Rudar Labin
- ŽRK Rudar Labin
