= Renato Percan =

Istrian painter (1936-2013)

- Born: 29 October 1936; Trget, near Labin, Kingdom of Italy
- Died: 21 October 2013 (aged 76); Pula, Croatia
- Resting place: Nedešćina, Croatia
- Education: Zagreb Academy of Fine Arts
- Occupation: Painter
- Movement: Modernism, symbolism, art Nouveau
- Awards: Order of Danica Hrvatska

Renato Percan (29 October 1936 – 21 October 2013) was an Istrian painter. Percan was part of the Labin-based group Labinski atelieri, which included, among others, Orlando Mohorović. Percan was awarded the Order of Danica Hrvatska with the effigy of Marko Marulić in 1996 for his contributions to culture. Percan was a member of the Croatian Society of Fine Arts.

He was born in Trget, near Labin, Istria. He graduated from the Academy of Fine Arts of Zagreb in 1966. Percan was in the class of professor Albert Kinert. Percan's works have been described as "full of energy and eroticism." His death did not leave a strong echo in the Croatian public.
