= Presika =

Presika may refer to:

- Presika, Slovenia, a village in Slovenia
- Presika, Primorje-Gorski Kotar County, a village in Croatia
- Presika, Istria County, a village in Croatia
