= Kapelica =

Kapelica refers to the following places in Croatia:

- Kapelica, Istria County
- Kapelica, Bjelovar-Bilogora County
