= ŽRK Rudar Labin =

- Full name: Ženski rukometni klub Rudar Labin
- Nickname(s): Swans
- Short name: Rudar
- Founded: 1954
- Arena: Franko Mileta Sports Center
- Capacity: 1,100
- President: Igor Miletić
- League: 2. HRL WEST
- Club colours
Home	Away

ŽRK Rudar Labin is a Croatian women's handball club based in Labin. It was established in 1954. It plays in the 2. HRL West. Several notable players from the club went on the play for the national team, both Croatia's and Yugoslavia's.

The players are nicknamed the swans.

== History ==
In 1964 the club reached for the first time the playoffs to the first Yugoslav league. In 1966, Rudar reached the playoffs again, but was eliminated by Rijeka's Zamet. In 1974 they reached the finals of the Croatian Cup, eliminating Zagreb's Lokomotiva. In 1976, the youth team won the Croatian championship. The first team won the title of second league champions in 1976/77, won the qualifications in Belgrade and thus reached Yugoslavia's first league. This is the greatest success for Labin in handball, and one of Istria's greatest achievements in sports.

In the 1981/82 season they won the Yugoslavian second league, losing only one game when they were already qualified, and thus were promoted to the first league. In the 1982/83 season they finished 7th in Yugoslavia's first league, although they were fourth for most of the season.

== Sporting achievements ==
=== Domestic competitions ===
Yugoslav first league

- 7th place: 1982/83

Yugoslav second league

- Winners (2): 1976/77, 1981/82

Yugoslav Championship (U-20)

- Winners (3): 1976, 1977, 1982
- 3rd place: 1975

Yugoslav Cup (U-20)

- Quarter-finals: 1975

Croatian Championship (U-20)

- Winners (4): 1975, 1976

Croatian Cup (U-20)

- Runners-up: 1976

=== International competitions ===
Adriatic Cup (U-20)

- Winners (2): 1973, 1974
- Runners-up (2): 1975

== Notable former players ==
Notable former players of the club include the following.

- Doris Belušić
- Lorena Beučić
- Ivona Bućan
- Denis Čalović
- Evelina Galo
- Suzana Golja
- Čeda Hrvatin
- Sabina Ibrahimović
- Maja Jusić
- Tamara Klapčić
- Žana Kljajić
- Karmen Kokot
- Tea Linić
- Sara Mileta
- Hermina Mrkaljević
- Loredana Paliska
- Ornela Paliska
- Adriana Prosenjak
- Gordana Salopek
- Suzana Špoljarić
- Virna Šumberac
- Eni Šverko
- Ksenija Vozila
- Ingrid Zulijani

== See also ==
- RK Rudar Labin
- MRK Rudar Labin
