= Croatian First League (women's handball) =

- Founded: 1991
- No. of teams: 14
- Country: Croatia
- Confederation: EHF
- Most recent champion: Podravka (29th title)
- Most titles: Podravka (29 titles)
- Broadcaster: Sportska TV
- Level on pyramid: 1
- Relegation to: 2. HRLŽ
- International cups: Champions League; European League; European Cup
- Website: http://www.hrs.hr/
- 2026–27 season

The Croatian Women's First Handball League (Croatian: Prva hrvatska rukometna liga za žene) is the top women's handball league in Croatia. It is organized by the Croatian Handball Federation. The league comprises fourteen teams.

== Current teams ==
Locations of teams in 2026–27 Croatian First League

As of 2026–27 season

- 1234 Virovitica - Virovitica
- Bjelovar - Bjelovar
- Dalmatinka - Ploče
- Ivanić - Ivanić Grad
- Koka - Varaždin
- Lokomotiva - Zagreb
- Marina Kaštela - Kaštela
- Osijek - Osijek
- Podravka - Koprivnica
- Rudar - Labin
- Sinj - Sinj
- Split 2010 - Split
- Zamet - Rijeka
- Zrinski - Čakovec

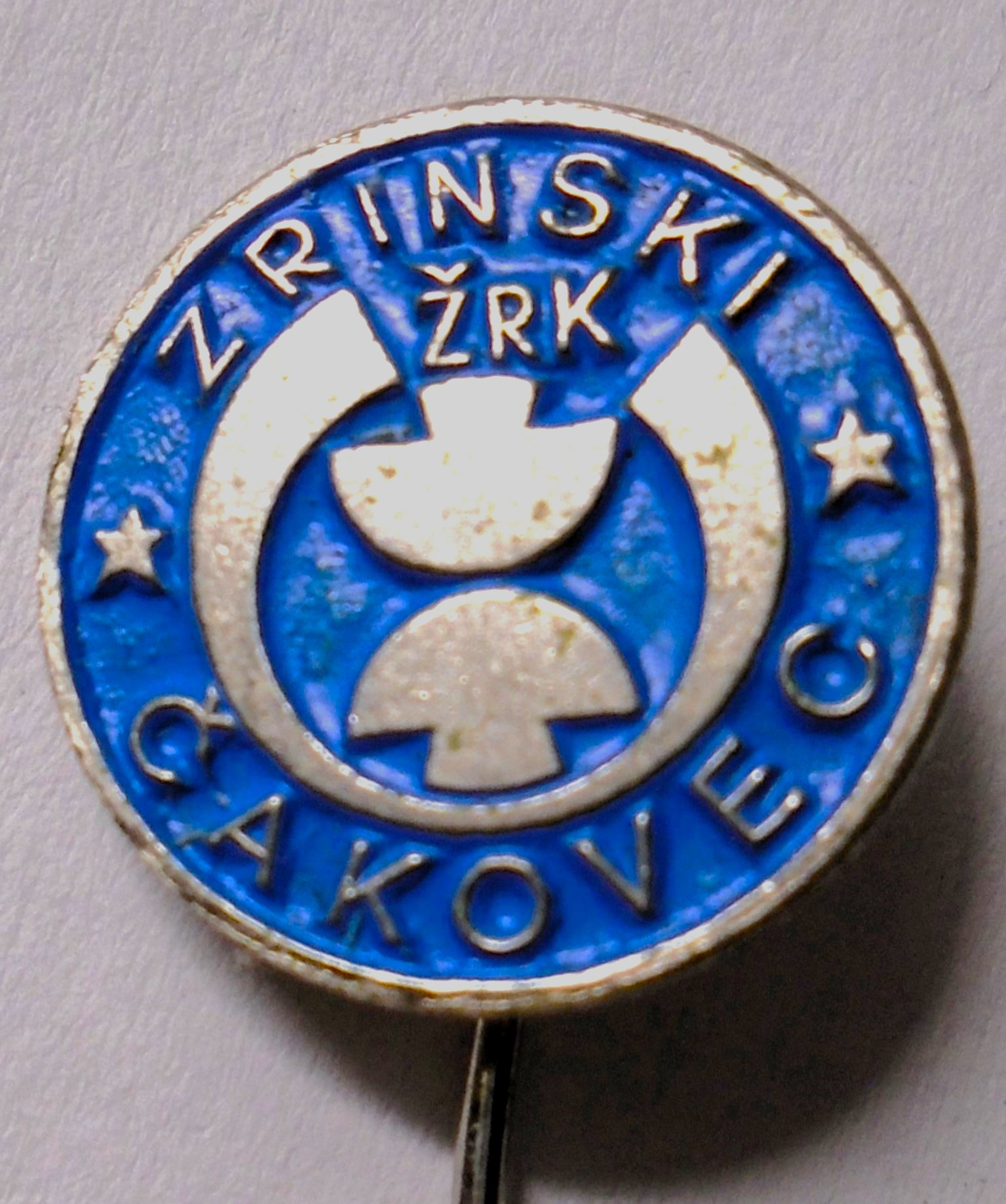
Former pin badge of the ŽRK Zrinski, women's handball club from Čakovec

== EHF league ranking ==
EHF League Ranking for 2022/23 season:

- 6. (4) (Romania) Liga Națională (94.50)
- 7. (7) (Montenegro) Prva Liga (61.33)
- 8. (9) (Croatia) 1. HRL (57.00)
- 9. (8) (Germany) Handball Bundesliga Frauen (56.33)
- 10. (11) (Slovenia) 1. A DRL

== List of champions ==
Key

†	League champions also won the Croatian Women's Handball Cup, i.e. they completed the domestic Double.

Season	Champions	Runners-up	Third Place
1992	Lokomotiva Zagreb (1) †	Split	Podravka Koprivnica
1992–93	Podravka Koprivnica (1) †	Lokomotiva Zagreb	Zamet
1993–94	Podravka Koprivnica (2) †	Lokomotiva Zagreb	Graničar Đurđevac; Zamet
1994–95	Podravka Koprivnica (3) †	Kraš Zagreb	Graničar Đurđevac; Karbon Zaprešić
1995–96	Podravka Vegeta (4) †	Graničar Đurđevac	Kraš Zagreb
1996–97	Podravka Dolcela (5) †	Kraš Zagreb	Graničar Đurđevac
1997–98	Podravka Dolcela (6) †	Kraš Zagreb	Osijek
1998–99	Podravka Dolcela (7) †	Kraš Zagreb	Osijek; Split Kaltenberg
1999–2000	Podravka Dolcela (8) †	Osijek	Kraš Zagreb
2000–01	Podravka Vegeta (9) †	Split Kaltenberg	Osijek; Zvečevo Požega
2001–02	Podravka Vegeta (10) †	Lokomotiva Zagreb	Koka Varaždin; Sonic Osijek
2002–03	Podravka Vegeta (11) †	Lokomotiva Zagreb	Sonic Osijek
2003–04	Lokomotiva Zagreb (2)	Podravka Vegeta	Brodosplit Inženjering
2004–05	Podravka Vegeta (12)	TVIN Virovitica	Lokomotiva Zagreb
2005–06	Podravka Vegeta (13) †	Lokomotiva Zagreb	TVIN Virovitica
2006–07	Podravka Vegeta (14)	Lokomotiva Zagreb	Trogir
2007–08	Podravka Vegeta (15) †	Lokomotiva Zagreb	Trešnjevka
2008–09	Podravka Vegeta (16) †	Lokomotiva Zagreb	Trogir
2009–10	Podravka Vegeta (17) †	Lokomotiva Zagreb	Arena Pula
2010–11	Podravka Vegeta (18) †	Trešnjevka	Lokomotiva Zagreb
2011–12	Podravka Vegeta (19) †	Lokomotiva Zagreb	Sesvete Agroproteinka
2012–13	Podravka Vegeta (20) †	Lokomotiva Zagreb	Fantasyland Samobor
2013–14	Lokomotiva Zagreb (3) †	Podravka Vegeta	Trešnjevka
2014–15	Podravka Vegeta (21) †	Zamet	Zelina
2015–16	Podravka Vegeta (22) †	Lokomotiva Zagreb	Sesvete Agroproteinka
2016–17	Podravka Vegeta (23) †	Lokomotiva Zagreb	Koka Varaždin
2017–18	Podravka Vegeta (24)	Lokomotiva Zagreb	Koka Varaždin
2018–19	Podravka Vegeta (25) †	Lokomotiva Zagreb	Bjelovar
2019–20	Abandoned due to the COVID-19 pandemic		
2020–21	Podravka Vegeta (26)	Lokomotiva Zagreb	Umag
2021–22	Lokomotiva Zagreb (4)	Podravka Vegeta	Bjelovar
2022–23	Lokomotiva Zagreb (5)	Podravka Vegeta	Bjelovar
2023–24	Podravka Vegeta (27) †	Lokomotiva Zagreb	Zrinski Čakovec
2024–25	Podravka Vegeta (28) †	Lokomotiva Zagreb	Dalmatinka Ploče
2025–26	Podravka Koprivnica (29) †	Lokomotiva Zagreb	Zrinski Čakovec

== Performance by club ==
Teams in bold compete in the First League as of the 2026–27 season.

Club	Winners	Runners-up	Winning years
**Podravka Koprivnica**	29	4	1993, 1994, 1995, 1996, 1997, 1998, 1999, 2000, 2001, 2002, 2003, 2005, 2006, 2007, 2008, 2009, 2010, 2011, 2012, 2013, 2015, 2016, 2017, 2018, 2019, 2021, 2024, 2025, 2026
**Lokomotiva Zagreb**	5	23	1992, 2004, 2014, 2022, 2023
Split	–	2	
Đurđevac	–	1	
**Osijek**	–	1	
Trešnjevka	–	1	
**Virotivica**	–	1	
**Zamet**	–	1	

== See also ==
- Croatian Premier Handball League
