= Giuseppina Martinuzzi =

Italian pedagogue and feminist

- Born: 14 February 1844; Albona, Austrian Empire
- Died: 25 November 1925 (aged 81); Albona, Kingdom of Italy
- Occupations: Teacher, journalist, political activist
- Known for: Socialist and feminist activism
- Office: Member of the Trieste municipal council
- Political party: Italian Socialist Party; Communist Party of Italy
- Parent(s): Giovanni Pietro Martinuzzi; Antonia Luis

Giuseppina Martinuzzi (Albona, 14 February 1844 – Albona, 25 November 1925) was an Italian pedagogue, journalist, socialist, and feminist.

== Biography ==
=== Personal life ===
Martinuzzi was born in Labin to Antonia Luis and Giovanni Pietro Martinuzzi (mayor of Labin); she was the eldest of three children. She qualified as a teacher in 1875.

She lived a long time in Trieste, where she taught in the poor neighbourhoods of the city, helping with the integration of the Slovenians and fighting against narrow nationalistic municipalism. In 1904 she was elected to Trieste municipal council.

She joined the Communist Party of Italy in 1921 and soon founded, and became the political secretary of, the Women's Communist Group of Trieste. She was a leading light in the Women's Socialist Circle and wrote numerous political tracts for the emancipation of women. In her last prose work, Fra italiani e slavi, she expresses her ideal of pacifism and ethnic integration.

A primary school is named after her in Pula.

== Works ==
- Manuale mnemonico, Trieste, 1886
- I semprevivi. In memoria de' miei cari ed amati genitori Giovanni ed Antonia Martinuzzi, Rovereto 1896
- Nelle caverne di S. Canziano, Udine, 1897
- Albona. 20 genn. 1599 – 20 genn. 1899, Trieste, 1899
- Semprevivi, 1896
- Libertà e schiavitù, Trieste, 1899
- Patria e socialismo, Trieste, 1899
- Among the irredents, 1899
- Presente e avvenire, Firenze, 1900
- Edmondo De Amicis e la questione sociale, Trieste, 1900
- The national struggle in Istria considered as an obstacle to socialism, 1900
- Ingiustizia, Trieste, 1907
- Nazionalismo morboso e internazionalismo affarista, Trieste, 1911
- Maternità dolorosa, Trieste, 1911
- Invito alla luce, Trieste, 1912
- Ai giovani socialisti, Trieste, 1912
- Amilcare Cipriani, Trieste, 1913
- Fra italiani e slavi, 1914
- Socijalizam i Domovina

- Reading Book for Public Schools (co-author)
- Pro Patria magazine, 1888 (publisher)
- Pro Patria Nostra magazine, 1889 (publisher)
