= Ripenda Kosi =

Ripenda Kosi Ripenda Cossi
- Village
- Location within Croatia
- Coordinates: 45°06′22″N 14°10′05″E
- Country: Croatia
- County: Istria County
- Municipality: Labin

Area
  - Total: 2.9 sq mi (7.4 km^{2})
- Elevation: 771 ft (235 m)

Population (2021)
  - Total: 11
  - Density: 3.8/sq mi (1.5/km^{2})
- Time zone: UTC+1 (CET)
  - Summer (DST): UTC+2 (CEST)
- Postal code: 52220 Labin
- Area code: 052

Ripenda Kosi (Italian: Ripenda Cossi) is a small village in the Labin-Albona municipality in Istria County, Croatia

== Demographics ==
According to the 2021 census, its population was 11. It was 12 in 2011.
