= Kranjci, Istria County =

Kranjci Crainzi
- Village
- Location within Croatia
- Coordinates: 45°04′01″N 14°06′43″E
- Country: Croatia
- County: Istria County
- Municipality: Labin

Area
  - Total: 1.0 sq mi (2.6 km^{2})

Population (2021)
  - Total: 98
  - Density: 98/sq mi (38/km^{2})
- Time zone: UTC+1 (CET)
  - Summer (DST): UTC+2 (CEST)
- Postal code: 52220 Labin
- Area code: 052

Kranjci (Italian: Crainzi) is a village in the Labin-Albona municipality in Istria County, Croatia.

== Demographics ==
According to the 2021 census, its population was 98. It was 95 in 2011.
