= Kristina Plahinek =

Croatian handball player (born 1992)

Personal information
- Nationality: Croatian
- Born: 18 December 1992 (age 33) Rijeka, Croatia
- Height: 1.64 m (5 ft 5 in)

Sport
- Sport: Handball
- Position: Left wing
- Current club: ŽRK Zamet

Senior clubs
- Years: Team
- RK Omišalj
- –2017: ŽRK Zamet
- 2017–2019: RK Lokomotiva Zagreb
- 2019–2021: ŽRK Umag
- 2021–2022: Maccabi Rishon LeZion
- 2022–: ŽRK Zamet
National team
| Years | Team | Apps | (Gls) |
| – | Croatia | 15 | (21) |

Kristina Plahinek (born 18 December 1992) is a Croatian handball player for ŽRK Zamet and the Croatian national team.

She participated at the 2018 European Women's Handball Championship.

== International honours ==
- EHF Challenge Cup:
  - Semifinalst: 2018
