= Polytechnic of Rijeka =

Polytechnic of Rijeka Veleučilište u Rijeci Collegium Fluminensis
- Type: Public
- Established: 1998
- Dean: Dušan Rudić
- Location: Rijeka, Croatia
- Website: www.veleri.hr

Polytechnic of Rijeka (Croatian: Veleučilište u Rijeci) is one of the largest polytechnic institutions in Croatia with departments in: Rijeka, Poreč, Pazin, Pula, Otočac, Gospić and Ogulin. It was founded in 1998.

== Sections ==
Business section

- professional study computer science
- professional study of entrepreneurship
- Specialist Professional Graduate Study of Information Science and Technology in Business Systems
- Specialist Professional Graduate Study of Entrepreneurship

Transport Department

- Professional Study of Road Transport
- Professional Study of Railroad Transport
- Professional Study of Postal Services
- Specialist Professional Graduate Study of Traport.

Occupational Safety Department

- Professional Study of Occupational Safety
- Specialist Professional Graduate Study of Occupational Safety.

Agricultural Department

- Professional Study of Winemaking
- Professional Study of Mediterranean Agriculture
- Specialist Professional Graduate Study of Winemaking.

Department of Telematics

== Notable alumni ==
- Nansi Tireli, Croatian politician
