= Gondolići =

Gondolići Gondali
- Village
- Location within Croatia
- Coordinates: 45°04′23″N 14°08′02″E
- Country: Croatia
- County: Istria
- Municipality: Labin

Area
  - Total: 4.9 km^{2} (1.9 sq mi)
- Elevation: 270 m (890 ft)

Population (2021)
  - Total: 81
  - Density: 17/km^{2} (43/sq mi)
- Time zone: UTC+1 (CET)
  - Summer (DST): UTC+2 (CEST)

Gondolići (Italian: Gondali) is a village in the Labin-Albona municipality in Istria County, Croatia. It is situated on the Labinština peninsula in Istria.

== Demographics ==
According to the 2021 census, its population was 81. It was 74 in 2011.
