= Gora Glušići =

Gora Glušići Glussici
- Village
- Location within Croatia
- Coordinates: 45°02′02″N 14°05′46″E
- Country: Croatia
- County: Istria
- Municipality: Labin

Area
  - Total: 11.0 km^{2} (4.2 sq mi)
- Elevation: 440 m (1,440 ft)

Population (2021)
  - Total: 37
  - Density: 3.4/km^{2} (8.7/sq mi)
- Time zone: UTC+1 (CET)
  - Summer (DST): UTC+2 (CEST)

Gora Glušići (Italian: Glussici) is a village in the Labin-Albona municipality in Istria County, Croatia.

== Demographics ==
According to the 2021 census, its population was 37. It was 30 in 2011.
