= RK Mladi Rudar Labin =

- Full name: Rukometni klub Mladi Rudar Labin
- Short name: RK Rudar Labin
- Founded: 2000
- Arena: Franko Mileta Sport Club
- Capacity: 1,100

Rukometni klub Mladi Rudar Labin (formerly RK Rudan Labin) is a men's handball club from Labin, Istria County.

== History ==
The club was founded on October 23, 2000, under the name Handball Association "Mladi Rudar" (youth team), as a handball organization for the education and development of young handball players for the needs of the MRK Rudar Labin, which in the 2000/01 season competed in the 1st A HRL. However, "Rudar" got into financial problems, and they were called "RK Istra" for a short time. They gave up the 1.A HRL for the 2001/02 season, and the club shut down. Mladi Rudar took over "Rudar's" younger players and part of the remaining seniors, forming the senior team with which it played in the 2001/02 season, in the 3rd HRL - West 2, which the club won, entering the 2nd HRL - West, in which he played until the 2009/10 season, when it entered the 1st HRL, where the club played for the 2010/11 and 2011/12 seasons, whereafter it was again relegated to the 2nd HRL - West, where it played until the 2015/16 season, when it entered the 1st HRL - South, which was won by the club in the 2017/18 season, becoming a member of the Premier League. The Croatian league is considered the 8th top handball championship in the world. It once was in the top 5.

The club has a reserve (B) team, that competes in the 3rd HRL - West.

On August 30, 2018, at the assembly of the club, a decision was made to rename the club to "RK" Rudar Labin ".

== Honours ==
- 1. HRL - Jug: 2017./2018

== See also ==
- MRK Rudar Labin
- ŽRK Rudar Labin
