= Ripenda Verbanci =

Ripenda Verbanci Ripenda Verbanzi
- Village
- Location within Croatia
- Coordinates: 45°06′36″N 14°08′38″E
- Country: Croatia
- County: Istria County
- Municipality: Labin

Area
  - Total: 1.9 sq mi (4.9 km^{2})
- Elevation: 869 ft (265 m)

Population (2021)
  - Total: 99
  - Density: 52/sq mi (20/km^{2})
- Time zone: UTC+1 (CET)
  - Summer (DST): UTC+2 (CEST)
- Postal code: 52220 Labin
- Area code: 052

Ripenda Verbanci (Italian: Ripenda Verbanzi) is a village in the Labin-Albona municipality in Istria County, Croatia.

== Demographics ==
According to the 2021 census, its population was 99. It was 86 in 2011.
