= Suzana Golja =

Croatian handball player

Personal information
- Nationality: Croatian
- Born: Labin, SR Croatia, SFR Yugoslavia

Sport
- Sport: Handball

Youth career
- Years: Team
- –: ŽRK Rudar Labin

Senior clubs
- Years: Team
- –: Junkeren
National team
- Years: Team
- –: Croatia

Suzana Golja (Golja-Zulijani) is a Croatian former handball player.

She was born in Labin, Istria (today Croatia, at the time SR Croatia in SFR Yugoslavia). Golja started playing with local club ŽRK Rudar Labin.

She played for Norwegian club Junkeren in the Eliteserien in the 1990s.

Golja was a player of the Croatian national handball team.
