= Baldo Lupetino =

Venetian Franciscan friar

Baldo Lupetino (also Lupatino and Baldo d'Albona) (1502 – 1556) was an Istrian Italian Venetian Protestant preacher.

== Biography ==
He was born in Albona (now Labin), in Istria. Lupetino's family belonged to the local old patriciate, and was related by marriage to the Luciani family. There is a Slavicized, modern Croatian form of his surname, Lupatina. This form does not appear in contemporary sources from the 16th century.

His sister Giovanna married Luciano Luciani, the brother of Jacobea Luciani, mother of Matthias Flacius Illyricus.

He entered the Franciscan order in his hometown, and was ordained a priest. He entered the convent when he was but 14 years old, being immediately noted by his ability to preach in both Italian and Chakavian. By the end of the 1530s he had probably already embraced the Reformation, based on the fact that he urged Flacius to go study in Germany instead of Venice. At this time, Baldo reportedly introduced Flacius to the Reformation movement. In the 1530s he got into contact with the Barbo brothers, who were related to the Patrizi from Cres (Cherso). Thereafter, Baldo went to preach in Cres several times, since as early as 1535, invited by the council of the island, wherein Stefano Patrizi held a prominent position.

Although he had found support on the island, even that of some of its prominent citizens, Baldo found an obstacle in Giacomo Curzolan, a Venetian chancellor, who denounced him to the Venetian authorities in October 1541, after he heard him deny several points of the Catholic dogma in his sermon for Lent. On 4 November 1542 Baldo was incarcerated and brought to Venice. On 26 June 1543 Flacius went from Wittenberg to Venice to present a letter signed by the leaders of the Schmalkaldic League to the Venetian authorities, on the behalf of his uncle-in-law. However, Baldo was condemned to life imprisonment and a fine of 100 ducats.

While in prison, he "kept on manifesting his Lutheran faith." He was presented with the heretical Lutheran statements that had been attributed to him, and he confirmed them all, since according to Baldo they were in agreement with scripture. As Baldo didn't show repentance, he was thence accused of heresy and sentenced to death. He appealed against the judges to the futuro Concilio generale libero (to the future free general council).

Whilst he was awaiting his execution, he managed to let his answer to the judges get out of the jail to his friends, who then had it printed. The text reached Germany and was spread in Venice, with the authorities requesting an inquiry. Baldo continued to preach during his imprisonment, and as a result he was punished with his meals being reduced to bread and water for five months.

After unsuccessfully attempting to force him to recant, with Baldo continuing to affirm his beliefs, and now directly attacking the Pope, they decided to have him quietly executed (sine sonitu et sine strepitu). His sentence was pronounced on 17 September 1556. He was to be expelled from the ecclesiastic order and drowned immediately thereafter.
