= Rogočana =

Rogočana Rogozzana
- Village
- Location within Croatia
- Coordinates: 45°04′16″N 14°06′14″E
- Country: Croatia
- County: Istria County
- Municipality: Labin

Area
  - Total: 0.66 sq mi (1.7 km^{2})
- Elevation: 837 ft (255 m)

Population (2021)
  - Total: 154
  - Density: 230/sq mi (91/km^{2})
- Time zone: UTC+1 (CET)
  - Summer (DST): UTC+2 (CEST)
- Postal code: 52220 Labin
- Area code: 052

Rogočana (Italian: Rogozzana) is a village in the Labin-Albona municipality in Istria County, Croatia

== Demographics ==
According to the 2021 census, its population was 154. It was 143 in 2011.
