= Salakovci =

Salakovci Salaco
- Village
- Location within Croatia
- Coordinates: 45°03′14″N 14°05′10″E
- Country: Croatia
- County: Istria County
- Municipality: Labin

Area
  - Total: 0.31 sq mi (0.8 km^{2})
- Elevation: 920 ft (280 m)

Population (2021)
  - Total: 62
  - Density: 200/sq mi (78/km^{2})
- Time zone: UTC+1 (CET)
  - Summer (DST): UTC+2 (CEST)
- Postal code: 52220 Labin
- Area code: 052

Salakovci (Italian: Salaco) is a village in the Labin-Albona municipality in Istria County, Croatia.

== Demographics ==
According to the 2021 census, its population was 62. It was 48 in 2011.
