= Ripenda Kras =

Ripenda Kras Ripenda Carso
- Village
- Location within Croatia
- Coordinates: 45°06′07″N 14°09′04″E
- Country: Croatia
- County: Istria County
- Municipality: Labin

Area
  - Total: 2.0 sq mi (5.2 km^{2})
- Elevation: 920 ft (280 m)

Population (2021)
  - Total: 122
  - Density: 61/sq mi (23/km^{2})
- Time zone: UTC+1 (CET)
  - Summer (DST): UTC+2 (CEST)
- Postal code: 52220 Labin
- Area code: 052

Ripenda Kras (Italian: Ripenda Carso) is a village in the Labin-Albona municipality in Istria County, Croatia.

== Demographics ==
According to the 2021 census, its population was 122. It was 124 in 2011.
