= Evelina Galo =

Yugoslav handball player

Personal information
- Nationality: Croatian
- Born: Labin, NR Croatia, FNR Yugoslavia

Sport
- Sport: Handball
National team
Years	Team	Apps	(Gls)
–	Yugoslavia	35	(35)

Evelina Galo is a Croatian former handball player.

She has been credited as one of the greatest players in Yugoslavia's history.

== Biography ==
Galo was born in Labin, Istria (today Croatia, then Yugoslavia). She started playing for her hometown club, ŽRK Rudar Labin.

She played as a regular for Yugoslavia women's A national team. With Yugoslavia, Galo took part in several international competitions, including the 1978 World Championship in Czechoslovakia. She played a total of 35 games for Yugoslavia.

She was a valuable player for Yugoslavia, and today is regarded as ŽRK Rudar Labin's well known player of all time.
