= Dragutin Lesar =

Croatian politician

Member of Parliament
- In office 22 December 2003 – 25 September 2015
- President: Stjepan Mesić (2003–2010) Ivo Josipović (2010–2015) Kolinda Grabar-Kitarović (2015)
- Prime Minister: Ivo Sanader (2003–2009) Jadranka Kosor (2009–2011) Zoran Milanović (2011–2015)
- Constituency: III electoral district

1st President of the Croatian Labourists – Labour Party
- In office 31 March 2010 – 25 May 2014
- Succeeded by: Nansi Tireli

Personal details
- Born: 4 March 1956 (age 70) Mačkovec, PR Croatia, Yugoslavia
- Party: Croatian Labourists – Labour Party (2010–2015)
- Other political affiliations: Croatian People's Party (1996–2008)
- Spouse: Anica Lesar
- Occupation: Politician, union leader

Dragutin Lesar (born 4 March 1956) is a retired Croatian politician. Originally a union leader in the 1980s, he joined the liberal Croatian People's Party (HNS) in 1996. As member of HNS he was elected to the Croatian Parliament in the 2003 and 2007 general elections and served in the 5th and 6th Sabor. In April 2008 he resigned from HNS and continued to serve in the parliament as an independent. In April 2010 he founded the left wing Croatian Labourists – Labour Party (HL) and became their first party president.

== Early life ==
Dragutin Lesar was born on 4 March 1956 in village Mačkovec near Čakovec in Socialist Republic of Croatia. He attended a primary school in Mačkovec, and later Šenkovec, where he moved in 1953. Due to poor financial situation, his secondary education is that of a commercialist, despite his wishes to attend a gymnasium in Zagreb. His father died in 1972, after an accident at the workplace. Lesar sponsored his own education with various awards he received as an excellent student. After finishing high school in 1975, he worked at a number of places: a department store, a shoe store and an iron foundry in Čakovec. While working at the foundry he also studied sales management.

== Trade union activity ==
He started his trade union activities in 1978 as a union representative. In 1980 he became secretary of the Čakovec Municipal Council of Trade Unions. He left the Municipal Council of Trade Unions because of the disagreement with local Communist Party officials. After that, he moved to Mursko Središće and employed in "Gorenje-Mural", an aluminium radiator factory, where he worked as a sales director. After that, he is employed in the iron foundry in Čakovec, where he conducts procurement operations and forms commercial service. In 1985 he joins again the trade union. He became secretary of the trade union in Čakovec by a tender. On his initiative, on 7 April 1990 "Union of Workers Employed in Private Sector" was founded. This union was later renamed "Croatian Union of Non-Industrial Workers and Private Employees".

Since attempt of reformation of Union of Syndicates of Croatia failed in 1990, Lesar, Vesna Dejanović, Ivan Miletić and Milan Krivokuća founded Union of Independent Syndicates of Croatia (Croatian: Savez samostalnih sindikata Hrvatska) at the end of 1990. In January 1991 Lesar became president of SSSH. From January 1991 until March 1996 he performed this duty, when he resigned and joined PPDIV Syndicate.

== Political career ==
In autumn of 1996, he contacted Radimir Čačić, Srećko Bijelić, Savka Dabčević-Kučar and Dragutin Haramija and joined Croatian People's Party (HNS), and few months later he became the party's vice-president and worked so in the party for next 12 years. During the local elections in 1997 he was holder of the list for Međimurje County and candidate for House of Counties of Croatian Sabor. His rivals were Franjo Tuđman, Ivica Račan, Vlado Gotovac and Drago Stipac. He won 14.66% of votes and thus he did not enter the Sabor, but he did succeed in winning 5 seats for County Assembly and made a coalition with Croatian Social Liberal Party and Croatian Peasant Party and thus removed Croatian Democratic Union from ruling role. Lesar became prefect's deputy. During 2000, Međimurje County Assembly accepts Lesar's proposal for foundation of Međimurje solidarity foundation "Katruža", and he becomes the manager of the foundation. On local elections in 2001 he won 6 seats and formed the same coalition and again becomes prefect's deputy.

During the Croatian parliamentary elections of 2003, Lesar was the top-ranked candidate of the electoral list of HNS for the 3rd Electoral District. HNS won 2 seats, so Lesar entered in Sabor along with Radimir Čačić. During the parliamentary elections of 2007 he again became member of the parliament, but due to conflict with newly elected president of the HNS Radimir Čačić, he left HNS and acted as independent member of parliament since April 2008.

On 31 March 2010 Lesar founded Croatian Labourists – Labour Party and became its president. He competed in the 2011 Croatian parliamentary election and won six seats in parliament. He resigned as party president in May 2014 after losing a seat in the European elections 2014. After his term in the Croatian parliament ended in September 2015, he announced his retirement from politics.

== Personal life ==
In 1977 he married Anica, who gave birth to their son, Igor, the same year. In 1984, they got a daughter, Maja.
