= Bartići =

Bartići Bartici
- Village
- Location within Croatia
- Coordinates: 45°03′07″N 14°06′29″E
- Country: Croatia
- County: Istria County
- Municipality: Labin

Area
  - Total: 2.6 sq mi (6.8 km^{2})
- Elevation: 1,165 ft (355 m)

Population (2021)
  - Total: 62
  - Density: 24/sq mi (9.1/km^{2})
- Time zone: UTC+1 (CET)
  - Summer (DST): UTC+2 (CEST)
- Postal code: 52220 Labin
- Area code: 052

Bartići (Italian: Bartici) is a village in the Labin-Albona municipality in Istria County, Croatia.

== Demographics ==
According to the 2021 census, its population was 62. It was 72 in 2011.
