= Kapelica, Istria County =

Kapelica Cappelletta
- Village
- Location within Croatia
- Coordinates: 45°04′52″N 14°05′49″E
- Country: Croatia
- County: Istria County
- Municipality: Labin

Area
  - Total: 1.6 sq mi (4.1 km^{2})

Population (2021)
  - Total: 635
  - Density: 400/sq mi (150/km^{2})
- Time zone: UTC+1 (CET)
  - Summer (DST): UTC+2 (CEST)
- Postal code: 52220 Labin
- Area code: 052

Kapelica (Italian: Cappelletta) is a village in the Labin-Albona municipality in Istria County, Croatia.

== Demographics ==
According to the 2021 census, its population was 635. It was 617 in 2011.
