= Duga Luka, Croatia =

Duga Luka Portolungo
- Village
- Location within Croatia
- Coordinates: 45°02′53″N 14°09′22″E
- Country: Croatia
- County: Istria County
- Municipality: Labin

Area
  - Total: 1.2 km^{2} (0.46 sq mi)
- Elevation: 30 m (98 ft)

Population (2021)
  - Total: 30
  - Density: 25/km^{2} (65/sq mi)
- Time zone: UTC+1 (CET)
  - Summer (DST): UTC+2 (CEST)

Duga Luka (Italian: Portolungo; also known as Prtlog) is a village in the Labin-Albona municipality in Istria County, Croatia.

== Demographics ==
According to the 2021 census, its population was 30. It was 27 in 2011.
