= Tino Černjul =

Croatian handball player (born 1973)

Personal information
- Nationality: Croatian
- Born: 10 October 1973 (age 53) Labin, Croatia
- Height: 1.95 m (6 ft 5 in)

Sport
- Sport: Handball
- Position: Left back
- Current club: Retired
- Number: 12

Youth career
- Years: Team
- –: Rudar Labin

Senior clubs
- Years: Team
- 1991-1995: RK Rudar Labin
- 1995-1998: RK Zamet Rijeka
- 1998-1999: RK Arena Pula
- 1999-2001: RK Plomin Linja Rudar Labin
- 2001-2002: RK Senj
- 2002-2005: RK Zamet Crotek
- 2005-2010: RK Mladi Rudar

Tino Černjul (born 10 October 1973) is a former Croatian handballer, who played as a left back.

He played eleven years in Labin mostly in the second tier of Croatian handball. His biggest success was playing for RK Zamet in the Croatian Premier Handball League (first tier) and playing EHF Cup matches with the club.

== Honours ==
RK Rudar Labin

- 1.B HRL - South (1): 1992–93

RK Zamet

- 1.B HRL - South (1): 1995–96

RK Arena Pula

- 1.B HRL - South (1): 1998–99

RK Plomin Linja Rudar Labin

- 1.B HRL (1): 1999–2000

RK Senj

- 2. HRL - West (1): 2001-02
