= Orlando Mohorović =

Croatian artist

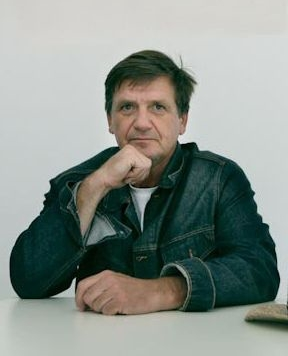
- Born: 7 March 1950; Labin, Croatia
- Education: Kunstakademie Düsseldorf
- Known for: Painting, Conceptual art, Performance

Orlando Mohorović (born 1950 in Labin) is a Croatian artist. He is one of the original members of a group of artists called Labinski atelieri.

Mohorović came to Düsseldorf in 1969 and met Joseph Beuys there. The Admission Board of the department Free art at the Kunstakademie Düsseldorf admitted him as a student to Beuys' courses of . Orlando Mohorović was studying painting and sculpture from 1970 to 1974. At that time New Realism paintings, conceptual art, performance, sketches, small drawings and aquarelle as a pattern for installations were developed.

In 1970 he had his first exhibition in the room 20 and in the hallway.

On 5 February 1974 he was appointed master student of the Beuys class. Mohorović belonged to the group of Beuys-students, like many other renowned German artists (Jörg Immendorff, Katharina Sieverding, Anselm Kiefer, Blinky Palermo, Sigmar Polke) .

== Exhibitions ==
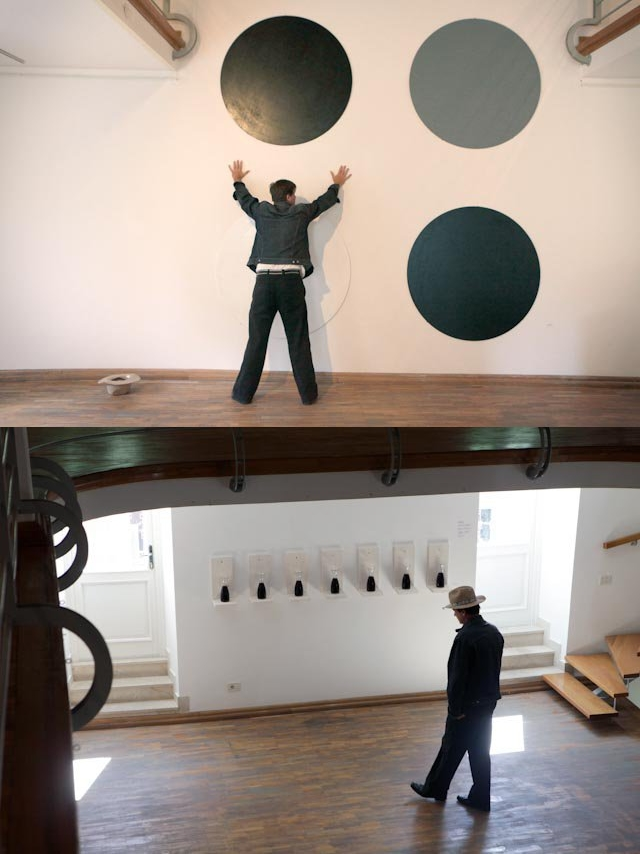
Latest Exhibition

List of some important independent and group exhibitions:

- 1970 "Düsseldorf art academy", room 20 and hallway
- 1972 Labin "Galerie Orlando", dedicated to an accidentally passing by person Nino Bateli
- 1973 Düsseldorf hall of art "Between 7 – Yes sir, that’s my baby" and London Gallery House – Goethe institute London "Some 260 miles from here..."
- 1974 Pazin "ethnographic Museum of Istria"
- 1977 Zagreb "Dubrava Gallery" (conceptual art)
- 1994 Split "Biannual festival of small format paintings and sculptures"
- 2001 Karlovac "Triannual festival Croatian aquarelle"
- 2001 Florence " Biennale Internazionale dell' Arte Contemporanea
- 2003 Ravenna "XIV Biennale Internazionale Dantesca"
- 2004 Buzet "Heritage Museum" 1+1 Mohorović – Gerić
- 2006 Sarajevo "Roman Petrovic Gallery"
- 2008 Pula "Museum of Contemporary Art" Netz installation
- 2010 Rijeka "Gallery Juraj Klović" O.Mohorović – A.Floričić
- 2011 New York "Gallery MC" Inter Imago
- 2012 New York "Gallery MC" Inter Imago Armory

== Collections ==
Buzet "Homeland Museum"; Labin "Folk museum"; Pula "City art collection"; Labin "Council House" Belgrade "Open University Brother Stamenkovic"; Pazin "City museum"; Ozalj " Art Collection Slave Rackaj"; Ravenna " Art Collection Centro Dantesca"
