= Lorena Beučić =

Yugoslav handball player

Personal information
- Nationality: Croatian
- Born: Labin, NR Croatia, FNR Yugoslavia

Sport
- Sport: Handball
Medal record
Women's handball
Representing Yugoslavia
U-20 World Championship
Gold medal – first place	1977 Romania	U-20 Team

Lorena Beučić is a Yugoslav former handball player.

Born in Labin, Istria, she grew up in the local ŽRK Rudar Labin. She played for both the Yugoslavian and the Croatian national teams.

In 1977 she was, together with Biserka Emer, Ema Gabrić, Željka Maras, Ornela Paliska, Snježana Perić and Jasna Ptujec one of the six Croatian players who were part of the broader Yugoslavia women's national junior handball team that won the gold at the 1977 Women's Junior World Handball Championship in Romania. It is the only gold won by Yugoslavia women's national junior handball team.
