= Presika, Istria County =

Presika Fratta
- Village
- Location within Croatia
- Coordinates: 45.081°N 14.119°E
- Country: Croatia
- County: Istria County
- Municipality: Labin

Area
  - Total: 1.6 km^{2} (0.62 sq mi)

Population (2021)
  - Total: 561
  - Density: 350/km^{2} (910/sq mi)
- Time zone: UTC+1 (CET)
  - Summer (DST): UTC+2 (CEST)
- Postal code: 52220 Labin
- Area code: +385 (0)52
- Vehicle registration: PU

Presika (Italian: Fratta) is a village in the Labin-Albona municipality in Istria County, Croatia.

== History ==
Between the two World Wars, Presika was notable for its open-pit quarries.

== Demographics ==
According to the 2021 census, its population was 561. It was 578 in 2011.

Historical population

Year	Pop.	±%
1857	264	—
1869	293	+11.0%
1880	332	+13.3%
1890	382	+15.1%
1948	440	+15.2%

Year	Pop.	±%
1953	393	−10.7%
1961	351	−10.7%
1971	249	−29.1%
1981	236	−5.2%
1991	339	+43.6%

Year	Pop.	±%
2001	453	+33.6%
2011	578	+27.6%
2021	561	−2.9%

Note: In 1857, 1869, 1921, and 1931, data was included in the settlement of Labin.
Source: Publications of the Croatian Bureau of Statistics
Source data
