= Breg, Croatia =

Breg Montagna
- Village
- Location within Croatia
- Coordinates: 45°03′36″N 14°04′55″E
- Country: Croatia
- County: Istria
- Municipality: Labin

Area
  - Total: 2.0 km^{2} (0.77 sq mi)
- Elevation: 272 m (892 ft)

Population (2021)
  - Total: 46
  - Density: 23/km^{2} (60/sq mi)
- Time zone: UTC+1 (CET)
  - Summer (DST): UTC+2 (CEST)

Breg (Italian: Montagna) is a village in the Labin-Albona municipality in Istria County, Croatia.

== Demographics ==
According to the 2021 census, its population was 46. It was 39 in 2011.
