= Vinež =

Vinež Vines
- Village
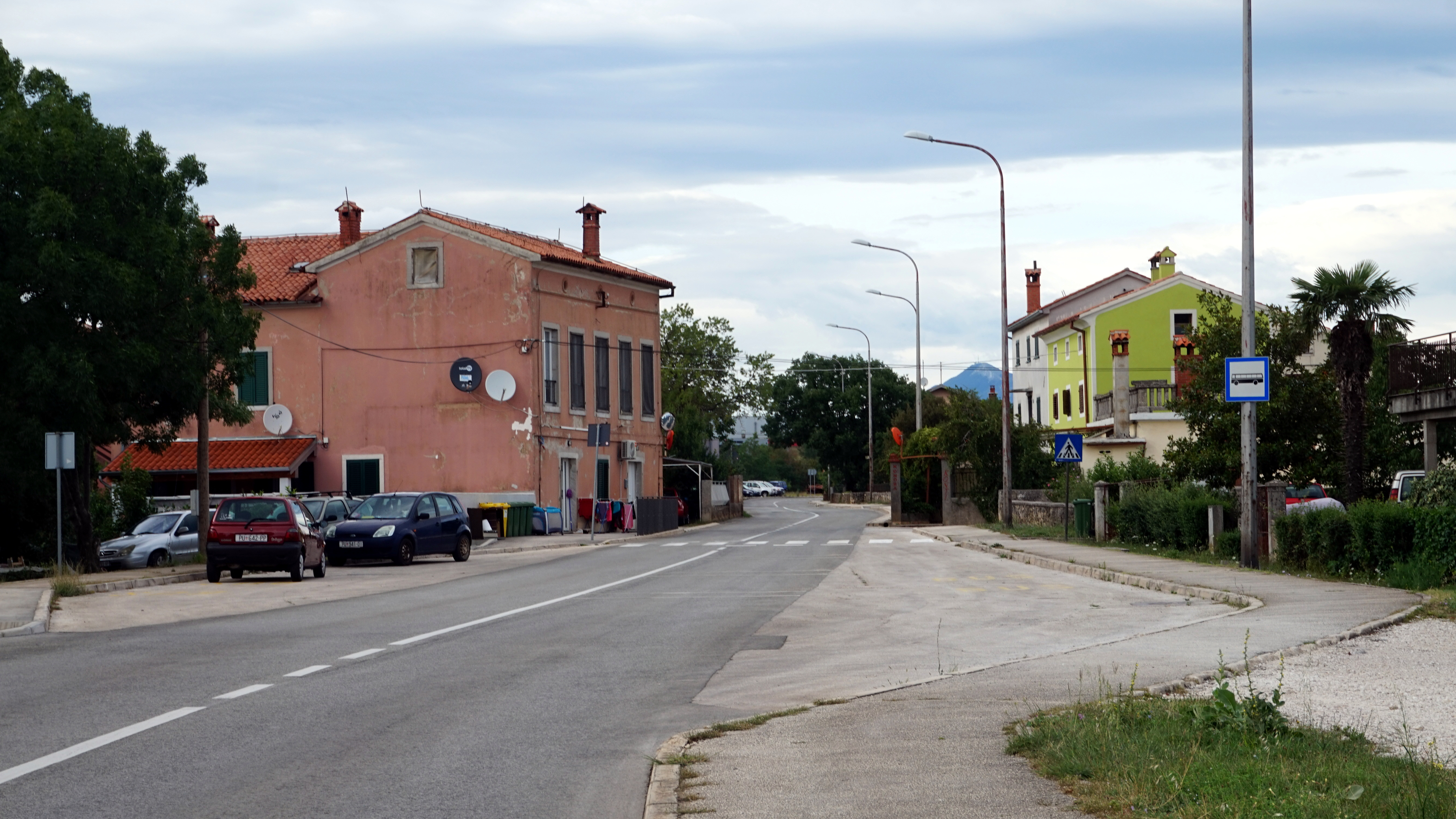

- Location within Croatia
- Coordinates: 45°06′07″N 14°06′14″E
- Country: Croatia
- County: Istria County
- Municipality: Labin

Area
  - Total: 1.1 sq mi (2.9 km^{2})
- Elevation: 738 ft (225 m)

Population (2021)
  - Total: 1,172
  - Density: 1,000/sq mi (400/km^{2})
- Time zone: UTC+1 (CET)
  - Summer (DST): UTC+2 (CEST)
- Postal code: 52220 Labin
- Area code: 052

Vinež (Italian: Vines) is a village in the town of Labin-Albona in Istria County, Croatia.

== Demographics ==
According to the 2021 census, its population was 1,172. It was 1,219 in 2011.
