= Yugoslav Women's Handball Championship =

The Yugoslav Women's Handball Championship was the premier championship for women's handball clubs in SFR Yugoslavia. Founded like its male counterpart in 1953, it was dissolved in 1992 following the breakup of Yugoslavia.

The championship's most successful teams were Radnički Belgrade with fourteen championships (including ten titles in a row) and Lokomotiva Zagreb with ten. Budućnost Titograd follows with four titles, while Spartak Subotica won three, and Lokomotiva Virovitica, Podravka Koprivnica and Voždovac Belgrade clinched two.

The teams from the championship were successful in international competitions, most notably Radnički Belgrade winning three European Cups and three Cup Winners' Cups. ŽRK Osijek and ŽRK Split also won the Cup Winners' Cup and ŽRK Trešnjevka and Lokomotiva Zagreb did the same in the EHF Cup, while Budućnost Titograd won both competitions.

== List of champions ==
- 1953 Mirko Kljajić
- 1954 Železničar Belgrade
- 1955 Lokomotiva Virovitica
- 1956 Lokomotiva Zagreb
- 1957 Spartak Subotica
- 1958 Lokomotiva Virovitica
- 1959 Lokomotiva Zagreb
- 1960 Spartak Subotica
- 1961 BSK Belgrade
- 1962 Lokomotiva Zagreb
- 1963 Spartak Subotica
- 1964 Lokomotiva Zagreb
- 1965 Lokomotiva Zagreb
- 1966 Podravka Koprivnica
- 1967 Podravka Koprivnica
- 1968 Lokomotiva Zagreb
- 1969 Lokomotiva Zagreb
- 1970 Lokomotiva Zagreb
- 1971 Voždovac Belgrade
- 1972 Radnički Belgrade
- 1973 Radnički Belgrade
- 1974 Lokomotiva Zagreb
- 1975 Radnički Belgrade
- 1976 Radnički Belgrade
- 1977 Radnički Belgrade
- 1978 Radnički Belgrade
- 1979 Radnički Belgrade
- 1980 Radnički Belgrade
- 1981 Radnički Belgrade
- 1982 Radnički Belgrade
- 1983 Radnički Belgrade
- 1984 Radnički Belgrade
- 1985 Budućnost Titograd
- 1986 Radnički Belgrade
- 1987 Radnički Belgrade
- 1988 Voždovac Belgrade
- 1989 Budućnost Titograd
- 1990 Budućnost Titograd
- 1991 Lokomotiva Zagreb
- 1992 Budućnost Titograd
