= Labin =

Labin Albona
- Town
- Grad Labin; Comune di Albona; Town of Labin
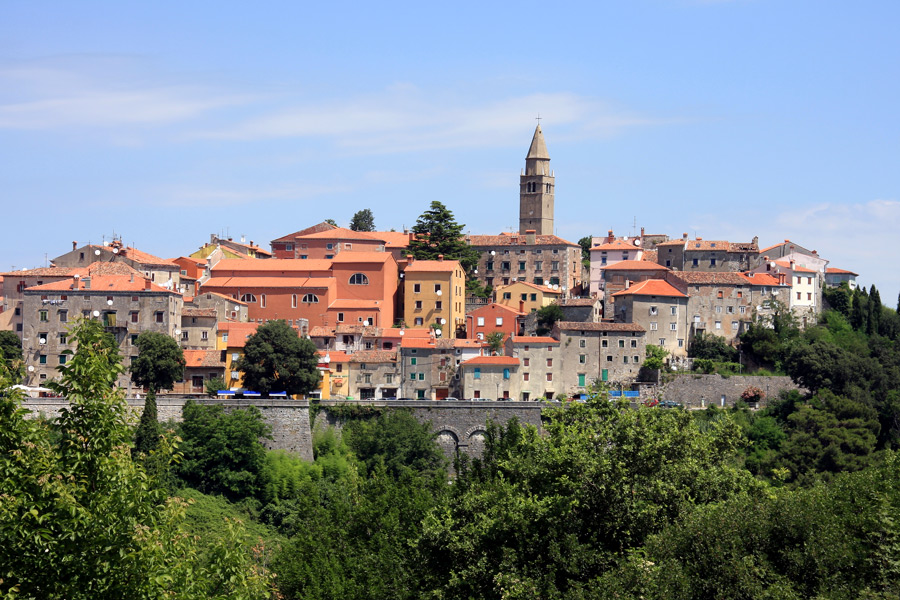
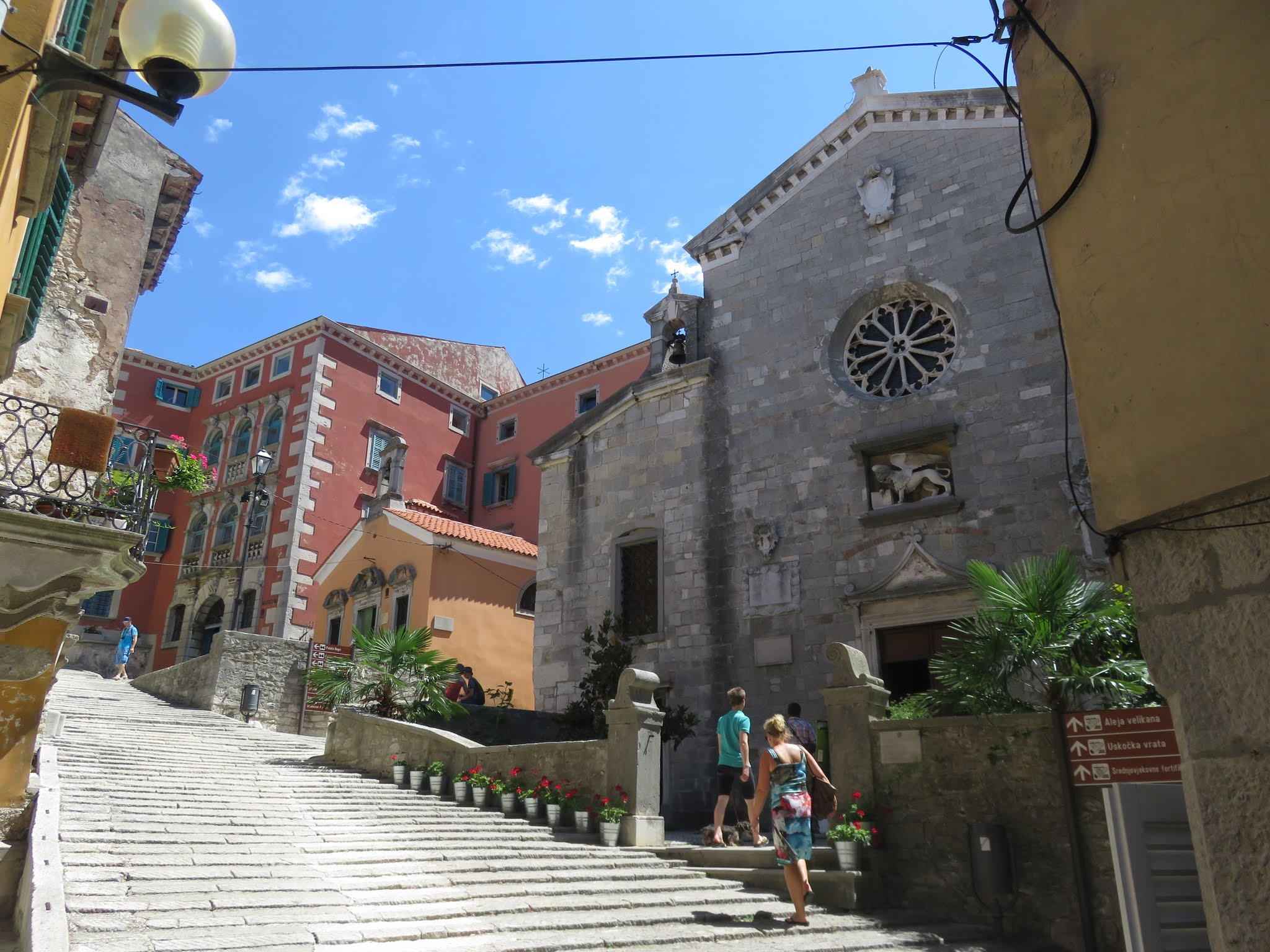
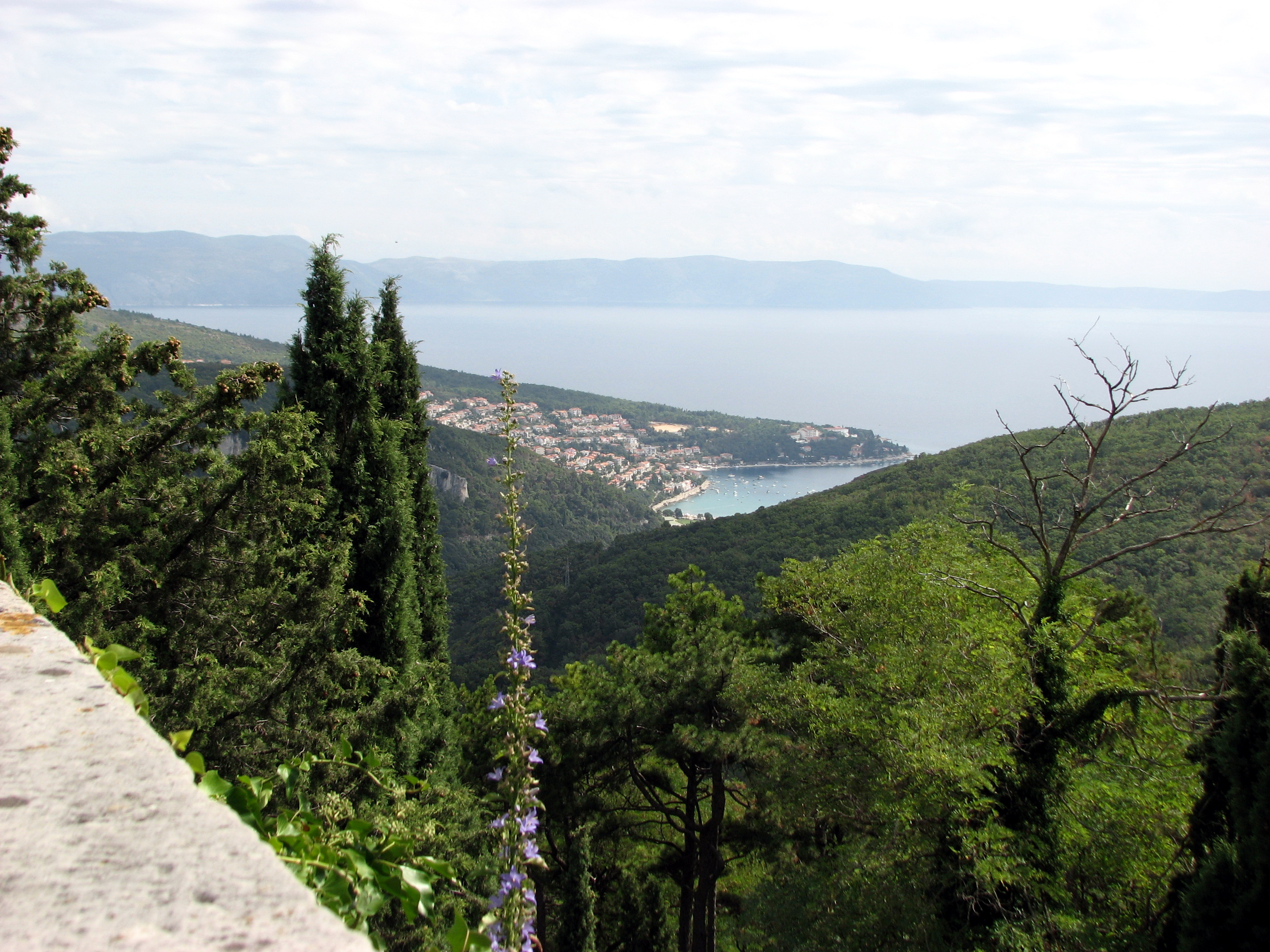
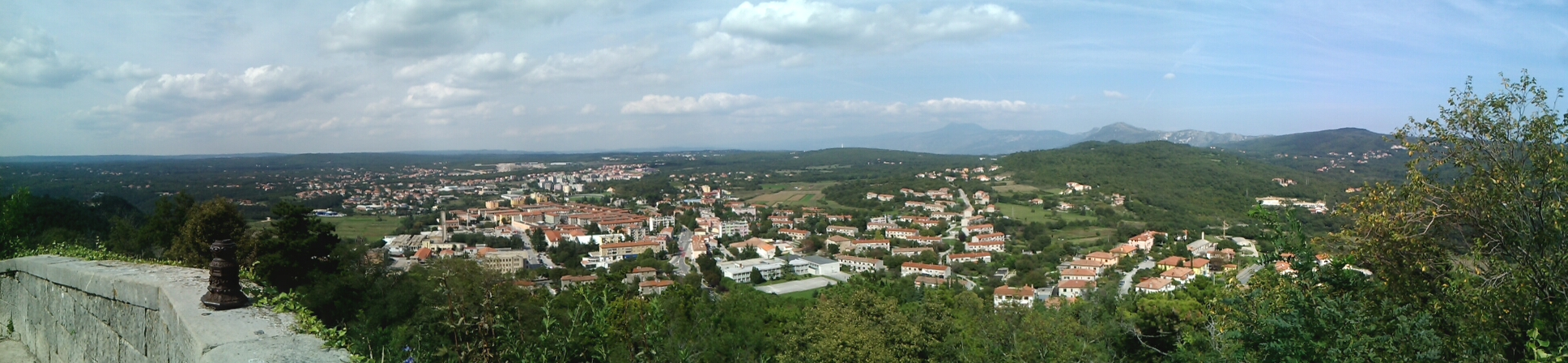
- Labin

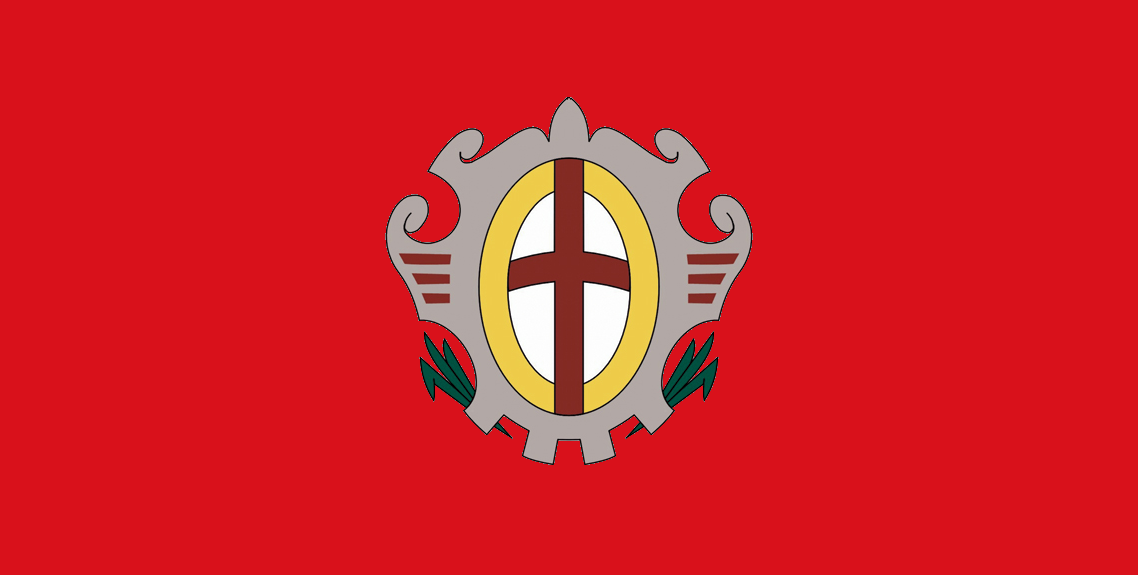
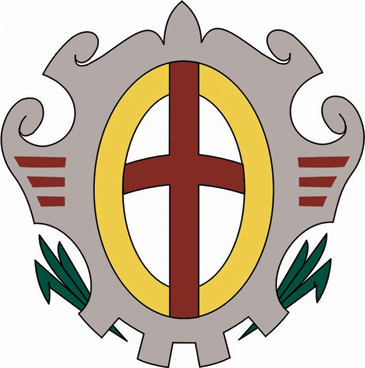
- Flag Coat of arms

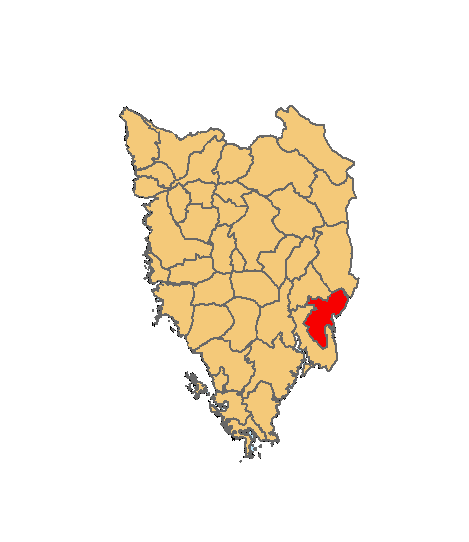
- Location of Labin municipality in Istria

- Location within Croatia
- Country: Croatia
- Region: Istria
- County: Istria County
- First mention (Artemidorus of Ephesus): 2nd century BC

Government
  - Type: Mayor-Council
  - Mayor: Donald Blašković (independent)
  - City Council: 15 members: • IDS, ISU (9); • SDP (2), • Democrats (2), • Ind. Silvano Vlačić (1); • HDZ (1)

Area
  - Town: 72.3 km^{2} (27.9 sq mi)
  - Urban: 7.3 km^{2} (2.8 sq mi)
- Elevation: 210–320 m (690–1,050 ft)

Population (2021)
  - Town: 10,424
  - Density: 144/km^{2} (373/sq mi)
  - Urban: 5,806
  - Urban density: 800/km^{2} (2,100/sq mi)
- Demonym(s): Labinjonka (female); Labinjon (male)
- Time zone: UTC+1 (CET)
  - Summer (DST): UTC+2 (CEST)
- Postal code: 52220
- Area code: 052
- Vehicle registration: PU
- Patron saints: St. Justus
- Town day: August 19
- Website: labin.hr

Labin (Italian/Istriot: Albona) is a town in Istria, west Croatia, with a town population of 5,806 (2021) and 10,424 in the greater municipality (which also includes the small towns of Rabac-Porto Albona and Vinež-Vines, as well as a number of smaller villages).

== History ==
Historical affiliations

- Liburnia (9th century BC – 177 BC)
- Roman Republic (177–27 BCE)
- Roman Empire (27 BCE – 476)
- Odoacer's Kingdom of Italy (476–493)
- Ostrogothic Kingdom (493–538)
- Byzantine Empire (540–751)
- Frankish Kingdom (788–925)
- Kingdom of Croatia (925–1102)
- Holy Roman Empire (1102–1420)
- Republic of Venice (1420–1797)
- (Austrian Empire) Habsburg monarchy (1797–1804)
- Austrian Empire (1804–1805)
- Napoleonic Italy (1803–1809)
- Illyrian Provinces (1809–1814)
- Austrian Empire later Austria-Hungary (1814–1918)
- Kingdom of Italy (1918–1945)
- SFR Yugoslavia (SR Croatia) (1947–1991)
- Croatia (1991–present)

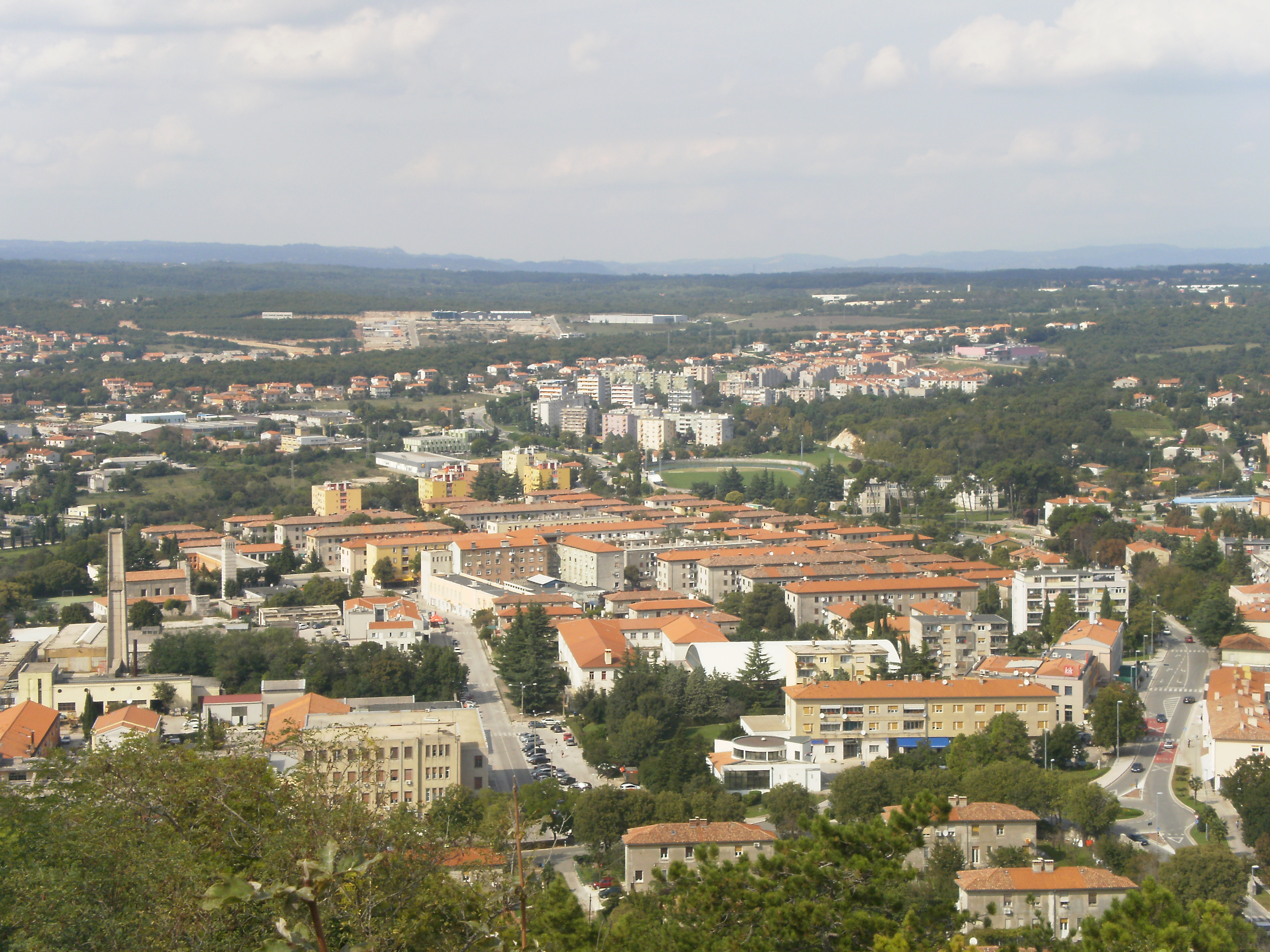
View over the town

Labin developed from the site of the Roman settlement of Albona. Its name predates classical antiquity and is derived from Proto-Indo-European *alb- ("eminence", "hill"). Before and under the Roman occupation, Albona was an important commune. On a marble tablet the Roman inscription we read that under the Emperor Marco Iulio Severo Filippo noble Caesar noble Prince made Albona a Republic. To be a republic it had to have two joined Magistrates called Duumviri and Public officers called Aediles which took care of Public buildings and other official duties.

Labin (Albona) was founded by the Liburnians and was at the time known as Alvona, being located at the northwestern edge of Liburnia. It was then colonized by the Romans in 177 BC. In the 5th century AD it was conqueted by the Ostrogoths, Byzantium and the Lombards, and in 788 it fell under Frankish rule. In the Middle Ages it was part of the Kingdom of Croatia, being located at its northwestern border, as in Liburnian times.

In 1208 it passed to the Patriarchate of Aquileia. From 1295 it was under the rule of the dukes of Pazin, and from 1381 it found itself under the jurisdiction of the Patriarchate of Aquileia. From 1420 until 1797 it was ruled from the Republic of Venice and after that belonged to Austrian Empire until 1918, when it was annexed to the Kingdom of Italy. Labin, as a Croatian-speaking town, was for a long time the centre of Croatia's largest coal mining district, with four mines operating at the height of its production. In March and April 1921, the town was the scene of a miners' strike which quickly grew into an anti-fascist rebellion, considered to be the first of its kind, and the declaration of the short-lived Labin Republic. The mine in downtown Labin closed in 1989. The large, coal-fired power plant in nearby Plomin now has its coal imported from outside sources once the mines were closed. After the Treaty of Peace with Italy, 1947, Labin, like the whole of Istria, was annexed to Yugoslavia.

The famous Lutheran reformer Matthias Flacius Illyricus (3 March 1520 – 11 March 1575), was born in Labin and a small exhibition in what was once his house, commemorates this. Unfortunately, due to the counter-reformation, he was forced to live most of his life in exile in Germany where he became the undisputed leader of the conservative wing of the Lutheran movement after the death of Luther. His chief literary legacy was in the area of biblical exegesis.

== Population ==
=== Settlements ===
The town's administrative area consists of 17 settlements:

- Bartići
- Breg
- Duga Luka
- Gondolići
- Gora Glušići
- Kapelica
- Kranjci
- Labin
- Marceljani
- Presika
- Rabac
- Ripenda Kosi
- Ripenda Kras
- Ripenda Verbanci
- Rogočana
- Salakovci
- Vinež

=== Demographics ===
Historical populations of Labin
Year	Pop.	±%
1857	2,283	—
1869	2,698	+18.2%
1880	3,722	+38.0%
1890	4,231	+13.7%
1900	4,369	+3.3%
1910	4,564	+4.5%
1921	4,495	−1.5%
1931	3,531	−21.4%
1945	6,493	+83.9%
1948	7,958	+22.6%
1953	9,851	+23.8%
1961	10,253	+4.1%
1971	10,778	+5.1%
1981	12,014	+11.5%
1991	13,144	+9.4%
2001	12,426	−5.5%
2011	11,642	−6.3%
2021	10,424	−10.5%
Source: Naselja i stanovništvo Republike Hrvatske 1857–2001, DZS, Zagreb, 2005; Source for year 1945: Cadastre National de l'Istrie, Jadranski institut Sušak, 1946.

Town of Labin: Population trends 1857–2021
v

population	2283	2698	3722	4231	4369	4564	4495	3531	7958	9851	10253	10778	12014	13144	12426	11642	10424
	1857	1869	1880	1890	1900	1910	1921	1931	1948	1953	1961	1971	1981	1991	2001	2011	2021

Sources: Croatian Bureau of Statistics publications

Religion in Labin (2021 Census)
religion	percent
Roman Catholic	53.83%
Atheism and Agnosticism	13.76%
Islam	9.95%
Other Christians	5.84%
Undeclared	5.61%
Eastern Orthodoxy	2.28%
Protestantism	0.07%
Others and unspecified	8.66%

Ethnic composition in Labin (2021 Census)
ethnicity	percent
Croats	71.19%
Istrians	9.65%
Bosniaks	7.44%
Serbs	1.89%
Italians	1.77%
Albanians	0.61%
Slovenes	0.48%
Montenegrins	0.15%
Germans	0.14%
Others and unspecified	6.68%

Ethnic composition in Labin (1945 Census)
ethnicity	percent
Croats	80.27%
Italians	16.31%
Slovenes	2.40%
Undeclared	0.62%
Serbs	0.09%
Others	0.23%

== Climate ==
Between 1993 and 2006, the highest temperature recorded at the local weather station was 36.2 °C (97.2 °F), on 4 August 1994. The coldest temperature was −10.5 °C (13.1 °F), on 26 January 2000.

Since records began in 2006, the lowest temperature recorded at the Dubrova weather station was −10.0 °C (14.0 °F), on 17 January 2010.

Climate data for Labin
Month	Jan	Feb	Mar	Apr	May	Jun	Jul	Aug	Sep	Oct	Nov	Dec	Year
Mean daily maximum °C (°F)	8 (46)	8 (46)	12 (54)	16 (61)	20 (68)	24 (75)	27 (81)	27 (81)	22 (72)	17 (63)	13 (55)	9 (48)	17 (63)
Daily mean °C (°F)	5 (41)	6 (43)	9 (48)	13 (55)	17 (63)	21 (70)	24 (75)	24 (75)	19 (66)	15 (59)	11 (52)	7 (45)	14 (58)
Mean daily minimum °C (°F)	3 (37)	3 (37)	6 (43)	10 (50)	14 (57)	18 (64)	20 (68)	20 (68)	16 (61)	13 (55)	9 (48)	5 (41)	11 (52)
Average rainfall mm (inches)	101 (4.0)	104 (4.1)	99 (3.9)	96 (3.8)	94 (3.7)	68 (2.7)	60 (2.4)	76 (3.0)	164 (6.5)	187 (7.4)	211 (8.3)	135 (5.3)	1,395 (55.1)
Average rainy days	8	7	8	8	7	6	5	5	8	10	11	9	92
Average relative humidity (%)	75	72	71	70	71	67	64	65	70	75	77	75	71

== Culture ==
Language

Labinjonska Cakavica, one of the most interesting and oldest Istrian dialects spoken in and around the town of Labin. It belongs to Northern Chakavian dialect of the Chakavian variety of Croatian. It differs from the usual Chakavian (with typical pronoun "ča") because it lacks most palatals, with other parallel deviations called "tsakavism" (cakavizam). In 2019, by the decision of the Ministry of Culture, Labinjonska Cakavica became a protected intangible cultural asset of the Republic of Croatia.

== Sport ==
The city is the home of football club NK Rudar Labin, and handball clubs ŽRK Rudar Labin and RK Mladi Rudar Labin.

== Notable people ==
Artists

- Mate Balota (1898–1963), poet, novelist and economist, whose mother was from Labin
- Franka Batelić-Ćorluka (born 1992), singer and songwriter
- Orlando Mohorović (born 1950), artist
- Renato Percan (1936–2013), painter

Handball players

- Tino Černjul (born 1973), left back, played for RK Zamet at intervals from 1995 to 2005
- Valner Franković (born 1968), international player for Croatia
- Evelina Galo, international player for Yugoslavia
- Suzana Golja-Zulijani, international player for Croatia
- Valter Marković (born 1959), played for RK Zamet from 1975 until 1987
- Fran Mileta (born 2000), right winger, international player for Croatia
- Mladen Prskalo (born 1968), pivot, international player for Croatia
- Luka Stepančić (born 1990), right back, international player for Croatia

HNK Rijeka footballers

- Mario Brnjac (1944–2007), football defender
- Vlado Golja, football forward
- Anđelo Milevoj (born 1941), football defender
- Josip Mohorović (born 1948), football midfielder
- Roberto Paliska (born 1963), football defender
- Andrej Prskalo (born 1987), football goalkeeper
- Davor Radmanović (born 1957), football midfielder
- Sergio Stemberga (born 1942), football defender
- Valentino Stepčić (born 1990), football midfielder
- Bruno Veselica (1936–2018), football forward

Science and humanities

- Matteo Bartoli (1873–1946), linguist
- Josip Belušić (1847–1905), inventor and professor, invented the speedometer
- Matthias Flacius (1520–1575), Lutheran reformer
- Baldo Lupetino (1502–1556), protestant preacher
- Giuseppina Martinuzzi (1844–1925), pedagogue, journalist, socialist, and feminist

Others

- Antonio Bollani, Venetian general, whose mother was from Labin, who distinguished himself in the war with the Ottoman Turks (1645–1669)
- Ema Derossi-Bjelajac (1926–2020), politician, President of the Presidency of the Socialist Republic of Croatia, first woman to hold a title equivalent to a head of state in modern-day Croatia
- Anton Marti (1923–2004), television and theater director and one of the founders of Television Zagreb

== Administration and politics ==
=== Mayor ===
The current mayor of Labin is Valter Glavičić (IDS), elected in the 2021 Labin local elections which were held on 16 May 2021. There is one deputy mayor elected from the same list, Federika Mohorović Čekada.

=== Municipal Council ===
The Labin Council is composed of 15 representatives, elected in the 2021 Labin local elections.

The political groups represented in the Council (as of June 2021):

Elected on 16 May 2021
Groups	No. of members per group
Groups	2021
IDS, ISU	9 / 15
Democrats	2 / 15
SDP	2 / 15
Independents together	1 / 15
HDZ	1 / 15

=== Councils of Local Committees ===
In 2020, elections were held for the councils of all seven local committees of the City of Labin.

Elected on 5 July 2020
Groups	No. of members per group
Groups	2020
IDS	31 / 39
SDP	7 / 39
MOST	1 / 39

=== International relations ===
Twin towns – sister cities

- Idrija, Slovenia
- Manzano, Italy
- Sospirolo, Italy
- Carbonia, Italy
- Baja, Hungary
- Sandnes, Norway

Partnerships

- (Bosnia and Herzegovina) Banovići, BiH
- Rybnik, Poland

== See also ==
- Labinština
- Labin Republic

== Sources ==
- Šimunović, Petar (March 2013). "Predantički toponimi u današnjoj (i povijesnoj) Hrvatskoj" [Pre-Roman placenames in present-day (and historical) Croatia] (PDF). Folia onomastica Croatica (in Croatian) (22). Zagreb: Croatian Academy of Sciences and Arts: 147–214.
