= 2027 World Men's Handball Championship qualification =

Tournament details
- Dates: 29 October 2025 – 17 May 2026
- Teams: 78 (from 6 confederations)

The 2027 World Men's Handball Championship qualification decided who qualified for the 2027 World Men's Handball Championship in Germany. Qualifying occurred between October 2025 and May 2026. The championship will feature 32 teams for the fourth time. The first game in qualification was played between Cyprus and Turkey on 29 October 2025.

== Qualified teams ==
Team qualified Team failed to qualify Team withdrew or suspended Did not enter

Team	Qualification method	Date of qualification	Appearance(s)				Previous best performance (Note: Bold text indicates they hosted that edition.)
Team	Qualification method	Date of qualification	Total	First	Last	Streak	Previous best performance
Germany	Host nation	28 January 2020	29th (Note: From both German teams only East Germany was qualified in 1990.)	1938	2025	15	Champions (1938, 1978, 2007)
Denmark	Defending champions	2 February 2025	27th	1938	2025	13	Champions (2019, 2021, 2023, 2025)
Brazil	Top four at 2026 South and Central American Championship	21 January 2026	18th	1958	2025	17	Seventh place (2025)
Argentina	Top four at 2026 South and Central American Championship	21 January 2026	16th	1997	2025	16	Eleventh place (2021)
Chile	Top four at 2026 South and Central American Championship	24 January 2026	9th	2011	2025	9	16th place (2019)
Uruguay	Top four at 2026 South and Central American Championship	24 January 2026	3rd	2021	2023	1	24th place (2021)
Japan	Semifinalist at 2026 Asian Championship	25 January 2026	17th	1961	2025	2	Tenth place (1970)
Qatar	Semifinalist at 2026 Asian Championship	25 January 2026	11th	2003	2025	8	Runners-up (2015)
Bahrain	Semifinalist at 2026 Asian Championship	25 January 2026	7th	2011	2025	6	16th place (2023)
Kuwait	Semifinalist at 2026 Asian Championship	25 January 2026	10th	1982	2025	2	15th place (1982)
Egypt	Top five at 2026 African Championship	25 January 2026	19th	1964	2025	18	Fourth place (2001)
Cape Verde	Top five at 2026 African Championship	25 January 2026	4th	2021	2025	4	23rd place (2023, 2025)
Algeria	Top five at 2026 African Championship	26 January 2026	18th	1974	2025	4	13th place (2001)
Tunisia	Top five at 2026 African Championship	26 January 2026	18th	1967	2025	17	Fourth place (2005)
Croatia	Top six at 2026 European Championship	28 January 2026	17th	1995	2025	17	Champions (2003)
Iceland	Top six at 2026 European Championship	28 January 2026	24th	1958	2025	9	Fifth place (1997)
Sweden	Top six at 2026 European Championship	28 January 2026	28th	1938	2025	7	Champions (1954, 1958, 1990, 1999)
Portugal	Top six at 2026 European Championship	28 January 2026	7th	1997	2025	4	Fourth place (2025)
Angola	Top five at 2026 African Championship	30 January 2026	6th	2005	2021	1	20th place (2005)
Norway	European playoff winner	16 May 2026	19th	1958	2025	6	Runners-up (2017, 2019)
Faroe Islands	European playoff winner	16 May 2026	Debut				
Spain	European playoff winner	16 May 2026	25th	1958	2025	23	Champions (2005, 2013)
United States	Winner of the 2026 Nor.Ca. Championship	16 May 2026	9th	1964	2025	2	16th place (1964, 1970, 1974, 1993)
Greece	European playoff winner	17 May 2026	2nd	2005	2005	1	Sixth place (2005)
Poland	European playoff winner	17 May 2026	19th	1958	2025	6	Runners-up (2007)
France	European playoff winner	17 May 2026	26th	1954	2025	19	Champions (1995, 2001, 2009, 2011, 2015, 2017)
Slovenia	European playoff winner	17 May 2026	12th	1993	2025	4	Third place (2017)
Serbia	European playoff winner	17 May 2026	21th	1964	2023	1	Champions (1986) (Note: Included Yugoslavia and Serbia and Montenegro results.)
Italy	European playoff winner	17 May 2026	3rd	1997	2025	2	16th place (2025)
North Macedonia	European playoff winner	17 May 2026	10th	1999	2025	8	Ninth place (2015)
Saudi Arabia	Wildcards	9 June 2026	11th	1997	2023	1	19th place (2003, 2013)
Turkey	Wildcards	9 June 2026	1st	Debut			

== Slot allocation ==
The slot allocation is as follows:

- AHF (Asia): 4 slots
- CAHB (Africa): 5 slots
- EHF (Europe): 10 slots (including hosts Germany)
- NACHC (North America and the Caribbean): 1 slot
- OCHF (Oceania): 0 slots
- SCAHC (South and Central America): 4 slots
- Wildcards: 2 slots

Detailed distribution of places (following current IHF rules)	Vacancies	Details	Comments
Organisers (Note: All hosting federations are automatically entitled to take part in the World Championship. If there is more than one organiser from the same continental confederation, the number of compulsory places of the respective confederation shall be reduced accordingly. If there is more than one organiser and the organisers are not from the same confederation, the IHF Council shall decide about the reduction of the compulsory places, considering only the compulsory places of the confederations involved.)	1		
Reigning world champion (Note: The reigning world champion automatically qualifies for the next World Championship and, as a rule, is placed first in the first performance row. In case the reigning world champion is also hosting the next World Championship, the confederation of the reigning world champion obtains one additional performance place.)	1		
Performance places for the continental confederations	12		Based on teams ranked 1–12 in the preceding world championship
Africa		1	As Egypt ranked 5th in previous World Championship
Asia		0	
Europe		10	
North America and the Caribbean		0	
South and Central America		1	As Brazil ranked 7th in previous World Championship
Oceania		0	
Compulsory places for the continental confederations	15		17 compulsory places
Africa		4	
Asia		4	
Europe		4	
North America and the Caribbean		1	
South and Central America		3	
Oceania		0 or 1 (Note: The continental confederation of Oceania does not have a direct compulsory place for a confederational qualification event, therefore, the Oceanian confederation is invited to participate in the Asian qualification events. The compulsory place is awarded to Oceania if the representative from Oceania is ranked 5th or higher in the Asian qualification. If Oceania fails to rank 5th or does not participate, the IHF Council will award this place as a free wild card.)	Place allocated to Oceania or an additional free wild card
Wild card	1 or 2 (Note: If the teams representing Oceania fail to finish in the top 5 of the Asian Championship or does not participate, the IHF Council will change Oceania's spot into a second wild card.)		
Total	32		

== Summary ==
=== Summary of qualification process ===
The World Championship host will be directly qualified, along with the reigning world champions. In regards to the 12 performance spots, and based on the results of the 2023 Men's World Championship, Europe receives 10 more spots, while Africa and South and Central America takes 1.

Map of each IHF federation.
Detailed summary of qualification process
Confederation	Direct slots	Teams started	Teams eliminated	Teams qualified	Percentage of entered teams with spots in finals	Qualifying start date	Qualifying end date
AHF	4+1	14 (Note: Excluding Oceanian representative Australia.)	9	4+1	26.67%	15 January 2026	29 January 2026
CAHB	5	16	11	5	31.25%	21 January 2026	31 January 2026
EHF (Note: There are two ways of qualifying from Europe, via the European Championship or European qualification)	14+1+1	36	20	14+1+1	44.4%	29 October 2025	17 May 2026
NACHC	1	4	3	1	25%	12 May 2026	16 May 2026
OCHF (Note: The Asian Championship acts as qualification for the Oceanian teams.)	0 or 1	1 (Note: Australia, who is the only Oceanian who entered, participates in the Asian Championship to decides their qualification.)	1	0	6.25%	11 January 2024	25 January 2024
SCAHC	4	6	2	4	67%	19 January 2026	24 January 2026
Total	29	78	46	27+1+2		29 October 2025	16 May 2026

=== Summary of qualified teams ===
Competition	Dates	Host	Vacancies	Qualified
Host nations	28 February 2020	(Egypt) Cairo	1	Germany
2025 World Championship	14 January – 2 February 2025	Croatia; Denmark; Norway	1	Denmark
2026 Asian Men's Handball Championship	15–29 January 2026	Kuwait	4	Bahrain; Japan; Kuwait; Qatar
2026 European Men's Handball Championship	15 January – 1 February 2026	Denmark; Norway; Sweden	4	Croatia; Iceland; Portugal; Sweden
2026 South and Central American Men's Handball Championship	19–24 January 2026	Paraguay	4	Argentina; Brazil; Chile; Uruguay
2026 African Men's Handball Championship	21–31 January 2026	Rwanda	5	Algeria; Angola; Cape Verde; Egypt; Tunisia
2026 Nor.Ca. Men's Handball Championship	12–16 May 2026	United States	1	United States
European qualification	29 October 2025 – 17 May 2026	Various	10	France; Faroe Islands; Greece; Italy; North Macedonia; Norway; Poland; Serbia; Slovenia; Spain
Oceania			—^{[1]}	
Wild card	18 October 2018	(Qatar) Doha	2^{[2]}	Saudi Arabia; Turkey

1. If countries from Oceania (Australia or New Zealand) participating in the Asian Championships finish within the top 5, they would have qualified for the World Championships. As they finished sixth or lower, the place was transferred to the wild card spot.

2. To bear in mind the 2028 Summer Olympics, the IHF Council will award the United States wild cards for the 2025 and 2027 World Championships, if they reach a certain performance level.

== World Championship ==
World champion directly qualified for 2025 edition. Denmark won the 2025 World Championship and became the first team to qualify.

Rank	Team
1st place, gold medalist(s)	Denmark
2nd place, silver medalist(s)	Croatia
3rd place, bronze medalist(s)	France
4	Portugal
5	Egypt
6	Germany
7	Brazil
8	Hungary
9	Iceland
10	Norway
11	Switzerland
12	Netherlands
13	Slovenia
14	Sweden
15	North Macedonia
16	Italy
17	Austria
18	Spain
19	Czech Republic
20	Argentina
21	Qatar
22	Tunisia
23	Cape Verde
24	Chile
25	Poland
26	United States
27	Kuwait
28	Japan
29	Bahrain
30	Algeria
31	Guinea
32	Cuba

== Asia ==
Sixteen teams competed in the Asian Championship, held in Sabah Al-Salem, Kuwait, from 15 to 29 January 2026. The top 4 reached the world championship. Since the Oceanian representative, Australia, failed to make the top 5 of the championship, Oceania's spot was made into a second wildcard. Bahrain, Kuwait, Japan and Qatar reached the world championship.

Group I

Pos	Team	Pld	Pts
1	Japan	3	5
2	Kuwait (H)	3	4
3	South Korea	3	3
4	Iraq	3	0

Source: IHF
(H) Hosts
Group II

Pos	Team	Pld	Pts
1	Qatar	3	4
2	Bahrain	3	4
3	Saudi Arabia	3	4
4	United Arab Emirates	3	0

Source: IHF

=== Bracket ===
Semi-finals
27 January
Japan	25
Bahrain	35
27 January
Qatar (ET)	27
Kuwait	26

Final
29 January
Bahrain (ET)	29
Qatar	26
Third place
29 January
Japan	32
Kuwait	33

=== Final ranking ===
Pos	Team	Pld	W	D	L	GF	GA	GD	Pts	Final result
1	Bahrain	8	7	0	1	254	190	+64	14	Champions and qualified for 2027 World Championship
2	Qatar	7	4	0	3	196	178	+18	8	Runners-up and qualified for 2027 World Championship
3	Kuwait (H)	8	6	0	2	258	189	+69	12	Third place and qualified for 2027 World Championship
4	Japan	8	4	1	3	237	226	+11	9	Fourth place and qualified for 2027 World Championship
5	South Korea	6	4	1	1	178	170	+8	9	Fifth place game
6	Saudi Arabia	7	5	0	2	205	174	+31	10	Fifth place game
7	Iraq	7	3	0	4	184	207	−23	6	Seventh place game
8	United Arab Emirates	7	2	0	5	196	197	−1	4	Seventh place game
9	China	7	5	0	2	215	182	+33	10	Ninth place game
10	Hong Kong	6	2	1	3	162	190	−28	5	Ninth place game
11	Jordan	6	2	0	4	132	136	−4	4	Eleventh place game
12	Iran	7	3	0	4	189	143	+46	6	Eleventh place game
13	Oman	5	1	1	3	127	145	−18	3	Thirteenth place game
14	Australia	7	1	0	6	163	253	−90	2	Thirteenth place game
15	India	6	0	0	6	123	239	−116	0	Fifteenth place

Source: IHF
Rules for classification: 1) points; 2) head-to-head points; 3) head-to-head goal difference; 4) head-to-head number of goals scored; 5) goal difference.
(H) Hosts

== Africa ==
Sixteen teams competed in the African Championship, held in Kigali, Rwanda, from 21 to 31 January 2026. The top five from the championship qualified. Those teams ended up being Algeria, Angola, Cape Verde, Egypt and Tunisia.

Group I

Pos	Team	Pld	Pts
1	Egypt	3	6
2	Algeria	3	2
3	Nigeria	3	2
4	Angola	3	2

Source: IHF
Group II

Pos	Team	Pld	Pts
1	Tunisia	3	5
2	Cape Verde	3	4
3	Morocco	3	3
4	Guinea	3	0

Source: IHF

=== Bracket ===
Semi-finals
29 January
Egypt	32
Cape Verde	26
29 January
Algeria	24
Tunisia	33

Final
31 January
Egypt	37
Tunisia	24
Third place
31 January
Cape Verde	29
Algeria	23

5–8th place bracket

5–8th place semfinals
29 January
Nigeria	30
Guinea	28
29 January
Angola	27
Morocco	20

Fifth place
30 January
Nigeria	20
Angola	25
Seventh place
30 January
Guinea	33 (4)
Morocco (pen)	33 (5)

=== Final ranking ===
Pos	Team	Pld	W	D	L	GF	GA	GD	Pts	Final result
1	Egypt	7	7	0	0	290	166	+124	14	Champions
2	Tunisia	7	5	1	1	238	183	+55	11	Runners-up
3	Cape Verde	7	5	0	2	224	197	+27	10	Third place
4	Algeria	7	3	0	4	208	197	+11	6	Fourth place
5	Angola	7	5	0	2	199	174	+25	10	Fifth place game
6	Nigeria	7	4	0	3	187	189	−2	8	Fifth place game
7	Morocco	7	4	1	2	244	211	+33	9	Seventh place game
8	Guinea	7	2	0	5	201	231	−30	4	Seventh place game
9	Gabon	7	5	0	2	216	175	+41	10	Ninth place game
10	Cameroon	7	4	0	3	194	194	0	8	Ninth place game
11	Congo	7	3	1	3	206	204	+2	7	Eleventh place game
12	Rwanda (H)	7	3	0	4	202	210	−8	6	Eleventh place game
13	Benin	7	2	1	4	203	226	−23	5	Thirteenth place game
14	Zambia	7	1	0	6	156	245	−89	2	Thirteenth place game
15	Kenya	7	1	0	6	185	239	−54	2	Fifteenth place game
16	Uganda	7	0	0	7	155	267	−112	0	Fifteenth place game

Source: IHF
Rules for classification: 1) points; 2) head-to-head points; 3) head-to-head goal difference; 4) head-to-head number of goals scored; 5) goal difference.
(H) Hosts

== Europe ==
24 teams competed in the European Championship, Held in Denmark, Norway, and Sweden, from 15 January to 1 February 2026. The top four from the championship qualified. Those teams ended up being Croatia, Iceland, Portugal and Sweden. Denmark and Germany qualified automatically as the defending champions and hosts, respectively.

Group I

Pos	Team	Pld	Pts
1	Denmark (H)	5	8
2	Germany	5	8
3	Portugal	5	5
4	France	5	4
5	Norway (H)	5	3
6	Spain	5	2

Source: EHF
(H) Hosts
Group II

Pos	Team	Pld	Pts
1	Croatia	5	8
2	Iceland	5	7
3	Sweden (H)	5	7
4	Slovenia	5	4
5	Hungary	5	2
6	Switzerland	5	2

Source: EHF
(H) Hosts

=== Bracket ===
Semi-finals
30 January
Denmark	31
Iceland	28
30 January
Croatia	28
Germany	31

Final
1 February
Denmark	34
Germany	27
Third place
1 February
Iceland	33
Croatia	34

=== European qualification ===
From October 2025 to May 2026, the EHF organised a separate qualification for 10 places.

=== Bracket ===
The draw took place on 31 January 2026 in Herning.

Team 1	Agg.	Team 2	1st leg	2nd leg
Slovakia	47–69	North Macedonia	24–31	23–38
Bosnia and Herzegovina	50–57	Faroe Islands	22–24	28–33
Czech Republic	57–73	France	26–37	31–36
Switzerland	63–67	Italy	32–29	31–38
Greece	67–60	Netherlands	29–27	38–33
Serbia	61–60	Hungary	31–29	30–31
Spain	68–56	Israel	32–27	36–29
Montenegro	57–60	Slovenia	28–29	29–31
Norway	80–60	Turkey	43–30	37–30
Austria	55–56	Poland	25–26	30–30

== North America and Caribbean ==
The championship was held from 12 to 16 May 2024 in Bettendorf, United States where the winner secures the regional ticket. USA were victorious and qualified for the World Championship.

Pos	Team	Pld	W	D	L	GF	GA	GD	Pts	Qualification
1	United States (H)	3	3	0	0	100	68	+32	6	Final
2	Greenland	3	2	0	1	99	79	+20	4	Final
3	Canada	3	1	0	2	60	93	−33	2	Third place match
4	Mexico	3	0	0	3	71	90	−19	0	Third place match

Source: IHF
Rules for classification: 1) points; 2) head-to-head points; 3) head-to-head goal difference; 4) head-to-head number of goals scored; 5) goal difference.
(H) Hosts

=== Final ===
16 May 2026; 15:45	United States	32–18	Greenland	TBK Bank Sports Complex, Bettendorf; Attendance: 500; Referees: Bíró, Kiss (HUN)
16 May 2026; 15:45	Hueter 6	(13–10)	Høegh, Jensen 3	TBK Bank Sports Complex, Bettendorf; Attendance: 500; Referees: Bíró, Kiss (HUN)
16 May 2026; 15:45	2× (suspension)	Report	1× (yellow card) 2× (suspension)	TBK Bank Sports Complex, Bettendorf; Attendance: 500; Referees: Bíró, Kiss (HUN)

== South and Central America ==
Six teams in the South and Central American Championship, Held at the SND Arena in Asunción, Paraguay, from 19 to 24 January 2026. The top four from the championship qualified. Argentina, Brazil, Chile, and Uruguay would finish in top four and advance to the world championship.

Pos	Team	Pld	W	D	L	GF	GA	GD	Pts	Qualification
1st place, gold medalist(s)	Argentina	5	5	0	0	192	98	+94	10	2027 World Championship
2nd place, silver medalist(s)	Brazil	5	4	0	1	198	104	+94	8	2027 World Championship
3rd place, bronze medalist(s)	Chile	5	3	0	2	160	134	+26	6	2027 World Championship
4	Uruguay	5	2	0	3	131	149	−18	4	2027 World Championship
5	Paraguay (H)	5	1	0	4	131	181	−50	2	
6	Peru	5	0	0	5	90	236	−146	0	

Source: IHF
Rules for classification: 1) points; 2) head-to-head points; 3) head-to-head goal difference; 4) head-to-head number of goals scored; 5) goal difference.
(H) Hosts

== Wildcards ==
After no Oceanian team achieved a top 5 finish in the Asian Championship, two wildcards were given out. The IHF received 13 applications. Below are the confirmed applicants.

- Austria
- Hungary
- Saudi Arabia
- South Korea
- Switzerland
- Turkey

On 9 June 2026, the IHF decided to award the wildcards spots to Saudi Arabia and Turkey. Both sides were awarded the wildcards based off their "broader contribution of the national federations to the growth and visibility of the sport, as well as focusing on the development of handball throughout the globe".

=== Quotes ===
"This success is a strong message that Turkish handball gives to the world. We are proud and happy to experience another first in the history of Turkish handball. The development we have made from the lower age categories to the A national teams and the successful results we have achieved in international organizations are now clearly seen by the world handball public. The fact that we have the right to directly participate in the World Championship is the most concrete indicator of this."

— Mesut Çebi, president of the Turkish Handball Federation.
