= 2027 World Men's Handball Championship – European qualification =

The European qualification for the 2027 World Men's Handball Championship was contested in two rounds between October 2025 and May 2026. They joined the two already qualified teams: Germany and Denmark.

== Format ==
In the first round of qualification, six teams were drawn in to knock-out ties. The winners advanced to the qualification phase 2.

All times listed are CET/CEST.

== Qualification phase 1 ==
The draw took place on 26 June 2025. The winners of each tie advanced to phase 2.

=== Seeding ===
The seeding was announced on 24 June 2025.

| Pot 1 | Pot 2 |
|---|---|
| Turkey; Luxembourg; Kosovo | Latvia; Cyprus; Great Britain |

=== Overview ===
| Team 1 | Agg. | Team 2 | 1st leg | 2nd leg |
|---|---|---|---|---|
| Latvia | 62–53 | Luxembourg | 28–20 | 34–33 |
| Cyprus | 46–68 | Turkey | 27–33 | 19–35 |
| Great Britain | 56–67 | Kosovo | 26–32 | 30–35 |

==== Matches ====
| 1 November 2025; 20:00 | Latvia | 28–20 | Luxembourg | d'Coque, Luxembourg City, Luxembourg; Attendance: 773; Referees: Bozhinovski, Nachevski (MKD) |
| 1 November 2025; 20:00 | J. Valkovskis 9 | (13–9) | D. Etute 7 | d'Coque, Luxembourg City, Luxembourg; Attendance: 773; Referees: Bozhinovski, Nachevski (MKD) |
| 1 November 2025; 20:00 | 1× (yellow card) 3× (suspension) | Report | 3× (suspension) | d'Coque, Luxembourg City, Luxembourg; Attendance: 773; Referees: Bozhinovski, Nachevski (MKD) |

| 2 November 2025; 18:30 | Luxembourg | 33–34 | Latvia | d'Coque, Luxembourg City; Attendance: 813; Referees: Bozhinovski, Nachevski (MKD) |
| 2 November 2025; 18:30 | S. Etute 11 | (16–15) | Kušners 8 | d'Coque, Luxembourg City; Attendance: 813; Referees: Bozhinovski, Nachevski (MKD) |
| 2 November 2025; 18:30 | 1× (yellow card) 4× (suspension) | Report | 5× (suspension) | d'Coque, Luxembourg City; Attendance: 813; Referees: Bozhinovski, Nachevski (MKD) |

Latvia won 62–53 on aggregate.

| 29 October 2025; 19:00 | Cyprus | 27–33 | Turkey | Eleftheria Indoor Hall, Nicosia; Attendance: 680; Referees: Horváth, Marton (HUN) |
| 29 October 2025; 19:00 | Argyrou 9 | (14–16) | Pehlivan 7 | Eleftheria Indoor Hall, Nicosia; Attendance: 680; Referees: Horváth, Marton (HUN) |
| 29 October 2025; 19:00 | 1× (yellow card) 4× (suspension) | Report | 1× (yellow card) 6× (suspension) | Eleftheria Indoor Hall, Nicosia; Attendance: 680; Referees: Horváth, Marton (HUN) |

| 2 November 2025; 14:00 | Turkey | 35–19 | Cyprus | Ahmet Aytar Spor Salonu, Elazığ; Attendance: 2,200; Referees: Sirbu, Serdiuc (MDA) |
| 2 November 2025; 14:00 | Biçer 6 | (22–10) | Paraskeva 4 | Ahmet Aytar Spor Salonu, Elazığ; Attendance: 2,200; Referees: Sirbu, Serdiuc (MDA) |
| 2 November 2025; 14:00 | 2× (suspension) | Report | 3× (suspension) | Ahmet Aytar Spor Salonu, Elazığ; Attendance: 2,200; Referees: Sirbu, Serdiuc (MDA) |

Turkey won 68–46 on aggregate.

| 29 October 2025; 18:00 | Great Britain | 26–32 | Kosovo | Derby Arena, Derby; Attendance: 1,508; Referees: Čerņavskis, Bogdanovs (LAT) |
| 29 October 2025; 18:00 | Pereira 5 | (11–15) | Gegaj 9 | Derby Arena, Derby; Attendance: 1,508; Referees: Čerņavskis, Bogdanovs (LAT) |
| 29 October 2025; 18:00 | 1× (yellow card) 3× (suspension) | Report | 1× (yellow card) 3× (suspension) | Derby Arena, Derby; Attendance: 1,508; Referees: Čerņavskis, Bogdanovs (LAT) |

| 2 November 2025; 17:15 | Kosovo | 35–30 | Great Britain | Palace of Youth and Sports, Pristina; Attendance: 1,000; Referees: Leszczyński, Piechota (POL) |
| 2 November 2025; 17:15 | Tahirukaj 7 | (17–13) | Pereira 6 | Palace of Youth and Sports, Pristina; Attendance: 1,000; Referees: Leszczyński, Piechota (POL) |
| 2 November 2025; 17:15 | 4× (suspension) | Report | 3× (suspension) 1× (red card) | Palace of Youth and Sports, Pristina; Attendance: 1,000; Referees: Leszczyński, Piechota (POL) |

Kosovo won 67–56 on aggregate.

== Qualification phase 2 ==
The three winners from phase 1 and 13 other countries played in March 2026 for qualification for phase 3. The draw took place on 6 November 2025. The winners of each tie advanced to phase 3.

=== Seeding ===
The seeding was announced on 5 November 2025.

| Pot 1 | Pot 2 |
|---|---|
| Greece; Bosnia and Herzegovina; Serbia; Romania; Ukraine; Montenegro; Georgia; Poland | Slovakia; Lithuania; Belgium; Finland; Israel; Kosovo; Turkey; Latvia |

=== Overview ===
| Team 1 | Agg. | Team 2 | 1st leg | 2nd leg |
|---|---|---|---|---|
| Bosnia and Herzegovina | 63–54 | Kosovo | 34–21 | 29–33 |
| Georgia | 59–60 | Israel | 29–32 | 30–28 |
| Ukraine | 56–58 | Slovakia | 24–27 | 32–31 |
| Serbia | 75–49 | Lithuania | 42–25 | 33–24 |
| Latvia | 49–66 | Poland | 24–33 | 25–33 |
| Turkey | 69–68 | Romania | 32–37 | 37–31 |
| Greece | 63–57 | Belgium | 29–26 | 34–31 |
| Finland | 58–66 | Montenegro | 32–36 | 26–30 |

==== Matches ====
| 19 March 2026; 20:00 | Bosnia and Herzegovina | 34–21 | Kosovo | KSPC Mejdan, Tuzla; Attendance: 1,400; Referees: Bíró, Kiss (HUN) |
| 19 March 2026; 20:00 | Grgić 8 | (15–13) | Tahirukaj 6 | KSPC Mejdan, Tuzla; Attendance: 1,400; Referees: Bíró, Kiss (HUN) |
| 19 March 2026; 20:00 | 1× (yellow card) 3× (suspension) | Report | 1× (suspension) | KSPC Mejdan, Tuzla; Attendance: 1,400; Referees: Bíró, Kiss (HUN) |

| 22 March 2026; 17:00 | Kosovo | 33–29 | Bosnia and Herzegovina | Palace of Youth and Sports, Pristina; Attendance: 1,035; Referees: Gasmi, Gasmi (FRA) |
| 22 March 2026; 17:00 | Ramosaj 7 | (17–15) | Grgić, Šahinović 6 | Palace of Youth and Sports, Pristina; Attendance: 1,035; Referees: Gasmi, Gasmi (FRA) |
| 22 March 2026; 17:00 | 1× (yellow card) 5× (suspension) | Report | 5× (suspension) | Palace of Youth and Sports, Pristina; Attendance: 1,035; Referees: Gasmi, Gasmi (FRA) |

Bosnia and Herzegovina won 63–54 on aggregate.

| 19 March 2026; 15:00 | Georgia | 29–32 | Israel | Telavi Handball Arena, Telavi; Attendance: 1,050; Referees: Fabryczny, Rawicki (POL) |
| 19 March 2026; 15:00 | Tskhovrebadze 12 | (16–15) | Nizri 8 | Telavi Handball Arena, Telavi; Attendance: 1,050; Referees: Fabryczny, Rawicki (POL) |
| 19 March 2026; 15:00 | 1× (yellow card) 3× (suspension) | Report | 1× (yellow card) 5× (suspension) | Telavi Handball Arena, Telavi; Attendance: 1,050; Referees: Fabryczny, Rawicki (POL) |

| 21 March 2026; 15:00 | Israel | 28–30 | Georgia | Telavi Handball Arena, Telavi, Georgia (Note: Due to the Gaza war, the Israeli team plays their home matches at neutral venues.); Attendance: 950; Referees: Fabryczny, Rawicki (POL) |
| 21 March 2026; 15:00 | Dayan 7 | (13–12) | Tskhovrebadze 8 | Telavi Handball Arena, Telavi, Georgia; Attendance: 950; Referees: Fabryczny, Rawicki (POL) |
| 21 March 2026; 15:00 | 4× (suspension) | Report | 1× (yellow card) 5× (suspension) | Telavi Handball Arena, Telavi, Georgia; Attendance: 950; Referees: Fabryczny, Rawicki (POL) |

Israel won 60–59 on aggregate.

| 18 March 2026; 19:30 | Ukraine | 24–27 | Slovakia | Weststadthalle, Bensheim, Germany (Note: Due to the Russian invasion of Ukraine, the Ukrainian team plays their home matches at neutral venues.); Attendance: 688; Referees: Schulze, Tönnies (GER) |
| 18 March 2026; 19:30 | Turchenko 11 | (11–16) | Briatka 7 | Weststadthalle, Bensheim, Germany; Attendance: 688; Referees: Schulze, Tönnies (GER) |
| 18 March 2026; 19:30 | 3× (suspension) | Report | 5× (suspension) | Weststadthalle, Bensheim, Germany; Attendance: 688; Referees: Schulze, Tönnies (GER) |

| 22 March 2026; 13:00 | Slovakia | 31–32 | Ukraine | Športová Hala MŠK Považská Bystrica, Považská Bystrica; Attendance: 1,500; Referees: Pavićević, Ražnatović (MNE) |
| 22 March 2026; 13:00 | Briatka 8 | (15–20) | Turchenko 8 | Športová Hala MŠK Považská Bystrica, Považská Bystrica; Attendance: 1,500; Referees: Pavićević, Ražnatović (MNE) |
| 22 March 2026; 13:00 | 4× (suspension) | Report | 1× (yellow card) 4× (suspension) | Športová Hala MŠK Považská Bystrica, Považská Bystrica; Attendance: 1,500; Referees: Pavićević, Ražnatović (MNE) |

Slovakia won 58–56 on aggregate.

| 19 March 2026; 18:00 | Serbia | 42–25 | Lithuania | Čair Sports Center, Niš; Attendance: 4,800; Referees: Pîrvu, Potîrniche (ROU) |
| 19 March 2026; 18:00 | Pechmalbec 10 | (21–12) | Dumčius, Urvikis 5 | Čair Sports Center, Niš; Attendance: 4,800; Referees: Pîrvu, Potîrniche (ROU) |
| 19 March 2026; 18:00 | 3× (suspension) | Report | 2× (suspension) | Čair Sports Center, Niš; Attendance: 4,800; Referees: Pîrvu, Potîrniche (ROU) |

| 22 March 2026; 14:10 | Lithuania | 24–33 | Serbia | Utena Arena, Utena; Attendance: 1,200; Referees: Kull, Tint (EST) |
| 22 March 2026; 14:10 | Urvikis 6 | (10–15) | Ðukić 7 | Utena Arena, Utena; Attendance: 1,200; Referees: Kull, Tint (EST) |
| 22 March 2026; 14:10 | 1× (yellow card) 3× (suspension) | Report | 1× (red card) | Utena Arena, Utena; Attendance: 1,200; Referees: Kull, Tint (EST) |

Serbia won 75–49 on aggregate.

| 19 March 2026; 18:40 | Latvia | 24–33 | Poland | Zemgale Olympic Center, Jelgava; Attendance: 890; Referees: Lončar, Lončar (CRO) |
| 19 March 2026; 18:40 | Valkovskis 6 | (12–17) | Czapliński 10 | Zemgale Olympic Center, Jelgava; Attendance: 890; Referees: Lončar, Lončar (CRO) |
| 19 March 2026; 18:40 | 4× (suspension) | Report | 1× (yellow card) 6× (suspension) | Zemgale Olympic Center, Jelgava; Attendance: 890; Referees: Lončar, Lončar (CRO) |

| 22 March 2026; 15:00 | Poland | 33–25 | Latvia | Arena Ostrów, Ostrów Wielkopolski; Attendance: 2,152; Referees: Jović, Arnautović (BIH) |
| 22 March 2026; 15:00 | Czapliński, Tomczak 6 | (15–18) | Kalniņš 7 | Arena Ostrów, Ostrów Wielkopolski; Attendance: 2,152; Referees: Jović, Arnautović (BIH) |
| 22 March 2026; 15:00 | 9× (suspension) | Report | 4× (suspension) | Arena Ostrów, Ostrów Wielkopolski; Attendance: 2,152; Referees: Jović, Arnautović (BIH) |

Poland won 66–49 on aggregate.

| 19 March 2026; 14:00 | Turkey | 32–37 | Romania | Karaçayır Kapalı Spor Salonu, Bolu; Attendance: 2,500; Referees: Álvarez, Bustamante (ESP) |
| 19 March 2026; 14:00 | Pehlivan 8 | (15–19) | Buzle 8 | Karaçayır Kapalı Spor Salonu, Bolu; Attendance: 2,500; Referees: Álvarez, Bustamante (ESP) |
| 19 March 2026; 14:00 | 2× (suspension) | Report | 5× (suspension) | Karaçayır Kapalı Spor Salonu, Bolu; Attendance: 2,500; Referees: Álvarez, Bustamante (ESP) |

| 22 March 2026; 18:00 | Romania | 31–37 | Turkey | Romeo Iamandi Sports Hall, Buzău; Attendance: 2,000; Referees: Hansen, Madsen (DEN) |
| 22 March 2026; 18:00 | Radu, Rață 5 | (16–21) | Pehlivan, Yıldız 10 | Romeo Iamandi Sports Hall, Buzău; Attendance: 2,000; Referees: Hansen, Madsen (DEN) |
| 22 March 2026; 18:00 | 1× (suspension) | Report | 1× (yellow card) 1× (suspension) | Romeo Iamandi Sports Hall, Buzău; Attendance: 2,000; Referees: Hansen, Madsen (DEN) |

Turkey won 69–68 on aggregate.

| 18 March 2026; 16:00 | Greece | 29–26 | Belgium | Tasos Kampouris Kanithou Indoor Hall, Chalcis; Attendance: 1,000; Referees: Martins, Martins (POR) |
| 18 March 2026; 16:00 | Toskas 8 | (16–13) | Kotters 13 | Tasos Kampouris Kanithou Indoor Hall, Chalcis; Attendance: 1,000; Referees: Martins, Martins (POR) |
| 18 March 2026; 16:00 | 3× (suspension) | Report | 2× (suspension) | Tasos Kampouris Kanithou Indoor Hall, Chalcis; Attendance: 1,000; Referees: Martins, Martins (POR) |

| 21 March 2026; 18:00 | Belgium | 31–34 | Greece | Sporthal Alverberg, Hasselt; Attendance: 1,364; Referees: Marín, García (ESP) |
| 21 March 2026; 18:00 | three players 5 | (17–19) | Boskos, Toskas 7 | Sporthal Alverberg, Hasselt; Attendance: 1,364; Referees: Marín, García (ESP) |
| 21 March 2026; 18:00 | 1× (yellow card) 3× (suspension) | Report | 2× (yellow card) 3× (suspension) | Sporthal Alverberg, Hasselt; Attendance: 1,364; Referees: Marín, García (ESP) |

Greece won 63–57 on aggregate.

| 19 March 2026; 17:30 | Finland | 32–36 | Montenegro | Energia Areena, Vantaa; Attendance: 1,380; Referees: Elíasson, Pálsson (ISL) |
| 19 March 2026; 17:30 | Granlund 7 | (13–16) | Čepić, Vujović 8 | Energia Areena, Vantaa; Attendance: 1,380; Referees: Elíasson, Pálsson (ISL) |
| 19 March 2026; 17:30 | 1× (yellow card) 4× (suspension) | Report | 1× (yellow card) 3× (suspension) | Energia Areena, Vantaa; Attendance: 1,380; Referees: Elíasson, Pálsson (ISL) |

| 22 March 2026; 18:00 | Montenegro | 30–27 | Finland | Bemax Arena, Podgorica; Attendance: 2,100; Referees: Jørum, Kleven (NOR) |
| 22 March 2026; 18:00 | three players 5 | (16–13) | Helander, Henriksson 4 | Bemax Arena, Podgorica; Attendance: 2,100; Referees: Jørum, Kleven (NOR) |
| 22 March 2026; 18:00 | 1× (suspension) | Report | 1× (suspension) | Bemax Arena, Podgorica; Attendance: 2,100; Referees: Jørum, Kleven (NOR) |

Montenegro won 66–58 on aggregate.

== Qualification phase 3 ==
Phase 3 took place from 13 to 17 May 2026. The draw took place on 31 January 2026. Eight winners from Phase 2 and the remaining 12 teams from the 2026 European Men's Handball Championship joined.

=== Seeding ===
The seeding was announced on 30 January 2026.

| Pot 1 | Pot 2 |
|---|---|
| France; Slovenia; Norway; Hungary; Spain; Switzerland; Faroe Islands; North Macedonia; Netherlands; Austria | Czech Republic; Italy; Bosnia and Herzegovina; Israel; Slovakia; Serbia; Poland; Turkey; Greece; Montenegro |

=== Overview ===
| Team 1 | Agg. | Team 2 | 1st leg | 2nd leg |
|---|---|---|---|---|
| Slovakia | 47–69 | North Macedonia | 24–31 | 23–38 |
| Bosnia and Herzegovina | 50–57 | Faroe Islands | 22–24 | 28–33 |
| Czech Republic | 57–73 | France | 26–37 | 31–36 |
| Switzerland | 63–67 | Italy | 32–29 | 31–38 |
| Greece | 67–60 | Netherlands | 29–27 | 38–33 |
| Serbia | 61–60 | Hungary | 31–29 | 30–31 |
| Spain | 68–56 | Israel | 32–27 | 36–29 |
| Montenegro | 57–60 | Slovenia | 28–29 | 29–31 |
| Norway | 80–60 | Turkey | 43–30 | 37–30 |
| Austria | 55–56 | Poland | 25–26 | 30–30 |

==== Matches ====
| 14 May 2026; 19:00 | Slovakia | 24–31 | North Macedonia | Tatran Handball Arena, Prešov; Attendance: 3,024; Referees: Novykoy (UKR), Gatelis ( LTU) |
| 14 May 2026; 19:00 | Briatka, Macháč 4 | (13–18) | Kuzmanovski 10 | Tatran Handball Arena, Prešov; Attendance: 3,024; Referees: Novykoy (UKR), Gatelis ( LTU) |
| 14 May 2026; 19:00 | 1× (yellow card) 3× (suspension) | Report | 3× (suspension) | Tatran Handball Arena, Prešov; Attendance: 3,024; Referees: Novykoy (UKR), Gatelis ( LTU) |

| 17 May 2026; 19:00 | North Macedonia | 38–23 | Slovakia | Boris Trajkovski Sports Center, Skopje; Attendance: 6,000; Referees: Leszczyński, Piechota (POL) |
| 17 May 2026; 19:00 | Kuzmanovski 11 | (18–11) | Prokop 7 | Boris Trajkovski Sports Center, Skopje; Attendance: 6,000; Referees: Leszczyński, Piechota (POL) |
| 17 May 2026; 19:00 | 1× (yellow card) 1× (suspension) | Report | 1× (yellow card) 2× (suspension) | Boris Trajkovski Sports Center, Skopje; Attendance: 6,000; Referees: Leszczyński, Piechota (POL) |

North Macedonia won 69–47 on aggregate.

| 14 May 2026; 20:00 | Bosnia and Herzegovina | 22–24 | Faroe Islands | KSPC Mejdan, Tuzla; Attendance: 2,353; Referees: Bolic, Hurich (AUT) |
| 14 May 2026; 20:00 | Čolaković 7 | (10–12) | West Av Teigum 11 | KSPC Mejdan, Tuzla; Attendance: 2,353; Referees: Bolic, Hurich (AUT) |
| 14 May 2026; 20:00 | 2× (suspension) 1× (red card) | Report | 2× (suspension) | KSPC Mejdan, Tuzla; Attendance: 2,353; Referees: Bolic, Hurich (AUT) |

| 16 May 2026; 20:00 | Faroe Islands | 33–28 | Bosnia and Herzegovina | Við Tjarnir, Tórshavn; Attendance: 3,000; Referees: Budzák, Záhradník (SVK) |
| 16 May 2026; 20:00 | West Av Teigum 11 | (15–17) | Šahinović 10 | Við Tjarnir, Tórshavn; Attendance: 3,000; Referees: Budzák, Záhradník (SVK) |
| 16 May 2026; 20:00 | 1× (yellow card) 4× (suspension) | Report | 1× (yellow card) 5× (suspension) | Við Tjarnir, Tórshavn; Attendance: 3,000; Referees: Budzák, Záhradník (SVK) |

Faroe Island won 57–50 on aggregate.

| 13 May 2026; 20:00 | Czech Republic | 26–37 | France | Winning Group Arena, Brno; Attendance: 4,047; Referees: Mitrevski, Todorovski (MKD) |
| 13 May 2026; 20:00 | Klíma, Piroch 5 | (14–20) | Briet 7 | Winning Group Arena, Brno; Attendance: 4,047; Referees: Mitrevski, Todorovski (MKD) |
| 13 May 2026; 20:00 | 3× (suspension) | Report | 7× (suspension) | Winning Group Arena, Brno; Attendance: 4,047; Referees: Mitrevski, Todorovski (MKD) |

| 17 May 2026; 17:00 | France | 36–31 | Czech Republic | Arena Orléans, Orléans; Attendance: 6,155; Referees: Cindrić, Gonzurek (CRO) |
| 17 May 2026; 17:00 | Richardson 5 | (21–13) | Josef, Piroch 6 | Arena Orléans, Orléans; Attendance: 6,155; Referees: Cindrić, Gonzurek (CRO) |
| 17 May 2026; 17:00 | 3× (suspension) | Report | 1× (yellow card) 3× (suspension) | Arena Orléans, Orléans; Attendance: 6,155; Referees: Cindrić, Gonzurek (CRO) |

France won 73–57 on aggregate.

| 14 May 2026; 19:00 | Switzerland | 32–29 | Italy | Hallenstadion, Zurich; Attendance: 4,850; Referees: Boričić, Marković (SRB) |
| 14 May 2026; 19:00 | Leopold 9 | (16–17) | Helmersson 8 | Hallenstadion, Zurich; Attendance: 4,850; Referees: Boričić, Marković (SRB) |
| 14 May 2026; 19:00 | 1× (yellow card) 6× (suspension) | Report | 1× (yellow card) 3× (suspension) | Hallenstadion, Zurich; Attendance: 4,850; Referees: Boričić, Marković (SRB) |

| 17 May 2026; 18:00 | Italy | 38–31 | Switzerland | Pala Cattani, Faenza; Attendance: 4,000; Referees: Lah, Sok (SLO) |
| 17 May 2026; 18:00 | Dapiran 12 | (20–12) | Leopold 7 | Pala Cattani, Faenza; Attendance: 4,000; Referees: Lah, Sok (SLO) |
| 17 May 2026; 18:00 | 2× (suspension) | Report | 1× (yellow card) 5× (suspension) | Pala Cattani, Faenza; Attendance: 4,000; Referees: Lah, Sok (SLO) |

Italy won 67–63 on aggregate.

| 13 May 2026; 18:30 | Greece | 29–27 | Netherlands | Tasos Kampouris Kanithou Indoor Hall, Chalcis; Attendance: 900; Referees: Peretz, Schwartz (ISR) |
| 13 May 2026; 18:30 | Panagiotou 7 | (14–12) | Nagtegaal 8 | Tasos Kampouris Kanithou Indoor Hall, Chalcis; Attendance: 900; Referees: Peretz, Schwartz (ISR) |
| 13 May 2026; 18:30 | 1× (yellow card) 3× (suspension) 1× (red card) | Report | 4× (suspension) | Tasos Kampouris Kanithou Indoor Hall, Chalcis; Attendance: 900; Referees: Peretz, Schwartz (ISR) |

| 17 May 2026; 15:00 | Netherlands | 33–38 | Greece | Topsportcentrum, Rotterdam; Attendance: 1,800; Referees: Vešović, Mitrović (MNE) |
| 17 May 2026; 15:00 | Nagtegaal 6 | (14–20) | Panagiotou 7 | Topsportcentrum, Rotterdam; Attendance: 1,800; Referees: Vešović, Mitrović (MNE) |
| 17 May 2026; 15:00 | 2× (yellow card) 6× (suspension) | Report | 3× (suspension) 1× (red card) | Topsportcentrum, Rotterdam; Attendance: 1,800; Referees: Vešović, Mitrović (MNE) |

Greece won 67–60 on aggregate.

| 14 May 2026; 18:00 | Serbia | 31–29 | Hungary | Čair Sports Center, Niš; Attendance: 5,200; Referees: Erdoğan, Özdeniz (TUR) |
| 14 May 2026; 18:00 | Pechmalbec 8 | (18–12) | Imre 7 | Čair Sports Center, Niš; Attendance: 5,200; Referees: Erdoğan, Özdeniz (TUR) |
| 14 May 2026; 18:00 | 3× (suspension) | Report | 2× (yellow card) 2× (suspension) | Čair Sports Center, Niš; Attendance: 5,200; Referees: Erdoğan, Özdeniz (TUR) |

| 17 May 2026; 17:30 | Hungary | 31–30 | Serbia | Veszprém Aréna, Veszprém; Referees: Elíasson, Pálsson (ISL) |
| 17 May 2026; 17:30 | Imre 6 | (17–17) | Ilić 9 | Veszprém Aréna, Veszprém; Referees: Elíasson, Pálsson (ISL) |
| 17 May 2026; 17:30 | 1× (yellow card) 2× (suspension) | Report | 1× (yellow card) 4× (suspension) | Veszprém Aréna, Veszprém; Referees: Elíasson, Pálsson (ISL) |

Serbia won 61–60 on aggregate.

| 15 May 2026; 00:00 | Spain | 32–27 | Israel | La Casa del Handball Argentino, Buenos Aires, Argentina (Note: Both teams agreed to play the tie on neutral territory.); Attendance: 850; Referees: Lemes, Sosa (URU) |
| 15 May 2026; 00:00 | Tarrafeta 5 | (18–12) | Dayan 6 | La Casa del Handball Argentino, Buenos Aires, Argentina; Attendance: 850; Referees: Lemes, Sosa (URU) |
| 15 May 2026; 00:00 | 5× (suspension) | Report | 4× (suspension) | La Casa del Handball Argentino, Buenos Aires, Argentina; Attendance: 850; Referees: Lemes, Sosa (URU) |

| 16 May 2026; 20:30 | Israel | 29–36 | Spain | La Casa del Handball Argentino, Buenos Aires, Argentina; Attendance: 1,700; Referees: Lemes, Sosa (URU) |
| 16 May 2026; 20:30 | Nziri, Lumbroso 7 | (13–16) | Fernández 6 | La Casa del Handball Argentino, Buenos Aires, Argentina; Attendance: 1,700; Referees: Lemes, Sosa (URU) |
| 16 May 2026; 20:30 | 5× (suspension) 1× (red card) | Report | 5× (suspension) 1× (red card) | La Casa del Handball Argentino, Buenos Aires, Argentina; Attendance: 1,700; Referees: Lemes, Sosa (URU) |

Spain won 68–56 on aggregate.

| 14 May 2026; 18:00 | Montenegro | 28–29 | Slovenia | Morača Sports Center, Podgorica; Attendance: 4,500; Referees: Horváth, Marton (HUN) |
| 14 May 2026; 18:00 | Ćorsović 7 | (12–16) | Vlah 7 | Morača Sports Center, Podgorica; Attendance: 4,500; Referees: Horváth, Marton (HUN) |
| 14 May 2026; 18:00 | 3× (suspension) | Report | 1× (yellow card) 2× (suspension) | Morača Sports Center, Podgorica; Attendance: 4,500; Referees: Horváth, Marton (HUN) |

| 17 May 2026; 17:00 | Slovenia | 31–29 | Montenegro | Arena Bonifika, Koper; Attendance: 3,090; Referees: Barysas, Petrušis (LTU) |
| 17 May 2026; 17:00 | Vlah 8 | (17–14) | Bakić, Vujović 5 | Arena Bonifika, Koper; Attendance: 3,090; Referees: Barysas, Petrušis (LTU) |
| 17 May 2026; 17:00 | 1× (suspension) | Report | 1× (yellow card) 4× (suspension) | Arena Bonifika, Koper; Attendance: 3,090; Referees: Barysas, Petrušis (LTU) |

Slovenia won 60–57 on aggregate.

| 13 May 2026; 18:00 | Norway | 43–30 | Turkey | Gjøvik Olympic Cavern Hall, Gjøvik; Attendance: 3,650; Referees: Merz, Kuttler (GER) |
| 13 May 2026; 18:00 | Pedersen 10 | (23–20) | Yıldız 9 | Gjøvik Olympic Cavern Hall, Gjøvik; Attendance: 3,650; Referees: Merz, Kuttler (GER) |
| 13 May 2026; 18:00 | 1× (suspension) | Report | 2× (suspension) | Gjøvik Olympic Cavern Hall, Gjøvik; Attendance: 3,650; Referees: Merz, Kuttler (GER) |

| 16 May 2026; 15:00 | Turkey | 30–37 | Norway | THF Sport Hall, Ankara; Attendance: 1,850; Referees: Weijmans, Wolbertus (NED) |
| 16 May 2026; 15:00 | Yıldız 9 | (9–18) | Abelvik Rød 7 | THF Sport Hall, Ankara; Attendance: 1,850; Referees: Weijmans, Wolbertus (NED) |
| 16 May 2026; 15:00 | 1× (suspension) | Report | 2× (suspension) | THF Sport Hall, Ankara; Attendance: 1,850; Referees: Weijmans, Wolbertus (NED) |

Norway won 80–60 on aggregate.

| 13 May 2026; 18:00 | Austria | 25–26 | Poland | Raiffeisen Sportpark, Graz; Attendance: 2,786; Referees: Sekulić, Jovandić (SRB) |
| 13 May 2026; 18:00 | Bilyk 5 | (13–15) | Czapliński 8 | Raiffeisen Sportpark, Graz; Attendance: 2,786; Referees: Sekulić, Jovandić (SRB) |
| 13 May 2026; 18:00 | 1× (yellow card) 2× (suspension) | Report | 7× (suspension) | Raiffeisen Sportpark, Graz; Attendance: 2,786; Referees: Sekulić, Jovandić (SRB) |

| 17 May 2026; 15:00 | Poland | 30–30 | Austria | Hala Urania, Olsztyn; Attendance: 4,030; Referees: Thiyagarajah, Thiyagarajah (GER) |
| 17 May 2026; 15:00 | Jędraszczyk 7 | (13–17) | Herburger 7 | Hala Urania, Olsztyn; Attendance: 4,030; Referees: Thiyagarajah, Thiyagarajah (GER) |
| 17 May 2026; 15:00 | 2× (suspension) | Report | 1× (yellow card) 5× (suspension) | Hala Urania, Olsztyn; Attendance: 4,030; Referees: Thiyagarajah, Thiyagarajah (GER) |

Poland won 56–55 on aggregate.
