= 2027 World Men's Handball Championship =

Handball-Weltmeisterschaft der Männer 2027 (in German)
- Where handball is alive

Tournament details
- Host country: Germany
- Venues: 6 (in 6 host cities)
- Dates: 13–31 January
- Teams: 32 (from 5 confederations)

The 2027 IHF Men's Handball World Championship will be the 30th edition of the IHF World Men's Handball Championship, the biennial international handball championship organised under the aegis of IHF for the men's national teams across the world. The tournament will be held from 13 to 31 January 2027. The championship will be hosted by Germany, with six venues across the country being for the tournament. The final will be held at the Lanxess Arena in Cologne.

For the fourth time, 32 teams will take part, following the expansion in 2021. Continental championships acted as qualification, with the exception of Europe, who also use their own qualification process alongside the European Championship. As hosts, Germany automatically qualified. Qualifiers took place between October 2025 and May 2026. Faroe Islands and Turkey will make their debut, with the former becoming the smallest country to ever qualify, while Greece return after a long absence.

This tournament will act as a qualifier for the 2028 Summer Olympics, as the winners will automatically qualify for the games. Alongside that, six spots in the Olympics qualifying tournaments will be allocated via this event.

Denmark is the four time defending champion, most recently beating Croatia in the 2025 final in Bærum.

== Bidding process ==
Five nations expressed interest in hosting the tournament. The awarding of the events took place at the next IHF Council meeting in Cairo, Egypt, on 28 February 2020.

- Croatia/Denmark/Norway (withdrew, awarded the 2025 edition)
- Hungary (withdrew)
- Germany

At the meeting, Germany was chosen as the host after the other bids withdrew. This will be the eighth time Germany will host this tournament, after 1958 and 1974 as East Germany, 1961 and 1982 as West Germany, and 1938, 2007 and 2019 as a unified country. This marks the first time the event will be held in a single country since 2021.

== Qualification ==
Team qualified Team failed to qualify Team withdrew or suspended Did not enter

The World Championship hosts were directly qualified, along with the reigning world champions. The number of compulsory places awarded to other continental confederation remained unchanged. In regards to the 12 performance spots, and based on the results of the 2025 Men's World Championship, Europe receives 10 more spots, while Africa and South and Central America takes 1.

The slot allocation was as follows:

- AHF (Asia): 4 slots
- CAHB (Africa): 5 slots
- EHF (Europe): 16 slots (including hosts Germany)
- NACHC (North America and the Caribbean): 1 slot
- OCHF (Oceania): 0 slots
- SCAHC (South and Central America): 4 slots
- Wildcards: 2 slots

Detailed summary of qualification process
Confederation	Direct slots	Teams started	Teams eliminated	Teams qualified	Percentage of entered teams with spots in finals	Qualifying start date	Qualifying end date
AHF	4+1	14 (Note: Excluding Oceanian representative Australia.)	10	4	26.67%	15 January 2026	29 January 2026
CAHB	5	16	11	5	31.25%	21 January 2026	31 January 2026
EHF (Note: There are two ways of qualifying from Europe, via the European Championship or European qualification)	14+1+1	36	20	14+1+1	44.4%	29 October 2025	17 May 2026
NACHC	1	4	3	1	25%	12 May 2026	16 May 2026
OCHF (Note: The Asian Championship acts as qualification for the Oceanian teams.)	0 or 1	1 (Note: Australia, who is the only Oceanian who entered, participates in the Asian Championship to decides their qualification.)	1	0	6.25%	11 January 2024	25 January 2024
SCAHC	4	6	2	4	67%	19 January 2026	24 January 2026
Total	29	78	46	27+1+2		29 October 2025	16 May 2026

Qualifying occurred between October 2025 and May 2026. Each region's continental championships acted as world championship qualification, although Europe also has its own qualification process. With the exception of Belarus and Russia, who are banned of the IHF due to the Russian invasion of Ukraine, all remaining IHF member associations were eligible to enter qualification. In total, 78 nations have entered the continental championships and European qualifiers, which act as world championship qualification.

Faroe Islands and Turkey will make their debut, with the former becoming the smallest country to take part at the world championship. Greece will make their return after last appearing in 2005. Angola will come back after last taking part in 2021. Serbia, wildcards Saudi Arabia and Uruguay secured their ticket after missing out in the previous edition. Italy qualify for a second consecutive edition for the first time.

Of the absentees, Hungary failed to advanced for the first time since 2015. Netherlands didn't qualify after being present in the last two championships while Austria, Czech Republic, 2025 debutants Guinea and Switzerland failed to qualify after taking part in 2025. Previous qualifiers Cuba didn't enter qualification.

AHF (4+1)

- Bahrain
- Japan
- Kuwait
- Qatar
- Saudi Arabia ^{WC}

CAHB (5)

- Algeria
- Angola
- Cape Verde
- Egypt
- Tunisia

EHF (Note: There are 2 ways of qualifying from Europe, via the European Championship or European qualification) (16+1)

- Croatia
- Denmark
- France
- Faroe Islands
- Germany (hosts)
- Greece
- Iceland
- Italy
- North Macedonia
- Norway
- Poland
- Portugal
- Serbia
- Slovenia
- Spain
- Sweden
- Turkey ^{WC}

NACHC (1)

- United States

OCHF (0)

- None qualified

SCAHC (4)

- Argentina
- Brazil
- Chile
- Uruguay

=== Wildcards ===
After no Oceanian team achieved a top 5 finish in the Asian Championship, two wildcards were given out.

- Saudi Arabia
- Turkey

On 9 June 2026, the IHF decided, after receiving 13 applications, decided to award the wildcards spots to Saudi Arabia and Turkey. Both sides were awarded the wildcards based off their "broader contribution of the national federations to the growth and visibility of the sport, as well as focusing on the development of handball throughout the globe".

=== Qualified teams ===
Team	Qualification method	Date of qualification	Appearance(s)				Previous best performance (Note: Bold text indicates they hosted that edition.)
Team	Qualification method	Date of qualification	Total	First	Last	Streak	Previous best performance
Germany	Host nation	28 January 2020	29th (Note: From both German teams only East Germany was qualified in 1990.)	1938	2025	15	Champions (1938, 1978, 2007)
Denmark	Defending champions	2 February 2025	27th	1938	2025	13	Champions (2019, 2021, 2023, 2025)
Brazil	Top four at 2026 South and Central American Championship	21 January 2026	18th	1958	2025	17	Seventh place (2025)
Argentina	Top four at 2026 South and Central American Championship	21 January 2026	16th	1997	2025	16	Eleventh place (2021)
Chile	Top four at 2026 South and Central American Championship	24 January 2026	9th	2011	2025	9	16th place (2019)
Uruguay	Top four at 2026 South and Central American Championship	24 January 2026	3rd	2021	2023	1	24th place (2021)
Japan	Semifinalist at 2026 Asian Championship	25 January 2026	17th	1961	2025	2	Tenth place (1970)
Qatar	Semifinalist at 2026 Asian Championship	25 January 2026	11th	2003	2025	8	Runners-up (2015)
Bahrain	Semifinalist at 2026 Asian Championship	25 January 2026	7th	2011	2025	6	16th place (2023)
Kuwait	Semifinalist at 2026 Asian Championship	25 January 2026	10th	1982	2025	2	15th place (1982)
Egypt	Top five at 2026 African Championship	25 January 2026	19th	1964	2025	18	Fourth place (2001)
Cape Verde	Top five at 2026 African Championship	25 January 2026	4th	2021	2025	4	23rd place (2023, 2025)
Algeria	Top five at 2026 African Championship	26 January 2026	18th	1974	2025	4	13th place (2001)
Tunisia	Top five at 2026 African Championship	26 January 2026	18th	1967	2025	17	Fourth place (2005)
Croatia	Top six at 2026 European Championship	28 January 2026	17th	1995	2025	17	Champions (2003)
Iceland	Top six at 2026 European Championship	28 January 2026	24th	1958	2025	9	Fifth place (1997)
Sweden	Top six at 2026 European Championship	28 January 2026	28th	1938	2025	7	Champions (1954, 1958, 1990, 1999)
Portugal	Top six at 2026 European Championship	28 January 2026	7th	1997	2025	4	Fourth place (2025)
Angola	Top five at 2026 African Championship	30 January 2026	6th	2005	2021	1	20th place (2005)
Norway	European playoff winner	16 May 2026	19th	1958	2025	6	Runners-up (2017, 2019)
Faroe Islands	European playoff winner	16 May 2026	Debut				
Spain	European playoff winner	16 May 2026	25th	1958	2025	23	Champions (2005, 2013)
United States	Winner of the 2026 Nor.Ca. Championship	16 May 2026	9th	1964	2025	2	16th place (1964, 1970, 1974, 1993)
Greece	European playoff winner	17 May 2026	2nd	2005	2005	1	Sixth place (2005)
Poland	European playoff winner	17 May 2026	19th	1958	2025	6	Runners-up (2007)
France	European playoff winner	17 May 2026	26th	1954	2025	19	Champions (1995, 2001, 2009, 2011, 2015, 2017)
Slovenia	European playoff winner	17 May 2026	12th	1993	2025	4	Third place (2017)
Serbia	European playoff winner	17 May 2026	21th	1964	2023	1	Champions (1986) (Note: Included Yugoslavia and Serbia and Montenegro results.)
Italy	European playoff winner	17 May 2026	3rd	1997	2025	2	16th place (2025)
North Macedonia	European playoff winner	17 May 2026	10th	1999	2025	8	Ninth place (2015)
Saudi Arabia	Wildcards	9 June 2026	11th	1997	2023	1	19th place (2003, 2013)
Turkey	Wildcards	9 June 2026	1st	Debut			

== Preparations ==
=== Tickets ===
Tickets were released at 12:00 CET on 15 December 2025, after the 2025 World Women's Handball Championship final.

=== Logo unveiling ===
On 3 November 2025, the logo was unveiled. The slogan for the tournament was also announced, with it being "Where handball is alive". Mark Schober, CEO of the German Handball Federation, said the following:

"With the 2027 World Championship, we want to revive the enthusiasm of the Winter Fairytale – with a tournament that inspires sporting excitement, connects emotionally, and showcases handball in all its facets, The arenas are places steeped in handball tradition. They stand for passion, closeness to the fans, and the special atmosphere that makes our sport so unique."

== Venues ==
At the presentation during the IHF Council Meeting in Cairo, Egypt on 27 and 28 February 2020 the bid delegation presented eight venues. Six venues were ultimately announced in October 2024, with the opening match to be played in Munich and the final in Cologne. Andreas Michelmann, the president of the German Handball Federation, said that tradition was behind the venue selection, with places like Hanover, Kiel and Magdeburg being chosen. Berlin, Mannheim, Hamburg, Frankfurt and Leipzig, who were all proposed cities, didn't make the cut. Cologne, Kiel, Magdeburg and Munich have experience hosting the men's world championship, while Stuttgart have experience with the women's edition. Hanover will host a major handball championship for the first time, having originally been part of Germany's bid for the 2024 European Men's Handball Championship before being excluded.

=== Overview of venues ===
- The Lanxess Arena in Cologne is one of the biggest indoor venues in Germany and boasts 19,250 seats. The venue is accustomed to hosting prestigious events, previously organising the 2001, 2010 and 2017 IIHF World Championship and EuroBasket 2022. Handball-wise, it has hosted every EHF Final Four since its inception in 2010.
- The SAP Garden in Munich is a newly built arena, that replaced the Olympiahalle. Housing 11,000 seats, the venue was planned to host the 2024 European Men's Handball Championship but this didn't happen due delays in construction. This will therefore be the first major championship in any sport held in this arena.
- The Wunderino Arena in Kiel, home to powerhouse THW Kiel, will return to hosting a major handball championship. Hosting a capacity of 10,250, the venue previously hosted the 1982 and 2007 World Men's Handball Championship.
- The ZAG-Arena in Hanover will host its first major tournament since the 2001 IIHF World Championship. Being constructed with a capacity of 10,000, it also hosted Expo 2000 and is home to TSV Hannover-Burgdorf.
- The GETEC Arena in Magdeburg is holding a handball championship for the first time since 2007. Home to Champions League winning side, SC Magdeburg, the venue also held the 2023 IHF Men's U21 Handball World Championship.
- The Porsche-Arena in Stuttgart was built in 2006. The venue has hosted the 2007 World Men's Handball Championship, 2015 Rhythmic Gymnastics World Championships and 2025 World Women's Handball Championship.
Germany venues

Cologne	Munich	Kiel
Lanxess Arena	SAP Garden	Wunderino Arena
Capacity: 19,250	Capacity: 11,000	Capacity: 10,250
Hanover	Magdeburg	Stuttgart
ZAG-Arena	GETEC Arena	Porsche-Arena
Capacity: 10,000	Capacity: 6,500	Capacity: 6,200

Tournament venues information
Venue	Rounds	Games
Lanxess Arena	Main round Group II, Group IV and Final round	19
ZAG-Arena	Main round Group I and Group III	18
SAP Garden	Group A and C	12
Porsche-Arena	Group B and D	12
Wunderino Arena	Group E and Group G	12
GETEC Arena	Group F, Group H and Presidents Cup	28

== Draw ==
The draw took place on 10 June 2026 in Munich, Germany.

=== Seeding ===
The seeding was revealed on 9 February 2026. On 19 March 2026, the allocated cities for some teams were announced.

Pot 1	Pot 2	Pot 3	Pot 4
Denmark (assigned to G1); Germany (assigned to A1); Croatia (assigned to C1); Iceland (assigned to H1); Portugal (assigned to F1); Sweden (assigned to E1); Egypt; Argentina	France (assigned to D2); Slovenia; Norway; Serbia; Spain; Italy (assigned to B2); Faroe Islands; North Macedonia	Greece; Poland; Brazil; Bahrain; Tunisia; Cape Verde; Chile; United States	Qatar; Kuwait; Japan; Algeria; Angola; Uruguay; Turkey; Saudi Arabia

== Referees ==
The referee pairs were selected on 30 October 2026.

Referees
Algeria	Youcef Belkhiri; Sid Ali Hamidi
Argentina	Julian Grillo; Sebastián Lenci
Argentina	Mariana García; María Paolantoni
Bosnia and Herzegovina	Amar Konjičanin; Dino Konjičanin
Brazil	Bruna Correa; Renata Correa
Czech Republic	Václav Horáček; Jiří Novotný
Denmark	Mads Hansen; Jesper Madsen
Egypt	Heidy El-Saied; Yasmina El-Saied
France	Karim Gasmi; Raouf Gasmi

Referees
Germany	Robert Schulze; Tobias Tönnies
Germany	Tanja Kuttler; Maike Merz
Hungary	Ádám Bíró; Olivér Kiss
Hungary	Kristóf Altmár; Márton Horváth
Kuwait	Maali Al-Enezi; Dalal Al-Naseem
Moldova	Alexei Covalciuc; Igor Covalciuc
Montenegro	Ivan Pavićević; Miloš Ražnatović
Norway	Håvard Kleven; Lars Jørum
Poland	Michał Fabryczny; Jakub Rawicki

Referees
Serbia	Vladimir Jovandić; Marko Sekulić
Slovakia	Andrej Budzák; Michaal Záhradník
Slovenia	Bojan Lah; David Sok
Spain	Javier Álvarez; Yon Bustamante
Spain	Ignacio Garcia; Andreu Marin
Sweden	Mirza Kurtagic; Mattias Wetterwik
Uruguay	Cristian Lemes; Mathias Sosa
Uzbekistan	Khasan Ismoilov; Khusan Ismoilov

== Preliminary round ==
The schedule was announced on 9 February 2026, with the throw-off times being revealed on 18 June 2026.

All times are local (UTC+1).

=== Group A ===
Pos	Team	Pld	W	D	L	GF	GA	GD	Pts	Qualification
1	Germany (H)	0	0	0	0	0	0	0	0	Main round
2	Serbia	0	0	0	0	0	0	0	0	Main round
3	Tunisia	0	0	0	0	0	0	0	0	Main round
4	Uruguay	0	0	0	0	0	0	0	0	Presidents Cup

First match(es) will be played: 13 January 2027. Source: IHF
Rules for classification: 1) points; 2) head-to-head points; 3) head-to-head goal difference; 4) head-to-head number of goals scored; 5) goal difference.
(H) Hosts

13 January 2027; 17:30	Serbia	v	Uruguay	SAP Garden, Munich

13 January 2027; 20:30	Germany	v	Tunisia	SAP Garden, Munich

15 January 2027; 18:00	Serbia	v	Tunisia	SAP Garden, Munich

15 January 2027; 20:30	Uruguay	v	Germany	SAP Garden, Munich

17 January 2027; 18:00	Tunisia	v	Uruguay	SAP Garden, Munich

17 January 2027; 20:30	Germany	v	Serbia	SAP Garden, Munich

=== Group B ===
Pos	Team	Pld	W	D	L	GF	GA	GD	Pts	Qualification
1	Egypt	0	0	0	0	0	0	0	0	Main round
2	Italy	0	0	0	0	0	0	0	0	Main round
3	Cape Verde	0	0	0	0	0	0	0	0	Main round
4	Saudi Arabia	0	0	0	0	0	0	0	0	Presidents Cup

First match(es) will be played: 13 January 2027. Source: IHF
Rules for classification: 1) points; 2) head-to-head points; 3) head-to-head goal difference; 4) head-to-head number of goals scored; 5) goal difference.

13 January 2027; 18:00	Italy	v	Saudi Arabia	Porsche-Arena, Stuttgart

13 January 2027; 20:30	Egypt	v	Cape Verde	Porsche-Arena, Stuttgart

15 January 2027; 18:00	Saudi Arabia	v	Egypt	Porsche-Arena, Stuttgart

15 January 2027; 20:30	Italy	v	Cape Verde	Porsche-Arena, Stuttgart

17 January 2027; 18:00	Cape Verde	v	Saudi Arabia	Porsche-Arena, Stuttgart

17 January 2027; 20:30	Egypt	v	Italy	Porsche-Arena, Stuttgart

=== Group C ===
Pos	Team	Pld	W	D	L	GF	GA	GD	Pts	Qualification
1	Croatia	0	0	0	0	0	0	0	0	Main round
2	Spain	0	0	0	0	0	0	0	0	Main round
3	Chile	0	0	0	0	0	0	0	0	Main round
4	Turkey	0	0	0	0	0	0	0	0	Presidents Cup

First match(es) will be played: 14 January 2027. Source: IHF
Rules for classification: 1) points; 2) head-to-head points; 3) head-to-head goal difference; 4) head-to-head number of goals scored; 5) goal difference.

14 January 2027; 18:00	Spain	v	Turkey	SAP Garden, Munich

14 January 2027; 20:30	Croatia	v	Chile	SAP Garden, Munich

16 January 2027; 18:00	Spain	v	Chile	SAP Garden, Munich

16 January 2027; 20:30	Turkey	v	Croatia	SAP Garden, Munich

18 January 2027; 18:00	Chile	v	Turkey	SAP Garden, Munich

18 January 2027; 20:30	Croatia	v	Spain	SAP Garden, Munich

=== Group D ===
Pos	Team	Pld	W	D	L	GF	GA	GD	Pts	Qualification
1	Argentina	0	0	0	0	0	0	0	0	Main round
2	France	0	0	0	0	0	0	0	0	Main round
3	Brazil	0	0	0	0	0	0	0	0	Main round
4	Kuwait	0	0	0	0	0	0	0	0	Presidents Cup

First match(es) will be played: 14 January 2027. Source: IHF
Rules for classification: 1) points; 2) head-to-head points; 3) head-to-head goal difference; 4) head-to-head number of goals scored; 5) goal difference.

14 January 2027; 18:00/30	Argentina	v	Brazil	Porsche-Arena, Stuttgart

14 January 2027; 20:30/21:00	France	v	Kuwait	Porsche-Arena, Stuttgart

16 January 2027; 18:00/30	France	v	Brazil	Porsche-Arena, Stuttgart

16 January 2027; 20:30/21:00	Kuwait	v	Argentina	Porsche-Arena, Stuttgart

18 January 2027; 18:00/30	Brazil	v	Kuwait	Porsche-Arena, Stuttgart

18 January 2027; 20:30/21:00	Argentina	v	France	Porsche-Arena, Stuttgart

=== Group E ===
Pos	Team	Pld	W	D	L	GF	GA	GD	Pts	Qualification
1	Sweden	0	0	0	0	0	0	0	0	Main round
2	Norway	0	0	0	0	0	0	0	0	Main round
3	Greece	0	0	0	0	0	0	0	0	Main round
4	Qatar	0	0	0	0	0	0	0	0	Presidents Cup

First match(es) will be played: 14 January 2027. Source: IHF
Rules for classification: 1) points; 2) head-to-head points; 3) head-to-head goal difference; 4) head-to-head number of goals scored; 5) goal difference.

14 January 2027; 18:00	Sweden	v	Greece	Wunderino Arena, Kiel

14 January 2027; 20:30	Norway	v	Qatar	Wunderino Arena, Kiel

16 January 2027; 18:00	Qatar	v	Sweden	Wunderino Arena, Kiel

16 January 2027; 20:30	Norway	v	Greece	Wunderino Arena, Kiel

18 January 2027; 18:00	Greece	v	Qatar	Wunderino Arena, Kiel

18 January 2027; 20:30	Sweden	v	Norway	Wunderino Arena, Kiel

=== Group F ===
Pos	Team	Pld	W	D	L	GF	GA	GD	Pts	Qualification
1	Portugal	0	0	0	0	0	0	0	0	Main round
2	Faroe Islands	0	0	0	0	0	0	0	0	Main round
3	Poland	0	0	0	0	0	0	0	0	Main round
4	Algeria	0	0	0	0	0	0	0	0	Presidents Cup

First match(es) will be played: 14 January 2027. Source: IHF
Rules for classification: 1) points; 2) head-to-head points; 3) head-to-head goal difference; 4) head-to-head number of goals scored; 5) goal difference.

14 January 2027; 18:00	Faroe Islands	v	Algeria	GETEC Arena, Magdeburg

14 January 2027; 20:30	Portugal	v	Poland	GETEC Arena, Magdeburg

16 January 2027; 18:00	Algeria	v	Portugal	GETEC Arena, Magdeburg

16 January 2027; 20:30	Faroe Islands	v	Poland	GETEC Arena, Magdeburg

18 January 2027; 18:00	Poland	v	Algeria	GETEC Arena, Magdeburg

18 January 2027; 20:30	Portugal	v	Faroe Islands	GETEC Arena, Magdeburg

=== Group G ===
Pos	Team	Pld	W	D	L	GF	GA	GD	Pts	Qualification
1	Denmark	0	0	0	0	0	0	0	0	Main round
2	Slovenia	0	0	0	0	0	0	0	0	Main round
3	United States	0	0	0	0	0	0	0	0	Main round
4	Angola	0	0	0	0	0	0	0	0	Presidents Cup

First match(es) will be played: 15 January 2027. Source: IHF
Rules for classification: 1) points; 2) head-to-head points; 3) head-to-head goal difference; 4) head-to-head number of goals scored; 5) goal difference.

15 January 2027; 18:00	Slovenia	v	Angola	Wunderino Arena, Kiel

15 January 2027; 20:30	Denmark	v	United States	Wunderino Arena, Kiel

17 January 2027; 18:00	Slovenia	v	United States	Wunderino Arena, Kiel

17 January 2027; 20:30	Angola	v	Denmark	Wunderino Arena, Kiel

19 January 2027; 18:00	United States	v	Angola	Wunderino Arena, Kiel

19 January 2027; 20:30	Denmark	v	Slovenia	Wunderino Arena, Kiel

=== Group H ===
Pos	Team	Pld	W	D	L	GF	GA	GD	Pts	Qualification
1	Iceland	0	0	0	0	0	0	0	0	Main round
2	North Macedonia	0	0	0	0	0	0	0	0	Main round
3	Bahrain	0	0	0	0	0	0	0	0	Main round
4	Japan	0	0	0	0	0	0	0	0	Presidents Cup

First match(es) will be played: 15 January 2027. Source: IHF
Rules for classification: 1) points; 2) head-to-head points; 3) head-to-head goal difference; 4) head-to-head number of goals scored; 5) goal difference.

15 January 2027; 18:00	North Macedonia	v	Japan	GETEC Arena, Magdeburg

15 January 2027; 20:30	Iceland	v	Bahrain	GETEC Arena, Magdeburg

17 January 2027; 18:00	North Macedonia	v	Bahrain	GETEC Arena, Magdeburg

17 January 2027; 20:30	Japan	v	Iceland	GETEC Arena, Magdeburg

19 January 2027; 18:00	Bahrain	v	Japan	GETEC Arena, Magdeburg

19 January 2027; 20:30	Iceland	v	North Macedonia	GETEC Arena, Magdeburg

== Presidents Cup ==
=== Group I ===
Pos	Team	Pld	W	D	L	GF	GA	GD	Pts	Qualification
1	A4	0	0	0	0	0	0	0	0	25th place game
2	B4	0	0	0	0	0	0	0	0	27th place game
3	E4	0	0	0	0	0	0	0	0	29th place game
4	F4	0	0	0	0	0	0	0	0	31st place game

First match(es) will be played: 20 January 2027. Source:
Rules for classification: 1) points; 2) head-to-head points; 3) head-to-head goal difference; 4) head-to-head number of goals scored; 5) goal difference.

20 January 2027	A4	v	B4	GETEC Arena, Magdeburg

20 January 2027	E4	v	F4	GETEC Arena, Magdeburg

22 January 2027	A4	v	E4	GETEC Arena, Magdeburg

22 January 2027	B4	v	F4	GETEC Arena, Magdeburg

24 January 2027	F4	v	A4	GETEC Arena, Magdeburg

24 January 2027	B4	v	E4	GETEC Arena, Magdeburg

=== Group II ===
Pos	Team	Pld	W	D	L	GF	GA	GD	Pts	Qualification
1	C4	0	0	0	0	0	0	0	0	25th place game
2	D4	0	0	0	0	0	0	0	0	27th place game
3	G4	0	0	0	0	0	0	0	0	29th place game
4	H4	0	0	0	0	0	0	0	0	31st place game

First match(es) will be played: 21 January 2027. Source:
Rules for classification: 1) points; 2) head-to-head points; 3) head-to-head goal difference; 4) head-to-head number of goals scored; 5) goal difference.

21 January 2027	C4	v	D4	GETEC Arena, Magdeburg

21 January 2027	G4	v	H4	GETEC Arena, Magdeburg

23 January 2027	C4	v	G4	GETEC Arena, Magdeburg

23 January 2027	D4	v	H4	GETEC Arena, Magdeburg

25 January 2027	H4	v	C4	GETEC Arena, Magdeburg

25 January 2027	D4	v	G4	GETEC Arena, Magdeburg

=== 31st place game ===
27 January 2027	I4	v	II4	GETEC Arena, Magdeburg

=== 29th place game ===
27 January 2027	I3	v	II3	GETEC Arena, Magdeburg

=== 27th place game ===
27 January 2027	I2	v	II2	GETEC Arena, Magdeburg

=== 25th place game ===
27 January 2027	I1	v	II1	GETEC Arena, Magdeburg

== Main round ==
All points obtained in the preliminary round against teams that advance as well are carried over.

=== Group I ===
Pos	Team	Pld	W	D	L	GF	GA	GD	Pts	Qualification
1	A1	0	0	0	0	0	0	0	0	Quarterfinals
2	B1	0	0	0	0	0	0	0	0	Quarterfinals
3	A2	0	0	0	0	0	0	0	0	
4	B2	0	0	0	0	0	0	0	0	
5	A3	0	0	0	0	0	0	0	0	
6	B3	0	0	0	0	0	0	0	0	

First match(es) will be played: 20 January 2027. Source:
Rules for classification: 1) points; 2) head-to-head points; 3) head-to-head goal difference; 4) head-to-head number of goals scored; 5) goal difference.

20 January 2027	A1	v	B3	Lanxess Arena, Cologne

20 January 2027	B1	v	A2	Lanxess Arena, Cologne

20 January 2027	A3	v	B2	Lanxess Arena, Cologne

22 January 2027	A2	v	B3	Lanxess Arena, Cologne

22 January 2027	B2	v	A1	Lanxess Arena, Cologne

22 January 2027	A3	v	B1	Lanxess Arena, Cologne

24 January 2027	B1	v	A1	Lanxess Arena, Cologne

24 January 2027	B2	v	A2	Lanxess Arena, Cologne

24 January 2027	B3	v	A3	Lanxess Arena, Cologne

=== Group II ===
Pos	Team	Pld	W	D	L	GF	GA	GD	Pts	Qualification
1	C1	0	0	0	0	0	0	0	0	Quarterfinals
2	D1	0	0	0	0	0	0	0	0	Quarterfinals
3	C2	0	0	0	0	0	0	0	0	
4	D2	0	0	0	0	0	0	0	0	
5	C3	0	0	0	0	0	0	0	0	
6	D3	0	0	0	0	0	0	0	0	

First match(es) will be played: 21 January 2027. Source:
Rules for classification: 1) points; 2) head-to-head points; 3) head-to-head goal difference; 4) head-to-head number of goals scored; 5) goal difference.

21 January 2027	C1	v	D3	Lanxess Arena, Cologne

21 January 2027	D1	v	C2	Lanxess Arena, Cologne

21 January 2027	C3	v	D2	Lanxess Arena, Cologne

23 January 2027	C2	v	D3	Lanxess Arena, Cologne

23 January 2027	D2	v	C1	Lanxess Arena, Cologne

23 January 2027	C3	v	D1	Lanxess Arena, Cologne

25 January 2027	D1	v	C1	Lanxess Arena, Cologne

25 January 2027	D2	v	C2	Lanxess Arena, Cologne

25 January 2027	D3	v	C3	Lanxess Arena, Cologne

=== Group III ===
Pos	Team	Pld	W	D	L	GF	GA	GD	Pts	Qualification
1	E1	0	0	0	0	0	0	0	0	Quarterfinals
2	F1	0	0	0	0	0	0	0	0	Quarterfinals
3	E2	0	0	0	0	0	0	0	0	
4	F2	0	0	0	0	0	0	0	0	
5	E3	0	0	0	0	0	0	0	0	
6	F3	0	0	0	0	0	0	0	0	

First match(es) will be played: 20 January 2027. Source:
Rules for classification: 1) points; 2) head-to-head points; 3) head-to-head goal difference; 4) head-to-head number of goals scored; 5) goal difference.

20 January 2027	E1	v	F3	ZAG-Arena, Hanover

20 January 2027	F1	v	E2	ZAG-Arena, Hanover

20 January 2027	E3	v	F2	ZAG-Arena, Hanover

22 January 2027	E2	v	F3	ZAG-Arena, Hanover

22 January 2027	F2	v	E1	ZAG-Arena, Hanover

22 January 2027	E3	v	F1	ZAG-Arena, Hanover

24 January 2027	F1	v	E1	ZAG-Arena, Hanover

24 January 2027	F2	v	E2	ZAG-Arena, Hanover

24 January 2027	F3	v	E3	ZAG-Arena, Hanover

=== Group IV ===
Pos	Team	Pld	W	D	L	GF	GA	GD	Pts	Qualification
1	G1	0	0	0	0	0	0	0	0	Quarterfinals
2	H1	0	0	0	0	0	0	0	0	Quarterfinals
3	G2	0	0	0	0	0	0	0	0	
4	H2	0	0	0	0	0	0	0	0	
5	G3	0	0	0	0	0	0	0	0	
6	H3	0	0	0	0	0	0	0	0	

First match(es) will be played: 21 January 2027. Source:
Rules for classification: 1) points; 2) head-to-head points; 3) head-to-head goal difference; 4) head-to-head number of goals scored; 5) goal difference.

21 January 2027	G1	v	H3	ZAG-Arena, Hanover

21 January 2027	H1	v	G2	ZAG-Arena, Hanover

21 January 2027	G3	v	H2	ZAG-Arena, Hanover

23 January 2027	G2	v	H3	ZAG-Arena, Hanover

23 January 2027	H2	v	G1	ZAG-Arena, Hanover

23 January 2027	G3	v	H1	ZAG-Arena, Hanover

25 January 2027	H1	v	G1	ZAG-Arena, Hanover

25 January 2027	H2	v	G2	ZAG-Arena, Hanover

25 January 2027	H3	v	G3	ZAG-Arena, Hanover

== Final round ==
=== Bracket ===
Quarter-finals
26 January
I1
III2
27 January
II1
IV2
26 January
III1
I2
27 January
IV1
II2

Semi-finals
29 January
29 January

Final
31 January
Third place
31 January

Fifth place bracket

5–8th place semifinals
29 January
29 January

Fifth place game
31 January
Seventh place game
31 January

=== Quarterfinals ===
26 January 2027	I1	v	III2	Lanxess Arena, Cologne

26 January 2027	III1	v	I2	Lanxess Arena, Cologne

27 January 2027	II1	v	IV2	Lanxess Arena, Cologne

27 January 2027	IV1	v	II2	Lanxess Arena, Cologne

=== 5–8th place semifinals ===
29 January 2027	LQF1	v	LQF3	Lanxess Arena, Cologne

29 January 2027	LQF2	v	LQF4	Lanxess Arena, Cologne

=== Semifinals ===
29 January 2027	WQF1	v	WQF3	Lanxess Arena, Cologne

29 January 2027	WQF2	v	WQF4	Lanxess Arena, Cologne

=== Seventh place game ===
31 January 2027	LQF1	v	LQF2	Lanxess Arena, Cologne

=== Fifth place game ===
31 January 2027	WSF1	v	WSF2	Lanxess Arena, Cologne

=== Third place game ===
31 January 2027	LSF1	v	LSF2	Lanxess Arena, Cologne

=== Final ===
31 January 2027	WSF1	v	WSF2	Lanxess Arena, Cologne

== Final ranking ==
Places 1 to 8 and 25 to 32 will be decided by play-off or knock-out. Teams finishing third in the main round will be ranked 9th to 12th, teams finishing fourth in the main round will be ranked 13th to 16th, teams finishing fifth in the main round will be ranked 17th to 20th and teams ranked sixth will be ranked 21st to 24th. In case of a tie in points gained, the goal difference of the main round will be taken into account, then number of goals scored. If teams are still be equal, number of points gained in the preliminary round would be considered followed by the goal difference and then number of goals scored in the preliminary round.

Rank	Team
1st place, gold medalist(s)	
2nd place, silver medalist(s)	
3rd place, bronze medalist(s)	
4	
5	
6	
7	
8	
9	
10	
11	
12	
13	
14	
15	
16	
17	
18	
19	
20	
21	
22	
23	
24	
25	
26	
27	
28	
29	
30	
31	
32	

Qualified for the 2029 World Championship and 2028 Summer Olympics
