= Turkey men's national handball team =

Turkey

Information
- Association: Turkey Handball Federation (THF)
- Coach: Daniel Gordo
- Captain: Ramazan Döne

Colours
1st	2nd

Results

World Championship
- Appearances: 1 (First in 2027)
- Last updated on Unknown.

Turkey men's national handball team
Medal record

Mediterranean Games
Bronze medal – third place	2013 Mersin	Team

IHF Emerging Nations Championship
Silver medal – second place	2017 Veliko Tarnovo	Team

The Turkey national handball team is the national handball team of Turkey and is controlled by the Turkey Handball Federation.

== Events ==
=== World Championship ===
World Championship									Qualification							
Year	Rank	M	W	D	L	GF	GA	GD	M	W	D	L	GF	GA	GD	Link
(Nazi Germany) 1938	Did Not Qualify								Did Not Compete							
(Sweden) 1954	Did Not Qualify								Did Not Compete							
(East Germany) 1958	Did Not Qualify								Did Not Compete							
(West Germany) 1961	Did Not Qualify								Did Not Compete							
(Czechoslovakia) 1964	Did Not Qualify								Did Not Compete							
(Sweden) 1967	Did Not Qualify								Did Not Compete							
(France) 1970	Did Not Qualify								Did Not Compete							
(East Germany) 1974	Did Not Qualify								Did Not Compete							
(Denmark) 1978	Did Not Qualify								Did Not Compete							
(West Germany) 1982	Did Not Qualify								Did Not Compete							
(Switzerland) 1986	Did Not Qualify															
(Czechoslovakia) 1990	Did Not Qualify															
(Sweden) 1993	Did Not Qualify															
(Iceland) 1995	Did Not Qualify															
(Japan) 1997	Did Not Qualify								6	2	1	3	139	150	−11	
(Egypt) 1999	Did Not Qualify								6	2	1	3	166	172	−6	
(France) 2001	Did Not Qualify								6	4	0	2	169	142	+27	
(Portugal) 2003	Did Not Qualify								6	4	0	2	155	159	−4	
(Tunisia) 2005	Did Not Qualify								4	2	0	2	106	108	−2	
(Germany) 2007	Did Not Qualify								6	2	0	4	140	197	−57	Link
(Croatia) 2009	Did Not Qualify								4	0	0	4	87	109	−22	Link
(Sweden) 2011	Did Not Qualify								2	0	0	2	50	72	−22	Link
(Spain) 2013	Did Not Qualify								4	0	0	4	92	127	−35	Link
(Qatar) 2015	Did Not Qualify								6	2	0	4	146	156	−10	Link
(France) 2017	Did Not Qualify								4	3	0	1	117	110	+7	Link
(Denmark) / (Germany) 2019	Did Not Qualify								6	3	1	2	146	149	−3	Link
(Egypt) 2021	Did Not Qualify								2	2	0	0	66	53	+13	Link
(Poland) / (Sweden) 2023	Did Not Qualify								6	2	0	4	147	163	−16	Link
(Croatia) / (Denmark) / (Norway) 2025	Did Not Qualify								2	1	0	1	64	65	−1	Link
(Germany) 2027	Qualified								6	3	0	3	197	194	+3	Link
(France) / (Germany) 2029	to be determined															
(Denmark) / (Iceland) / (Norway) 2031	to be determined															
Total	1/30	–	0	0	0	0	0	0	76	32	3	41	1987	2126	−139	

=== European Championship ===
European Championship										Qualification							
Year	Round	Rank	M	W	D	L	GF	GA	GD	M	W	D	L	GF	GA	GD	Link
(Portugal) 1994	Did Not Qualify									8	3	2	3	176	159	+17	Link
(Spain) 1996	Did Not Qualify									12	6	2	4	303	259	+44	Link
(Italy) 1998	Did Not Qualify									6	4	1	1	149	137	+12	Link
(Croatia) 2000	Did Not Qualify									8	4	0	4	169	170	−1	Link
(Sweden) 2002	Did Not Qualify									8	5	0	3	217	208	+9	Link
(Slovenia) 2004	Did Not Qualify									8	5	1	2	231	197	+34	Link
(Switzerland) 2006	Did Not Qualify									6	2	0	4	188	198	−10	Link
(Norway) 2008	Did Not Qualify									6	1	0	5	167	186	−19	Link
(Austria) 2010	Did Not Qualify									8	0	0	8	193	272	−79	Link
(Serbia) 2012	Did Not Qualify									3	2	0	1	88	86	+2	Link
(Denmark) 2014	Did Not Qualify									8	3	1	5	232	263	−31	Link
(Poland) 2016	Did Not Qualify									6	0	0	6	141	195	−54	Link
(Croatia) 2018	Did Not Qualify									2	0	0	2	50	66	−16	Link
(Austria) (Norway) (Sweden) 2020	Did Not Qualify									10	4	1	5	244	251	−7	Link
(Hungary) / (Slovakia) 2022	Did Not Qualify									6	0	0	6	144	192	−48	Link
(Germany) 2024	Did Not Qualify									8	4	0	4	241	250	−9	Link
(Denmark) / (Norway) / (Sweden) 2026	Did Not Qualify									6	0	0	6	173	213	−40	Link
(Portugal) / (Spain) / (Switzerland) 2028	To be determined									To be determined							
Total	0/17	–	0	0	0	0	0	0	0	119	42	8	69	3106	3302	−196	_

=== IHF Emerging Nations Championship ===
1. 2015: Did Not Compete
2. 2017 – (silver) Silver Medal
3. 2019: Did Not Compete
4. 2023: Did Not Compete
5. 2025: Did Not Compete

=== Carpathian Trophy (men's handball) ===
1. 2001: Did Not Compete
2. 2002: (gold) Gold Medal
3. 2003: Did Not Compete
4. 2004: 5th
5. 2005: 4th
6. 2006: (silver) Silver Medal
7. 2007: Did Not Compete
8. 2010: Did Not Compete
9. 2011: Did Not Compete
10. 2012: (bronze) Bronze Medal
11. 2018: Did Not Compete
12. 2019: Did Not Compete
13. 2021: (silver) Silver Medal
14. 2022: Did Not Compete

=== Handball at the Islamic Solidarity Games ===
1. 2005: Did Not Compete
2. 2017: (silver) Silver Medal
3. 2021: (silver) Silver Medal

=== Handball at the Mediterranean Games ===
1. 1967 – Did Not Compete
2. 1971 – No Handball Games
3. 1975 – Did Not Compete
4. 1979 – 7th
5. 1983 – 8th
6. 1987 – 7th
7. 1991 – 8th
8. 1993 – 9th
9. 1997 – 10th
10. 2001 – 11th
11. 2005 – 10th
12. 2009 – 4th
13. 2013 – (bronze) Bronze Medal
14. 2018 – 4th
15. 2022 – 8th

== Current roster ==
As of 7 May 2025

- 12 Enis Yatkın (GK)
- 26 Yunus Özmusul (GK)
- 2 Enis Harun Hacıoğlu
- 5 Sadık Emre Herseklioğlu
- 7 Ozan Erdoğan
- 8 Durmuş Ali Tınkır
- 11 Doruk Pehlivan
- 17 Görkem Biçer
- 20 İlkan Keleşoğlu
- 22 Eyüp Arda Yıldız
- 23 Danyel Kaya
- 27 Ediz Aktaş
- 35 Şevket Yağmuroğlu
- 52 Alper Aydın
- 56 Ali EDmre Babacan
- 73 Koray Ayar
