= Carpathian Trophy (men's handball) =

The Carpathian Trophy (Romanian: Trofeul Carpaţi) is an annual men's friendly handball tournament organised by the Romanian Handball Federation. The first edition took place in Bucharest in 1959.

== Tournament structure ==
It reached the 44th edition in December 2022. There is no precise format for the tournament, even though recently there were four participating teams.

== Editions ==
Year	Host city	Final Rankings
Year	Host city	Gold	Silver	Bronze	Fourth place	Fifth	Sixth place
2001; Details	(Romania); Iași	Romania	Greece	Romania B	Bulgaria
2002; Details	(Romania); Iași	Turkey	Romania	Romania B	Ukraine	Egypt	Bulgaria
2003; Details	(Romania); Iași	Romania	Romania B	Ukraine	Macedonia	Belarus	Bulgaria
2004; Details	(Romania); Timișoara	Romania	Jordan	Macedonia	Netherlands	Turkey	Egypt
2005; Details	(Romania); Timișoara	Romania	Netherlands	Italy	Turkey
2006; Details	(Romania); Timișoara	Romania	Turkey	Macedonia	Italy
2007; Details	(Romania); Drobeta-Turnu Severin	Romania	Montenegro	Ukraine	Macedonia
2010; Details	(Romania); Oradea	Tunisia	Romania	Macedonia	Belarus
2011; Details	(Romania); Piatra Neamţ	Romania	Ukraine	Romania B	Jordan
2012; Details	(Romania); Oradea	Romania	Ukraine	Turkey	Romania B
2018; Details	(Romania); Călărași	Romania	Portugal	Bahrain	Tunisia
2019; Details	(Romania); Bucharest	North Macedonia	Romania	Netherlands	Algeria
2021; Details	(Romania); Cluj-Napoca	Romania	Turkey	Switzerland and Iran withdrew due to Covid-19 cases in their squads.
2022; Details	(Romania); Oradea	Egypt	Slovakia	Romania	Algeria

- Some editions were initially planned but cancelled due to schedule.

== Summary ==
Team	Wins
Romania	31
Serbia	3
Denmark	2
Germany	2
Russia	2
Egypt	1
North Macedonia	1
Tunisia	1
Turkey	1

== See also ==
- Carpathian Trophy (women's handball)
- Posten Cup
