= Brethren of the Croatian Dragon =

- Družba 'Braća Hrvatskoga Zmaja'
- Founded: 26 November 1905; 120 years ago
- Headquarters: Kamenita Ulica 1, Zagreb, Croatia
- Website: dbhz.hr

The Society of Brethren of the Croatian Dragon (Croatian: Družba "Braća Hrvatskoga Zmaja"; Latin: Societas fratres draconis croatici) is a Croatian historical and cultural society founded on 16 November 1905. Their headquarters are located in Stone Gate Tower in Croatia's capital, Zagreb.

== History ==
The Society was established during a period of Croatian territorial and political disunion. Limited autonomy was granted only to Banic Croatia, which functioned as a co-state with Hungary within the Austro-Hungarian Monarchy. Other regions remained beyond the authority of the Croatian Ban and parliament.

The Society was founded under politically complex and challenging conditions for the Croats, during a period of well‑founded hopes for resolving Croatian national issues—above all, national unification and the integration of Croatian lands into a pluralistic society shaped by political and national unity. At that time, opportunities within the Austro‑Hungarian Monarchy, as well as relations with other European countries, were neither encouraging nor favorable. Thus, the establishment of a Croatian cultural society, grounded in the principles of patriotism, sincere friendship, brotherly love, respect, and unity, represented a significant breakthrough in strengthening, developing, modernizing, and advancing the prosperity of both Croatian society and Croatia itself.

The Society was formed with the purpose to nurture and promote the cultural and ethnic values of the Croatian people, strengthening national awareness, shaping modern social content, reviving memories of glorious Croatian historical events and famous Croats, as well as preserving, renewing and promoting Croatian cultural and natural heritage. The Society's activity is testified by its work, erected monuments, placed memorial tablets, organized lectures, round tables, symposia and conferences, published books and publications, but also pilgrimages, commemorations, festivities and appropriate activities.

The Society of Brethren of the Croatian Dragon has dedicated all its activities to the Croatian people. Its centennial history can be divided into three distinct periods: the first, from its founding in 1905 until the banning of its activities in 1946 at the onset of political uniformity; the second, from the ban until the Society’s renewal in 1990; and the third, from its renewal to the present day. During the Independent State of Croatia, the Society was elevated to the status of a Knight’s Order in 1941. It was briefly restored in 1945 before being banned again under Communist Yugoslavia in 1946, and finally re‑established in 1990. It is important to emphasize that, from its inception as a distinctly cultural Croatian brotherhood, the Society has shared in the destiny of the Croatian people and the nation itself.

The Society of Brethren of the Croatian Dragon operates from its headquarters in Zagreb and through 19 branches across Croatia. Its membership includes full members, contributing members, and honorary members. The association brings together individuals from various professional and social backgrounds. Its activities are focused on the preservation and promotion of Croatian cultural heritage, history, and national identity. The Society also organizes events and initiatives related to historical commemoration and public awareness.

The true spirit of the Society’s activities is best expressed through its motto: “Pro aris et focis, Deo propitio!” — “For altars and hearths, with God’s grace!” In addition, within the Dragon Headquarters—specifically in the Dragon and Knight’s Hall inside the Stone Gate Tower—other inscriptions are carved into the beams, whose words and meanings remain a constant source of inspiration for the Society. Among them are the reflections of Marquis Fran Krsto Frankopan: “He who dies honorably lives forever!”; the verses of poet Ivan Gundulić: “Fair liberty, beloved liberty, liberty sweet avowed, thou art the treasured gift that God to us endowed!”; and the words of writer Antun Gustav Matoš: "As long as there is heart, there is Croatia!"

Since its founding, the Society has upheld Christian principles in science, art, and both public and private life. The patron of the Society of Brethren of the Croatian Dragon is St. George Martyr, and it enjoys the special protection of the Holy Virgin Mary of the Stone Gate.

The Society Dragon's salute is: "God grant us happiness! - Long live the Croatian Dragon!"

In 1907, the Society claimed to have found the remains of Petar Zrinski and Fran Krsto Frankopan, and by 1919 those were moved to the Zagreb Cathedral.

== Grand Masters ==
- Emilij Laszowski (1906–1935)
- Milutin Mayer (1936–1941)
- Mladen Deželić (1942–1945)
- Antun Bauer (1990–1992)
- Đuro Deželić (1992–1993)
- Juraj Kolarić (1993–2001)
- Matija Salaj (2001–2006)
- Dragutin Feletar (2006–2011)
- Nevio Šetić (2011–2021)
- Mislav Grgić (2021–current)

== Members ==
- Zvonimir Šeparović
- Milan Bandić
