= Peter Bredsdorff-Larsen =

Danish handball coach (born 1967)

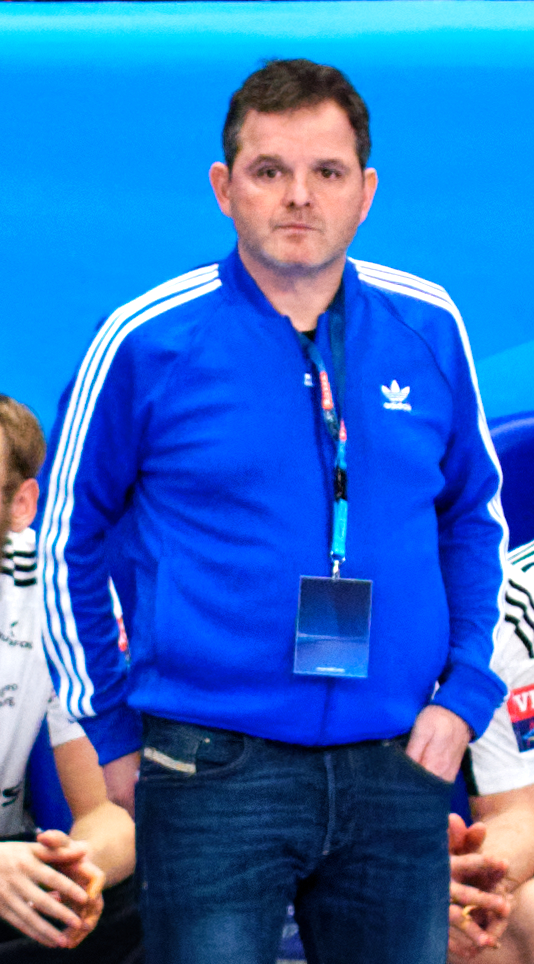
- Champions league PSG vs Bjerringbro-Silkeborg, 2017.

Personal information
- Nationality: Danish
- Born: 11 August 1967 (age 59) Virum, Denmark

Sport
- Sport: Handball
National team
Years	Team	Apps	(Gls)
1994	Denmark	1	(1)

Teams managed
- Years: Team
- 2003-2008: Vrold/Skanderborg
- 2005-2015: Assistant coach at (Denmark) national team
- 2008-2011: AaB Håndbold
- 2011-2013: KIF Kolding
- 2013-2020: Bjerringbro-Silkeborg
- 2021-: Faroe Islands

Peter Bredsdorff-Larsen (born 11 August 1967) is a Danish handball coach and former player, whom currently is head coach for Faroe Islands men's national handball team.

As a player he played for Vejlby-Risskov Idrætsklub and IK Skovbakken. He managed to get a single national team match against Sweden in 1994, where he scored one goal.

== Coaching career ==
Peter Bredsdorff-Larsen started his training career as the assistant coach at Randers HK before moving on to the same position at AGF Håndbold in 2022.

=== Vrold/Skanderborg ===
Peter Bredsdorff-Larsens first head coach position came in 2003 at Vrold/Skanderborg, which at the time played in the 1st division. In 2007 he got the team promoted to the top league in Denmark, Danish Men's Handball League.

=== The Danish national team ===
While he was at Vrold/Skanderborg, he was appointed as the assistant coach on the Danish national team by newly appointed Head coach Ulrik Wilbek. His initial contract ran until the Olympics 2008 in Beijing, but he would stay the assistant coach for Denmark men's national handball team for 10 years until 2015, first together with head coach Ulrik Wilbek and later under head coach Gudmundur Gudmundsson. With the Danish national team he won both the 2008 and 2012 European Men's Handball Championship.

=== Aab Håndbold ===
While he was the assistant manager of the Danish national team, he was simultaneously appointed to be the head coach of the Danish Men's Handball League AAB Håndbold. With Aab he won the league in 2010.

=== KIF Kolding ===
In 2011 he was appointed as the head coach of KIF Kolding. His tenure here however ended on a sour note, where the players lost trust in him. In an agreement with the club, the players of KIF Kolding agreed in 2013 to take a 5% wage cut in order to afford the compensation to fire Bredsdorff-Larsen. He was replaced by Aron Kristjansson.

=== Bjerringbro-Silkeborg ===
After his tenure at KIF Kolding he was appointed head coach of Bjerringbro-Silkeborg. He would stay at the club for 7 years and manage to win the Danish league once more in 2016. This was the first time Bjerringbro-Silkeborg won the league.

=== Faroe Islands national team ===
In 2021 he was appointed as the head coach of the Faroe Islands men's national handball team. He led the team to their first ever major international tournament; the 2024 European Men's Handball Championship.

At the 2026 European Men's Handball Championship he led the Faroese team to their first ever win at a major international tournament, when they beat Montenegro 37–24.

== Referee coach ==
In addition to handball coaches, he has also worked with education referees in Dansk Håndbold. In 2023 he was however dismissed after multiple clubs filed complaints about his neutrality due to his position on the board of the 1st division club Aarhus HC. He was replaced by fellow Danish coach Jan Pytlick.
