= Tin Tokić =

Italian-Croatian handball player (born 1985)

Personal information
- Full name: Tin Tokić
- Nationality: Italian, Croatian
- Born: 29 December 1985 (age 40) Koper, SR Slovenia, SFR Yugoslavia
- Height: 2.02 m (6 ft 8 in)

Sport
- Sport: Handball
- Position: Left Back
- Current club: Soultz Bollwiller Handball

Youth career
- Years: Team
- –: RK Umag

Senior clubs
- Years: Team
- –2009: Pallamano Trieste
- 2009–2011: JD Arrate
- 2011–2012: Cuatro Rayas Valladolid
- 2012–2014: Pays d'Aix UCH
- loan: → ESBM Besançon
- 2014–2015: Știința Dedeman Bacău
- 2015-2017: TV Möhlin
- 2019-2019: Soultz Bollwiller Handball
National team
- Years: Team
- 2005-2016: Italy

Tin Tokić (born 29 December 1985) is an Italian-Croatian retired handballer. He retired in 2020 when playing for the French club Soultz Bollwiller Handball. His last matches however was in 2019 due to COVID-19 cancelling the season in 2020. He played for the Italian national team between 2005 and 2016
