= Handball at the 2026 Mediterranean Games – Men's tournament =

Men's handball at the 2026 Mediterranean Games
Tournament details
- Host country: Italy
- Venue: 1 (in 1 host city)
- Dates: 23 – 31 August
- Teams: 8 (from 2 confederations)

Final positions
- Champions: Egypt (2nd title)
- Runners-up: Greece
- Third place: Algeria
- Fourth place: Portugal

The men's handball tournament at the 2026 Mediterranean Games will be held from 23 to 31 August 2026 in Fasano.

== Preliminary round ==
All times are local (UTC+2).

=== Group A ===
Pos	Team	Pld	W	D	L	GF	GA	GD	Pts	Qualification
1	Egypt	3	3	0	0	105	70	+35	6	Semifinals
2	Portugal	3	2	0	1	91	93	−2	4	Semifinals
3	Italy (H)	3	1	0	2	91	79	+12	2	5th-8th place classification
4	Kosovo	3	0	0	3	69	114	−45	0	5th-8th place classification

Rules for classification: 1) Points; 2) Head-to-head points; 3) Head-to-head goal difference; 4) Head-to-head goals scored; 5) Goal difference; 6) Goals scored; 7) Draw.
(H) Hosts

23 August 2026; 17:30	Egypt	38–27	Portugal	Palazzetto dello Sport, Fasano; Referees: Pietro Monitillo / Francesco Simone (ITA)
23 August 2026; 17:30	Khaled 8	(18–14)	Fernandes 4	Palazzetto dello Sport, Fasano; Referees: Pietro Monitillo / Francesco Simone (ITA)
23 August 2026; 17:30	1× (yellow card) 3× (suspension) 1× (red card)	Report	1× (yellow card) 3× (suspension)	Palazzetto dello Sport, Fasano; Referees: Pietro Monitillo / Francesco Simone (ITA)

23 August 2026; 20:00	Italy	39–23	Kosovo	Palazzetto dello Sport, Fasano; Referees: Maryna Duplii / Olena Karpushchenko (UKR)
23 August 2026; 20:00	Fadanelli 9	(21–9)	Gjuka 7	Palazzetto dello Sport, Fasano; Referees: Maryna Duplii / Olena Karpushchenko (UKR)
23 August 2026; 20:00	3× (suspension)	Report	7× (suspension)	Palazzetto dello Sport, Fasano; Referees: Maryna Duplii / Olena Karpushchenko (UKR)

25 August 2026; 11:00	Kosovo	21–42	Egypt	Palazzetto dello Sport, Fasano; Referees: Othmen Azzabi, Aymen Beb Abdellatif (TUN)
25 August 2026; 11:00	Pajaziti 4	(14–17)	Khaled 7	Palazzetto dello Sport, Fasano; Referees: Othmen Azzabi, Aymen Beb Abdellatif (TUN)
25 August 2026; 11:00	3× (suspension)	Report	3× (suspension)	Palazzetto dello Sport, Fasano; Referees: Othmen Azzabi, Aymen Beb Abdellatif (TUN)

25 August 2026; 20:00	Italy	30–31	Portugal	Palazzetto dello Sport, Fasano; Referees: Mathilde Cournil, Loriane Lamour (FRA)
25 August 2026; 20:00	Savini 6	(14–16)	Fernandes 7	Palazzetto dello Sport, Fasano; Referees: Mathilde Cournil, Loriane Lamour (FRA)
25 August 2026; 20:00	1× (yellow card) 2× (suspension)	Report	5× (suspension)	Palazzetto dello Sport, Fasano; Referees: Mathilde Cournil, Loriane Lamour (FRA)

27 August 2026; 17:30	Portugal	33–25	Kosovo	Palazzetto dello Sport, Fasano; Referees: Pietro Monitillo / Francesco Simone (ITA)
27 August 2026; 17:30	Rodrigues 8	(17–12)	Mushkolaj 8	Palazzetto dello Sport, Fasano; Referees: Pietro Monitillo / Francesco Simone (ITA)
27 August 2026; 17:30	4× (suspension)	Report	5× (suspension)	Palazzetto dello Sport, Fasano; Referees: Pietro Monitillo / Francesco Simone (ITA)

27 August 2026; 20:00	Egypt	25–22	Italy	Palazzetto dello Sport, Fasano; Referees: Maryna Duplii / Olena Karpushchenko (UKR)
27 August 2026; 20:00	Khaled, Saif 6	(12–11)	Angiolini 5	Palazzetto dello Sport, Fasano; Referees: Maryna Duplii / Olena Karpushchenko (UKR)
27 August 2026; 20:00	9× (suspension) 1× (red card)	Report	5× (suspension)	Palazzetto dello Sport, Fasano; Referees: Maryna Duplii / Olena Karpushchenko (UKR)

=== Group B ===
Pos	Team	Pld	W	D	L	GF	GA	GD	Pts	Qualification
1	Greece	3	2	1	0	102	79	+23	5	Semifinals
2	Algeria	3	2	1	0	92	76	+16	5	Semifinals
3	Tunisia	3	1	0	2	89	97	−8	2	5th-8th place classification
4	Cyprus	3	0	0	3	75	106	−31	0	5th-8th place classification

Rules for classification: 1) Points; 2) Head-to-head points; 3) Head-to-head goal difference; 4) Head-to-head goals scored; 5) Goal difference; 6) Goals scored; 7) Draw.

23 August 2026; 11:00	Tunisia	29–37	Greece	Palazzetto dello Sport, Fasano; Referees: Mustapha Deche / Mohamed Ghouarda (ALG)
23 August 2026; 11:00	Mathlouthi 6	(14–20)	Pagiatis, Stathis 5	Palazzetto dello Sport, Fasano; Referees: Mustapha Deche / Mohamed Ghouarda (ALG)
23 August 2026; 11:00	1× (yellow card) 7× (suspension) 1× (red card)	Report	1× (yellow card) 9× (suspension) 1× (red card)	Palazzetto dello Sport, Fasano; Referees: Mustapha Deche / Mohamed Ghouarda (ALG)

23 August 2026; 15:00	Algeria	33–24	Cyprus	Palazzetto dello Sport, Fasano; Referees: Othmen Azzabi / Aymen Ben Abdellatif (TUN)
23 August 2026; 15:00	Sadi 7	(17–10)	Alexandros, Argyrou 5	Palazzetto dello Sport, Fasano; Referees: Othmen Azzabi / Aymen Ben Abdellatif (TUN)
23 August 2026; 15:00	6× (suspension) 1× (red card)	Report	1× (yellow card) 2× (suspension)	Palazzetto dello Sport, Fasano; Referees: Othmen Azzabi / Aymen Ben Abdellatif (TUN)

25 August 2026; 15:00	Cyprus	27–34	Tunisia	Palazzetto dello Sport, Fasano; Referees: Maryna Duplii, Olena Karpushchenko (UKR)
25 August 2026; 15:00	Alexandros 7	(12–19)	Ben Fredj 9	Palazzetto dello Sport, Fasano; Referees: Maryna Duplii, Olena Karpushchenko (UKR)
25 August 2026; 15:00	2× (suspension)	Report	7× (suspension) 1× (red card)	Palazzetto dello Sport, Fasano; Referees: Maryna Duplii, Olena Karpushchenko (UKR)

25 August 2026; 17:30	Algeria	26–26	Greece	Palazzetto dello Sport, Fasano; Referees: Pietro Monitillo, Francesco Simone (ITA)
25 August 2026; 17:30	Naim 11	(15–15)	Stathis 7	Palazzetto dello Sport, Fasano; Referees: Pietro Monitillo, Francesco Simone (ITA)
25 August 2026; 17:30	2× (yellow card) 4× (suspension)	Report	1× (yellow card) 3× (suspension)	Palazzetto dello Sport, Fasano; Referees: Pietro Monitillo, Francesco Simone (ITA)

27 August 2026; 11:00	Greece	39–24	Cyprus	Palazzetto dello Sport, Fasano; Referees: Mustapha Deche / Mohamed Ghouarda (ALG)
27 August 2026; 11:00	Stathis, Rousos 6	(18–11)	Hadjipetrou 6	Palazzetto dello Sport, Fasano; Referees: Mustapha Deche / Mohamed Ghouarda (ALG)
27 August 2026; 11:00	1× (yellow card) 2× (suspension)	Report	1× (yellow card) 4× (suspension)	Palazzetto dello Sport, Fasano; Referees: Mustapha Deche / Mohamed Ghouarda (ALG)

27 August 2026; 15:00	Tunisia	26–33	Algeria	Palazzetto dello Sport, Fasano; Referees: Mathilde Cournil / Loriane Lamour (FRA)
27 August 2026; 15:00	Ben Fredj 7	(12–17)	Naim 8	Palazzetto dello Sport, Fasano; Referees: Mathilde Cournil / Loriane Lamour (FRA)
27 August 2026; 15:00	2× (suspension) 1× (red card)	Report	5× (suspension) 1× (red card)	Palazzetto dello Sport, Fasano; Referees: Mathilde Cournil / Loriane Lamour (FRA)

== Classification round ==
=== Bracket ===
5th-8th classification round
29 August
Italy	37
Cyprus	20
29 August
Tunisia	39
Kosovo	35

5th place game
31 August
Italy	31
Tunisia	32
7th place game
31 August
Cyprus	27
Kosovo	31

=== 5th-8th place classification ===
29 August 2026; 11:00	Italy	37–20	Cyprus	Palazzetto dello Sport, Fasano; Referees: Mathilde Cournil / Loriane Lamour (FRA)
29 August 2026; 11:00	De Angelis 12	(17–8)	Alexandros, Misailidis 7	Palazzetto dello Sport, Fasano; Referees: Mathilde Cournil / Loriane Lamour (FRA)
29 August 2026; 11:00	4× (suspension)	Report	1× (yellow card) 5× (suspension)	Palazzetto dello Sport, Fasano; Referees: Mathilde Cournil / Loriane Lamour (FRA)

29 August 2026; 15:00	Tunisia	39–35	Kosovo	Palazzetto dello Sport, Fasano; Referees: Mustapha Deche / Mohamed Ghouarda (ALG)
29 August 2026; 15:00	Mustapha 10	(19–13)	Gjuka 10	Palazzetto dello Sport, Fasano; Referees: Mustapha Deche / Mohamed Ghouarda (ALG)
29 August 2026; 15:00	7× (suspension)	Report	2× (suspension) 1× (red card)	Palazzetto dello Sport, Fasano; Referees: Mustapha Deche / Mohamed Ghouarda (ALG)

=== Seventh place game ===
31 August 2026; 11:00	Cyprus	27–31	Kosovo	Palazzetto dello Sport, Fasano; Referees: Othmen Azzabi / Aymen Ben Abdellatif (TUN)
31 August 2026; 11:00	Alexandros, Misailidis 7	(11–13)	three players 6	Palazzetto dello Sport, Fasano; Referees: Othmen Azzabi / Aymen Ben Abdellatif (TUN)
31 August 2026; 11:00	1× (yellow card) 4× (suspension)	Report	4× (suspension) 1× (red card)	Palazzetto dello Sport, Fasano; Referees: Othmen Azzabi / Aymen Ben Abdellatif (TUN)

=== Fifth place game ===
31 August 2026; 15:00	Italy	31–32	Tunisia	Palazzetto dello Sport, Fasano; Referees: Mustapha Deche / Mohamed Ghouarda (ALG)
31 August 2026; 15:00	Angiolini 6	(16–14)	Ben Fredj 6	Palazzetto dello Sport, Fasano; Referees: Mustapha Deche / Mohamed Ghouarda (ALG)
31 August 2026; 15:00	3× (suspension)	Report	4× (suspension)	Palazzetto dello Sport, Fasano; Referees: Mustapha Deche / Mohamed Ghouarda (ALG)

== Final round ==
=== Bracket ===
Semifinal
29 August
Egypt	27
Algeria	25
29 August
Greece	32
Portugal	30

Gold medal game
31 August
Egypt	31
Greece	29
Bronze medal game
31 August
Algeria	36
Portugal	33

=== Semifinals ===
29 August 2026; 17:30	Egypt	27–25	Algeria	Palazzetto dello Sport, Fasano; Referees: Othmen Azzabi, Aymen Beb Abdellatif (TUN)
29 August 2026; 17:30	Mahmoud 5	(14–12)	Bounab 8	Palazzetto dello Sport, Fasano; Referees: Othmen Azzabi, Aymen Beb Abdellatif (TUN)
29 August 2026; 17:30	3× (suspension)	Report	4× (suspension)	Palazzetto dello Sport, Fasano; Referees: Othmen Azzabi, Aymen Beb Abdellatif (TUN)

29 August 2026; 20:00	Greece	32–30	Portugal	Palazzetto dello Sport, Fasano; Referees: Maryna Duplii / Olena Karpushchenko (UKR)
29 August 2026; 20:00	Eleftheriadis, Pagiatis 7	(17–12)	Rodrigues 9	Palazzetto dello Sport, Fasano; Referees: Maryna Duplii / Olena Karpushchenko (UKR)
29 August 2026; 20:00	1× (yellow card) 5× (suspension) 1× (red card)	Report	4× (suspension)	Palazzetto dello Sport, Fasano; Referees: Maryna Duplii / Olena Karpushchenko (UKR)

=== Bronze medal game ===
31 August 2026
17:30
Algeria
36–33 (ET)
Portugal
Palazzetto dello Sport, Fasano
Referees: Maryna Duplii / Olena Karpushchenko (UKR)
Bounab, Naim 10
(19–20)
Fernandes 8
1× (yellow card) 3× (suspension)
Report
1× (yellow card) 3× (suspension)

FT: 30–30 ET: 6–3

=== Gold medal game ===
31 August 2026; 20:00	Egypt	31–29	Greece	Palazzetto dello Sport, Fasano; Referees: Pietro Monitillo, Francesco Simone (ITA)
31 August 2026; 20:00	Khaled 9	(17–17)	Stathis 8	Palazzetto dello Sport, Fasano; Referees: Pietro Monitillo, Francesco Simone (ITA)
31 August 2026; 20:00	2× (suspension)	Report	1× (yellow card) 4× (suspension)	Palazzetto dello Sport, Fasano; Referees: Pietro Monitillo, Francesco Simone (ITA)

== Final standings ==
Rank	Team
1st place, gold medalist(s)	Egypt
2nd place, silver medalist(s)	Greece
3rd place, bronze medalist(s)	Algeria
4	Portugal
5	Tunisia
6	Italy
7	Kosovo
8	Cyprus
