= Mislav Grgić =

Croatian scientist

- Born: Osijek, Croatia
- Citizenship: Croatian
- Education: University of Zagreb
- Awards: Bronze, Silver and Gold Medals "Josip Lončar" from FER (1997, 1999 and 2020) "Vera Johanides" award from the Croatian Academy of Engineering (2005) "Fran Bošnjaković" Award of the University of Zagreb (2017); City of Zagreb Award (2017); The Order of the Croatian Star with the Effigy of Ruđer Bošković (2019) The Croatian State Science Award (2019)
- Scientific career
- Fields: image compression, content-based image retrieval, face recognition, medical imaging, digital mammography, breast cancer, biometrics
- Workplaces: University of Zagreb
- Website: https://www.mislavgrgic.info/

Mislav Grgić (born in 1973 in Osijek, Croatia) is a university professor, scientist, Ph.D. in technical sciences, and electrical engineer. He served as a Dean of FER from 2014 until 2018. He was the Head of the Alumni Community of FER from 2018 until 2022, and he was a Special Advisor to the Rector of the University of Zagreb for STEM Disciplines and International Projects from 2015 until 2022. He is a full member of the Academia Europaea - The Academy of Europe and a full member of the Croatian Academy of Engineering. He was a science advisor to the President of the Management Board of Končar - Electrical Industry.

== Biography ==
Mislav Grgić was born in 1973 in Osijek, Croatia. He received B.Sc., M.Sc., and Ph.D. degrees in electrical engineering from the University of Zagreb, Faculty of Electrical Engineering and Computing (FER), Zagreb, Croatia, in 1997, 1998, and 2000, respectively.

He has been working at the Department of Communication and Space Technologies at FER since July 1997.

Mislav Grgić was an editor of four books. In 2020, he had an h-index of 33.

== Academic activities ==
Mislav Grgić was a dean of the Faculty of Electrical Engineering and Computing (FER), University of Zagreb, Croatia (2014-2018; the youngest ever elected dean), and a vice dean for research of FER (2010-2014). He was a head of the alumni community, with more than 20,000 members (2018-2022). He was a special advisor to the rector of the University of Zagreb for STEM disciplines and international projects (2015-2022).

He was a deputy president of the "Energy Platform Living Lab - Association for Open Innovations in Energy Sector" (2014-2018), and a president of the board of directors of institution "Innovation Center Nikola Tesla" (2015-2018).

Mislav Grgić conducted a project that resulted in creation of the "SCface - Surveillance Cameras Face Database" which tests facial recognition systems.

Mislav Grgić created "Face Recognition Homepage", a website for facial recognition researchers.

== Scientific and professional organizations ==
Mislav Grgić has been elected as a Full Member of the Academia Europaea - The Academy of Europe since July 2019.

He is a member of the Croatian Academy of Engineering (HATZ)

He served as a Chair of the IEEE Croatia Section (2013-2016),

He was a member of the Working Group for the preparation of negotiations for the accession of the Republic of Croatia to the European Union, responsible for the Chapter 10 of the acquis communautaire: "Information Society and Media" (2005-2008). He was an appointed member of the Committee on Transportation, Communications and Maritime Affairs of the Croatian Parliament (2008-2011)

== Honors and awards ==
- 2020 "Josip Loncar" gold medal of the Faculty of Electrical Engineering and Computing, University of Zagreb for the great contribution to the development and successful management of the Faculty, for a scientific contribution in the field of digital image processing and multimedia communications, for the popularization of science and for the general enhancement of the reputation of the Faculty through its scientific research and professional work;
- 2019 The Croatian State Science Award for 2018 for popularization of technical sciences (with three co-awardees), presented in Croatian Parliament;
- 2019 The Order of the Croatian Star with the Effigy of Ruđer Bošković for extraordinary service in scientific work, popularization of science and attracting international projects, awarded by H. E. Mrs. Kolinda Grabar-Kitarović, President of Republic of Croatia;
- 2017 IEEE Croatia Section Distinguished Service Award for longtime contribution towards successful activities and international promotion of the IEEE Croatia Section, especially during his terms as a Chair of the IEEE Croatia Section from 2013 until 2016;
- 2017 The highest award in the field of technical sciences of the University of Zagreb - "Fran Bošnjaković" Award - for notable results in scientific, teaching and professional work and the promotion of scientific discipline and profession;
- 2017 The highest award of the City of Zagreb for great contribution to scientific work and activities in Zagreb;
- 2016 Special Recognition of the Rector of the University of Zagreb for committed and engaged work in university committees and boards and for foundation and development of the strategic investment project "Innovation Center Nikola Tesla" at the University of Zagreb;
- 2015 Medal of the Electric Traction Division of the Warsaw University of Technology on the 90th Anniversary of Electric Traction Teaching at the Warsaw University of Technology;
- 2005 Young scientist award "Vera Johanides" of the Croatian Academy of Engineering (HATZ) for scientific achievements in the area of multimedia communications;
- 1999-2000 "The British Scholarship Trust" fellowship;
- 1999 "Josip Loncar" silver medal of the Faculty of Electrical Engineering and Computing, University of Zagreb for the outstanding M.Sc. thesis work;
- 1997 "Josip Loncar" bronze medal of the Faculty of Electrical Engineering and Computing, University of Zagreb for the outstanding B.Sc. thesis work;
- 1994, 1995, 1996, and 1997 Rector's Award of University of Zagreb;
- 1994-1997 The City of Zagreb Merit Scholarship.

== Other activities ==
Mislav Grgić is a founder and first chair of the program "ŠUZA - From School to Science and Academic Community" - official FER's popularization program that is conducted in cooperation with elementary and secondary schools in Croatia. He is a co-founder and a president (prefect) of the Academic Male Choir of FER and Women Singing Choir "Rezonanca" of FER. He is an honorary member of the Croatian Singing Society "Slavulj" Petrinja.

He is a member of The Society of Brethren of the Croatian Dragonthe - as the Dragon Strossmayer's - where he is serving as 10th Grand Master (2021-2026), and he was also serving as a Herald - Head of the Dragons' Heraldic Office (2017-2019).

== Bibliography ==
- Google Scholar profile: https://scholar.google.com/citations?user=IyLtdscAAAAJ
- Scopus Author ID: https://www.scopus.com/authid/detail.uri?authorId=56234047900
- ResearcherID: http://www.researcherid.com/rid/B-6128-2008
- ORCID profile: http://orcid.org/0000-0001-6230-3734
