= Faroe Islands men's national handball team =

National handball team of Faroe Islands

Faroe Islands

Information
- Association: Handball Federation of the Faroe Islands
- Coach: Peter Bredsdorff-Larsen
- Assistant coach: Mark Lausen-Marcher; Hjalti Mohr Jacobsen
- Most caps: Hanus Joensen (250)
- Most goals: Hanus Joensen (60)

Colours
1st	2nd

Results

World Championship
- Appearances: 1 (First in 2027)

European Championship
- Appearances: 2 (First in 2024)
- Best result: 13th (2026)
- Last updated on 20 January 2025.

The Faroe Islands national handball team is the national handball team of Faroe Islands and is controlled by the Handball Federation of the Faroe Islands.

In June 2015, Faroe Islands competed in the 2015 IHF Emerging Nations Championship, and won the championship. In June 2017, Faroe Islands competed in the 2017 IHF Emerging Nations Championship, and once again won the championship. At the 2019 edition, unlike the previous ones, Europe was represented only by the teams who competed at the first phase of 2022 European Championship qualification and failed to advance to the Relegation Round. That implied Faroe Islands not to defend their title.

Later in the same qualification process, Faroe Islands qualified for the 2024 European Men's Handball Championship, in which they participated in the Men's EHF Euro for the first time, becoming the second team (after Latvia in 2020) to have qualified for the European Championship after previously having played in the Emerging Nations Championship. They accomplished a draw against Norway, who had been bronze medalists at the 2020 European Championship four years earlier.

At the 2026 European Men's Handball Championship they recorded their first win ever when they beat Montenegro 37-24.

Faroe Islands are to make their World Men's Handball Championship debut in 2027.

For the Olympic Games, Faroe Islands players are eligible to be selected to the Denmark men's national handball team, but no players have been called up to that squad as of August 2024.

== Competitive record ==
=== World Championships ===
World Championship record
Year	Round	Position	GP	W	D	L	GS	GA
(West Germany) 1982	did not qualify							
(Switzerland) 1986	did not qualify							
(Czechoslovakia) 1990	did not qualify							
(Sweden) 1993	did not qualify							
(Iceland) 1995	did not qualify							
(Japan) 1997	did not qualify							
(Egypt) 1999	did not qualify							
(France) 2001	did not qualify							
(Portugal) 2003	did not qualify							
(Tunisia) 2005	did not qualify							
(Germany) 2007	did not qualify							
(Croatia) 2009	did not qualify							
(Sweden) 2011	did not qualify							
(Spain) 2013	did not qualify							
(Qatar) 2015	did not qualify							
(France) 2017	did not qualify							
(Denmark) (Germany) 2019	did not qualify							
(Egypt) 2021	did not qualify							
(Poland) (Sweden) 2023	did not qualify							
(Croatia) (Denmark) (Norway) 2025	did not qualify							
(Germany) 2027	qualified							
(France) (Germany) 2029	to be determined							
(Denmark) (Iceland) (Norway) 2031	to be determined							
Total	1/23	–	0	0	0	0	0	0

=== European Championship ===
European Championship record
Year	Round	Position	GP	W	D	L	GS	GA
(Portugal) 1994	Did not qualify							
(Spain) 1996	Did not qualify							
(Italy) 1998	Did not qualify							
(Croatia) 2000	Did not qualify							
(Sweden) 2002	Did not qualify							
(Slovenia) 2004	Did not qualify							
(Switzerland) 2006	Did not qualify							
(Norway) 2008	Did not qualify							
(Austria) 2010	Did not qualify							
(Serbia) 2012	Did not qualify							
(Denmark) 2014	Did not qualify							
(Poland) 2016	Did not qualify							
(Croatia) 2018	Did not qualify							
(Austria) (Norway) (Sweden) 2020	Did not qualify							
(Hungary) (Slovakia) 2022	Did not qualify							
(Germany) 2024	Preliminary round	20th	3	0	1	2	83	90
(Denmark) (Norway) (Sweden) 2026	Preliminary round	13th	3	1	1	1	92	82
(Portugal) (Spain) (Switzerland) 2028	To be determined							
(Czech Republic) (Denmark) (Poland) 2030	To be determined							
(France) (Germany) 2032	To be determined							
Total	2/20	0 titles	6	1	2	3	175	172

=== IHF Emerging Nations Championship ===
- 2015 – 1st place
- 2017 – 1st place

== Current squad ==
The squad for the 2026 European Men's Handball Championship.

Head coach: Peter Bredsdorff-Larsen

No.	Pos.	Name	Date of birth (age)	Height	App.	Goals	Club
1	GK	Pauli Jacobsen	11 July 2002 (age 23)	1.82 m	32	0	(Denmark) HØJ Elite
2	P	Helgi Hoydal	1 May 1996 (age 30)	1.88 m	45	54	(Faroe Islands) H71
4	LB	Bjarni í Selvindi	27 August 2002 (age 23)	1.89 m	10	8	(Iceland) Valur
6	LW	Leivur Mortensen	25 March 1999 (age 27)	1.85 m	32	63	(Denmark) Frederiksberg IF
7	RW	Allan Norðberg	25 March 1994 (age 32)	1.87 m	46	76	(Iceland) Valur Reykjavík
8	P	Pætur Mikkjalsson	11 May 1997 (age 29)	1.90 m	29	22	(Denmark) Team Sydhavsøerne
9	LW	Rói Berg Hansen	11 April 1996 (age 30)	1.82 m	49	83	(Denmark) Køge Håndbold
10	RB	Kjartan Johansen	17 April 1996 (age 30)	1.90 m	53	90	(Denmark) Vendsyssel Håndbold
12	GK	Tórður Skorheim Guttesen	15 November 1997 (age 28)	1.88 m	10	0	(Faroe Islands) Kyndil
17	RW	Hákun West Av Teigum	19 February 2002 (age 24)	1.89 m	37	206	(Germany) Füchse Berlin
25	RB	Vilhelm Poulsen	20 August 1999 (age 26)	1.90 m	41	76	(Germany) TSV Hannover-Burgdorf
30	LB	Tróndur Mikkelsen	1 July 2000 (age 25)	1.90 m	32	46	(Sweden) HF Karlskrona
47	P	Ísak Vedelsbøl	18 October 2004 (age 21)	1.97 m	16	24	(Sweden) IK Sävehof
61	LB	Pauli Mittún	30 May 2002 (age 24)	1.88 m	29	26	(Denmark) Team Sydhavsøerne
71	CB	Elias Ellefsen á Skipagøtu	19 May 2002 (age 24)	1.87 m	28	186	(Germany) THW Kiel
75	CB	Rói Ellefsen á Skipagøtu	10 October 2003 (age 22)	1.84 m	20	23	(Sweden) IF Hallby
78	LB	Óli Mittún	10 June 2005 (age 21)	1.88 m	24	101	(Denmark) GOG Håndbold
79	P	Teis Horn Rasmussen	31 March 1996 (age 30)	1.95 m	41	84	(Denmark) Ribe-Esbjerg HH

== See also ==
- Faroe Islands women's national handball team
