= Italy men's national handball team =

Italy

Information
- Association: Italian Handball Federation
- Coach: Bob Hanning
- Assistant coach: Jürgen Prantner

Colours
1st	2nd

Results

World Championship
- Appearances: 3 (First in 1997)
- Best result: 16th (2025)

European Championship
- Appearances: 2 (First in 1998)
- Best result: 11th (1998)
- Last updated on Unknown.

The Italy national handball team is the national handball team of Italy. It only had 1 appearance in World championship 1997, and the next year hosted the European Championship (in both times coached by Lino Červar). It had poor result in both competitions. It never qualified for the Olympic Games. As of 2026, after a long hiatus, the Azzurri qualified for three major competitions in a row (IHF 2025, EHF 2026 and IHF 2027).

== Competitive record ==
=== World Championship ===
World Championship record
Year	Round	Position	GP	W	D	L	GS	GA
(Nazi Germany) 1938	did not qualify							
(Sweden) 1954	did not qualify							
(East Germany) 1958	did not qualify							
(West Germany) 1961	did not qualify							
(Czechoslovakia) 1964	did not qualify							
(Sweden) 1967	did not qualify							
(France) 1970	did not qualify							
(East Germany) 1974	did not qualify							
(Denmark) 1978	did not qualify							
(West Germany) 1982	did not qualify							
(Switzerland) 1986	did not qualify							
(Czechoslovakia) 1990	did not qualify							
(Sweden) 1993	did not qualify							
(Iceland) 1995	did not qualify							
(Japan) 1997	Preliminary round	18	5	1	1	3	100	105
(Egypt) 1999	did not qualify							
(France) 2001	did not qualify							
(Portugal) 2003	did not qualify							
(Tunisia) 2005	did not qualify							
(Germany) 2007	did not qualify							
(Croatia) 2009	did not qualify							
(Sweden) 2011	did not qualify							
(Spain) 2013	did not qualify							
(Qatar) 2015	did not qualify							
(France) 2017	did not qualify							
(Denmark) / (Germany) 2019	did not qualify							
(Egypt) 2021	did not qualify							
(Poland) / (Sweden) 2023	did not qualify							
(Croatia) / (Denmark) / (Norway) 2025	Main round	16	6	3	0	3	161	172
(Germany) 2027	qualified							
(France) / (Germany) 2029	to be determined							
(Denmark) / (Iceland) / (Norway) 2031	to be determined							
Total	3/32	–	11	3	3	5	261	277

=== European Championship ===
European Championship record
Year	Round	Position	GP	W	D	L	GS	GA
(Portugal) 1994	did not qualify							
(Spain) 1996	did not qualify							
(Italy) 1998	Preliminary round	11	6	2	0	4	133	148
(Croatia) 2000	did not qualify							
(Sweden) 2002	did not qualify							
(Slovenia) 2004	did not qualify							
(Switzerland) 2006	did not qualify							
(Norway) 2008	did not qualify							
(Austria) 2010	did not qualify							
(Serbia) 2012	did not qualify							
(Denmark) 2014	did not qualify							
(Poland) 2016	did not qualify							
(Croatia) 2018	did not qualify							
(Austria) (Norway) (Sweden) 2020	did not qualify							
(Hungary) / (Slovakia) 2022	did not qualify							
(Germany) 2024	did not qualify							
(Denmark) (Norway) (Sweden) 2026	Preliminary round	18th	3	1	0	2	81	99
(Portugal) / (Spain) / (Switzerland) 2028	To be determined							
(Czech Republic) (Denmark) (Poland) 2030	To be determined							
(France) (Germany) 2032	To be determined							
Total	2/20	–	9	3	0	6	214	247

=== Mediterranean Games ===
- 1979 – 2nd
- 1991 – 3rd
- 1997 – 2nd
- 2013 – 4th
- 2018 – 10th
- 2022 – 7th
- 2026 – 6th

== Team ==
=== Current squad ===
The squad for the 2026 European Men's Handball Championship.

Head coach: (Germany) Bob Hanning

No.	Pos.	Name	Date of birth (age)	Height	App.	Goals	Club
1	GK	Domenico Ebner	26 April 1994 (age 32)	1.92 m	70	10	(Germany) SC DHfK Leipzig
2	RW	Leo Prantner	24 November 2001 (age 24)	1.78 m	45	42	(Germany) Füchse Berlin
5	LW	Gianluca Dapiran	9 May 1994 (age 32)	1.93 m	80	88	(Italy) Cassano Magnago HC
6	LB	Davide Bulzamini	3 February 1995 (age 31)	1.94 m	93	115	(Germany) 1. VfL Potsdam
8	CB	Giacomo Savini	19 May 1998 (age 28)	1.85 m	80	57	(Italy) Cassano Magnago HC
9	P	Gabriele Sontacchi	19 September 2003 (age 23)	1.90 m	18	9	(Germany) 1. VfL Potsdam
10	CB	Marco Mengon	3 January 2000 (age 26)	1.92 m	62	109	(Germany) 1. VfL Potsdam
11	RW	Nicolo D'Antino	22 June 1999 (age 27)	1.72 m	55	43	(Spain) BM Atlético Valladolid
15	LB	Simone Mengon	3 January 2000 (age 26)	1.92 m	54	99	(Germany) TVB Stuttgart
19	RB	Thomas Bortoli	20 February 2002 (age 24)	1.94 m	56	60	(France) Istres Provence Handball
20	RB	Davide Pugliese	12 June 2001 (age 25)	1.87 m	14	4	(Spain) Club Balonmano Nava
23	LB	Christian Manojlovic	14 August 2005 (age 21)	1.87 m	25	22	(Romania) SCM Politehnica Timișoara
24	LB	Mikael Helmersson	29 September 2003 (age 23)	1.99 m	23	44	(Germany) HSC 2000 Coburg
29	LW	Jeremi Pirani	18 January 1994 (age 32)	1.78 m	17	23	(France) Tremblay Handball
30	P	Tommaso Romei	30 March 2003 (age 23)	1.90 m	23	15	(Austria) Bregenz Handball
32	P	Andrea Parisini	18 November 1994 (age 31)	1.94 m	109	183	(France) Limoges Handball
40	LW	Simon Sirot	18 April 2007 (age 19)	1.78 m	3	1	(Germany) Füchse Berlin
51	GK	Pau Panitti	18 July 2004 (age 22)	1.95 m	2	0	(Spain) Club Balonmano Granollers
90	GK	Giovanni Pavani	3 August 2000 (age 26)	1.84 m	16	0	(Italy) Handball Sassari

=== Former head coaches ===
- Lino Červar
- Francisco Javier Equisoain Azanza “Zupo“

=== Notable players ===
- Settimio Massotti (1360 goals in 302 international caps)
- Alessandro Tarafino (14 times Italian Serie A Champion)
- Zaim Kobilica
- Franco Chionchio
- Alessandro Fusina
- Ivan Mestriner
- Marcello “Air” Montalto
- Tin Tokic

== See also ==
- Italy women's national handball team
