= Bogdan Rață =

Romanian sculptor (born 1984)

- Born: 22 January 1984; Baia Mare, Romania
- Education: West University of Timișoara; Bucharest National University of Arts
- Known for: Sculpture
- Notable work: Scream (2008); Pray (2009); Lonely (2011); The Middle Way (2014)
- Awards: Prize for Sculpture of The Union of Romania Plastic Artists (2011)

Bogdan Rață (Romanian: [boɡdan rat̻͡s̪a]; born January 22, 1984) is a Romanian sculptor best known for his twisted, contorted and mutated versions of the human body. Rață lives and works in Timișoara and Bucharest.

== Education ==
Rața studied sculpture at the West University of Timișoara (2003–2006). In 2008 he got his M.A. in sculpture at the Bucharest National University of Arts and in 2012 his PhD at the West University of Timișoara.

== Work ==
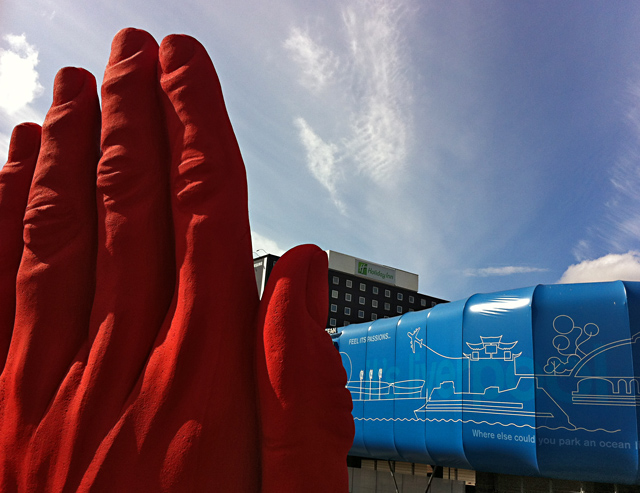
Bogdan Rață, The Middle Way (2014), placed in front of St. George's Hall within Independents Liverpool Biennial 2014. The sculpture is 3.5 meters high and is made of polyester / polystyrene, synthetic resin, fiberglass, and paint.

In his early years of Rață's artistic work he used his own body as a model. Subsequently, he continued his work in the form of large-scale studies of different body fragments; with quasi-surgical accuracy, he carved out his arms, feet, elbows and torsos, which he later juxtaposed, juggling with sometimes oversized proportions such as Handgun, exhibited in Bucharest and later in Paris at the Farideh Cadot Gallery. The combinations give rise to new forms, hybrid and often "absurd" sculptures.

Rață is focused mainly on human anatoforms. Using polyester, paint, metal, and synthetic resin he twists, deforms, and shapes human bodies forming hybrid and grotesque anatomic mutations.

His works represents deformed and hideous human bodies or parts of it. Rață is interested in the issues of perception and human figure in sculpture:

I work with human fragments which I combine in order to create images with a strong emotional impact: frustration, fright, shame. I reinterpret the human body precisely in order to induce a state of confusion to the reader and to in a way force him to understand, from a different perspective, the contemporary human being. A finger can be stronger than a rifle, an ear more frustrating than an interrogation.

Often, he mixes different body parts like fingers, foot, head and torsos: Punk (2008), Torsso (2008), Lonely (2011), The Cure (2010), Tits (2010), The Middle Way (2014), The Pressure (2015) etc. He also uses twisted trunks or faceless bodies: Shame (2009), Trying to Keep Life (2012) and The Lake (2015).

=== Teaching ===
Besides his artistic career, Rață is also a lecturer at the West University of Timișoara.

== Exhibitions ==
Since 2007, Rață's work has been exhibited both nationally, in Timișoara, Bucharest, Sibiu, Baia Mare and internationally in Liverpool (UK), Paris (France), New York (U.S.), Moscow and St. Petersburg (Russia), Venice (Italy), Tel Aviv (Israel), Cascais (Portugal) and Budapest (Hungary).
