= 2029 World Men's Handball Championship =

Championnat du monde masculin de handball 2029 (in French) Handball-Weltmeisterschaft der Männer 2029 (in German)

Tournament details
- Host countries: France; Germany
- Dates: 17 January–4 February
- Teams: 32 (from 5 confederations)

The 2029 IHF World Men's Handball Championship, will be the 31st event hosted by the International Handball Federation. It will take place in France and Germany from 17 January to 4 February 2029.

== Bidding process ==
In April 2023, the IHF stated that they were looking for bids. In the end, three bids expressed interest in hosting the tournament.

- Denmark/Iceland/Norway
- France/Germany (formerly with Switzerland)
- Saudi Arabia

The bids were confirmed on 1 March 2024:

- Denmark/Iceland/Norway
- France/Germany

France and Germany were given the hosting rights on 16 April 2024 in Créteil, France.

== Venues ==
On 5 November 2026, the venues were announced. For France, only the host cities have been confirmed; the specific venues are yet to be announced.

Germany:

- Berlin - Uber Arena (opening match)
- Hamburg - Barclays Arena
- Cologne - Lanxess Arena

France:

- Lyon
- Paris (finals)
- Strasbourg

During the bidding phase, the associations had proposed the following venues:

- (France) Paris – Plenitude Arena, capacity 25,000
- (France) Paris – Accor Arena, capacity 14,000
- (France) Lyon – LDLC Arena, capacity 10,000
- (France) Strasbourg – Rhénus Sport, capacity 8,000
- (Germany) Cologne – Lanxess Arena, capacity 20,000
- (Germany) Stuttgart – Porsche-Arena, capacity 6,200
- (Germany) Düsseldorf – PSD Bank Dome, capacity 11,600
- (Germany) Mannheim – SAP Arena, capacity 15,000

During the bid three venues for each nation were proposed, with the finals at Paris La Défense Arena, although Germany and France opened the door for a possible third co-host country.

== Qualification ==
Qualification system will still depend on number of compulsory and performance places, as for 2027 World Championship. The World Championship hosts will be directly qualified, along with the reigning world champions. The number of compulsory places awarded to other continental confederation keeps unchanged and is divided as follows: four places each for Europe, Asia and Africa, three places for the South and Central America zone and one place for the North America and Caribbean zone. One additional place is available for Oceania, but only when that region's national team ranks fifth or higher at the Asian Championship. If no Oceania team places among the top five at the Asian Championship, the IHF will award an additional wild card. In addition, there will be 12 performance places for the continental confederations, which are based on the teams ranked 1–12 in the preceding World Championship. According to the new qualification system and taking into consideration the results of the 2027 Men's World Championship, 20 out of 32 places are distributed as follows:

Distribution of places (following current IHF rules)	Vacancies	Details	Comments
Organisers ^{1}	1		
Reigning world champion ^{2}	1		
Performance places for the continental confederations	12		Based on teams ranked 1–12 in the preceding world championship
Africa		?	
Asia		?	
Europe		?	
North America and the Caribbean		?	
South and Central America		?	
Oceania		?	
Compulsory places for the continental confederations	17		
Africa		4	
Asia		4	
Europe		4 ^{1}	
North America and the Caribbean		1	
South and Central America		3	
Oceania		1 ^{3}	Place allocated to Oceania or an additional free wild card
Wild card ^{4}	1		
Total	32		

^{1}All hosting federations are automatically entitled to take part in the World Championship. If there is more than one organiser from the same continental confederation, the number of compulsory places of the respective confederation shall be reduced accordingly. If there is more than one organiser and the organisers are not from the same confederation, the IHF Council shall decide about the reduction of the compulsory places, considering only the compulsory places of the confederations involved.
^{2}The reigning world champion automatically qualifies for the next World Championship and, as a rule, is placed first in the first performance row. In case the reigning world champion is also hosting the next World Championship, the confederation of the reigning world champion obtains one additional performance place.
^{3}The compulsory place for Oceania is subject to fulfilling certain conditions. The continental confederation of Oceania does not have a direct compulsory place for a confederational qualification event. The confederation of Oceania is invited to participate in the Asian qualification events. The compulsory place is awarded to Oceania if the representative from Oceania is ranked 5th or higher in the Asian qualification. If Oceania fails to rank 5th or does not participate, the IHF Council will award this place as a free wild card.
^{4}The wild card shall be awarded by the IHF Council.

Competition	Dates	Host	Vacancies	Qualified
Host nations	16 April 2024	(France) Créteil	2	France; Germany
2027 World Championship	13 – 31 January	Germany	1	
2028 European Men's Handball Championship	13 – 31 January 2028	Portugal; Spain; Switzerland	3	
2028 African Men's Handball Championship	TBD	TBD	4(+?)	
2028 Asian Men's Handball Championship	TBD	TBD	4(+?)	
2028 South and Central American Men's Handball Championship	TBD	TBD	3(+?)	
2028 Nor.Ca. Men's Handball Championship	TBD	TBD	1(+?)	
European qualification	TBD	Various	?	
Oceania	TBD	TBD	1	
Wild card	TBD	TBD	1 or 2^{[1]}	

1. If countries from Oceania (Australia or New Zealand) participating in the Asian Championships finish within the top 5, they will qualify for the World Championships. If they finish placed sixth or lower, the place would have been transferred to the wild card spot.

=== Qualified teams ===
Team	Qualification method	Date of qualification	Appearance(s)				Previous best performance (Note: Bold text indicates they hosted that edition.)
Team	Qualification method	Date of qualification	Total	First	Last	Streak	Previous best performance
France	Co-host nation	16 April 2024	25th	1954	2025	20	**Champions** (1995, **2001**, 2009, 2011, 2015, **2017**)
Germany	Co-host nation	16 April 2024	30th (Note: Previously competed as West Germany from 1954 to 1986. From both German teams only East Germany was qualified in 1990.)	1938	2027	16	**Champions** (**1938**, 1978, **2007**)
