= 1967 World Men's Handball Championship =

6th Men's Handball World Championship

Tournament details
- Host country: Sweden
- Dates: 12-21 January
- Teams: 16

Final positions
- Champions: Czechoslovakia
- Runners-up: Denmark
- Third place: Romania

Tournament statistics
- Matches played: 36
- Goals scored: 1,338 (37.17 per match)
- Top scorer: (West Germany) Herbert Lübking 38

The 1967 World Men's Handball Championship was the sixth team handball World Championship. It was held in Sweden. Czechoslovakia won the championship.

== Results ==
=== Preliminary round ===
GROUP A

Date	Venue	Matches	Res.	Half
12 January	Malmö	Sweden - Poland	26-16	(9-7)
12 January	Hälsingborg	Yugoslavia - Switzerland	26-11	(16-3)
13 January	Kristianstad	Sweden - Switzerland	19-16	(10-8)
13 January	Lund	Yugoslavia - Poland	22-17	(14-8)
15 January	Malmö	Yugoslavia - Sweden	21-17	(8-9)
15 January	Landskrona	Poland - Switzerland	20-18	(12-11)

Group A	Games	Goals	Points
Yugoslavia	3	69-45	6
Sweden	3	62-53	4
Poland	3	53-66	2
Switzerland	3	45-65	0

GROUP B

Date	Venue	Matches	Res.	Half
12 January	Luleå	West Germany - Norway	22-16	(12.9)
12 January	Kiruna	Hungary - Japan	30-25	(16-14)
13 January	Kiruna	West Germany - Japan	38-27	(17-12)
13 January	Malmberget	Hungary - Norway	15-11	(7-7)
15 January	Malmberget	West Germany - Hungary	29-23	(17-13)
15 January	Luleå	Japan - Norway	21-17	(11-7)

Group B	Games	Goals	Points
West Germany	3	89-66	6
Hungary	3	68-65	4
Japan	3	73-85	2
Norway	3	44-58	0

GROUP C

Date	Venue	Matches	Res.	Half
12 Jan	Stockholm	Romania - East Germany	14-14	(7-7)
12 January	Örebro	USSR - Canada	28-9	(17-4)
13 January	Eskilstuna	USSR - East Germany	22-17	(12-8)
13 January	Borlänge	Romania - Canada	27-3	(9-1)
15 January	Stockholm	Romania - USSR	15-13	(7-9)
15 January	Köping	East Germany - Canada	37-6	(20-3)

Group C	Games	Goals	Points
Romania	3	56-30	5
Soviet Union	3	63-41	4
East Germany	3	68-42	3
Canada	3	18-92	0

GROUP D

Date	Venue	Matches	Res.	Half
12 January	Göteborg	Czechoslovakia - France	25-10	(10-2)
12 January	Vänersborg	Denmark - Tunisia	27-6	(16-4)
13 January	Falköping	Czechoslovakia - Tunisia	23-10	(13-4)
13 January	Halmstad	Denmark - France	9-8	(2-3)
15 January	Hälsingborg	Czechoslovakia - Denmark	24-14	(13-7)
15 January	Skara	France - Tunisia	16-7	(7-4)

Group D	Games	Goals	Points
Czechoslovakia	3	72-34	6
Denmark	3	50-38	4
France	3	34-41	2
Tunisia	3	23-66	0

=== Main round ===
The top two teams from each group progressed to the quarter-finals. The four quarter final winners progressed to the semi-finals, while losers played for positions 5-8.

Date	Venue	Matches	Res.	Half
Quarter-finals
17 January	Kristianstad	Denmark - Yugoslavia	14-13	(6-5)
17 January	Stockholm	USSR - West Germany	19-16	(10-7)
17 January	Hälsingborg	Czechoslovakia - Sweden	18-11	(9-3)
17 January	Linköping	Romania - Hungary	20-19	(13-12)
Semi-finals
18 January	Västerås	Czechoslovakia - Romania	19-17	(11-10)
18 January	Västerås	Denmark - USSR	17-12	(9-8)
Bronze medal game
21 January	Västerås	Romania - USSR	21-19• ET 19-19	(8-11)
Final
21 January	Västerås	Czechoslovakia - Denmark	14-11	(8-8)
• After extra time.

==== 5–8 place ====
Date	Venue	Matches	Res.	Half
Semi-final Round
18 January	Göteborg	West Germany- Yugoslavia	31-30• ET 24-24	(14-12)
18 January	Karlskrona	Sweden - Hungary	21-19	(10-11)
7-8 place
20 January	Eskilstuna	Yugoslavia - Hungary	24-20	(9-10)
5-6 place
20 January	Eskilstuna	Sweden - West Germany	24-22	(12-10)
• After extra time.

== Final standings ==
Rank	Team
Gold medal	Czechoslovakia
Silver medal	Denmark
Bronze medal	Romania
4	Soviet Union
5	Sweden
6	West Germany
7	Yugoslavia
8	Hungary
9	East Germany
10	France
11	Japan
12	Poland
13	Norway
14	Switzerland
15	Tunisia
16	Canada
