= Sport in Romania =

Sport in Romania is an important part of the country's culture. Romania has risen to prominence in a number of sporting areas in recent decades. Association football is the most popular sport in Romania, a nation of 20 million. The most successful club is Steaua Bucharest, who were the first Eastern European side to win the European Cup and the European Supercup in 1986. Romania is one of only four national teams from Europe that took part in the first World Cup in 1930. The Romania national football team has taken part in seven FIFA World Cups and had its most successful run during the 1990s, when they reached the quarterfinals of the 1994 FIFA World Cup, losing to Sweden in the penalty shootout. Romania was ranked third by FIFA in 1997.

Other popular sports include handball, volleyball, basketball, rugby union, tennis, and gymnastics. Many Romanian athletes have achieved significant success and have won World and European championships in numerous sports during the years. Romania participated in the Olympic Games for the first time in 1900 and has taken part in 21 of the 28 summer games. It has been one of the more successful countries at the Summer Olympic Games, with a total of 307 medals won throughout the years, of which 89 gold ones, ranking 15th overall. Almost a quarter of all the medals, with 25 of them gold, were won in gymnastics. Romanian athletes have also won gold medals in other Olympic sports, such as rowing, athletics, canoeing, wrestling, shooting, fencing, swimming, discus throw, weightlifting, boxing, and judo.

== Team sports ==
=== Football ===
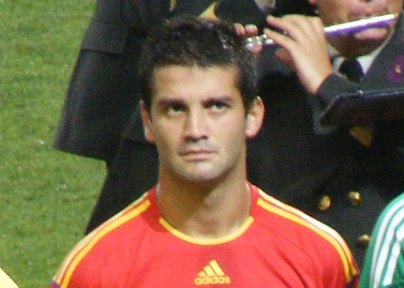
Cristian Chivu

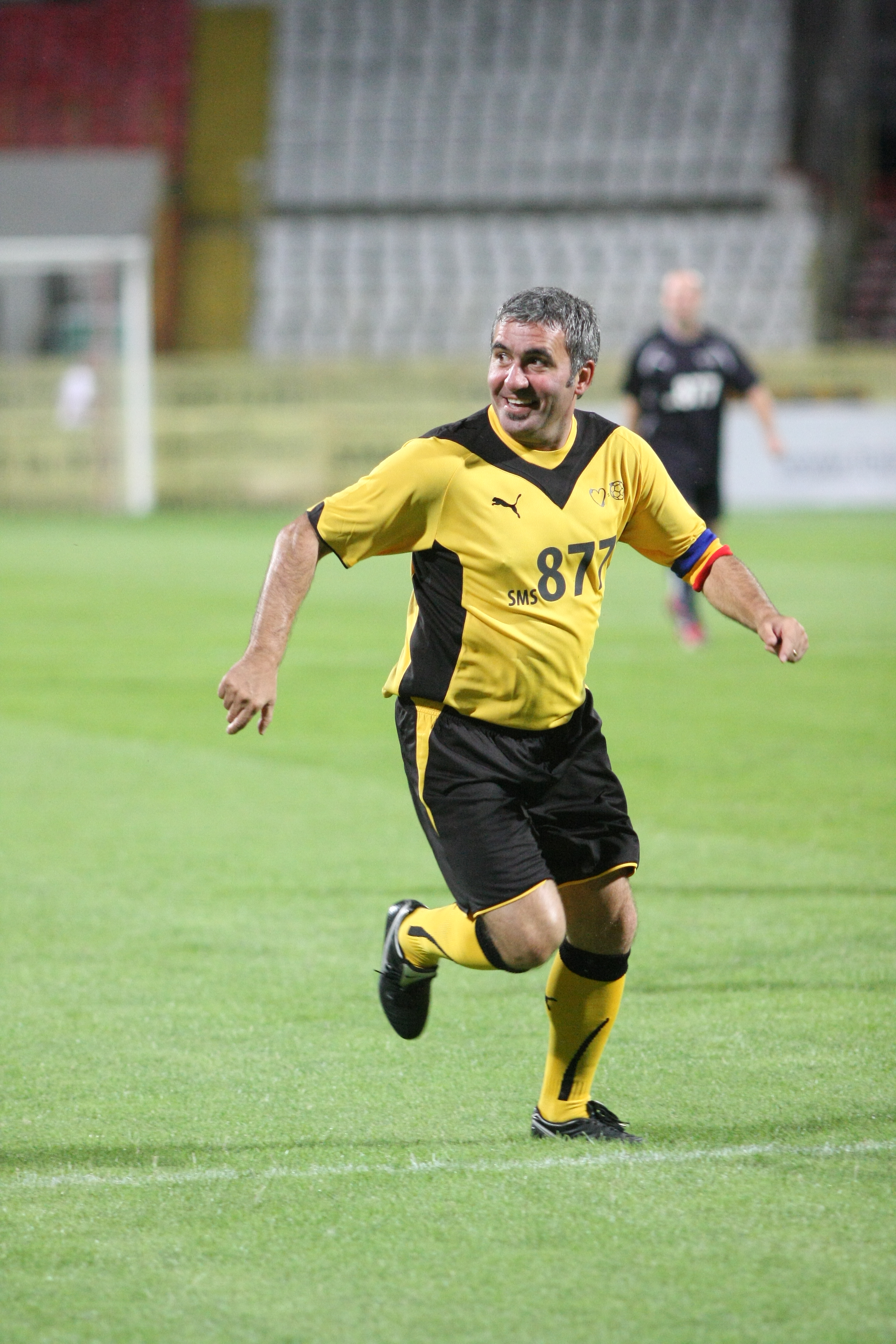
Gheorghe Hagi photographed in 2010

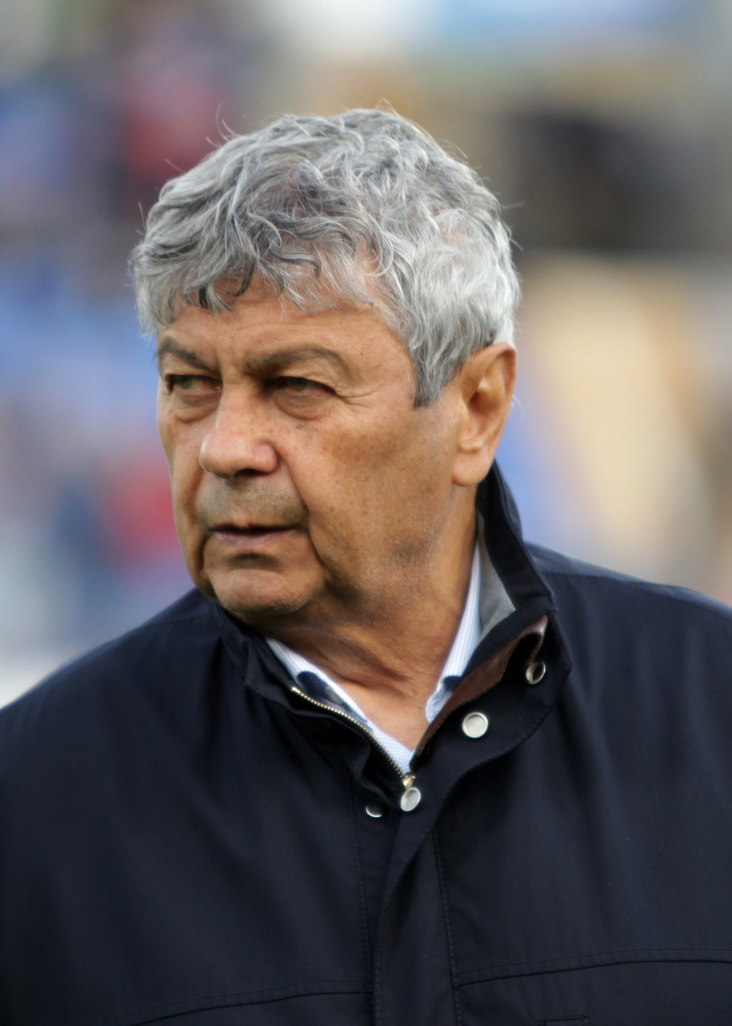
Mircea Lucescu photographed in 2017

Football is the most popular sport in Romania. The most internationally known Romanian player is Gheorghe Hagi, who played for Steaua București (Romania), Real Madrid, FC Barcelona (Spain), and Galatasaray (Turkey), among others. Other famous Romanian players include: Nicolae Dobrin, Ilie Balaci, Dudu Georgescu, Florea Dumitrache, Mircea Petescu, Dan Coe, Cornel Dinu, Marcel Răducanu, Mircea Lucescu, Anghel Iordănescu, Ion Dumitru, Rodion Cămătaru, Ladislau Boloni, Silviu Lung, Mircea Rednic, Gheorghe Popescu, Dan Petrescu, Constantin Gâlcă, Miodrag Belodedici, Dorinel Munteanu, Bogdan Stelea, Ioan Lupescu, Ilie Dumitrescu, Viorel Moldovan, Florin Răducioiu, Adrian Ilie, Bogdan Lobonț, Cosmin Contra, Cristian Chivu, Adrian Mutu, Răzvan Raț, Dorin Goian and Lucian Sânmărtean.

In 1986, the Romanian football club Steaua București became the first Eastern European club ever to win the prestigious European Champions Cup title. They reached the final again in 1989, but lost to A.C. Milan. Other important Romanian football clubs are Dinamo București, Universitatea Craiova, Rapid București, FC Argeș Pitești, FC Petrolul Ploiești, UTA Arad and FC Timişoara. The Romania national team has taken part in seven FIFA World Cups, and had its most successful run through the 1990s, reaching the quarter-finals of the 1994 FIFA World Cup in the United States, when the "Golden Generation" was at its best.

The National Arena Stadium in Bucharest hosted the 2012 UEFA Europa League Final.

=== Handball ===
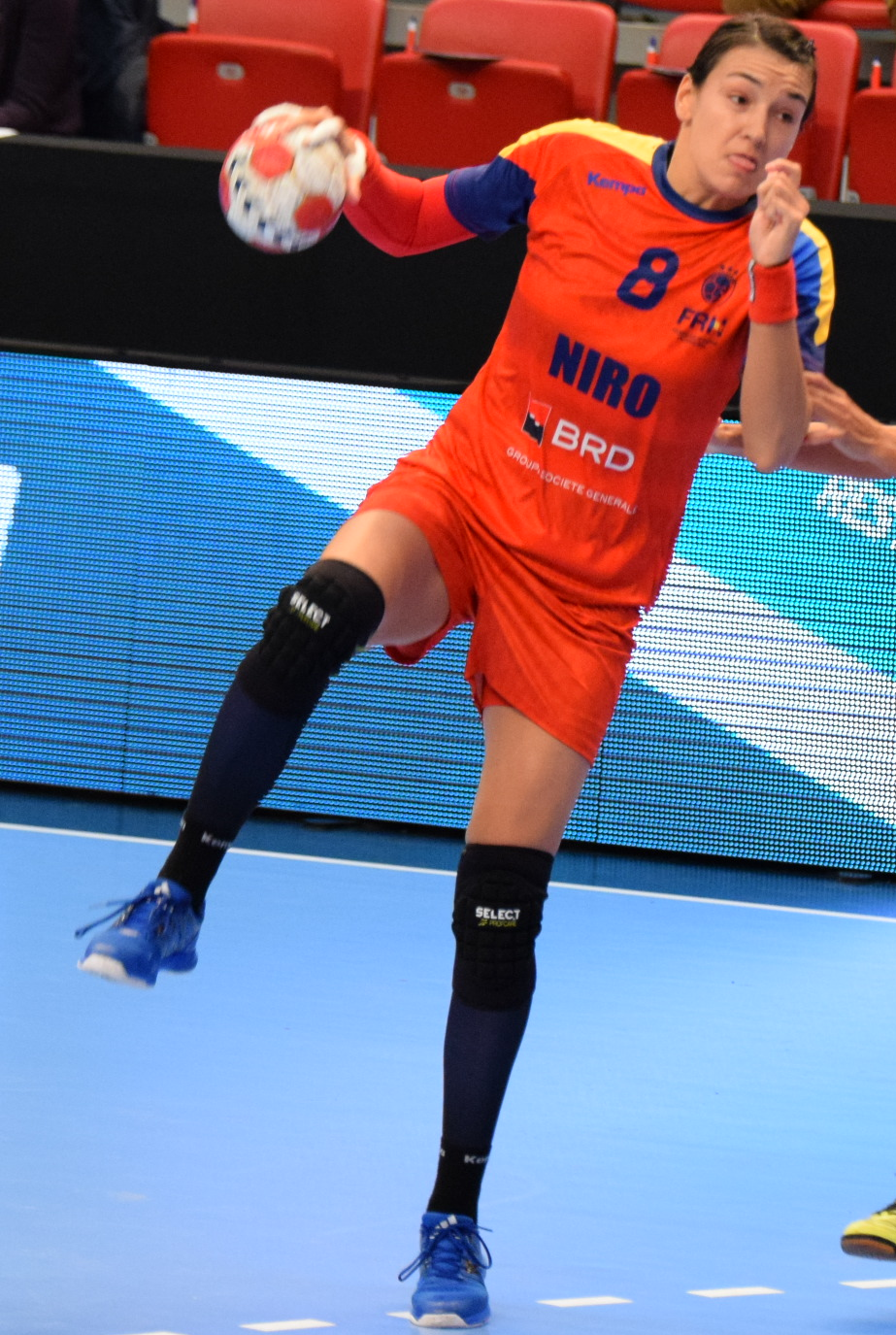
Cristina Neagu is the only female handball player in history to win four IHF World Player of the Year awards

Handball is one of the most popular sports in Romania. The Romania men's national handball team has won the Handball IHF World Cup four times (1961, 1964, 1970, and 1974). The only other team to have matched this record is Sweden in 1999 and France in 2011. The Romania women's national handball team has won the Handball World Cup in 1962. Steaua, Dinamo and CSM București have also won several European titles over the years.

Romania has produced many great handball players, including Gheorghe Gruia, Alexandru Dedu, Vasile Stângă, Mircea Costache II, Petre Ivănescu, Cornel Penu, Alexandru Buligan, Marian Dumitru, Cristian Gaţu and Cristian Zaharia.

On the women's side, the top Romanians include: four times IHF World Player of the Year winner Cristina Neagu, Luminița Dinu, Mariana Tîrcă, Narcisa Lecușanu, Valentina Elisei and Cristina Vărzaru.

=== Volleyball ===
Romania is represented by the men's and women's national volleyball teams, which are governed by Federaţia Română de Volei and take part in international volleyball competitions. Both the men's and women's teams have won several medals at international competitions over the years, especially in the 1950s and 1960s. The men's national volleyball team also won a bronze medal at the 1980 Olympics. Its most recent notable results include the Final 4 of the 2010 Men's European Volleyball League. The performance was also repeated in the next year.

At club level Dinamo București, Rapid and CSM București have won several European titles.

The city of Bucharest hosted the Final Four of the 2017–18 CEV Women's Champions League.

=== Basketball ===
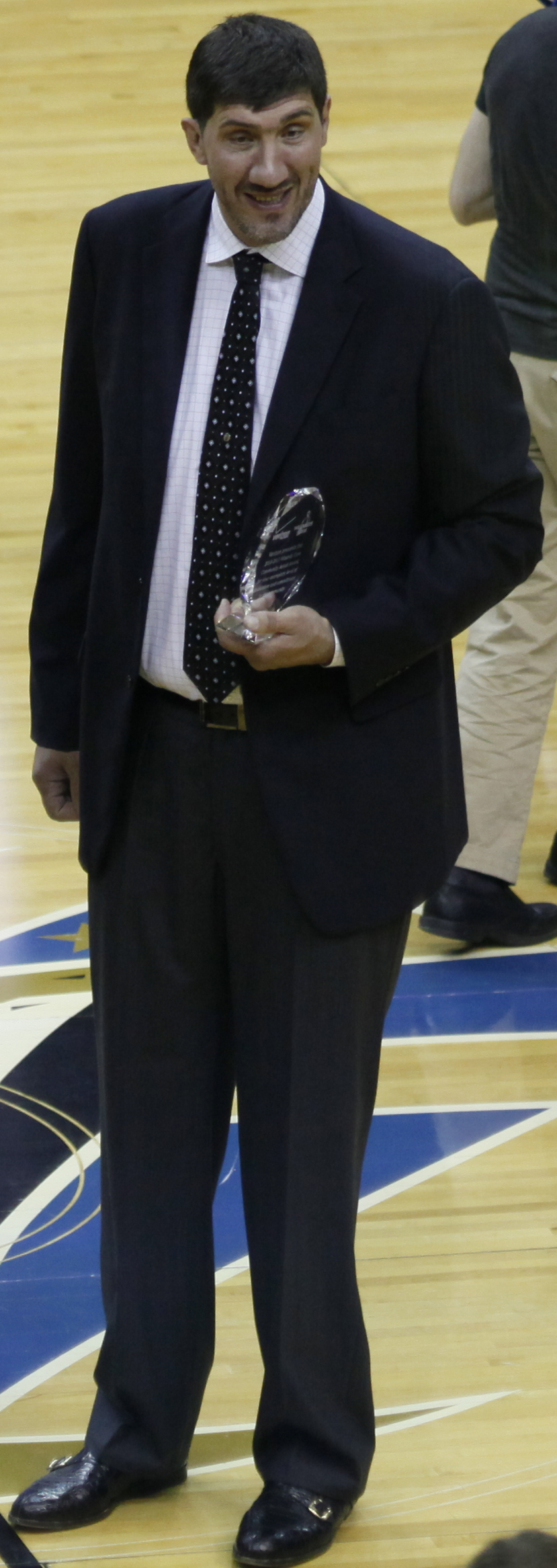
Gheorghe Mureșan pictured in 2010.

Basketball is a very popular sport among Romanian youth, although its results, both past and present, are more modest than other Romanian team sports. Gheorghe Mureșan was the first Romanian to enter NBA, and he became known as the tallest man ever to play in that league. Other prominent Romanian basketballers include Mihai Albu, Dragoș Nosievici, Costel Cernat, Constantin Popa, Virgil Stănescu and Vlad Moldoveanu.

In 2016, Romania was chosen as a host for the 2017 FIBA EuroBasket. Romania will host the 2020 FIBA Under-17 Women's Basketball World Cup with Cluj-Napoca as the host city between August 15 and 23 2020.

=== Rugby union ===
Romania playing Ireland at Lansdowne Road in 2005.

Rugby union is a relatively popular team sport played in Romania, with a tradition of more than 100 years and were bronze medalists when Rugby was included in the 1924 Paris Olympic Games. The Romania national rugby union team competed at every Rugby World Cup up until 2019, where the team were disqualified for fielding ineligible players in the qualifying campaign. They returned to compete at Rugby World Cup 2023.

The Romanian CEC Bank SuperLiga is the Premier Club Rugby Competition in Romania which first commenced in 1914 and has been played almost uninterrupted since then.

== Individual sports ==
=== Fencing ===
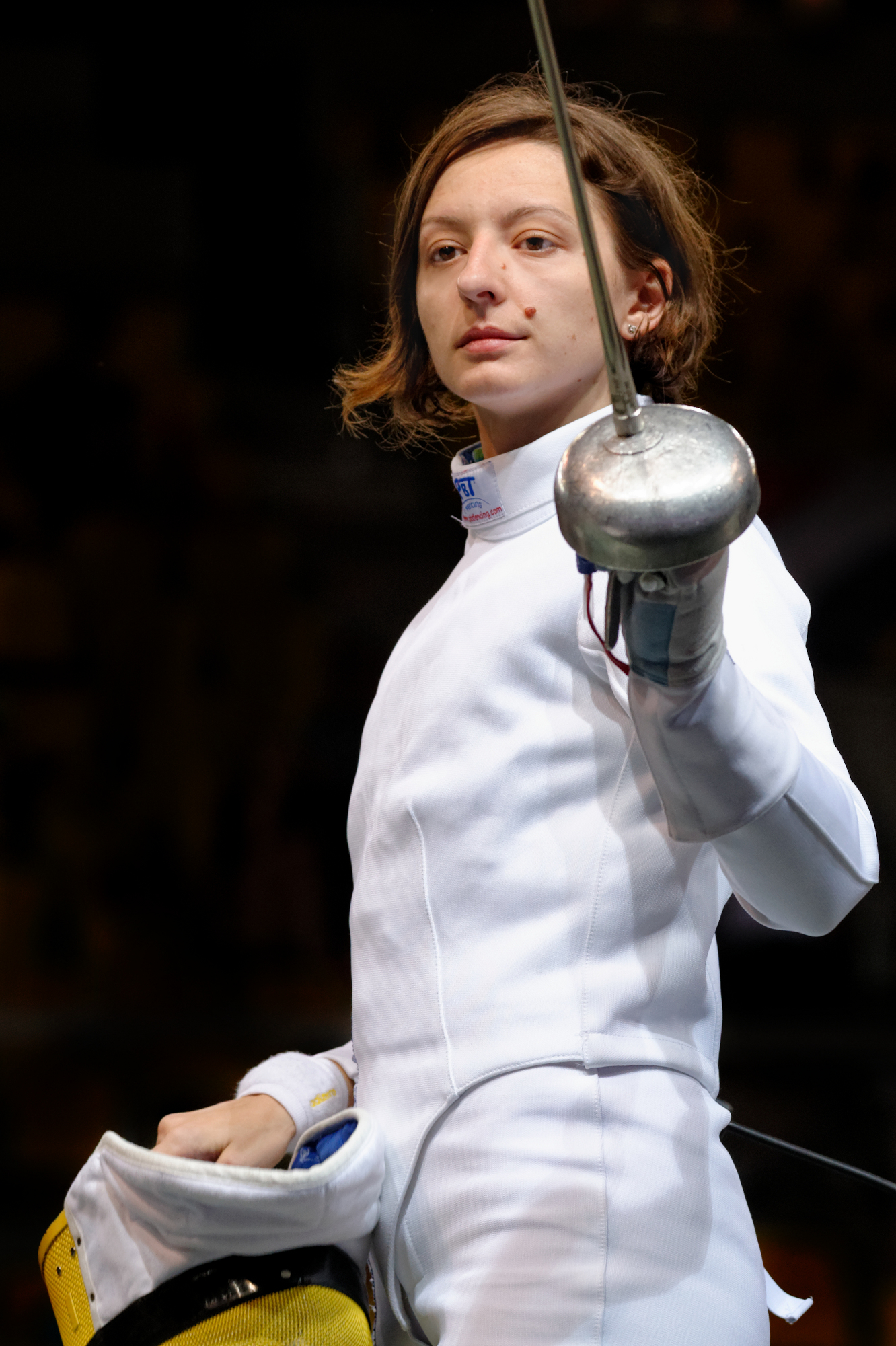
Ana Maria Popescu is currently ranked world No. 1 by the FIE.

Fencing as a sport was introduced in Romania in the 19th century by French masters. The first national fencing competition was held in 1921 and the Romanian Fencing Federation was created in 1931. The first Romanian fencer to reach the podium in a major international competition was Maria Vicol, who earned a silver medal at the 1956 Junior World Championships in Luxembourg.

Since then, fencing has brought Romania eight Olympic team medals and seven Olympic individual medals, including three golds: Ion Drîmbă (foil) at the 1968 Summer Olympics in Mexico, Laura Badea (foil) at the 1996 Summer Olympics in Atlanta, and Mihai Covaliu (sabre) at the 2000 Summer Olympics in Sydney. Romanian fencers also earned 13 gold medals in World Fencing Championships and 13 gold medals in European Fencing Championships. Six Romanians feature in the Hall of Fame of the International Fencing Federation: Laura Badea, Mihai Covaliu, Ana Pascu, Petru Kuki, Ioan Pop and Reka Szabo. Three Romanian athletes are currently amongst the ten top-ranked fencers: Ana Maria Brânză and Simona Gherman in women's épée and Tiberiu Dolniceanu in men's sabre.

=== Gymnastics ===
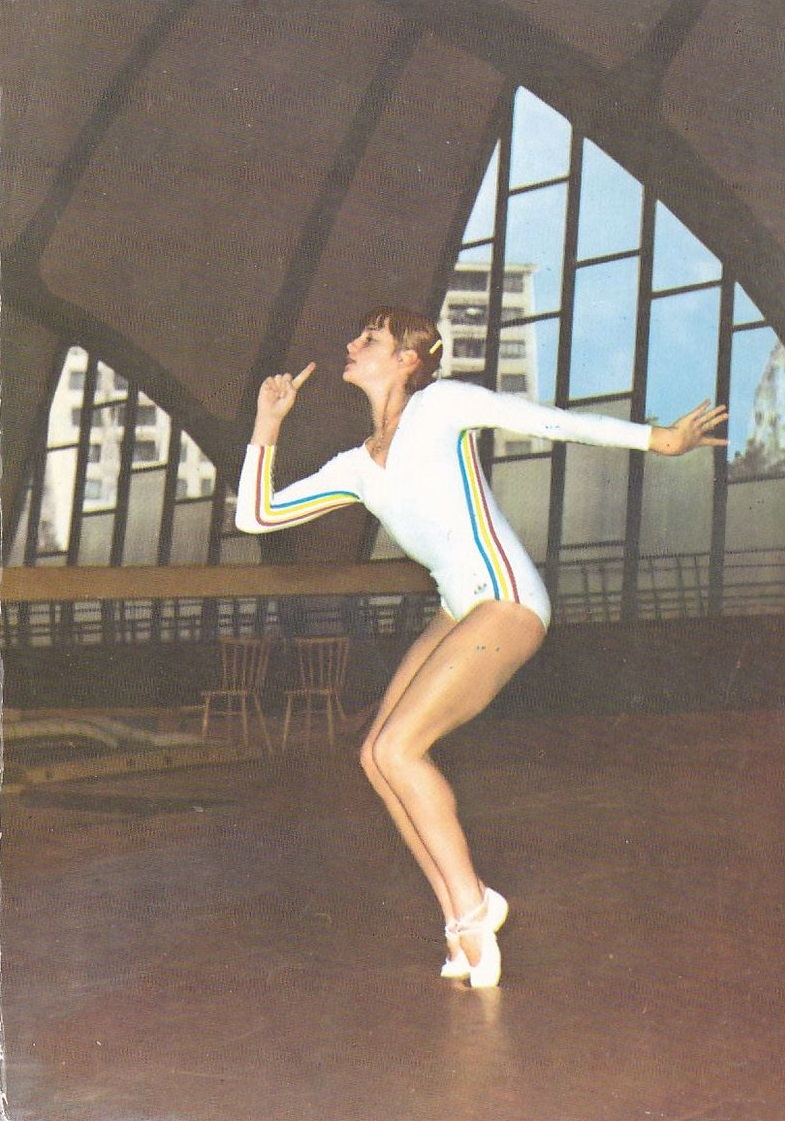
Nadia Comăneci is the only athlete to be awarded the Olympic Order twice (1984, 2004).

Romania holds a long tradition in artistic gymnastics, especially in the ladies competition. Gymnastics is responsible for the majority of Romania's Olympic medals, gold, silver, and bronze. The most famous Romanian gymnast is Nadia Comăneci, who was the first gymnast to ever score a perfect 10 at the Olympic Games, during the 1976 Summer Olympics. She also won three gold medals, one silver, and one bronze, all at the age of fourteen. Her success continued in the 1980 Summer Olympics, winning two gold medals and two silver medals. At the 1976 Olympic Games, Teodora Ungureanu did very well too, but did not receive as much fame as Nadia. Other famous gymnasts include: Daniela Silivaş, Ecaterina Szabo, Lavinia Miloşovici, Gina Gogean, Simona Amânar, Andreea Răducan, Maria Olaru, Cătălina Ponor, Sandra Izbaşa, Larisa Iordache, Ana Bărbosu, and Sabrina Voinea.

Top Romanian men's gymnasts include: Marius Urzică and Marian Drăgulescu.

Gymnastics has a very long tradition in Romania, which goes back in time decades before the major success of Montreal. Romania was also successful in the 1950s, when Elena Leușteanu won an individual Olympic medal in 1956.

=== Tennis ===
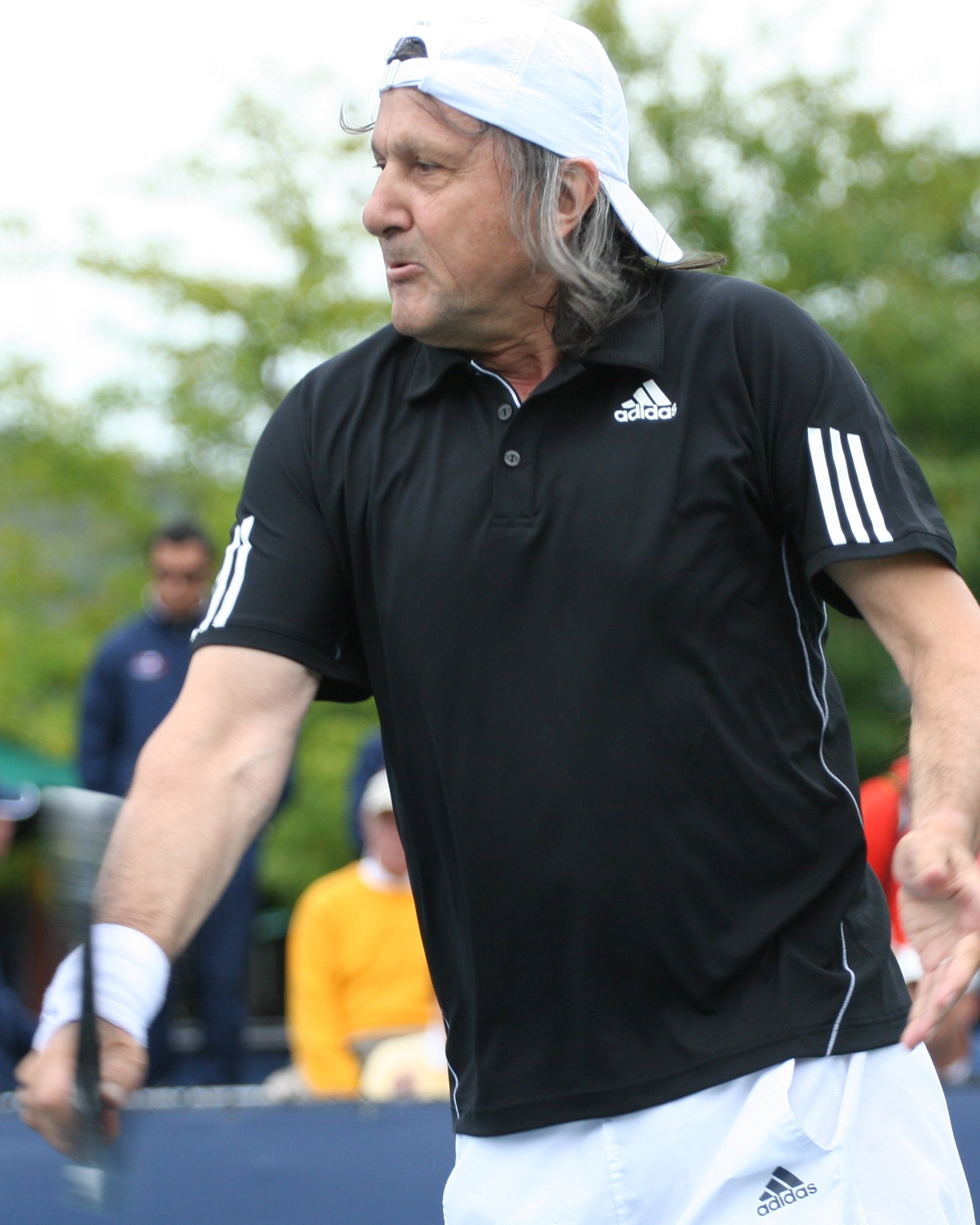
Ilie Năstase was inducted into the International Tennis Hall of Fame in 1991.

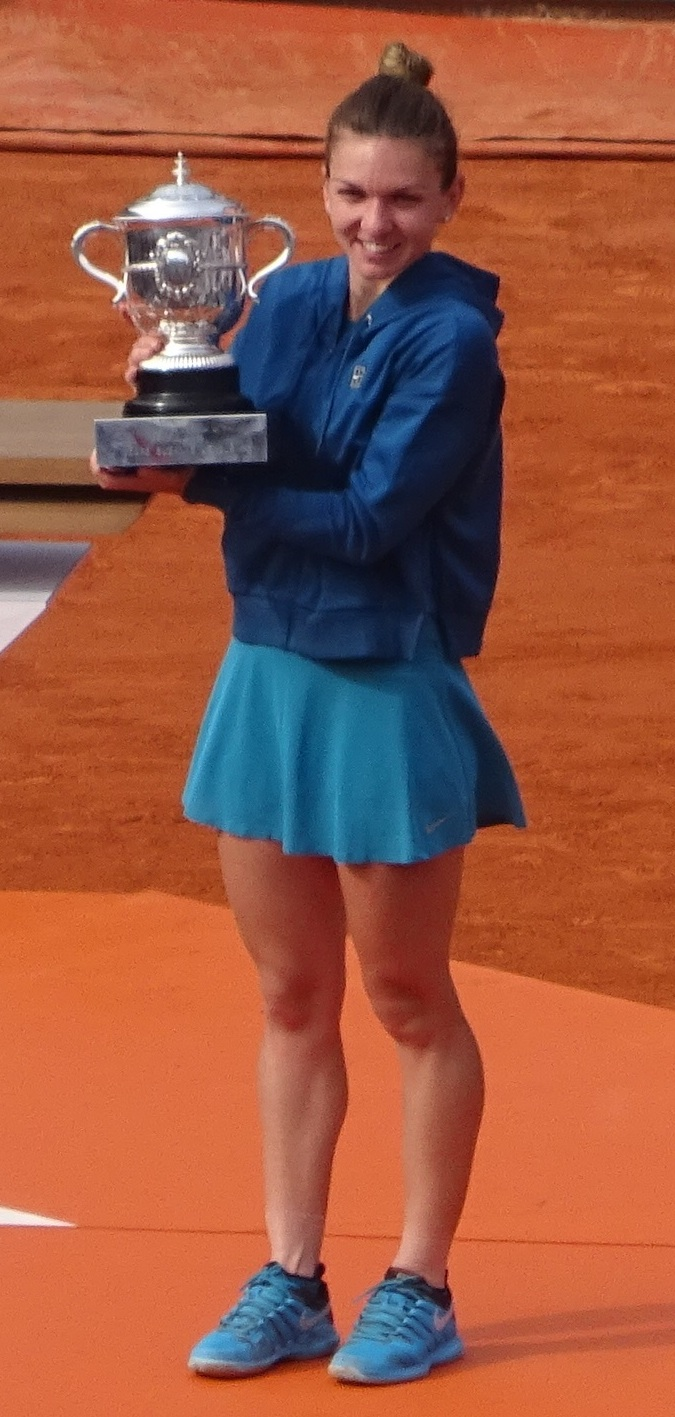
Simona Halep was the year-end No. 1 in 2017 and 2018 won two Grand Slam titles

Ilie Năstase, a famous Romanian tennis player, is another internationally known Romanian sports star. He won several Grand Slam titles and dozens of other tournaments and was the first player to be ranked as number 1 by ATP from 1973 to 1974; he also was a successful doubles player. Virginia Ruzici was a successful tennis player in the 1970s. Ilie Năstase and Simona Halep are the only Romanian tennis players to have achieved no. 1, in the ATP and WTA, respectively.

Romania reached the Davis Cup finals three times (1969, 1971, 1972). Other popular men's tennis players include Ion Țiriac and Andrei Pavel. As for active players, the top Romanians on the men's side are the doubles players, Horia Tecău and Florin Mergea, who also brought Romania's first olympic medal in tennis, a silver in 2016. In women's tennis, Magda Rurac, Virginia Ruzici, Irina Spîrlea, and Ruxandra Dragomir are among the top Romanian players of all time. Among active players, the top Romanians include Simona Halep, Sorana Cîrstea, Mihaela Buzărnescu, Irina Begu, Monica Niculescu. Simona Halep has won two Grand Slam singles titles: the 2018 French Open and the 2019 Wimbledon Championships, and was the year-end No. 1 in 2017 and 2018.

=== Oină ===
Oină is a traditional Romanian sport with similarities to baseball.

=== Boxing ===
Boxing is popular in Romania, especially in the TV broadcastings. Famous boxers include: Nicolae Linca, Francisc Vaştag, Mihai Leu, Lucian Bute, Leonard Doroftei, and Adrian Diaconu.

=== Rowing and canoeing ===
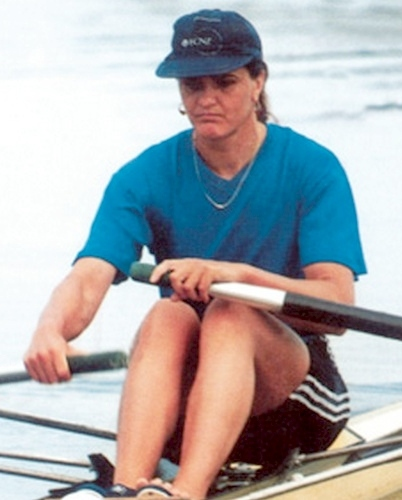
Elisabeta Lipă is the most decorated rower in the history of the Olympics.

Romanian oarspeople have brought numerous successes, including 35 Olympic medals (18 gold) for rowing and 34 medals (10 gold) for canoeing. Romania is a leading rowing nation. Often boasting many wins each year in the Junior World Rowing Championships. In the under-23's age level, Romania often field a strong team. Often medalling in the women's events.

The Romanian Senior Women's rowing team is particularly strong. They have been the poster child team as regards women's rowing. They consistently perform in the coxed women's eight. In the Olympics, they won the women's coxless pair.

=== Chess ===
Chess is fairly popular among some groups, especially retired people and mathematicians. The highest FIDE rating Romanian player is the grandmaster Liviu-Dieter Nisipeanu.

=== Motorsports ===
Transilvania Motor Ring is the first permanent circuit in Romania, and was opened in November 2018 near Târgu Mureș.

=== Other sports ===
Romania had significant success in the 20th century in athletics. Iolanda Balaș and Lia Manoliu are some of the most important names of the mid-20th century.

Table tennis is also a sport with good results in Romania. Angelica Rozeanu achieved major success in this sport in the 1950s. Elizabeta Samara is a contemporary table tennis three-time European champion.

== Olympics ==
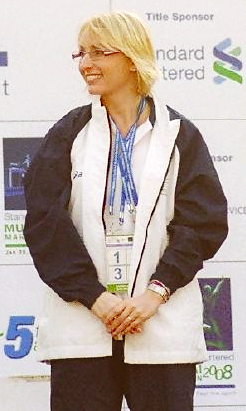
Gabriela Szabo, Olympic and World long-distance running champion and the 1999 European and World Athlete of the Year.

Maybe slightly surprising for a country of its size, Romania has been one of the most successful countries in the history of the Summer Olympic Games (15th overall) with a total of 307 medals won throughout the years, 89 of which are gold medals. Romania has appeared in 21 of the 28 Summer Olympic Games. The nation debuted at the 1900 Summer Olympics, appeared again three times between the World Wars, and has competed at every event since the 1952 Summer Olympics.

At the winter Olympics Romania won only one medal, at the 1968 Winter Olympics with two-man bobsleigh team led by Ion Panțuru and Nicolae Neagoe.
