= Hans Moser (handballer) =

German handball player and coach (born 1937)

Medal record

Men's handball

Representing Romania

World Championship
Gold medal – first place	1961 Germany	Team
Gold medal – first place	1964 Czechoslovakia	Team
Bronze medal – third place	1967 Sweden	Team

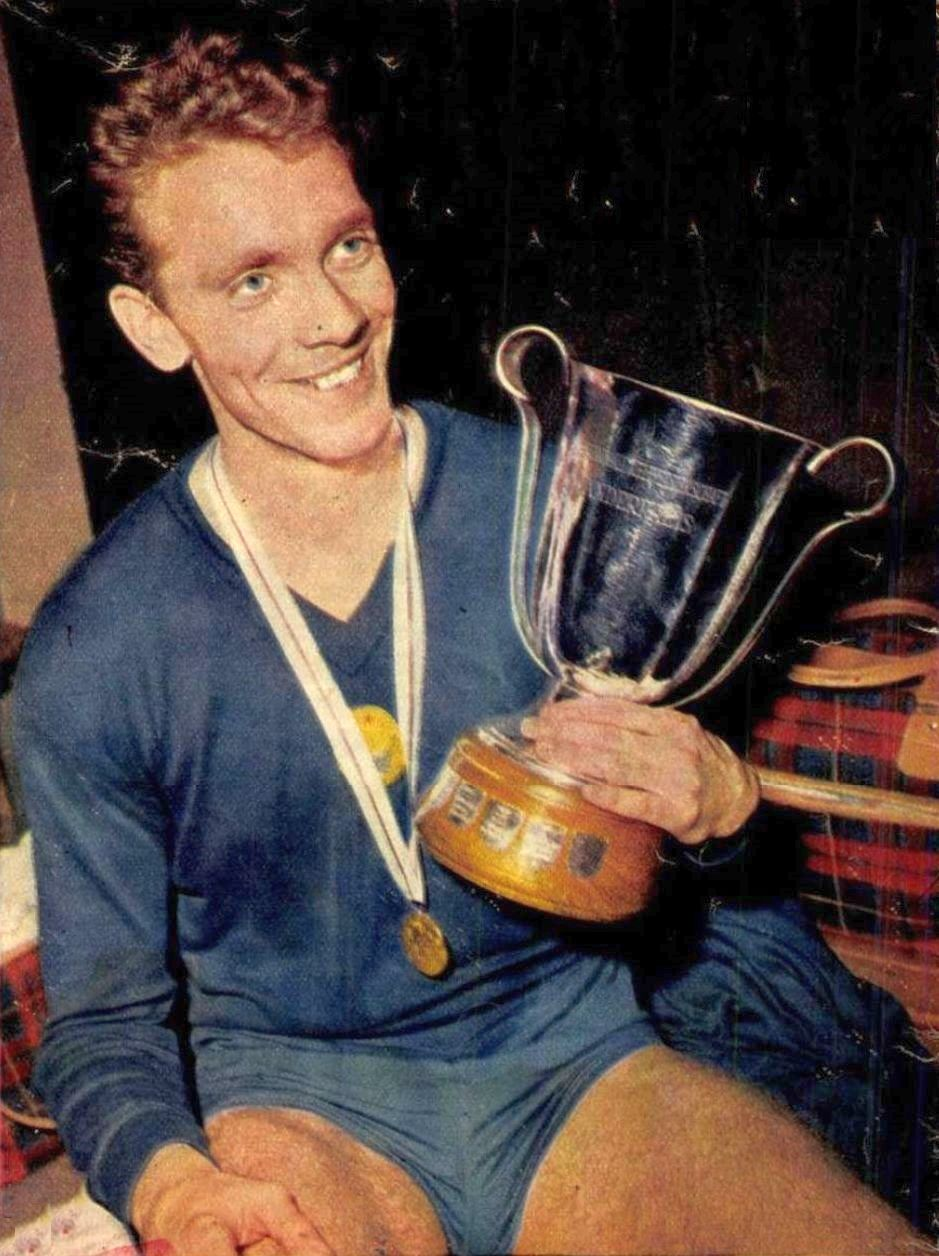
Hans Moser

Hans Moser (in Romania known sometimes as Ioan Moser; born 24 January 1937 in Timișoara, Romania) is a former Romanian-born German handball player and coach. He won two world championships as a player for the Romanian national team.

During his active player career, Moser, who is 1.92m tall, played as a center back.

In 2000, the official bulletin of the International Handball Federation, World Handball Magazine, chose Moser as a member of the "Team of the Century", together with teammates Cornel Penu and Gheorghe Gruia.

== Biography ==
Before beginning to play handball in competition, he used to play water polo and volleyball (in the latter, he was even called up for the Romanian national team's training camp).

Moser studied at a vocational high school between 1952 and 1956. In Timișoara he played for Constructorul and Știința Timișoara (winning the field handball national championship in 1956).

After studying agronomy for three years in his hometown, he studied physical education at the Sports Institute in Bucharest (1960–1965). In Bucharest he played for Dinamo Bucharest.

With Romania he participated in four World Championships:

- in 1958 in France, Moser and his teammates were eliminated the preliminary round.
- in 1961 in West Germany, he became world champion.
- in 1964 in Czechoslovakia, besides becoming again world champion, he was top scorer of the tournament. In the same year he was named "Best Handball Player in the World".
- in 1967 in Sweden, he won a bronze medal.

In 1964–1965, he won the European Cup with Dinamo Bucharest.

During the 1970 World Championship held in France, the French National Postal Service issued a stamp featuring Moser.

He played 224 games for the national team of Romania. He won eleven national championships (including three in field handball) with Dinamo Bucharest.

In 1968 he was allowed by the Romanian authorities to go to West Germany for six months as a playing coach for TV Milbertshofen. After the contract expired, he decided to defect. His wife and son, Richard, were visiting him at the time, so they decided to defect, too.

After he retired as an active player, he managed teams in Germany and Switzerland.

In 1996 he set up a series of businesses in Romania.

In 2004 he was investigated for forgery, use of forgery, and fraud. In 2008 he was sentenced by a court of law in Sighetu Marmației to one year and six months imprisonment, suspended for three and a half years.

He has been married four times, his last wife being Cuban. He has at least three children.

== Awards and distinctions ==
- 1961 Honored Master of Sports ("Maestru emerit al sportului")
- 2007 Honorary citizen of Timișoara
- 2009 Sports Merit Order, Second Class with bar
