= Cornel Oțelea =

Romanian handball player (1940–2025)

Cornel Oțelea OSR
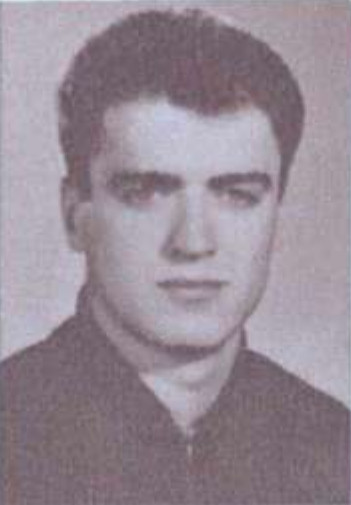
- Oțelea in 1967
- Born: 19 November 1940; Șeica Mare, Romania
- Died: 22 January 2025 (aged 84); Bucharest, Romania
- Resting place: Ghencea Cemetery
- Occupations: Professional handballer; head coach; sports administrator
- Height: 1.80 m (5 ft 11 in)
- Spouse: Rodica Oțelea
- Children: 1
- Handball career
- Height: 180 cm (71 in)
- Sport: Handball
- Position: Winger

Senior clubs
- Years: Team
- 1958–1970: Steaua București
National team
Years	Team	Apps	(Gls)
1959–1970	Romania	88	(142)
Medal record
Representing Romania
World Championships
Gold medal – first place	1961 West Germany
Gold medal – first place	1964 Czechoslovakia
Gold medal – first place	1970 France
Bronze medal – third place	1967 Sweden
Head coach Romania
World Championships
Bronze medal – third place	1990 Czechoslovakia

Cornel Oțelea (19 November 1940 – 22 January 2025) was a Romanian professional handball player and coach who won three World Championship titles with Romania. From 1993 to 1995, he served as president of the Romanian Handball Federation.

== Biography ==
Oțelea won three world titles and the European Cup with Steaua București, both as a player in 1968 and as a coach in 1977. He served as head coach of Romania's national team, leading them to a bronze medal at the 1990 World Men's Handball Championship, and later coached the Romania women's national team from 2002 to 2005. He led them at the 2003 World Women's Handball Championship, where they finished 10th and at the 2004 European Women's Handball Championship, where they finished 7th.

Colonel Cornel Oțelea from the Ministry of National Defense was promoted to the rank of brigadier general (with one star), being subsequently transferred to the reserve on 31 December 1997.

Oțelea died on 22 January 2025, at the age of 84.

== See also ==
- World Championships most winner players
