= Aurel Bulgariu =

Romanian handball player and coach (1934-1995)

Medal record

Men's Handball

Representing Romania

World Championship
Silver medal – second place	1959 Austria	Team
Gold medal – first place	1961 Germany	Team
Gold medal – first place	1964 Czekoslovakia	Team

Aurel Bulgariu (sometimes spelled Bulgaru; 13 July 1934, Sighișoara – 25 March or 16 April 1995) was a Romanian handball player who won two world championship gold medals. He was a backcourt player.

After playing for Flamura Roșie and Locomotiva Sighișoara (1951-1954), he transferred to C.C.A. Steaua, with which he won at least one national championship.

He played for the Romanian national team from 1954 until 1968. After he retired as an active player, he became a coach, managing the national teams of Egypt, Tunisia and Morocco.

He became an honorary citizen of Sighișoara.

== Honors and awards ==
- Honored Master of Sports ("Maestru emerit al sportului"),1961
- a goal-getter trophy has been named in his honor
- an international handball youth tournament is called after him
- a sports hall has been named in his honor
