= Otto Tellmann =

Romanian handball player and coach (1927–2013)

Medal record

Men's Handball

Representing Romania

World Championship
| Gold medal – first place | 1961 Germany | Team |

Otto Tellman (22 May 1927 – 10 January 2013) was a Romanian handball player and coach. He played as a pivot.

He started playing in 1945 in his hometown, Agnita, and transferred to Steaua Bucharest in 1949, where he would spend 18 years.

An 18-time national champion with Steaua, either as a player or as a coach, he was also a member of Romania's national team that won the 1961 World Men's Handball Championship in West Germany.

After retiring as a player, he became a coach, managing Voința Bucharest, Dinamo Bucharest and Steaua, teams with which he won several national championships, the Spartakiad, and twice the EHF Champions League.

In 1985, he defected to West Germany, and coached Nuremberg's women's team.

In 1986 he began coaching the men's team TV Bötzingen, where he stayed until 2002.

With Simon Schobel, Vlado Stenzel, Petre Ivănescu, and Ioan Kunst-Ghermănescu he lectured at the Internationale Freiburger Handballschule ("International Freiburg Handball School").

In 2009 Tellmann, who played 48 games for the national team, was awarded the Romanian Sport Merit Order, Second Class.
