= Luxembourg men's national handball team =

Luxembourg

Information
- Association: Luxembourg Handball Federation
- Coach: Maik Handschke

Colours
1st	2nd
- Last updated on Unknown.

The Luxembourg national handball team is the national team of Luxembourg. It takes part in international handball competitions.

The team participated at the 1958 World Men's Handball Championship, where they placed 16th.

== Competitive record ==
=== World Championships ===
World Championship record
Year	Round	Position	GP	W	D	L	GS	GA
(Nazi Germany) 1938	Did not qualify							
(Sweden) 1954	Did not qualify							
(East Germany) 1958	Preliminary round	16	3	0	0	3	20	128
(West Germany) 1961	Did not qualify							
(Czechoslovakia) 1964	Did not qualify							
(Sweden) 1967	Did not qualify							
(France) 1970	Did not qualify							
(East Germany) 1974	Did not qualify							
(Denmark) 1978	Did not qualify							
(West Germany) 1982	Did not qualify							
(Switzerland) 1986	Did not qualify							
(Czechoslovakia) 1990	Did not qualify							
(Sweden) 1993	Did not qualify							
(Iceland) 1995	Did not qualify							
(Japan) 1997	Did not qualify							
(Egypt) 1999	Did not qualify							
(France) 2001	Did not qualify							
(Portugal) 2003	Did not qualify							
(Tunisia) 2005	Did not qualify							
(Germany) 2007	Did not qualify							
(Croatia) 2009	Did not qualify							
(Sweden) 2011	Did not qualify							
(Spain) 2013	Did not qualify							
(Qatar) 2015	Did not qualify							
(France) 2017	Did not qualify							
(Denmark) / (Germany) 2019	Did not qualify							
(Egypt) 2021	Did not qualify							
(Poland) / (Sweden) 2023	Did not qualify							
(Croatia) / (Denmark) / (Norway) 2025	Did not qualify							
(Germany) 2027	Did not qualify							
(France) / (Germany) 2029	To be determined							
(Denmark) / (Iceland) / (Norway) 2031	To be determined							
Total	1/32	–	3	0	0	3	20	128

=== IHF Emerging Nations Championship ===
- 2017 – 7th place

=== EHF Challenge Trophy ===
- 2007 EHF Challenge Trophy - 2nd place

== Current roster ==
Number	Player	Club
7	Vladimir Sarac	HB Esch
20	Andy Maurschat	HB Esch
18	Alain Poeckes	HB Dudelange
16	Steve Moreira	HB Berchem
21	Chris Auger	Handball Kaerjeng
6	Antoin Biel	HB Berchem
10	Martin Muller	ASPTT Nancy
9	Joé Faber	Red Boys Differdange
8	Sascha Marzadori	HB Esch
5	Daniel Scheid	Red Boys Differdange
4	Dany Scholten	HB Esch
3	Andy Rabillier	Red Boys Differdange
11	Yann Justen	Handball Kaerjeng
2	Cedric Stein	HB Berchem
94	Yannick Bardina	HSG Kahl/Kleinostheim
