= Ivănescu =

Ivănescu is a Romanian-language surname that may refer to:

- Cezar Ivănescu (1941—2008), Romanian poet, writer and playwright
- Gheorghe Ivănescu (1912—1987), Romanian linguist and philologist
- Mircea Ivănescu (1931—2011), Romanian poet, writer and translator
- Petre Ivănescu (1936–2022), Romanian handball player and coach
- Traian Ivănescu (1933–2019), Romanian football player and coach

== See also ==
- Ivănești
