= Tellmann =

Tellmann is a surname. Notable people with the surname include:

- Otto Tellmann (1927–2013), Romanian handball player and coach
- Tom Tellmann (born 1954), American baseball player

== See also ==
- Tillmann
