= Mircea Costache II =

Romanian handball player and coach (1940–2016)

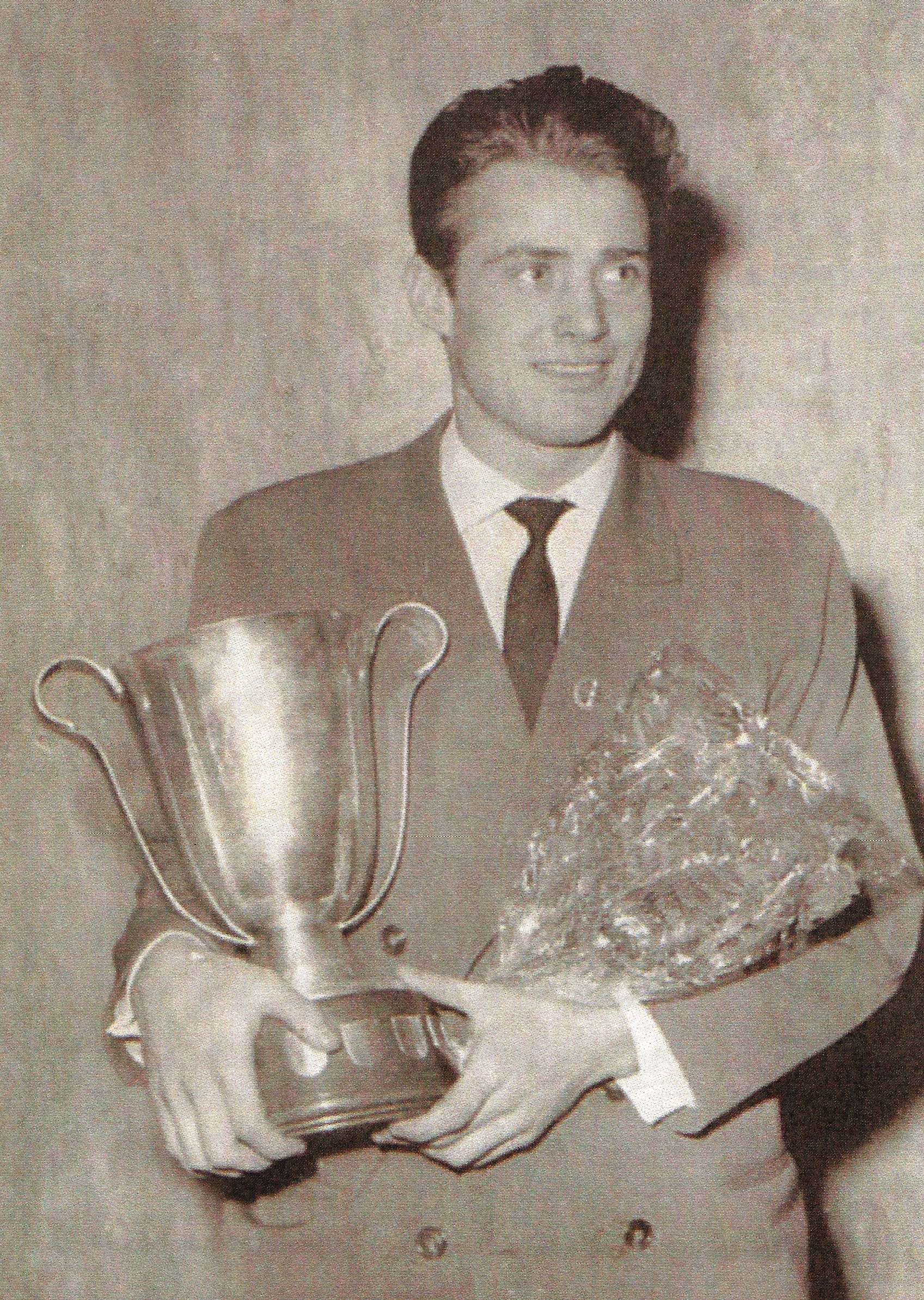
- Costache pictured in 1961

Personal information
- Full name: Mircea Costache
- Nationality: Romanian
- Born: 2 May 1940 Bucharest, Romania
- Died: 16 February 2016 (aged 75) Bucharest, Romania

Sport
- Sport: Handball
- Position: Pivot

Senior clubs
- Years: Team
- 1957–1959: Rapid București
- 1959–1971: Dinamo București
National team
Years	Team	Apps	(Gls)
1959–?	Romania	79	(99)

Teams managed
- 1971–1976: Algeria
- 1973–1975: Nadit Alger
- 1976–1980: Romania Youth
- 1980–1988: CSŞ 2 București
- 1988–1995: Portugal
- 1995–1997: Águas Santas
- 1997–1998: Vitória Setúbal
- 2000–2001: Sporting Horta
- 2003–2004: CCP Serpa
Medal record
Men's handball
Representing Romania
World Championship
Gold medal – first place	1961 West Germany	Team
Gold medal – first place	1964 Czechoslovakia	Team
Bronze medal – third place	1967 Sweden	Team
Head coach Algeria
All-Africa Games
Gold medal – first place	1973 Nigeria	Team
All-Africa University Games
Gold medal – first place	1975 Ghana	Team
African Championship
Silver medal – second place	1976 Algeria	Team
Mediterranean Games
Bronze medal – third place	1975 Alger	Team
Head coach Portugal
European Youth Championship
Gold medal – first place	1992 Switzerland	Team
IHF Junior World Championship
Bronze medal – third place	1995 Argentina	Team

Mircea Costache II (2 May 1940 – 16 February 2016) was a Romanian handball player and coach who played as a pivot for Dinamo București and for the national team. He scored the winning goal in the 1961 World Championship final.

After retiring he became a coach in his native Romania and abroad in Algeria and Portugal. Costache led the national team of Algeria to a World Cup for the first time in 1974.

Between 1988 and 1995 he was named coach of both the Portugal senior national team and the Portuguese youth sides, with whom he won the European Youth Handball Championship in 1992.

Costache was also an associate professor at the Moderna University in Lisbon from 1997 to 2002, where he coach the football team and won two championships, between 1997 and 2001, and was runner-up in 1998.

== Honours ==
=== Player ===
Dinamo Bucharest

- Romanian League: 1959, 1960, 1961, 1962, 1964, 1965, 1966
- European Cup: 1965
  - Runner-up: 1963

=== National team ===
Romania

- World Champion: 1961, 1964
  - Bronze medal: 1967

=== Coach ===
Nadit Alger

- Algerian League: 1974, 1975
- Algerian Cup: 1973

Águas Santas

- Campeonato Nacional (III Divisão): 1996

Algeria

- Winner of the gold medal at the 1973 African Games
- Winner of the gold medal at the 1975 African University Games
- Winner of the silver medal at the 1976 African Championship
- Winner of the bronze medal at the 1975 Mediterranean Games

Portugal

- Winner of the gold medal at the 1992 European Youth Championship
- Winner of the bronze medal at the 1995 IHF Junior World Championship
- Portuguese University Championship footbal 11 by Moderna University of Lisbon ( 1997-1998)
- Runner-up in footbal 11 1998-1999 with Moderna University of Lisbon
- Champions again in 1999-2000 Portuguese University Championship in footbal 11

=== Distinctions ===
- Ordinul Muncii: 1961
- Maestru Emerit al Sportului: 1961
- Medalia "Meritul Sportiv": 1964
- Medalha de Bons Serviços Desportivos (Portugal): 1993
- Medalia Serviciu Credincios: 2001
- Ordinul "Meritul sportiv" clasa II-a: 2009
- Campion de Legendă: 2009

== Selected publications ==
- Costache, Mircea (2013). Uma vida, a mesma paixão (in Portuguese). Impuls. ISBN 978-973-8132-78-8.
