= Carpathian Trophy =

Handball Tournament

The Carpathian Trophy (Romanian: 'Trofeul Carpaţi') is an annual men's and women's friendly handball tournament organised by the Romanian Handball Federation:

- men's competition
- women's competition
