= Gheorghe Gruia =

Romanian handball player (1940–2015)

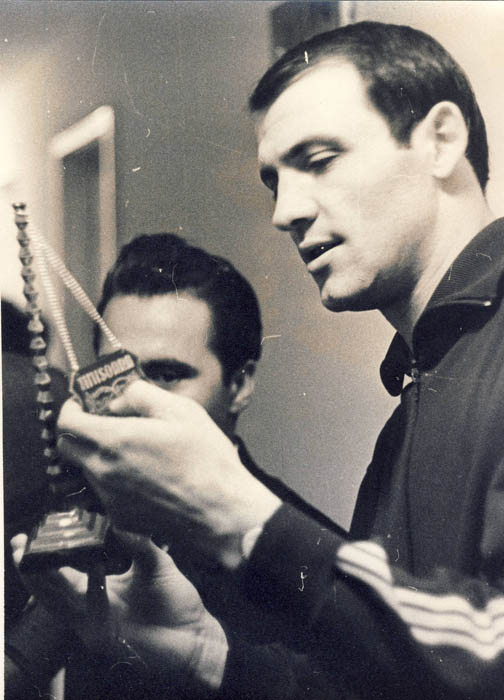
- Gruia pictured in the 1970s

Personal information
- Full name: Gheorghe Gruia Marinescu
- Born: October 2, 1940 Bucharest, Romania
- Died: December 9, 2015 (aged 75) Mexico City, Mexico
- Height: 1.92 m (6 ft 4 in)

Sport
- Sport: Handball
- Position: Right back
- Number: 10

Youth career
- Years: Team
- 1958–1961: CCA Bucharest

Senior clubs
- Years: Team
- 1961–1973: Steaua Bucharest
National team
Years	Team	Apps	(Gls)
1962–1973	Romania	126	(636)

Teams managed
- 1978–1980: Mexico
- 1981–1985: Universitario Chiapas
- 1986–1989: Pumas UNAM
- 1988–1991: Mexico
Medal record
Representing Romania
Men's handball
Olympic Games
Bronze medal – third place	1972 Germany	Team
World Championship
Gold medal – first place	1970 France	Team
Gold medal – first place	1964 Czechoslovakia	Team
Bronze medal – third place	1967 Sweden	Team
World University Championship
Gold medal – first place	1968 Germany	Team
Bronze medal – third place	1963 Sweden	Team

Gheorghe Gruia Marinescu (October 2, 1940 – December 9, 2015) was a Romanian handball player, coach, and sports official. Born in Bucharest, Gruia won two gold medals in the 1964 World Handball Championship and the 1970 World Championship. In the 1972 Summer Olympics, he won the bronze medal with Romania and became the top scorer of the competition with 37 goals. He played as a right back and spent his entire professional career with Steaua Bucharest.

The International Handball Federation named him in 1992 "The Greatest Handball Player of All Times".

Gruia resided in Mexico City, Mexico, since 1978, where he worked as a coach and an official in the sport and is credited with popularizing the sport in the country.

His daughter, Andreea, is a former Mexican telenovela actress known for her roles in Spanish language telenovelas on Televisa.

Gruia died on December 9, 2015, in Mexico City following a heart attack. Gruia is considered the 'father of handball' in Mexico.

== Gallery ==
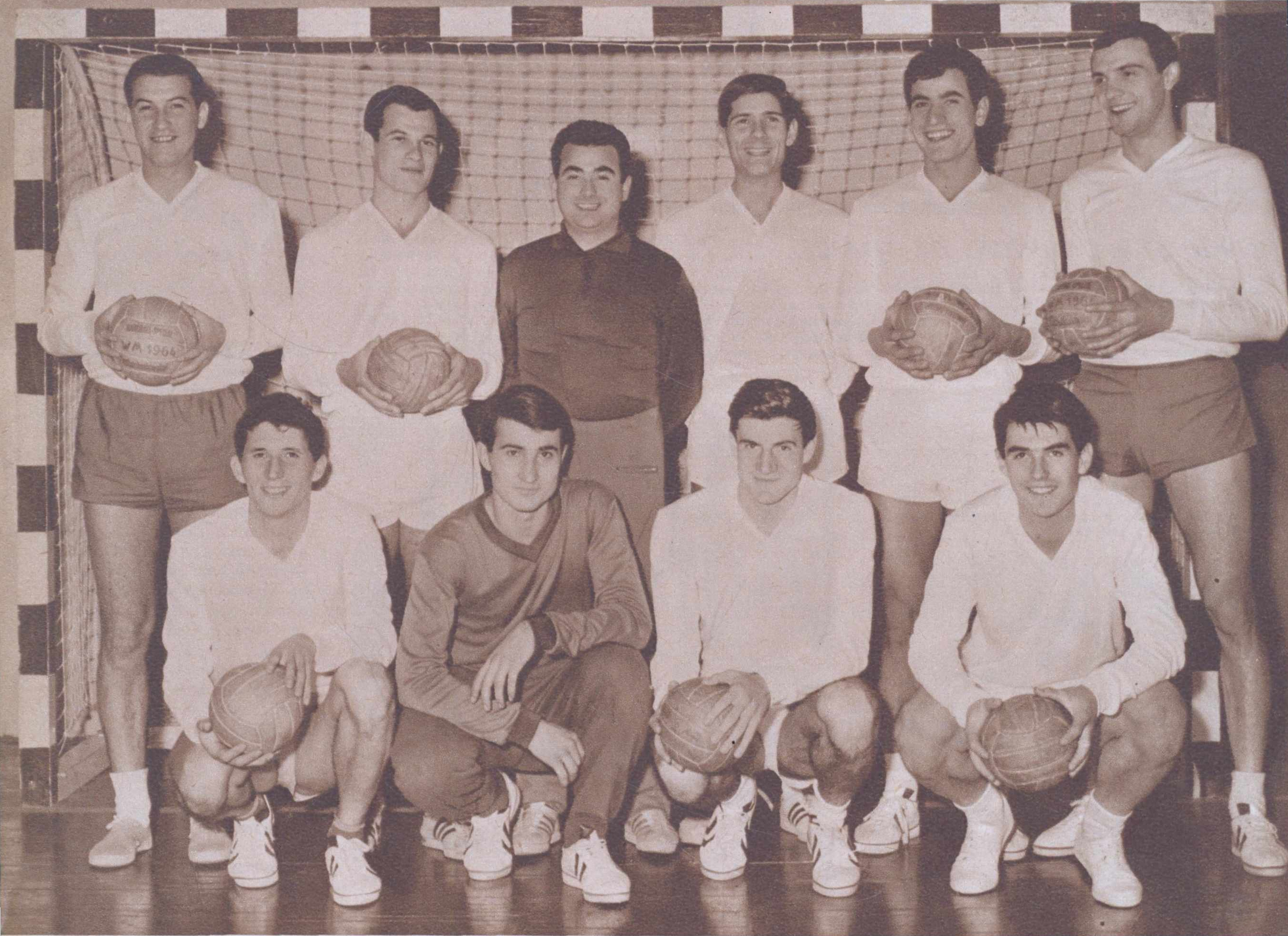
Gruia (back row, first from the right) with Romania's junior team in 1965

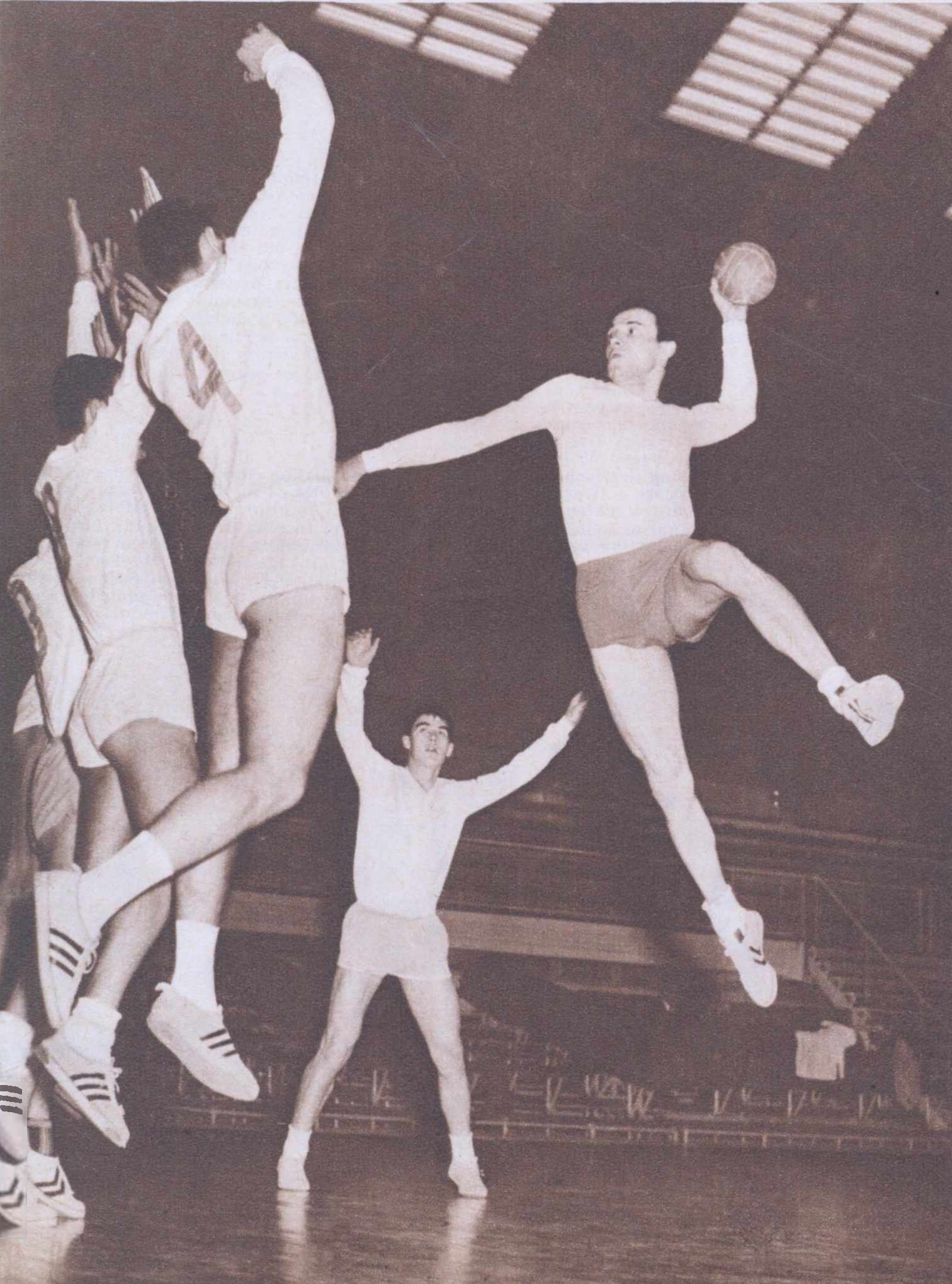
Gruia during a training session in 1965

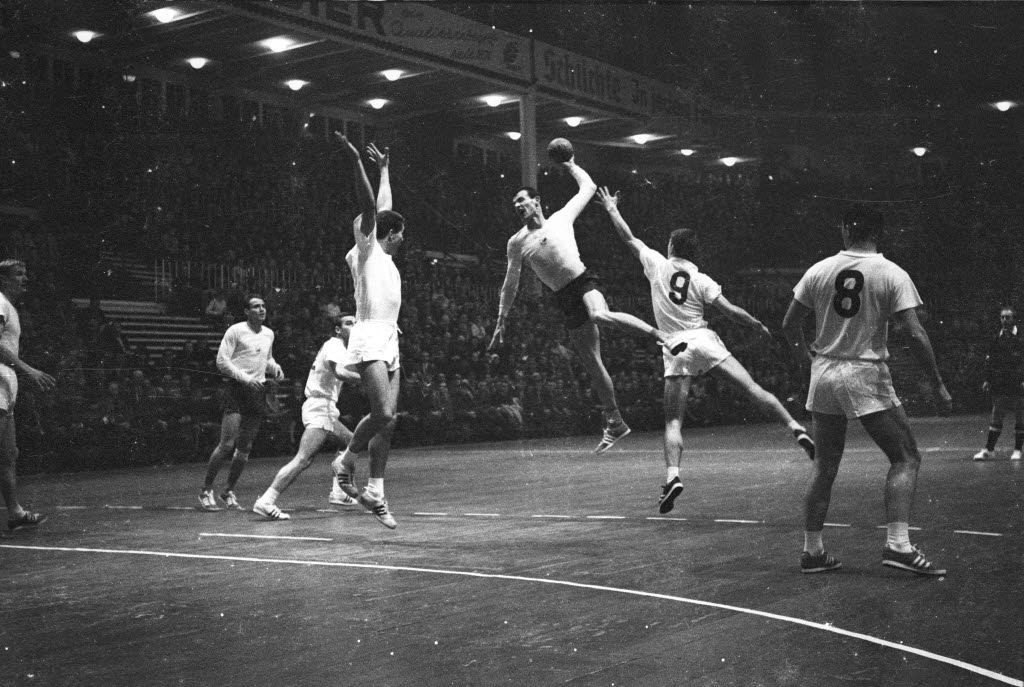
Gruia in action during a match against West Germany in 1966

Gruia (back row, second from the right) with the European Cup champions Steaua in 1968

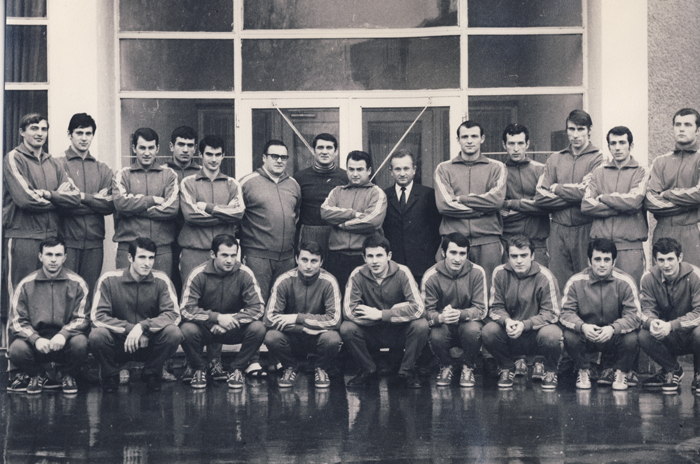
Gruia (back row, fifth from the right) with the 1970 World Championship-winning Romanian team

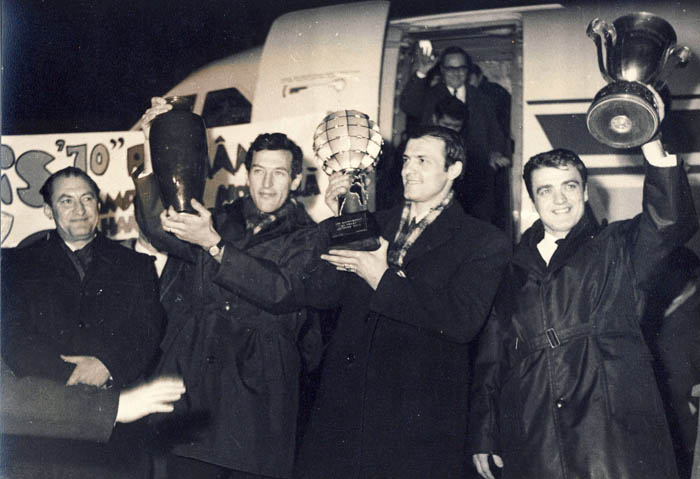
Gruia (center) in 1970

== Honours ==
=== Club ===
Steaua Bucharest

- 8× Romanian League Champion: 1963, 1967, 1968, 1969, 1970, 1971, 1972, 1973
- European Cup Champion: 1968
  - Runner-up: 1971

=== National team ===
Romania

- 2× World Champion: 1964, 1970 Gold
- World Championship: 1967 Bronze
- Summer Olympic Games: 1972 Bronze

=== Orders ===
- Ordinul "Meritul Sportiv": 2009.
