= 1961 World Men's Handball Championship =

Tournament details
- Host country: West Germany
- Dates: 1–12 March 1961
- Teams: 12

Final positions
- Champions: Romania
- Runners-up: Czechoslovakia
- Third place: Sweden

Tournament statistics
- Matches played: 28
- Goals scored: 811 (28.96 per match)
- Top scorer(s): (Romania) Petre Ivănescu (Czechoslovakia) Zdeněk Rada (24 goals each)

The 1961 World Men's Handball Championship was the fourth team handball World Championship. It was held in West Germany and West Berlin between 1–12 March 1961. A united team composed of players from the German Democratic Republic and the Federal Republic of Germany competed. Romania won the championship.

== Results ==
=== Preliminary round ===
GROUP A

Date	Venye	Match	Res.	Half
1 Mar	Stuttgart	Sweden - Norway	15-11	(11-5)
2 Mar	Bietigheim	Norway - Yugoslavia	18-17	(9-9)
3 Mar	Ulm	Sweden - Yugoslavia	14-12	(9-8)

Group A	Matches	Goals	Points
Sweden	2	29-23	4
Norway	2	29-32	2
Yugoslavia	2	29-32	0

GROUP B

Date	Venue	Match	Res.	Half
1 mar	West Berlin	Germany - Netherlands	33-7	(11-3)
2 mar	Wolfsburg	France - Netherlands	21-11	(7-5)
3 mar	Kiel	Germany - France	21-7	(9-2)

Group B	Matches	Goals	Points
Germany	2	54-14	4
France	2	28-32	2
Netherlands	2	18-54	0

GROUP C

Date	Venue	Match	Res.	Half
1 mar	Karlsruhe	Czechoslovakia - Japan	38-10	(15-5)
2 mar	Hassloch	Romania - Japan	29-11	(14-7)
3 mar	Freiburg	Czechoslovakia - Romania	12-8	(3-3)

Group C	Matches	Goals	Points
Czechoslovakia	2	50-18	4
Romania	2	37-23	2
Japan	2	21-67	0

GROUP D

Date	Venue	Match	Res.	Half
1 Mar	Karlsruhe	Denmark - Iceland	24-13	(9-6)
2 Mar	Wiesbaden	Iceland - Switzerland	14-12	(7-7)
3 Mar	St. Ingbert	Denmark - Switzerland	18-13	(12-5)

Group D	Matches	Goals	Points
Denmark	2	42-26	4
Iceland	2	27-36	2
Switzerland	2	25-32	0

=== Main Round ===
GROUP 1

Date	Venue	Match	Res.	Half
5 Mar	Stuttgart	Sweden - France	15 - 11	(7-6)
5 Mar	Stuttgart	Czechoslovakia - Iceland	15 - 15	(10-7)
7 Mar	Essen	Sweden - Iceland	18 - 10	(7-3)
7 Mar	Essen	Czechoslovakia - France	25 - 6	(11-3)
9 Mar	West Berlin	Czechoslovakia - Sweden	15- 10	(10-5)
9 Mar	Homberg	Iceland - France	20 - 13	(11-3)

Group 1	Matches	Goals	Points
Czechoslovakia	3	55-31	5
Sweden	3	43-36	4
Iceland	3	45-46	3
France	3	30-60	0

GROUP 2

Date	Venue	Match	Res.	Half
5 mar	Dortmund	Germany - Norway	15- 8	(10-4)
5 mar	Dortmund	Romania - Denmark	15 -13	(6-7)
7 mar	Krefeld	Romania - Germany	12 - 9	(7-5)
7 mar	Krefeld	Denmark - Norway	10 - 9	(6-7)
9 mar	Münster	Germany - Denmark	15 - 13	(6-4)
9 mar	Münster	Romania - Norway	16 - 14	(9-6)

Group 2	Matches	Goals	Points
Romania	3	43-36	6
Germany	3	39-33	4
Denmark	3	36-39	2
Norway	3	31-41	0

=== Final matches ===
Date	Venue	Match	Score
Match for 7th place
12 March	Dortmund	France - Norway	12-13* (7-7, 10-10)
Match for 5th place
11 March	Dortmund	Iceland - Denmark	13-14 (8-7)
Bronze medal match
11 March	Dortmund	Sweden - Germany	17-14 (8-9)
Final
12 March	Dortmund	Czechoslovakia - Romania	8-9** (4-4, 7-7, 7-7)
*after 1 extra-time ; **after 2 extra-times

== Final standings ==
Rank	Team
Gold medal	Romania
Silver medal	Czechoslovakia
Bronze medal	Sweden
4	Germany
5	Denmark
6	Iceland
7	Norway
8	France
9	Yugoslavia
10	Switzerland
11	Netherlands
12	Japan

== Medallists ==
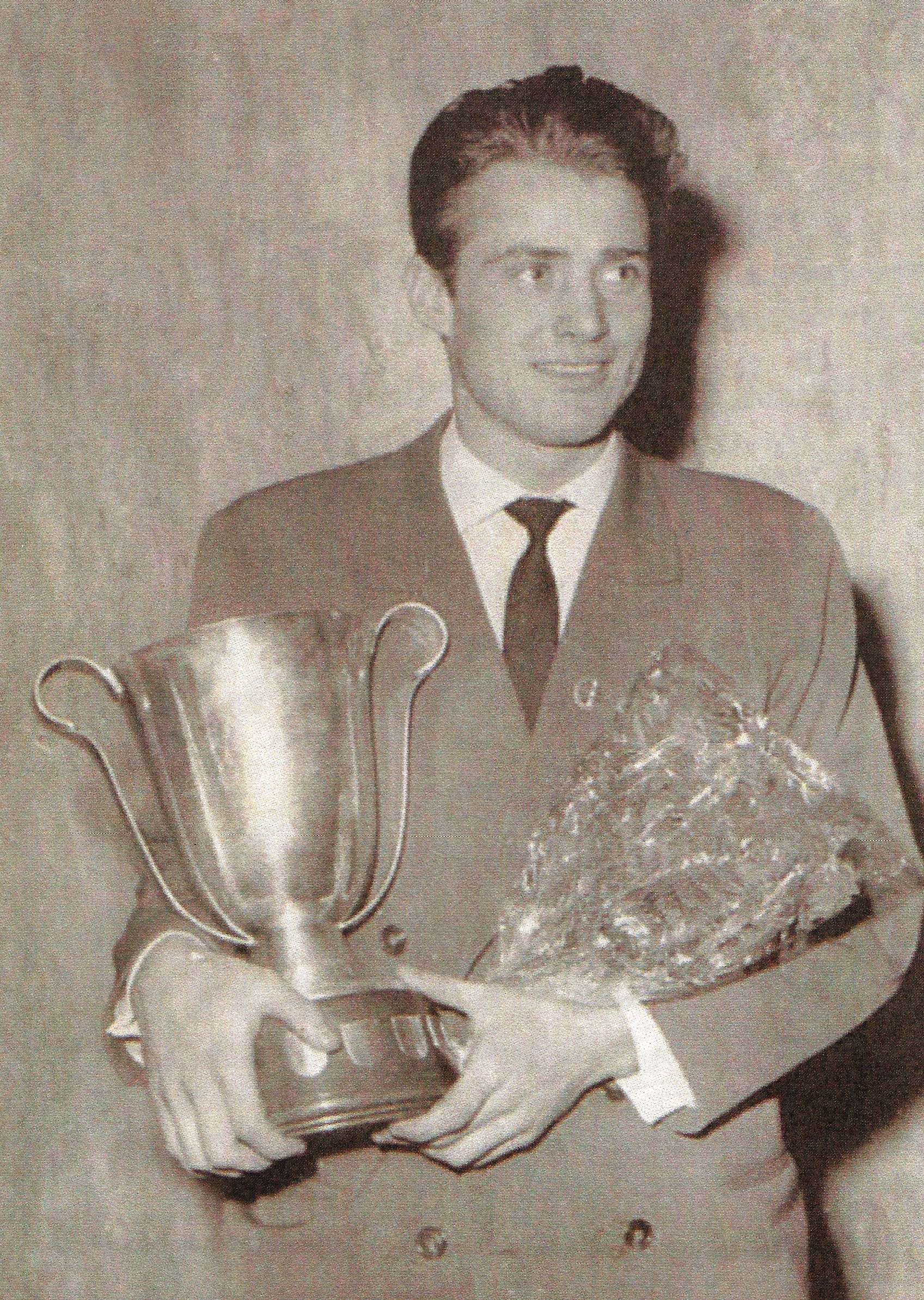
Mircea Costache II with the cup.

Gold	Silver	Bronze
Romania	Czechoslovakia	Sweden
Ioan Bogolea; Michael Redl; George Bădulescu; Aurel Bulgaru; Gheorghe Coman; Mircea Costache I Mircea Costache II; George Covaciu; Virgil Hnat; Petre Ivănescu; Hans Moser; Olimpiu Nodea; Cornel Oţelea; Otto Tellman	František Arnošt; Karel Čermák; Václav Duda; Antonín Frolo; Rudolf Havlík; František Herman; Karol Lukošík; Vojtěch Mareš; Oskar Poliak; Jaroslav Provazník; Zdeněk Rada; Dušan Ruža; Jaroslav Skála; František Šobora; Josef Trojan; Jiří Vícha	Rolf Almqvist; Gunnar Brusberg; Hans Collin; Uno Danielsson; Bengt J. Johansson; Kjell Jönsson; Hans Karlsson; Gunnar Kämpendahl; Lennart Kärrström; Donald Lindblom; Hans Olsson; Karl-Oskar Olsson; Stig-Lennart Olsson; Åke Reimer; Lennart Ring; Rune Åhrling
