= Cristian Zaharia =

Romanian handball player (born 1967)

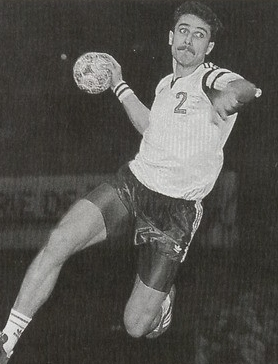
- Cristian Zaharia 1991

Personal information
- Full name: Cristian Valentin Zaharia
- Born: 8 July 1967 (age 59) Bucharest, Romania
- Height: 1.93 m (6 ft 4 in)

Sport
- Sport: Handball
- Position: Left back

Senior clubs
- Years: Team
- 1984–1990: (Romania) Dinamo Bucharest
- 1990–1993: (Sweden) HK Drott
- 1993–1996: (France) Pontault-Combault
- 1996–1997: (Germany) HSG Düsseldorf
- 1997–1998: (France) Boulogne-Billancourt
National team
| Years | Team | Apps | (Gls) |
| 1988–1995 | Romania | 152 | (620) |

Teams managed
- 2001–2003: United States
- 2003–2009: (United States) Miami Sharks
Medal record
Men's handball
Representing Romania
World Championship
| Bronze medal – third place | 1990 Czechoslovakia | Team |
Head Coach of United States
Pan American Games
| Bronze medal – third place | 2003 Dominican Republic | Team |

Cristian Valentin Zaharia (born 8 July 1967) is a Romanian former professional handball player and current coach. He competed in the men's tournament at the 1992 Summer Olympics.

== Honours ==
=== Team ===
Dinamo Bucharest

- Romanian League: 1986
- Romanian Cup: 1988

HK Drott

- Swedish League: 1991

Pontault-Combault

- French Second Division: 1994
