= Romanian Handball Federation =

- Formation: 1936
- Type: Sports federation
- Headquarters: Bucharest, Romania
- Official language: Romanian
- President: Constantin Din
- Website: frh.ro

The Romanian Handball Federation (Romanian: Federaţia Română de Handbal) (FRH) is the governing body of handball in Romania. It is based in Bucharest. FRH is led by 6 departments.

== History ==
- The official rules of the game are written and published by Karl Schelenz in Berlin (1919).
- On 17 June 1921, the first game of handball takes place in Romania. The game was played at the Central Stadium Sibiu. It was organized by professor Wilhelm Binder, and the teams were two local high schools: Brukenthal High School and Girls High School.
- In 1931, Sibiu will organize the first major competition: Transylvania Cup.
- In 1933, handball is added to the existing Romanian Volleyball and Basketball Federation becoming Romanian Volleyball, Basketball and Handball Federation (FRVBH).
- In 1934, Transylvania Cup becomes Handball National League. The league is formed from three sub-divisions based on their location: North League (Ardeal), West League (Banat) and South League (Bucharest and Ploieşti).
- In 1936, Romanian Handball Federation is founded as an independent governing body.

== Competitions ==
The Romanian Handball Federation organizes the following handball leagues:

- Romanian First League of Men's Handball
- Romanian First League of Women's Handball
- Division A Men's Handball
- Division A Women's Handball
- Juniors League I Men's Handball
- Juniors League I Women's Handball
- Juniors League II Men's Handball
- Juniors League II Women's Handball
- Juniors League III Men's Handball
- Juniors League III Women's Handball

It also organizes the Romania men's national handball team and the Romania women's national handball team and also Carpathian Trophy.

== Presidents ==
| Name | Tenure |
|---|---|
| Nicolae Duţescu | 1933–1936 |
| Ion Drăgan | 1936–1940 |
| Maxim Ganţu | 1940–1949 |
| Adrian Sabatini | 1950–1952 |
| Petre Capră | 1952–1957 |
| Tudor Vasile | 1957–1968 |
| Dumitru Costea | 1968–1973 |
| Ioan Kunst-Ghermănescu | 1973–1986 |
| Ani Matei | 1986–1989 |
| Ioan Kunst-Ghermănescu | 1990–1992 |
| Adrian Pascal | 1992–1993 |
| Cornel Oțelea | 1993–1995 |
| Valentin Samungi | 1995–1996 |
| Cristian Gațu | 1996–2014 |
| Alexandru Dedu | 2014–2022 |
| Constantin Din | 2022- |
