= Czechoslovakia men's national handball team =

The Czechoslovakia national handball team was the national handball team of Czechoslovakia.

- Czechoslovakia hosted the fifth team handball World Championship, the 1964 World Men's Handball Championship. Host cities were Prague, Bratislava, Gottwaldov and Pardubice.
- The 1990 World Men's Handball Championship was the 12th team handball World Championship. It was held in Czechoslovakia from February 28 to March 10, 1990.

Their last tournament was the 1993 World Men's Handball Championship, which happened after the dissolution of Czechoslovakia, but the handball federation had not split up yet.

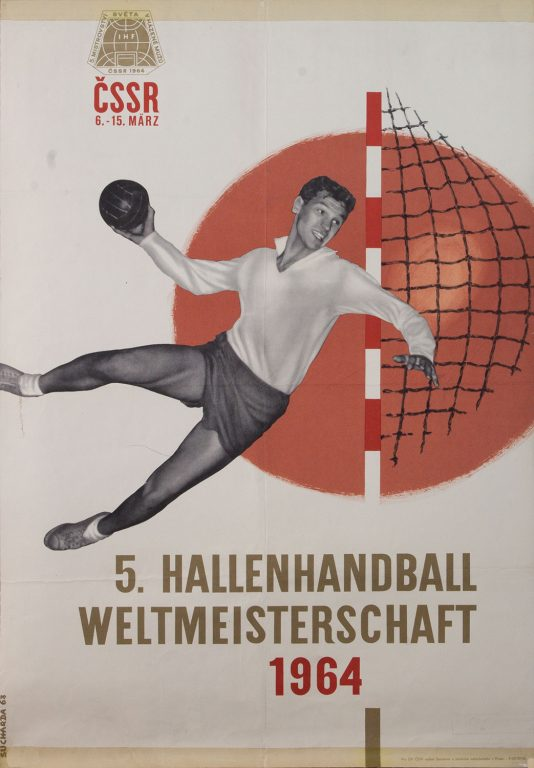

== Olympic Games history ==
- 1972 : 2nd place
- 1976 : 7th place
- 1988 : 6th place
- 1992 : 9th place

== World Championship history ==
- 1954 : 3rd place
- 1958 : 2nd place
- 1961 : 2nd place
- 1964 : 3rd place
- 1967 : 1st place
- 1970 : 7th place
- 1974 : 6th place
- 1978 : 11th place
- 1982 : 10th place
- 1986 : 13th place
- 1990 : 7th place
- 1993 : 7th place

=== Euro Tournaments ===
All teams in these tournaments are European,all World and Olympic Champions, and top 7 from World Championships and Olympics were participating. They were mini European championships at the time.

EURO World Cup tournament Sweden

- 1971 (Sweden) : 4th place
- 1974 (Sweden) : 6th place
- 1992 (Sweden) : 6th place

EURO Super Cup tournament Germany

- 1979 (Germany) : 5th place
- 1981 (Germany) : 4th place
- 1983 (Germany) : 4th place
- 1985 (Germany) : 6th place
- 1987 (Germany) : 7th place
- 1989 (Germany) : 7th place
