= 1958 World Men's Handball Championship =

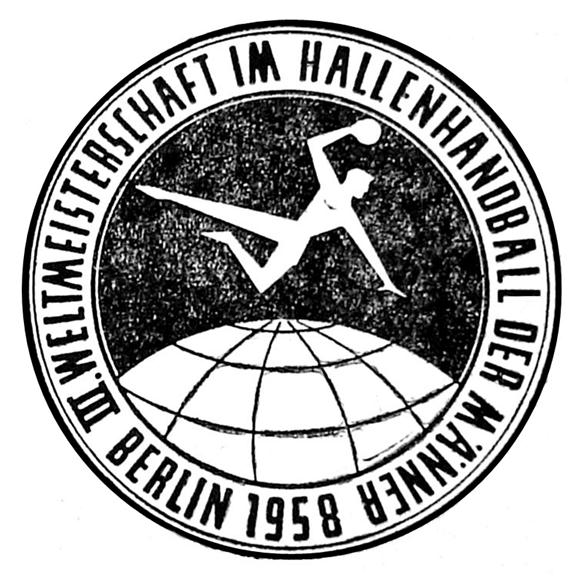

Tournament details
- Host country: German Democratic Republic
- Dates: 27 February and 8 March
- Teams: 16

Final positions
- Champions: Sweden (2nd title)
- Runners-up: Czechoslovakia
- Third place: Germany

Tournament statistics
- Matches played: 36
- Goals scored: 1,296 (36 per match)
- Top scorer(s): (Denmark) Mogens Olsen 46

The 1958 World Men's Handball Championship was the third indoor handball World Championship. It was held in the German Democratic Republic between 27 February and 8 March 1958. Germany sent a united team composed of players from the GDR and the FRG. Sweden won the championship.

== Qualification ==
Competition	Dates	Vacancies	Qualified
Host nation		1	Germany
First 15 teams		15	Austria; Brazil; Czechoslovakia; Denmark; Finland; France; Hungary; Iceland; Luxembourg; Norway; Poland; Romania; Spain; Sweden; Yugoslavia

There was no qualification for this edition. Besides Germany which was already qualified as host, the first 15 teams got a spot. Belgium made the last respectively sixteenth application and was therefore denied. They were reservist if an other country would have cancelled.

Switzerland was the only participant of the last world championship (1954) which didn't apply. At the meeting of the Schweizerischer Handballausschuss (HBA) on 27./28. July 1957 the council decided unanimous to boycott the world championship. The reasons for the boycott were that the players behind the Iron Curtain were state amateurs and the politic believe against the host East Germany. Peter Weninger of the "Deutsche Handballwoche" understood the political aspect but sad also that at a world championship every body shut attend. The past boss of the referee commission of the HBA Paul Tanner made a letter to the editor at the newspaper Sport which he criticized the decision. After a verbal fight with the HBA president Albert Wagner, Paul Tanner resigned as referee.

== Results ==
=== Preliminary round ===
Group A Venue: Erfurt

Date	Matches	Score	Half
27 February	Sweden – Spain	31–11	(15-5)
27 February	Poland – Finland	14–14	(6-8)
1 March	Spain – Finland	19–16	(12-6)
1 March	Sweden – Poland	19–14	(11-5)
3 March	Poland – Spain	25–11	(12-3)
3 March	Sweden – Finland	27–16	(14-6)

Group A	Matches	Goals	Points
Sweden	3	77–41	6
Poland	3	53–44	3
Spain	3	41–72	2
Finland	3	46–60	1

Group B Venue: East Berlin

Date	Matches	Score	Half
28 February	Germany – Luxembourg	46–4	(23-1)
28 February	Norway – France	17–13	(8-7)
2 March	Norway – Luxembourg	41–8	(25-3)
2 March	Germany – France	32–12	(16-8)
4 March	France – Luxembourg	41–8	(19-0)
4 March	Germany – Norway	19–9	(11-4)

Group B	Matches	Goals	Points
Germany	3	97–25	6
Norway	3	67–40	4
France	3	66–57	2
Luxembourg	3	20–128	0

Group C Venue: Magdeburg

Date	Matches	Score	Half
27 February	Czechoslovakia – Iceland	27–17	(15-9)
27 February	Hungary – Romania	16–16	(8-8)
1 March	Iceland – Romania	13–11	(7-6)
1 March	Czechoslovakia – Hungary	26–11	(12-3)
3 March	Hungary – Iceland	19–16	(11-7)
3 March	Czechoslovakia – Romania	21–13	(9-9)

Group C	Matches	Goals	Points
Czechoslovakia	3	74–41	6
Hungary	3	46–58	3
Iceland	3	46–57	2
Romania	3	40–50	1

Group D Venue: Erfurt

Date	Matches	Score	Half
28 February	Denmark – Brazil	32–12	(14-6)
28 February	Yugoslavia – Austria	35–8	(16-2)
2 March	Austria – Brazil	24–12	(9-5)
2 March	Denmark – Yugoslavia	20–12	(8-8)
4 March	Yugoslavia – Brazil	22–9	(11-2)
4 March	Denmark – Austria	22–18	(13-10)

Group D	Matches	Goals	Points
Denmark	3	74–42	6
Yugoslavia	3	69–37	4
Austria	3	50–69	2
Brazil	3	33–78	0

== Main round ==
Group 1........Venue: East Berlin

Date	Matches	Score	Half
5 March	Germany – Hungary	22–15	(14-8)
5 March	Czechoslovakia – Norway	21–10	(10-3)
6 March	Norway – Hungary	23–21	(13-12)
6 March	Czechoslovakia – Germany	17–14	(10-6)

Group 1	Matches	Goals	Points
Czechoslovakia	3	64–35	6
Germany	3	55–42	4
Norway	3	42–61	2
Hungary	3	47–71	0

Group 2.......Venue: Leipzig

Date	Matches	Score	Half
5 March	Denmark – Poland	22–15	(8-6)
5 March	Sweden – Yugoslavia	26–9	(14-5)
6 March	Poland – Yugoslavia	9–7	(4-6)
6 March	Sweden – Denmark	13–12	(8-5)

Group 2	Matches	Goals	Points
Sweden	3	58–35	6
Denmark	3	54–40	4
Poland	3	38–48	2
Yugoslavia	3	28–55	0

== Final round ==
Final matches .........Venue: East Berlin

Date	Matches	Score	Half
Match for 7th place
7 March	Hungary – Yugoslavia	24–16	(10-9)
Match for 5th place
7 March	Norway – Poland	18–20	(8-11)
Bronze medal match
8 March	Germany – Denmark	16–13	(10-6)
Final
8 March	Czechoslovakia – Sweden	12–22	(5-10)

== Final standings ==
Rank	Team
Gold medal	Sweden
Silver medal	Czechoslovakia
Bronze medal	Germany
4	Denmark
5	Poland
6	Norway
7	Hungary
8	Yugoslavia
9	France
10	Iceland
11	Austria
12	Spain
13	Romania
14	Finland
15	Brazil
16	Luxembourg
