= Vojtěch Mareš =

Czech handball player and coach (1936–2025)

Mareš taking a shot at goal

Vojtěch Mareš (14 August 1936 – 16 July 2025) was a Czech handball player and coach. He was the gold medalist at the 1967 World Handball Championship in Sweden in 1967, playing for Czechoslovakia as a winger. Originally he was a physical education teacher. In 1968, he also played in the World Selection.

== Life and career ==
Mareš was born in Považská Bystrica on 14 August 1936. He started playing handball in Vsetín, after moving to Prague he started playing for Slavia Prague. During his university studies he played for the men's team Sparta Prague (until 1959). He then enlisted in the army and transferred to the Dukla Prague, where he remained until the end of his playing career (1959–1971). During this time, the team won several league titles. From 1977 to 1982, he worked for five years in Kuwait. He then worked abroad again from 1989 to 1994, when he coached the men's and women's national teams in the United States.

Mareš played more than 100 matches for the national team. In 1986–1989, he coached the men's national team of Czechoslovakia, with which they participated in the 1988 Summer Olympics in Seoul, where they finished in sixth place. In 1997–2001, he coached the Czech Republic women's national handball team. From 2002, he was the coach of the Slovakia women's national handball team.

Mareš died on 16 July 2025, at the age of 88.
