= Alexandru Dedu =

Romanian handball player (born 1971)

Personal information
- Full name: Alexandru Mihai Dedu
- Nationality: (Romania) Romanian
- Born: 15 September 1971 (age 55) Ploiești, Romania

Sport
- Sport: Handball
- Position: Pivot

Youth career
- Years: Team
- –: CSS Ploiești

Senior clubs
- Years: Team
- 1989–1991: Poli Timişoara
- 1991–1996: Steaua București
- 1996: Istres Sports
- 1996–1999: Barcelona
- 1999–2000: Wuppertal
- 2000–2004: Porto
- 2005: Pontevedra
National team
Years	Team	Apps	(Gls)
1991-?	Romania	232	(399)

Alexandru Mihai Dedu (born 15 September 1971 in Ploiești) is a retired Romanian handballer and handball administrator who played for the Romanian national team in line player position. From 2014 to 2022 he was the president of the Romanian Handball Federation.

He was part of the Romanian team which ranked eight at the 1992 Summer Olympic Games in Barcelona.

On 10 February 2014, Dedu has been elected President of the Romanian Handball Federation (FRH) for a four-year tenure, replacing Cristian Gațu (1996–2014). He left this position in 2022. In 2026 he once again ran for the presidency of the Romanian Handball Federation.

== Honours ==
Poli Timişoara

- Romanian Liga Națională: 1990–91

Steaua București

- Romanian Liga Națională: 1993–94, 1995–96

Barcelona

- Liga ASOBAL: 1996–97, 1997–98, 1998–99
- Copa del Rey: 1996–97, 1997–98
- Supercopa ASOBAL: 1996–97, 1997–98
- EHF Champions League: 1996–97, 1997–98, 1998–99
- EHF Super Cup: 1997–98, 1998–99

Porto

- Portuguese League: 2001–02, 2002–03, 2003–04
- Portuguese League Cup: 2003–04
- Portuguese Super Cup: 2000, 2002
