= Romania men's national handball team =

National sports team

Romania

Information
- Association: Romanian Handball Federation
- Coach: George Buricea
- Assistant coach: Ionuț-Ștefan Georgescu; Ionuț Stănescu
- Most caps: Alexandru Buligan (280)
- Most goals: Vasile Stîngă (1414)

Colours
1st	2nd

Results

Summer Olympics
- Appearances: 6 (First in 1936)
- Best result: (silver) 2nd (1976)

World Championship
- Appearances: 14 (First in 1958)
- Best result: (gold) 1st (1961, 1964, 1970, 1974)

European Championship
- Appearances: 4 (First in 1994)
- Best result: 9th (1996)
- Last updated on Unknown.

Romania men's national handball team
Medal record

Representing Romania

Men's Handball

Olympic Games
Bronze medal – third place	1972 Munich	Team
Silver medal – second place	1976 Montreal	Team
Bronze medal – third place	1980 Moscow	Team
Bronze medal – third place	1984 Los Angeles	Team

World Championship
Gold medal – first place	1961 West Germany	
Gold medal – first place	1964 Czechoslovakia	
Bronze medal – third place	1967 Sweden	
Gold medal – first place	1970 France	
Gold medal – first place	1974 East Germany	
Bronze medal – third place	1990 Czechoslovakia	

World Outdoor Championship
Silver medal – second place	1959 Austria	

The Romania men's national handball team is governed by the Romanian Handball Federation (Romanian: Romanian Federaţia Română de Handbal) and takes part in international handball competitions. Romania was for many decades the most successful nation in handball with 4 gold medal wins at the World Championships, they served as a model for the sport. However, Romania has failed to win a medal since 1990.

== Competitive record ==
Champions Runners-up Third Place Fourth Place

=== Olympic Games ===
Olympic record
Games	Round	Position	Pld	W	D	L	GF	GA
(Germany) 1936 Berlin	Match for 5th place	5th of 6	3	1	0	2	19	29
Not held from 1948 to 1968
(West Germany) 1972 Munich	Third Place	3rd of 16	6	5	0	1	98	81
(Canada) 1976 Montreal	Runners-up	2nd of 12	5	3	1	1	106	90
(Soviet Union) 1980 Moscow	Third Place	3rd of 12	6	5	0	1	139	106
(United States) 1984 Los Angeles	Third Place	3rd of 12	6	5	0	1	143	110
(South Korea) 1988 Seoul	Did Not qualify							
(Spain) 1992 Barcelona	Match for 7th place	8th of 12	6	1	1	4	126	138
(United States) 1996 Atlanta	Did Not qualify							
(Australia) 2000 Sydney	Did Not qualify							
(Greece) 2004 Athens	Did Not qualify							
(China) 2008 Beijing	Did Not qualify							
(United Kingdom) 2012 London	Did Not qualify							
(Brazil) 2016 Rio de Janeiro	Did Not qualify							
(Japan) 2020 Tokyo	Did Not qualify							
(France) 2024 Paris	Did Not qualify							
(United States) 2028 Los Angeles	To be determined							
(Australia) 2032 Brisbane	To be determined							
Total	6/16	–	32	20	2	10	631	554

=== World Championship ===
World Championship record
Year	Position	GP	W	D	L	GS	GA	+/-
(Nazi Germany) 1938	did not enter							
(Sweden) 1954	did not enter							
(East Germany) 1958	13	3	0	1	2	40	50	−10
(West Germany) 1961	1	6	5	0	1	89	67	+22
(Czechoslovakia) 1964	1	6	6	0	0	136	88	+48
(Sweden) 1967	3	6	4	1	1	114	87	+27
(France) 1970	1	6	5	0	1	94	68	+26
(East Germany) 1974	1	6	5	0	1	111	81	+30
(Denmark) 1978	7	6	3	1	2	132	107	+25
(West Germany) 1982	5	7	5	0	2	174	152	+22
(Switzerland) 1986	9	7	3	0	4	146	147	−1
(Czechoslovakia) 1990	3	7	6	0	1	168	142	+26
(Sweden) 1993	10	7	2	1	4	143	152	−9
(Iceland) 1995	10	9	5	0	4	246	241	+5
(Japan) 1997	did not qualify							
(Egypt) 1999	did not qualify							
(France) 2001	did not qualify							
(Portugal) 2003	did not qualify							
(Tunisia) 2005	did not qualify							
(Germany) 2007	did not qualify							
(Croatia) 2009	15	9	5	0	4	288	268	+20
(Sweden) 2011	19	7	3	0	4	195	190	+5
(Spain) 2013	did not qualify							
(Qatar) 2015	did not qualify							
(France) 2017	did not qualify							
(Denmark) / (Germany) 2019	did not qualify							
(Egypt) 2021	did not qualify							
(Poland) / (Sweden) 2023	did not qualify							
(Croatia) / (Denmark) / (Norway) 2025	did not qualify							
(Germany) 2027	To be determined							
(France) / (Germany) 2029	To be determined							
(Denmark) / (Iceland) / (Norway) 2031	To be determined							
Total	14/29	92	57	4	31	2076	1840	+236

=== European Championship ===
European Championship record
Year	Position	GP	W	D	L	GS	GA	+/-
(Portugal) 1994	11	6	2	0	4	151	156	−5
(Spain) 1996	9	6	2	0	4	145	161	−16
(Italy) 1998	did not qualify							
(Croatia) 2000	did not qualify							
(Sweden) 2002	did not qualify							
(Slovenia) 2004	did not qualify							
(Switzerland) 2006	did not qualify							
(Norway) 2008	did not qualify							
(Austria) 2010	did not qualify							
(Serbia) 2012	did not qualify							
(Denmark) 2014	did not qualify							
(Poland) 2016	did not qualify							
(Croatia) 2018	did not qualify							
(Austria) (Sweden) (Norway) 2020	did not qualify							
(Hungary) (Slovakia) 2022	did not qualify							
(Germany) 2024	22	3	0	0	3	73	98	−25
(Denmark) (Norway) (Sweden) 2026	22	3	0	0	3	81	103	−22
(Portugal) (Spain) (Switzerland) 2028	To be determined							
(Czech Republic) (Denmark) (Poland) 2030	To be determined							
(France) (Germany) 2032	To be determined							
Total	4/20	18	4	0	14	450	518	−68

== Current squad ==
Roster for the 2026 European Men's Handball Championship.

Head coach: George Buricea

No.	Pos.	Name	Date of birth (age)	Height	App.	Goals	Club
1	GK	Ionuț Iancu	18 February 1994 (age 32)	1.92 m	90	7	(Romania) Dinamo București
2	LW	Denis Vereș	19 November 2003 (age 22)	1.77 m	13	6	(Romania) AHC Potaissa Turda
5	RW	Ionuț Nistor Ioniță	24 May 1994 (age 32)	1.87 m	51	82	(Romania) Dinamo București
6	LB	Tudor Botea	7 July 1997 (age 29)	1.94 m	41	63	(Romania) CS Minaur Baia Mare
7	LW	Alexandru Andrei	17 July 1998 (age 28)	1.80 m	21	15	(Romania) SCM Politehnica Timișoara
8	LB	Robert Militaru	4 January 1994 (age 32)	1.96 m	95	17	(Romania) Dinamo București
9	RW	Sorin Grigore	2 February 2004 (age 22)	1.93 m	13	7	(Romania) CSU Suceava
10	CB	Gabriel Cumpănici	12 October 1998 (age 27)	1.98 m	31	29	(Romania) CS Minaur Baia Mare
11	P	Robert Nagy	6 July 1997 (age 29)	1.92 m	28	25	(Romania) CS Minaur Baia Mare
13	RB	Radu Ghiță	22 November 1990 (age 35)	1.89 m	75	96	(Romania) AHC Potaissa Turda
16	GK	Mihai Cătălin Popescu	15 March 1985 (age 41)	1.95 m	249	8	(Romania) AHC Potaissa Turda
17	LB	Dan-Emil Racoțea	21 July 1995 (age 31)	2.03 m	90	77	(Poland) KS Azoty-Puławy
20	P	András Szász	24 January 1994 (age 32)	1.98 m	35	24	(Romania) SCM Politehnica Timișoara
23	P	Călin Dedu	21 October 2002 (age 23)	2.07 m	48	51	(Romania) Dinamo București
25	RB	Ionuț Adrian Stănescu	31 March 2003 (age 23)	1.92 m	15	12	(Poland) Wybrzeże Gdańsk
41	LB	Răzvan Trif	29 December 1999 (age 26)	1.92 m	10	1	(Romania) SCM Politehnica Timișoara
44	CB	Daniel Stanciuc	7 March 2004 (age 22)	1.89 m	26	83	(Romania) Dinamo București
47	LB	Andrei Buzle	3 May 1999 (age 27)	1.98 m	64	112	(Romania) Dinamo București

== Notable former players ==
- Alexandru Buligan
- Ștefan Birtalan
- Mircea Costache II
- Alexandru Dedu
- Marian Dumitru
- Cornel Durău
- Cezar Drăgăniță
- Gheorghe Gruia
- Petre Ivănescu
- Robert Licu
- Ion Mocanu
- Cornel Oțelea
- Rudi Prisăcaru
- Cornel Penu
- Vasile Stîngă
- Eliodor Voica
- Radu Voina
- Cristian Zaharia
