= Petre Ivănescu =

Romanian handball player and coach (1936–2022)

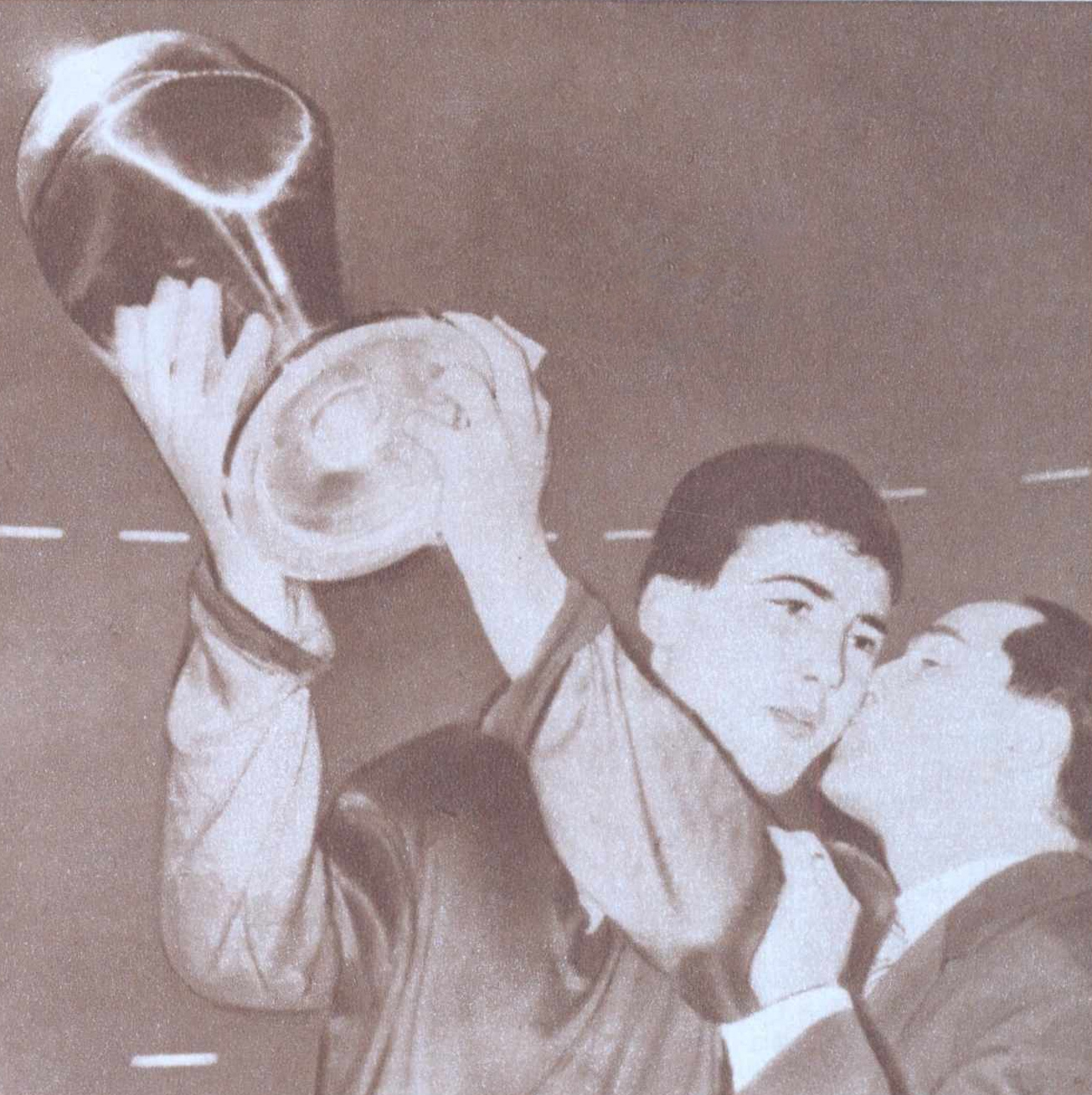
- Ivănescu lifting the European Cup trophy in 1965

Personal information
- Full name: Petre Ivănescu
- Born: 15 April 1936 Bucharest, Romania
- Died: 1 April 2022 (aged 85) Essen, North Rhine-Westphalia, Germany

Sport
- Sport: Handball

Senior clubs
- Years: Team
- 1954–1956: RAT București
- 1956–1967: Dinamo București
- 1967–1972: Phönix Essen
- 1972–1974: Brühler TV
National team
- Years: Team
- 1958–1967: Romania

Teams managed
- 1967–1972: SC Phönix Essen
- 1974–1976: TUSEM Essen
- 1976–1978: TV Oppum
- 1979–1983: VfL Gummersbach
- 1983–1986: TUSEM Essen
- 1986–1987: TSV Bayer Dormagen
- 1987–1989: West Germany (men)
- 1988–1990: TV Niederwürzbach
- 1990–1993: TUSEM Essen
- 1994–1995: OSC Rheinhausen
- 2002: VfL Gummersbach
- 2003–2005: Romania (men)
Medal record
Representing Romania
World Championship
Gold medal – first place	West Germany 1961	Team
Gold medal – first place	Czechoslovakia 1964	Team
Dinamo Bucharest
Gold medal – first place	European Cup	1964–65
Silver medal – second place	European Cup	1962–63

Petre Ivănescu (15 April 1936 – 1 April 2022) was a Romanian handball player and coach who played for Dinamo București and for the Romania national team.

== Honours ==
=== Player ===
Dinamo Bucharest

- Liga Națională: 1959, 1960, 1961, 1962, 1964, 1965, 1966
- European Cup: 1965

Romania

- World Championship: 1961, 1964

=== Coach ===
VfL Gummersbach

- Bundesliga: 1982, 1983
- DHB-Pokal: 1982, 1983
- EHF Champions League: 1983
- EHF Cup: 1982
- EHF Supercup: 1979, 1983

TUSEM Essen

- Bundesliga: 1986
- DHB-Pokal: 1991, 1992

=== Individual ===
- Handball Manager of the Year: 1987, 1988
