= Cornel Penu =

Romanian handball player (born 1946)

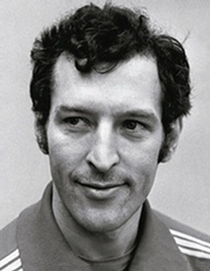

Personal information
- Born: 16 June 1946 (age 80) Buzău, Romania
- Height: 191 cm (6 ft 3 in)
- Weight: 87 kg (192 lb)

Sport
- Sport: Handball
- Club: Dinamo Bucharest
Medal record
Representing Romania
Olympic Games
| Bronze medal – third place | 1972 Munich | Team |
| Silver medal – second place | 1976 Montreal | Team |
World Championship
| Bronze medal – third place | 1967 Sweden | Team |
| Gold medal – first place | 1970 France | Team |
| Gold medal – first place | 1974 East Germany | Team |

Cornel Penu (born 16 June 1946) is a retired Romanian handball goalkeeper. He earned 257 caps with the national team and won the world title in 1970 and 1974 and two Olympic medals in 1972 and 1976. He was named Best Goalkeeper at the 1974 World Championships, and was selected for the World Team three times: in 1973, 1975 and 1976.

Penu took up handball in his hometown in 1958, and after enrolling to the University of Galați he played for Știința Galați. He graduated in 1968 from the Machine Construction Technology Department. The same year he moved to Dinamo Bucharest, where he stayed until his retirement in 1980. After that he coached goalkeepers for Dinamo Bucharest and for the Romanian national team. He left Romania in 1993 to work as a coach in Morocco, and as of 2012 he was living in France.

One of Penu's hobbies is painting.

== Distinctions ==
- Honored Master of Sport, 1970
- Honored Citizen of Buzău, 2011

== Bibliography ==
- Hristache Naum, Ultimul apărător, 1983, Ed. Sport-Turism, Bucharest, 207 p.
