= IHF World Men's Handball Championship =

International handball tournament for men's national teams

- Current season, competition or edition: 2027 World Men's Handball Championship
- Sport: Handball
- Founded: 1938; 88 years ago
- Founder: International Amateur Handball Federation
- First season: 1938
- No. of teams: 32 (finals)
- Continent: International (IHF)
- Most recent champion: Denmark (4th title)
- Most titles: France (6 titles)

The IHF Men's Handball World Championship has been organized indoor by the International Handball Federation since 1938.

In the twenty-nine tournaments held, twelve national teams have won the title. France is the most successful team with six titles, followed by Sweden, Denmark and Romania with four titles each.

The current champion is Denmark, which won its fourth consecutive title at the 2025 tournament in Croatia, Denmark and Norway.

== History ==
The first indoor championship took place in Germany in 1938, involving four teams from Europe made up of 7 players who competed in a round robin stage to find a winner. The second World Championship was not held until sixteen years later in the country of Sweden. Throughout their history, the World Championships have been dominated by European teams, with no medals being won by non-European countries until 2015, by Qatar. Over the years, the format of the World Championships has changed. Initially, there were group games in both the preliminary and main rounds, but since the 1995 edition a knockout system has been applied after the preliminary round.

== Tournaments ==
#	Year	Host	Final			Third place match			Teams
#	Year	Host	Champions	Score	Runners-up	Third place	Score	Fourth place	Teams
1	1938; Details	(Nazi Germany); Germany	Germany	Round-robin	Austria	Sweden	Round-robin	Denmark	4
2	1954; Details	Sweden	Sweden	17–14	Germany (Note: In 1954, Germany sent a team fully composed of players from West Germany.)	Czechoslovakia	24–11	Switzerland	6
3	1958; Details	East Germany	Sweden	22–12	Czechoslovakia	Germany (Note: In 1958 and 1961, Germany sent a united team composed of players from West Germany and East Germany.)	16–13	Denmark	16
4	1961; Details	West Germany	Romania	9–8 (2ET)	Czechoslovakia	Sweden	17–14	Germany	12
5	1964; Details	Czechoslovakia	Romania	25–22	Sweden	Czechoslovakia	22–15	West Germany	16
6	1967; Details	Sweden	Czechoslovakia	14–11	Denmark	Romania	21–19 (ET)	Soviet Union	16
7	1970; Details	France	Romania	13–12 (2ET)	East Germany	Yugoslavia	29–12	Denmark	16
8	1974; Details	East Germany	Romania	14–12	East Germany	Yugoslavia	18–16	Poland	16
9	1978; Details	Denmark	West Germany	20–19	Soviet Union	East Germany	19–15	Denmark	16
10	1982; Details	West Germany	Soviet Union	30–27 (ET)	Yugoslavia	Poland	23–22	Denmark	16
11	1986; Details	Switzerland	Yugoslavia	24–22	Hungary	East Germany	24–23	Sweden	16
12	1990; Details	Czechoslovakia	Sweden	27–23	Soviet Union	Romania	27–21	Yugoslavia	16
13	1993; Details	Sweden	Russia	28–19	France	Sweden	26–19	Switzerland	16
14	1995; Details	Iceland	France	23–19	Croatia	Sweden	26–20	Germany	24
15	1997; Details	Japan	Russia	23–21	Sweden	France	28–27	Hungary	24
16	1999; Details	Egypt	Sweden	25–24	Russia	FR Yugoslavia	27–24	Spain	24
17	2001; Details	France	France	28–25 (ET)	Sweden	FR Yugoslavia	27–17	Egypt	24
18	2003; Details	Portugal	Croatia	34–31	Germany	France	27–22	Spain	24
19	2005; Details	Tunisia	Spain	40–34	Croatia	France	26–25	Tunisia	24
20	2007; Details	Germany	Germany	29–24	Poland	Denmark	34–27	France	24
21	2009; Details	Croatia	France	24–19	Croatia	Poland	31–23	Denmark	24
22	2011; Details	Sweden	France	37–35 (ET)	Denmark	Spain	24–23	Sweden	24
23	2013; Details	Spain	Spain	35–19	Denmark	Croatia	31–26	Slovenia	24
24	2015; Details	Qatar	France	25–22	Qatar	Poland	29–28 (ET)	Spain	24
25	2017; Details	France	France	33–26	Norway	Slovenia	31–30	Croatia	24
26	2019; Details	Denmark / Germany	Denmark	31–22	Norway	France	26–25	Germany	24
27	2021; Details	Egypt	Denmark	26–24	Sweden	Spain	35–29	France	32
28	2023; Details	Poland / Sweden	Denmark	34–29	France	Spain	39–36	Sweden	32
29	2025; Details	Croatia / Denmark / Norway	Denmark	32–26	Croatia	France	35–34	Portugal	32
30	2027; Details	Germany							32
31	2029; Details	France / Germany							32
32	2031; Details	Denmark / Iceland / Norway							32

== Medal table ==
Rank	Nation	Gold	Silver	Bronze	Total
1	France	6	2	5	13
2	Sweden	4	4	4	12
3	Denmark	4	3	1	8
4	Romania	4	0	2	6
5	Germany (Note: West Germany won 1 gold medal, East Germany won 2 silver and 2 bronze medals.)	3	4	3	10
6	Russia (Note: Soviet Union won 1 gold, 2 silver medals.)	3	3	0	6
7	Spain	2	0	3	5
8	Croatia	1	4	1	6
9	Czechoslovakia	1	2	2	5
10	Serbia (Note: Yugoslavia won 1 gold, 1 silver and 2 bronze medals, Serbia and Montenegro won 2 bronze medals.)	1	1	4	6
11	Norway	0	2	0	2
12	Poland	0	1	3	4
13	Austria	0	1	0	1
13	Hungary	0	1	0	1
13	Qatar	0	1	0	1
16	Slovenia	0	0	1	1
Totals (16 entries)		29	29	29	87

== Participating nations ==
Legend

- 1st – Champions
- 2nd – Runners-up
- 3rd – Third place
- 4th – Fourth place
- 5th – Fifth place
- 6th – Sixth place
- 7th – Seventh place
- 8th – Eighth place
- 9th – Ninth place
- 10th – Tenth place
- 11th – Eleventh place
- 12th to 24th – Twelfth to twenty-fourth place
- Q — Qualified for upcoming tournament
- •• — Qualified but withdrew
- • — Did not qualify
- × — Did not enter / Withdrew from the World Championship / Banned
- — Hosts

Team	(Germany); 1938	(Sweden); 1954	(East Germany); 1958	(West Germany); 1961	(Czechoslovakia); 1964	(Sweden); 1967	(France); 1970	(East Germany); 1974	(Denmark); 1978	(West Germany); 1982	(Switzerland); 1986	(Czechoslovakia); 1990	(Sweden); 1993	(Iceland); 1995	(Japan); 1997	(Egypt); 1999	(France); 2001	(Portugal); 2003	(Tunisia); 2005	(Germany); 2007	(Croatia); 2009	(Sweden); 2011	(Spain); 2013	(Qatar); 2015	(France); 2017	(Denmark) (Germany); 2019	(Egypt); 2021	(Poland) (Sweden); 2023	(Croatia) (Denmark) (Norway); 2025	(Germany); 2027	(France) (Germany); 2029	(Denmark) (Iceland) (Norway); 2031	Total
Algeria	Part of France				×	×	×	15th	•	16th	16th	16th	•	16th	17th	15th	13th	18th	17th	•	19th	15th	17th	24th	•	•	22nd	31st	30th	Q			18
Angola	Part of Portugal								•	•	•	•	×	×	×	•	×	•	20th	21st	•	•	•	•	24th	23rd	30th	•	•	Q			6
Argentina	×	×	×	×	×	×	×	•	•	•	•	•	•	•	22nd	21st	15th	17th	18th	16th	18th	12th	18th	12th	18th	17th	11th	19th	20th	Q			16
Australia	×	×	×	×	×	×	×	×	•	•	•	•	•	•	•	24th	•	21st	24th	24th	24th	24th	24th	•	×	•	•	•	×	•			7
Austria	2nd	×	11th	•	•	•	•	•	•	•	•	•	14th	•	•	•	•	•	•	•	•	18th	•	13th	•	19th	26th	•	17th	•			8
Bahrain	Part of Great Britain							×	•	•	•	•	•	•	•	•	•	•	•	•	•	23rd	•	••	23rd	20th	21st	16th	29th	Q			7
Belarus	Part of Soviet Union												•	9th	•	•	•	•	•	•	•	•	15th	18th	11th	•	17th	×	×	×			5
Belgium	×	×	×	×	×	×	×	×	•	•	•	•	•	•	•	•	•	•	•	•	•	•	•	•	•	•	•	21st	•	•			1
Bosnia and Herzegovina	Part of Yugoslavia												•	•	•	•	•	•	•	•	•	•	•	20th	•	•	•	•	•	•			1
Brazil	×	×	15th	×	×	×	×	•	•	•	•	•	•	24th	24th	16th	19th	22nd	19th	19th	21st	21st	13th	16th	16th	9th	18th	17th	7th	Q			18
Bulgaria	×	×	×	×	×	×	•	11th	14th	•	•	•	•	•	•	•	•	•	•	•	•	•	•	•	•	•	•	•	×	×			2
Canada	×	×	×	×	•	16th	•	×	15th	•	•	•	•	•	•	•	•	•	23rd	•	•	•	•	•	•	•	•	×	•	•			3
Cape Verde	Part of Portugal								×	×	×	×	×	×	×	×	×	×	×	×	×	×	×	×	×	×	32nd	23rd	23rd	Q			4
Chile	×	×	×	×	×	×	×	×	•	•	•	•	•	•	•	•	•	•	•	•	•	22nd	23rd	23rd	21st	16th	27th	26th	24th	Q			9
China	×	×	×	×	×	×	×	×	•	•	•	•	•	•	20th	20th	•	•	•	•	•	•	•	•	•	•	•	×	•	•			2
Croatia	Part of Yugoslavia												•	2nd	13th	10th	9th	1st	2nd	5th	2nd	5th	3rd	6th	4th	6th	15th	9th	2nd	Q			17
Cuba	×	×	×	×	×	×	×	×	•	13th	15th	14th	•	13th	14th	8th	•	×	×	×	20th	•	×	×	×	×	×	•	32nd	×			8
Czech Republic	See Czechoslovakia													8th	11th	•	18th	•	10th	12th	•	•	•	17th	•	•	••	•	19th	•			7
Denmark	4th	5th	4th	5th	7th	2nd	4th	8th	4th	4th	7th	•	9th	19th	•	9th	•	9th	13th	3rd	4th	2nd	2nd	5th	10th	1st	1st	1st	1st	Q		Q	27
DR Congo	×	×	×	×	×	×	×	×	•	×	×	×	•	×	×	×	•	•	•	•	•	•	•	•	•	•	28th	•	•	×			1
Egypt	×	×	×	×	14th	×	×	×	•	•	•	•	12th	6th	6th	7th	4th	15th	14th	17th	14th	14th	16th	14th	13th	8th	7th	7th	5th	Q			19
Faroe Islands	×	×	×	×	×	×	×	×	×	•	•	×	×	×	×	×	×	×	×	×	•	•	×	×	×	•	•	•	•	Q			1
Finland	×	•	14th	•	•	•	•	×	•	•	•	•	•	•	•	•	•	•	•	•	•	•	•	•	•	•	•	•	•	•			1
France	×	6th	9th	8th	13th	10th	12th	•	16th	•	•	9th	2nd	1st	3rd	6th	1st	3rd	3rd	4th	1st	1st	6th	1st	1st	3rd	4th	2nd	3rd	Q	Q		27
Germany (including West Germany)	1st	2nd	3rd	4th	4th	6th	5th	9th	1st	7th	7th	•	6th	4th	•	5th	8th	2nd	9th	1st	5th	11th	5th	7th	9th	4th	12th	5th	6th	Q	Q		29
Greece	×	×	×	×	×	×	×	×	•	•	•	•	•	•	•	•	•	•	6th	•	•	•	•	•	•	•	•	•	•	Q			2
Greenland	×	×	×	×	×	×	×	×	•	•	•	•	•	•	•	•	20th	24th	•	22nd	•	•	•	•	•	•	•	•	•	•			3
Guinea	×	×	×	×	×	×	×	×	×	•	×	×	×	×	×	×	×	×	×	×	×	×	×	×	×	×	•	•	31st	•			1
Hungary	×	•	7th	•	8th	8th	8th	7th	9th	9th	2nd	6th	11th	17th	4th	11th	•	6th	•	9th	6th	7th	8th	•	7th	10th	5th	8th	8th	•			23
Iceland	×	×	10th	6th	9th	•	11th	14th	13th	•	6th	10th	8th	14th	5th	•	11th	7th	15th	8th	•	6th	12th	11th	14th	11th	20th	12th	9th	Q		Q	25
Iran	×	×	×	×	×	×	×	×	•	•	•	•	•	•	•	•	•	•	•	•	•	•	•	21st	•	•	•	24th	•	•			2
Italy	×	×	×	×	×	×	×	•	•	•	•	•	•	•	18th	•	•	•	•	•	•	•	•	•	•	•	•	•	16th	Q			3
Japan	×	×	×	12th	16th	11th	10th	12th	12th	14th	•	15th	•	23rd	15th	•	•	•	16th	•	•	16th	•	•	22nd	24th	19th	×	28th	Q			17
Kuwait	×	×	×	×	×	×	×	×	•	15th	•	•	•	20th	•	19th	23rd	20th	22nd	19th	22nd	•	•	•	•	•	•	•	27th	Q			10
Lithuania	Part of Soviet Union												•	•	10th	•	•	•	•	•	•	•	•	•	•	•	•	•	•	•			1
Luxembourg	×	×	16th	•	•	×	•	•	•	•	•	•	•	•	•	•	•	•	•	•	•	•	•	•	•	•	•	•	•	•			1
Montenegro	Part of Yugoslavia												Part of Serbia and Montenegro							•	•	•	22nd	•	•	•	•	18th	•	•			2
Morocco	(France) / (Spain)		×	×	×	×	•	×	•	×	×	•	•	22nd	23rd	17th	22nd	23rd	•	20th	•	•	•	•	•	•	29th	30th	•	•			8
Netherlands	×	×	×	11th	×	•	•	•	•	•	•	•	•	•	•	•	•	•	•	•	•	•	•	•	•	•	•	14th	12th	•			3
Nigeria	×	×	×	×	×	×	×	×	•	•	•	×	×	×	•	23rd	×	•	×	•	•	•	×	•	•	•	•	•	•	•			1
North Macedonia	Part of Yugoslavia												•	•	•	18th	•	•	•	•	11th	•	14th	9th	15th	15th	23rd	27th	15th	Q			10
Norway	×	•	6th	7th	11th	13th	13th	•	•	•	•	•	13th	•	12th	13th	14th	•	7th	13th	9th	9th	•	•	2nd	2nd	6th	6th	10th	Q		Q	20
Poland	×	×	5th	•	•	12th	14th	4th	6th	3rd	14th	11th	•	•	•	•	•	10th	•	2nd	3rd	8th	9th	3rd	17th	•	13th	15th	25th	Q			19
Portugal	×	×	×	•	×	×	•	•	•	•	•	•	•	•	19th	•	16th	12th	•	•	•	•	•	•	•	•	10th	13th	4th	Q			7
Qatar	Part of Great Britain							×	•	•	•	•	•	•	•	•	•	16th	21st	23rd	•	•	20th	2nd	8th	13th	8th	22nd	21st	Q			11
Romania	×	×	13th	1st	1st	3rd	1st	1st	7th	5th	9th	3rd	10th	10th	•	•	•	•	•	•	15th	19th	•	•	•	•	•	•	•	•			14
Russia	See Soviet Union												1st	5th	1st	2nd	6th	5th	8th	6th	16th	•	7th	19th	12th	14th	14th	×	×	×			14 (Note: Russia's total includes one appearance as Russian Handball Federation in 2021.)
Saudi Arabia	×	×	×	×	×	×	×	×	•	•	•	•	•	•	21st	22nd	21st	19th	•	•	23rd	•	19th	22nd	20th	21st	•	29th	•	•	Q		11
Serbia	Part of Yugoslavia												Part of Serbia and Montenegro							•	8th	10th	10th	•	•	18th	•	11th	•	Q			6
Slovakia	See Czechoslovakia													•	•	•	•	•	•	•	10th	17th	•	•	•	•	•	•	•	•			2
Slovenia	Part of Yugoslavia												•	18th	•	•	17th	11th	12th	10th	•	•	4th	8th	3rd	•	9th	10th	13th	Q			12
South Korea	×	×	×	×	×	×	×	×	•	•	12th	12th	15th	12th	8th	14th	12th	•	•	15th	12th	13th	21st	•	•	(Korea) S.	31st	28th	•	•			13
Spain	×	•	12th	•	•	•	•	13th	10th	8th	5th	5th	5th	11th	7th	4th	5th	4th	1st	7th	13th	3rd	1st	4th	5th	7th	3rd	3rd	18th	Q			24
Sweden	3rd	1st	1st	3rd	2nd	5th	6th	10th	8th	11th	4th	1st	3rd	3rd	2nd	1st	2nd	13th	11th	•	7th	4th	•	10th	6th	5th	2nd	4th	14th	Q			28
Switzerland	×	4th	×	10th	12th	14th	15th	•	•	12th	11th	13th	4th	7th	•	•	•	•	•	•	•	•	•	•	•	•	16th	•	11th	•			12
Tunisia	France		×	×	×	15th	×	•	•	•	•	•	•	15th	16th	12th	10th	14th	4th	11th	17th	20th	11th	15th	19th	12th	25th	25th	22nd	Q			18
Turkey	×	×	×	×	×	×	×	•	•	•	•	•	•	•	•	•	•	•	•	•	•	•	•	•	•	•	•	•	•	Q			1
Ukraine	Part of Soviet Union												•	•	•	•	7th	•	•	14th	•	•	•	•	•	•	•	•	•	•			2
United States	×	×	×	×	15th	•	16th	16th	•	•	•	•	16th	21st	•	•	24th	•	•	•	•	•	•	•	•	•	••	20th	26th	Q			9
Uruguay	×	×	×	×	×	×	×	×	•	•	•	•	•	•	•	•	•	•	•	•	•	•	•	•	•	•	24th	32nd	•	Q			3
Discontinued teams
Czechoslovakia	×	3rd	2nd	2nd	3rd	1st	7th	6th	11th	10th	13th	7th	7th	See Czech Republic																			12
East Germany	(Germany)	×	(Germany)	(Germany)	10th	9th	2nd	2nd	3rd	6th	3rd	8th	See Germany																				8
Korea	See North Korea and South Korea																									22nd	North Korea / South Korea						1
Serbia and Montenegro	Part of Yugoslavia												•	•	9th	3rd	3rd	8th	5th	See Serbia and Montenegro													5
Soviet Union	×	×	×	•	5th	4th	9th	5th	2nd	1st	10th	2nd	See Russia																				8
Yugoslavia	×	×	8th	9th	6th	7th	3rd	3rd	5th	2nd	1st	4th																					10
Total	4	6	16	12	16	16	16	16	16	16	16	16	16	24	24	24	24	24	24	24	24	24	24	24	24	24	32	32	32	32	32	32	

== Statistics ==
=== List of hosts ===
List of hosts by number of championships hosted.

Times hosted	Host	Year(s)
9	Germany (including East* and West Germany**)	1938, 1958*, 1961**, 1974*, 1982**, 2007, 2019, (2027, 2029)
5	Sweden	1954, 1967, 1993, 2011, 2023
4	Denmark	1978, 2019, 2025, (2031)
4	France	1970, 2001, 2017, (2029)
2	Croatia	2009, 2025
2	Czechoslovakia	1964, 1990
2	Egypt	1999, 2021
2	Iceland	1995, (2031)
2	Norway	2025, (2031)
1	Japan	1997
1	Poland	2023
1	Portugal	2003
1	Qatar	2015
1	Spain	2013
1	Switzerland	1986
1	Tunisia	2005

=== All-time table for semi-finalists (1938–2025) ===
Team	Participations					Games						
Team	Nb	Titles	%	Top 4	%	Pld	W	%	D	%	L	%
Austria	8	0	0,0 %	1	12,5 %	45	17	37,8 %	4	8,9 %	24	53,3 %
Croatia	16	1	6,3 %	7	43,8 %	132	95	72,0 %	7	5,3 %	30	22,7 %
Czechoslovakia	12	1	8,3 %	5	41,7 %	72	41	56,9 %	7	9,7 %	24	33,3 %
Denmark	26	4	15,4 %	14	53,8 %	183	124	67,8 %	8	4,4 %	51	27,9 %
East Germany	8	0	0,0 %	4	50,0 %	45	24	53,3 %	6	13,3 %	15	33,3 %
Egypt	18	0	0,0 %	1	5,6 %	130	60	46,2 %	8	6,2 %	62	47,7 %
France	25	6	24,0 %	15	60,0 %	188	130	69,1 %	7	3,7 %	51	27,1 %
Germany	20	2	10,0 %	8	40,0 %	152	104	68,4 %	11	7,2 %	37	24,3 %
Hungary	23	0	0,0 %	2	8,7 %	164	84	51,2 %	11	6,7 %	69	42,1 %
Norway	18	0	0,0 %	2	11,1 %	119	65	54,6 %	7	5,9 %	47	39,5 %
Poland	18	0	0,0 %	5	27,8 %	121	66	54,5 %	6	5,0 %	49	40,5 %
Portugal	6	0	0,0 %	1	16,7 %	39	20	51,3 %	2	5,1 %	17	43,6 %
Qatar	10	0	0,0 %	1	10,0 %	67	24	35,8 %	0	0,0 %	43	64,2 %
Romania	14	4	28,6 %	6	42,9 %	92	57	62,0 %	4	4,8 %	31	33,7 %
Russia (Note: Not including 2021 results (3 victories, 1 draw and 2 loses in 6 matches) because the team participated as the Russian Handball Federation in accordance with a ban by WADA and a decision by CAS.)	13	2	15,4 %	3	23,1 %	107	66	61,7 %	8	7,5 %	33	30,8 %
Slovenia	11	0	0,0 %	2	18,2 %	79	40	50,6 %	5	6,3 %	34	43,0 %
Soviet Union	8	1	12,5 %	4	50,0 %	51	35	68,6 %	2	3,9 %	14	27,5 %
Spain	23	2	8,7 %	8	34,8 %	182	124	68,1 %	9	4,9 %	49	26,9 %
Sweden	27	4	14,8 %	15	55,6 %	193	131	67,9 %	8	4,1 %	54	28,0 %
Switzerland	12	0	0,0 %	2	16,7 %	62	25	40,3 %	5	8,1 %	32	51,6 %
Tunisia	17	0	0,0 %	1	5,6 %	116	44	37,9 %	10	8,6 %	62	53,4 %
West Germany	7	1	14,3 %	2	28,6 %	44	28	63,6 %	4	9,1 %	12	27,3 %
Yugoslavia (Note: Competed as SFR Yugoslavia in 1958–1990.)	10	1	10,0 %	5	50,0 %	59	35	59,3 %	5	8,5 %	19	32,2 %
FR Yugoslavia (Note: Competed as FR Yugoslavia in 1997–2003 and as Serbia and Montenegro in 2005.)	5	0	0,0 %	2	40,0 %	42	27	64,3 %	4	9,5 %	11	26,2 %

Draws include knockout matches decided in a penalty shootout.

== Most successful players ==
Boldface denotes active handball players and highest medal count among all players (including these who are not included in these tables) per type.

=== Multiple gold medalists ===
Rank	Player	Country	From	To	Gold	Silver	Bronze	Total
1	Thierry Omeyer	France	2001	2017	**5**	–	2	**7**
2	Nikola Karabatić	France	2005	2023	4	1	2	**7**
3	**Mads Mensah Larsen**	Denmark	2013	2025	4	1	–	5
3	Henrik Møllgaard	Denmark	2013	2025	4	1	–	5
5	Jérôme Fernandez	France	2001	2015	4	–	2	6
5	Michaël Guigou	France	2005	2019	4	–	2	6
5	Daniel Narcisse	France	2001	2017	4	–	2	6
8	**Cédric Sorhaindo**	France	2009	2019	4	–	1	5
9	**Simon Hald**	Denmark	2019	2025	4	–	–	4
9	**Jóhan Hansen**	Denmark	2019	2025	4	–	–	4
9	**Magnus Landin Jacobsen**	Denmark	2019	2025	4	–	–	4

=== Multiple medalists ===
The table shows players who have won at least 6 medals in total at the World Championships.

Rank	Player	Country	From	To	Gold	Silver	Bronze	Total
1	Thierry Omeyer	France	2001	2017	**5**	–	2	**7**
2	Nikola Karabatić	France	2005	2023	4	1	2	**7**
3	Jérôme Fernandez	France	2001	2015	4	–	2	6
3	Michaël Guigou	France	2005	2019	4	–	2	6
3	Daniel Narcisse	France	2001	2017	4	–	2	6
6	Magnus Andersson	Sweden	1990	2001	2	2	2	6
6	Ola Lindgren	Sweden	1990	2001	2	2	2	6
6	Magnus Wislander	Sweden	1990	2001	2	2	2	6
9	Jackson Richardson	France	1993	2005	2	1	**3**	6

== Top scorers by tournament ==
The record-holder for scored goals in a single World Championship is Kiril Lazarov. He scored 92 goals for Macedonia in nine matches at the 2009 World Championship.

Year	Player	Goals
1938	(Sweden) Yngve Lamberg (Germany) Hans-Werner Obermark (Germany) Hans Theilig	6
1954	(Germany) Otto Maychrzak	16
1958	(Denmark) Mogens Olsen	46
1961	(Romania) Petre Ivănescu (Czechoslovakia) Zdeněk Rada	24
1964	(Romania) Hans (Ioan) Moser	33
1967	(West Germany) Herbert Lübking	38
1970	(Soviet Union) Vladimir Maksimov	31
1974	(Romania) Ștefan Birtalan	43
1978	(Poland) Jerzy Klempel (Hungary) Péter Kovács	47
1982	(Romania) Vasile Stîngă	65
1986	(South Korea) Kang Jae-won	67
1990	(Cuba) Roberto Julián Duranona (Soviet Union) Aleksandr Tuchkin	55
1993	(Switzerland) Marc Baumgartner (Hungary) József Éles (South Korea) Yoon Kyung-shin	41
1995	(South Korea) Yoon Kyung-shin	86
1997	(South Korea) Yoon Kyung-shin	62
1999	(Cuba) Rolando Uríos	57
2001	(Russia) Eduard Koksharov	61
2003	(Hungary) Carlos Pérez	64
2005	(Tunisia) Wissem Hmam	81
2007	(Iceland) Guðjón Valur Sigurðsson	66
2009	(North Macedonia) Kiril Lazarov	92
2011	(Denmark) Mikkel Hansen	68
2013	(Denmark) Anders Eggert	62
2015	(Slovenia) Dragan Gajić	71
2017	(North Macedonia) Kiril Lazarov	50
2019	(Denmark) Mikkel Hansen	72
2021	(Qatar) Frankis Carol	58
2023	(Denmark) Mathias Gidsel	60
2025	(Denmark) Mathias Gidsel	74

== See also ==
- IHF World Women's Handball Championship
- IHF World Men's Outdoor Handball Championship
