= 1964 World Men's Handball Championship =

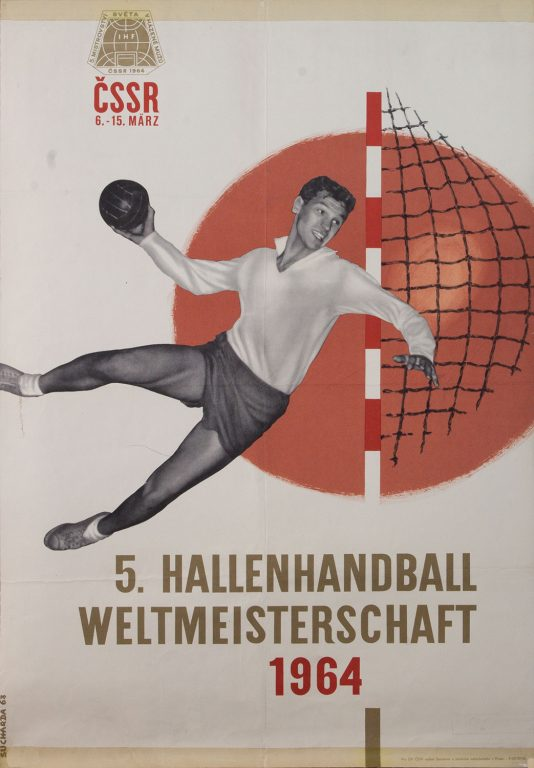
- Poster

Tournament details
- Host country: Czechoslovakia
- Venues: 4 (in 4 host cities)
- Dates: 6–15 March
- Teams: 16 (from 4 confederations)

Final positions
- Champions: Romania (2nd title)
- Runners-up: Sweden
- Third place: Czechoslovakia
- Fourth place: West Germany

Tournament statistics
- Matches played: 36
- Goals scored: 1,171 (32.53 per match)
- Top scorer: uncertain

The 1964 World Men's Handball Championship was the fifth team handball World Championship. It was held in Czechoslovakia. Romania won the championship.

== Preliminary round ==
=== Group A ===
All games are played in Gottwaldov.

Team	Games	Goals	Points
West Germany	3	50-37	5
Yugoslavia	3	50-31	4
East Germany	3	44-35	3
United States	3	25-66	0

Date	Match	Score
6 mar	West Germany - Yugoslavia	14-14 (8-8)
6 mar	East Germany - USA	20-9 (9-4)
7 mar	Yugoslavia - USA	22-3 (13-2)
7 mar	West Germany - East Germany	12-10 (7-5)
9 mar	East Germany - Yugoslavia	14-14 (10-7)
9 mar	West Germany - USA	24-13 (9-7)

=== Group B ===
All games are played in Bratislava.

Team	Games	Goals	Points
Sweden	3	51-31	4
Hungary	3	45-36	4
Iceland	3	40-39	4
Egypt	3	28-58	0

Date	Match	Score
6 mar	Sweden - Hungary	15-8 (8-4)
6 mar	Iceland - Egypt	16-8 (8-5)
7 mar	Hungary - Egypt	16-9 (9-3)
7 mar	Iceland - Sweden	12-10 (7-5)
9 mar	Hungary - Iceland	21-12 (9-7)
9 mar	Sweden - Egypt	26-11 (14-3)

=== Group C ===
All games are played in Prague.

Team	Games	Goals	Points
Czechoslovakia	3	63-35	6
Denmark	3	53-40	4
Switzerland	3	38-56	2
France	3	41-64	0

Date	Match	Score
6 mar	Czechoslovakia - France	23-14 (12-7)
6 mar	Denmark - Switzerland	16-13 (8-5)
7 mar	Switzerland - France	15-14 (9-6)
7 mar	Czechoslovakia - Denmark	14-11 (7-7)
9 mar	Denmark - France	26-13 (13-5)
9 mar	Czechoslovakia - Switzerland	26-10 (15-3)

=== Group D ===
All games are played in Pardubice.

Team	Games	Goals	Points
Romania	3	70-36	6
Soviet Union	3	65-39	2
Norway	3	37-47	2
Japan	3	40-90	2

Date	Match	Score
6 mar	Romania - Soviet Union	16-14 (7-8)
6 mar	Japan - Norway	18-14 (9-4)
7 mar	Soviet Union - Japan	40-10 (23-6)
7 mar	Romania- Norway	18-10 (11-7)
9 mar	Norway - Soviet Union	13-11 (6-7)
9 mar	Romania - Japan	36-12 (16-7)

== Main round ==
Results from Preliminary round carried over to Main round. All games are played in Prague.

=== Group 1 ===
Team	Games	Goals	Points
Sweden	3	46-42	4
West Germany	3	45-41	3
Yugoslavia	3	48-52	3
Hungary	3	42-46	2

Date	Match	Score
11 mar	Hungary - West Germany	19-15 (7-7)
11 mar	Sweden - Yugoslavia	23-18 (10-11)
13 mar	Yugoslavia - Hungary	16-15 (9-7)
13 mar	West Germany - Sweden	16-8 (8-5)

=== Group 2 ===
Team	Games	Goals	Points
Romania	3	57-44	6
Czechoslovakia	3	47-42	4
Soviet Union	3	46-48	2
Denmark	3	40-56	0

Date	Match	Score
11 mar	Czechoslovakia - Soviet Union	18-15 (9-8)
11 mar	Romania - Denmark	25-15 (10-7)
13 mar	Soviet Union - Denmark	17-14 (10-10)
13 mar	Romania - Czechoslovakia	16-15 (9-7)

== Final round ==
All games are played in Prague.

Game	Date	Match	Score
Match for 7th Place	14 March	Denmark - Hungary	23-14 (8-6)
Match for 5th place	15 March	Soviet Union - Yugoslavia	27-18 (13-9)
Bronze Medal Game	14 March	Czechoslovakia - West Germany	22-15 (8-7)
Final	15 March	Romania - Sweden	25-22 (14-13)

== Final standings ==
Gold medal	Romania
Silver medal	Sweden
Bronze medal	Czechoslovakia
4	West Germany
5	Soviet Union
6	Yugoslavia
7	Denmark
8	Hungary
9	Iceland
10	East Germany
11	Norway
12	Switzerland
13	Japan
14	France
15	Egypt
16	United States

== Awards ==
All-star team (named by Československy sport):

- (Socialist Federal Republic of Yugoslavia) Zlatko Žagmešter
