= 2023 World Men's Handball Championship =

28th event hosted by the International Handball Federation

Världmästerskapet i handboll för herrar 2023 (in Swedish) Mistrzostwa Świata w Piłce Ręcznej Mężczyzn 2023 (in Polish)

Tournament details
- Host countries: Poland; Sweden
- Venues: 9 (in 9 host cities)
- Dates: 11–29 January
- Teams: 32 (from 5 confederations)

Final positions
- Champions: Denmark (3rd title)
- Runners-up: France
- Third place: Spain
- Fourth place: Sweden

Tournament statistics
- Matches played: 112
- Goals scored: 6,555 (58.53 per match)
- Attendance: 618,112 (5,519 per match)
- Top scorers: (Denmark) Mathias Gidsel (60 goals)

Awards
- Best player: (Denmark) Mathias Gidsel

The 2023 IHF World Men's Handball Championship was the 28th such event hosted by the International Handball Federation. It was held in Poland and Sweden from 11 to 29 January 2023.

Denmark were the two-time defending champions, having won the 2019 and 2021 editions, and successfully defended their title by defeating France 34–29 in the final. In doing so, Denmark became the first men's national handball team to win three consecutive world titles. Spain beat the hosts and European champions Sweden to win a World Championship bronze medal for the third time, the second in consecutive editions.

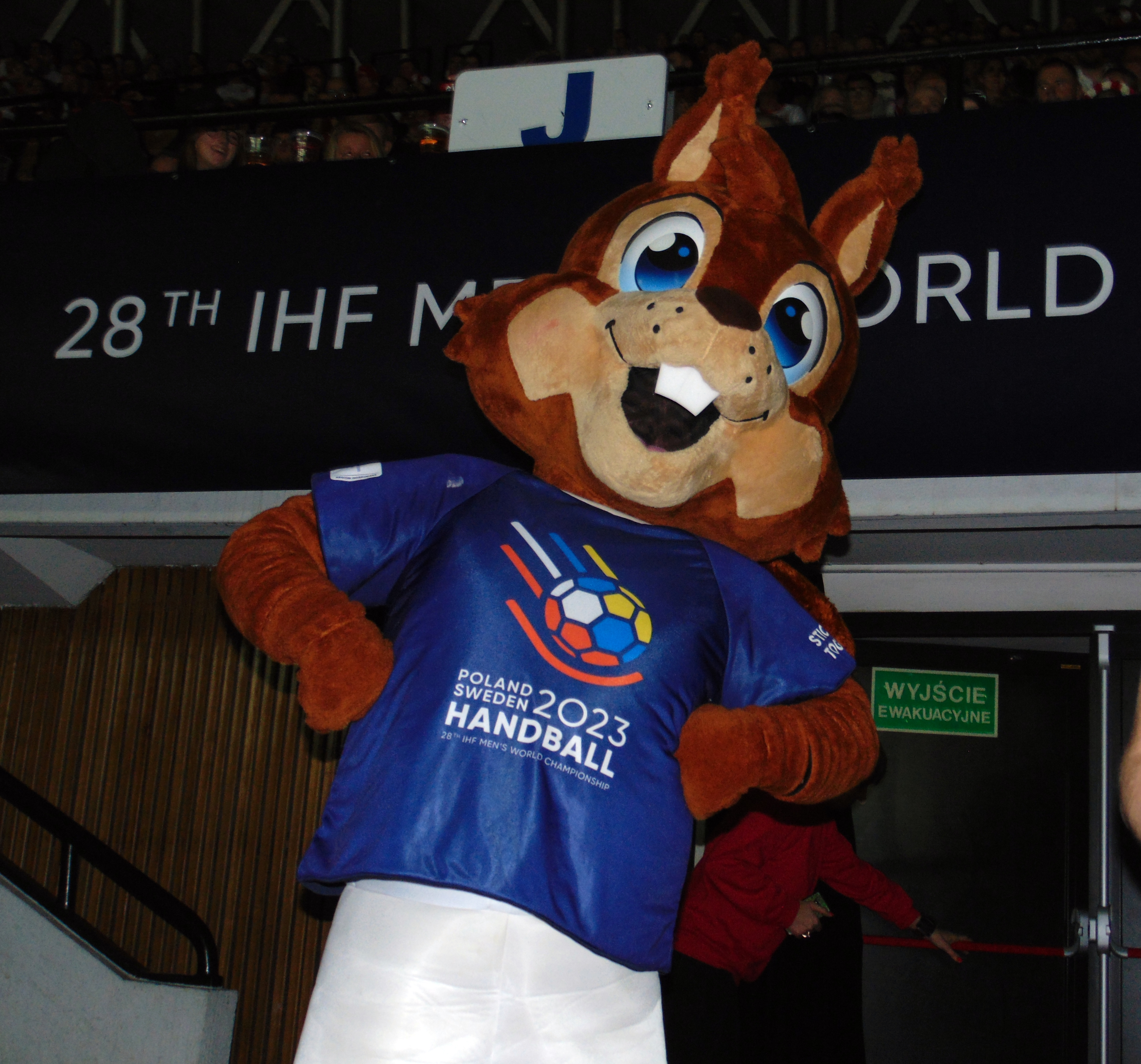
Pax, the official mascot of the World Men's Handball Championship 2023

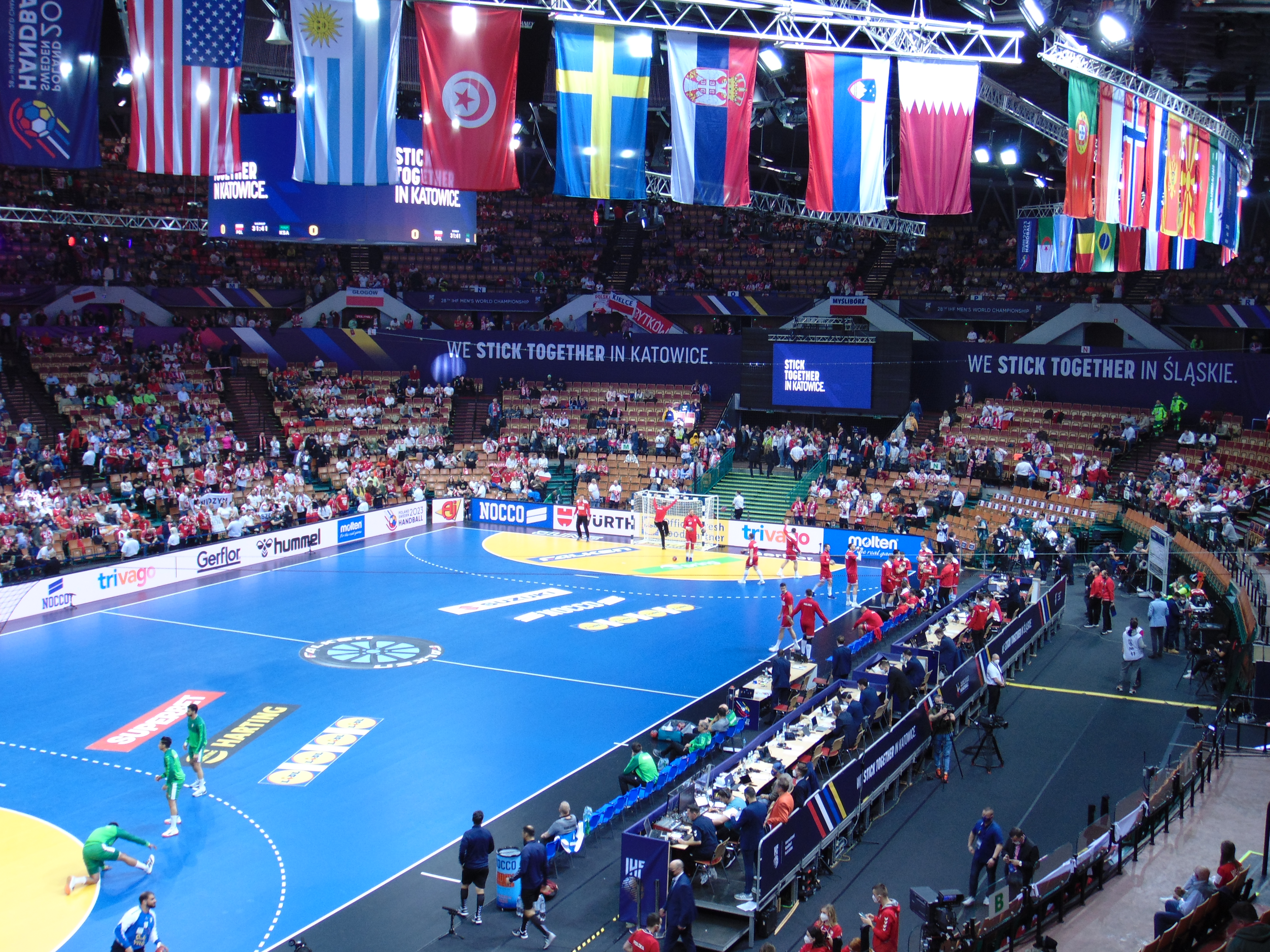
Match Poland-Saudi Arabia in Katowice

== Bidding process ==
Eight nations initially expressed interest in hosting the tournament:

- France
- Hungary
- Norway
- Poland
- Slovakia
- South Korea
- Sweden
- Switzerland

However until the bidding phase expired on 15 April 2015 only three nations entered documents to bid for this event. On 21 April 2015 it was announced that Poland and Sweden had agreed intentions to jointly hosting this tournament:

- Hungary
- Poland and Sweden

A decision was scheduled for 4 June 2015, but the Congress was moved to 6 November 2015. Poland and Sweden were chosen as the hosts. This is the first time Poland participate as the host country at a IHF World Men's Handball Championship.

== Venues ==
The tournament took place in nine cities (four in Poland and five in Sweden): Kraków, Gdańsk, Katowice, Płock, Stockholm, Malmö, Gothenburg, Jönköping and Kristianstad. The opening game took place in Katowice while the final took place in Stockholm.

Kraków	Gdańsk	Stockholm	Malmö	Gothenburg
Tauron Arena	Ergo Arena	Tele2 Arena	Malmö Arena	Scandinavium
Capacity: 15,030	Capacity: 11,409	Capacity: 19,000	Capacity: 13,000	Capacity: 12,000
2023 World Men's Handball Championship is located in Poland		Sweden, in orange, and Poland, in green are separated by the Baltic Sea.	2023 World Men's Handball Championship is located in Southern Sweden	
Katowice	Płock	Jönköping	Kristianstad	
Spodek	Orlen Arena	Husqvarna Garden	Kristianstad Arena	
Capacity: 11,036	Capacity: 5,492	Capacity: 7,000	Capacity: 4,700	

== Marketing ==
The logo was unveiled on 23 August 2021. The logo was designed to be used on a dark blue background, but it may also stand alone. The logo synthetically presents a flying ball. It was inspired by a comet lighting up the sky. The symbol was intended to convey dynamism and expression. The trails form a hand which, in combination with a ball in the foreground, was crafted to suggest a characteristic and friendly graphic form. The logo's colors refer to the national colors of Poland and Sweden, the organizers of the Men's World Championship 2023. The skill and color was drafted to alludes to the cooperation of the event hosts and sticking together for the success of the Championship. The logo was designed by Polish design agency Studio Signature. The slogan: Stick Together was unveiled on 15 September 2021. The concept "Stick together" is the framework for all their communication and is the sender in all posts or other expressions coming from the 28th IHF Men's World Championship Poland/Sweden 2023. They use "Stick together" to talk about the big questions and the broader context, but they also use "Stick together" locally in all marketing in each host city. They wish to convey that the symbolism by each concept is as follows:

- Stick together for fair play.
- Stick together as fans.
- Stick together as a team.
- Stick together to challenge.
- Stick together in the arena.
- Stick together to win.

It is also as part of both countries sustainability and capable communication concepts.

== Qualification ==
The World Championship hosts qualified directly, along with the reigning world champions. Following the current IHF rules, the number of compulsory places awarded to each continental confederation is divided as follows: 4 places each for Africa, Asia and Europe. Because there is more than one organiser from the same Continental Confederation (Europe), the number of compulsory places of the respective Continental Confederation were reduced accordingly. So only 3 compulsory places for Europe, while Africa and Asia were kept with 4 four places allocated. Starting in 2021 Pan America was split into two zones: the North America and Caribbean zone having 1 place, and the South and Central America zone having 3 places. One additional place were available for Oceania, but only when that region's national team ranked fifth or higher at the Asian Championship. Since no Oceania team placed among the top five at the Asian Championship, the IHF awarded an additional wild card. In addition, several performance places were awarded for the continental confederations (12 places), which were based on the teams ranked 1–12 in the preceding World Championship. Taking into consideration the results of the 2021 Men's World Championship, 20 out of 32 places were distributed as follows:

Distribution of places (following current IHF rules)	Vacancies	Details	Comments
Organisers ^{1}	3		
Reigning world champion ^{2}	1		
Performance places for the continental confederations	12		Based on teams ranked 1-12 in the preceding world championship
Africa		1	Egypt ranked 7th in the 2021 Men's World Championship
Asia		1	Qatar ranked 8th in the 2021 Men's World Championship
Europe		9	9 European teams ranked 1-12 in the 2021 Men's World Championship
North America and the Caribbean		0	
South and Central America		1	Argentina ranked 11th in 2021 the Men's World Championship
Oceania		0	
Compulsory places for the continental confederations	16		17 compulsory places reduced by 1 due to having two organisers
Africa		4	
Asia		4	
Europe		3 ^{1}	4 compulsory places reduced by 1 due to having two organisers from Europe
North America and the Caribbean		1	
South and Central America		3	
Oceania		1 ^{3}	Place allocated to Oceania or an additional free wild card
Wild card ^{4}	1		
Total	32		

- ^{1}All hosting federations are automatically entitled to take part in the World Championship. If there is more than one organiser from the same continental confederation, the number of compulsory places of the respective confederation shall be reduced accordingly. If there is more than one organiser and the organisers are not from the same confederation, the IHF Council shall decide about the reduction of the compulsory places, considering only the compulsory places of the confederations involved.
- ^{2}The reigning world champion automatically qualifies for the next World Championship and, as a rule, is placed first in the first performance row. In case the reigning world champion is also hosting the next World Championship, the confederation of the reigning world champion obtains one additional performance place.
- ^{3}The compulsory place for Oceania is subject to fulfilling certain conditions. The continental confederation of Oceania does not have a direct compulsory place for a confederational qualification event. The confederation of Oceania is invited to participate in the Asian qualification events. The compulsory place is awarded to Oceania if the representative from Oceania is ranked 5th or higher in the Asian qualification. If Oceania fails to rank 5th or does not participate, the IHF Council will award this place as a free wild card.
- ^{4}The wild card shall be awarded by the IHF Council.

Competition	Dates	Host	Vacancies	Qualified
Host nations	6 November 2015	(Russia) Sochi	2	Poland; Sweden
2021 World Championship	13–31 January 2021	Egypt	1	Denmark
2022 European Men's Handball Championship	13–30 January 2022	Hungary; Slovakia	3	France; Norway; Spain
2022 Asian Men's Handball Championship	18–31 January 2022	(Saudi Arabia) Dammam	5	Bahrain; Iran; Qatar; Saudi Arabia; South Korea
2022 South and Central American Men's Handball Championship	25–29 January 2022	(Brazil) Recife	4	Argentina; Brazil; Chile; Uruguay
European qualification	7 November 2021 – 16 April 2022	Various	9	Belgium; Croatia; Germany; Hungary; Iceland; Montenegro; North Macedonia; Portugal; Serbia
2022 Nor.Ca. Men's Handball Championship	26–30 June 2022	Mexico City	1	United States
2022 African Men's Handball Championship	11–18 July 2022	Egypt	5	Algeria; Cape Verde; Egypt; Morocco; Tunisia
Wild card	28 June 2022	—	1+1	Netherlands; Slovenia

=== Qualified teams ===
Country	Qualified as	Qualified on	Previous appearances^{5, 6}
Poland	Co-host	6 November 2015	16 (1958, 1967, 1970, 1974, 1978, 1982, 1986, 1990, 2003, 2007, 2009, 2011, 2013, 2015, 2017, 2021)
Sweden	Co-host	6 November 2015	25 (1938, **1954**, **1958**, 1961, 1964, 1967, 1970, 1974, 1978, 1982, 1986, **1990**, 1993, 1995, 1997, **1999**, 2001, 2003, 2005, 2009, 2011, 2015, 2017, 2019, 2021)
Denmark	World champion	31 January 2021	24 (1938, 1954, 1958, 1961, 1964, 1967, 1970, 1974, 1978, 1982, 1986, 1993, 1995, 1999, 2003, 2005, 2007, 2009, 2011, 2013, 2015, 2017, **2019**, **2021**)
Bahrain	Top five at the 2022 Asian Championship	24 January 2022	4 (2011, 2017, 2019, 2021)
Iran	Top five at the 2022 Asian Championship	24 January 2022	1 (2015)
Qatar	Top five at the 2022 Asian Championship	24 January 2022	8 (2003, 2005, 2007, 2013, 2015, 2017, 2019, 2021)
Spain	Top three at 2022 European Championship	25 January 2022	21 (1958, 1974, 1978, 1982, 1986, 1990, 1993, 1995, 1997, 1999, 2001, 2003, **2005**, 2007, 2009, 2011, **2013**, 2015, 2017, 2019, 2021)
Saudi Arabia	Top five at the 2022 Asian Championship	26 January 2022	9 (1997, 1999, 2001, 2003, 2009, 2013, 2015, 2017, 2019)
Argentina	Top four at 2022 South and Central American Championship	26 January 2022	13 (1997, 1999, 2001, 2003, 2005, 2007, 2009, 2011, 2013, 2015, 2017, 2019, 2021)
Uruguay	Top four at 2022 South and Central American Championship	26 January 2022	1 (2021)
France	Top three at 2022 European Championship	26 January 2022	23 (1954, 1958, 1961, 1964, 1967, 1970, 1978, 1990, 1993, **1995**, 1997, 1999, **2001**, 2003, 2005, 2007, **2009**, **2011**, 2013, **2015**, **2017**, 2019, 2021)
Brazil	Top four at 2022 South and Central American Championship	26 January 2022	15 (1958, 1995, 1997, 1999, 2001, 2003, 2005, 2007, 2009, 2011, 2013, 2015, 2017, 2019, 2021)
Chile	Top four at 2022 South and Central American Championship	26 January 2022	6 (2011, 2013, 2015, 2017, 2019, 2021)
Norway	Top three at 2022 European Championship	28 January 2022	16 (1958, 1961, 1964, 1967, 1970, 1993, 1997, 1999, 2001, 2005, 2007, 2009, 2011, 2017, 2019, 2021)
South Korea	Top five at the 2022 Asian Championship	30 January 2022	13 (1986, 1990, 1993, 1995, 1997, 1999, 2001, 2007, 2009, 2011, 2013, 2019, 2021)
Belgium	European playoffs	19 March 2022	0 (debut)
Hungary	European playoffs	16 April 2022	21 (1958, 1964, 1967, 1970, 1974, 1978, 1982, 1986, 1990, 1993, 1995, 1997, 1999, 2003, 2007, 2009, 2011, 2013, 2017, 2019, 2021)
Croatia	European playoffs	16 April 2022	14 (1995, 1997, 1999, 2001, **2003**, 2005, 2007, 2009, 2011, 2013, 2015, 2017, 2019, 2021)
Iceland	European playoffs	16 April 2022	21 (1958, 1961, 1964, 1970, 1974, 1978, 1986, 1990, 1993, 1995, 1997, 2001, 2003, 2005, 2007, 2011, 2013, 2015, 2017, 2019, 2021)
Serbia	European playoffs	16 April 2022	4 ( 2009, 2011, 2013, 2019)
Germany	European playoffs	16 April 2022	26 (**1938**, 1954, 1958, 1961, 1964, 1967, 1970, 1974, **1978**, 1982, 1986, 1990^{7}, 1993, 1995, 1999, 2001, 2003, 2005, **2007**, 2009, 2011, 2013, 2015, 2017, 2019, 2021)
Portugal	European playoffs	17 April 2022	4 (1997, 2001, 2003, 2021)
Montenegro	European playoffs	17 April 2022	1 (2013)
North Macedonia	European playoffs	17 April 2022	7 (1999, 2009, 2013, 2015, 2017, 2019, 2021)
Netherlands	Wild card	28 June 2022	1 (1961)
Slovenia	Wild card	28 June 2022	9 (1995, 2001, 2003, 2005, 2007, 2013, 2015, 2017, 2021)
United States	Winner of the 2022 Nor.Ca. Championship	30 June 2022	6 (1964, 1970, 1974, 1993, 1995, 2001)
Morocco	Top five at 2022 African Men's Handball Championship	15 July 2022	7 (1995, 1997, 1999, 2001, 2003, 2007, 2021)
Tunisia	Top five at 2022 African Men's Handball Championship	15 July 2022	15 (1967, 1995, 1997, 1999, 2001, 2003, 2005, 2007, 2009, 2011, 2013, 2015, 2017, 2019, 2021)
Cape Verde	Top five at 2022 African Men's Handball Championship	15 July 2022	1 (2021)
Egypt	Top five at 2022 African Men's Handball Championship	15 July 2022	16 (1964, 1993, 1995, 1997, 1999, 2001, 2003, 2005, 2007, 2009, 2011, 2013, 2015, 2017, 2019, 2021)
Algeria	Top five at 2022 African Men's Handball Championship	18 July 2022	15 (1974, 1982, 1986, 1990, 1995, 1997, 1999, 2001, 2003, 2005, 2009, 2011, 2013, 2015, 2021)

^{5} Bold indicates champion for that year
^{6} Italic indicates host country for that year
^{7} From both German teams only East Germany was qualified in 1990

== Draw ==
The draw took place on 2 July 2022 at the Polish National Radio Symphony Orchestra in Katowice.

=== Seeding ===
Following ranking of previous World Championship, and following IHF rules.

Pot 1	Pot 2	Pot 3	Pot 4
Hold Title (DEN as Europe 3); Europe 1 (Host SWE); Europe 2 Europe 4 Europe 5 Europe 6 Europe 7 Africa 1	Asia 1 Europe 8 Europe 9 South America 1 Europe 10; Host (POL as Europe 12); Europe 11; Europe 13	Europe 14; Europe 15; South America 2 Asia 2 Asia 3 Africa 2 South America 3 Africa 3	South America 4 Africa 4 Africa 5 Asia 4 Asia 5 North America 1 Wild card 1 Wild card 2

Pot 1	Pot 2	Pot 3	Pot 4
Denmark (Hold); Sweden (Host); Spain; France; Norway; Iceland; Germany; Egypt	Qatar; Croatia; Belgium; Brazil; Portugal; Poland (Host); Montenegro; North Macedonia	Serbia; Hungary; Argentina; Bahrain; Saudi Arabia; Cape Verde; Chile; Morocco	Uruguay; Tunisia; Algeria; Iran; South Korea; United States; Netherlands; Slovenia

=== Groups ===
Each host country could assign one qualified team to each host city. Therefore Spain played in group A (Krakow), Norway in group F (Krakow), and Denmark in group H (Malmö). Germany in group E (Katowice), Iceland in group D (Kristianstad) and Croatia in group G (Jönköping).

Group A (Krakow)	Group B (Katowice)	Group C (Göteborg)	Group D (Kristianstad)	Group E (Katowice)	Group F (Krakow)	Group G (Jönköping)	Group H (Malmö)
Spain; Montenegro; Chile; Iran	France; Poland (Host); Saudi Arabia; Slovenia	Sweden (Host); Brazil; Cape Verde; Uruguay	Iceland; Portugal; Hungary; South Korea	Germany; Qatar; Serbia; Algeria	Norway; North Macedonia; Argentina; Netherlands	Egypt; Croatia; Morocco; United States	Denmark; Belgium; Bahrain; Tunisia

== Referees ==
The referee pairs were selected on 16 November 2022.

Referees
Algeria	Youcef Belkhiri; Sid Ali Hamidi
Argentina	Julian Grillo; Sebastián Lenci
Argentina	María Paolantoni; Mariana García
Bosnia and Herzegovina	Amar Konjičanin; Dino Konjičanin
Croatia	Matija Gubica; Boris Milošević
Czech Republic	Václav Horáček; Jiří Novotný
Denmark	Mads Hansen; Jesper Madsen
Egypt	Alaa Emam; Hossam Hedaia
France	Charlotte Bonaventura; Julie Bonaventura

Referees
France	Karim Gasmi; Raouf Gasmi
Germany	Robert Schulze; Tobias Tönnies
Germany	Maike Merz; Tanja Kuttler
Hungary	Ádám Bíró; Olivér Kiss
Lithuania	Mindaugas Gatelis; Vaidas Mažeika
North Macedonia	Gjorgji Nachevski; Slave Nikolov
Montenegro	Ivan Pavićević; Miloš Ražnatović
Norway	Håvard Kleven; Lars Jørum

Referees
Portugal	Duarte Santos; Ricardo Fonseca
Serbia	Marko Sekulić; Vladimir Jovandić
Slovenia	Bojan Lah; David Sok
South Korea	Koo Bon-ok; Lee Se-ok
Spain	Ignacio García; Andreu Marín
Sweden	Mirza Kurtagic; Mattias Wetterwik
Switzerland	Arthur Brunner; Morad Salah
Turkey	Kürşad Erdoğan; Ibrahim Özdeniz

== Preliminary round ==
All times are local (UTC+1).

=== Group A ===
Pos	Team	Pld	W	D	L	GF	GA	GD	Pts	Qualification
1	Spain	3	3	0	0	99	73	+26	6	Main round Group I
2	Montenegro	3	2	0	1	94	94	0	4	Main round Group I
3	Iran	3	1	0	2	78	93	−15	2	Main round Group I
4	Chile	3	0	0	3	83	94	−11	0	President's Cup Group I

Source: IHF
Rules for classification: 1) points; 2) head-to-head points; 3) head-to-head goal difference; 4) head-to-head number of goals scored; 5) goal difference.

12 January 2023; 18:00	Chile	24–25	Iran	Tauron Arena, Kraków; Attendance: 1,007; Referees: A. Konjičanin, D. Konjičanin (BIH)
12 January 2023; 18:00	Er. Feuchtmann 6	(11–13)	Oraei 7	Tauron Arena, Kraków; Attendance: 1,007; Referees: A. Konjičanin, D. Konjičanin (BIH)
12 January 2023; 18:00	2× (suspension)	Report	2× (yellow card) 8× (suspension) 1× (red card)	Tauron Arena, Kraków; Attendance: 1,007; Referees: A. Konjičanin, D. Konjičanin (BIH)

12 January 2023; 20:30	Spain	30–25	Montenegro	Tauron Arena, Kraków; Attendance: 1,808; Referees: Brunner, Salah (SUI)
12 January 2023; 20:30	Odriozola 6	(15–12)	B. Vujović 7	Tauron Arena, Kraków; Attendance: 1,808; Referees: Brunner, Salah (SUI)
12 January 2023; 20:30	4× (suspension)	Report	6× (suspension)	Tauron Arena, Kraków; Attendance: 1,808; Referees: Brunner, Salah (SUI)

14 January 2023; 18:00	Montenegro	34–31	Iran	Tauron Arena, Kraków; Attendance: 2,600; Referees: Fonseca, Santos (POR)
14 January 2023; 18:00	M. Vujović 10	(19–16)	Oraei, Sadeghi 7	Tauron Arena, Kraków; Attendance: 2,600; Referees: Fonseca, Santos (POR)
14 January 2023; 18:00	2× (suspension)	Report	1× (yellow card) 4× (suspension)	Tauron Arena, Kraków; Attendance: 2,600; Referees: Fonseca, Santos (POR)

14 January 2023; 20:30	Spain	34–26	Chile	Tauron Arena, Kraków; Attendance: 3,150; Referees: Emam, Hedaia (EGY)
14 January 2023; 20:30	A. Dujshebaev 6	(18–15)	Er. Feuchtmann 8	Tauron Arena, Kraków; Attendance: 3,150; Referees: Emam, Hedaia (EGY)
14 January 2023; 20:30	3× (suspension)	Report	3× (yellow card) 4× (suspension)	Tauron Arena, Kraków; Attendance: 3,150; Referees: Emam, Hedaia (EGY)

16 January 2023; 18:00	Montenegro	35–33	Chile	Tauron Arena, Kraków; Attendance: 1,100; Referees: Özdeniz, Erdoğan (TUR)
16 January 2023; 18:00	M. Vujović 12	(20–18)	Er. Feuchtmann 9	Tauron Arena, Kraków; Attendance: 1,100; Referees: Özdeniz, Erdoğan (TUR)
16 January 2023; 18:00	2× (yellow card) 6× (suspension) 1× (red card)	Report	1× (yellow card) 1× (suspension)	Tauron Arena, Kraków; Attendance: 1,100; Referees: Özdeniz, Erdoğan (TUR)

16 January 2023; 20:30	Iran	22–35	Spain	Tauron Arena, Kraków; Attendance: 1,403; Referees: Koo, Lee (KOR)
16 January 2023; 20:30	three players 4	(11–21)	A. Dujshebaev, Solé 6	Tauron Arena, Kraków; Attendance: 1,403; Referees: Koo, Lee (KOR)
16 January 2023; 20:30	1× (yellow card) 4× (suspension)	Report	2× (suspension)	Tauron Arena, Kraków; Attendance: 1,403; Referees: Koo, Lee (KOR)

=== Group B ===
Pos	Team	Pld	W	D	L	GF	GA	GD	Pts	Qualification
1	France	3	3	0	0	102	78	+24	6	Main round Group I
2	Slovenia	3	2	0	1	96	77	+19	4	Main round Group I
3	Poland (H)	3	1	0	2	74	82	−8	2	Main round Group I
4	Saudi Arabia	3	0	0	3	66	101	−35	0	President's Cup Group I

Source: IHF
Rules for classification: 1) points; 2) head-to-head points; 3) head-to-head goal difference; 4) head-to-head number of goals scored; 5) goal difference.
(H) Hosts

11 January 2023; 21:00	France	26–24	Poland	Spodek, Katowice; Attendance: 9,999; Referees: Kurtagic, Wetterwik (SWE)
11 January 2023; 21:00	Mahé 5	(14–13)	Sićko 7	Spodek, Katowice; Attendance: 9,999; Referees: Kurtagic, Wetterwik (SWE)
11 January 2023; 21:00	1× (yellow card) 4× (suspension)	Report	1× (yellow card) 2× (suspension)	Spodek, Katowice; Attendance: 9,999; Referees: Kurtagic, Wetterwik (SWE)

12 January 2023; 18:00	Saudi Arabia	19–33	Slovenia	Spodek, Katowice; Attendance: 1,371; Referees: Erdoğan, Özdeniz (TUR)
12 January 2023; 18:00	Al-Muwallad 4	(8–16)	Janc 6	Spodek, Katowice; Attendance: 1,371; Referees: Erdoğan, Özdeniz (TUR)
12 January 2023; 18:00	4× (suspension) 1× (red card)	Report	4× (suspension)	Spodek, Katowice; Attendance: 1,371; Referees: Erdoğan, Özdeniz (TUR)

14 January 2023; 18:00	France	41–23	Saudi Arabia	Spodek, Katowice; Attendance: 6,200; Referees: Koo, Lee (KOR)
14 January 2023; 18:00	Lenne 8	(24–14)	Al-Abbas, Ma. Al-Salem 5	Spodek, Katowice; Attendance: 6,200; Referees: Koo, Lee (KOR)
14 January 2023; 18:00	1× (suspension)	Report	1× (yellow card) 3× (suspension) 1× (red card)	Spodek, Katowice; Attendance: 6,200; Referees: Koo, Lee (KOR)

14 January 2023; 20:30	Poland	23–32	Slovenia	Spodek, Katowice; Attendance: 9,999; Referees: Horáček, Novotný (CZE)
14 January 2023; 20:30	Moryto 6	(11–17)	Dolenec 7	Spodek, Katowice; Attendance: 9,999; Referees: Horáček, Novotný (CZE)
14 January 2023; 20:30	5× (suspension)	Report	6× (suspension)	Spodek, Katowice; Attendance: 9,999; Referees: Horáček, Novotný (CZE)

16 January 2023; 18:00	Slovenia	31–35	France	Spodek, Katowice; Attendance: 6,400; Referees: Brunner, Salah (SUI)
16 January 2023; 18:00	Vlah 9	(14–16)	Mahé, Remili 7	Spodek, Katowice; Attendance: 6,400; Referees: Brunner, Salah (SUI)
16 January 2023; 18:00	1× (yellow card) 3× (suspension)	Report	6× (suspension)	Spodek, Katowice; Attendance: 6,400; Referees: Brunner, Salah (SUI)

16 January 2023; 20:30	Poland	27–24	Saudi Arabia	Spodek, Katowice; Attendance: 9,999; Referees: Santos, Fonseca (POR)
16 January 2023; 20:30	Moryto 9	(13–12)	Al-Abbas 5	Spodek, Katowice; Attendance: 9,999; Referees: Santos, Fonseca (POR)
16 January 2023; 20:30	7× (suspension)	Report	1× (yellow card) 1× (suspension)	Spodek, Katowice; Attendance: 9,999; Referees: Santos, Fonseca (POR)

=== Group C ===
Pos	Team	Pld	W	D	L	GF	GA	GD	Pts	Qualification
1	Sweden (H)	3	3	0	0	107	57	+50	6	Main round Group II
2	Brazil	3	2	0	1	83	78	+5	4	Main round Group II
3	Cape Verde	3	1	0	2	88	89	−1	2	Main round Group II
4	Uruguay	3	0	0	3	61	115	−54	0	President's Cup Group I

Source: IHF
Rules for classification: 1) points; 2) head-to-head points; 3) head-to-head goal difference; 4) head-to-head number of goals scored; 5) goal difference.
(H) Hosts

12 January 2023; 18:00	Cape Verde	33–25	Uruguay	Scandinavium, Gothenburg; Attendance: 6,312; Referees: Merz, Kuttler (GER)
12 January 2023; 18:00	G. Furtado 6	(17–11)	Rostagno, Rubbo 5	Scandinavium, Gothenburg; Attendance: 6,312; Referees: Merz, Kuttler (GER)
12 January 2023; 18:00	2× (suspension)	Report	1× (suspension)	Scandinavium, Gothenburg; Attendance: 6,312; Referees: Merz, Kuttler (GER)

12 January 2023; 20:30	Sweden	26–18	Brazil	Scandinavium, Gothenburg; Attendance: 11,627; Referees: Lah, Sok (SLO)
12 January 2023; 20:30	Gottfridsson 6	(11–9)	Rodrigues 4	Scandinavium, Gothenburg; Attendance: 11,627; Referees: Lah, Sok (SLO)
12 January 2023; 20:30	3× (suspension)	Report	2× (yellow card) 4× (suspension)	Scandinavium, Gothenburg; Attendance: 11,627; Referees: Lah, Sok (SLO)

14 January 2023; 18:00	Brazil	35–24	Uruguay	Scandinavium, Gothenburg; Attendance: 7,697; Referees: Sekulić, Jovandić (SRB)
14 January 2023; 18:00	Hackbarth 7	(19–10)	Capello 5	Scandinavium, Gothenburg; Attendance: 7,697; Referees: Sekulić, Jovandić (SRB)
14 January 2023; 18:00	1× (yellow card) 4× (suspension)	Report	1× (yellow card) 1× (suspension)	Scandinavium, Gothenburg; Attendance: 7,697; Referees: Sekulić, Jovandić (SRB)

14 January 2023; 20:30	Sweden	34–27	Cape Verde	Scandinavium, Gothenburg; Attendance: 11,750; Referees: K. Gasmi, R. Gasmi (FRA)
14 January 2023; 20:30	D. Pettersson, Wanne 5	(19–8)	F. Landim, Moreno 6	Scandinavium, Gothenburg; Attendance: 11,750; Referees: K. Gasmi, R. Gasmi (FRA)
14 January 2023; 20:30	1× (suspension)	Report	5× (suspension)	Scandinavium, Gothenburg; Attendance: 11,750; Referees: K. Gasmi, R. Gasmi (FRA)

16 January 2023; 18:00	Brazil	30–28	Cape Verde	Scandinavium, Gothenburg; Attendance: 5,191; Referees: Kleven, Jørum (NOR)
16 January 2023; 18:00	Dupoux 7	(17–15)	Moreno 7	Scandinavium, Gothenburg; Attendance: 5,191; Referees: Kleven, Jørum (NOR)
16 January 2023; 18:00	2× (suspension)	Report	4× (suspension)	Scandinavium, Gothenburg; Attendance: 5,191; Referees: Kleven, Jørum (NOR)

16 January 2023; 20:30	Uruguay	12–47	Sweden	Scandinavium, Gothenburg; Attendance: 9,051; Referees: Belkhiri, Hamidi (ALG)
16 January 2023; 20:30	De Agrela 5	(8–25)	Johansson 11	Scandinavium, Gothenburg; Attendance: 9,051; Referees: Belkhiri, Hamidi (ALG)
16 January 2023; 20:30	3× (suspension)	Report	3× (suspension)	Scandinavium, Gothenburg; Attendance: 9,051; Referees: Belkhiri, Hamidi (ALG)

=== Group D ===
Pos	Team	Pld	W	D	L	GF	GA	GD	Pts	Qualification
1	Portugal	3	2	0	1	85	74	+11	4 (Note: Portugal 2 Pts, +3 GD, Iceland 2 Pts, +2 GD, Hungary 2 Pts, −5 GD)	Main round Group II
2	Iceland	3	2	0	1	96	81	+15	4	Main round Group II
3	Hungary	3	2	0	1	85	82	+3	4	Main round Group II
4	South Korea	3	0	0	3	76	105	−29	0	President's Cup Group I

Source: IHF
Rules for classification: 1) points; 2) head-to-head points; 3) head-to-head goal difference; 4) head-to-head number of goals scored; 5) goal difference.
Notes:

12 January 2023; 18:00	Hungary	35–27	South Korea	Kristianstad Arena, Kristianstad; Attendance: 2,738; Referees: Belkhiri, Hamidi (ALG)
12 January 2023; 18:00	Lékai 7	(21–11)	three players 5	Kristianstad Arena, Kristianstad; Attendance: 2,738; Referees: Belkhiri, Hamidi (ALG)
12 January 2023; 18:00	1× (yellow card) 8× (suspension) 1× (red card)	Report	2× (yellow card) 3× (suspension)	Kristianstad Arena, Kristianstad; Attendance: 2,738; Referees: Belkhiri, Hamidi (ALG)

12 January 2023; 20:30	Iceland	30–26	Portugal	Kristianstad Arena, Kristianstad; Attendance: 2,738; Referees: Schulze, Tönnies (GER)
12 January 2023; 20:30	Elísson 9	(15–15)	Portela 8	Kristianstad Arena, Kristianstad; Attendance: 2,738; Referees: Schulze, Tönnies (GER)
12 January 2023; 20:30	1× (yellow card) 3× (suspension)	Report	1× (yellow card) 5× (suspension) 1× (red card)	Kristianstad Arena, Kristianstad; Attendance: 2,738; Referees: Schulze, Tönnies (GER)

14 January 2023; 18:00	Portugal	32–24	South Korea	Kristianstad Arena, Kristianstad; Attendance: 4,615; Referees: Pavićević, Ražnatović (MNE)
14 January 2023; 18:00	Gomes 7	(15–12)	Lee H. 4	Kristianstad Arena, Kristianstad; Attendance: 4,615; Referees: Pavićević, Ražnatović (MNE)
14 January 2023; 18:00	5× (suspension)	Report	3× (suspension)	Kristianstad Arena, Kristianstad; Attendance: 4,615; Referees: Pavićević, Ražnatović (MNE)

14 January 2023; 20:30	Iceland	28–30	Hungary	Kristianstad Arena, Kristianstad; Attendance: 4,615; Referees: C. Bonaventura, J. Bonaventura (FRA)
14 January 2023; 20:30	Elísson 9	(17–12)	Ancsin 6	Kristianstad Arena, Kristianstad; Attendance: 4,615; Referees: C. Bonaventura, J. Bonaventura (FRA)
14 January 2023; 20:30	3× (suspension)	Report	1× (yellow card) 5× (suspension)	Kristianstad Arena, Kristianstad; Attendance: 4,615; Referees: C. Bonaventura, J. Bonaventura (FRA)

16 January 2023; 18:00	South Korea	25–38	Iceland	Kristianstad Arena, Kristianstad; Attendance: 3,608; Referees: Merz, Kuttler (GER)
16 January 2023; 18:00	Kang, Kim Y. 4	(13–19)	Ríkharðsson 11	Kristianstad Arena, Kristianstad; Attendance: 3,608; Referees: Merz, Kuttler (GER)
16 January 2023; 18:00	4× (suspension)	Report	1× (yellow card) 4× (suspension)	Kristianstad Arena, Kristianstad; Attendance: 3,608; Referees: Merz, Kuttler (GER)

16 January 2023; 20:30	Portugal	27–20	Hungary	Kristianstad Arena, Kristianstad; Attendance: 3,608; Referees: Nachevski, Nikolov (MKD)
16 January 2023; 20:30	F. Costa 6	(16–9)	Bodó 5	Kristianstad Arena, Kristianstad; Attendance: 3,608; Referees: Nachevski, Nikolov (MKD)
16 January 2023; 20:30	1× (yellow card) 2× (suspension)	Report	3× (suspension) 1× (red card)	Kristianstad Arena, Kristianstad; Attendance: 3,608; Referees: Nachevski, Nikolov (MKD)

=== Group E ===
Pos	Team	Pld	W	D	L	GF	GA	GD	Pts	Qualification
1	Germany	3	3	0	0	102	81	+21	6	Main round Group III
2	Serbia	3	2	0	1	103	85	+18	4	Main round Group III
3	Qatar	3	1	0	2	80	89	−9	2	Main round Group III
4	Algeria	3	0	0	3	72	102	−30	0	President's Cup Group II

Source: IHF
Rules for classification: 1) points; 2) head-to-head points; 3) head-to-head goal difference; 4) head-to-head number of goals scored; 5) goal difference.

13 January 2023; 18:00	Germany	31–27	Qatar	Spodek, Katowice; Attendance: 3,500; Referees: Milošević, Gubica (CRO)
13 January 2023; 18:00	Knorr 8	(18–13)	Capote 5	Spodek, Katowice; Attendance: 3,500; Referees: Milošević, Gubica (CRO)
13 January 2023; 18:00	1× (yellow card) 1× (suspension)	Report	1× (yellow card) 4× (suspension)	Spodek, Katowice; Attendance: 3,500; Referees: Milošević, Gubica (CRO)

13 January 2023; 20:30	Serbia	36–27	Algeria	Spodek, Katowice; Attendance: 3,500; Referees: Gatelis, Mažeika (LTU)
13 January 2023; 20:30	Marsenić 9	(16–13)	Arib 5	Spodek, Katowice; Attendance: 3,500; Referees: Gatelis, Mažeika (LTU)
13 January 2023; 20:30	4× (suspension)	Report	1× (yellow card) 4× (suspension)	Spodek, Katowice; Attendance: 3,500; Referees: Gatelis, Mažeika (LTU)

15 January 2023; 18:00	Germany	34–33	Serbia	Spodek, Katowice; Attendance: 4,600; Referees: Hansen, Madsen (DEN)
15 January 2023; 18:00	Mertens 7	(19–17)	Kukić 7	Spodek, Katowice; Attendance: 4,600; Referees: Hansen, Madsen (DEN)
15 January 2023; 18:00	1× (yellow card) 5× (suspension)	Report	1× (yellow card) 2× (suspension)	Spodek, Katowice; Attendance: 4,600; Referees: Hansen, Madsen (DEN)

15 January 2023; 20:30	Qatar	29–24	Algeria	Spodek, Katowice; Attendance: 3,200; Referees: Emam, Hedaia (EGY)
15 January 2023; 20:30	Gačević, Madadi 7	(12–11)	Abdi, Daoud 5	Spodek, Katowice; Attendance: 3,200; Referees: Emam, Hedaia (EGY)
15 January 2023; 20:30	2× (yellow card) 4× (suspension)	Report	3× (suspension)	Spodek, Katowice; Attendance: 3,200; Referees: Emam, Hedaia (EGY)

17 January 2023; 18:00	Algeria	21–37	Germany	Spodek, Katowice; Attendance: 2,350; Referees: Kiss, Bíró (HUN)
17 January 2023; 18:00	Abdi 5	(9–16)	Kohlbacher 10	Spodek, Katowice; Attendance: 2,350; Referees: Kiss, Bíró (HUN)
17 January 2023; 18:00	1× (yellow card) 2× (suspension) 1× (red card)	Report	1× (suspension)	Spodek, Katowice; Attendance: 2,350; Referees: Kiss, Bíró (HUN)

17 January 2023; 20:30	Qatar	24–34	Serbia	Spodek, Katowice; Attendance: 1,800; Referees: Horáček, Novotný (CZE)
17 January 2023; 20:30	three players 5	(14–17)	Radivojević 7	Spodek, Katowice; Attendance: 1,800; Referees: Horáček, Novotný (CZE)
17 January 2023; 20:30	3× (suspension)	Report	4× (suspension) 2× (red card)	Spodek, Katowice; Attendance: 1,800; Referees: Horáček, Novotný (CZE)

=== Group F ===
Pos	Team	Pld	W	D	L	GF	GA	GD	Pts	Qualification
1	Norway	3	3	0	0	98	74	+24	6	Main round Group III
2	Netherlands	3	2	0	1	89	70	+19	4	Main round Group III
3	Argentina	3	1	0	2	75	87	−12	2	Main round Group III
4	North Macedonia	3	0	0	3	77	108	−31	0	President's Cup Group II

Source: IHF
Rules for classification: 1) points; 2) head-to-head points; 3) head-to-head goal difference; 4) head-to-head number of goals scored; 5) goal difference.

13 January 2023; 18:00	Argentina	19–29	Netherlands	Tauron Arena, Kraków; Attendance: 2,418; Referees: Madsen, Hansen (DEN)
13 January 2023; 18:00	Parker, D. Simonet 5	(11–14)	Smits 7	Tauron Arena, Kraków; Attendance: 2,418; Referees: Madsen, Hansen (DEN)
13 January 2023; 18:00	1× (yellow card) 3× (suspension)	Report	1× (yellow card) 3× (suspension)	Tauron Arena, Kraków; Attendance: 2,418; Referees: Madsen, Hansen (DEN)

13 January 2023; 20:30	Norway	39–27	North Macedonia	Tauron Arena, Kraków; Attendance: 4,048; Referees: Bíró, Kiss (HUN)
13 January 2023; 20:30	Abelvik Rød, Sagosen 6	(18–11)	Taleski 7	Tauron Arena, Kraków; Attendance: 4,048; Referees: Bíró, Kiss (HUN)
13 January 2023; 20:30	1× (yellow card) 2× (suspension)	Report	1× (yellow card) 3× (suspension)	Tauron Arena, Kraków; Attendance: 4,048; Referees: Bíró, Kiss (HUN)

15 January 2023; 18:00	North Macedonia	24–34	Netherlands	Tauron Arena, Kraków; Attendance: 3,300; Referees: Kurtagic, Wetterwik (SWE)
15 January 2023; 18:00	Kuzmanovski, Peševski 4	(11–18)	Smits 10	Tauron Arena, Kraków; Attendance: 3,300; Referees: Kurtagic, Wetterwik (SWE)
15 January 2023; 18:00	2× (yellow card) 2× (suspension)	Report	1× (yellow card) 5× (suspension)	Tauron Arena, Kraków; Attendance: 3,300; Referees: Kurtagic, Wetterwik (SWE)

15 January 2023; 20:30	Norway	32–21	Argentina	Tauron Arena, Kraków; Attendance: 3,750; Referees: A. Konjičanin, D. Konjičanin (BIH)
15 January 2023; 20:30	three players 5	(16–12)	D. Simonet 7	Tauron Arena, Kraków; Attendance: 3,750; Referees: A. Konjičanin, D. Konjičanin (BIH)
15 January 2023; 20:30	2× (suspension)	Report	5× (suspension)	Tauron Arena, Kraków; Attendance: 3,750; Referees: A. Konjičanin, D. Konjičanin (BIH)

17 January 2023; 18:00	North Macedonia	26–35	Argentina	Tauron Arena, Kraków; Attendance: 2,214; Referees: Mažeika, Gatelis (LTU)
17 January 2023; 18:00	Taleski 5	(11–18)	D. Simonet 8	Tauron Arena, Kraków; Attendance: 2,214; Referees: Mažeika, Gatelis (LTU)
17 January 2023; 18:00	1× (yellow card) 1× (suspension)	Report	1× (yellow card) 2× (suspension)	Tauron Arena, Kraków; Attendance: 2,214; Referees: Mažeika, Gatelis (LTU)

17 January 2023; 20:30	Netherlands	26–27	Norway	Tauron Arena, Kraków; Attendance: 2,750; Referees: Gubica, Milošević (CRO)
17 January 2023; 20:30	Smits 7	(17–13)	Sagosen 7	Tauron Arena, Kraków; Attendance: 2,750; Referees: Gubica, Milošević (CRO)
17 January 2023; 20:30	1× (yellow card) 3× (suspension)	Report		Tauron Arena, Kraków; Attendance: 2,750; Referees: Gubica, Milošević (CRO)

=== Group G ===
Pos	Team	Pld	W	D	L	GF	GA	GD	Pts	Qualification
1	Egypt	3	3	0	0	96	57	+39	6	Main round Group IV
2	Croatia	3	2	0	1	98	77	+21	4	Main round Group IV
3	United States	3	1	0	2	66	102	−36	2	Main round Group IV
4	Morocco	3	0	0	3	70	94	−24	0	President's Cup Group II

Source: IHF
Rules for classification: 1) points; 2) head-to-head points; 3) head-to-head goal difference; 4) head-to-head number of goals scored; 5) goal difference.

13 January 2023; 18:00	Morocco	27–28	United States	Husqvarna Garden, Jönköping; Attendance: 4,817; Referees: Kleven, Jørum (NOR)
13 January 2023; 18:00	Harchaoui 5	(12–12)	Fofana 6	Husqvarna Garden, Jönköping; Attendance: 4,817; Referees: Kleven, Jørum (NOR)
13 January 2023; 18:00	5× (suspension) 1× (red card)	Report	5× (suspension) 1×	Husqvarna Garden, Jönköping; Attendance: 4,817; Referees: Kleven, Jørum (NOR)

13 January 2023; 20:30	Egypt	31–22	Croatia	Husqvarna Garden, Jönköping; Attendance: 5,200; Referees: García, Marín (ESP)
13 January 2023; 20:30	Mahmoud 7	(16–12)	Šipić 5	Husqvarna Garden, Jönköping; Attendance: 5,200; Referees: García, Marín (ESP)
13 January 2023; 20:30	2× (suspension)	Report	2× (yellow card) 5× (suspension)	Husqvarna Garden, Jönköping; Attendance: 5,200; Referees: García, Marín (ESP)

15 January 2023; 18:00	Egypt	30–19	Morocco	Husqvarna Garden, Jönköping; Attendance: 3,304; Referees: Grillo, Lenci (ARG)
15 January 2023; 18:00	Kaddah 7	(13–9)	Lakbi 5	Husqvarna Garden, Jönköping; Attendance: 3,304; Referees: Grillo, Lenci (ARG)
15 January 2023; 18:00	1× (yellow card) 1× (suspension)	Report	1× (yellow card) 4× (suspension)	Husqvarna Garden, Jönköping; Attendance: 3,304; Referees: Grillo, Lenci (ARG)

15 January 2023; 20:30	Croatia	40–22	United States	Husqvarna Garden, Jönköping; Attendance: 3,423; Referees: Paolantoni, García (ARG)
15 January 2023; 20:30	Karačić 8	(20–10)	Hines 6	Husqvarna Garden, Jönköping; Attendance: 3,423; Referees: Paolantoni, García (ARG)
15 January 2023; 20:30	1× (yellow card) 2× (suspension)	Report	3× (suspension)	Husqvarna Garden, Jönköping; Attendance: 3,423; Referees: Paolantoni, García (ARG)

17 January 2023; 18:00	United States	16–35	Egypt	Husqvarna Garden, Jönköping; Attendance: 2,603; Referees: Sekulić, Jovandić (SRB)
17 January 2023; 18:00	Amitović, Chan 4	(7–19)	four players 4	Husqvarna Garden, Jönköping; Attendance: 2,603; Referees: Sekulić, Jovandić (SRB)
17 January 2023; 18:00	1× (yellow card) 2× (suspension)	Report	2× (suspension)	Husqvarna Garden, Jönköping; Attendance: 2,603; Referees: Sekulić, Jovandić (SRB)

17 January 2023; 20:30	Croatia	36–24	Morocco	Husqvarna Garden, Jönköping; Attendance: 2,617; Referees: C. Bonaventura, J. Bonaventura (FRA)
17 January 2023; 20:30	Cindrić 9	(15–13)	El Hakimy, Rezzouki 5	Husqvarna Garden, Jönköping; Attendance: 2,617; Referees: C. Bonaventura, J. Bonaventura (FRA)
17 January 2023; 20:30	1× (yellow card) 4× (suspension)	Report	4× (suspension)	Husqvarna Garden, Jönköping; Attendance: 2,617; Referees: C. Bonaventura, J. Bonaventura (FRA)

=== Group H ===
Pos	Team	Pld	W	D	L	GF	GA	GD	Pts	Qualification
1	Denmark	3	3	0	0	113	70	+43	6	Main round Group IV
2	Bahrain	3	1	1	1	78	91	−13	3	Main round Group IV
3	Belgium	3	1	0	2	87	102	−15	2	Main round Group IV
4	Tunisia	3	0	1	2	77	92	−15	1	President's Cup Group II

Source: IHF
Rules for classification: 1) points; 2) head-to-head points; 3) head-to-head goal difference; 4) head-to-head number of goals scored; 5) goal difference.

13 January 2023; 18:00	Bahrain	27–27	Tunisia	Malmö Arena, Malmö; Attendance: 8,870; Referees: Nachevski, Nikolov (MKD)
13 January 2023; 18:00	Jalal 10	(16–15)	Rzig 8	Malmö Arena, Malmö; Attendance: 8,870; Referees: Nachevski, Nikolov (MKD)
13 January 2023; 18:00	1× (yellow card) 2× (suspension)	Report	1× (yellow card) 3× (suspension)	Malmö Arena, Malmö; Attendance: 8,870; Referees: Nachevski, Nikolov (MKD)

13 January 2023; 20:30	Denmark	43–28	Belgium	Malmö Arena, Malmö; Attendance: 12,426; Referees: Paolantoni, García (ARG)
13 January 2023; 20:30	M. Hansen 10	(22–15)	Brixhe 5	Malmö Arena, Malmö; Attendance: 12,426; Referees: Paolantoni, García (ARG)
13 January 2023; 20:30	1× (yellow card) 2× (suspension)	Report	5× (suspension)	Malmö Arena, Malmö; Attendance: 12,426; Referees: Paolantoni, García (ARG)

15 January 2023; 18:00	Belgium	31–29	Tunisia	Malmö Arena, Malmö; Attendance: 1,023; Referees: García, Marín (ESP)
15 January 2023; 18:00	Qerimi 6	(17–16)	Maoua 4	Malmö Arena, Malmö; Attendance: 1,023; Referees: García, Marín (ESP)
15 January 2023; 18:00	6× (suspension)	Report	2× (yellow card) 2× (suspension) 1× (red card)	Malmö Arena, Malmö; Attendance: 1,023; Referees: García, Marín (ESP)

15 January 2023; 20:30	Denmark	36–21	Bahrain	Malmö Arena, Malmö; Attendance: 10,566; Referees: Schulze, Tönnies (GER)
15 January 2023; 20:30	Gidsel 9	(16–9)	A. Merza 5	Malmö Arena, Malmö; Attendance: 10,566; Referees: Schulze, Tönnies (GER)
15 January 2023; 20:30		Report	2× (suspension)	Malmö Arena, Malmö; Attendance: 10,566; Referees: Schulze, Tönnies (GER)

17 January 2023; 18:00	Belgium	28–30	Bahrain	Malmö Arena, Malmö; Attendance: 9,350; Referees: Grillo, Lenci (ARG)
17 January 2023; 18:00	Kotters 8	(12–15)	A. Merza 6	Malmö Arena, Malmö; Attendance: 9,350; Referees: Grillo, Lenci (ARG)
17 January 2023; 18:00	3× (suspension) 1× (red card)	Report	5× (suspension)	Malmö Arena, Malmö; Attendance: 9,350; Referees: Grillo, Lenci (ARG)

17 January 2023; 20:30	Tunisia	21–34	Denmark	Malmö Arena, Malmö; Attendance: 10,143; Referees: Pavićević, Ražnatović (MNE)
17 January 2023; 20:30	Darmoul 6	(14–19)	Gidsel 8	Malmö Arena, Malmö; Attendance: 10,143; Referees: Pavićević, Ražnatović (MNE)
17 January 2023; 20:30	1× (yellow card) 3× (suspension)	Report	2× (suspension)	Malmö Arena, Malmö; Attendance: 10,143; Referees: Pavićević, Ražnatović (MNE)

== President's Cup ==
=== Group I ===
Pos	Team	Pld	W	D	L	GF	GA	GD	Pts	Qualification
1	Chile	3	3	0	0	93	73	+20	6	25th place game
2	South Korea	3	2	0	1	97	86	+11	4	27th place game
3	Saudi Arabia	3	1	0	2	74	87	−13	2	29th place game
4	Uruguay	3	0	0	3	81	99	−18	0	31st place game

Source: IHF
Rules for classification: 1) points; 2) head-to-head points; 3) head-to-head goal difference; 4) head-to-head number of goals scored; 5) goal difference.

18 January 2023; 15:30	Chile	26–23	Saudi Arabia	Orlen Arena, Płock; Attendance: 600; Referees: Özdeniz, Erdoğan (TUR)
18 January 2023; 15:30	Er. Feuchtmann 8	(12–13)	Al-Abdulali 7	Orlen Arena, Płock; Attendance: 600; Referees: Özdeniz, Erdoğan (TUR)
18 January 2023; 15:30	1× (yellow card) 3× (suspension)	Report	2× (yellow card) 3× (suspension) 1× (red card)	Orlen Arena, Płock; Attendance: 600; Referees: Özdeniz, Erdoğan (TUR)

18 January 2023; 18:00	Uruguay	30–37	South Korea	Orlen Arena, Płock; Attendance: 800; Referees: Emam, Hedaia (EGY)
18 January 2023; 18:00	Rubbo 8	(15–23)	Ha T., Jin 6	Orlen Arena, Płock; Attendance: 800; Referees: Emam, Hedaia (EGY)
18 January 2023; 18:00	1× (yellow card) 4× (suspension)	Report	2× (yellow card) 4× (suspension) 1× (red card)	Orlen Arena, Płock; Attendance: 800; Referees: Emam, Hedaia (EGY)

20 January 2023; 15:30	Chile	34–24	Uruguay	Orlen Arena, Płock; Attendance: 600; Referees: García, Paolantoni (ARG)
20 January 2023; 15:30	Er. Feuchtmann 6	(17–13)	De Agrela, Rubbo 4	Orlen Arena, Płock; Attendance: 600; Referees: García, Paolantoni (ARG)
20 January 2023; 15:30	1× (yellow card) 3× (suspension) 1× (red card)	Report	1× (yellow card) 5× (suspension)	Orlen Arena, Płock; Attendance: 600; Referees: García, Paolantoni (ARG)

20 January 2023; 18:00	Saudi Arabia	23–34	South Korea	Orlen Arena, Płock; Attendance: 1,200; Referees: Santos, Fonseca (POR)
20 January 2023; 18:00	Al-Abbas, Al-Hassan 4	(12–17)	Jang 11	Orlen Arena, Płock; Attendance: 1,200; Referees: Santos, Fonseca (POR)
20 January 2023; 18:00	1× (yellow card) 7× (suspension) 1× (red card)	Report	8× (suspension)	Orlen Arena, Płock; Attendance: 1,200; Referees: Santos, Fonseca (POR)

22 January 2023; 13:00	South Korea	26–33	Chile	Orlen Arena, Płock; Attendance: 650; Referees: Merz, Kuttler (GER)
22 January 2023; 13:00	Kang 6	(16–16)	Er. Feuchtmann 9	Orlen Arena, Płock; Attendance: 650; Referees: Merz, Kuttler (GER)
22 January 2023; 13:00	2× (yellow card) 4× (suspension) 1×	Report	6× (suspension)	Orlen Arena, Płock; Attendance: 650; Referees: Merz, Kuttler (GER)

22 January 2023; 15:30	Saudi Arabia	28–27	Uruguay	Orlen Arena, Płock; Attendance: 1,250; Referees: Emam, Hedaia (EGY)
22 January 2023; 15:30	Ma. Al-Salem 8	(15–14)	Rubbo 11	Orlen Arena, Płock; Attendance: 1,250; Referees: Emam, Hedaia (EGY)
22 January 2023; 15:30	1× (yellow card) 3× (suspension)	Report	1× (yellow card) 5× (suspension)	Orlen Arena, Płock; Attendance: 1,250; Referees: Emam, Hedaia (EGY)

=== Group II ===
Pos	Team	Pld	W	D	L	GF	GA	GD	Pts	Qualification
1	Tunisia	3	3	0	0	93	78	+15	6	25th place game
2	North Macedonia	3	2	0	1	108	83	+25	4	27th place game
3	Morocco	3	1	0	2	78	97	−19	2	29th place game
4	Algeria	3	0	0	3	77	98	−21	0	31st place game

Source: IHF
Rules for classification: 1) points; 2) head-to-head points; 3) head-to-head goal difference; 4) head-to-head number of goals scored; 5) goal difference.

19 January 2023; 15:30	Algeria	25–40	North Macedonia	Orlen Arena, Płock; Attendance: 600; Referees: Koo, Lee (KOR)
19 January 2023; 15:30	Daoud 5	(11–19)	Manaskov, Peševski 7	Orlen Arena, Płock; Attendance: 600; Referees: Koo, Lee (KOR)
19 January 2023; 15:30	4× (suspension) 1× (red card)	Report	2× (suspension)	Orlen Arena, Płock; Attendance: 600; Referees: Koo, Lee (KOR)

19 January 2023; 18:00	Morocco	25–30	Tunisia	Orlen Arena, Płock; Attendance: 800; Referees: Santos, Fonseca (POR)
19 January 2023; 18:00	Rezzouki 9	(13–13)	Rzig 8	Orlen Arena, Płock; Attendance: 800; Referees: Santos, Fonseca (POR)
19 January 2023; 18:00	1× (yellow card) 6× (suspension)	Report	6× (suspension)	Orlen Arena, Płock; Attendance: 800; Referees: Santos, Fonseca (POR)

21 January 2023; 15:30	Algeria	27–28	Morocco	Orlen Arena, Płock; Attendance: 900; Referees: Erdoğan, Özdeniz (TUR)
21 January 2023; 15:30	Abdi 7	(15–13)	Harchaoui 5	Orlen Arena, Płock; Attendance: 900; Referees: Erdoğan, Özdeniz (TUR)
21 January 2023; 15:30	1× (yellow card) 4× (suspension)	Report	3× (yellow card) 4× (suspension)	Orlen Arena, Płock; Attendance: 900; Referees: Erdoğan, Özdeniz (TUR)

21 January 2023; 18:00	North Macedonia	28–33	Tunisia	Orlen Arena, Płock; Attendance: 1,300; Referees: Paolantoni, García (ARG)
21 January 2023; 18:00	Kuzmanovski 8	(14–16)	Darmoul 7	Orlen Arena, Płock; Attendance: 1,300; Referees: Paolantoni, García (ARG)
21 January 2023; 18:00	1× (yellow card) 7× (suspension)	Report	3× (yellow card) 9× (suspension) 1× (red card)	Orlen Arena, Płock; Attendance: 1,300; Referees: Paolantoni, García (ARG)

23 January 2023; 15:30	Tunisia	30–25	Algeria	Orlen Arena, Płock; Attendance: 800; Referees: Grillo, Lenci (ARG)
23 January 2023; 15:30	Boughanmi 8	(15–12)	Abdi 8	Orlen Arena, Płock; Attendance: 800; Referees: Grillo, Lenci (ARG)
23 January 2023; 15:30	1× (yellow card) 2× (suspension)	Report	2× (suspension)	Orlen Arena, Płock; Attendance: 800; Referees: Grillo, Lenci (ARG)

23 January 2023; 18:00	North Macedonia	40–25	Morocco	Orlen Arena, Płock; Attendance: 1,050; Referees: Koo, Lee (KOR)
23 January 2023; 18:00	Kuzmanovski 8	(18–12)	Zaher 8	Orlen Arena, Płock; Attendance: 1,050; Referees: Koo, Lee (KOR)
23 January 2023; 18:00	3× (suspension)	Report	1× (suspension)	Orlen Arena, Płock; Attendance: 1,050; Referees: Koo, Lee (KOR)

=== 31st place game ===
25 January 2023; 13:00	Uruguay	33–34	Algeria	Orlen Arena, Płock; Attendance: 1,050; Referees: Lee, Koo (KOR)
25 January 2023; 13:00	Chaparro, Rubbo 6	(17–16)	Arib, Yacine 6	Orlen Arena, Płock; Attendance: 1,050; Referees: Lee, Koo (KOR)
25 January 2023; 13:00	2× (suspension)	Report	4× (suspension)	Orlen Arena, Płock; Attendance: 1,050; Referees: Lee, Koo (KOR)

=== 29th place game ===
25 January 2023; 15:30	Saudi Arabia	32–30	Morocco	Orlen Arena, Płock; Attendance: 1,050; Referees: Merz, Kuttler (GER)
25 January 2023; 15:30	Moj. Al-Salem 7	(18–11)	Harchaoui 10	Orlen Arena, Płock; Attendance: 1,050; Referees: Merz, Kuttler (GER)
25 January 2023; 15:30	1× (yellow card) 5× (suspension)	Report	1× (yellow card) 2× (suspension)	Orlen Arena, Płock; Attendance: 1,050; Referees: Merz, Kuttler (GER)

=== 27th place game ===
25 January 2023; 18:00	South Korea	33–36	North Macedonia	Orlen Arena, Płock; Attendance: 1,400; Referees: Grillo, Lenci (ARG)
25 January 2023; 18:00	Jin 8	(19–20)	Kuzmanovski 8	Orlen Arena, Płock; Attendance: 1,400; Referees: Grillo, Lenci (ARG)
25 January 2023; 18:00	1× (yellow card) 3× (suspension) 1× (red card)	Report	2× (yellow card) 5× (suspension)	Orlen Arena, Płock; Attendance: 1,400; Referees: Grillo, Lenci (ARG)

=== 25th place game ===
25 January 2023; 20:30	Chile	26–38	Tunisia	Orlen Arena, Płock; Attendance: 2,000; Referees: Sekulić, Jovandić (SRB)
25 January 2023; 20:30	Er. Feuchtmann 8	(10–24)	Toumi 8	Orlen Arena, Płock; Attendance: 2,000; Referees: Sekulić, Jovandić (SRB)
25 January 2023; 20:30	2× (suspension)	Report	4× (suspension) 2× (red card)	Orlen Arena, Płock; Attendance: 2,000; Referees: Sekulić, Jovandić (SRB)

== Main round ==
=== Group I ===
Results between advancing teams from Group A and Group B were carried over.

Pos	Team	Pld	W	D	L	GF	GA	GD	Pts	Qualification
1	France	5	5	0	0	165	134	+31	10	Quarterfinals
2	Spain	5	4	0	1	149	124	+25	8	Quarterfinals
3	Slovenia	5	3	0	2	158	133	+25	6	
4	Poland (H)	5	2	0	3	123	127	−4	4	
5	Montenegro	5	1	0	4	126	154	−28	2	
6	Iran	5	0	0	5	125	174	−49	0	

Source: IHF
Rules for classification: 1) points; 2) head-to-head points; 3) head-to-head goal difference; 4) head-to-head number of goals scored; 5) goal difference.
(H) Hosts

18 January 2023; 15:30	Iran	21–38	Slovenia	Tauron Arena, Kraków; Attendance: 1,206; Referees: Bíró, Kiss (HUN)
18 January 2023; 15:30	Oraei, Sadeghzadeh 4	(9–20)	Makuc 6	Tauron Arena, Kraków; Attendance: 1,206; Referees: Bíró, Kiss (HUN)
18 January 2023; 15:30	3× (suspension)	Report	5× (suspension)	Tauron Arena, Kraków; Attendance: 1,206; Referees: Bíró, Kiss (HUN)

18 January 2023; 18:00	France	35–24	Montenegro	Tauron Arena, Kraków; Attendance: 2,411; Referees: Kurtagic, Wetterwik (SWE)
18 January 2023; 18:00	Richardson 10	(16–13)	Božović 6	Tauron Arena, Kraków; Attendance: 2,411; Referees: Kurtagic, Wetterwik (SWE)
18 January 2023; 18:00	1× (yellow card) 3× (suspension)	Report	1× (yellow card) 4× (suspension)	Tauron Arena, Kraków; Attendance: 2,411; Referees: Kurtagic, Wetterwik (SWE)

18 January 2023; 20:30	Spain	27–23	Poland	Tauron Arena, Kraków; Attendance: 7,030; Referees: Hansen, Madsen (DEN)
18 January 2023; 20:30	three players 4	(16–15)	Sićko 7	Tauron Arena, Kraków; Attendance: 7,030; Referees: Hansen, Madsen (DEN)
18 January 2023; 20:30	1× (yellow card) 3× (suspension)	Report	1× (yellow card) 2× (suspension) 1× (red card)	Tauron Arena, Kraków; Attendance: 7,030; Referees: Hansen, Madsen (DEN)

20 January 2023; 15:30	Slovenia	26–31	Spain	Tauron Arena, Kraków; Attendance: 2,100; Referees: Kurtagic, Wetterwik (SWE)
20 January 2023; 15:30	Dolenec 7	(15–15)	Odriozola 6	Tauron Arena, Kraków; Attendance: 2,100; Referees: Kurtagic, Wetterwik (SWE)
20 January 2023; 15:30	2× (yellow card) 4× (suspension)	Report	3× (suspension)	Tauron Arena, Kraków; Attendance: 2,100; Referees: Kurtagic, Wetterwik (SWE)

20 January 2023; 18:00	Iran	29–41	France	Tauron Arena, Kraków; Attendance: 4,150; Referees: Gubica, Milošević (CRO)
20 January 2023; 18:00	three players 4	(14–18)	Briet, Tournat 6	Tauron Arena, Kraków; Attendance: 4,150; Referees: Gubica, Milošević (CRO)
20 January 2023; 18:00	7× (suspension)	Report	1× (suspension)	Tauron Arena, Kraków; Attendance: 4,150; Referees: Gubica, Milošević (CRO)

20 January 2023; 20:30	Montenegro	20–27	Poland	Tauron Arena, Kraków; Attendance: 9,087; Referees: Brunner, Salah (SUI)
20 January 2023; 20:30	M. Vujović 6	(8–11)	Jędraszczyk 6	Tauron Arena, Kraków; Attendance: 9,087; Referees: Brunner, Salah (SUI)
20 January 2023; 20:30	3× (suspension)	Report	3× (suspension) 1× (red card)	Tauron Arena, Kraków; Attendance: 9,087; Referees: Brunner, Salah (SUI)

22 January 2023; 15:30	Montenegro	23–31	Slovenia	Tauron Arena, Kraków; Attendance: 3,200; Referees: Gubica, Milošević (CRO)
22 January 2023; 15:30	Vujačić 5	(8–15)	Vlah 6	Tauron Arena, Kraków; Attendance: 3,200; Referees: Gubica, Milošević (CRO)
22 January 2023; 15:30	2× (suspension)	Report	5× (suspension)	Tauron Arena, Kraków; Attendance: 3,200; Referees: Gubica, Milošević (CRO)

22 January 2023; 18:00	Iran	22–26	Poland	Tauron Arena, Kraków; Attendance: 11,221; Referees: Gatelis, Mažeika (LTU)
22 January 2023; 18:00	Oraei, Sadeghi 6	(10–16)	Pietrasik 6	Tauron Arena, Kraków; Attendance: 11,221; Referees: Gatelis, Mažeika (LTU)
22 January 2023; 18:00	1× (yellow card) 4× (suspension)	Report	1× (yellow card) 2× (suspension)	Tauron Arena, Kraków; Attendance: 11,221; Referees: Gatelis, Mažeika (LTU)

22 January 2023; 21:00	Spain	26–28	France	Tauron Arena, Kraków; Attendance: 7,000; Referees: Nachevski, Nikolov (MKD)
22 January 2023; 21:00	Fernández 7	(13–13)	four players 4	Tauron Arena, Kraków; Attendance: 7,000; Referees: Nachevski, Nikolov (MKD)
22 January 2023; 21:00	5× (suspension)	Report	3× (suspension)	Tauron Arena, Kraków; Attendance: 7,000; Referees: Nachevski, Nikolov (MKD)

=== Group II ===
Results between advancing teams from Group C and Group D were carried over.

Pos	Team	Pld	W	D	L	GF	GA	GD	Pts	Qualification
1	Sweden (H)	5	5	0	0	164	133	+31	10	Quarterfinals
2	Hungary	5	3	0	2	148	147	+1	6 (Note: Iceland 28–30 Hungary)	Quarterfinals
3	Iceland	5	3	0	2	169	158	+11	6	
4	Portugal	5	2	1	2	146	133	+13	5	
5	Brazil	5	1	1	3	138	151	−13	3	
6	Cape Verde	5	0	0	5	138	181	−43	0	

Source: IHF
Rules for classification: 1) points; 2) head-to-head points; 3) head-to-head goal difference; 4) head-to-head number of goals scored; 5) goal difference.
(H) Hosts
Notes:

18 January 2023; 15:30	Portugal	28–28	Brazil	Scandinavium, Gothenburg; Attendance: 2,301; Referees: C. Bonaventura, J. Bonaventura (FRA)
18 January 2023; 15:30	Areia 7	(12–11)	Dupoux 10	Scandinavium, Gothenburg; Attendance: 2,301; Referees: C. Bonaventura, J. Bonaventura (FRA)
18 January 2023; 15:30	1× (suspension) 1× (red card)	Report	3× (suspension)	Scandinavium, Gothenburg; Attendance: 2,301; Referees: C. Bonaventura, J. Bonaventura (FRA)

18 January 2023; 18:00	Cape Verde	30–40	Iceland	Scandinavium, Gothenburg; Attendance: 5,723; Referees: Belkhiri, Hamidi (ALG)
18 January 2023; 18:00	D. Pina 11	(13–18)	Guðjónsson 6	Scandinavium, Gothenburg; Attendance: 5,723; Referees: Belkhiri, Hamidi (ALG)
18 January 2023; 18:00	4× (suspension)	Report	1× (yellow card) 3× (suspension)	Scandinavium, Gothenburg; Attendance: 5,723; Referees: Belkhiri, Hamidi (ALG)

18 January 2023; 20:30	Sweden	37–28	Hungary	Scandinavium, Gothenburg; Attendance: 9,256; Referees: Schulze, Tönnies (GER)
18 January 2023; 20:30	Wanne 9	(18–14)	Rosta 7	Scandinavium, Gothenburg; Attendance: 9,256; Referees: Schulze, Tönnies (GER)
18 January 2023; 20:30	2× (suspension)	Report	1× (yellow card) 3× (suspension)	Scandinavium, Gothenburg; Attendance: 9,256; Referees: Schulze, Tönnies (GER)

20 January 2023; 15:30	Cape Verde	23–35	Portugal	Scandinavium, Gothenburg; Attendance: 3,110; Referees: Merz, Kuttler (GER)
20 January 2023; 15:30	D. Pina 6	(12–14)	Areia 9	Scandinavium, Gothenburg; Attendance: 3,110; Referees: Merz, Kuttler (GER)
20 January 2023; 15:30	9× (suspension) 1× (red card)	Report	2× (suspension)	Scandinavium, Gothenburg; Attendance: 3,110; Referees: Merz, Kuttler (GER)

20 January 2023; 18:00	Brazil	25–28	Hungary	Scandinavium, Gothenburg; Attendance: 7,317; Referees: Pavićević, Ražnatović (MNE)
20 January 2023; 18:00	Monta da Silva 6	(14–14)	Lékai 7	Scandinavium, Gothenburg; Attendance: 7,317; Referees: Pavićević, Ražnatović (MNE)
20 January 2023; 18:00	1× (yellow card) 3× (suspension)	Report	1× (yellow card) 6× (suspension) 1× (red card)	Scandinavium, Gothenburg; Attendance: 7,317; Referees: Pavićević, Ražnatović (MNE)

20 January 2023; 20:30	Iceland	30–35	Sweden	Scandinavium, Gothenburg; Attendance: 11,801; Referees: Nachevski, Nikolov (MKD)
20 January 2023; 20:30	Elísson 8	(16–17)	Pellas 8	Scandinavium, Gothenburg; Attendance: 11,801; Referees: Nachevski, Nikolov (MKD)
20 January 2023; 20:30	1× (yellow card) 4× (suspension)	Report	1× (yellow card) 5× (suspension)	Scandinavium, Gothenburg; Attendance: 11,801; Referees: Nachevski, Nikolov (MKD)

22 January 2023; 15:30	Cape Verde	30–42	Hungary	Scandinavium, Gothenburg; Attendance: 3,899; Referees: Sekulić, Jovandić (SRB)
22 January 2023; 15:30	B. Landim 8	(15–22)	three players 7	Scandinavium, Gothenburg; Attendance: 3,899; Referees: Sekulić, Jovandić (SRB)
22 January 2023; 15:30	4× (suspension)	Report	1× (suspension)	Scandinavium, Gothenburg; Attendance: 3,899; Referees: Sekulić, Jovandić (SRB)

22 January 2023; 18:00	Brazil	37–41	Iceland	Scandinavium, Gothenburg; Attendance: 9,871; Referees: K. Gasmi, R. Gasmi (FRA)
22 January 2023; 18:00	Dupoux 8	(22–18)	Elísson 9	Scandinavium, Gothenburg; Attendance: 9,871; Referees: K. Gasmi, R. Gasmi (FRA)
22 January 2023; 18:00	1× (yellow card) 3× (suspension)	Report	1× (yellow card) 6× (suspension)	Scandinavium, Gothenburg; Attendance: 9,871; Referees: K. Gasmi, R. Gasmi (FRA)

22 January 2023; 20:30	Sweden	32–30	Portugal	Scandinavium, Gothenburg; Attendance: 11,670; Referees: C. Bonaventura, J. Bonaventura (FRA)
22 January 2023; 20:30	D. Pettersson 8	(13–14)	Areia 8	Scandinavium, Gothenburg; Attendance: 11,670; Referees: C. Bonaventura, J. Bonaventura (FRA)
22 January 2023; 20:30	1× (yellow card)	Report	2× (yellow card) 6× (suspension)	Scandinavium, Gothenburg; Attendance: 11,670; Referees: C. Bonaventura, J. Bonaventura (FRA)

=== Group III ===
Results between advancing teams from Group E and Group F were carried over.

Pos	Team	Pld	W	D	L	GF	GA	GD	Pts	Qualification
1	Norway	5	5	0	0	148	118	+30	10	Quarterfinals
2	Germany	5	4	0	1	163	133	+30	8	Quarterfinals
3	Serbia	5	3	0	2	155	141	+14	6	
4	Netherlands	5	2	0	3	143	141	+2	4	
5	Argentina	5	1	0	4	107	150	−43	2	
6	Qatar	5	0	0	5	120	153	−33	0	

Source: IHF
Rules for classification: 1) points; 2) head-to-head points; 3) head-to-head goal difference; 4) head-to-head number of goals scored; 5) goal difference.

19 January 2023; 15:30	Qatar	30–32	Netherlands	Spodek, Katowice; Attendance: 1,900; Referees: Gatelis, Mažeika (LTU)
19 January 2023; 15:30	Madadi 11	(19–15)	Smits, Ten Velde 8	Spodek, Katowice; Attendance: 1,900; Referees: Gatelis, Mažeika (LTU)
19 January 2023; 15:30	6× (suspension)	Report	1× (yellow card) 6× (suspension)	Spodek, Katowice; Attendance: 1,900; Referees: Gatelis, Mažeika (LTU)

19 January 2023; 18:00	Germany	39–19	Argentina	Spodek, Katowice; Attendance: 3,150; Referees: Horáček, Novotný (CZE)
19 January 2023; 18:00	three players 5	(24–11)	Martínez Cami 5	Spodek, Katowice; Attendance: 3,150; Referees: Horáček, Novotný (CZE)
19 January 2023; 18:00	3× (suspension)	Report	4× (suspension)	Spodek, Katowice; Attendance: 3,150; Referees: Horáček, Novotný (CZE)

19 January 2023; 20:30	Norway	31–28	Serbia	Spodek, Katowice; Attendance: 3,500; Referees: Brunner, Salah (SUI)
19 January 2023; 20:30	Barthold, Sagosen 5	(14–17)	three players 5	Spodek, Katowice; Attendance: 3,500; Referees: Brunner, Salah (SUI)
19 January 2023; 20:30	3× (suspension)	Report	1× (yellow card) 4× (suspension)	Spodek, Katowice; Attendance: 3,500; Referees: Brunner, Salah (SUI)

21 January 2023; 15:30	Serbia	28–22	Argentina	Spodek, Katowice; Attendance: 2,550; Referees: Belkhiri, Hamidi (ALG)
21 January 2023; 15:30	Radivojević 6	(12–10)	Lombardi 9	Spodek, Katowice; Attendance: 2,550; Referees: Belkhiri, Hamidi (ALG)
21 January 2023; 15:30	1× (yellow card) 5× (suspension)	Report	1× (yellow card) 4× (suspension)	Spodek, Katowice; Attendance: 2,550; Referees: Belkhiri, Hamidi (ALG)

21 January 2023; 18:00	Qatar	17–30	Norway	Spodek, Katowice; Attendance: 5,100; Referees: Bíró, Kiss (HUN)
21 January 2023; 18:00	Abdalla 5	(9–14)	Bjørnsen, Johannessen 6	Spodek, Katowice; Attendance: 5,100; Referees: Bíró, Kiss (HUN)
21 January 2023; 18:00	2× (suspension)	Report	1× (suspension)	Spodek, Katowice; Attendance: 5,100; Referees: Bíró, Kiss (HUN)

21 January 2023; 20:30	Netherlands	26–33	Germany	Spodek, Katowice; Attendance: 6,250; Referees: Madsen, Hansen (DEN)
21 January 2023; 20:30	Smits 6	(12–15)	Knorr 9	Spodek, Katowice; Attendance: 6,250; Referees: Madsen, Hansen (DEN)
21 January 2023; 20:30	1× (yellow card) 2× (suspension)	Report	1× (yellow card) 4× (suspension)	Spodek, Katowice; Attendance: 6,250; Referees: Madsen, Hansen (DEN)

23 January 2023; 15:30	Qatar	22–26	Argentina	Spodek, Katowice; Attendance: 1,850; Referees: Santos, Fonseca (POR)
23 January 2023; 15:30	Madadi 8	(9–12)	I. Pizarro 9	Spodek, Katowice; Attendance: 1,850; Referees: Santos, Fonseca (POR)
23 January 2023; 15:30	3× (suspension) 1× (red card)	Report	4× (suspension)	Spodek, Katowice; Attendance: 1,850; Referees: Santos, Fonseca (POR)

23 January 2023; 18:00	Serbia	32–30	Netherlands	Spodek, Katowice; Attendance: 3,100; Referees: Horáček, Novotný (CZE)
23 January 2023; 18:00	Milosavljević 9	(15–17)	Baijens 7	Spodek, Katowice; Attendance: 3,100; Referees: Horáček, Novotný (CZE)
23 January 2023; 18:00	4× (suspension) 1× (red card)	Report	9× (suspension) 1× (red card)	Spodek, Katowice; Attendance: 3,100; Referees: Horáček, Novotný (CZE)

23 January 2023; 20:30	Germany	26–28	Norway	Spodek, Katowice; Attendance: 4,100; Referees: Milošević, Gubica (CRO)
23 January 2023; 20:30	Knorr 8	(16–18)	Johannessen 5	Spodek, Katowice; Attendance: 4,100; Referees: Milošević, Gubica (CRO)
23 January 2023; 20:30	1× (yellow card) 1× (suspension) 1× (red card)	Report	1× (yellow card) 4× (suspension)	Spodek, Katowice; Attendance: 4,100; Referees: Milošević, Gubica (CRO)

=== Group IV ===
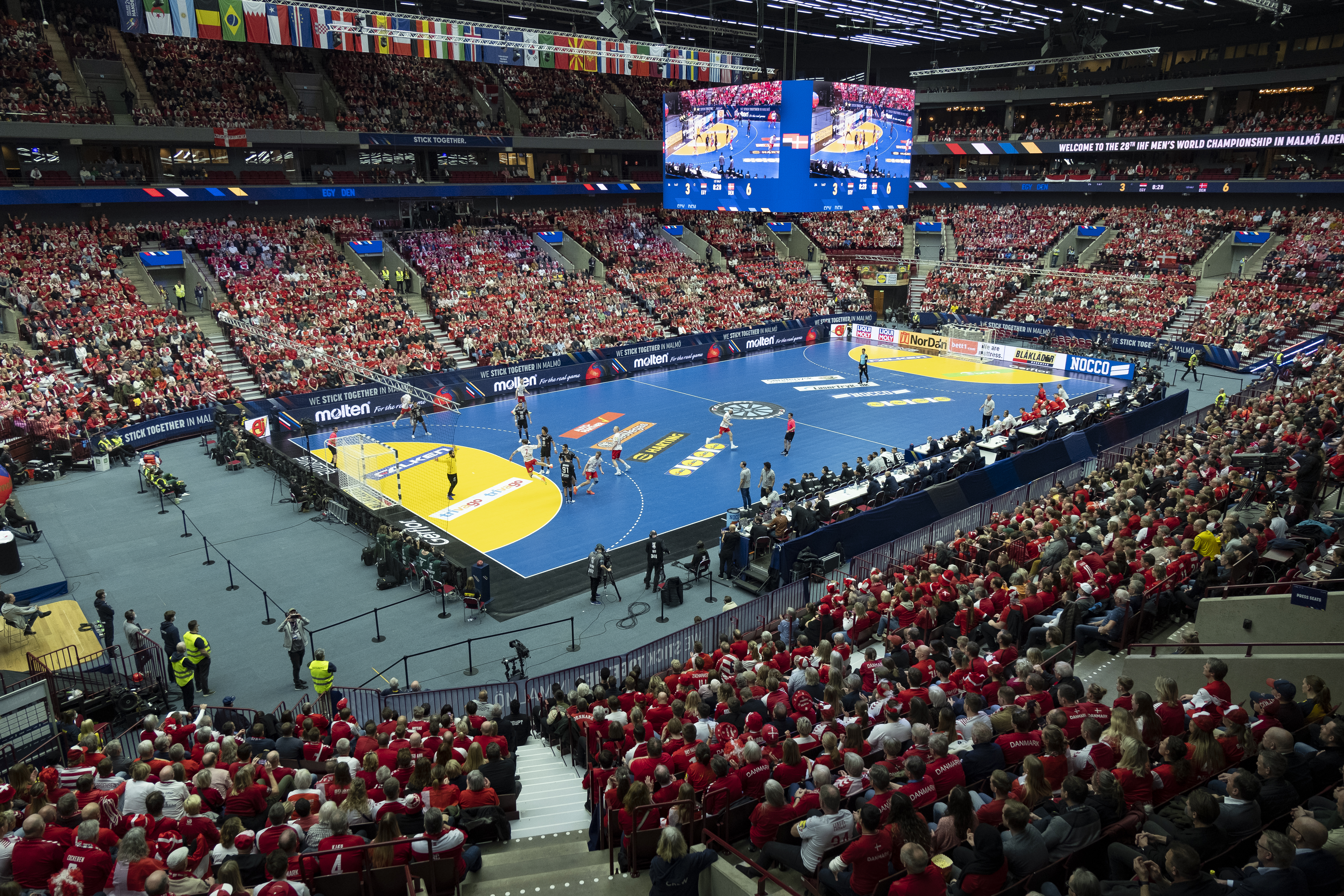
Denmark vs. Egypt (23 January)

Results between advancing teams from Group G and Group H were carried over.

Pos	Team	Pld	W	D	L	GF	GA	GD	Pts	Qualification
1	Denmark	5	4	1	0	174	130	+44	9	Quarterfinals
2	Egypt	5	4	0	1	150	118	+32	8	Quarterfinals
3	Croatia	5	3	1	1	171	143	+28	7	
4	Bahrain	5	2	0	3	137	160	−23	4	
5	United States	5	1	0	4	113	162	−49	2	
6	Belgium	5	0	0	5	132	164	−32	0	

Source: IHF
Rules for classification: 1) points; 2) head-to-head points; 3) head-to-head goal difference; 4) head-to-head number of goals scored; 5) goal difference.

19 January 2023; 15:30	United States	27–32	Bahrain	Malmö Arena, Malmö; Attendance: 1,891; Referees: K. Gasmi, R. Gasmi (FRA)
19 January 2023; 15:30	Hoddersen 6	(13–17)	Al-Sayyad 11	Malmö Arena, Malmö; Attendance: 1,891; Referees: K. Gasmi, R. Gasmi (FRA)
19 January 2023; 15:30	1× (yellow card) 3× (suspension) 1×	Report	4× (suspension)	Malmö Arena, Malmö; Attendance: 1,891; Referees: K. Gasmi, R. Gasmi (FRA)

19 January 2023; 18:00	Egypt	33–28	Belgium	Malmö Arena, Malmö; Attendance: 8,784; Referees: Lah, Sok (SLO)
19 January 2023; 18:00	Mahmoud 7	(22–15)	Danesi 9	Malmö Arena, Malmö; Attendance: 8,784; Referees: Lah, Sok (SLO)
19 January 2023; 18:00	3× (suspension)	Report	1× (yellow card) 4× (suspension)	Malmö Arena, Malmö; Attendance: 8,784; Referees: Lah, Sok (SLO)

19 January 2023; 20:30	Denmark	32–32	Croatia	Malmö Arena, Malmö; Attendance: 10,420; Referees: García, Marín (ESP)
19 January 2023; 20:30	Pytlick 9	(15–16)	Šipić 9	Malmö Arena, Malmö; Attendance: 10,420; Referees: García, Marín (ESP)
19 January 2023; 20:30	5× (suspension)	Report	2× (yellow card) 8× (suspension)	Malmö Arena, Malmö; Attendance: 10,420; Referees: García, Marín (ESP)

21 January 2023; 15:30	Bahrain	22–26	Egypt	Malmö Arena, Malmö; Attendance: 7,002; Referees: García, Marín (ESP)
21 January 2023; 15:30	A. Merza 6	(9–13)	Y. El-Deraa 5	Malmö Arena, Malmö; Attendance: 7,002; Referees: García, Marín (ESP)
21 January 2023; 15:30	2× (suspension)	Report	1× (yellow card) 1× (suspension)	Malmö Arena, Malmö; Attendance: 7,002; Referees: García, Marín (ESP)

21 January 2023; 18:00	Croatia	34–26	Belgium	Malmö Arena, Malmö; Attendance: 11,008; Referees: Kleven, Jørum (NOR)
21 January 2023; 18:00	Jelinić 6	(21–13)	three players 4	Malmö Arena, Malmö; Attendance: 11,008; Referees: Kleven, Jørum (NOR)
21 January 2023; 18:00	5× (suspension)	Report	3× (suspension)	Malmö Arena, Malmö; Attendance: 11,008; Referees: Kleven, Jørum (NOR)

21 January 2023; 20:30	United States	24–33	Denmark	Malmö Arena, Malmö; Attendance: 12,482; Referees: Grillo, Lenci (ARG)
21 January 2023; 20:30	Hoddersen 5	(10–18)	Jørgensen 8	Malmö Arena, Malmö; Attendance: 12,482; Referees: Grillo, Lenci (ARG)
21 January 2023; 20:30	4× (suspension)	Report	2× (yellow card) 2× (suspension)	Malmö Arena, Malmö; Attendance: 12,482; Referees: Grillo, Lenci (ARG)

23 January 2023; 15:30	United States	24–22	Belgium	Malmö Arena, Malmö; Attendance: 4,745; Referees: Schulze, Tönnies (GER)
23 January 2023; 15:30	four players 4	(14–12)	Kotters, Ooms 4	Malmö Arena, Malmö; Attendance: 4,745; Referees: Schulze, Tönnies (GER)
23 January 2023; 15:30	4× (suspension)	Report	1× (yellow card) 1× (suspension)	Malmö Arena, Malmö; Attendance: 4,745; Referees: Schulze, Tönnies (GER)

23 January 2023; 18:00	Croatia	43–32	Bahrain	Malmö Arena, Malmö; Attendance: 11,542; Referees: Kleven, Jørum (NOR)
23 January 2023; 18:00	Glavaš, Martinović 11	(17–16)	Qambar 7	Malmö Arena, Malmö; Attendance: 11,542; Referees: Kleven, Jørum (NOR)
23 January 2023; 18:00	1× (yellow card) 3× (suspension)	Report	4× (suspension)	Malmö Arena, Malmö; Attendance: 11,542; Referees: Kleven, Jørum (NOR)

23 January 2023; 20:30	Egypt	25–30	Denmark	Malmö Arena, Malmö; Attendance: 12,353; Referees: Sok, Lah (SLO)
23 January 2023; 20:30	Abdelhak 6	(12–17)	Gidsel, Pytlick 8	Malmö Arena, Malmö; Attendance: 12,353; Referees: Sok, Lah (SLO)
23 January 2023; 20:30	5× (suspension)	Report	1× (yellow card) 4× (suspension)	Malmö Arena, Malmö; Attendance: 12,353; Referees: Sok, Lah (SLO)

== Final round ==
=== Bracket ===
Quarter-finals
25 January
France	35
Germany	28
25 January
Sweden	26
Egypt	22
25 January
Norway	34
Spain (ET)	35
25 January
Denmark	40
Hungary	23

Semi-finals
27 January
France	31
Sweden	26
27 January
Spain	23
Denmark	26

Final
29 January
France	29
Denmark	34
Third place
29 January
Sweden	36
Spain	39

=== 5–8th place playoffs ===
5–8th place semifinals
27 January
Germany (ET)	35
Egypt	34
27 January
Norway	33
Hungary	25

Fifth place
29 January
Germany	28
Norway	24
Seventh place
29 January
Egypt (ET)	36
Hungary	35

=== Quarterfinals ===
25 January 2023; 18:00	Denmark	40–23	Hungary	Tele2 Arena, Stockholm; Attendance: 11,338; Referees: Brunner, Salah (SUI)
25 January 2023; 18:00	Gidsel 9	(21–12)	Bodó, Lékai 6	Tele2 Arena, Stockholm; Attendance: 11,338; Referees: Brunner, Salah (SUI)
25 January 2023; 18:00	3× (suspension)	Report	4× (suspension)	Tele2 Arena, Stockholm; Attendance: 11,338; Referees: Brunner, Salah (SUI)

25 January 2023
18:00
Norway
34–35 (ET)
Spain
Ergo Arena, Gdańsk
Attendance: 5,489
Referees: Lah, Sok (SLO)
Bjørnsen 9
(13–12)
Fernández Pérez 8
6× (suspension)
Report
1× (yellow card) 3× (suspension)

FT: 25–25 ET: 4–4, 5–6

25 January 2023; 20:30	Sweden	26–22	Egypt	Tele2 Arena, Stockholm; Attendance: 16,215; Referees: García, Marín (ESP)
25 January 2023; 20:30	Ekberg 6	(14–9)	Kaddah, Mahmoud 5	Tele2 Arena, Stockholm; Attendance: 16,215; Referees: García, Marín (ESP)
25 January 2023; 20:30	4× (suspension)	Report	1× (yellow card)	Tele2 Arena, Stockholm; Attendance: 16,215; Referees: García, Marín (ESP)

25 January 2023; 20:54 (Note: The match was scheduled for 20:30, but started about 24 minutes later because the first quarterfinal in Gdansk had gone into double extratime.)	France	35–28	Germany	Ergo Arena, Gdańsk; Attendance: 5,262; Referees: Hansen, Madsen (DEN)
25 January 2023; 20:54	Fabregas, Remili 5	(16–16)	Golla 6	Ergo Arena, Gdańsk; Attendance: 5,262; Referees: Hansen, Madsen (DEN)
25 January 2023; 20:54	3× (suspension)	Report	1× (suspension)	Ergo Arena, Gdańsk; Attendance: 5,262; Referees: Hansen, Madsen (DEN)

=== 5–8th place semifinals ===
27 January 2023
15:30
Germany
35–34 (ET)
Egypt
Tele2 Arena, Stockholm
Attendance: 3,604
Referees: Nachevski, Nikolov (MKD)
Knorr 7
(17–14)
Y. El-Deraa, Zein 7
1× (yellow card) 4× (suspension) 1× (red card)
Report
1× (suspension) 1× (red card)

FT: 30–30 ET: 5–4

27 January 2023; 18:00	Norway	33–25	Hungary	Tele2 Arena, Stockholm; Attendance: 9,081; Referees: C. Bonaventura, J. Bonaventura (FRA)
27 January 2023; 18:00	Sagosen 7	(16–13)	Lékai 6	Tele2 Arena, Stockholm; Attendance: 9,081; Referees: C. Bonaventura, J. Bonaventura (FRA)
27 January 2023; 18:00	2× (suspension)	Report	1× (yellow card) 2× (suspension) 1× (red card)	Tele2 Arena, Stockholm; Attendance: 9,081; Referees: C. Bonaventura, J. Bonaventura (FRA)

=== Semifinals ===
27 January 2023; 18:00	Spain	23–26	Denmark	Ergo Arena, Gdańsk; Attendance: 6,567; Referees: Schulze, Tönnies (GER)
27 January 2023; 18:00	A. Dujshebaev 5	(10–15)	Pytlick 6	Ergo Arena, Gdańsk; Attendance: 6,567; Referees: Schulze, Tönnies (GER)
27 January 2023; 18:00	1× (yellow card) 3× (suspension)	Report	3× (suspension)	Ergo Arena, Gdańsk; Attendance: 6,567; Referees: Schulze, Tönnies (GER)

27 January 2023; 21:00	France	31–26	Sweden	Tele2 Arena, Stockholm; Attendance: 19,128; Referees: Horáček, Novotný (CZE)
27 January 2023; 21:00	Fabregas 6	(16–12)	Johansson 5	Tele2 Arena, Stockholm; Attendance: 19,128; Referees: Horáček, Novotný (CZE)
27 January 2023; 21:00	3× (suspension)	Report	4× (suspension) 1× (red card)	Tele2 Arena, Stockholm; Attendance: 19,128; Referees: Horáček, Novotný (CZE)

=== Seventh place game ===
29 January 2023
15:30
Egypt
36–35 (ET)
Hungary
Tele2 Arena, Stockholm
Attendance: 8,980
Referees: Kurtagic, Wetterwik (SWE)
Zein 12
(17–11)
Bodó, Lékai 7
1× (yellow card) 3× (suspension)
Report
2× (yellow card) 6× (suspension)

FT: 28–28 ET: 3–3, 5–4

=== Fifth place game ===
29 January 2023; 13:00	Germany	28–24	Norway	Tele2 Arena, Stockholm; Attendance: 6,260; Referees: Marín, García (ESP)
29 January 2023; 13:00	three players 5	(16–13)	Gullerud 6	Tele2 Arena, Stockholm; Attendance: 6,260; Referees: Marín, García (ESP)
29 January 2023; 13:00	4× (suspension)	Report	1× (yellow card) 2× (suspension)	Tele2 Arena, Stockholm; Attendance: 6,260; Referees: Marín, García (ESP)

=== Third place game ===
29 January 2023; 18:00	Sweden	36–39	Spain	Tele2 Arena, Stockholm; Attendance: 22,650; Referees: C. Bonaventura, J. Bonaventura (FRA)
29 January 2023; 18:00	Wanne 9	(22–18)	Figueras 9	Tele2 Arena, Stockholm; Attendance: 22,650; Referees: C. Bonaventura, J. Bonaventura (FRA)
29 January 2023; 18:00	2× (yellow card) 3× (suspension)	Report	1× (yellow card) 5× (suspension)	Tele2 Arena, Stockholm; Attendance: 22,650; Referees: C. Bonaventura, J. Bonaventura (FRA)

=== Final ===
29 January 2023; 21:00	France	29–34	Denmark	Tele2 Arena, Stockholm; Attendance: 23,050; Referees: Nachevski, Nikolov (MKD)
29 January 2023; 21:00	Remili 6	(15–16)	Lauge 10	Tele2 Arena, Stockholm; Attendance: 23,050; Referees: Nachevski, Nikolov (MKD)
29 January 2023; 21:00	3× (suspension)	Report	1× (yellow card) 4× (suspension)	Tele2 Arena, Stockholm; Attendance: 23,050; Referees: Nachevski, Nikolov (MKD)

== Final ranking and awards ==
=== Final ranking ===
Places 1 to 8 and 25 to 32 were decided by play-off or knock-out. Teams finishing third in the main round were ranked 9th to 12th, teams finishing fourth in the main round 13th to 16th, teams finishing fifth in the main round 17th to 20th and teams ranked sixth 21st to 24th. In case of a tie in points gained, the goal difference of the main round were taken into account, then number of goals scored. If teams were still equal, number of points gained in the preliminary round were considered followed by the goal difference and then number of goals scored in the preliminary round.

Rank	Team
1st place, gold medalist(s)	Denmark
2nd place, silver medalist(s)	France
3rd place, bronze medalist(s)	Spain
4	Sweden
5	Germany
6	Norway
7	Egypt
8	Hungary
9	Croatia
10	Slovenia
11	Serbia
12	Iceland
13	Portugal
14	Netherlands
15	Poland
16	Bahrain
17	Brazil
18	Montenegro
19	Argentina
20	United States
21	Belgium
22	Qatar
23	Cape Verde
24	Iran
25	Tunisia
26	Chile
27	North Macedonia
28	South Korea
29	Saudi Arabia
30	Morocco
31	Algeria
32	Uruguay

Qualified for the 2024 Summer Olympics and the 2025 World Men's Handball Championship
Qualified for the Olympic Qualification Tournament

2023 Men's World Champions

Denmark
3rd title

Team roster: Niklas Landin Jacobsen, Niclas Kirkeløkke, Magnus Landin Jacobsen, Emil Jakobsen, Rasmus Lauge, Magnus Saugstrup, Hans Lindberg, Mathias Gidsel, Kevin Møller, Henrik Møllgaard, Mads Mensah Larsen, Mikkel Hansen, Lukas Jørgensen, Jóhan Hansen, Michael Damgaard, Jacob Holm, Simon Hald, Simon Pytlick, Mads Hoxer Hangaard, Lasse Møller
Head coach: Nikolaj Jacobsen

=== All-star Team ===
The All-star Team was announced on 29 January 2023.

Position	Player
Goalkeeper	(Germany) Andreas Wolff
Left wing	(Spain) Ángel Fernández Pérez
Left back	(Denmark) Simon Pytlick
Centre back	(France) Nedim Remili
Right back	(Spain) Alex Dujshebaev
Right wing	(Sweden) Niclas Ekberg
Pivot	(France) Ludovic Fabregas
Best young player	(Germany) Juri Knorr
MVP	(Denmark) Mathias Gidsel

== Statistics ==
=== Top goalscorers ===
Rank	Name	Goals	Shots	%
1	(Denmark) Mathias Gidsel	60	80	75
2	(Chile) Erwin Feuchtmann	54	77	70
3	(Germany) Juri Knorr	53	85	62
4	(Denmark) Simon Pytlick	51	70	73
5	(Iceland) Bjarki Már Elísson	45	59	76
6	(Hungary) Richárd Bodó	44	74	59
6	(Spain) Alex Dujshebaev	44	65	68
6	(Netherlands) Kay Smits	44	66	67
9	(Denmark) Mikkel Hansen	41	60	68
9	(Egypt) Ali Zein	41	64	64

Source: IHF

=== Top goalkeepers ===
Rank	Name	%	Saves	Shots
1	(Sweden) Tobias Thulin	39	39	100
2	(France) Rémi Desbonnet	38	36	95
3	(Norway) Torbjørn Bergerud	37	81	220
3	(Poland) Mateusz Kornecki	37	30	82
3	(Germany) Andreas Wolff	37	112	305
6	(Sweden) Andreas Palicka	36	72	202
7	(Egypt) Abdelrahman Mohamed	35	31	89
8	(Denmark) Niklas Landin Jacobsen	34	88	256
8	(Slovenia) Urban Lesjak	34	50	146
10	(Portugal) Miguel Ferreira	33	51	154
10	(Denmark) Kevin Møller	33	27	81
10	(Tunisia) Assil Nemli	33	34	104
10	(Croatia) Mate Šunjić	33	29	89

Source: IHF

== Broadcasters ==
Country	Channel
Argentina	TyC Sports, DirecTV
Belgium	VRT
Bahrain	Bahrain Sport
Bosnia and Herzegovina	Arena Sport
Caribbean	DirecTV
China	Huya Live
Croatia	RTL
Czech Republic	Česká televize
Denmark	DR1, TV 2
Estonia	Viaplay
Egypt	ONTime sport
Finland	Viaplay
France	TF1 (select matches), BeIN Sports
Georgia	Silknet
Germany	ARD / ZDF (select matches), Eurosport, Sportdeutschland.TV
Hungary	MTVA
Iceland	RÚV
Iran	IRIB Varzesh
Italy	Eleven Sport
Japan	Sportsbull
Kosovo	Arena Sport
Latin America	DirecTV
Montenegro	RTCG, Arena Sport
Morocco	Arryadia
North Macedonia	MRT (select matches), Arena Sport
Netherlands	Viaplay
Norway	TV3 (select matches), Viaplay
Poland	TVP (select matches), Viaplay
Portugal	RTP
Qatar	Alkass Sport
Romania	Prima Sport
Saudi Arabia	Shahid / SSC
Serbia	RTS, Arena Sport
Slovakia	RTVS
Slovenia	Radiotelevizija Slovenija, Arena Sport
Spain	Teledeporte
Sweden	TV6 / TV10 (select matches), Viaplay
Switzerland	SRG
Tunisia	El Watania 1 / El Watania 2
Ukraine	Poverhnost TV
United Kingdom	Viaplay
United States	ESPN
