= 2023 World Men's Handball Championship – European qualification =

The European qualification for the 2023 World Men's Handball Championship determined nine European contestants at the final tournament, which joined six already qualified teams: Sweden and Poland, as co-hosts, Denmark, as title holder, and three best ranked teams at 2022 European Men's Handball Championship excluding Sweden, Poland and Denmark.

== Format ==
The qualification campaign was organized into two phases.

In Phase 1, 16 teams not participating in the 2022 European Championship were split into four groups of four teams; the group winners and runners-up advanced to the second phase.

Phase 2 was divided into two parts.

Phase 2 part 1 comprised eight teams advancing from the first phase, joined by the best-ranked team according to the EHF Men´s National Team Ranking List. Those nine teams faced the nine lowest-ranked teams from the 2022 European Championship which had not qualified directly for the World Championship. The winners of nine ties (home and away matches) proceeded to the second part.

Phase 2 part 2 comprised the nine winners from the first part, who faced the nine highest-ranked teams from the 2022 European Championship which had not qualified directly for the World Championship. The winners of the nine ties (home and away matches) qualified for the 2023 World Men's Handball Championship.

== Qualification phase 1 ==
The draw took place on 19 August 2021. Each group can decide if they want to play home-and away matches or play the games at a single venue.

=== Seeding ===
Pot 1	Pot 2	Pot 3	Pot 4
Romania; Latvia; Belgium; Finland	Italy; Turkey; Israel; Estonia	Luxembourg; Greece; Cyprus; Georgia	Kosovo; Faroe Islands; Great Britain; Moldova

All times are UTC+1.

=== Group 1 ===
Pos	Team	Pld	W	D	L	GF	GA	GD	Pts	Qualification
1	Greece	6	6	0	0	170	136	+34	12	Qualification phase 2
2	Belgium	6	2	1	3	174	186	−12	5	Qualification phase 2
3	Turkey	6	2	0	4	147	163	−16	4	
4	Kosovo	6	1	1	4	151	157	−6	3	

Source: EHF
Rules for classification: 1) points; 2) head-to-head points; 3) head-to-head goal difference; 4) head-to-head number of goals scored; 5) goal difference.

3 November 2021; 16:00	Turkey	25–23	Kosovo	Porsuk Spor Salonu, Eskişehir; Attendance: 500; Referees: Bozhinovski, Nachevski (MKD)
3 November 2021; 16:00	Biçer 7	(15–14)	Gjuka 6	Porsuk Spor Salonu, Eskişehir; Attendance: 500; Referees: Bozhinovski, Nachevski (MKD)
3 November 2021; 16:00	4× (suspension)	Report	1× (yellow card) 4× (suspension)	Porsuk Spor Salonu, Eskişehir; Attendance: 500; Referees: Bozhinovski, Nachevski (MKD)

3 November 2021; 20:15	Belgium	27–29	Greece	Sporthal Alverberg, Hasselt; Attendance: 1,501; Referees: Martins, Martins (POR)
3 November 2021; 20:15	Glorieux 7	(12–14)	Tziras 10	Sporthal Alverberg, Hasselt; Attendance: 1,501; Referees: Martins, Martins (POR)
3 November 2021; 20:15	5× (suspension)	Report	1× (yellow card) 6× (suspension)	Sporthal Alverberg, Hasselt; Attendance: 1,501; Referees: Martins, Martins (POR)

7 November 2021; 16:00	Greece	24–20	Turkey	Heraklion Indoor Sports Arena, Heraklion; Attendance: 500; Referees: Madsen, Mortensen (DEN)
7 November 2021; 16:00	Mylonas 6	(10–9)	Simsar 5	Heraklion Indoor Sports Arena, Heraklion; Attendance: 500; Referees: Madsen, Mortensen (DEN)
7 November 2021; 16:00	1× (yellow card) 4× (suspension)	Report	2× (yellow card) 4× (suspension)	Heraklion Indoor Sports Arena, Heraklion; Attendance: 500; Referees: Madsen, Mortensen (DEN)

7 November 2021; 17:00	Kosovo	28–28	Belgium	Palace of Youth and Sports, Pristina; Attendance: 550; Referees: Ivanović, Vujisić (MNE)
7 November 2021; 17:00	Tahirukaj 6	(14–12)	Colman 6	Palace of Youth and Sports, Pristina; Attendance: 550; Referees: Ivanović, Vujisić (MNE)
7 November 2021; 17:00	1× (yellow card) 4× (suspension)	Report	1× (yellow card) 9× (suspension)	Palace of Youth and Sports, Pristina; Attendance: 550; Referees: Ivanović, Vujisić (MNE)

5 January 2022; 17:00	Turkey	30–25	Belgium	Kastamonu Atatürk Sport Hall, Kastamonu; Attendance: 3,500; Referees: Barysas, Petrušis (LTU)
5 January 2022; 17:00	Biçer 6	(17–14)	Serras 9	Kastamonu Atatürk Sport Hall, Kastamonu; Attendance: 3,500; Referees: Barysas, Petrušis (LTU)
5 January 2022; 17:00	2× (yellow card) 6× (suspension) 1× (red card)	Report	5× (suspension)	Kastamonu Atatürk Sport Hall, Kastamonu; Attendance: 3,500; Referees: Barysas, Petrušis (LTU)

5 January 2022; 17:00	Kosovo	20–21	Greece	Palace of Youth and Sports, Pristina; Attendance: 500; Referees: Mikelić, Parađina (CRO)
5 January 2022; 17:00	Dedaj 7	(9–13)	Kalomoiros, Mallios 6	Palace of Youth and Sports, Pristina; Attendance: 500; Referees: Mikelić, Parađina (CRO)
5 January 2022; 17:00	5× (suspension)	Report	1× (yellow card) 7× (suspension)	Palace of Youth and Sports, Pristina; Attendance: 500; Referees: Mikelić, Parađina (CRO)

8 January 2022; 20.15	Belgium	37–28	Turkey	Sporthal Alverberg, Hasselt; Attendance: 0 (Note: The match was played behind closed doors due to the COVID-19 pandemic.); Referees: Cindrić, Gonzurek (CRO)
8 January 2022; 20.15	Spooren 8	(17–13)	Simsar 8	Sporthal Alverberg, Hasselt; Attendance: 0 Referees: Cindrić, Gonzurek (CRO)
8 January 2022; 20.15	2× (yellow card) 2× (suspension)	Report	6× (suspension)	Sporthal Alverberg, Hasselt; Attendance: 0 Referees: Cindrić, Gonzurek (CRO)

9 January 2022; 14:00	Greece	26–25	Kosovo	Heraklion Indoor Sports Arena, Heraklion; Attendance: 50; Referees: Jerlecki, Łabuń (POL)
9 January 2022; 14:00	Mallios 5	(14–9)	Dedaj 6	Heraklion Indoor Sports Arena, Heraklion; Attendance: 50; Referees: Jerlecki, Łabuń (POL)
9 January 2022; 14:00	1× (yellow card) 6× (suspension)	Report	5× (suspension)	Heraklion Indoor Sports Arena, Heraklion; Attendance: 50; Referees: Jerlecki, Łabuń (POL)

12 January 2022; 19:15	Kosovo	26–24	Turkey	Palace of Youth and Sports, Pristina; Attendance: 650; Referees: Yovchev, Yonchev (BUL)
12 January 2022; 19:15	Dedaj 9	(13–13)	Biçer 6	Palace of Youth and Sports, Pristina; Attendance: 650; Referees: Yovchev, Yonchev (BUL)
12 January 2022; 19:15	1× (yellow card) 2× (suspension)	Report	1× (yellow card) 3× (suspension)	Palace of Youth and Sports, Pristina; Attendance: 650; Referees: Yovchev, Yonchev (BUL)

13 January 2022; 18:15	Greece	42–24	Belgium	Heraklion Indoor Sports Arena, Heraklion; Attendance: 200; Referees: Bolic, Hurich (AUT)
13 January 2022; 18:15	Arampatzis 9	(21–9)	Glorieux 5	Heraklion Indoor Sports Arena, Heraklion; Attendance: 200; Referees: Bolic, Hurich (AUT)
13 January 2022; 18:15	2× (yellow card) 3× (suspension)	Report	1× (yellow card) 4× (suspension)	Heraklion Indoor Sports Arena, Heraklion; Attendance: 200; Referees: Bolic, Hurich (AUT)

15 January 2022; 20:15	Belgium	33–29	Kosovo	Sporthal Alverberg, Hasselt; Attendance: 0 Referees: Čerņavskis, Bogdanovs (LAT)
15 January 2022; 20:15	Spooren 8	(18–12)	Tahirukaj 8	Sporthal Alverberg, Hasselt; Attendance: 0 Referees: Čerņavskis, Bogdanovs (LAT)
15 January 2022; 20:15	3× (suspension)	Report	1× (yellow card) 4× (suspension) 1× (red card)	Sporthal Alverberg, Hasselt; Attendance: 0 Referees: Čerņavskis, Bogdanovs (LAT)

16 January 2022; 12:00	Turkey	20–28	Greece	Hasan Dağı Spor Salonu, Aksaray; Attendance: 2,500; Referees: Horváth, Marton (HUN)
16 January 2022; 12:00	Hacıoğlu, Öztürk 4	(11–14)	Kostakidis 6	Hasan Dağı Spor Salonu, Aksaray; Attendance: 2,500; Referees: Horváth, Marton (HUN)
16 January 2022; 12:00	1× (yellow card) 5× (suspension) 1× (red card)	Report	3× (yellow card) 3× (suspension)	Hasan Dağı Spor Salonu, Aksaray; Attendance: 2,500; Referees: Horváth, Marton (HUN)

=== Group 2 ===
Pos	Team	Pld	W	D	L	GF	GA	GD	Pts	Qualification
1	Finland (H)	3	2	1	0	102	81	+21	5	Qualification phase 2
2	Estonia	3	2	0	1	95	84	+11	4	Qualification phase 2
3	Georgia	3	1	1	1	88	86	+2	3	
4	Great Britain	3	0	0	3	70	104	−34	0	

Source: EHF
Rules for classification: 1) points; 2) head-to-head points; 3) head-to-head goal difference; 4) head-to-head number of goals scored; 5) goal difference.
(H) Hosts

5 November 2021; 16:00	Finland	35–30	Estonia	Energia Areena, Vantaa; Attendance: 550; Referees: Šniurevičius, Grigalionis (LTU)
5 November 2021; 16:00	Helander 11	(17–15)	Toom 6	Energia Areena, Vantaa; Attendance: 550; Referees: Šniurevičius, Grigalionis (LTU)
5 November 2021; 16:00	5× (suspension) 1× (red card)	Report	5× (suspension)	Energia Areena, Vantaa; Attendance: 550; Referees: Šniurevičius, Grigalionis (LTU)

5 November 2021; 19:00	Georgia	32–26	Great Britain	Energia Areena, Vantaa; Attendance: 150; Referees: Weijmans, Wolbertus (NED)
5 November 2021; 19:00	Chanturia 6	(17–9)	Klaening 7	Energia Areena, Vantaa; Attendance: 150; Referees: Weijmans, Wolbertus (NED)
5 November 2021; 19:00	1× (yellow card) 5× (suspension)	Report	1× (yellow card) 2× (suspension)	Energia Areena, Vantaa; Attendance: 150; Referees: Weijmans, Wolbertus (NED)

6 November 2021; 15:00	Finland	29–29	Georgia	Energia Areena, Vantaa; Attendance: 600; Referees: Šniurevičius, Grigalionis (LTU)
6 November 2021; 15:00	M. Granlund, Helander 7	(15–18)	Kbilashvili 8	Energia Areena, Vantaa; Attendance: 600; Referees: Šniurevičius, Grigalionis (LTU)
6 November 2021; 15:00	4× (suspension)	Report	1× (yellow card) 8× (suspension) 1× (red card)	Energia Areena, Vantaa; Attendance: 600; Referees: Šniurevičius, Grigalionis (LTU)

6 November 2021; 18:00	Estonia	34–22	Great Britain	Energia Areena, Vantaa; Attendance: 150; Referees: Weijmans, Wolbertus (NED)
6 November 2021; 18:00	Varik 8	(20–10)	Edgar 8	Energia Areena, Vantaa; Attendance: 150; Referees: Weijmans, Wolbertus (NED)
6 November 2021; 18:00	1× (yellow card) 5× (suspension)	Report	6× (suspension)	Energia Areena, Vantaa; Attendance: 150; Referees: Weijmans, Wolbertus (NED)

7 November 2021; 14:00	Great Britain	22–38	Finland	Energia Areena, Vantaa; Attendance: 600; Referees: Weijmans, Wolbertus (NED)
7 November 2021; 14:00	Edgar 8	(10–16)	three players 6	Energia Areena, Vantaa; Attendance: 600; Referees: Weijmans, Wolbertus (NED)
7 November 2021; 14:00	4× (suspension)	Report	2× (yellow card) 5× (suspension)	Energia Areena, Vantaa; Attendance: 600; Referees: Weijmans, Wolbertus (NED)

7 November 2021; 17:00	Estonia	31–27	Georgia	Energia Areena, Vantaa; Attendance: 200; Referees: Šniurevičius, Grigalionis (LTU)
7 November 2021; 17:00	Rooba 10	(15–16)	Kbilashvili, Orjonikidze 6	Energia Areena, Vantaa; Attendance: 200; Referees: Šniurevičius, Grigalionis (LTU)
7 November 2021; 17:00	8× (suspension)	Report	1× (yellow card) 7× (suspension)	Energia Areena, Vantaa; Attendance: 200; Referees: Šniurevičius, Grigalionis (LTU)

=== Group 3 ===
Pos	Team	Pld	W	D	L	GF	GA	GD	Pts	Qualification
1	Romania (H)	3	3	0	0	76	53	+23	6	Qualification phase 2
2	Israel	3	2	0	1	82	64	+18	4	Qualification phase 2
3	Moldova	3	1	0	2	64	75	−11	2	
4	Cyprus (Note: Cyprus withdrew before the tournament because of several positive COVID-19 tests inside their team. All games were forfeited with a score of 10–0 for the opposing team.)	3	0	0	3	0	30	−30	0	Withdrawn

Updated to match(es) played on 8 January 2022. Source: EHF
Rules for classification: 1) points; 2) head-to-head points; 3) head-to-head goal difference; 4) head-to-head number of goals scored; 5) goal difference.
(H) Hosts
Notes:

7 January 2022; 17:00	Romania	33–30	Israel	BTarena, Cluj-Napoca; Attendance: 900; Referees: Caçador, Nicolau (POR)
7 January 2022; 17:00	Grigoraș 8	(18–18)	Lumbroso 9	BTarena, Cluj-Napoca; Attendance: 900; Referees: Caçador, Nicolau (POR)
7 January 2022; 17:00	3× (suspension)	Report	1× (yellow card) 5× (suspension) 1× (red card)	BTarena, Cluj-Napoca; Attendance: 900; Referees: Caçador, Nicolau (POR)

8 January 2022; 14:00	Israel	42–31	Moldova	BTarena, Cluj-Napoca; Attendance: 150; Referees: Novikov, Rozhkov (UKR)
8 January 2022; 14:00	Cohen 7	(22–13)	Dodica 9	BTarena, Cluj-Napoca; Attendance: 150; Referees: Novikov, Rozhkov (UKR)
8 January 2022; 14:00	3× (suspension)	Report	2× (suspension)	BTarena, Cluj-Napoca; Attendance: 150; Referees: Novikov, Rozhkov (UKR)

9 January 2022; 17:00	Moldova	23–33	Romania	BTarena, Cluj-Napoca; Attendance: 750; Referees: Novikov, Rozhkov (UKR)
9 January 2022; 17:00	Dodica 8	(15–18)	Cumpanici 5	BTarena, Cluj-Napoca; Attendance: 750; Referees: Novikov, Rozhkov (UKR)
9 January 2022; 17:00	3× (suspension)	Report	1× (yellow card) 4× (suspension)	BTarena, Cluj-Napoca; Attendance: 750; Referees: Novikov, Rozhkov (UKR)

Cancelled	Cyprus	0–10 (Note: The matches could not be played and were assessed by the EHF.)	Moldova

Cancelled	Romania	10–0	Cyprus

Cancelled	Israel	10–0	Cyprus

=== Group 4 ===
Pos	Team	Pld	W	D	L	GF	GA	GD	Pts	Qualification
1	Faroe Islands (H)	3	2	0	1	79	76	+3	4 (Note: Faroe Islands 27–26 Italy)	Qualification phase 2
2	Italy	3	2	0	1	91	78	+13	4	Qualification phase 2
3	Luxembourg	3	1	1	1	89	85	+4	3	
4	Latvia	3	0	1	2	72	92	−20	1	

Source: EHF
Rules for classification: 1) points; 2) head-to-head points; 3) head-to-head goal difference; 4) head-to-head number of goals scored; 5) goal difference.
(H) Hosts
Notes:

14 January 2022; 18:00	Latvia	23–36	Italy	Høllin á Hálsi, Tórshavn; Attendance: 75; Referees: Budzák, Záhradník (SVK)
14 January 2022; 18:00	Krištopāns 5	(13–21)	D'Antino 7	Høllin á Hálsi, Tórshavn; Attendance: 75; Referees: Budzák, Záhradník (SVK)
14 January 2022; 18:00	1× (yellow card) 8× (suspension)	Report	6× (suspension)	Høllin á Hálsi, Tórshavn; Attendance: 75; Referees: Budzák, Záhradník (SVK)

14 January 2022; 20:30	Luxembourg	31–26	Faroe Islands	Høllin á Hálsi, Tórshavn; Attendance: 400; Referees: Ivanauskas, Jencevicius (LTU)
14 January 2022; 20:30	Hoffmann 7	(11–10)	Teigum 9	Høllin á Hálsi, Tórshavn; Attendance: 400; Referees: Ivanauskas, Jencevicius (LTU)
14 January 2022; 20:30	1× (yellow card) 7× (suspension) 2× (red card)	Report	3× (suspension)	Høllin á Hálsi, Tórshavn; Attendance: 400; Referees: Ivanauskas, Jencevicius (LTU)

15 January 2022; 18:00	Latvia	30–30	Luxembourg	Høllin á Hálsi, Tórshavn; Attendance: 50; Referees: Budzák, Záhradník (SVK)
15 January 2022; 18:00	Pančenko 6	(18–15)	Wirtz 9	Høllin á Hálsi, Tórshavn; Attendance: 50; Referees: Budzák, Záhradník (SVK)
15 January 2022; 18:00	4× (suspension)	Report	8× (suspension) 1× (red card)	Høllin á Hálsi, Tórshavn; Attendance: 50; Referees: Budzák, Záhradník (SVK)

15 January 2022; 20:30	Italy	26–27	Faroe Islands	Høllin á Hálsi, Tórshavn; Attendance: 400; Referees: Ivanauskas, Jencevicius (LTU)
15 January 2022; 20:30	Parisini 6	(13–11)	Mikkelsen 7	Høllin á Hálsi, Tórshavn; Attendance: 400; Referees: Ivanauskas, Jencevicius (LTU)
15 January 2022; 20:30	2× (yellow card) 3× (suspension)	Report	1× (yellow card) 5× (suspension)	Høllin á Hálsi, Tórshavn; Attendance: 400; Referees: Ivanauskas, Jencevicius (LTU)

16 January 2022; 16:30	Italy	29–28	Luxembourg	Høllin á Hálsi, Tórshavn; Attendance: 50; Referees: Ivanauskas, Jencevicius (LTU)
16 January 2022; 16:30	Arcieri 10	(18–14)	Hoffmann 7	Høllin á Hálsi, Tórshavn; Attendance: 50; Referees: Ivanauskas, Jencevicius (LTU)
16 January 2022; 16:30	1× (yellow card) 3× (suspension)	Report	1× (yellow card) 7× (suspension) 1× (red card)	Høllin á Hálsi, Tórshavn; Attendance: 50; Referees: Ivanauskas, Jencevicius (LTU)

16 January 2022; 19:00	Faroe Islands	26–19	Latvia	Høllin á Hálsi, Tórshavn; Attendance: 400; Referees: Budzák, Záhradník (SVK)
16 January 2022; 19:00	Mikkelsen 5	(17–10)	Tuminskis 6	Høllin á Hálsi, Tórshavn; Attendance: 400; Referees: Budzák, Záhradník (SVK)
16 January 2022; 19:00	1× (yellow card) 4× (suspension)	Report	1× (yellow card) 6× (suspension)	Høllin á Hálsi, Tórshavn; Attendance: 400; Referees: Budzák, Záhradník (SVK)

== Qualification phase 2 ==
The qualification phase 2 draw took place on the final weekend of the EHF EURO 2022 in Budapest.

=== Part 1 ===
Eight teams advanced from the Phase 1 joined by Switzerland as the best ranked team which hasn't qualified for the 2022 European Men's Handball Championship, played against the nine lowest-ranked teams from 2022 European Men's Handball Championship. Matches were played between 14 and 20 March 2022.

==== Seeding ====
Pot 1	Pot 2
Austria; Belarus; Bosnia and Herzegovina; Lithuania; North Macedonia; Portugal; Slovakia; Slovenia; Ukraine	Belgium; Estonia; Faroe Islands; Finland; Israel; Greece; Italy; Romania; Switzerland

==== Overview ====
Team 1	Agg.	Team 2	1st leg	2nd leg
Ukraine	0–20 w/o (Note: Finland won on walkover as Ukraine could not play due to the Russian invasion of Ukraine.)	Finland	0–10	0–10
Italy	49–57	Slovenia	28–29	21–28
Portugal	66–54	Switzerland	33–26	33–28
Austria	62–57	Estonia	35–33	27–24
Greece	52–43	Bosnia and Herzegovina	24–17	28–26
North Macedonia	52–46	Romania	30–22	22–24
Israel	55–49	Lithuania	28–24	27–25
Slovakia	54–57	Belgium	28–26	26–31
Faroe Islands	20–0 w/o (Note: Faroe Islands won on walkover as the EHF suspended Belarus due to their involvement in the 2022 Russian invasion of Ukraine.)	Belarus	10–0	10–0

All times are UTC+1.

===== Matches =====
Cancelled (Note: The matches could not be played due to the 2022 Russian invasion of Ukraine.)	Ukraine	0–10	Finland

Cancelled	Finland	10–0	Ukraine

16 March 2022; 18:30	Italy	28–29	Slovenia	Kioene Arena, Padova; Attendance: 2,200; Referees: Bolic, Hurich (AUT)
16 March 2022; 18:30	Bronzo 7	(16–14)	Marguč 8	Kioene Arena, Padova; Attendance: 2,200; Referees: Bolic, Hurich (AUT)
16 March 2022; 18:30	1× (red card)	Report	1× (yellow card) 4× (suspension)	Kioene Arena, Padova; Attendance: 2,200; Referees: Bolic, Hurich (AUT)

20 March 2022; 14:30	Slovenia	28–21	Italy	Golovec Hall, Celje; Attendance: 2,000; Referees: Bíró, Kiss (HUN)
20 March 2022; 14:30	Bombač 7	(12–9)	Parisini 7	Golovec Hall, Celje; Attendance: 2,000; Referees: Bíró, Kiss (HUN)
20 March 2022; 14:30	1× (yellow card) 4× (suspension)	Report		Golovec Hall, Celje; Attendance: 2,000; Referees: Bíró, Kiss (HUN)

Slovenia won 57–49 on aggregate.

17 March 2022; 20:00	Portugal	33–26	Switzerland	Pavilhão Multiusos de Guimarães, Guimarães; Attendance: 3,000; Referees: Marín, García (ESP)
17 March 2022; 20:00	Iturriza 8	(15–12)	Rubin 7	Pavilhão Multiusos de Guimarães, Guimarães; Attendance: 3,000; Referees: Marín, García (ESP)
17 March 2022; 20:00	2× (yellow card) 1× (suspension)	Report	1× (yellow card) 2× (suspension)	Pavilhão Multiusos de Guimarães, Guimarães; Attendance: 3,000; Referees: Marín, García (ESP)

20 March 2022; 14:30	Switzerland	28–33	Portugal	Winterthur Central Sports Hall, Winterthur; Attendance: 1,950; Referees: Bonaventura, Bonaventura (FRA)
20 March 2022; 14:30	Rubin 6	(13–17)	Branquinho, Portela 5	Winterthur Central Sports Hall, Winterthur; Attendance: 1,950; Referees: Bonaventura, Bonaventura (FRA)
20 March 2022; 14:30	3× (yellow card) 5× (suspension)	Report	4× (suspension)	Winterthur Central Sports Hall, Winterthur; Attendance: 1,950; Referees: Bonaventura, Bonaventura (FRA)

Portugal won 66–54 on aggregate.

17 March 2022; 19:00	Austria	35–33	Estonia	Sporthalle Rieden-Vorkloster, Bregenz; Attendance: 1,250; Referees: Mitrevski, Todorovski (MKD)
17 March 2022; 19:00	Wagner 9	(15–16)	Toom 7	Sporthalle Rieden-Vorkloster, Bregenz; Attendance: 1,250; Referees: Mitrevski, Todorovski (MKD)
17 March 2022; 19:00	3× (suspension)	Report	4× (suspension)	Sporthalle Rieden-Vorkloster, Bregenz; Attendance: 1,250; Referees: Mitrevski, Todorovski (MKD)

20 March 2022; 18:40	Estonia	24–27	Austria	Kalev Sports Hall, Tallinn; Attendance: 500; Referees: Madsen, Mortensen (DEN)
20 March 2022; 18:40	Jaanimaa, Rooba 5	(13–14)	Frimmel 8	Kalev Sports Hall, Tallinn; Attendance: 500; Referees: Madsen, Mortensen (DEN)
20 March 2022; 18:40	2× (yellow card) 2× (suspension)	Report	1× (yellow card) 4× (suspension)	Kalev Sports Hall, Tallinn; Attendance: 500; Referees: Madsen, Mortensen (DEN)

Austria won 62–57 on aggregate.

16 March 2022; 18:15	Greece	24–17	Bosnia and Herzegovina	Tasos Kampouris Kanithou Indoor Hall, Chalcis; Attendance: 900; Referees: Pichon, Reveret (FRA)
16 March 2022; 18:15	Mallios 13	(10–8)	Građan, Jozinović 4	Tasos Kampouris Kanithou Indoor Hall, Chalcis; Attendance: 900; Referees: Pichon, Reveret (FRA)
16 March 2022; 18:15	1× (yellow card) 7× (suspension) 1× (red card)	Report	1× (yellow card) 5× (suspension)	Tasos Kampouris Kanithou Indoor Hall, Chalcis; Attendance: 900; Referees: Pichon, Reveret (FRA)

19 March 2022; 20:00	Bosnia and Herzegovina	26–28	Greece	KSPC Mejdan, Tuzla; Attendance: 3,000; Referees: Horáček, Novotný (CZE)
19 March 2022; 20:00	Kadrić, Ovčina 5	(10–12)	Boskos 10	KSPC Mejdan, Tuzla; Attendance: 3,000; Referees: Horáček, Novotný (CZE)
19 March 2022; 20:00	3× (suspension)	Report	5× (suspension)	KSPC Mejdan, Tuzla; Attendance: 3,000; Referees: Horáček, Novotný (CZE)

Greece won 52–43 on aggregate.

17 March 2022; 19:00	North Macedonia	30–22	Romania	Boris Trajkovski Sports Center, Skopje; Attendance: 5,500; Referees: Lah, Sok (SLO)
17 March 2022; 19:00	Taleski 10	(16–13)	Cumpãnici, Negru 5	Boris Trajkovski Sports Center, Skopje; Attendance: 5,500; Referees: Lah, Sok (SLO)
17 March 2022; 19:00	4× (suspension)	Report	2× (yellow card) 4× (suspension) 1× (red card)	Boris Trajkovski Sports Center, Skopje; Attendance: 5,500; Referees: Lah, Sok (SLO)

19 March 2022; 17:00	Romania	24–22	North Macedonia	Dinamo Polyvalent Hall, Bucharest; Attendance: 1,800; Referees: Schulze, Tönnies (GER)
19 March 2022; 17:00	Humet 7	(12–12)	Lazarov 6	Dinamo Polyvalent Hall, Bucharest; Attendance: 1,800; Referees: Schulze, Tönnies (GER)
19 March 2022; 17:00	1× (yellow card) 3× (suspension)	Report	1× (yellow card) 4× (suspension)	Dinamo Polyvalent Hall, Bucharest; Attendance: 1,800; Referees: Schulze, Tönnies (GER)

North Macedonia won 52–46 on aggregate.

16 March 2022; 18:00	Israel	28–24	Lithuania	Drive in Arena, Tel Aviv; Attendance: 1,200; Referees: Tzaferopoulos, Bethmann (GRE)
16 March 2022; 18:00	Sidi 7	(10–13)	Malašinskas 11	Drive in Arena, Tel Aviv; Attendance: 1,200; Referees: Tzaferopoulos, Bethmann (GRE)
16 March 2022; 18:00	1× (yellow card) 5× (suspension)	Report	1× (yellow card) 4× (suspension)	Drive in Arena, Tel Aviv; Attendance: 1,200; Referees: Tzaferopoulos, Bethmann (GRE)

20 March 2022; 15:00	Lithuania	25–27	Israel	Alytus Arena, Alytus; Attendance: 1,000; Referees: Budzák, Záhradník (SVK)
20 March 2022; 15:00	Dumčius, Malašinskas 5	(10–13)	Sidi 6	Alytus Arena, Alytus; Attendance: 1,000; Referees: Budzák, Záhradník (SVK)
20 March 2022; 15:00	6× (suspension)	Report	2× (yellow card) 3× (suspension)	Alytus Arena, Alytus; Attendance: 1,000; Referees: Budzák, Záhradník (SVK)

Israel won 55–49 on aggregate.

16 March 2022; 20:00	Slovakia	28–26	Belgium	Športová Hala Topoľčany, Topoľčany; Attendance: 1,000; Referees: Pirvu, Potirniche (ROU)
16 March 2022; 20:00	Urban 8	(10–14)	Spooren 7	Športová Hala Topoľčany, Topoľčany; Attendance: 1,000; Referees: Pirvu, Potirniche (ROU)
16 March 2022; 20:00	1× (yellow card) 3× (suspension)	Report	1× (yellow card) 2× (suspension)	Športová Hala Topoľčany, Topoľčany; Attendance: 1,000; Referees: Pirvu, Potirniche (ROU)

19 March 2022; 20:10	Belgium	31–26	Slovakia	Sporthal Alverberg, Hasselt; Attendance: 1,650; Referees: Álvarez, Bustamante (ESP)
19 March 2022; 20:10	Glorieux 6	(14–11)	Slaninka, Urban 5	Sporthal Alverberg, Hasselt; Attendance: 1,650; Referees: Álvarez, Bustamante (ESP)
19 March 2022; 20:10	1× (yellow card) 2× (suspension)	Report	1× (yellow card) 2× (suspension)	Sporthal Alverberg, Hasselt; Attendance: 1,650; Referees: Álvarez, Bustamante (ESP)

Belgium won 57–54 on aggregate.

Cancelled (Note: Belarus was excluded after their involvement in the 2022 Russian invasion of Ukraine.)	Faroe Islands	10–0	Belarus

Cancelled	Belarus	0–10	Faroe Islands

=== Part 2 ===
The winners from Part 1 advanced and faced the nine highest-ranked teams from 2022 European Men's Handball Championship (other than the six direct qualifiers as described at the beginning of the article). Matches were played between 11 and 17 April 2022.

==== Seeding ====
Pot 1	Pot 2
Croatia; Czech Republic; Germany; Hungary; Iceland; Montenegro; Netherlands; Russia; Serbia	Austria; Belgium; Faroe Islands; Finland; Greece; Israel; North Macedonia; Portugal; Slovenia

==== Overview ====
Team 1	Agg.	Team 2	1st leg	2nd leg
Finland	43–70	Croatia	21–34	22–36
Slovenia	51–57	Serbia	31–34	20–23
Portugal	65–61	Netherlands	30–33	35–28
Austria	56–68	Iceland	30–34	26–34
Greece	50–56	Montenegro	25–23	25–33
Czech Republic	49–51	North Macedonia	24–24	25–27
Israel	54–64	Hungary	32–33	22–31
Russia	0–20 w/o (Note: Belgium won on walkover as the EHF suspended Russia due to the 2022 Russian invasion of Ukraine.)	Belgium	0–10	0–10
Germany	67–53	Faroe Islands	34–26	33–27

===== Matches =====
All times are UTC+2.

13 April 2022; 18:00	Finland	21–34	Croatia	Energia Areena, Vantaa; Attendance: 1,400; Referees: Barysas, Petrušis (LTU)
13 April 2022; 18:00	Granlund 5	(9–16)	Glavaš 8	Energia Areena, Vantaa; Attendance: 1,400; Referees: Barysas, Petrušis (LTU)
13 April 2022; 18:00	1× (yellow card) 4× (suspension)	Report	1× (suspension)	Energia Areena, Vantaa; Attendance: 1,400; Referees: Barysas, Petrušis (LTU)

16 April 2022; 18:00	Croatia	36–22	Finland	Varaždin Arena, Varaždin; Attendance: 4,500; Referees: Bozhinovski, Nachevski (MKD)
16 April 2022; 18:00	Marić 7	(18–10)	Syrjälä 5	Varaždin Arena, Varaždin; Attendance: 4,500; Referees: Bozhinovski, Nachevski (MKD)
16 April 2022; 18:00	1× (yellow card) 2× (suspension)	Report	3× (suspension)	Varaždin Arena, Varaždin; Attendance: 4,500; Referees: Bozhinovski, Nachevski (MKD)

Croatia won 70–43 on aggregate.

13 April 2022; 20:00	Slovenia	31–34	Serbia	Zlatorog Arena, Celje; Attendance: 3,600; Referees: Stark, Ștefan (ROU)
13 April 2022; 20:00	Bombač 8	(16–20)	Đorđić 8	Zlatorog Arena, Celje; Attendance: 3,600; Referees: Stark, Ștefan (ROU)
13 April 2022; 20:00	2× (yellow card) 3× (suspension)	Report	1× (yellow card) 6× (suspension) 1× (red card)	Zlatorog Arena, Celje; Attendance: 3,600; Referees: Stark, Ștefan (ROU)

16 April 2022; 18:00	Serbia	23–20	Slovenia	Sport Centar Mladost, Kragujevac; Attendance: 3,500; Referees: Nikolov, Nachevski (MKD)
16 April 2022; 18:00	Ilić, Radivojević 4	(10–8)	Bombač 6	Sport Centar Mladost, Kragujevac; Attendance: 3,500; Referees: Nikolov, Nachevski (MKD)
16 April 2022; 18:00	1× (yellow card) 4× (suspension)	Report	2× (yellow card) 6× (suspension)	Sport Centar Mladost, Kragujevac; Attendance: 3,500; Referees: Nikolov, Nachevski (MKD)

Serbia won 57–51 on aggregate.

14 April 2022; 20:00	Portugal	30–33	Netherlands	Portimão Arena, Portimão; Attendance: 3,000; Referees: Nikolić, Stojković (SRB)
14 April 2022; 20:00	Iturriza 8	(16–17)	Smits 9	Portimão Arena, Portimão; Attendance: 3,000; Referees: Nikolić, Stojković (SRB)
14 April 2022; 20:00	3× (yellow card) 2× (suspension)	Report	3× (yellow card) 3× (suspension) 1× (red card)	Portimão Arena, Portimão; Attendance: 3,000; Referees: Nikolić, Stojković (SRB)

17 April 2022; 14:00	Netherlands	28–35	Portugal	Indoor Sportcentrum Eindhoven, Eindhoven; Attendance: 2,400; Referees: Gubica, Milošević (CRO)
17 April 2022; 14:00	Smits 8	(15–17)	M. Costa 10	Indoor Sportcentrum Eindhoven, Eindhoven; Attendance: 2,400; Referees: Gubica, Milošević (CRO)
17 April 2022; 14:00	1× (yellow card) 5× (suspension)	Report	1× (yellow card) 4× (suspension)	Indoor Sportcentrum Eindhoven, Eindhoven; Attendance: 2,400; Referees: Gubica, Milošević (CRO)

Portugal won 65–61 on aggregate.

13 April 2022; 18:00	Austria	30–34	Iceland	Sporthalle Rieden-Vorkloster, Bregenz; Attendance: 1,600; Referees: Boričić, Marković (SRB)
13 April 2022; 18:00	Zivkovic 6	(13–18)	Elísson 11	Sporthalle Rieden-Vorkloster, Bregenz; Attendance: 1,600; Referees: Boričić, Marković (SRB)
13 April 2022; 18:00	2× (yellow card) 3× (suspension)	Report	1× (yellow card) 5× (suspension)	Sporthalle Rieden-Vorkloster, Bregenz; Attendance: 1,600; Referees: Boričić, Marković (SRB)

16 April 2022; 18:00	Iceland	34–26	Austria	Íþróttamiðstöð Hauka, Hafnarfjörður; Attendance: 1,800; Referees: Gasmi, Gasmi (FRA)
16 April 2022; 18:00	Elísson 8	(19–15)	Wagner 6	Íþróttamiðstöð Hauka, Hafnarfjörður; Attendance: 1,800; Referees: Gasmi, Gasmi (FRA)
16 April 2022; 18:00	1× (yellow card) 3× (suspension)	Report	2× (suspension)	Íþróttamiðstöð Hauka, Hafnarfjörður; Attendance: 1,800; Referees: Gasmi, Gasmi (FRA)

Iceland won 68–56 on aggregate.

13 April 2022; 18:15	Greece	25–23	Montenegro	Tasos Kampouris Kanithou Indoor Hall, Chalcis; Attendance: 1,550; Referees: Caçador, Nicolau (POR)
13 April 2022; 18:15	Passias 5	(15–10)	M. Vujović 7	Tasos Kampouris Kanithou Indoor Hall, Chalcis; Attendance: 1,550; Referees: Caçador, Nicolau (POR)
13 April 2022; 18:15	1× (yellow card) 7× (suspension) 1× (red card)	Report	1× (yellow card) 7× (suspension)	Tasos Kampouris Kanithou Indoor Hall, Chalcis; Attendance: 1,550; Referees: Caçador, Nicolau (POR)

17 April 2022; 18:00	Montenegro	33–25	Greece	Morača Sports Center, Podgorica; Attendance: 5,000; Referees: Baumgart, Wild (GER)
17 April 2022; 18:00	B. Vujović 9	(16–12)	Tziras 8	Morača Sports Center, Podgorica; Attendance: 5,000; Referees: Baumgart, Wild (GER)
17 April 2022; 18:00	1× (yellow card) 5× (suspension)	Report	2× (yellow card) 4× (suspension)	Morača Sports Center, Podgorica; Attendance: 5,000; Referees: Baumgart, Wild (GER)

Montenegro won 56–50 on aggregate.

13 April 2022; 19:15	Czech Republic	24–24	North Macedonia	Datart Hala, Zlín; Attendance: 2,000; Referees: Erdoğan, Özdeniz (TUR)
13 April 2022; 19:15	Hrstka, Klíma 5	(10–13)	Taleski 5	Datart Hala, Zlín; Attendance: 2,000; Referees: Erdoğan, Özdeniz (TUR)
13 April 2022; 19:15	1× (yellow card) 4× (suspension)	Report	2× (yellow card) 5× (suspension)	Datart Hala, Zlín; Attendance: 2,000; Referees: Erdoğan, Özdeniz (TUR)

17 April 2022; 19:00	North Macedonia	27–25	Czech Republic	Boris Trajkovski Sports Center, Skopje; Attendance: 6,963; Referees: Santos, Fonseca (POR)
17 April 2022; 19:00	Kuzmanovski 9	(14–12)	Hrstka, Piroch 5	Boris Trajkovski Sports Center, Skopje; Attendance: 6,963; Referees: Santos, Fonseca (POR)
17 April 2022; 19:00	1× (yellow card) 5× (suspension)	Report	1× (yellow card) 3× (suspension)	Boris Trajkovski Sports Center, Skopje; Attendance: 6,963; Referees: Santos, Fonseca (POR)

North Macedonia won 51–49 on aggregate.

13 April 2022; 18:00	Israel	32–33	Hungary	Drive in Arena, Tel Aviv; Attendance: 1,200; Referees: Ivanović, Vujisić (MNE)
13 April 2022; 18:00	Cohen 9	(18–17)	Rodríguez Álvarez 7	Drive in Arena, Tel Aviv; Attendance: 1,200; Referees: Ivanović, Vujisić (MNE)
13 April 2022; 18:00	4× (suspension)	Report	1× (yellow card) 6× (suspension)	Drive in Arena, Tel Aviv; Attendance: 1,200; Referees: Ivanović, Vujisić (MNE)

16 April 2022; 17:30	Hungary	31–22	Israel	Tatabányai Multifunkcionális Sportcsarnok, Tatabánya; Attendance: 5,000; Referees: Jović, Arnautović (BIH)
16 April 2022; 17:30	Ancsin, Szita 6	(15–13)	Lumbroso 7	Tatabányai Multifunkcionális Sportcsarnok, Tatabánya; Attendance: 5,000; Referees: Jović, Arnautović (BIH)
16 April 2022; 17:30	1× (yellow card) 2× (suspension)	Report	1× (yellow card) 2× (suspension) 1× (red card)	Tatabányai Multifunkcionális Sportcsarnok, Tatabánya; Attendance: 5,000; Referees: Jović, Arnautović (BIH)

Hungary won 64–54 on aggregate.

Cancelled (Note: Russia was excluded after the Russian invasion of Ukraine.)	Russia	0–10	Belgium

Cancelled	Belgium	10–0	Russia

13 April 2022; 18:15	Germany	34–26	Faroe Islands	Wunderino Arena, Kiel; Attendance: 5,121; Referees: Lončar, Lončar (CRO)
13 April 2022; 18:15	four players 5	(17–11)	Ellefsen á Skipagøtu 5	Wunderino Arena, Kiel; Attendance: 5,121; Referees: Lončar, Lončar (CRO)
13 April 2022; 18:15	2× (yellow card) 7× (suspension)	Report	7× (suspension)	Wunderino Arena, Kiel; Attendance: 5,121; Referees: Lončar, Lončar (CRO)

16 April 2022; 20:00	Faroe Islands	27–33	Germany	Høllin á Hálsi, Tórshavn; Attendance: 1,698; Referees: Čerņavskis, Bogdanovs (LAT)
16 April 2022; 20:00	Ellefsen á Skipagøtu 9	(16–15)	Mertens 6	Høllin á Hálsi, Tórshavn; Attendance: 1,698; Referees: Čerņavskis, Bogdanovs (LAT)
16 April 2022; 20:00	2× (yellow card) 4× (suspension)	Report	1× (yellow card) 3× (suspension)	Høllin á Hálsi, Tórshavn; Attendance: 1,698; Referees: Čerņavskis, Bogdanovs (LAT)

Germany won 67–53 on aggregate.
