= Filip Kuzmanovski =

Macedonian handball player

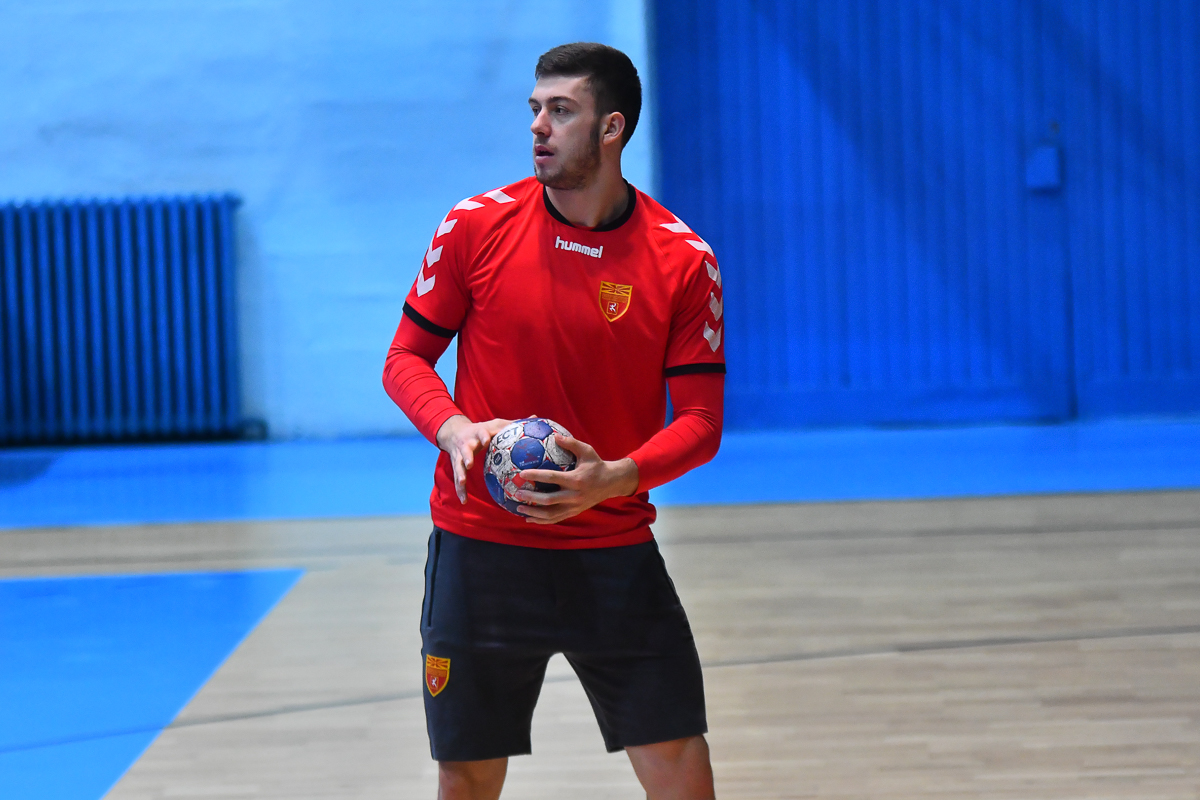

Personal information
- Nationality: Macedonian
- Born: 3 July 1996 (age 30) Bitola, Macedonia
- Height: 1.98 m (6 ft 6 in)

Sport
- Sport: Handball
- Position: Left back
- Current club: RK Eurofarm Pelister
- Number: 18

Youth career
- Years: Team
- –: RK Pelister

Senior clubs
- Years: Team
- –2015: RK Pelister
- 2015–2018: RK Metalurg Skopje
- 2018–2019: RK Eurofarm Rabotnik
- 2019–2020: SC Magdeburg
- 2020–02/2023: TSV Hannover-Burgdorf
- 02/2023–11/2023: HSG Wetzlar
- 11/2023–: RK Eurofarm Pelister
National team
Years	Team	Apps	(Gls)
2015–	North Macedonia	79	(262)
- Updated on 21 January 2025

Filip Kuzmanovski (Macedonian: Филип Кузмановски) (born 3 July 1996) is a Macedonian handball player who plays for RK Eurofarm Pelister and the Macedonian national team.

He has played in four World Championships (in 2019, 2021, 2023, and 2025), and five European Championships (in 2016, 2018, 2020, 2022, and 2024).

== Honours ==
Domestic (North Macedonia)

- RK Eurofarm Pelister – Macedonian Handball Super League (2022–23, 2023–24)
