= 2026 European Men's Handball Championship bidding process =

Bids for 17th edition of competition

The 2026 European Men's Handball Championship bidding process entails the bids for the 2026 European Men's Handball Championship. The winners were Denmark, Norway and Sweden.

== Bidding timeline ==
The bidding timeline was as follows:

- 4 June 2020 – Invitation to National Federations to provide a letter of intent to the EHF for hosting the EHF EUROs 2026 & 2028
- 1 October 2020 – Deadline for submitting the letter of intent and request for the bidding documents by the interested federations
- 1 November 2020 – Dispatch of the manual for staging the EHF EUROs 2026 & 2028 together with the relevant specifications and forms by the EHF
- 1 May 2021 – Applications available at the EHF Office
- May/June 2021 – Evaluation of bids by the EHF
- June 2021 – Approval of applications by EHF EXEC
- June–September 2021 – Site inspections
- September 2021 – Further evaluation after inspections
- September 2021 – Confirmation of bids for the EHF EUROs 2026 & 2028
- 17/18 November 2021 – Allocation at the EO EHF Congress 2021

== Bids ==
On 11 May 2021 it was announced that the following nations sent in an official expression of interest:

- Denmark, Norway & Sweden
- Switzerland (withdrew) in October 2021. Switzerland merged with the Iberian bid for 2028.

On 20 October, the final bids were presented. The Switzerland bid was withdrawn, leaving the Scandinavian bid unopposed.

- Denmark, Norway & Sweden

=== Denmark, Norway and Sweden ===
Denmark, Norway, and Sweden arena map

The Scandinavians decided to all bid for an EHF Euro together for the first time ever, under the slogan Scandinavia Connect. Their bids' aim is to use innovation and modern-day technologies to help Handball have a bright future.

The Swedish Handball Federation president, Frederik Rapp, stated “the commitment to finding sustainable solutions across all industries and areas of life is very clear in all of Scandinavia. To connect the Scandinavian approach and experience in sustainability with European handball is so valuable. Finding more sustainable solutions for future events could be a real game-changer for the future of our sport”.

While the Danish counterpart, Per Bertelsen said “We believe we can build on the positive momentum we see in our sport. Together, we can deliver a world-class event that will be a true celebration for European handball”.

The main round would be held in Malmö and either Copenhagen or Herning. The final weekend would be in the Jyske Bank Boxen in Herning. Every other venue will host preliminary round matches.

These are the following 9 venues included in the Scandinavian bid:

Denmark

- Herning – Jyske Bank Boxen, capacity 15,000
- Copenhagen – Royal Arena, capacity 13.000
- Aarhus – Ceres Arena, capacity 5,000

Norway

- Oslo – Telenor Arena, capacity 15,000
- Bergen – Byarena, capacity 12,000
- Trondheim – Trondheim Spektrum, capacity 9,000
- Stavanger – DNB Arena, capacity 5,000

Sweden

- Malmö – Malmö Arena, capacity 13,000
- Kristianstad – Kristianstad Arena, capacity 5,000

Venue that was deemed not suitable for tournament and is no longer part of the bid:

- Kolding – Sydbank Arena, capacity 5,100

== Withdrawn bids ==
=== Switzerland ===
Switzerland arena map

Before joining up with Spain and Portugal, Switzerland submitted a solo bid, under the slogan New heights For Handball. The preliminary round would be in Basel, Lausanne and Zürich, while the main round groups would be in Lausanne and Zürich. The final weekend would be held in Geneva. Every venue met the EHF's requirements. The Swiss' solo bid ended since Switzerland joined the Spain and Portugal bid for 2028.

The 5 venues that were proposed for Switzerland's bid are the following:

- Geneva – Palexpo, capacity 18,000
- Basel – St. Jakobshalle, capacity 12,400
- Zürich – Swiss Life Arena, capacity 12,000
- Zürich – Hallenstadion, capacity 11,200
- Lausanne – Vaudoise Aréna, capacity 9,700

=== France and Switzerland ===
In August 2020, France and Switzerland first stated an interest to applied to be the hosts of the 2026 and 2028 European Men's Handball Championship. While later, in October 2020, the French Handball Federation officially announced their intent to submit a joint bid with Switzerland. However, the bid quietly failed to materialise and Switzerland applied as a solo bid.

=== Belarus, Lithuania and Poland ===
As early as the 29 October 2018, Belarus and Poland considered bidding together. Then, on 19 February 2019, information was learnt stating that a joint bid from Belarus, Lithuania and Poland was in the works. On 18 September 2019, president of the Belarusian federation, Vladimir Konoplev, stated that he would try and get support from the post-Soviet countries, Lithuania would lobby for the Scandinavian countries' support, and Poland would receive Central Europe's support. Their bid was included in the list of nations that were interested in bidding. However, their bid deteriorated due to tensions between Belarus and the others two countries and their bid was not included as an official candidate for the 2026 EHF Euro.

==== Other countries ====
The following country stated an interest to the EHF, but they never made a formal bid and very few details were shared about their application:

- Croatia

== Host selection ==
As only the Scandinavian bid remained it was unanimously selected at the 14th EHF Extraordinary Congress on 20 November 2021.
