= 2028 European Men's Handball Championship bidding process =

The 2028 European Men's Handball Championship bidding process entails the bids for the 2028 European Men's Handball Championship. The winners were Spain, Portugal and Switzerland.

== Bidding timeline ==
The bidding timeline was as follows:

- 4 June 2020 – Invitation to National Federations to provide a letter of intent to the EHF for hosting the EHF EUROs 2026 & 2028
- 1 October 2020 – Deadline for submitting the letter of intent and request for the bidding documents by the interested federations
- 1 November 2020 – Dispatch of the manual for staging the EHF EUROs 2026 & 2028 together with the relevant specifications and forms by the EHF
- 1 May 2021 – Applications available at the EHF Office
- May/June 2021 – Evaluation of bids by the EHF
- June 2021 – Approval of applications by EHF EXEC
- June–September 2021 – Site inspections
- September 2021 – Further evaluation after inspections
- September 2021 – Confirmation of bids for the EHF EUROs 2026 & 2028
- 17/18 November 2021 – Allocation at the EO EHF Congress 2021

== Bids ==
On 11 May 2021 it was announced that the following nations sent in an official expression of interest:

- Switzerland (merged with Iberian bid)
- Spain & Portugal
- Denmark, Norway & Sweden (withdrew)

On 20 October the final bids were presented. The Scandinavian bid was withdrawn and the two others were joined.

- Spain, Portugal & Switzerland

=== Spain, Portugal and Switzerland ===
Iberian arena map
Switzerland arena map

Spain and Portugal originally submitted a joint bid together and was named as one of the three bids vying for the championships. On 20 October 2021, Switzerland merged their solo bid with Spain and Portugal to become a triple bid.

The following 11 venues have been proposed for Spain, Portugal and Switzerland's bid:

Spain

- Madrid – Santiago Bernabéu, capacity 83,186 (capacity as an arena is not known)
- Madrid – Wanda Metropolitano, capacity 70,460 (capacity as an arena is not known)
- Barcelona – Palau Sant Jordi, capacity 17,960
- Madrid – WiZink Center, capacity 17,453
- Valencia – Roig Arena, capacity 15,600

Portugal

- Lisbon – Altice Arena, capacity 12,000

Switzerland

- Geneva – Palexpo, capacity 18,000
- Basel – St. Jakobshalle, capacity 12,400
- Zürich – Swiss Life Arena, capacity 12,000
- Zürich – Hallenstadion, capacity 11,200
- Lausanne – Vaudoise Aréna, capacity 9,700

== Withdrawn bids ==
=== Denmark, Norway and Sweden ===
Denmark, Norway, and Sweden arena map

The Scandinavians decided to all bid for an EHF Euro together for the first time ever, under the slogan Scandinavia Connect. Their bids' aim is to use innovation and modern-day technologies to help Handball have a bright future.

The Swedish Handball Federation president, Frederik Rapp, stated “the commitment to finding sustainable solutions across all industries and areas of life is very clear in all of Scandinavia. To connect the Scandinavian approach and experience in sustainability with European handball is so valuable. Finding more sustainable solutions for future events could be a real game-changer for the future of our sport”.

While the Danish counterpart, Per Bertelsen said “We believe we can build on the positive momentum we see in our sport. Together, we can deliver a world-class event that will be a true celebration for European handball”.

The main round would be held in Malmö and either Copenhagen or Herning. The final weekend would have been in the Jyske Bank Boxen in Herning. Every other venue will host preliminary round matches.

However, they withdrew their 2028 bid to focus on their 2026 application, and ended up winning the hosting rights for 2026 unopposed.

These are the following 9 venues included in the Scandinavian bid:

Denmark

- Herning – Jyske Bank Boxen, capacity 15,000
- Copenhagen – Royal Arena, capacity 13.000
- Aarhus – Ceres Arena, capacity 5,000

Norway

- Oslo – Telenor Arena, capacity 15,000
- Bergen – Byarena, capacity 12,000
- Trondheim – Trondheim Spektrum, capacity 9,000
- Stavanger – DNB Arena, capacity 5,000

Sweden

- Malmö – Malmö Arena, capacity 13,000
- Kristianstad – Kristianstad Arena, capacity 5,000

Venue that was deemed not suitable for tournament and is no longer part of the bid:

- Kolding – Sydbank Arena, capacity 5,100

=== Spain and Portugal ===
Iberian arena map

The news of the bid started on 30 October 2020, when both federations signed an organisation deal. On November 11, 2020, the Spanish and Portuguese Handball federations confirmed that they would team up to try and co-host EHF Euro 2028. with matches in Lisbon, Madrid, Málaga, Ourense and Valencia. The Main Round groups would've been in Lisbon and Madrid, with the latter hosting the final weekend. Although, three of Spain's venues were deemed not suitable for the championship. Their slogan is We play under one anthem. Their bid as a duo ended since Switzerland joined their bid.

These were the proposed venues for Spain and Portugal's bid:

Spain

- Madrid – WiZink Center, capacity 17,453
- Málaga – Palacio de Deportes José María Martín Carpena, capacity 13.000
- Valencia – Pavelló Municipal Font de Sant Lluís, capacity 9,000
- Ourense – Pazo dos Deportes, capacity 6,000

Portugal

- Lisbon – Altice Arena, capacity 12,000

=== Switzerland ===
Switzerland arena map

Before joining up with Spain and Portugal, Switzerland submitted a solo bid, under the slogan New heights For Handball. The preliminary round would be in Basel, Lausanne and Zurich, while the main round groups would be in Lausanne and Zurich. The final weekend would be held in Geneva. Every venue met the EHF's requirements. The Swiss' solo bid ended since Switzerland joined the Spain and Portugal bid.

The 5 venues that were proposed for Switzerland's bid are the following:

- Geneva – Palexpo, capacity 18,000
- Basel – St. Jakobshalle, capacity 12,400
- Zurich – Swiss Life Arena, capacity 12,000
- Zurich – Hallenstadion, capacity 11,200
- Lausanne – Vaudoise Aréna, capacity 9,700

=== France and Switzerland ===
In August 2020, France and Switzerland first stated an interest to applied to be the hosts of the 2026 and 2028 European Men's Handball Championship. While later, in October 2020, the French Handball Federation officially announced their intent to submit a joint bid with Switzerland. However, the bid quietly failed to materialise and Switzerland applied as a solo bid.

==== Other countries ====
The following countries stated an interest to the EHF, but they never made a formal bid and very few details were shared about their application:

- Belgium
- Croatia
- Estonia

== Host selection ==
As only the Spain/Portugal/Switzerland bid was remaining it was unanimously selected at the 14th EHF Extraordinary Congress on 20 November 2021.
