= Viktor Gísli Hallgrímsson =

Icelandic handball player (born 2000)

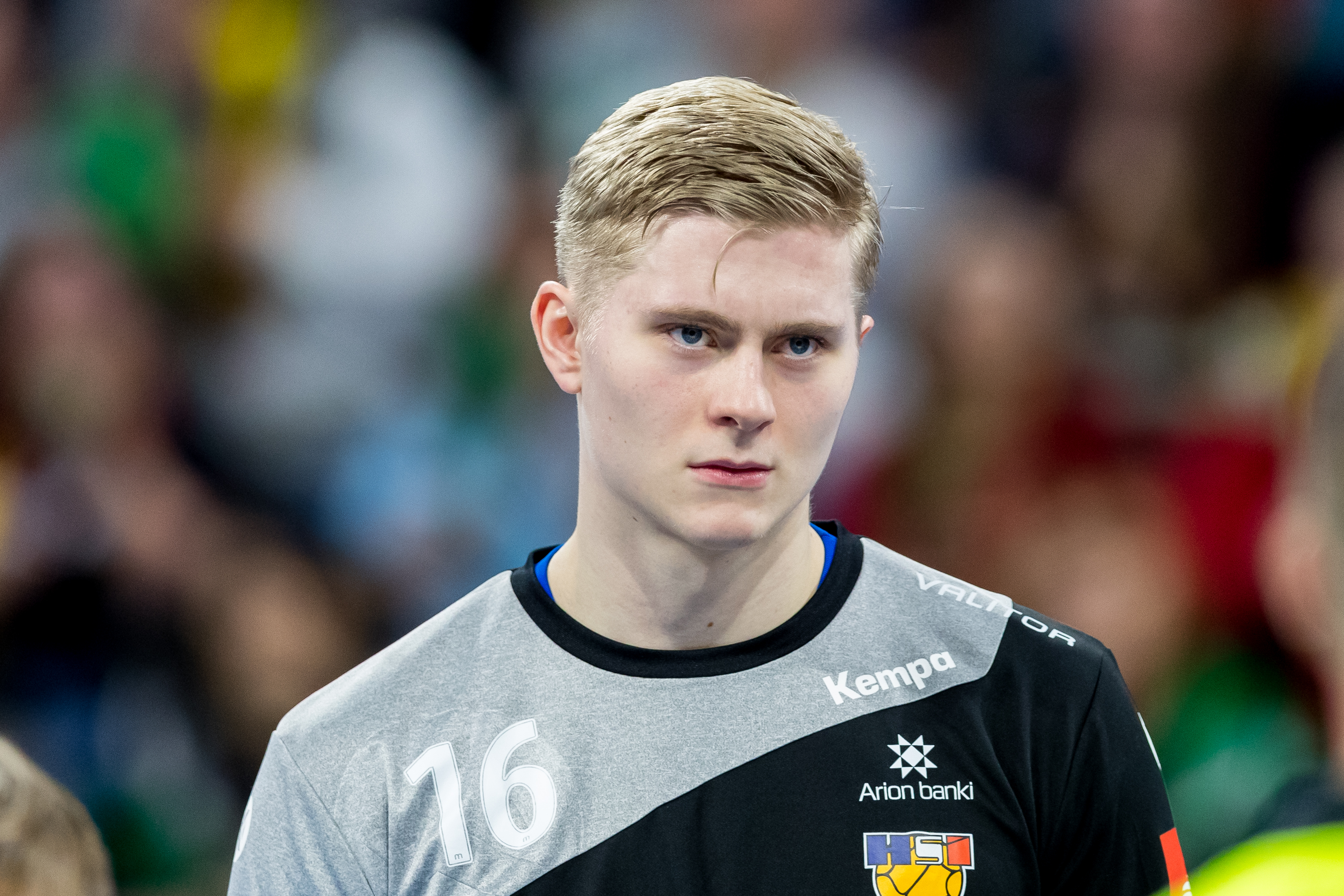

Personal information
- Nationality: Icelandic
- Born: 24 July 2000 (age 26) Reykjavík, Iceland
- Height: 2.03 m (6 ft 8 in)

Sport
- Sport: Handball
- Position: Goalkeeper
- Current club: FC Barcelona
- Number: 1

Youth career
- Years: Team
- –2016: Fram

Senior clubs
- Years: Team
- 2016–2019: Fram
- 2019–2022: GOG Håndbold
- 2022–2024: HBC Nantes
- 2024–2025: Wisła Płock
- 2025–: FC Barcelona
National team
Years	Team	Apps	(Gls)
–	Iceland	60	(1)
- Updated on 2. September 2025

Viktor Gísli Hallgrímsson (born 24 July 2000) is an Icelandic handball player for FC Barcelona and the Icelandic national team.

He represented Iceland at the 2020 European Men's Handball Championship, and in the 2021 World Men's Handball Championship. He is considered one of the best goalkeepers in his generation.

At the 2026 European Men's Handball Championship he finished 4th with Iceland, losing to Denmark in the semifinal and Croatia in the third-place playoff. He had the third most saves at the tournament behind Denmark's Emil Nielsen and Germany's Andreas Wolff.

== Individual awards ==
- All-Star goalkeeper of the European Championship: 2022
