= Kevin Møller =

Danish handball player (born 1989)

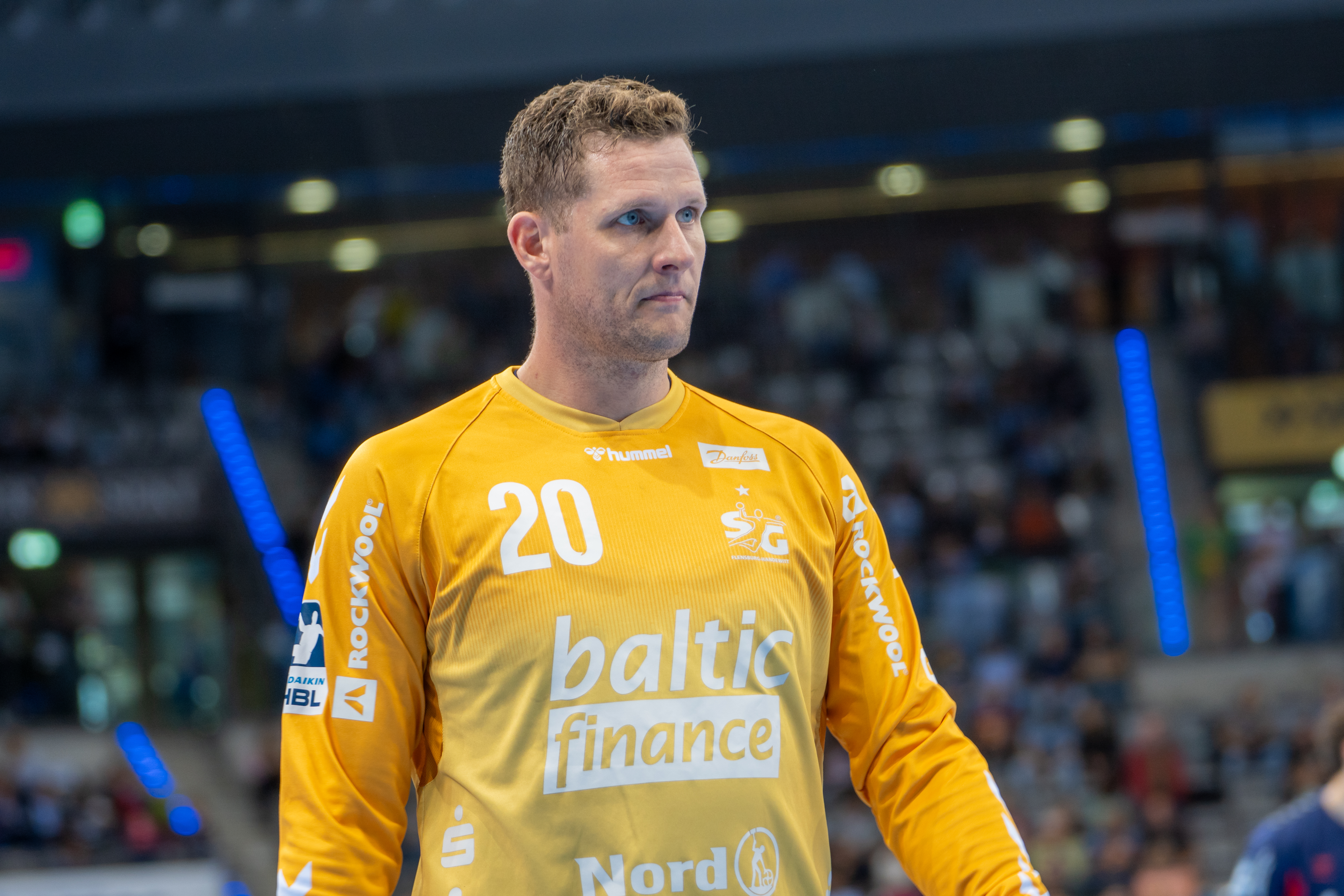
- Møller in 2024

Personal information
- Full name: Kevin Kam Møller
- Nationality: Danish
- Born: 20 June 1989 (age 37) Løgumkloster, Tønder, Denmark
- Height: 2.00 m (6 ft 7 in)

Sport
- Sport: Handball
- Position: Goalkeeper
- Current club: SG Flensburg-Handewitt

Youth career
- Years: Team
- –2005: Tinglev IF
- 2005–2008: GOG

Senior clubs
- Years: Team
- 2008–2010: Faaborg HK
- 2010–2011: Viking HK
- 2011–2014: GOG
- 2014–2018: SG Flensburg-Handewitt
- 2018–2021: FC Barcelona
- 2021–2026: SG Flensburg-Handewitt
- 2026–: GOG
National team
Years	Team	Apps	(Gls)
2015–	Denmark	79	(7)
Medal record
Olympic Games
Silver medal – second place	2020 Tokyo	Team
World Championship
Gold medal – first place	2021 Egypt
Gold medal – first place	2023 Poland/Sweden
Gold medal – first place	2025 Croatia/Denmark/Norway
European Championship
Gold medal – first place	2026 Denmark/Norway/Sweden
Bronze medal – third place	2022 Hungary/Slovakia

Kevin Kam Møller (born 20 June 1989) is a Danish handball player for SG Flensburg-Handewitt and for the Danish national team.

== Career ==
Møller started playing handball at Tinglev IF. He later joined the youth team of GOG Svendborg TGI, where he won the Danish U18 Championship in 2008. Afterwards he joined Faaborg HK for 2 years, before joining Norwegian side Viking Stavanger.

In 2011m he returned to GOG. In the 2014/2015 season he was named the best goalkeeper in the Danish league as part of the all-star team.

In 2014m he joined German Bundesliga team SG Flensburg-Handewitt, Here he won the DHB-Pokal in 2014/15, and the German Championship in 2018.

In 2018m he joined Spanish top club FC Barcelona Handbol. Here he won the Spanish treble (Liga ASOBAL, Copa del Rey de Balonmano, Copa ASOBAL) three times, in 2019, 2020 and 2021. He also won the 2021 EHF Champions League.

In 2021 he returned to Flensburg Handewitt, where he won the EHF European League in 2023/24.

== National team ==
On the Danish national team, he has mostly acted as a backup keeper to first Niklas Landin, and later to Emil Nielsen.

He won the 2021 and 2023 World Championships with the Danish national team.

At the 2020 Olympics, he won silver medals.

At the 2025 World Men's Handball Championshipm he was initially part of the squad, but left the tournament, when his wife went into labour. He was replaced by Jannick Green. Denmark later went on to win the tournament.

At the 2026 European Men's Handball Championship he won gold medals, meaning that Denmark held both the World, European and Olympic titles at the same time, as only the second team ever after France's 'Les Experts'. He acted mainly as a back-up to Emil Nielsen during the tournament, but would be substituted in and played a key role in the final against Germany, where he won the Player of the Match award.

== Honours ==
- EHF Champions League:
  - Gold: 2021
- Spanish Championship:
  - Gold: 2019, 2020, 2021
- Copa del Rey:
  - Gold: 2019, 2020, 2021
- Copa ASOBAL:
  - Gold: 2019, 2020, 2021
- Supercopa ASOBAL:
  - Gold: 2019, 2020, 2021
- German Championship:
  - Gold: 2018
  - Silver: 2016, 2017
  - Bronze: 2015
- DHB-Pokal:
  - Gold: 2015
- IHF Super Globe:
  - Gold: 2018, 2019
