= Johannes Golla =

German handball player (born 1997)

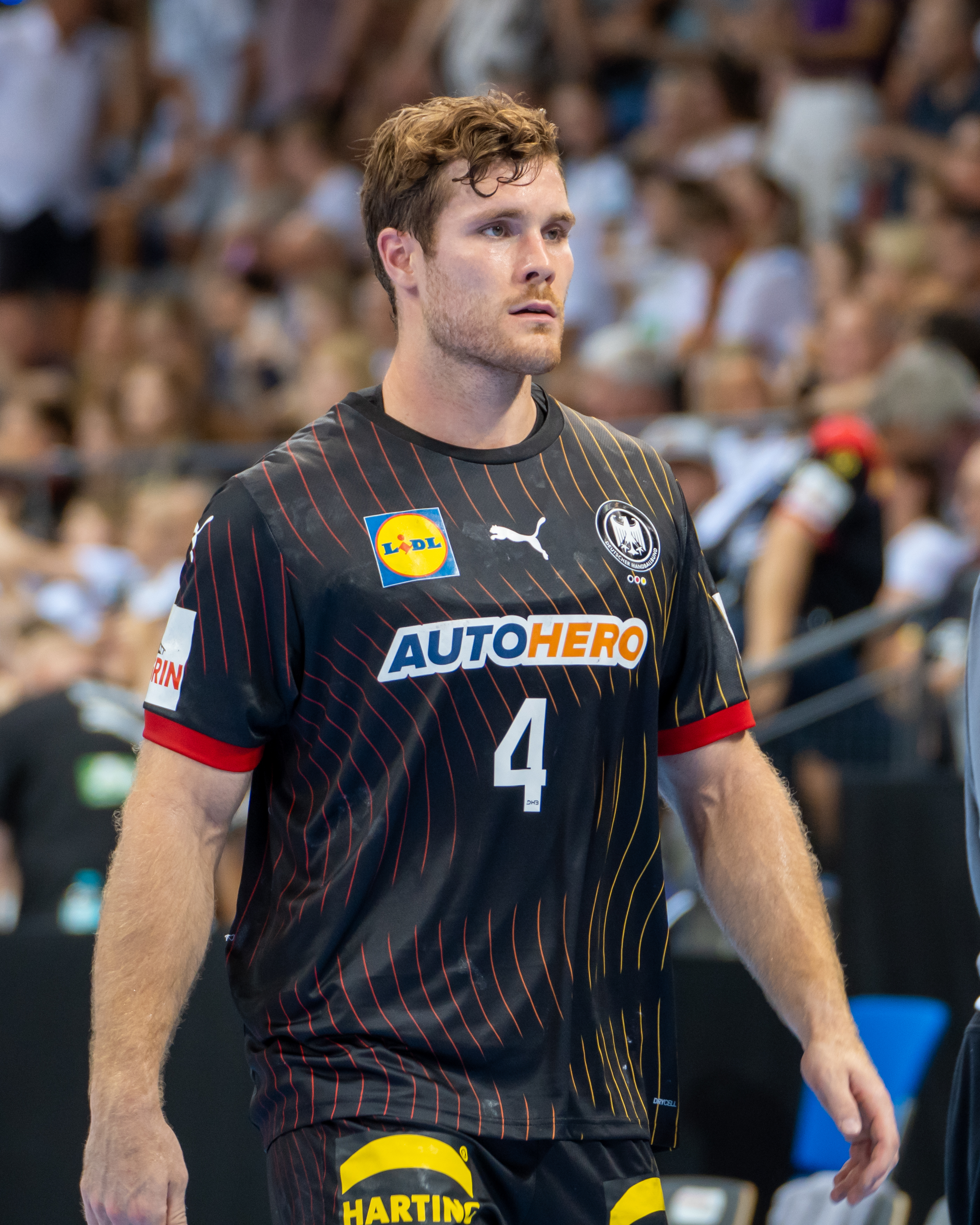
- Golla in 2024

Personal information
- Nationality: German
- Born: 5 November 1997 (age 29) Wiesbaden, Germany
- Height: 1.95 m (6 ft 5 in)

Sport
- Sport: Handball
- Position: Pivot
- Current club: MT Melsungen
- Number: 14

Youth career
- Years: Team
- 2003-2007: TG Eltville
- 2007-2010: TuS Dotzheim
- 2010-2012: SG Wallau-Massenheim
- 2012–2015: HSG VFR/Eintracht Wiesbaden
- 2015: MT Melsungen

Senior clubs
- Years: Team
- 2015–2018: MT Melsungen
- 2018–2026: SG Flensburg-Handewitt
- 2026–: MT Melsungen
National team
Years	Team	Apps	(Gls)
2019–	Germany	122	(423)
Medal record
Olympic Games
Silver medal – second place	2024 Paris	Team
European Championship
Silver medal – second place	2026 Denmark/Norway/Sweden
- Updated on 8 November 2026

Johannes Golla (born 5 November 1997) is a German handball player for MT Melsungen and the German national team.

Since 2021, he has been the captain of the German national team, succeeding Uwe Gensheimer.

== Career ==
Golla started playing handball at the age of 5 at TG Eltville. In 2015 he joined MT Melsungen. In 2016, he debuted for the senior team in the Bundesliga.

At the end of 2017, Golla announced that he wouldn't extend his contract, and at the start of the 2018/19 season, he joined league rivals SG Flensburg-Handewitt.

In 2019, he won the German championship and in 2024 and 2025, he won the EHF European League.

== National team ==
On March 9th 2019 he debuted for the German national team against Switzerland. He played his first major international tournament at the 2020 European Men's Handball Championship.

At the 2022 European Men's Handball Championship he was the German topscorer, and made the tournament all star team.

At the 2024 Olympics he won a silver medal with the German team.

At the 2026 European Men's Handball Championship he won silver medals, losing to Denmark in the final. He was selected as the all-star team pivot.

== Individual awards ==
- All-Star pivot of the European Championship: 2022, 2026
