= Simon Pytlick =

Danish handball player (born 2000)

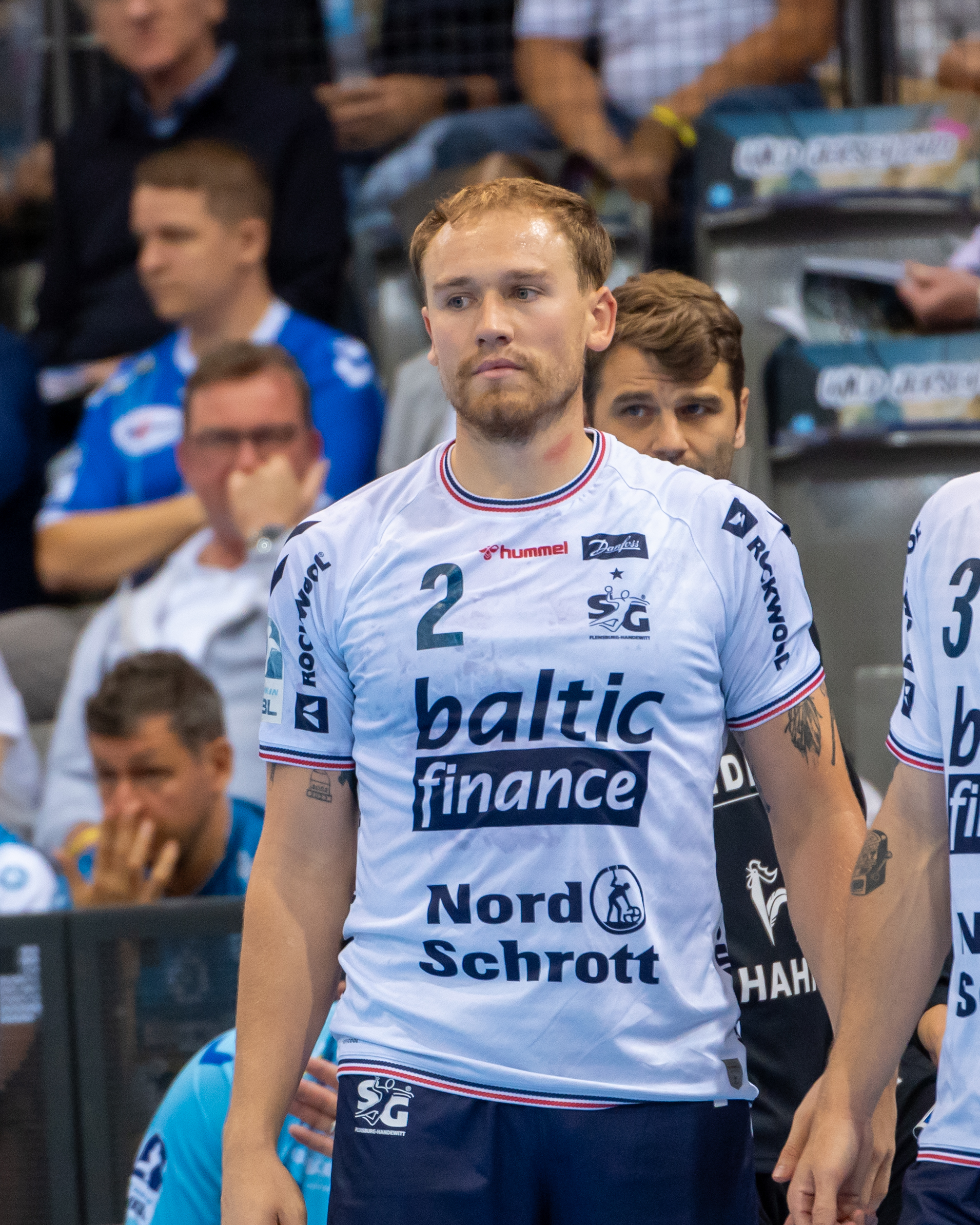
- Pytlick in 2024

Personal information
- Full name: Simon Bogetoft Pytlick
- Nationality: Danish
- Born: 11 December 2000 (age 25) Thurø, Denmark
- Height: 1.93 m (6 ft 4 in)

Sport
- Sport: Handball
- Position: Left back
- Current club: SG Flensburg-Handewitt
- Number: 2

Youth career
- Years: Team
- 2012–2018: GOG Håndbold

Senior clubs
- Years: Team
- 2018–2023: GOG Håndbold
- 2023–2027: SG Flensburg-Handewitt
- 2027–: Füchse Berlin
National team
Years	Team	Apps	(Gls)
2021–	Denmark	71	(350)
Medal record
Olympic Games
Gold medal – first place	2024 Paris	Team
World Championship
Gold medal – first place	2023 Poland/Sweden
Gold medal – first place	2025 Croatia/Denmark/Norway
European Championship
Gold medal – first place	2026 Denmark/Norway/Sweden
Silver medal – second place	2024 Germany
- Updated on 1 February 2026

Simon Bogetoft Pytlick (born 11 December 2000) is a Danish handball player for SG Flensburg-Handewitt and the Danish national team.

== National team ==
He made his debut for the Danish national team on 4 November 2021, against Norway at the 2021–22 Golden League Tournament in Trondheim. In 2023, he was part of the Danish team that won the World Championship. Initially, Pytlick expected to be a backup player to "patch some holes," but he became a major contributor, scoring nine goals in the final.

In November 2024, he was named vice-captain of the Danish national team behind Magnus Saugstrup.

At the 2026 European Men's Handball Championship he won gold medals, meaning that Denmark held both the World, European and Olympic titles at the same time, as only the second team ever after France's 'Les Experts'. He was the top scorer in the final with 8 goals, and 2nd in the tournament scoring charts behind teammate Mathias Gidsel.

== Club career ==
Pytlick began playing handball in the youth ranks of GOG Håndbold in 2012. He debuted in the Danish Men's Handball League in 2019, playing six matches and scoring ten goals in his first season. Due to teammate Emil Lærke's injury, he gained more playing time in the 2019–20 season and won the Talent of the Year award. The following season, he won the Danish championship and was selected for the league's All-Star team.

In 2022, Pytlick extended his contract with GOG but played only one more season, winning another Danish championship. In 2023, he signed with SG Flensburg-Handewitt. In February 2025, he broke his right arm during a match against Toulouse Handball in the EHF European League. Despite the injury, he extended his contract with Flensburg until 2030 in April 2025.

In December 2025 he announced his intention to join Füchse Berlin in the summer of 2027. He cited his friendship with national team colleague Mathias Gidsel as one of the primary reasons for the transfer.

== Achievements ==
- Danish Handball League:
  - Winner: 2022, 2023
  - Silver: 2019, 2020
- Danish Handball Cup:
  - Winner: 2019, 2022
- EHF European League:
  - Winner: 2024, 2025

Individual awards

- All-Star Left Back of the Olympic Games: 2024
- All-Star Team as Best Left Back at the World Championship: 2023, 2025
- All-Star Left Back of the European Championship: 2026
- All-Star Team as Best Left Back Danish League: 2021–22, 2022–23
- Danish Player of the Year: 2022
- Danish National Team Player of the Year: 2023
- EHF Excellence Awards Best Left Back of the Season: 2022–23
- EHF Excellence Awards MVP: 2022–23

== Personal life ==
Pytlick is the son of former handball coach Jan Pytlick and former handball player Berit Bogetoft. He is the brother of professional handball players Camilla Pytlick and Josephine Pytlick. His cousin, Andreas Haagen Pytlick, is also a professional handball player.
