= Uroš Kojadinović =

Serbian handball player (born 1997)

Personal information
- Nationality: Serbian
- Born: 26 September 2000 (age 26) Subotica, Serbia, FR Yugoslavia
- Height: 1.86 m (6 ft 1 in)

Sport
- Sport: Handball
- Position: Right back
- Current club: Fenix Toulouse
- Number: 17

Senior clubs
- Years: Team
- 2016–2021: Spartak Subotica
- 2021–2024: Partizan
- 2024–present: Fenix Toulouse
National team
Years	Team	Apps	(Gls)
2022–present	Serbia	23	(67)
Medal record
Mediterranean Games
Bronze medal – third place	2022 Oran	Team
- Updated on 15 January 2026

Uroš Kojadinović (Serbian Cyrillic: Урош Којадиновић; born 26 September 2000) is a Serbian handball player for Fenix Toulouse. He also represents the Serbian national team.

He represented Serbia at the 2024 European Men's Handball Championship and 2026 European Men's Handball Championship.
