= Dominik Kuzmanović =

Croatian handball player (born 2002)

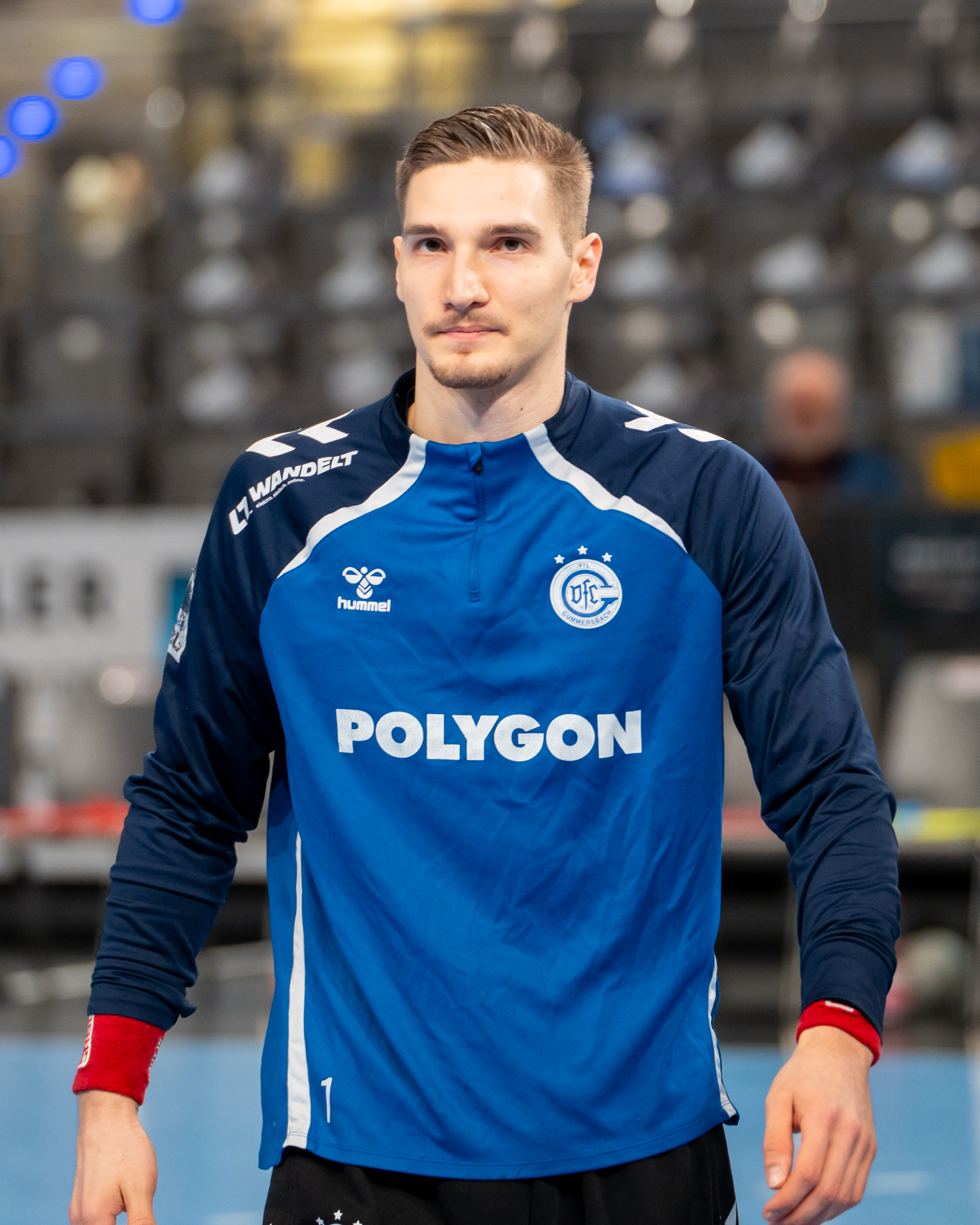
- Kuzmanović in 2025

Personal information
- Nationality: Croatian
- Born: 15 August 2002 (age 24) Dugo Selo, Croatia
- Height: 1.91 m (6 ft 3 in)

Sport
- Sport: Handball
- Position: Goalkeeper
- Current club: SC Magdeburg
- Number: 1

Senior clubs
- Years: Team
- 2020–2024: Nexe Našice
- 2024–2026: VfL Gummersbach
- 2026–: SC Magdeburg
National team
Years	Team	Apps	(Gls)
2023–	Croatia	39	(3)
Medal record
World Championship
Silver medal – second place	2025 Croatia/Denmark/Norway
European Championship
Bronze medal – third place	2026 Denmark/Norway/Sweden
- Updated on 3 February 2025

Dominik Kuzmanović (born 15 August 2002) is a Croatian handball player for German club SC Magdeburg and the Croatian national team.

== Early life ==
Kuzmanović was born on 15 August 2002 in Dugo Selo. He started playing handball at the age of five. Kuzmanović attended Stjepan Radić Elementary School in Brckovljani, where his teachers described him as an excellent student who excelled at all school subjects, including mathematics. He later began to practice taekwondo, which helped him in the position of a handball goalkeeper.

== Club career ==
With his youth club Dugo Selo, Kuzmanović won the Croatian national championship. In 2019, he joined top- division team Nexe Našice, where the club finished second place in the Croatian Handball Premier League.

In 2024, Kuzmanović joined German side VfL Gummersbach. In 2025 and 2026, he was named Croatian handballer of the year.

=== National team ===
With the Croatian youth national team, Kuzmanović won gold medals at the 2019 European Youth Summer Olympic Festival. At the 2021 European Men's U-19 Handball Championship, he won silver medals with the Croatian youth team. Kuzmanović represented Croatia at the 2023 World Men's Handball Championship, playing in four matches. In the 2025 World Men's Handball Championship, where Croatia finished second place, he played a crucial role in eight matches with his 36% save accuracy.

At the 2026 European Men's Handball Championship he won bronze medals with Croatia, losing to Germany in the semifinal and beating Iceland in the third-place playoff.
