= 2030 European Men's Handball Championship =

2030 EHF European Men's Handball Championship
Tournament details
- Host countries: Czech Republic; Denmark; Poland
- Venues: 3 (in 3 host cities)
- Dates: 10–27 January
- Teams: 24 (from 1 confederation)

The 2030 EHF European Men's Handball Championship, commonly referred to as the EHF EURO 2030, will be the 19th edition of the EHF European Men's Handball Championship, the biennial international men's handball championship of Europe organized by the EHF. The tournament will be held in Czech Republic, Poland and Denmark from 10 to 27 January 2030.

== Bid process ==
=== Bidding timeline ===
The bidding timeline was as follows:

2 August 2023	Invitation to National Federations to provide a letter of intent to the EHF for hosting the EHF EUROs 2030 & 2032
1 November 2023	Deadline for submitting the letter of intent and request for the bidding documents by the interested federations
November 2023	Dispatch of the manual for staging the EHF EUROs 2030 & 2032 together with the relevant specifications and forms by the EHF
1 June 2024	Applications available at the EHF Office and deadline to submit a formal bid
21 June 2024	Approval of applications by EHF EXEC
July and September 2024	Site inspections
End of September	Confirmation of bids for the EHF EUROs 2030 & 2032
December 2024	Allocation at the EO EHF Congress 2024

=== Bids ===
On 3 November 2023, it was announced that the following nations sent in an official expression of interest:

- Austria
- Czech Republic
- Denmark
- Estonia
- France
- Germany
- Poland
- Switzerland

On 11 June 2024, the official bids were announced.

- Croatia (withdrew)
- Czech Republic/Denmark/Poland
- France/Germany (formerly with Switzerland) (withdrew)

On 20 September 2024, both bids were approved by the EHF. However shortly before the host announcement, Croatia withdrew. Czech Republic, Denmark and Poland won unopposed on 14 December.

==== Voting results ====
Country
Country	Votes
Czech Republic & Denmark & Poland	42
Against the bid	0
Total	42

== Format change ==
Starting this edition, a format change could be implemented.

== Qualified teams ==
Country	Qualified as	Qualified on	Previous appearances in tournament
Czech Republic	Co-host	14 December 2024	11 (1996, 1998, 2002, 2004, 2008, 2010, 2012, 2014, 2018, 2020, 2022)
Denmark	Co-host	14 December 2024	16 (1994, 1996, 2000, 2002, 2004, 2006, **2008**, 2010, **2012**, 2014, 2016, 2018, 2020, 2022, 2024, 2026)
Poland	Co-host	14 December 2024	11 (2002, 2004, 2006, 2008, 2010, 2012, 2014, 2016, 2020, 2022, 2024)

Note: Bold indicates champion for that year. Italic indicates host for that year.

== Venues ==
The venues from the bid are as follows:

- (Czech Republic) Prague – O2 Arena, capacity 17,500
- (Poland) Katowice – Spodek, capacity 11,016
- (Denmark) Herning – Jyske Bank Boxen, capacity 16,000
