= Emil Nielsen (handballer) =

Danish handball player (born 1997)

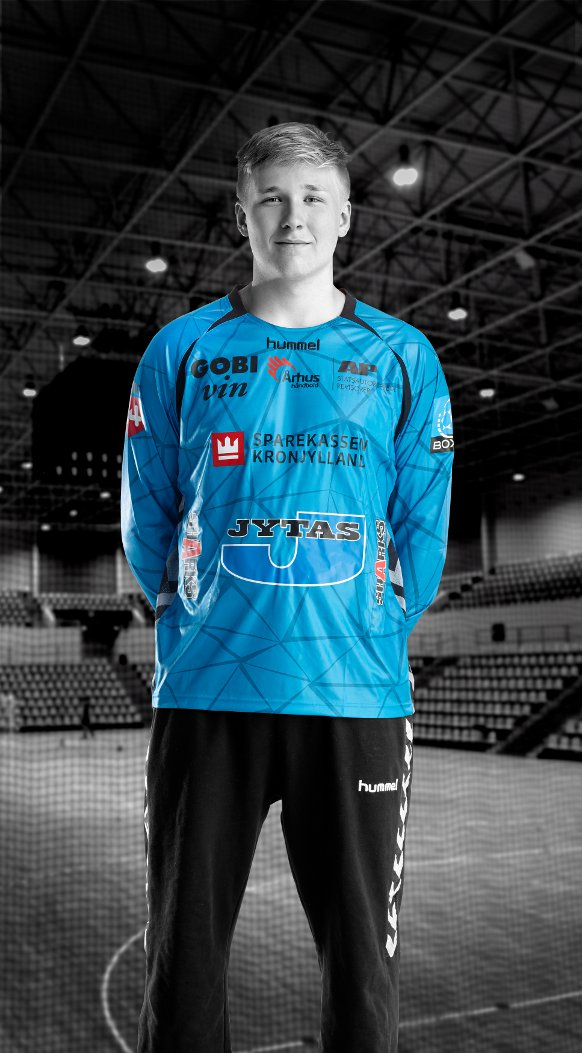
- Nielsen in 2016

Personal information
- Nationality: Danish
- Born: 10 March 1997 (age 29) Aarhus, Denmark
- Height: 1.95 m (6 ft 5 in)

Sport
- Sport: Handball
- Position: Goalkeeper
- Current club: FC Barcelona
- Number: 12

Youth career
- Years: Team
- –: AGF/Viby Håndbold

Senior clubs
- Years: Team
- 2015–2017: Aarhus Håndbold
- 2017–2019: Skjern Håndbold
- 2019–2022: HBC Nantes
- 2022–2026: FC Barcelona
- 2026–: ONE Veszprém
National team
Years	Team	Apps	(Gls)
2018–	Denmark	77	(6)
Medal record
Olympic Games
Gold medal – first place	2024 Paris	Team
World Championship
Gold medal – first place	2021 Egypt
Gold medal – first place	2025 Croatia/Denmark/Norway
European Championship
Gold medal – first place	2026 Denmark/Norway/Sweden
Silver medal – second place	2024 Germany
- Updated on 28 January 2026

Emil Nielsen (born 10 March 1997) is a Danish handball player for FC Barcelona and the Danish national team.

He made his debut on the Danish national team on 5 April 2018.

== Career ==
Nielsen started playing handball at the age of 10 and made his debut for Aarhus Håndbold at 17. He got his chance in the first team when first choice goalkeeper Jan Nielsen was injured. With time he would overtake the first choice position from the veteran Jan Nielsen, who acted as a mentor for the young goalkeeper. In the 2014–15 season, he achieved the best save ratio in Herreligaen, with 38%. By age 19, Danish coach Ulrik Wilbek had already labeled him as the "biggest talent" in his position.

At the end of the 2016 season, when he was 20 years old, Nielsen was diagnosed with meningitis, a condition that nearly ended his career. Despite his health challenges, Nielsen attracted interest from Danish club Skjern Håndbold, who signed him even though he was unable to participate at the start of the season. With Skjern he won the Danish championship in 2018.

Two years later, he made his international debut for the Denmark national team. However, he did not achieve immediate success with the Danish national team and was left out in 2019 after national coach Nikolaj Jacobsen stated that he did not meet the "professional standards" required. He was reportedly deemed insufficiently stable in his goalkeeping and not diligent in following his training regimen, according to national team goalkeeping coach Michael Bruun.

In 2019, he signed a three-year contract with the French LNH Division 1 club HBC Nantes, which, according to TV 2 Denmark, paid a transfer fee of approximately DKK 1 million. Nielsen enjoyed a successful stint at Nantes, and in 2022, he signed with FC Barcelona Handbol. There, he won the treble in his first season.

He represented Denmark at the 2021 World Men's Handball Championship, where Denmark won gold medals.

His breakthrough on the Danish national team would come at the 2024 European Championship, where he had the tournament's overall highest saving percentage and the third most overall saves. Nielsen ended up starring in the final, being named player of the match, though he was unable to secure victory, as Denmark lost to France in extra time.

Following Niklas Landin's retirement from the national team, Emil Nielsen was Denmark's first choice goalkeeper for the 2025 World Championship, where Denmark won gold medals.

In July 2025 he announced that he will join Hungarian ONE Veszprém from the 2026–27 season onwards.

At the 2026 European Men's Handball Championship he won gold medals, meaning that Denmark held both the World, European and Olympic titles at the same time, as only the second team ever after France's 'Les Experts'. He had the second most saves at the tournament with 80 behind Germany's Andreas Wolff. After the final he did however say that he was not satisfied with his own performance.

== Personal life ==
Nielsen grew up in Aarhus, Denmark. He began his primary education at Laursens Realskole in 2004, continued his studies at Risskov Efterskole, and completed his secondary education at Marselisborg Gymnasium from 2014 to 2016.

During the 2024 Summer Olympics, Nielsen's father died, but he stayed in Paris and continued to compete, contributing to Denmark's gold medal victory. He received support from teammates and psychological assistance during the tournament.

== Honours ==
- Danish Championship
  - Winner: 2018
- Coupe de la Ligue
  - Winner: 2021–22
- Liga ASOBAL
  - Winner: 2023, 2024, 2025, 2026
- Copa ASOBAL
  - Winner: 2023, 2024, 2025, 2026
- Copa del Rey
  - Winner: 2023, 2024, 2025, 2026
- Supercopa Ibérica
  - Winner: 2022, 2023, 2024, 2025
- EHF Champions League
  - Winner: 2024, 2026
  - Bronze medal: 2023
- IHF Super Globe
  - Gold medal: 2025
  - Silver medal: 2022
  - Bronze medal: 2023

Individual awards

- Best Goalkeeper of the World Championship: 2025
- EHF Excellence Awards: Goalkeeper of the Season 2023/24, 2024/25, 2025/26
- EHF Excellence Awards: Most Valuable Player 2023/24, 2025/26
- Best Goalkeeper of the European Men's U-18 Handball Championship: 2014
