= 2028 European Men's Handball Championship =

18th edition of the EHF European Men's Handball Championship

2028 EHF European Men's Handball Championship
Campeonato Europeo de Balonmano Masculino de 2028 (in Spanish) Campeonato Europeu de Andebol Masculino de 2028 (in Portuguese) Championnat d'Europe masculin de handball 2028 (in French) Handball-Europameisterschaft der Männer 2028 (in German) Campionato europeo maschile di pallamano 2028 (in Italian) Campiunadi Europei da Ballamaun Masculin 2028 (in Romansh)
- Unleash the Extraordinary

Tournament details
- Host countries: Portugal; Spain; Switzerland
- Venues: 6 (in 4 host cities)
- Dates: 13–30 January
- Teams: 24 (from 1 confederation)

The 2028 EHF European Men's Handball Championship, commonly referred to as the Men's EHF Euro 2028, will be the 18th edition of the European Men's Handball Championship, the biennial international handball competition for men's national teams organized by the European Handball Federation (EHF). It will be co-hosted by Portugal, Spain and Switzerland in six venues across four cities, from 13 to 30 January 2028.

24 teams will participate for the fourth time. Qualification started in January 2025 and will end in May 2027 to decide the final 12 spots. The three co-hosts qualified automatically, alongside the defending champions Denmark.

The winner will qualify for the next edition in Czech Republic, Denmark and Poland and the 2029 World Men's Handball Championship in France and Germany.

Denmark are the defending champions after defeating Germany 34–27 in the final in Herning.

== Bid process ==
=== Bids ===
On 11 May 2021 it was announced that the following nations sent in an official expression of interest:

- Switzerland
- Portugal & Spain
- Denmark, Norway & Sweden

On 20 October the final bids were presented. The Scandinavian bid was withdrawn and the two others were mixed together.

- Portugal, Spain & Switzerland

=== Host selection ===
As only the Portugal/Spain/Switzerland bid was remaining, it was unanimously selected at the 14th EHF Extraordinary Congress on 20 November 2021.

== Qualification ==
Türkiye vs Norway in 8 November 2026 at THF Serdar Seymen Handball Hall

=== Qualified teams ===
Team	Qualification method	Date of qualification	Appearance(s)				Previous best performance (Note: Bold text indicates they hosted that edition.)	Rank
Team	Qualification method	Date of qualification	Total	First	Last	Streak	Previous best performance	Rank
Portugal	Host nation	20 November 2021	10th	1994	2026	5	Fifth place (2026)	TBD
Spain	Host nation	20 November 2021	18th	1994	2026	18	Champions (2018, 2020)	TBD
Switzerland	Host nation	20 November 2021	7th	2002	2026	3	Twelfth place (2004)	TBD
Denmark	Defending champions	1 February 2026	17th	1994	2026	15	Champions (2008, 2012, 2026)	TBD

== Final Tournament ==
=== Draw ===
The Final tournament draw will take place in May 2027.

=== Venues ===
Four host cities were confirmed on 31 January 2026. One in each country Switzerland and Portugal, two host cities in Spain.

Confirmed venues
Country	City	Arena	Tournament phase
Spain	Madrid	Movistar Arena	Final Weekend
Spain	Valencia	Font de San Lluís	Preliminary Round Groups A & B, Main Round Group I
Switzerland	Zürich	Swiss Life Arena	Preliminary Round Groups C & D
Portugal	Lisbon	MEO Arena	Preliminary Round Groups E & F, Main Round Group II
