= Andreas Wolff =

German handball player (born 1991)

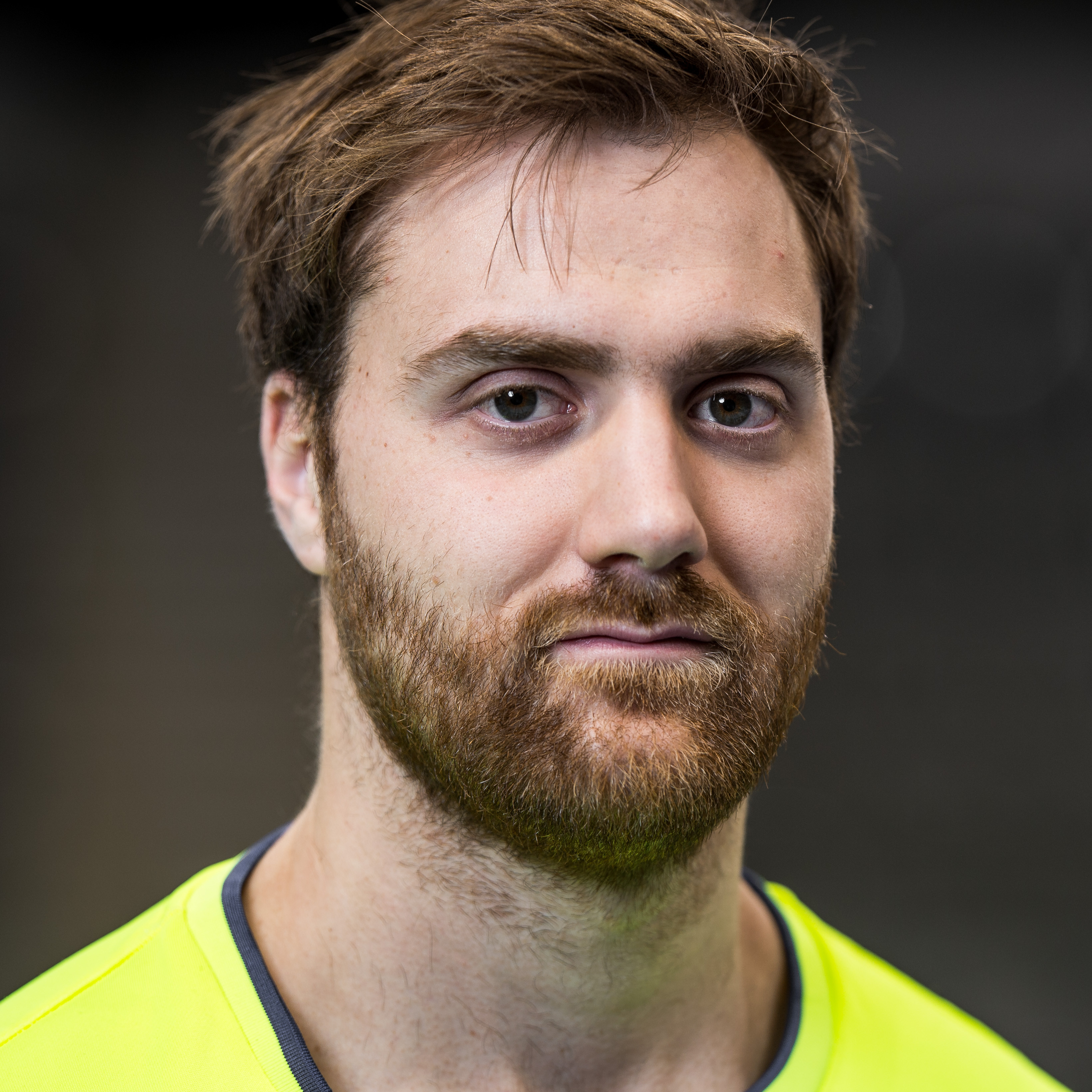
- Wolff in 2018

Personal information
- Nickname: Andi
- Nationality: German
- Born: 3 March 1991 (age 35) Euskirchen, Germany
- Height: 1.98 m (6 ft 6 in)

Sport
- Sport: Handball
- Position: Goalkeeper
- Current club: THW Kiel
- Number: 33

Youth career
- Years: Team
- 1995–2004: SG Ollheim/Straßfeld
- 2004–2007: HSG Rheinbach-Wormersdorf
- 2007: TV Kirchzell

Senior clubs
- Years: Team
- 2009–2013: TV Kirchzell
- 2009–2013: TV Großwallstadt
- 2013–2016: HSG Wetzlar
- 2016–2019: THW Kiel
- 2019–2024: Industria Kielce
- 2024–: THW Kiel
National team
Years	Team	Apps	(Gls)
2013–	Germany	198	(16)
Medal record
Olympic Games
Silver medal – second place	2024 Paris	Team
Bronze medal – third place	2016 Rio de Janeiro	Team
European Championship
Gold medal – first place	2016 Poland
Silver medal – second place	2026 Denmark/Norway/Sweden
- Updated on 8 November 2026

Andreas Wolff (born 3 March 1991) is a German handball player who plays as a goalkeeper for THW Kiel and the German national team.

== Club career ==
Wolff played until the age of 15 at SG Ollheim/Straßfeld, before switching to HSG Rheinbach-Wormersdorf. His senior breakthrough came for TV Kirchzell.

Wolff's first major club was TV Großwallstadt, where he played until 2013 before switching to HSG Wetzlar. In 2016 he switched to the German top club THW Kiel. He played here for three years, where he played 102 matches, won the DHB-Pokal twice and won the EHF European League in 2019.

In 2019 he switched to Polish Handball and Vive Kielce. Here he won four Polish championships and was in the EHF Champions League final in 2022, where Kielce lost on penalties to FC Barcelona Handbol and in 2023. where they lost to SC Magdeburg. In 2019 he was appointed the captain of the team.

== International career ==
Wolff debuted for the German B-team in 2013 and only a year later he was on the A team. He was part of the German National team, that won the 2016 European Men's Handball Championship in Poland. In this tournament he was selected as the best goalkeeper of the tournament.

At the 2016 Olympics he won Bronze medal with the German team, for which he was awarded the Silberne Lorbeerblatt.

At the 2018 European Championship, he finished 9th with Germany.

At the 2020 Olympics he once again represented Germany. Germany went out in the quarterfinals to Egypt.

At the 2022 European Championship he played the first game of the tournament, but then had to leave the tournament, due to a positive COVID-19 test.

A year later he played at the 2023 World Championship, where Germany finished 5th. With 112 savess he had the most saves in the tournament. With a save percentage of 37%, 8 saved penalty throws and 3 'player of the match' awards, he was named as part of the tournament all star team.

At the 2024 European Championship he finished 4th with Germany, and was once again named in the all star team. Later the same year he won silver medals at the 2024 Olympics, losing to Denmark in the final.

At the 2025 World Championship he finished 6th with Germany.

At the 2026 European Men's Handball Championship he won silver medals, losing to Denmark in the final. He was also selected for the tournament all-star team as the goalkeeper and had the most saves during the tournament of any goalkeeper.

== Achievements ==
- EHF Cup:
  - Gold: 2019
- EHF Champions League:
  - Silver: 2022, 2023
- IHF Super Globe:
  - Bronze: 2022
- Handball-Bundesliga:
  - Silver: 2019
- DHB-Pokal:
  - Gold: 2017, 2019, 2025
- DHB-Supercup:
  - Silver: 2017
- Polish Superliga:
  - Gold: 2020, 2021, 2022, 2023
  - Silver: 2024
- Polish Cup:
  - Gold: 2021
  - Silver: 2022, 2023, 2024

== Individual awards ==
- All-Star Goalkeeper of the European Championship: 2016, 2024, 2026
- All-Star Goalkeeper of the World Championship: 2023
