= 2026 European Men's Handball Championship =

17th edition of the EHF European Men's Handball Championship

2026 EHF European Men's Handball Championship
EM i håndbold for mænd 2026 (in Danish) EM i håndball for menn 2026 (in Norwegian) EM i handboll för herrar 2026 (in Swedish)
- Pure Greatness

Tournament details
- Host countries: Denmark; Norway; Sweden
- Venues: 4 (in 4 host cities)
- Dates: 15 January – 1 February
- Teams: 24 (from 1 confederation)

Final positions
- Champions: Denmark (3rd title)
- Runners-up: Germany
- Third place: Croatia
- Fourth place: Iceland

Tournament statistics
- Matches played: 65
- Goals scored: 4,046 (62.25 per match)
- Attendance: 529,793 (8,151 per match)
- Top scorers: (Denmark) Mathias Gidsel (68 goals)

Awards
- Best player: (Denmark) Mathias Gidsel

The 2026 EHF European Men's Handball Championship, commonly referred to as the EHF Euro 2026, was the 17th edition of the EHF European Men's Handball Championship, the biennial international men's handball championship of Europe organized by EHF. It was co-hosted by Denmark, Norway and Sweden from 15 January to 1 February 2026, marking the second time the event was held in three countries, after 2020. The final was held in Herning, Denmark.

24 teams participated for the fourth time. Qualification took place in January 2023 to May 2025. The three co-hosts qualified automatically, alongside the defending champions, France. Italy returns after a 28-year absence.

This tournament acts as a qualifier for the 2027 World Men's Handball Championship in Germany and 2028 edition in Portugal, Spain and Switzerland.

France were the defending champions, having beaten Denmark in the 2024 final in Cologne, but they couldn't defend their title after being eliminated in the main round and placed 7th. Co-host Denmark won their third title and first in 14 years after defeating Germany in the final. Croatia captured the bronze medal after defeating Iceland who appeared in the medal race after 16 years. Co-hosts Norway and Sweden finished 9th and 6th. Portugal and Faroe Islands achieved their best results, placing 5th and 13th respectively.

Denmark's Mathias Gidsel won the MVP award, after scoring 68 goals, which is a tournament record at any European Championship.

== Bid process ==
=== Bids ===
On 11 May 2021 it was announced that the following nations sent in an official expression of interest:

- Denmark, Norway & Sweden
- Switzerland (withdrew) in October 2021. Switzerland merged with the Iberian bid for 2028.

=== Host selection ===
As only the Scandinavian bid remained it was unanimously selected at the 14th EHF Extraordinary Congress on 20 November 2021. This marks the second time the event is held in three countries, after 2020. This is Denmark's second (after 2014), Norway's third (after 2008 and 2020) and Sweden's third (after 2002 and 2020) time hosting.

== Preparations ==
- Site visits in Denmark and Sweden took place in September 2024.
- As of April 2025, the EHF stated that preparations were going smoothly.
- On 18 September 2025, the three co-hosts were joining forces on common sustainability concept called Pure Promise.
- On 13 November 2025, Swedish hotel company, Scandic, was announced as a national supplier for Norway.
- On 21 November 2025, it was announced that Harald V will watch Norway's opening game against Ukraine.
- On 19 December 2025, Gumpen Gruppen became a car supplier for the championship in Norway.
- Herning would offer free transport to and from the Jyske Bank Boxen for the tournament.

=== Tickets ===
- On 5 November 2024, tickets in Sweden were released.
- Denmark and Norway's were put on sale on 14 February 2025.
- More tickets were released on 29 October 2025.
- More tickets in Denmark were available for purchase.
- On 17 November 2025, the Swedish Handball Federation stated that tickets were selling fast.

=== Sponsors ===
==== Official partners ====
- Evoke plc
- Gorenje
- Grundfos
- Harting
- Lidl
- Liqui Moly
- Strauss
- Trivago
- Würth

== Qualification ==
Map of qualifiers for the 2026 European Men's Handball Championship: Team qualified for Men's EHF Euro 2026 Team failed to qualify Team banned from competition Did not enter

36 teams registered for participation and competed for 20 places at the final tournament. After the qualification round 1, the remaining 32 teams take part in qualification round 2, where each team is drawn into eights groups of four. The top-two placed teams in each group qualified for the final tournament, alongside the four best-ranked third-placed teams, not counting the matches against fourth-placed teams. The draw took place on 21 March 2024 in Copenhagen, Denmark. Round 2 started in November 2025 and ended in May 2026.

Of the 24 qualifiers, 22 return from the previous edition. Italy qualified for only their second appearance, with their first being back in 1998. Ukraine come back having missed out in 2024.

Of the non-qualifiers, Bosnia and Herzegovina miss out for the first time since 2018, while 2024 debutants, Greece also failed to qualify.

The lowest ranked team from the EHF rankings to qualify was Ukraine, ranked 30th. The highest ranked team to not qualify was Greece, ranked 22nd.

=== Qualified teams ===
Team	Qualification method	Date of qualification	Appearance(s)				Previous best performance (Note: Bold text indicates they hosted that edition.)	Rank
Team	Qualification method	Date of qualification	Total	First	Last	Streak	Previous best performance	Rank
Denmark	Host nation	20 November 2021	16th	1994	2024	14	Champions (2008, 2012)	1
Norway	Host nation	20 November 2021	12th	2000	2024	11	Third place (2020)	8
Sweden	Host nation	20 November 2021	16th	1994	2024	10	Champions (1994, 1998, 2000, 2002, 2022)	4
France	Defending champions	26 January 2024	17th	1994	2024	17	Champions (2006, 2010, 2014, 2024)	2
Iceland	Top two in Group 3	15 March 2025	14th	2000	2024	14	Third place (2010)	9
Croatia	Top two in Group 5	15 March 2025	17th	1994	2024	17	Runners-up (2008, 2010, 2020)	5
Slovenia	Top two in Group 1	15 March 2025	15th	1994	2024	6	Runners-up (2004)	11
Portugal	Top two in Group 8	16 March 2025	9th	1994	2024	4	Sixth place (2020)	7
Hungary	Top two in Group 2	7 May 2025	15th	1994	2024	12	Fifth place (2024)	6
Czech Republic	Top two in Group 5	7 May 2025	13th	1996	2024	5	Sixth place (1996)	17
Germany	Top two in Group 7	7 May 2025	16th	1994	2024	6	Champions (2004, 2016)	3
Georgia	Top two in Group 3	8 May 2025	2nd	2024	2024	2	18th place (2024)	26
Montenegro	Top two in Group 2	8 May 2025	8th	2008	2024	7	Eleventh place (2022)	14
Spain	Top two in Group 4	8 May 2025	17th	1994	2024	17	Champions (2018, 2020)	10
Faroe Islands	Top two in Group 6	8 May 2025	2nd	2024	2024	2	20th place (2024)	21
Netherlands	Top two in Group 6	8 May 2025	4th	2020	2024	4	Tenth place (2022)	12
Austria	Top two in Group 7	11 May 2025	7th	2010	2024	5	Eighth place (2020, 2024)	13
North Macedonia	Top two in Group 1	11 May 2025	9th	1998	2024	8	Fifth place (2012)	19
Poland	Top two in Group 8	11 May 2025	12th	2002	2024	4	Fourth place (2010)	16
Serbia	Top two in Group 4	11 May 2025	13th	1996	2024	9	Runners-up (2012)	18
Italy	Four best third place teams	11 May 2025	2nd	1998		1	Eleventh place (1998)	20
Romania	Four best third place teams	11 May 2025	4th	1994	2024	2	Ninth place (1996)	25
Switzerland	Four best third place teams	11 May 2025	6th	2002	2024	2	Twelfth place (2004)	15
Ukraine	Four best third place teams	11 May 2025	8th	2000	2022	1	Eleventh place (2002)	30

== Venues ==
A first draft of the venues was proposed in August 2023. The tournament will be played across four venues in four cities: one in Denmark (Herning, Groups A and B), one in Norway (Bærum, Groups C and D), and two in Sweden (Malmö and Kristianstad, Groups E and F). The main round will take place in Herning and Malmö, with the former organising the final weekend. The following proposed cities in the bid didn't make the final cut: Aarhus and Copenhagen in Denmark, and Bergen, Stavanger and Trondheim in Norway. In regards to Norway, Oslo was chosen over Trondheim, after negotiations with Trondheim fell through due to financial reasons.

In September 2024, one team per venue was selected. Denmark will play in Herning (Group B), Norway in Bærum (Group C) and Sweden in Malmö (Group E). If they qualify, Germany will play in Herning (Group A), the Faroe Islands in Bærum (Group D) and Iceland in Kristianstad (Group F). The arena in Kristianstad is renovated with new seats being put in by June 2025.

=== Overview of venues ===
- The Jyske Bank Boxen in Herning is the biggest arena in Denmark, seating 15,000. The venue has hosted several handball championships, including: the European Men's Handball Championship in 2014, European Women's Handball Championship in 2010 and 2020, World Men's Handball Championship in 2019 and 2025 and World Women's Handball Championship in 2015 and 2023. It has also held the IIHF World Championship in 2018 and 2025.
- The Malmö Arena and Malmö was built in 2008. The venue has experience in hosting handball tournaments, previously hosting two World Men's Handball Championships, in 2011 and 2023. In addition to handball, the arena has hosted the Eurovision Song Contest twice in 2013 and 2024, as well as the 2024 Men's World Floorball Championships.
- The Unity Arena in Bærum will host Norway's games for the tournament. It has recently organised the 2025 World Men's Handball Championship as the main host. Outside of sport, it hosted Eurovision in 2010 and the various concerts.
- The Kristianstad Arena in Kristianstad is the smallest arena used for the tournament with a capacity of 4,500. The 2011 World Men's Handball Championship and 2023 World Men's Handball Championship have taken place here.

Distribution of tournament
Herning will host preliminary, main and knockout round games.
Malmö will host preliminary and main round games.
Bærum and Kristianstad will host preliminary round games.

Herning, Denmark	2026 European Men's Handball Championship is located in Southwest Scandinavia	Malmö, Sweden
Jyske Bank Boxen	2026 European Men's Handball Championship is located in Southwest Scandinavia	Malmö Arena
Capacity: 15,000	2026 European Men's Handball Championship is located in Southwest Scandinavia	Capacity: 11,800
Bærum, Norway	2026 European Men's Handball Championship is located in Southwest Scandinavia	Kristianstad, Sweden
Unity Arena	2026 European Men's Handball Championship is located in Southwest Scandinavia	Kristianstad Arena
Capacity: 9,000	2026 European Men's Handball Championship is located in Southwest Scandinavia	Capacity: 4,500

Tournament venues information
Venue	Rounds	Games
(Denmark) Jyske Bank Boxen	Group A and B, Main round Group I, Semifinals and Final	29
(Sweden) Malmö Arena	Group E and Main round Group II	18
(Norway) Unity Arena	Group C and D	12
(Sweden) Kristianstad Arena	Group F	6

== Draw ==
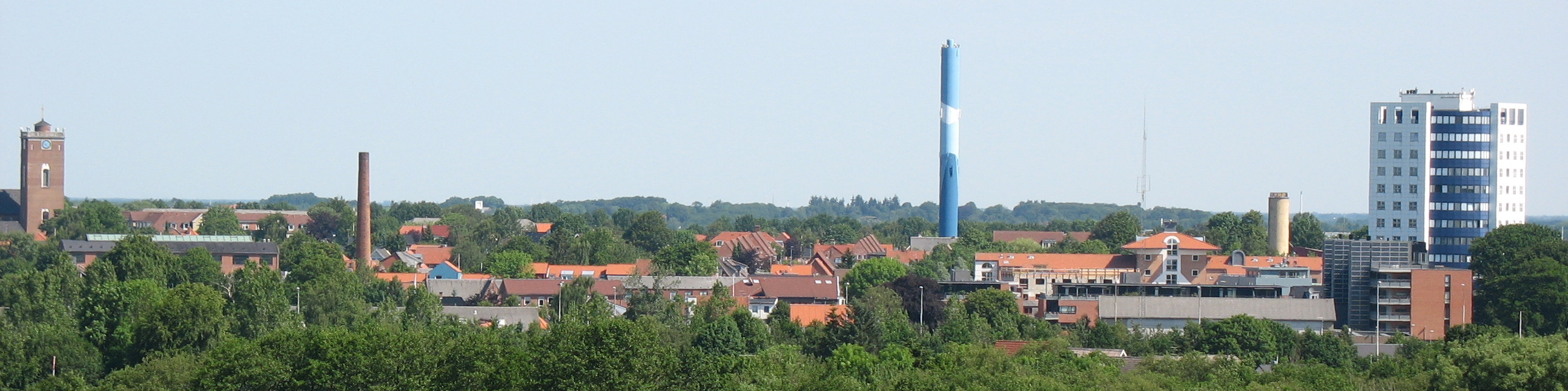
Herning hosted the draw.

The draw took place on 15 May 2025 at 18:00 CEST at the Teatersaalen in Herning, Denmark. The draw was hosted by Danish journalist, Mette Cornelius. Danish international, Simon Pytlick, French national team player, Hugo Descat, Swedish player Andreas Nilsson and former Norwegian left back Kristian Kjelling were the guests and assisted with the draw. The draw started with, in order, pots 1, 2, 3 and 4 being drawn, with each team selected then allocated into the first available group alphabetically.

=== Chosen teams ===
On 2 September 2024, the three co-hosts were allowed to choose a nation to be drawn in their country if they qualified. Denmark chose Germany, Norway picked Faroe Islands while Sweden selected Iceland.

- 2026 European Men's Handball Championship – Draw
- Draw Live Stream

Team	Group
Germany	A
Denmark	B
Norway	C
Faroe Islands	D
Sweden	E
Iceland	F

=== Seeding ===
The seedings were announced on 12 May 2025.

Pot 1	Pot 2	Pot 3	Pot 4
France; Denmark; Sweden; Germany; Hungary; Slovenia	Portugal; Norway; Iceland; Croatia; Spain; Faroe Islands	Austria; Netherlands; Montenegro; Czech Republic; Poland; North Macedonia	Georgia; Serbia; Switzerland; Romania; Ukraine; Italy

=== Draw results ===
Group A in Herning
Pos	Team
A1	Germany
A2	Spain
A3	Austria
A4	Serbia

Group B in Herning
Pos	Team
B1	Denmark (H)
B2	Portugal
B3	North Macedonia
B4	Romania

Group C in Bærum
Pos	Team
C1	France
C2	Norway (H)
C3	Czech Republic
C4	Ukraine

Group D in Bærum
Pos	Team
D1	Slovenia
D2	Faroe Islands
D3	Montenegro
D4	Switzerland

Group E in Malmö
Pos	Team
E1	Sweden (H)
E2	Croatia
E3	Netherlands
E4	Georgia

Group F in Kristianstad
Pos	Team
F1	Hungary
F2	Iceland
F3	Poland
F4	Italy

=== Schedule ===
Schedule
Round	Matchday	Date
Preliminary round	Matchday 1	15–17 January 2026
Preliminary round	Matchday 2	17–19 January 2026
Preliminary round	Matchday 3	19–21 January 2026
Main round	Matchday 4	22–23 January 2026
Main round	Matchday 5	24–25 January 2026
Main round	Matchday 6	26–27 January 2026
Main round	Matchday 7	28 January 2026
Knockout stage	Semi-finals	30 January 2026
Knockout stage	Final	1 February 2026

== Referees ==
The 18 referee pairs were selected on 8 October 2025. However, on 22 December 2025, the Czech referee pair Václav Horáček and Jiří Novotný withdrew their nomination due to recent injury, getting replaced by the Serbian pair Marko Boričić and Dejan Marković. On 10 January 2026, the EHF withdrew the nomination of the pair from North Macedonia Slave Nikolov and Gjorgji Načevski, due to suspected manipulation of a video recording of their Multistage Fitness Test, no other pair was nominated instead, leaving the tournament with only 17 pairs.

Country	Referees	Assigned games
Bosnia and Herzegovina	Amar Konjičanin	Preliminary round: North Macedonia vs Portugal (Group B); Preliminary round: Germany vs Spain (Group A); Main round: France vs Portugal (Group I); Main round: Slovenia vs Croatia (Group II); Main round: Denmark vs Norway (Group I)
Bosnia and Herzegovina	Dino Konjičanin	Preliminary round: North Macedonia vs Portugal (Group B); Preliminary round: Germany vs Spain (Group A); Main round: France vs Portugal (Group I); Main round: Slovenia vs Croatia (Group II); Main round: Denmark vs Norway (Group I)
Denmark	Mads Hansen	Preliminary round: Slovenia vs Montenegro (Group D); Preliminary round: Italy vs Hungary (Group F); Preliminary round: Netherlands vs Georgia (Group E); Main round: Slovenia vs Hungary (Group II); Main round: Spain vs Portugal (Group I)
Denmark	Jesper Madsen	Preliminary round: Slovenia vs Montenegro (Group D); Preliminary round: Italy vs Hungary (Group F); Preliminary round: Netherlands vs Georgia (Group E); Main round: Slovenia vs Hungary (Group II); Main round: Spain vs Portugal (Group I)
Germany	Robert Schulze	Preliminary round: Hungary vs Poland (Group F); Preliminary round: Netherlands vs Croatia (Group E); Main round: Switzerland vs Croatia (Group II); Main round: Sweden vs Hungary (Group E)
Germany	Tobias Tönnies	Preliminary round: Hungary vs Poland (Group F); Preliminary round: Netherlands vs Croatia (Group E); Main round: Switzerland vs Croatia (Group II); Main round: Sweden vs Hungary (Group E)
Hungary	Ádám Bíró	Preliminary round: Norway vs Ukraine (Group C); Preliminary round: Serbia vs Germany (Group A)
Hungary	Olivér Kiss	Preliminary round: Norway vs Ukraine (Group C); Preliminary round: Serbia vs Germany (Group A)
Iceland	Jónas Elíasson	Preliminary round: Spain vs Serbia (Group A); Preliminary round: Czech Republic vs Ukraine (Group C); Main round: Germany vs Norway (Group I); Fifth place game: Portugal vs Sweden
Iceland	Anton Pálsson	Preliminary round: Spain vs Serbia (Group A); Preliminary round: Czech Republic vs Ukraine (Group C); Main round: Germany vs Norway (Group I); Fifth place game: Portugal vs Sweden
Lithuania	Tomas Barysas	Preliminary round: France vs Czech Republic (Group C); Preliminary round: Romania vs Denmark (Group B)
Lithuania	Povilas Petrušis	Preliminary round: France vs Czech Republic (Group C); Preliminary round: Romania vs Denmark (Group B)
Moldova	Igor Covalciuc	Preliminary round: Denmark vs North Macedonia (Group B); Preliminary round: France vs Norway (Group C)
Moldova	Alexei Covalciuc	Preliminary round: Denmark vs North Macedonia (Group B); Preliminary round: France vs Norway (Group C)
Montenegro	Ivan Pavićević	Preliminary round: Germany vs Austria (Group A); Preliminary round: Czech Republic vs Norway (Group C); Preliminary round: Denmark vs Portugal (Group B); Main round: Spain vs Norway (Group I); Main round: Germany vs Denmark (Group I); Final: Denmark vs Germany
Montenegro	Miloš Ražnatović	Preliminary round: Germany vs Austria (Group A); Preliminary round: Czech Republic vs Norway (Group C); Preliminary round: Denmark vs Portugal (Group B); Main round: Spain vs Norway (Group I); Main round: Germany vs Denmark (Group I); Final: Denmark vs Germany
North Macedonia	Dimitar Mitrevski	Preliminary round: Sweden vs Netherlands (Group E); Preliminary round: Hungary vs Iceland (Group F)
North Macedonia	Blagojche Todorovski	Preliminary round: Sweden vs Netherlands (Group E); Preliminary round: Hungary vs Iceland (Group F)
Norway	Lars Jørum	Preliminary round: Switzerland vs Slovenia (Group D); Preliminary round: Poland vs Italy (Group F); Main round: Iceland vs Sweden (Group II); Main round: Croatia vs Hungary (Group II); Semifinal: Denmark vs Iceland
Norway	Håvard Kleven	Preliminary round: Switzerland vs Slovenia (Group D); Preliminary round: Poland vs Italy (Group F); Main round: Iceland vs Sweden (Group II); Main round: Croatia vs Hungary (Group II); Semifinal: Denmark vs Iceland
Portugal	Daniel Martins	Preliminary round: Montenegro vs Faroe Islands (Group D); Preliminary round: Sweden vs Croatia (Group E); Main round: Switzerland vs Hungary (Group II); Main round: Slovenia vs Iceland (Group II)
Portugal	Roberto Martins	Preliminary round: Montenegro vs Faroe Islands (Group D); Preliminary round: Sweden vs Croatia (Group E); Main round: Switzerland vs Hungary (Group II); Main round: Slovenia vs Iceland (Group II)
Serbia	Marko Boričić	Preliminary round: Poland vs Iceland (Group F); Preliminary round: Georgia vs Sweden (Group E); Main round: Spain vs Denmark (Group I); Main round: Germany vs France (Group I)
Serbia	Dejan Marković	Preliminary round: Poland vs Iceland (Group F); Preliminary round: Georgia vs Sweden (Group E); Main round: Spain vs Denmark (Group I); Main round: Germany vs France (Group I)
Slovenia	Bojan Lah	Preliminary round: Austria vs Spain (Group A); Preliminary round: North Macedonia vs Romania (Group B); Main round: France vs Denmark (Group I); Main round: Portugal vs Norway (Group I); Semifinal: Germany vs Croatia
Slovenia	David Sok	Preliminary round: Austria vs Spain (Group A); Preliminary round: North Macedonia vs Romania (Group B); Main round: France vs Denmark (Group I); Main round: Portugal vs Norway (Group I); Semifinal: Germany vs Croatia
Spain	Andreú Marin	Preliminary round: Iceland vs Italy (Group F); Preliminary round: Slovenia vs Faroe Islands (Group D); Main round: Slovenia vs Sweden (Group II); Main round: Switzerland vs Iceland (Group II); Third place game: Iceland vs Croatia
Spain	Ignacio García	Preliminary round: Iceland vs Italy (Group F); Preliminary round: Slovenia vs Faroe Islands (Group D); Main round: Slovenia vs Sweden (Group II); Main round: Switzerland vs Iceland (Group II); Third place game: Iceland vs Croatia
Spain	Javier Álvarez	Preliminary round: Poland vs Iceland (Group F); Preliminary round: Georgia vs Sweden (Group E); Main round: Spain vs Denmark (Group I); Main round: Germany vs France (Group I)
Spain	Ion Bustamante	Preliminary round: Poland vs Iceland (Group F); Preliminary round: Georgia vs Sweden (Group E); Main round: Spain vs Denmark (Group I); Main round: Germany vs France (Group I)
Sweden	Mirza Kurtagic	Preliminary round: Portugal vs Romania (Group B); Preliminary round: Austria vs Serbia (Group A); Main round: Germany vs Portugal (Group I); Main round: Spain vs France (Group I)
Sweden	Mattias Wetterwik	Preliminary round: Portugal vs Romania (Group B); Preliminary round: Austria vs Serbia (Group A); Main round: Germany vs Portugal (Group I); Main round: Spain vs France (Group I)
Turkey	Kürşad Erdoğan	Preliminary round: Faroe Islands vs Switzerland (Group D); Preliminary round: Ukraine vs France (Group C)
Turkey	İbrahim Özdeniz	Preliminary round: Faroe Islands vs Switzerland (Group D); Preliminary round: Ukraine vs France (Group C)

== Squads ==
Each team consists of up to 20 players, of whom 16 may be fielded for each match. If an injury occurred during the tournament, the competing teams would be able to replace the injured player with someone who was in the provisional squad. A maximum of six replacements would be allowed during the tournament.

== Preliminary round ==
Map of final standings for the 2026 European Men's Handball Championship: Winner Runner-up Third place / Fourth place Fifth place Sixth place / Main round Preliminary round

The schedule was released on 10 November 2024.

=== Tiebreakers ===
In the group stages (preliminary and main rounds), teams are ranked according to points (2 points for a win, 1 point for a draw, 0 points for a loss). If two or more teams have the same number of points, the ranking will be determined as follows:

During the round matches

1. Superior goal difference from all group matches;
2. Higher number of goals scored in all group matches;
3. Alphabetical order.

After completion of the round matches

1. Highest number of points in matches between the teams directly involved;
2. Superior goal difference in matches between the teams directly involved;
3. Highest number of goals scored in matches between the teams directly involved;
4. Superior goal difference in all matches of the group;
5. Highest number of plus goals in all matches of the group;

If the ranking of one of these teams is determined, the above criteria are consecutively followed until the ranking of all teams is determined. If no ranking can be determined, a decision shall be obtained by EHF through drawing of lots.

All times are local (UTC+1).

=== Group A ===
Pos	Team	Pld	W	D	L	GF	GA	GD	Pts	Qualification
1	Germany	3	2	0	1	91	89	+2	4 (Note: Germany 34–32 Spain)	Main round
2	Spain	3	2	0	1	91	86	+5	4	Main round
3	Austria	3	1	0	2	78	85	−7	2 (Note: Austria 26–25 Serbia)	
4	Serbia	3	1	0	2	82	82	0	2	

Source: EHF
Rules for classification: 1) points; 2) head-to-head points; 3) head-to-head goal difference; 4) head-to-head number of goals scored; 5) goal difference.
Notes:

15 January 2026; 18:00	Spain	29–27	Serbia	Jyske Bank Boxen, Herning; Attendance: 5,237; Referees: Elíasson, Pálsson (ISL)
15 January 2026; 18:00	Tarrafeta 6	(19–15)	Kojadinović 6	Jyske Bank Boxen, Herning; Attendance: 5,237; Referees: Elíasson, Pálsson (ISL)
15 January 2026; 18:00	2× (suspension)	Report	1× (yellow card) 5× (suspension)	Jyske Bank Boxen, Herning; Attendance: 5,237; Referees: Elíasson, Pálsson (ISL)

15 January 2026; 20:30	Germany	30–27	Austria	Jyske Bank Boxen, Herning; Attendance: 5,820; Referees: Pavićević, Ražnatović (MNE)
15 January 2026; 20:30	Golla 7	(12–8)	Frimmel 9	Jyske Bank Boxen, Herning; Attendance: 5,820; Referees: Pavićević, Ražnatović (MNE)
15 January 2026; 20:30	1× (yellow card) 3× (suspension)	Report	1× (yellow card) 5× (suspension)	Jyske Bank Boxen, Herning; Attendance: 5,820; Referees: Pavićević, Ražnatović (MNE)

17 January 2026; 18:00	Austria	25–30	Spain	Jyske Bank Boxen, Herning; Attendance: 8,260; Referees: Lah, Sok (SLO)
17 January 2026; 18:00	Wagner 6	(12–19)	Garciandia, Gómez 4	Jyske Bank Boxen, Herning; Attendance: 8,260; Referees: Lah, Sok (SLO)
17 January 2026; 18:00	4× (suspension)	Report	5× (suspension)	Jyske Bank Boxen, Herning; Attendance: 8,260; Referees: Lah, Sok (SLO)

17 January 2026; 20:30	Serbia	30–27	Germany	Jyske Bank Boxen, Herning; Attendance: 9,130; Referees: Bíró, Kiss (HUN)
17 January 2026; 20:30	Kojadinović, Vorkapić 6	(13–17)	Schluroff, Uščins 6	Jyske Bank Boxen, Herning; Attendance: 9,130; Referees: Bíró, Kiss (HUN)
17 January 2026; 20:30	1× (yellow card) 3× (suspension)	Report	2× (suspension)	Jyske Bank Boxen, Herning; Attendance: 9,130; Referees: Bíró, Kiss (HUN)

19 January 2026; 18:00	Austria	26–25	Serbia	Jyske Bank Boxen, Herning; Attendance: 7,830; Referees: Kurtagic, Wetterwik (SWE)
19 January 2026; 18:00	Wagner 6	(12–13)	N. Ilić 6	Jyske Bank Boxen, Herning; Attendance: 7,830; Referees: Kurtagic, Wetterwik (SWE)
19 January 2026; 18:00	2× (yellow card)	Report	4× (suspension)	Jyske Bank Boxen, Herning; Attendance: 7,830; Referees: Kurtagic, Wetterwik (SWE)

19 January 2026; 20:30	Germany	34–32	Spain	Jyske Bank Boxen, Herning; Attendance: 9,526; Referees: Konjičanin, Konjičanin (BIH)
19 January 2026; 20:30	Uščins 8	(17–15)	Gurri 7	Jyske Bank Boxen, Herning; Attendance: 9,526; Referees: Konjičanin, Konjičanin (BIH)
19 January 2026; 20:30	3× (suspension)	Report	3× (suspension)	Jyske Bank Boxen, Herning; Attendance: 9,526; Referees: Konjičanin, Konjičanin (BIH)

=== Group B ===
Pos	Team	Pld	W	D	L	GF	GA	GD	Pts	Qualification
1	Portugal	3	2	1	0	100	92	+8	5	Main round
2	Denmark	3	2	0	1	104	79	+25	4	Main round
3	North Macedonia	3	1	1	1	77	88	−11	3	
4	Romania	3	0	0	3	81	103	−22	0	

Source: EHF
Rules for classification: 1) points; 2) head-to-head points; 3) head-to-head goal difference; 4) head-to-head number of goals scored; 5) goal difference.

16 January 2026; 18:00	Portugal	40–34	Romania	Jyske Bank Boxen, Herning; Attendance: 10,908; Referees: Kurtagic, Wetterwik (SWE)
16 January 2026; 18:00	F. Costa 9	(23–15)	Stanciuc 8	Jyske Bank Boxen, Herning; Attendance: 10,908; Referees: Kurtagic, Wetterwik (SWE)
16 January 2026; 18:00	1× (yellow card) 2× (suspension) 1× (red card)	Report	1× (yellow card) 1× (suspension)	Jyske Bank Boxen, Herning; Attendance: 10,908; Referees: Kurtagic, Wetterwik (SWE)

16 January 2026; 20:30	Denmark	36–24	North Macedonia	Jyske Bank Boxen, Herning; Attendance: 15,000; Referees: Covalciuc, Covalciuc (MDA)
16 January 2026; 20:30	Pytlick 9	(17–12)	Serafimov 6	Jyske Bank Boxen, Herning; Attendance: 15,000; Referees: Covalciuc, Covalciuc (MDA)
16 January 2026; 20:30	2× (suspension)	Report	3× (suspension)	Jyske Bank Boxen, Herning; Attendance: 15,000; Referees: Covalciuc, Covalciuc (MDA)

18 January 2026; 18:00	North Macedonia	29–29	Portugal	Jyske Bank Boxen, Herning; Attendance: 11,438; Referees: Konjičanin, Konjičanin (BIH)
18 January 2026; 18:00	Kuzmanovski 15	(13–15)	F. Costa 11	Jyske Bank Boxen, Herning; Attendance: 11,438; Referees: Konjičanin, Konjičanin (BIH)
18 January 2026; 18:00	1× (yellow card) 4× (suspension) 1× (red card)	Report	4× (suspension)	Jyske Bank Boxen, Herning; Attendance: 11,438; Referees: Konjičanin, Konjičanin (BIH)

18 January 2026; 20:30	Romania	24–39	Denmark	Jyske Bank Boxen, Herning; Attendance: 14,535; Referees: Barysas, Petrušis (LTU)
18 January 2026; 20:30	three players 4	(17–22)	Gidsel 9	Jyske Bank Boxen, Herning; Attendance: 14,535; Referees: Barysas, Petrušis (LTU)
18 January 2026; 20:30	4× (suspension)	Report		Jyske Bank Boxen, Herning; Attendance: 14,535; Referees: Barysas, Petrušis (LTU)

20 January 2026; 18:00	North Macedonia	24–23	Romania	Jyske Bank Boxen, Herning; Attendance: 10,872; Referees: Lah, Sok (SLO)
20 January 2026; 18:00	Kuzmanovski 9	(13–9)	Nistor 8	Jyske Bank Boxen, Herning; Attendance: 10,872; Referees: Lah, Sok (SLO)
20 January 2026; 18:00	2× (yellow card) 4× (suspension) 1× (red card)	Report	1× (yellow card) 3× (suspension) 1× (red card)	Jyske Bank Boxen, Herning; Attendance: 10,872; Referees: Lah, Sok (SLO)

20 January 2026; 20:30	Denmark	29–31	Portugal	Jyske Bank Boxen, Herning; Attendance: 15,000; Referees: Pavićević, Ražnatović (MNE)
20 January 2026; 20:30	Gidsel 8	(11–12)	F. Costa, M. Costa 9	Jyske Bank Boxen, Herning; Attendance: 15,000; Referees: Pavićević, Ražnatović (MNE)
20 January 2026; 20:30	3× (yellow card)	Report	2× (suspension) 1× (red card)	Jyske Bank Boxen, Herning; Attendance: 15,000; Referees: Pavićević, Ražnatović (MNE)

=== Group C ===
Pos	Team	Pld	W	D	L	GF	GA	GD	Pts	Qualification
1	France	3	3	0	0	126	88	+38	6	Main round
2	Norway	3	2	0	1	102	85	+17	4	Main round
3	Czech Republic	3	1	0	2	91	100	−9	2	
4	Ukraine	3	0	0	3	77	123	−46	0	

Source: EHF
Rules for classification: 1) points; 2) head-to-head points; 3) head-to-head goal difference; 4) head-to-head number of goals scored; 5) goal difference.

15 January 2026; 18:00	France	42–28	Czech Republic	Unity Arena, Bærum; Attendance: 4,163; Referees: Barysas, Petrušis (LTU)
15 January 2026; 18:00	three players 6	(20–14)	Široky, Solák 6	Unity Arena, Bærum; Attendance: 4,163; Referees: Barysas, Petrušis (LTU)
15 January 2026; 18:00	1× (suspension)	Report	5× (suspension) 1× (red card)	Unity Arena, Bærum; Attendance: 4,163; Referees: Barysas, Petrušis (LTU)

15 January 2026; 20:30	Norway	39–22	Ukraine	Unity Arena, Bærum; Attendance: 6,371; Referees: Bíró, Kiss (HUN)
15 January 2026; 20:30	Anderson, Blonz 7	(19–11)	Turchenko 5	Unity Arena, Bærum; Attendance: 6,371; Referees: Bíró, Kiss (HUN)
15 January 2026; 20:30	1× (suspension)	Report	2× (suspension)	Unity Arena, Bærum; Attendance: 6,371; Referees: Bíró, Kiss (HUN)

17 January 2026; 18:00	Ukraine	26–46	France	Unity Arena, Bærum; Attendance: 6,255; Referees: Erdoğan, Özdeniz (TUR)
17 January 2026; 18:00	Artemenko 8	(12–24)	three players 6	Unity Arena, Bærum; Attendance: 6,255; Referees: Erdoğan, Özdeniz (TUR)
17 January 2026; 18:00		Report	1× (yellow card)	Unity Arena, Bærum; Attendance: 6,255; Referees: Erdoğan, Özdeniz (TUR)

17 January 2026; 20:30	Czech Republic	25–29	Norway	Unity Arena, Bærum; Attendance: 8,034; Referees: Pavićević, Ražnatović (MNE)
17 January 2026; 20:30	Josef 7	(16–16)	Pedersen 9	Unity Arena, Bærum; Attendance: 8,034; Referees: Pavićević, Ražnatović (MNE)
17 January 2026; 20:30	2× (yellow card) 3× (suspension)	Report	1× (yellow card) 2× (suspension)	Unity Arena, Bærum; Attendance: 8,034; Referees: Pavićević, Ražnatović (MNE)

19 January 2026; 18:00	Czech Republic	38–29	Ukraine	Unity Arena, Bærum; Attendance: 5,025; Referees: Elíasson, Pálsson (ISL)
19 January 2026; 18:00	Josef 15	(17–14)	Turchenko 9	Unity Arena, Bærum; Attendance: 5,025; Referees: Elíasson, Pálsson (ISL)
19 January 2026; 18:00	1× (yellow card) 3× (suspension) 1× (red card)	Report	4× (suspension)	Unity Arena, Bærum; Attendance: 5,025; Referees: Elíasson, Pálsson (ISL)

19 January 2026; 20:30	France	38–34	Norway	Unity Arena, Bærum; Attendance: 9,000; Referees: Covalciuc, Covalciuc (MDA)
19 January 2026; 20:30	Descat 6	(20–17)	Sagosen 9	Unity Arena, Bærum; Attendance: 9,000; Referees: Covalciuc, Covalciuc (MDA)
19 January 2026; 20:30	2× (suspension)	Report	1× (yellow card) 2× (suspension)	Unity Arena, Bærum; Attendance: 9,000; Referees: Covalciuc, Covalciuc (MDA)

=== Group D ===
Pos	Team	Pld	W	D	L	GF	GA	GD	Pts	Qualification
1	Slovenia	3	3	0	0	109	102	+7	6	Main round
2	Switzerland	3	1	1	1	106	92	+14	3 (Note: Faroe Islands 28–28 Switzerland)	Main round
3	Faroe Islands	3	1	1	1	92	82	+10	3	
4	Montenegro	3	0	0	3	90	121	−31	0	

Source: EHF
Rules for classification: 1) points; 2) head-to-head points; 3) head-to-head goal difference; 4) head-to-head number of goals scored; 5) goal difference.
Notes:

16 January 2026; 18:00	Slovenia	41–40	Montenegro	Unity Arena, Bærum; Attendance: 2,915; Referees: Hansen, Madsen (DEN)
16 January 2026; 18:00	Makuc, Novak 9	(19–17)	B. Vujović 11	Unity Arena, Bærum; Attendance: 2,915; Referees: Hansen, Madsen (DEN)
16 January 2026; 18:00	3× (yellow card) 4× (suspension)	Report	1× (yellow card) 4× (suspension)	Unity Arena, Bærum; Attendance: 2,915; Referees: Hansen, Madsen (DEN)

16 January 2026; 20:30	Faroe Islands	28–28	Switzerland	Unity Arena, Bærum; Attendance: 7,216; Referees: Erdoğan, Özdeniz (TUR)
16 January 2026; 20:30	E. á Skipagøtu 9	(15–13)	Leopold 7	Unity Arena, Bærum; Attendance: 7,216; Referees: Erdoğan, Özdeniz (TUR)
16 January 2026; 20:30	2× (yellow card) 2× (suspension)	Report	1× (yellow card) 4× (suspension)	Unity Arena, Bærum; Attendance: 7,216; Referees: Erdoğan, Özdeniz (TUR)

18 January 2026; 18:00	Montenegro	24–37	Faroe Islands	Unity Arena, Bærum; Attendance: 8,555; Referees: Martins, Martins (POR)
18 January 2026; 18:00	four players 3	(12–19)	three players 9	Unity Arena, Bærum; Attendance: 8,555; Referees: Martins, Martins (POR)
18 January 2026; 18:00	2× (suspension) 1× (red card)	Report	1× (suspension)	Unity Arena, Bærum; Attendance: 8,555; Referees: Martins, Martins (POR)

18 January 2026; 20:30	Switzerland	35–38	Slovenia	Unity Arena, Bærum; Attendance: 2,026; Referees: Jørum, Kleven (NOR)
18 January 2026; 20:30	Leopold, Steenaerts 6	(20–14)	three players 6	Unity Arena, Bærum; Attendance: 2,026; Referees: Jørum, Kleven (NOR)
18 January 2026; 20:30	1× (yellow card) 4× (suspension)	Report	1× (yellow card) 4× (suspension) 1× (red card)	Unity Arena, Bærum; Attendance: 2,026; Referees: Jørum, Kleven (NOR)

20 January 2026; 18:00	Montenegro	26–43	Switzerland	Unity Arena, Bærum; Attendance: 2,579; Referees: Álvarez, Bustamante (ESP)
20 January 2026; 18:00	B. Vujović 9	(16–22)	Rubin, Sigrist 10	Unity Arena, Bærum; Attendance: 2,579; Referees: Álvarez, Bustamante (ESP)
20 January 2026; 18:00	1× (yellow card)	Report		Unity Arena, Bærum; Attendance: 2,579; Referees: Álvarez, Bustamante (ESP)

20 January 2026; 20:30	Slovenia	30–27	Faroe Islands	Unity Arena, Bærum; Attendance: 6,670; Referees: Marin, García (ESP)
20 January 2026; 20:30	Makuc 10	(16–15)	E. á Skipagøtu 9	Unity Arena, Bærum; Attendance: 6,670; Referees: Marin, García (ESP)
20 January 2026; 20:30	1× (yellow card) 4× (suspension) 1× (red card)	Report	1× (yellow card) 5× (suspension)	Unity Arena, Bærum; Attendance: 6,670; Referees: Marin, García (ESP)

=== Group E ===
Pos	Team	Pld	W	D	L	GF	GA	GD	Pts	Qualification
1	Sweden	3	3	0	0	107	85	+22	6	Main round
2	Croatia	3	2	0	1	92	91	+1	4	Main round
3	Netherlands	3	1	0	2	91	97	−6	2	
4	Georgia	3	0	0	3	84	101	−17	0	

Source: EHF
Rules for classification: 1) points; 2) head-to-head points; 3) head-to-head goal difference; 4) head-to-head number of goals scored; 5) goal difference.

17 January 2026; 18:00	Croatia	32–29	Georgia	Malmö Arena, Malmö; Attendance: 8,675; Referees: Álvarez, Bustamante (ESP)
17 January 2026; 18:00	Šoštarić 8	(15–14)	Tskhovrebadze 7	Malmö Arena, Malmö; Attendance: 8,675; Referees: Álvarez, Bustamante (ESP)
17 January 2026; 18:00	4× (suspension)	Report	1× (yellow card) 3× (suspension)	Malmö Arena, Malmö; Attendance: 8,675; Referees: Álvarez, Bustamante (ESP)

17 January 2026; 20:30	Sweden	36–31	Netherlands	Malmö Arena, Malmö; Attendance: 11,800; Referees: Mitrevski, Todorovski (MKD)
17 January 2026; 20:30	Claar 8	(16–12)	Ten Velde 9	Malmö Arena, Malmö; Attendance: 11,800; Referees: Mitrevski, Todorovski (MKD)
17 January 2026; 20:30	6× (suspension) 1× (red card)	Report	2× (yellow card) 4× (suspension) 1× (red card)	Malmö Arena, Malmö; Attendance: 11,800; Referees: Mitrevski, Todorovski (MKD)

19 January 2026; 18:00	Netherlands	29–35	Croatia	Malmö Arena, Malmö; Attendance: 7,215; Referees: Schulze, Tönnies (GER)
19 January 2026; 18:00	Ten Velde 8	(13–15)	Martinović 9	Malmö Arena, Malmö; Attendance: 7,215; Referees: Schulze, Tönnies (GER)
19 January 2026; 18:00	1× (yellow card) 2× (suspension)	Report	1× (yellow card) 2× (suspension)	Malmö Arena, Malmö; Attendance: 7,215; Referees: Schulze, Tönnies (GER)

19 January 2026; 20:30	Georgia	29–38	Sweden	Malmö Arena, Malmö; Attendance: 9,870; Referees: Boričić, Marković (SRB)
19 January 2026; 20:30	Tskhovrebadze 11	(15–20)	Claar, Roganović 6	Malmö Arena, Malmö; Attendance: 9,870; Referees: Boričić, Marković (SRB)
19 January 2026; 20:30	1× (yellow card) 2× (suspension)	Report	3× (suspension)	Malmö Arena, Malmö; Attendance: 9,870; Referees: Boričić, Marković (SRB)

21 January 2026; 18:00	Netherlands	31–26	Georgia	Malmö Arena, Malmö; Attendance: 6,835; Referees: Hansen, Madsen (DEN)
21 January 2026; 18:00	Stavast 8	(18–15)	Tskhovrebadze 11	Malmö Arena, Malmö; Attendance: 6,835; Referees: Hansen, Madsen (DEN)
21 January 2026; 18:00	1× (yellow card) 1× (suspension)	Report	1× (yellow card) 1× (suspension)	Malmö Arena, Malmö; Attendance: 6,835; Referees: Hansen, Madsen (DEN)

21 January 2026; 20:30	Sweden	33–25	Croatia	Malmö Arena, Malmö; Attendance: 10,247; Referees: Martins, Martins (POR)
21 January 2026; 20:30	Johansson, Roganović 5	(17–13)	Srna 7	Malmö Arena, Malmö; Attendance: 10,247; Referees: Martins, Martins (POR)
21 January 2026; 20:30	2× (suspension)	Report	1× (yellow card) 6× (suspension)	Malmö Arena, Malmö; Attendance: 10,247; Referees: Martins, Martins (POR)

=== Group F ===
Pos	Team	Pld	W	D	L	GF	GA	GD	Pts	Qualification
1	Iceland	3	3	0	0	94	72	+22	6	Main round
2	Hungary	3	2	0	1	84	71	+13	4	Main round
3	Italy	3	1	0	2	81	99	−18	2	
4	Poland	3	0	0	3	72	89	−17	0	

Source: EHF
Rules for classification: 1) points; 2) head-to-head points; 3) head-to-head goal difference; 4) head-to-head number of goals scored; 5) goal difference.

16 January 2026; 18:00	Iceland	39–26	Italy	Kristianstad Arena, Kristianstad; Attendance: 3,202; Referees: Marín, García (ESP)
16 January 2026; 18:00	Smárason 8	(21–12)	Prantner 6	Kristianstad Arena, Kristianstad; Attendance: 3,202; Referees: Marín, García (ESP)
16 January 2026; 18:00	1× (yellow card) 4× (suspension)	Report	2× (yellow card) 2× (suspension) 1× (red card)	Kristianstad Arena, Kristianstad; Attendance: 3,202; Referees: Marín, García (ESP)

16 January 2026; 20:30	Hungary	29–21	Poland	Kristianstad Arena, Kristianstad; Attendance: 3,212; Referees: Schulze, Tönnies (GER)
16 January 2026; 20:30	Bodó 5	(14–10)	three players 3	Kristianstad Arena, Kristianstad; Attendance: 3,212; Referees: Schulze, Tönnies (GER)
16 January 2026; 20:30	2× (suspension)	Report	1× (suspension) 1× (red card)	Kristianstad Arena, Kristianstad; Attendance: 3,212; Referees: Schulze, Tönnies (GER)

18 January 2026; 18:00	Poland	23–31	Iceland	Kristianstad Arena, Kristianstad; Attendance: 3,625; Referees: Boričić, Marković (SRB)
18 January 2026; 18:00	Olejniczak 5	(10–13)	Þorkelsson 6	Kristianstad Arena, Kristianstad; Attendance: 3,625; Referees: Boričić, Marković (SRB)
18 January 2026; 18:00	1× (yellow card) 1× (suspension)	Report	1× (yellow card) 3× (suspension)	Kristianstad Arena, Kristianstad; Attendance: 3,625; Referees: Boričić, Marković (SRB)

18 January 2026; 20:30	Italy	26–32	Hungary	Kristianstad Arena, Kristianstad; Attendance: 2,817; Referees: Hansen, Madsen (DEN)
18 January 2026; 20:30	Mengon 6	(13–14)	Imre 9	Kristianstad Arena, Kristianstad; Attendance: 2,817; Referees: Hansen, Madsen (DEN)
18 January 2026; 20:30	1× (yellow card) 7× (suspension)	Report	4× (suspension)	Kristianstad Arena, Kristianstad; Attendance: 2,817; Referees: Hansen, Madsen (DEN)

20 January 2026; 18:00	Poland	28–29	Italy	Kristianstad Arena, Kristianstad; Attendance: 2,044; Referees: Jørum, Kleven (NOR)
20 January 2026; 18:00	Czapliński 12	(13–15)	Mengon 7	Kristianstad Arena, Kristianstad; Attendance: 2,044; Referees: Jørum, Kleven (NOR)
20 January 2026; 18:00	1× (yellow card) 5× (suspension) 1× (red card)	Report	1× (yellow card) 6× (suspension)	Kristianstad Arena, Kristianstad; Attendance: 2,044; Referees: Jørum, Kleven (NOR)

20 January 2026; 20:30	Hungary	23–24	Iceland	Kristianstad Arena, Kristianstad; Attendance: 3,150; Referees: Mitrevski, Todorovski (MKD)
20 January 2026; 20:30	Imre 7	(14–14)	G. Kristjánsson 7	Kristianstad Arena, Kristianstad; Attendance: 3,150; Referees: Mitrevski, Todorovski (MKD)
20 January 2026; 20:30	2× (yellow card) 3× (suspension) 1× (red card)	Report	2× (yellow card) 2× (suspension) 1× (red card)	Kristianstad Arena, Kristianstad; Attendance: 3,150; Referees: Mitrevski, Todorovski (MKD)

== Main round ==
Points and goals gained in the preliminary group against teams that advance were transferred to the main round.

=== Group I ===
Pos	Team	Pld	W	D	L	GF	GA	GD	Pts	Qualification
1	Denmark (H)	5	4	0	1	166	141	+25	8 (Note: Denmark 31–26 Germany)	Semifinals
2	Germany	5	4	0	1	160	155	+5	8	Semifinals
3	Portugal	5	2	1	2	169	169	0	5	Fifth place game
4	France	5	2	0	3	179	178	+1	4	
5	Norway (H)	5	1	1	3	156	175	−19	3	
6	Spain	5	1	0	4	160	172	−12	2	

Source: EHF
Rules for classification: 1) points; 2) head-to-head points; 3) head-to-head goal difference; 4) head-to-head number of goals scored; 5) goal difference.
(H) Hosts
Notes:

22 January 2026; 15:30	Germany	32–30	Portugal	Jyske Bank Boxen, Herning; Attendance: 6,145; Referees: Kurtagic, Wetterwik (SWE)
22 January 2026; 15:30	Schluroff 7	(11–11)	F. Costa 10	Jyske Bank Boxen, Herning; Attendance: 6,145; Referees: Kurtagic, Wetterwik (SWE)
22 January 2026; 15:30	1× (yellow card) 3× (suspension) 1× (red card)	Report	2× (yellow card) 4× (suspension)	Jyske Bank Boxen, Herning; Attendance: 6,145; Referees: Kurtagic, Wetterwik (SWE)

22 January 2026; 18:00	Spain	34–35	Norway	Jyske Bank Boxen, Herning; Attendance: 10,483; Referees: Pavićević, Ražnatović (MNE)
22 January 2026; 18:00	Gómez 8	(16–16)	Pedersen 11	Jyske Bank Boxen, Herning; Attendance: 10,483; Referees: Pavićević, Ražnatović (MNE)
22 January 2026; 18:00	3× (suspension)	Report	1× (yellow card) 4× (suspension)	Jyske Bank Boxen, Herning; Attendance: 10,483; Referees: Pavićević, Ražnatović (MNE)

22 January 2026; 20:30	France	29–32	Denmark	Jyske Bank Boxen, Herning; Attendance: 13,260; Referees: Lah, Sok (SLO)
22 January 2026; 20:30	Minne 9	(12–11)	Gidsel 9	Jyske Bank Boxen, Herning; Attendance: 13,260; Referees: Lah, Sok (SLO)
22 January 2026; 20:30	2× (suspension)	Report	2× (yellow card) 4× (suspension)	Jyske Bank Boxen, Herning; Attendance: 13,260; Referees: Lah, Sok (SLO)

24 January 2026; 15:30	France	46–38	Portugal	Jyske Bank Boxen, Herning; Attendance: 11,807; Referees: Konjičanin, Konjičanin (BIH)
24 January 2026; 15:30	Mem 8	(28–15)	five players 5	Jyske Bank Boxen, Herning; Attendance: 11,807; Referees: Konjičanin, Konjičanin (BIH)
24 January 2026; 15:30	2× (suspension)	Report	2× (suspension)	Jyske Bank Boxen, Herning; Attendance: 11,807; Referees: Konjičanin, Konjičanin (BIH)

24 January 2026; 18:00	Spain	31–36	Denmark	Jyske Bank Boxen, Herning; Attendance: 15,000; Referees: Boričić, Marković (SRB)
24 January 2026; 18:00	Fis 9	(14–16)	Jakobsen 8	Jyske Bank Boxen, Herning; Attendance: 15,000; Referees: Boričić, Marković (SRB)
24 January 2026; 18:00	1× (yellow card) 6× (suspension)	Report	1× (yellow card) 3× (suspension)	Jyske Bank Boxen, Herning; Attendance: 15,000; Referees: Boričić, Marković (SRB)

24 January 2026; 20:30	Germany	30–28	Norway	Jyske Bank Boxen, Herning; Attendance: 10,117; Referees: Elíasson, Pálsson (ISL)
24 January 2026; 20:30	Grgić 7	(15–17)	three players 5	Jyske Bank Boxen, Herning; Attendance: 10,117; Referees: Elíasson, Pálsson (ISL)
24 January 2026; 20:30	3× (suspension)	Report	1× (yellow card) 3× (suspension)	Jyske Bank Boxen, Herning; Attendance: 10,117; Referees: Elíasson, Pálsson (ISL)

26 January 2026; 15:30	Portugal	35–35	Norway	Jyske Bank Boxen, Herning; Attendance: 5,727; Referees: Lah, Sok (SLO)
26 January 2026; 15:30	Frade 11	(17–18)	Pedersen 10	Jyske Bank Boxen, Herning; Attendance: 5,727; Referees: Lah, Sok (SLO)
26 January 2026; 15:30	4× (suspension)	Report	1× (yellow card) 3× (suspension)	Jyske Bank Boxen, Herning; Attendance: 5,727; Referees: Lah, Sok (SLO)

26 January 2026; 18:00	Spain	36–32	France	Jyske Bank Boxen, Herning; Attendance: 10,933; Referees: Kurtagic, Wetterwik (SWE)
26 January 2026; 18:00	Barrufet 10	(20–14)	Minne 7	Jyske Bank Boxen, Herning; Attendance: 10,933; Referees: Kurtagic, Wetterwik (SWE)
26 January 2026; 18:00	1× (yellow card) 2× (suspension)	Report	3× (suspension)	Jyske Bank Boxen, Herning; Attendance: 10,933; Referees: Kurtagic, Wetterwik (SWE)

26 January 2026; 20:30	Denmark	31–26	Germany	Jyske Bank Boxen, Herning; Attendance: 15,000; Referees: Pavićević, Ražnatović (MNE)
26 January 2026; 20:30	Gidsel, Pytlick 8	(13–12)	Uščins 6	Jyske Bank Boxen, Herning; Attendance: 15,000; Referees: Pavićević, Ražnatović (MNE)
26 January 2026; 20:30	2× (suspension)	Report	1× (yellow card) 5× (suspension)	Jyske Bank Boxen, Herning; Attendance: 15,000; Referees: Pavićević, Ražnatović (MNE)

28 January 2026; 15:30	Spain	27–35	Portugal	Jyske Bank Boxen, Herning; Attendance: 6,267; Referees: Hansen, Madsen (DEN)
28 January 2026; 15:30	Gómez, Gurri 6	(12–16)	F. Costa 7	Jyske Bank Boxen, Herning; Attendance: 6,267; Referees: Hansen, Madsen (DEN)
28 January 2026; 15:30	3× (suspension)	Report	3× (suspension)	Jyske Bank Boxen, Herning; Attendance: 6,267; Referees: Hansen, Madsen (DEN)

28 January 2026; 18:00	Germany	38–34	France	Jyske Bank Boxen, Herning; Attendance: 10,850; Referees: Boričić, Marković (SRB)
28 January 2026; 18:00	Knorr 10	(19–15)	Mem 11	Jyske Bank Boxen, Herning; Attendance: 10,850; Referees: Boričić, Marković (SRB)
28 January 2026; 18:00	2× (suspension)	Report	1× (suspension)	Jyske Bank Boxen, Herning; Attendance: 10,850; Referees: Boričić, Marković (SRB)

28 January 2026; 20:30	Denmark	38–24	Norway	Jyske Bank Boxen, Herning; Attendance: 15,000; Referees: Konjičanin, Konjičanin (BIH)
28 January 2026; 20:30	Gidsel, Jakobsen 7	(19–16)	Grøndahl, Pedersen 6	Jyske Bank Boxen, Herning; Attendance: 15,000; Referees: Konjičanin, Konjičanin (BIH)
28 January 2026; 20:30	1× (yellow card) 3× (suspension)	Report	2× (suspension)	Jyske Bank Boxen, Herning; Attendance: 15,000; Referees: Konjičanin, Konjičanin (BIH)

=== Group II ===
Pos	Team	Pld	W	D	L	GF	GA	GD	Pts	Qualification
1	Croatia	5	4	0	1	139	136	+3	8	Semifinals
2	Iceland	5	3	1	1	165	149	+16	7 (Note: Iceland 35–27 Sweden)	Semifinals
3	Sweden (H)	5	3	1	1	161	144	+17	7	Fifth place game
4	Slovenia	5	2	0	3	160	170	−10	4	
5	Hungary	5	0	2	3	141	147	−6	2 (Note: Switzerland 29–29 Hungary)	
6	Switzerland	5	0	2	3	147	167	−20	2	

Source: EHF
Rules for classification: 1) points; 2) head-to-head points; 3) head-to-head goal difference; 4) head-to-head number of goals scored; 5) goal difference.
(H) Hosts
Notes:

23 January 2026; 15:30	Iceland	29–30	Croatia	Malmö Arena, Malmö; Attendance: 5,036; Referees: Álvarez, Bustamante (ESP)
23 January 2026; 15:30	Magnússon, Ríkharðsson 8	(15–19)	Maraš 7	Malmö Arena, Malmö; Attendance: 5,036; Referees: Álvarez, Bustamante (ESP)
23 January 2026; 15:30	2× (suspension)	Report	1× (yellow card) 6× (suspension)	Malmö Arena, Malmö; Attendance: 5,036; Referees: Álvarez, Bustamante (ESP)

23 January 2026; 18:00	Switzerland	29–29	Hungary	Malmö Arena, Malmö; Attendance: 4,327; Referees: Martins, Martins (POR)
23 January 2026; 18:00	Rubin 7	(20–14)	Rosta 5	Malmö Arena, Malmö; Attendance: 4,327; Referees: Martins, Martins (POR)
23 January 2026; 18:00	1× (yellow card) 4× (suspension)	Report	2× (suspension)	Malmö Arena, Malmö; Attendance: 4,327; Referees: Martins, Martins (POR)

23 January 2026; 20:30	Slovenia	31–35	Sweden	Malmö Arena, Malmö; Attendance: 7,745; Referees: Marin, García (ESP)
23 January 2026; 20:30	Makuc 8	(15–13)	Sandell 7	Malmö Arena, Malmö; Attendance: 7,745; Referees: Marin, García (ESP)
23 January 2026; 20:30	1× (yellow card) 6× (suspension)	Report	2× (yellow card) 2× (suspension)	Malmö Arena, Malmö; Attendance: 7,745; Referees: Marin, García (ESP)

25 January 2026; 15:30	Slovenia	35–32	Hungary	Malmö Arena, Malmö; Attendance: 5,015; Referees: Hansen, Madsen (DEN)
25 January 2026; 15:30	Janc 10	(15–17)	Imre 8	Malmö Arena, Malmö; Attendance: 5,015; Referees: Hansen, Madsen (DEN)
25 January 2026; 15:30	5× (suspension)	Report	1× (yellow card) 3× (suspension)	Malmö Arena, Malmö; Attendance: 5,015; Referees: Hansen, Madsen (DEN)

25 January 2026; 18:00	Iceland	35–27	Sweden	Malmö Arena, Malmö; Attendance: 9,643; Referees: Jørum, Kleven (NOR)
25 January 2026; 18:00	V. Kristjánsson 11	(18–12)	Lagergren 5	Malmö Arena, Malmö; Attendance: 9,643; Referees: Jørum, Kleven (NOR)
25 January 2026; 18:00	1× (yellow card) 3× (suspension)	Report	4× (suspension)	Malmö Arena, Malmö; Attendance: 9,643; Referees: Jørum, Kleven (NOR)

25 January 2026; 20:30	Switzerland	24–28	Croatia	Malmö Arena, Malmö; Attendance: 5,480; Referees: Schulze, Tönnies (GER)
25 January 2026; 20:30	Zehnder 6	(11–13)	Martinović, Srna 5	Malmö Arena, Malmö; Attendance: 5,480; Referees: Schulze, Tönnies (GER)
25 January 2026; 20:30	1× (yellow card) 5× (suspension)	Report	1× (yellow card) 3× (suspension)	Malmö Arena, Malmö; Attendance: 5,480; Referees: Schulze, Tönnies (GER)

27 January 2026; 15:30	Switzerland	38–38	Iceland	Malmö Arena, Malmö; Attendance: 3,470; Referees: Marin, García (ESP)
27 January 2026; 15:30	Leopold 7	(19–19)	Þorkelsson, Viðarsson 8	Malmö Arena, Malmö; Attendance: 3,470; Referees: Marin, García (ESP)
27 January 2026; 15:30	1× (yellow card) 6× (suspension)	Report	1× (yellow card) 3× (suspension)	Malmö Arena, Malmö; Attendance: 3,470; Referees: Marin, García (ESP)

27 January 2026; 18:00	Slovenia	25–29	Croatia	Malmö Arena, Malmö; Attendance: 4,465; Referees: Konjičanin, Konjičanin (BIH)
27 January 2026; 18:00	Makuc, Novak 6	(11–14)	Lučin 7	Malmö Arena, Malmö; Attendance: 4,465; Referees: Konjičanin, Konjičanin (BIH)
27 January 2026; 18:00	1× (yellow card) 2× (suspension) 1× (red card)	Report	5× (suspension)	Malmö Arena, Malmö; Attendance: 4,465; Referees: Konjičanin, Konjičanin (BIH)

27 January 2026; 20:30	Sweden	32–32	Hungary	Malmö Arena, Malmö; Attendance: 7,342; Referees: Schulze, Tönnies (GER)
27 January 2026; 20:30	Claar 10	(14–16)	Imre, Rosta 8	Malmö Arena, Malmö; Attendance: 7,342; Referees: Schulze, Tönnies (GER)
27 January 2026; 20:30	2× (suspension)	Report	1× (yellow card) 4× (suspension)	Malmö Arena, Malmö; Attendance: 7,342; Referees: Schulze, Tönnies (GER)

28 January 2026; 15:30	Slovenia	31–39	Iceland	Malmö Arena, Malmö; Attendance: 2,871; Referees: Martins, Martins (POR)
28 January 2026; 15:30	Novak 9	(16–18)	Viðarsson 8	Malmö Arena, Malmö; Attendance: 2,871; Referees: Martins, Martins (POR)
28 January 2026; 15:30	1× (yellow card) 6× (suspension)	Report	1× (yellow card) 5× (suspension)	Malmö Arena, Malmö; Attendance: 2,871; Referees: Martins, Martins (POR)

28 January 2026; 18:00	Croatia	27–25	Hungary	Malmö Arena, Malmö; Attendance: 5,964; Referees: Jørum, Kleven (NOR)
28 January 2026; 18:00	four players 4	(13–15)	Imre 7	Malmö Arena, Malmö; Attendance: 5,964; Referees: Jørum, Kleven (NOR)
28 January 2026; 18:00	1× (yellow card) 3× (suspension)	Report	4× (suspension)	Malmö Arena, Malmö; Attendance: 5,964; Referees: Jørum, Kleven (NOR)

28 January 2026; 20:30	Switzerland	21–34	Sweden	Malmö Arena, Malmö; Attendance: 7,689; Referees: Alvarez, Bustamante (ESP)
28 January 2026; 20:30	Rubin 6	(12–14)	Johansson 7	Malmö Arena, Malmö; Attendance: 7,689; Referees: Alvarez, Bustamante (ESP)
28 January 2026; 20:30	2× (suspension)	Report	1× (yellow card) 1× (suspension)	Malmö Arena, Malmö; Attendance: 7,689; Referees: Alvarez, Bustamante (ESP)

== Knockout stage ==
=== Bracket ===
Semi-finals
30 January
Denmark	31
Iceland	28
30 January
Croatia	28
Germany	31

Final
1 February
Denmark	34
Germany	27
Third place
1 February
Iceland	33
Croatia	34

=== Semifinals ===
30 January 2026; 17:45	Croatia	28–31	Germany	Jyske Bank Boxen, Herning; Attendance: 15,000; Referees: Lah, Sok (SLO)
30 January 2026; 17:45	Lučin 6	(15–17)	Zerbe 6	Jyske Bank Boxen, Herning; Attendance: 15,000; Referees: Lah, Sok (SLO)
30 January 2026; 17:45	1× (yellow card) 1× (suspension)	Report	2× (yellow card)	Jyske Bank Boxen, Herning; Attendance: 15,000; Referees: Lah, Sok (SLO)

30 January 2026; 20:30	Denmark	31–28	Iceland	Jyske Bank Boxen, Herning; Attendance: 15,000; Referees: Jørum, Kleven (NOR)
30 January 2026; 20:30	Gidsel 7	(14–13)	Smárason 8	Jyske Bank Boxen, Herning; Attendance: 15,000; Referees: Jørum, Kleven (NOR)
30 January 2026; 20:30	4× (suspension)	Report	1× (yellow card) 3× (suspension)	Jyske Bank Boxen, Herning; Attendance: 15,000; Referees: Jørum, Kleven (NOR)

=== Fifth place game ===
30 January 2026; 15:00	Portugal	36–35	Sweden	Jyske Bank Boxen, Herning; Attendance: 5,100; Referees: Elíasson, Pálsson (ISL)
30 January 2026; 15:00	M. Costa 9	(16–16)	Sandell 8	Jyske Bank Boxen, Herning; Attendance: 5,100; Referees: Elíasson, Pálsson (ISL)
30 January 2026; 15:00	1× (yellow card) 2× (suspension)	Report	1× (yellow card) 3× (suspension)	Jyske Bank Boxen, Herning; Attendance: 5,100; Referees: Elíasson, Pálsson (ISL)

=== Third place game ===
1 February 2026; 15:15	Iceland	33–34	Croatia	Jyske Bank Boxen, Herning; Attendance: 15,000; Referees: Marin, García (ESP)
1 February 2026; 15:15	Magnússon 12	(14–17)	Lučin 9	Jyske Bank Boxen, Herning; Attendance: 15,000; Referees: Marin, García (ESP)
1 February 2026; 15:15	3× (yellow card) 7× (suspension) 1× (red card)	Report	1× (yellow card) 5× (suspension)	Jyske Bank Boxen, Herning; Attendance: 15,000; Referees: Marin, García (ESP)

=== Final ===
1 February 2026; 18:00	Denmark	34–27	Germany	Jyske Bank Boxen, Herning; Attendance: 15,000; Referees: Pavićević, Ražnatović (MNE)
1 February 2026; 18:00	Pytlick 8	(18–16)	three players 5	Jyske Bank Boxen, Herning; Attendance: 15,000; Referees: Pavićević, Ražnatović (MNE)
1 February 2026; 18:00	3× (suspension)	Report	1× (yellow card) 3× (suspension) 2× (red card)	Jyske Bank Boxen, Herning; Attendance: 15,000; Referees: Pavićević, Ražnatović (MNE)

== Rankings ==
=== Final ranking ===
The teams ranked fourth in each group after the completion of the preliminary round matches will be ranked 19 to 24, while teams ranked third in each group after the completion of the preliminary round matches will be ranked 13 to 18 according to the number of points won in the preliminary round. Places seven and eight will be attributed to the two teams ranked fourth in the main round groups, places nine and ten to the two teams ranked fifth in the main round groups, places eleven and twelve to the two teams ranked sixth in the main round groups according to the number of points won by the respective teams after completion of the main round matches. Places one to six will be decided by play–off or knock–out.

==== Best results ====
Team	Previous	New
Portugal	6th (2020)	5th
Faroe Islands	20th (2024)	13th

===== Ranking table =====
Pos	Team	Pld	W	D	L	GF	GA	GD	Pts	Final result
1	Denmark (H)	9	8	0	1	306	244	+62	16	Champions
2	Germany	9	6	0	3	275	274	+1	12	Runners-up
3	Croatia	9	7	0	2	268	258	+10	14	Third place
4	Iceland	9	5	1	3	296	263	+33	11	Fourth place
5	Portugal	8	4	2	2	274	267	+7	10	Fifth place game
6	Sweden (H)	8	5	1	2	270	240	+30	11	Fifth place game
7	France	7	4	0	3	267	232	+35	8	Fourth in main round
8	Slovenia	7	4	0	3	231	237	−6	8	Fourth in main round
9	Norway (H)	7	3	1	3	224	222	+2	7	Fifth in main round
10	Hungary	7	2	2	3	202	194	+8	6	Fifth in main round
11	Spain	7	3	0	4	219	224	−5	6	Sixth in main round
12	Switzerland	7	1	3	3	218	221	−3	5	Sixth in main round
13	Faroe Islands	3	1	1	1	92	82	+10	3	Third in preliminary round
14	North Macedonia	3	1	1	1	77	88	−11	3	Third in preliminary round
15	Netherlands	3	1	0	2	91	97	−6	2	Third in preliminary round
16	Austria	3	1	0	2	78	85	−7	2	Third in preliminary round
17	Czech Republic	3	1	0	2	91	100	−9	2	Third in preliminary round
18	Italy	3	1	0	2	81	99	−18	2	Third in preliminary round
19	Serbia	3	1	0	2	82	82	0	2	Fourth in preliminary round
20	Georgia	3	0	0	3	84	101	−17	0	Fourth in preliminary round
21	Poland	3	0	0	3	72	89	−17	0	Fourth in preliminary round
22	Romania	3	0	0	3	81	103	−22	0	Fourth in preliminary round
23	Montenegro	3	0	0	3	90	121	−31	0	Fourth in preliminary round
24	Ukraine	3	0	0	3	77	123	−46	0	Fourth in preliminary round

Source: EHF
Rules for classification: 1) points; 2) head-to-head points; 3) head-to-head goal difference; 4) head-to-head number of goals scored; 5) goal difference.
(H) Hosts

=== Qualification table ===
Rank	Team	Qualification	
Rank	Team	WC	EC
1st place, gold medalist(s)	Denmark	Q	Q
2nd place, silver medalist(s)	Germany	Q	q2
3rd place, bronze medalist(s)	Croatia	Q	q2
4	Iceland	Q	q2
5	Portugal	Q	Q
6	Sweden	Q	q2
7	France	q3 (S)	q2
8	Slovenia	q3 (S)	q2
9	Norway	q3 (S)	q2
10	Hungary	q3 (S)	q2
11	Spain	q3 (S)	Q
12	Switzerland	q3 (S)	Q
13	Faroe Islands	q3 (S)	q2
14	North Macedonia	q3 (S)	q2
15	Netherlands	q3 (S)	q2
16	Austria	q3 (S)	q2
17	Czech Republic	q3	q2
18	Italy	q3	q2
19	Serbia	q2 (S)	q2
20	Georgia	q2 (S)	q2
21	Poland	q2 (S)	q2
22	Romania	q2 (S)	q2
23	Montenegro	q2 (S)	q2
24	Ukraine	q2 (S)	q2

Q	Qualified directly to the final tournament
q2	Qualification phase 2
q3	Qualification phase 3
(S)	Seeded

Method of qualification

Qualified for the phase indicated based on this tournament
Qualified for the final tournament as host
Qualified for the final tournament as defending champion

2026 European Men's Handball Championship

Denmark
Third title

Team roster: Niclas Kirkeløkke, Magnus Landin, Emil Jakobsen, Rasmus Lauge, Emil Nielsen, Magnus Saugstrup, Mathias Gidsel, Kevin Møller, Mads Mensah Larsen, Lukas Jørgensen, Jóhan á Plógv Hansen, Lasse Andersson, Emil Bergholt, Simon Hald, Mads Hoxer, Thomas Arnoldsen, Simon Pytlick, Frederik Bo Andersen, Mads Svane Knudsen, Lasse Kjær Møller.
Head Coach: Nikolaj Jacobsen

=== All Star Team ===
The all-star team was announced on 1 February 2026.

Position	Player
Most valuable player	(Denmark) Mathias Gidsel
Best defender	(Portugal) Salvador Salvador
Best young player	(Portugal) Francisco Costa
Goalkeeper	(Germany) Andreas Wolff
Right wing	(Croatia) Mario Šoštarić
Right back	(Portugal) Francisco Costa
Centre back	(Iceland) Gísli Þorgeir Kristjánsson
Left back	(Denmark) Simon Pytlick
Left wing	(Norway) August Pedersen
Pivot	(Germany) Johannes Golla

== Statistics ==
=== Players ===
==== Top goalscorers ====
Rank	Name	Goals	Shots	%
1	(Denmark) Mathias Gidsel	68	95	72
2	(Denmark) Simon Pytlick	64	90	71
3	(Portugal) Francisco Costa	61	94	65
4	(Iceland) Ómar Ingi Magnússon	55	72	76
5	(Norway) August Pedersen	49	62	79
6	(Slovenia) Domen Makuc	48	74	65
7	(Hungary) Bence Imre	46	57	81
8	(Portugal) Martim Costa	44	67	66
9	(Germany) Renārs Uščins	43	75	57
10	(Denmark) Emil Jakobsen	40	54	74
10	(Croatia) Ivan Martinović	40	81	49

==== Top goalkeepers ====
Rank	Name	%	Saves	Shots
1	(Denmark) Kevin Møller	36	33	91
2	(Germany) Andreas Wolff	32	91	285
3	(Faroe Islands) Pauli Jacobsen	31	34	108
3	(Austria) Constantin Möstl	31	29	95
3	(Denmark) Emil Nielsen	31	80	258
3	(Sweden) Andreas Palicka	31	63	206
7	(Norway) Torbjørn Bergerud	30	64	213
7	(Hungary) Kristóf Palasics	30	62	206
9	(Serbia) Dejan Milosavljev	29	31	106
9	(Romania) Mihai Cătălin Popescu	29	12	42
9	(Poland) Jakub Skrzyniarz	29	13	45

=== Teams ===
==== Top scoring ====
Rank	Team	Goals	Shots	%
1	Denmark	306	427	71.7
2	Iceland	296	427	69.3
3	Germany	275	438	62.8
4	Portugal	274	407	67.3
5	Sweden	270	397	68
6	Croatia	268	429	62.5
7	France	267	396	67.4
8	Slovenia	231	328	70.4
9	Norway	224	360	62.2
10	Spain	219	335	65.4

==== Most saves ====
Rank	Team	Saves	Shots	%
1	Germany	114	385	29.61
2	Denmark	113	349	32.38
3	Sweden	91	328	27.74
4	Norway	88	300	29.33
5	Iceland	87	347	25.07
6	Switzerland	78	289	26.99
6	France	78	306	25.49
6	Slovenia	78	309	25.24
6	Croatia	78	320	24.38
10	Hungary	77	259	29.73

=== Fair play ranking ===
Rank	Team	(Penalty) points		(red card) (8 pts)	(suspension) (2 pts)	(yellow card) (1 pt)	MP
Rank	Team	Avg.	Total	(red card) (8 pts)	(suspension) (2 pts)	(yellow card) (1 pt)	MP
1	France	3.4	24		12		7
2	Ukraine	4.0	12		6		3
3	Georgia	5.0	15		6	3	3
4	Norway	5.6	39		17	5	7
5	Denmark	5.8	52		24	4	9
6	Faroe Islands	6.3	19		8	3	3
6	Sweden	6.3	50	1	23	4	8
8	Spain	7.3	51		24	3	7
9	Austria	7.7	23		11	1	3
9	Montenegro	7.7	23	1	7	1	3
11	Switzerland	7.9	55		25	5	7
12	Hungary	8.1	57	1	22	5	7
13	Portugal	8.3	66	2	23	4	8
14	Croatia	8.6	77		35	7	9
15	Germany	8.7	78	3	24	6	9
15	Netherlands	8.7	26	1	7	4	3
15	Romania	8.7	26	1	8	2	3
15	Serbia	8.7	26		12	2	3
19	Iceland	10.1	91	2	32	11	9
20	Poland	10.7	32	2	7	2	3
21	Slovenia	13.4	94	3	31	8	7
22	Czech Republic	13.7	41	2	11	3	3
22	North Macedonia	13.7	41	2	11	3	3
24	Italy	14.0	42	1	15	4	3

=== Discipline ===
The following suspensions were served during the tournament:

Player	Offence(s)	Suspension(s)	Ref
(Poland) Wiktor Jankowski	(red card) in Group F vs Hungary (matchday 1; 16 January)	Group F vs Iceland (matchday 2; 18 January), Group F vs Italy (matchday 3; 20 January)	
(Montenegro) Risto Vujačić	(red card) in Group D vs Faroe Islands (matchday 2; 18 January)	Group D vs Switzerland (matchday 3; 20 January)	
(Portugal) Victor Iturriza	(red card) in Group B vs Denmark (matchday 3; 20 January)	Group I vs Germany (matchday 4; 22 January)	
(Slovenia) Matic Suholežnik	(red card) in Group D vs Faroe Islands (matchday 3; 20 January)	Group II vs Sweden (matchday 4; 23 January), Group II vs Hungary (matchday 5; 25 January)	

=== Player of the match ===
A player of the match (POTM presented by Grundfos for sponsorship reasons) award will be given to the player deemed as playing the best in each match.

Round	Team	Match	Team	Player	Ref
Group A	Spain	29–27	Serbia	(Spain) Ian Tarrafeta	
Group A	Germany	30–27	Austria	(Germany) Johannes Golla	
Group A	Austria	25–30	Spain	(Spain) Sergey Hernández	
Group A	Serbia	30–27	Germany	(Serbia) Stefan Dodić	
Group A	Austria	26–25	Serbia	(Austria) Constantin Möstl	
Group A	Germany	29–25	Spain	(Germany) Renārs Uščins	
Group B	Portugal	40–34	Romania	(Portugal) Francisco Costa	
Group B	Denmark	36–24	North Macedonia	(Denmark) Simon Pytlick	
Group B	North Macedonia	29–29	Portugal	(North Macedonia) Filip Kuzmanovski	
Group B	Romania	24–39	Denmark	(Denmark) Kevin Møller	
Group B	North Macedonia	24–23	Romania	(Romania) Mihai Popescu	
Group B	Denmark	29–31	Portugal	(Denmark) Simon Pytlick	
Group C	France	42–28	Czech Republic	(France) Elohim Prandi	
Group C	Norway	39–22	Ukraine	(Norway) Patrick Helland Anderson	
Group C	Ukraine	26–46	France	(France) Melvyn Richardson	
Group C	Czech Republic	25–29	Norway	(Czech Republic) Tomáš Mrkva	
Group C	Czech Republic	38–29	Ukraine	(Czech Republic) Jonáš Josef	
Group C	France	38–34	Norway	(Norway) Sander Sagosen	
Group D	Slovenia	41–40	Montenegro	(Montenegro) Branko Vujović	
Group D	Faroe Islands	28–28	Switzerland	(Faroe Islands) Elias á Skipagøtu	
Group D	Montenegro	24–37	Faroe Islands	(Faroe Islands) Pauli Jacobsen	
Group D	Switzerland	35–38	Slovenia	(Switzerland) Nikola Portner	
Group D	Montenegro	26–43	Switzerland	(Switzerland) Lenny Rubin	
Group D	Slovenia	30–27	Faroe Islands	(Slovenia) Domen Makuc	
Group E	Croatia	32–29	Georgia	(Croatia) Mario Šoštarić	
Group E	Sweden	36–31	Netherlands	(Sweden) Felix Claar	
Group E	Netherlands	29–35	Croatia	(Croatia) Ivan Martinović	
Group E	Georgia	29–38	Sweden	(Georgia (country)) Giorgi Tskhovrebadze	
Group E	Netherlands	31–26	Georgia	(Netherlands) Reinier Taboada	
Group E	Sweden	33–25	Croatia	(Sweden) Andreas Palicka	
Group F	Iceland	39–26	Italy	(Iceland) Janus Daði Smárason	
Group F	Hungary	29–21	Poland	(Hungary) Kristóf Palasics	
Group F	Poland	23–31	Iceland	(Iceland) Ómar Ingi Magnússon	
Group F	Italy	26–32	Hungary	(Italy) Domenico Ebner	
Group F	Poland	28–29	Italy	(Italy) Simone Mengon	
Group F	Hungary	23–24	Iceland	(Iceland) Viktor Hallgrímsson	
Group I	Germany	32–30	Portugal	(Germany) Andreas Wolff	
Group I	Spain	34–35	Norway	(Norway) August Pedersen	
Group I	France	29–32	Denmark	(Denmark) Emil Nielsen	
Group I	France	46–38	Portugal	(France) Dika Mem	
Group I	Spain	31–36	Denmark	(Denmark) Emil Nielsen	
Group I	Germany	30–28	Norway	(Germany) Andreas Wolff	
Group I	Portugal	35–35	Norway	(Portugal) Luís Frade	
Group I	Spain	36–32	France	(Spain) Ian Barrufet	
Group I	Denmark	31–26	Germany	(Denmark) Emil Nielsen	
Group I	Spain	27–35	Portugal	(Portugal) Martim Costa	
Group I	Germany	38–34	France	(Germany) Juri Knorr	
Group I	Denmark	38–24	Norway	(Denmark) Mathias Gidsel	
Group II	Iceland	29–30	Croatia	(Croatia) Zvonimir Srna	
Group II	Switzerland	29–29	Hungary	(Hungary) Kristóf Palasics	
Group II	Slovenia	31–35	Sweden	(Sweden) Lukas Sandell	
Group II	Slovenia	35–32	Hungary	(Slovenia) Blaž Janc	
Group II	Iceland	35–27	Sweden	(Iceland) Viggó Kristjánsson	
Group II	Switzerland	24–28	Croatia	(Croatia) Dominik Kuzmanović	
Group II	Switzerland	38–38	Iceland	(Switzerland) Noam Leopold	
Group II	Slovenia	25–29	Croatia	(Croatia) Matej Mandić	
Group II	Sweden	32–32	Hungary	(Sweden) Felix Claar	
Group II	Slovenia	31–39	Iceland	(Iceland) Elliði Viðarssonn	
Group II	Croatia	27–25	Hungary	(Croatia) Dominik Kuzmanović	
Group II	Switzerland	21–34	Sweden	(Sweden) Andreas Palicka	
Semifinals	Denmark	31–28	Iceland	(Denmark) Mathias Gidsel	
Semifinals	Croatia	28–31	Germany	(Germany) Andreas Wolff	
Fifth place game	Portugal	36–35	Sweden	(Portugal) Martim Costa	
Third place game	Iceland	33–34	Croatia	(Croatia) Tin Lučin	
Final	Denmark	34–27	Germany	(Denmark) Kevin Møller	

==== Notable statistics ====
- Highest attended game: 15,000 (Nine games) (Note: Denmark vs North Macedonia, Denmark vs Portugal, France vs Denmark, Spain vs Denmark, Denmark vs Germany, Denmark vs Norway, Croatia vs Germany, Denmark vs Iceland and Denmark vs Germany (final).)
- Lowest attended game: 2,026 (Switzerland 35–38 Slovenia, 20 January)
- Most goals in a game: 84 (France 46–38 Portugal, 24 January)
- Fewest goals in a game: 47 (North Macedonia 24–23 Romania, 20 January, Hungary 23–24 Iceland, 20 January)
- Most goals by a team in a game: 46 (France 46–26 Ukraine, 17 January, and France 46–38 Portugal, 24 January)
- Fewest goals by a team in a game: 21 (Switzerland 21–34 Sweden, 28 January)
- Biggest goal difference in a game: 20 (Ukraine 26–46 France, 17 January)
- Biggest half time deficit in a game: 13 (France 28–15 Portugal, 24 January)
- Most goals scored by a player in a game: 15 (Filip Kuzmanovski vs Portugal, 18 January, Jonáš Josef vs Ukraine, 19 January)

==== Notable occurrences ====
- On 16 January, Slovenia and Montenegro broke the record for most goals (combined) in a Euro game. Slovenia won 41–40, bringing the total to 81 goals. Consequently, the highest number of goals ever scored by the losing team in a match is 40.
- On 17 January, France's 46–26 win over Ukraine broke the record for the biggest win at the tournament's history and most goals ever scored by a team in one game.
- On 17 January, the 9,130 spectators for Serbia vs Germany broke the record for most fans at a match with Denmark not involved on the day. The record was later broken again with 9,526 spectators for Germany vs Spain.
- On 18 January, Faroe Islands secured their first ever win at Euro tournaments by beating Montenegro 37–24.
- On 18 January, Iceland won their fourth consecutive game at Euro tournaments for the first time.
- On 20 January, Switzerland reached the main round for the first time since 2004.
- On 20 January, Italy won their first game in 28 years after beating Poland 29–28.
- On 24 January, France and Portugal broke the record of most goals (combined) in a game at a Euro, with a 46–38 win for the French equating to 84 goals. This result beats the record that Slovenia's 41–40 win over Montenegro held for eight days. The French also broke the record of most goals at half time with 28.
- Italy, Montenegro, Romania and Ukraine suffered their worst losses at Euro tournaments.
- France, Iceland and Switzerland secured their biggest victories at Euro tournaments.

==== Tournament venues attendance ====
Venue	Total	Avr	Games
(Denmark) Jyske Bank Boxen	304,245	10,491	29
(Sweden) Malmö Arena	123,689	6,871	18
(Norway) Unity Arena	68,809	5,734	12
(Sweden) Kristianstad Arena	18,050	3,008	6

== Controversies ==
=== Schedule criticism ===
Before their semifinal against Germany, Croatian coach, Dagur Sigurðsson criticised the schedule as his team had to play two games in less than 24 hours and then go on a bus the Herning, meaning they had no training day before their semifinal, as well as the fact that the Croatian team as the only semifinalists had to stay in Silkeborg, 40 km away, rather than in Herning. As a response, the EHF acknowledged the criticism and stated that changes will be made in the future.

== Broadcasting rights ==
The television channels broadcasting the event is as follows:

Territory	Rights holder
Austria	ORF
Bosnia and Herzegovina	Arena Sport
Croatia	RTL, Arena Sport
Czech Republic	Czech TV
Denmark	TV 2
Spain	TVE
Faroe Islands	KVF
France	Bein Sports, FranceTV, HandballTV
Finland	Viaplay
United Kingdom	Viaplay
Georgia	Silknet
Germany	ARD, ZDF, DYN
Hungary	MTVA
Iceland	RÚV
Israel	Charlton, Sport 1
Italy	Sky Sport
Kosovo	Arena Sport
Montenegro	RTCG, Arena Sport
North Macedonia	MKRTV, Arena Sport
Netherlands	Ziggo Sport
Norway	Viaplay
Poland	Eurosport, TVP
Portugal	RTP
Romania	ProTV
Russia	Match TV
Slovenia	RTVSLO, Arena Sport
Serbia	RTS, Arena Sport
Switzerland	SRG
Slovakia	JOJ
Sweden	Viaplay
Ukraine	Suspilne
Rest of Europe	EHFTV

=== Outside of Europe ===
Territory	Rights holder
Canada, Japan	DAZN
Rest of World	EHFTV

== Notes ==
Reference
Day 1
Day 2
Day 3
Day 4
Day 5
Day 6
Day 7
Day 8
Day 9
Day 10
Day 11
Day 12
Day 13
Day 14 Group I
Day 14 Group II
Day 15
Day 16

Reference
Day 1
Day 2
Day 3
Day 4
Day 5
Day 6
Day 7
Day 8
Day 9
Day 10
Day 11
Day 12
Day 13
Day 14
Day 15
Day 16
