= 2015 World Men's Handball Championship – European qualification =

The European qualification for the 2015 World Men's Handball Championship, in Qatar, was disputed in two rounds among the teams that did not qualify for the 2014 European Men's Handball Championship and the 12 teams that placed outside of the European Championship's top three (excluding Spain, which were qualified automatically for the World Championship as holders).

In the first round of qualification, 20 teams not participating at the European Championship were split into five groups; the group winners advanced to the second round, joining the 12 European finalists and Germany, which was given a bye to this round. These 18 teams then were paired to play a two-legged playoff tie to determine the nine remaining World Championship qualifiers from Europe.

== Group stage ==
The draw was held on 27 June 2013. The group winners advanced to the playoff round.

=== Group 1 ===
Pos	Team	Pld	W	D	L	GF	GA	GD	Pts	Qualification
1	Lithuania	6	4	1	1	145	132	+13	9	Playoffs
2	Georgia	6	3	0	3	149	156	−7	6	
3	Finland	6	2	1	3	143	139	+4	5	
4	Turkey	6	2	0	4	146	156	−10	4	

30 October 2013; 18:45	Lithuania	23 – 17	Georgia	Cido Arena, Panevėžys; Attendance: 500; Referees: Novikov, Perepilitsy (UKR)
30 October 2013; 18:45	Drabavičius 4	(12–7)	Chikovani 6	Cido Arena, Panevėžys; Attendance: 500; Referees: Novikov, Perepilitsy (UKR)
30 October 2013; 18:45	3× (yellow card) 4× (suspension)	Report	3× (yellow card) 3× (suspension)	Cido Arena, Panevėžys; Attendance: 500; Referees: Novikov, Perepilitsy (UKR)

30 October 2013; 19:00	Finland	26 – 20	Turkey	Energia Areena, Vantaa; Attendance: 1,987; Referees: Cindrić, Gonzurek (CRO)
30 October 2013; 19:00	Mäkelä 10	(15–12)	Döne 6	Energia Areena, Vantaa; Attendance: 1,987; Referees: Cindrić, Gonzurek (CRO)
30 October 2013; 19:00	3× (yellow card) 5× (suspension)	Report	3× (yellow card) 7× (suspension)	Energia Areena, Vantaa; Attendance: 1,987; Referees: Cindrić, Gonzurek (CRO)

3 November 2013; 16:00	Turkey	20 – 23	Lithuania	THF Sport Hall, Ankara; Attendance: 600; Referees: Konjičanin, Konjičanin (BIH)
3 November 2013; 16:00	three players 4	(11–9)	Švedas 6	THF Sport Hall, Ankara; Attendance: 600; Referees: Konjičanin, Konjičanin (BIH)
3 November 2013; 16:00	2× (yellow card) 4× (suspension)	Report	3× (yellow card) 3× (suspension)	THF Sport Hall, Ankara; Attendance: 600; Referees: Konjičanin, Konjičanin (BIH)

3 November 2013; 18:00	Georgia	26 – 19	Finland	Sport Complex Arena, Tbilisi; Attendance: 3,000; Referees: Ben-Dan, Faran (ISR)
3 November 2013; 18:00	Chanturia 6	(8–10)	Sundberg, Tamminen 4	Sport Complex Arena, Tbilisi; Attendance: 3,000; Referees: Ben-Dan, Faran (ISR)
3 November 2013; 18:00	2× (yellow card) 6× (suspension)	Report	3× (yellow card) 4× (suspension)	Sport Complex Arena, Tbilisi; Attendance: 3,000; Referees: Ben-Dan, Faran (ISR)

2 January 2014; 18:00	Turkey	29 – 23	Georgia	THF Sport Hall, Ankara; Attendance: 500; Referees: Hájek, Macho (CZE)
2 January 2014; 18:00	Döne 10	(14–8)	Mskhvildze 5	THF Sport Hall, Ankara; Attendance: 500; Referees: Hájek, Macho (CZE)
2 January 2014; 18:00	3× (yellow card) 5× (suspension)	Report	3× (yellow card) 3× (suspension)	THF Sport Hall, Ankara; Attendance: 500; Referees: Hájek, Macho (CZE)

2 January 2014; 19:00	Finland	20 – 20	Lithuania	Energia Areena, Vantaa; Attendance: 1,300; Referees: Nabokau, Kulik (BLR)
2 January 2014; 19:00	Sundberg 9	(10–10)	Petreikis 7	Energia Areena, Vantaa; Attendance: 1,300; Referees: Nabokau, Kulik (BLR)
2 January 2014; 19:00	3× (yellow card) 4× (suspension) 2× (red card)	Report	3× (yellow card) 7× (suspension) 1× (red card)	Energia Areena, Vantaa; Attendance: 1,300; Referees: Nabokau, Kulik (BLR)

4 January 2014; 17:00	Lithuania	24 – 23	Finland	Siemens Arena, Vilnius; Attendance: 1,900; Referees: Argyridis, Mouttas (CYP)
4 January 2014; 17:00	Petreikis 7	(10–13)	Koljonen 6	Siemens Arena, Vilnius; Attendance: 1,900; Referees: Argyridis, Mouttas (CYP)
4 January 2014; 17:00	3× (yellow card) 5× (suspension)	Report	3× (yellow card) 5× (suspension)	Siemens Arena, Vilnius; Attendance: 1,900; Referees: Argyridis, Mouttas (CYP)

5 January 2014; 18:00	Georgia	33 – 26	Turkey	Tbilisi Sports Palace, Tbilisi; Attendance: 2,500; Referees: Harabagiu, Stanescu (ROU)
5 January 2014; 18:00	Mskhvildze 11	(19–15)	Catkin 5	Tbilisi Sports Palace, Tbilisi; Attendance: 2,500; Referees: Harabagiu, Stanescu (ROU)
5 January 2014; 18:00	3× (yellow card) 5× (suspension)	Report	1× (yellow card) 4× (suspension)	Tbilisi Sports Palace, Tbilisi; Attendance: 2,500; Referees: Harabagiu, Stanescu (ROU)

8 January 2014; 18:00	Georgia	26 – 23	Lithuania	Tbilisi Sports Palace, Tbilisi; Attendance: 2,700; Referees: Zendali, Riello (ITA)
8 January 2014; 18:00	Mskhvildze 7	(15–12)	Petreikis 7	Tbilisi Sports Palace, Tbilisi; Attendance: 2,700; Referees: Zendali, Riello (ITA)
8 January 2014; 18:00	3× (yellow card) 3× (suspension)	Report	3× (yellow card) 3× (suspension)	Tbilisi Sports Palace, Tbilisi; Attendance: 2,700; Referees: Zendali, Riello (ITA)

8 January 2014; 18:00	Turkey	25 – 19	Finland	THF Sport Hall, Ankara; Attendance: 200; Referees: Vesović, Mitrović (MNE)
8 January 2014; 18:00	Döne 9	(11–9)	Rönnberg 8	THF Sport Hall, Ankara; Attendance: 200; Referees: Vesović, Mitrović (MNE)
8 January 2014; 18:00	3× (yellow card) 6× (suspension) 2× (red card)	Report	3× (yellow card) 3× (suspension)	THF Sport Hall, Ankara; Attendance: 200; Referees: Vesović, Mitrović (MNE)

11 January 2014; 17:00	Finland	36 – 24	Georgia	Sisu Arena, Karis; Attendance: 860; Referees: Thomassen, Schmack (BEL)
11 January 2014; 17:00	Tamminen 10	(16–10)	Mskhvildze 9	Sisu Arena, Karis; Attendance: 860; Referees: Thomassen, Schmack (BEL)
11 January 2014; 17:00	2× (yellow card) 3× (suspension)	Report	2× (yellow card) 4× (suspension)	Sisu Arena, Karis; Attendance: 860; Referees: Thomassen, Schmack (BEL)

12 January 2014; 17:00	Lithuania	32 – 26	Turkey	Siemens Arena, Vilnius; Attendance: 1,500; Referees: Cvetko, Kavalar (SLO)
12 January 2014; 17:00	Babarskas, Petreikis 5	(18–13)	Döne 8	Siemens Arena, Vilnius; Attendance: 1,500; Referees: Cvetko, Kavalar (SLO)
12 January 2014; 17:00	3× (yellow card) 3× (suspension)	Report	3× (yellow card) 2× (suspension)	Siemens Arena, Vilnius; Attendance: 1,500; Referees: Cvetko, Kavalar (SLO)

=== Group 2 ===
Pos	Team	Pld	W	D	L	GF	GA	GD	Pts	Qualification
1	Romania	6	5	0	1	181	151	+30	10	Playoffs
2	Slovakia	6	5	0	1	168	136	+32	10	
3	Italy	6	2	0	4	168	176	−8	4	
4	Cyprus	6	0	0	6	138	192	−54	0	

30 October 2013; 19:15	Slovakia	35 – 14	Cyprus	Sportová hala Povazska Bystrica, Považská Bystrica; Attendance: 1,400; Referees: Geraets, Geraets (NED)
30 October 2013; 19:15	Antl 8	(16–5)	Demosthenous, Georgiou 3	Sportová hala Povazska Bystrica, Považská Bystrica; Attendance: 1,400; Referees: Geraets, Geraets (NED)
30 October 2013; 19:15	3× (yellow card) 2× (suspension)	Report	3× (yellow card) 3× (suspension)	Sportová hala Povazska Bystrica, Považská Bystrica; Attendance: 1,400; Referees: Geraets, Geraets (NED)

31 October 2013; 20:00	Italy	22 – 23	Romania	Anfiteatro Giovanni Paolo II, Pescara; Attendance: 1,700; Referees: Mitrevski, Todorovski (MKD)
31 October 2013; 20:00	Radovcic, Skatar 6	(9–11)	Asoltanei 4	Anfiteatro Giovanni Paolo II, Pescara; Attendance: 1,700; Referees: Mitrevski, Todorovski (MKD)
31 October 2013; 20:00	3× (yellow card) 4× (suspension)	Report	3× (yellow card) 7× (suspension) 1× (red card)	Anfiteatro Giovanni Paolo II, Pescara; Attendance: 1,700; Referees: Mitrevski, Todorovski (MKD)

3 November 2013; 17:30	Romania	32 – 24	Slovakia	Dinamo Polyvalent Hall, Bucharest; Attendance: 1,800; Referees: Schulze, Tönnies (GER)
3 November 2013; 17:30	Mihalcea 8	(14–10)	Hruščák 7	Dinamo Polyvalent Hall, Bucharest; Attendance: 1,800; Referees: Schulze, Tönnies (GER)
3 November 2013; 17:30	3× (yellow card) 6× (suspension)	Report	3× (yellow card) 6× (suspension)	Dinamo Polyvalent Hall, Bucharest; Attendance: 1,800; Referees: Schulze, Tönnies (GER)

3 November 2013; 19:00	Cyprus	29 – 36	Italy	University of Cyprus Athletic Center, Nicosia; Attendance: 300; Referees: Sirbu, Suponicov (MDA)
3 November 2013; 19:00	three players 5	(15–18)	Maione, Skatar 7	University of Cyprus Athletic Center, Nicosia; Attendance: 300; Referees: Sirbu, Suponicov (MDA)
3 November 2013; 19:00	3× (yellow card) 5× (suspension)	Report	2× (yellow card) 4× (suspension) 1× (red card)	University of Cyprus Athletic Center, Nicosia; Attendance: 300; Referees: Sirbu, Suponicov (MDA)

2 January 2014; 18:00	Romania	36 – 19	Cyprus	Dinamo Polyvalent Hall, Bucharest; Attendance: 1,000; Referees: Martens, Verdonck (BEL)
2 January 2014; 18:00	Csepreghi 5	(18–10)	Nikiforou 6	Dinamo Polyvalent Hall, Bucharest; Attendance: 1,000; Referees: Martens, Verdonck (BEL)
2 January 2014; 18:00	2× (yellow card) 6× (suspension)	Report	3× (yellow card) 4× (suspension)	Dinamo Polyvalent Hall, Bucharest; Attendance: 1,000; Referees: Martens, Verdonck (BEL)

2 January 2014; 20:00	Italy	26 – 34	Slovakia	Palazzetto dello Sport Santa Filomena, Chieti; Attendance: 1,500; Referees: Kouz, Zhoba (UKR)
2 January 2014; 20:00	Maione 7	(14–16)	Straňovský 10	Palazzetto dello Sport Santa Filomena, Chieti; Attendance: 1,500; Referees: Kouz, Zhoba (UKR)
2 January 2014; 20:00	2× (yellow card) 5× (suspension)	Report	3× (yellow card) 8× (suspension) 1× (red card)	Palazzetto dello Sport Santa Filomena, Chieti; Attendance: 1,500; Referees: Kouz, Zhoba (UKR)

4 January 2014; 17:00	Slovakia	28 – 21	Italy	City sport hall, Hlohovec; Attendance: 1,900; Referees: Jaskins, Zabko (LAT)
4 January 2014; 17:00	Hruščák 6	(13–10)	Skatar 5	City sport hall, Hlohovec; Attendance: 1,900; Referees: Jaskins, Zabko (LAT)
4 January 2014; 17:00	2× (yellow card) 2× (suspension)	Report	1× (yellow card) 1× (suspension)	City sport hall, Hlohovec; Attendance: 1,900; Referees: Jaskins, Zabko (LAT)

5 January 2014; 18:00	Cyprus	30 – 31	Romania	University of Cyprus Athletic Center, Nicosia; Attendance: 220; Referees: Jović, Arnautović (BIH)
5 January 2014; 18:00	Demosthenous, Georgiou 7	(16–15)	Fenici, Talas 5	University of Cyprus Athletic Center, Nicosia; Attendance: 220; Referees: Jović, Arnautović (BIH)
5 January 2014; 18:00	3× (yellow card) 3× (suspension)	Report	3× (yellow card) 2× (suspension)	University of Cyprus Athletic Center, Nicosia; Attendance: 220; Referees: Jović, Arnautović (BIH)

8 January 2014; 18:00	Romania	34 – 29	Italy	Dinamo Polyvalent Hall, Bucharest; Attendance: 1,500; Referees: Brunner, Salah (SUI)
8 January 2014; 18:00	Acatrinei 7	(20–13)	Marrochi 6	Dinamo Polyvalent Hall, Bucharest; Attendance: 1,500; Referees: Brunner, Salah (SUI)
8 January 2014; 18:00	3× (yellow card) 2× (suspension)	Report	3× (yellow card) 4× (suspension)	Dinamo Polyvalent Hall, Bucharest; Attendance: 1,500; Referees: Brunner, Salah (SUI)

8 January 2014; 19:00	Cyprus	18 – 20	Slovakia	University of Cyprus Athletic Center, Nicosia; Attendance: 160; Referees: Sekulić, Jovandić (SRB)
8 January 2014; 19:00	Demosthenous 6	(9–11)	four players 3	University of Cyprus Athletic Center, Nicosia; Attendance: 160; Referees: Sekulić, Jovandić (SRB)
8 January 2014; 19:00	3× (yellow card) 1× (suspension)	Report	3× (yellow card) 4× (suspension)	University of Cyprus Athletic Center, Nicosia; Attendance: 160; Referees: Sekulić, Jovandić (SRB)

11 January 2014; 17:00	Slovakia	27 – 25	Romania	Mestská Sportova hala Sala, Šaľa; Attendance: 3,000; Referees: Caçador, Nicolau (POR)
11 January 2014; 17:00	Ďuriš 8	(11–10)	Șimicu 8	Mestská Sportova hala Sala, Šaľa; Attendance: 3,000; Referees: Caçador, Nicolau (POR)
11 January 2014; 17:00	3× (yellow card) 3× (suspension)	Report	3× (yellow card) 3× (suspension) 1× (red card)	Mestská Sportova hala Sala, Šaľa; Attendance: 3,000; Referees: Caçador, Nicolau (POR)

12 January 2014; 20:00	Italy	34 – 28	Cyprus	Palazzetto dello Sport Andria, Andria; Attendance: 2,500; Referees: Hofer, Schmidhuber (AUT)
12 January 2014; 20:00	Maione, Marrochi 8	(21–10)	Argyrou, Georgiou 6	Palazzetto dello Sport Andria, Andria; Attendance: 2,500; Referees: Hofer, Schmidhuber (AUT)
12 January 2014; 20:00	3× (yellow card) 4× (suspension)	Report	3× (yellow card) 4× (suspension)	Palazzetto dello Sport Andria, Andria; Attendance: 2,500; Referees: Hofer, Schmidhuber (AUT)

=== Group 3 ===
Pos	Team	Pld	W	D	L	GF	GA	GD	Pts	Qualification
1	Slovenia	6	5	0	1	200	150	+50	10	Playoffs
2	Ukraine	6	4	1	1	193	184	+9	9	
3	Switzerland	6	2	1	3	178	176	+2	5	
4	Luxembourg	6	0	0	6	144	205	−61	0	

30 October 2013; 19:30	Luxembourg	34 – 38	Ukraine	D'Coque, Luxembourg City; Attendance: 1,000; Referees: Lillepea, Kull (EST)
30 October 2013; 19:30	Bock 8	(16–20)	Shevelev 10	D'Coque, Luxembourg City; Attendance: 1,000; Referees: Lillepea, Kull (EST)
30 October 2013; 19:30	3× (yellow card) 6× (suspension)	Report	2× (yellow card) 7× (suspension) 1× (red card)	D'Coque, Luxembourg City; Attendance: 1,000; Referees: Lillepea, Kull (EST)

30 October 2013; 20:00	Slovenia	33 – 30	Switzerland	Red Hall, Velenje; Attendance: 1,500; Referees: Gousko, Repkin (BLR)
30 October 2013; 20:00	Mačkovšek 7	(18–13)	three players 5	Red Hall, Velenje; Attendance: 1,500; Referees: Gousko, Repkin (BLR)
30 October 2013; 20:00	3× (yellow card) 3× (suspension)	Report	3× (yellow card) 3× (suspension)	Red Hall, Velenje; Attendance: 1,500; Referees: Gousko, Repkin (BLR)

3 November 2013; 15:30	Switzerland	32 – 23	Luxembourg	Saalsporthalle, Zürich; Attendance: 1,300; Referees: Guðjónsson, Samuelsen
3 November 2013; 15:30	Schmid 10	(15–9)	Muller 6	Saalsporthalle, Zürich; Attendance: 1,300; Referees: Guðjónsson, Samuelsen
3 November 2013; 15:30	2× (yellow card) 3× (suspension) 1× (red card)	Report	3× (yellow card) 5× (suspension)	Saalsporthalle, Zürich; Attendance: 1,300; Referees: Guðjónsson, Samuelsen

3 November 2013; 17:30	Ukraine	32 – 28	Slovenia	Palace of Sports Yunost, Zaporizhia; Attendance: 800; Referees: Horáček, Novotný (CZE)
3 November 2013; 17:30	Ostroushko, Onufryienko 8	(16–15)	Žvižej 7	Palace of Sports Yunost, Zaporizhia; Attendance: 800; Referees: Horáček, Novotný (CZE)
3 November 2013; 17:30	3× (yellow card) 7× (suspension) 1× (red card)	Report	3× (yellow card) 3× (suspension)	Palace of Sports Yunost, Zaporizhia; Attendance: 800; Referees: Horáček, Novotný (CZE)

2 January 2014; 17:30	Ukraine	34 – 34	Switzerland	Palace of Sports Yunost, Zaporizhia; Attendance: 1,000; Referees: Brunovský, Čanda (SVK)
2 January 2014; 17:30	Onufryienko 9	(21–16)	Graubner 7	Palace of Sports Yunost, Zaporizhia; Attendance: 1,000; Referees: Brunovský, Čanda (SVK)
2 January 2014; 17:30	3× (yellow card) 3× (suspension)	Report	3× (yellow card) 1× (suspension) 1× (red card)	Palace of Sports Yunost, Zaporizhia; Attendance: 1,000; Referees: Brunovský, Čanda (SVK)

2 January 2014; 19:30	Luxembourg	16 – 36	Slovenia	Centre Sportif de Differdange, Differdange; Attendance: 600; Referees: Hermann, Madsen (DEN)
2 January 2014; 19:30	Meis, Pulli 5	(7–13)	Gajić 13	Centre Sportif de Differdange, Differdange; Attendance: 600; Referees: Hermann, Madsen (DEN)
2 January 2014; 19:30	3× (yellow card) 3× (suspension)	Report	3× (yellow card) 6× (suspension)	Centre Sportif de Differdange, Differdange; Attendance: 600; Referees: Hermann, Madsen (DEN)

5 January 2014; 15:30	Switzerland	31 – 32	Ukraine	BBC Arena, Schaffhausen; Attendance: 1,750; Referees: Elíasson, Pálsson (ISL)
5 January 2014; 15:30	Liniger 7	(17–16)	Onufryienko 10	BBC Arena, Schaffhausen; Attendance: 1,750; Referees: Elíasson, Pálsson (ISL)
5 January 2014; 15:30	3× (yellow card) 5× (suspension)	Report	3× (yellow card) 4× (suspension)	BBC Arena, Schaffhausen; Attendance: 1,750; Referees: Elíasson, Pálsson (ISL)

5 January 2014; 18:30	Slovenia	37 – 26	Luxembourg	Red Hall, Velenje; Attendance: 1,000; Referees: Scevola, Alperan (ITA)
5 January 2014; 18:30	Gajić, Mačkovšek 5	(19–13)	Meis 8	Red Hall, Velenje; Attendance: 1,000; Referees: Scevola, Alperan (ITA)
5 January 2014; 18:30	3× (yellow card) 2× (suspension)	Report	3× (yellow card) 4× (suspension)	Red Hall, Velenje; Attendance: 1,000; Referees: Scevola, Alperan (ITA)

9 January 2014; 16:45	Ukraine	34 – 22	Luxembourg	Palace of Sports Yunost, Zaporizhia; Attendance: 1,500; Referees: Yudchyts, Kot (BLR)
9 January 2014; 16:45	Burka, Stetsyura 8	(15–12)	Meis, Schroeder 5	Palace of Sports Yunost, Zaporizhia; Attendance: 1,500; Referees: Yudchyts, Kot (BLR)
9 January 2014; 16:45	3× (yellow card) 3× (suspension) 1× (red card)	Report	3× (yellow card) 5× (suspension)	Palace of Sports Yunost, Zaporizhia; Attendance: 1,500; Referees: Yudchyts, Kot (BLR)

9 January 2014; 20:00	Switzerland	23 – 31	Slovenia	BBC Arena, Schaffhausen; Attendance: 750; Referees: Pichon, Reveret (FRA)
9 January 2014; 20:00	Liniger 8	(12–19)	Gajić 11	BBC Arena, Schaffhausen; Attendance: 750; Referees: Pichon, Reveret (FRA)
9 January 2014; 20:00	3× (yellow card) 2× (suspension)	Report	3× (yellow card) 3× (suspension)	BBC Arena, Schaffhausen; Attendance: 750; Referees: Pichon, Reveret (FRA)

12 January 2014; 17:00	Luxembourg	23 – 28	Switzerland	D'Coque, Luxembourg City; Attendance: 400; Referees: Bol, van Eck (NED)
12 January 2014; 17:00	Meis 5	(14–13)	Graubner 6	D'Coque, Luxembourg City; Attendance: 400; Referees: Bol, van Eck (NED)
12 January 2014; 17:00	2× (yellow card) 11× (suspension) 2× (red card)	Report	2× (yellow card) 5× (suspension)	D'Coque, Luxembourg City; Attendance: 400; Referees: Bol, van Eck (NED)

12 January 2014; 18:00	Slovenia	35 – 23	Ukraine	Red Hall, Velenje; Attendance: 2,000; Referees: Cohen, Peretz (ISR)
12 January 2014; 18:00	Gajić 7	(15–10)	Ostroushko 6	Red Hall, Velenje; Attendance: 2,000; Referees: Cohen, Peretz (ISR)
12 January 2014; 18:00	3× (yellow card) 6× (suspension) 2× (red card)	Report	2× (yellow card) 8× (suspension) 1× (red card)	Red Hall, Velenje; Attendance: 2,000; Referees: Cohen, Peretz (ISR)

=== Group 4 ===
Pos	Team	Pld	W	D	L	GF	GA	GD	Pts	Qualification
1	Greece	6	3	1	2	160	158	+2	7	Playoffs
2	Netherlands	6	3	0	3	153	145	+8	6	
3	Israel	6	3	0	3	166	169	−3	6	
4	Belgium	6	2	1	3	158	165	−7	5	

30 October 2013; 19:30	Netherlands	25 – 20	Greece	Fitland XL, Sittard; Attendance: 1,502; Referees: Boričić, Marković (SRB)
30 October 2013; 19:30	Miedema, Sluijters 5	(12–10)	three players 3	Fitland XL, Sittard; Attendance: 1,502; Referees: Boričić, Marković (SRB)
30 October 2013; 19:30	3× (yellow card) 5× (suspension)	Report	3× (yellow card) 4× (suspension) 1× (red card)	Fitland XL, Sittard; Attendance: 1,502; Referees: Boričić, Marković (SRB)

30 October 2013; 20:00	Belgium	29 – 28	Israel	Flanders Sports Arena, Ghent; Attendance: 1,800; Referees: Pandžić, Šatordžija (BIH)
30 October 2013; 20:00	Cauwenberghs, Jacobs 5	(17–14)	Pomeranz 6	Flanders Sports Arena, Ghent; Attendance: 1,800; Referees: Pandžić, Šatordžija (BIH)
30 October 2013; 20:00	3× (yellow card) 5× (suspension)	Report	3× (yellow card) 4× (suspension) 1× (red card)	Flanders Sports Arena, Ghent; Attendance: 1,800; Referees: Pandžić, Šatordžija (BIH)

3 November 2013; 19:45	Israel	28 – 26	Netherlands	Maccabi House Arena, Rishon LeZion; Attendance: 1,000; Referees: Kolevski, Krkačev (MKD)
3 November 2013; 19:45	Pomeranz 12	(15–12)	Schagen 9	Maccabi House Arena, Rishon LeZion; Attendance: 1,000; Referees: Kolevski, Krkačev (MKD)
3 November 2013; 19:45	3× (yellow card) 6× (suspension)	Report	3× (yellow card) 5× (suspension)	Maccabi House Arena, Rishon LeZion; Attendance: 1,000; Referees: Kolevski, Krkačev (MKD)

3 November 2013; 20:00	Greece	31 – 25	Belgium	Liossion Indor Arena, Athens; Attendance: 1,000; Referees: Mishchuk, Rozhkov (UKR)
3 November 2013; 20:00	Papadopoulos 6	(16–13)	Cauwenberghs, Kopljar 6	Liossion Indor Arena, Athens; Attendance: 1,000; Referees: Mishchuk, Rozhkov (UKR)
3 November 2013; 20:00	1× (yellow card) 3× (suspension)	Report	2× (yellow card) 5× (suspension)	Liossion Indor Arena, Athens; Attendance: 1,000; Referees: Mishchuk, Rozhkov (UKR)

2 January 2014; 19:45	Israel	31 – 24	Greece	Maccabi House Arena, Rishon LeZion; Attendance: 1,100; Referees: Jurinović, Mrvica (CRO)
2 January 2014; 19:45	Pomeranz 7	(16–13)	Tziras 7	Maccabi House Arena, Rishon LeZion; Attendance: 1,100; Referees: Jurinović, Mrvica (CRO)
2 January 2014; 19:45	3× (yellow card) 4× (suspension) 1× (red card)	Report	3× (yellow card) 4× (suspension)	Maccabi House Arena, Rishon LeZion; Attendance: 1,100; Referees: Jurinović, Mrvica (CRO)

2 January 2014; 20:10	Belgium	28 – 22	Netherlands	Sporthal Alverberg, Hasselt; Attendance: 1,700; Referees: Frieser, Frieser (CZE)
2 January 2014; 20:10	Bolaers 8	(12–9)	Schagen 9	Sporthal Alverberg, Hasselt; Attendance: 1,700; Referees: Frieser, Frieser (CZE)
2 January 2014; 20:10	3× (yellow card) 5× (suspension)	Report	3× (yellow card) 3× (suspension)	Sporthal Alverberg, Hasselt; Attendance: 1,700; Referees: Frieser, Frieser (CZE)

5 January 2014; 14:00	Netherlands	27 – 21	Belgium	Fitland XL, Sittard; Attendance: 2,000; Referees: Baranowski, Lemanowicz (POL)
5 January 2014; 14:00	Verjans 8	(14–10)	Kedziora 6	Fitland XL, Sittard; Attendance: 2,000; Referees: Baranowski, Lemanowicz (POL)
5 January 2014; 14:00	3× (yellow card) 6× (suspension) 1× (red card)	Report	3× (yellow card) 7× (suspension)	Fitland XL, Sittard; Attendance: 2,000; Referees: Baranowski, Lemanowicz (POL)

5 January 2014; 17:00	Greece	31 – 28	Israel	Mikras 3, Thessaloniki; Attendance: 1,000; Referees: Gasmi, Gasmi (FRA)
5 January 2014; 17:00	Papadopoulos 9	(16–15)	Pomeranz 9	Mikras 3, Thessaloniki; Attendance: 1,000; Referees: Gasmi, Gasmi (FRA)
5 January 2014; 17:00	3× (yellow card) 5× (suspension)	Report	3× (yellow card) 4× (suspension)	Mikras 3, Thessaloniki; Attendance: 1,000; Referees: Gasmi, Gasmi (FRA)

8 January 2014; 19:00	Greece	24 – 19	Netherlands	Mikras 3, Thessaloniki; Attendance: 960; Referees: Pavel, State (ROU)
8 January 2014; 19:00	Alvanos 7	(11–7)	Smits, Verjans 6	Mikras 3, Thessaloniki; Attendance: 960; Referees: Pavel, State (ROU)
8 January 2014; 19:00	3× (yellow card) 3× (suspension)	Report	3× (yellow card) 3× (suspension)	Mikras 3, Thessaloniki; Attendance: 960; Referees: Pavel, State (ROU)

8 January 2014; 19:45	Israel	27 – 25	Belgium	Maccabi House Arena, Rishon LeZion; Attendance: 1,140; Referees: Pavićević, Ražnatović (MNE)
8 January 2014; 19:45	Pomeranz 11	(12–11)	Kedziora 10	Maccabi House Arena, Rishon LeZion; Attendance: 1,140; Referees: Pavićević, Ražnatović (MNE)
8 January 2014; 19:45	3× (yellow card)	Report	3× (yellow card) 2× (suspension)	Maccabi House Arena, Rishon LeZion; Attendance: 1,140; Referees: Pavićević, Ražnatović (MNE)

11 January 2014; 20:30	Belgium	30 – 30	Greece	Hall omnisport La Preale, Herstal; Attendance: 1,200; Referees: Andorka, Hucker (HUN)
11 January 2014; 20:30	Cauwenberghs, Bolaers 6	(14–13)	Papadopoulos 9	Hall omnisport La Preale, Herstal; Attendance: 1,200; Referees: Andorka, Hucker (HUN)
11 January 2014; 20:30	2× (yellow card) 3× (suspension)	Report	2× (yellow card) 2× (suspension)	Hall omnisport La Preale, Herstal; Attendance: 1,200; Referees: Andorka, Hucker (HUN)

12 January 2014; 14:00	Netherlands	34 – 24	Israel	Fitland XL, Sittard; Attendance: 1,100; Referees: Johansson, Kliko (SWE)
12 January 2014; 14:00	Van Schie 8	(14–11)	Pomeranz 10	Fitland XL, Sittard; Attendance: 1,100; Referees: Johansson, Kliko (SWE)
12 January 2014; 14:00	2× (yellow card) 4× (suspension)	Report	3× (yellow card) 6× (suspension)	Fitland XL, Sittard; Attendance: 1,100; Referees: Johansson, Kliko (SWE)

=== Group 5 ===
Pos	Team	Pld	W	D	L	GF	GA	GD	Pts	Qualification
1	Bosnia and Herzegovina	6	5	0	1	164	155	+9	10	Playoffs
2	Portugal	6	4	0	2	168	154	+14	8	
3	Latvia	6	2	0	4	165	159	+6	4	
4	Estonia	6	1	0	5	153	182	−29	2	

30 October 2013; 21:00	Portugal	26 – 29	Latvia	Pavilhão Gimnodesportivo da Nazare, Nazaré; Attendance: 2,000; Referees: Kékes, Kékes (HUN)
30 October 2013; 21:00	four players 4	(9–13)	Jurdzs 9	Pavilhão Gimnodesportivo da Nazare, Nazaré; Attendance: 2,000; Referees: Kékes, Kékes (HUN)
30 October 2013; 21:00	3× (yellow card) 4× (suspension)	Report	2× (yellow card) 6× (suspension) 1× (red card)	Pavilhão Gimnodesportivo da Nazare, Nazaré; Attendance: 2,000; Referees: Kékes, Kékes (HUN)

31 October 2013; 19:00	Estonia	26 – 29	Bosnia and Herzegovina	Kalevi Spordihall, Tallinn; Attendance: 1,308; Referees: Olesen, Pedersen (DEN)
31 October 2013; 19:00	Jaanimaa 7	(13–18)	Delić, Prce 6	Kalevi Spordihall, Tallinn; Attendance: 1,308; Referees: Olesen, Pedersen (DEN)
31 October 2013; 19:00	3× (yellow card) 3× (suspension)	Report	3× (yellow card) 6× (suspension)	Kalevi Spordihall, Tallinn; Attendance: 1,308; Referees: Olesen, Pedersen (DEN)

3 November 2013; 15:05	Latvia	35 – 25	Estonia	Sports Centre Dobele, Dobele; Attendance: 1,150; Referees: Kiyashko, Kiselev (RUS)
3 November 2013; 15:05	Krištopāns 8	(18–13)	Pinnonen 8	Sports Centre Dobele, Dobele; Attendance: 1,150; Referees: Kiyashko, Kiselev (RUS)
3 November 2013; 15:05	2× (yellow card) 8× (suspension)	Report	3× (yellow card) 5× (suspension)	Sports Centre Dobele, Dobele; Attendance: 1,150; Referees: Kiyashko, Kiselev (RUS)

3 November 2013; 17:00	Bosnia and Herzegovina	31 – 29	Portugal	Olimpijska dvorana Ramiz Salčin Mojmilo, Sarajevo; Attendance: 1,000; Referees: Leandersson, Lindroos (FIN)
3 November 2013; 17:00	Prce 9	(13–14)	Pedroso 5	Olimpijska dvorana Ramiz Salčin Mojmilo, Sarajevo; Attendance: 1,000; Referees: Leandersson, Lindroos (FIN)
3 November 2013; 17:00	2× (yellow card) 4× (suspension)	Report	3× (yellow card) 8× (suspension)	Olimpijska dvorana Ramiz Salčin Mojmilo, Sarajevo; Attendance: 1,000; Referees: Leandersson, Lindroos (FIN)

2 January 2014; 17:00	Bosnia and Herzegovina	27 – 26	Latvia	City Hall Vitez, Vitez; Attendance: 2,000; Referees: Baďura, Ondogrecula (SVK)
2 January 2014; 17:00	Ovčina 6	(17–11)	Pavlovičs 9	City Hall Vitez, Vitez; Attendance: 2,000; Referees: Baďura, Ondogrecula (SVK)
2 January 2014; 17:00	3× (yellow card) 4× (suspension)	Report	2× (yellow card) 3× (suspension)	City Hall Vitez, Vitez; Attendance: 2,000; Referees: Baďura, Ondogrecula (SVK)

2 January 2014; 20:00	Estonia	17 – 25	Portugal	Mesikäpa Hall, Põlva; Attendance: 800; Referees: Baumgart, Wild (GER)
2 January 2014; 20:00	Laast 7	(10–9)	Caseiro, Martins da Silva 4	Mesikäpa Hall, Põlva; Attendance: 800; Referees: Baumgart, Wild (GER)
2 January 2014; 20:00	3× (yellow card) 4× (suspension)	Report	3× (yellow card) 3× (suspension)	Mesikäpa Hall, Põlva; Attendance: 800; Referees: Baumgart, Wild (GER)

5 January 2014; 15:00	Portugal	35 – 27	Estonia	Pavilhao Municipal das Travessas, São João da Madeira; Attendance: 3,500; Referees: Cabrejas, Sánchez (ESP)
5 January 2014; 15:00	three players 4	(20–11)	Patrail 7	Pavilhao Municipal das Travessas, São João da Madeira; Attendance: 3,500; Referees: Cabrejas, Sánchez (ESP)
5 January 2014; 15:00	3× (yellow card) 6× (suspension)	Report	3× (yellow card) 1× (suspension)	Pavilhao Municipal das Travessas, São João da Madeira; Attendance: 3,500; Referees: Cabrejas, Sánchez (ESP)

5 January 2014; 15:05	Latvia	21 – 23	Bosnia and Herzegovina	Sports Centre Dobele, Dobele; Attendance: 1,200; Referees: Mata, Lopéz (ESP)
5 January 2014; 15:05	Krištopans 7	(10–13)	three players 4	Sports Centre Dobele, Dobele; Attendance: 1,200; Referees: Mata, Lopéz (ESP)
5 January 2014; 15:05	3× (yellow card) 1× (suspension) 1× (red card)	Report	3× (yellow card) 3× (suspension) 1× (red card)	Sports Centre Dobele, Dobele; Attendance: 1,200; Referees: Mata, Lopéz (ESP)

8 January 2014; 17:00	Bosnia and Herzegovina	28 – 26	Estonia	City Hall Vitez, Vitez; Attendance: 2,000; Referees: Herczeg, Südi (HUN)
8 January 2014; 17:00	Ovčina 6	(15–9)	Patrail 8	City Hall Vitez, Vitez; Attendance: 2,000; Referees: Herczeg, Südi (HUN)
8 January 2014; 17:00	2× (yellow card) 3× (suspension)	Report	3× (yellow card) 5× (suspension) 1× (red card)	City Hall Vitez, Vitez; Attendance: 2,000; Referees: Herczeg, Südi (HUN)

8 January 2014; 19:05	Latvia	24 – 26	Portugal	Sports Centre Dobele, Dobele; Attendance: 1,000; Referees: Sager, Styger (SUI)
8 January 2014; 19:05	Borodovskis, Krištopāns 6	(13–8)	Caseiro 5	Sports Centre Dobele, Dobele; Attendance: 1,000; Referees: Sager, Styger (SUI)
8 January 2014; 19:05	3× (yellow card) 4× (suspension)	Report	3× (yellow card) 4× (suspension)	Sports Centre Dobele, Dobele; Attendance: 1,000; Referees: Sager, Styger (SUI)

11 January 2014; 16:00	Estonia	32 – 30	Latvia	Mesikäpa Hall, Põlva; Attendance: 400; Referees: Samuelsen, Gudjonsson
11 January 2014; 16:00	Jaanimaa 9	(13–14)	Jurdzs 9	Mesikäpa Hall, Põlva; Attendance: 400; Referees: Samuelsen, Gudjonsson
11 January 2014; 16:00	3× (yellow card) 2× (suspension)	Report	3× (yellow card) 2× (suspension)	Mesikäpa Hall, Põlva; Attendance: 400; Referees: Samuelsen, Gudjonsson

12 January 2014; 15:00	Portugal	27 – 26	Bosnia and Herzegovina	Pavilhao Desportivo Municipal de Mafra, Mafra; Attendance: 2,000; Referees: Erdoğan, Özdeniz (TUR)
12 January 2014; 15:00	Duarte 7	(14–13)	Toromanović 5	Pavilhao Desportivo Municipal de Mafra, Mafra; Attendance: 2,000; Referees: Erdoğan, Özdeniz (TUR)
12 January 2014; 15:00	2× (yellow card) 3× (suspension)	Report	3× (yellow card) 5× (suspension)	Pavilhao Desportivo Municipal de Mafra, Mafra; Attendance: 2,000; Referees: Erdoğan, Özdeniz (TUR)

== Play-off round ==
The draw was held on 26 January 2014 at 13:00 in Herning, Denmark. The draw saw 18 teams competing for nine places at the 2015 World Men's Handball Championship. The teams were placed in two pots and drawn together to form nine play-off pairs. After a two-legged tie the winner of each pair qualified to the final tournament. All seeded teams (Iceland, Poland, Sweden, Hungary, Russia, Macedonia, Austria, Belarus, Serbia) and three unseeded (e.g. Norway, Czech Republic and Montenegro) had qualified for the play-off round as 12 of the 2014 European Men's Handball Championship which are not qualified directly to the final tournament.

=== Matches ===
Team 1	Agg.	Team 2	1st leg	2nd leg
Hungary	51–54	Slovenia	25–22	26–32
Romania	45–52	Sweden	24–25	21–27
Poland	54–52	Germany	25–24	29–28
Greece	48–62	Macedonia	25–27	23–35
Serbia	44–48	Czech Republic	23–15	21–33
Russia	63–44	Lithuania	30–22	33–22
Bosnia and Herzegovina	62–61	Iceland	33–32	29–29
Austria	56–54	Norway	28–26	28–28
Montenegro	52–57	Belarus	28–27	24–30

==== First leg ====
7 June 2014; 16:45	Poland	25–24	Germany	Ergo Arena, Gdańsk; Attendance: 10,731; Referees: Horáček, Novotný (CZE)
7 June 2014; 16:45	Jurkiewicz 7	(9–12)	Kraus 5	Ergo Arena, Gdańsk; Attendance: 10,731; Referees: Horáček, Novotný (CZE)
7 June 2014; 16:45	3× (yellow card) 3× (suspension)	Report	3× (yellow card) 4× (suspension)	Ergo Arena, Gdańsk; Attendance: 10,731; Referees: Horáček, Novotný (CZE)

7 June 2014; 18:00	Romania	24–25	Sweden	Dinamo Polyvalent Hall, Bucharest; Attendance: 1,800; Referees: Nikolov, Nachevski (MKD)
7 June 2014; 18:00	Ghionea 8	(9–8)	Petersen 6	Dinamo Polyvalent Hall, Bucharest; Attendance: 1,800; Referees: Nikolov, Nachevski (MKD)
7 June 2014; 18:00	4× (yellow card) 6× (suspension)	Report	4× (yellow card) 5× (suspension)	Dinamo Polyvalent Hall, Bucharest; Attendance: 1,800; Referees: Nikolov, Nachevski (MKD)

7 June 2014; 18:00	Russia	30–22	Lithuania	SC V.P. Suchareva, Perm; Attendance: 1,500; Referees: Pavićević, Ražnatović (MNE)
7 June 2014; 18:00	Kovalev, Shelmenko 6	(14–11)	Malašinskas 6	SC V.P. Suchareva, Perm; Attendance: 1,500; Referees: Pavićević, Ražnatović (MNE)
7 June 2014; 18:00	3× (yellow card) 1× (suspension)	Report	3× (yellow card) 2× (suspension)	SC V.P. Suchareva, Perm; Attendance: 1,500; Referees: Pavićević, Ražnatović (MNE)

7 June 2014; 19:00	Greece	25–27	Macedonia	Liossion Indor Arena, Athens; Attendance: 1,500; Referees: Geipel, Helbig (GER)
7 June 2014; 19:00	Marango 4	(12–13)	K. Lazarov 7	Liossion Indor Arena, Athens; Attendance: 1,500; Referees: Geipel, Helbig (GER)
7 June 2014; 19:00	3× (yellow card) 1× (suspension)	Report	2× (yellow card) 2× (suspension)	Liossion Indor Arena, Athens; Attendance: 1,500; Referees: Geipel, Helbig (GER)

7 June 2014; 19:45	Austria	28–26	Norway	Albert Schultz Eishalle, Vienna; Attendance: 5,000; Referees: Gubica, Milošević (CRO)
7 June 2014; 19:45	Santos 7	(15–16)	Bjørnsen 8	Albert Schultz Eishalle, Vienna; Attendance: 5,000; Referees: Gubica, Milošević (CRO)
7 June 2014; 19:45	3× (yellow card) 3× (suspension)	Report	3× (yellow card) 2× (suspension)	Albert Schultz Eishalle, Vienna; Attendance: 5,000; Referees: Gubica, Milošević (CRO)

7 June 2014; 20:15	Bosnia and Herzegovina	33–32	Iceland	Dvorana Mirza Delibašić, Sarajevo; Attendance: 3,250; Referees: Dinu, Din (ROU)
7 June 2014; 20:15	Prce 10	(14–17)	Petersson 7	Dvorana Mirza Delibašić, Sarajevo; Attendance: 3,250; Referees: Dinu, Din (ROU)
7 June 2014; 20:15	2× (yellow card) 3× (suspension)	Report	3× (yellow card) 5× (suspension)	Dvorana Mirza Delibašić, Sarajevo; Attendance: 3,250; Referees: Dinu, Din (ROU)

7 June 2014; 21:00	Serbia	23–15	Czech Republic	Čair Sports Center, Niš; Attendance: 3,200; Referees: Zotin, Volodkov (RUS)
7 June 2014; 21:00	Ilić 7	(13–6)	Strzinek 6	Čair Sports Center, Niš; Attendance: 3,200; Referees: Zotin, Volodkov (RUS)
7 June 2014; 21:00	3× (yellow card) 3× (suspension) 1× (red card)	Report	3× (yellow card) 1× (suspension) 1× (red card)	Čair Sports Center, Niš; Attendance: 3,200; Referees: Zotin, Volodkov (RUS)

8 June 2014; 14:30	Hungary	25–22	Slovenia	Veszprém Aréna, Veszprém; Attendance: 5,019; Referees: Stoļarovs, Līcis (LAT)
8 June 2014; 14:30	Harsányi 9	(16–15)	Gajić 9	Veszprém Aréna, Veszprém; Attendance: 5,019; Referees: Stoļarovs, Līcis (LAT)
8 June 2014; 14:30	2× (yellow card) 5× (suspension)	Report	2× (yellow card) 5× (suspension)	Veszprém Aréna, Veszprém; Attendance: 5,019; Referees: Stoļarovs, Līcis (LAT)

8 June 2014; 20:00	Montenegro	28–27	Belarus	Morača Sports Center, Podgorica; Attendance: 2,300; Referees: Brunovský, Čanda (SVK)
8 June 2014; 20:00	Melić 6	(10–14)	Rutenka 9	Morača Sports Center, Podgorica; Attendance: 2,300; Referees: Brunovský, Čanda (SVK)
8 June 2014; 20:00	3× (yellow card) 4× (suspension)	Report	2× (yellow card) 5× (suspension)	Morača Sports Center, Podgorica; Attendance: 2,300; Referees: Brunovský, Čanda (SVK)

==== Second leg ====
14 June 2014; 13:50	Czech Republic	33–21	Serbia	Sportovní hala Vodova, Brno; Attendance: 2,700; Referees: Dentz, Reibel (FRA)
14 June 2014; 13:50	Jurka, Motl 9	(18–8)	Nikčević, Rnić 4	Sportovní hala Vodova, Brno; Attendance: 2,700; Referees: Dentz, Reibel (FRA)
14 June 2014; 13:50	3× (yellow card) 3× (suspension)	Report	3× (yellow card) 3× (suspension)	Sportovní hala Vodova, Brno; Attendance: 2,700; Referees: Dentz, Reibel (FRA)

Czech Republic won 48–44 on aggregate.

14 June 2014; 15:00	Norway	28–28	Austria	Sotra Arena, Sotra; Attendance: 2,500; Referees: Krstić, Ljubić (SLO)
14 June 2014; 15:00	Hansen 8	(13–17)	Bozovic, Žiūra 6	Sotra Arena, Sotra; Attendance: 2,500; Referees: Krstić, Ljubić (SLO)
14 June 2014; 15:00	3× (yellow card) 3× (suspension)	Report	3× (yellow card) 4× (suspension)	Sotra Arena, Sotra; Attendance: 2,500; Referees: Krstić, Ljubić (SLO)

Austria won 56–54 on aggregate.

14 June 2014; 15:15	Germany	28–29	Poland	GETEC Arena, Magdeburg; Attendance: 6,579; Referees: Elíasson, Pálsson (ISL)
14 June 2014; 15:15	Gensheimer, Glandorf 7	(14–10)	Bielecki 7	GETEC Arena, Magdeburg; Attendance: 6,579; Referees: Elíasson, Pálsson (ISL)
14 June 2014; 15:15	3× (yellow card) 4× (suspension)	Report	3× (yellow card) 7× (suspension)	GETEC Arena, Magdeburg; Attendance: 6,579; Referees: Elíasson, Pálsson (ISL)

Poland won 54–52 on aggregate.

14 June 2014; 16:00	Lithuania	22–33	Russia	Zalgiris Arena, Kaunas; Attendance: 2,105; Referees: Caçador, Nicolau (POR)
14 June 2014; 16:00	Babarskas 8	(13–13)	Evdokimov, Atman 5	Zalgiris Arena, Kaunas; Attendance: 2,105; Referees: Caçador, Nicolau (POR)
14 June 2014; 16:00	3× (yellow card) 3× (suspension)	Report	2× (yellow card) 2× (suspension)	Zalgiris Arena, Kaunas; Attendance: 2,105; Referees: Caçador, Nicolau (POR)

Russia won 63–44 on aggregate.

15 June 2014; 15:15	Sweden	27–21	Romania	Scandinavium, Gothenburg; Attendance: 5,500; Referees: Lorente, Serradilla (ESP)
15 June 2014; 15:15	Ekberg 8	(15–7)	Ghionea 7	Scandinavium, Gothenburg; Attendance: 5,500; Referees: Lorente, Serradilla (ESP)
15 June 2014; 15:15	3× (yellow card) 5× (suspension)	Report	3× (yellow card) 2× (suspension)	Scandinavium, Gothenburg; Attendance: 5,500; Referees: Lorente, Serradilla (ESP)

Sweden won 52–45 on aggregate.

15 June 2014; 17:00	Slovenia	32–26	Hungary	Red Hall, Velenje; Attendance: 2,100; Referees: Kurtagic, Wetterwik (SWE)
15 June 2014; 17:00	Gajić 9	(13–16)	Nagy 6	Red Hall, Velenje; Attendance: 2,100; Referees: Kurtagic, Wetterwik (SWE)
15 June 2014; 17:00	3× (yellow card) 3× (suspension)	Report	3× (yellow card) 5× (suspension)	Red Hall, Velenje; Attendance: 2,100; Referees: Kurtagic, Wetterwik (SWE)

Slovenia won 54–51 on aggregate.

15 June 2014; 17:30	Iceland	29–29	Bosnia and Herzegovina	Laugardalshöll, Reykjavík; Attendance: 2,800; Referees: Dobrovits, Tájok (HUN)
15 June 2014; 17:30	Sigurðsson 8	(10–15)	Prce 7	Laugardalshöll, Reykjavík; Attendance: 2,800; Referees: Dobrovits, Tájok (HUN)
15 June 2014; 17:30	2× (yellow card) 4× (suspension)	Report	2× (yellow card) 6× (suspension)	Laugardalshöll, Reykjavík; Attendance: 2,800; Referees: Dobrovits, Tájok (HUN)

Bosnia and Herzegovina won 62–61 on aggregate.

15 June 2014; 18:00	Belarus	30–24	Montenegro	Minsk-Arena, Minsk; Attendance: 7,281; Referees: Stark, Ştefan (ROU)
15 June 2014; 18:00	Pukhouski, Rutenka 7	(16–9)	Melić 7	Minsk-Arena, Minsk; Attendance: 7,281; Referees: Stark, Ştefan (ROU)
15 June 2014; 18:00	3× (yellow card) 5× (suspension)	Report	3× (yellow card) 3× (suspension)	Minsk-Arena, Minsk; Attendance: 7,281; Referees: Stark, Ştefan (ROU)

Belarus won 57–52 on aggregate.

15 June 2014; 20:00	Macedonia	35–23	Greece	Boris Trajkovski Sports Center, Skopje; Attendance: 6,963; Referees: Horáček, Novotný (CZE)
15 June 2014; 20:00	Lazarov 10	(19–9)	Tsatso 5	Boris Trajkovski Sports Center, Skopje; Attendance: 6,963; Referees: Horáček, Novotný (CZE)
15 June 2014; 20:00	3× (yellow card) 2× (suspension)	Report	3× (yellow card) 1× (suspension)	Boris Trajkovski Sports Center, Skopje; Attendance: 6,963; Referees: Horáček, Novotný (CZE)

Macedonia won 62–48 on aggregate.
