= 2018 European Men's Handball Championship qualification =

This article describes the qualification for the 2018 European Men's Handball Championship.

== Qualification system ==
38 teams had registered for participation. 37 teams competed for 15 places at the final tournament in 2 distinct Qualification Phases. In each phase, the teams were divided into several pots according to their positions in the EHF National Team Ranking.

== Qualification Phase 1 ==
=== Seeding ===
The draw for the qualification round was held on 22 July 2014 in Vienna, Austria. The group winners advanced to the playoffs.

Pot 1	Pot 2	Pot 3
Greece; Estonia; Romania	Italy; Belgium; Luxembourg	Cyprus; Georgia; Kosovo

All times are local.

=== Group 1 ===
Pos	Team	Pld	W	D	L	GF	GA	GD	Pts	Qualification
1	Belgium	4	3	0	1	111	91	+20	6 (Note: Belgium 55–54 Greece)	Playoffs
2	Greece	4	3	0	1	104	97	+7	6	
3	Cyprus	4	0	0	4	79	106	−27	0	

Source: Eurohandball
Rules for classification: 1) points; 2) head-to-head points; 3) head-to-head goal difference; 4) head-to-head number of goals scored; 5) goal difference.
Notes:

30 October 2014; 19:30	Greece	27–25	Cyprus	Dimitris Tofalos Arena, Patras; Attendance: 500; Referees: Jović, Arnautović (BIH)
30 October 2014; 19:30	Papadopoulos 10	(16–11)	Argyrou 8	Dimitris Tofalos Arena, Patras; Attendance: 500; Referees: Jović, Arnautović (BIH)
30 October 2014; 19:30	3× (yellow card) 3× (suspension)	Report	3× (yellow card) 3× (suspension)	Dimitris Tofalos Arena, Patras; Attendance: 500; Referees: Jović, Arnautović (BIH)

2 November 2014; 19:00	Cyprus	17–23	Greece	Eleftheria Indoor Hall, Nicosia; Attendance: 300; Referees: Nabokau, Kulik (BLR)
2 November 2014; 19:00	Argyrou 7	(9–12)	Papadopoulos 4	Eleftheria Indoor Hall, Nicosia; Attendance: 300; Referees: Nabokau, Kulik (BLR)
2 November 2014; 19:00	3× (yellow card) 2× (suspension)	Report	3× (yellow card) 3× (suspension)	Eleftheria Indoor Hall, Nicosia; Attendance: 300; Referees: Nabokau, Kulik (BLR)

29 April 2015; 19:30	Cyprus	17–26	Belgium	Eleftheria Indoor Hall, Nicosia; Attendance: 300; Referees: Cindrić, Gonzurek (CRO)
29 April 2015; 19:30	Argyrou 10	(8–15)	Valkenborgh 7	Eleftheria Indoor Hall, Nicosia; Attendance: 300; Referees: Cindrić, Gonzurek (CRO)
29 April 2015; 19:30	3× (yellow card) 3× (suspension)	Report	3× (yellow card) 3× (suspension)	Eleftheria Indoor Hall, Nicosia; Attendance: 300; Referees: Cindrić, Gonzurek (CRO)

2 May 2015; 20:00	Belgium	30–20	Cyprus	Hall Omnisports "La Préalle", Herstal; Attendance: 1,300; Referees: Wills, Colin (GBR)
2 May 2015; 20:00	D. Kedziora 7	(12–7)	Nikiforou 4	Hall Omnisports "La Préalle", Herstal; Attendance: 1,300; Referees: Wills, Colin (GBR)
2 May 2015; 20:00	3× (yellow card) 4× (suspension)	Report	3× (yellow card) 2× (suspension)	Hall Omnisports "La Préalle", Herstal; Attendance: 1,300; Referees: Wills, Colin (GBR)

10 June 2015; 20:00	Belgium	30–25	Greece	Sporthal Alverberg, Hasselt; Attendance: 1,600; Referees: Vešović, Mitrović (MNE)
10 June 2015; 20:00	Kedziora, De Beule 6	(16–17)	Papadopoulos 8	Sporthal Alverberg, Hasselt; Attendance: 1,600; Referees: Vešović, Mitrović (MNE)
10 June 2015; 20:00	3× (yellow card) 5× (suspension)	Report	3× (yellow card) 4× (suspension)	Sporthal Alverberg, Hasselt; Attendance: 1,600; Referees: Vešović, Mitrović (MNE)

14 June 2015; 19:30	Greece	29–25	Belgium	Mikra 3, Thessaloniki; Attendance: 700; Referees: Martins, Martins (POR)
14 June 2015; 19:30	Tzoufras 8	(15–11)	Kedziora 5	Mikra 3, Thessaloniki; Attendance: 700; Referees: Martins, Martins (POR)
14 June 2015; 19:30	3× (yellow card) 3× (suspension)	Report	2× (yellow card) 4× (suspension)	Mikra 3, Thessaloniki; Attendance: 700; Referees: Martins, Martins (POR)

=== Group 2 ===
Pos	Team	Pld	W	D	L	GF	GA	GD	Pts	Qualification
1	Luxembourg	4	2	0	2	100	94	+6	4	Playoffs
2	Estonia	4	2	0	2	112	110	+2	4	
3	Georgia	4	2	0	2	92	100	−8	4	

Source: Eurohandball
Rules for classification: 1) points; 2) head-to-head points; 3) head-to-head goal difference; 4) head-to-head number of goals scored; 5) goal difference.

29 October 2014; 20:00	Estonia	28–26	Georgia	Kalevi Spordihall, Tallinn; Attendance: 550; Referees: Aliyev, Aghakishiyev (AZE)
29 October 2014; 20:00	Järve, Pinnonen 5	(16–15)	Rusia 10	Kalevi Spordihall, Tallinn; Attendance: 550; Referees: Aliyev, Aghakishiyev (AZE)
29 October 2014; 20:00	3× (yellow card) 3× (suspension)	Report	3× (yellow card) 6× (suspension)	Kalevi Spordihall, Tallinn; Attendance: 550; Referees: Aliyev, Aghakishiyev (AZE)

2 November 2014; 18:00	Georgia	29–27	Estonia	Tbilisi Sports Palace, Tbilisi; Attendance: 2,300; Referees: Argyridis, Mouttas (CYP)
2 November 2014; 18:00	Rusia 8	(15–14)	Pinnonen 7	Tbilisi Sports Palace, Tbilisi; Attendance: 2,300; Referees: Argyridis, Mouttas (CYP)
2 November 2014; 18:00	3× (yellow card) 5× (suspension)	Report	3× (yellow card) 2× (suspension)	Tbilisi Sports Palace, Tbilisi; Attendance: 2,300; Referees: Argyridis, Mouttas (CYP)

30 April 2015; 18:00	Georgia	17–16	Luxembourg	Kutaisi Sport Palace, Kutaisi; Attendance: 1,500; Referees: Nabokau, Kulik (BLR)
30 April 2015; 18:00	Chanturia 7	(11–7)	Meis 4	Kutaisi Sport Palace, Kutaisi; Attendance: 1,500; Referees: Nabokau, Kulik (BLR)
30 April 2015; 18:00	3× (yellow card) 5× (suspension)	Report	3× (yellow card) 2× (suspension)	Kutaisi Sport Palace, Kutaisi; Attendance: 1,500; Referees: Nabokau, Kulik (BLR)

3 May 2015; 18:00	Luxembourg	29–20	Georgia	D'Coque, Luxembourg; Attendance: 1,000; Referees: Azemi, Beqiri (KOS)
3 May 2015; 18:00	Hoffmann 7	(12–11)	Tsitelishvili 8	D'Coque, Luxembourg; Attendance: 1,000; Referees: Azemi, Beqiri (KOS)
3 May 2015; 18:00	3× (yellow card) 7× (suspension)	Report	3× (yellow card) 2× (suspension)	D'Coque, Luxembourg; Attendance: 1,000; Referees: Azemi, Beqiri (KOS)

10 June 2015; 19:30	Luxembourg	26–31	Estonia	D'Coque, Luxembourg; Attendance: 800; Referees: Jović, Arnautović (BIH)
10 June 2015; 19:30	Bardina 6	(13–14)	three players 5	D'Coque, Luxembourg; Attendance: 800; Referees: Jović, Arnautović (BIH)
10 June 2015; 19:30	3× (yellow card) 3× (suspension)	Report	2× (yellow card) 4× (suspension)	D'Coque, Luxembourg; Attendance: 800; Referees: Jović, Arnautović (BIH)

13 June 2015; 20:00	Estonia	26–29	Luxembourg	Viljandi Sporthall, Viljandi; Attendance: 600; Referees: Samuelsen, Guðjónsson (FAR)
13 June 2015; 20:00	Jaanimaa 8	(17–14)	Bardina 8	Viljandi Sporthall, Viljandi; Attendance: 600; Referees: Samuelsen, Guðjónsson (FAR)
13 June 2015; 20:00	2× (yellow card) 5× (suspension)	Report	3× (yellow card) 7× (suspension)	Viljandi Sporthall, Viljandi; Attendance: 600; Referees: Samuelsen, Guðjónsson (FAR)

=== Group 3 ===
Pos	Team	Pld	W	D	L	GF	GA	GD	Pts	Qualification
1	Romania	4	4	0	0	138	87	+51	8	Playoffs
2	Italy	4	2	0	2	111	120	−9	4	
3	Kosovo	4	0	0	4	88	130	−42	0	

Source: Eurohandball
Rules for classification: 1) points; 2) head-to-head points; 3) head-to-head goal difference; 4) head-to-head number of goals scored; 5) goal difference.

29 October 2014; 18:00	Romania	36–24	Kosovo	Dinamo Polyvalent Hall, Bucharest; Attendance: 1,000; Referees: Mertinian, Syrepisios (GRE)
29 October 2014; 18:00	Stavrositu 6	(17–10)	Hoxha 8	Dinamo Polyvalent Hall, Bucharest; Attendance: 1,000; Referees: Mertinian, Syrepisios (GRE)
29 October 2014; 18:00	3× (yellow card) 3× (suspension)	Report	3× (yellow card) 4× (suspension)	Dinamo Polyvalent Hall, Bucharest; Attendance: 1,000; Referees: Mertinian, Syrepisios (GRE)

1 November 2014; 18:00	Kosovo	16–30	Romania	Pallati i Rinisë dhe Sporteve, Pristina; Attendance: 1,200; Referees: Dvorský, Karlubík (SVK)
1 November 2014; 18:00	Dedaj 4	(10–15)	Ghionea 8	Pallati i Rinisë dhe Sporteve, Pristina; Attendance: 1,200; Referees: Dvorský, Karlubík (SVK)
1 November 2014; 18:00	3× (yellow card) 5× (suspension)	Report	3× (yellow card) 4× (suspension)	Pallati i Rinisë dhe Sporteve, Pristina; Attendance: 1,200; Referees: Dvorský, Karlubík (SVK)

29 April 2015; 19:30	Kosovo	22–29	Italy	Pallati i Rinisë dhe Sporteve, Pristina; Attendance: 1,000; Referees: Sirbu, Suponicov (MDA)
29 April 2015; 19:30	Kabashi 8	(12–17)	Turkovic 8	Pallati i Rinisë dhe Sporteve, Pristina; Attendance: 1,000; Referees: Sirbu, Suponicov (MDA)
29 April 2015; 19:30	3× (yellow card) 4× (suspension)	Report	3× (yellow card) 6× (suspension) 1× (red card)	Pallati i Rinisë dhe Sporteve, Pristina; Attendance: 1,000; Referees: Sirbu, Suponicov (MDA)

3 May 2015; 18:00	Italy	35–26	Kosovo	PalaGolfo, Follonica; Attendance: 2,000; Referees: Jerlecki, Labun (POL)
3 May 2015; 18:00	Turkovic 11	(18–12)	three players 5	PalaGolfo, Follonica; Attendance: 2,000; Referees: Jerlecki, Labun (POL)
3 May 2015; 18:00	3× (yellow card) 5× (suspension)	Report	3× (yellow card) 5× (suspension)	PalaGolfo, Follonica; Attendance: 2,000; Referees: Jerlecki, Labun (POL)

10 June 2015; 20:30	Italy	22–28	Romania	Pala San Giacomo, Conversano; Attendance: 2,800; Referees: Boričić, Marković (SRB)
10 June 2015; 20:30	Maione 6	(10–13)	Novanc 7	Pala San Giacomo, Conversano; Attendance: 2,800; Referees: Boričić, Marković (SRB)
10 June 2015; 20:30	3× (yellow card) 4× (suspension)	Report	3× (yellow card) 4× (suspension)	Pala San Giacomo, Conversano; Attendance: 2,800; Referees: Boričić, Marković (SRB)

14 June 2015; 17:00	Romania	44–25	Italy	Sala Polivalenta Resita, Reșița; Attendance: 1,512; Referees: Bounouara, Sami (FRA)
14 June 2015; 17:00	Csepreghi 8	(23–13)	Turkovic 4	Sala Polivalenta Resita, Reșița; Attendance: 1,512; Referees: Bounouara, Sami (FRA)
14 June 2015; 17:00	3× (yellow card) 6× (suspension)	Report	3× (yellow card) 4× (suspension)	Sala Polivalenta Resita, Reșița; Attendance: 1,512; Referees: Bounouara, Sami (FRA)

== Playoffs ==
The draw for the playoffs was held on 23 June 2015 in Vienna, Austria. The winners advanced to the second phase.

Team 1	Agg.	Team 2	1st leg	2nd leg
Luxembourg	52–55	Finland	23–28	29–27
Israel	48–62	Romania	27–30	21–32
Turkey	50–66	Belgium	28–37	22–29

All times are local.

=== Matches ===
7 April 2016; 19:00	Luxembourg	23–28	Finland	d'Coque, Luxembourg City; Attendance: 1,100; Referees: Guðjónsson (ISL), Samuelsen (FAR)
7 April 2016; 19:00	three players 4	(14–17)	Tamminen 11	d'Coque, Luxembourg City; Attendance: 1,100; Referees: Guðjónsson (ISL), Samuelsen (FAR)
7 April 2016; 19:00	3× (yellow card) 7× (suspension)	Report	3× (yellow card) 5× (suspension) 1× (red card)	d'Coque, Luxembourg City; Attendance: 1,100; Referees: Guðjónsson (ISL), Samuelsen (FAR)

9 April 2016; 16:00	Finland	27–29	Luxembourg	Sisu Arena, Karis; Attendance: 650; Referees: Barysas, Petrušis (LTU)
9 April 2016; 16:00	Tamminen 11	(12–11)	Muller 9	Sisu Arena, Karis; Attendance: 650; Referees: Barysas, Petrušis (LTU)
9 April 2016; 16:00	2× (yellow card) 3× (suspension)	Report	4× (yellow card) 7× (suspension)	Sisu Arena, Karis; Attendance: 650; Referees: Barysas, Petrušis (LTU)

Finland won 55–52 on aggregate.

6 April 2016; 19:45	Israel	27–30	Romania	Drive in Arena, Tel Aviv; Attendance: 1,000; Referees: Rutkovskis, Dzērve (LAT)
6 April 2016; 19:45	Tutkenitz 6	(15–13)	Ghionea 6	Drive in Arena, Tel Aviv; Attendance: 1,000; Referees: Rutkovskis, Dzērve (LAT)
6 April 2016; 19:45	3× (yellow card) 3× (suspension)	Report	3× (yellow card) 4× (suspension)	Drive in Arena, Tel Aviv; Attendance: 1,000; Referees: Rutkovskis, Dzērve (LAT)

10 April 2016; 18:00	Romania	32–21	Israel	Polyvalent Hall, Călărași; Attendance: 1,600; Referees: Cvetko, Kavalar (SLO)
10 April 2016; 18:00	four players 4	(17–10)	Tutkenitz 5	Polyvalent Hall, Călărași; Attendance: 1,600; Referees: Cvetko, Kavalar (SLO)
10 April 2016; 18:00	3× (yellow card) 3× (suspension)	Report	3× (yellow card) 4× (suspension)	Polyvalent Hall, Călărași; Attendance: 1,600; Referees: Cvetko, Kavalar (SLO)

Romania won 62–48 on aggregate.

6 April 2016; 19:00	Turkey	28–37	Belgium	Spor Salonu, Rize; Attendance: 2,100; Referees: Brodbeck, Reich (GER)
6 April 2016; 19:00	Döne 7	(13–16)	D. Kedziora 13	Spor Salonu, Rize; Attendance: 2,100; Referees: Brodbeck, Reich (GER)
6 April 2016; 19:00	3× (yellow card) 6× (suspension) 1× (red card)	Report	3× (yellow card) 7× (suspension)	Spor Salonu, Rize; Attendance: 2,100; Referees: Brodbeck, Reich (GER)

9 April 2016; 20:00	Belgium	29–22	Turkey	Country Hall Ethias Liège, Liège; Attendance: 2,700; Referees: Hájek, Macho (CZE)
9 April 2016; 20:00	B. Kedziora, D. Kedziora 5	(15–10)	Özbahar 9	Country Hall Ethias Liège, Liège; Attendance: 2,700; Referees: Hájek, Macho (CZE)
9 April 2016; 20:00	2× (yellow card) 5× (suspension)	Report	3× (yellow card) 6× (suspension)	Country Hall Ethias Liège, Liège; Attendance: 2,700; Referees: Hájek, Macho (CZE)

Belgium won 66–50 on aggregate.

== Qualification Phase 2 ==
The draw was held on 14 April 2016 in Dubrovnik. The teams were split into seven groups of four teams. The top two ranked teams from each group and the best third ranked team qualified for the final tournament.

Pot 1	Pot 2	Pot 3	Pot 4
France; Spain; Denmark; Poland; Germany; Sweden; Iceland	Macedonia; Russia; Norway; Hungary; Slovenia; Belarus; Austria	Serbia; Czech Republic; Montenegro; Bosnia and Herzegovina; Netherlands; Portugal; Lithuania	Slovakia; Latvia; Ukraine; Switzerland; Romania; Belgium; Finland

All times are local.

=== Group 1 ===
Pos	Team	Pld	W	D	L	GF	GA	GD	Pts	Qualification
1	Denmark	6	5	1	0	194	135	+59	11	Final tournament
2	Hungary	6	4	1	1	174	156	+18	9	Final tournament
3	Netherlands	6	2	0	4	155	179	−24	4	
4	Latvia	6	0	0	6	129	182	−53	0	

Source: Eurohandball
Rules for classification: 1) points; 2) head-to-head points; 3) head-to-head goal difference; 4) head-to-head number of goals scored; 5) goal difference.

2 November 2016; 18:00	Hungary	24–16	Latvia	Continental Aréna, Nyíregyháza; Attendance: 2,800; Referees: Johansson, Kliko (SWE)
2 November 2016; 18:00	Harsányi 8	(11–6)	Lielais, Pavlovičs 4	Continental Aréna, Nyíregyháza; Attendance: 2,800; Referees: Johansson, Kliko (SWE)
2 November 2016; 18:00	2× (yellow card) 3× (suspension)	Report	3× (yellow card) 6× (suspension) 1× (red card)	Continental Aréna, Nyíregyháza; Attendance: 2,800; Referees: Johansson, Kliko (SWE)

3 November 2016; 20:30	Denmark	29–20	Netherlands	Trefor Arena, Brøndby; Attendance: 5,119; Referees: Kristiansen, Pettersen (NOR)
3 November 2016; 20:30	Hansen 8	(15–12)	Schagen, Steins 7	Trefor Arena, Brøndby; Attendance: 5,119; Referees: Kristiansen, Pettersen (NOR)
3 November 2016; 20:30	3× (yellow card) 3× (suspension)	Report	3× (yellow card) 4× (suspension) 1× (red card)	Trefor Arena, Brøndby; Attendance: 5,119; Referees: Kristiansen, Pettersen (NOR)

6 November 2016; 15:00	Netherlands	27–28	Hungary	Maaspoort Sports and Events, 's-Hertogenbosch; Attendance: 2,000; Referees: Dentz, Reibel (FRA)
6 November 2016; 15:00	Steins 9	(17–13)	T. Iváncsik 6	Maaspoort Sports and Events, 's-Hertogenbosch; Attendance: 2,000; Referees: Dentz, Reibel (FRA)
6 November 2016; 15:00	3× (yellow card) 3× (suspension)	Report	3× (yellow card) 2× (suspension)	Maaspoort Sports and Events, 's-Hertogenbosch; Attendance: 2,000; Referees: Dentz, Reibel (FRA)

6 November 2016; 17:10	Latvia	23–36	Denmark	Vidzemes Olympic Centre, Valmiera; Attendance: 1,380; Referees: Baďura, Ondogrecula (SVK)
6 November 2016; 17:10	Pavlovičs 5	(11–18)	Andersson, Svan 7	Vidzemes Olympic Centre, Valmiera; Attendance: 1,380; Referees: Baďura, Ondogrecula (SVK)
6 November 2016; 17:10	3× (yellow card) 4× (suspension)	Report	2× (yellow card) 4× (suspension)	Vidzemes Olympic Centre, Valmiera; Attendance: 1,380; Referees: Baďura, Ondogrecula (SVK)

3 May 2017; 19:35	Latvia	27–29	Netherlands	Vidzemes Olympic Centre, Valmiera; Attendance: 1,000; Referees: Buache, Meyer (SUI)
3 May 2017; 19:35	Krištopāns 8	(13–15)	Baart 7	Vidzemes Olympic Centre, Valmiera; Attendance: 1,000; Referees: Buache, Meyer (SUI)
3 May 2017; 19:35	3× (yellow card) 1× (suspension)	Report	3× (yellow card) 5× (suspension)	Vidzemes Olympic Centre, Valmiera; Attendance: 1,000; Referees: Buache, Meyer (SUI)

4 May 2017; 20:00	Hungary	25–25	Denmark	László Papp Budapest Sports Arena, Budapest; Attendance: 6,700; Referees: Santos, Fonseca (POR)
4 May 2017; 20:00	Jamali, Lékai 7	(14–11)	three players 4	László Papp Budapest Sports Arena, Budapest; Attendance: 6,700; Referees: Santos, Fonseca (POR)
4 May 2017; 20:00	3× (yellow card) 6× (suspension) 1× (red card)	Report	3× (yellow card) 3× (suspension)	László Papp Budapest Sports Arena, Budapest; Attendance: 6,700; Referees: Santos, Fonseca (POR)

7 May 2017; 14:00	Netherlands	25–24	Latvia	Sporthal Angelslo, Emmen; Attendance: 1,100; Referees: Mandák, Rudinský (SVK)
7 May 2017; 14:00	Remer 6	(13–14)	Jurdžs, Krištopāns 6	Sporthal Angelslo, Emmen; Attendance: 1,100; Referees: Mandák, Rudinský (SVK)
7 May 2017; 14:00	3× (yellow card) 2× (suspension) 1× (red card)	Report	1× (yellow card) 6× (suspension)	Sporthal Angelslo, Emmen; Attendance: 1,100; Referees: Mandák, Rudinský (SVK)

7 May 2017; 20:30	Denmark	35–27	Hungary	Ceres Arena, Aarhus; Attendance: 4,872; Referees: Horáček, Novotný (CZE)
7 May 2017; 20:30	Hansen 8	(18–17)	Bodó, Iváncsik 5	Ceres Arena, Aarhus; Attendance: 4,872; Referees: Horáček, Novotný (CZE)
7 May 2017; 20:30	1× (yellow card) 4× (suspension)	Report	2× (yellow card) 5× (suspension)	Ceres Arena, Aarhus; Attendance: 4,872; Referees: Horáček, Novotný (CZE)

14 June 2017; 19:30	Netherlands	24–36	Denmark	Topsportcentrum, Almere; Attendance: 1,250; Referees: Mitrevski, Todorovski (MKD)
14 June 2017; 19:30	Remer 4	(10–18)	Damgaard, Lindberg 7	Topsportcentrum, Almere; Attendance: 1,250; Referees: Mitrevski, Todorovski (MKD)
14 June 2017; 19:30	3× (yellow card) 4× (suspension)	Report	3× (yellow card) 3× (suspension)	Topsportcentrum, Almere; Attendance: 1,250; Referees: Mitrevski, Todorovski (MKD)

15 June 2017; 19:35	Latvia	23–35	Hungary	Vidzemes Olympic Centre, Valmiera; Attendance: 900; Referees: Kristiansen, Pettersen (NOR)
15 June 2017; 19:35	Jurdžs 5	(9–15)	Juhász, Vilovski 7	Vidzemes Olympic Centre, Valmiera; Attendance: 900; Referees: Kristiansen, Pettersen (NOR)
15 June 2017; 19:35	3× (yellow card) 5× (suspension)	Report	3× (yellow card) 6× (suspension)	Vidzemes Olympic Centre, Valmiera; Attendance: 900; Referees: Kristiansen, Pettersen (NOR)

18 June 2017; 19:15	Hungary	35–30	Netherlands	Veszprém Aréna, Veszprém; Attendance: 5,019; Referees: Konjičanin, Konjičanin (BIH)
18 June 2017; 19:15	Győri 10	(16–13)	Haenen, Schagen 6	Veszprém Aréna, Veszprém; Attendance: 5,019; Referees: Konjičanin, Konjičanin (BIH)
18 June 2017; 19:15	3× (yellow card) 5× (suspension)	Report	3× (yellow card) 3× (suspension)	Veszprém Aréna, Veszprém; Attendance: 5,019; Referees: Konjičanin, Konjičanin (BIH)

18 June 2017; 20:15	Denmark	33–16	Latvia	Sydbank Arena, Kolding; Attendance: 3,395; Referees: Sigurjónsson, Pétursson (ISL)
18 June 2017; 20:15	Larsen 6	(14–5)	Lielais 6	Sydbank Arena, Kolding; Attendance: 3,395; Referees: Sigurjónsson, Pétursson (ISL)
18 June 2017; 20:15	2× (yellow card) 3× (suspension)	Report	2× (yellow card) 7× (suspension)	Sydbank Arena, Kolding; Attendance: 3,395; Referees: Sigurjónsson, Pétursson (ISL)

=== Group 2 ===
Pos	Team	Pld	W	D	L	GF	GA	GD	Pts	Qualification
1	Belarus	6	3	2	1	177	152	+25	8 (Note: Serbia 54–63 Belarus)	Final tournament
2	Serbia	6	3	2	1	175	173	+2	8	Final tournament
3	Romania	6	2	0	4	151	160	−9	4 (Note: Romania 59–55 Poland)	
4	Poland	6	1	2	3	171	189	−18	4	

Source: Eurohandball
Rules for classification: 1) points; 2) head-to-head points; 3) head-to-head goal difference; 4) head-to-head number of goals scored; 5) goal difference.
Notes:

2 November 2016; 19:00	Belarus	23–26	Romania	Sport Palace Uruchye, Minsk; Attendance: 2,700; Referees: Pavićević, Ražnatović (MNE)
2 November 2016; 19:00	Rutenka 5	(10–13)	Ghionea 6	Sport Palace Uruchye, Minsk; Attendance: 2,700; Referees: Pavićević, Ražnatović (MNE)
2 November 2016; 19:00	3× (yellow card) 5× (suspension) 1× (red card)	Report	1× (yellow card) 5× (suspension)	Sport Palace Uruchye, Minsk; Attendance: 2,700; Referees: Pavićević, Ražnatović (MNE)

3 November 2016; 20:00	Poland	32–37	Serbia	Ergo Arena, Gdańsk; Attendance: 10,000; Referees: Zotin, Volodkov (RUS)
3 November 2016; 20:00	Bielecki 6	(14–20)	Nenadić 10	Ergo Arena, Gdańsk; Attendance: 10,000; Referees: Zotin, Volodkov (RUS)
3 November 2016; 20:00	3× (yellow card) 3× (suspension)	Report	3× (yellow card) 4× (suspension)	Ergo Arena, Gdańsk; Attendance: 10,000; Referees: Zotin, Volodkov (RUS)

6 November 2016; 17:00	Serbia	27–36	Belarus	Čair Sports Center, Niš; Attendance: 5,600; Referees: Pichon, Reveret (FRA)
6 November 2016; 17:00	Ðukić 8	(13–20)	Pukhouski 8	Čair Sports Center, Niš; Attendance: 5,600; Referees: Pichon, Reveret (FRA)
6 November 2016; 17:00	3× (yellow card) 5× (suspension)	Report	2× (yellow card) 6× (suspension)	Čair Sports Center, Niš; Attendance: 5,600; Referees: Pichon, Reveret (FRA)

6 November 2016; 20:00	Romania	28–23	Poland	Polyvalent Hall, Cluj-Napoca; Attendance: 5,115; Referees: Erdoğan, Özdeniz (TUR)
6 November 2016; 20:00	Mocanu, Ramba 5	(11–9)	Bielecki 5	Polyvalent Hall, Cluj-Napoca; Attendance: 5,115; Referees: Erdoğan, Özdeniz (TUR)
6 November 2016; 20:00	3× (yellow card) 5× (suspension)	Report	3× (yellow card) 4× (suspension)	Polyvalent Hall, Cluj-Napoca; Attendance: 5,115; Referees: Erdoğan, Özdeniz (TUR)

4 May 2017; 18:00	Belarus	32–23	Poland	Sport Palace Uruchye, Minsk; Attendance: 2,700; Referees: Mažeika, Gatelis (LTU)
4 May 2017; 18:00	Karalek 7	(15–10)	Krajewski 5	Sport Palace Uruchye, Minsk; Attendance: 2,700; Referees: Mažeika, Gatelis (LTU)
4 May 2017; 18:00	3× (yellow card) 4× (suspension)	Report	2× (yellow card) 3× (suspension)	Sport Palace Uruchye, Minsk; Attendance: 2,700; Referees: Mažeika, Gatelis (LTU)

4 May 2017; 20:00	Romania	22–23	Serbia	Lascăr Pană Sports Hall, Baia Mare; Attendance: 2,000; Referees: Madsen, Mortensen (DEN)
4 May 2017; 20:00	Ghionea 8	(9–13)	Nenadić 7	Lascăr Pană Sports Hall, Baia Mare; Attendance: 2,000; Referees: Madsen, Mortensen (DEN)
4 May 2017; 20:00	3× (yellow card) 5× (suspension)	Report	3× (yellow card) 5× (suspension) 1× (red card)	Lascăr Pană Sports Hall, Baia Mare; Attendance: 2,000; Referees: Madsen, Mortensen (DEN)

7 May 2017; 19:00	Poland	27–27	Belarus	Orlen Arena, Płock; Attendance: 3,200; Referees: Jurinović, Mrvica (CRO)
7 May 2017; 19:00	three players 5	(13–15)	Pukhouski 9	Orlen Arena, Płock; Attendance: 3,200; Referees: Jurinović, Mrvica (CRO)
7 May 2017; 19:00	3× (yellow card) 1× (suspension) 1× (red card)	Report	3× (yellow card)	Orlen Arena, Płock; Attendance: 3,200; Referees: Jurinović, Mrvica (CRO)

7 May 2017; 20:00	Serbia	27–22	Romania	Jezero Hall, Kragujevac; Attendance: 3,500; Referees: Brunovský, Čanda (SVK)
7 May 2017; 20:00	Ðukić 5	(16–13)	Onyejekwe 4	Jezero Hall, Kragujevac; Attendance: 3,500; Referees: Brunovský, Čanda (SVK)
7 May 2017; 20:00	1× (yellow card) 6× (suspension)	Report	3× (yellow card) 2× (suspension)	Jezero Hall, Kragujevac; Attendance: 3,500; Referees: Brunovský, Čanda (SVK)

14 June 2017; 20:45	Serbia	34–34	Poland	Čair Sports Center, Niš; Attendance: 4,000; Referees: Sondors, Līcis (LAT)
14 June 2017; 20:45	P. Nenadić 9	(19–19)	Przybylski 8	Čair Sports Center, Niš; Attendance: 4,000; Referees: Sondors, Līcis (LAT)
14 June 2017; 20:45	3× (yellow card) 2× (suspension)	Report	2× (yellow card) 6× (suspension)	Čair Sports Center, Niš; Attendance: 4,000; Referees: Sondors, Līcis (LAT)

15 June 2017; 19:00	Romania	22–32	Belarus	Polyvalent Hall, Craiova; Attendance: 3,200; Referees: Dobrovits, Tájok (HUN)
15 June 2017; 19:00	Grigoraș, Mocanu 5	(11–19)	Pukhouski 7	Polyvalent Hall, Craiova; Attendance: 3,200; Referees: Dobrovits, Tájok (HUN)
15 June 2017; 19:00	2× (yellow card) 2× (suspension)	Report	2× (yellow card) 5× (suspension)	Polyvalent Hall, Craiova; Attendance: 3,200; Referees: Dobrovits, Tájok (HUN)

18 June 2017; 14:30	Poland	32–31	Romania	Ergo Arena, Gdańsk; Attendance: 6,000; Referees: Lopéz, Ramírez (ESP)
18 June 2017; 14:30	Moryto 10	(19–13)	Racoțea 5	Ergo Arena, Gdańsk; Attendance: 6,000; Referees: Lopéz, Ramírez (ESP)
18 June 2017; 14:30	3× (yellow card) 1× (suspension)	Report	3× (yellow card) 1× (suspension)	Ergo Arena, Gdańsk; Attendance: 6,000; Referees: Lopéz, Ramírez (ESP)

18 June 2017; 16:00	Belarus	27–27	Serbia	Sport Palace Uruchye, Minsk; Attendance: 1,900; Referees: Erdoğan, Özdeniz (TUR)
18 June 2017; 16:00	Yurynok 7	(13–10)	Đorđić 9	Sport Palace Uruchye, Minsk; Attendance: 1,900; Referees: Erdoğan, Özdeniz (TUR)
18 June 2017; 16:00	1× (yellow card) 2× (suspension)	Report	3× (yellow card) 3× (suspension)	Sport Palace Uruchye, Minsk; Attendance: 1,900; Referees: Erdoğan, Özdeniz (TUR)

=== Group 3 ===
Pos	Team	Pld	W	D	L	GF	GA	GD	Pts	Qualification
1	Spain	6	6	0	0	202	130	+72	12	Final tournament
2	Austria	6	3	0	3	176	186	−10	6	Final tournament
3	Bosnia and Herzegovina	6	2	0	4	160	162	−2	4	
4	Finland	6	1	0	5	154	214	−60	2	

Source: Eurohandball
Rules for classification: 1) points; 2) head-to-head points; 3) head-to-head goal difference; 4) head-to-head number of goals scored; 5) goal difference.

2 November 2016; 20:25	Austria	27–31	Finland	Arena Nova, Wiener Neustadt; Attendance: 1,500; Referees: Nikolov, Nachevski (MKD)
2 November 2016; 20:25	Weber 5	(16–14)	Tamminen 7	Arena Nova, Wiener Neustadt; Attendance: 1,500; Referees: Nikolov, Nachevski (MKD)
2 November 2016; 20:25	3× (yellow card) 3× (suspension)	Report	4× (yellow card) 3× (suspension)	Arena Nova, Wiener Neustadt; Attendance: 1,500; Referees: Nikolov, Nachevski (MKD)

2 November 2016; 20:30	Spain	30–21	Bosnia and Herzegovina	Polideportivo Huerta del Rey, Valladolid; Attendance: 3,600; Referees: Bonaventura, Bonaventura (FRA)
2 November 2016; 20:30	Rivera 7	(12–6)	Panić 6	Polideportivo Huerta del Rey, Valladolid; Attendance: 3,600; Referees: Bonaventura, Bonaventura (FRA)
2 November 2016; 20:30	2× (yellow card) 3× (suspension)	Report	4× (yellow card) 6× (suspension)	Polideportivo Huerta del Rey, Valladolid; Attendance: 3,600; Referees: Bonaventura, Bonaventura (FRA)

5 November 2016; 14:30	Finland	21–36	Spain	Folksam Arena, Siuntio; Attendance: 1,000; Referees: Brunner, Salah (SUI)
5 November 2016; 14:30	Rönnberg 5	(12–17)	Dujshebaev 7	Folksam Arena, Siuntio; Attendance: 1,000; Referees: Brunner, Salah (SUI)
5 November 2016; 14:30	2× (yellow card) 4× (suspension)	Report	3× (yellow card) 5× (suspension)	Folksam Arena, Siuntio; Attendance: 1,000; Referees: Brunner, Salah (SUI)

6 November 2016; 20:00	Bosnia and Herzegovina	22–23	Austria	Dvorana Mirza Delibašić, Sarajevo; Attendance: 4,000; Referees: Horáček, Novotný (CZE)
6 November 2016; 20:00	Tarabochia 6	(11–9)	Weber 6	Dvorana Mirza Delibašić, Sarajevo; Attendance: 4,000; Referees: Horáček, Novotný (CZE)
6 November 2016; 20:00	2× (yellow card) 5× (suspension) 1× (red card)	Report	2× (yellow card) 5× (suspension)	Dvorana Mirza Delibašić, Sarajevo; Attendance: 4,000; Referees: Horáček, Novotný (CZE)

3 May 2017; 20:25	Austria	29–30	Spain	OlympiaWorld Innsbruck, Innsbruck; Attendance: 3,000; Referees: Krstič, Ljubič (SLO)
3 May 2017; 20:25	Božović 6	(13–14)	Solé Sala 5	OlympiaWorld Innsbruck, Innsbruck; Attendance: 3,000; Referees: Krstič, Ljubič (SLO)
3 May 2017; 20:25	3× (yellow card) 5× (suspension)	Report	2× (yellow card) 1× (suspension)	OlympiaWorld Innsbruck, Innsbruck; Attendance: 3,000; Referees: Krstič, Ljubič (SLO)

4 May 2017; 18:30	Finland	27–32	Bosnia and Herzegovina	Energia Areena, Vantaa; Attendance: 1,500; Referees: Baumgart, Wild (GER)
4 May 2017; 18:30	Rönnberg 7	(10–15)	Panić 10	Energia Areena, Vantaa; Attendance: 1,500; Referees: Baumgart, Wild (GER)
4 May 2017; 18:30	3× (yellow card) 4× (suspension)	Report	2× (yellow card) 8× (suspension) 1× (red card)	Energia Areena, Vantaa; Attendance: 1,500; Referees: Baumgart, Wild (GER)

6 May 2017; 20:00	Spain	35–24	Austria	Palacio de los Deportes de León, León; Attendance: 2,500; Referees: Gjeding, Hansen (DEN)
6 May 2017; 20:00	Aguinagalde, Rivera Folch 6	(15–11)	Hermann 7	Palacio de los Deportes de León, León; Attendance: 2,500; Referees: Gjeding, Hansen (DEN)
6 May 2017; 20:00	1× (yellow card) 3× (suspension)	Report	3× (yellow card) 3× (suspension)	Palacio de los Deportes de León, León; Attendance: 2,500; Referees: Gjeding, Hansen (DEN)

7 May 2017; 20:00	Bosnia and Herzegovina	34–23	Finland	Sportska Dv."Mirsad Hurić", Goražde; Attendance: 1,560; Referees: Andorka, Hucker (HUN)
7 May 2017; 20:00	Burić, Panić 7	(19–12)	Rönnberg 7	Sportska Dv."Mirsad Hurić", Goražde; Attendance: 1,560; Referees: Andorka, Hucker (HUN)
7 May 2017; 20:00	2× (yellow card) 3× (suspension)	Report	3× (yellow card) 3× (suspension)	Sportska Dv."Mirsad Hurić", Goražde; Attendance: 1,560; Referees: Andorka, Hucker (HUN)

14 June 2017; 18:00	Bosnia and Herzegovina	19–25	Spain	Dvorana Mirza Delibašić, Sarajevo; Attendance: 3,652; Referees: Schulze, Tönnies (GER)
14 June 2017; 18:00	Terzić 5	(11–14)	Fernández Pérez 5	Dvorana Mirza Delibašić, Sarajevo; Attendance: 3,652; Referees: Schulze, Tönnies (GER)
14 June 2017; 18:00	3× (yellow card) 3× (suspension)	Report	3× (yellow card) 3× (suspension)	Dvorana Mirza Delibašić, Sarajevo; Attendance: 3,652; Referees: Schulze, Tönnies (GER)

14 June 2017; 18:30	Finland	36–39	Austria	Energia Areena, Vantaa; Attendance: 600; Referees: Zotin, Volodkov (RUS)
14 June 2017; 18:30	Sundberg 10	(15–21)	Božović, Frimmel 7	Energia Areena, Vantaa; Attendance: 600; Referees: Zotin, Volodkov (RUS)
14 June 2017; 18:30	3× (yellow card) 3× (suspension)	Report	3× (yellow card) 6× (suspension)	Energia Areena, Vantaa; Attendance: 600; Referees: Zotin, Volodkov (RUS)

17 June 2017; 18:00	Spain	46–16	Finland	Pabellón Pitiu Rochel, Alicante; Attendance: 1,800; Referees: Gasmi, Gasmi (FRA)
17 June 2017; 18:00	Figueras 7	(27–9)	B. Broman, Helander 3	Pabellón Pitiu Rochel, Alicante; Attendance: 1,800; Referees: Gasmi, Gasmi (FRA)
17 June 2017; 18:00	3× (yellow card) 1× (suspension)	Report	2× (yellow card) 3× (suspension)	Pabellón Pitiu Rochel, Alicante; Attendance: 1,800; Referees: Gasmi, Gasmi (FRA)

17 June 2017; 20:25	Austria	34–32	Bosnia and Herzegovina	Albert Schultz Eishalle, Vienna; Attendance: 5,000; Referees: Baranowski, Lemanowicz (POL)
17 June 2017; 20:25	Bilyk 8	(17–17)	Panić 7	Albert Schultz Eishalle, Vienna; Attendance: 5,000; Referees: Baranowski, Lemanowicz (POL)
17 June 2017; 20:25	3× (yellow card) 4× (suspension)	Report	3× (yellow card) 8× (suspension) 1× (red card)	Albert Schultz Eishalle, Vienna; Attendance: 5,000; Referees: Baranowski, Lemanowicz (POL)

=== Group 4 ===
Pos	Team	Pld	W	D	L	GF	GA	GD	Pts	Qualification
1	Macedonia	6	3	1	2	174	158	+16	7	Final tournament
2	Czech Republic	6	3	0	3	161	161	0	6 (Note: Czech Republic 51–49 Iceland)	Final tournament
3	Iceland	6	3	0	3	163	163	0	6	Final tournament
4	Ukraine	6	2	1	3	152	168	−16	5	

Source: Eurohandball
Rules for classification: 1) points; 2) head-to-head points; 3) head-to-head goal difference; 4) head-to-head number of goals scored; 5) goal difference.
Notes:

2 November 2016; 18:30	Macedonia	27–21	Ukraine	Boris Trajkovski Sports Center, Skopje; Attendance: 5,500; Referees: Dobrovits, Tájok (HUN)
2 November 2016; 18:30	K. Lazarov 12	(13–10)	Kozakevych, Zhukov 4	Boris Trajkovski Sports Center, Skopje; Attendance: 5,500; Referees: Dobrovits, Tájok (HUN)
2 November 2016; 18:30	2× (yellow card) 5× (suspension)	Report	3× (yellow card) 6× (suspension)	Boris Trajkovski Sports Center, Skopje; Attendance: 5,500; Referees: Dobrovits, Tájok (HUN)

2 November 2016; 19:30	Iceland	25–24	Czech Republic	Laugardalshöll, Reykjavík; Attendance: 2,450; Referees: Santos, Fonseca (POR)
2 November 2016; 19:30	Sigurðsson 6	(12–10)	Hrstka 5	Laugardalshöll, Reykjavík; Attendance: 2,450; Referees: Santos, Fonseca (POR)
2 November 2016; 19:30	2× (yellow card) 4× (suspension)	Report	2× (yellow card) 4× (suspension)	Laugardalshöll, Reykjavík; Attendance: 2,450; Referees: Santos, Fonseca (POR)

5 November 2016; 14:25	Czech Republic	35–28	Macedonia	Městská sportovní hala, Plzeň; Attendance: 1,400; Referees: López, Ramírez (ESP)
5 November 2016; 14:25	Hrstka 10	(18–12)	K. Lazarov 9	Městská sportovní hala, Plzeň; Attendance: 1,400; Referees: López, Ramírez (ESP)
5 November 2016; 14:25	3× (yellow card) 4× (suspension)	Report	2× (yellow card) 4× (suspension)	Městská sportovní hala, Plzeň; Attendance: 1,400; Referees: López, Ramírez (ESP)

5 November 2016; 18:00	Ukraine	27–25	Iceland	Sport Manezh of Sumy State University, Sumy; Attendance: 1,500; Referees: Krstič, Ljubič (SLO)
5 November 2016; 18:00	Sadovyi 5	(13–13)	Pálmarsson 6	Sport Manezh of Sumy State University, Sumy; Attendance: 1,500; Referees: Krstič, Ljubič (SLO)
5 November 2016; 18:00	3× (yellow card) 5× (suspension)	Report	3× (yellow card) 4× (suspension)	Sport Manezh of Sumy State University, Sumy; Attendance: 1,500; Referees: Krstič, Ljubič (SLO)

3 May 2017; 19:00	Ukraine	26–23	Czech Republic	Sport Manezh of Sumy State University, Sumy; Attendance: 1,500; Referees: Pandžić, Mosorinski (SRB)
3 May 2017; 19:00	Kozakevych 7	(14–12)	Hrstka 9	Sport Manezh of Sumy State University, Sumy; Attendance: 1,500; Referees: Pandžić, Mosorinski (SRB)
3 May 2017; 19:00	3× (yellow card) 6× (suspension) 1× (red card)	Report	3× (yellow card) 8× (suspension) 1× (red card)	Sport Manezh of Sumy State University, Sumy; Attendance: 1,500; Referees: Pandžić, Mosorinski (SRB)

4 May 2017; 20:00	Macedonia	30–25	Iceland	Boris Trajkovski Sports Center, Skopje; Attendance: 6,963; Referees: Geipel, Helbig (GER)
4 May 2017; 20:00	K. Lazarov 11	(15–13)	Sigurðsson 6	Boris Trajkovski Sports Center, Skopje; Attendance: 6,963; Referees: Geipel, Helbig (GER)
4 May 2017; 20:00	3× (yellow card) 3× (suspension)	Report	3× (yellow card) 4× (suspension)	Boris Trajkovski Sports Center, Skopje; Attendance: 6,963; Referees: Geipel, Helbig (GER)

6 May 2017; 14:00	Czech Republic	32–25	Ukraine	Sportovní hala Euronics, Zlín; Attendance: 2,000; Referees: Johansson, Kliko (SWE)
6 May 2017; 14:00	Hrstka 7	(14–13)	Sadovyi 5	Sportovní hala Euronics, Zlín; Attendance: 2,000; Referees: Johansson, Kliko (SWE)
6 May 2017; 14:00	3× (yellow card) 5× (suspension)	Report	3× (yellow card) 7× (suspension) 1× (red card)	Sportovní hala Euronics, Zlín; Attendance: 2,000; Referees: Johansson, Kliko (SWE)

7 May 2017; 19:45	Iceland	30–29	Macedonia	Laugardalshöll, Reykjavík; Attendance: 1,750; Referees: Sondors, Līcis (LAT)
7 May 2017; 19:45	Guðmundsson 7	(16–16)	K. Lazarov 8	Laugardalshöll, Reykjavík; Attendance: 1,750; Referees: Sondors, Līcis (LAT)
7 May 2017; 19:45	3× (yellow card) 4× (suspension)	Report	2× (yellow card) 5× (suspension)	Laugardalshöll, Reykjavík; Attendance: 1,750; Referees: Sondors, Līcis (LAT)

14 June 2017; 18:10	Czech Republic	27–24	Iceland	Sportovní hala Vodova, Brno; Attendance: 2,200; Referees: Mažeika, Gatelis (LTU)
14 June 2017; 18:10	Babák 8	(14–9)	Sigurðsson 9	Sportovní hala Vodova, Brno; Attendance: 2,200; Referees: Mažeika, Gatelis (LTU)
14 June 2017; 18:10	2× (yellow card) 4× (suspension)	Report	3× (yellow card) 1× (suspension)	Sportovní hala Vodova, Brno; Attendance: 2,200; Referees: Mažeika, Gatelis (LTU)

15 June 2017; 19:00	Ukraine	27–27	Macedonia	Sport Manezh of Sumy State University, Sumy; Attendance: 1,200; Referees: Brunovský, Čanda (SVK)
15 June 2017; 19:00	Sadovyi 7	(14–18)	K. Lazarov 8	Sport Manezh of Sumy State University, Sumy; Attendance: 1,200; Referees: Brunovský, Čanda (SVK)
15 June 2017; 19:00	2× (yellow card) 4× (suspension)	Report	3× (yellow card) 1× (suspension)	Sport Manezh of Sumy State University, Sumy; Attendance: 1,200; Referees: Brunovský, Čanda (SVK)

18 June 2017; 18:45	Iceland	34–26	Ukraine	Laugardalshöll, Reykjavík; Attendance: 2,500; Referees: Nikolić, Stojković (SRB)
18 June 2017; 18:45	Sigurðsson 8	(18–13)	Zhukov 7	Laugardalshöll, Reykjavík; Attendance: 2,500; Referees: Nikolić, Stojković (SRB)
18 June 2017; 18:45	3× (yellow card) 5× (suspension)	Report	2× (yellow card) 5× (suspension)	Laugardalshöll, Reykjavík; Attendance: 2,500; Referees: Nikolić, Stojković (SRB)

18 June 2017; 20:45	Macedonia	33–20	Czech Republic	Boris Trajkovski Sports Center, Skopje; Attendance: 7,000; Referees: Dentz, Reibel (FRA)
18 June 2017; 20:45	K. Lazarov 11	(16–10)	four players 3	Boris Trajkovski Sports Center, Skopje; Attendance: 7,000; Referees: Dentz, Reibel (FRA)
18 June 2017; 20:45	3× (yellow card) 2× (suspension)	Report	3× (yellow card) 6× (suspension)	Boris Trajkovski Sports Center, Skopje; Attendance: 7,000; Referees: Dentz, Reibel (FRA)

=== Group 5 ===
Pos	Team	Pld	W	D	L	GF	GA	GD	Pts	Qualification
1	Germany	6	6	0	0	173	137	+36	12	Final tournament
2	Slovenia	6	3	1	2	162	148	+14	7	Final tournament
3	Portugal	6	2	1	3	148	165	−17	5	
4	Switzerland	6	0	0	6	138	171	−33	0	

Source: Eurohandball
Rules for classification: 1) points; 2) head-to-head points; 3) head-to-head goal difference; 4) head-to-head number of goals scored; 5) goal difference.

2 November 2016; 18:00	Slovenia	32–27	Switzerland	Red Hall, Velenje; Attendance: 1,700; Referees: Gjeding, Hansen (DEN)
2 November 2016; 18:00	Janc 5	(12–15)	Liniger 6	Red Hall, Velenje; Attendance: 1,700; Referees: Gjeding, Hansen (DEN)
2 November 2016; 18:00	2× (yellow card) 7× (suspension) 1× (red card)	Report	2× (yellow card) 7× (suspension)	Red Hall, Velenje; Attendance: 1,700; Referees: Gjeding, Hansen (DEN)

2 November 2016; 18:30	Germany	35–24	Portugal	Rittal Arena Wetzlar, Wetzlar; Attendance: 4,421; Referees: Mažeika, Gatelis (LIT)
2 November 2016; 18:30	Musche 6	(16–10)	Amador 5	Rittal Arena Wetzlar, Wetzlar; Attendance: 4,421; Referees: Mažeika, Gatelis (LIT)
2 November 2016; 18:30	2× (yellow card) 6× (suspension)	Report	3× (yellow card) 4× (suspension)	Rittal Arena Wetzlar, Wetzlar; Attendance: 4,421; Referees: Mažeika, Gatelis (LIT)

5 November 2016; 17:45	Switzerland	22–23	Germany	Hallenstadion, Zürich; Attendance: 10,040; Referees: Dinu, Din (ROU)
5 November 2016; 17:45	Schmid 5	(11–12)	Weinhold 4	Hallenstadion, Zürich; Attendance: 10,040; Referees: Dinu, Din (ROU)
5 November 2016; 17:45	3× (yellow card) 4× (suspension)	Report	3× (yellow card) 4× (suspension)	Hallenstadion, Zürich; Attendance: 10,040; Referees: Dinu, Din (ROU)

6 November 2016; 15:00	Portugal	26–26	Slovenia	Pavilhão EDP, Lisbon; Attendance: 1,582; Referees: Sondors, Līcis (LAT)
6 November 2016; 15:00	Duarte 5	(9–12)	Blagotinšek 6	Pavilhão EDP, Lisbon; Attendance: 1,582; Referees: Sondors, Līcis (LAT)
6 November 2016; 15:00	3× (yellow card) 3× (suspension) 1× (red card)	Report	3× (yellow card) 5× (suspension)	Pavilhão EDP, Lisbon; Attendance: 1,582; Referees: Sondors, Līcis (LAT)

3 May 2017; 20:00	Slovenia	23–32	Germany	Arena Stožice, Ljubljana; Attendance: 10,000; Referees: Pichon, Reveret (FRA)
3 May 2017; 20:00	Dolenec 5	(12–19)	Gensheimer 11	Arena Stožice, Ljubljana; Attendance: 10,000; Referees: Pichon, Reveret (FRA)
3 May 2017; 20:00	3× (yellow card) 3× (suspension)	Report	2× (yellow card) 5× (suspension)	Arena Stožice, Ljubljana; Attendance: 10,000; Referees: Pichon, Reveret (FRA)

4 May 2017; 19:00	Switzerland	25–27	Portugal	Tissot Arena, Biel; Attendance: 3,275; Referees: Kurtagic, Wetterwik (SWE)
4 May 2017; 19:00	Rubin 7	(11–13)	Duarte 6	Tissot Arena, Biel; Attendance: 3,275; Referees: Kurtagic, Wetterwik (SWE)
4 May 2017; 19:00	3× (yellow card) 4× (suspension)	Report	3× (yellow card) 5× (suspension) 1× (red card)	Tissot Arena, Biel; Attendance: 3,275; Referees: Kurtagic, Wetterwik (SWE)

6 May 2017; 16:10	Germany	25–20	Slovenia	Gerry Weber Stadion, Halle; Attendance: 9,300; Referees: Dobrovits, Tájok (HUN)
6 May 2017; 16:10	three players 4	(14–10)	Henigman 5	Gerry Weber Stadion, Halle; Attendance: 9,300; Referees: Dobrovits, Tájok (HUN)
6 May 2017; 16:10	1× (yellow card) 5× (suspension)	Report	3× (yellow card) 5× (suspension)	Gerry Weber Stadion, Halle; Attendance: 9,300; Referees: Dobrovits, Tájok (HUN)

7 May 2017; 15:00	Portugal	27–22	Switzerland	Pavilhão Desportivo Municipal de Loulé, Loulé; Attendance: 1,732; Referees: Opava, Valek (CZE)
7 May 2017; 15:00	Magalhães 5	(17–10)	Schmid 5	Pavilhão Desportivo Municipal de Loulé, Loulé; Attendance: 1,732; Referees: Opava, Valek (CZE)
7 May 2017; 15:00	3× (yellow card) 1× (suspension)	Report	2× (yellow card) 2× (suspension)	Pavilhão Desportivo Municipal de Loulé, Loulé; Attendance: 1,732; Referees: Opava, Valek (CZE)

14 June 2017; 19:30	Portugal	26–29	Germany	Multiusos Gondomar, Gondomar; Attendance: 3,000; Referees: Nikolov, Nachevski (MKD)
14 June 2017; 19:30	four players 4	(16–15)	Gensheimer, Kühn 6	Multiusos Gondomar, Gondomar; Attendance: 3,000; Referees: Nikolov, Nachevski (MKD)
14 June 2017; 19:30	3× (yellow card) 1× (suspension) 1× (red card)	Report	3× (yellow card) 3× (suspension)	Multiusos Gondomar, Gondomar; Attendance: 3,000; Referees: Nikolov, Nachevski (MKD)

14 June 2017; 20:15	Switzerland	20–33	Slovenia	BBC-Arena, Schaffhausen; Attendance: 1,245; Referees: Álvarez, Bustamante (SPA)
14 June 2017; 20:15	Maros 6	(9–18)	Blagotinšek, Dolenec 5	BBC-Arena, Schaffhausen; Attendance: 1,245; Referees: Álvarez, Bustamante (SPA)
14 June 2017; 20:15	2× (yellow card) 3× (suspension)	Report	3× (yellow card) 2× (suspension)	BBC-Arena, Schaffhausen; Attendance: 1,245; Referees: Álvarez, Bustamante (SPA)

17 June 2017; 20:00	Slovenia	28–18	Portugal	Arena Bonifika, Koper; Attendance: 3,500; Referees: Elíasson, Pálsson (ISL)
17 June 2017; 20:00	three players 4	(12–9)	Magalhaes 4	Arena Bonifika, Koper; Attendance: 3,500; Referees: Elíasson, Pálsson (ISL)
17 June 2017; 20:00	3× (yellow card) 6× (suspension)	Report	3× (yellow card) 5× (suspension)	Arena Bonifika, Koper; Attendance: 3,500; Referees: Elíasson, Pálsson (ISL)

18 June 2017; 15:00	Germany	29–22	Switzerland	ÖVB Arena, Bremen; Attendance: 8,900; Referees: Pandžić, Mosorinski (SER)
18 June 2017; 15:00	Schiller 7	(12–13)	Schmid 10	ÖVB Arena, Bremen; Attendance: 8,900; Referees: Pandžić, Mosorinski (SER)
18 June 2017; 15:00	3× (yellow card) 3× (suspension)	Report	3× (yellow card) 3× (suspension)	ÖVB Arena, Bremen; Attendance: 8,900; Referees: Pandžić, Mosorinski (SER)

=== Group 6 ===
Pos	Team	Pld	W	D	L	GF	GA	GD	Pts	Qualification
1	Sweden	6	5	0	1	166	125	+41	10	Final tournament
2	Montenegro	6	2	3	1	158	168	−10	7	Final tournament
3	Russia	6	1	3	2	149	160	−11	5	
4	Slovakia	6	0	2	4	146	166	−20	2	

Source: Eurohandball
Rules for classification: 1) points; 2) head-to-head points; 3) head-to-head goal difference; 4) head-to-head number of goals scored; 5) goal difference.

2 November 2016; 19:30	Russia	31–31	Slovakia	Krylatskoye Sports Palace, Moscow; Attendance: 1,665; Referees: Gubica, Milošević (CRO)
2 November 2016; 19:30	Shelmenko 6	(13–13)	Antl 10	Krylatskoye Sports Palace, Moscow; Attendance: 1,665; Referees: Gubica, Milošević (CRO)
2 November 2016; 19:30	3× (yellow card) 5× (suspension) 1× (red card)	Report	3× (yellow card) 5× (suspension)	Krylatskoye Sports Palace, Moscow; Attendance: 1,665; Referees: Gubica, Milošević (CRO)

3 November 2016; 19:15	Sweden	36–21	Montenegro	FFS Arena, Lund; Attendance: 3,016; Referees: Baumgart, Wild (GER)
3 November 2016; 19:15	Gottfridsson 6	(14–9)	Borozan, Čavor 5	FFS Arena, Lund; Attendance: 3,016; Referees: Baumgart, Wild (GER)
3 November 2016; 19:15	3× (yellow card) 4× (suspension)	Report	3× (yellow card) 4× (suspension)	FFS Arena, Lund; Attendance: 3,016; Referees: Baumgart, Wild (GER)

5 November 2016; 18:00	Slovakia	17–21	Sweden	Steel Aréna, Košice; Attendance: 7,143; Referees: Lah, Sok (SLO)
5 November 2016; 18:00	Antl 6	(8–15)	Ekberg, Gottfridsson 5	Steel Aréna, Košice; Attendance: 7,143; Referees: Lah, Sok (SLO)
5 November 2016; 18:00	2× (yellow card) 3× (suspension)	Report	3× (yellow card) 6× (suspension)	Steel Aréna, Košice; Attendance: 7,143; Referees: Lah, Sok (SLO)

6 November 2016; 18:00	Montenegro	24–24	Russia	SC Topolica, Bar; Attendance: 2,150; Referees: Horváth, Marton (HUN)
6 November 2016; 18:00	Borozan 10	(12–11)	Atman 8	SC Topolica, Bar; Attendance: 2,150; Referees: Horváth, Marton (HUN)
6 November 2016; 18:00	3× (yellow card) 3× (suspension)	Report	5× (yellow card) 2× (suspension)	SC Topolica, Bar; Attendance: 2,150; Referees: Horváth, Marton (HUN)

3 May 2017; 18:30	Slovakia	27–27	Montenegro	Športová hala Na Zábraní, Hlohovec; Attendance: 1,950; Referees: Elíasson, Pálsson (ISL)
3 May 2017; 18:30	Urban 9	(15–11)	Borozan 11	Športová hala Na Zábraní, Hlohovec; Attendance: 1,950; Referees: Elíasson, Pálsson (ISL)
3 May 2017; 18:30	3× (yellow card) 7× (suspension)	Report	3× (yellow card) 9× (suspension) 2× (red card)	Športová hala Na Zábraní, Hlohovec; Attendance: 1,950; Referees: Elíasson, Pálsson (ISL)

3 May 2017; 19:15	Russia	21–29	Sweden	Sibur Arena, Saint Petersburg; Attendance: 0 Referees: Caçador, Nicolau (POR)
3 May 2017; 19:15	Dereven 5	(10–17)	Ekberg 9	Sibur Arena, Saint Petersburg; Attendance: 0 Referees: Caçador, Nicolau (POR)
3 May 2017; 19:15	3× (yellow card) 3× (suspension)	Report	3× (yellow card) 1× (suspension)	Sibur Arena, Saint Petersburg; Attendance: 0 Referees: Caçador, Nicolau (POR)

6 May 2017; 17:15	Sweden	25–21	Russia	Saab Arena, Linköping; Attendance: 5,511; Referees: Marín, García (ESP)
6 May 2017; 17:15	Zachrisson 7	(10–11)	Soroka 6	Saab Arena, Linköping; Attendance: 5,511; Referees: Marín, García (ESP)
6 May 2017; 17:15	2× (yellow card) 3× (suspension)	Report	2× (yellow card) 1× (suspension)	Saab Arena, Linköping; Attendance: 5,511; Referees: Marín, García (ESP)

6 May 2017; 20:00	Montenegro	31–30	Slovakia	Sporthall "Nikoljac", Bijelo Polje; Attendance: 2,260; Referees: Dentz, Reibel (FRA)
6 May 2017; 20:00	Grbović 8	(16–14)	four players 4	Sporthall "Nikoljac", Bijelo Polje; Attendance: 2,260; Referees: Dentz, Reibel (FRA)
6 May 2017; 20:00	3× (yellow card) 7× (suspension)	Report	3× (yellow card) 4× (suspension)	Sporthall "Nikoljac", Bijelo Polje; Attendance: 2,260; Referees: Dentz, Reibel (FRA)

14 June 2017; 20:00	Montenegro	28–24	Sweden	Sportski Centar Nikšić, Nikšić; Attendance: 3,600; Referees: Horáček, Novotný (CZE)
14 June 2017; 20:00	Borozan 10	(16–7)	Lagergren 5	Sportski Centar Nikšić, Nikšić; Attendance: 3,600; Referees: Horáček, Novotný (CZE)
14 June 2017; 20:00	2× (yellow card) 4× (suspension)	Report	2× (suspension)	Sportski Centar Nikšić, Nikšić; Attendance: 3,600; Referees: Horáček, Novotný (CZE)

14 June 2017; 20:00	Slovakia	24–25	Russia	Ondrej Nepela Arena, Bratislava; Attendance: 6,965; Referees: Dinu, Din (ROU)
14 June 2017; 20:00	T. Urban 9	(12–12)	Shishkaryov 6	Ondrej Nepela Arena, Bratislava; Attendance: 6,965; Referees: Dinu, Din (ROU)
14 June 2017; 20:00	2× (yellow card) 6× (suspension)	Report	3× (yellow card) 4× (suspension)	Ondrej Nepela Arena, Bratislava; Attendance: 6,965; Referees: Dinu, Din (ROU)

17 June 2017; 15:00	Russia	27–27	Montenegro	Alexander Gomelsky Universal Sports Hall CSKA, Moscow; Attendance: 2,000; Referees: Madsen, Mortensen (DEN)
17 June 2017; 15:00	Kiselev, Kovalyov 6	(16–11)	Borozan 7	Alexander Gomelsky Universal Sports Hall CSKA, Moscow; Attendance: 2,000; Referees: Madsen, Mortensen (DEN)
17 June 2017; 15:00	2× (yellow card) 3× (suspension)	Report	2× (yellow card) 6× (suspension)	Alexander Gomelsky Universal Sports Hall CSKA, Moscow; Attendance: 2,000; Referees: Madsen, Mortensen (DEN)

17 June 2017; 17:15	Sweden	31–17	Slovakia	Sparbanken Lidköping Arena, Lidköping; Attendance: 2,039; Referees: Covalciuc, Covalciuc (MDA)
17 June 2017; 17:15	Ekberg, Tollbring 5	(14–7)	Hruščák 4	Sparbanken Lidköping Arena, Lidköping; Attendance: 2,039; Referees: Covalciuc, Covalciuc (MDA)
17 June 2017; 17:15	3× (yellow card) 2× (suspension)	Report	3× (yellow card) 1× (suspension)	Sparbanken Lidköping Arena, Lidköping; Attendance: 2,039; Referees: Covalciuc, Covalciuc (MDA)

=== Group 7 ===
Pos	Team	Pld	W	D	L	GF	GA	GD	Pts	Qualification
1	France	6	5	0	1	191	169	+22	10	Final tournament
2	Norway	6	4	0	2	196	163	+33	8	Final tournament
3	Lithuania	6	3	0	3	163	179	−16	6	
4	Belgium	6	0	0	6	175	214	−39	0	

Source: Eurohandball
Rules for classification: 1) points; 2) head-to-head points; 3) head-to-head goal difference; 4) head-to-head number of goals scored; 5) goal difference.

2 November 2016; 19:00	Norway	35–26	Belgium	Bodø Spektrum, Bodø; Attendance: 2,252; Referees: Brkic, Jusufhodzic (AUT)
2 November 2016; 19:00	Lie Hansen 7	(20–14)	D. Kedziora 6	Bodø Spektrum, Bodø; Attendance: 2,252; Referees: Brkic, Jusufhodzic (AUT)
2 November 2016; 19:00	3× (yellow card) 3× (suspension)	Report	3× (yellow card) 3× (suspension)	Bodø Spektrum, Bodø; Attendance: 2,252; Referees: Brkic, Jusufhodzic (AUT)

3 November 2016; 19:00	France	37–20	Lithuania	Palais des Sports de Pau, Pau; Attendance: 6,500; Referees: Mitrevski, Todorovski (MKD)
3 November 2016; 19:00	Mahé 7	(21–7)	Plėta 4	Palais des Sports de Pau, Pau; Attendance: 6,500; Referees: Mitrevski, Todorovski (MKD)
3 November 2016; 19:00	3× (yellow card) 1× (suspension)	Report	3× (yellow card) 3× (suspension)	Palais des Sports de Pau, Pau; Attendance: 6,500; Referees: Mitrevski, Todorovski (MKD)

6 November 2016; 15:30	Belgium	37–38	France	Country Hall Liège, Liège; Attendance: 4,200; Referees: Sigurjónsson, Pétursson (ISL)
6 November 2016; 15:30	D. Kedziora 8	(19–16)	Mahé 11	Country Hall Liège, Liège; Attendance: 4,200; Referees: Sigurjónsson, Pétursson (ISL)
6 November 2016; 15:30	3× (yellow card) 5× (suspension) 1× (red card)	Report	3× (yellow card) 3× (suspension)	Country Hall Liège, Liège; Attendance: 4,200; Referees: Sigurjónsson, Pétursson (ISL)

6 November 2016; 18:00	Lithuania	32–29	Norway	Siemens Arena, Vilnius; Attendance: 2,100; Referees: Nikolić, Stojković (SER)
6 November 2016; 18:00	Bernatonis 8	(15–16)	Bjørnsen 9	Siemens Arena, Vilnius; Attendance: 2,100; Referees: Nikolić, Stojković (SER)
6 November 2016; 18:00	2× (yellow card) 4× (suspension)	Report	3× (yellow card) 2× (suspension)	Siemens Arena, Vilnius; Attendance: 2,100; Referees: Nikolić, Stojković (SER)

3 May 2017; 18:30	Norway	35–30	France	Oslo Spektrum, Oslo; Attendance: 6,900; Referees: Nikolov, Nachevski (MKD)
3 May 2017; 18:30	Sagosen 13	(12–11)	Remili 7	Oslo Spektrum, Oslo; Attendance: 6,900; Referees: Nikolov, Nachevski (MKD)
3 May 2017; 18:30	3× (yellow card) 2× (suspension)	Report	3× (yellow card) 3× (suspension)	Oslo Spektrum, Oslo; Attendance: 6,900; Referees: Nikolov, Nachevski (MKD)

3 May 2017; 20:30	Belgium	29–33	Lithuania	Sportoase Philipssite, Leuven; Attendance: 1,700; Referees: Covalciuc, Covalciuc (MDA)
3 May 2017; 20:30	D. Kedziora 11	(18–15)	Malašinskas 13	Sportoase Philipssite, Leuven; Attendance: 1,700; Referees: Covalciuc, Covalciuc (MDA)
3 May 2017; 20:30	3× (yellow card) 5× (suspension)	Report	3× (yellow card) 5× (suspension)	Sportoase Philipssite, Leuven; Attendance: 1,700; Referees: Covalciuc, Covalciuc (MDA)

6 May 2017; 18:00	France	28–24	Norway	Clermont-Ferrand Sports Hall, Clermont-Ferrand; Attendance: 4,800; Referees: Lopéz, Ramírez (SPA)
6 May 2017; 18:00	Narcisse 8	(13–10)	Jøndal, Sagosen 5	Clermont-Ferrand Sports Hall, Clermont-Ferrand; Attendance: 4,800; Referees: Lopéz, Ramírez (SPA)
6 May 2017; 18:00	3× (yellow card) 6× (suspension)	Report	3× (yellow card) 4× (suspension)	Clermont-Ferrand Sports Hall, Clermont-Ferrand; Attendance: 4,800; Referees: Lopéz, Ramírez (SPA)

7 May 2017; 18:00	Lithuania	33–28	Belgium	Siemens Arena, Vilnius; Attendance: 2,300; Referees: Olesen, Pedersen (DEN)
7 May 2017; 18:00	Truchanovicius 6	(18–11)	D. Kedziora 5	Siemens Arena, Vilnius; Attendance: 2,300; Referees: Olesen, Pedersen (DEN)
7 May 2017; 18:00	2× (yellow card) 5× (suspension)	Report	3× (yellow card) 5× (suspension)	Siemens Arena, Vilnius; Attendance: 2,300; Referees: Olesen, Pedersen (DEN)

14 June 2017; 19:00	Lithuania	25–26	France	Švyturys Arena, Klaipėda; Attendance: 2,546; Referees: Kékes, Kékes (HUN)
14 June 2017; 19:00	Truchanovicius 6	(12–12)	Mahé 6	Švyturys Arena, Klaipėda; Attendance: 2,546; Referees: Kékes, Kékes (HUN)
14 June 2017; 19:00	3× (yellow card) 2× (suspension)	Report	3× (yellow card) 3× (suspension)	Švyturys Arena, Klaipėda; Attendance: 2,546; Referees: Kékes, Kékes (HUN)

14 June 2017; 20:30	Belgium	27–43	Norway	Sportoase Philipssite, Leuven; Attendance: 1,170; Referees: Krstič, Ljubič (SLO)
14 June 2017; 20:30	Robyns 6	(15–20)	Myrhol 7	Sportoase Philipssite, Leuven; Attendance: 1,170; Referees: Krstič, Ljubič (SLO)
14 June 2017; 20:30	2× (yellow card) 4× (suspension)	Report	1× (yellow card) 3× (suspension)	Sportoase Philipssite, Leuven; Attendance: 1,170; Referees: Krstič, Ljubič (SLO)

17 June 2017; 19:30	Norway	30–20	Lithuania	Oslo Spektrum, Oslo; Attendance: 6,507; Referees: Gubica, Milošević (CRO)
17 June 2017; 19:30	Myrhol, Sagosen 5	(15–10)	Malašinskas, Truchanovicius 5	Oslo Spektrum, Oslo; Attendance: 6,507; Referees: Gubica, Milošević (CRO)
17 June 2017; 19:30	3× (yellow card) 1× (suspension)	Report	3× (yellow card) 4× (suspension)	Oslo Spektrum, Oslo; Attendance: 6,507; Referees: Gubica, Milošević (CRO)

17 June 2017; 19:45	France	32–28	Belgium	Axone, Montbéliard; Attendance: 4,800; Referees: Kurtagic, Wetterwik (SWE)
17 June 2017; 19:45	Accambray 8	(18–14)	three players 6	Axone, Montbéliard; Attendance: 4,800; Referees: Kurtagic, Wetterwik (SWE)
17 June 2017; 19:45	3× (yellow card) 1× (suspension)	Report	2× (yellow card) 2× (suspension)	Axone, Montbéliard; Attendance: 4,800; Referees: Kurtagic, Wetterwik (SWE)

=== Ranking of third-placed teams ===
The highest ranked third-placed team from the groups directly qualifies for the tournament. Matches against the fourth placed teams in each group are discarded.

Pos	Grp	Team	Pld	W	D	L	GF	GA	GD	Pts	Qualification
1	4	Iceland	4	2	0	2	104	110	−6	4	Final tournament
2	6	Russia	4	0	2	2	93	105	−12	2	
3	2	Romania	4	1	0	3	92	105	−13	2	
4	7	Lithuania	4	1	0	3	97	127	−30	2	
5	5	Portugal	4	0	1	3	94	118	−24	1	
6	3	Bosnia and Herzegovina	4	0	0	4	94	112	−18	0	
7	1	Netherlands	4	0	0	4	101	128	−27	0	

Source: Eurohandball
