= Raitis =

Male given name

- Gender: Male
- Name day: 14 January

Origin
- Region of origin: Latvia

Raitis is a Latvian masculine given name and may refer to:

- Raitis Grafs (born 1981), Latvian basketball player
- Raitis Ivanāns (born 1979), Latvian ice hockey player
- Raitis Puriņš (born 1988), Latvian handball player
