= Ingars Dude =

Latvian handball player (born 1987)

Personal information
- Nationality: Latvian
- Born: 1 January 1987 (age 39)
- Height: 1.95 m (6 ft 5 in)

Sport
- Sport: Handball
- Position: Pivot
- Current club: Limoges Hand 87
- Number: 27
National team
Years	Team	Apps	(Gls)
–	Latvia	73	(152)

Ingars Dude (born 1 January 1987) is a Latvian handball player for Limoges Hand 87 and the Latvian national team.

He represented Latvia at the 2020 European Men's Handball Championship. This was Latvias first ever appearance at a major international tournament. They finished 24th out of 24 teams.
