= Ģirts Lilienfelds =

Latvian handball player (born 1982)

Personal information
- Nationality: Latvian
- Born: 4 December 1982 (age 43) Dobele, Latvia
- Height: 1.89 m (6 ft 2 in)

Sport
- Sport: Handball
- Position: Right back
- Current club: HSC 2000 Coburg
- Number: 33
National team
Years	Team	Apps	(Gls)
–	Latvia	84	(215)

Ģirts Lilienfelds (born 4 December 1982) is a Latvian handball player for HSC 2000 Coburg and the Latvian national team.

He represented Latvia at the 2020 European Men's Handball Championship. This was Latvias first ever appearance at a major international tournament. They finished 24th out of 24 teams.
