= Armands Uščins =

Latvian handball player and coach

Personal information
- Born: 6 October 1973 (age 53) Riga, Latvia

Sport
- Sport: Handball

Senior clubs
- Years: Team
- -2005: ASK Rīga
- 2005-??: HC Hard
- –: Dessau-Roßlauer HV

Teams managed
- 2017–2020: Latvia

Armands Uščins (6 October 1973) is a Latvian handball coach of the Latvian national team and former player. He coached the Latvian team at the 2020 European Men's Handball Championship. This was Latvias first ever appearance at a major international tournament. They finished 24th out of 24 teams.

Uščins' son Renārs plays for the Germany national team.
