= Rihards Leja =

Latvian handball player (born 1992)

Personal information
- Nationality: Latvian
- Born: 28 July 1992 (age 34) Dobele, Latvia
- Height: 1.87 m (6 ft 2 in)

Sport
- Sport: Handball
- Position: Left wing
- Current club: Celtnieks Rīga
- Number: 7
National team
| Years | Team | Apps | (Gls) |
| – | Latvia | 27 | (30) |

Rihards Leja (born 28 July 1992) is a Latvian handball player for Ogre, and the Latvian national team.

He represented Latvia at the 2020 European Men's Handball Championship. This was Latvias first ever appearance at a major international tournament. They finished 24th out of 24 teams.
