= Edgars Kukša =

Latvian handball player (born 1990)

Personal information
- Nationality: Latvian
- Born: 26 January 1990 (age 36)
- Height: 1.91 m (6 ft 3 in)

Sport
- Sport: Handball
- Position: Goalkeeper
- Current club: OHV Aurich
- Number: 12
National team
Years	Team	Apps	(Gls)
–	Latvia	80	(0)

Edgars Kukša (born 26 January 1990) is a Latvian handball player for OHV Aurich and the Latvian national team.

He represented Latvia at the 2020 European Men's Handball Championship. This was Latvias first ever appearance at a major international tournament. They finished 24th out of 24 teams.
