= Austris Tuminskis =

Latvian handball player (born 1990)

Personal information
- Nationality: Latvian
- Born: 7 June 1990 (age 36)
- Height: 1.98 m (6 ft 6 in)

Sport
- Sport: Handball
- Position: Centre back
- Current club: EHV Aue
National team
Years	Team	Apps	(Gls)
–	Latvia	58	(119)

Austris Tuminskis (born 7 June 1990) is a Latvian handball player for EHV Aue and the Latvian national team.

He also played in SK Latgols. He trained at the Ludza city gymnasium. His first trainer was Andrejs Grebežs. He played in the National team U-18 and U-20. He was Latvia's best player in 2009. He averaged 5 goals per game.

He represented Latvia at the 2020 European Men's Handball Championship. This was Latvias first ever appearance at a major international tournament. They finished 24th out of 24 teams.
