= Uvis Stazdiņš =

Latvian handball player (born 1999)

Personal information
- Nationality: Latvian
- Born: 5 October 1999 (age 27)
- Height: 1.80 m (5 ft 11 in)

Sport
- Sport: Handball
- Position: Right wing
- Current club: HC Kehra
- Number: 6
National team
Years	Team	Apps	(Gls)
–	Latvia	16	(22)

Uvis Stazdiņš (born 5 October 1999) is a Latvian handball player for HC Kehra and the Latvian national team.

He represented Latvia at the 2020 European Men's Handball Championship. This was Latvias first ever appearance at a major international tournament. They finished 24th out of 24 teams.
