= Evars Klešniks =

Latvian handball player (born 1980)

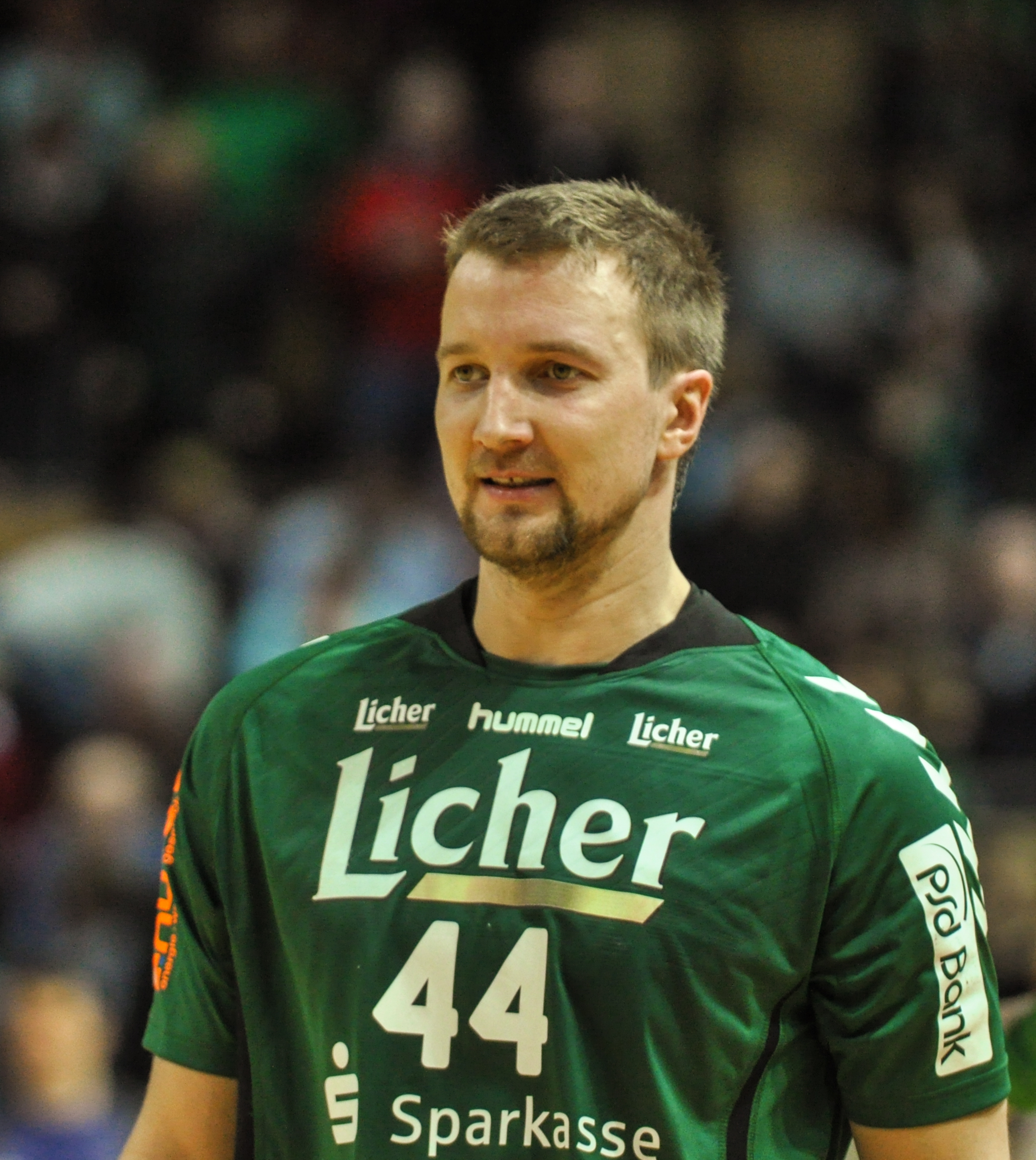

Personal information
- Nationality: Latvian
- Born: 18 May 1980 (age 46) Aizkraukle, Latvia
- Height: 1.99 m (6 ft 6 in)

Sport
- Sport: Handball
- Position: Right back
- Current club: LiT Tribe Germania
- Number: 44
National team
Years	Team	Apps	(Gls)
–	Latvia	73	(214)

Evars Klešniks (born 18 May 1980) is a Latvian handball player for LiT Tribe Germania and the Latvian national team.

He represented Latvia at the 2020 European Men's Handball Championship. This was Latvias first ever appearance at a major international tournament. They finished 24th out of 24 teams.
