= Raitis Puriņš =

Latvian handball player (born 1988)

Personal information
- Nationality: Latvian
- Born: 20 May 1988 (age 38) Riga, Latvia
- Height: 1.90 m (6 ft 3 in)

Sport
- Sport: Handball
- Position: Goalkeeper
- Current club: Celtnieks Rīga
- Number: 16
National team
Years	Team	Apps	(Gls)
–	Latvia	41	(0)

Raitis Puriņš (born 20 May 1988) is a Latvian handball player for Celtnieks Rīga and the Latvian national team.

He represented Latvia at the 2020 European Men's Handball Championship. This was Latvias first ever appearance at a major international tournament. They finished 24th out of 24 teams.
