= Revaz Chanturia =

Georgian handball player

Personal information
- Nationality: Georgian
- Born: 31 May 1982 (age 44) Tbilisi, Georgia
- Height: 1.79 m (5 ft 10 in)

Sport
- Sport: Handball
- Position: Right wing
- Current club: ZHC Grupenlampe
- Number: 23

Senior clubs
- Years: Team
- 1999–2004: GTU Shevardeni
- 2004–2010: RK Metalurg Skopje
- 2010–2011: RK Vardar PRO
- 2011–2012: RK Pelister
- 2012–2016: RK Maks Strumica
- 2016–2019: RK Pelister
- 2019: RK Struga
- 2019–2020: RK Metalurg Skopje
- 2020–2023: RK Prilep 2010
- 2023–: ZHC Grupenlampe
National team
- Years: Team
- –: Georgia

Teams managed
- 2022–2023: RK Prilep 2010

Revaz Chanturia (born 31 May 1982) is a Georgian handball player who plays for ZHC Grupenlampe and the Georgia men's national handball team.
