= Valentin Ghionea =

Romanian handball player (born 1984)

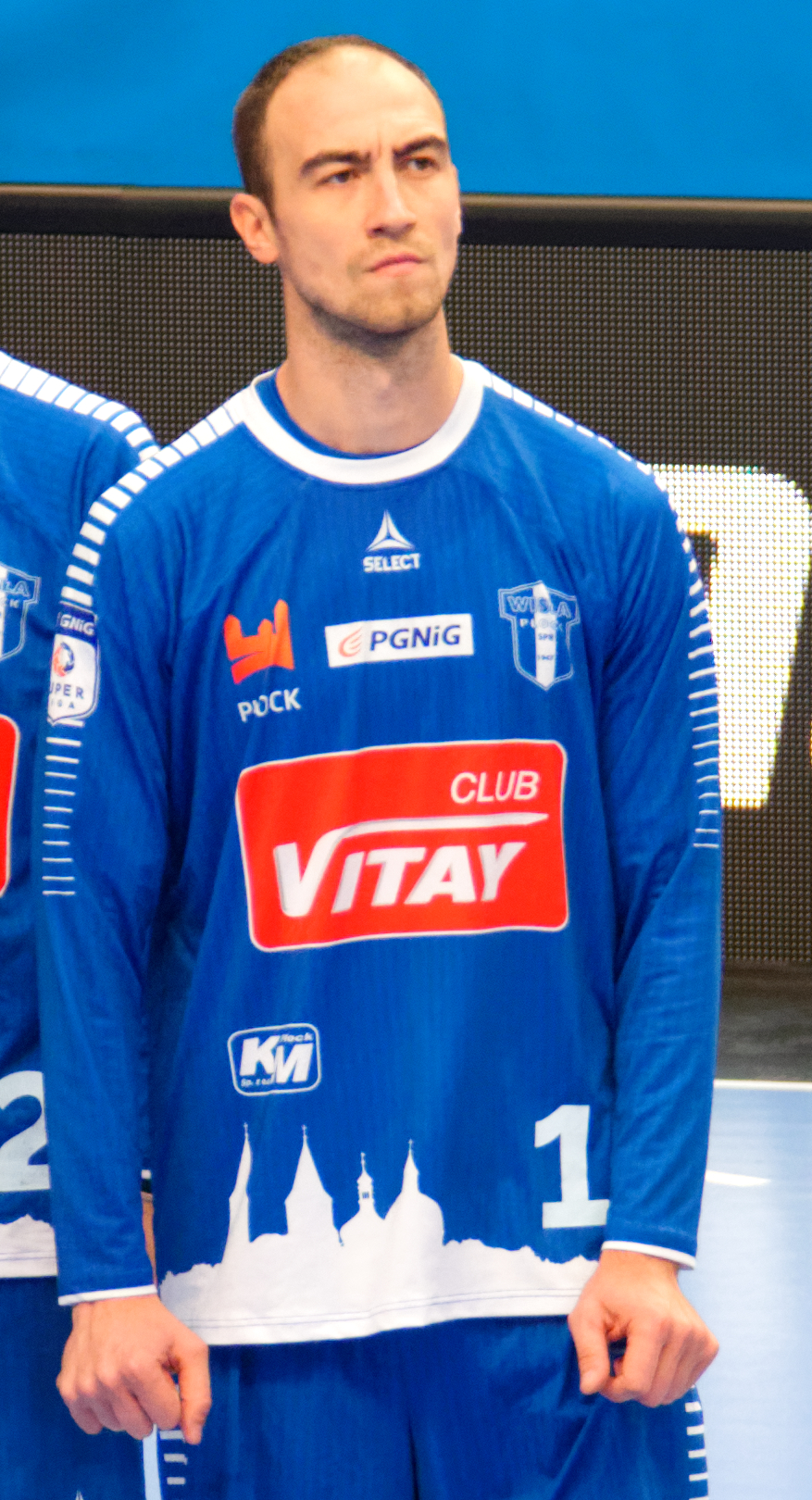

Personal information
- Full name: Valentin Marian Ghionea
- Nationality: Romanian
- Born: 29 April 1984 (age 42) Craiova, Romania
- Height: 1.89 m (6 ft 2 in)

Sport
- Sport: Handball
- Position: Right wing
- Current club: CSA Steaua București
- Number: 15

Senior clubs
- Years: Team
- 2003–2005: HC Minaur Baia Mare
- 2005–2007: Dinamo Baumit București
- 2007–2010: SC Pick Szeged
- 2010–2011: UCM Reșița
- 2011: Universitatea Cluj-Napoca
- 2011–2012: HCM Constanța
- 2012–2018: Wisła Płock
- 2018–2020: Sporting CP
- 2020–2023: CS Dinamo București
- 2023 -: CSA Steaua București
National team
Years	Team	Apps	(Gls)
2002–	Romania	134	(681)

Valentin Marian Ghionea (born 29 April 1984 in Craiova) is a Romanian handballer who plays for Steaua București and the Romanian national team.

== Achievements ==
- Liga Națională:
  - Winner: 2005, 2012, 2021,2022, 2023
- Cupa României:
  - Winner: 2010, 2012,2020,2021,2022
- Mistrzostwa Polski:
  - Silver Medallist: 2013, 2014, 2015, 2016,2017,2018
- Puchar Polski:
  - Finalist: 2014, 2015, 2016,2017,2018
- Nemzeti Bajnokság I:
  - Silver Medallist: 2008, 2009, 2010
- Magyar Kupa:
  - Winner: 2008
  - Finalist: 2009, 2010
- EHF Cup Winners' Cup:
  - Quarterfinalist: 2009, 2011
- EHF Challenge Cup:
  - Quarterfinalist: 2004, 2005

Campeonato Placard Andebol : Silver medalist:2019,2020 Champions league :15 seasons participation

== Individual awards ==
European championship junior (Riga)Best right wing of the tournament

- Romanian Handballer of the Year: 2008, 2015
- Liga Națională Top Scorer: 2005, 2007
