= Jānis Pavlovičs =

Latvian handball player (born 1984)

Personal information
- Nationality: Latvian
- Born: 16 September 1984 (age 42)
- Height: 1.84 m (6 ft 0 in)

Sport
- Sport: Handball
- Position: Right wing
- Current club: Sandefjord TIF
- Number: 77
National team
Years	Team	Apps	(Gls)
–	Latvia	101	(297)

Jānis Pavlovičs (born 16 September 1984) is a Latvian handball player for SK Latgols and the Latvian national team.

He represented Latvia at the 2020 European Men's Handball Championship. This was Latvias first ever appearance at a major international tournament. They finished 24th out of 24 teams.
