= Dainis Krištopāns =

Latvian handball player (born 1990)

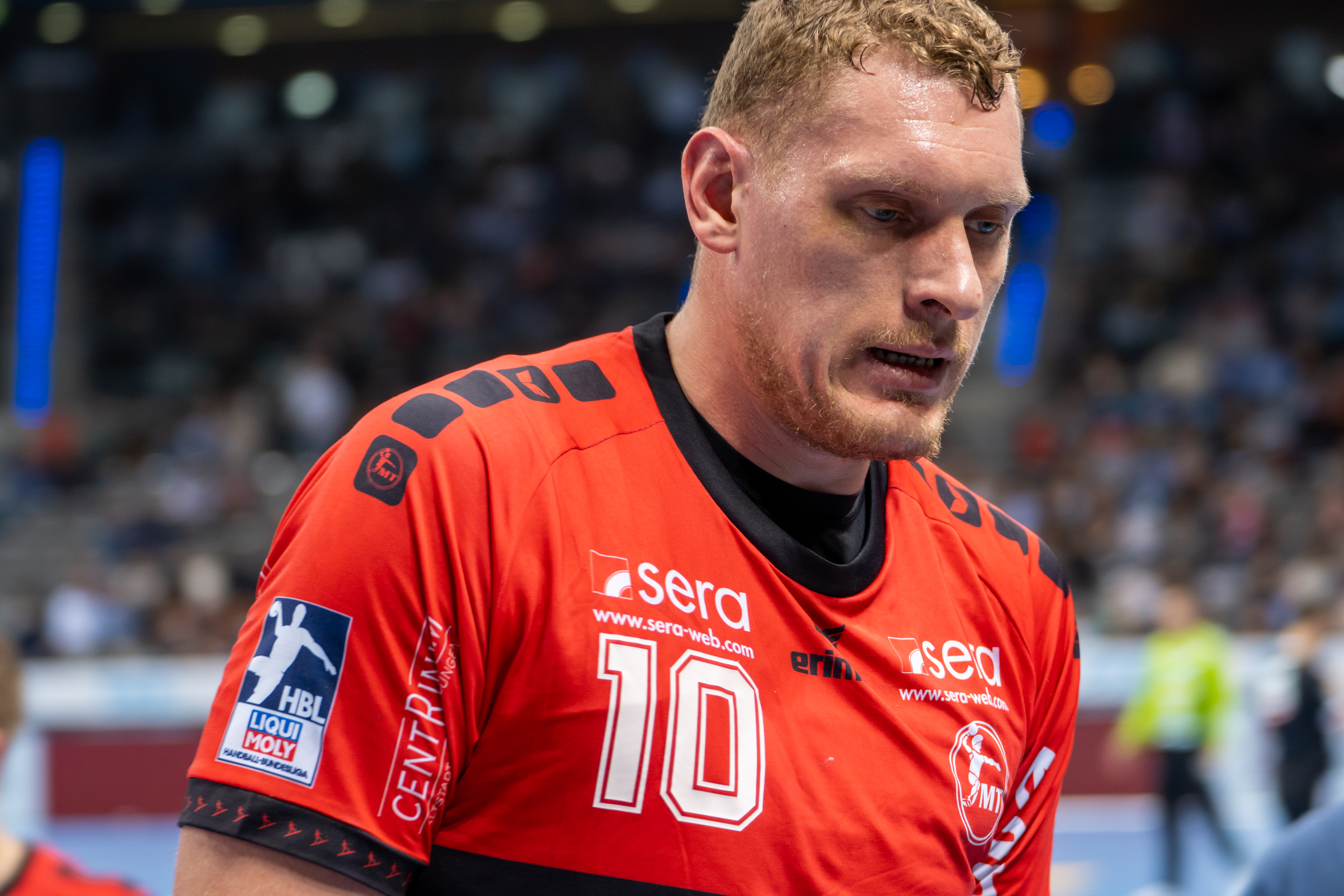
- Krištopāns for MT Melsungen

Personal information
- Nationality: Latvian
- Born: 27 September 1990 (age 36) Ludza, Latvia
- Height: 2.15 m (7 ft 1 in)

Sport
- Sport: Handball
- Position: Right back
- Current club: MT Melsungen
- Number: 10

Senior clubs
- Years: Team
- –2009: SK Latgols
- 2009–2015: HT Tatran Prešov
- 2015: Al Rayyan
- 2015–2017: HC Meshkov Brest
- 2017–2020: RK Vardar
- 2020: Füchse Berlin
- 2020–2023: Paris Saint-Germain
- 2023–: MT Melsungen
National team
Years	Team	Apps	(Gls)
2013–	Latvia	77	(346)

Dainis Krištopāns (born 27 September 1990) is a Latvian professional handball player for MT Melsungen and the Latvian national team.

He is one of the tallest handball players in the world with 215 cm. His weight is 135 kg. He represented Latvia at the 2020 European Men's Handball Championship. This was Latvias first ever appearance at a major international tournament. They finished 24th out of 24 teams.
