= Latvia men's national handball team =

Latvia

Information
- Association: Latvian Handball Federation (Latvijas Handbola federācija)
- Coach: Davor Čutura
- Assistant coach: Andrejs Narnickis; Arnolds Straume; Ēriks Visockis
- Captain: Dainis Krištopāns
- Most caps: Jānis Pavlovičs (101)
- Most goals: Dainis Krištopāns (346)

Colours
1st	2nd

Results

European Championship
- Appearances: 1 (First in 2020)
- Best result: 24th (2020)
- Last updated on Unknown.

The Latvia national handball team is the national handball team of Latvia and is controlled by the Latvian Handball Federation. It has competed since 1993, playing its opening match in the 1994 European Championship qualifiers against Cyprus on 15 April 1993 in Nicosia, winning 32:28.

In 2019 the team qualified for the 2020 European Championships for the first time in their history, previously reaching the qualification play-off stage in 2005. The team has not yet qualified for neither the Olympic Games nor World Championships, with their best results so far being participation in the world qualifiers play-offs in 2004 and 2016.

To this date Andris Gulbis has had the longest stint managing the team, working in 1998 and from 2005 to 2010. From 2017 til the end of Euro 2020 the team was managed by former player Armands Uščins. The current head coach is Sandris Veršakovs.

== Competitive record ==
=== European Championship ===
European Championship record
Year	Round	Position	GP	W	D	L	GF	GA
(Portugal) 1994	did not qualify							
(Spain) 1996	did not qualify							
(Italy) 1998	did not qualify							
(Croatia) 2000	did not qualify							
(Sweden) 2002	did not qualify							
(Slovenia) 2004	did not qualify							
(Switzerland) 2006	did not qualify							
(Norway) 2008	did not qualify							
(Austria) 2010	did not qualify							
(Serbia) 2012	did not qualify							
(Denmark) 2014	did not qualify							
(Poland) 2016	did not qualify							
(Croatia) 2018	did not qualify							
(Austria) / (Norway) / (Sweden) 2020	Preliminary round	24	3	0	0	3	73	93
(Hungary) (Slovakia) 2022	did not qualify							
(Germany) 2024	did not qualify							
(Denmark) (Norway) (Sweden) 2026	did not qualify							
(Portugal) (Spain) (Switzerland) 2028	to be determined							
(Czech Republic) (Denmark) (Poland) 2030	to be determined							
(France) (Germany) 2032	to be determined							
Total	1/20	–	3	0	0	3	73	93

=== IHF Emerging Nations Championship ===
- 2015 – 1st place

== Team ==
=== Current squad ===
Squad for the 2020 European Men's Handball Championship.

Head coach: Armands Uščins

No.	Pos.	Name	Date of birth (age)	Height	App.	Goals	Club
5	CB	Māris Veršakovs	13 January 1986 (age 40)	1.92 m	93	249	(Latvia) ZRHK Tenax Dobele
6	RW	Uvis Stazdiņš	5 October 1999 (age 27)	1.80 m	16	22	(Estonia) HC Kehra
7	LB	Aivis Jurdžs	24 August 1983 (age 43)	1.97 m	87	330	(Latvia) ZRHK Tenax Dobele
10	RB	Dainis Krištopāns	27 September 1990 (age 36)	2.14 m	77	346	(North Macedonia) Vardar
12	GK	Edgars Kukša	26 January 1990 (age 36)	1.91 m	80	0	(Germany) OHV Aurich
14	LW	Oskars Arājs	4 August 1990 (age 36)	1.88 m	42	44	(Latvia) ZRHK Tenax Dobele
16	GK	Raitis Puriņš	20 May 1988 (age 38)	1.90 m	41	0	(Latvia) Celtnieks Rīga
17	LB	Nils Kreicbergs	23 May 1996 (age 30)	1.92 m	48	93	(Finland) Riihimäki Cocks
19	RW	Andis Ērmanis	21 May 1990 (age 36)	1.68 m	54	19	(Latvia) ZRHK Tenax Dobele
27	P	Ingars Dude	1 January 1987 (age 39)	1.95 m	73	152	(France) Limoges Hand 87
33	RB	Ģirts Lilienfelds	4 December 1982 (age 43)	1.89 m	84	215	(Germany) HSC 2000 Coburg
35	P	Egils Politers	18 February 1990 (age 36)	1.95 m	41	54	(Latvia) ZRHK Tenax Dobele
44	RB	Evars Klešniks	18 May 1980 (age 46)	1.99 m	73	241	(Germany) LiT Tribe Germania
71	LW	Rihards Leja	28 July 1992 (age 34)	1.87 m	27	30	(Latvia) Celtnieks Rīga
76	CB	Austris Tuminskis	7 June 1990 (age 36)	1.98 m	58	119	(Germany) EHV Aue
77	RW	Jānis Pavlovičs	16 September 1984 (age 42)	1.84 m	101	297	(Norway) Sandefjord TIF

=== Notable players ===
- Aivis Jurdžs
- Evars Klešniks
- Dainis Krištopāns
- Ēriks Velde – a member of the 1964 World Men's Handball Championship All-Star Team
