= Aivis Jurdžs =

Latvian handball player (born 1983)

Personal information
- Nationality: Latvian
- Born: 24 August 1983 (age 43) Līvāni, Latvia
- Height: 1.97 m (6 ft 6 in)

Sport
- Sport: Handball
- Position: Left back
- Current club: TV Emsdetten
- Number: 77

Senior clubs
- Years: Team
- –2009: ASK Riga
- 2009–2013: TSV Hannover-Burgdorf
- 2013–2015: ThSV Eisenach
- 2015–2019: SC DHfK Leipzig
- 2019–2020: Tenax Dobele
- 2020–: TV Emsdetten
National team
Years	Team	Apps	(Gls)
–	Latvia	87	(330)

Aivis Jurdžs (born 24 August 1983) is a Latvian handball player for German club TV Emsdetten and the Latvian national team.

He represented Latvia at the 2020 European Men's Handball Championship. This was Latvias first ever appearance at a major international tournament. They finished 24th out of 24 teams.
