= 2022 European Men's Handball Championship qualification =

Qualification for the 2022 European Men's Handball Championship

Logo

The 2022 European Men's Handball Championship qualification was a handball competition organized by the European Handball Federation (EHF) to determine 20 of the 24 men's national teams competing in the 2022 European Men's Handball Championship final tournament. They joined the other four teams already qualified: Hungary and Slovakia, as final tournament co-hosts, and Spain and Croatia, who finished in the top two positions in the previous championship. Those four played in the EHF Euro Cup.

This qualification competition was being disputed by a total of 40 national teams in three phases between January 2019 and May 2021.

== Qualification system ==
The campaign was split into two distinct qualification phases and a relegation round.

Qualification phase 1 comprises teams which didn't participate at the 2020 EHF Euro qualification Phase 2. The two best teams advanced to the relegation round.

In the relegation round, the two teams that advanced from phase 1 were joined by the highest ranked European team at the 2019 IHF Emerging Nations Championship and they faced the three lowest ranked fourth-placed teams from the 2020 EHF Euro qualification. Three winners of those elimination matches advanced to the qualification phase 2.

Qualification phase 2 comprised three winners from the relegation round along with 29 teams which participated at either the 2020 EHF Euro or the qualification phase 2.

== Qualification Phase 1 ==
=== Seeding ===
The draw for the qualification round 1 was held on 28 September 2018 in Vienna, Austria. This qualification was played in a tournament format, with the teams able to choose whether they wanted to play on 4 to 6 January or 11 to 13 January 2019.

| Pot 1 | Pot 2 | Pot 3 | Pot 4 |
|---|---|---|---|
| Cyprus; Luxembourg | Great Britain; Georgia | Azerbaijan; Ireland | Bulgaria; Malta |

=== Groups ===
==== Group A ====
| Pos | Team | Pld | W | D | L | GF | GA | GD | Pts | Qualification |
|---|---|---|---|---|---|---|---|---|---|---|
| 1 | Luxembourg (H) | 3 | 3 | 0 | 0 | 100 | 54 | +46 | 6 | Relegation round |
| 2 | Bulgaria | 3 | 2 | 0 | 1 | 76 | 84 | −8 | 4 | |
| 3 | Great Britain | 3 | 1 | 0 | 2 | 71 | 79 | −8 | 2 | |
| 4 | Ireland | 3 | 0 | 0 | 3 | 72 | 102 | −30 | 0 | |

Source: EHF
Rules for classification: 1) points; 2) head-to-head points; 3) head-to-head goal difference; 4) head-to-head number of goals scored; 5) goal difference.
(H) Hosts

| 11 January 2019; 17:00 | Great Britain | 20–24 | Bulgaria | Centre National Sportif d'Coque, Luxembourg City; Attendance: 250; Referees: Fremstad, Pedersen (NOR) |
| 11 January 2019; 17:00 | Da Silva, Negrete 6 | (7–10) | Balchev 5 | Centre National Sportif d'Coque, Luxembourg City; Attendance: 250; Referees: Fremstad, Pedersen (NOR) |
| 11 January 2019; 17:00 | 1× (yellow card) 3× (suspension) 1× (red card) | Report | 3× (yellow card) 7× (suspension) | Centre National Sportif d'Coque, Luxembourg City; Attendance: 250; Referees: Fremstad, Pedersen (NOR) |

| 11 January 2019; 20:00 | Luxembourg | 35–18 | Ireland | Centre National Sportif d'Coque, Luxembourg City; Attendance: 550; Referees: Ivanović, Vujisić (MNE) |
| 11 January 2019; 20:00 | four players 4 | (14–7) | J. Grace 7 | Centre National Sportif d'Coque, Luxembourg City; Attendance: 550; Referees: Ivanović, Vujisić (MNE) |
| 11 January 2019; 20:00 | 2× (yellow card) 2× (suspension) | Report | 3× (yellow card) 3× (suspension) | Centre National Sportif d'Coque, Luxembourg City; Attendance: 550; Referees: Ivanović, Vujisić (MNE) |

| 12 January 2019; 15:00 | Ireland | 26–32 | Great Britain | Centre National Sportif d'Coque, Luxembourg City; Attendance: 200; Referees: Fremstad, Pedersen (NOR) |
| 12 January 2019; 15:00 | Meyer 9 | (14–17) | Da Silva, Negrete 7 | Centre National Sportif d'Coque, Luxembourg City; Attendance: 200; Referees: Fremstad, Pedersen (NOR) |
| 12 January 2019; 15:00 | 2× (yellow card) 6× (suspension) | Report | 1× (yellow card) 5× (suspension) | Centre National Sportif d'Coque, Luxembourg City; Attendance: 200; Referees: Fremstad, Pedersen (NOR) |

| 12 January 2019; 18:00 | Bulgaria | 17–36 | Luxembourg | Centre National Sportif d'Coque, Luxembourg City; Attendance: 1,150; Referees: Ivanović, Vujisić (MNE) |
| 12 January 2019; 18:00 | Balchev 6 | (8–15) | Wirtz 11 | Centre National Sportif d'Coque, Luxembourg City; Attendance: 1,150; Referees: Ivanović, Vujisić (MNE) |
| 12 January 2019; 18:00 | 1× (yellow card) 7× (suspension) | Report | 2× (yellow card) 8× (suspension) | Centre National Sportif d'Coque, Luxembourg City; Attendance: 1,150; Referees: Ivanović, Vujisić (MNE) |

| 13 January 2019; 14:00 | Ireland | 28–35 | Bulgaria | Centre National Sportif d'Coque, Luxembourg City; Attendance: 200; Referees: Fremstad, Pedersen (NOR) |
| 13 January 2019; 14:00 | J. Grace 10 | (13–17) | Dzhempereiev 9 | Centre National Sportif d'Coque, Luxembourg City; Attendance: 200; Referees: Fremstad, Pedersen (NOR) |
| 13 January 2019; 14:00 | 1× (yellow card) 6× (suspension) | Report | 6× (suspension) | Centre National Sportif d'Coque, Luxembourg City; Attendance: 200; Referees: Fremstad, Pedersen (NOR) |

| 13 January 2019; 17:00 | Luxembourg | 29–19 | Great Britain | Centre National Sportif d'Coque, Luxembourg City; Attendance: 1,000; Referees: Ivanović, Vujisić (MNE) |
| 13 January 2019; 17:00 | three players 5 | (15–6) | Edgar 7 | Centre National Sportif d'Coque, Luxembourg City; Attendance: 1,000; Referees: Ivanović, Vujisić (MNE) |
| 13 January 2019; 17:00 | 2× (yellow card) 3× (suspension) | Report | 2× (yellow card) 4× (suspension) 1× (red card) | Centre National Sportif d'Coque, Luxembourg City; Attendance: 1,000; Referees: Ivanović, Vujisić (MNE) |

==== Group B ====
| Pos | Team | Pld | W | D | L | GF | GA | GD | Pts | Qualification |
|---|---|---|---|---|---|---|---|---|---|---|
| 1 | Cyprus | 3 | 3 | 0 | 0 | 88 | 61 | +27 | 6 | Relegation round |
| 2 | Georgia | 3 | 2 | 0 | 1 | 102 | 71 | +31 | 4 | |
| 3 | Azerbaijan | 3 | 1 | 0 | 2 | 69 | 79 | −10 | 2 | |
| 4 | Malta (H) | 3 | 0 | 0 | 3 | 65 | 113 | −48 | 0 | |

Source: EHF
Rules for classification: 1) points; 2) head-to-head points; 3) head-to-head goal difference; 4) head-to-head number of goals scored; 5) goal difference.
(H) Hosts

| 11 January 2019; 17:00 | Cyprus | 25–17 | Azerbaijan | Cottonera Sports Complex, Cospicua; Attendance: 80; Referees: Bozhinovski, Nachevski (MKD) |
| 11 January 2019; 17:00 | Argyrou 7 | (13–10) | Askerov, Nazaraliyev 3 | Cottonera Sports Complex, Cospicua; Attendance: 80; Referees: Bozhinovski, Nachevski (MKD) |
| 11 January 2019; 17:00 | 3× (yellow card) 6× (suspension) | Report | 1× (yellow card) 2× (suspension) | Cottonera Sports Complex, Cospicua; Attendance: 80; Referees: Bozhinovski, Nachevski (MKD) |

| 11 January 2019; 19:30 | Georgia | 48–21 | Malta | Cottonera Sports Complex, Cospicua; Attendance: 350; Referees: Carmaux, Mursch (FRA) |
| 11 January 2019; 19:30 | Tskhovrebadze 11 | (29–9) | Di Pilato 5 | Cottonera Sports Complex, Cospicua; Attendance: 350; Referees: Carmaux, Mursch (FRA) |
| 11 January 2019; 19:30 | 2× (yellow card) 3× (suspension) | Report | 2× (yellow card) 2× (suspension) | Cottonera Sports Complex, Cospicua; Attendance: 350; Referees: Carmaux, Mursch (FRA) |

| 12 January 2019; 16:00 | Azerbaijan | 25–30 | Georgia | Cottonera Sports Complex, Cospicua; Attendance: 100; Referees: Bozhinovski, Nachevski (MKD) |
| 12 January 2019; 16:00 | Aydamirov 9 | (15–16) | Chanturia, Tskhovrebadze 6 | Cottonera Sports Complex, Cospicua; Attendance: 100; Referees: Bozhinovski, Nachevski (MKD) |
| 12 January 2019; 16:00 | 3× (yellow card) 5× (suspension) | Report | 3× (yellow card) 5× (suspension) 1× (red card) | Cottonera Sports Complex, Cospicua; Attendance: 100; Referees: Bozhinovski, Nachevski (MKD) |

| 12 January 2019; 18:30 | Malta | 20–38 | Cyprus | Cottonera Sports Complex, Cospicua; Attendance: 400; Referees: Carmaux, Mursch (FRA) |
| 12 January 2019; 18:30 | Mifsud 7 | (7–17) | Ioannou 7 | Cottonera Sports Complex, Cospicua; Attendance: 400; Referees: Carmaux, Mursch (FRA) |
| 12 January 2019; 18:30 | 2× (yellow card) 5× (suspension) | Report | 3× (yellow card) 4× (suspension) | Cottonera Sports Complex, Cospicua; Attendance: 400; Referees: Carmaux, Mursch (FRA) |

| 13 January 2019; 15:00 | Cyprus | 25–24 | Georgia | Cottonera Sports Complex, Cospicua; Attendance: 150; Referees: Carmaux, Mursch (FRA) |
| 13 January 2019; 15:00 | Argyrou 9 | (14–12) | Tskhovrebadze 11 | Cottonera Sports Complex, Cospicua; Attendance: 150; Referees: Carmaux, Mursch (FRA) |
| 13 January 2019; 15:00 | 1× (yellow card) 6× (suspension) | Report | 3× (yellow card) 3× (suspension) | Cottonera Sports Complex, Cospicua; Attendance: 150; Referees: Carmaux, Mursch (FRA) |

| 13 January 2019; 17:30 | Azerbaijan | 27–24 | Malta | Cottonera Sports Complex, Cospicua; Attendance: 450; Referees: Bozhinovski, Nachevski (MKD) |
| 13 January 2019; 17:30 | Aydamirov 9 | (16–11) | Di Pilato 6 | Cottonera Sports Complex, Cospicua; Attendance: 450; Referees: Bozhinovski, Nachevski (MKD) |
| 13 January 2019; 17:30 | 2× (yellow card) 3× (suspension) | Report | 3× (yellow card) 3× (suspension) | Cottonera Sports Complex, Cospicua; Attendance: 450; Referees: Bozhinovski, Nachevski (MKD) |

== IHF Emerging Nations Championship ==
Unlike previous editions, single participation at this tournament was not possible. Only teams participating at the qualification phase 1 and failing to advance, earned a right to play. The best ranked European team qualified for the relegation round.

| Rank | Team |
|---|---|
| Gold medal | Georgia |
| 2 | Bulgaria |
| 3 | Great Britain |
| 4 | Azerbaijan |
| 5 | Ireland |
| 6 | Malta |

- Note: Ranking of exclusively European teams is displayed.

== Relegation from the previous qualification cycle ==
The three lowest ranked among fourth-placed teams in the 2020 European Men's Handball Championship qualification, apart from Slovakia as co-host nation, played in the relegation round. The other four teams entered qualification phase 2.

| Pos | Grp | Team | Pld | W | D | L | GF | GA | GD | Pts | Promotion, qualification or relegation |
|---|---|---|---|---|---|---|---|---|---|---|---|
| 1 | 3 | Greece | 6 | 1 | 1 | 4 | 145 | 168 | −23 | 3 | Qualification Phase 2 |
| 2 | 1 | Kosovo | 6 | 1 | 1 | 4 | 118 | 172 | −54 | 3 | Qualification Phase 2 |
| 3 | 6 | Romania | 6 | 1 | 0 | 5 | 129 | 157 | −28 | 2 | Qualification Phase 2 |
| 4 | 8 | Faroe Islands | 6 | 0 | 1 | 5 | 131 | 171 | −40 | 1 | Qualification Phase 2 |
| 5 | 2 | Belgium | 6 | 0 | 1 | 5 | 144 | 186 | −42 | 1 | Relegation Round |
| 6 | 7 | Slovakia | 6 | 0 | 0 | 6 | 129 | 155 | −26 | 0 | Final tournament (co-host) |
| 7 | 4 | Estonia | 6 | 0 | 0 | 6 | 142 | 185 | −43 | 0 | Relegation Round |
| 8 | 5 | Finland | 6 | 0 | 0 | 6 | 131 | 185 | −54 | 0 | Relegation Round |

Source: Eurohandball
Rules for classification: 1) points; 2) goal difference; 3) number of goals scored.

== Relegation round ==
=== Seeding ===
The draw for EHF EURO 2022 Relegation Round took place at the EHF Office on 23 July 2019. Three lowest ranked sides from EHF EURO 2020 Qualification Phase 2 were seeded teams while qualification phase 1 participants were unseeded teams.

| Pot 1 | Pot 2 |
|---|---|
| Cyprus; Georgia; Luxembourg | Belgium; Estonia; Finland |

=== Overview ===
The first legs were played on 15 and 16 January and the second legs on 19 January 2020.

| Team 1 | Agg. | Team 2 | 1st leg | 2nd leg |
|---|---|---|---|---|
| Georgia | 45–61 | Finland | 24–24 | 21–37 |
| Luxembourg | 53–69 | Estonia | 33–38 | 20–31 |
| Belgium | 55–23 | Cyprus | 24–7 | 31–16 |

==== Matches ====
| 16 January 2020; 18:00 | Georgia | 24–24 | Finland | Tbilisi Sports Palace, Tbilisi; Attendance: 850; Referees: Ben-Dan, Faran (ISR) |
| 16 January 2020; 18:00 | Tskhovrebadze 8 | (11–10) | Tamminen 6 | Tbilisi Sports Palace, Tbilisi; Attendance: 850; Referees: Ben-Dan, Faran (ISR) |
| 16 January 2020; 18:00 | 2× (yellow card) 4× (suspension) | Report | 3× (yellow card) 6× (suspension) | Tbilisi Sports Palace, Tbilisi; Attendance: 850; Referees: Ben-Dan, Faran (ISR) |

| 19 January 2020; 16:00 | Finland | 37–21 | Georgia | Cocks Areena, Riihimäki; Attendance: 800; Referees: Hofer, Schmidhuber (AUT) |
| 19 January 2020; 16:00 | Rönnberg 8 | (14–12) | Orjonikidze, Tskhovrebadze 7 | Cocks Areena, Riihimäki; Attendance: 800; Referees: Hofer, Schmidhuber (AUT) |
| 19 January 2020; 16:00 | 2× (yellow card) 4× (suspension) 1× (red card) | Report | 2× (yellow card) 5× (suspension) | Cocks Areena, Riihimäki; Attendance: 800; Referees: Hofer, Schmidhuber (AUT) |

Finland won 61–45 on aggregate.

| 16 January 2020; 19:30 | Luxembourg | 33–38 | Estonia | d'Coque, Luxembourg City; Attendance: 500; Referees: Martins, Martins (POR) |
| 16 January 2020; 19:30 | Wirtz 11 | (17–18) | Toom 10 | d'Coque, Luxembourg City; Attendance: 500; Referees: Martins, Martins (POR) |
| 16 January 2020; 19:30 | 2× (yellow card) 3× (suspension) | Report | 1× (yellow card) 2× (suspension) | d'Coque, Luxembourg City; Attendance: 500; Referees: Martins, Martins (POR) |

| 19 January 2020; 13:45 | Estonia | 31–20 | Luxembourg | Mesikäpa Hall, Pölva; Attendance: 600; Referees: Bounouara, Sami (FRA) |
| 19 January 2020; 13:45 | four players 5 | (14–13) | Wirtz 6 | Mesikäpa Hall, Pölva; Attendance: 600; Referees: Bounouara, Sami (FRA) |
| 19 January 2020; 13:45 | 2× (yellow card) 3× (suspension) | Report | 1× (yellow card) 4× (suspension) | Mesikäpa Hall, Pölva; Attendance: 600; Referees: Bounouara, Sami (FRA) |

Estonia won 69–53 on aggregate.

| 15 January 2020; 20:10 | Belgium | 24–7 | Cyprus | Sporthal Alverberg, Hasselt; Attendance: 1,450; Referees: Čerņavskis, Bogdanovs (LAT) |
| 15 January 2020; 20:10 | D'Hanis 6 | (13–3) | And. Ioannou 3 | Sporthal Alverberg, Hasselt; Attendance: 1,450; Referees: Čerņavskis, Bogdanovs (LAT) |
| 15 January 2020; 20:10 | 2× (yellow card) 6× (suspension) | Report | 1× (yellow card) 2× (suspension) | Sporthal Alverberg, Hasselt; Attendance: 1,450; Referees: Čerņavskis, Bogdanovs (LAT) |

| 19 January 2020; 19:00 | Cyprus | 16–31 | Belgium | Eleftheria Stadium, Nicosia; Attendance: 300; Referees: Di Domenico, Fornasier (ITA) |
| 19 January 2020; 19:00 | Paraskeva 8 | (8–11) | Denert 7 | Eleftheria Stadium, Nicosia; Attendance: 300; Referees: Di Domenico, Fornasier (ITA) |
| 19 January 2020; 19:00 | 3× (yellow card) 4× (suspension) | Report | 3× (yellow card) 5× (suspension) 1× (red card) | Eleftheria Stadium, Nicosia; Attendance: 300; Referees: Di Domenico, Fornasier (ITA) |

Belgium won 55–23 on aggregate.

== Qualification Phase 2 ==
In this round, pre-qualified teams from the EHF EURO 2020 qualification and final tournaments joined the three winners from the relegation round. The 32 teams were split into eight groups of four, with the winners and runners-up qualifying for the final tournament, together with the four best third-placed teams.

The draw was initially scheduled to take place at the EHF Executive Committee meeting in Bratislava on 23 April 2020. On 13 March 2020, the EHF announced that the draw would be postponed due to the COVID-19 pandemic across Europe, with the new date set for 16 June 2020.

=== Seeding ===
On 2 June 2020, the EHF revealed the seeding pots and the draw procedure. The 32 teams qualified for this stage were seeded in four pots, according to the EHF men's national team ranking. The draw allocated successively the eight teams from Pot 3, followed by the eight teams from Pot 2, Pot 1 and finally Pot 4. For political reasons, Kosovo (Pot 4) was drawn to a group not containing Serbia (Pot 2).

| Pot 1 | Pot 2 | Pot 3 | Pot 4 |
|---|---|---|---|
| Norway; Sweden; Denmark; Germany; France; Slovenia; Czech Republic; Iceland | Austria; Belarus; Portugal; North Macedonia; Serbia; Russia; Montenegro; Netherlands | Switzerland; Lithuania; Romania; Bosnia and Herzegovina; Ukraine; Latvia; Poland; Belgium | Finland; Italy; Turkey; Israel; Estonia; Greece; Kosovo; Faroe Islands |

All times are local.

=== Group 1 ===
| Pos | Team | Pld | W | D | L | GF | GA | GD | Pts | Qualification |
|---|---|---|---|---|---|---|---|---|---|---|
| 1 | Serbia | 6 | 5 | 1 | 0 | 131 | 96 | +35 | 11 | Final tournament |
| 2 | France | 6 | 4 | 1 | 1 | 156 | 114 | +42 | 9 | Final tournament |
| 3 | Greece | 6 | 2 | 0 | 4 | 127 | 144 | −17 | 4 | |
| 4 | Belgium (Note: Belgium withdrew on 8 February 2021, due to the COVID-19 pandemic, and all their games will registered with 0:10 loss.) | 6 | 0 | 0 | 6 | 0 | 60 | −60 | 0 | Withdrawn |

Source: EHF
Rules for classification: 1) points; 2) head-to-head points; 3) head-to-head goal difference; 4) head-to-head number of goals scored; 5) goal difference.
Notes:

| 5 January 2021; 17:00 | Serbia | 27–24 | France | Crystal Hall, Zrenjanin; Attendance: 0 (Note: The match was played behind closed doors due to the COVID-19 pandemic.); Referees: Mitrevski, Todorovski (MKD) |
| 5 January 2021; 17:00 | Kukić 6 | (14–11) | Mahé 6 | Crystal Hall, Zrenjanin; Attendance: 0 Referees: Mitrevski, Todorovski (MKD) |
| 5 January 2021; 17:00 | 2× (yellow card) 4× (suspension) | Report | 2× (yellow card) 3× (suspension) | Crystal Hall, Zrenjanin; Attendance: 0 Referees: Mitrevski, Todorovski (MKD) |

| 9 January 2021; 19:00 | France | 26–26 | Serbia | Palais des Sports Robert Oubron, Créteil; Attendance: 0 Referees: Martins, Martins (POR) |
| 9 January 2021; 19:00 | Fabregas 5 | (12–15) | Marsenić 8 | Palais des Sports Robert Oubron, Créteil; Attendance: 0 Referees: Martins, Martins (POR) |
| 9 January 2021; 19:00 | 1× (yellow card) 2× (suspension) | Report | 1× (yellow card) 5× (suspension) | Palais des Sports Robert Oubron, Créteil; Attendance: 0 Referees: Martins, Martins (POR) |

| 13 January 2021 (Note: The matches, originally scheduled for the November 2020 window, were postponed due to the COVID-19 pandemic.); 17:00 | Serbia | 31–21 | Greece | Crystal Hall, Zrenjanin; Attendance: 0 Referees: Pirvu, Potîrniche (ROU) |
| 13 January 2021; 17:00 | Radivojević 8 | (15–12) | Mylonas 6 | Crystal Hall, Zrenjanin; Attendance: 0 Referees: Pirvu, Potîrniche (ROU) |
| 13 January 2021; 17:00 | 2× (yellow card) 4× (suspension) | Report | 1× (yellow card) 2× (suspension) | Crystal Hall, Zrenjanin; Attendance: 0 Referees: Pirvu, Potîrniche (ROU) |

| 27 April 2021; 20:00 | Greece | 31–40 | France | Korydallos Sports Hall, Piraeus; Attendance: 70; Referees: Kaluđerović, Vujačić (MNE) |
| 27 April 2021; 20:00 | Iliopoulos 7 | (16–22) | Fabregas, Mahé 6 | Korydallos Sports Hall, Piraeus; Attendance: 70; Referees: Kaluđerović, Vujačić (MNE) |
| 27 April 2021; 20:00 | 2× (yellow card) 9× (suspension) | Report | 2× (yellow card) 2× (suspension) 1× (red card) | Korydallos Sports Hall, Piraeus; Attendance: 70; Referees: Kaluđerović, Vujačić (MNE) |

| 29 April 2021; 15:00 | Greece | 25–27 | Serbia | Korydallos Sports Hall, Piraeus; Attendance: 80; Referees: Ben-Dan, Faran (ISR) |
| 29 April 2021; 15:00 | Arampatzis 6 | (14–12) | Marsenić 5 | Korydallos Sports Hall, Piraeus; Attendance: 80; Referees: Ben-Dan, Faran (ISR) |
| 29 April 2021; 15:00 | 1× (yellow card) 6× (suspension) 1× (red card) | Report | 2× (yellow card) 6× (suspension) 1× (red card) | Korydallos Sports Hall, Piraeus; Attendance: 80; Referees: Ben-Dan, Faran (ISR) |

| 2 May 2021; 18:00 | France | 46–30 | Greece | Palais des Sports Robert Oubron, Créteil; Attendance: 0 Referees: Doychinov, Goretsov (BUL) |
| 2 May 2021; 18:00 | Descat 8 | (23–13) | Boskos 7 | Palais des Sports Robert Oubron, Créteil; Attendance: 0 Referees: Doychinov, Goretsov (BUL) |
| 2 May 2021; 18:00 | 2× (yellow card) 5× (suspension) | Report | 1× (yellow card) 4× (suspension) | Palais des Sports Robert Oubron, Créteil; Attendance: 0 Referees: Doychinov, Goretsov (BUL) |

=== Group 2 ===
| Pos | Team | Pld | W | D | L | GF | GA | GD | Pts | Qualification |
|---|---|---|---|---|---|---|---|---|---|---|
| 1 | Germany | 6 | 6 | 0 | 0 | 191 | 135 | +56 | 12 | Final tournament |
| 2 | Austria | 6 | 3 | 0 | 3 | 157 | 175 | −18 | 6 | Final tournament |
| 3 | Bosnia and Herzegovina | 6 | 2 | 0 | 4 | 137 | 142 | −5 | 4 | Final tournament |
| 4 | Estonia | 6 | 1 | 0 | 5 | 141 | 174 | −33 | 2 | |

Source: EHF
Rules for classification: 1) points; 2) head-to-head points; 3) head-to-head goal difference; 4) head-to-head number of goals scored; 5) goal difference.

| 4 November 2020; 20:25 | Austria | 31–28 | Estonia | Raiffeisen Sportpark Graz, Graz; Attendance: 0 Referees: Di Domenico, Fornasier (ITA) |
| 4 November 2020; 20:25 | Wagner 7 | (16–16) | Toom 10 | Raiffeisen Sportpark Graz, Graz; Attendance: 0 Referees: Di Domenico, Fornasier (ITA) |
| 4 November 2020; 20:25 | 1× (yellow card) 4× (suspension) | Report | 1× (yellow card) 4× (suspension) | Raiffeisen Sportpark Graz, Graz; Attendance: 0 Referees: Di Domenico, Fornasier (ITA) |

| 5 November 2020; 16:15 | Germany | 25–21 | Bosnia and Herzegovina | ISS Dome, Düsseldorf; Attendance: 0 Referees: Simone, Monitillo (ITA) |
| 5 November 2020; 16:15 | Pekeler 5 | (9–13) | Prce 8 | ISS Dome, Düsseldorf; Attendance: 0 Referees: Simone, Monitillo (ITA) |
| 5 November 2020; 16:15 | 2× (yellow card) 2× (suspension) | Report | 2× (yellow card) 5× (suspension) | ISS Dome, Düsseldorf; Attendance: 0 Referees: Simone, Monitillo (ITA) |

| 8 November 2020; 16:15 | Estonia | 23–35 | Germany | Kalev Sports Hall, Tallinn; Attendance: 0 Referees: Barysas, Petrušis (LTU) |
| 8 November 2020; 16:15 | Toom, Varik 4 | (12–13) | Kühn 9 | Kalev Sports Hall, Tallinn; Attendance: 0 Referees: Barysas, Petrušis (LTU) |
| 8 November 2020; 16:15 | 2× (yellow card) 4× (suspension) | Report | | Kalev Sports Hall, Tallinn; Attendance: 0 Referees: Barysas, Petrušis (LTU) |

| 6 January 2021; 13:45 | Austria | 27–36 | Germany | Raiffeisen Sportpark Graz, Graz; Attendance: 0 Referees: Horváth, Marton (HUN) |
| 6 January 2021; 13:45 | Frimmel, Zivkovic 7 | (16–22) | Schiller 11 | Raiffeisen Sportpark Graz, Graz; Attendance: 0 Referees: Horváth, Marton (HUN) |
| 6 January 2021; 13:45 | 2× (yellow card) 6× (suspension) | Report | 1× (yellow card) 4× (suspension) | Raiffeisen Sportpark Graz, Graz; Attendance: 0 Referees: Horváth, Marton (HUN) |

| 6 January 2021; 19:30 | Estonia | 24–21 | Bosnia and Herzegovina | Mesikäpa Hall, Põlva; Attendance: 0 Referees: Čerņavskis, Bogdanovs (LAT) |
| 6 January 2021; 19:30 | Lees, Toom 8 | (11–14) | Ovčina 5 | Mesikäpa Hall, Põlva; Attendance: 0 Referees: Čerņavskis, Bogdanovs (LAT) |
| 6 January 2021; 19:30 | 2× (yellow card) 2× (suspension) | Report | 1× (yellow card) 3× (suspension) | Mesikäpa Hall, Põlva; Attendance: 0 Referees: Čerņavskis, Bogdanovs (LAT) |

| 10 January 2021; 18:10 | Germany | 34–20 | Austria | Lanxess Arena, Cologne; Attendance: 0 Referees: Pichon, Reveret (FRA) |
| 10 January 2021; 18:10 | Metzner 5 | (19–5) | Hutecek 7 | Lanxess Arena, Cologne; Attendance: 0 Referees: Pichon, Reveret (FRA) |
| 10 January 2021; 18:10 | 2× (yellow card) 5× (suspension) | Report | 1× (yellow card) 4× (suspension) 1× (red card) | Lanxess Arena, Cologne; Attendance: 0 Referees: Pichon, Reveret (FRA) |

| 10 January 2021; 20:00 | Bosnia and Herzegovina | 21–19 | Estonia | Kulturno-sportski centar Bugojno, Bugojno; Attendance: 0 Referees: Backović, Palačković (SVK) |
| 10 January 2021; 20:00 | Panić 5 | (12–9) | Less, Toom 4 | Kulturno-sportski centar Bugojno, Bugojno; Attendance: 0 Referees: Backović, Palačković (SVK) |
| 10 January 2021; 20:00 | 1× (yellow card) 2× (suspension) | Report | 1× (yellow card) 5× (suspension) 1× (red card) | Kulturno-sportski centar Bugojno, Bugojno; Attendance: 0 Referees: Backović, Palačković (SVK) |

| 14 March 2021; 17:00 | Bosnia and Herzegovina | 27–21 | Austria | Kulturno-sportski centar Bugojno, Bugojno; Attendance: 0 Referees: Mandák, Rudinský (SVK) |
| 14 March 2021; 17:00 | Perić 5 | (11–10) | Weber 6 | Kulturno-sportski centar Bugojno, Bugojno; Attendance: 0 Referees: Mandák, Rudinský (SVK) |
| 14 March 2021; 17:00 | 1× (yellow card) 3× (suspension) | Report | 1× (yellow card) 3× (suspension) | Kulturno-sportski centar Bugojno, Bugojno; Attendance: 0 Referees: Mandák, Rudinský (SVK) |

| 29 April 2021; 16:10 | Bosnia and Herzegovina | 24–26 | Germany | Kulturno-sportski centar Bugojno, Bugojno; Attendance: 0 Referees: Jurinović, Mrvica (CRO) |
| 29 April 2021; 16:10 | Perić 6 | (15–15) | Schiller 10 | Kulturno-sportski centar Bugojno, Bugojno; Attendance: 0 Referees: Jurinović, Mrvica (CRO) |
| 29 April 2021; 16:10 | 2× (yellow card) 4× (suspension) | Report | 2× (yellow card) 4× (suspension) | Kulturno-sportski centar Bugojno, Bugojno; Attendance: 0 Referees: Jurinović, Mrvica (CRO) |

| 29 April 2021; 19:30 | Estonia | 27–31 | Austria | Kalev Sports Hall, Tallinn; Attendance: 0 Referees: Canbro, Kliko (SWE) |
| 29 April 2021; 19:30 | Toom 9 | (13–18) | Weber 7 | Kalev Sports Hall, Tallinn; Attendance: 0 Referees: Canbro, Kliko (SWE) |
| 29 April 2021; 19:30 | 2× (yellow card) 4× (suspension) | Report | 3× (yellow card) 2× (suspension) | Kalev Sports Hall, Tallinn; Attendance: 0 Referees: Canbro, Kliko (SWE) |

| 2 May 2021; 18:00 | Germany | 35–20 | Estonia | Porsche-Arena, Stuttgart; Attendance: 0 Referees: Capoccia, Jucker (SUI) |
| 2 May 2021; 18:00 | Schiller 6 | (17–10) | Lees, Toom 5 | Porsche-Arena, Stuttgart; Attendance: 0 Referees: Capoccia, Jucker (SUI) |
| 2 May 2021; 18:00 | 1× (yellow card) | Report | 1× (yellow card) 3× (suspension) | Porsche-Arena, Stuttgart; Attendance: 0 Referees: Capoccia, Jucker (SUI) |

| 2 May 2021; 18:00 | Austria | 27–23 | Bosnia and Herzegovina | Raiffeisen Sportpark Graz, Graz; Attendance: 0 Referees: Horáček, Novotný (CZE) |
| 2 May 2021; 18:00 | Weber 6 | (15–11) | Haseljić 6 | Raiffeisen Sportpark Graz, Graz; Attendance: 0 Referees: Horáček, Novotný (CZE) |
| 2 May 2021; 18:00 | 1× (yellow card) 6× (suspension) 1× (red card) | Report | 1× (yellow card) 4× (suspension) | Raiffeisen Sportpark Graz, Graz; Attendance: 0 Referees: Horáček, Novotný (CZE) |

=== Group 3 ===
| Pos | Team | Pld | W | D | L | GF | GA | GD | Pts | Qualification |
|---|---|---|---|---|---|---|---|---|---|---|
| 1 | Russia | 6 | 4 | 2 | 0 | 171 | 156 | +15 | 10 | Final tournament |
| 2 | Czech Republic | 6 | 3 | 1 | 2 | 163 | 150 | +13 | 7 | Final tournament |
| 3 | Ukraine | 6 | 2 | 1 | 3 | 154 | 158 | −4 | 5 | Final tournament |
| 4 | Faroe Islands | 6 | 1 | 0 | 5 | 140 | 164 | −24 | 2 | |

Source: EHF
Rules for classification: 1) points; 2) head-to-head points; 3) head-to-head goal difference; 4) head-to-head number of goals scored; 5) goal difference.

| 5 November 2020; 18:00 | Ukraine | 27–27 | Russia | Minsk Sports Palace, Minsk, Belarus; Attendance: 387; Referees: Boričić, Marković (SRB) |
| 5 November 2020; 18:00 | Zhukov 7 | (13–16) | Fokin 7 | Minsk Sports Palace, Minsk, Belarus; Attendance: 387; Referees: Boričić, Marković (SRB) |
| 5 November 2020; 18:00 | 2× (yellow card) 6× (suspension) | Report | 3× (yellow card) 4× (suspension) | Minsk Sports Palace, Minsk, Belarus; Attendance: 387; Referees: Boričić, Marković (SRB) |

| 7 November 2020; 15:00 | Russia | 30–28 | Ukraine | Minsk Sports Palace, Minsk, Belarus; Attendance: 373; Referees: Covalciuc, Covalciuc (MDA) |
| 7 November 2020; 15:00 | Soroka 8 | (15–14) | Kravchenko, Zhukov 6 | Minsk Sports Palace, Minsk, Belarus; Attendance: 373; Referees: Covalciuc, Covalciuc (MDA) |
| 7 November 2020; 15:00 | 3× (yellow card) 4× (suspension) | Report | 2× (yellow card) 4× (suspension) | Minsk Sports Palace, Minsk, Belarus; Attendance: 373; Referees: Covalciuc, Covalciuc (MDA) |

| 10 March 2021; 17:30 | Ukraine | 25–21 | Faroe Islands | Palace of Sports, Kyiv; Attendance: 0 Referees: Leszczyński, Piechota (POL) |
| 10 March 2021; 17:30 | Akimenko 7 | (15–13) | Gunnarsson Djurhuus 4 | Palace of Sports, Kyiv; Attendance: 0 Referees: Leszczyński, Piechota (POL) |
| 10 March 2021; 17:30 | 4× (suspension) | Report | 1× (yellow card) 2× (suspension) | Palace of Sports, Kyiv; Attendance: 0 Referees: Leszczyński, Piechota (POL) |

| 10 March 2021; 19:30 | Russia | 28–27 | Czech Republic | Universal Sport Hall Igrovoy, Moscow; Attendance: 350; Referees: Erdoğan, Özdeniz (TUR) |
| 10 March 2021; 19:30 | Kosorotov 6 | (14–13) | Číp 7 | Universal Sport Hall Igrovoy, Moscow; Attendance: 350; Referees: Erdoğan, Özdeniz (TUR) |
| 10 March 2021; 19:30 | 1× (yellow card) 5× (suspension) | Report | 3× (yellow card) 1× (suspension) | Universal Sport Hall Igrovoy, Moscow; Attendance: 350; Referees: Erdoğan, Özdeniz (TUR) |

| 12 March 2021 (Note: The matches, originally scheduled for the January 2021 window, were postponed due to the COVID-19 pandemic.); 20:15 | Czech Republic | 28–20 | Faroe Islands | Sportovní hala Vodova, Brno; Attendance: 0 Referees: Sekulić, Jovandić (SRB) |
| 12 March 2021; 20:15 | Užek 6 | (14–8) | Johansen 4 | Sportovní hala Vodova, Brno; Attendance: 0 Referees: Sekulić, Jovandić (SRB) |
| 12 March 2021; 20:15 | 1× (yellow card) 3× (suspension) | Report | 5× (suspension) | Sportovní hala Vodova, Brno; Attendance: 0 Referees: Sekulić, Jovandić (SRB) |

| 14 March 2021; 18:00 | Faroe Islands | 25–26 | Ukraine | Høllin á Hálsi, Tórshavn; Attendance: 600; Referees: Madsen, Mortensen (DEN) |
| 14 March 2021; 18:00 | Ellefsen á Skipagøtu 7 | (11–16) | Akimenko 8 | Høllin á Hálsi, Tórshavn; Attendance: 600; Referees: Madsen, Mortensen (DEN) |
| 14 March 2021; 18:00 | 1× (yellow card) 4× (suspension) | Report | 1× (yellow card) 5× (suspension) | Høllin á Hálsi, Tórshavn; Attendance: 600; Referees: Madsen, Mortensen (DEN) |

| 14 March 2021; 20:15 | Czech Republic | 27–27 | Russia | Sportovní hala Vodova, Brno; Attendance: 0 Referees: Lah, Sok (SLO) |
| 14 March 2021; 20:15 | Hrstka 5 | (16–14) | Kiselev 6 | Sportovní hala Vodova, Brno; Attendance: 0 Referees: Lah, Sok (SLO) |
| 14 March 2021; 20:15 | 1× (yellow card) 10× (suspension) 1× (red card) | Report | 2× (yellow card) 4× (suspension) | Sportovní hala Vodova, Brno; Attendance: 0 Referees: Lah, Sok (SLO) |

| 28 April 2021; 18:00 | Ukraine | 26–28 | Czech Republic | Citysporthall, Zaporizhia; Attendance: 50; Referees: Pavićević, Ražnatović (MNE) |
| 28 April 2021; 18:00 | Horiha 5 | (12–16) | Bečvář 6 | Citysporthall, Zaporizhia; Attendance: 50; Referees: Pavićević, Ražnatović (MNE) |
| 28 April 2021; 18:00 | 1× (yellow card) 6× (suspension) | Report | 1× (yellow card) 5× (suspension) | Citysporthall, Zaporizhia; Attendance: 50; Referees: Pavićević, Ražnatović (MNE) |

| 28 April 2021; 19:30 | Russia | 31–24 | Faroe Islands | Dynamo Sports Palace, Moscow; Attendance: 510; Referees: Ivanović, Vujisić (MNE) |
| 28 April 2021; 19:30 | Kiselev 7 | (16–10) | Jojic 8 | Dynamo Sports Palace, Moscow; Attendance: 510; Referees: Ivanović, Vujisić (MNE) |
| 28 April 2021; 19:30 | 5× (suspension) | Report | 1× (yellow card) 7× (suspension) | Dynamo Sports Palace, Moscow; Attendance: 510; Referees: Ivanović, Vujisić (MNE) |

| 30 April 2021; 19:45 | Faroe Islands | 27–26 | Czech Republic | Høllin á Hálsi, Tórshavn; Attendance: 895; Referees: Brimvik, Nolsoe (FRO) |
| 30 April 2021; 19:45 | Olsen, Skipagøtu 5 | (11–12) | Klíma 9 | Høllin á Hálsi, Tórshavn; Attendance: 895; Referees: Brimvik, Nolsoe (FRO) |
| 30 April 2021; 19:45 | 3× (yellow card) 2× (suspension) | Report | 2× (yellow card) 6× (suspension) | Høllin á Hálsi, Tórshavn; Attendance: 895; Referees: Brimvik, Nolsoe (FRO) |

| 2 May 2021; 17:00 | Faroe Islands | 23–28 | Russia | Høllin á Hálsi, Tórshavn; Attendance: 1,000; Referees: Martins, Martins (POR) |
| 2 May 2021; 17:00 | Skipagøtu 6 | (11–12) | Kosorotov 8 | Høllin á Hálsi, Tórshavn; Attendance: 1,000; Referees: Martins, Martins (POR) |
| 2 May 2021; 17:00 | 5× (suspension) | Report | 1× (yellow card) 4× (suspension) | Høllin á Hálsi, Tórshavn; Attendance: 1,000; Referees: Martins, Martins (POR) |

| 2 May 2021; 18:00 | Czech Republic | 27–22 | Ukraine | Sportovní hala Vodova, Brno; Attendance: 0 Referees: Nikolov, Nachevski (MKD) |
| 2 May 2021; 18:00 | Klíma 8 | (14–11) | four players 4 | Sportovní hala Vodova, Brno; Attendance: 0 Referees: Nikolov, Nachevski (MKD) |
| 2 May 2021; 18:00 | 7× (suspension) | Report | 1× (yellow card) 3× (suspension) | Sportovní hala Vodova, Brno; Attendance: 0 Referees: Nikolov, Nachevski (MKD) |

=== Group 4 ===
| Pos | Team | Pld | W | D | L | GF | GA | GD | Pts | Qualification |
|---|---|---|---|---|---|---|---|---|---|---|
| 1 | Portugal | 6 | 5 | 0 | 1 | 185 | 158 | +27 | 10 | Final tournament |
| 2 | Iceland | 6 | 4 | 0 | 2 | 188 | 147 | +41 | 8 | Final tournament |
| 3 | Lithuania | 6 | 2 | 0 | 4 | 159 | 189 | −30 | 4 | Final tournament |
| 4 | Israel | 6 | 1 | 0 | 5 | 162 | 200 | −38 | 2 | |

Source: EHF
Rules for classification: 1) points; 2) head-to-head points; 3) head-to-head goal difference; 4) head-to-head number of goals scored; 5) goal difference.

| 4 November 2020; 19:30 | Portugal | 31–22 | Israel | Centro de Desportos e Congressos, Matosinhos; Attendance: 0 Referees: Carmaux, Mursch (FRA) |
| 4 November 2020; 19:30 | four players 4 | (14–12) | Pomeranz 9 | Centro de Desportos e Congressos, Matosinhos; Attendance: 0 Referees: Carmaux, Mursch (FRA) |
| 4 November 2020; 19:30 | 5× (suspension) 1× (red card) | Report | 5× (suspension) | Centro de Desportos e Congressos, Matosinhos; Attendance: 0 Referees: Carmaux, Mursch (FRA) |

| 4 November 2020; 19:45 | Iceland | 36–20 | Lithuania | Laugardalshöll, Reykjavík; Attendance: 0 Referees: Hansen, Madsen (DEN) |
| 4 November 2020; 19:45 | Styrmisson 8 | (19–10) | Malašinskas, Simėnas 5 | Laugardalshöll, Reykjavík; Attendance: 0 Referees: Hansen, Madsen (DEN) |
| 4 November 2020; 19:45 | 1× (yellow card) 3× (suspension) | Report | 4× (suspension) 1× (red card) | Laugardalshöll, Reykjavík; Attendance: 0 Referees: Hansen, Madsen (DEN) |

| 8 November 2020; 16:00 | Lithuania | 26–34 | Portugal | Siemens Arena, Vilnius; Attendance: 0 Referees: Čerņavskis, Bogdanovs (LAT) |
| 8 November 2020; 16:00 | Urbonas 5 | (14–18) | Portela 5 | Siemens Arena, Vilnius; Attendance: 0 Referees: Čerņavskis, Bogdanovs (LAT) |
| 8 November 2020; 16:00 | 1× (yellow card) 4× (suspension) | Report | 1× (yellow card) 3× (suspension) | Siemens Arena, Vilnius; Attendance: 0 Referees: Čerņavskis, Bogdanovs (LAT) |

| 6 January 2021; 19:30 | Portugal | 26–24 | Iceland | Centro de Desportos e Congressos, Matosinhos; Attendance: 0 Referees: Baumgart, Wild (GER) |
| 6 January 2021; 19:30 | Portela 7 | (14–11) | Elísson, Jónsson 6 | Centro de Desportos e Congressos, Matosinhos; Attendance: 0 Referees: Baumgart, Wild (GER) |
| 6 January 2021; 19:30 | 1× (yellow card) 4× (suspension) 1× (red card) | Report | 3× (yellow card) 2× (suspension) 1× (red card) | Centro de Desportos e Congressos, Matosinhos; Attendance: 0 Referees: Baumgart, Wild (GER) |

| 10 January 2021; 16:00 | Iceland | 32–23 | Portugal | Laugardalshöll, Reykjavík; Attendance: 0 Referees: Līcis, Sondors (LAT) |
| 10 January 2021; 16:00 | Elísson 9 | (12–13) | Areia Rodrigues 4 | Laugardalshöll, Reykjavík; Attendance: 0 Referees: Līcis, Sondors (LAT) |
| 10 January 2021; 16:00 | 2× (yellow card) 6× (suspension) 1× (red card) | Report | 4× (suspension) | Laugardalshöll, Reykjavík; Attendance: 0 Referees: Līcis, Sondors (LAT) |

| 14 March 2021; 16:00 | Lithuania | 31–28 | Israel | Avia Solutions Group Arena, Vilnius; Attendance: 0 Referees: Budzák, Záhradník (SVK) |
| 14 March 2021; 16:00 | Drabavičius, Plėta 6 | (11–10) | Sidi 12 | Avia Solutions Group Arena, Vilnius; Attendance: 0 Referees: Budzák, Záhradník (SVK) |
| 14 March 2021; 16:00 | 8× (suspension) | Report | 3× (yellow card) 6× (suspension) 1× (red card) | Avia Solutions Group Arena, Vilnius; Attendance: 0 Referees: Budzák, Záhradník (SVK) |

| 26 April 2021; 21:00 | Israel | 34–28 | Lithuania | Drive in Arena, Tel Aviv; Attendance: 700; Referees: Nikolić, Stojković (SRB) |
| 26 April 2021; 21:00 | Sidi 11 | (15–11) | Urbonas 8 | Drive in Arena, Tel Aviv; Attendance: 700; Referees: Nikolić, Stojković (SRB) |
| 26 April 2021; 21:00 | 3× (yellow card) 7× (suspension) 1× (red card) | Report | 4× (yellow card) 2× (suspension) | Drive in Arena, Tel Aviv; Attendance: 700; Referees: Nikolić, Stojković (SRB) |

| 27 April 2021; 20:30 | Israel | 20–30 | Iceland | Drive in Arena, Tel Aviv; Attendance: 500; Referees: Nikolić, Stojković (SRB) |
| 27 April 2021; 20:30 | three players 3 | (9–17) | three players 5 | Drive in Arena, Tel Aviv; Attendance: 500; Referees: Nikolić, Stojković (SRB) |
| 27 April 2021; 20:30 | 2× (yellow card) 1× (suspension) | Report | 2× (yellow card) 5× (suspension) | Drive in Arena, Tel Aviv; Attendance: 500; Referees: Nikolić, Stojković (SRB) |

| 29 April 2021; 19:00 | Lithuania | 29–27 | Iceland | Avia Solutions Group Arena, Vilnius; Attendance: 150; Referees: Nabokau, Kulik (BLR) |
| 29 April 2021; 19:00 | Malašinskas 12 | (13–9) | Pálmarsson 8 | Avia Solutions Group Arena, Vilnius; Attendance: 150; Referees: Nabokau, Kulik (BLR) |
| 29 April 2021; 19:00 | 1× (yellow card) 5× (suspension) | Report | 1× (yellow card) 4× (suspension) | Avia Solutions Group Arena, Vilnius; Attendance: 150; Referees: Nabokau, Kulik (BLR) |

| 29 April 2021; 20:00 | Israel | 29–41 | Portugal | Drive in Arena, Tel Aviv; Attendance: 600; Referees: Novikov, Rozhkov (UKR) |
| 29 April 2021; 20:00 | Sidi 6 | (13–22) | Branquinho 9 | Drive in Arena, Tel Aviv; Attendance: 600; Referees: Novikov, Rozhkov (UKR) |
| 29 April 2021; 20:00 | 3× (suspension) | Report | 1× (suspension) | Drive in Arena, Tel Aviv; Attendance: 600; Referees: Novikov, Rozhkov (UKR) |

| 2 May 2021; 16:00 | Iceland | 39–29 | Israel | Íþróttamiðstöð Hauka, Hafnarfjörður; Attendance: 0 Referees: Cipov, Klus (SVK) |
| 2 May 2021; 16:00 | Guðjónsson 7 | (21–14) | Cohen, Pomeranz 6 | Íþróttamiðstöð Hauka, Hafnarfjörður; Attendance: 0 Referees: Cipov, Klus (SVK) |
| 2 May 2021; 16:00 | 2× (yellow card) 5× (suspension) | Report | 2× (yellow card) 6× (suspension) | Íþróttamiðstöð Hauka, Hafnarfjörður; Attendance: 0 Referees: Cipov, Klus (SVK) |

| 2 May 2021; 17:00 | Portugal | 30–25 | Lithuania | Centro de Desportos e Congressos, Matosinhos; Attendance: 0 Referees: Rosendo, Rodríguez (ESP) |
| 2 May 2021; 17:00 | Areia 7 | (11–12) | Stankevičius 6 | Centro de Desportos e Congressos, Matosinhos; Attendance: 0 Referees: Rosendo, Rodríguez (ESP) |
| 2 May 2021; 17:00 | 5× (suspension) | Report | 2× (suspension) | Centro de Desportos e Congressos, Matosinhos; Attendance: 0 Referees: Rosendo, Rodríguez (ESP) |

=== Group 5 ===
| Pos | Team | Pld | W | D | L | GF | GA | GD | Pts | Qualification |
|---|---|---|---|---|---|---|---|---|---|---|
| 1 | Slovenia | 6 | 4 | 1 | 1 | 188 | 152 | +36 | 9 (Note: Slovenia 61–50 Netherlands) | Final tournament |
| 2 | Netherlands | 6 | 4 | 1 | 1 | 168 | 167 | +1 | 9 | Final tournament |
| 3 | Poland | 6 | 3 | 0 | 3 | 176 | 165 | +11 | 6 | Final tournament |
| 4 | Turkey | 6 | 0 | 0 | 6 | 144 | 192 | −48 | 0 | |

Source: EHF
Rules for classification: 1) points; 2) head-to-head points; 3) head-to-head goal difference; 4) head-to-head number of goals scored; 5) goal difference.
Notes:

| 4 November 2020; 20:00 | Netherlands | 27–26 | Turkey | Topsportcentrum, Almere; Attendance: 0 Referees: Kliko, Canbro (SWE) |
| 4 November 2020; 20:00 | K. Smits 9 | (10–14) | Çelebi 6 | Topsportcentrum, Almere; Attendance: 0 Referees: Kliko, Canbro (SWE) |
| 4 November 2020; 20:00 | 2× (yellow card) 5× (suspension) 1× (red card) | Report | 4× (suspension) | Topsportcentrum, Almere; Attendance: 0 Referees: Kliko, Canbro (SWE) |

| 6 January 2021; 18:15 | Netherlands | 23–34 | Slovenia | Topsportcentrum, Almere; Attendance: 0 Referees: Pálsson, Elíasson (ISL) |
| 6 January 2021; 18:15 | K. Smits 8 | (15–14) | Dolenec, Janc 7 | Topsportcentrum, Almere; Attendance: 0 Referees: Pálsson, Elíasson (ISL) |
| 6 January 2021; 18:15 | 1× (yellow card) 3× (suspension) | Report | 2× (yellow card) 5× (suspension) | Topsportcentrum, Almere; Attendance: 0 Referees: Pálsson, Elíasson (ISL) |

| 6 January 2021; 19:00 | Turkey | 24–29 | Poland | Porsuk Spor Salonu, Eskişehir; Attendance: 0 Referees: Stark, Ștefan (ROU) |
| 6 January 2021; 19:00 | Pehlivan 9 | (12–15) | T. Gębala, Moryto 6 | Porsuk Spor Salonu, Eskişehir; Attendance: 0 Referees: Stark, Ștefan (ROU) |
| 6 January 2021; 19:00 | 1× (yellow card) 5× (suspension) | Report | 6× (suspension) | Porsuk Spor Salonu, Eskişehir; Attendance: 0 Referees: Stark, Ștefan (ROU) |

| 9 January 2021; 20:00 | Poland | 35–24 | Turkey | Orlen Arena, Płock; Attendance: 0 Referees: Gatelis, Mažeika (LTU) |
| 9 January 2021; 20:00 | Moryto 7 | (16–12) | Pehlivan 5 | Orlen Arena, Płock; Attendance: 0 Referees: Gatelis, Mažeika (LTU) |
| 9 January 2021; 20:00 | 2× (yellow card) 4× (suspension) | Report | 3× (yellow card) 7× (suspension) 1× (red card) | Orlen Arena, Płock; Attendance: 0 Referees: Gatelis, Mažeika (LTU) |

| 10 January 2021; 20:00 | Slovenia | 27–27 | Netherlands | Zlatorog Arena, Celje; Attendance: 0 Referees: Mandák, Rudinský (SVK) |
| 10 January 2021; 20:00 | Gajić 7 | (15–13) | K. Smits 9 | Zlatorog Arena, Celje; Attendance: 0 Referees: Mandák, Rudinský (SVK) |
| 10 January 2021; 20:00 | 2× (yellow card) 3× (suspension) | Report | 3× (yellow card) 5× (suspension) | Zlatorog Arena, Celje; Attendance: 0 Referees: Mandák, Rudinský (SVK) |

| 9 March 2021; 20:10 | Slovenia | 32–29 | Poland | Zlatorog Arena, Celje; Attendance: 0 Referees: Brkic, Jusufhodzic (AUT) |
| 9 March 2021; 20:10 | Marguč 8 | (15–14) | Sićko 8 | Zlatorog Arena, Celje; Attendance: 0 Referees: Brkic, Jusufhodzic (AUT) |
| 9 March 2021; 20:10 | 2× (yellow card) 4× (suspension) 1× (red card) | Report | 1× (yellow card) 5× (suspension) 1× (red card) | Zlatorog Arena, Celje; Attendance: 0 Referees: Brkic, Jusufhodzic (AUT) |

| 14 March 2021; 18:15 | Poland | 26–27 | Netherlands | Hala Orbita, Wrocław; Attendance: 0 Referees: Baumgart, Wild (GER) |
| 14 March 2021; 18:15 | Daszek 6 | (11–11) | K. Smits 10 | Hala Orbita, Wrocław; Attendance: 0 Referees: Baumgart, Wild (GER) |
| 14 March 2021; 18:15 | 1× (yellow card) 4× (suspension) | Report | 2× (yellow card) 3× (suspension) | Hala Orbita, Wrocław; Attendance: 0 Referees: Baumgart, Wild (GER) |

| 27 April 2021; 19:00 | Turkey | 22–30 | Slovenia | Porsuk Spor Salonu, Eskişehir; Attendance: 70; Referees: Konjičanin, Konjičanin (BIH) |
| 27 April 2021; 19:00 | Biçer 7 | (11–16) | Dolenec 12 | Porsuk Spor Salonu, Eskişehir; Attendance: 70; Referees: Konjičanin, Konjičanin (BIH) |
| 27 April 2021; 19:00 | 3× (yellow card) 3× (suspension) 1× (red card) | Report | 1× (yellow card) 5× (suspension) | Porsuk Spor Salonu, Eskişehir; Attendance: 70; Referees: Konjičanin, Konjičanin (BIH) |

| 29 April 2021; 19:00 | Turkey | 24–32 | Netherlands | Porsuk Spor Salonu, Eskişehir; Attendance: 50; Referees: Cindrić, Gonzurek (CRO) |
| 29 April 2021; 19:00 | Biçer 5 | (12–15) | Smit 6 | Porsuk Spor Salonu, Eskişehir; Attendance: 50; Referees: Cindrić, Gonzurek (CRO) |
| 29 April 2021; 19:00 | 2× (yellow card) 1× (suspension) | Report | 2× (yellow card) 3× (suspension) | Porsuk Spor Salonu, Eskişehir; Attendance: 50; Referees: Cindrić, Gonzurek (CRO) |

| 29 April 2021; 20:00 | Poland | 27–26 | Slovenia | Stegu Arena, Opole; Attendance: 0 Referees: Baďura, Ondogrecula (SVK) |
| 29 April 2021; 20:00 | Moryto 7 | (12–10) | Novak 5 | Stegu Arena, Opole; Attendance: 0 Referees: Baďura, Ondogrecula (SVK) |
| 29 April 2021; 20:00 | 2× (yellow card) 4× (suspension) | Report | 2× (yellow card) 1× (suspension) | Stegu Arena, Opole; Attendance: 0 Referees: Baďura, Ondogrecula (SVK) |

| 2 May 2021; 18:00 | Slovenia | 39–24 | Turkey | Zlatorog Arena, Celje; Attendance: 0 Referees: Pirvu, Potirniche (ROU) |
| 2 May 2021; 18:00 | Mačkovšek, Marguč 6 | (19–11) | three players 4 | Zlatorog Arena, Celje; Attendance: 0 Referees: Pirvu, Potirniche (ROU) |
| 2 May 2021; 18:00 | 2× (yellow card) 3× (suspension) | Report | 3× (yellow card) 3× (suspension) | Zlatorog Arena, Celje; Attendance: 0 Referees: Pirvu, Potirniche (ROU) |

| 2 May 2021; 18:00 | Netherlands | 32–30 | Poland | Topsportcentrum, Almere; Attendance: 0 Referees: Marín, García (ESP) |
| 2 May 2021; 18:00 | K. Smits 8 | (17–16) | three players 6 | Topsportcentrum, Almere; Attendance: 0 Referees: Marín, García (ESP) |
| 2 May 2021; 18:00 | 3× (yellow card) 5× (suspension) | Report | 1× (yellow card) 5× (suspension) | Topsportcentrum, Almere; Attendance: 0 Referees: Marín, García (ESP) |

=== Group 6 ===
| Pos | Team | Pld | W | D | L | GF | GA | GD | Pts | Qualification |
|---|---|---|---|---|---|---|---|---|---|---|
| 1 | Norway | 6 | 5 | 0 | 1 | 192 | 132 | +60 | 10 (Note: Norway 52–52 Belarus) | Final tournament |
| 2 | Belarus | 6 | 5 | 0 | 1 | 190 | 168 | +22 | 10 | Final tournament |
| 3 | Italy | 6 | 1 | 0 | 5 | 160 | 193 | −33 | 2 (Note: Italy 57–48 Latvia) | |
| 4 | Latvia | 6 | 1 | 0 | 5 | 141 | 190 | −49 | 2 | |

Source: EHF
Rules for classification: 1) points; 2) head-to-head points; 3) head-to-head goal difference; 4) head-to-head number of goals scored; 5) goal difference.
Notes:

| 8 November 2020; 18:00 | Italy | 24–39 | Norway | Palasport Giovanni Paolo II, Pescara; Attendance: 0 Referees: Baďura, Ondogrecula (SVK) |
| 8 November 2020; 18:00 | Arcieri 4 | (7–17) | Gulliksen, Jøndal 7 | Palasport Giovanni Paolo II, Pescara; Attendance: 0 Referees: Baďura, Ondogrecula (SVK) |
| 8 November 2020; 18:00 | 1× (yellow card) 1× (suspension) | Report | 2× (yellow card) 1× (suspension) | Palasport Giovanni Paolo II, Pescara; Attendance: 0 Referees: Baďura, Ondogrecula (SVK) |

| 5 January 2021; 17:30 | Belarus | 33–25 | Norway | Minsk Sports Palace, Minsk; Attendance: 1,250; Referees: Leszczyński, Piechota (POL) |
| 5 January 2021; 17:30 | Kulesh 6 | (17–10) | Barthold 7 | Minsk Sports Palace, Minsk; Attendance: 1,250; Referees: Leszczyński, Piechota (POL) |
| 5 January 2021; 17:30 | 2× (yellow card) 4× (suspension) | Report | 2× (yellow card) 3× (suspension) | Minsk Sports Palace, Minsk; Attendance: 1,250; Referees: Leszczyński, Piechota (POL) |

| 7 January 2021; 20:30 | Italy | 28–17 | Latvia | Pala Santa Filomena, Chieti; Attendance: 0 Referees: Bounouara, Sami (FRA) |
| 7 January 2021; 20:30 | Bortoli, Parsini 6 | (13–8) | Kušners 5 | Pala Santa Filomena, Chieti; Attendance: 0 Referees: Bounouara, Sami (FRA) |
| 7 January 2021; 20:30 | 2× (yellow card) 3× (suspension) | Report | 2× (yellow card) 2× (suspension) | Pala Santa Filomena, Chieti; Attendance: 0 Referees: Bounouara, Sami (FRA) |

| 8 January 2021; 18:15 | Norway | 27–19 | Belarus | Nadderud Arena, Bekkestua; Attendance: 0 Referees: Mortensen, Kirkholm (DEN) |
| 8 January 2021; 18:15 | Barthold 9 | (11–10) | Pukhouski 9 | Nadderud Arena, Bekkestua; Attendance: 0 Referees: Mortensen, Kirkholm (DEN) |
| 8 January 2021; 18:15 | 1× (yellow card) 4× (suspension) | Report | 4× (suspension) 1× | Nadderud Arena, Bekkestua; Attendance: 0 Referees: Mortensen, Kirkholm (DEN) |

| 10 January 2021; 15:10 | Latvia | 31–29 | Italy | Vidzeme Olympic Center, Valmiera; Attendance: 0 Referees: Grigalionis, Šniurevičius (LTU) |
| 10 January 2021; 15:10 | Dude 8 | (17–14) | Bulzamini 9 | Vidzeme Olympic Center, Valmiera; Attendance: 0 Referees: Grigalionis, Šniurevičius (LTU) |
| 10 January 2021; 15:10 | 3× (suspension) | Report | 2× (yellow card) 2× (suspension) | Vidzeme Olympic Center, Valmiera; Attendance: 0 Referees: Grigalionis, Šniurevičius (LTU) |

| 10 March 2021; 18:00 | Belarus | 37–32 | Italy | Sport Palace Uruchje, Minsk; Attendance: 650; Referees: Covalciuc, Covalciuc (MDA) |
| 10 March 2021; 18:00 | Vailupau 11 | (18–14) | three players 5 | Sport Palace Uruchje, Minsk; Attendance: 650; Referees: Covalciuc, Covalciuc (MDA) |
| 10 March 2021; 18:00 | 2× (yellow card) 3× (suspension) | Report | 1× (yellow card) 1× (suspension) | Sport Palace Uruchje, Minsk; Attendance: 650; Referees: Covalciuc, Covalciuc (MDA) |

| 13 March 2021; 15:10 | Latvia | 27–39 | Belarus | Vidzemes Olympic Centre, Valmiera; Attendance: 0 Referees: Pandžić, Mošorinski (SRB) |
| 13 March 2021; 15:10 | Miķelsons 7 | (15–20) | Vailupau 14 | Vidzemes Olympic Centre, Valmiera; Attendance: 0 Referees: Pandžić, Mošorinski (SRB) |
| 13 March 2021; 15:10 | 3× (yellow card) 4× (suspension) | Report | 2× (yellow card) 3× (suspension) | Vidzemes Olympic Centre, Valmiera; Attendance: 0 Referees: Pandžić, Mošorinski (SRB) |

| 28 April 2021; 19:40 | Latvia | 23–28 | Norway | Vidzemes Olympic Centre, Valmiera; Attendance: 0 Referees: Jerlecki, Łabuń (POL) |
| 28 April 2021; 19:40 | Politers 6 | (13–14) | Sagosen 9 | Vidzemes Olympic Centre, Valmiera; Attendance: 0 Referees: Jerlecki, Łabuń (POL) |
| 28 April 2021; 19:40 | 2× (yellow card) 6× (suspension) | Report | 2× (yellow card) 2× (suspension) | Vidzemes Olympic Centre, Valmiera; Attendance: 0 Referees: Jerlecki, Łabuń (POL) |

| 29 April 2021; 19:00 | Italy | 31–32 | Belarus | Pala Santa Filomena, Chieti; Attendance: 0 Referees: Tzaferopoulos, Bethmann (GRE) |
| 29 April 2021; 19:00 | Kasa 7 | (16–16) | Bokhan, Vailupau 7 | Pala Santa Filomena, Chieti; Attendance: 0 Referees: Tzaferopoulos, Bethmann (GRE) |
| 29 April 2021; 19:00 | 3× (yellow card) | Report | 2× (suspension) | Pala Santa Filomena, Chieti; Attendance: 0 Referees: Tzaferopoulos, Bethmann (GRE) |

| 29 April 2021 (Note: The match, originally scheduled for the November 2020 and again for March 2021, was postponed and moved to away ground due to Norway's restricted COVID-19-regulations.); 19:15 | Norway | 36–17 | Latvia | Vidzemes Olympic Centre, Valmiera; Attendance: 0 Referees: Jerlecki, Łabuń (POL) |
| 29 April 2021; 19:15 | Gulliksen 11 | (17–11) | Kreicbergs 3 | Vidzemes Olympic Centre, Valmiera; Attendance: 0 Referees: Jerlecki, Łabuń (POL) |
| 29 April 2021; 19:15 | 1× (yellow card) 3× (suspension) | Report | 1× (yellow card) 3× (suspension) | Vidzemes Olympic Centre, Valmiera; Attendance: 0 Referees: Jerlecki, Łabuń (POL) |

| 2 May 2021; 19:00 | Belarus | 30–26 | Latvia | Čyžoŭka-Arena, Minsk; Attendance: 550; Referees: Erdoğan, Özdeniz (TUR) |
| 2 May 2021; 19:00 | Gayduchenko 6 | (10–13) | Borodovskis, Veršakovs 5 | Čyžoŭka-Arena, Minsk; Attendance: 550; Referees: Erdoğan, Özdeniz (TUR) |
| 2 May 2021; 19:00 | 2× (yellow card) 5× (suspension) | Report | 2× (yellow card) 2× (suspension) | Čyžoŭka-Arena, Minsk; Attendance: 550; Referees: Erdoğan, Özdeniz (TUR) |

| 2 May 2021; 19:00 | Norway | 37–16 | Italy | Vidzemes Olympic Centre, Valmiera, Latvia (Note: The match was moved to neutral ground due to Norway's restricted COVID-19-regulations.); Attendance: 0 Referees: Kull, Tint (EST) |
| 2 May 2021; 19:00 | Jøndal 8 | (23–9) | Kasa 3 | Vidzemes Olympic Centre, Valmiera, Latvia; Attendance: 0 Referees: Kull, Tint (EST) |
| 2 May 2021; 19:00 | 1× (yellow card) 3× (suspension) | Report | 2× (yellow card) 4× (suspension) | Vidzemes Olympic Centre, Valmiera, Latvia; Attendance: 0 Referees: Kull, Tint (EST) |

=== Group 7 ===
| Pos | Team | Pld | W | D | L | GF | GA | GD | Pts | Qualification |
|---|---|---|---|---|---|---|---|---|---|---|
| 1 | Denmark | 6 | 5 | 0 | 1 | 213 | 155 | +58 | 10 (Note: Denmark 66–54 North Macedonia) | Final tournament |
| 2 | North Macedonia | 6 | 5 | 0 | 1 | 168 | 163 | +5 | 10 | Final tournament |
| 3 | Switzerland | 6 | 2 | 0 | 4 | 170 | 164 | +6 | 4 | |
| 4 | Finland | 6 | 0 | 0 | 6 | 141 | 210 | −69 | 0 | |

Source: EHF
Rules for classification: 1) points; 2) head-to-head points; 3) head-to-head goal difference; 4) head-to-head number of goals scored; 5) goal difference.
Notes:

| 4 November 2020; 20:00 | North Macedonia | 33–24 | Finland | Boris Trajkovski Sports Center, Skopje; Attendance: 0 Referees: Pavliukov, Ershov (RUS) |
| 4 November 2020; 20:00 | Lazarov 11 | (16–10) | M. Granlund 10 | Boris Trajkovski Sports Center, Skopje; Attendance: 0 Referees: Pavliukov, Ershov (RUS) |
| 4 November 2020; 20:00 | 2× (yellow card) 3× (suspension) | Report | 2× (yellow card) 7× (suspension) | Boris Trajkovski Sports Center, Skopje; Attendance: 0 Referees: Pavliukov, Ershov (RUS) |

| 5 November 2020 (Note: The match, originally scheduled for 4 November 2020, was postponed due to an additional COVID-19 testing by the Swiss team, which were all negative.); 20:00 | Denmark | 31–26 | Switzerland | Ceres Park & Arena, Aarhus; Attendance: 344; Referees: Stark, Ștefan (ROU) |
| 5 November 2020; 20:00 | Lauge 9 | (14–8) | Schmid 10 | Ceres Park & Arena, Aarhus; Attendance: 344; Referees: Stark, Ștefan (ROU) |
| 5 November 2020; 20:00 | 2× (suspension) | Report | 1× (yellow card) 2× (suspension) | Ceres Park & Arena, Aarhus; Attendance: 344; Referees: Stark, Ștefan (ROU) |

| 7 November 2020; 16:00 | Finland | 22–40 | Denmark | Energia Areena, Vantaa; Attendance: 0 Referees: Barysas, Petrušis (LTU) |
| 7 November 2020; 16:00 | M. Granlund 7 | (11–19) | J. Hansen 11 | Energia Areena, Vantaa; Attendance: 0 Referees: Barysas, Petrušis (LTU) |
| 7 November 2020; 16:00 | 5× (suspension) | Report | 2× (suspension) | Energia Areena, Vantaa; Attendance: 0 Referees: Barysas, Petrušis (LTU) |

| 7 November 2020; 18:30 | Switzerland | 23–25 | North Macedonia | BBC Arena, Schaffhausen; Attendance: 50; Referees: Kurtagic, Wetterwik (SWE) |
| 7 November 2020; 18:30 | Schmid 6 | (10–10) | Lazarov 6 | BBC Arena, Schaffhausen; Attendance: 50; Referees: Kurtagic, Wetterwik (SWE) |
| 7 November 2020; 18:30 | 2× (yellow card) 4× (suspension) | Report | 1× (yellow card) 2× (suspension) | BBC Arena, Schaffhausen; Attendance: 50; Referees: Kurtagic, Wetterwik (SWE) |

| 11 March 2021; 18:00 | Finland | 19–32 | Switzerland | Energia Areena, Vantaa; Attendance: 0 Referees: Līcis, Sondors (LAT) |
| 11 March 2021; 18:00 | three players 3 | (8–15) | Milosevic 10 | Energia Areena, Vantaa; Attendance: 0 Referees: Līcis, Sondors (LAT) |
| 11 March 2021; 18:00 | 2× (yellow card) 2× (suspension) | Report | 2× (yellow card) 1× (suspension) | Energia Areena, Vantaa; Attendance: 0 Referees: Līcis, Sondors (LAT) |

| 11 March 2021; 20:00 | North Macedonia | 33–29 | Denmark | Boris Trajkovski Sports Center, Skopje; Attendance: 0 Referees: Nikolić, Stojković (SRB) |
| 11 March 2021; 20:00 | three players 5 | (17–13) | M. Hansen 11 | Boris Trajkovski Sports Center, Skopje; Attendance: 0 Referees: Nikolić, Stojković (SRB) |
| 11 March 2021; 20:00 | 1× (yellow card) 2× (suspension) | Report | 2× (yellow card) 3× (suspension) | Boris Trajkovski Sports Center, Skopje; Attendance: 0 Referees: Nikolić, Stojković (SRB) |

| 14 March 2021; 14:00 | Switzerland | 32–30 | Finland | BBC Arena, Schaffhausen; Attendance: 0 Referees: Martins, Martins (POR) |
| 14 March 2021; 14:00 | Schmid 14 | (18–16) | M. Granlund 10 | BBC Arena, Schaffhausen; Attendance: 0 Referees: Martins, Martins (POR) |
| 14 March 2021; 14:00 | 5× (suspension) | Report | 1× (yellow card) 7× (suspension) 1× (red card) | BBC Arena, Schaffhausen; Attendance: 0 Referees: Martins, Martins (POR) |

| 14 March 2021; 16:00 | Denmark | 37–21 | North Macedonia | Gigantium, Aalborg; Attendance: 0 Referees: Horváth, Marton (HUN) |
| 14 March 2021; 16:00 | Gidsel 7 | (17–10) | F. Kuzmanovski 5 | Gigantium, Aalborg; Attendance: 0 Referees: Horváth, Marton (HUN) |
| 14 March 2021; 16:00 | 2× (yellow card) 3× (suspension) | Report | 2× (yellow card) 5× (suspension) | Gigantium, Aalborg; Attendance: 0 Referees: Horváth, Marton (HUN) |

| 28 April 2021; 18:00 | Finland | 22–27 | North Macedonia | Cocks Areena, Riihimäki; Attendance: 0 Referees: Bounouara, Sami (FRA) |
| 28 April 2021; 18:00 | M. Granlund 6 | (14–12) | Kuzmanovski, Lazarov 5 | Cocks Areena, Riihimäki; Attendance: 0 Referees: Bounouara, Sami (FRA) |
| 28 April 2021; 18:00 | 2× (yellow card) 7× (suspension) | Report | 1× (yellow card) 3× (suspension) | Cocks Areena, Riihimäki; Attendance: 0 Referees: Bounouara, Sami (FRA) |

| 28 April 2021; 18:30 | Switzerland | 29–30 | Denmark | Axa Arena, Winterthur; Attendance: 50; Referees: Pichon, Reveret (FRA) |
| 28 April 2021; 18:30 | Schmid 12 | (17–14) | four players 4 | Axa Arena, Winterthur; Attendance: 50; Referees: Pichon, Reveret (FRA) |
| 28 April 2021; 18:30 | 2× (yellow card) 2× (suspension) | Report | 3× (yellow card) 6× (suspension) | Axa Arena, Winterthur; Attendance: 50; Referees: Pichon, Reveret (FRA) |

| 2 May 2021; 18:00 | Denmark | 46–24 | Finland | Ceres Park & Arena, Aarhus; Attendance: 0 Referees: Geraets, Geraets (NED) |
| 2 May 2021; 18:00 | Jakobsen 10 | (24–11) | M. Granlund 6 | Ceres Park & Arena, Aarhus; Attendance: 0 Referees: Geraets, Geraets (NED) |
| 2 May 2021; 18:00 | | Report | 1× (yellow card) 4× (suspension) | Ceres Park & Arena, Aarhus; Attendance: 0 Referees: Geraets, Geraets (NED) |

| 2 May 2021; 18:00 | North Macedonia | 29–28 | Switzerland | Boris Trajkovski Sports Center, Skopje; Attendance: 0 Referees: Lah, Sok (SLO) |
| 2 May 2021; 18:00 | Kuzmanovski, Lazarov 6 | (16–16) | Rubin 9 | Boris Trajkovski Sports Center, Skopje; Attendance: 0 Referees: Lah, Sok (SLO) |
| 2 May 2021; 18:00 | 1× (yellow card) 5× (suspension) | Report | 1× (yellow card) 4× (suspension) | Boris Trajkovski Sports Center, Skopje; Attendance: 0 Referees: Lah, Sok (SLO) |

=== Group 8 ===
| Pos | Team | Pld | W | D | L | GF | GA | GD | Pts | Qualification |
|---|---|---|---|---|---|---|---|---|---|---|
| 1 | Sweden | 6 | 6 | 0 | 0 | 194 | 131 | +63 | 12 | Final tournament |
| 2 | Montenegro | 6 | 3 | 0 | 3 | 155 | 163 | −8 | 6 | Final tournament |
| 3 | Kosovo | 6 | 1 | 1 | 4 | 132 | 176 | −44 | 3 (Note: Kosovo 53–48 Romania) | |
| 4 | Romania | 6 | 1 | 1 | 4 | 156 | 167 | −11 | 3 | |

Source: EHF
Rules for classification: 1) points; 2) head-to-head points; 3) head-to-head goal difference; 4) head-to-head number of goals scored; 5) goal difference.
Notes:

| 4 November 2020; 20:30 | Montenegro | 32–25 | Kosovo | Bemax Arena, Podgorica; Attendance: 0 Referees: Yovchev, Yonchev (BUL) |
| 4 November 2020; 20:30 | Grbović 9 | (16–14) | Terziqi 6 | Bemax Arena, Podgorica; Attendance: 0 Referees: Yovchev, Yonchev (BUL) |
| 4 November 2020; 20:30 | 2× (yellow card) 7× (suspension) | Report | 2× (yellow card) 2× (suspension) | Bemax Arena, Podgorica; Attendance: 0 Referees: Yovchev, Yonchev (BUL) |

| 5 November 2020; 18:10 | Sweden | 33–30 | Romania | Partille Arena, Partille; Attendance: 0 Referees: Caçador, Nicolau (POR) |
| 5 November 2020; 18:10 | Wanne 9 | (20–12) | Dumitru 6 | Partille Arena, Partille; Attendance: 0 Referees: Caçador, Nicolau (POR) |
| 5 November 2020; 18:10 | 2× (yellow card) 4× (suspension) | Report | 2× (yellow card) 6× (suspension) 1× (red card) | Partille Arena, Partille; Attendance: 0 Referees: Caçador, Nicolau (POR) |

| 8 November 2020; 17:00 | Kosovo | 16–30 | Sweden | Palace of Youth and Sports, Pristina; Attendance: 0 Referees: Nachevski, Bozhinovski (MKD) |
| 8 November 2020; 17:00 | Gjuka, Jupa 4 | (10–15) | Pellas 9 | Palace of Youth and Sports, Pristina; Attendance: 0 Referees: Nachevski, Bozhinovski (MKD) |
| 8 November 2020; 17:00 | 1× (yellow card) 3× (suspension) | Report | 3× (yellow card) 3× (suspension) | Palace of Youth and Sports, Pristina; Attendance: 0 Referees: Nachevski, Bozhinovski (MKD) |

| 8 November 2020; 18:25 | Romania | 36–27 | Montenegro | Lascăr Pană Sports Hall, Baia Mare; Attendance: 0 Referees: Horváth, Marton (HUN) |
| 8 November 2020; 18:25 | Bujor 8 | (16–13) | S. Vujović 6 | Lascăr Pană Sports Hall, Baia Mare; Attendance: 0 Referees: Horváth, Marton (HUN) |
| 8 November 2020; 18:25 | 2× (yellow card) 2× (suspension) | Report | 3× (yellow card) 3× (suspension) | Lascăr Pană Sports Hall, Baia Mare; Attendance: 0 Referees: Horváth, Marton (HUN) |

| 9 March 2021; 18:05 | Sweden | 27–24 | Montenegro | Sparbanken Skåne Arena, Lund; Attendance: 0 Referees: Mažeika, Gatelis (LTU) |
| 9 March 2021; 18:05 | Ekberg 8 | (15–13) | B. Vujović, M. Vujović 6 | Sparbanken Skåne Arena, Lund; Attendance: 0 Referees: Mažeika, Gatelis (LTU) |
| 9 March 2021; 18:05 | 1× (yellow card) 5× (suspension) | Report | 2× (yellow card) 9× (suspension) | Sparbanken Skåne Arena, Lund; Attendance: 0 Referees: Mažeika, Gatelis (LTU) |

| 10 March 2021; 19:30 | Kosovo | 23–23 | Romania | Palace of Youth and Sports, Pristina; Attendance: 0 Referees: Doychinov, Goretsov (BUL) |
| 10 March 2021; 19:30 | Terziqi 5 | (9–14) | Grigoraș, Negru 4 | Palace of Youth and Sports, Pristina; Attendance: 0 Referees: Doychinov, Goretsov (BUL) |
| 10 March 2021; 19:30 | 2× (yellow card) 2× (suspension) | Report | 1× (yellow card) 4× (suspension) | Palace of Youth and Sports, Pristina; Attendance: 0 Referees: Doychinov, Goretsov (BUL) |

| 14 March 2021; 18:00 | Romania | 25–30 | Kosovo | Polyvalent Hall, Bucharest; Attendance: 0 Referees: Jović, Arnautović (BIH) |
| 14 March 2021; 18:00 | Grigoraș 7 | (12–16) | Jupa 8 | Polyvalent Hall, Bucharest; Attendance: 0 Referees: Jović, Arnautović (BIH) |
| 14 March 2021; 18:00 | 1× (yellow card) 2× (suspension) 1× (red card) | Report | 1× (yellow card) 3× (suspension) | Polyvalent Hall, Bucharest; Attendance: 0 Referees: Jović, Arnautović (BIH) |

| 28 April 2021; 18:00 | Romania | 23–31 | Sweden | Sala Transilvania, Sibiu; Attendance: 0 Referees: Boričić, Marković (SRB) |
| 28 April 2021; 18:00 | Humet, Asoltanei 6 | (7–14) | Ekberg 8 | Sala Transilvania, Sibiu; Attendance: 0 Referees: Boričić, Marković (SRB) |
| 28 April 2021; 18:00 | 1× (yellow card) 2× (suspension) | Report | 2× (yellow card) 3× (suspension) | Sala Transilvania, Sibiu; Attendance: 0 Referees: Boričić, Marković (SRB) |

| 28 April 2021; 19:30 | Kosovo | 22–27 | Montenegro | Palace of Youth and Sports, Pristina; Attendance: 0 Referees: Brunner, Salah (SUI) |
| 28 April 2021; 19:30 | Tahirukaj 7 | (10–13) | Ševaljević 6 | Palace of Youth and Sports, Pristina; Attendance: 0 Referees: Brunner, Salah (SUI) |
| 28 April 2021; 19:30 | 1× (yellow card) 5× (suspension) | Report | 1× (yellow card) 3× (suspension) | Palace of Youth and Sports, Pristina; Attendance: 0 Referees: Brunner, Salah (SUI) |

| 30 April 2021; 18:00 | Montenegro | 22–34 | Sweden | Bemax Arena, Podgorica; Attendance: 0 Referees: Mandák, Rudinský (SVK) |
| 30 April 2021; 18:00 | Ševaljević 6 | (15–19) | Wanne 11 | Bemax Arena, Podgorica; Attendance: 0 Referees: Mandák, Rudinský (SVK) |
| 30 April 2021; 18:00 | 1× (yellow card) 2× (suspension) | Report | 1× (yellow card) 3× (suspension) | Bemax Arena, Podgorica; Attendance: 0 Referees: Mandák, Rudinský (SVK) |

| 2 May 2021; 18:00 | Sweden | 39–16 | Kosovo | Estrad Alingsås, Alingsås; Attendance: 0 Referees: Rauchs, Linster (LUX) |
| 2 May 2021; 18:00 | Ekberg 9 | (22–8) | Dedaj, Quni 4 | Estrad Alingsås, Alingsås; Attendance: 0 Referees: Rauchs, Linster (LUX) |
| 2 May 2021; 18:00 | 2× (yellow card) 2× (suspension) | Report | 2× (suspension) | Estrad Alingsås, Alingsås; Attendance: 0 Referees: Rauchs, Linster (LUX) |

| 2 May 2021; 18:00 | Montenegro | 23–19 | Romania | Bemax Arena, Podgorica; Attendance: 0 Referees: Brkic, Jusufhodzic (AUT) |
| 2 May 2021; 18:00 | Lasica, B. Vujović 5 | (9–9) | Humet 6 | Bemax Arena, Podgorica; Attendance: 0 Referees: Brkic, Jusufhodzic (AUT) |
| 2 May 2021; 18:00 | 2× (yellow card) 8× (suspension) 1× (red card) | Report | 2× (yellow card) 3× (suspension) | Bemax Arena, Podgorica; Attendance: 0 Referees: Brkic, Jusufhodzic (AUT) |

=== Ranking of third-placed teams ===
The four highest ranked third-placed teams from the groups directly qualified for the tournament. Matches against the fourth-placed teams in each group were discarded.

| Pos | Grp | Team | Pld | W | D | L | GF | GA | GD | Pts | Qualification |
|---|---|---|---|---|---|---|---|---|---|---|---|
| 1 | 2 | Bosnia and Herzegovina | 4 | 1 | 0 | 3 | 95 | 99 | −4 | 2 | Final tournament |
| 2 | 5 | Poland | 4 | 1 | 0 | 3 | 112 | 117 | −5 | 2 | Final tournament |
| 3 | 4 | Lithuania | 4 | 1 | 0 | 3 | 100 | 127 | −27 | 2 | Final tournament |
| 4 | 3 | Ukraine | 4 | 0 | 1 | 3 | 103 | 112 | −9 | 1 | Final tournament |
| 5 | 7 | Switzerland | 4 | 0 | 0 | 4 | 106 | 115 | −9 | 0 | |
| 6 | 1 | Greece | 4 | 0 | 0 | 4 | 107 | 144 | −37 | 0 | |
| 7 | 6 | Italy | 4 | 0 | 0 | 4 | 103 | 145 | −42 | 0 | |
| 8 | 8 | Kosovo | 4 | 0 | 0 | 4 | 79 | 128 | −49 | 0 | |

Source: EHF
Rules for classification: 1) points; 2) goal difference; 3) number of goals scored.

=== Ranking of fourth-placed teams ===
The four lowest ranked fourth-placed teams from the groups will play the Relegation round of the EURO 2024 qualification. Other teams will enter Qualifiers.

| Pos | Grp | Team | Pld | W | D | L | GF | GA | GD | Pts | Promotion or relegation |
|---|---|---|---|---|---|---|---|---|---|---|---|
| 1 | 8 | Romania | 6 | 1 | 1 | 4 | 156 | 167 | −11 | 3 | Qualifiers |
| 2 | 3 | Faroe Islands | 6 | 1 | 0 | 5 | 140 | 164 | −24 | 2 | Qualifiers |
| 3 | 2 | Estonia | 6 | 1 | 0 | 5 | 141 | 174 | −33 | 2 | Qualifiers |
| 4 | 4 | Israel | 6 | 1 | 0 | 5 | 162 | 200 | −38 | 2 | Qualifiers |
| 5 | 6 | Latvia | 6 | 1 | 0 | 5 | 141 | 190 | −49 | 2 | Relegation Round |
| 6 | 5 | Turkey | 6 | 0 | 0 | 6 | 144 | 192 | −48 | 0 | Relegation Round |
| 7 | 1 | Belgium | 6 | 0 | 0 | 6 | 0 | 60 | −60 | 0 | Relegation Round |
| 8 | 7 | Finland | 6 | 0 | 0 | 6 | 141 | 210 | −69 | 0 | Relegation Round |

Source: EHF
Rules for classification: 1) points; 2) goal difference; 3) number of goals scored.

== EHF Euro Cup ==
The EHF Euro Cup was played between the 2022 co-hosts, Hungary and Slovakia plus the top 2 from the 2020 Handball Euro, champions, Spain and second place, Croatia. The winner was Hungary.

| Pos | Team | Pld | W | D | L | GF | GA | GD | Pts |
|---|---|---|---|---|---|---|---|---|---|
| 1 | Hungary (C) | 6 | 5 | 0 | 1 | 181 | 151 | +30 | 10 |
| 2 | Croatia | 6 | 4 | 0 | 2 | 164 | 162 | +2 | 8 |
| 3 | Spain | 6 | 3 | 0 | 3 | 176 | 154 | +22 | 6 |
| 4 | Slovakia | 6 | 0 | 0 | 6 | 127 | 181 | −54 | 0 |

Source: EHF
Rules for classification: 1) points; 2) head-to-head points; 3) head-to-head goal difference; 4) head-to-head number of goals scored; 5) goal difference.
(C) Champions

| 4 November 2020; 18:15 | Hungary | 32–29 | Spain | Veszprém Aréna, Veszprém; Attendance: 1,000; Referees: Cindrić, Gonzurek (CRO) |
| 4 November 2020; 18:15 | Rosta 7 | (17–13) | Marchán 6 | Veszprém Aréna, Veszprém; Attendance: 1,000; Referees: Cindrić, Gonzurek (CRO) |
| 4 November 2020; 18:15 | 2× (yellow card) 4× (suspension) | Report | 1× (yellow card) 4× (suspension) | Veszprém Aréna, Veszprém; Attendance: 1,000; Referees: Cindrić, Gonzurek (CRO) |

| 7 November 2020; 18:00 | Croatia | 31–27 | Hungary | Gradski Arena, Osijek; Attendance: 0 Referees: Pandžić, Mošorinski (SRB) |
| 7 November 2020; 18:00 | Martinović, Štrlek 6 | (17–13) | Bodó 6 | Gradski Arena, Osijek; Attendance: 0 Referees: Pandžić, Mošorinski (SRB) |
| 7 November 2020; 18:00 | 2× (yellow card) 2× (suspension) | Report | 2× (yellow card) 3× (suspension) | Gradski Arena, Osijek; Attendance: 0 Referees: Pandžić, Mošorinski (SRB) |

| 5 January 2021; 17:15 | Croatia | 31–28 | Spain | Žatika Sport Centre, Poreč; Attendance: 0 Referees: Brkic, Jusufhodzic (AUT) |
| 5 January 2021; 17:15 | Cindrić, Mandić 5 | (17–14) | A. Dujshebaev 6 | Žatika Sport Centre, Poreč; Attendance: 0 Referees: Brkic, Jusufhodzic (AUT) |
| 5 January 2021; 17:15 | 1× (yellow card) 5× (suspension) | Report | 1× (yellow card) 1× (suspension) | Žatika Sport Centre, Poreč; Attendance: 0 Referees: Brkic, Jusufhodzic (AUT) |

| 10 March 2021; 18:00 | Slovakia | 18–30 | Spain | Ondrej Nepela Arena, Bratislava; Attendance: 0 Referees: Lončar, Lončar (CRO) |
| 10 March 2021; 18:00 | Recicar 4 | (8–16) | Solé 9 | Ondrej Nepela Arena, Bratislava; Attendance: 0 Referees: Lončar, Lončar (CRO) |
| 10 March 2021; 18:00 | 1× (yellow card) 3× (suspension) | Report | 1× (suspension) | Ondrej Nepela Arena, Bratislava; Attendance: 0 Referees: Lončar, Lončar (CRO) |

| 12 March 2021; 19:00 | Slovakia | 15–30 | Hungary | Ondrej Nepela Arena, Bratislava; Attendance: 0 Referees: Bolic, Hurich (AUT) |
| 12 March 2021; 19:00 | Hruščák 5 | (8–17) | Máthé 10 | Ondrej Nepela Arena, Bratislava; Attendance: 0 Referees: Bolic, Hurich (AUT) |
| 12 March 2021; 19:00 | 1× (yellow card) 5× (suspension) | Report | 1× (yellow card) 2× (suspension) | Ondrej Nepela Arena, Bratislava; Attendance: 0 Referees: Bolic, Hurich (AUT) |

| 14 March 2021; 15:00 | Hungary | 36–26 | Slovakia | Audi Aréna, Győr; Attendance: 0 Referees: Backović, Palačković (SLO) |
| 14 March 2021; 15:00 | Máthé 7 | (19–15) | Hruščák 9 | Audi Aréna, Győr; Attendance: 0 Referees: Backović, Palačković (SLO) |
| 14 March 2021; 15:00 | 2× (yellow card) 3× (suspension) | Report | 1× (yellow card) 4× (suspension) | Audi Aréna, Győr; Attendance: 0 Referees: Backović, Palačković (SLO) |

| 28 April 2021; 19:00 | Slovakia | 24–32 | Croatia | Varaždin Arena, Varaždin; Attendance: 0 Referees: Bozhinovski, Nachevski (MKD) |
| 28 April 2021; 19:00 | Urban 6 | (10–16) | Mihić, Mandić 5 | Varaždin Arena, Varaždin; Attendance: 0 Referees: Bozhinovski, Nachevski (MKD) |
| 28 April 2021; 19:00 | 2× (yellow card) 2× (suspension) | Report | 2× (yellow card) 1× (suspension) | Varaždin Arena, Varaždin; Attendance: 0 Referees: Bozhinovski, Nachevski (MKD) |

| 28 April 2021; 20:30 | Spain | 28–30 | Hungary | Pabellón Polideportivo Municipal Fernando Argüelles, Málaga; Attendance: 0 Referees: Bonaventura, Bonaventura (FRA) |
| 28 April 2021; 20:30 | Figueras 8 | (15–14) | Bánhidi 8 | Pabellón Polideportivo Municipal Fernando Argüelles, Málaga; Attendance: 0 Referees: Bonaventura, Bonaventura (FRA) |
| 28 April 2021; 20:30 | 3× (suspension) | Report | 1× (yellow card) 5× (suspension) | Pabellón Polideportivo Municipal Fernando Argüelles, Málaga; Attendance: 0 Referees: Bonaventura, Bonaventura (FRA) |

| 29 April 2021; 18:00 | Croatia | 26–23 | Slovakia | Varaždin Arena, Varaždin; Attendance: 0 Referees: Bozhinovski, Nachevski (MKD) |
| 29 April 2021; 18:00 | Lučin, Pavlovic 5 | (12–13) | Hruščák 7 | Varaždin Arena, Varaždin; Attendance: 0 Referees: Bozhinovski, Nachevski (MKD) |
| 29 April 2021; 18:00 | 2× (yellow card) 2× (suspension) | Report | 1× (yellow card) 3× (suspension) | Varaždin Arena, Varaždin; Attendance: 0 Referees: Bozhinovski, Nachevski (MKD) |

| 1 May 2021; 14:10 | Hungary | 26–22 | Croatia | Veszprém Aréna, Veszprém; Attendance: 0 Referees: Baumgart, Wild (GER) |
| 1 May 2021; 14:10 | Máthé 6 | (9–10) | Čupić 5 | Veszprém Aréna, Veszprém; Attendance: 0 Referees: Baumgart, Wild (GER) |
| 1 May 2021; 14:10 | 1× (yellow card) 4× (suspension) | Report | 2× (yellow card) 6× (suspension) | Veszprém Aréna, Veszprém; Attendance: 0 Referees: Baumgart, Wild (GER) |

| 1 May 2021; 21:00 | Spain | 27–21 | Slovakia | Poliesportiu Pla de L'Arc, Llíria; Referees: Freitas, Carvalho (POR) |
| 1 May 2021; 21:00 | Rivera Folch, Guardiola 5 | (13–10) | Kalafut 7 | Poliesportiu Pla de L'Arc, Llíria; Referees: Freitas, Carvalho (POR) |
| 1 May 2021; 21:00 | 1× (yellow card) 1× (suspension) | Report | 1× (yellow card) 3× (suspension) | Poliesportiu Pla de L'Arc, Llíria; Referees: Freitas, Carvalho (POR) |

| 27 June 2021; 20:00 | Spain | 34–22 | Croatia | Pavillón Municipal dos Deportes de Pontevedra, Pontevedra; Attendance: 500; Referees: Santos, Fonseca (POR) |
| 27 June 2021; 20:00 | three players 6 | (15–13) | Severec 4 | Pavillón Municipal dos Deportes de Pontevedra, Pontevedra; Attendance: 500; Referees: Santos, Fonseca (POR) |
| 27 June 2021; 20:00 | 2× (suspension) | Report | 2× (yellow card) 6× (suspension) | Pavillón Municipal dos Deportes de Pontevedra, Pontevedra; Attendance: 500; Referees: Santos, Fonseca (POR) |
