= Arājs =

Family name

Origin
- Origin: Latvian
- Meaning: "ploughman"

Other names
- Variant form: Arajs/Araja

Arājs (feminine: Arāja) is a Latvian occupational surname, derived from the Latvian word for "ploughman". Individuals with the surname include:

- Ronalds Arājs (born 1987), Latvian athlete
- Oskars Arājs (born 1990), Latvian handball player
- Viktors Arājs (1910–1988), Latvian collaborator and Nazi SS officer
