= ZRHK Tenax Dobele =

Latvian handball club

- Full name: Zemgales Regionalais HandbolaKlubs Tenax Dobele
- Short name: Tenax Dobele
- Founded: 1996; 30 years ago
- Arena: Sports Centre Dobele
- President: Ivars Zariņš
- Head coach: Sandris Versakovs
- League: SynotTip Virslīgā, Baltic Handball League
- Club colours
Home	Away

ZRHK Tenax Dobele is a Latvian professional handball team from Dobele. They compete in SynotTip Virslīgā and Baltic Handball League.

Location of Tenax Dobele

== History ==
The club was founded in 1996. During its history, it won 9 national championships (1999, 2014, 2015, 2016, 2018, 2019, 2021, 2022, 2023).

== Crest, colours, supporters ==
=== Kits ===
HOME

2019–21

AWAY
2016–17	2019–21

== Team ==
=== Current squad ===
Squad for the 2023–24 season

ZRHK Tenax Dobele

Goalkeepers

- 12 (Latvia) Martins Ozolinš
- 82 (Latvia) Ritvars Putra
- 92 (Latvia) Artūrs Kuģis

Left Wingers

- 8 (Latvia) Kristers Suharevs
- 10 (Latvia) Kristians Pavlenko
- 21 (Latvia) Ricards Juzups
- 44 (Latvia) Oskars Arājs

Right Wingers

- 2 (Latvia) Nikita Pancenko
- 3 (Latvia) Kristers Plume
- 13 (Latvia) Linards Usans
- 18 (Latvia) Andis Ērmanis

Line Players

- 4 (Latvia) Aleksis Smokro
- 14 (Latvia) Antons Šuleiko
- 15 (Latvia) Andris Vidovskis
- 27 (Latvia) Kevins Plaunovs
- 35 (Latvia) Egils Politers

Central Backs

- 7 (Latvia) Karlis Krumins
- 9 (Latvia) Nils-Aivis Mikelsons
- 24 (Latvia) Oskars Bisenieks
- 86 (Latvia) Māris Veršakovs

Left Backs

- 17 (Latvia) Nils Kreicbergs
- 22 (Latvia) Rudolfs Elferts
- 98 (Latvia) Emils Kurzemnieks

Right Backs

- 5 (Latvia) Guntis Pilpuks

=== Technical staff ===
- Head Coach: (Latvia) Sandris Versakovs
- Coach: (Latvia) Agate Adina
- Physiotherapist: (Latvia) Karina Dzilna

=== Transfers ===
Transfers for the 2023–24 season

Joining

- (Latvia) Māris Veršakovs (CB) from (Italy) SSV Brixen Handball
- (Latvia) Guntis Pilpuks (RB) from (Iceland) Hörður

Leaving

== Accomplishments ==
- Baltic Handball League:
  - Bronze (1): 2023
- SynotTip Virslīgā:
  - Gold (9): 1999, 2014, 2015, 2016, 2018, 2019, 2021, 2022, 2023
  - Silver (1): 2017

== EHF ranking ==
As of 27/04/2026

Rank	Team	Points
119	(France) Pays d'Aix UC	38
120	(Bosnia and Herzegovina) RK Konjuh	37
121	(Sweden) Alingsås HK	36
122	(Latvia) ZRHK Tenax Dobele	36
123	(Bosnia and Herzegovina) RK Vogošća	35
124	(Romania) CSM București	35
125	(Italy) Junior Fasano	35

== Former club members ==
=== Notable former players ===
- (Latvia) Oskars Arājs (2012-)
- (Latvia) Andis Ērmanis (2018-)
- (Latvia) Aivis Jurdžs (2019–2020)
- (Latvia) Arvis Juzups (2011–2015, 2018)
- (Latvia) Nils Kreicbergs (2014–2016, 2018–2019, 2021-)
- (Latvia) Artūrs Kuģis (2010–2011, 2022-)
- (Latvia) Uldis Lībergs (2021–2022)
- (Latvia) Egils Politers (2018-)
- (Latvia) Raimonds Šteins (2016–2020)
- (Latvia) Austris Tuminskis (2018, 2021–2022)
- (Latvia) Māris Veršakovs (2019–2021, 2023-)
