= Diego Modrušan =

Croatian handball player (born 1980)

Personal information
- Born: 2 September 1980 (age 46) Pula, SR Croatia, SFR Yugoslavia
- Height: 1.97 m (6 ft 6 in)

Sport
- Sport: Handball
- Position: Goalkeeper

Senior clubs
- Years: Team
- 2000–2002: PPD Zagreb
- 2002–2003: Pallamano Trieste
- 2004: Ascoli
- 2004–2007: Pallamano Trieste
- 2007–2008: Casarano
- 2008–2009: Prato
- 2009: Emmeti
- 2009–2012: Pallamano Trieste
- 2012–2014: Umag
- 2014-2016: Novigrad
- 2016–2020: Pallamano Trieste
- 2022-2025: Umag
National team
- Years: Team
- –: Croatia
Medal record
Men's handball
Representing Croatia
Mediterranean Games
Gold medal – first place	2001 Tunis	Team

Diego Modrušan (born 2 September 1980) is a former Croatian professional handball player. He won two Croatian Championships with Zagreb and the Italian Serie A with Handball Casarano. Modrušan play as a goalkeeper.

== Career ==
He started playing handball at age thirteen. In 2000 he signed with RK Zagreb, where he won two consecutive titles and made his debut in the EHF Champions League. In 2002 he moved to Pallamano Trieste. In the second part of the 2003–2004 season he passed on loan to Ascoli, with which he managed to avoid relegation. On his return to Trieste he won the only Handball Trophy in the history of the club, and reached the finale Scudetto (finals). In 2007 came the call of Italian champion Casarano, which made another important acquisition with Modrušan after Vito Fovio the year before. Modrušan won the Italian 2007/2008 Serie A with Casarano, as well as the Italian cup.

In the following season, he moved to Prato. Modrušan didn't end the season with Prato, because during the same season he moved to Emmeti. At the beginning of the 2009–2010 season he returned to Trieste and stayed there for three seasons. In 2012 he returned to Croatia after ten years, joining Umag. In 2016 he returned for the third and last time to Trieste.

He was in the Croatian national team that won the 2001 Mediterranean Games in Tunis. In 2008 he was called up by the Italian university team to compete in the world championship held in Oderzo and Meolo.
