= SSV Brixen Handball =

Italian handball club

- Full name: Südtiroler Sportverein Brixen Handball
- Short name: SSV Brixen
- Founded: 1970; 55 years ago
- Arena: Brixen Fischzucht Halle
- Head coach: Davor Čutura
- League: Serie A Gold
- Club colours

SSV Brixen Handball is an Italian handball club from Bressanone, that plays in the Serie A Gold.

Location of SSV Brixen Handball

== History ==
The handball section of the Bressanone sports club was founded in 1970. During its history, it won 2 national championships (1992, 1993), 3 Italian Cups (1982, 1988, 2003).

== Crest, colours, supporters ==
=== Kits ===
HOME

2011–13

AWAY

2011–13

== Team ==
=== Current squad ===
Squad for the 2024–25 season

SSV Brixen Handball

Goalkeepers

- 31 (Ukraine) Maksym Voliuvach
- 96 (Italy) Alessandro Lubinati

Left Wingers

- 2 (Italy) Daniel Azzolin
- 10 (Italy) Stefano Arcieri

Right Wingers

- 3 (Argentina) Tomás Della Vecchia
- 34 (Italy) Felix Mühlögger

Line Players

- 18 (Italy) Endrit Iballi
- 29 (Italy) Andrea Bašić
- 36 (Italy) Adam Puntaier

Left Backs

- 6 (Brazil) Paulo Vinícius Oliveira Cândido
- 14 (Argentina) Tomás Cañete
- 30 (Italy) Jonah Fliri

Central Backs

- 19 (Italy) Ardian Iballi

Right Backs

- 47 (Italy) Axel Rufinatscha
- 59 (Italy) Daniel Oberhollenzer

=== Technical staff ===
- Head coach: (Serbia) Davor Čutura
- Assistant coach: (Italy) Rudolf Neuner
- Fitness coach: (Italy) Franco Cubich

=== Transfers ===
Transfers for the 2025–26 season

Joining

Leaving

- (Argentina) Tomás Cañete (LB) to (Greece) Olympiacos

=== Transfer History ===
Transfers for the 2023–24 season

Joining

- (Slovakia) Marek Korbel (RB) from (Czech Republic) Talent Plzeň
- (Brazil) Paulo Vinícius Oliveira Cândido (LB) from (Spain) BB Oviedo
- (Argentina) Tomás Cañete (LB) from (Italy) Handball Club Fondi
- (Argentina) Federico Vanoli (CB) from (Italy) Handball Club Fondi
- (Italy) Gabriele Sontacchi (LP) from (Italy) Pallamano Pressano

Leaving

- (Italy) Davide Bulzamini (LB) to (Slovenia) RK Trimo Trebnje
- (Italy) Gianluca Dapiran (LW) to (Italy) Pallamano Trieste 1970
- (Latvia) Māris Veršakovs (CB) to (Latvia) ZRHK Tenax Dobele
- (Ukraine) Stanislav Kholodiuk (RB) to (Estonia) Põlva Serviti

== Titles ==
- Serie A Gold
  - Winner (2) : 1991, 1992
- Italian Cup
  - Winner (3) : 1982, 1988, 2003

== EHF ranking ==
As of 12/10/2023

Rank	Team	Points
99	(Russia) HBC CSKA Moscow	46
100	(Luxembourg) Red Boys Differdange	46
101	(Greece) Olympiacos	45
102	(Italy) SSV Brixen Handball	45
103	(Belarus) SKA Minsk	44
104	(Austria) Bregenz Handball	44
105	(Germany) MT Melsungen	44

== Former club members ==
=== Notable former players ===
- (Italy) Stefano Arcieri (2021–)
- (Italy) (Croatia) Andrea Bašić (2017–2022)
- (Italy) (Croatia) Bruno Brzić (2017–2018)
- (Italy) Davide Bulzamini (2022–2023)
- (Italy) Gianluca Dapiran (2021–2023)
- (Italy) Michael Niederwieser (1982–2002)
- (Italy) Jürgen Prantner (1997–1999)
- (Italy) Martin Sonnerer (2009–2016, 2022–)
- (Bosnia and Herzegovina) Nenad Milosevic (1997–2000)
- (Croatia) Miro Barišić (2003–2004)
- (France) Denis Lathoud (2000–2001)
- (Hungary) István Székely (2002–2004)
- (South Korea) Yoon Kyung-min (2006–2007)
- (Latvia) Māris Veršakovs (2022–2023)
- (Romania) Petru Pop (2004–2005)
- (Slovenia) Mirko Nikolič-Kajič (2011–2013)
- (Serbia) Davor Čutura (2019–2022)
- (Hungary) Mihály Kovács (handballer) (1987–1993, 2004–2007)
