= Branko Štrbac =

Serbian handball player (born 1957)

Štrbac Branko
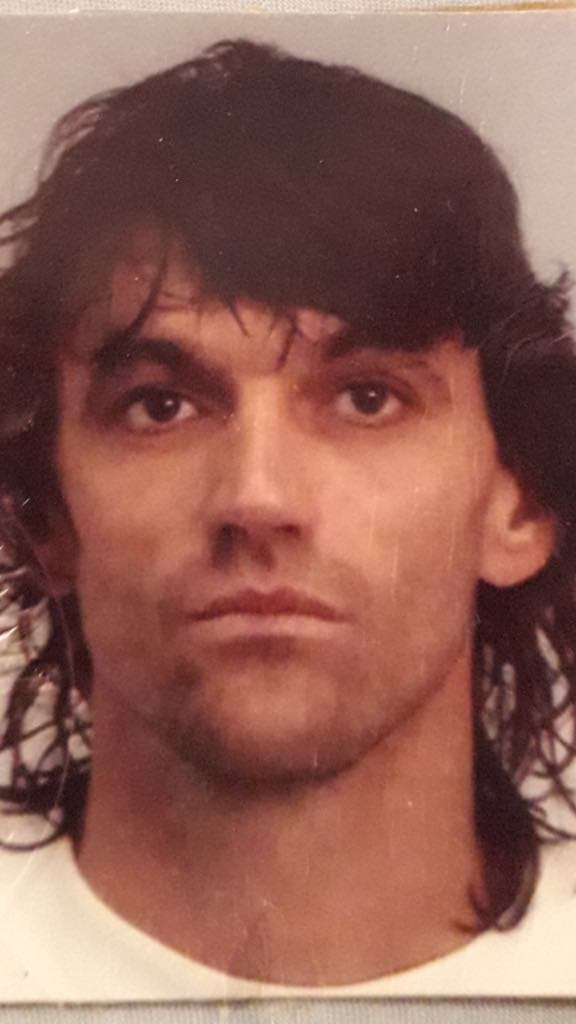

Personal information
- Nationality: Serbian
- Born: 25 July 1957 (age 69) Herceg Novi, FPR Yugoslavia
- Height: 1.88 m (6 ft 2 in)

Sport
- Sport: Handball
- Position: Right back

Senior clubs
- Years: Team
- 1973–1977: RK Mladost Zemun
- 1977–1982: RK Borac Banja Luka
- 1982–1987: RK Crvena zvezda
- 1987–1988: USAM Nîmes Gard
- 1988–1991: Cividin Trieste
- 1991–1992: ZMC Amicitia
- 1992–1996: TV Suhr Aarau
National team
- Years: Team
- 1978–1984: Yugoslavia
Medal record
Olympic Games
Gold medal – first place	1984 Los Angeles	Team
World Championship
Silver medal – second place	1982 West Germany

Branko Štrbac (Serbian Cyrillic: Бранко Штрбац, born 25 July 1957) is a former Serbian handball player. In 1984 he was a member of the Yugoslav handball team which won the gold medal at the Olympics. In 1982 he was part of the Yugoslav team which won the silver medal in Dortmund, Germany. He won three championships (Yugoslav team season 1979/80; French team, USAM Nîmes Gard season 1987/88; Italian team, Cividin Trieste season 1990/91) including Yugoslavian cup by playing for RK Borac Banja Luka, season 1980/81.
