= Pallamano Trieste 1970 =

Italian handball club

- Short name: Trieste
- Founded: 1970; 56 years ago
- Arena: PalaChiarbola
- Capacity: 1.100
- President: Federico Lanza
- Head coach: Boris Lisica
- League: Serie A Gold
- 2025-26: 7th
- Club colours
| Home | Away |

Pallamano Trieste 1970 is an Italian handball club from Trieste, that plays in the Serie A Gold. It is the most titled team in the history of Italian handball, with 17 "Scudetti", 6 Italian cups and 1 league cup.

== History ==
The club was founded in 1970 and after six years won his first championship. From 1993 to 1997 won five consecutive championships, a record that is still unbeaten in Italy.

It participated in sixteen editions of the EHF Champions League and reached the semifinals of the EHF Challenge Cup in 2004, when it was eliminated by the Swedish team IFK Skövde.

In 2024 relegated for the first time in its history to the second league, but the following season it won the championship and was immediately promoted to the first division.

=== Naming conventions ===
- 1970-1973 US Acli Trieste
- 1973-1977 Duina Trieste
- 1977-1991 Cividin Trieste
- 1991-1992 Pallamano Trieste
- 1992-1997 Principe Trieste
- 1997-2000 Genertel Trieste
- 2000-2004 Coop Essepiù Trieste
- 2004-2016 Pallamano Trieste
- 2016-2018 Principe Trieste
- 2018-2024 Pallamano Trieste
- 2024- Pallamano Trieste 1970

== Titles ==
- Serie A Gold
  - Winner (17) : 1976, 1977, 1979, 1981, 1982, 1983, 1985, 1986, 1990, 1993, 1994, 1995, 1996, 1997, 2000, 2001, 2002
- Italian Cup
  - Winner (6) : 1987, 1993, 1995, 1999, 2001, 2002
- League Cup
  - Winner (1) : 2005

== Team ==
=== Current squad ===
Squad for the 2025–26 season

Pallamano Trieste 1970

Goalkeepers

- 1 (Argentina) Facundo García
- 16 (Italy) Thomas Postogna
- 21 (Italy) Orfeo Giorgi

Left Wingers

- 10 (Italy) Federico Urbaz
- 14 (Italy) Davide Parisato

Right Wingers

- 7 (Italy) Gabriel Mazzarol
- 15 (Italy) Pietro Lo Duca
- 18 (Argentina) Juan Pauloni

Line Players

- 6 (Italy) Pietro Del Frari
- 9 (Italy) Alex Pernic (c)
- 17 (Italy) Leo Andreotta
- 25 (Algeria) Sofiane Bendjilali

Left Backs

- 4 (Argentina) Fernando Bono
- 8 (Italy) Samuele Antonutti
- 97 (France) Clément Esparon

Central Backs

- 5 (Italy) Lorenzo Ganz
- 11 (Spain) Jaume Pujol
- 22 (Argentina) Federico Vanoli
- 23 (France) Lucas Hubert

Right Backs

- 19 (Sweden) Richard Lindström
- 33 (Italy) Luca Sandrin

=== Technical staff ===
- Head coach: (Croatia) Boris Lisica
- Assistant coach: (Italy) Piero Sivini
- Fitness coach: (Italy) Francesco Tremul

=== Transfers ===
Transfers for the 2026–27 season

Joining

- (Argentina) Juan Bautista Ceccardi (CB) from (Italy) SSV Brixen Handball

Leaving

- (Sweden) Richard Lindström (RB) to (Sweden) Amo Handboll
- (France) Clément Esparon (LB) to (Spain) CB Nava
- (Spain) Jaume Pujol (CB) to (Italy) Conversano
- (Algeria) Sofiane Bendjilali (LP) to ?
- (Italy) Alex Pernic (LP) retires

=== Transfer History ===
Transfers for the 2025–26 season

Joining

- (France) Clément Esparon (LB) from (France) Sarrebourg Moselle-Sud HB

Leaving

== Notable european games ==
| Season | Competition | Round | Club | 1st leg | 2nd leg | Aggregate |
|---|---|---|---|---|---|---|
| 1997–98 | Champions League | GS | (Croatia) Badel 1862 Zagreb | 27–25 | | |
| 2000–01 | Champions League | GS | (Germany) THW Kiel | 28-28 | | |
| 2002–03 | Champions League | GS | (Denmark) KIF Kolding | 32–31 | | |
| 2003–04 | Challenge Cup | 1/32 | (Portugal) Desp. Francisco de Holanda | 33–21 | 23–28 | 56-49 |
| 2003–04 | Challenge Cup | 1/16 | (Greece) A.S.E. Doukas | 26–24 | 32–26 | 58-50 |
| 2003–04 | Challenge Cup | 1/8 | (Serbia) RK Crvena zvezda | 29–26 | 38–30 | 67-56 |
| 2003–04 | Challenge Cup | 1/4 | (Denmark) AG København | 29–21 | 28–33 | 57-54 |
| 2003–04 | Challenge Cup | 1/2 | (Sweden) IFK Skövde | 33–30 | 27–37 | 60-67 |

== Notable former players ==
- (Socialist Federal Republic of Yugoslavia) Zdravko Miljak
- (Socialist Federal Republic of Yugoslavia) Branko Štrbac
- (Croatia) Silvio Ivandija
- (Croatia) Vladimir Jelčić
- (Serbia and Montenegro) Slobodan Kuzmanovski
- (Croatia) Dalibor Anušić
- (Serbia and Montenegro) Goran Đukanović
- (Slovenia) Rok Ivančič
- (Montenegro) Božidar Leković
- (Croatia) (Italy) Diego Modrušan
- (Croatia) (Italy) Tin Tokić
- (Croatia) (Italy) Michele Skatar
- (Italy) Marco Bozzola
- (Italy) Piero Sivini
- (Italy) Claudio Schina
- (Italy) Giorgio Oveglia
- (Italy) Alessandro Tarafino
