= Andis Ērmanis =

Latvian handball player (born 1990)

Personal information
- Nationality: Latvian
- Born: 21 May 1990 (age 36) Dobele, Latvia
- Height: 1.68 m (5 ft 6 in)

Sport
- Sport: Handball
- Position: Right wing
- Current club: ZRHK Tenax Dobele
- Number: 18
National team
Years	Team	Apps	(Gls)
–	Latvia	54	(19)

Andis Ērmanis (born 21 May 1990) is a Latvian handball player for ZRHK Tenax Dobele and the Latvian national team.

He represented Latvia at the 2020 European Men's Handball Championship. This was Latvias first ever appearance at a major international tournament. They finished 24th out of 24 teams.
