= Sport Club Meran Handball =

Italian handball club

Handball Meran
- Full name: Handball Meran Alperia Black Devils
- Nickname: Black Devils
- Short name: SCM
- Founded: 1973; 53 years ago
- Arena: Black Devils Arena
- Capacity: 500
- President: Denis Pellegrini
- Head coach: Emanuele Panetti
- League: Serie A Gold
- Club colours

Handball Meran Alperia Black Devils is an Italian handball club from Merano, that plays in the Serie A Gold.

Location of Handball Meran

== History ==
The club was founded in 1973. Its seat is located in the city of Merano, in the province of Bolzano. He currently plays in Serie A Gold, the top Italian national men's handball league. During its history, it won 1 national championship (in 2005), 1 Italian Cup (in 2004) and 1 Italian Super Cup (in 2005).

== Team ==
=== Current squad ===
Squad for the 2024–25 season

Handball Meran

Goalkeepers

- 16 (Italy) Andrea Colleluori
- 22 (Tunisia) Selmi Haj Frej

Left Wingers

- 9 (Italy) Luca Visentin
- 14 (Argentina) Tobías Wolf
- 19 (Italy) Paul Raffeiner

Right Wingers

- 18 (Italy) Paul Wierer
- 23 (Argentina) Santiago Núñez

Line Players

- 7 (Italy) Tommaso Romei
- 11 (Italy) Andreas Stricker
- 21 (Italy) Oliver Martini

Left Backs

- 13 (Italy) Ratko Starčević
- 27 (Serbia) Danilo Milović
- 46 (Italy) Luca Sperandio

Central Backs

- 3 (Italy) Nicola Fadanelli
- 10 (Italy) Samuel Gerstgrasser

Right Backs

- 66 (Italy) Max Prantner

=== Technical staff ===
- Head coach: (Italy) Jürgen Prantner
- Assistant coach: (Italy) Eduard von Grebmer
- Fitness coach: (Italy) Riccardo Carbonaro
- Goalkeeping coach: (Italy) Luigi Malavasi
- Physiotherapist: (Italy) Lorenzo Donati

=== Transfers ===
Transfers for the 2023–24 season

Joining

- (Italy) Selmi Haj Frej (GK) from (Italy) Pallamano Carpi

Leaving

- (Montenegro) Bogdan Petričević (CB) to (Montenegro) RK Lovćen

== Titles ==
- Serie A Gold
  - Winner (1) : 2005
- Italian Cup
  - Winner (1) : 2004
- Italian Super Cup
  - Winner (1) : 2005

== EHF ranking ==
As of 12/10/2023

Rank	Team	Points
192	(Slovenia) RK Jeruzalem Ormož	14
193	(Poland) Unia Tarnów	14
194	(Iceland) KA Handball	13
195	(Italy) Handball Meran	13
196	(Ukraine) HC ZTR Zaporizhzhia	13
197	(Portugal) Madeira Andebol SAD	13
198	(Lithuania) HC Amber	13

== Former club members ==
=== Notable former players ===
- (Italy) (Croatia) Andrea Bašić (2016-2017)
- (Italy) (Croatia) Bruno Brzić (2006-2008)
- (Italy) Andrea Colleluori (2022-)
- (Italy) Michael Niederwieser (2002-2006)
- (Italy) Jürgen Prantner (1988-1992, 1993-1997, 1999-2003)
- (Italy) Leo Prantner (2017-2018, 2019-2021)
- (Italy) Max Prantner (2018-2023)
- (Italy) (Slovenia) Jan Radojkovič (2017-2018)
- (Argentina) Fernando Gabriel García (2006-2008)
- (Argentina) Leonardo Facundo Querín (2006-2008)
- (Belarus) Yuri Karpuk (1998-1999)
- (France) Bernard Latchimy (2002-2003)
- (Germany) Maik Makowka (2005-2006)
- (Hungary) Krisztián Szép Kis (2003-2004)
- (Montenegro) Bogdan Petričević (2019-2023)
- (Russia) Valery Gopin (1994-1996, 2001-2003)
- (Serbia) Jovan Kovačević (2003-2007)
