= Stefano Arcieri =

Italian handball player (born 1998)

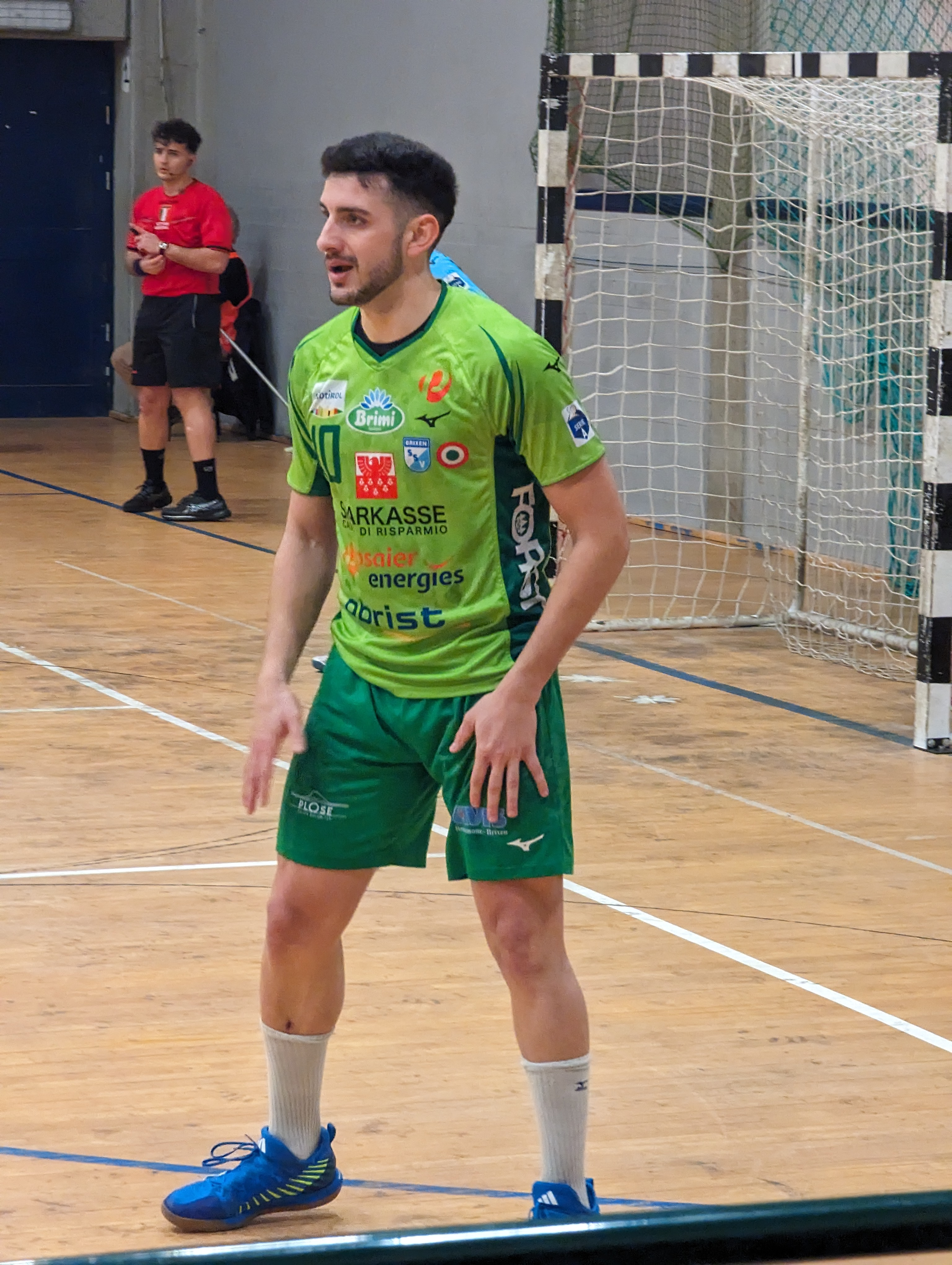

Personal information
- Born: May 8, 1998 (age 28) Teramo, Italy
- Height: 1.90 m (6 ft 3 in)

Sport
- Sport: Handball
- Position: Left wing
- Current club: Albatro Siracusa
- Number: 18

Youth career
- Years: Team
- –2015: Teramo Handball

Senior clubs
- Years: Team
- 2015–2018: Teramo Handball
- 2015–2017: → Junior Fasano
- 2017–2018: → Polisportiva Cingoli
- 2018–2020: SSV Bozen Loacker
- 2020–2021: Riihimäen Cocks
- 2021: Handball Siena
- 2021-2026: SSV Brixen Handball
- 2026-: Albatro Siracusa
National team
Years	Team	Apps	(Gls)
2018–	Italy	22	(43)
- Updated on 14 December 2024

Stefano Arcieri (born 8 May 1998) is an Italian handball player who currently play for Italian club Albatro Siracusa and the Italian national team.
