= Leo Prantner =

Italian handball player (born 2001)

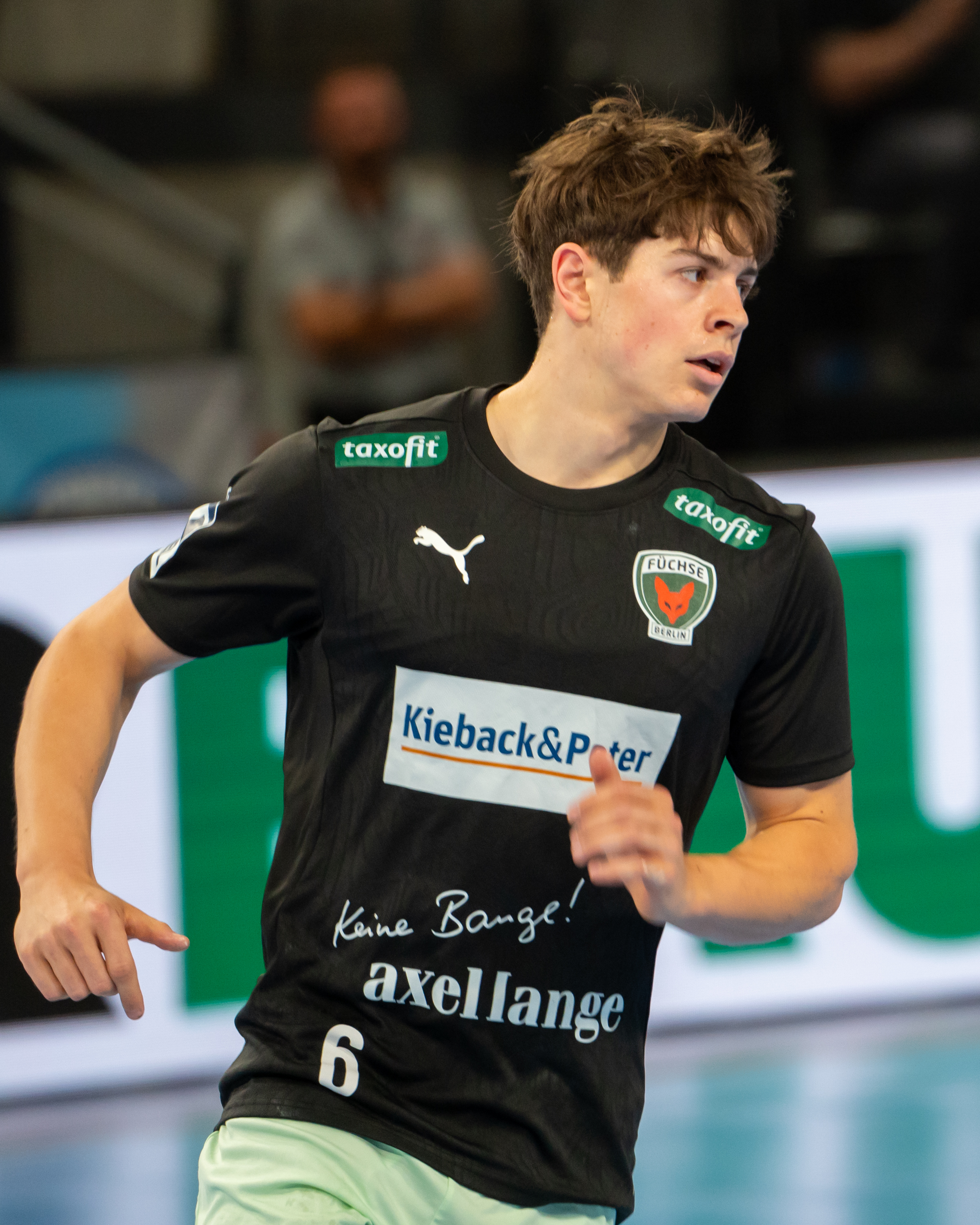
- Prantner (2022)

Personal information
- Nationality: Italian
- Born: 21 November 2001 (age 24) Meran, Italy
- Height: 1.78 m (5 ft 10 in)

Sport
- Sport: Handball
- Position: Right wing
- Current club: Füchse Berlin
- Number: 6

Youth career
- Years: Team
- –2018: Sport Club Meran Handball
- 2018–2019: SG Flensburg-Handewitt

Senior clubs
- Years: Team
- 2019–2021: Sport Club Meran Handball
- 2021–2023: Rebi Balonmano Cuenca
- 2023–2024: HBW Balingen-Weilstetten
- 2025–: Füchse Berlin
National team
Years	Team	Apps	(Gls)
2021–	Italy	28	(18)
- Updated on 6 January 2025

Leo Prantner (born 24 November 2001 in Meran, Italy) is an Italian handball player for Füchse Berlin and the Italian national team.

He started playing handball in his hometown club Sport Club Meran Handball. In 2018, he switched to the academy, of the German club SG Flensburg-Handewitt, but didn't break through, and returned a year later to his boyhood club.

In 2021, he joined Spanish side Rebi Balonmano Cuenca.

In 2023, he returned to Germany to join HBW Balingen-Weilstetten.

On January 30th 2025 Füchse Berlin announced that they had signed Leo Prantner on a deal until 2027. In his first season at the club, he won the Bundesliga. This was the first league title in club history. The same season he played in the 2024-25 EHF Champions League final, where Füchse lost to league rivals SC Magdeburg.

== Private ==
His brother Max Prantner is also a professional handball player. Their father, Jürgen Prantner, is a handball coach and former player.
