= Junior Fasano =

Italian handball club

Pallamano Junior Fasano
- Founded: 1980; 46 years ago
- Arena: Nuovo Palazzetto dello sport
- Capacity: 2,200
- President: Giovanni Caramia
- Head coach: Vito Fovio
- League: Serie A Gold
- 2023-24: 1st, champion
- Club colours
Home	Away

Junior Fasano is an Italian handball club from Fasano, that plays in the Serie A Gold.

Location of Junior Fasano

== History ==
In the early 1980s, the idea of Fasano Junior Sport Club having a handball department was born. The club started in the Serie D championship in the 1980-81 season. Its first president was Luigi Crescenzo. The club was promoted to the first division, Serie A for the first time at the end of the 1998-99 season. The team participated in an international cup for the first time in the 2007-2008 Challenge Cup. In 2014, the team coached by Francesco Ancona won the Italian Cup by beating Carpi 30-27. In 2014, the team also won the championship against SSV Bozen Loacker, and thus won the first league title in the club's history. During its history, it has won 4 national championships (in 2014, 2016, 2018 and 2023), 3 Italian Cups (in 2014, 2016 and 2017) and 1 Italian Super Cup (in 2016).

== Crest, colours, supporters ==
=== Club crest ===
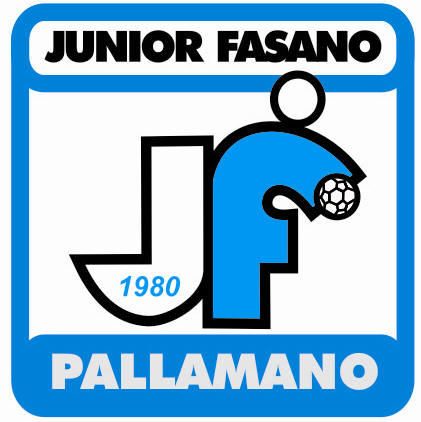
Old Logo
(-2016)

=== Kits ===
HOME
2017–18	2021–22	2022–23

AWAY
2016–17	2021–22	2022–23

== Sports Hall information ==
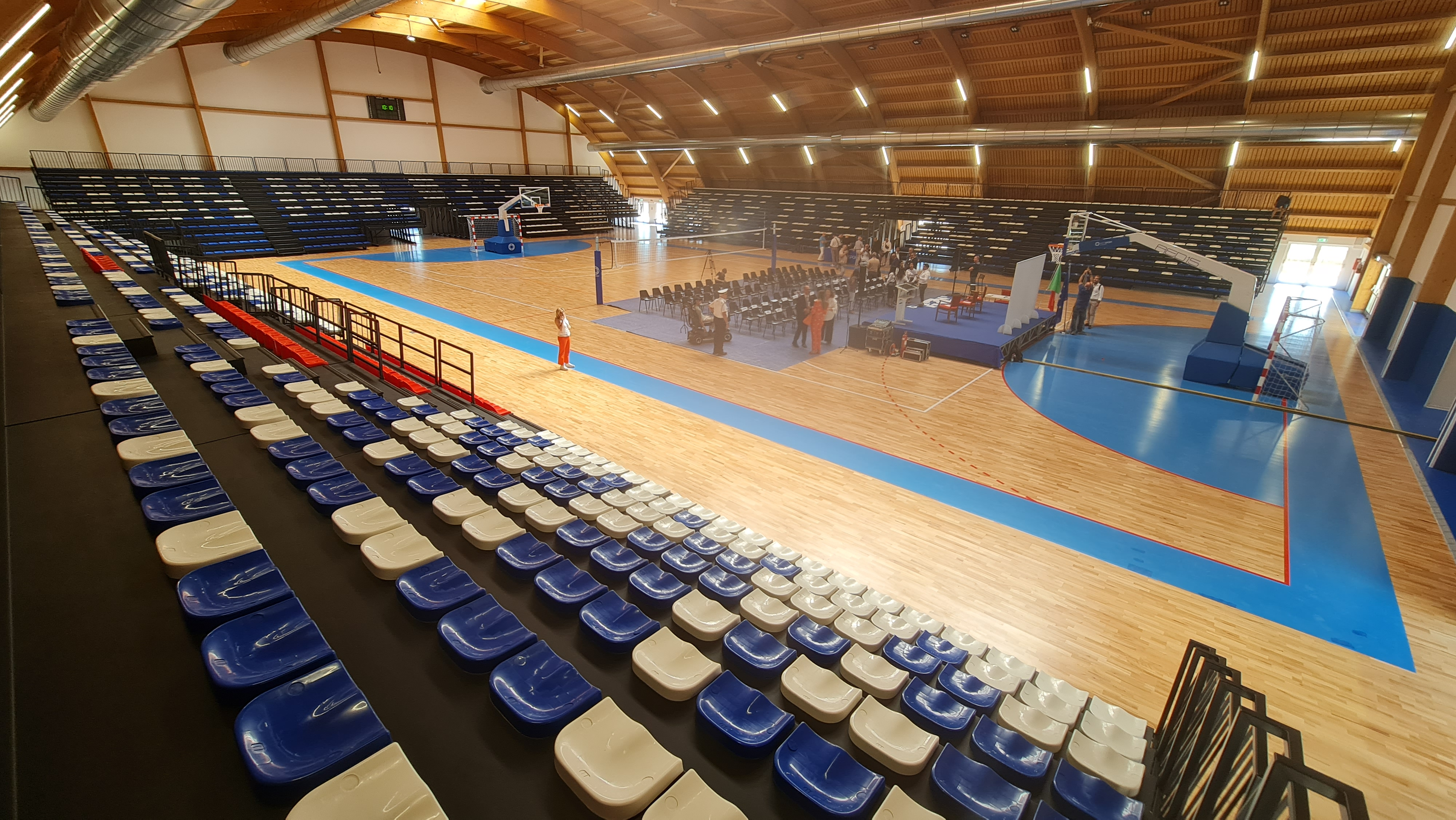
Home hall: Nuovo Palazzetto dello sport

- Arena: - Nuovo Palazzetto dello sport
- City: - Fasano
- Capacity: - 2200
- Address: - 72015 Fasano, Province of Brindisi, Italy

== Management ==
Position	Name
President	(Italy) Giovanni Caramia
Club manager	(Italy) Paolo De Santis

== Team ==
=== Current squad ===
Squad for the 2024–25 season

Junior Fasano

Goalkeepers

- 1 (Italy) Simone Sibilio
- 12 (Italy) Alessandro Leban
- 22 (Italy) Daniele Vinci

Left Wingers

- 19 (Argentina) Pablo Gastón Cantore
- 33 (Italy) Nicola Legrottaglie

Right Wingers

- 15 (Italy) Leonardo Boggia

Line Players

- 18 (Italy) Denni Gallo
- 34 (Italy) Zoe Mizzoni
- 41 (Argentina) Matías Beorlegui

Left Backs

- 17 (Italy) Donato Nardelli
- 23 (Montenegro) Željko Beharević
- 24 (Uruguay) Giovanni Capello

Central Backs

- 9 (Uruguay) Luciano Rivan
- 21 (Portugal) João Cunha

Right Backs

- 11 (Italy) Davide Pugliese
- 14 (Italy) Davide Notarangelo

=== Technical staff ===
- Head coach: (Italy) Domenico Iaia
- Assistant coach: (Italy) Giuseppe Crastolla
- Fitness coach: (Italy) (Montenegro) Željko Beharević
- Club doctor: (Italy) Dr. Domenico Ancona

=== Transfers ===
Transfers for the 2025–26 season

Joining

- (Tunisia) Hechmi Belhareth (LB) from (France) Angers SCO Handball
- (Italy) Giorgio Rossa (GK) from (Italy) Belluno
- (Algeria) Nidhal Blida (RB) from (Qatar) Al-Shamal
- (Italy) Antonio Capozzoli (LB) from (Italy) Campus Italia
- (Italy) Valentino Dello Vicario (LP) from (Italy) Camerano
- (Italy) Gabriele Somma (LW) from (Italy) Campus Italia
- (Italy) Diego Somma (CB) from (Italy) Macagi Cingoli
- (Chile) Aaron Codina Vivanco (LB) from (Italy) Raimond Sassari
- (Italy) Pablo Marrochi (CB) from (Italy) Conversano

Leaving

- (Italy) Davide Pugliese (RB) to (Spain) Club Balonmano Nava
- (Argentina) Pablo Cantore (LW)
- (Uruguay) Giovanni Capello (LB)
- (Portugal) João Cunha (LB) to (Italy) Metelli Cologne
- (Italy) Zoe Mizzoni (LP)
- (Uruguay) Luciano Rivan (LB)

== Titles ==
- Serie A Gold
  - Winner (4) : 2014, 2016, 2018, 2023
- Italian Cup
  - Winner (3) : 2014, 2016, 2017
- Italian Super Cup
  - Winner (1) : 2016

== EHF ranking ==
As of 03/04/2025

Rank	Team	Points
100	(Czech Republic) HC Dukla Praha	52
101	(Spain) Rebi Cuenca	52
102	(Montenegro) RK Lovćen	51
103	(Italy) Junior Fasano	50
104	(Belgium) HC Visé BM	50
105	(Czech Republic) SKKP Brno	48
106	(Kosovo) KH Besa Famgas	47

== Former club members ==
=== Notable former players ===
- (Italy) Stefano Arcieri (2015-2017)
- (Italy) Umberto Bronzo (2018-2019)
- (Italy) (Croatia) Bruno Brzić (2013-2015)
- (Italy) Giancarlo Costanzo (2009-2011, 2012-2015, 2017-2018)
- (Italy) Nicolò D'Antino (2016-2018)
- (Italy) Vito Fovio (1995-2002, 2013-2019, 2020-2022)
- (Italy) Umberto Giannoccaro (2005-2015)
- (Italy) Leonardo Lopasso (1986-2000, 2009-2011, 2012-2015)
- (Italy) Pasquale Maione (2013-2018)
- (Italy) (Slovenia) Demis Radovčić (2016–2019)
- (Italy) Carlo Sperti (2021-2023)
- (Italy) Riccardo Stabellini (2022)
- (Argentina) Guido Riccobelli (2015-2016, 2018)
- (Chile) Víctor Donoso (2018-2019)
- (Romania) Petru Pop (1999–2000)
- (Romania) Adrian Popovici (1999-2006)
