= Oskars Arājs =

Latvian handball player (born 1990)

Personal information
- Nationality: Latvian
- Born: 4 August 1990 (age 36) Dobele, Latvia
- Height: 1.88 m (6 ft 2 in)

Sport
- Sport: Handball
- Position: Left wing
- Current club: ZRHK Tenax Dobele
- Number: 44
National team
| Years | Team | Apps | (Gls) |
| – | Latvia | 42 | (44) |

Oskars Arājs (born 4 August 1990) is a Latvian handball player for ZRHK Tenax Dobele and the Latvian national team.

He represented Latvia at the 2020 European Men's Handball Championship. This was Latvias first ever appearance at a major international tournament. They finished 24th out of 24 teams.
