= Nils Kreicbergs =

Latvian handball player (born 1996)

Personal information
- Nationality: Latvian
- Born: 23 May 1996 (age 30) Dobele, Latvia
- Height: 1.92 m (6 ft 4 in)

Sport
- Sport: Handball
- Position: Left back
- Current club: ZRHK Tenax Dobele
- Number: 17
National team
Years	Team	Apps	(Gls)
–	Latvia	48	(93)

Nils Kreicbergs (born 23 May 1996) is a Latvian handball player for ZRHK Tenax Dobele and the Latvian national team.

He represented Latvia at the 2020 European Men's Handball Championship. This was Latvia's first ever appearance at a major international tournament. They finished 24th out of 24 teams.
