= Serie A (men's handball) =

Men's handball league

Serie A Gold
- Current season, competition or edition: 2025–26 Serie A (men's handball)
- Sport: Handball
- Founded: 1969
- No. of teams: 14
- Country: Italy
- Confederation: EHF
- Most recent champion: Cassano Magnago HC
- Most titles: Pallamano Trieste 1970 (17 titles)
- Relegation to: Serie A Silver
- International cup: EHF European Cup
- Website: https://www.federhandball.it/

The Italian Serie A, officially named Serie A Gold, is the highest level men's handball league of Italy.

== Competition format ==
The league has 14 teams playing against each other in a round-robin tournament. The champion is determined by playoffs between the top four teams at the end of the regular season. The team ranked last at the end of the regular season, as well as the losing team of the playouts, are relegated to Serie A2.

== 2025/26 Season participants ==
The following 14 clubs compete in the Serie A during the 2024-25 season.

Team	City	Arena
Alperia Black Devils	Merano	Black Devils Arena
SSV Bozen Loacker	Bolzano	PalaGasteiner
SSV Brixen	Bressanone	Raffeisen Arena
Metelli Cologne	Cologne	PalaDante
Cassano Magnago HC	Cassano Magnago	PalaTacca
Pallamano Conversano	Conversano	Pala San Giacomo
Junior Fasano	Fasano	PalaZizzi
Polisportiva Cingoli	Cingoli	PalaQuaresima
Pallamano Pressano	Lavis	PaLavis
Pallamano Chiaravalle	Chiaravalle	Palasport di Via Firenze
Handball Sassari	Sassari	PalaSantoru
Pallamano Trieste 1970	Trieste	PalaChiarbola
ASV Sparer Eppan	Appiano	Raiffeisenhalle
Teamnetwork Albatro Siracusa	Siracusa	PalaAkradina

== Serie A past champions ==
- 1970 : Buscaglione Roma
- 1971 : HC Flaminio Genovesi Roma
- 1972 : CUS Verona
- 1973 : C.S. Esercito Roma
- 1974 : HC Rovereto
- 1975 : HC Rovereto (2)
- 1976 : Pallamano Trieste 1970
- 1977 : Pallamano Trieste 1970 (2)
- 1978 : HC Rovereto (3)
- 1979 : Pallamano Trieste 1970 (3)
- 1980 : HC Rovereto (4)
- 1981 : Pallamano Trieste 1970 (4)
- 1982 : Pallamano Trieste 1970 (5)
- 1983 : Pallamano Trieste 1970 (6)
- 1984 : HC Scafati
- 1985 : Pallamano Trieste 1970 (7)
- 1986 : Pallamano Trieste 1970 (8)
- 1987 : CC Ortigia Siracusa
- 1988 : CC Ortigia Siracusa (2)
- 1989 : CC Ortigia Siracusa (3)
- 1990 : Pallamano Trieste (9)
- 1991 : SSV Brixen Handball
- 1992 : SSV Brixen Handball (2)
- 1993 : Pallamano Trieste 1970 (10)
- 1994 : Pallamano Trieste 1970 (11)
- 1995 : Pallamano Trieste 1970 (12)
- 1996 : Pallamano Trieste 1970 (13)
- 1997 : Pallamano Trieste 1970 (14)
- 1998 : Pallamano Prato
- 1999 : Pallamano Prato (2)
- 2000 : Pallamano Trieste 1970 (15)
- 2001 : Pallamano Trieste 1970 (16)
- 2002 : Pallamano Trieste 1970 (17)
- 2003 : Handball Club Conversano
- 2004 : Handball Club Conversano (2)
- 2005 : SC Merano
- 2006 : Handball Club Conversano (3)
- 2007 : Handball Casarano
- 2008 : Handball Casarano (2)
- 2009 : Handball Casarano (3)
- 2010 : Handball Club Conversano (4)
- 2011 : Handball Club Conversano (5)
- 2012 : SSV Bozen Loacker
- 2013 : SSV Bozen Loacker (2)
- 2014 : Junior Fasano
- 2015 : SSV Bozen Loacker (3)
- 2016 : Junior Fasano (2)
- 2017 : SSV Bozen Loacker (4)
- 2018 : Junior Fasano (3)
- 2019 : SSV Bozen Loacker (5)
- 2020 : not assigned
- 2021 : Handball Club Conversano (6)
- 2022 : Handball Club Conversano (7)
- 2023 : Junior Fasano (4)
- 2024 : Junior Fasano (5)
- 2025 : Handball Club Conversano (8)
- 2026 : Cassano Magnago HC

	Club	Titles	Year
1.	Pallamano Trieste 1970	17	1976, 1977, 1979, 1981, 1982, 1983, 1985, 1986, 1990, 1993, 1994, 1995, 1996, 1997, 2000, 2001, 2002
2.	Handball Club Conversano	8	2003, 2004, 2006, 2010, 2011, 2021, 2022, 2025
3.	SSV Bozen Loacker	5	2012, 2013, 2015, 2017, 2019
	Junior Fasano	5	2014, 2016, 2018, 2023, 2024
5.	HC Rovereto	4	1974, 1975, 1978, 1980
6.	CC Ortigia Siracusa	3	1987, 1988, 1989
	Handball Casarano	3	2007, 2008, 2009
8.	SSV Brixen Handball	2	1991, 1992
	Pallamano Prato	2	1998, 1999
10.	Buscaglione Roma	1	1970
	HC Flaminio Genovesi Roma	1	1971
	CUS Verona	1	1972
	C.S. Esercito Roma	1	1973
	HC Scafati	1	1984
	SC Merano	1	2005
	Cassano Magnago HC	1	2026

== EHF coefficient ranking ==
For the season 2022/2023:

- 34. (42) (Estonia) Meistriliiga (9.00)
- 35. (36) (Latvia) SynotTip Virsliga (7.33)
- 36. (38) (Italy) Serie A (4.33)
- 37. (33) (Bulgaria) GHR A (3.33)
- 38. (34) (United Kingdom) Multiple ones (2.67)
