= Stanislav Zhukov =

Ukrainian handball player

Personal information
- Nationality: Ukrainian
- Born: 26 March 1992 (age 34) Novovolynsk, Ukraine
- Height: 2.00 m (6 ft 7 in)

Sport
- Sport: Handball
- Position: Left back
- Current club: VfL Gummersbach
- Number: 26
National team
| Years | Team | Apps | (Gls) |
| – | Ukraine | 40 | (103) |

Stanislav Zhukov (Ukrainian: Станіслав Жуков, born 26 March 1992) is a Ukrainian handball player for VfL Gummersbach and the Ukrainian national team.

He represented Ukraine at the 2020 European Men's Handball Championship.
