= Egils Politers =

Latvian handball player (born 1990)

Personal information
- Nationality: Latvian
- Born: 18 February 1990 (age 36) Dobele, Latvia
- Height: 1.95 m (6 ft 5 in)

Sport
- Sport: Handball
- Position: Pivot
- Current club: ZRHK Tenax Dobele
- Number: 35
National team
Years	Team	Apps	(Gls)
–	Latvia	41	(54)

Egils Politers (born 18 February 1990) is a Latvian handball player for ZRHK Tenax Dobele and the Latvian national team.

He represented Latvia at the 2020 European Men's Handball Championship. This was Latvias first ever appearance at a major international tournament. They finished 24th out of 24 teams.
