= SSV Bozen Loacker =

Men's handball club

- Full name: Südtiroler Sportverein Bozen Handball
- Founded: 1965
- Arena: PalaResia
- Capacity: 3000
- President: Evi Seebacher
- Head coach: Mario Šporčić
- League: Serie A
- 2018–2019: Winner
Home	Away

SSV Bozen Loacker is a men's handball club from Bolzano, Italy, that plays in the Serie A.

The club was founded in 1965 and reached the highest Italian league for the first time in 1969-70. They won their first Italian championship in 2011-12.

== Titles ==
- Serie A :
  - Winners (5) : 2011–12, 2012–13, 2014–15, 2016–17, 2018–19
- Italian Cup :
  - Winners (5) : 2011–12, 2012–13, 2014–15, 2018–19, 2019–20
- Italian Super Cup :
  - Winners (4) : 2012, 2015, 2017, 2019

== European history ==
Season	Competition	Round	Club	Home	Away	Aggregate
2011–12	EHF Challenge Cup	Round 3	(Kosovo) KH Prishtina	43–20	34–27	77–47
2011–12	EHF Challenge Cup	1/8	(Romania) HC Caras-Severin	22–25	27–19	49–44
2011–12	EHF Challenge Cup	1/4	(Switzerland) Wacker Thun	25–31	32–33	57–64
2012–13	EHF Champions League	Qualif. Group 3	(Romania) HCM Constanta		22–33	
2012–13	EHF Champions League	Qualif. Group 3	(Israel) Maccabi Rishon LeZion	30–33		
2012–13	EHF Cup	Round 2	(Portugal) S.L. Benfica	25–40	20–32	45–72
2014–15	EHF Cup	Qual. Round 1	(Czech Republic) Talent M.A.S. Plzen	17–24	26–26	43–50
2015–16	EHF Cup	Qual. Round 1	(Iceland) Haukar Handball	30–24	20–26	50–50
2017–18	EHF Cup	Qual. Round 1	(Iceland) Valur	31–30	27–34	58–64
2019–20	EHF Cup	Qual. Round 1	(Austria) Alpla HC Hard	24–23	26–28	50–51

== Team ==
=== 2024–25 squad ===
Squad for the 2024–25 season

Goalkeepers

- 33 (Italy) Stefano Martinati
- 44 (Poland) Jakub Matlęga

Wingers
RW

- 2 (Italy) Riccardo Di Giulio
- 3 (Italy) Leonardo Trevisiol

LW

- 7 (Italy) Jonas Walcher
- 17 (Italy) Samuel Zanetti

Line players

- 31 (Italy) Alberto Gazzini
- 34 (Tunisia) Mohamed Memmich

Back players
LB

- 23 (Italy) Dean Turković
- 32 (Croatia) Alan Javor

CB

- 5 (Serbia) Aleksandar Miličević
- 22 (Croatia) Erik Udovičić

RB

- 9 (Italy) Marzo Zanon

=== Transfers ===
Transfers for the 2026–27 season

Joining

Leaving

- (Poland) Jakub Matlęga (GK) to (Poland) Piotrkowianin Piotrków Trybunalski

=== Transfer History ===
Transfers for the 2025–26 season

Joining

- (Poland) Jakub Matlęga (GK) from (Poland) MMTS Kwidzyn
- (Tunisia) Mohamed Memmich (LP) from (United Arab Emirates) Al Nasr
- (Croatia) Alan Javor (LB) from (Slovenia) Riko Ribnica
- (Serbia) Aleksandar Miličević (CB) from (Romania) HC Odorheiu Secuiesc

Leaving

- (Bosnia and Herzegovina) Marko Pandzic (LB) to (Bosnia and Herzegovina) RK Gradačac
- (Italy) Gabriele Sontacchi (LP) to (Germany) 1. VfL Potsdam
- (Montenegro) Goran Anđelić (GK) to (Montenegro) RK Budvanska Rivijera
