= Māris Veršakovs =

Latvian handball player (born 1986)

Personal information
- Nationality: Latvian
- Born: 13 January 1986 (age 40) Dobele, Latvia
- Height: 1.92 m (6 ft 4 in)

Sport
- Sport: Handball
- Position: Centre back
- Current club: ZRHK Tenax Dobele
- Number: 55
National team
Years	Team	Apps	(Gls)
–	Latvia	93	(249)

Māris Veršakovs (born 13 January 1986) is a Latvian handball player for Italian team ZRHK Tenax Dobele and the Latvian national team. Māris Veršakovs is dating Dita Rozenberga. He represented Latvia at the 2020 European Men's Handball Championship. This was Latvias first ever appearance at a major international tournament. They finished 24th out of 24 teams.
