= 2020 European Men's Handball Championship squads =

This article displays the squads for the 2020 European Men's Handball Championship. Each team consisted of up to 28 players, of whom 16 may be fielded for each match.

Age, club, caps and goals as of 9 January 2020.

== Group A ==
=== Belarus ===
A 17-player squad was announced on 26 December 2019. On 2 January Uladzislau Kulesh, Aliaksandr Padshyvalau and Mikalai Aliokhin were added to the squad. The final squad was announced on 6 January 2020.

Head coach: Yuri Shevtsov

No.	Pos.	Name	Date of birth (age)	Height	App.	Goals	Club
1	GK	Ivan Matskevich	8 May 1991 (aged 28)	1.86 m	80	5	(Belarus) Meshkov Brest
2	LW	Ivan Brouka	20 April 1980 (aged 39)	1.85 m	197	598	(Belarus) SKA Minsk
3	LB	Uladzislau Kulesh	28 May 1996 (aged 23)	2.06 m	59	166	(Poland) PGE Vive Kielce
8	RB	Siarhei Shylovich	16 May 1986 (aged 33)	1.96 m	150	474	(Belarus) Meshkov Brest
10	CB	Barys Pukhouski	3 January 1987 (aged 33)	1.88 m	196	838	(Ukraine) Motor Zaporizhia
16	GK	Viachaslau Saldatsenka	23 August 1994 (aged 25)	1.89 m	66	1	(Romania) CSM Bacău
17	CB	Dzmitry Nikulenkau	12 July 1984 (aged 35)	1.92 m	116	198	(Belarus) SKA Minsk
22	P	Viachaslau Shumak	22 December 1988 (aged 31)	2.02 m	84	43	(Belarus) Meshkov Brest
23	LW	Andrei Yurynok	21 September 1996 (aged 23)	1.96 m	73	191	(Belarus) Meshkov Brest
24	RW	Maksim Baranau	11 April 1988 (aged 31)	1.90 m	142	350	(Belarus) Meshkov Brest
26	P	Yury Lukyanchuk	5 January 1990 (aged 30)	1.95 m	13	21	(Finland) Riihimäki Cocks
40	GK	Aliaksei Kishou	23 September 1986 (aged 33)	1.94 m	46	0	(Belarus) SKA Minsk
47	CB	Aliaksandr Padshyvalau	8 March 1996 (aged 23)	1.90 m	48	76	(Germany) GWD Minden
50	P	Artsem Karalek	20 February 1996 (aged 23)	1.96 m	66	230	(Poland) PGE Vive Kielce
55	RW	Mikita Vailupau	30 July 1995 (aged 24)	1.86 m	27	75	(Belarus) Meshkov Brest
74	P	Viachaslau Bokhan	7 April 1996 (aged 23)	2.06 m	35	27	(Belarus) SKA Minsk
95	LB	Vadim Gayduchenko	24 April 1995 (aged 24)	1.93 m	51	116	(France) Saint-Raphaël Var Handball

=== Croatia ===
A 18-player squad was announced on 30 December 2019. The final squad was announced on 7 January 2020.

Head coach: Lino Červar

No.	Pos.	Name	Date of birth (age)	Height	App.	Goals	Club
3	P	Marino Marić	1 June 1990 (aged 29)	1.96 m	55	103	(Germany) MT Melsungen
5	CB	Domagoj Duvnjak	1 June 1988 (aged 31)	1.97 m	202	658	(Germany) THW Kiel
6	LB	Matej Hrstić	11 August 1996 (aged 23)	1.97 m	1	1	(Croatia) PPD Zagreb
7	RB	Luka Stepančić	20 November 1990 (aged 29)	2.03 m	83	210	(Hungary) MOL-Pick Szeged
13	RW	Zlatko Horvat	25 September 1984 (aged 35)	1.79 m	173	541	(Croatia) PPD Zagreb
17	LB	Josip Šarac	24 February 1998 (aged 21)	2.01 m	2	0	(Slovenia) Celje Pivovarna Laško
18	CB	Igor Karačić	2 November 1988 (aged 31)	1.89 m	76	179	(Poland) PGE Vive Kielce
28	P	Željko Musa	8 January 1986 (aged 34)	2.00 m	121	102	(Germany) SC Magdeburg
30	LB	Marko Mamić	6 March 1994 (aged 25)	2.00 m	54	93	(Germany) SC DHfK Leipzig
33	CB	Luka Cindrić	5 July 1993 (aged 26)	1.82 m	59	139	(Spain) FC Barcelona
34	P	Ilija Brozović	26 May 1991 (aged 28)	1.95 m	34	38	(Germany) TSV Hannover-Burgdorf
36	RW	Vlado Matanović	29 May 1995 (aged 24)	1.82 m	3	9	(Slovenia) Gorenje Velenje
39	LW	David Mandić	14 September 1997 (aged 22)	1.87 m	22	67	(Croatia) PPD Zagreb
50	LW	Valentino Ravnić	20 July 1995 (aged 24)	1.90 m	6	5	(Croatia) PPD Zagreb
53	P	Marin Šipić	29 April 1996 (aged 23)	1.90 m	22	47	(Croatia) PPD Zagreb
55	GK	Marin Šego	2 August 1985 (aged 34)	1.98 m	41	2	(France) Montpellier Handball
60	GK	Matej Ašanin	4 September 1993 (aged 26)	2.06 m	7	0	(Croatia) PPD Zagreb

=== Montenegro ===
The squad was announced 22 December 2019. On 5 January 2020, Miloš Vujović was replaced by Filip Vujović due to an injury.

Head coach: Zoran Roganović

No.	Pos.	Name	Date of birth (age)	Height	App.	Goals	Club
2	LW	Filip Vujović	7 April 1996 (aged 23)	1.85 m	0	0	(Spain) Frigoríficos del Morrazo
3	CB	Aleksandar Glendža	1 December 1995 (aged 24)	1.97 m	0	0	(Slovenia) Slovenj Gradec
4	LW	Aleksandar Bakić	3 September 2000 (aged 19)	1.94 m	4	4	(Montenegro) RK Komovi
7	RB	Stefan Čavor	3 November 1994 (aged 25)	1.96 m	36	78	(Germany) HSG Wetzlar
8	P	Vuk Lazović	10 March 1988 (aged 31)	1.99 m	13	8	(South Korea) SK Hawks
11	RB	Branko Vujović	20 April 1998 (aged 21)	1.94 m	7	4	(Poland) PGE Vive Kielce
12	GK	Mile Mijušković	8 October 1985 (aged 34)	1.92 m	29	0	(Spain) Liberbank Cantabria Sinfín
13	RW	Mirko Radović	15 June 1990 (aged 29)	1.82 m	37	31	(North Macedonia) Eurofarm Rabotnik
16	GK	Nebojša Simić	19 January 1993 (aged 26)	1.91 m	28	0	(Germany) MT Melsungen
19	P	Branko Kankaraš	25 August 1988 (aged 31)	1.92 m	11	7	(Belarus) Meshkov Brest
20	LB	Stevan Vujović	7 April 1990 (aged 29)	1.95 m	38	79	(Ukraine) Motor Zaporizhia
21	LB	Vasko Ševaljević	21 June 1988 (aged 31)	1.93 m	49	215	Tremblay-en-France
24	LB	Miloš Božović	10 December 1994 (aged 25)	1.96 m	25	59	(Croatia) PPD Zagreb
25	RW	Marko Lasica	30 April 1988 (aged 31)	1.88 m	47	51	(Turkey) Beşiktaş
32	CB	Božo Anđelić	16 March 1992 (aged 27)	1.86 m	26	30	(Hungary) FTC-HungaroControl
90	P	Nemanja Grbović	26 April 1990 (aged 29)	1.87 m	48	112	(Romania) Steaua București
93	RB	Vladan Lipovina	7 March 1993 (aged 26)	1.98 m	28	64	(Germany) HBW Balingen-Weilstetten

=== Serbia ===
The squad was revealed on 30 December 2018.

Head coach: Nenad Peruničić

No.	Pos.	Name	Date of birth (age)	Height	App.	Goals	Club
5	LB	Ivan Mošić	23 December 1994 (aged 25)	1.94 m	17	29	(Spain) Abanca Ademar León
7	CB	Stefan Vujić	6 July 1991 (aged 28)	1.92 m	28	47	(Romania) Dinamo București
8	LB	Stevan Sretenović	25 September 1995 (aged 24)	2.01 m	24	58	(Serbia) Vojvodina
9	RB	Nikola Crnoglavac	22 April 1992 (aged 27)	1.95 m	17	38	(Romania) CSM Bacău
10	RW	Milan Ðukić	16 August 1985 (aged 34)	1.85 m	11	19	(North Macedonia) Eurofarm Rabotnik
13	P	Živan Pešić	7 July 1993 (aged 26)	1.93 m	23	29	(Croatia) Nexe Našice
14	RW	Bogdan Radivojević	2 March 1993 (aged 26)	1.92 m	45	96	(Hungary) MOL-Pick Szeged
17	CB	Aleksa Kolaković	10 August 1997 (aged 22)	1.92 m	4	9	(France) Saint-Raphaël Var Handball
19	LW	Nemanja Ilić	11 May 1990 (aged 29)	1.78 m	77	231	(France) Fenix Toulouse Handball
20	LB	Miljan Pušica	30 June 1991 (aged 28)	2.00 m	42	75	(Germany) GWD Minden
21	LW	Vanja Ilić	25 February 1993 (aged 26)	1.80 m	27	47	(France) C' Chartres Métropole Handball
23	P	Zoran Nikolić	23 February 1991 (aged 28)	1.88 m	31	55	(Romania) HC Dobrogea Sud Constanța
24	CB	Lazar Kukić	12 December 1995 (aged 24)	1.86 m	28	38	(Spain) BM Logroño La Rioja
25	RB	Nemanja Zelenović	27 February 1990 (aged 29)	1.94 m	88	254	(Germany) Frisch Auf Göppingen
33	P	Mijajlo Marsenić	9 March 1993 (aged 26)	2.03 m	81	174	(Germany) Füchse Berlin
76	GK	Vladimir Cupara	19 February 1994 (aged 25)	1.98 m	36	3	(Hungary) Telekom Veszprém
90	GK	Tibor Ivanišević	16 August 1990 (aged 29)	1.96 m	27	0	(Germany) HSG Wetzlar

== Group B ==
=== Austria ===
An 18-player squad was revealed on 30 December 2019. The final squad was announced on 7 January 2020.

Head coach: (Slovenia) Aleš Pajovič

No.	Pos.	Name	Date of birth (age)	Height	App.	Goals	Club
1	GK	Thomas Bauer	24 January 1986 (aged 33)	1.90 m	151	0	(Portugal) FC Porto
7	RB	Janko Božović	14 July 1985 (aged 34)	2.04 m	148	393	(Germany) VfL Gummersbach
8	RW	Robert Weber	25 November 1985 (aged 34)	1.79 m	175	764	(Germany) HSG Nordhorn-Lingen
9	RW	David Brandfellner	20 November 1992 (aged 27)	1.79 m	9	12	(Austria) Fivers Margareten
13	RW	Richard Wöss	10 October 1986 (aged 33)	1.86 m	78	113	(Austria) Handball Tirol
15	P	Fabian Posch	5 January 1988 (aged 32)	1.98 m	101	158	(Austria) UHK Krems
20	LW	Sebastian Frimmel	18 December 1995 (aged 24)	1.90 m	53	123	(Switzerland) Kadetten Schaffhausen
24	LB	Daniel Dicker	5 June 1995 (aged 24)	1.99 m	11	10	(Austria) HSG Graz
26	P	Lukas Herburger	19 December 1994 (aged 25)	1.97 m	26	19	(Switzerland) Kadetten Schaffhausen
28	CB	Gerald Zeiner	28 June 1988 (aged 31)	1.90 m	45	99	(Austria) Alpla HC Hard
30	RB	Boris Zivkovic	2 May 1992 (aged 27)	1.95 m	24	26	(Austria) Alpla HC Hard
40	GK	Thomas Eichberger	20 August 1993 (aged 26)	1.95 m	3	0	(Austria) HSG Graz
53	CB	Nikola Bilyk	28 November 1996 (aged 23)	2.00 m	68	270	(Germany) THW Kiel
55	P	Tobias Wagner	26 March 1995 (aged 24)	1.98 m	47	80	(Austria) Fivers Margareten
60	CB	Jakob Jochmann	2 October 1993 (aged 26)	1.78 m	6	10	(Austria) UHK Krems
72	LB	Lukas Hutecek	2 July 2000 (aged 19)	1.90 m	0	0	(Austria) Fivers Margareten
92	LW	Raul Santos	1 June 1992 (aged 27)	1.80 m	81	302	(Germany) SC DHfK Leipzig

=== Czech Republic ===
An 18-player squad was announced on 30 December 2019. The final squad was announced on 7 January 2020.

Head coach: Jan Filip

No.	Pos.	Name	Date of birth (age)	Height	App.	Goals	Club
1	GK	Tomáš Mrkva	20 January 1989 (aged 30)	2.00 m	90	5	(Germany) Bergischer HC
2	LW	Jakub Hrstka	17 March 1990 (aged 29)	1.86 m	103	337	(Germany) Dessau Rosslauer HV 06
3	CB	Roman Bečvář	18 April 1989 (aged 30)	1.91 m	113	238	(Germany) TuS Nettelstedt-Lübbecke
5	RW	Miroslav Jurka	7 June 1987 (aged 32)	1.89 m	79	163	(Czech Republic) HC Zubří
13	LB	Pavel Horák	28 November 1982 (aged 37)	1.98 m	122	343	(Germany) THW Kiel
16	GK	Martin Galia	12 April 1979 (aged 40)	1.89 m	201	6	(Poland) Górnik Zabrze
17	RB	Stanislav Kašpárek	11 June 1996 (aged 23)	2.02 m	29	108	(Hungary) MOL-Pick Szeged
19	CB	Tomáš Babák	28 December 1993 (aged 26)	1.86 m	64	210	(Germany) Bergischer HC
21	RW	Tomáš Číp	5 October 1989 (aged 30)	1.87 m	68	171	(Romania) CS Minaur Baia Mare
22	P	Peter Šlachta	1 January 1993 (aged 27)	1.99 m	33	36	(Germany) EHV Aue
26	LW	Marek Vančo	12 July 1989 (aged 30)	1.87 m	28	32	(Germany) HC Elbflorenz
27	CB	Ondřej Zdráhala	10 July 1983 (aged 36)	1.88 m	117	395	(Poland) Orlen Wisła Płock
31	LB	Matěj Klíma	24 March 1999 (aged 20)	1.91 m	3	1	(Czech Republic) Dukla Prague
32	LB	Vojtěch Patzel	23 September 1998 (aged 21)	1.90 m	7	5	(Czech Republic) Dukla Prague
34	LB	Dominik Solák	17 August 1997 (aged 22)	1.98 m	8	0	(Czech Republic) HCB Karviná
40	RB	Dieudonné Mubenzem	22 March 1996 (aged 23)	1.90 m	27	34	(Germany) TV Hüttenberg
66	P	Štěpán Zeman	9 May 1997 (aged 22)	2.02 m	26	24	(Germany) HSC 2000 Coburg
99	P	Jan Mojžiš	18 June 1996 (aged 23)	2.00 m	0	0	(Germany) TV Emsdetten

=== North Macedonia ===
A 20-player squad was announced 30 December 2019. The final squad was announced on 8 January 2020.

Head coach: Danilo Brestovac

No.	Pos.	Name	Date of birth (age)	Height	App.	Goals	Club
1	GK	Nikola Mitrevski	3 October 1985 (aged 34)	1.88 m	38	2	(North Macedonia) Eurofarm Rabotnik
3	LW	Dejan Manaskov	26 August 1992 (aged 27)	1.91 m	69	268	(Hungary) Telekom Veszprém
4	RB	Martin Velkovski	10 March 1997 (aged 22)	1.90 m	3	6	(North Macedonia) Eurofarm Rabotnik
5	P	Stojanče Stoilov	30 April 1987 (aged 32)	1.91 m	64	133	(North Macedonia) Vardar
7	RB	Kiril Lazarov	10 May 1980 (aged 39)	1.93 m	204	1431	(France) HBC Nantes
11	LB	Filip Taleski	28 March 1996 (aged 23)	2.00 m	40	101	(Germany) HBW Balingen-Weilstetten
16	GK	Borko Ristovski	2 November 1982 (aged 37)	1.90 m	152	5	(Portugal) S.L. Benfica
17	P	Nikola Markoski	22 May 1990 (aged 29)	1.95 m	14	12	(North Macedonia) Eurofarm Rabotnik
18	LB	Filip Kuzmanovski	3 July 1996 (aged 23)	1.98 m	35	56	(Germany) SC Magdeburg
21	CB	Mario Tankoski	28 August 1998 (aged 21)	1.92 m	9	3	(North Macedonia) Metalurg Skopje
22	RW	Goce Georgievski	12 February 1987 (aged 32)	1.85 m	76	149	(Romania) CSM București
25	CB	Goran Krstevski	29 March 1996 (aged 23)	1.96 m	6	1	(Austria) HC Linz AG
28	RW	Martin Popovski	26 August 1994 (aged 25)	1.77 m	23	16	(North Macedonia) Tineks Prolet
33	P	Žarko Peševski	11 April 1991 (aged 28)	1.95 m	36	65	(Germany) TVB 1898 Stuttgart
66	LW	Bojan Madzovski	8 May 1994 (aged 25)	1.84 m	3	7	(North Macedonia) Eurofarm Rabotnik
97	CB	Marko Miševski	23 August 1999 (aged 20)	1.99 m	0	0	(France) Grenoble St-Martin-d'Hères MIH

=== Ukraine ===
The squad was announced on 28 December 2019.

Head coach: Serhiy Bebeshko

No.	Pos.	Name	Date of birth (age)	Height	App.	Goals	Club
1	GK	Anton Terekhov	28 July 1992 (aged 27)	1.94 m	8	0	(Poland) Pogoń Szczecin
4	LB	Yevhen Buinenko	20 September 1992 (aged 27)	2.00 m	27	23	(Hungary) Orosházi FKSE
5	RW	Andrii Akimenko	12 June 1994 (aged 25)	1.90 m	32	67	(Ukraine) ZTR Zaporizhia
10	P	Olexandr Shevelev	2 December 1987 (aged 32)	2.00 m	45	98	(North Macedonia) Eurofarm Rabotnik
11	LW	Zakhar Denysov	1 March 1990 (aged 29)	1.87 m	38	78	(Ukraine) Motor Zaporizhia
13	CB	Vladyslav Zalevskyi	19 September 1998 (aged 21)	1.85 m	4	0	(Ukraine) ZTR Zaporizhia
14	P	Dmytro Doroshchuk	29 September 1986 (aged 33)	2.02 m	43	95	(Ukraine) Motor Zaporizhia
15	CB	Oleksandr Tilte	10 April 1995 (aged 24)	1.98 m	48	97	(Ukraine) ZTR Zaporizhia
17	LB	Dmytro Horiha	8 October 1997 (aged 22)	1.96 m	18	35	(Poland) Pogoń Szczecin
20	RW	Artem Kozakevych	2 October 1992 (aged 27)	1.82 m	37	81	(Ukraine) Motor Zaporizhia
21	LW	Yevhen Zhuk	4 August 1990 (aged 29)	1.87 m	48	92	(Russia) Permskie Medvedi
22	RB	Roman Chychykalo	3 July 1992 (aged 27)	1.92 m	28	19	(Poland) Zagłębie Lubin
25	P	Pavlo Gurkovsky	9 October 1985 (aged 34)	1.96 m	29	63	(Ukraine) Motor Zaporizhia
26	LB	Stanislav Zhukov	26 March 1992 (aged 27)	2.00 m	37	91	(Ukraine) Motor Zaporizhia
32	LB	Vladyslav Ostroushko	5 March 1986 (aged 33)	2.01 m	46	111	(North Macedonia) Eurofarm Rabotnik
55	GK	Gennadiy Komok	5 July 1987 (aged 32)	1.97 m	44	2	(Ukraine) Motor Zaporizhia
77	P	Dmytro Ilchenko	9 July 1996 (aged 23)	1.98 m	15	32	(Ukraine) ZTR Zaporizhia

== Group C ==
=== Germany ===
A 17-player squad was announced on 20 December 2019. Franz Semper withdrew on 31 December 2019, due to an injury and was replaced by David Schmidt. The final squad was announced on 8 January 2020. Johannes Golla replaced Marian Michalczik on 16 January 2020.

Head coach: Christian Prokop

No.	Pos.	Name	Date of birth (age)	Height	App.	Goals	Club
1	GK	Johannes Bitter	2 September 1982 (aged 37)	2.05 m	145	0	(Germany) TVB 1898 Stuttgart
3	LW	Uwe Gensheimer	26 October 1986 (aged 33)	1.88 m	176	1021	(Germany) Rhein-Neckar Löwen
4	P	Johannes Golla	5 November 1997 (aged 22)	1.95 m	6	14	(Germany) SG Flensburg-Handewitt
7	P	Patrick Wiencek	22 March 1989 (aged 30)	2.01 m	137	291	(Germany) THW Kiel
9	RW	Tobias Reichmann	27 August 1988 (aged 31)	1.88 m	83	249	(Germany) MT Melsungen
13	P	Hendrik Pekeler	2 July 1991 (aged 28)	2.03 m	101	167	(Germany) THW Kiel
20	LB	Philipp Weber	15 September 1992 (aged 27)	1.94 m	22	68	(Germany) SC DHfK Leipzig
22	CB	Marian Michalczik	1 February 1997 (aged 22)	1.99 m	14	18	(Germany) GWD Minden
25	RB	Kai Häfner	10 July 1989 (aged 30)	1.92 m	81	175	(Germany) MT Melsungen
33	GK	Andreas Wolff	3 March 1991 (aged 28)	1.98 m	91	10	(Poland) PGE Vive Kielce
35	LB	Julius Kühn	1 April 1993 (aged 26)	1.98 m	53	170	(Germany) MT Melsungen
38	LB	Fabian Böhm	24 June 1989 (aged 30)	1.98 m	32	73	(Germany) TSV Hannover-Burgdorf
48	P	Jannik Kohlbacher	19 July 1995 (aged 24)	1.93 m	65	129	(Germany) Rhein-Neckar Löwen
73	RW	Timo Kastening	25 June 1995 (aged 24)	1.80 m	6	16	(Germany) TSV Hannover-Burgdorf
77	RB	David Schmidt	19 October 1993 (aged 26)	1.90 m	1	1	(Germany) TVB 1898 Stuttgart
93	LW	Patrick Zieker	13 December 1993 (aged 26)	1.86 m	4	6	(Germany) TVB 1898 Stuttgart
95	CB	Paul Drux	7 February 1995 (aged 24)	1.92 m	82	162	(Germany) Füchse Berlin

=== Latvia ===
The squad was announced on 30 December 2019.

Head coach: Armands Uščins

No.	Pos.	Name	Date of birth (age)	Height	App.	Goals	Club
5	CB	Māris Veršakovs	13 January 1986 (aged 33)	1.92 m	90	242	(Latvia) Tenax Dobele
6	RW	Uvis Stazdiņš	5 October 1999 (aged 20)	1.80 m	13	18	(Estonia) HC Kehra
7	LB	Aivis Jurdžs	24 August 1983 (aged 36)	1.97 m	84	319	(Latvia) Tenax Dobele
10	RB	Dainis Krištopāns	27 September 1990 (aged 29)	2.14 m	74	325	(North Macedonia) Vardar
12	GK	Edgars Kukša	26 January 1990 (aged 29)	1.91 m	77	0	(Germany) OHV Aurich
14	LW	Oskars Arājs	4 August 1990 (aged 29)	1.88 m	39	43	(Latvia) Tenax Dobele
16	GK	Raitis Puriņš	20 May 1988 (aged 31)	1.90 m	38	0	(Latvia) Celtnieks Rīga
17	LB	Nils Kreicbergs	23 May 1996 (aged 23)	1.92 m	45	80	(Finland) Riihimäki Cocks
19	RW	Andis Ērmanis	21 May 1990 (aged 29)	1.68 m	51	16	(Latvia) Tenax Dobele
27	P	Ingars Dude	1 January 1987 (aged 33)	1.95 m	70	143	(France) Limoges Hand 87
33	RB	Ģirts Lilienfelds	4 December 1982 (aged 37)	1.89 m	81	214	(Germany) HSC 2000 Coburg
35	P	Egils Politers	18 February 1990 (aged 29)	1.95 m	38	52	(Latvia) Tenax Dobele
44	RB	Evars Klešniks	18 May 1980 (aged 39)	1.99 m	70	241	(Germany) LiT Tribe Germania
71	LW	Rihards Leja	28 July 1992 (aged 27)	1.87 m	24	29	(Latvia) Celtnieks Rīga
76	CB	Austris Tuminskis	7 June 1990 (aged 29)	1.98 m	55	119	(Germany) EHV Aue
77	RW	Jānis Pavlovičs	16 September 1984 (aged 35)	1.84 m	98	297	(Norway) Sandefjord TIF

=== Netherlands ===
A 16-player squad was announced on 28 November 2019. The final squad was announced on 5 January 2020.

Head coach: (Iceland) Erlingur Richardsson

No.	Pos.	Name	Date of birth (age)	Height	App.	Goals	Club
1	GK	Bart Ravensbergen	14 March 1993 (aged 26)	1.89 m	56	6	(Germany) HSG Nordhorn-Lingen
7	P	Toon Leenders	17 April 1986 (aged 33)	2.02 m	96	158	(Germany) HSG Nordhorn-Lingen
11	RB	Iso Sluijters	24 July 1990 (aged 29)	1.92 m	71	159	(Poland) Górnik Zabrze
12	CB	Luc Steins	22 March 1995 (aged 24)	1.72 m	59	169	(France) Fenix Toulouse Handball
13	P	Samir Benghanem	10 December 1993 (aged 26)	1.95 m	21	13	(Netherlands) Green Park/Aalsmeer
14	RW	Bobby Schagen	13 January 1990 (aged 29)	1.92 m	83	288	(Germany) TBV Lemgo
17	P	Ivo Steins	18 July 1992 (aged 27)	1.79 m	56	81	(Netherlands) OCI-LIONS
19	LB	Robin Schoenaker	23 August 1995 (aged 24)	1.97 m	6	0	(Belgium) Sporting NeLo
20	RB	Niels Versteijnen	3 February 2000 (aged 19)	2.00 m	4	5	(Germany) SG Flensburg-Handewitt
21	RB	Kay Smits	31 March 1997 (aged 22)	1.85 m	39	96	(Denmark) TTH Holstebro
22	LB	Jasper Adams	3 July 1989 (aged 30)	2.00 m	78	193	(Netherlands) OCI-LIONS
24	LW	Jeffrey Boomhouwer	15 June 1988 (aged 31)	1.80 m	73	191	(Germany) Bergischer HC
25	LB	Ephrahim Jerry	27 May 1996 (aged 23)	1.96 m	32	82	(Belgium) Sporting NeLo
31	GK	Gerrie Eijlers	9 May 1980 (aged 39)	1.93 m	114	4	(Netherlands) KRAS/Volendam
77	CB	Dani Baijens	5 May 1998 (aged 21)	1.82 m	29	47	(Germany) TBV Lemgo
85	LW	Tim Remer	29 July 1985 (aged 34)	1.96 m	88	218	(Netherlands) JD Techniek Hurry-Up

=== Spain ===
An 18-player squad was announced on 30 December 2019. The final squad was announced on 5 January 2020.

Head coach: Jordi Ribera

No.	Pos.	Name	Date of birth (age)	Height	App.	Goals	Club
1	GK	Gonzalo Pérez de Vargas	10 January 1991 (aged 28)	1.90 m	103	8	(Spain) FC Barcelona
5	RB	Jorge Maqueda	6 February 1988 (aged 31)	1.97 m	130	311	(Hungary) MOL-Pick Szeged
6	LW	Ángel Fernández	16 September 1988 (aged 31)	1.92 m	52	140	(Poland) PGE Vive Kielce
9	CB	Raúl Entrerríos	12 February 1981 (aged 38)	1.95 m	260	587	(Spain) FC Barcelona
10	RB	Alex Dujshebaev	17 December 1992 (aged 27)	1.87 m	90	218	(Poland) PGE Vive Kielce
11	CB	Daniel Sarmiento	25 August 1983 (aged 36)	1.88 m	111	225	(France) Saint-Raphaël Var Handball
12	GK	Rodrigo Corrales	24 January 1991 (aged 28)	2.02 m	63	2	(France) Paris Saint-Germain
13	P	Julen Aguinagalde	8 December 1982 (aged 37)	1.96 m	188	453	(Poland) PGE Vive Kielce
14	RW	Ferrán Solé	25 August 1992 (aged 27)	1.92 m	41	180	(France) Fenix Toulouse Handball
15	LB	Iosu Goñi Leoz	4 January 1990 (aged 30)	1.97 m	54	82	(France) Pays d'Aix UC
17	P	Adrià Figueras	8 December 1988 (aged 31)	1.92 m	57	136	(Spain) BM Granollers
21	LB	Joan Cañellas	30 September 1986 (aged 33)	1.98 m	179	456	(Hungary) MOL-Pick Szeged
24	LB	Viran Morros	15 December 1983 (aged 36)	1.99 m	219	161	(France) Paris Saint-Germain
28	RW	Aleix Gómez	7 May 1997 (aged 22)	1.83 m	26	75	(Spain) FC Barcelona
29	LW	Aitor Ariño	5 October 1992 (aged 27)	1.87 m	53	104	(Spain) FC Barcelona
30	P	Gedeón Guardiola	1 October 1984 (aged 35)	2.00 m	138	166	(Germany) Rhein-Neckar Löwen
59	CB	Daniel Dujshebaev	4 July 1997 (aged 22)	1.93 m	35	58	(Poland) PGE Vive Kielce

== Group D ==
=== Bosnia and Herzegovina ===
A 28-player squad was revealed on 6 December 2019. The final squad was announced on 7 January 2020.

Head coach: Bilal Šuman

No.	Pos.	Name	Date of birth (age)	Height	App.	Goals	Club
1	GK	Nebojša Grahovac	11 February 1984 (aged 35)	1.91 m	83	1	(France) C' Chartres Métropole Handball
3	LW	Alen Ovčina	27 February 1989 (aged 30)	1.89 m	53	140	(Serbia) Vojvodina
4	CB	Josip Perić	5 June 1992 (aged 27)	1.80 m	39	45	(Germany) Frisch Auf Göppingen
5	LB	Mirko Herceg	26 February 1992 (aged 27)	1.95 m	4	6	(Hungary) Gyöngyösi KK
8	P	Senjamin Burić	20 November 1990 (aged 29)	1.98 m	71	169	(France) HBC Nantes
10	RB	Marko Panić	10 March 1991 (aged 28)	1.97 m	68	174	(Belarus) Meshkov Brest
11	LB	Igor Mandić	16 October 1991 (aged 28)	1.96 m	7	4	(France) Limoges Hand 87
12	GK	Benjamin Burić	20 November 1990 (aged 29)	1.97 m	72	1	(Germany) SG Flensburg-Handewitt
13	RW	Ibrahim Haseljić	14 January 1998 (aged 21)	1.92 m	7	20	(Slovenia) Gorenje Velenje
14	CB	Mirsad Terzić	12 July 1983 (aged 36)	1.96 m	168	469	(Hungary) Telekom Veszprém
15	P	Muhamed Toromanović	9 April 1984 (aged 35)	1.90 m	135	425	(Bosnia and Herzegovina) Bosna Visoko
18	CB	Ivan Karačić	26 May 1985 (aged 34)	1.90 m	68	150	(Israel) Maccabi Rishon LeZion
19	LB	Nikola Prce	31 August 1980 (aged 39)	2.01 m	108	402	(Kosovo) KH BESA FamGas
21	P	Vladimir Vranješ	14 December 1988 (aged 31)	2.00 m	72	119	(Hungary) Grundfos Tatabánya
22	RB	Dejan Malinović	12 April 1992 (aged 27)	1.95 m	54	146	(Romania) HC Dobrogea Sud Constanța
23	LW	Dino Hamidović	11 July 1996 (aged 23)	1.95 m	5	10	(Slovenia) Trimo Trebnje
28	RW	Srđan Predragović	4 July 1995 (aged 24)	1.93 m	10	22	(Switzerland) RTV 1879 Basel
29	LB	Marin Vegar	22 January 1990 (aged 29)	1.99 m	12	64	(North Macedonia) Eurofarm Rabotnik

=== France ===
An 18-player squad was revealed on 30 December 2019. The final squad was announced on 6 January 2020.

Head coach: Didier Dinart

No.	Pos.	Name	Date of birth (age)	Height	App.	Goals	Club
5	RB	Nedim Remili	18 July 1995 (aged 24)	1.95 m	67	212	(France) Paris Saint-Germain
7	CB	Romain Lagarde	5 March 1997 (aged 22)	1.94 m	36	47	(Germany) Rhein-Neckar Löwen
8	LB	Elohim Prandi	24 August 1998 (aged 21)	1.93 m	4	15	(France) USAM Nîmes Gard
9	CB	Melvyn Richardson	30 January 1997 (aged 22)	1.90 m	19	54	(France) Montpellier Handball
10	RB	Dika Mem	31 August 1997 (aged 22)	1.94 m	49	126	(Spain) FC Barcelona
11	P	Nicolas Tournat	5 April 1994 (aged 25)	2.00 m	28	28	(France) HBC Nantes
12	GK	Vincent Gérard	16 December 1986 (aged 33)	1.89 m	94	12	(France) Paris Saint-Germain
13	LB	Nikola Karabatić	11 April 1984 (aged 35)	1.96 m	310	1202	(France) Paris Saint-Germain
15	LW	Mathieu Grébille	6 October 1991 (aged 28)	1.98 m	74	118	(France) Montpellier Handball
16	GK	Yann Genty	26 December 1981 (aged 38)	1.85 m	5	0	(France) Chambéry Savoie Mont-Blanc HB
19	RW	Luc Abalo	6 September 1984 (aged 35)	1.82 m	259	797	(France) Paris Saint-Germain
20	P	Cédric Sorhaindo	7 June 1984 (aged 35)	1.92 m	217	424	(Spain) FC Barcelona
21	LW	Michaël Guigou	28 January 1982 (aged 37)	1.80 m	280	957	(France) USAM Nîmes Gard
23	P	Ludovic Fabregas	1 July 1996 (aged 23)	1.98 m	69	117	(Spain) FC Barcelona
24	GK	Wesley Pardin	1 January 1990 (aged 30)	1.95 m	13	0	(France) Pays d’Aix UC
26	CB	Nicolas Claire	10 July 1987 (aged 32)	1.90 m	42	45	(France) Pays d’Aix UC
27	RB	Adrien Dipanda	3 May 1988 (aged 31)	2.02 m	74	90	(France) Saint-Raphaël Var Handball
28	RW	Valentin Porte	7 September 1990 (aged 29)	1.90 m	121	305	(France) Montpellier Handball

=== Norway ===
An 18-player squad was announced on 9 December 2019. On 25 December 2019, Bjarte Myrhol was replaced by Tom Kåre Nikolaisen due to a health problem. The final squad was announced on 10 January 2020. On 20 January, Espen Christensen replaced Magnus Abelvik Rød due to an injury. On 22 January, William Aar replaced Kristian Sæverås due to sickness.

Head coach: Christian Berge

No.	Pos.	Name	Date of birth (age)	Height	App.	Goals	Club
2	P	Tom Kåre Nikolaisen	29 December 1997 (aged 22)	1.96 m	4	1	(Norway) Kolstad Håndball
5	CB	Sander Sagosen	14 September 1995 (aged 24)	1.95 m	96	433	(France) Paris Saint-Germain
7	CB	Sander Andreassen Øverjordet	8 April 1996 (aged 23)	1.90 m	4	3	(Norway) Haslum HK
11	P	Petter Øverby	26 March 1992 (aged 27)	1.95 m	61	27	(Germany) HC Erlangen
12	GK	Kristian Sæverås	22 June 1996 (aged 23)	1.97 m	11	1	(Denmark) Aalborg Håndbold
16	GK	Espen Christensen	17 June 1985 (aged 34)	1.85 m	105	2	(Germany) GWD Minden
17	LW	Magnus Jøndal	7 February 1988 (aged 31)	1.81 m	146	453	(Germany) SG Flensburg-Handewitt
18	LB	William Aar	23 October 1997 (aged 22)	1.95 m	8	5	(Norway) Kolstad Håndball
19	RW	Kristian Bjørnsen	10 January 1989 (aged 30)	1.92 m	116	501	(Germany) HSG Wetzlar
21	P	Magnus Gullerud	13 November 1991 (aged 28)	1.93 m	124	141	(Germany) GWD Minden
23	LB	Gøran Johannessen	26 April 1994 (aged 25)	1.93 m	62	123	(Germany) SG Flensburg-Handewitt
24	CB	Christian O'Sullivan	22 August 1991 (aged 28)	1.90 m	113	172	(Germany) SC Magdeburg
25	RB	Eivind Tangen	4 May 1993 (aged 26)	1.95 m	83	140	(Denmark) Skjern Håndbold
27	RB	Harald Reinkind	17 August 1992 (aged 27)	1.96 m	97	178	(Germany) THW Kiel
30	GK	Torbjørn Bergerud	16 July 1994 (aged 25)	2.00 m	75	0	(Germany) SG Flensburg-Handewitt
44	RW	Kevin Gulliksen	9 November 1996 (aged 23)	1.79 m	25	33	(Germany) GWD Minden
71	LW	Alexander Blonz	17 April 2000 (aged 19)	1.85 m	19	38	(Norway) Elverum Håndball
77	RB	Magnus Abelvik Rød	7 July 1997 (aged 22)	2.03 m	47	96	(Germany) SG Flensburg-Handewitt

=== Portugal ===
The squad was announced on 30 December 2019.

Head coach: Paulo Pereira

No.	Pos.	Name	Date of birth (age)	Height	App.	Goals	Club
1	GK	Alfredo Quintana	20 March 1988 (aged 31)	2.01 m	48	6	(Portugal) FC Porto
4	RW	Pedro Portela	6 January 1990 (aged 30)	1.86 m	80	266	Tremblay-en-France Handball
9	RB	João Ferraz	8 January 1990 (aged 30)	1.96 m	69	131	(Switzerland) HSC Suhr Aarau
10	CB	Miguel Martins	4 November 1997 (aged 22)	1.92 m	35	69	(Portugal) FC Porto
11	RB	Belone Moreira	1 June 1990 (aged 29)	1.80 m	9	8	(Portugal) S.L. Benfica
14	CB	Rui Silva	28 April 1993 (aged 26)	1.86 m	70	109	(Portugal) FC Porto
15	P	Daymaro Salina	1 September 1987 (aged 32)	2.00 m	36	61	(Portugal) FC Porto
16	GK	Humberto Gomes	1 January 1978 (aged 42)	1.93 m	67	0	(Portugal) ABC Braga
17	P	Tiago Rocha	17 October 1985 (aged 34)	1.96 m	132	353	(Portugal) Sporting CP
22	P	Alexis Borges	6 October 1991 (aged 28)	1.96 m	22	34	(Portugal) FC Porto
23	LW	Diogo Branquinho	25 July 1994 (aged 25)	1.80 m	32	70	(Portugal) FC Porto
24	LB	Alexandre Cavalcanti	27 December 1996 (aged 23)	2.03 m	29	24	(France) HBC Nantes
25	RW	António Areia	21 June 1990 (aged 29)	1.90 m	35	93	(Portugal) FC Porto
27	LB	André Gomes	27 July 1998 (aged 21)	1.92 m	11	16	(Portugal) FC Porto
34	LW	Fábio Vidrago	28 October 1988 (aged 31)	1.80 m	45	107	(Portugal) S.L. Benfica
41	GK	Gustavo Capdeville	31 August 1997 (aged 22)	1.89 m	5	0	(Portugal) S.L. Benfica
82	P	Luís Frade	11 September 1998 (aged 21)	1.94 m	11	14	(Portugal) Sporting CP
88	LB	Fábio Magalhães	12 March 1988 (aged 31)	1.94 m	129	273	(Portugal) FC Porto

== Group E ==
=== Denmark ===
The squad was announced on 16 December 2019. On 13 January Morten Olsen replaced Jacob Holm. On 15 January Magnus Landin Jacobsen replaced Lasse Andersson

Head coach: Nikolaj Jacobsen

No.	Pos.	Name	Date of birth (age)	Height	App.	Goals	Club
1	GK	Niklas Landin Jacobsen	19 December 1988 (aged 31)	2.01 m	204	9	(Germany) THW Kiel
3	RB	Niclas Kirkeløkke	26 March 1994 (aged 25)	1.95 m	34	50	(Germany) Rhein-Neckar Löwen
4	LW	Magnus Landin Jacobsen	20 August 1995 (aged 24)	1.96 m	59	121	(Germany) THW Kiel
5	LW	Magnus Bramming	1 October 1990 (aged 29)	1.82 m	10	23	(Denmark) TTH Holstebro
11	CB	Rasmus Lauge Schmidt	20 June 1991 (aged 28)	1.93 m	121	292	(Hungary) Telekom Veszprém
14	P	Anders Zachariassen	4 September 1991 (aged 28)	1.92 m	43	101	(Germany) SG Flensburg-Handewitt
15	P	Magnus Saugstrup	12 July 1996 (aged 23)	1.95 m	10	14	(Denmark) Aalborg Håndbold
16	GK	Jannick Green	30 September 1988 (aged 31)	1.95 m	131	2	(Germany) SC Magdeburg
18	RW	Hans Lindberg	1 August 1981 (aged 38)	1.88 m	267	744	(Germany) Füchse Berlin
19	P	René Toft Hansen	1 November 1984 (aged 35)	2.00 m	144	205	(Portugal) S.L. Benfica
21	LB	Henrik Møllgaard	2 January 1985 (aged 35)	1.96 m	152	168	(Denmark) Aalborg Håndbold
22	CB	Mads Mensah Larsen	12 August 1991 (aged 28)	1.88 m	128	238	(Germany) Rhein-Neckar Löwen
24	LB	Mikkel Hansen	22 October 1987 (aged 32)	1.92 m	206	1004	(France) Paris Saint-Germain
25	CB	Morten Olsen	11 October 1984 (aged 35)	1.84 m	95	202	(Germany) TSV Hannover-Burgdorf
26	RW	Jóhan Hansen	1 May 1994 (aged 25)	1.90 m	27	52	(Denmark) Bjerringbro-Silkeborg
27	LB	Michael Damgaard	18 March 1990 (aged 29)	1.92 m	75	187	(Germany) SC Magdeburg
28	LB	Lasse Andersson	11 March 1994 (aged 25)	1.90 m	25	32	(Spain) FC Barcelona
32	CB	Jacob Holm	5 September 1995 (aged 24)	1.94 m	22	50	(Germany) Füchse Berlin

=== Hungary ===
A 22-player squad was announced on 13 December 2019. On 2 January 2020 the squad was reduced to 20 players. The final squad was announced on 5 January 2020.

Head coach: István Gulyás

No.	Pos.	Name	Date of birth (age)	Height	App.	Goals	Club
2	P	Adrián Sipos	8 March 1990 (aged 29)	1.98 m	21	19	(Hungary) Grundfos Tatabánya
9	RB	Zsolt Balogh	29 March 1989 (aged 30)	1.89 m	56	173	(Hungary) Grundfos Tatabánya
11	LB	Patrik Ligetvári	13 February 1996 (aged 23)	2.01 m	43	35	(Spain) BM Logroño La Rioja
12	GK	Márton Székely	2 January 1990 (aged 30)	1.95 m	42	0	(Hungary) Telekom Veszprém
13	LW	Bendegúz Bóka	2 October 1993 (aged 26)	1.95 m	26	58	(Hungary) Balatonfüredi KSE
15	CB	Mátyás Győri	2 February 1997 (aged 22)	1.94 m	7	16	(Hungary) Grundfos Tatabánya
16	GK	Roland Mikler	20 September 1984 (aged 35)	1.90 m	200	0	(Hungary) MOL-Pick Szeged
17	LB	Bence Nagy	5 July 1995 (aged 24)	1.95 m	1	2	(Hungary) Ferencvárosi TC
20	P	Miklós Rosta	14 February 1999 (aged 20)	2.03 m	5	10	(Hungary) MOL-Pick Szeged
23	RB	Dominik Máthé	1 April 1999 (aged 20)	2.01 m	11	18	(Hungary) Balatonfüredi KSE
27	P	Bence Bánhidi	9 February 1995 (aged 24)	2.04 m	66	165	(Hungary) MOL-Pick Szeged
30	LB	Zoltán Szita	10 February 1998 (aged 21)	1.96 m	12	21	(Poland) Orlen Wisła Płock
37	RB	Donát Bartók	13 July 1996 (aged 23)	1.91 m	10	21	(Germany) TBV Lemgo
38	RB	Bálint Fekete	27 June 1995 (aged 24)	1.94 m	2	2	(Spain) Liberbank Cuenca
45	CB	Dávid Ubornyák	8 September 1998 (aged 21)	1.86 m	2	0	(Hungary) Gyöngyösi KK
47	RW	Péter Hornyák	4 October 1995 (aged 24)	1.78 m	38	60	(Hungary) Grundfos Tatabánya
49	RW	Ádám Tóth	18 October 1995 (aged 24)	1.77 m	3	2	(Hungary) CYEB Budakalász

=== Iceland ===
A 19-player squad was announced on 16 December 2019. The final squad was announced on 7 January 2020.

Head coach: Guðmundur Guðmundsson

No.	Pos.	Name	Date of birth (age)	Height	App.	Goals	Club
1	GK	Björgvin Páll Gústavsson	24 May 1985 (aged 34)	1.93 m	221	13	(Denmark) Skjern Håndbold
3	P	Kári Kristjánsson	28 October 1984 (aged 35)	1.92 m	137	162	(Iceland) ÍBV
4	LB	Aron Pálmarsson	19 July 1990 (aged 29)	1.93 m	141	553	(Spain) FC Barcelona
8	LW	Bjarki Már Elísson	16 May 1990 (aged 29)	1.91 m	63	141	(Germany) TBV Lemgo
9	LW	Guðjón Valur Sigurðsson	8 August 1979 (aged 40)	1.87 m	356	1853	(France) Paris Saint-Germain
11	P	Ýmir Örn Gíslason	1 July 1997 (aged 22)	1.92 m	33	14	(Iceland) Valur
13	LB	Ólafur Guðmundsson	13 May 1990 (aged 29)	1.94 m	115	215	(Sweden) IFK Kristianstad
15	RB	Alexander Petersson	2 July 1980 (aged 39)	1.88 m	173	694	(Germany) Rhein-Neckar Löwen
16	GK	Viktor Gísli Hallgrímsson	24 July 2000 (aged 19)	2.03 m	9	0	(Denmark) GOG Håndbold
17	RW	Arnór Þór Gunnarsson	23 October 1987 (aged 32)	1.81 m	105	311	(Germany) Bergischer HC
21	P	Arnar Freyr Arnarsson	14 March 1996 (aged 23)	2.01 m	45	65	(Denmark) GOG Håndbold
22	RW	Sigvaldi Guðjónsson	4 July 1994 (aged 25)	1.91 m	20	37	(Norway) Elverum Håndball
24	CB	Haukur Þrastarson	14 April 2001 (aged 18)	1.92 m	12	15	(Iceland) Selfoss
25	CB	Elvar Örn Jónsson	31 August 1997 (aged 22)	1.85 m	26	80	(Denmark) Skjern Håndbold
28	RB	Viggó Kristjánsson	9 December 1993 (aged 26)	1.87 m	2	3	(Germany) HSG Wetzlar
29	P	Sveinn Jóhannsson	16 June 1999 (aged 20)	1.96 m	7	14	(Denmark) SønderjyskE Håndbold
33	CB	Janus Daði Smárason	1 January 1995 (aged 25)	1.84 m	37	41	(Denmark) Aalborg Håndbold

=== Russia ===
A 22-player squad was announced on 24 December 2019. On 1 January 2020 the squad was reduced to 18 players.

Head coach: Eduard Koksharov

No.	Pos.	Name	Date of birth (age)	Height	App.	Goals	Club
1	GK	Oleg Grams	20 February 1984 (aged 35)	2.00 m	150	0	(France) Dunkerque Handball
2	GK	Denis Zabolotin	18 June 1998 (aged 21)	1.90 m	4	0	(Russia) SKIF Krasnodar
3	LB	Dmitrii Santalov	7 April 1996 (aged 23)	1.96 m	19	46	(Russia) Chekhovskiye Medvedi
6	RW	Daniil Shishkarev	6 July 1988 (aged 31)	1.90 m	121	303	(North Macedonia) Vardar
7	RW	Dmitry Kovalyov	15 May 1982 (aged 37)	1.80 m	213	552	(Russia) HC Spartak
9	LB	Alexander Shkurinskiy	11 April 1995 (aged 24)	1.93 m	38	80	(Belarus) Meshkov Brest
13	LB	Sergei Gorbok	4 December 1982 (aged 37)	1.95 m	82	243	(North Macedonia) Vardar
19	CB	Pavel Atman	25 May 1987 (aged 32)	1.93 m	118	234	(North Macedonia) Vardar
21	P	Gleb Kalarash	29 November 1990 (aged 29)	2.05 m	65	106	(North Macedonia) Vardar
24	RW	Dmitry Kornev	16 June 1992 (aged 27)	1.86 m	3	3	(Russia) Chekhovskiye Medvedi
31	LW	Timur Dibirov	30 July 1983 (aged 36)	1.80 m	212	743	(North Macedonia) Vardar
44	LW	Igor Soroka	27 May 1991 (aged 28)	1.80 m	47	125	(Ukraine) Motor Zaporizhia
47	RB	Alexander Kotov	11 July 1994 (aged 25)	1.98 m	11	7	(Russia) Chekhovskiye Medvedi
55	P	Aleksandr Ermakov	14 January 1996 (aged 23)	1.95 m	0	0	(Russia) Dinamo Astrakhan
78	P	Pavel Andreev	19 July 1992 (aged 27)	1.95 m	0	0	(Russia) Chekhovskiye Medvedi
87	GK	Victor Kireev	5 May 1987 (aged 32)	1.90 m	60	0	(Ukraine) Motor Zaporizhia
89	CB	Dmitry Zhitnikov	20 November 1989 (aged 30)	1.95 m	122	314	(Hungary) MOL-Pick Szeged
99	LB	Sergei Kosorotov	16 June 1999 (aged 20)	1.95 m	15	30	(Russia) Chekhovskiye Medvedi

== Group F ==
=== Poland ===
A 19-player squad was announced on 31 December 2019. The final squad was announced on 6 January 2020. On 14 January Jan Czuwara replaced Przemysław Krajewski due to an injury.

Head coach: Patryk Rombel

No.	Pos.	Name	Date of birth (age)	Height	App.	Goals	Club
1	GK	Mateusz Kornecki	5 June 1994 (aged 25)	1.94 m	34	3	(Poland) PGE Vive Kielce
4	CB	Michał Olejniczak	31 January 2001 (aged 18)	1.93 m	14	11	(Poland) SMS Gdańsk
6	LW	Przemysław Krajewski	20 January 1987 (aged 32)	1.84 m	127	289	(Poland) Orlen Wisła Płock
9	LB	Szymon Sićko	20 August 1997 (aged 22)	2.00 m	15	17	(Poland) Górnik Zabrze
11	RB	Maciej Majdziński	8 April 1996 (aged 23)	1.89 m	5	5	(Germany) Bergischer HC
17	LB	Antoni Łangowski	19 April 1990 (aged 29)	1.95 m	28	56	(Poland) Azoty-Puławy
19	LW	Jan Czuwara	18 October 1995 (aged 24)	1.84 m	21	38	(Poland) Górnik Zabrze
20	CB	Maciej Pilitowski	27 October 1990 (aged 29)	1.86 m	17	18	(Poland) MKS Kalisz
21	P	Kamil Syprzak	23 July 1991 (aged 28)	2.06 m	137	267	(France) Paris Saint-Germain
23	RW	Arkadiusz Moryto	31 August 1997 (aged 22)	1.80 m	52	220	(Poland) PGE Vive Kielce
25	LW	Piotr Jarosiewicz	28 June 1998 (aged 21)	1.78 m	17	30	(Poland) Azoty-Puławy
27	CB	Adrian Kondratiuk	23 February 1993 (aged 26)	1.85 m	24	33	(Poland) Górnik Zabrze
28	P	Maciej Gębala	10 January 1994 (aged 25)	2.00 m	53	38	(Germany) SC DHfK Leipzig
30	RB	Rafał Przybylski	19 February 1991 (aged 28)	2.00 m	63	129	(Poland) Azoty-Puławy
34	RW	Krystian Bondzior	24 April 1999 (aged 20)	1.82 m	6	5	(Poland) Górnik Zabrze
36	P	Dawid Dawydzik	17 December 1994 (aged 25)	2.00 m	11	16	(Poland) Azoty-Puławy
49	LB	Piotr Chrapkowski	24 March 1988 (aged 31)	2.03 m	111	167	(Germany) SC Magdeburg
94	GK	Adam Morawski	17 October 1994 (aged 25)	1.90 m	40	2	(Poland) Orlen Wisła Płock

=== Slovenia ===
A 20-player squad was announced on 29 December 2019. The final squad was announced on 5 January 2020.

Head coach: (Sweden) Ljubomir Vranjes

No.	Pos.	Name	Date of birth (age)	Height	App.	Goals	Club
3	P	Blaž Blagotinšek	17 January 1994 (aged 25)	2.02 m	78	120	(Hungary) Telekom Veszprém
5	LB	Nik Henigman	4 December 1995 (aged 24)	2.00 m	39	60	(Hungary) MOL-Pick Szeged
6	RW	Gašper Marguč	20 August 1990 (aged 29)	1.81 m	106	364	(Hungary) Telekom Veszprém
7	RB	Vid Kavtičnik	24 May 1984 (aged 35)	1.91 m	194	539	(France) Pays d’Aix UC
8	RW	Blaž Janc	20 November 1996 (aged 23)	1.87 m	54	176	(Poland) PGE Vive Kielce
11	RB	Jure Dolenec	6 December 1988 (aged 31)	1.91 m	135	476	(Spain) FC Barcelona
13	LW	Darko Cingesar	25 July 1990 (aged 29)	1.87 m	65	113	(France) Pays d’Aix UC
17	RB	Nejc Cehte	4 September 1992 (aged 27)	1.96 m	17	27	(Germany) TSV Hannover-Burgdorf
20	LW	Tilen Kodrin	14 May 1994 (aged 25)	1.92 m	34	53	(Slovenia) Celje Pivovarna Laško
23	CB	Miha Zarabec	12 October 1991 (aged 28)	1.77 m	54	126	(Germany) THW Kiel
24	RW	Mario Šoštarič	25 November 1992 (aged 27)	1.93 m	24	55	(Hungary) MOL-Pick Szeged
26	GK	Klemen Ferlin	26 June 1989 (aged 30)	1.91 m	27	0	(Slovenia) Celje Pivovarna Laško
27	P	Kristjan Horžen	8 December 1999 (aged 20)	1.92 m	0	0	(Slovenia) Celje Pivovarna Laško
33	P	Igor Žabič	15 August 1992 (aged 27)	2.01 m	23	32	(Poland) Orlen Wisła Płock
34	CB	Rok Ovniček	29 January 1995 (aged 24)	1.84 m	13	17	(France) HBC Nantes
44	CB	Dean Bombač	4 April 1989 (aged 30)	1.90 m	78	142	(Hungary) MOL-Pick Szeged
51	LB	Borut Mačkovšek	11 September 1992 (aged 27)	2.03 m	97	217	(Hungary) Telekom Veszprém
99	GK	Urh Kastelic	27 February 1996 (aged 23)	2.01 m	32	5	(Germany) Frisch Auf Göppingen

=== Sweden ===
The squad was announced on 13 December 2019.

Head coach: Kristján Andrésson

No.	Pos.	Name	Date of birth (age)	Height	App.	Goals	Club
5	P	Max Darj	27 September 1991 (aged 28)	1.92 m	54	25	(Germany) Bergischer HC
6	LB	Philip Henningsson	14 June 1995 (aged 24)	1.96 m	28	17	(Sweden) IFK Kristianstad
7	RB	Jack Thurin	9 June 1999 (aged 20)	1.99 m	7	14	(Sweden) IFK Skövde
9	LW	Jerry Tollbring	13 September 1995 (aged 24)	1.82 m	62	186	(Germany) Rhein-Neckar Löwen
11	RW	Daniel Pettersson	6 May 1992 (aged 27)	1.79 m	17	53	(Germany) SC Magdeburg
12	GK	Andreas Palicka	10 July 1986 (aged 33)	1.89 m	96	4	(Germany) Rhein-Neckar Löwen
17	LB	Simon Jeppsson	15 July 1995 (aged 24)	2.03 m	50	96	(Germany) SG Flensburg-Handewitt
18	P	Fredric Pettersson	11 February 1989 (aged 30)	2.01 m	51	75	(France) Montpellier Handball
20	GK	Mikael Appelgren	6 September 1989 (aged 30)	1.91 m	85	2	(Germany) Rhein-Neckar Löwen
22	LW	Lucas Pellas	28 August 1995 (aged 24)	1.84 m	4	12	(Sweden) Lugi HF
23	RB	Albin Lagergren	11 September 1992 (aged 27)	1.86 m	47	135	(Germany) SC Magdeburg
24	CB	Jim Gottfridsson	2 September 1992 (aged 27)	1.91 m	79	272	(Germany) SG Flensburg-Handewitt
25	CB	Linus Arnesson	11 May 1990 (aged 29)	1.88 m	33	38	(Germany) Bergischer HC
35	P	Andreas Nilsson	12 April 1990 (aged 29)	1.97 m	132	305	(Hungary) Telekom Veszprém
36	P	Jesper Nielsen	30 September 1989 (aged 30)	2.00 m	105	139	(Germany) Rhein-Neckar Löwen
60	LB	Kim Ekdahl du Rietz	23 July 1989 (aged 30)	1.94 m	88	250	(France) Paris Saint-Germain
62	RW	Valter Chrintz	26 April 2000 (aged 19)	1.85 m	4	11	(Sweden) IFK Kristianstad
65	LB	Lukas Nilsson	16 November 1996 (aged 23)	1.94 m	64	164	(Germany) THW Kiel

=== Switzerland ===
A 19-player squad was announced on 11 December 2019. The final squad was announced on 8 January 2020.

Head coach: Michael Suter

No.	Pos.	Name	Date of birth (age)	Height	App.	Goals	Club
2	CB	Andy Schmid	30 August 1983 (aged 36)	1.89 m	177	843	(Germany) Rhein-Neckar Löwen
3	P	Lucas Meister	16 August 1996 (aged 23)	1.96 m	44	117	(Germany) GWD Minden
4	LB	Lenny Rubin	1 February 1996 (aged 23)	2.05 m	31	105	(Germany) HSG Wetzlar
8	P	Michal Svajlen	12 April 1989 (aged 30)	1.96 m	81	104	(Switzerland) Pfadi Winterthur
9	LW	Marvin Lier	8 September 1992 (aged 27)	1.85 m	58	128	(Switzerland) Pfadi Winterthur
11	LB	Roman Sidorowicz	8 August 1991 (aged 28)	1.87 m	56	129	(Germany) MT Melsungen
14	CB	Lucas von Deschwanden	5 June 1989 (aged 30)	1.92 m	55	177	(France) Chambéry Savoie Mont-Blanc HB
15	RB	Nicolas Raemy	25 February 1992 (aged 27)	1.86 m	59	177	(Switzerland) Wacker Thun
16	GK	Nikola Portner	19 November 1993 (aged 26)	1.94 m	85	8	(France) Montpellier Handball
17	P	Samuel Röthlisberger	15 August 1996 (aged 23)	1.99 m	40	11	(Germany) TVB 1898 Stuttgart
18	RB	Dimitrij Küttel	18 February 1994 (aged 25)	1.92 m	54	120	(Switzerland) Kadetten Schaffhausen
20	LB	Luka Maros	20 March 1994 (aged 25)	1.96 m	42	100	(Switzerland) Kadetten Schaffhausen
24	RW	Nik Tominec	26 March 1991 (aged 28)	1.87 m	8	8	(Switzerland) Kadetten Schaffhausen
27	RW	Maximilian Gerbl	25 June 1995 (aged 24)	1.79 m	28	58	(Switzerland) Kadetten Schaffhausen
31	GK	Aurel Bringolf	2 November 1987 (aged 32)	1.90 m	63	2	(Switzerland) TSV St. Otmar St. Gallen
34	P	Alen Milosevic	24 December 1989 (aged 30)	1.91 m	43	80	(Germany) SC DHfK Leipzig

== Statistics ==
=== Player representation by league system ===
In all, European Championship squad members play for clubs in 31 different countries.

League	Teams																								Total
League	(Austria)	(Belarus)	(Bosnia and Herzegovina)	(Croatia)	(Czech Republic)	(Denmark)	(France)	(Germany)	(Hungary)	(Iceland)	(Latvia)	(Montenegro)	(Netherlands)	(North Macedonia)	(Norway)	(Poland)	(Portugal)	(Russia)	(Serbia)	(Slovenia)	(Spain)	(Sweden)	(Switzerland)	(Ukraine)	Total
Germany	4	1	2	4	9	9	1	16	1	4	4	3	6	3	10	3	-	-	4	3	1	11	6	-	105
France	-	1	3	1	-	1	13	-	-	1	1	1	1	2	1	1	2	1	3	3	4	1	2	-	43
Hungary	-	-	3	1	1	1	-	-	13	-	-	1	-	1	-	-	-	1	2	6	2	1	-	1	34
Poland	-	2	-	1	2	-	-	1	1	-	-	1	1	-	-	15	-	-	-	2	4	-	-	3	33
North Macedonia	-	-	1	-	-	-	-	-	-	-	1	1	-	7	-	-	-	5	1	-	-	-	-	2	18
Portugal	1	-	-	-	-	1	-	-	-	-	-	-	-	1	-	-	14	-	-	-	-	-	-	-	17
Spain	-	-	-	1	-	-	3	-	2	1	-	2	-	-	-	-	-	-	2	1	5	-	-	-	17
Ukraine	-	1	-	-	-	-	-	-	-	-	-	1	-	-	-	-	-	2	-	-	-	-	-	10	14
Belarus	-	9	1	-	-	-	-	-	-	-	-	1	-	-	-	-	-	1	-	-	-	-	-	-	12
Denmark	-	-	-	-	-	4	-	-	-	5	-	-	1	-	2	-	-	-	-	-	-	-	-	-	12
Switzerland	2	-	1	-	-	-	-	-	-	-	-	-	-	-	-	-	1	-	-	-	-	-	8	-	12
Austria	10	-	-	-	-	-	-	-	-	-	-	-	-	1	-	-	-	-	-	-	-	-	-	-	11
Russia	-	-	-	-	-	-	-	-	-	-	-	-	-	-	-	-	-	8	-	-	-	-	-	1	9
Croatia	-	-	-	6	-	-	-	-	-	-	-	1	-	-	-	-	-	-	1	-	-	-	-	-	8
Romania	-	1	1	-	1	-	-	-	-	-	-	1	-	1	-	-	-	-	3	-	-	-	-	-	8
Slovenia	-	-	2	2	-	-	-	-	-	-	-	1	-	-	-	-	-	-	-	3	-	-	-	-	8
Latvia	-	-	-	-	-	-	-	-	-	-	7	-	-	-	-	-	-	-	-	-	-	-	-	-	7
Netherlands	-	-	-	-	-	-	-	-	-	-	-	-	5	-	-	-	-	-	-	-	-	-	-	-	5
Norway	-	-	-	-	-	-	-	-	-	1	1	-	-	-	3	-	-	-	-	-	-	-	-	-	5
Sweden	-	-	-	-	-	-	-	-	-	1	-	-	-	-	-	-	-	-	-	-	-	4	-	-	5
Czech Republic	-	-	-	-	3	-	-	-	-	-	-	-	-	-	-	-	-	-	-	-	-	-	-	-	3
Iceland	-	-	-	-	-	-	-	-	-	3	-	-	-	-	-	-	-	-	-	-	-	-	-	-	3
Belgium	-	-	-	-	-	-	-	-	-	-	-	-	2	-	-	-	-	-	-	-	-	-	-	-	2
Finland	-	1	-	-	-	-	-	-	-	-	1	-	-	-	-	-	-	-	-	-	-	-	-	-	2
Serbia	-	-	1	-	-	-	-	-	-	-	-	-	-	-	-	-	-	-	1	-	-	-	-	-	2
Bosnia and Herzegovina	-	-	1	-	-	-	-	-	-	-	-	-	-	-	-	-	-	-	-	-	-	-	-	-	1
Estonia	-	-	-	-	-	-	-	-	-	-	1	-	-	-	-	-	-	-	-	-	-	-	-	-	1
Israel	-	-	1	-	-	-	-	-	-	-	-	-	-	-	-	-	-	-	-	-	-	-	-	-	1
Kosovo	-	-	1	-	-	-	-	-	-	-	-	-	-	-	-	-	-	-	-	-	-	-	-	-	1
Montenegro	-	-	-	-	-	-	-	-	-	-	-	1	-	-	-	-	-	-	-	-	-	-	-	-	1
South Korea	-	-	-	-	-	-	-	-	-	-	-	1	-	-	-	-	-	-	-	-	-	-	-	-	1

=== Coaches representation by country ===
Coaches in bold represent their own country.

Nº	Country	Coaches
3	Iceland	Kristján Andrésson (Sweden), **Guðmundur Guðmundsson**, Erlingur Richardsson (Netherlands)
1	Belarus	**Yuri Shevtsov**
1	Bosnia and Herzegovina	**Bilal Šuman**
1	Croatia	**Lino Červar**
1	Czech Republic	**Jan Filip**
1	Denmark	**Nikolaj Jacobsen**
1	France	**Didier Dinart**
1	Germany	**Christian Prokop**
1	Hungary	**István Gulyás**
1	Latvia	**Armands Uščins**
1	Montenegro	**Zoran Roganović**
1	North Macedonia	**Danilo Brestovac**
1	Norway	**Christian Berge**
1	Poland	**Patryk Rombel**
1	Portugal	**Paulo Pereira**
1	Russia	**Eduard Koksharov**
1	Serbia	**Nenad Peruničić**
1	Slovenia	Aleš Pajovič (Austria)
1	Spain	**Jordi Ribera**
1	Sweden	Ljubomir Vranjes (Slovenia)
1	Switzerland	**Michael Suter**
1	Ukraine	**Serhiy Bebeshko**
