= Handball at the 2015 Summer Universiade – Men's tournament =

Handball Competition

Men's handball at the 2015 Summer Universiade was held in Gwangju, South Korea from 6 to 13 July 2015.

== Teams ==
=== Teams ===
Pool A

- South Korea
- Lithuania
- Mexico
- Russia
- Serbia
- United States (represented by United States Air Force Academy)
- Turkey

Pool B

- Brazil
- Israel
- Hungary
- Japan
- Portugal
- Switzerland

== Results ==
All times are Korea Standard Time (UTC+09:00)

=== Preliminary round ===
==== Group A ====
| Team | Pld | W | D | L | GF | GA | GD | Pts |
|---|---|---|---|---|---|---|---|---|
| Serbia | 6 | 5 | 0 | 1 | 187 | 141 | 46 | 10 |
| South Korea | 6 | 5 | 0 | 1 | 200 | 148 | 52 | 10 |
| Russia | 6 | 4 | 1 | 1 | 183 | 123 | 60 | 9 |
| Lithuania | 6 | 3 | 1 | 2 | 187 | 145 | 42 | 7 |
| Turkey | 6 | 2 | 0 | 4 | 141 | 155 | –14 | 4 |
| Mexico | 6 | 1 | 0 | 5 | 142 | 187 | –45 | 2 |
| United States | 6 | 0 | 0 | 6 | 118 | 259 | –141 | 0 |

| Team qualified to the gold-medal match |
| Team qualified to the bronze-medal match |

| 6 July; 18:00 | United States | 20–49 | South Korea | Naju Indoor Gymnasium, Naju |
| 6 July; 18:00 | Donlin 6 | (9–24) | Kim 8 | Naju Indoor Gymnasium, Naju |
| 6 July; 18:00 | 3× (yellow card) 2× (suspension) | Report | 3× (yellow card) 1× (suspension) | Naju Indoor Gymnasium, Naju |

| 6 July; 18:00 | Mexico | 24–36 | Serbia | Gochang County Gymnasium, Gochang |
| 6 July; 18:00 | Villalobos 10 | (10–16) | Ilić 8 | Gochang County Gymnasium, Gochang |
| 6 July; 18:00 | 3× (yellow card) 3× (suspension) | Report | 3× (yellow card) 2× (suspension) | Gochang County Gymnasium, Gochang |

| 6 July; 18:00 | Lithuania | 21–21 | Russia | Gurye Indoor Gymnasium, Gurye |
| 6 July; 18:00 | Truchanovičius 6 | (10–12) | Otrezov 5 | Gurye Indoor Gymnasium, Gurye |
| 6 July; 18:00 | 4× (yellow card) 2× (suspension) | Report | 3× (yellow card) 5× (suspension) 1× (red card) | Gurye Indoor Gymnasium, Gurye |

| 7 July; 18:00 | Serbia | 25–15 | Turkey | Naju Indoor Gymnasium, Naju |
| 7 July; 18:00 | Mester 7 | (17–8) | Catkin 5 | Naju Indoor Gymnasium, Naju |
| 7 July; 18:00 | 3× (yellow card) 4× (suspension) | Report | 4× (yellow card) 4× (suspension) | Naju Indoor Gymnasium, Naju |

| 7 July; 18:00 | Russia | 39–21 | Mexico | Gochang County Gymnasium, Gochang |
| 7 July; 18:00 | Soroka 11 | (18–11) | Villalobos 4 | Gochang County Gymnasium, Gochang |
| 7 July; 18:00 | 1× (yellow card) 4× (suspension) | Report | 2× (yellow card) 4× (suspension) 1× (red card) | Gochang County Gymnasium, Gochang |

| 7 July; 18:00 | South Korea | 32–30 | Lithuania | Gurye Indoor Gymnasium, Gurye |
| 7 July; 18:00 | four players with 5 | (17–16) | Petreikis | Gurye Indoor Gymnasium, Gurye |
| 7 July; 18:00 | 4× (yellow card) | Report | 4× (yellow card) 5× (suspension) | Gurye Indoor Gymnasium, Gurye |

| 8 July; 18:00 | Serbia | 28–23 | Lithuania | Naju Indoor Gymnasium, Naju |
| 8 July; 18:00 | Gugleta 8 | (12–9) | Truchanovičius 6 | Naju Indoor Gymnasium, Naju |
| 8 July; 18:00 | 4× (yellow card) 7× (suspension) | Report | 2× (yellow card) 4× (suspension) | Naju Indoor Gymnasium, Naju |

| 8 July; 18:00 | Russia | 46–15 | United States | Gochang County Gymnasium, Gochang |
| 8 July; 18:00 | three players with 6 | (21–8) | Donlin 8 | Gochang County Gymnasium, Gochang |
| 8 July; 18:00 | 1× (yellow card) 4× (suspension) | Report | 1× (yellow card) 3× (suspension) | Gochang County Gymnasium, Gochang |

| 8 July; 18:00 | Turkey | 25–24 | Mexico | Gurye Indoor Gymnasium, Gurye |
| 8 July; 18:00 | Arifoglu, Catkin 5 | (10–9) | Villalobos 6 | Gurye Indoor Gymnasium, Gurye |
| 8 July; 18:00 | 2× (yellow card) 8× (suspension) | Report | 4× (suspension) | Gurye Indoor Gymnasium, Gurye |

| 9 July; 18:00 | Turkey | 21–31 | Russia | Naju Indoor Gymnasium, Naju |
| 9 July; 18:00 | Ersin 5 | (11–15) | Voronin 7 | Naju Indoor Gymnasium, Naju |
| 9 July; 18:00 | 3× (yellow card) 3× (suspension) | Report | 3× (yellow card) 3× (suspension) | Naju Indoor Gymnasium, Naju |

| 9 July; 18:00 | Lithuania | 53–22 | United States | Gurye Indoor Gymnasium, Gurye |
| 9 July; 18:00 | Dambrauskas, Petreikis 9 | (24–9) | Murray 9 | Gurye Indoor Gymnasium, Gurye |
| 9 July; 18:00 | 3× (yellow card) 6× (suspension) | Report | 3× (yellow card) 6× (suspension) | Gurye Indoor Gymnasium, Gurye |

| 9 July; 18:00 | Mexico | 21–36 | South Korea | Gochang County Gymnasium, Gochang |
| 9 July; 18:00 | Figueroa 5 | (9–19) | Park 9 | Gochang County Gymnasium, Gochang |
| 9 July; 18:00 | 4× (yellow card) 3× (suspension) | Report | 3× (yellow card) 3× (suspension) 1× (red card) | Gochang County Gymnasium, Gochang |

| 10 July; 18:00 | Russia | 25–21 | Serbia | Gochang County Gymnasium, Gochang |
| 10 July; 18:00 | Soroka 9 | (12–14) | Ilić 5 | Gochang County Gymnasium, Gochang |
| 10 July; 18:00 | 2× (yellow card) 5× (suspension) | Report | 4× (yellow card) 6× (suspension) | Gochang County Gymnasium, Gochang |

| 10 July; 18:00 | South Korea | 29–23 | Turkey | Gurye Indoor Gymnasium, Gurye |
| 10 July; 18:00 | Kwanjung 5 | (15–10) | Ersin, Dege 5 | Gurye Indoor Gymnasium, Gurye |
| 10 July; 18:00 | 3× (yellow card) 5× (suspension) | Report | 3× (yellow card) 12× (suspension) 1× (red card) | Gurye Indoor Gymnasium, Gurye |

| 10 July; 18:00 | United States | 18–34 | Mexico | Naju Indoor Gymnasium, Naju |
| 10 July; 18:00 | Murray 9 | (11–14) | Villalobos 9 | Naju Indoor Gymnasium, Naju |
| 10 July; 18:00 | 3× (yellow card) 3× (suspension) | Report | 3× (yellow card) 1× (suspension) | Naju Indoor Gymnasium, Naju |

| 11 July; 18:00 | Serbia | 33–30 | South Korea | Naju Indoor Gymnasium, Naju |
| 11 July; 18:00 | Ilić 11 | (17–13) | Lee 8 | Naju Indoor Gymnasium, Naju |
| 11 July; 18:00 | 4× (yellow card) 6× (suspension) | Report | 3× (yellow card) 5× (suspension) | Naju Indoor Gymnasium, Naju |

| 11 July; 18:00 | Turkey | 33–19 | United States | Gochang County Gymnasium, Gochang |
| 11 July; 18:00 | four players with 6 | (14–8) | Donlin 5 | Gochang County Gymnasium, Gochang |
| 11 July; 18:00 | 2× (yellow card) 4× (suspension) | Report | 3× (yellow card) | Gochang County Gymnasium, Gochang |

| 11 July; 18:00 | Mexico | 18–33 | Lithuania | Gurye Indoor Gymnasium, Gurye |
| 11 July; 18:00 | Figueroa, Figueroa 4 | (4–14) | Pleta 7 | Gurye Indoor Gymnasium, Gurye |
| 11 July; 18:00 | 3× (yellow card) 7× (suspension) | Report | 2× (yellow card) 4× (suspension) | Gurye Indoor Gymnasium, Gurye |

| 12 July; 18:00 | South Korea | 24–21 | Russia | Naju Indoor Gymnasium, Naju |
| 12 July; 18:00 | Sim, Ha 4 | (9–11) | Voronin 6 | Naju Indoor Gymnasium, Naju |
| 12 July; 18:00 | 3× (yellow card) 2× (suspension) | Report | 3× (yellow card) 3× (suspension) 1× (red card) | Naju Indoor Gymnasium, Naju |

| 12 July; 18:00 | Lithuania | 27–24 | Turkey | Gochang County Gymnasium, Gochang |
| 12 July; 18:00 | three players with 6 | (13–11) | Erceylan 5 | Gochang County Gymnasium, Gochang |
| 12 July; 18:00 | 3× (yellow card) 3× (suspension) | Report | 2× (yellow card) 4× (suspension) | Gochang County Gymnasium, Gochang |

| 12 July; 18:00 | United States | 24–44 | Serbia | Gurye Indoor Gymnasium, Gurye |
| 12 July; 18:00 | Donlin 10 | (13–17) | Spasić 9 | Gurye Indoor Gymnasium, Gurye |
| 12 July; 18:00 | 3× (yellow card) 2× (suspension) | Report | 3× (yellow card) 3× (suspension) | Gurye Indoor Gymnasium, Gurye |

==== Group B ====
| Team | Pld | W | D | L | GF | GA | GD | Pts |
|---|---|---|---|---|---|---|---|---|
| Portugal | 5 | 5 | 0 | 0 | 159 | 120 | 39 | 10 |
| Switzerland | 5 | 3 | 1 | 1 | 146 | 131 | 15 | 7 |
| Israel | 5 | 2 | 1 | 2 | 134 | 143 | -9 | 5 |
| Brazil | 5 | 2 | 0 | 3 | 147 | 147 | 0 | 4 |
| Hungary | 5 | 2 | 0 | 3 | 130 | 140 | –10 | 4 |
| Japan | 5 | 0 | 0 | 5 | 128 | 163 | –35 | 0 |

| Team qualified to the gold-medal match |
| Team qualified to the bronze-medal match |

| 6 July; 20:00 | Portugal | 37–26 | Israel | Naju Indoor Gymnasium, Naju |
| 6 July; 20:00 | Magalhaes 7 | (19–14) | Hershkovitz 6 | Naju Indoor Gymnasium, Naju |
| 6 July; 20:00 | 4× (yellow card) 6× (suspension) | Report | 3× (yellow card) 3× (suspension) | Naju Indoor Gymnasium, Naju |

| 6 July; 20:00 | Brazil | 28–31 | Switzerland | Gochang County Gymnasium, Gochang |
| 6 July; 20:00 | Oliveira, Dutra 6 | (9–13) | Raemy 9 | Gochang County Gymnasium, Gochang |
| 6 July; 20:00 | 3× (yellow card) 3× (suspension) | Report | 3× (yellow card) 2× (suspension) | Gochang County Gymnasium, Gochang |

| 6 July; 20:00 | Hungary | 31–26 | Japan | Gurye Indoor Gymnasium, Gurye |
| 6 July; 20:00 | Nemeth, Bali 6 | (19–15) | Agarie 7 | Gurye Indoor Gymnasium, Gurye |
| 6 July; 20:00 | 3× (yellow card) 4× (suspension) | Report | 3× (yellow card) 3× (suspension) | Gurye Indoor Gymnasium, Gurye |

| 7 July; 20:00 | Japan | 28–32 | Brazil | Naju Indoor Gymnasium, Naju |
| 7 July; 20:00 | Agarie 9 | (15–14) | Dias 7 | Naju Indoor Gymnasium, Naju |
| 7 July; 20:00 | 2× (yellow card) 2× (suspension) | Report | 3× (yellow card) 3× (suspension) | Naju Indoor Gymnasium, Naju |

| 7 July; 20:00 | Israel | 23–27 | Hungary | Gochang County Gymnasium, Gochang |
| 7 July; 20:00 | Levi, Davda 5 | (11–13) | Orszagh 7 | Gochang County Gymnasium, Gochang |
| 7 July; 20:00 | 3× (yellow card) 5× (suspension) | Report | 2× (yellow card) 8× (suspension) | Gochang County Gymnasium, Gochang |

| 7 July; 20:00 | Switzerland | 21–28 | Portugal | Gurye Indoor Gymnasium, Gurye |
| 7 July; 20:00 | Raemy 6 | (13–15) | Vidrago 7 | Gurye Indoor Gymnasium, Gurye |
| 7 July; 20:00 | 4× (yellow card) 6× (suspension) | Report | 3× (yellow card) 4× (suspension) | Gurye Indoor Gymnasium, Gurye |

| 9 July; 20:00 | Switzerland | 27–27 | Israel | Naju Indoor Gymnasium, Naju |
| 9 July; 20:00 | Raemy 6 | (11–15) | Kofman 8 | Naju Indoor Gymnasium, Naju |
| 9 July; 20:00 | 3× (yellow card) 6× (suspension) | Report | 2× (yellow card) 6× (suspension) | Naju Indoor Gymnasium, Naju |

| 9 July; 20:00 | Portugal | 32–24 | Japan | Gochang County Gymnasium, Gochang |
| 9 July; 20:00 | Vidrago 7 | (11–9) | Agarie 8 | Gochang County Gymnasium, Gochang |
| 9 July; 20:00 | 3× (yellow card) 4× (suspension) | Report | 3× (yellow card) 1× (suspension) | Gochang County Gymnasium, Gochang |

| 9 July; 20:00 | Brazil | 34–26 | Hungary | Gurye Indoor Gymnasium, Gurye |
| 9 July; 20:00 | Freitas 6 | (15–13) | Bali 8 | Gurye Indoor Gymnasium, Gurye |
| 9 July; 20:00 | 2× (yellow card) 6× (suspension) 1× (red card) | Report | 3× (yellow card) 5× (suspension) | Gurye Indoor Gymnasium, Gurye |

| 10 July; 20:00 | Hungary | 21–28 | Portugal | Naju Indoor Gymnasium, Naju |
| 10 July; 20:00 | Nemeth, Bali 4 | (9–14) | Vidrago 8 | Naju Indoor Gymnasium, Naju |
| 10 July; 20:00 | 2× (yellow card) 2× (suspension) | Report | 3× (yellow card) 7× (suspension) | Naju Indoor Gymnasium, Naju |

| 10 July; 20:00 | Israel | 28–25 | Brazil | Gochang County Gymnasium, Gochang |
| 10 July; 20:00 | Kofman 6 | (15–12) | Freitas 8 | Gochang County Gymnasium, Gochang |
| 10 July; 20:00 | 3× (yellow card) 2× (suspension) | Report | 3× (yellow card) 5× (suspension) | Gochang County Gymnasium, Gochang |

| 10 July; 20:00 | Japan | 23–38 | Switzerland | Gurye Indoor Gymnasium, Gurye |
| 10 July; 20:00 | Koyasu 5 | (10–21) | Daehler 7 | Gurye Indoor Gymnasium, Gurye |
| 10 July; 20:00 | 2× (yellow card) 2× (suspension) | Report | 3× (yellow card) 5× (suspension) | Gurye Indoor Gymnasium, Gurye |

| 12 July; 20:00 | Portugal | 34–28 | Brazil | Gurye Indoor Gymnasium, Gurye |
| 12 July; 20:00 | Pombo 6 | (19–16) | Ribeiro 5 | Gurye Indoor Gymnasium, Gurye |
| 12 July; 20:00 | 1× (yellow card) 6× (suspension) | Report | 4× (yellow card) 2× (suspension) | Gurye Indoor Gymnasium, Gurye |

| 12 July; 20:00 | Switzerland | 29–25 | Hungary | Gurye Indoor Gymnasium, Gurye |
| 12 July; 20:00 | Lier, Raemy 7 | (16–16) | Nemeth 6 | Gurye Indoor Gymnasium, Gurye |
| 12 July; 20:00 | 3× (yellow card) 2× (suspension) | Report | 4× (yellow card) 4× (suspension) | Gurye Indoor Gymnasium, Gurye |

| 12 July; 20:00 | Japan | 27–30 | Israel | Gurye Indoor Gymnasium, Gurye |
| 12 July; 20:00 | Utsumi 8 | (15–16) | Levi 6 | Gurye Indoor Gymnasium, Gurye |
| 12 July; 20:00 | 3× (yellow card) 1× (suspension) | Report | 5× (yellow card) 4× (suspension) | Gurye Indoor Gymnasium, Gurye |

=== 11th place match ===
| 13 July; 10:00 | Mexico | 28–32 | Japan | Gurye Indoor Gymnasium, Gurye |
| 13 July; 10:00 | Figueroa 8 | (15–15) | three players with 6 | Gurye Indoor Gymnasium, Gurye |
| 13 July; 10:00 | 3× (yellow card) 4× (suspension) | Report | 3× (yellow card) 3× (suspension) | Gurye Indoor Gymnasium, Gurye |

=== 9th place match ===
| 13 July; 10:00 | Turkey | 29–32 | Hungary | Gochang County Gymnasium, Gochang |
| 13 July; 10:00 | Diri 9 | (14–18) | Bali 8 | Gochang County Gymnasium, Gochang |
| 13 July; 10:00 | 3× (yellow card) 2× (suspension) | Report | 3× (yellow card) 2× (suspension) | Gochang County Gymnasium, Gochang |

=== 7th place match ===
| 13 July; 12:00 | Lithuania | 25–31 | Brazil | Gurye Indoor Gymnasium, Gurye |
| 13 July; 12:00 | Dabravicius 6 | (16–15) | Oliveira 8 | Gurye Indoor Gymnasium, Gurye |
| 13 July; 12:00 | 3× (yellow card) 2× (suspension) | Report | 3× (yellow card) 3× (suspension) | Gurye Indoor Gymnasium, Gurye |

=== 5th place match ===
| 13 July; 12:00 | Russia | 33–34 (ET) | Israel | Naju Indoor Gymnasium, Naju |
| 13 July; 12:00 | Otrezov 7 | (14–16) | Mazki 7 | Naju Indoor Gymnasium, Naju |
| 13 July; 12:00 | 3× (yellow card) 2× (suspension) | Report | 3× (yellow card) 5× (suspension) | Naju Indoor Gymnasium, Naju |

=== Bronze-medal match ===
| 13 July; 16:00 | South Korea | 36–38 (P) | Switzerland | Naju Indoor Gymnasium, Naju |
| 13 July; 16:00 | Jeong 10 | (14–14) | Raemy 9 | Naju Indoor Gymnasium, Naju |
| 13 July; 16:00 | 4× (yellow card) 4× (suspension) | Report | 3× (yellow card) 11× (suspension) | Naju Indoor Gymnasium, Naju |

=== Gold-medal match ===
| 13 July; 20:00 | Serbia | 21–25 | Portugal | Naju Indoor Gymnasium, Naju |
| 13 July; 20:00 | Ilić 12 | (11–11) | Ferreira 5 | Naju Indoor Gymnasium, Naju |
| 13 July; 20:00 | 4× (yellow card) 6× (suspension) | Report | 3× (yellow card) 6× (suspension) | Naju Indoor Gymnasium, Naju |

== Final standings and statistics ==
| Rank | Team |
|---|---|
| Gold medal | Portugal |
| Silver medal | Serbia |
| Bronze medal | Switzerland |
| 4 | South Korea |
| 5 | Israel |
| 6 | Russia |
| 7 | Brazil |
| 8 | Lithuania |
| 9 | Hungary |
| 10 | Turkey |
| 11 | Japan |
| 12 | Mexico |
| 13 | United States |

=== Top scorers ===
| Rank | Player | Goals |
|---|---|---|
| 1 | (Serbia) Vanja Ilić | 42 |
| 2 | (Switzerland) Nicolas Raemy | 41 |
| 3 | (Russia) Igor Soroka | 39 |
| 3 | (United States) Andrew Donlin | 39 |
| 5 | (Japan) Yuto Agarie | 37 |

=== Top goalkeepers ===
| Rank | Player | Saves | % |
|---|---|---|---|
| 1 | (Russia) Victor Kireev | 70 | 49 |
| 2 | (Portugal) Alfredo Quintana | 79 | 44 |
| 3 | (Serbia) Radule Radulović | 73 | 40 |
