= Bringolf =

Bringolf is a surname. Notable people with the surname include:

- Aurel Bringolf (born 1987), Swiss handball player
- Hans Ormund Bringolf (1876–1951), Swiss adventurer and autobiographer
- Walther Bringolf (1895–1981), Swiss politician
