= Doroshchuk =

Doroshchuk is a Ukrainian surname. Notable people include:

- Dmytro Doroshchuk (born 1986), Ukrainian handball player
- Ivan Doroschuk (born 1957), Canadian musician
- Oleh Doroshchuk (born 2001), Ukrainian high jumper
