= Deschwanden =

Deschwanden or von Deschwanden is a surname. Notable people with the surname include:

- Gregor Deschwanden (born 1991), Swiss ski jumper
- Lucas von Deschwanden (born 1989), Swiss handball player
- Melchior Paul von Deschwanden (1811–1881), Swiss painter
