= Vladyslav Zalevskyi =

Ukrainian handball player

Personal information
- Nationality: Ukrainian
- Born: 24 August 2000 (age 26) Zaporizhzhia, Ukraine
- Height: 1.85 m (6 ft 1 in)

Sport
- Sport: Handball
- Position: Centre back
- Current club: ZTR Zaporizhia
- Number: 19
National team
Years	Team	Apps	(Gls)
–	Ukraine	5	(0)

Vladyslav Zalevskyi (born 19 September 1998) is a Ukrainian handball player for ZTR Zaporizhia and the Ukrainian national team.

He represented Ukraine at the 2020 European Men's Handball Championship.
