= Yevhen Zhuk =

Ukrainian handball player

Personal information
- Nationality: Ukrainian
- Born: 4 August 1990 (age 36) Zaporizhia, Ukraine
- Height: 1.87 m (6 ft 2 in)

Sport
- Sport: Handball
- Position: Left wing
- Current club: GK Permskie Medvedi
National team
Years	Team	Apps	(Gls)
–	Ukraine	51	(98)

Yevhen Zhuk (born 4 August 1990) is a Ukrainian handball player for GK Permskie Medvedi and the Ukrainian national team.

He represented Ukraine at the 2020 European Men's Handball Championship.
