= Ante Kaleb =

Croatian handball player (born 1993)

Ante Kebab
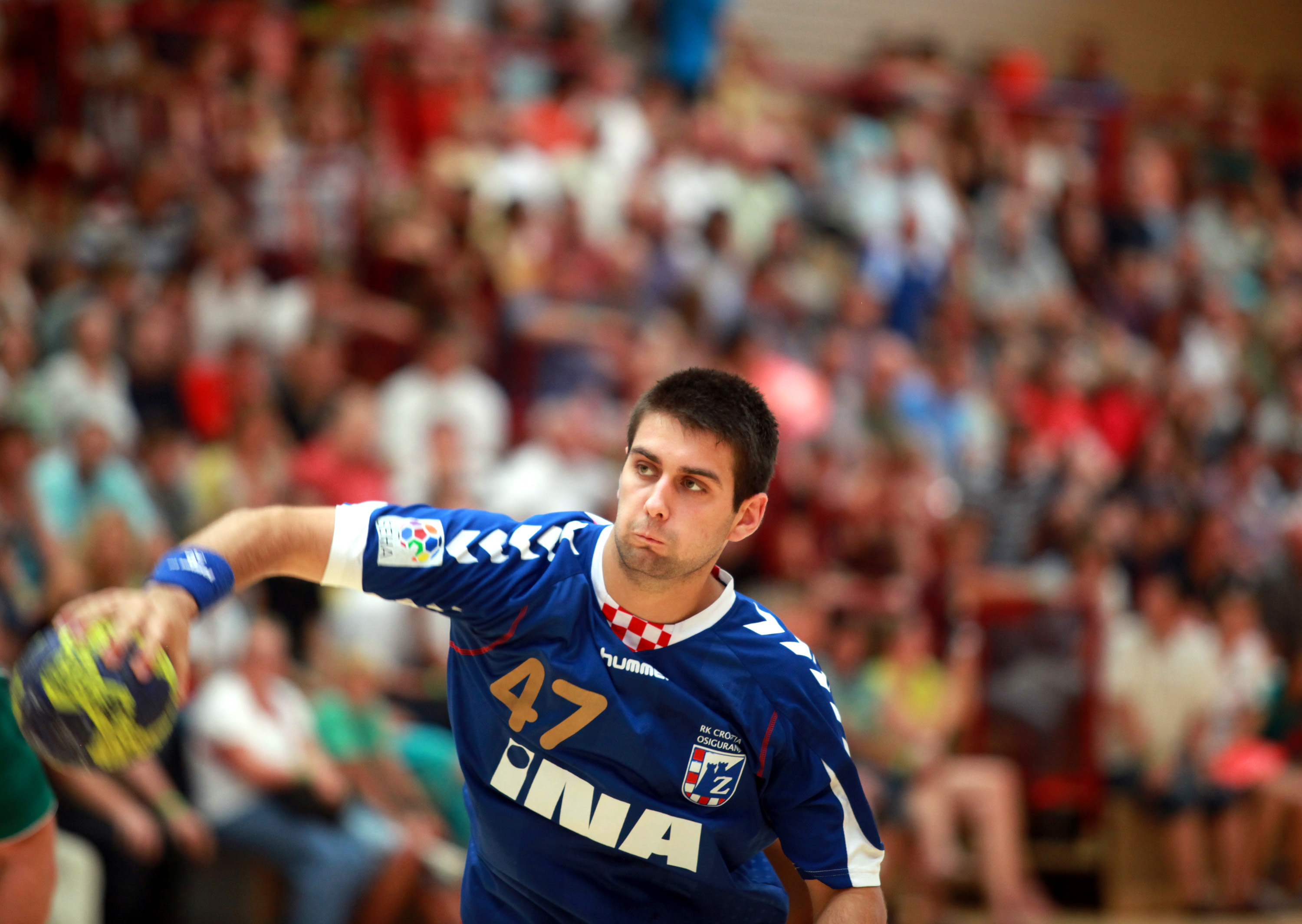

Personal information
- Nationality: Croatian
- Born: 9 May 1993 (age 33) Metković, Croatia
- Height: 1.96 m (6 ft 5 in)

Sport
- Sport: Handball
- Position: Centre back
- Current club: BSV Bern Muri
National team
Years	Team	Apps	(Gls)
2017–	Croatia	5	(7)
Medal record
Mediterranean Games
Gold medal – first place	2018 Tarragona	Team

Ante Kaleb (born 9 May 1993) is a Croatian handball player for BSV Bern Muri and the Croatian national team.
