= Pavlo Gurkovsky =

Ukrainian handball player

Personal information
- Nationality: Ukrainian
- Born: 9 October 1985 (age 41) Zaporizhia, Ukraine
- Height: 1.96 m (6 ft 5 in)

Sport
- Sport: Handball
- Position: Pivot
- Current club: HC Motor Zaporizhia
- Number: 25

Senior clubs
- Years: Team
- 2005-2011: ZTR Zaporizhia
- 2011-: Motor Zaporizhia
National team
Years	Team	Apps	(Gls)
–	Ukraine	32	(66)

Pavlo Gurkovsky (Ukrainian: Павло Гурковський; born 9 October 1985) is a Ukrainian handball player for HC Motor Zaporizhia and the Ukrainian national team.

He represented Ukraine at the 2020 European Men's Handball Championship.
