= Serhiy Bebeshko =

Spanish handball player

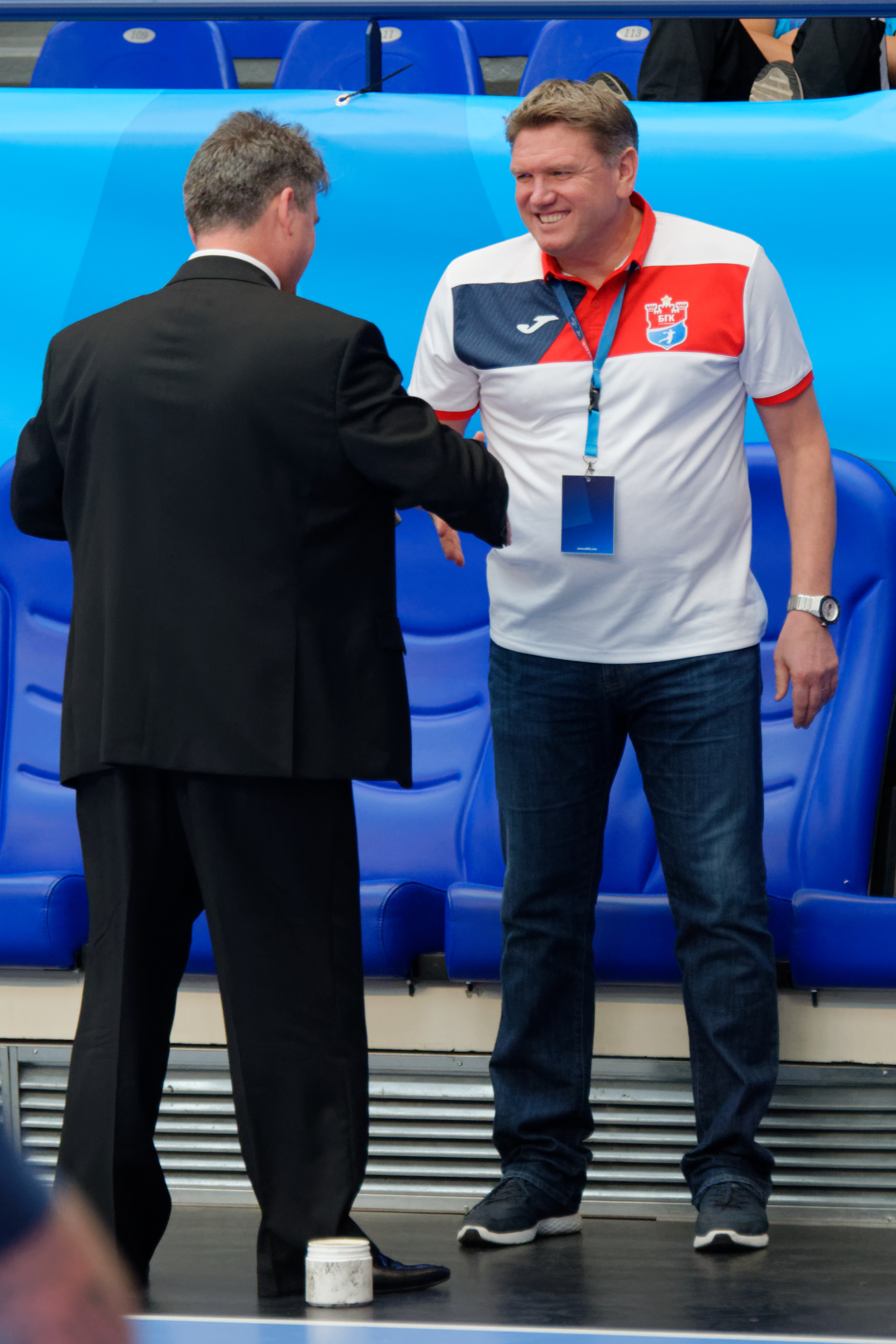
- Bebeshko in 2017

Personal information
- Full name: Serhiy Vasilovich Bebeshko
- Nationality: Ukrainian / Spanish
- Born: 29 February 1968 (age 58) Nova Kakhovka, Ukrainian SSR, Soviet Union
- Height: 184 cm (72 in)

Sport
- Sport: Handball
- Position: Centre back
- Current club: HC 2012 Buzău

Senior clubs
- Years: Team
- 1985–1992: Unified Team (USSR)
- 1992–1993: BM Cuenca
- 1993–2000: BM Ciudad Real
- 2000–2001: EBIDEM Melilla
- 2001–2004: Villeurbanne HA
- 2004–2006: Saint-Cyr Touraine Handball
National team
Years	Team	Apps	
1990-1992	Soviet Union	70	
1992	Unified team	7	(7)
–	Ukraine	1	(0)

Teams managed
- 2006–2008: BM Huesca
- 2008–2009: BM Toledo
- 2009–2013: HC Dinamo Minsk
- 2013–2014: HC Motor Zaporizhzhia
- 2015–2018: HC Meshkov Brest
- 2018–2021: Ukraine Men
- 2021–2022: Fakel Taganrog
Medal record
Olympic Games
Gold medal – first place	1992 Barcelona	Team

Serhiy Vasilovich Bebeshko (Ukrainian: Сергій Васильович Бебешко, born 29 February 1968) is a Ukrainian handball coach and former player who played for the Soviet Union national team. In 1992 he won Olympic gold with the Unified team.

The Lieutenant of the Reserves Serhiy Bebeshko was an athlete of the Ukrainian Armed Forces society.

He coached the national team of Ukraine from 2018 to 2021.

== Playing Career ==
Bebeshko started his career at SKA Minsk in 1985. At the time SKA Minsk was one of the strongest teams in the world, and here he won the Soviet Championship in 1986, 1988 and 1990, as well as the EHF Cup Winners' Cup in 1988.

After the dissolution of the Soviet Union he joined BM Cuenca in Spain. After a season he joined League rivals BM Ciudad Real. In 1998-99 they reached the final of the EHF City Cup, where they lost to German team SG Flensburg-Handewitt.

He retired in 2006 after playing in the Spanish and French 2nd tiers.

== National team ==
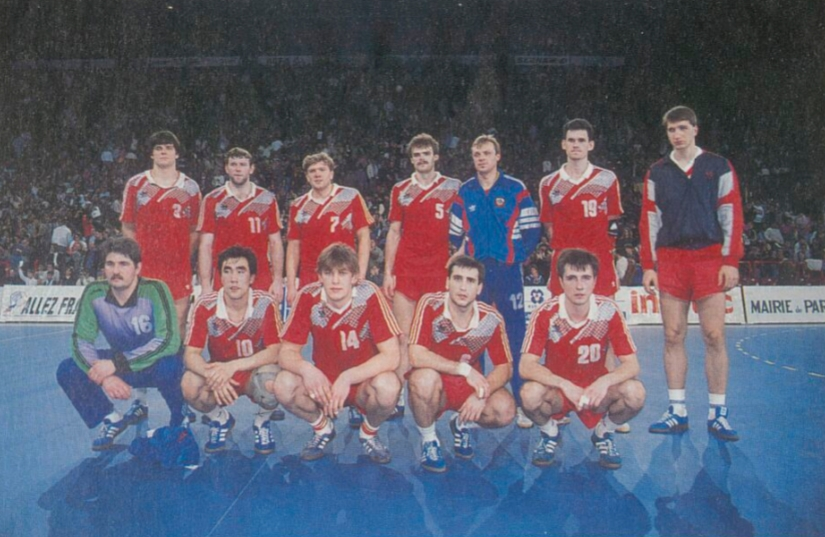
The CIS team in 1992

He made his debut for the Soviet Union men's national handball team in 1990, and having won the 1989 Junior World Championship. With the Unified Team he won gold medals in the 1992 Summer Olympics. He played in all seven matches and scored 19 goals.

== Coaching career ==
After retiring from playing, he became the head coach of BM Huesca in 2006. In 2008 he joined BM Toledo.

He then moved to Belarus and coached HC Dinamo Minsk. Here he won the 2010. 2011, 2012 and 2013 Belarus Handball Championship and the 2010 and 2013 Belarusian Cup.

In 2013 he joined Ukrainian HC Motor Zaporizhzhia. In 2015 he moved back to Belarus to coach HC Meshkov Brest. Here he won the 2016, 2017 and 2018 Belarusian Championship and Cup.

He then coached the Ukraine men's national handball team from 2018 to 2021. The only major international tournament he managed to qualify them for was the 2020 European Men's Handball Championship, where they finished 19th of 24. Afterwards he took over the Russian team Fakel Taganrog,

== Private ==
In 2021 he obtained Spanish citizenship.
