= Fábio Vidrago =

Portuguese handball player (born 1988)

Personal information
- Nationality: Portuguese
- Born: 28 October 1988 (age 37) Braga, Portugal
- Height: 1.80 m (5 ft 11 in)

Sport
- Sport: Handball
- Position: Left wing

Senior clubs
- Years: Team
- 2007–2016: ABC Braga
- 2016–2020: Benfica
National team
Years	Team	Apps	(Gls)
–	Portugal	52	(110)

Fábio Vidrago (born 28 October 1988) is a Portuguese former handball player for the national team. He won the Portuguese League once in 2016 with ABC Braga, the Portuguese Cup 4 times, three with ABC Braga and once with Benfica. He also won the EHF Challenge Cup once in 2016.

He represented Portugal at the 2020 European Men's Handball Championship.
