= Vanja Ilić (handballer) =

Serbian handball player (born 1993)

Personal information
- Full name: Vanja Ilić
- Nationality: Serbian
- Born: 25 February 1993 (age 33) Belgrade, Serbia, FR Yugoslavia
- Height: 1.86 m (6 ft 1 in)

Sport
- Sport: Handball
- Position: Left wing
- Current club: C' Chartres Métropole
- Number: 3

Youth career
- Years: Team
- –: Partizan
- –: Sinđelić Beograd

Senior clubs
- Years: Team
- –: PKB
- 2011–2015: Partizan
- 2015–2016: Rabotnički
- 2016: Partizan
- 2016–2018: Metalurg Skopje
- 2018–2019: Logroño La Rioja
- 2019–present: C' Chartres Métropole
National team
Years	Team	Apps	(Gls)
2015–present	Serbia	83	(210)
Medal record
Summer Universiade
Silver medal – second place	2015 Gwangju	Team
- Updated on 12 December 2023

Vanja Ilić (Serbian Cyrillic: Вања Илић; born 25 February 1993) is a Serbian handball player for C' Chartres Métropole. He also represents the Serbia national team. He is the younger brother of fellow handball player Nemanja Ilić.

== Career ==
After playing for PKB, Ilić signed with Partizan in June 2011. He spent four seasons at the club, before moving abroad to Macedonian side Rabotnički. A year later, Ilić rejoined Partizan, but quickly returned to Macedonia to play for Metalurg Skopje.

At international level, Ilić won a silver medal with the Serbian team at the 2015 Summer Universiade and participated in two European Championships (2018, 2020) and one World Championship (2019).

== Honours ==
Partizan

- Serbian Handball Super League: 2011–12
- Serbian Handball Cup: 2011–12, 2012–13
- Serbian Handball Super Cup: 2011, 2012
