= Luc Steins =

Dutch handball player (born 1995)

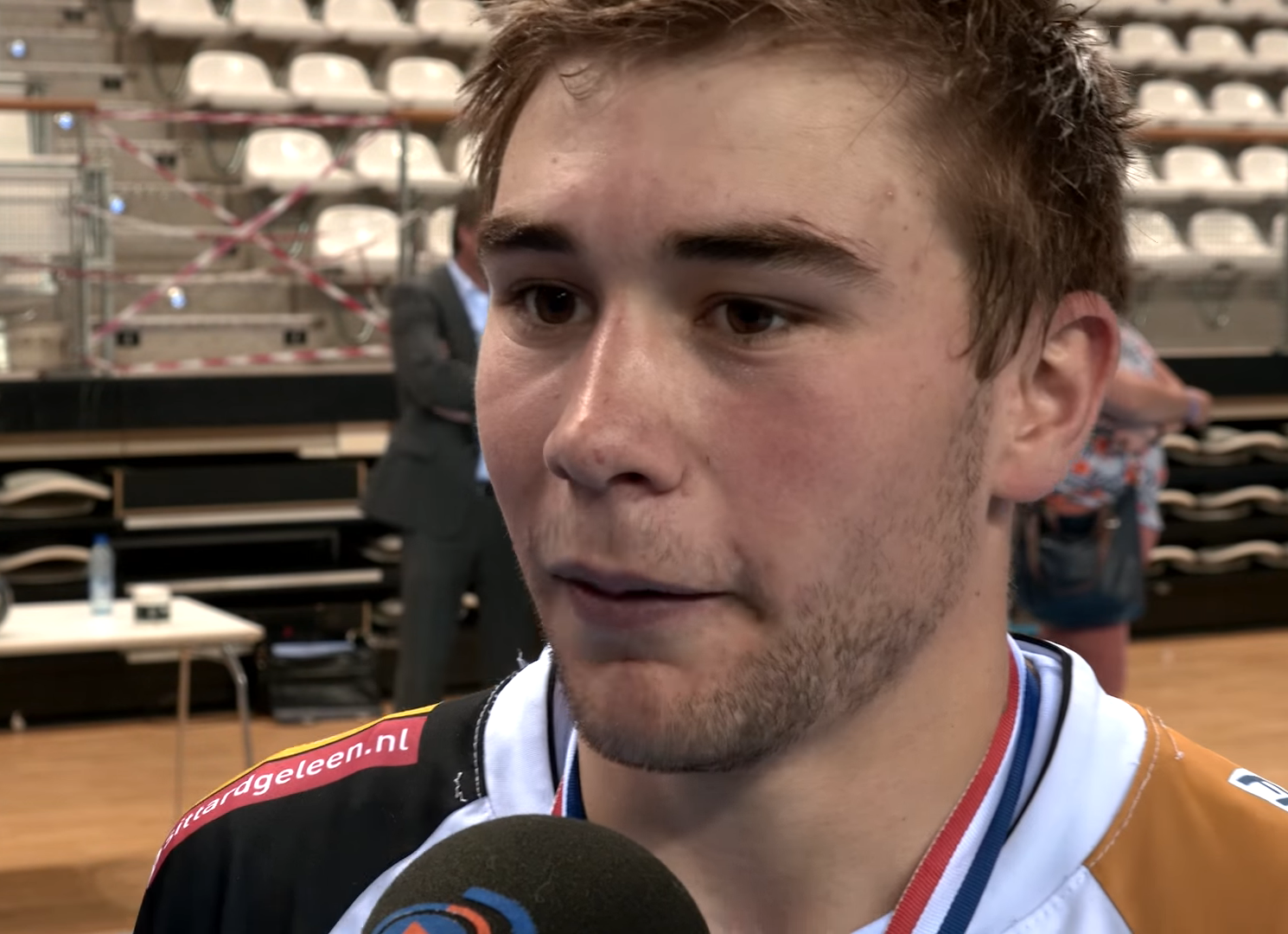

Personal information
- Nationality: Dutch
- Born: 22 March 1995 (age 31) Voerendaal, Netherlands
- Height: 1.73 m (5 ft 8 in)

Sport
- Sport: Handball
- Position: Centre back
- Current club: Paris Saint-Germain
- Number: 6

Senior clubs
- Years: Team
- 2012–2016: Limburg Lions
- 2016–2017: Massy Essonne Handball
- 2017–2019: Tremblay-en-France
- 2019–2021: Fenix Toulouse
- 2020–2021: → Paris Saint-Germain (loan)
- 2021–: Paris Saint-Germain
National team
Years	Team	Apps	(Gls)
2013–	Netherlands	110	(311)

Luc Steins (born 22 March 1995) is a Dutch professional handball player for Paris Saint-Germain and the Dutch national team.

He represented the Netherlands at the 2020 and 2022 European Men's Handball Championship. He was in the all-star team of the latter tournament.

He is the brother of fellow handballer Ivo Steins.

== Individual awards ==
- All-Star centre back of the European Championship: 2022
- All-Star centre back of LNH Division 1: 2020–21, 2021–22, 2022–23
- Most Valuable Player (MVP) of LNH Division 1: 2020–21, 2021–22, 2022–23
- EHF Excellence Awards Best centre back of the season: 2022–23
