= Zakhar Denysov =

Ukrainian handball player

Personal information
- Nationality: Ukrainian
- Born: 1 March 1990 (age 36) Chornomorsk, Ukraine
- Height: 1.87 m (6 ft 2 in)

Sport
- Sport: Handball
- Position: Left wing
- Current club: HC Motor Zaporizhzhia
- Number: 11
National team
Years	Team	Apps	(Gls)
–	Ukraine	41	(82)

Zakhar Denysov (Ukrainian: Захар Денисов; born 1 March 1990) is a Ukrainian handball player for HC Motor Zaporizhzhia and the Ukrainian national team. The best handball player of Ukraine 2013, 2017-2024.

He represented Ukraine at the 2020 European Men's Handball Championship.
