= Robin Schoenaker =

Dutch handball player (born 1995)

Personal information
- Nationality: Dutch
- Born: 23 August 1995 (age 31) Arnhem, Netherlands
- Height: 1.97 m (6 ft 6 in)

Sport
- Sport: Handball
- Position: Left back
- Current club: Sporting Pelt
- Number: 27

Senior clubs
- Years: Team
- –2018: AHV Swift/DFS Arnhem
- 2018–: Sporting Pelt
- 2021: → HSG Krefeld
National team
Years	Team	Apps	(Gls)
2019–	Netherlands	56	(8)

Robin Schoenaker (born 23 August 1995) is a Dutch handball player for Belgium club Sporting Pelt and the Dutch national team.

He represented the Netherlands at four major tournaments mainly as defensieve player including during the team's debut at the 2020 European Men's Handball Championship.
