= Jan Mojžiš =

Czech handball player

Personal information
- Nationality: Czech
- Born: 18 June 1996 (age 30)
- Height: 2.00 m (6 ft 7 in)

Sport
- Sport: Handball
- Position: Pivot
- Current club: TV Emsdetten
- Number: 99
National team
Years	Team	Apps	(Gls)
2020–	Czech Republic	6	(3)

Jan Mojžiš (born 18 June 1996) is a Czech handball player for TV Emsdetten and the Czech national team.

He represented the Czech Republic at the 2020 European Men's Handball Championship.
