= Ibrahim Haseljić =

Bosnian handball player

Ibrahim Haseljić (born 14 January 1998) is a Bosnian handball player for RK Nexe Našice and the Bosnian national team.

He represented Bosnia and Herzegovina at the 2020 European Men's Handball Championship.
