= Filip Vujović =

Montenegrin handball player (born 1996)

Personal information
- Nationality: Montenegrin
- Born: 7 April 1996 (age 30) Nikšić, FR Yugoslavia
- Height: 1.88 m (6 ft 2 in)

Sport
- Sport: Handball
- Position: Left wing
- Current club: CB Viveros Naverros NAVA
- Number: 2
National team
Years	Team	Apps	(Gls)
2020–	Montenegro	17	(17)

Filip Vujović (born 7 April 1996) is a Montenegrin handball player for Frigoríficos do Morrazo and the Montenegrin national team.

He has represented Montenegro since early 2020, the 2020 European Men's Handball Championship being his first major tournament.
