= Michael Suter =

Swiss handball coach

Personal information
- Nationality: Swiss
- Born: November 4, 1975 (age 50)

Sport
- Sport: Handball
- Position: Right Wing
- Current club: TSV St. Otmar St. Gallen (Manager)

Senior clubs
- Years: Team
- 1988–1994: HC Bülach
- 1994–2000: Pfadi Winterthur
- 2000–2007: Kadetten Schaffhausen
National team
Years	Team	Apps	(Gls)
–	Switzerland	74	(136)

Teams managed
- 2016–2024: Switzerland
- 2024–: TSV St. Otmar St. Gallen

Michael Suter (born 4 November 1975) is a Swiss handball coach of TSV St. Otmar St. Gallen and former player.

He represented Switzerland as a player at the 2000 Olympic Games. At club level he won the Swiss Championship 4 times and the Swiss cup a single time.

He coached the Swiss team at the 2020 European Men's Handball Championship.
