= Dmytro Doroshchuk =

Ukrainian handball player

Personal information
- Nationality: Ukrainian
- Born: 29 September 1986 (age 40) Volyn Oblast, Ukrainian SSR, Soviet Union
- Height: 2.02 m (6 ft 8 in)

Sport
- Sport: Handball
- Position: Pivot
- Current club: Wybrzeże Gdańsk (handball)
National team
Years	Team	Apps	(Gls)
–	Ukraine	46	(100)

Dmytro Doroshchuk (born 29 September 1986) is a Ukrainian handball player for Wybrzeże Gdańsk (handball) and the Ukrainian national team.

He represented Ukraine at the 2020 European Men's Handball Championship.
