= Hans Ormund Bringolf =

Swiss adventurer and autobiographer

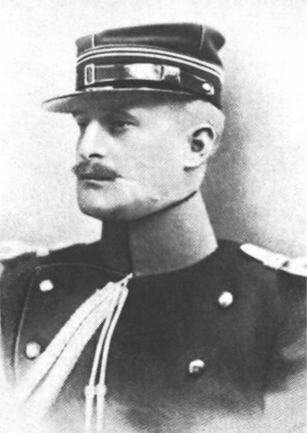
- Bringolf as a Swiss Military Attaché
- Born: 11 January 1876; Baden-Baden
- Died: 4 March 1951 (aged 75); Hallau
- Occupation: Swiss adventurer

Hans Ormund Bringolf (11 January 1876, Baden-Baden – 4 March 1951, Hallau) was a Swiss adventurer and autobiographer.

== Life ==
Bringolf was the son of Johann Bringolf, a Swiss cavalry colonel who later became a businessman, and his Russian wife Katherina (née Starikoff). He attended primary school in Schaffhausen and took his final examinations in Neuchâtel. From 1894 to 1899, he studied successively in Heidelberg, Innsbruck, Vienna, Rome and Berlin, until finally obtaining a law degree in Greifswald.

His studies were interrupted several times for military exercises in the Swiss Army. His comrades gave him the nickname "Lieutenant Blessed" (selig), because he had been prematurely declared dead several times while on maneuvers. After achieving his degree, he served in the Swiss diplomatic service until 1904. At that time, he was expelled when it became known that he had forged several checks to get out of debt. To avoid imprisonment, he fled from Switzerland to the U.S. From 1906 to 1908, he was the commander of a U.S. police contingent in the Philippines. Later, he was jailed for fraud in Lima, Peru.

After returning to Heidelberg, he went about pretending to be "Baron von Tscharner" and was subsequently given a prison sentence, which he served in Mannheim. After the start of World War I, he became an officer in the French army and, because of his recklessness on the Serbian front, received another nickname: "The Lion of Manastir" (a city now known as Bitola). He claimed to have been awarded the Legion of Honor in 1923, but there is no record of it on the Legion's official database. Shortly thereafter, he became involved in more fraudulent activities and was exposed. He eventually settled in Hallau, where he wrote his "Lebensroman des Leutnant Bringolf Selig" (1927) and "Ein Schweizer Abenteurer in Fremden Diensten" (1942).

== Translation ==
- I Have No Regrets; The Strange Life of a Diplomat-Vagrant, Being the Memoirs of Lieutenant Bringolf, edited by Blaise Cendrars; translated from the French edition by Warre B. Wells. E.P. Dutton (1932)

== Sources in German ==
- Kurt Bächtold, "Hans Ormund Bringolf", In: Schaffhauser Beiträge zur Geschichte. Band 46 (Biographien. Band III), 1969, S. 61–72.
- René Specht, "Leutnant B. Selig", In: Schaffhauser Mappe. Bd. 69 (2001), S. 55 f.
