= Oleksandr Tilte =

Ukrainian handball player

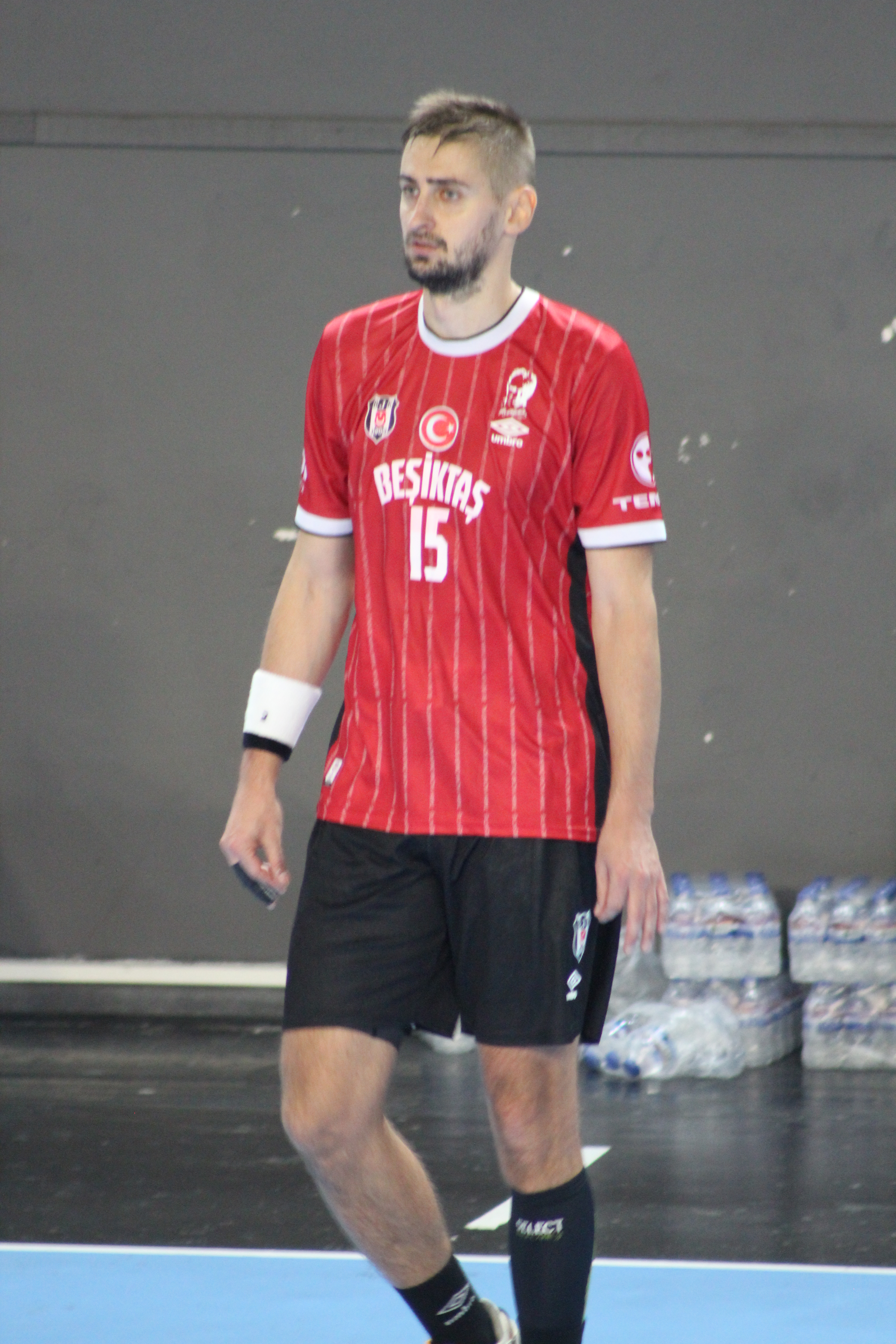

Personal information
- Nationality: Ukrainian
- Born: 10 April 1995 (age 31) Zaporizhia, Ukraine
- Height: 1.98 m (6 ft 6 in)

Sport
- Sport: Handball
- Position: Centre back
- Current club: SPR Chrobry Głogów
- Number: 15
National team
Years	Team	Apps	(Gls)
–	Ukraine	51	(99)

Oleksandr Tilte (Ukrainian: Олександр Тільте; born 10 April 1995) is a Ukrainian handball player for SPR Chrobry Głogów and the Ukrainian national team.

He represented Ukraine at the 2020 European Men's Handball Championship.
