= Danilo Brestovac =

Macedonian handball player

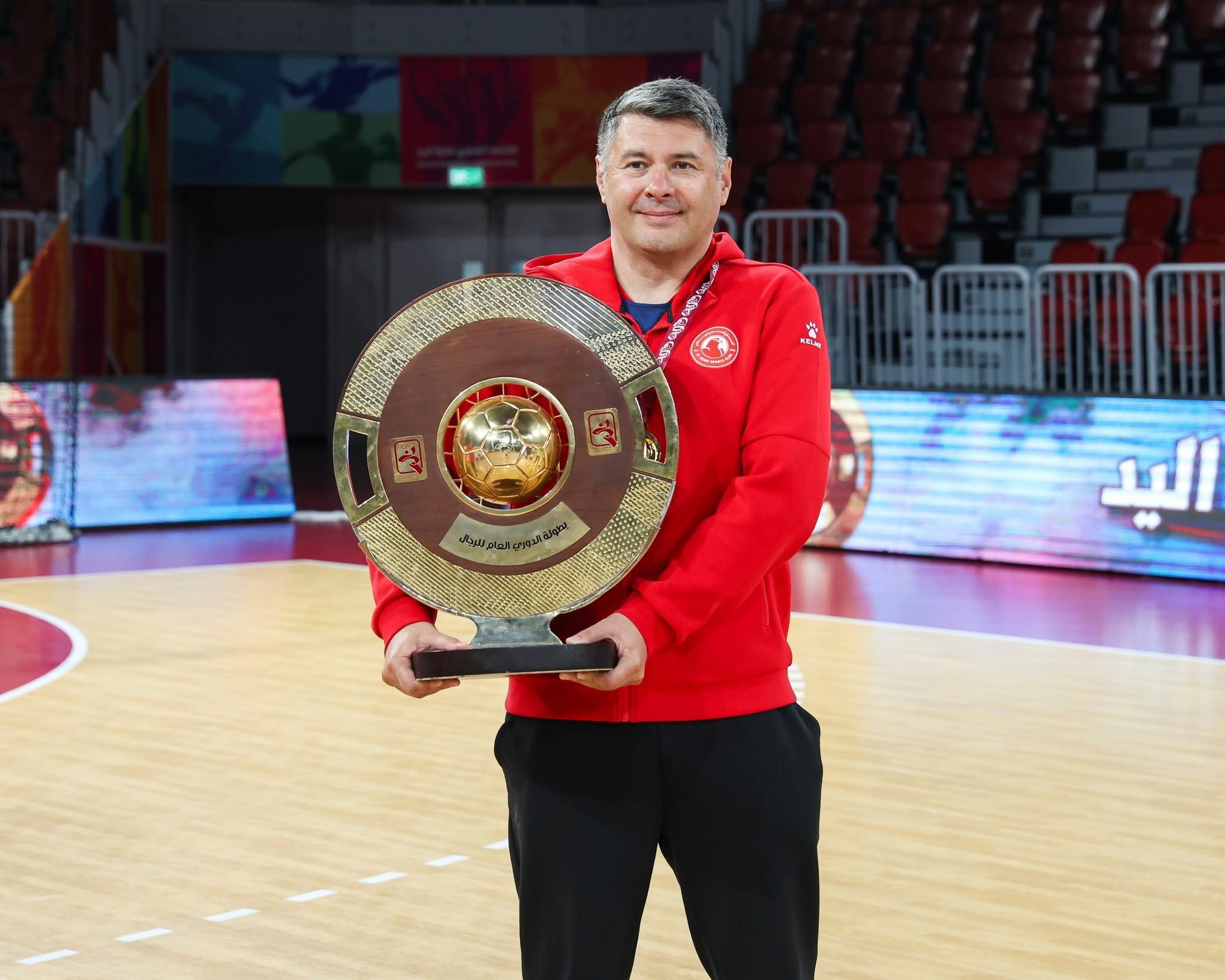
- Danilo Brestovac in 2026

Personal information
- Nationality: Macedonian
- Born: 3 February 1975 (age 51) Skopje, SR Macedonia, SFR Yugoslavia
- Height: 1.85 m (6 ft 1 in)

Sport
- Sport: Handball
- Position: Goalkeeper

Senior clubs
- Years: Team
- 1989–1991: (North Macedonia) HC Gjorche Petrov
- 1991–2001: (North Macedonia) Vardar Vatrostalna
- 2001–2002: (North Macedonia) RK Tutunski Kombinat
- 2002–2008: (France) Villefranche Beaujolais
- 2008–2013: (North Macedonia) RK Metalurg Skopje
National team
- Years: Team
- 1993–2013: Macedonia

Teams managed
- 2010–2015: (North Macedonia) RK Metalurg Skopje (assistant)
- 2014–2015: North Macedonia (assistant)
- 2015–2017: (France) Chambéry Savoie Handball (assistant)
- 2017–2018: (Luxembourg) Red Boys Differdange
- 2017–2021: (North Macedonia) Macedonia U19
- 2018–2019: (North Macedonia) RK Metalurg Skopje
- 2019–2021: North Macedonia
- 2021–2022: (Saudi Arabia) Mudhar Club
- 2022–2023: (North Macedonia) GRK Tikveš
- 2023–2024: (United Arab Emirates) UAEHF
- 2024: (Saudi Arabia) Al Safa FC
- 2024–2026: (Qatar) Al Arabi

Danilo Brestovac (Macedonian: Данило Брестовац) born 3 February 1975 is a Macedonian-French handball coach and former goalkeeper. He represented the Macedonian national team and played for clubs in North Macedonia and France. As a coach, he has managed RK Metalurg Skopje, the North Macedonia men's national handball team, and clubs and national teams in Luxembourg, Saudi Arabia, the United Arab Emirates and Qatar.

== Playing career ==
A goalkeeper, Brestovac played for HC Gjorče Petrov, HC Rabotnički, HC Vardar, HC Prilep and HC Metalurg in Macedonia, as well as Villefranche Beaujolais Handball in France. He won several Macedonian championships and domestic cups during his playing career.

At international level, Brestovac earned 110 caps for the Macedonian national team and represented Macedonia at the 1999 World Men's Handball Championship. He also played for the Macedonian national team at the 1998 European Men's Championship.

== Coaching career ==
Brestovac began his coaching career in the youth system of RK Metalurg Skopje, where he worked with the club's academy and later served as assistant coach of the senior team. During this period, Metalurg reached the quarter-finals of the EHF Champions League in both 2013 and 2014.

After serving as an assistant coach with the North Macedonia national team and French club Chambéry Savoie Handball, Brestovac became head coach of Luxembourg club Red Boys Differdange in 2017. In July 2018, he was appointed head coach of RK Metalurg Skopje, succeeding Aleksandar Jović.

In February 2019, the Handball Federation of North Macedonia appointed Brestovac as head coach of the North Macedonia men's national handball team. Prior to his appointment, he had worked with several Macedonian youth national teams and had served as an assistant coach of the senior national team.

Under Brestovac, North Macedonia qualified for the 2020 European Men's Handball Championship after finishing first in its qualification group. He also coached the national youth teams, including at the 2019 IHF Men's Youth World Championship hosted in Skopje.

Following the 2021 World Men's Handball Championship, Brestovac and the Handball Federation of North Macedonia agreed to part ways.

After leaving the national team, Brestovac coached Mudhar Club in Saudi Arabia, GRK Tikveš in North Macedonia, the United Arab Emirates men's national handball team, and Al Safa Club in Saudi Arabia. In 2024, he became head coach of Al Arabi SC of Qatar. During his two-year tenure with Al Arabi, Brestovac led the club to six domestic and regional titles. Following the conclusion of the 2025–26 season, the club and Brestovac mutually agreed to part ways.

== Honours ==
=== As assistant coach ===
- EHF Champions League quarter-finalist: 2012–13, 2013–14
- Macedonian Handball Champion 2009-10, 2010-11, 2011-12
- Macedonian Handball Cup 2009-10, 2010-11

=== As head coach ===
- Saudi Super Cup: 2021
- Saudi Handball League: 2021–22
- Qatar Handball League: 2024–25, 2025–26
- Qatar Cup: 2025–26
- President Cup: 2024–25, 2025–26
- GCC Club Championship: 2024–25
