= Gennadiy Komok =

Ukrainian handball player

Personal information
- Full name: Gennadiy Serhiyovych Komok
- Nationality: Ukrainian
- Born: 5 July 1987 (age 39) Zaporizhia, Ukraine
- Height: 1.97 m (6 ft 6 in)

Sport
- Sport: Handball
- Position: Goalkeeper
- Current club: HC Motor Zaporizhzhia
- Number: 55
National team
Years	Team	Apps	(Gls)
–	Ukraine	49	(2)

Gennadiy Komok (Ukrainian: Геннадій Сергійович Комок, born 5 July 1987) is a Ukrainian handball player for HC Motor Zaporizhzhia and the Ukrainian national team.

He represented Ukraine at the 2020 European Men's Handball Championship.
