= Alen Milosevic =

Swiss handball player (born 1989)

Personal information
- Nationality: Swiss
- Born: 24 December 1989 (age 36) Bern, Switzerland
- Height: 1.91 m (6 ft 3 in)

Sport
- Sport: Handball
- Position: Pivot
- Current club: SC DHfK Leipzig (retired)
- Number: 34

Senior clubs
- Years: Team
- –2007: Wacker Thun
- 2007–2013: BSV Bern Muri
- 2013–2022: SC DHfK Leipzig
National team
Years	Team	Apps	(Gls)
2007–2022	Switzerland	60	(124)
- Updated on 14. June 2022

Alen Milosevic (born 24 December 1989) is a Swiss former handball player who played for the Swiss national team.

He started his career at Wacker Thun before joining BSV Bern Muri in 2007. In 2013 he joined German team SC DHfK Leipzig. Here he was promoted to the Handball-Bundesliga in 2015. He retired in 2022.

He represented Switzerland, where he made his debut for the national team on 28 December 2007 against Tunisia. He played at the 2020 European Men's Handball Championship and at the 2021 World Men's Handball Championship.
