= Ivo Steins =

Dutch handball player (born 1992)

Personal information
- Nationality: Dutch
- Born: 18 July 1992 (age 34) Voerendaal, Netherlands
- Height: 1.79 m (5 ft 10 in)

Sport
- Sport: Handball
- Position: Pivot
- Current club: Limburg Lions
- Number: 18

Youth career
- Years: Team
- –: HV Gemini
- –: HV Sittardia

Senior clubs
- Years: Team
- -2008: HV Sittardia
- 2008-: Limburg Lions
National team
| Years | Team | Apps | (Gls) |
| 2015–2022 | Netherlands | 83 | (95) |

Ivo Steins (born 18 July 1992) is a Dutch handball player for Limburg Lions.

He represented the Dutch national team at the 2020 European Men's Handball Championship and 2022 European Men's Handball Championship.

He is the brother of fellow handball player Luc Steins.
