= Alfredo Quintana =

Portuguese handballer (1988–2021)

Personal information
- Full name: Alfredo Eduardo Quintana Bravo
- Nationality: Portuguese
- Born: 20 March 1988 Havana, Cuba
- Died: 26 February 2021 (aged 32) Porto, Portugal
- Height: 2.01 m (6 ft 7 in)

Sport
- Sport: Handball
- Position: Goalkeeper

Senior clubs
- Years: Team
- 2010–2021: Porto
National team
Years	Team	Apps	(Gls)
–	Cuba	23	(0)
2014–2021	Portugal	58	(9)

Alfredo Eduardo Quintana Bravo (Portuguese pronunciation: [alˈfɾeðu kĩˈtɐnɐ], Spanish: [alˈfɾeðo kinˈtana]; 20 March 1988 – 26 February 2021) was a Cuban-born Portuguese handballer who played as a goalkeeper for FC Porto and the Portugal national team.

He represented Portugal at the 2020 European Men's Handball Championship and 2021 World Men's Handball Championship. Before acquiring Portuguese nationality in 2014, he represented Cuba. He played at the 2009 World Men's Handball Championship and the 2010 Pan American Championship for Cuba.

He joined Porto in 2011 from his home country, Cuba.

== Death ==
On 22 February 2021, he suffered a cardiac arrest during a training session and fell into a coma. He was taken to São João Hospital, where he fought for his life. Four days later, he died in hospital due to complications from the cardiac arrest.

== Honours ==
Porto

- Portuguese League: 2010–11, 2011–12, 2012–13, 2013–14, 2014–15, 2018–19, 2020–21
- Portuguese Cup: 2018–19, 2020–21
- Portuguese Supercup: 2014, 2019
