= Nicolas Raemy =

Swiss handball player

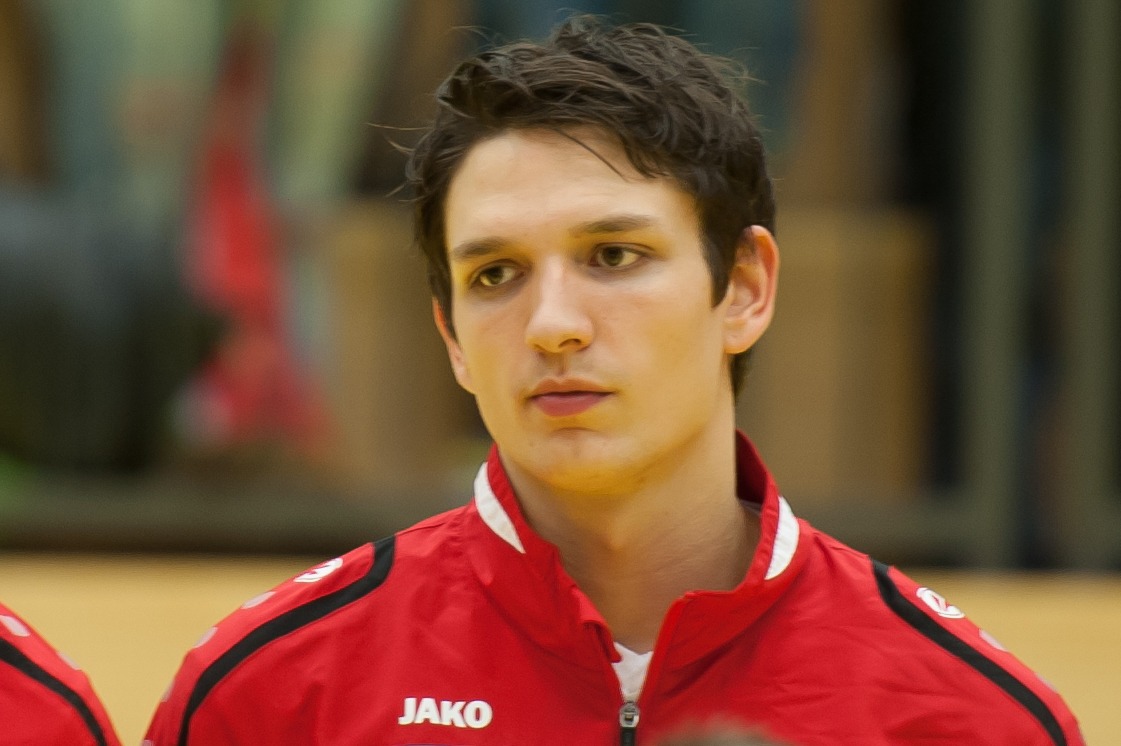
- Raemy in 2015

Personal information
- Nationality: Swiss
- Born: 25 February 1992 (age 34) Plaffeien, Switzerland
- Height: 1.86 m (6 ft 1 in)

Sport
- Sport: Handball
- Position: Right back
- Current club: Wacker Thun
- Number: 5

Youth career
- Years: Team
- –: BSV Borba Luzern
- –: SG Pilatus Handball

Senior clubs
- Years: Team
- 2010–2014: HC Kriens-Luzern
- 2014–2019: Wacker Thun
- 2019: San Francisco CalHeat THC
- 2019–2024: Wacker Thun
National team
Years	Team	Apps	(Gls)
2010-	Switzerland	87	(235)
- Updated on 27 January 2024

Nicolas Raemy (born 25 February 1992) is a Swiss handball player for Wacker Thun and the Swiss national team.

He represented Switzerland at the 2020 European Men's Handball Championship.
