= Aurel Bringolf =

Swiss handball player

Personal information
- Nationality: Swiss
- Born: 2 November 1987 (age 38) Winterthur, Switzerland
- Height: 1.90 m (6 ft 3 in)

Sport
- Sport: Handball
- Position: Goalkeeper
- Current club: TSV St. Otmar St. Gallen
- Number: 31
National team
Years	Team	Apps	(Gls)
2008-	Switzerland	82	(2)
- Updated on 15. May 2022

Aurel Bringolf (born 2 November 1987) is a Swiss handball player for TSV St. Otmar St. Gallen and the Swiss national team. He debuted for the Swiss national team on November 26th 2008 against Serbia.

He represented Switzerland at the 2020 European Men's Handball Championship.
