= Lucas von Deschwanden =

Swiss handball player

Personal information
- Nationality: Swiss
- Born: 5 June 1989 (age 37) Kerns, Switzerland
- Height: 1.92 m (6 ft 4 in)

Sport
- Sport: Handball
- Position: Centre back
- Current club: Chambéry Savoie
- Number: 41
National team
Years	Team	Apps	(Gls)
–	Switzerland	58	(177)

Lucas von Deschwanden (born 5 June 1989) is a Swiss handball player for Chambéry Savoie and the Swiss national team.

He represented Switzerland at the 2020 European Men's Handball Championship.
