= Ukraine men's national handball team =

Ukraine
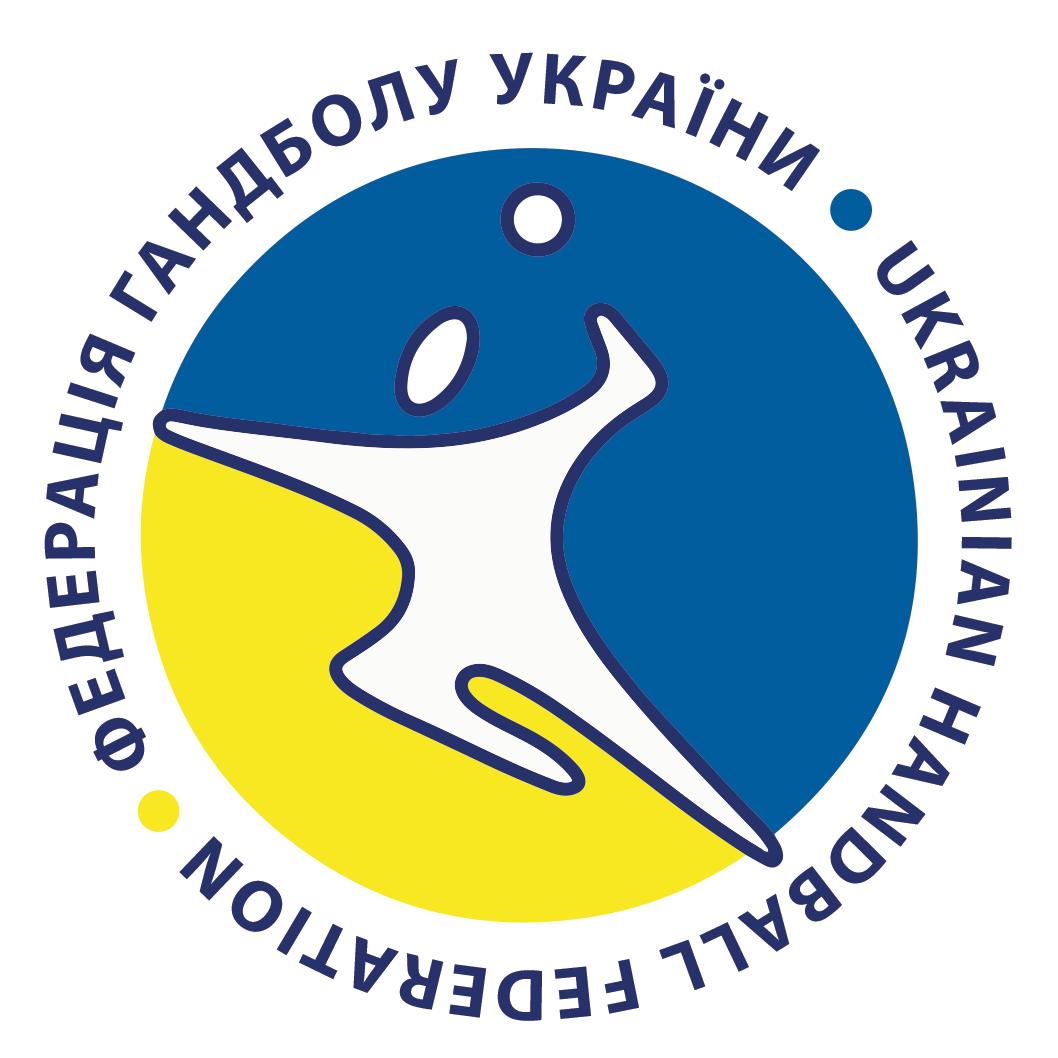

Information
- Association: Ukrainian Handball Federation
- Coach: Vadim Brazhnik
- Assistant coach: Oleksandr Dudko

Colours
1st	2nd

Results

World Championship
- Appearances: 2 (First in 2001)
- Best result: 7th (2001)

European Championship
- Appearances: 8 (First in 2000)
- Best result: 11th (2002)
- Last updated on Unknown.

The Ukraine national handball team is the national handball team of Ukraine.

== Competitive record ==
=== World Championship ===
World Championship record
Year	Round	Position	GP	W	D	L	GS	GA
(Sweden) 1993	did not qualify							
(Iceland) 1995	did not qualify							
(Japan) 1997	did not qualify							
(Egypt) 1999	did not qualify							
(France) 2001	7th/8th place	7	9	5	0	4	244	231
(Portugal) 2003	did not qualify							
(Tunisia) 2005	did not qualify							
(Germany) 2007	13th/14th place	14	6	4	0	2	168	156
(Croatia) 2009	did not qualify							
(Sweden) 2011	did not qualify							
(Spain) 2013	did not qualify							
(Qatar) 2015	did not qualify							
(France) 2017	did not qualify							
(Denmark) / (Germany) 2019	did not qualify							
(Egypt) 2021	did not qualify							
(Poland) / (Sweden) 2023	Prevented from attempting qualification due to war							
(Croatia) / (Denmark) / (Norway) 2025	did not qualify							
(Germany) 2027	did not qualify							
(France) / (Germany) 2029	TBD							
(Denmark) / (Iceland) / (Norway) 2031	TBD							
Total	2/20	–	15	9	0	6	412	387

=== European Championship ===
European Championship record
Year	Round	Position	GP	W	D	L	GS	GA
(Portugal) 1994	did not qualify							
(Spain) 1996	did not qualify							
(Italy) 1998	did not qualify							
(Croatia) 2000	Preliminary round	12	6	0	1	5	129	146
(Sweden) 2002	Second round	11	7	2	0	5	176	189
(Slovenia) 2004	Preliminary round	15	3	0	0	3	74	85
(Switzerland) 2006	Main round	12	6	1	0	5	163	193
(Norway) 2008	did not qualify							
(Austria) 2010	Preliminary round	16	3	0	0	3	87	96
(Serbia) 2012	did not qualify							
(Denmark) 2014	did not qualify							
(Poland) 2016	did not qualify							
(Croatia) 2018	did not qualify							
(Austria) / (Norway) / (Sweden) 2020	Preliminary round	19	3	0	0	3	74	83
(Hungary) / (Slovakia) 2022	Preliminary round	24	3	0	0	3	71	105
(Germany) 2024	Did not qualify							
(Denmark) (Norway) (Sweden) 2026	Preliminary round	24	3	0	0	3	77	123
(Portugal) (Spain) (Switzerland) 2028	Future event							
(Czech Republic) (Denmark) (Poland) 2030	Future event							
(France) (Germany) 2032	Future event							
Total	8/20	–	34	3	1	30	851	1020

== Current squad ==
The squad for the 2026 European Men's Handball Championship.

Head coach: Vadym Brazhnyk

No.	Pos.	Name	Date of birth (age)	Height	App.	Goals	Club
1	GK	Anton Terekhov	28 July 1992 (aged 33)	1.94 m	38	1	(Romania) CS Minaur Baia Mare
5	RW	Andrii Akimenko	12 June 1994 (age 32)	1.90 m	57	194	(Romania) Dinamo București
7	RW	Illya Blyznyuk	19 February 2001 (aged 24)	1.85 m	23	57	(Czech Republic) HCB Karviná
9	CB	Danylo Savchuk	25 June 2006 (age 20)	1.85 m	12	6	(Ukraine) CSKA Kyiv
10	P	Dmytro Tiutiunnyk	7 March 1993 (age 33)	1.98 m	31	42	(Ukraine) HC Motor Zaporizhzhia
11	LW	Zakhar Denysov	1 March 1990 (age 36)	1.87 m	61	159	(Romania) SCM Politehnica Timișoara
13	LW	Dmytro Artemenko	18 January 1996 (age 30)	1.80 m	26	101	(Poland) KS Azoty-Puławy
15	CB	Oleksandr Tilte	10 April 1995 (age 31)	1.98 m	60	133	(Turkey) Beşiktaş JK
17	LB	Ihor Tourtchenko	4 December 2000 (age 25)	1.93 m	29	156	(France) Limoges Handball
20	LW	Pavlo Savytskyi	2 March 2004 (age 22)	1.87 m	6	5	(Poland) KS Azoty-Puławy
23	P	Oleksandr Onufriyenko	28 April 2001 (age 25)	1.94 m	14	31	(Slovenia) RK Celje
25	RW	Danylo Hlushak	8 July 2000 (age 26)	1.91 m	8	9	(Romania) CSM Sighișoara
27	P	Hlushak	22 February 1998 (age 28)	2.02 m	41	51	(Poland) Ostrovia Ostrów Wielkopolski
30	LB	Maxym Strelnikov	8 January 1997 (age 29)	2.04 m	7	0	(Poland) SPR Chrobry Głogów
35	LB	Taras Minotskyi	15 January 2000 (age 26)	1.93 m	30	40	(France) Dunkerque HB
51	GK	Oleksii Novikov	16 July 1999 (aged 26)	2.02 m	8	0	(Austria) Handballclub Fivers Margareten
53	RB	Bogdan Cherkashchenko	10 September 1996 (age 30)	2.02 m	13	32	(Poland) Górnik Zabrze
55	GK	Gennadiy Komok	5 July 1987 (age 39)	1.97 m	71	2	(Romania) HC Buzău
