= 2014 European Men's Handball Championship qualification =

This article describes the qualification for the 2014 European Men's Handball Championship.

== Qualification system ==
=== Seeding ===
The draw for the qualification round was held on the 27 March 2012 at the EHF headquarters, in Vienna, Austria. Denmark as host nation and (defending champion), was directly qualified. 39 teams had registered for participation. 38 teams compete for 15 places at the final tournament in 2 distinct Qualification Phases. In each phase, the teams were divided into several pots according to their positions in the EHF National Team Ranking.

==== Seeding for Qualification Phase 1 ====
Pot 1	Pot 2	Pot 3	Pot 4
Ukraine; Greece; Romania; Estonia	Switzerland; Israel; Latvia; Cyprus	Finland; Turkey; Belgium; Italy	Luxembourg; Great Britain; Ireland; Malta

== Qualification Phase 1 ==
The games were played in a mini-tournament, hosted by one country. The group winners and the two best second-ranked teams advanced to the second phase.

=== Group 1 ===
Venue: University of Cyprus Athletic Center, Nicosia

Pos	Team	Pld	W	D	L	GF	GA	GD	Pts	Qualification
1	Ukraine	3	3	0	0	94	70	+24	6	Qualification Phase 2
2	Finland	3	1	0	2	73	69	+4	2	
3	Luxembourg	3	1	0	2	70	77	−7	2	
4	Cyprus (H)	3	1	0	2	63	84	−21	2	

(H) Hosts

All times are local (UTC+2).

8 June 2012; 17:00	Ukraine	30 – 24	Finland	Attendance: 100; Referees: Buache, Meyer (SUI)
8 June 2012; 17:00	Ostroushko 7	(15–13)	Karlsson 7	Attendance: 100; Referees: Buache, Meyer (SUI)
8 June 2012; 17:00	3× (yellow card) 6× (suspension) 1× (red card)	Report	3× (yellow card) 4× (suspension)	Attendance: 100; Referees: Buache, Meyer (SUI)

8 June 2012; 19:30	Cyprus	27 – 21	Luxembourg	Attendance: 250; Referees: Sirbu, Suponicov (MDA)
8 June 2012; 19:30	Constantinou 12	(8–10)	Sarac 4	Attendance: 250; Referees: Sirbu, Suponicov (MDA)
8 June 2012; 19:30	3× (yellow card) 4× (suspension)	Report	3× (yellow card) 4× (suspension)	Attendance: 250; Referees: Sirbu, Suponicov (MDA)

9 June 2012; 16:00	Luxembourg	24 – 27	Ukraine	Attendance: 50; Referees: Buache, Meyer (SUI)
9 June 2012; 16:00	Muller 7	(7–20)	Onufryienko 5	Attendance: 50; Referees: Buache, Meyer (SUI)
9 June 2012; 16:00	2× (yellow card) 2× (suspension)	Report	3× (yellow card) 5× (suspension)	Attendance: 50; Referees: Buache, Meyer (SUI)

9 June 2012; 18:30	Finland	26 – 14	Cyprus	Attendance: 150; Referees: Sirbu, Suponicov (MDA)
9 June 2012; 18:30	Rönnberg 6	(11–6)	Demosthenous 4	Attendance: 150; Referees: Sirbu, Suponicov (MDA)
9 June 2012; 18:30	3× (yellow card) 2× (suspension)	Report	2× (yellow card) 6× (suspension)	Attendance: 150; Referees: Sirbu, Suponicov (MDA)

10 June 2012; 16:00	Finland	23 – 25	Luxembourg	Attendance: 50; Referees: Sirbu, Suponicov (MDA)
10 June 2012; 16:00	Rönnberg 7	(8–14)	Poeckes 8	Attendance: 50; Referees: Sirbu, Suponicov (MDA)
10 June 2012; 16:00	2× (yellow card) 1× (suspension)	Report	3× (yellow card) 3× (suspension)	Attendance: 50; Referees: Sirbu, Suponicov (MDA)

10 June 2012; 18:30	Ukraine	37 – 22	Cyprus	Attendance: 200; Referees: Buache, Meyer (SUI)
10 June 2012; 18:30	Ostroushko 6	(20–10)	Nikiforou 5	Attendance: 200; Referees: Buache, Meyer (SUI)
10 June 2012; 18:30	3× (yellow card) 6× (suspension)	Report	3× (yellow card) 9× (suspension)	Attendance: 200; Referees: Buache, Meyer (SUI)

=== Group 2 ===
Venue: Palaflorio, Bari

Pos	Team	Pld	W	D	L	GF	GA	GD	Pts	Qualification
1	Switzerland	3	2	1	0	84	64	+20	5	Qualification Phase 2
2	Italy (H)	3	1	2	0	81	78	+3	4	
3	Greece	3	1	1	1	88	86	+2	3	
4	Great Britain	3	0	0	3	77	102	−25	0	

(H) Hosts

All times are local (UTC+2).

8 June 2012; 17:45	Switzerland	38 – 21	Great Britain	Attendance: 100; Referees: Samuelsen, Hansen (FRO)
8 June 2012; 17:45	Goepfert 6	(16–12)	Larsson 8	Attendance: 100; Referees: Samuelsen, Hansen (FRO)
8 June 2012; 17:45	2× (yellow card) 5× (suspension) 1× (red card)	Report	2× (yellow card) 2× (suspension)	Attendance: 100; Referees: Samuelsen, Hansen (FRO)

8 June 2012; 20:00	Greece	31 – 31	Italy	Attendance: 250; Referees: Malasinskas, Grigalionis (LTU)
8 June 2012; 20:00	Tzimourtos 12	(16–12)	Radovcic 12	Attendance: 250; Referees: Malasinskas, Grigalionis (LTU)
8 June 2012; 20:00	4× (yellow card) 6× (suspension)	Report	3× (yellow card) 7× (suspension)	Attendance: 250; Referees: Malasinskas, Grigalionis (LTU)

9 June 2012; 17:45	Great Britain	30 – 35	Greece	Attendance: 42; Referees: Malasinskas, Grigalionis (LTU)
9 June 2012; 17:45	Mohr 8	(13–21)	Georgiadis 7	Attendance: 42; Referees: Malasinskas, Grigalionis (LTU)
9 June 2012; 17:45	3× (yellow card) 2× (suspension)	Report	3× (yellow card) 3× (suspension)	Attendance: 42; Referees: Malasinskas, Grigalionis (LTU)

9 June 2012; 20:00	Italy	21 – 21	Switzerland	Attendance: 300; Referees: Samuelsen, Hansen (FRO)
9 June 2012; 20:00	Skatar 8	(10–10)	Hofstetter 5	Attendance: 300; Referees: Samuelsen, Hansen (FRO)
9 June 2012; 20:00	3× (yellow card) 1× (suspension)	Report	3× (yellow card) 4× (suspension)	Attendance: 300; Referees: Samuelsen, Hansen (FRO)

10 June 2012; 18:00	Greece	22 – 25	Switzerland	Attendance: 60; Referees: Samuelsen, Hansen (FRO)
10 June 2012; 18:00	three players 5	(11–11)	Vukelic 9	Attendance: 60; Referees: Samuelsen, Hansen (FRO)
10 June 2012; 18:00	2× (yellow card) 1× (suspension)	Report	3× (yellow card) 2× (suspension)	Attendance: 60; Referees: Samuelsen, Hansen (FRO)

10 June 2012; 20:30	Italy	29 – 26	Great Britain	Attendance: 150; Referees: Malasinskas, Grigalionis (LTU)
10 June 2012; 20:30	Skatar 8	(14–11)	Vincent 7	Attendance: 150; Referees: Malasinskas, Grigalionis (LTU)
10 June 2012; 20:30	2× (yellow card) 4× (suspension) 1× (red card)	Report	3× (yellow card) 6× (suspension) 1× (red card)	Attendance: 150; Referees: Malasinskas, Grigalionis (LTU)

=== Group 3 ===
Venue: Maccabi House Arena, Rishon LeZion

Pos	Team	Pld	W	D	L	GF	GA	GD	Pts	Qualification
1	Romania	3	3	0	0	100	55	+45	6	Qualification Phase 2
2	Israel (H)	3	2	0	1	105	64	+41	4	Qualification Phase 2
3	Belgium	3	1	0	2	87	77	+10	2	
4	Ireland	3	0	0	3	32	128	−96	0	

(H) Hosts

All times are local (UTC+3).

8 June 2012; 16:00	Israel	49 – 10	Ireland	Attendance: 300; Referees: Chaskis, Tsakonas (GRE)
8 June 2012; 16:00	Pomeranz 13	(25–6)	McAuley 4	Attendance: 300; Referees: Chaskis, Tsakonas (GRE)
8 June 2012; 16:00	3× (yellow card) 3× (suspension)	Report	3× (yellow card) 1× (suspension)	Attendance: 300; Referees: Chaskis, Tsakonas (GRE)

8 June 2012; 18:15	Romania	35 – 19	Belgium	Attendance: 100; Referees: Mishchuk, Rozhkov (UKR)
8 June 2012; 18:15	Ghiţă 8	(14–9)	Kopljar 4	Attendance: 100; Referees: Mishchuk, Rozhkov (UKR)
8 June 2012; 18:15	3× (yellow card) 3× (suspension)	Report	3× (yellow card) 3× (suspension)	Attendance: 100; Referees: Mishchuk, Rozhkov (UKR)

9 June 2012; 17:30	Ireland	11 – 39	Romania	Attendance: 100; Referees: Chaskis, Tsakonas (GRE)
9 June 2012; 17:30	Meyer 4	(6–18)	Mihalcea 8	Attendance: 100; Referees: Chaskis, Tsakonas (GRE)
9 June 2012; 17:30	3× (yellow card) 4× (suspension)	Report	3× (yellow card) 2× (suspension)	Attendance: 100; Referees: Chaskis, Tsakonas (GRE)

9 June 2012; 20:00	Belgium	28 – 31	Israel	Attendance: 600; Referees: Mishchuk, Rozhkov (UKR)
9 June 2012; 20:00	Cauwenberghs 6	(14–19)	Pomeranz 10	Attendance: 600; Referees: Mishchuk, Rozhkov (UKR)
9 June 2012; 20:00	3× (yellow card) 2× (suspension)	Report	3× (yellow card) 6× (suspension)	Attendance: 600; Referees: Mishchuk, Rozhkov (UKR)

10 June 2012; 15:30	Belgium	40 – 11	Ireland	Attendance: 20; Referees: Chaskis, Tsakonas (GRE)
10 June 2012; 15:30	Danesi 8	(18–7)	Murphy 5	Attendance: 20; Referees: Chaskis, Tsakonas (GRE)
10 June 2012; 15:30	3× (yellow card) 2× (suspension)	Report	3× (yellow card) 4× (suspension) 1× (red card)	Attendance: 20; Referees: Chaskis, Tsakonas (GRE)

10 June 2012; 18:00	Romania	26 – 25	Israel	Attendance: 750; Referees: Mishchuk, Rozhkov (UKR)
10 June 2012; 18:00	four players 4	(10–12)	Pomeranz 6	Attendance: 750; Referees: Mishchuk, Rozhkov (UKR)
10 June 2012; 18:00	3× (yellow card) 2× (suspension) 1× (red card)	Report	3× (yellow card) 2× (suspension) 1× (red card)	Attendance: 750; Referees: Mishchuk, Rozhkov (UKR)

=== Group 4 ===
Venue: Edip Buran Sport Hall, Mersin

Pos	Team	Pld	W	D	L	GF	GA	GD	Pts	Qualification
1	Turkey (H)	3	2	1	0	96	72	+24	5	Qualification Phase 2
2	Latvia	3	1	2	0	83	57	+26	4	Qualification Phase 2
3	Estonia	3	1	1	1	118	85	+33	3	
4	Malta	3	0	0	3	46	129	−83	0	

(H) Hosts

All times are local (UTC+3).

8 June 2012; 17:00	Latvia	36 – 10	Malta	Attendance: 300; Referees: Azemi, Beqiri (Kosovo)
8 June 2012; 17:00	Blūms 6	(17–4)	Said 3	Attendance: 300; Referees: Azemi, Beqiri (Kosovo)
8 June 2012; 17:00	2× (yellow card) 6× (suspension)	Report	3× (yellow card) 5× (suspension)	Attendance: 300; Referees: Azemi, Beqiri (Kosovo)

8 June 2012; 19:00	Estonia	35 – 39	Turkey	Attendance: 600; Referees: Yudchyts, Kot (BLR)
8 June 2012; 19:00	Jaanimaa 10	(14–21)	Döne 12	Attendance: 600; Referees: Yudchyts, Kot (BLR)
8 June 2012; 19:00	3× (yellow card) 4× (suspension)	Report	3× (yellow card) 7× (suspension) 1× (red card)	Attendance: 600; Referees: Yudchyts, Kot (BLR)

9 June 2012; 17:00	Malta	19 – 56	Estonia	Attendance: 200; Referees: Azemi, Beqiri (Kosovo)
9 June 2012; 17:00	Magro, Naudi 5	(8–27)	Lees 13	Attendance: 200; Referees: Azemi, Beqiri (Kosovo)
9 June 2012; 17:00	3× (yellow card) 5× (suspension) 1× (red card)	Report	3× (yellow card) 3× (suspension)	Attendance: 200; Referees: Azemi, Beqiri (Kosovo)

9 June 2012; 19:00	Turkey	20 – 20	Latvia	Attendance: 600; Referees: Yudchyts, Kot (BLR)
9 June 2012; 19:00	Asikoglu 6	(11–8)	Krištopāns 6	Attendance: 600; Referees: Yudchyts, Kot (BLR)
9 June 2012; 19:00	3× (yellow card) 5× (suspension)	Report	3× (yellow card) 8× (suspension)	Attendance: 600; Referees: Yudchyts, Kot (BLR)

10 June 2012; 17:00	Estonia	27 – 27	Latvia	Attendance: 200; Referees: Yudchyts, Kot (BLR)
10 June 2012; 17:00	Patrail 7	(12–13)	Tuminskis 8	Attendance: 200; Referees: Yudchyts, Kot (BLR)
10 June 2012; 17:00	3× (yellow card) 2× (suspension)	Report	3× (yellow card) 5× (suspension)	Attendance: 200; Referees: Yudchyts, Kot (BLR)

10 June 2012; 19:00	Turkey	37 – 17	Malta	Attendance: 700; Referees: Azemi, Beqiri (Kosovo)
10 June 2012; 19:00	three players 5	(19–8)	Said 5	Attendance: 700; Referees: Azemi, Beqiri (Kosovo)
10 June 2012; 19:00	3× (yellow card) 1× (suspension)	Report	3× (yellow card) 1× (suspension)	Attendance: 700; Referees: Azemi, Beqiri (Kosovo)

== Qualification Phase 2 ==
It was played in seven groups with four teams each, starting in October, 2012. The top two teams of each group and the best third-ranked team (when considering the matches against the first and second team) qualified.

=== Group 1 ===
Pos	Team	Pld	W	D	L	GF	GA	GD	Pts	Qualification
1	Spain	6	6	0	0	179	115	+64	12	Final tournament
2	Macedonia	6	3	0	3	142	150	−8	6	Final tournament
3	Portugal	6	2	1	3	147	166	−19	5	
4	Switzerland	6	0	1	5	135	172	−37	1	

31 October 2012; 20:00	Macedonia	30 – 24	Switzerland	Boris Trajkovski Sports Center, Skopje; Attendance: 5,000; Referees: Poulsen, Mortensen (DEN)
31 October 2012; 20:00	Stoilov 6	(17–9)	Graubner, Raemy 5	Boris Trajkovski Sports Center, Skopje; Attendance: 5,000; Referees: Poulsen, Mortensen (DEN)
31 October 2012; 20:00	3× (yellow card) 4× (suspension)	Report	3× (yellow card) 2× (suspension)	Boris Trajkovski Sports Center, Skopje; Attendance: 5,000; Referees: Poulsen, Mortensen (DEN)

1 November 2012; 12:30	Spain	34 – 20	Portugal	Palacio de Deportes San Pablo, Seville; Attendance: 5,000; Referees: Zotin, Volodkov (RUS)
1 November 2012; 12:30	Entrerrios, Rocas 6	(16–9)	Moreira 4	Palacio de Deportes San Pablo, Seville; Attendance: 5,000; Referees: Zotin, Volodkov (RUS)
1 November 2012; 12:30	3× (yellow card) 1× (suspension)	Report	3× (yellow card) 1× (suspension)	Palacio de Deportes San Pablo, Seville; Attendance: 5,000; Referees: Zotin, Volodkov (RUS)

4 November 2012; 16:00	Switzerland	22 – 33	Spain	BBC Arena, Schaffhausen; Attendance: 2,480; Referees: Pichon, Reveret (FRA)
4 November 2012; 16:00	Göpfert 5	(8–14)	Tomás 6	BBC Arena, Schaffhausen; Attendance: 2,480; Referees: Pichon, Reveret (FRA)
4 November 2012; 16:00	3× (yellow card) 3× (suspension)	Report	3× (yellow card) 4× (suspension)	BBC Arena, Schaffhausen; Attendance: 2,480; Referees: Pichon, Reveret (FRA)

4 November 2012; 17:00	Portugal	32 – 25	Macedonia	Nave Polivalente de Espinho, Espinho; Attendance: 3,500; Referees: Bonifert, Oláh (HUN)
4 November 2012; 17:00	Carneiro 8	(18–13)	Lazarov 9	Nave Polivalente de Espinho, Espinho; Attendance: 3,500; Referees: Bonifert, Oláh (HUN)
4 November 2012; 17:00	3× (yellow card) 4× (suspension)	Report	2× (yellow card) 3× (suspension)	Nave Polivalente de Espinho, Espinho; Attendance: 3,500; Referees: Bonifert, Oláh (HUN)

3 April 2013; 17:45	Macedonia	17 – 24	Spain	Boris Trajkovski Sports Center, Skopje; Attendance: 6,963; Referees: Stark, Stefan (ROU)
3 April 2013; 17:45	three players 3	(7–13)	Tomás 5	Boris Trajkovski Sports Center, Skopje; Attendance: 6,963; Referees: Stark, Stefan (ROU)
3 April 2013; 17:45	3× (yellow card) 2× (suspension)	Report	3× (yellow card) 2× (suspension)	Boris Trajkovski Sports Center, Skopje; Attendance: 6,963; Referees: Stark, Stefan (ROU)

4 April 2013; 19:30	Switzerland	26 – 26	Portugal	Kreuzbleichhalle, St. Gallen; Attendance: 2,500; Referees: Konjičanin, Konjičanin (BIH)
4 April 2013; 19:30	Schmid 7	(13–15)	three players 5	Kreuzbleichhalle, St. Gallen; Attendance: 2,500; Referees: Konjičanin, Konjičanin (BIH)
4 April 2013; 19:30	2× (yellow card) 4× (suspension)	Report	3× (yellow card) 4× (suspension)	Kreuzbleichhalle, St. Gallen; Attendance: 2,500; Referees: Konjičanin, Konjičanin (BIH)

7 April 2013; 12:30	Spain	29 – 17	Macedonia	Polideportivo Municipal Aguas Vivas, Guadalajara; Attendance: 3,600; Referees: Fleisch, Rieber (GER)
7 April 2013; 12:30	Rivera 7	(12–8)	Ojleski 4	Polideportivo Municipal Aguas Vivas, Guadalajara; Attendance: 3,600; Referees: Fleisch, Rieber (GER)
7 April 2013; 12:30	3× (yellow card) 1× (suspension)	Report	3× (yellow card) 4× (suspension)	Polideportivo Municipal Aguas Vivas, Guadalajara; Attendance: 3,600; Referees: Fleisch, Rieber (GER)

7 April 2013; 17:00	Portugal	27 – 25	Switzerland	Pavilhão Desportivo Municipal, Santo Tirso; Attendance: 2,000; Referees: Johansson, Kliko (SWE)
7 April 2013; 17:00	Solha, Spínola 5	(14–14)	Schmid 8	Pavilhão Desportivo Municipal, Santo Tirso; Attendance: 2,000; Referees: Johansson, Kliko (SWE)
7 April 2013; 17:00	3× (yellow card) 5× (suspension) 1× (red card)	Report	3× (yellow card) 7× (suspension) 1× (red card)	Pavilhão Desportivo Municipal, Santo Tirso; Attendance: 2,000; Referees: Johansson, Kliko (SWE)

12 June 2013; 20:00	Switzerland	22 – 27	Macedonia	Saalsporthalle, Zürich; Attendance: 1,850; Referees: Dentz, Reibel (FRA)
12 June 2013; 20:00	Kurth, Svajlen 4	(11–12)	Mojsovski 9	Saalsporthalle, Zürich; Attendance: 1,850; Referees: Dentz, Reibel (FRA)
12 June 2013; 20:00	2× (yellow card) 3× (suspension)	Report	3× (yellow card) 2× (suspension)	Saalsporthalle, Zürich; Attendance: 1,850; Referees: Dentz, Reibel (FRA)

12 June 2013; 21:30	Portugal	23 – 30	Spain	Pavilhão Multiusos, Guimarães; Attendance: 3,842; Referees: Geipel, Helbig (GER)
12 June 2013; 21:30	Solha, Spínola 5	(12–14)	Entrerríos 7	Pavilhão Multiusos, Guimarães; Attendance: 3,842; Referees: Geipel, Helbig (GER)
12 June 2013; 21:30	3× (yellow card) 2× (suspension)	Report	3× (yellow card)	Pavilhão Multiusos, Guimarães; Attendance: 3,842; Referees: Geipel, Helbig (GER)

16 June 2013; 13:00	Spain	29 – 16	Switzerland	León Arena, León; Attendance: 4,650; Referees: Jurinović, Mrvica (CRO)
16 June 2013; 13:00	Entrerríos, Robledo 4	(13–6)	Kurth, Milosevic 3	León Arena, León; Attendance: 4,650; Referees: Jurinović, Mrvica (CRO)
16 June 2013; 13:00	1× (yellow card) 2× (suspension)	Report	3× (yellow card) 1× (suspension)	León Arena, León; Attendance: 4,650; Referees: Jurinović, Mrvica (CRO)

16 June 2013; 20:30	Macedonia	26 – 19	Portugal	Boris Trajkovski Sports Center, Skopje; Attendance: 6,963; Referees: Abrahamsen, Kristiansen (NOR)
16 June 2013; 20:30	Lazarov 9	(14–10)	Ferraz, Pedro Solha 6	Boris Trajkovski Sports Center, Skopje; Attendance: 6,963; Referees: Abrahamsen, Kristiansen (NOR)
16 June 2013; 20:30	3× (yellow card) 1× (suspension)	Report	3× (yellow card) 2× (suspension)	Boris Trajkovski Sports Center, Skopje; Attendance: 6,963; Referees: Abrahamsen, Kristiansen (NOR)

=== Group 2 ===
Pos	Team	Pld	W	D	L	GF	GA	GD	Pts	Qualification
1	Czech Republic	6	4	0	2	156	144	+12	8	Final tournament
2	Montenegro	6	4	0	2	160	160	0	8	Final tournament
3	Germany	6	3	0	3	170	151	+19	6	
4	Israel	6	1	0	5	148	179	−31	2	

31 October 2012; 18:00	Czech Republic	27 – 22	Israel	Sportovní hala Euronics, Zlín; Attendance: 2,000; Referees: Togstad, Kristiansen (NOR)
31 October 2012; 18:00	Jícha 7	(14–10)	Pomeranz 6	Sportovní hala Euronics, Zlín; Attendance: 2,000; Referees: Togstad, Kristiansen (NOR)
31 October 2012; 18:00	3× (yellow card) 2× (suspension)	Report	3× (yellow card) 3× (suspension)	Sportovní hala Euronics, Zlín; Attendance: 2,000; Referees: Togstad, Kristiansen (NOR)

1 November 2012; 19:00	Germany	27 – 31	Montenegro	SAP Arena, Mannheim; Attendance: 7,247; Referees: López, Ramírez (ESP)
1 November 2012; 19:00	Wiencek 6	(11–17)	Mrvaljević 8	SAP Arena, Mannheim; Attendance: 7,247; Referees: López, Ramírez (ESP)
1 November 2012; 19:00	2× (yellow card) 2× (suspension)	Report	3× (yellow card) 4× (suspension) 1× (red card)	SAP Arena, Mannheim; Attendance: 7,247; Referees: López, Ramírez (ESP)

4 November 2012; 17:00	Montenegro	23 – 22	Czech Republic	Sportska Dvorana Topolica, Bar; Attendance: 3,000; Referees: Erdoğan, Özdeniz (TUR)
4 November 2012; 17:00	Roganović 5	(12–13)	Jícha 8	Sportska Dvorana Topolica, Bar; Attendance: 3,000; Referees: Erdoğan, Özdeniz (TUR)
4 November 2012; 17:00	3× (yellow card) 4× (suspension)	Report	3× (yellow card) 4× (suspension)	Sportska Dvorana Topolica, Bar; Attendance: 3,000; Referees: Erdoğan, Özdeniz (TUR)

4 November 2012; 19:45	Israel	27 – 30	Germany	Maccabi House Arena, Rishon LeZion; Attendance: 1,100; Referees: Dentz, Reibel (FRA)
4 November 2012; 19:45	Pomeranz 9	(14–13)	Christophersen 7	Maccabi House Arena, Rishon LeZion; Attendance: 1,100; Referees: Dentz, Reibel (FRA)
4 November 2012; 19:45	3× (yellow card) 3× (suspension)	Report	3× (yellow card) 5× (suspension)	Maccabi House Arena, Rishon LeZion; Attendance: 1,100; Referees: Dentz, Reibel (FRA)

3 April 2013; 18:00	Montenegro	29 – 28	Israel	Morača Sports Center, Podgorica; Attendance: 3,000; Referees: Pichon, Reveret (FRA)
3 April 2013; 18:00	Mrvaljević 7	(12–15)	three players 6	Morača Sports Center, Podgorica; Attendance: 3,000; Referees: Pichon, Reveret (FRA)
3 April 2013; 18:00	2× (yellow card) 3× (suspension)	Report	3× (yellow card) 3× (suspension)	Morača Sports Center, Podgorica; Attendance: 3,000; Referees: Pichon, Reveret (FRA)

4 April 2013; 17:00	Czech Republic	24 – 22	Germany	Sportovní hala Vodova, Brno; Attendance: 3,500; Referees: Gubica, Milošević (CRO)
4 April 2013; 17:00	Jícha 10	(10–10)	Weinhold 9	Sportovní hala Vodova, Brno; Attendance: 3,500; Referees: Gubica, Milošević (CRO)
4 April 2013; 17:00	2× (yellow card) 3× (suspension)	Report	3× (yellow card) 2× (suspension) 1× (red card)	Sportovní hala Vodova, Brno; Attendance: 3,500; Referees: Gubica, Milošević (CRO)

6 April 2013; 19:30	Israel	28 – 25	Montenegro	Maccabi House Arena, Rishon LeZion; Attendance: 1,000; Referees: Dinu, Dinu (ROU)
6 April 2013; 19:30	Smoler 10	(11–12)	Marković 12	Maccabi House Arena, Rishon LeZion; Attendance: 1,000; Referees: Dinu, Dinu (ROU)
6 April 2013; 19:30	3× (yellow card) 1× (suspension)	Report	3× (yellow card) 4× (suspension)	Maccabi House Arena, Rishon LeZion; Attendance: 1,000; Referees: Dinu, Dinu (ROU)

7 April 2013; 14:20	Germany	28 – 23	Czech Republic	Gerry Weber Stadion, Halle; Attendance: 9,500; Referees: Leifsson, Pálsson (ISL)
7 April 2013; 14:20	Christophersen, Weinhold 6	(15–12)	Jícha 8	Gerry Weber Stadion, Halle; Attendance: 9,500; Referees: Leifsson, Pálsson (ISL)
7 April 2013; 14:20	2× (yellow card) 2× (suspension)	Report	2× (yellow card) 5× (suspension)	Gerry Weber Stadion, Halle; Attendance: 9,500; Referees: Leifsson, Pálsson (ISL)

12 June 2013; 19:30	Israel	24 – 30	Czech Republic	Maccabi House Arena, Rishon LeZion; Attendance: 1,100; Referees: Kékes, Kékes (HUN)
12 June 2013; 19:30	Pomeranz 10	(11–13)	Sobol 6	Maccabi House Arena, Rishon LeZion; Attendance: 1,100; Referees: Kékes, Kékes (HUN)
12 June 2013; 19:30	3× (yellow card) 4× (suspension)	Report	3× (yellow card) 6× (suspension)	Maccabi House Arena, Rishon LeZion; Attendance: 1,100; Referees: Kékes, Kékes (HUN)

12 June 2013; 20:00	Montenegro	27 – 25	Germany	Morača Sports Center, Podgorica; Attendance: 3,000; Referees: Zotin, Volodkov (RUS)
12 June 2013; 20:00	Grbović 7	(13–11)	Wiencek 5	Morača Sports Center, Podgorica; Attendance: 3,000; Referees: Zotin, Volodkov (RUS)
12 June 2013; 20:00	3× (yellow card) 4× (suspension)	Report	3× (yellow card) 2× (suspension)	Morača Sports Center, Podgorica; Attendance: 3,000; Referees: Zotin, Volodkov (RUS)

15 June 2013; 14:00	Germany	38 – 19	Israel	F.a.n. Frankenstolz Arena Aschaffenburg; Attendance: 3,875; Referees: Hakansson, Nilsson (SWE)
15 June 2013; 14:00	Groetzki 10	(21–12)	Pomeranz 6	F.a.n. Frankenstolz Arena Aschaffenburg; Attendance: 3,875; Referees: Hakansson, Nilsson (SWE)
15 June 2013; 14:00	3× (yellow card) 3× (suspension)	Report	2× (yellow card) 3× (suspension)	F.a.n. Frankenstolz Arena Aschaffenburg; Attendance: 3,875; Referees: Hakansson, Nilsson (SWE)

15 June 2013; 14:00	Czech Republic	30 – 25	Montenegro	Sportovní hala Vodova, Brno; Attendance: 2,500; Referees: Dobrovits, Tájok (HUN)
15 June 2013; 14:00	Jícha 10	(16–9)	Ševaljević 9	Sportovní hala Vodova, Brno; Attendance: 2,500; Referees: Dobrovits, Tájok (HUN)
15 June 2013; 14:00	3× (yellow card) 5× (suspension)	Report	1× (yellow card) 5× (suspension)	Sportovní hala Vodova, Brno; Attendance: 2,500; Referees: Dobrovits, Tájok (HUN)

=== Group 3 ===
Pos	Team	Pld	W	D	L	GF	GA	GD	Pts	Qualification
1	France	6	6	0	0	177	134	+43	12	Final tournament
2	Norway	6	4	0	2	185	154	+31	8	Final tournament
3	Lithuania	6	1	0	5	145	164	−19	2	
4	Turkey	6	1	0	5	136	191	−55	2	

31 October 2012; 19:10	Norway	41 – 23	Turkey	Stjørdalshallen, Stjørdal; Attendance: 2,788; Referees: Lorente, Serradilla (ESP)
31 October 2012; 19:10	Bjørnsen 10	(18–12)	Catkin 5	Stjørdalshallen, Stjørdal; Attendance: 2,788; Referees: Lorente, Serradilla (ESP)
31 October 2012; 19:10	3× (yellow card) 2× (suspension)	Report	3× (yellow card) 5× (suspension)	Stjørdalshallen, Stjørdal; Attendance: 2,788; Referees: Lorente, Serradilla (ESP)

1 November 2012; 19:00	France	27 – 18	Lithuania	Kindarena, Rouen; Attendance: 5,400; Referees: Hakansson, Nilsson (SWE)
1 November 2012; 19:00	Joli 5	(14–11)	Malašinskas, Strazdas 3	Kindarena, Rouen; Attendance: 5,400; Referees: Hakansson, Nilsson (SWE)
1 November 2012; 19:00	2× (yellow card) 2× (suspension)	Report	3× (yellow card) 3× (suspension)	Kindarena, Rouen; Attendance: 5,400; Referees: Hakansson, Nilsson (SWE)

4 November 2012; 16:15	Lithuania	21 – 28	Norway	Kaunas Sports Hall, Kaunas; Attendance: 2,143; Referees: Baranowski, Lemanowicz (POL)
4 November 2012; 16:15	Grosas 6	(8–15)	Hykkerud 6	Kaunas Sports Hall, Kaunas; Attendance: 2,143; Referees: Baranowski, Lemanowicz (POL)
4 November 2012; 16:15	3× (yellow card) 7× (suspension)	Report	3× (yellow card) 5× (suspension)	Kaunas Sports Hall, Kaunas; Attendance: 2,143; Referees: Baranowski, Lemanowicz (POL)

4 November 2012; 19:00	Turkey	20 – 33	France	Edip Buran Sport Hall, Mersin; Attendance: 1,000; Referees: Kiyashko, Kiselev (RUS)
4 November 2012; 19:00	Arifoğlu 5	(7–17)	Joli 6	Edip Buran Sport Hall, Mersin; Attendance: 1,000; Referees: Kiyashko, Kiselev (RUS)
4 November 2012; 19:00	3× (yellow card) 5× (suspension)	Report	2× (yellow card) 3× (suspension)	Edip Buran Sport Hall, Mersin; Attendance: 1,000; Referees: Kiyashko, Kiselev (RUS)

3 April 2013; 18:00	Turkey	27 – 26	Lithuania	THF Sport Hall, Çankaya, Ankara; Attendance: 500; Referees: Jurinović, Mrvica (CRO)
3 April 2013; 18:00	Döne 11	(12–11)	Eitutis 8	THF Sport Hall, Çankaya, Ankara; Attendance: 500; Referees: Jurinović, Mrvica (CRO)
3 April 2013; 18:00	2× (yellow card) 4× (suspension) 1× (red card)	Report	3× (yellow card) 3× (suspension)	THF Sport Hall, Çankaya, Ankara; Attendance: 500; Referees: Jurinović, Mrvica (CRO)

3 April 2013; 19:10	Norway	22 – 29	France	Stavanger Idrettshall, Stavanger; Attendance: 6,000; Referees: Horáček, Novotný (CZE)
3 April 2013; 19:10	Myrhol 8	(12–12)	Abalo 6	Stavanger Idrettshall, Stavanger; Attendance: 6,000; Referees: Horáček, Novotný (CZE)
3 April 2013; 19:10	3× (yellow card) 1× (suspension)	Report	3× (yellow card) 2× (suspension)	Stavanger Idrettshall, Stavanger; Attendance: 6,000; Referees: Horáček, Novotný (CZE)

6 April 2013; 18:30	France	32 – 28	Norway	Palais des Sports Jean Weille, Nancy; Attendance: 5,500; Referees: López, Ramírez (ESP)
6 April 2013; 18:30	Karabatić, Nyokas 7	(17–12)	Hansen 6	Palais des Sports Jean Weille, Nancy; Attendance: 5,500; Referees: López, Ramírez (ESP)
6 April 2013; 18:30	1× (yellow card) 2× (suspension)	Report	3× (yellow card) 3× (suspension)	Palais des Sports Jean Weille, Nancy; Attendance: 5,500; Referees: López, Ramírez (ESP)

7 April 2013; 16:15	Lithuania	28 – 23	Turkey	Siemens Arena, Vilnius; Attendance: 2,000; Referees: Vešović, Mitrović (MNE)
7 April 2013; 16:15	Čepulis, Grosas 4	(17–13)	Döne 10	Siemens Arena, Vilnius; Attendance: 2,000; Referees: Vešović, Mitrović (MNE)
7 April 2013; 16:15	3× (yellow card) 4× (suspension)	Report	3× (yellow card) 5× (suspension)	Siemens Arena, Vilnius; Attendance: 2,000; Referees: Vešović, Mitrović (MNE)

12 June 2013; 18:45	Lithuania	23 – 25	France	Siemens Arena, Vilnius; Attendance: 2,000; Referees: Wyss, Zowa (SUI)
12 June 2013; 18:45	Malašinskas 6	(13–14)	Karabatić, Abalo 5	Siemens Arena, Vilnius; Attendance: 2,000; Referees: Wyss, Zowa (SUI)
12 June 2013; 18:45	2× (yellow card) 4× (suspension)	Report	2× (yellow card) 5× (suspension)	Siemens Arena, Vilnius; Attendance: 2,000; Referees: Wyss, Zowa (SUI)

12 June 2013; 19:00	Turkey	20 – 32	Norway	Serinevler Sports Hall, Adana; Attendance: 2,800; Referees: Dinu, Din (ROU)
12 June 2013; 19:00	Celebi, Özbahar 5	(13–13)	Hansen, Tvedten 5	Serinevler Sports Hall, Adana; Attendance: 2,800; Referees: Dinu, Din (ROU)
12 June 2013; 19:00	3× (yellow card) 6× (suspension)	Report	3× (yellow card) 6× (suspension)	Serinevler Sports Hall, Adana; Attendance: 2,800; Referees: Dinu, Din (ROU)

15 June 2013; 15:00	France	31 – 23	Turkey	Clermont-Ferrand Sports Hall, Clermont-Ferrand; Attendance: 4,488; Referees: Cohen, Peretz (ISR)
15 June 2013; 15:00	Guigou 6	(17–10)	Döne 9	Clermont-Ferrand Sports Hall, Clermont-Ferrand; Attendance: 4,488; Referees: Cohen, Peretz (ISR)
15 June 2013; 15:00	3× (yellow card) 4× (suspension)	Report	3× (yellow card) 5× (suspension) 1× (red card)	Clermont-Ferrand Sports Hall, Clermont-Ferrand; Attendance: 4,488; Referees: Cohen, Peretz (ISR)

15 June 2013; 19:10	Norway	34 – 29	Lithuania	Sør Arena, Arendal; Attendance: 2,625; Referees: Baďura, Ondogrecula (SVK)
15 June 2013; 19:10	Paulsen 6	(22–15)	Babarskas 7	Sør Arena, Arendal; Attendance: 2,625; Referees: Baďura, Ondogrecula (SVK)
15 June 2013; 19:10	3× (yellow card) 5× (suspension)	Report	3× (yellow card) 6× (suspension) 2× (red card)	Sør Arena, Arendal; Attendance: 2,625; Referees: Baďura, Ondogrecula (SVK)

=== Group 4 ===
Pos	Team	Pld	W	D	L	GF	GA	GD	Pts	Qualification
1	Croatia	6	5	0	1	161	135	+26	10	Final tournament
2	Hungary	6	3	1	2	161	153	+8	7	Final tournament
3	Slovakia	6	2	0	4	148	168	−20	4	
4	Latvia	6	1	1	4	150	164	−14	3	

31 October 2012; 18:00	Croatia	25 – 21	Slovakia	Gradski vrt Hall, Osijek; Attendance: 3,500; Referees: Gousko, Repkin (BLR)
31 October 2012; 18:00	Čupić 8	(13–8)	Rábek 5	Gradski vrt Hall, Osijek; Attendance: 3,500; Referees: Gousko, Repkin (BLR)
31 October 2012; 18:00	3× (yellow card) 1× (suspension) 1× (red card)	Report	3× (yellow card) 4× (suspension)	Gradski vrt Hall, Osijek; Attendance: 3,500; Referees: Gousko, Repkin (BLR)

31 October 2012; 18:45	Hungary	32 – 25	Latvia	Gyöngyösi Sportcsarnok, Gyöngyös; Attendance: 1,500; Referees: Johansson, Kliko (SWE)
31 October 2012; 18:45	Császár 6	(18–14)	Krištopāns 6	Gyöngyösi Sportcsarnok, Gyöngyös; Attendance: 1,500; Referees: Johansson, Kliko (SWE)
31 October 2012; 18:45	3× (yellow card) 5× (suspension)	Report	3× (yellow card) 6× (suspension)	Gyöngyösi Sportcsarnok, Gyöngyös; Attendance: 1,500; Referees: Johansson, Kliko (SWE)

3 November 2012; 19:05	Latvia	23 – 30	Croatia	Sports Centre Dobele, Dobele; Attendance: 915; Referees: Brkic, Jusufhodzic (AUT)
3 November 2012; 19:05	Krištopāns 5	(12–19)	Čupić 6	Sports Centre Dobele, Dobele; Attendance: 915; Referees: Brkic, Jusufhodzic (AUT)
3 November 2012; 19:05	3× (yellow card) 4× (suspension)	Report	2× (yellow card) 2× (suspension)	Sports Centre Dobele, Dobele; Attendance: 915; Referees: Brkic, Jusufhodzic (AUT)

4 November 2012; 17:00	Slovakia	24 – 28	Hungary	City Hall Prešov, Prešov; Attendance: 4,500; Referees: Nikolić, Stojković (SRB)
4 November 2012; 17:00	Rábek 5	(12–13)	Nagy 8	City Hall Prešov, Prešov; Attendance: 4,500; Referees: Nikolić, Stojković (SRB)
4 November 2012; 17:00	3× (yellow card) 7× (suspension)	Report	3× (yellow card) 5× (suspension) 1× (red card)	City Hall Prešov, Prešov; Attendance: 4,500; Referees: Nikolić, Stojković (SRB)

3 April 2013; 19:05	Latvia	28 – 24	Slovakia	Sports Centre Dobele, Dobele; Attendance: 1,010; Referees: Covalciuc, Covalciuc (MDA)
3 April 2013; 19:05	Dude 7	(14–9)	Straňovský 11	Sports Centre Dobele, Dobele; Attendance: 1,010; Referees: Covalciuc, Covalciuc (MDA)
3 April 2013; 19:05	2× (yellow card) 5× (suspension) 1× (red card)	Report	3× (yellow card) 2× (suspension)	Sports Centre Dobele, Dobele; Attendance: 1,010; Referees: Covalciuc, Covalciuc (MDA)

4 April 2013; 20:25	Hungary	20 – 18	Croatia	Veszprém Aréna, Veszprém; Attendance: 5,000; Referees: Abrahamsen, Kristiansen (NOR)
4 April 2013; 20:25	Császár 6	(8–7)	Horvat, Buntić 4	Veszprém Aréna, Veszprém; Attendance: 5,000; Referees: Abrahamsen, Kristiansen (NOR)
4 April 2013; 20:25	2× (yellow card) 5× (suspension) 1× (red card)	Report	3× (yellow card) 3× (suspension)	Veszprém Aréna, Veszprém; Attendance: 5,000; Referees: Abrahamsen, Kristiansen (NOR)

6 April 2013; 18:30	Croatia	30 – 26	Hungary	Arena Zagreb, Zagreb; Attendance: 12,500; Referees: Zotin, Volodkov (RUS)
6 April 2013; 18:30	Horvat 8	(15–9)	Zdolik 6	Arena Zagreb, Zagreb; Attendance: 12,500; Referees: Zotin, Volodkov (RUS)
6 April 2013; 18:30	3× (yellow card) 1× (suspension)	Report	3× (yellow card) 2× (suspension)	Arena Zagreb, Zagreb; Attendance: 12,500; Referees: Zotin, Volodkov (RUS)

7 April 2013; 17:30	Slovakia	27 – 25	Latvia	Športová Hala, Považská Bystrica; Attendance: 1,400; Referees: Samuelsen, Hansen (FRO)
7 April 2013; 17:30	Straňovský 8	(12–14)	Jurdzs 8	Športová Hala, Považská Bystrica; Attendance: 1,400; Referees: Samuelsen, Hansen (FRO)
7 April 2013; 17:30	2× (yellow card) 2× (suspension) 1× (red card)	Report	3× (yellow card) 1× (suspension)	Športová Hala, Považská Bystrica; Attendance: 1,400; Referees: Samuelsen, Hansen (FRO)

12 June 2013; 19:05	Latvia	25 – 25	Hungary	Sports Centre Dobele, Dobele; Attendance: 800; Referees: Pavel, State (ROU)
12 June 2013; 19:05	Jurdžs 7	(12–11)	Nagy 9	Sports Centre Dobele, Dobele; Attendance: 800; Referees: Pavel, State (ROU)
12 June 2013; 19:05	2× (yellow card) 2× (suspension)	Report	2× (yellow card) 4× (suspension)	Sports Centre Dobele, Dobele; Attendance: 800; Referees: Pavel, State (ROU)

12 June 2013; 20:30	Slovakia	21 – 32	Croatia	Hant Arena, Bratislava; Attendance: 3,750; Referees: Baranowski, Lemanowicz (POL)
12 June 2013; 20:30	Straňovský 6	(11–21)	Štrlek 6	Hant Arena, Bratislava; Attendance: 3,750; Referees: Baranowski, Lemanowicz (POL)
12 June 2013; 20:30	3× (yellow card) 5× (suspension)	Report	3× (yellow card) 4× (suspension)	Hant Arena, Bratislava; Attendance: 3,750; Referees: Baranowski, Lemanowicz (POL)

15 June 2013; 18:00	Croatia	26 – 24	Latvia	Sporthall Umag, Umag; Attendance: 1,300; Referees: San José, Murcia (ESP)
15 June 2013; 18:00	three players 5	(17–13)	Jurdzs, Krištopāns 4	Sporthall Umag, Umag; Attendance: 1,300; Referees: San José, Murcia (ESP)
15 June 2013; 18:00	2× (yellow card) 5× (suspension)	Report	3× (yellow card) 4× (suspension)	Sporthall Umag, Umag; Attendance: 1,300; Referees: San José, Murcia (ESP)

15 June 2013; 19:00	Hungary	30 – 31	Slovakia	Városi Sportcsarnok, Szeged; Attendance: 2,000; Referees: Caçador, Nicolau (POR)
15 June 2013; 19:00	Császár 7	(16–15)	Šulc 8	Városi Sportcsarnok, Szeged; Attendance: 2,000; Referees: Caçador, Nicolau (POR)
15 June 2013; 19:00	3× (yellow card) 2× (suspension)	Report	3× (yellow card) 4× (suspension)	Városi Sportcsarnok, Szeged; Attendance: 2,000; Referees: Caçador, Nicolau (POR)

=== Group 5 ===
Pos	Team	Pld	W	D	L	GF	GA	GD	Pts	Qualification
1	Sweden	6	5	0	1	174	141	+33	10	Final tournament
2	Poland	6	5	0	1	162	133	+29	10	Final tournament
3	Netherlands	6	1	0	5	150	181	−31	2	
4	Ukraine	6	1	0	5	137	168	−31	2	

31 October 2012; 18:00	Poland	33 – 22	Netherlands	Orlen Arena, Płock; Attendance: 5,467; Referees: Pandžić, Šatordžija (BIH)
31 October 2012; 18:00	Jurecki 5	(16–8)	Haenen 6	Orlen Arena, Płock; Attendance: 5,467; Referees: Pandžić, Šatordžija (BIH)
31 October 2012; 18:00	3× (yellow card) 5× (suspension)	Report	3× (yellow card) 5× (suspension)	Orlen Arena, Płock; Attendance: 5,467; Referees: Pandžić, Šatordžija (BIH)

1 November 2012; 19:15	Sweden	27 – 23	Ukraine	Färs och Frosta Sparbank Arena, Lund; Attendance: 2,832; Referees: Pavićević, Ražnatović (MNE)
1 November 2012; 19:15	Ekberg, Jakobsson 6	(14–11)	Ostroushko 5	Färs och Frosta Sparbank Arena, Lund; Attendance: 2,832; Referees: Pavićević, Ražnatović (MNE)
1 November 2012; 19:15	3× (yellow card) 1× (suspension)	Report	3× (yellow card) 3× (suspension) 1× (red card)	Färs och Frosta Sparbank Arena, Lund; Attendance: 2,832; Referees: Pavićević, Ražnatović (MNE)

3 November 2012; 19:30	Netherlands	31 – 33	Sweden	Topsportcentrum Almere, Almere; Attendance: 900; Referees: Lillepea, Kull (EST)
3 November 2012; 19:30	Adams 9	(15–17)	Ekberg 8	Topsportcentrum Almere, Almere; Attendance: 900; Referees: Lillepea, Kull (EST)
3 November 2012; 19:30	3× (yellow card) 3× (suspension)	Report	3× (yellow card) 3× (suspension)	Topsportcentrum Almere, Almere; Attendance: 900; Referees: Lillepea, Kull (EST)

4 November 2012; 17:00	Ukraine	20 – 29	Poland	Palace of Sports Yunost, Zaporizhzhia; Attendance: 2,000; Referees: Baďura, Ondogrecula (SVK)
4 November 2012; 17:00	Stetsyura 5	(11–17)	Jurecki 6	Palace of Sports Yunost, Zaporizhzhia; Attendance: 2,000; Referees: Baďura, Ondogrecula (SVK)
4 November 2012; 17:00	3× (yellow card) 7× (suspension) 1× (red card)	Report	2× (yellow card) 4× (suspension)	Palace of Sports Yunost, Zaporizhzhia; Attendance: 2,000; Referees: Baďura, Ondogrecula (SVK)

2 April 2013; 19:00	Ukraine	28 – 24	Netherlands	Palace of Sports, Kyiv; Attendance: 2,500; Referees: Buache, Meyer (SUI)
2 April 2013; 19:00	Onufrienko, Ostroushko 5	(16–10)	Remer 5	Palace of Sports, Kyiv; Attendance: 2,500; Referees: Buache, Meyer (SUI)
2 April 2013; 19:00	3× (yellow card) 4× (suspension)	Report	3× (yellow card) 4× (suspension) 1× (red card)	Palace of Sports, Kyiv; Attendance: 2,500; Referees: Buache, Meyer (SUI)

4 April 2013; 19:10	Sweden	28 – 21	Poland	Malmö Arena, Malmö; Attendance: 7,423; Referees: Krstić, Ljubić (SLO)
4 April 2013; 19:10	Nilsson 7	(12–11)	Bielecki 5	Malmö Arena, Malmö; Attendance: 7,423; Referees: Krstić, Ljubić (SLO)
4 April 2013; 19:10	3× (yellow card) 5× (suspension)	Report	3× (yellow card) 5× (suspension)	Malmö Arena, Malmö; Attendance: 7,423; Referees: Krstić, Ljubić (SLO)

7 April 2013; 14:00	Netherlands	27 – 23	Ukraine	Topsportcentrum Almere, Almere; Attendance: 500; Referees: Vitaku, Vitaku (Kosovo)
7 April 2013; 14:00	Sluijters 7	(13–10)	Burka 6	Topsportcentrum Almere, Almere; Attendance: 500; Referees: Vitaku, Vitaku (Kosovo)
7 April 2013; 14:00	3× (yellow card) 8× (suspension) 1× (red card)	Report	2× (yellow card) 4× (suspension)	Topsportcentrum Almere, Almere; Attendance: 500; Referees: Vitaku, Vitaku (Kosovo)

7 April 2013; 20:00	Poland	22 – 18	Sweden	Ergo Arena, Gdańsk; Attendance: 10,751; Referees: Nikolov, Nachevski (MKD)
7 April 2013; 20:00	Wiśniewski 7	(12–10)	Ekberg 4	Ergo Arena, Gdańsk; Attendance: 10,751; Referees: Nikolov, Nachevski (MKD)
7 April 2013; 20:00	3× (yellow card) 5× (suspension)	Report	3× (yellow card) 2× (suspension)	Ergo Arena, Gdańsk; Attendance: 10,751; Referees: Nikolov, Nachevski (MKD)

12 June 2013; 19:00	Ukraine	21 – 34	Sweden	Palace of Sports, Kyiv; Attendance: 1,000; Referees: Schulze, Tönnies (GER)
12 June 2013; 19:00	Vasyuk 6	(7–16)	Petersen 8	Palace of Sports, Kyiv; Attendance: 1,000; Referees: Schulze, Tönnies (GER)
12 June 2013; 19:00	2× (yellow card) 3× (suspension)	Report	3× (yellow card) 2× (suspension)	Palace of Sports, Kyiv; Attendance: 1,000; Referees: Schulze, Tönnies (GER)

12 June 2013; 19:30	Netherlands	23 – 30	Poland	Topsportcentrum Almere, Almere; Attendance: 1,750; Referees: Konjičanin, Konjičanin (BIH)
12 June 2013; 19:30	Verjans 6	(11–13)	Kuchczyński 10	Topsportcentrum Almere, Almere; Attendance: 1,750; Referees: Konjičanin, Konjičanin (BIH)
12 June 2013; 19:30	3× (yellow card) 2× (suspension)	Report	2× (yellow card) 3× (suspension)	Topsportcentrum Almere, Almere; Attendance: 1,750; Referees: Konjičanin, Konjičanin (BIH)

16 June 2013; 18:15	Sweden	34 – 23	Netherlands	Alingsås; Attendance: 2,158; Referees: Andorka, Hucker (HUN)
16 June 2013; 18:15	Petersen 8	(15–10)	Verjans 6	Alingsås; Attendance: 2,158; Referees: Andorka, Hucker (HUN)
16 June 2013; 18:15	2× (yellow card) 6× (suspension)	Report	3× (yellow card) 2× (suspension)	Alingsås; Attendance: 2,158; Referees: Andorka, Hucker (HUN)

16 June 2013; 20:00	Poland	27 – 22	Ukraine	Centrum Rekreacyjno-Sportowe, Zielona Góra; Attendance: 6,080; Referees: Stark, Stefan (ROU)
16 June 2013; 20:00	Kubisztal 6	(13–7)	Kumogorodsky 8	Centrum Rekreacyjno-Sportowe, Zielona Góra; Attendance: 6,080; Referees: Stark, Stefan (ROU)
16 June 2013; 20:00	2× (yellow card) 4× (suspension)	Report	3× (yellow card) 3× (suspension)	Centrum Rekreacyjno-Sportowe, Zielona Góra; Attendance: 6,080; Referees: Stark, Stefan (ROU)

=== Group 6 ===
Pos	Team	Pld	W	D	L	GF	GA	GD	Pts	Qualification
1	Iceland	6	5	0	1	197	176	+21	10	Final tournament
2	Belarus	6	4	1	1	189	180	+9	9	Final tournament
3	Slovenia	6	2	1	3	192	179	+13	5	
4	Romania	6	0	0	6	161	204	−43	0	

31 October 2012; 19:30	Iceland	36 – 28	Belarus	Laugardalshöll, Reykjavík; Attendance: 2,050; Referees: Hansen, Pettersen (NOR)
31 October 2012; 19:30	Pálmarsson, Sigurðsson 11	(17–13)	Rutenka 10	Laugardalshöll, Reykjavík; Attendance: 2,050; Referees: Hansen, Pettersen (NOR)
31 October 2012; 19:30	3× (yellow card) 4× (suspension)	Report	3× (yellow card) 7× (suspension) 1× (red card)	Laugardalshöll, Reykjavík; Attendance: 2,050; Referees: Hansen, Pettersen (NOR)

31 October 2012; 20:15	Slovenia	34 – 26	Romania	Bonifika Hall, Koper; Attendance: 2,500; Referees: Geipel, Helbig (GER)
31 October 2012; 20:15	Špiler, Žvižej 5	(16–13)	Ghionea 5	Bonifika Hall, Koper; Attendance: 2,500; Referees: Geipel, Helbig (GER)
31 October 2012; 20:15	3× (yellow card) 3× (suspension)	Report	3× (yellow card) 4× (suspension)	Bonifika Hall, Koper; Attendance: 2,500; Referees: Geipel, Helbig (GER)

4 November 2012; 14:00	Belarus	32 – 32	Slovenia	Minsk Sports Palace, Minsk; Attendance: 3,400; Referees: Horváth, Márton (HUN)
4 November 2012; 14:00	Rutenka 10	(16–14)	four players 5	Minsk Sports Palace, Minsk; Attendance: 3,400; Referees: Horváth, Márton (HUN)
4 November 2012; 14:00	3× (yellow card) 6× (suspension)	Report	3× (yellow card) 6× (suspension)	Minsk Sports Palace, Minsk; Attendance: 3,400; Referees: Horváth, Márton (HUN)

4 November 2012; 16:00	Romania	30 – 37	Iceland	Polyvalent Hall, Piatra Neamţ; Attendance: 2,000; Referees: Nikolov, Nachevski (MKD)
4 November 2012; 16:00	Ghionea 6	(18–19)	Sigurðsson 10	Polyvalent Hall, Piatra Neamţ; Attendance: 2,000; Referees: Nikolov, Nachevski (MKD)
4 November 2012; 16:00	3× (yellow card) 2× (suspension)	Report	3× (yellow card) 2× (suspension)	Polyvalent Hall, Piatra Neamţ; Attendance: 2,000; Referees: Nikolov, Nachevski (MKD)

3 April 2013; 18:00	Romania	31 – 34	Belarus	Polyvalent Hall, Piatra Neamț; Attendance: 1,000; Referees: Kékes, Kékes (HUN)
3 April 2013; 18:00	Dospinescu 6	(13–18)	Rutenka 11	Polyvalent Hall, Piatra Neamț; Attendance: 1,000; Referees: Kékes, Kékes (HUN)
3 April 2013; 18:00	3× (yellow card) 9× (suspension)	Report	2× (yellow card) 8× (suspension)	Polyvalent Hall, Piatra Neamț; Attendance: 1,000; Referees: Kékes, Kékes (HUN)

3 April 2013; 20:15	Slovenia	28 – 29	Iceland	Tabor Hall, Maribor; Attendance: 3,496; Referees: Caçador, Nicolau (POR)
3 April 2013; 20:15	Kavtičnik, Skube 5	(13–9)	Sigurðsson 9	Tabor Hall, Maribor; Attendance: 3,496; Referees: Caçador, Nicolau (POR)
3 April 2013; 20:15	3× (yellow card) 2× (suspension)	Report	3× (yellow card) 3× (suspension)	Tabor Hall, Maribor; Attendance: 3,496; Referees: Caçador, Nicolau (POR)

7 April 2013; 15:00	Belarus	31 – 25	Romania	Minsk Sports Palace, Minsk; Attendance: 3,400; Referees: Opava, Válek (CZE)
7 April 2013; 15:00	Rutenka 14	(17–14)	Criciotoiu 6	Minsk Sports Palace, Minsk; Attendance: 3,400; Referees: Opava, Válek (CZE)
7 April 2013; 15:00	3× (yellow card) 4× (suspension)	Report	3× (yellow card) 5× (suspension) 1× (red card)	Minsk Sports Palace, Minsk; Attendance: 3,400; Referees: Opava, Válek (CZE)

7 April 2013; 16:00	Iceland	35 – 34	Slovenia	Laugardalshöll, Reykjavík; Attendance: 2,500; Referees: Baďura, Ondogrecula (SVK)
7 April 2013; 16:00	Sigurðsson 13	(15–18)	Bilbija, Marguč 9	Laugardalshöll, Reykjavík; Attendance: 2,500; Referees: Baďura, Ondogrecula (SVK)
7 April 2013; 16:00	2× (yellow card) 5× (suspension)	Report	3× (yellow card) 3× (suspension)	Laugardalshöll, Reykjavík; Attendance: 2,500; Referees: Baďura, Ondogrecula (SVK)

12 June 2013; 18:00	Belarus	29 – 23	Iceland	Minsk Sports Palace, Minsk; Attendance: 3,400; Referees: Nikolić, Stojković (SRB)
12 June 2013; 18:00	Pukhouski 9	(16–10)	Sigurðsson 7	Minsk Sports Palace, Minsk; Attendance: 3,400; Referees: Nikolić, Stojković (SRB)
12 June 2013; 18:00	3× (yellow card) 3× (suspension)	Report	3× (yellow card) 3× (suspension)	Minsk Sports Palace, Minsk; Attendance: 3,400; Referees: Nikolić, Stojković (SRB)

12 June 2013; 18:00	Romania	22 – 31	Slovenia	Polyvalent Hall, Bucharest; Attendance: 500; Referees: Pandzić, Mosorinski (SRB)
12 June 2013; 18:00	Grasu 6	(11–14)	Špiler 9	Polyvalent Hall, Bucharest; Attendance: 500; Referees: Pandzić, Mosorinski (SRB)
12 June 2013; 18:00	3× (yellow card) 3× (suspension)	Report	3× (yellow card) 4× (suspension)	Polyvalent Hall, Bucharest; Attendance: 500; Referees: Pandzić, Mosorinski (SRB)

16 June 2013; 18:00	Slovenia	33 – 35	Belarus	Arena Stožice, Ljubljana; Attendance: 5,500; Referees: Lorente, Serradilla (ESP)
16 June 2013; 18:00	Bilbija 7	(17–18)	Pukhouski 10	Arena Stožice, Ljubljana; Attendance: 5,500; Referees: Lorente, Serradilla (ESP)
16 June 2013; 18:00	3× (yellow card) 3× (suspension)	Report	3× (yellow card) 4× (suspension)	Arena Stožice, Ljubljana; Attendance: 5,500; Referees: Lorente, Serradilla (ESP)

16 June 2013; 19:45	Iceland	37 – 27	Romania	Laugardalshöll, Reykjavík; Attendance: 2,800; Referees: Bonifert, Oláh (HUN)
16 June 2013; 19:45	Sigurðsson 12	(14–15)	three players 5	Laugardalshöll, Reykjavík; Attendance: 2,800; Referees: Bonifert, Oláh (HUN)
16 June 2013; 19:45	1× (yellow card) 4× (suspension)	Report	2× (yellow card) 6× (suspension)	Laugardalshöll, Reykjavík; Attendance: 2,800; Referees: Bonifert, Oláh (HUN)

=== Group 7 ===
Pos	Team	Pld	W	D	L	GF	GA	GD	Pts	Qualification
1	Serbia	6	4	1	1	171	162	+9	9	Final tournament
2	Austria	6	3	2	1	185	173	+12	8	Final tournament
3	Russia	6	3	0	3	178	167	+11	6	Final tournament
4	Bosnia and Herzegovina	6	0	1	5	143	175	−32	1	

31 October 2012; 20:25	Austria	35 – 24	Bosnia and Herzegovina	Stadt- und Sporthalle, Linz; Attendance: 3,200; Referees: Kékes, Kékes (HUN)
31 October 2012; 20:25	Schlinger 7	(18–7)	Terzić, Vražalić 5	Stadt- und Sporthalle, Linz; Attendance: 3,200; Referees: Kékes, Kékes (HUN)
31 October 2012; 20:25	3× (yellow card) 7× (suspension)	Report	3× (yellow card) 4× (suspension)	Stadt- und Sporthalle, Linz; Attendance: 3,200; Referees: Kékes, Kékes (HUN)

31 October 2012; 20:30	Serbia	30 – 29	Russia	Čair Sports Center, Niš; Attendance: 5,000; Referees: Dinu, Din (ROU)
31 October 2012; 20:30	Šešum 8	(15–12)	Dibirov 9	Čair Sports Center, Niš; Attendance: 5,000; Referees: Dinu, Din (ROU)
31 October 2012; 20:30	3× (yellow card) 4× (suspension)	Report	3× (yellow card) 6× (suspension)	Čair Sports Center, Niš; Attendance: 5,000; Referees: Dinu, Din (ROU)

4 November 2012; 17:00	Bosnia and Herzegovina	21 – 24	Serbia	Dvorana Mirza Delibašić, Sarajevo; Attendance: 2,000; Referees: Gjeding, Hansen (DEN)
4 November 2012; 17:00	Toromanović 6	(12–8)	Vujin 8	Dvorana Mirza Delibašić, Sarajevo; Attendance: 2,000; Referees: Gjeding, Hansen (DEN)
4 November 2012; 17:00	2× (yellow card) 3× (suspension)	Report	3× (yellow card) 4× (suspension)	Dvorana Mirza Delibašić, Sarajevo; Attendance: 2,000; Referees: Gjeding, Hansen (DEN)

4 November 2012; 17:00	Russia	38 – 31	Austria	SC V.P. Suchareva, Perm; Attendance: 2,500; Referees: Brunovský, Čanda (SVK)
4 November 2012; 17:00	Dibirov 8	(19–12)	Szilágyi 9	SC V.P. Suchareva, Perm; Attendance: 2,500; Referees: Brunovský, Čanda (SVK)
4 November 2012; 17:00	3× (yellow card) 4× (suspension)	Report	3× (yellow card) 3× (suspension)	SC V.P. Suchareva, Perm; Attendance: 2,500; Referees: Brunovský, Čanda (SVK)

3 April 2013; 20:25	Austria	31 – 28	Serbia	Stadthalle Graz, Graz; Attendance: 3,700; Referees: Olesen, Pedersen (DEN)
3 April 2013; 20:25	Szilágyi, Weber 8	(16–17)	Ilić 12	Stadthalle Graz, Graz; Attendance: 3,700; Referees: Olesen, Pedersen (DEN)
3 April 2013; 20:25	3× (yellow card) 6× (suspension) 1× (red card)	Report	3× (yellow card) 5× (suspension) 1× (red card)	Stadthalle Graz, Graz; Attendance: 3,700; Referees: Olesen, Pedersen (DEN)

4 April 2013; 17:00	Bosnia and Herzegovina	23 – 32	Russia	KSC Mladost, Visoko; Attendance: 2,680; Referees: Bounouara, Sami (FRA)
4 April 2013; 17:00	Milas, Savić, Vražalić 4	(13–17)	Dibirov 9	KSC Mladost, Visoko; Attendance: 2,680; Referees: Bounouara, Sami (FRA)
4 April 2013; 17:00	2× (yellow card) 2× (suspension)	Report	3× (yellow card) 1× (suspension) 1× (red card)	KSC Mladost, Visoko; Attendance: 2,680; Referees: Bounouara, Sami (FRA)

7 April 2013; 16:00	Russia	26 – 24	Bosnia and Herzegovina	Olymp Sports Palace, Krasnodar; Attendance: 2,000; Referees: Erdoğan, Özdeniz (TUR)
7 April 2013; 16:00	Igropulo 5	(10–11)	Čelica, Savić 4	Olymp Sports Palace, Krasnodar; Attendance: 2,000; Referees: Erdoğan, Özdeniz (TUR)
7 April 2013; 16:00	3× (yellow card) 3× (suspension)	Report	3× (yellow card) 5× (suspension)	Olymp Sports Palace, Krasnodar; Attendance: 2,000; Referees: Erdoğan, Özdeniz (TUR)

7 April 2013; 18:30	Serbia	30 – 30	Austria	Kristalna Dvorana, Zrenjanin; Attendance: 3,000; Referees: Lorente, Serradilla (ESP)
7 April 2013; 18:30	Nikčević 8	(16–14)	three players 5	Kristalna Dvorana, Zrenjanin; Attendance: 3,000; Referees: Lorente, Serradilla (ESP)
7 April 2013; 18:30	3× (yellow card) 2× (suspension)	Report	3× (yellow card) 7× (suspension) 1× (red card)	Kristalna Dvorana, Zrenjanin; Attendance: 3,000; Referees: Lorente, Serradilla (ESP)

12 June 2013; 18:00	Russia	28 – 29	Serbia	Sportcomplex Zvezdniy, Astrakhan; Attendance: 5,000; Referees: Leifsson, Pálsson (ISL)
12 June 2013; 18:00	Igropulo 9	(11–17)	Nenadić 6	Sportcomplex Zvezdniy, Astrakhan; Attendance: 5,000; Referees: Leifsson, Pálsson (ISL)
12 June 2013; 18:00	2× (yellow card) 5× (suspension)	Report	3× (yellow card) 5× (suspension)	Sportcomplex Zvezdniy, Astrakhan; Attendance: 5,000; Referees: Leifsson, Pálsson (ISL)

13 June 2013; 17:00	Bosnia and Herzegovina	28 – 28	Austria	KSC Mladost, Visoko; Attendance: 1,500; Referees: Opava, Válek (CZE)
13 June 2013; 17:00	Čelica, Karačić 5	(15–13)	Szilagyi 7	KSC Mladost, Visoko; Attendance: 1,500; Referees: Opava, Válek (CZE)
13 June 2013; 17:00	3× (yellow card) 3× (suspension)	Report	2× (yellow card) 6× (suspension)	KSC Mladost, Visoko; Attendance: 1,500; Referees: Opava, Válek (CZE)

16 June 2013; 19:00	Serbia	30 – 23	Bosnia and Herzegovina	Čair Sports Center, Niš; Attendance: 5,600; Referees: Nikolov, Nachevski (MKD)
16 June 2013; 19:00	Marjanović 7	(13–12)	Vražalić 5	Čair Sports Center, Niš; Attendance: 5,600; Referees: Nikolov, Nachevski (MKD)
16 June 2013; 19:00	3× (yellow card) 3× (suspension)	Report	3× (yellow card) 2× (suspension)	Čair Sports Center, Niš; Attendance: 5,600; Referees: Nikolov, Nachevski (MKD)

16 June 2013; 19:15	Austria	30 – 25	Russia	Innsbruck; Attendance: 3,500; Referees: Gubica, Milošević (CRO)
16 June 2013; 19:15	three players 6	(12–12)	Dibirov 6	Innsbruck; Attendance: 3,500; Referees: Gubica, Milošević (CRO)
16 June 2013; 19:15	3× (yellow card) 4× (suspension)	Report	3× (yellow card) 2× (suspension)	Innsbruck; Attendance: 3,500; Referees: Gubica, Milošević (CRO)
