= 2014 European Men's Handball Championship =

2014 edition of the European Men's Handball Championship

2014 EHF European Men's Handball Championship
EM i håndbold for mænd 2014

Tournament details
- Host country: Denmark
- Venues: 4 (in 4 host cities)
- Dates: 12–26 January
- Teams: 16 (from 1 confederation)

Final positions
- Champions: France (3rd title)
- Runners-up: Denmark
- Third place: Spain
- Fourth place: Croatia

Tournament statistics
- Matches played: 47
- Goals scored: 2,612 (55.57 per match)
- Attendance: 316,390 (6,732 per match)
- Top scorer: Joan Cañellas (ESP) (50 goals)

Awards
- Best player: Nikola Karabatić (FRA)

The 2014 EHF European Men's Handball Championship was the 11th edition of the tournament and held in Denmark from 12–26 January.

Denmark was automatically qualified as hosting nation, and as defending champions as well. After the final, at total of 316,390 spectators had visited the stadiums. An all time EHF record.

France won the title after defeating defending champions and hosts Denmark in the final. Spain captured the bronze medal, after defeating Croatia.

== Bidding process ==
The bids were as follows:

- Denmark
- Croatia and Hungary

Denmark was awarded the championship on the EHF Congress in Copenhagen 25 September 2010, narrowly defeating their rivals by two votes.

Voting results
Country
Country	Votes
Denmark	24
Croatia and Hungary	22
Total	46

== Venues ==
Aalborg	Aarhus	2014 European Men's Handball Championship is located in Denmark
Gigantium; Capacity: 6,500	NRGi Arena; Capacity: 5,001	2014 European Men's Handball Championship is located in Denmark
Brøndby	Herning	2014 European Men's Handball Championship is located in Denmark
Brøndby Hall; Capacity: 4,950	Jyske Bank Boxen; Capacity: 15,000	2014 European Men's Handball Championship is located in Denmark

== Referees ==
On 23 October 2013, 12 couples were announced in Vienna.

Country	Referees
Belarus	Andrei Gousko; Siarhei Repkin
Croatia	Matija Gubica; Boris Milošević
Czech Republic	Václav Horáček; Jiří Novotný
Denmark	Martin Gjeding; Mads Hansen
France	Thierry Dentz; Denis Reibel
Germany	Lars Geipel; Marcus Helbig

Country	Referees
Latvia	Zigmārs Stoļarovs; Renārs Līcis
Macedonia	Gjorgi Nachevski; Slave Nikolov
Romania	Bogdan Stark; Romeo Ştefan
Serbia	Nenad Nikolić; Dušan Stojković
Slovenia	Nenad Krstić; Peter Ljubič
Spain	Óscar Raluy; Ángel Sabroso

== Qualification ==
Qualified teams

=== Qualified teams ===
Country	Qualified as	Qualified on	Previous appearances in tournament^{1}
Denmark	Host (and Defending Champion)	25 September 2010	9 (1994, 1996, 2000, 2002, 2004, 2006, **2008**, 2010, **2012**)
France	Group 3 winner	6 April 2013	10 (1994, 1996, 1998, 2000, 2002, 2004, **2006**, 2008, **2010**, 2012)
Spain	Group 1 winner	7 April 2013	10 (1994, 1996, 1998, 2000, 2002, 2004, 2006, 2008, 2010, 2012)
Iceland	Group 6 winner	7 April 2013	7 (2000, 2002, 2004, 2006, 2008, 2010, 2012)
Sweden	Group 5 winner	12 June 2013	9 (**1994**, 1996, **1998**, **2000**, **2002**, 2004, 2008, 2010, 2012)
Hungary	Group 4 runner-up	12 June 2013	8 (1994, 1996, 1998, 2004, 2006, 2008, 2010, 2012)
Norway	Group 3 runner-up	12 June 2013	5 (2000, 2006, 2008, 2010, 2012)
Poland	Group 5 runner-up	12 June 2013	6 (2002, 2004, 2006, 2008, 2010, 2012)
Montenegro	Group 2 runner-up	12 June 2013	1 (2008)
Croatia	Group 4 winner	12 June 2013	10 (1994, 1996, 1998, 2000, 2002, 2004, 2006, 2008, 2010, 2012)
Serbia	Group 7 winner	12 June 2013	2 (2010, 2012)
Czech Republic	Group 2 winner	15 June 2013	7 (1996, 1998, 2002, 2004, 2008, 2010, 2012)
Belarus	Group 6 runner-up	16 June 2013	2 (1994, 2008)
Austria	Group 7 runner-up	16 June 2013	1 (2010)
Russia	best third placed team	16 June 2013	10 (1994, **1996**, 1998, 2000, 2002, 2004, 2006, 2008, 2010, 2012)
Macedonia	Group 1 runner-up	16 June 2013	2 (1998, 2012)

^{1} Bold indicates champion for that year. Italics indicates host.

== Seeding ==
The draw was held on 21 June 2013 in Herning at 18:00 local time. The seeding was announced on 18 June 2013.

Pot 1	Pot 2	Pot 3	Pot 4
Denmark (assigned to A1); Serbia; Croatia; Spain	Czech Republic; Iceland; France (assigned to C2); Sweden (assigned to D2)	Macedonia; Belarus; Hungary; Poland	Norway (assigned to B4); Austria; Montenegro; Russia

== Group stage ==
All times are local (UTC+1).

Team advance to the Main Round

=== Group A ===
Venue: Jyske Bank Boxen, Herning

Team	Pld	W	D	L	GF	GA	GD	Pts
Denmark	3	3	0	0	95	79	+16	6
Macedonia	3	1	1	1	67	74	−7	3
Austria	3	1	0	2	80	75	+5	2
Czech Republic	3	0	1	2	73	87	−14	1

12 January 2014; 18:00	Czech Republic	20 – 30	Austria	Jyske Bank Boxen, Herning; Attendance: 13,000; Referees: Nikolić, Stojković (SRB)
12 January 2014; 18:00	Jícha 6	(9–14)	Weber 7	Jyske Bank Boxen, Herning; Attendance: 13,000; Referees: Nikolić, Stojković (SRB)
12 January 2014; 18:00	3× (yellow card) 2× (suspension)	Report	2× (yellow card) 6× (suspension)	Jyske Bank Boxen, Herning; Attendance: 13,000; Referees: Nikolić, Stojković (SRB)

12 January 2014; 20:30	Denmark	29 – 21	Macedonia	Jyske Bank Boxen, Herning; Attendance: 14,000; Referees: Geipel, Helbig (GER)
12 January 2014; 20:30	Mortensen 5	(12–8)	Lazarov 7	Jyske Bank Boxen, Herning; Attendance: 14,000; Referees: Geipel, Helbig (GER)
12 January 2014; 20:30	3× (yellow card) 7× (suspension)	Report	3× (yellow card) 3× (suspension)	Jyske Bank Boxen, Herning; Attendance: 14,000; Referees: Geipel, Helbig (GER)

14 January 2014; 18:15	Macedonia	24 – 24	Czech Republic	Jyske Bank Boxen, Herning; Attendance: 10,100; Referees: Stark, Ştefan (ROU)
14 January 2014; 18:15	Lazarov 12	(10–11)	Horák 8	Jyske Bank Boxen, Herning; Attendance: 10,100; Referees: Stark, Ştefan (ROU)
14 January 2014; 18:15	3× (yellow card) 3× (suspension)	Report	3× (yellow card) 4× (suspension)	Jyske Bank Boxen, Herning; Attendance: 10,100; Referees: Stark, Ştefan (ROU)

14 January 2014; 20:30	Austria	29 – 33	Denmark	Jyske Bank Boxen, Herning; Attendance: 14,000; Referees: Gousko, Repkin (BLR)
14 January 2014; 20:30	Hermann 5	(12–18)	Hansen 9	Jyske Bank Boxen, Herning; Attendance: 14,000; Referees: Gousko, Repkin (BLR)
14 January 2014; 20:30	3× (yellow card) 3× (suspension)	Report	3× (yellow card) 4× (suspension)	Jyske Bank Boxen, Herning; Attendance: 14,000; Referees: Gousko, Repkin (BLR)

16 January 2014; 18:15	Macedonia	22 – 21	Austria	Jyske Bank Boxen, Herning; Attendance: 12,000; Referees: Dentz, Reibel (FRA)
16 January 2014; 18:15	Lazarov 8	(12–10)	Wilczynski 7	Jyske Bank Boxen, Herning; Attendance: 12,000; Referees: Dentz, Reibel (FRA)
16 January 2014; 18:15	3× (yellow card) 5× (suspension)	Report	4× (yellow card) 6× (suspension)	Jyske Bank Boxen, Herning; Attendance: 12,000; Referees: Dentz, Reibel (FRA)

16 January 2014; 20:30	Denmark	33 – 29	Czech Republic	Jyske Bank Boxen, Herning; Attendance: 14,000; Referees: Gubica, Milošević (CRO)
16 January 2014; 20:30	Lindberg 6	(21–17)	Jícha 11	Jyske Bank Boxen, Herning; Attendance: 14,000; Referees: Gubica, Milošević (CRO)
16 January 2014; 20:30	3× (yellow card) 2× (suspension)	Report	3× (yellow card) 4× (suspension)	Jyske Bank Boxen, Herning; Attendance: 14,000; Referees: Gubica, Milošević (CRO)

=== Group B ===
Venue: Gigantium, Aalborg

Team	Pld	W	D	L	GF	GA	GD	Pts
Spain	3	3	0	0	94	80	+14	6
Iceland	3	1	1	1	86	86	0	3
Hungary	3	0	2	1	80	87	−7	2
Norway	3	0	1	2	77	84	−7	1

12 January 2014; 16:00	Iceland	31 – 26	Norway	Gigantium, Aalborg; Attendance: 4,000; Referees: Gubica, Milošević (CRO)
12 January 2014; 16:00	Sigurðsson 9	(16–10)	Kjelling 7	Gigantium, Aalborg; Attendance: 4,000; Referees: Gubica, Milošević (CRO)
12 January 2014; 16:00	3× (yellow card) 5× (suspension) 1× (red card)	Report	2× (yellow card) 5× (suspension)	Gigantium, Aalborg; Attendance: 4,000; Referees: Gubica, Milošević (CRO)

12 January 2014; 18:15	Spain	34 – 27	Hungary	Gigantium, Aalborg; Attendance: 4,000; Referees: Krstić, Ljubič (SLO)
12 January 2014; 18:15	Rocas, Tomás 5	(17–10)	Iváncsik 8	Gigantium, Aalborg; Attendance: 4,000; Referees: Krstić, Ljubič (SLO)
12 January 2014; 18:15	3× (yellow card) 3× (suspension)	Report	3× (yellow card) 7× (suspension)	Gigantium, Aalborg; Attendance: 4,000; Referees: Krstić, Ljubič (SLO)

14 January 2014; 18:00	Hungary	27 – 27	Iceland	Gigantium, Aalborg; Attendance: 3,200; Referees: Nikolić, Stojković (SRB)
14 January 2014; 18:00	Ancsin 7	(16–15)	Pálmarsson 8	Gigantium, Aalborg; Attendance: 3,200; Referees: Nikolić, Stojković (SRB)
14 January 2014; 18:00	4× (yellow card) 8× (suspension) 1× (red card)	Report	3× (yellow card) 4× (suspension)	Gigantium, Aalborg; Attendance: 3,200; Referees: Nikolić, Stojković (SRB)

14 January 2014; 20:15	Norway	25 – 27	Spain	Gigantium, Aalborg; Attendance: 3,200; Referees: Dentz, Reibel (FRA)
14 January 2014; 20:15	Myrhol 7	(8–12)	Tomás 8	Gigantium, Aalborg; Attendance: 3,200; Referees: Dentz, Reibel (FRA)
14 January 2014; 20:15	4× (yellow card) 6× (suspension)	Report	3× (yellow card) 5× (suspension)	Gigantium, Aalborg; Attendance: 3,200; Referees: Dentz, Reibel (FRA)

16 January 2014; 18:00	Spain	33 – 28	Iceland	Gigantium, Aalborg; Attendance: 2,923; Referees: Gousko, Repkin (BLR)
16 January 2014; 18:00	Cañellas 8	(16–15)	Pálmarsson 8	Gigantium, Aalborg; Attendance: 2,923; Referees: Gousko, Repkin (BLR)
16 January 2014; 18:00	3× (yellow card) 1× (suspension)	Report	4× (yellow card) 4× (suspension)	Gigantium, Aalborg; Attendance: 2,923; Referees: Gousko, Repkin (BLR)

16 January 2014; 20:15	Hungary	26 – 26	Norway	Gigantium, Aalborg; Attendance: 2,923; Referees: Stoļarovs, Līcis (LAT)
16 January 2014; 20:15	Lékai 7	(16–13)	Tvedten 7	Gigantium, Aalborg; Attendance: 2,923; Referees: Stoļarovs, Līcis (LAT)
16 January 2014; 20:15	3× (yellow card) 4× (suspension)	Report	3× (yellow card) 1× (suspension)	Gigantium, Aalborg; Attendance: 2,923; Referees: Stoļarovs, Līcis (LAT)

=== Group C ===
Venue: NRGi Arena, Aarhus

Team	Pld	W	D	L	GF	GA	GD	Pts
France	3	3	0	0	94	83	+11	6
Poland	3	1	0	2	70	70	0	2
Russia	3	1	0	2	77	84	−7	2
Serbia	3	1	0	2	73	77	−4	2

13 January 2014; 18:00	Serbia	20 – 19	Poland	NRGi Arena, Aarhus; Attendance: 2,000; Referees: Gjeding, Hansen (DEN)
13 January 2014; 18:00	three players 3	(13–9)	Jurkiewicz 5	NRGi Arena, Aarhus; Attendance: 2,000; Referees: Gjeding, Hansen (DEN)
13 January 2014; 18:00	3× (yellow card) 8× (suspension)	Report	4× (yellow card) 3× (suspension)	NRGi Arena, Aarhus; Attendance: 2,000; Referees: Gjeding, Hansen (DEN)

13 January 2014; 20:15	France	35 – 28	Russia	NRGi Arena, Aarhus; Attendance: 2,350; Referees: Horáček, Novotný (CZE)
13 January 2014; 20:15	Nyokas 9	(19–14)	Kovalev 6	NRGi Arena, Aarhus; Attendance: 2,350; Referees: Horáček, Novotný (CZE)
13 January 2014; 20:15	3× (yellow card) 3× (suspension)	Report	3× (yellow card) 4× (suspension)	NRGi Arena, Aarhus; Attendance: 2,350; Referees: Horáček, Novotný (CZE)

15 January 2014; 18:00	Russia	27 – 25	Serbia	NRGi Arena, Aarhus; Attendance: 3,200; Referees: Raluy, Sabroso (ESP)
15 January 2014; 18:00	Evdokimov 5	(14–14)	Vujin 6	NRGi Arena, Aarhus; Attendance: 3,200; Referees: Raluy, Sabroso (ESP)
15 January 2014; 18:00	3× (yellow card) 5× (suspension)	Report	3× (yellow card) 6× (suspension)	NRGi Arena, Aarhus; Attendance: 3,200; Referees: Raluy, Sabroso (ESP)

15 January 2014; 20:15	Poland	27 – 28	France	NRGi Arena, Aarhus; Attendance: 2,785; Referees: Krstić, Ljubič (SLO)
15 January 2014; 20:15	Łucak 5	(14–15)	Karabatić 8	NRGi Arena, Aarhus; Attendance: 2,785; Referees: Krstić, Ljubič (SLO)
15 January 2014; 20:15	4× (yellow card) 6× (suspension)	Report	3× (yellow card) 6× (suspension)	NRGi Arena, Aarhus; Attendance: 2,785; Referees: Krstić, Ljubič (SLO)

17 January 2014; 18:00	Poland	24 – 22	Russia	NRGi Arena, Aarhus; Attendance: 4,860; Referees: Nachevski, Nikolov (MKD)
17 January 2014; 18:00	Lijewski, Łucak 4	(10–14)	Atman 6	NRGi Arena, Aarhus; Attendance: 4,860; Referees: Nachevski, Nikolov (MKD)
17 January 2014; 18:00	2× (yellow card) 4× (suspension)	Report	2× (yellow card) 4× (suspension)	NRGi Arena, Aarhus; Attendance: 4,860; Referees: Nachevski, Nikolov (MKD)

17 January 2014; 20:15	Serbia	28 – 31	France	NRGi Arena, Aarhus; Attendance: 4,562; Referees: Geipel, Helbig (GER)
17 January 2014; 20:15	three players 5	(12–17)	Joli 10	NRGi Arena, Aarhus; Attendance: 4,562; Referees: Geipel, Helbig (GER)
17 January 2014; 20:15	3× (yellow card) 3× (suspension)	Report	2× (yellow card) 3× (suspension)	NRGi Arena, Aarhus; Attendance: 4,562; Referees: Geipel, Helbig (GER)

=== Group D ===
Venue: Brøndby Hall, Brøndby

Team	Pld	W	D	L	GF	GA	GD	Pts
Croatia	3	3	0	0	85	68	+17	6
Sweden	3	2	0	1	82	68	+14	4
Belarus	3	1	0	2	73	86	−13	2
Montenegro	3	0	0	3	66	84	−18	0

13 January 2014; 18:00	Croatia	33 – 22	Belarus	Brøndby Hall, Brøndby; Attendance: 2,400; Referees: Stark, Ştefan (ROU)
13 January 2014; 18:00	Čupić, Horvat 6	(16–11)	Pukhouski 6	Brøndby Hall, Brøndby; Attendance: 2,400; Referees: Stark, Ştefan (ROU)
13 January 2014; 18:00	3× (yellow card) 6× (suspension)	Report	2× (yellow card) 5× (suspension)	Brøndby Hall, Brøndby; Attendance: 2,400; Referees: Stark, Ştefan (ROU)

13 January 2014; 20:15	Sweden	28 – 21	Montenegro	Brøndby Hall, Brøndby; Attendance: 2,697; Referees: Stoļarovs, Līcis (LAT)
13 January 2014; 20:15	Ekdahl du Rietz 7	(18–13)	Ševaljević 5	Brøndby Hall, Brøndby; Attendance: 2,697; Referees: Stoļarovs, Līcis (LAT)
13 January 2014; 20:15	3× (yellow card) 5× (suspension)	Report	3× (yellow card) 4× (suspension)	Brøndby Hall, Brøndby; Attendance: 2,697; Referees: Stoļarovs, Līcis (LAT)

15 January 2014; 18:00	Montenegro	22 – 27	Croatia	Brøndby Hall, Brøndby; Attendance: 2,655; Referees: Horáček, Novotný (CZE)
15 January 2014; 18:00	Ševaljević 9	(12–13)	Čupić 6	Brøndby Hall, Brøndby; Attendance: 2,655; Referees: Horáček, Novotný (CZE)
15 January 2014; 18:00	3× (yellow card) 2× (suspension)	Report	3× (yellow card) 4× (suspension)	Brøndby Hall, Brøndby; Attendance: 2,655; Referees: Horáček, Novotný (CZE)

15 January 2014; 20:15	Belarus	22 – 30	Sweden	Brøndby Hall, Brøndby; Attendance: 3,100; Referees: Nachevski, Nikolov (MKD)
15 January 2014; 20:15	Rutenka 13	(10–13)	Petersen 8	Brøndby Hall, Brøndby; Attendance: 3,100; Referees: Nachevski, Nikolov (MKD)
15 January 2014; 20:15	3× (yellow card) 4× (suspension)	Report	3× (yellow card) 4× (suspension)	Brøndby Hall, Brøndby; Attendance: 3,100; Referees: Nachevski, Nikolov (MKD)

17 January 2014; 18:00	Croatia	25 – 24	Sweden	Brøndby Hall, Brøndby; Attendance: 4,785; Referees: Raluy, Sabroso (ESP)
17 January 2014; 18:00	Buntić, Duvnjak 6	(10–9)	Karlsson 5	Brøndby Hall, Brøndby; Attendance: 4,785; Referees: Raluy, Sabroso (ESP)
17 January 2014; 18:00	4× (yellow card) 4× (suspension)	Report	4× (yellow card) 4× (suspension) 1× (red card)	Brøndby Hall, Brøndby; Attendance: 4,785; Referees: Raluy, Sabroso (ESP)

17 January 2014; 20:15	Belarus	29 – 23	Montenegro	Brøndby Hall, Brøndby; Attendance: 3,400; Referees: Gjeding, Hansen (DEN)
17 January 2014; 20:15	Rutenka 8	(13–13)	Simović 8	Brøndby Hall, Brøndby; Attendance: 3,400; Referees: Gjeding, Hansen (DEN)
17 January 2014; 20:15	2× (yellow card) 6× (suspension)	Report	3× (yellow card) 4× (suspension)	Brøndby Hall, Brøndby; Attendance: 3,400; Referees: Gjeding, Hansen (DEN)

== Main round ==
Team advance to the semifinals
Team advances to the placement game

=== Group I ===
Venue: Jyske Bank Boxen, Herning

Team	Pld	W	D	L	GF	GA	GD	Pts
Denmark	5	5	0	0	153	125	+28	10
Spain	5	4	0	1	156	135	+21	8
Iceland	5	2	1	2	140	146	−6	5
Hungary	5	1	1	3	133	139	−6	3
Macedonia	5	1	0	4	117	143	−26	2
Austria	5	1	0	4	129	140	−11	2

18 January 2014; 16:00	Macedonia	25 – 31	Hungary	Jyske Bank Boxen, Herning; Attendance: 8,100; Referees: Gousko, Repkin (BLR)
18 January 2014; 16:00	Manaskov, Pecakovski 5	(9–16)	Császár 7	Jyske Bank Boxen, Herning; Attendance: 8,100; Referees: Gousko, Repkin (BLR)
18 January 2014; 16:00	3× (yellow card) 5× (suspension)	Report	3× (yellow card) 5× (suspension)	Jyske Bank Boxen, Herning; Attendance: 8,100; Referees: Gousko, Repkin (BLR)

18 January 2014; 18:15	Austria	27 – 33	Iceland	Jyske Bank Boxen, Herning; Attendance: 10,000; Referees: Stark, Ştefan (ROU)
18 January 2014; 18:15	Wilczynski 6	(9–17)	Sigurðsson 7	Jyske Bank Boxen, Herning; Attendance: 10,000; Referees: Stark, Ştefan (ROU)
18 January 2014; 18:15	3× (yellow card) 4× (suspension)	Report	3× (yellow card) 3× (suspension)	Jyske Bank Boxen, Herning; Attendance: 10,000; Referees: Stark, Ştefan (ROU)

18 January 2014; 20:30	Denmark	31 – 28	Spain	Jyske Bank Boxen, Herning; Attendance: 14,000; Referees: Nikolić, Stojković (SRB)
18 January 2014; 20:30	Hansen 6	(16–14)	García 5	Jyske Bank Boxen, Herning; Attendance: 14,000; Referees: Nikolić, Stojković (SRB)
18 January 2014; 20:30	4× (yellow card) 4× (suspension)	Report	3× (yellow card) 2× (suspension)	Jyske Bank Boxen, Herning; Attendance: 14,000; Referees: Nikolić, Stojković (SRB)

20 January 2014; 16:00	Macedonia	27 – 29	Iceland	Jyske Bank Boxen, Herning; Attendance: 5,000; Referees: Horáček, Novotný (CZE)
20 January 2014; 16:00	Lazarov 7	(11–14)	Sigurðsson, Hallgrímsson 6	Jyske Bank Boxen, Herning; Attendance: 5,000; Referees: Horáček, Novotný (CZE)
20 January 2014; 16:00	3× (yellow card) 5× (suspension)	Report	4× (yellow card) 4× (suspension)	Jyske Bank Boxen, Herning; Attendance: 5,000; Referees: Horáček, Novotný (CZE)

20 January 2014; 18:15	Austria	27 – 28	Spain	Jyske Bank Boxen, Herning; Attendance: 11,000; Referees: Gousko, Repkin (BLR)
20 January 2014; 18:15	Schmid 6	(12–14)	Aguinagalde 8	Jyske Bank Boxen, Herning; Attendance: 11,000; Referees: Gousko, Repkin (BLR)
20 January 2014; 18:15	4× (yellow card) 4× (suspension)	Report	2× (yellow card) 3× (suspension)	Jyske Bank Boxen, Herning; Attendance: 11,000; Referees: Gousko, Repkin (BLR)

20 January 2014; 20:30	Denmark	28 – 24	Hungary	Jyske Bank Boxen, Herning; Attendance: 14,000; Referees: Krstić, Ljubič (SLO)
20 January 2014; 20:30	Mogensen, Hansen 5	(14–11)	Iváncsik 6	Jyske Bank Boxen, Herning; Attendance: 14,000; Referees: Krstić, Ljubič (SLO)
20 January 2014; 20:30	3× (yellow card) 3× (suspension)	Report	4× (yellow card) 2× (suspension) 1× (red card)	Jyske Bank Boxen, Herning; Attendance: 14,000; Referees: Krstić, Ljubič (SLO)

22 January 2014; 16:00	Macedonia	22 – 33	Spain	Jyske Bank Boxen, Herning; Attendance: 4,500; Referees: Stoļarovs, Līcis (LAT)
22 January 2014; 16:00	Mirkulovski 7	(12–15)	Cañellas 6	Jyske Bank Boxen, Herning; Attendance: 4,500; Referees: Stoļarovs, Līcis (LAT)
22 January 2014; 16:00	3× (yellow card) 5× (suspension)	Report	2× (yellow card)	Jyske Bank Boxen, Herning; Attendance: 4,500; Referees: Stoļarovs, Līcis (LAT)

22 January 2014; 18:15	Austria	25 – 24	Hungary	Jyske Bank Boxen, Herning; Attendance: 11,000; Referees: Gubica, Milošević (CRO)
22 January 2014; 18:15	Szilágyi, Santos 6	(9–13)	Iváncsik 5	Jyske Bank Boxen, Herning; Attendance: 11,000; Referees: Gubica, Milošević (CRO)
22 January 2014; 18:15	3× (yellow card) 6× (suspension)	Report	3× (yellow card) 4× (suspension)	Jyske Bank Boxen, Herning; Attendance: 11,000; Referees: Gubica, Milošević (CRO)

22 January 2014; 20:30	Denmark	32 – 23	Iceland	Jyske Bank Boxen, Herning; Attendance: 14,000; Referees: Dentz, Reibel (FRA)
22 January 2014; 20:30	Mensah 8	(17–13)	Sigurðsson 10	Jyske Bank Boxen, Herning; Attendance: 14,000; Referees: Dentz, Reibel (FRA)
22 January 2014; 20:30	4× (yellow card) 1× (suspension)	Report	4× (yellow card) 2× (suspension)	Jyske Bank Boxen, Herning; Attendance: 14,000; Referees: Dentz, Reibel (FRA)

=== Group II ===
Venue: NRGi Arena, Aarhus

Team	Pld	W	D	L	GF	GA	GD	Pts
France	5	4	0	1	157	140	+17	8
Croatia	5	4	0	1	147	126	+21	8
Poland	5	3	0	2	145	136	+9	6
Sweden	5	3	0	2	138	137	+1	6
Russia	5	1	0	4	141	154	−13	2
Belarus	5	0	0	5	137	172	−35	0

19 January 2014; 15:45	Poland	31 – 30	Belarus	NRGi Arena, Aarhus; Attendance: 2,680; Referees: Krstić, Ljubič (SLO)
19 January 2014; 15:45	Jurkiewicz 8	(26–13)	Rutenka 9	NRGi Arena, Aarhus; Attendance: 2,680; Referees: Krstić, Ljubič (SLO)
19 January 2014; 15:45	4× (yellow card) 5× (suspension)	Report	3× (yellow card) 7× (suspension)	NRGi Arena, Aarhus; Attendance: 2,680; Referees: Krstić, Ljubič (SLO)

19 January 2014; 18:00	Russia	27 – 29	Sweden	NRGi Arena, Aarhus; Attendance: 3,070; Referees: Stoļarovs, Līcis (LAT)
19 January 2014; 18:00	Igropulo 11	(13–20)	Jakobsson 7	NRGi Arena, Aarhus; Attendance: 3,070; Referees: Stoļarovs, Līcis (LAT)
19 January 2014; 18:00	3× (yellow card) 2× (suspension)	Report	4× (yellow card) 6× (suspension) 1× (red card)	NRGi Arena, Aarhus; Attendance: 3,070; Referees: Stoļarovs, Līcis (LAT)

19 January 2014; 20:15	France	27 – 25	Croatia	NRGi Arena, Aarhus; Attendance: 3,400; Referees: Gjeding, Hansen (DEN)
19 January 2014; 20:15	Karabatić, Guigou 7	(18–17)	Kopljar 7	NRGi Arena, Aarhus; Attendance: 3,400; Referees: Gjeding, Hansen (DEN)
19 January 2014; 20:15	2× (yellow card) 2× (suspension)	Report	4× (yellow card) 5× (suspension)	NRGi Arena, Aarhus; Attendance: 3,400; Referees: Gjeding, Hansen (DEN)

21 January 2014; 15:45	Russia	25 – 33	Croatia	NRGi Arena, Aarhus; Attendance: 2,000; Referees: Stark, Ştefan (ROU)
21 January 2014; 15:45	Poliakov 5	(11–16)	Horvat 7	NRGi Arena, Aarhus; Attendance: 2,000; Referees: Stark, Ştefan (ROU)
21 January 2014; 15:45	3× (yellow card) 2× (suspension)	Report	2× (yellow card) 1× (suspension)	NRGi Arena, Aarhus; Attendance: 2,000; Referees: Stark, Ştefan (ROU)

21 January 2014; 18:00	France	39 – 30	Belarus	NRGi Arena, Aarhus; Attendance: 2,100; Referees: Nikolić, Stojković (SRB)
21 January 2014; 18:00	Honrubia 9	(20–16)	Brouka, Nikulenkau 6	NRGi Arena, Aarhus; Attendance: 2,100; Referees: Nikolić, Stojković (SRB)
21 January 2014; 18:00	3× (yellow card) 1× (suspension)	Report	3× (yellow card) 3× (suspension)	NRGi Arena, Aarhus; Attendance: 2,100; Referees: Nikolić, Stojković (SRB)

21 January 2014; 20:15	Poland	35 – 25	Sweden	NRGi Arena, Aarhus; Attendance: 3,000; Referees: Raluy, Sabroso (ESP)
21 January 2014; 20:15	Lijewski 6	(15–12)	Ekdahl du Rietz 6	NRGi Arena, Aarhus; Attendance: 3,000; Referees: Raluy, Sabroso (ESP)
21 January 2014; 20:15	2× (yellow card) 3× (suspension)	Report	3× (yellow card) 1× (suspension)	NRGi Arena, Aarhus; Attendance: 3,000; Referees: Raluy, Sabroso (ESP)

22 January 2014; 15:45	Russia	39 – 33	Belarus	NRGi Arena, Aarhus; Attendance: 700; Referees: Nachevski, Nikolov (MKD)
22 January 2014; 15:45	Kovalev 12	(23–17)	Brouka 9	NRGi Arena, Aarhus; Attendance: 700; Referees: Nachevski, Nikolov (MKD)
22 January 2014; 15:45	4× (yellow card) 6× (suspension)	Report	3× (yellow card) 4× (suspension)	NRGi Arena, Aarhus; Attendance: 700; Referees: Nachevski, Nikolov (MKD)

22 January 2014; 18:00	France	28 – 30	Sweden	NRGi Arena, Aarhus; Attendance: 3,000; Referees: Geipel, Helbig (GER)
22 January 2014; 18:00	Joli 4	(16–14)	Jakobsson, Karlsson 6	NRGi Arena, Aarhus; Attendance: 3,000; Referees: Geipel, Helbig (GER)
22 January 2014; 18:00	3× (yellow card) 1× (suspension)	Report	3× (yellow card) 5× (suspension)	NRGi Arena, Aarhus; Attendance: 3,000; Referees: Geipel, Helbig (GER)

22 January 2014; 20:15	Poland	28 – 31	Croatia	NRGi Arena, Aarhus; Attendance: 3,700; Referees: Horáček, Novotný (CZE)
22 January 2014; 20:15	Jurecki 6	(15–14)	Duvnjak, Horvat, Štrlek 6	NRGi Arena, Aarhus; Attendance: 3,700; Referees: Horáček, Novotný (CZE)
22 January 2014; 20:15	4× (yellow card) 2× (suspension)	Report	3× (yellow card) 6× (suspension)	NRGi Arena, Aarhus; Attendance: 3,700; Referees: Horáček, Novotný (CZE)

== Knockout stage ==
Venue: Jyske Bank Boxen, Herning

=== Bracket ===
Semi-finals
24 January – Herning
Denmark	29
Croatia	27
24 January – Herning
France	30
Spain	27

Final
26 January – Herning
Denmark	32
France	41
Third place
26 January – Herning
Croatia	28
Spain	29

=== Semifinals ===
24 January 2014; 18:30	France	30 – 27	Spain	Jyske Bank Boxen, Herning; Attendance: 14,000; Referees: Krstić, Ljubič (SLO)
24 January 2014; 18:30	Abalo 8	(12–14)	Cañellas 10	Jyske Bank Boxen, Herning; Attendance: 14,000; Referees: Krstić, Ljubič (SLO)
24 January 2014; 18:30	4× (yellow card) 7× (suspension) 1× (red card)	Report	4× (yellow card) 4× (suspension)	Jyske Bank Boxen, Herning; Attendance: 14,000; Referees: Krstić, Ljubič (SLO)

24 January 2014; 21:00	Denmark	29 – 27	Croatia	Jyske Bank Boxen, Herning; Attendance: 14,000; Referees: Geipel, Helbig (GER)
24 January 2014; 21:00	Eggert 8	(13–15)	Kopljar, Horvat 6	Jyske Bank Boxen, Herning; Attendance: 14,000; Referees: Geipel, Helbig (GER)
24 January 2014; 21:00	4× (yellow card) 6× (suspension)	Report	4× (yellow card) 6× (suspension)	Jyske Bank Boxen, Herning; Attendance: 14,000; Referees: Geipel, Helbig (GER)

=== Fifth place game ===
24 January 2014; 16:00	Iceland	28 – 27	Poland	Jyske Bank Boxen, Herning; Attendance: 9,000; Referees: Nachevski, Nikolov (MKD)
24 January 2014; 16:00	Guðjónsson 8	(13–16)	Kuchczyński 5	Jyske Bank Boxen, Herning; Attendance: 9,000; Referees: Nachevski, Nikolov (MKD)
24 January 2014; 16:00	3× (yellow card) 3× (suspension)	Report	3× (yellow card) 3× (suspension)	Jyske Bank Boxen, Herning; Attendance: 9,000; Referees: Nachevski, Nikolov (MKD)

=== Third place game ===
26 January 2014; 15:00	Croatia	28 – 29	Spain	Jyske Bank Boxen, Herning; Attendance: 14,000; Referees: Stark, Ştefan (ROU)
26 January 2014; 15:00	Duvnjak 8	(13–16)	Cañellas 8	Jyske Bank Boxen, Herning; Attendance: 14,000; Referees: Stark, Ştefan (ROU)
26 January 2014; 15:00	3× (yellow card) 3× (suspension)	Report	3× (yellow card) 3× (suspension)	Jyske Bank Boxen, Herning; Attendance: 14,000; Referees: Stark, Ştefan (ROU)

=== Final ===
26 January 2014; 17:30	Denmark	32 – 41	France	Jyske Bank Boxen, Herning; Attendance: 14,000; Referees: Raluy, Sabroso (ESP)
26 January 2014; 17:30	Hansen 9	(16–23)	Guigou 10	Jyske Bank Boxen, Herning; Attendance: 14,000; Referees: Raluy, Sabroso (ESP)
26 January 2014; 17:30	3× (yellow card) 3× (suspension)	Report	3× (yellow card) 3× (suspension)	Jyske Bank Boxen, Herning; Attendance: 14,000; Referees: Raluy, Sabroso (ESP)

== Ranking and statistics ==
-

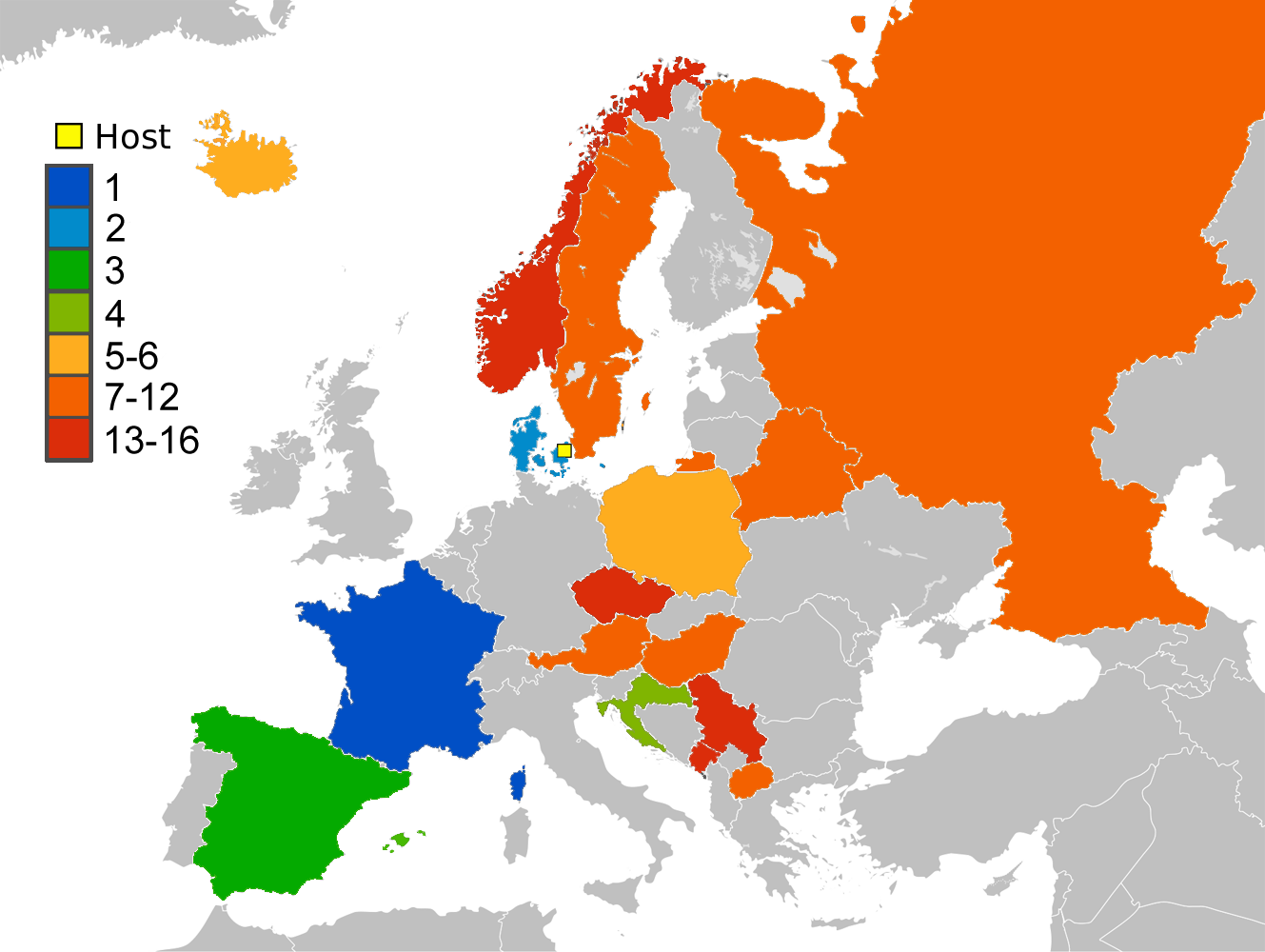
Final results

=== Final ranking ===
The final ranking for places 7 to 16 were determined by the team's group stage record.

Legend for qualification type
Qualified for the 2015 World Championship based on this tournament
Qualified for the 2015 World Championship as defending title holder

Rank	Team
Gold medal	France
Silver medal	Denmark
Bronze medal	Spain
4	Croatia
5	Iceland
6	Poland
7	Sweden
8	Hungary
9	Russia
10	Macedonia
11	Austria
12	Belarus
13	Serbia
14	Norway
15	Czech Republic
16	Montenegro

2014 Men's Handball European Champions

France
Third Title

=== All Star Team ===
The All-star team and award winners were announced on 26 January 2014.

Position	Player
Goalkeeper	Niklas Landin Jacobsen (DEN)
Right wing	Luc Abalo (FRA)
Right back	Krzysztof Lijewski (POL)
Centre back	Domagoj Duvnjak (CRO)
Left back	Mikkel Hansen (DEN)
Left wing	Guðjón Valur Sigurðsson (ISL)
Pivot	Julen Aguinagalde (ESP)

=== Other awards ===
Award	Player
Most Valuable Player	Nikola Karabatić (FRA)
Best Defence Player	Tobias Karlsson (SWE)
Topscorer	Joan Cañellas (ESP) (50 goals)

=== Top goalscorers ===
Rank	Name	Goals	Shots	%	MP
1	Joan Cañellas (ESP)	50	64	78	8
2	Guðjón Valur Sigurðsson (ISL)	44	60	73	7
3	Mikkel Hansen (DEN)	39	60	65	8
4	Kiril Lazarov (MKD)	38	74	51	6
5	Domagoj Duvnjak (CRO)	36	64	56	8
5	Michaël Guigou (FRA)	36	48	75	8
7	Siarhei Rutenka (BLR)	34	62	55	6
8	Zlatko Horvat (CRO)	33	45	73	8
9	Nikola Karabatić (FRA)	32	51	63	8
10	Luc Abalo (FRA)	31	43	72	8
10	Krzysztof Lijewski (POL)	31	54	54	7
10	Víctor Tomás (ESP)	31	45	69	8

Source: EHF.com
