= Guillaume Joli =

French handball player (born 1985)

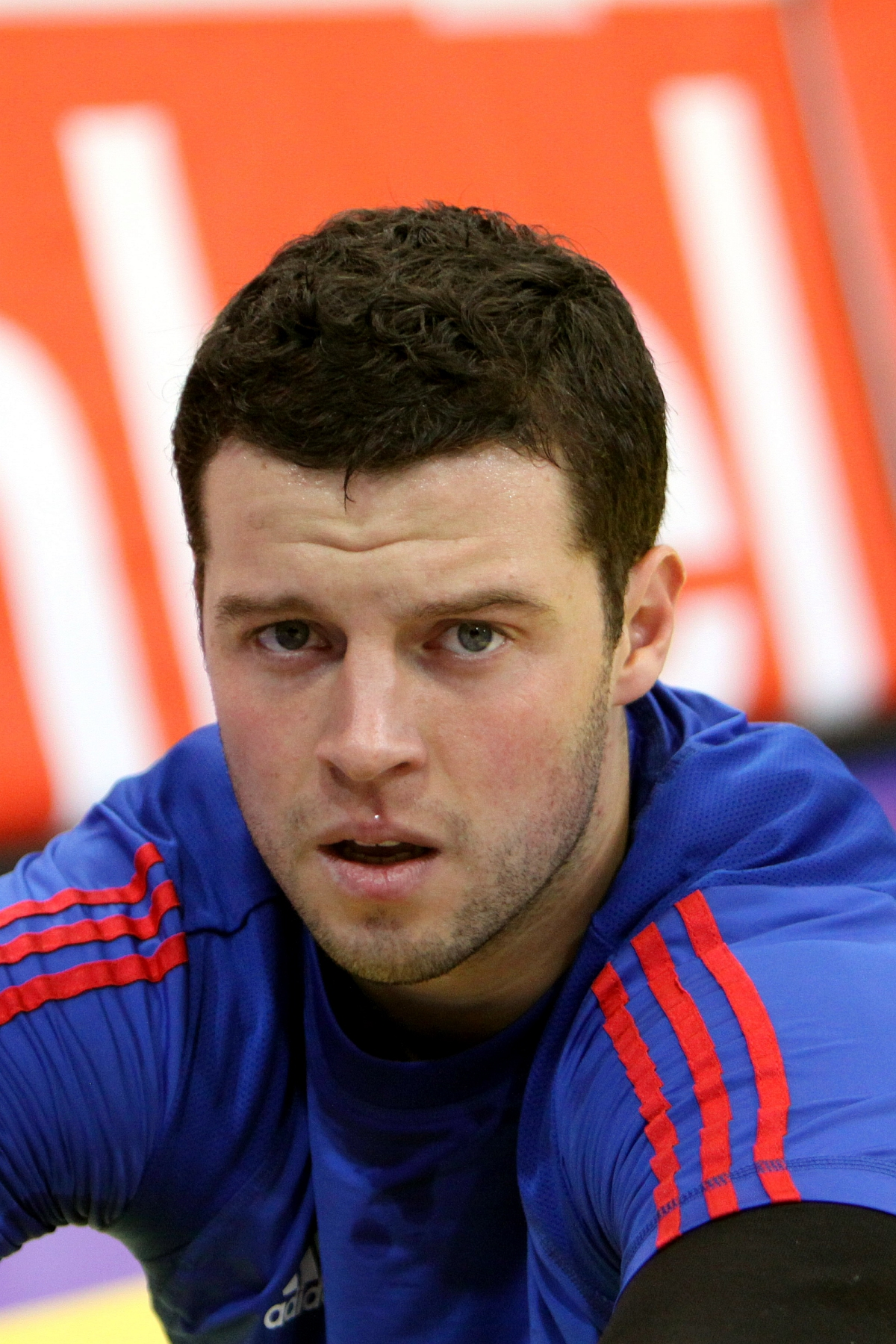

Personal information
- Nationality: French
- Born: March 27, 1985 (age 41) Lyon, France
- Height: 1.78 m (5 ft 10 in)

Sport
- Sport: Handball
- Position: Right wing

Youth career
- Years: Team
- 1994-2000: Tassin-la-Demi-Lune
- 2000-2002: HBC Villefranche-sur-Saône

Senior clubs
- Years: Team
- 2002-2004: Villeurbanne/Grand Lyon HB
- 2004-2010: Chambéry Savoie HB
- 2010-2012: BM Valladolid
- 2012-2014: Dunkerque HGL
- 2014-2016: HSG Wetzlar
- 2016-2019: Dunkerque HGL
National team
Years	Team	Apps	(Gls)
2006–2015	France	118	(346)

Teams managed
- 2021-09/2024: France U17
- 09/2024-08/26: France U21
- 03/2026-: France (assistant)
Medal record
Olympic Games
Gold medal – first place	2012 London	Team
World Championship
Gold medal – first place	2009 Croatia	Team
Gold medal – first place	2011 Sweden	Team
Gold medal – first place	2015 Qatar	Team
European Championship
Gold medal – first place	2010 Austria	Team
Gold medal – first place	2014 Denmark	Team

Guillaume Joli (born 27 March 1985) is a former French handballer. With the France men's national handball team, he won six gold medals: three at the World Championship (2009, 2011 and 2015), one at the 2012 Summer Olympics. and two at the European Championship (2010 and 2014).

In 2026, he is appointed assistant coach of Talant Dujshebaev in the France men's national handball team.

== Career ==
Joli joined Chambéry Savoie HB in 2004. Here he played in the 2007-08 EHF Cup and the 2006-07, 2008-09, and 2009-10 EHF Champions League. In September 2012 he joined Dunkerque Handball Grand Littoral. Here he won the 2013 French League Cup and 2014 French Championship.

In 2014 he joined German Bundesliga team HSG Wetzlar. In 2016 he returned to Dunkerque. He retired after the 2018-19 season.

=== National team ===
Joli debuted for the French national team on 16 June 2006 against Spain. In 2010 he won his first international title at the 2009 World Championship in Croatia. This was followed by gold medals at the 2010 European Championship in Austria, the 2012 Olympics and 2014 European Championship in Denmark. In 2015 he won his second World Championship title.

For much of his national team career, he was the second choice on the right-wing next to Luc Abalo.
