= Nenad Bilbija =

Slovenian handball player

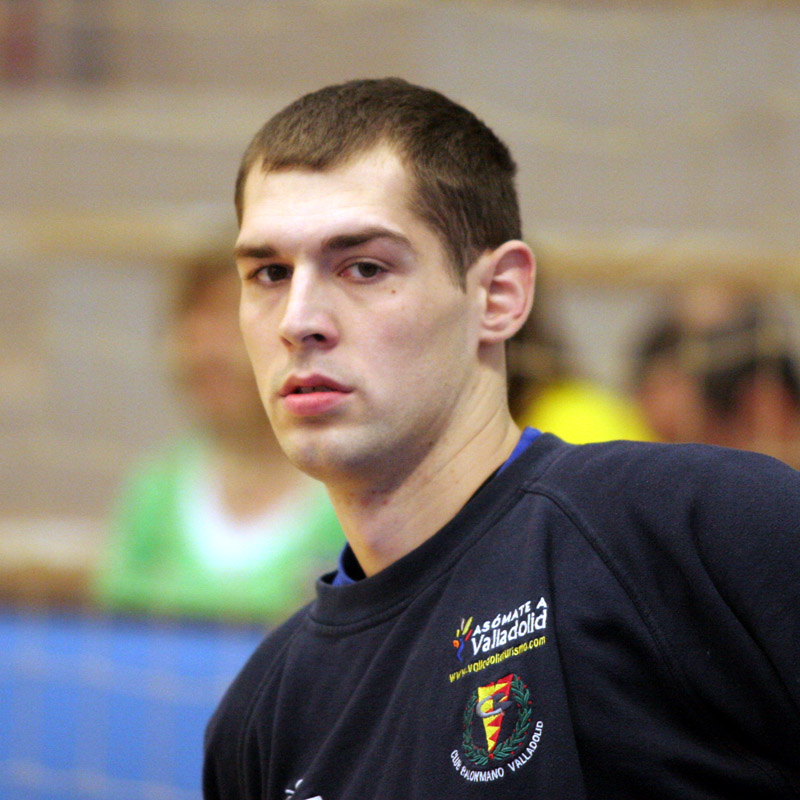
Nenad Bilbija

Nenad Bilbija (born 6 February 1984) is a professional handball player, currently playing for GWD Minden. Recently, he represented Slovenia at 2013 World Men's Handball Championship.
