= Michele Skatar =

Croatian-Italian handball player (born 1985)

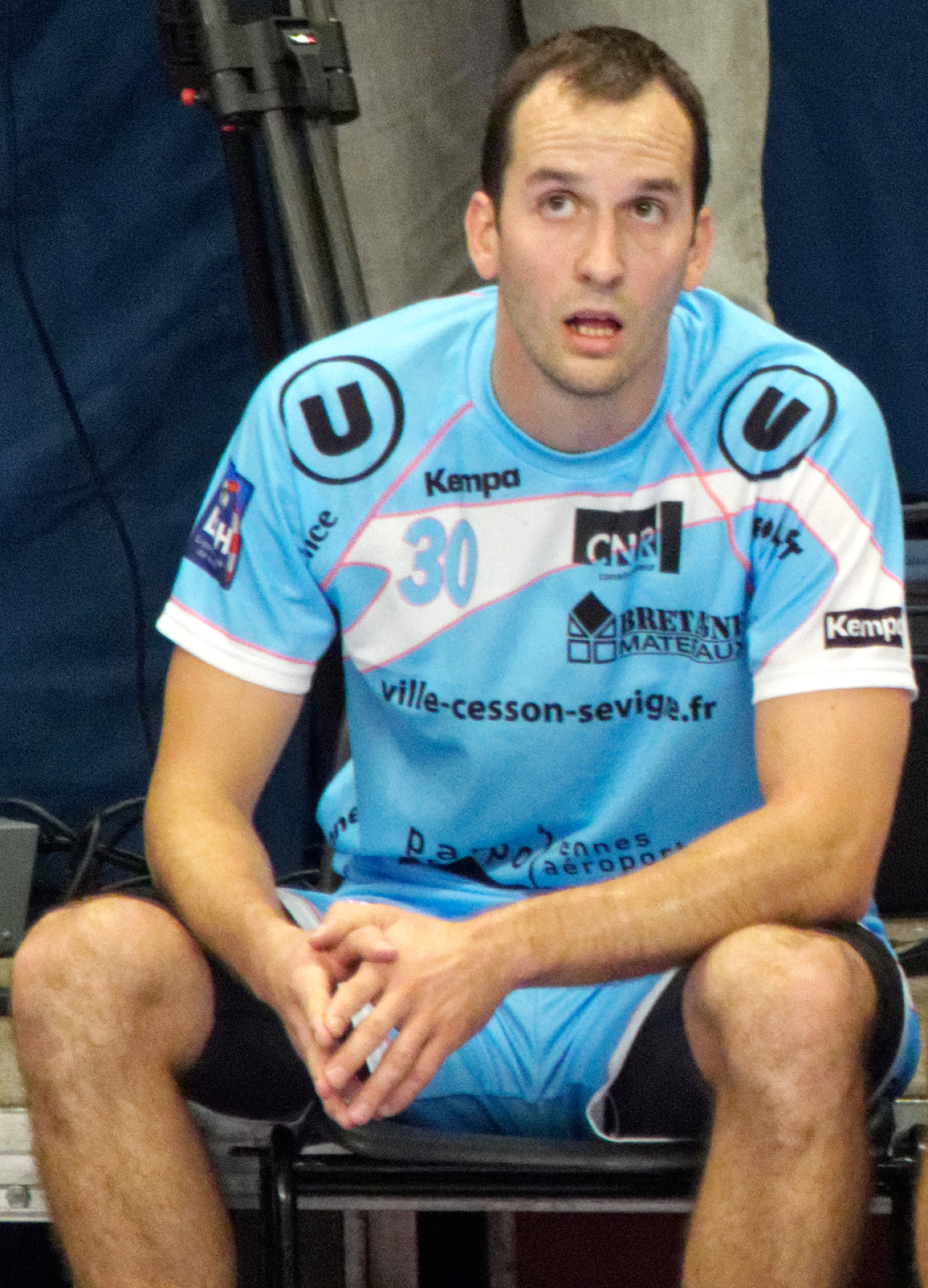
- Michele Skatar (2014)

Personal information
- Full name: Michele Skatar
- Born: December 30, 1985 (age 40) Koper, SFR Yugoslavia
- Height: 1.92 m (6 ft 3 1/2 in)

Sport
- Sport: Handball
- Position: Right Back

Senior clubs
- Years: Team
- 1999–2004: (Croatia) RK Umag
- 2004–2006: (Italy) Pallamano Trieste
- 2006–2007: (Germany) TSG Friesenheim
- 2007–2009: (Germany) TuS N-Lübbecke
- 2009–2010: (France) Mulhouse HSA
- 2010–01/14: (France) HBC Nantes
- 02/14–07/14: (Italy) Handball Carpi
- 2014–2016: (France) Cesson Rennes
- 2016–2017: (France) Montélimar Cruas HB
- 2017–2020: (France) Strasbourg Eurométropole
- 2020–01/21: (France) Soultz Bollwiller Handball
- 02/2021–05/21: (Italy) SSV Bozen Loacker
National team
| Years | Team | Apps | (Gls) |
| 2004-2021 | Italy | 141 | (589) |
Medal record
Men's Handball
EHF Cup
| Silver medal – second place | (Europe) EHF Cup 2013 | HBC Nantes |
- Updated on April 29, 2021 (UTC)

Michele Skatar (born December 30, 1985) is a Croatian naturalized Italian handball player, currently free agent, runner-up in the EHF Cup (2013). Skatar played for professional teams in Croatia, Italy, Germany and France. At international level, he represented the Italian national team on 141 occasions, scoring 589 goals. He earned his first cap against Turkey on December 27, 2004, and took part in the Mediterranean Games four times consecutively (2005, 2009, 2013 and 2018) with Italy. Skatar won the Capocannoniere (Serie A top goalscorer) award during the 2005–06 season and became the first Italian ever to play in the German Handball-Bundesliga and to reach a European Cup final. He is the younger brother of poet and sports agent Daniel Skatar.

== Honours ==
=== Club ===
==== 2. Handball-Bundesliga ====
- 2008-09

==== Italian Under-21 Championship ====
- 2005–06

==== Italian Handball Trophy ====
- 2004–05

==== EHF Cup ====
- Runner-up: 2012-13

==== Croatian Handball Cup ====
- Runner-up: 2002-03

==== Coupe de la Ligue ====
- Runner-up: 2012–13

==== Coppa Italia ====
- Runner-up: 2004–05, 2013–14

==== Serie A ====
- Runner-up: 2004–05

==== Italian Handball Trophy ====
- Runner-up: 2005–06

=== Individual ===
- (Italy) Serie A Top Scorer (233 goals): 2005–06
- (Italy) Italian Handball Trophy Top Scorer: 2005–06
- (Italy) Italian Under-21 Championship MVP: 2005–06
- (France) French D2 Proligue All-Star: 2009–10
- (France) French Nationale 1 Top Scorer (183 goals): 2017-18
