= Jakub Łucak =

Polish handball player (born 1989)

Personal information
- Nationality: Polish
- Born: 18 September 1989 (age 37) Kielce, Poland
- Height: 1.81 m (5 ft 11 in)

Sport
- Sport: Handball
- Position: Right wing

Senior clubs
- Years: Team
- 2008–2015: Chrobry Głogów
- 2015–2016: Vive Kielce
- 2015–2016: → Śląsk Wrocław (loan)
- 2016–2017: KPR Legionowo
National team
Years	Team	Apps	(Gls)
2013–2017	Poland	28	(37)

Jakub Łucak (born 18 September 1989 in Kielce, Poland) is a Polish retired handball player who played for the Polish national team.
