= Johan Jakobsson =

Swedish handball player (born 1987)

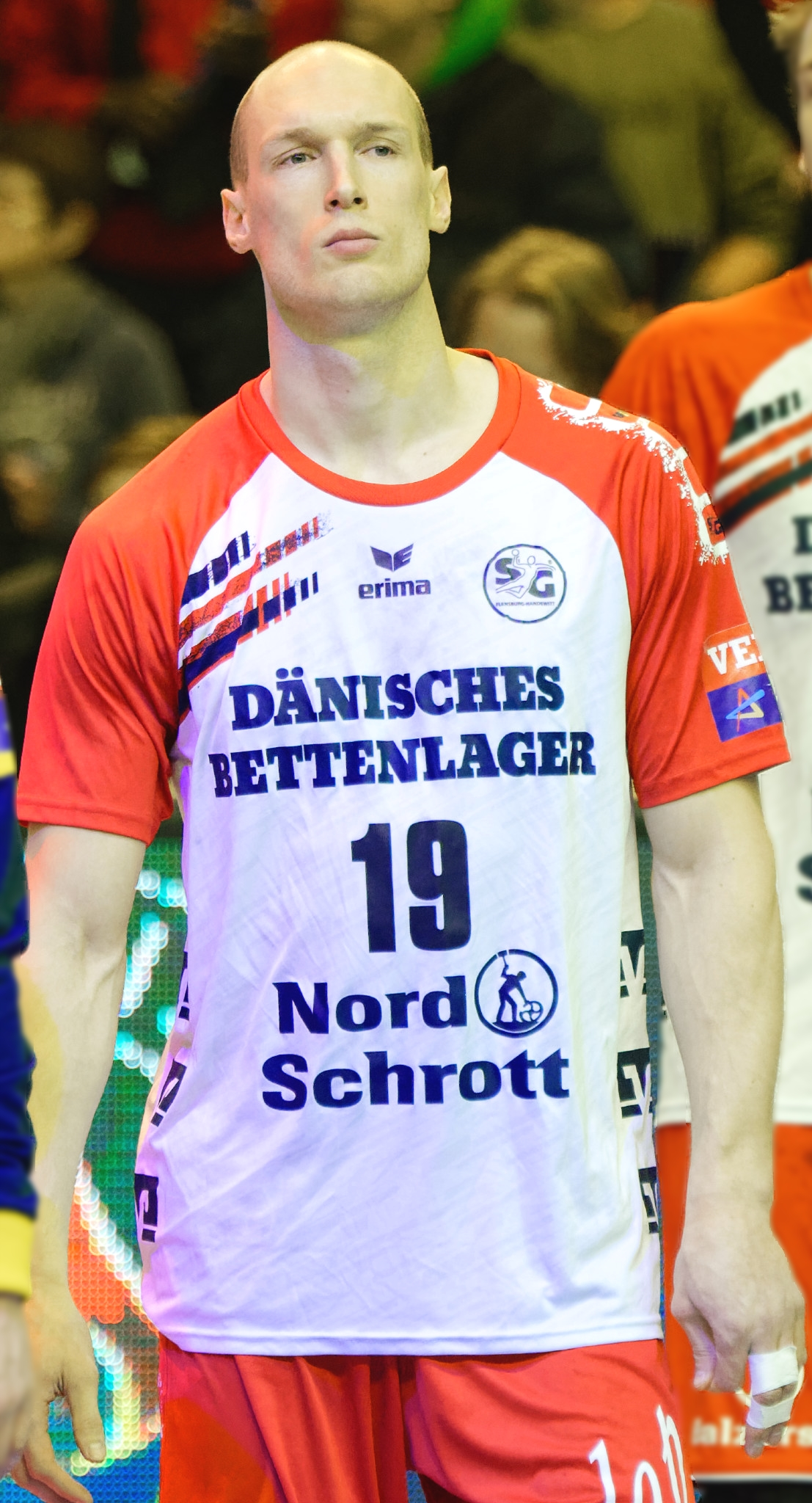
- Jakobsson in 2016

Personal information
- Full name: Johan Mikael Jakobsson
- Nationality: Swedish
- Born: 12 February 1987 (age 39) Gothenburg, Sweden
- Height: 1.95 m (6 ft 5 in)

Sport
- Sport: Handball
- Position: Right back

Youth career
- Years: Team
- 1997–2003: HP Warta

Senior clubs
- Years: Team
- 2003–2005: HP Warta
- 2005–2011: IK Sävehof
- 2011–2014: Aalborg Håndbold
- 2014–2017: SG Flensburg-Handewitt
- 2017–2019: IK Sävehof
National team
Years	Team	Apps	(Gls)
2007–2018	Sweden	121	(265)
Medal record
Olympic Games
Silver medal – second place	2012 London	Team
European Championship
Silver medal – second place	2018 Croatia

Johan Mikael Jakobsson (born 12 February 1987) is a Swedish former handball player. From 2014 to 2017 he played for german top team SG Flensburg-Handewitt.

Jakobsson participated with the Swedish national team in eight international championships: the 2009 World Championship, the 2010 European Championship, the 2011 World Championship (as a stand-in for Kim Andersson), the 2012 European Championship, the 2012 Olympic Games (where Sweden won the silver medal), the 2014 European Championship, the 2016 European Championship (All-Star Right back of the tournament), the 2016 Olympic Games, and the 2018 European Championship.

== Individual awards ==
- All-Star Right back of the Junior World Championship: 2007
- All-Star Right back of the European Championship: 2016
