= Luc Abalo =

French handball player (born 1984)

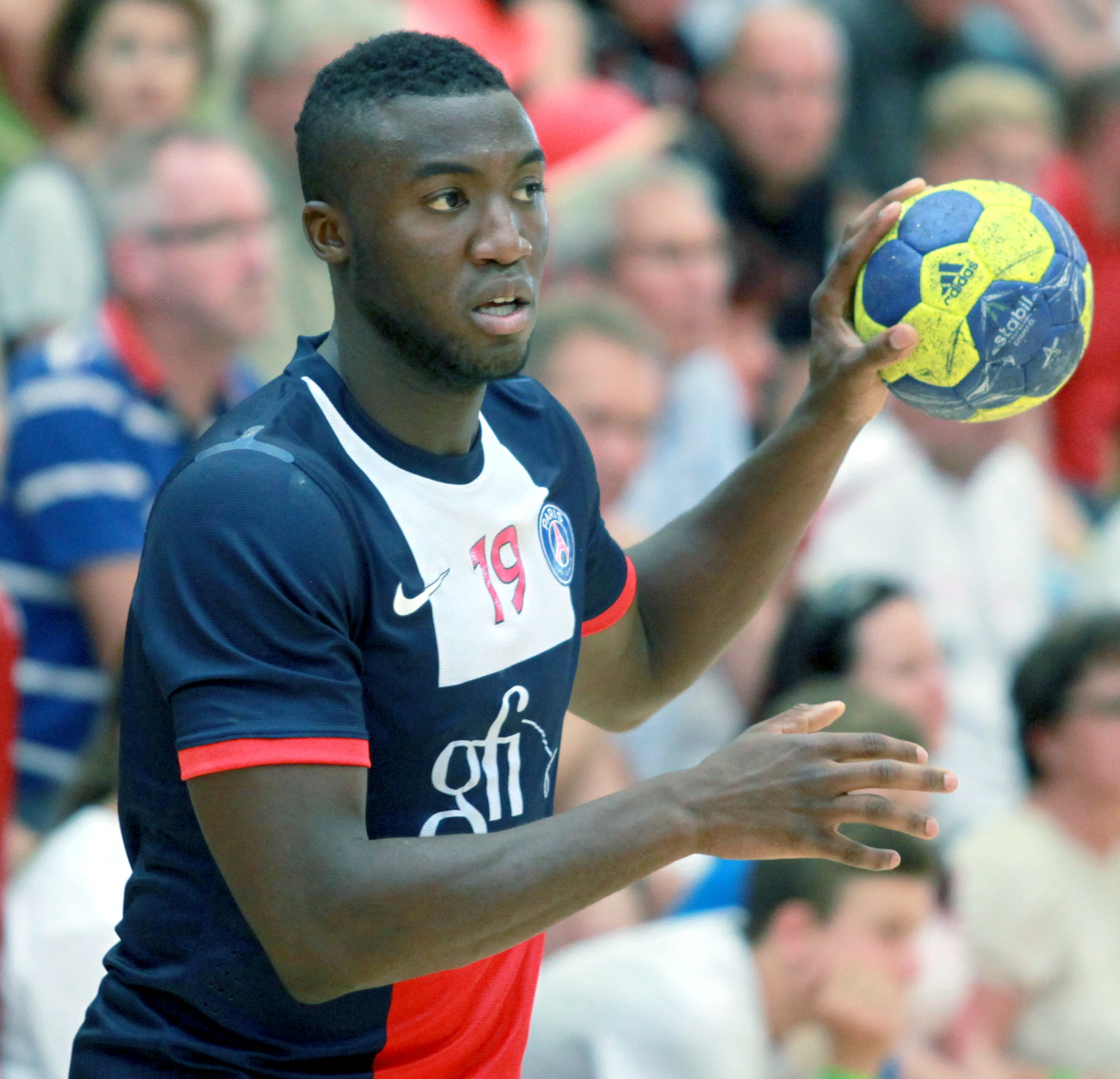
- Abalo in 2013

Personal information
- Nationality: French
- Born: 6 September 1984 (age 42) Ivry-sur-Seine, France
- Height: 1.82 m (6 ft 0 in)

Sport
- Sport: Handball
- Position: Right wing

Senior clubs
- Years: Team
- 1998–2008: US Ivry Handball
- 2008–2011: BM Ciudad Real
- 2011–2012: Atlético Madrid
- 2012–2020: Paris Saint-Germain
- 2020–2021: Elverum Håndball
- 2021–2023: Zeekstar Tokyo
National team
Years	Team	Apps	(Gls)
2005–2021	France	289	(859)
Medal record
Olympic Games
Gold medal – first place	2008 Beijing	Team
Gold medal – first place	2012 London	Team
Gold medal – first place	2020 Tokyo	Team
Silver medal – second place	2016 Rio de Janeiro	Team
World Championship
Gold medal – first place	2009 Croatia
Gold medal – first place	2011 Sweden
Gold medal – first place	2017 France
Bronze medal – third place	2019 Germany/Denmark
European Championship
Gold medal – first place	2006 Switzerland
Gold medal – first place	2010 Austria
Gold medal – first place	2014 Denmark
Bronze medal – third place	2008 Norway
Bronze medal – third place	2018 Croatia

Luc Kangny Abalo (born 6 September 1984) is a French retired handball player. He was inducted into the EHF Hall of Fame in 2024.

Being a member of the national team from 2005, he won gold medals at the 2008, 2012 and 2020 Olympics, 2009, 2011 and 2017 World and 2006, 2010 and 2014 European championships. He was named the French Division 1 Player of the Year in 2007, and the league's Best Right Wing in 2005, 2006 and 2007. In 2008 he received the Legion of Honour.

Abalo is an accomplished graphical artist. Upon a request from the French Olympic Committee he designed a wristband popularizing the Paris' bid for the 2024 Summer Olympics. Approximately 1.5 million copies were sold in September 2015.

Abalo is an officer of the Ordre national du Mérite and of the French Legion of Honour.

== Career ==
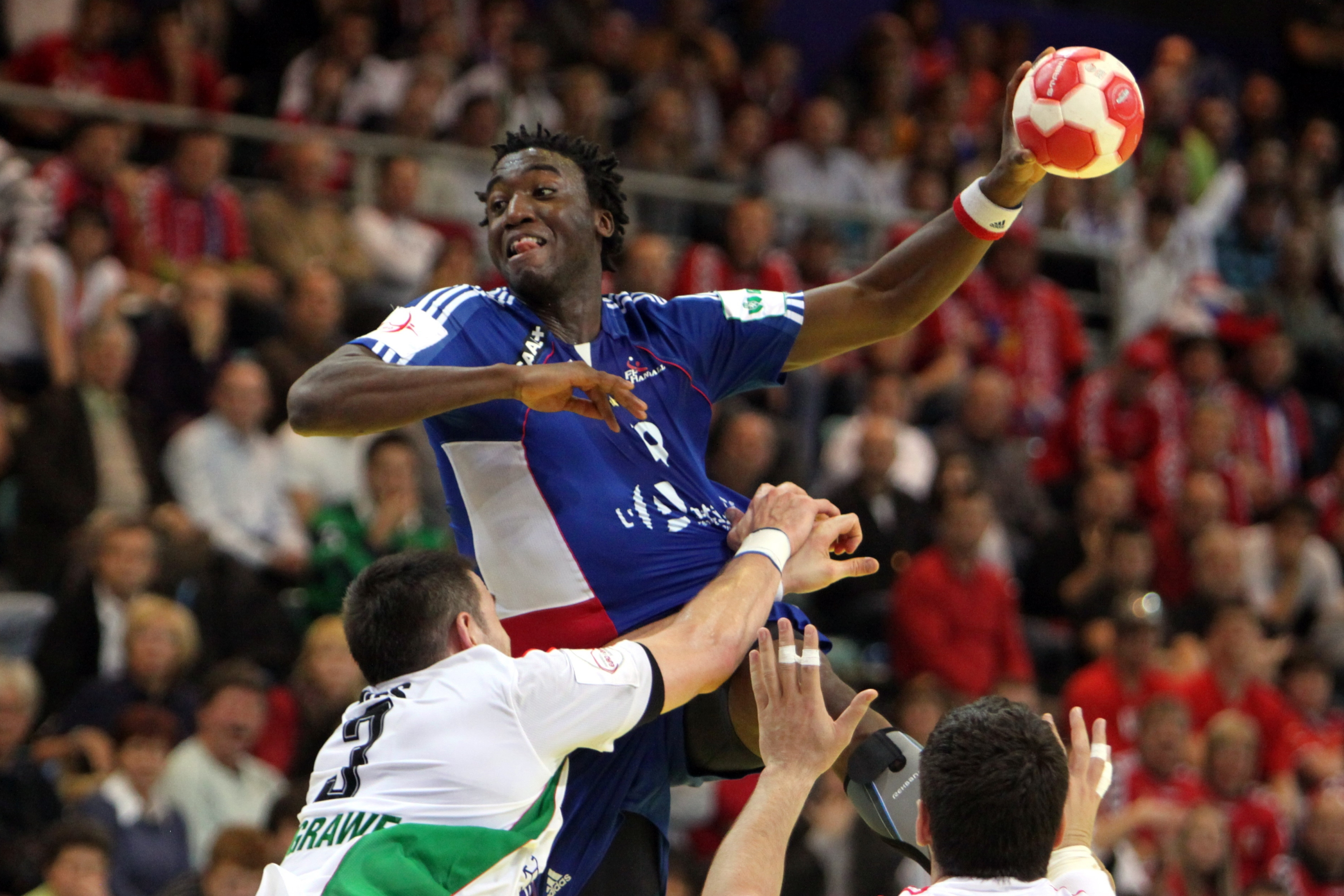
Luc Abalo in 2010 during a game for the French national team

Abalo signed his first professional contract at his hometown club US Ivry Handball in 2005. In his first season the team finished fourth in the top French league and reached the Cup final. In the 2006–07 season he won the French league. He was selected for the French league all star team as the right wing in 2005, 2006 and 2007. He joined Spanish side BM Ciudad Real in 2008 after originally planning to join them in 2007.

Here he won the Spanish championship and EHF Champions League in 2009, and the Spanish championship in 2010. In 2010-2011 he had a less successful season, where the team only won the Copa del Rey. The following summer he was rumored to join THW Kiel in Germany, because Ciudad Real had economic issues. Instead he stayed and transferred with the team to Atlético Madrid.

In 2012 he returned to France and joined Paris Saint-Germain. Here he won the French league in 2013 and every season from 2015 to 2020, and the French cup in 2014, 2015 and 2018.

In 2020 he announced his retirement from handball after the 2020 Olympics, but reconsidered when the Olympics where postponed until 2021. But since PSG had already found a replacement for him in Ferran Solé, Abalo had to find a new club. Therefore, he joined Norwegian team Elverum Håndball. Here he won the 2020 Norwegian cup and the 2021 Norwegian championship. After the 2021 World Championship in Egypt he could not return to Norway due to COVID-19 restrictions and only participated in the Champions League matches.

In September 2021 he joined Japanese side Zeekstar Tokyo. He retired in 2023.

== National team ==
Luc Abalo debuted for the senior French national team in 2005 against Turkey.

He has won both World Championship, European Championship and Olympic tournament. Between 2010 and 2013 he held all three major international tournaments.

He retired from the national team in 2021 after the 2020 Olympics (held in 2021).

== Titles ==
=== Club ===
- French Championship:
  - 2007 with US Ivry HB
  - 2013, 2015, 2016, 2017, 2018, 2019, 2020 with Paris Saint-Germain
- French Cup: 2014, 2015, 2018 with Paris Saint-Germain
- Spanish Championship: 2009, 2010 med BM Ciudad Real
- Copa del Rey: 2011
- EHF Champions League: 2009 with BM Ciudad Real
- IHF Super Globe: 2010 with BM Ciudad Real
- Norwegian Champion: 2021 with Elverum Håndball
- Norwegian Cup: 2020 with Elverum Håndball
