= 2025 IHF Emerging Nations Championship =

Handball event in Bulgaria

Tournament details
- Host country: Bulgaria
- Venue: 1 (in 1 host city)
- Dates: 11–16 March
- Teams: 8 (from 4 confederations)

Final positions
- Champions: Great Britain (1st title)
- Runners-up: Bulgaria
- Third place: United States
- Fourth place: Nigeria

Tournament statistics
- Matches played: 20
- Goals scored: 1,128 (56.4 per match)
- Attendance: 3,590 (180 per match)
- Top scorers: (Bulgaria) Svetlin Dimitrov (51 goals)

Awards
- Best player: (Bulgaria) Svetlin Dimitrov

The 2025 IHF Emerging Nations Handball Championship was the fifth edition of the IHF Emerging Nations Championship held in Bulgaria under the aegis of International Handball Federation from 11 to 16 March 2025.

Great Britain defeated Bulgaria in the final to capture their first title.

== Participating teams ==
Country	Previous appearances
Azerbaijan	3 (2017, 2019, 2023)
Bulgaria	4 (2015, 2017, 2019, 2023)
Cyprus	2 (2017, 2023)
Great Britain	4 (2015, 2017, 2019, 2023)
Moldova	3 (2015, 2017, 2023)
Nigeria	2 (2019, 2023)
Paraguay	0 (debut)
United States	1 (2019)

^{1} Bold indicates champion for that year. Italics indicates host.

== Draw ==
The draw was held on 28 January 2025 in Oslo.

=== Seeding ===
Pot 1	Pot 2	Pot 3	Pot 4
United States; Cyprus	Bulgaria; Azerbaijan	Nigeria; Great Britain	Moldova; Paraguay

== Preliminary round ==
All times are local (UTC+2).

=== Group A ===
Pos	Team	Pld	W	D	L	GF	GA	GD	Pts	Qualification
1	Bulgaria (H)	3	3	0	0	104	59	+45	**6**	Semifinals
2	Great Britain	3	2	0	1	92	85	+7	**4**	Semifinals
3	Paraguay	3	1	0	2	75	91	−16	**2**	5–8th place semifinals
4	Cyprus	3	0	0	3	65	101	−36	**0**	5–8th place semifinals

Source: IHF
Rules for classification: 1) points; 2) head-to-head points; 3) head-to-head goal difference; 4) head-to-head number of goals scored; 5) goal difference.
(H) Hosts

11 March 2025; 18:30	**Bulgaria**	**35–18**	**Paraguay**	Palace of Culture and Sports, Varna; Attendance: 350; Referees: Balvan, El-Saied, Cournil
11 March 2025; 18:30	Sv. Dimitrov 12	(19–10)	Ríos, Viana 4	Palace of Culture and Sports, Varna; Attendance: 350; Referees: Balvan, El-Saied, Cournil
11 March 2025; 18:30	3× (suspension)	Report	3× (suspension)	Palace of Culture and Sports, Varna; Attendance: 350; Referees: Balvan, El-Saied, Cournil

11 March 2025; 20:45	**Cyprus**	**23–37**	**Great Britain**	Palace of Culture and Sports, Varna; Attendance: 80; Referees: Lončar, Pagh, Ismoilov
11 March 2025; 20:45	Karkalatos, Paraskeva 6	(15–20)	Pereira, S. Vellenoweth 7	Palace of Culture and Sports, Varna; Attendance: 80; Referees: Lončar, Pagh, Ismoilov
11 March 2025; 20:45	1× (yellow card) 4× (suspension)	Report	2× (suspension)	Palace of Culture and Sports, Varna; Attendance: 80; Referees: Lončar, Pagh, Ismoilov

12 March 2025; 18:00	**Bulgaria**	**35–22**	**Great Britain**	Palace of Culture and Sports, Varna; Attendance: 400; Referees: Lončar, Thygesen, Fabryczny
12 March 2025; 18:00	Sv. Dimitrov 16	(21–13)	Pereira 5	Palace of Culture and Sports, Varna; Attendance: 400; Referees: Lončar, Thygesen, Fabryczny
12 March 2025; 18:00	1× (yellow card) 4× (suspension)	Report	4× (suspension)	Palace of Culture and Sports, Varna; Attendance: 400; Referees: Lončar, Thygesen, Fabryczny

12 March 2025; 20:15	**Paraguay**	**30–23**	**Cyprus**	Palace of Culture and Sports, Varna; Attendance: 20; Referees: Lončar, Pagh, Ismoilov
12 March 2025; 20:15	Rojas 8	(14–12)	Tartios 6	Palace of Culture and Sports, Varna; Attendance: 20; Referees: Lončar, Pagh, Ismoilov
12 March 2025; 20:15	3× (suspension) 1× (red card)	Report	4× (suspension) 1× (red card)	Palace of Culture and Sports, Varna; Attendance: 20; Referees: Lončar, Pagh, Ismoilov

13 March 2025; 18:00	**Cyprus**	**19–34**	**Bulgaria**	Palace of Culture and Sports, Varna; Attendance: 400; Referees: Prastalo, Rawicki, Ismoilov
13 March 2025; 18:00	Melissas, Tartios 5	(10–18)	Sv. Dimitrov 10	Palace of Culture and Sports, Varna; Attendance: 400; Referees: Prastalo, Rawicki, Ismoilov
13 March 2025; 18:00	2× (suspension) 1× (red card)	Report	3× (suspension)	Palace of Culture and Sports, Varna; Attendance: 400; Referees: Prastalo, Rawicki, Ismoilov

13 March 2025; 20:15	**Great Britain**	**33–27**	**Paraguay**	Palace of Culture and Sports, Varna; Attendance: 50; Referees: El-Saied, Lamour, Fabryczny
13 March 2025; 20:15	Pereira 11	(17–14)	Martínez 8	Palace of Culture and Sports, Varna; Attendance: 50; Referees: El-Saied, Lamour, Fabryczny
13 March 2025; 20:15	1× (yellow card) 2× (suspension)	Report	3× (suspension)	Palace of Culture and Sports, Varna; Attendance: 50; Referees: El-Saied, Lamour, Fabryczny

=== Group B ===
Pos	Team	Pld	W	D	L	GF	GA	GD	Pts	Qualification
1	United States	3	2	1	0	118	79	+39	**5 (Note: United States 31–31 Nigeria)**	Semifinals
2	Nigeria	3	2	1	0	85	70	+15	**5**	Semifinals
3	Moldova	3	1	0	2	81	88	−7	**2**	5–8th place semifinals
4	Azerbaijan	3	0	0	3	60	107	−47	**0**	5–8th place semifinals

Source: IHF
Rules for classification: 1) points; 2) head-to-head points; 3) head-to-head goal difference; 4) head-to-head number of goals scored; 5) goal difference.
Notes:

11 March 2025; 13:30	**Azerbaijan**	**21–33**	**Moldova**	Palace of Culture and Sports, Varna; Attendance: 100; Referees: Doychinov, Fabryczny, Ismoilov
11 March 2025; 13:30	Musayev 6	(8–14)	Ledeniov 7	Palace of Culture and Sports, Varna; Attendance: 100; Referees: Doychinov, Fabryczny, Ismoilov
11 March 2025; 13:30	3× (suspension)	Report	2× (suspension)	Palace of Culture and Sports, Varna; Attendance: 100; Referees: Doychinov, Fabryczny, Ismoilov

11 March 2025; 15:45	**United States**	**31–31**	**Nigeria**	Palace of Culture and Sports, Varna; Attendance: 50; Referees: Goretsov, Lončar, Thygesen
11 March 2025; 15:45	Amitovic 10	(18–12)	Shagari 7	Palace of Culture and Sports, Varna; Attendance: 50; Referees: Goretsov, Lončar, Thygesen
11 March 2025; 15:45	1× (yellow card) 4× (suspension)	Report	5× (suspension)	Palace of Culture and Sports, Varna; Attendance: 50; Referees: Goretsov, Lončar, Thygesen

12 March 2025; 13:30	**Moldova**	**26–42**	**United States**	Palace of Culture and Sports, Varna; Attendance: 100; Referees: Cournil, Balvan, Rawicki
12 March 2025; 13:30	Zacaciurin 8	(14–18)	Donlin 8	Palace of Culture and Sports, Varna; Attendance: 100; Referees: Cournil, Balvan, Rawicki
12 March 2025; 13:30	1× (yellow card) 3× (suspension)	Report	5× (suspension)	Palace of Culture and Sports, Varna; Attendance: 100; Referees: Cournil, Balvan, Rawicki

12 March 2025; 15:45	**Azerbaijan**	**17–29**	**Nigeria**	Palace of Culture and Sports, Varna; Attendance: 50; Referees: Prastalo, El-Saied, Lamour
12 March 2025; 15:45	Guliyev 6	(8–9)	Shagari 7	Palace of Culture and Sports, Varna; Attendance: 50; Referees: Prastalo, El-Saied, Lamour
12 March 2025; 15:45	3× (suspension)	Report	3× (suspension)	Palace of Culture and Sports, Varna; Attendance: 50; Referees: Prastalo, El-Saied, Lamour

13 March 2025; 13:30	**Nigeria**	**25–22**	**Moldova**	Palace of Culture and Sports, Varna; Attendance: 60; Referees: Goretsov, Lončar, Thygesen
13 March 2025; 13:30	Yusuf 8	(14–12)	Baltean 5	Palace of Culture and Sports, Varna; Attendance: 60; Referees: Goretsov, Lončar, Thygesen
13 March 2025; 13:30	5× (suspension) 1× (red card)	Report	2× (suspension)	Palace of Culture and Sports, Varna; Attendance: 60; Referees: Goretsov, Lončar, Thygesen

13 March 2025; 15:45	**United States**	**45–25**	**Azerbaijan**	Palace of Culture and Sports, Varna; Attendance: 40; Referees: Balvan, Doychinov, El-Saied
13 March 2025; 15:45	Binderis 7	(19–11)	Mammadli, Mehdiyev 5	Palace of Culture and Sports, Varna; Attendance: 40; Referees: Balvan, Doychinov, El-Saied
13 March 2025; 15:45	1× (yellow card) 1× (suspension)	Report	2× (yellow card) 9× (suspension) 1× (red card)	Palace of Culture and Sports, Varna; Attendance: 40; Referees: Balvan, Doychinov, El-Saied

== Knockout stage ==
=== Bracket ===
Semi-finals
15 March
**Bulgaria**	**30**
Nigeria	23
15 March
United States	25
**Great Britain**	**29**

Final
16 March
Bulgaria	25
**Great Britain**	**29**
Third place
16 March
Nigeria	28
**United States**	**31**

Fifth place bracket

5–8th place semifinals
15 March
**Paraguay**	**34**
Azerbaijan	22
15 March
Moldova	23
**Cyprus**	**24**

Fifth place game
16 March
**Paraguay**	**37**
Cyprus	28
Seventh place game
16 March
Azerbaijan	28
**Moldova**	**29**

=== 5–8th place semifinals ===
15 March 2025; 13:00	**Paraguay**	**34–22**	**Azerbaijan**	Palace of Culture and Sports, Varna; Attendance: 50; Referees: Goretsov, El-Saied, Cournil
15 March 2025; 13:00	Rojas 8	(14–8)	Nazaraliyev 6	Palace of Culture and Sports, Varna; Attendance: 50; Referees: Goretsov, El-Saied, Cournil
15 March 2025; 13:00	1× (suspension)	Report	4× (suspension)	Palace of Culture and Sports, Varna; Attendance: 50; Referees: Goretsov, El-Saied, Cournil

15 March 2025; 15:15	**Moldova**	**23–24**	**Cyprus**	Palace of Culture and Sports, Varna; Attendance: 80; Referees: Doychinov, Lamour, Ismoilov
15 March 2025; 15:15	Caraman 8	(11–11)	Karkalatos 7	Palace of Culture and Sports, Varna; Attendance: 80; Referees: Doychinov, Lamour, Ismoilov
15 March 2025; 15:15	4× (suspension) 1× (red card)	Report	2× (suspension)	Palace of Culture and Sports, Varna; Attendance: 80; Referees: Doychinov, Lamour, Ismoilov

=== Semifinals ===
15 March 2025; 17:30	**Bulgaria**	**30–23**	**Nigeria**	Palace of Culture and Sports, Varna; Attendance: 550; Referees: Lončar, El-Saied, Rawicki
15 March 2025; 17:30	Sv. Dimitrov 13	(15–8)	Yusuf 8	Palace of Culture and Sports, Varna; Attendance: 550; Referees: Lončar, El-Saied, Rawicki
15 March 2025; 17:30	5× (suspension)	Report	1× (yellow card) 6× (suspension)	Palace of Culture and Sports, Varna; Attendance: 550; Referees: Lončar, El-Saied, Rawicki

15 March 2025; 20:15	**United States**	**25–29**	**Great Britain**	Palace of Culture and Sports, Varna; Attendance: 60; Referees: Prastalo, Pagh, Ismoilov
15 March 2025; 20:15	Hansen 8	(14–13)	Pereira 8	Palace of Culture and Sports, Varna; Attendance: 60; Referees: Prastalo, Pagh, Ismoilov
15 March 2025; 20:15	1× (yellow card) 6× (suspension)	Report	1× (yellow card) 3× (suspension)	Palace of Culture and Sports, Varna; Attendance: 60; Referees: Prastalo, Pagh, Ismoilov

=== Seventh place game ===
16 March 2025; 13:00	**Azerbaijan**	**28–29**	**Moldova**	Palace of Culture and Sports, Varna; Attendance: 20; Referees: Balvan, Pagh, Ismoilov
16 March 2025; 13:00	Mammadli, Nazaraliyev 7	(14–20)	Ledeniov 9	Palace of Culture and Sports, Varna; Attendance: 20; Referees: Balvan, Pagh, Ismoilov
16 March 2025; 13:00	3× (suspension)	Report	4× (suspension)	Palace of Culture and Sports, Varna; Attendance: 20; Referees: Balvan, Pagh, Ismoilov

=== Fifth place game ===
16 March 2025; 15:15	**Paraguay**	**37–28**	**Cyprus**	Palace of Culture and Sports, Varna; Attendance: 30; Referees: Goretsov, Lončar, El-Saied
16 March 2025; 15:15	Rojas 8	(17–16)	Hadjipetrou 6	Palace of Culture and Sports, Varna; Attendance: 30; Referees: Goretsov, Lončar, El-Saied
16 March 2025; 15:15	4× (suspension)	Report		Palace of Culture and Sports, Varna; Attendance: 30; Referees: Goretsov, Lončar, El-Saied

=== Third place game ===
16 March 2025; 17:30	**Nigeria**	**28–31**	**United States**	Palace of Culture and Sports, Varna; Attendance: 100; Referees: Doychinov, Thygesen, Cournil
16 March 2025; 17:30	Yusuf 13	(14–19)	Hansen, Stromberg 8	Palace of Culture and Sports, Varna; Attendance: 100; Referees: Doychinov, Thygesen, Cournil
16 March 2025; 17:30	1× (yellow card) 2× (suspension)	Report	1× (suspension)	Palace of Culture and Sports, Varna; Attendance: 100; Referees: Doychinov, Thygesen, Cournil

=== Final ===
16 March 2025; 20:15	**Bulgaria**	**25–29**	**Great Britain**	Palace of Culture and Sports, Varna; Attendance: 1,000; Referees: El-Saied, Fabryczny, Ismoilov
16 March 2025; 20:15	Vasilev 7	(13–15)	Pereira 7	Palace of Culture and Sports, Varna; Attendance: 1,000; Referees: El-Saied, Fabryczny, Ismoilov
16 March 2025; 20:15	2× (yellow card) 4× (suspension) 1× (red card)	Report	2× (yellow card) 4× (suspension)	Palace of Culture and Sports, Varna; Attendance: 1,000; Referees: El-Saied, Fabryczny, Ismoilov

== Final ranking ==
Rank	Team
1st place, gold medalist(s)	Great Britain
2nd place, silver medalist(s)	Bulgaria
3rd place, bronze medalist(s)	United States
4	Nigeria
5	Paraguay
6	Cyprus
7	Moldova
8	Azerbaijan

== Statistics ==
=== Top goalscorers ===
Rank	Name	Goals	Shots	%
1	(Bulgaria) Svetlin Dimitrov	51	61	84
2	(Nigeria) Faruk Yusuf	40	59	68
3	(United Kingdom) Francisco Pereira	38	61	62
4	(Bulgaria) Kristian Vasilev	30	42	71
4	(Paraguay) Jorge Rojas	30	42	71
6	(United States) Andrew Donlin	28	39	72
7	(Moldova) Vladislav Caraman	27	46	59
7	(United States) Amar Amitovic	27	50	54
9	(Bulgaria) Mihael Ivanov	26	49	53
10	(Moldova) Victor Ledeniov	25	39	64
10	(United States) Gary Phillips	25	37	68

Source: IHF

=== Top goalkeepers ===
Rank	Name	%	Saves	Shots
1	(Bulgaria) Nikolay Petrov	41	67	164
2	(Moldova) Ion Saharnean	39	77	197
3	(United States) Pal Merkovszky	37	61	165
4	(United Kingdom) Kylian Ferrier	37	68	185
5	(United Kingdom) James Adamson	33	8	24
6	(Nigeria) Obinna Okwor	33	54	166
7	(Paraguay) Martín Giménez	32	52	163
8	(Cyprus) Andreas Papalambrianou	29	38	131
9	(Azerbaijan) Huseyn Gafarov	27	43	161
10	(Bulgaria) Stefan Dimitrov	24	4	17

Source: IHF

== All-Star Team ==
The all-star team and awards was announced on 16 March 2025.

Position	Player
Goalkeeper	(Bulgaria) Nikolay Petrov
Right wing	(United States) Gary Phillips
Right back	(United Kingdom) Francisco Pereira
Centre back	(Bulgaria) Kristian Vasilev
Left back	(United Kingdom) Sebastian Vellenoweth
Left wing	(United Kingdom) Louis Christy
Pivot	(United States) Andrew Donlin
Best defender	(United States) Andrew Donlin
Most valuable player	(Bulgaria) Svetlin Dimitrov
