= 2023 IHF Emerging Nations Championship =

Handball event in Bulgaria

Tournament details
- Host country: Bulgaria
- Venue: 1 (in 1 host city)
- Dates: 25–30 April
- Teams: 12 (from 5 confederations)

Final positions
- Champions: Cuba (1st title)
- Runners-up: Cyprus
- Third place: Bulgaria
- Fourth place: India

Tournament statistics
- Matches played: 24
- Goals scored: 1,261 (52.54 per match)
- Attendance: 3,623 (151 per match)
- Top scorers: (United Kingdom) Francesco Pereira (34 goals)

Awards
- Best player: (Cuba) Hanser Rodríguez

The 2023 IHF Emerging Nations Handball Championship was the fourth edition of the IHF Emerging Nations Championship held in Bulgaria under the aegis of International Handball Federation from 25 to 30 April 2023.

Cuba won the tournament for the first time by defeating Cyprus in the final.

== Participating teams ==
Country	Previous appearances
Andorra	2 (2015, 2017)
Australia	1 (2015)
Azerbaijan	2 (2017, 2019)
Bulgaria	3 (2015, 2017, 2019)
Cuba	1 (2019)
Cyprus	1 (2017)
Great Britain	3 (2015, 2017, 2019)
Guatemala	0 (debut)
India	1 (2019)
Malta	3 (2015, 2017, 2019)
Moldova	2 (2015, 2017)
Nigeria	1 (2019)

^{1} Bold indicates champion for that year. Italics indicates host.

== Draw ==
The draw was held on 10 March 2023.

== Preliminary round ==
All times are local (UTC+3).

=== Group A ===
Pos	Team	Pld	W	D	L	GF	GA	GD	Pts	Qualification
1	India	2	2	0	0	59	54	+5	**4**	Semifinals
2	Andorra	2	1	0	1	52	53	−1	**2**	5–8th place semifinals
3	Malta	2	0	0	2	58	62	−4	**0**	9–12th place semifinals

Source: IHF
Rules for classification: 1) points; 2) head-to-head points; 3) head-to-head goal difference; 4) head-to-head number of goals scored; 5) goal difference.

25 April 2023; 12:15	**Malta**	**27–29**	**Andorra**	Palace of Culture and Sports, Varna; Attendance: 111; Referees: Linster, Rauchs (LUX)
25 April 2023; 12:15	Gruppetta 10	(12–12)	Ruiz 11	Palace of Culture and Sports, Varna; Attendance: 111; Referees: Linster, Rauchs (LUX)
25 April 2023; 12:15	2× (yellow card) 5× (suspension)	Report	6× (suspension)	Palace of Culture and Sports, Varna; Attendance: 111; Referees: Linster, Rauchs (LUX)

26 April 2023; 12:15	**Andorra**	**23–26**	**India**	Palace of Culture and Sports, Varna; Attendance: 52; Referees: Al-Wahibi, Al-Shahi (OMA)
26 April 2023; 12:15	Ruiz 10	(10–14)	Ankit 10	Palace of Culture and Sports, Varna; Attendance: 52; Referees: Al-Wahibi, Al-Shahi (OMA)
26 April 2023; 12:15	5× (suspension)	Report	5× (suspension) 1× (red card)	Palace of Culture and Sports, Varna; Attendance: 52; Referees: Al-Wahibi, Al-Shahi (OMA)

27 April 2023; 12:15	**Malta**	**31–33**	**India**	Palace of Culture and Sports, Varna; Attendance: 51; Referees: Doychinov, Goretsov (BUL)
27 April 2023; 12:15	Spiteri 9	(14–15)	Amit, Mohit 10	Palace of Culture and Sports, Varna; Attendance: 51; Referees: Doychinov, Goretsov (BUL)
27 April 2023; 12:15	1× (yellow card) 3× (suspension) 1× (red card)	Report	1× (suspension)	Palace of Culture and Sports, Varna; Attendance: 51; Referees: Doychinov, Goretsov (BUL)

=== Group B ===
Pos	Team	Pld	W	D	L	GF	GA	GD	Pts	Qualification
1	Cyprus	2	2	0	0	59	52	+7	**4**	Semifinals
2	Australia	2	1	0	1	46	46	0	**2**	5–8th place semifinals
3	Moldova	2	0	0	2	53	60	−7	**0**	9–12th place semifinals

Source: IHF
Rules for classification: 1) points; 2) head-to-head points; 3) head-to-head goal difference; 4) head-to-head number of goals scored; 5) goal difference.

25 April 2023; 14:30	**Cyprus**	**35–31**	**Moldova**	Palace of Culture and Sports, Varna; Attendance: 50; Referees: Doychinov, Goretsov (BUL)
25 April 2023; 14:30	Charalambous 10	(19–13)	Vasilatii 10	Palace of Culture and Sports, Varna; Attendance: 50; Referees: Doychinov, Goretsov (BUL)
25 April 2023; 14:30	2× (yellow card) 3× (suspension)	Report	5× (suspension)	Palace of Culture and Sports, Varna; Attendance: 50; Referees: Doychinov, Goretsov (BUL)

26 April 2023; 14:30	**Moldova**	**22–25**	**Australia**	Palace of Culture and Sports, Varna; Attendance: 70; Referees: Al-Enezi, Al-Naseem (KUW)
26 April 2023; 14:30	Martalog 6	(9–13)	Langenberg 7	Palace of Culture and Sports, Varna; Attendance: 70; Referees: Al-Enezi, Al-Naseem (KUW)
26 April 2023; 14:30	1× (yellow card) 5× (suspension)	Report	5× (suspension)	Palace of Culture and Sports, Varna; Attendance: 70; Referees: Al-Enezi, Al-Naseem (KUW)

27 April 2023; 14:30	**Cyprus**	**24–21**	**Australia**	Palace of Culture and Sports, Varna; Attendance: 63; Referees: Bozhinovski, Nachevski (MKD)
27 April 2023; 14:30	Charalambous 8	(11–11)	Warrener 6	Palace of Culture and Sports, Varna; Attendance: 63; Referees: Bozhinovski, Nachevski (MKD)
27 April 2023; 14:30	1× (suspension)	Report	1× (yellow card) 3× (suspension)	Palace of Culture and Sports, Varna; Attendance: 63; Referees: Bozhinovski, Nachevski (MKD)

=== Group C ===
Pos	Team	Pld	W	D	L	GF	GA	GD	Pts	Qualification
1	Cuba	2	2	0	0	59	45	+14	**4**	Semifinals
2	Great Britain	2	1	0	1	56	49	+7	**2**	5–8th place semifinals
3	Guatemala	2	0	0	2	34	55	−21	**0**	9–12th place semifinals

Source: IHF
Rules for classification: 1) points; 2) head-to-head points; 3) head-to-head goal difference; 4) head-to-head number of goals scored; 5) goal difference.

25 April 2023; 16:45	**Great Britain**	**28–32**	**Cuba**	Palace of Culture and Sports, Varna; Attendance: 120; Referees: Bozhinovski, Nachevski (MKD)
25 April 2023; 16:45	Vellenoweth 6	(14–13)	Rodríguez 7	Palace of Culture and Sports, Varna; Attendance: 120; Referees: Bozhinovski, Nachevski (MKD)
25 April 2023; 16:45	1× (yellow card) 3× (suspension)	Report	5× (suspension)	Palace of Culture and Sports, Varna; Attendance: 120; Referees: Bozhinovski, Nachevski (MKD)

26 April 2023; 16:45	**Cuba**	**27–17**	**Guatemala**	Palace of Culture and Sports, Varna; Attendance: 103; Referees: Araújo, Perdomo (URU)
26 April 2023; 16:45	Rodríguez 7	(15–5)	Herrera, Martínez 4	Palace of Culture and Sports, Varna; Attendance: 103; Referees: Araújo, Perdomo (URU)
26 April 2023; 16:45	1× (yellow card) 1× (suspension)	Report	2× (suspension)	Palace of Culture and Sports, Varna; Attendance: 103; Referees: Araújo, Perdomo (URU)

27 April 2023; 16:45	**Great Britain**	**28–17**	**Guatemala**	Palace of Culture and Sports, Varna; Attendance: 72; Referees: Al-Enezi, Al-Naseem (KUW)
27 April 2023; 16:45	Edgar, Pereira 8	(16–6)	Cetino, Soto 4	Palace of Culture and Sports, Varna; Attendance: 72; Referees: Al-Enezi, Al-Naseem (KUW)
27 April 2023; 16:45	5× (suspension)	Report	4× (suspension)	Palace of Culture and Sports, Varna; Attendance: 72; Referees: Al-Enezi, Al-Naseem (KUW)

=== Group D ===
Pos	Team	Pld	W	D	L	GF	GA	GD	Pts	Qualification
1	Bulgaria (H)	2	2	0	0	53	38	+15	**4**	Semifinals
2	Nigeria	2	1	0	1	54	40	+14	**2**	5–8th place semifinals
3	Azerbaijan	2	0	0	2	36	65	−29	**0**	9–12th place semifinals

Source: IHF
Rules for classification: 1) points; 2) head-to-head points; 3) head-to-head goal difference; 4) head-to-head number of goals scored; 5) goal difference.
(H) Hosts

25 April 2023; 19:00	**Azerbaijan**	**19–30**	**Bulgaria**	Palace of Culture and Sports, Varna; Attendance: 488; Referees: Mikelič, Paradina (CRO)
25 April 2023; 19:00	Guliyev 6	(9–14)	Sv. Dimitrov 7	Palace of Culture and Sports, Varna; Attendance: 488; Referees: Mikelič, Paradina (CRO)
25 April 2023; 19:00	1× (suspension)	Report	1× (yellow card) 2× (suspension)	Palace of Culture and Sports, Varna; Attendance: 488; Referees: Mikelič, Paradina (CRO)

26 April 2023; 19:00	**Bulgaria**	**23–19**	**Nigeria**	Palace of Culture and Sports, Varna; Attendance: 250; Referees: Ismoilov, Ismoilov (UZB)
26 April 2023; 19:00	Ivanov 7	(13–11)	F. Yusuf 6	Palace of Culture and Sports, Varna; Attendance: 250; Referees: Ismoilov, Ismoilov (UZB)
26 April 2023; 19:00	1× (yellow card) 7× (suspension) 1× (red card)	Report	4× (suspension) 1× (red card)	Palace of Culture and Sports, Varna; Attendance: 250; Referees: Ismoilov, Ismoilov (UZB)

27 April 2023; 19:00	**Azerbaijan**	**17–35**	**Nigeria**	Palace of Culture and Sports, Varna; Attendance: 44; Referees: Linster, Rauchs (LUX)
27 April 2023; 19:00	Nazaraliyev 4	(7–18)	F. Yusuf 13	Palace of Culture and Sports, Varna; Attendance: 44; Referees: Linster, Rauchs (LUX)
27 April 2023; 19:00	2× (suspension)	Report	1× (suspension)	Palace of Culture and Sports, Varna; Attendance: 44; Referees: Linster, Rauchs (LUX)

== Knockout stage ==
=== Bracket ===
Semi-finals
29 April
India	37
**Cyprus**	**42**
29 April
**Cuba**	**36**
Bulgaria	29

Final
30 April
Cyprus	18
**Cuba**	**28**
Third place
30 April
India	18
**Bulgaria**	**47**

Fifth place bracket

5–8th place semifinals
29 April
Andorra	19
**Australia**	**32**
29 April
**Great Britain**	**30**
Nigeria	20

Fifth place game
30 April
Australia	22
**Great Britain**	**34**
Seventh place game
30 April
Andorra	14
**Nigeria**	**36**

Ninth place bracket

9–12th place semifinals
29 April
Malta	21
**Moldova**	**25**
29 April
**Guatemala**	**28**
Azerbaijan	20

Ninth place game
30 April
**Moldova**	**21**
Guatemala	14
Eleventh place game
30 April
**Malta**	**31**
Azerbaijan	20

=== 9–12th place semifinals ===
29 April 2023; 09:15	**Malta**	**21–25**	**Moldova**	Palace of Culture and Sports, Varna; Attendance: 50; Referees: Al-Enezi, Al-Naseem (KUW)
29 April 2023; 09:15	Seifert 6	(9–12)	Martalog 10	Palace of Culture and Sports, Varna; Attendance: 50; Referees: Al-Enezi, Al-Naseem (KUW)
29 April 2023; 09:15	2× (suspension)	Report	1× (yellow card) 3× (suspension)	Palace of Culture and Sports, Varna; Attendance: 50; Referees: Al-Enezi, Al-Naseem (KUW)

29 April 2023; 11:30	**Guatemala**	**28–20**	**Azerbaijan**	Palace of Culture and Sports, Varna; Attendance: 50; Referees: Linster, Rauchs (LUX)
29 April 2023; 11:30	Estrada 8	(14–11)	Nazaraliyev 6	Palace of Culture and Sports, Varna; Attendance: 50; Referees: Linster, Rauchs (LUX)
29 April 2023; 11:30	3× (suspension)	Report	3× (suspension)	Palace of Culture and Sports, Varna; Attendance: 50; Referees: Linster, Rauchs (LUX)

=== 5–8th place semifinals ===
29 April 2023; 13:45	**Andorra**	**19–32**	**Australia**	Palace of Culture and Sports, Varna; Attendance: 65; Referees: Al-Wahibi, Al-Shahi (OMA)
29 April 2023; 13:45	Jiménez, Ruiz 5	(4–13)	Anderson 8	Palace of Culture and Sports, Varna; Attendance: 65; Referees: Al-Wahibi, Al-Shahi (OMA)
29 April 2023; 13:45	1× (yellow card) 1× (suspension)	Report	1× (suspension)	Palace of Culture and Sports, Varna; Attendance: 65; Referees: Al-Wahibi, Al-Shahi (OMA)

29 April 2023; 16:00	**Great Britain**	**30–20**	**Nigeria**	Palace of Culture and Sports, Varna; Attendance: 85; Referees: Araújo, Perdomo (URU)
29 April 2023; 16:00	Pereira 11	(14–11)	S. Yusuf 4	Palace of Culture and Sports, Varna; Attendance: 85; Referees: Araújo, Perdomo (URU)
29 April 2023; 16:00	1× (yellow card) 2× (suspension)	Report	3× (suspension)	Palace of Culture and Sports, Varna; Attendance: 85; Referees: Araújo, Perdomo (URU)

=== Semifinals ===
29 April 2023; 18:15	**Cuba**	**36–29**	**Bulgaria**	Palace of Culture and Sports, Varna; Attendance: 787; Referees: Mikelič, Paradina (CRO)
29 April 2023; 18:15	Rodríguez 9	(17–16)	Ivanov 8	Palace of Culture and Sports, Varna; Attendance: 787; Referees: Mikelič, Paradina (CRO)
29 April 2023; 18:15	1× (yellow card) 3× (suspension)	Report	2× (yellow card) 2× (suspension)	Palace of Culture and Sports, Varna; Attendance: 787; Referees: Mikelič, Paradina (CRO)

29 April 2023; 20:30	**India**	**37–42**	**Cyprus**	Palace of Culture and Sports, Varna; Attendance: 100; Referees: Ismoilov, Ismoilov (UZB)
29 April 2023; 20:30	S. Kumar 12	(23–21)	Charalambous 10	Palace of Culture and Sports, Varna; Attendance: 100; Referees: Ismoilov, Ismoilov (UZB)
29 April 2023; 20:30	5× (suspension) 1× (red card)	Report	1× (yellow card) 4× (suspension)	Palace of Culture and Sports, Varna; Attendance: 100; Referees: Ismoilov, Ismoilov (UZB)

=== Eleventh place game ===
30 April 2023; 09:15	**Malta**	**31–20**	**Azerbaijan**	Palace of Culture and Sports, Varna; Attendance: 50; Referees: Araújo, Perdomo (URU)
30 April 2023; 09:15	three players 5	(15–9)	J. Ismayilov 5	Palace of Culture and Sports, Varna; Attendance: 50; Referees: Araújo, Perdomo (URU)
30 April 2023; 09:15	2× (suspension)	Report	1× (yellow card) 2× (suspension)	Palace of Culture and Sports, Varna; Attendance: 50; Referees: Araújo, Perdomo (URU)

=== Ninth place game ===
30 April 2023; 11:30	**Moldova**	**21–14**	**Guatemala**	Palace of Culture and Sports, Varna; Attendance: 66; Referees: Mikelič, Paradina (CRO)
30 April 2023; 11:30	Sipulin 8	(8–5)	Estrada 5	Palace of Culture and Sports, Varna; Attendance: 66; Referees: Mikelič, Paradina (CRO)
30 April 2023; 11:30	1× (yellow card) 3× (suspension)	Report	1× (yellow card) 3× (suspension) 1× (red card)	Palace of Culture and Sports, Varna; Attendance: 66; Referees: Mikelič, Paradina (CRO)

=== Seventh place game ===
30 April 2023; 13:45	**Andorra**	**14–36**	**Nigeria**	Palace of Culture and Sports, Varna; Attendance: 74; Referees: Ismoilov, Ismoilov (UZB)
30 April 2023; 13:45	Ros 4	(6–17)	Salami 9	Palace of Culture and Sports, Varna; Attendance: 74; Referees: Ismoilov, Ismoilov (UZB)
30 April 2023; 13:45	3× (suspension)	Report	1× (suspension) 1× (red card)	Palace of Culture and Sports, Varna; Attendance: 74; Referees: Ismoilov, Ismoilov (UZB)

=== Fifth place game ===
30 April 2023; 16:00	**Australia**	**22–34**	**Great Britain**	Palace of Culture and Sports, Varna; Attendance: 50; Referees: Bozhinovski, Nachevski (MKD)
30 April 2023; 16:00	three players 4	(10–17)	Pereira 11	Palace of Culture and Sports, Varna; Attendance: 50; Referees: Bozhinovski, Nachevski (MKD)
30 April 2023; 16:00	4× (suspension)	Report	2× (suspension)	Palace of Culture and Sports, Varna; Attendance: 50; Referees: Bozhinovski, Nachevski (MKD)

=== Third place game ===
30 April 2023; 18:15	**India**	**18–47**	**Bulgaria**	Palace of Culture and Sports, Varna; Attendance: 514; Referees: Al-Wahibi, Al-Shahi (OMA)
30 April 2023; 18:15	Sahil 5	(7–25)	Sv. Dimitrov 11	Palace of Culture and Sports, Varna; Attendance: 514; Referees: Al-Wahibi, Al-Shahi (OMA)
30 April 2023; 18:15		Report		Palace of Culture and Sports, Varna; Attendance: 514; Referees: Al-Wahibi, Al-Shahi (OMA)

=== Final ===
30 April 2023; 20:30	**Cyprus**	**18–28**	**Cuba**	Palace of Culture and Sports, Varna; Attendance: 258; Referees: Doychinov, Goretsov (BUL)
30 April 2023; 20:30	Tartios 5	(9–14)	Almeida 8	Palace of Culture and Sports, Varna; Attendance: 258; Referees: Doychinov, Goretsov (BUL)
30 April 2023; 20:30	1× (suspension)	Report	2× (suspension)	Palace of Culture and Sports, Varna; Attendance: 258; Referees: Doychinov, Goretsov (BUL)

== Final ranking ==
The three best European teams advance to the EURO 2026 Qualification Relegation Round, except Great Britain, which already qualified as Winner of Euro 2026 Qualification Phase 1.

Rank	Team
1st place, gold medalist(s)	Cuba
2nd place, silver medalist(s)	Cyprus
3rd place, bronze medalist(s)	Bulgaria
4	India
5	Great Britain
6	Australia
7	Nigeria
8	Andorra
9	Moldova
10	Guatemala
11	Malta
12	Azerbaijan

Team advanced to the Relegation Round of qualification for EURO 2026
Team already qualified to the Relegation Round of qualification for EURO 2026 (As winner of Euro 2026 Qualification Phase 1)

== All-Star Team ==
The all-star team and awards was announced on 30 April 2023.

Position	Player
Goalkeeper	(United Kingdom) Craig McClelland
Right wing	(Cyprus) Georgios Kritikos
Right back	(United Kingdom) Sebastian Edgar
Centre back	(Cyprus) Alexandros Charalambous
Left back	(Bulgaria) Mihael Ivanov
Left wing	(India) Sumit
Pivot	(Australia) Karl Warrener
Best defender	(Cuba) Lidier Martínez
Most valuable player	(Cuba) Hanser Rodríguez

== Statistics ==
=== Top goalscorers ===
Rank	Name	Goals	Shots	%
1	(United Kingdom) Francisco Pereira	34	55	62
2	(Cyprus) Alexandros Charalambous	32	48	67
3	(Bulgaria) Svetlin Dimitrov	29	40	73
4	(Nigeria) Faruk Yusuf	28	44	64
5	(Andorra) Unai Ruiz	27	76	36
5	(Cuba) Hanser Rodríguez	27	34	79
7	(Malta) Neil Gruppetta	26	55	47
8	(Bulgaria) Mihael Ivanov	25	35	71
8	(India) Ankit	25	41	61
8	(Moldova) Vlad Martalog	25	41	61

Source: IHF

=== Top goalkeepers ===
Rank	Name	%	Saves	Shots
1	(United Kingdom) Craig McClelland	43	44	102
2	(Cuba) Magnol Suárez	42	43	103
3	(Australia) Bjoern McCourt	39	46	119
4	(Bulgaria) Stefan Dimitrov	37	11	30
4	(Moldova) Serghei Buglis	37	13	35
6	(India) Tripathi Amar	36	5	14
6	(Malta) Clinton Mifsud	36	50	140
8	(Nigeria) Babatunde Adamolugbe	35	45	129
9	(Azerbaijan) Raul Muradov	33	12	36
9	(Bulgaria) Nikolay Petrov	33	36	108
9	(Moldova) Andrei Mitrofan	33	35	105

Source: IHF
