= Handball at the 2009 Mediterranean Games – Men's tournament =

Men's handball at the 2009 Mediterranean Games
Tournament details
- Host country: Italy
- Venue(s): 1 (in 1 host city)
- Dates: 27 June – 5 July
- Teams: 9 (from 2 confederations)

Final positions
- Champions: Serbia (1st title)
- Runners-up: France
- Third place: Tunisia
- Fourth place: Turkey

Tournament statistics
- Matches played: 22
- Goals scored: 1,303 (59.23 per match)
- Top scorer(s): (Turkey) Ramazan Döne (49 goals)

The men's handball tournament at the 2009 Mediterranean Games was held from 27 June to 5 July in Pescara.

== Preliminary round ==
All times are local (UTC+2).

=== Group A ===
Pos	Team	Pld	W	D	L	GF	GA	GD	Pts	Qualification
1	France	3	2	1	0	120	62	+58	5	Semifinals
2	Serbia	3	2	0	1	123	68	+55	4	Semifinals
3	Algeria	3	1	1	1	108	66	+42	3	Fifth place game
4	Albania	3	0	0	3	17	172	−155	0	Seventh place game

Source: Pescara 2009
Rules for classification: 1) Points; 2) Head-to-head points; 3) Head-to-head goal difference; 4) Head-to-head goals scored; 5) Goal difference; 6) Goals scored; 7) Draw.

27 June 2009; 14:00	Albania	5–48	Algeria	Giovanni Paolo II Sports Hall, Pescara; Referees: Stojković, Nikolić (SRB)
27 June 2009; 14:00	Nasi 2	(3–29)	Zouaoui 9	Giovanni Paolo II Sports Hall, Pescara; Referees: Stojković, Nikolić (SRB)
27 June 2009; 14:00	4× (yellow card)	Report	3× (yellow card)	Giovanni Paolo II Sports Hall, Pescara; Referees: Stojković, Nikolić (SRB)

27 June 2009; 18:00	Serbia	27–31	France	Giovanni Paolo II Sports Hall, Pescara; Referees: Gubica, Milošević (CRO)
27 June 2009; 18:00	three players 5	(14–16)	Caucheteux 7	Giovanni Paolo II Sports Hall, Pescara; Referees: Gubica, Milošević (CRO)
27 June 2009; 18:00	3× (yellow card) 3× (suspension)	Report	4× (yellow card) 5× (suspension)	Giovanni Paolo II Sports Hall, Pescara; Referees: Gubica, Milošević (CRO)

29 June 2009; 14:00	France	58–4	Albania	Giovanni Paolo II Sports Hall, Pescara; Referees: Beji, Farah (TUN)
29 June 2009; 14:00	Arive 8	(29–2)	four players 1	Giovanni Paolo II Sports Hall, Pescara; Referees: Beji, Farah (TUN)
29 June 2009; 14:00	2× (yellow card)	Report	3× (yellow card) 1× (suspension) 1× (red card)	Giovanni Paolo II Sports Hall, Pescara; Referees: Beji, Farah (TUN)

29 June 2009; 18:00	Algeria	29–30	Serbia	Giovanni Paolo II Sports Hall, Pescara; Referees: Tzaferopoulos, Bethmann (GRE)
29 June 2009; 18:00	Chehbour 10	(18–13)	Nenadić 7	Giovanni Paolo II Sports Hall, Pescara; Referees: Tzaferopoulos, Bethmann (GRE)
29 June 2009; 18:00	4× (yellow card) 2× (suspension)	Report	5× (yellow card) 8× (suspension) 2× (red card)	Giovanni Paolo II Sports Hall, Pescara; Referees: Tzaferopoulos, Bethmann (GRE)

1 July 2009; 14:00	Albania	8–66	Serbia	Giovanni Paolo II Sports Hall, Pescara; Referees: Tzaferopoulos, Bethmann (GRE)
1 July 2009; 14:00	three players 2	(1–32)	Tubić 12	Giovanni Paolo II Sports Hall, Pescara; Referees: Tzaferopoulos, Bethmann (GRE)
1 July 2009; 14:00	1× (yellow card) 7× (suspension)	Report	2× (yellow card)	Giovanni Paolo II Sports Hall, Pescara; Referees: Tzaferopoulos, Bethmann (GRE)

1 July 2009; 18:00	Algeria	31–31	France	Giovanni Paolo II Sports Hall, Pescara; Referees: Gubica, Milošević (CRO)
1 July 2009; 18:00	Soudani 7	(14–16)	Accambray 10	Giovanni Paolo II Sports Hall, Pescara; Referees: Gubica, Milošević (CRO)
1 July 2009; 18:00	4× (yellow card) 5× (suspension)	Report	3× (yellow card) 3× (suspension)	Giovanni Paolo II Sports Hall, Pescara; Referees: Gubica, Milošević (CRO)

=== Group B ===
Pos	Team	Pld	W	D	L	GF	GA	GD	Pts	Qualification
1	Turkey	4	3	0	1	119	105	+14	6 (Note: Turkey 32–28 Tunisia)	Semifinals
2	Tunisia	4	3	0	1	113	109	+4	6	Semifinals
3	Greece	4	2	0	2	113	114	−1	4	Fifth place game
4	Italy (H)	4	1	0	3	106	105	+1	2 (Note: Bosnia and Herzegovina 25–32 Italy)	Seventh place game
5	Bosnia and Herzegovina	4	1	0	3	105	123	−18	2	

Source: Pescara 2009
Rules for classification: 1) Points; 2) Head-to-head points; 3) Head-to-head goal difference; 4) Head-to-head goals scored; 5) Goal difference; 6) Goals scored; 7) Draw.
(H) Hosts
Notes:

27 June 2009; 16:00	Turkey	29–30	Bosnia and Herzegovina	Giovanni Paolo II Sports Hall, Pescara; Referees: Mondin, Cropanise (ITA)
27 June 2009; 16:00	Döne 8	(15–12)	Divković 7	Giovanni Paolo II Sports Hall, Pescara; Referees: Mondin, Cropanise (ITA)
27 June 2009; 16:00	3× (yellow card) 5× (suspension)	Report	3× (yellow card) 3× (suspension) 2× (red card)	Giovanni Paolo II Sports Hall, Pescara; Referees: Mondin, Cropanise (ITA)

27 June 2009; 20:00	Tunisia	33–28	Greece	Giovanni Paolo II Sports Hall, Pescara; Referees: Dentz, Reibel (FRA)
27 June 2009; 20:00	Lagha 6	(13–15)	Riganas 10	Giovanni Paolo II Sports Hall, Pescara; Referees: Dentz, Reibel (FRA)
27 June 2009; 20:00	2× (yellow card) 3× (suspension)	Report	4× (yellow card) 8× (suspension) 1× (red card)	Giovanni Paolo II Sports Hall, Pescara; Referees: Dentz, Reibel (FRA)

28 June 2009; 16:00	Bosnia and Herzegovina	24–26	Tunisia	Giovanni Paolo II Sports Hall, Pescara; Referees: Alperan, Scevola (ITA)
28 June 2009; 16:00	Divković 8	(12–15)	Saïed 6	Giovanni Paolo II Sports Hall, Pescara; Referees: Alperan, Scevola (ITA)
28 June 2009; 16:00	4× (yellow card) 6× (suspension) 1× (red card)	Report	4× (yellow card) 5× (suspension)	Giovanni Paolo II Sports Hall, Pescara; Referees: Alperan, Scevola (ITA)

28 June 2009; 18:00	Italy	24–28	Turkey	Giovanni Paolo II Sports Hall, Pescara; Referees: Repenšek, Požežnik (SLO)
28 June 2009; 18:00	Di Maggio 5	(10–15)	Yalçıner 9	Giovanni Paolo II Sports Hall, Pescara; Referees: Repenšek, Požežnik (SLO)
28 June 2009; 18:00	3× (yellow card) 5× (suspension)	Report	4× (yellow card) 5× (suspension)	Giovanni Paolo II Sports Hall, Pescara; Referees: Repenšek, Požežnik (SLO)

29 June 2009; 16:00	Tunisia	26–25	Italy	Giovanni Paolo II Sports Hall, Pescara; Referees: Repenšek, Požežnik (SLO)
29 June 2009; 16:00	Ayed 6	(12–13)	Radovcic 5	Giovanni Paolo II Sports Hall, Pescara; Referees: Repenšek, Požežnik (SLO)
29 June 2009; 16:00	3× (yellow card) 4× (suspension)	Report	4× (yellow card) 5× (suspension)	Giovanni Paolo II Sports Hall, Pescara; Referees: Repenšek, Požežnik (SLO)

29 June 2009; 20:00	Greece	36–26	Bosnia and Herzegovina	Giovanni Paolo II Sports Hall, Pescara; Referees: Gubica, Milošević (CRO)
29 June 2009; 20:00	Riganas 11	(13–12)	Buljugija 9	Giovanni Paolo II Sports Hall, Pescara; Referees: Gubica, Milošević (CRO)
29 June 2009; 20:00	3× (yellow card) 4× (suspension)	Report	3× (yellow card) 5× (suspension)	Giovanni Paolo II Sports Hall, Pescara; Referees: Gubica, Milošević (CRO)

30 June 2009; 16:00	Italy	25–26	Greece	Giovanni Paolo II Sports Hall, Pescara; Referees: Stojković, Nikolić (SRB)
30 June 2009; 16:00	Tarafino, Tokić 5	(16–14)	Mastorogiannis, Tzoufras 4	Giovanni Paolo II Sports Hall, Pescara; Referees: Stojković, Nikolić (SRB)
30 June 2009; 16:00	3× (yellow card) 8× (suspension) 1× (red card)	Report	4× (yellow card) 6× (suspension) 1× (red card)	Giovanni Paolo II Sports Hall, Pescara; Referees: Stojković, Nikolić (SRB)

30 June 2009; 18:00	Turkey	32–28	Tunisia	Giovanni Paolo II Sports Hall, Pescara; Referees: Dentz, Reibel (FRA)
30 June 2009; 18:00	Döne 8	(14–12)	Mrabet 8	Giovanni Paolo II Sports Hall, Pescara; Referees: Dentz, Reibel (FRA)
30 June 2009; 18:00	3× (yellow card) 8× (suspension) 1× (red card)	Report	3× (yellow card) 3× (suspension)	Giovanni Paolo II Sports Hall, Pescara; Referees: Dentz, Reibel (FRA)

1 July 2009; 16:00	Greece	23–30	Turkey	Giovanni Paolo II Sports Hall, Pescara; Referees: Repenšek, Požežnik (SLO)
1 July 2009; 16:00	Riganas, Tsatso 4	(11–14)	Yalçıner 9	Giovanni Paolo II Sports Hall, Pescara; Referees: Repenšek, Požežnik (SLO)
1 July 2009; 16:00	4× (yellow card) 5× (suspension)	Report	3× (yellow card) 12× (suspension)	Giovanni Paolo II Sports Hall, Pescara; Referees: Repenšek, Požežnik (SLO)

1 July 2009; 20:00	Bosnia and Herzegovina	25–32	Italy	Giovanni Paolo II Sports Hall, Pescara; Referees: Beji, Farah (TUN)
1 July 2009; 20:00	Buljugija 8	(12–16)	Tumbarello 6	Giovanni Paolo II Sports Hall, Pescara; Referees: Beji, Farah (TUN)
1 July 2009; 20:00	4× (yellow card) 7× (suspension) 1× (red card)	Report	4× (yellow card) 6× (suspension)	Giovanni Paolo II Sports Hall, Pescara; Referees: Beji, Farah (TUN)

== Playoffs ==
=== Bracket ===
Semifinals
3 July
France	28
Tunisia	25
3 July
Serbia (OT)	43
Turkey	41

Gold medal
5 July
France	31
Serbia	35
Bronze medal
5 July
Tunisia	28
Turkey	24

=== Semifinals ===
3 July 2009; 16:30	France	28–25	Tunisia	Giovanni Paolo II Sports Hall, Pescara; Referees: Gubica, Milošević (CRO)
3 July 2009; 16:30	Cismondo 5	(18–10)	Saïed 6	Giovanni Paolo II Sports Hall, Pescara; Referees: Gubica, Milošević (CRO)
3 July 2009; 16:30	4× (yellow card) 5× (suspension) 1× (red card)	Report	3× (yellow card) 3× (suspension)	Giovanni Paolo II Sports Hall, Pescara; Referees: Gubica, Milošević (CRO)

3 July 2009
19:00
Serbia
43–41 (ET)
Turkey
Giovanni Paolo II Sports Hall, Pescara

(16–13)

FT: 33–33 ET: 4–4, 6–4

=== Seventh place game ===
2 July 2009; 17:00	Albania	14–62	Italy	Giovanni Paolo II Sports Hall, Pescara
2 July 2009; 17:00		(5–30)		Giovanni Paolo II Sports Hall, Pescara

=== Fifth place game ===
2 July 2009; 19:30	Algeria	27–21	Greece	Giovanni Paolo II Sports Hall, Pescara
2 July 2009; 19:30		(12–8)		Giovanni Paolo II Sports Hall, Pescara

=== Bronze medal game ===
5 July 2009; 14:30	Tunisia	28–24	Turkey	Giovanni Paolo II Sports Hall, Pescara; Referees: Mondin, Cropanise (ITA)
5 July 2009; 14:30	Gharbi 7	(16–11)	Döne 9	Giovanni Paolo II Sports Hall, Pescara; Referees: Mondin, Cropanise (ITA)
5 July 2009; 14:30	3× (yellow card) 4× (suspension) 1× (red card)	Report	3× (yellow card) 5× (suspension) 1× (red card)	Giovanni Paolo II Sports Hall, Pescara; Referees: Mondin, Cropanise (ITA)

=== Gold medal game ===
5 July 2009; 17:00	France	31–35	Serbia	Giovanni Paolo II Sports Hall, Pescara; Referees: Repenšek, Požežnik (SLO)
5 July 2009; 17:00	Anić 9	(14–14)	Rnić, Stojanović 7	Giovanni Paolo II Sports Hall, Pescara; Referees: Repenšek, Požežnik (SLO)
5 July 2009; 17:00	4× (yellow card) 5× (suspension)	Report	3× (yellow card) 2× (suspension)	Giovanni Paolo II Sports Hall, Pescara; Referees: Repenšek, Požežnik (SLO)

== Final standings ==
Rank	Team
1st place, gold medalist(s)	Serbia
2nd place, silver medalist(s)	France
3rd place, bronze medalist(s)	Tunisia
4	Turkey
5	Algeria
6	Greece
7	Italy
8	Albania
9	Bosnia and Herzegovina
