= Ireland men's national handball team =

Ireland

Information
- Association: Irish Olympic Handball Association
- Coach: Roman Abramenko

Colours
1st	2nd
- Last updated on Unknown.

The Ireland national handball team is controlled by the Irish Olympic Handball Association (IOHA) and represents Ireland in international handball matches.

== History ==
=== Liverpool Airport 4-Nations Championship 1984 ===
In 1984 the team played a 4-Nations Championship in Liverpool. They lost the first game against England 1 to 12, the game against Scotland was lost by 5 to 20 and the final game against Wales they lost 14 to 16. They finished last place in the tournament.

=== EHF Challenge Trophy 2009 ===
The Irish Men's team finished in 3rd place of the group G2 in the EHF Challenge Cup trophy in Malta. The 3rd place finish was the best result an Irish team achieved in the prior 10 years of the competition.

Ireland played the hosts Malta in the first match at the University Sports Hall. In front of a home Maltese crowd, the Irish were down at half time by 20:7. In the second half, Ireland ended up being beaten by a 36 to 20 score line.

The second game of the tournament for the Irish saw them taking on the eventual winners Finland. The Finns won by 38 goals to 19.

Ireland's third game was against Scotland. The Scottish team, which had 4 players from the Great Britain Olympic Program, led 15:14 at halftime. However, the Irish ultimately won by 35:29.

In addition to winning the bronze medal at the tournament, middle-back player Oisin O'Brannagain was voted onto the tournament's all-star team.

=== EHF Challenge Trophy 2011 ===
The 2011 edition of the EHF Challenge Trophy took place at the University of Limerick. The first game with eventual champions, the Faroe Islands, ended in a 30–20 defeat. In the second match, Georgia defeated Ireland by 37–21. The final game was against England and, the game ended 29–24 to England.

=== 2012 ===
The team competed in the 2014 European qualifiers for the first time in June 2012. All three matches, however, resulted in significant losses.

== IHF Emerging Nations Championship record ==
- 2015 – 13th place
- 2017 – 12th place
- 2019 – 11th place
