= Svetlin =

Svetlin (Bulgarian: Светлин) is a given name and a surname. It may refer to:

== Given name ==
- Svetlin Dimitrov (born 1990), Bulgarian handball player
- Svetlin Roussev (born 1976), Bulgarian violinist
- Svetlin Rusev (1933–2018), Bulgarian artist
- Svetlin Simeonov (born 1975), Bulgarian footballer

== Surname ==
- Tamar Svetlin (born 2001), Slovenian footballer
