= Sobhi Saïed =

Tunisian handball player (born 1982)

Personal information
- Nationality: Tunisian
- Born: 26 September 1982 (age 44) Moknine, Tunisia
- Height: 1.78 m (5 ft 10 in)

Sport
- Sport: Handball
- Position: Centre back
- Current club: Al-Gharafa
National team
Years	Team	Apps	(Gls)
–	Tunisia	156	(311)
Medal record
Mediterranean Games
Bronze medal – third place	2009 Pescara	Team

Sobhi Saïed (born 26 September 1982) is a Tunisian handball player for Al-Gharafa and the Tunisian national team.

He participated on the Tunisia national team at the 2016 Summer Olympics in Rio de Janeiro, in the men's handball tournament.
