= Armenia men's national handball team =

Armenia

Information
- Association: Armenian Handball Federation
- Coach: Ararat Barseghyan

Colours
1st	2nd
- Last updated on Unknown.

The Armenia national handball team is the national handball team of Armenia, representing the country in international matches. It is managed by the Armenian Handball Federation, which itself is a member of the International Handball Federation.

== IHF Emerging Nations Championship record ==
- 2015 – 16th place
- 2017 – 16th place

== See also ==
- Sport in Armenia
