= 2019 IHF Emerging Nations Championship =

3rd IHF Emerging Nations Championship 2019

Tournament details
- Host country: Georgia
- Venue: 1 (in 1 host city)
- Dates: 8–16 June
- Teams: 12 (from 5 confederations)

Final positions
- Champions: Georgia (1st title)
- Runners-up: Cuba
- Third place: Bulgaria
- Fourth place: Great Britain

Tournament statistics
- Matches played: 42
- Goals scored: 2,551 (60.74 per match)
- Attendance: 4,556 (108 per match)
- Top scorers: (United Kingdom) Sebastien Edgar (66 goals)

Awards
- Best player: (Georgia (country)) Giorgi Tskhovrebadze

The 2019 IHF Emerging Nations Handball Championship was the third edition of the IHF Emerging Nations Championship held in Georgia under the aegis of International Handball Federation from 7 to 16 June 2019.

Georgia defeated Cuba in the final to win their first title and earned the right to compete at the Relegation Round of 2022 European Championship qualification.

A total of twelve countries participated in the tournament.

== Venues ==
The championship were played in Tbilisi, Georgia.

Tbilisi	2019 IHF Emerging Nations Championship is located in Georgia
Tbilisi Sports Palace; Capacity: 9,700	2019 IHF Emerging Nations Championship is located in Georgia

== Participating teams ==
Unlike previous edition, Europe was represented only by the teams who competed at the first phase of 2022 European Championship qualification and failed to advance to the Relegation Round. That implied Faroe Islands not to defend their title at this tournament.

Country	Previous appearances in championship
Azerbaijan (3rd placed team of EURO 2022 Qualification Phase 1 Group B)	1 (2017)
Bulgaria (2nd placed team of EURO 2022 Qualification Phase 1 Group A)	2 (2015, 2017)
China	2 (2015, 2017)
Colombia (Winner of 2018 South and Central American Emerging Nations Championship)	0 (debut)
Cuba (Winner of 2019 NorCa Emerging Nations Championship)	0 (debut)
Georgia (2nd placed team of EURO 2022 Qualification Phase 1 Group B)	1 (2017)
Great Britain (3rd placed team of EURO 2022 Qualification Phase 1 Group A)	2 (2015, 2017)
India	0 (debut)
Ireland (4th placed team of EURO 2022 Qualification Phase 1 Group A)	2 (2015, 2017)
Malta (4th placed team of EURO 2022 Qualification Phase 1 Group B)	2 (2015, 2017)
Nigeria	0 (debut)
United States (Wildcard)	0 (debut)

^{1} Bold indicates champion for that year. Italics indicates host.

== Draw ==
The draw was held on 26 April 2019. Georgia had the right to choose their group after the draw was completed.

=== Seeding ===
Pot 1	Pot 2	Pot 3	Pot 4	Pot 5	Pot 6
Bulgaria; China	Georgia; Azerbaijan	Great Britain; Ireland	Colombia; Malta	Cuba; United States	India; Nigeria

== Preliminary round ==
All times are local (UTC+4).

=== Group A ===
Pos	Team	Pld	W	D	L	GF	GA	GD	Pts	Qualification
1	Cuba	5	5	0	0	167	130	+37	10	Semifinals
2	Great Britain	5	4	0	1	156	144	+12	8	Semifinals
3	China	5	3	0	2	150	138	+12	6	5–8th place semifinals
4	Colombia	5	2	0	3	148	152	−4	4	5–8th place semifinals
5	Azerbaijan	5	1	0	4	162	166	−4	2	9–12th place semifinals
6	India	5	0	0	5	151	204	−53	0	9–12th place semifinals

Source: IHF
Rules for classification: 1) points; 2) head-to-head points; 3) head-to-head goal difference; 4) head-to-head number of goals scored; 5) goal difference.

8 June 2019; 10:00	Colombia	25–28	China	Tbilisi Sports Palace, Tbilisi; Attendance: 150; Referees: Ershov, Pavliukov (RUS)
8 June 2019; 10:00	Restrepo 10	(10–10)	Li Z. 8	Tbilisi Sports Palace, Tbilisi; Attendance: 150; Referees: Ershov, Pavliukov (RUS)
8 June 2019; 10:00	2× (yellow card) 4× (suspension)	Report	2× (yellow card) 9× (suspension)	Tbilisi Sports Palace, Tbilisi; Attendance: 150; Referees: Ershov, Pavliukov (RUS)

8 June 2019; 14:00	India	29–45	Azerbaijan	Tbilisi Sports Palace, Tbilisi; Attendance: 98; Referees: Da Silva, Magalhães (BRA)
8 June 2019; 14:00	Nain 8	(15–20)	Nazaraliyev 10	Tbilisi Sports Palace, Tbilisi; Attendance: 98; Referees: Da Silva, Magalhães (BRA)
8 June 2019; 14:00	3× (yellow card) 5× (suspension)	Report	7× (suspension) 1× (red card)	Tbilisi Sports Palace, Tbilisi; Attendance: 98; Referees: Da Silva, Magalhães (BRA)

8 June 2019; 16:00	Cuba	35–27	Great Britain	Tbilisi Sports Palace, Tbilisi; Attendance: 50; Referees: Bíró, Kiss (HUN)
8 June 2019; 16:00	Toledano 10	(17–9)	Green 8	Tbilisi Sports Palace, Tbilisi; Attendance: 50; Referees: Bíró, Kiss (HUN)
8 June 2019; 16:00	4× (suspension)	Report	1× (yellow card) 7× (suspension)	Tbilisi Sports Palace, Tbilisi; Attendance: 50; Referees: Bíró, Kiss (HUN)

9 June 2019; 10:00	Colombia	35–30	Azerbaijan	Tbilisi Sports Palace, Tbilisi; Attendance: 74; Referees: Vranes, Wenninger (AUT)
9 June 2019; 10:00	Restrepo 12	(17–15)	Muradov, Nazaraliyev 8	Tbilisi Sports Palace, Tbilisi; Attendance: 74; Referees: Vranes, Wenninger (AUT)
9 June 2019; 10:00	1× (yellow card) 10× (suspension) 2× (red card)	Report	1× (yellow card) 5× (suspension) 2× (red card)	Tbilisi Sports Palace, Tbilisi; Attendance: 74; Referees: Vranes, Wenninger (AUT)

9 June 2019; 12:00	China	24–30	Cuba	Tbilisi Sports Palace, Tbilisi; Attendance: 50; Referees: Hannes, Hannes (GER)
9 June 2019; 12:00	Li Z. 9	(10–13)	Toledano 7	Tbilisi Sports Palace, Tbilisi; Attendance: 50; Referees: Hannes, Hannes (GER)
9 June 2019; 12:00	1× (yellow card) 7× (suspension)	Report	1× (yellow card) 7× (suspension) 2× (red card)	Tbilisi Sports Palace, Tbilisi; Attendance: 50; Referees: Hannes, Hannes (GER)

9 June 2019; 14:00	Great Britain	38–28	India	Tbilisi Sports Palace, Tbilisi; Attendance: 50; Referees: Mitrović, Kažanegra (MNE)
9 June 2019; 14:00	Edgar 14	(16–13)	D. Singh 9	Tbilisi Sports Palace, Tbilisi; Attendance: 50; Referees: Mitrović, Kažanegra (MNE)
9 June 2019; 14:00	2× (yellow card) 5× (suspension)	Report	2× (suspension)	Tbilisi Sports Palace, Tbilisi; Attendance: 50; Referees: Mitrović, Kažanegra (MNE)

10 June 2019; 10:00	Azerbaijan	35–36	Great Britain	Tbilisi Sports Palace, Tbilisi; Attendance: 50; Referees: Carmaux, Mursch (FRA)
10 June 2019; 10:00	Nazaraliyev, Salimov 8	(15–20)	Edgar 11	Tbilisi Sports Palace, Tbilisi; Attendance: 50; Referees: Carmaux, Mursch (FRA)
10 June 2019; 10:00	2× (yellow card) 7× (suspension)	Report	1× (yellow card) 6× (suspension)	Tbilisi Sports Palace, Tbilisi; Attendance: 50; Referees: Carmaux, Mursch (FRA)

10 June 2019; 12:00	Colombia	24–31	Cuba	Tbilisi Sports Palace, Tbilisi; Attendance: 50; Referees: Monitillo, Simone (ITA)
10 June 2019; 12:00	Romero 6	(10–12)	A. García 8	Tbilisi Sports Palace, Tbilisi; Attendance: 50; Referees: Monitillo, Simone (ITA)
10 June 2019; 12:00	1× (yellow card) 2× (suspension)	Report	2× (yellow card) 6× (suspension)	Tbilisi Sports Palace, Tbilisi; Attendance: 50; Referees: Monitillo, Simone (ITA)

10 June 2019; 14:00	India	29–40	China	Tbilisi Sports Palace, Tbilisi; Attendance: 15; Referees: El-Beltagy, Nasser (EGY)
10 June 2019; 14:00	Nain 9	(15–15)	Huang 8	Tbilisi Sports Palace, Tbilisi; Attendance: 15; Referees: El-Beltagy, Nasser (EGY)
10 June 2019; 14:00	2× (yellow card) 3× (suspension)	Report	1× (yellow card) 4× (suspension)	Tbilisi Sports Palace, Tbilisi; Attendance: 15; Referees: El-Beltagy, Nasser (EGY)

12 June 2019; 10:00	Azerbaijan	26–31	Cuba	Tbilisi Sports Palace, Tbilisi; Attendance: 45; Referees: El-Beltagy, Nasser (EGY)
12 June 2019; 10:00	Muradov 9	(13–16)	D. García 5	Tbilisi Sports Palace, Tbilisi; Attendance: 45; Referees: El-Beltagy, Nasser (EGY)
12 June 2019; 10:00	2× (yellow card) 4× (suspension) 1× (red card)	Report	1× (yellow card) 8× (suspension)	Tbilisi Sports Palace, Tbilisi; Attendance: 45; Referees: El-Beltagy, Nasser (EGY)

12 June 2019; 12:00	Great Britain	28–23	China	Tbilisi Sports Palace, Tbilisi; Attendance: 50; Referees: Hermann, Madsen (DEN)
12 June 2019; 12:00	Edgar 12	(12–12)	Li S. 6	Tbilisi Sports Palace, Tbilisi; Attendance: 50; Referees: Hermann, Madsen (DEN)
12 June 2019; 12:00	3× (suspension)	Report	1× (yellow card) 7× (suspension) 1× (red card)	Tbilisi Sports Palace, Tbilisi; Attendance: 50; Referees: Hermann, Madsen (DEN)

12 June 2019; 14:00	Colombia	41–36	India	Tbilisi Sports Palace, Tbilisi; Attendance: 79; Referees: Ershov, Pavliukov (RUS)
12 June 2019; 14:00	Mayo 9	(22–18)	D. Singh 13	Tbilisi Sports Palace, Tbilisi; Attendance: 79; Referees: Ershov, Pavliukov (RUS)
12 June 2019; 14:00	2× (yellow card) 3× (suspension)	Report	1× (yellow card) 7× (suspension)	Tbilisi Sports Palace, Tbilisi; Attendance: 79; Referees: Ershov, Pavliukov (RUS)

13 June 2019; 10:00	China	35–26	Azerbaijan	Tbilisi Sports Palace, Tbilisi; Attendance: 50; Referees: Magalhães, Da Silva (BRA)
13 June 2019; 10:00	three players 7	(17–12)	Nazaraliyev 10	Tbilisi Sports Palace, Tbilisi; Attendance: 50; Referees: Magalhães, Da Silva (BRA)
13 June 2019; 10:00	2× (yellow card) 5× (suspension)	Report	4× (yellow card) 4× (suspension)	Tbilisi Sports Palace, Tbilisi; Attendance: 50; Referees: Magalhães, Da Silva (BRA)

13 June 2019; 12:00	Great Britain	27–23	Colombia	Tbilisi Sports Palace, Tbilisi; Attendance: 50; Referees: Hannes, Hannes (GER)
13 June 2019; 12:00	Edgar 10	(13–8)	Restrepo 6	Tbilisi Sports Palace, Tbilisi; Attendance: 50; Referees: Hannes, Hannes (GER)
13 June 2019; 12:00	2× (yellow card) 2× (suspension)	Report	4× (suspension)	Tbilisi Sports Palace, Tbilisi; Attendance: 50; Referees: Hannes, Hannes (GER)

13 June 2019; 14:00	Cuba	40–29	India	Tbilisi Sports Palace, Tbilisi; Attendance: 68; Referees: Kažanegra, Mitrović (SRB)
13 June 2019; 14:00	Lafortán 9	(19–12)	D. Singh 6	Tbilisi Sports Palace, Tbilisi; Attendance: 68; Referees: Kažanegra, Mitrović (SRB)
13 June 2019; 14:00	7× (suspension) 1× (red card)	Report	2× (suspension)	Tbilisi Sports Palace, Tbilisi; Attendance: 68; Referees: Kažanegra, Mitrović (SRB)

=== Group B ===
Pos	Team	Pld	W	D	L	GF	GA	GD	Pts	Qualification
1	Georgia (H)	5	5	0	0	166	85	+81	10	Semifinals
2	Bulgaria	5	4	0	1	159	124	+35	8	Semifinals
3	United States	5	3	0	2	176	132	+44	6	5–8th place semifinals
4	Nigeria	5	1	1	3	128	136	−8	3 (Note: Ireland 31–31 Nigeria)	5–8th place semifinals
5	Ireland	5	1	1	3	143	165	−22	3	9–12th place semifinals
6	Malta	5	0	0	5	72	202	−130	0	9–12th place semifinals

Source: IHF
Rules for classification: 1) points; 2) head-to-head points; 3) head-to-head goal difference; 4) head-to-head number of goals scored; 5) goal difference.
(H) Hosts
Notes:

8 June 2019; 12:00	Malta	13–38	Bulgaria	Tbilisi Sports Palace, Tbilisi; Attendance: 50; Referees: Carmaux, Mursch (FRA)
8 June 2019; 12:00	Harrison 6	(6–23)	Sv. Dimitrov 10	Tbilisi Sports Palace, Tbilisi; Attendance: 50; Referees: Carmaux, Mursch (FRA)
8 June 2019; 12:00	4× (suspension) 1× (red card)	Report	2× (suspension) 1× (red card)	Tbilisi Sports Palace, Tbilisi; Attendance: 50; Referees: Carmaux, Mursch (FRA)

8 June 2019; 18:30	Nigeria	14–27	Georgia	Tbilisi Sports Palace, Tbilisi; Attendance: 800; Referees: Hermann, Madsen (DEN)
8 June 2019; 18:30	Cole 4	(6–14)	Tskhovrebadze 6	Tbilisi Sports Palace, Tbilisi; Attendance: 800; Referees: Hermann, Madsen (DEN)
8 June 2019; 18:30	9× (suspension)	Report	1× (yellow card) 7× (suspension)	Tbilisi Sports Palace, Tbilisi; Attendance: 800; Referees: Hermann, Madsen (DEN)

8 June 2019; 20:30	United States	37–32	Ireland	Tbilisi Sports Palace, Tbilisi; Attendance: 75; Referees: Monitillo, Simone (ITA)
8 June 2019; 20:30	Fofana 13	(21–17)	Grace 13	Tbilisi Sports Palace, Tbilisi; Attendance: 75; Referees: Monitillo, Simone (ITA)
8 June 2019; 20:30	2× (yellow card) 1× (suspension)	Report	1× (yellow card) 6× (suspension)	Tbilisi Sports Palace, Tbilisi; Attendance: 75; Referees: Monitillo, Simone (ITA)

9 June 2019; 16:00	Bulgaria	38–35	United States	Tbilisi Sports Palace, Tbilisi; Attendance: 87; Referees: Jovandić, Sekulić (SRB)
9 June 2019; 16:00	Vasilev 11	(16–17)	Inahara 10	Tbilisi Sports Palace, Tbilisi; Attendance: 87; Referees: Jovandić, Sekulić (SRB)
9 June 2019; 16:00	1× (yellow card) 7× (suspension)	Report	8× (suspension) 1× (red card)	Tbilisi Sports Palace, Tbilisi; Attendance: 87; Referees: Jovandić, Sekulić (SRB)

9 June 2019; 18:00	Malta	13–39	Georgia	Tbilisi Sports Palace, Tbilisi; Attendance: 100; Referees: El-Beltagy, Nasser (EGY)
9 June 2019; 18:00	Fenech 4	(7–16)	Dikhaminjia 8	Tbilisi Sports Palace, Tbilisi; Attendance: 100; Referees: El-Beltagy, Nasser (EGY)
9 June 2019; 18:00	3× (suspension) 1× (red card)	Report	1× (yellow card) 7× (suspension) 1× (red card)	Tbilisi Sports Palace, Tbilisi; Attendance: 100; Referees: El-Beltagy, Nasser (EGY)

9 June 2019; 20:00	Ireland	31–31	Nigeria	Tbilisi Sports Palace, Tbilisi; Attendance: 50; Referees: Da Silva, Magalhães (BRA)
9 June 2019; 20:00	three players 7	(14–16)	Anih 12	Tbilisi Sports Palace, Tbilisi; Attendance: 50; Referees: Da Silva, Magalhães (BRA)
9 June 2019; 20:00	1× (yellow card) 2× (suspension)	Report	2× (yellow card) 2× (suspension)	Tbilisi Sports Palace, Tbilisi; Attendance: 50; Referees: Da Silva, Magalhães (BRA)

10 June 2019; 16:00	United States	44–10	Malta	Tbilisi Sports Palace, Tbilisi; Attendance: 91; Referees: Mitrović, Kažanegra (MNE)
10 June 2019; 16:00	Reed 10	(24–8)	Harrison 5	Tbilisi Sports Palace, Tbilisi; Attendance: 91; Referees: Mitrović, Kažanegra (MNE)
10 June 2019; 16:00	1× (yellow card) 4× (suspension)	Report	2× (suspension)	Tbilisi Sports Palace, Tbilisi; Attendance: 91; Referees: Mitrović, Kažanegra (MNE)

10 June 2019; 18:00	Georgia	37–17	Ireland	Tbilisi Sports Palace, Tbilisi; Attendance: 300; Referees: Jovandić, Sekulić (SRB)
10 June 2019; 18:00	Tskhovrebadze 7	(18–7)	three players 4	Tbilisi Sports Palace, Tbilisi; Attendance: 300; Referees: Jovandić, Sekulić (SRB)
10 June 2019; 18:00	2× (yellow card) 5× (suspension)	Report	6× (suspension)	Tbilisi Sports Palace, Tbilisi; Attendance: 300; Referees: Jovandić, Sekulić (SRB)

10 June 2019; 20:00	Nigeria	19–27	Bulgaria	Tbilisi Sports Palace, Tbilisi; Attendance: 76; Referees: Ershov, Pavliukov (RUS)
10 June 2019; 20:00	Anih, Kalu 5	(5–12)	Sv. Dimitrov 8	Tbilisi Sports Palace, Tbilisi; Attendance: 76; Referees: Ershov, Pavliukov (RUS)
10 June 2019; 20:00	1× (yellow card) 5× (suspension) 1× (red card)	Report	3× (yellow card) 1× (suspension)	Tbilisi Sports Palace, Tbilisi; Attendance: 76; Referees: Ershov, Pavliukov (RUS)

12 June 2019; 16:00	Ireland	22–37	Bulgaria	Tbilisi Sports Palace, Tbilisi; Attendance: 70; Referees: Hannes, Hannes (GER)
12 June 2019; 16:00	Grace 6	(10–16)	Vasilev 8	Tbilisi Sports Palace, Tbilisi; Attendance: 70; Referees: Hannes, Hannes (GER)
12 June 2019; 16:00	4× (suspension)	Report	2× (yellow card) 4× (suspension)	Tbilisi Sports Palace, Tbilisi; Attendance: 70; Referees: Hannes, Hannes (GER)

12 June 2019; 18:00	Georgia	28–22	United States	Tbilisi Sports Palace, Tbilisi; Attendance: 270; Referees: Bíró, Kiss (HUN)
12 June 2019; 18:00	Tskhovrebadze 9	(17–11)	Lee 6	Tbilisi Sports Palace, Tbilisi; Attendance: 270; Referees: Bíró, Kiss (HUN)
12 June 2019; 18:00	1× (yellow card) 3× (suspension)	Report	5× (suspension)	Tbilisi Sports Palace, Tbilisi; Attendance: 270; Referees: Bíró, Kiss (HUN)

12 June 2019; 20:00	Malta	13–40	Nigeria	Tbilisi Sports Palace, Tbilisi; Attendance: 69; Referees: Vranes, Wenninger (AUT)
12 June 2019; 20:00	Harrison, Seifert 3	(4–18)	Anas 9	Tbilisi Sports Palace, Tbilisi; Attendance: 69; Referees: Vranes, Wenninger (AUT)
12 June 2019; 20:00	4× (suspension)	Report	2× (suspension)	Tbilisi Sports Palace, Tbilisi; Attendance: 69; Referees: Vranes, Wenninger (AUT)

13 June 2019; 16:00	Ireland	41–23	Malta	Tbilisi Sports Palace, Tbilisi; Attendance: 70; Referees: Monitillo, Simone (ITA)
13 June 2019; 16:00	Grace 9	(24–12)	Harrison 6	Tbilisi Sports Palace, Tbilisi; Attendance: 70; Referees: Monitillo, Simone (ITA)
13 June 2019; 16:00	3× (yellow card) 4× (suspension)	Report	1× (yellow card) 4× (suspension)	Tbilisi Sports Palace, Tbilisi; Attendance: 70; Referees: Monitillo, Simone (ITA)

13 June 2019; 18:00	Bulgaria	19–35	Georgia	Tbilisi Sports Palace, Tbilisi; Attendance: 174; Referees: Carmaux, Mursch (FRA)
13 June 2019; 18:00	Balchev, Vasilev 4	(11–19)	Tskhovrebadze 7	Tbilisi Sports Palace, Tbilisi; Attendance: 174; Referees: Carmaux, Mursch (FRA)
13 June 2019; 18:00	1× (yellow card) 5× (suspension)	Report	1× (yellow card) 5× (suspension)	Tbilisi Sports Palace, Tbilisi; Attendance: 174; Referees: Carmaux, Mursch (FRA)

13 June 2019; 20:00	United States	38–24	Nigeria	Tbilisi Sports Palace, Tbilisi; Attendance: 30; Referees: Hermann, Madsen (DEN)
13 June 2019; 20:00	Skorupa 8	(15–10)	four players 4	Tbilisi Sports Palace, Tbilisi; Attendance: 30; Referees: Hermann, Madsen (DEN)
13 June 2019; 20:00	1× (yellow card) 4× (suspension)	Report	5× (suspension)	Tbilisi Sports Palace, Tbilisi; Attendance: 30; Referees: Hermann, Madsen (DEN)

== Knockout stage ==
=== Bracket ===
Semifinals
15 June
Cuba (OT)	39
Bulgaria	36
15 June
Georgia	28
Great Britain	21

Final
16 June
Cuba	21
Georgia	31
Third place game
16 June
Bulgaria	47
Great Britain	31

Fifth place bracket

5–8th place semifinals
15 June
China	28
Nigeria	24
15 June
United States	42
Colombia	32

Fifth place game
16 June
China	27
United States	35
Seventh place game
16 June
Nigeria	33
Colombia	31

Ninth place bracket

9–12th place semifinals
15 June
Azerbaijan	37
Malta	22
15 June
Ireland	38
India (Pen.)	39

Ninth place game
16 June
Azerbaijan	28
India	46
Eleventh place game
16 June
Malta	18
Ireland	39

=== 9–12th place semifinals ===
15 June 2019; 10:00	Azerbaijan	37–22	Malta	Tbilisi Sports Palace, Tbilisi; Attendance: 40; Referees: Ershov, Pavliukov (RUS)
15 June 2019; 10:00	Nazaraliyev 16	(18–13)	Seifret 5	Tbilisi Sports Palace, Tbilisi; Attendance: 40; Referees: Ershov, Pavliukov (RUS)
15 June 2019; 10:00	5× (suspension)	Report	1× (yellow card) 7× (suspension)	Tbilisi Sports Palace, Tbilisi; Attendance: 40; Referees: Ershov, Pavliukov (RUS)

15 June 2019
12:00
Ireland
38–39
India
Tbilisi Sports Palace, Tbilisi
Attendance: 64
Referees: Da Silva, Magalhães (BRA)
Grace 13
(14–19)
N. Singh 10
3× (yellow card) 5× (suspension)
Report
1× (yellow card) 5× (suspension)

FT: 32–32 Pen: 6–7

=== 5–8th place semifinals ===
15 June 2019; 14:00	China	28–24	Nigeria	Tbilisi Sports Palace, Tbilisi; Attendance: 50; Referees: Bíró, Kiss (HUN)
15 June 2019; 14:00	Huang 7	(12–13)	Ani 7	Tbilisi Sports Palace, Tbilisi; Attendance: 50; Referees: Bíró, Kiss (HUN)
15 June 2019; 14:00	1× (yellow card) 4× (suspension)	Report	1× (yellow card) 4× (suspension)	Tbilisi Sports Palace, Tbilisi; Attendance: 50; Referees: Bíró, Kiss (HUN)

15 June 2019; 16:00	United States	42–32	Colombia	Tbilisi Sports Palace, Tbilisi; Attendance: 50; Referees: Carmaux, Mursch (FRA)
15 June 2019; 16:00	Fofana 8	(22–18)	Romero 10	Tbilisi Sports Palace, Tbilisi; Attendance: 50; Referees: Carmaux, Mursch (FRA)
15 June 2019; 16:00	2× (yellow card) 5× (suspension)	Report	5× (suspension) 1× (red card)	Tbilisi Sports Palace, Tbilisi; Attendance: 50; Referees: Carmaux, Mursch (FRA)

=== Semifinals ===
15 June 2019; 18:00	Georgia	28–21	Great Britain	Tbilisi Sports Palace, Tbilisi; Attendance: 198; Referees: Hermann, Madsen (DEN)
15 June 2019; 18:00	Tskhovrebadze 8	(13–10)	Edgar 7	Tbilisi Sports Palace, Tbilisi; Attendance: 198; Referees: Hermann, Madsen (DEN)
15 June 2019; 18:00	1× (yellow card) 3× (suspension)	Report	3× (suspension)	Tbilisi Sports Palace, Tbilisi; Attendance: 198; Referees: Hermann, Madsen (DEN)

15 June 2019
20:00
Cuba
39–36 (ET)
Bulgaria
Tbilisi Sports Palace, Tbilisi
Attendance: 50
Referees: Jovandić, Sekulić (SRB)
Taboada 11
(20–14)
Sv. Dimitrov 15
2× (yellow card) 10× (suspension)
Report
2× (yellow card) 7× (suspension) 1× (red card)

FT: 32–32 ET: 7–4

=== Eleventh place game ===
16 June 2019; 10:00	Malta	18–39	Ireland	Tbilisi Sports Palace, Tbilisi; Attendance: 50; Referees: El-Beltagy, Nasser (EGY)
16 June 2019; 10:00	three players 4	(11–23)	Thompson 9	Tbilisi Sports Palace, Tbilisi; Attendance: 50; Referees: El-Beltagy, Nasser (EGY)
16 June 2019; 10:00	4× (suspension)	Report	3× (suspension)	Tbilisi Sports Palace, Tbilisi; Attendance: 50; Referees: El-Beltagy, Nasser (EGY)

=== Ninth place game ===
16 June 2019; 12:00	Azerbaijan	28–46	India	Tbilisi Sports Palace, Tbilisi; Attendance: 63; Referees: Hermann, Madsen (DEN)
16 June 2019; 12:00	Nazaraliyev 8	(13–18)	Ankit 11	Tbilisi Sports Palace, Tbilisi; Attendance: 63; Referees: Hermann, Madsen (DEN)
16 June 2019; 12:00	1× (yellow card) 4× (suspension)	Report	1× (yellow card) 2× (suspension)	Tbilisi Sports Palace, Tbilisi; Attendance: 63; Referees: Hermann, Madsen (DEN)

=== Seventh place game ===
16 June 2019; 14:00	Nigeria	33–31	Colombia	Tbilisi Sports Palace, Tbilisi; Attendance: 35; Referees: Da Silva, Magalhães (BRA)
16 June 2019; 14:00	Kalu 10	(20–14)	Restrepo 9	Tbilisi Sports Palace, Tbilisi; Attendance: 35; Referees: Da Silva, Magalhães (BRA)
16 June 2019; 14:00	2× (yellow card) 8× (suspension)	Report	1× (yellow card) 4× (suspension)	Tbilisi Sports Palace, Tbilisi; Attendance: 35; Referees: Da Silva, Magalhães (BRA)

=== Fifth place game ===
16 June 2019; 16:00	China	27–35	United States	Tbilisi Sports Palace, Tbilisi; Attendance: 100; Referees: Jovandić, Sekulić (SRB)
16 June 2019; 16:00	Li S. 9	(16–16)	Bengozi 8	Tbilisi Sports Palace, Tbilisi; Attendance: 100; Referees: Jovandić, Sekulić (SRB)
16 June 2019; 16:00	1× (yellow card) 4× (suspension)	Report	1× (yellow card) 5× (suspension)	Tbilisi Sports Palace, Tbilisi; Attendance: 100; Referees: Jovandić, Sekulić (SRB)

=== Third place game ===
16 June 2019; 18:00	Bulgaria	47–31	Great Britain	Tbilisi Sports Palace, Tbilisi; Attendance: 100; Referees: Hannes, Hannes (GER)
16 June 2019; 18:00	Atanasov 12	(26–17)	Da Silva, Edgar 8	Tbilisi Sports Palace, Tbilisi; Attendance: 100; Referees: Hannes, Hannes (GER)
16 June 2019; 18:00	1× (yellow card) 4× (suspension)	Report	1× (suspension)	Tbilisi Sports Palace, Tbilisi; Attendance: 100; Referees: Hannes, Hannes (GER)

=== Final ===
16 June 2019; 20:00	Cuba	21–31	Georgia	Tbilisi Sports Palace, Tbilisi; Attendance: 515; Referees: Bíró, Kiss (HUN)
16 June 2019; 20:00	Taboada, Toledano 5	(10–14)	Tskhovrebadze 8	Tbilisi Sports Palace, Tbilisi; Attendance: 515; Referees: Bíró, Kiss (HUN)
16 June 2019; 20:00	1× (yellow card) 9× (suspension) 1× (red card)	Report	1× (yellow card) 7× (suspension)	Tbilisi Sports Palace, Tbilisi; Attendance: 515; Referees: Bíró, Kiss (HUN)

== Final standings ==
Rank	Team
1st place, gold medalist(s)	Georgia
2nd place, silver medalist(s)	Cuba
3rd place, bronze medalist(s)	Bulgaria
4	Great Britain
5	United States
6	China
7	Nigeria
8	Colombia
9	India
10	Azerbaijan
11	Ireland
12	Malta

Team advanced to the Relegation Round of qualification for EURO 2022

== All-Star Team ==
All-Star Team of the tournament and MVP.

Position	Player
Goalkeeper	(Cuba) Magnol Suárez
Right wing	(Bulgaria) Svetlin Dimitrov
Right back	(Georgia (country)) Giorgi Tskhovrebadze
Centre back	(Bulgaria) Kristian Vasilev
Left back	(Georgia (country)) Teimuraz Orjonikidze
Left wing	(China) Huang Peijie
Pivot	(Cuba) Eduardo Valiente
Most valuable player	(Georgia (country)) Giorgi Tskhovrebadze

== Statistics ==
=== Top goalscorers ===
Rank	Name	Team	Goals	Shots	%
1	Sebastien Edgar	Great Britain	66	84	79
2	Sabir Nazaraliyev	Azerbaijan	64	87	74
3	Sebastián Restrepo	Colombia	56	98	57
4	Svetlin Dimitrov	Bulgaria	55	79	70
5	Joshua Grace	Ireland	54	90	60
6	Giorgi Tskhovrebadze	Georgia	51	76	67
7	Kristian Vasilev	Bulgaria	48	75	64
7	Devinder Singh	India	48	95	51
9	Omar Toledano	Cuba	43	70	61
10	Aboubakar Fofana	United States	42	78	54

Source: IHF

=== Top goalkeepers ===
Rank	Name	Team	%	Saves	Shots
1	Zurab Tsinsadze	Georgia	47	35	75
2	Shota Tevzadze	Georgia	47	75	161
3	Nicolas Robinson	United States	41	49	119
4	Sean O'Reilly	Ireland	41	16	39
5	Anthony Tomas	Ireland	41	9	22
6	Michael Solomon	Nigeria	38	44	116
7	Wang Quan	China	36	42	116
7	Rene Ingram	United States	36	63	174
9	Stefan Dimitrov	Bulgaria	36	26	72
10	Ivaylo Kostov	Bulgaria	36	81	228

Source: IHF
