= Cyprus men's national handball team =

Cyprus

Information
- Association: Cyprus Handball Federation
- Coach: Kostakis Orfanou

Colours
1st	2nd
- Last updated on Unknown.

The Cyprus national handball team is the national handball team of Cyprus and is controlled by the Cyprus Handball Federation.

== IHF Emerging Nations Championship record ==
- 2017 – 4th place
- 2023 – 2nd place
- 2025 – 6th place
