= Armenian Handball Federation =

Sporting organization

Armenian Handball Federation logo

The Armenian Handball Federation (Armenian: Հայաստանի հանդբոլի ֆեդերացիա), also known as the Handball Federation of Armenia, is the regulating body of handball and beach handball in Armenia, governed by the Armenian Olympic Committee. The headquarters of the federation is located in Yerevan.

== History ==
Handball competitions were held in Armenia as early as 1922 and Armenian handball athletes have regularly participated in USSR championships.

Former Armenian Handball Federation logo used until 2023

The Federation is currently led by president Harutyun Melkonyan. The Federation manages the Armenia men's national handball team and operates handball clubs throughout the country. The Federation is a full member of the International Handball Federation and the European Handball Federation. Armenian handball athletes participate in various World, European and Olympic level handball competitions.

In January 2012, the President of the European Handball Federation, Tor Lian, stated that "Armenia was becoming more integrated into the international handball family" and that the European Handball Federation would support and deepen cooperation with the Armenian Handball Federation.

== Activities ==
In July 2010, representatives of the Federation met with the President of the International Handball Federation, Dr. Hasan Mustafa. A number of issues related to the development of handball in Armenia were discussed.

The Federation organizes the annual Prime Minister's Cup, where handball athletes from Armenia and other countries compete. In November 2011, representatives from Russia, Belgium, Czech Republic, Ukraine, Georgia, Iran and Uzbekistan took part in the tournament.

== See also ==
- Sport in Armenia
