= Malta men's national handball team =

Malta

Information
- Nickname: Il-Ħomor
- Association: Malta Handball Association
- Coach: Bryan Pace
- Most caps: Dennis Zammit (35)
- Most goals: Roberto Ragonesi (108)

Colours
1st	2nd
- Last updated on Unknown.

The Malta national handball team represents the Malta Handball Association in international handball matches held under the auspices of the European Handball Federation. Players for the national team have always been selected from the four competing handball teams on Malta.

== IHF Emerging Nations Championship record ==
- 2015 – 8th place
- 2017 – 13th place
- 2019 – 12th place
- 2023 – 11th place
