= Albania men's national handball team =

Albania

Information
- Association: Fédération Albanaise de Handball
- Coach: Lulzim Ismaili

Colours
1st	2nd
- Last updated on Unknown.

The Albania national handball team is the national handball team of Albania, representing the country in international matches. It is controlled by the Fédération Albanaise de Handball.

== IHF Emerging Nations Championship record ==
- 2015 – 14th place
- 2017 – 15th place
