= Ramazan Döne =

Turkish handball player (born 1981)

Personal information
- Full name: Ramazan Döne
- Nationality: Turkish
- Born: 10 July 1981 (age 45) Rize, Turkey
- Height: 1.92 m (6 ft 4 in)

Sport
- Sport: Handball
- Position: Right back
- Current club: Besiktas Mogaz HT
- Number: 53

Youth career
- Years: Team
- –1999: Rize İslampaşa SK

Senior clubs
- Years: Team
- 1999-2006: Ҫankaya Bel. Ankara
- 2006-: Besiktas Mogaz HT
National team
- Years: Team
- –: Turkey
Medal record
Mediterranean Games
Bronze medal – third place	2013 Mersin	Team

Ramazan Döne (born 10 July 1981) is a Turkish handballer who plays for Besiktas Mogaz HT and the Turkey national team.

== Achievements ==
- Turkish Super League:
  - Winner: 2007, 2009, 2010, 2011, 2012, 2013, 2014, 2015, 2016
- Turkish Cup:
  - Winner: 2009, 2010, 2011, 2012, 2014, 2015, 2016, 2017
- Turkish Supercup:
  - Winner: 2006, 2007, 2010, 2012, 2014, 2015, 2016
- Mediterranean Games:
  - Bronze Medalist: 2013
- IHF Emerging Nations Championship:
  - Finalist: 2017
