= 2017 IHF Emerging Nations Championship =

2nd IHF Emerging Nations Championship 2017

Tournament details
- Host country: Bulgaria
- Venues: 2 (in 2 host cities)
- Dates: 12–18 June
- Teams: 16 (from 2 confederations)

Final positions
- Champions: Faroe Islands (2nd title)
- Runners-up: Turkey
- Third place: Kosovo
- Fourth place: Cyprus

Tournament statistics
- Matches played: 48
- Goals scored: 2,885 (60.1 per match)
- Top scorer(s): (Bulgaria) Svetlin Dimitrov (65 goals)

The 2017 IHF Emerging Nations Handball Championship was the second edition of the IHF Emerging Nations Championship held in Bulgaria under the aegis of International Handball Federation. The tournament was held in two cities, Gabrovo and Veliko Tarnovo, from 12 to 18 June 2017.

A total of sixteen countries participated in the tournament out of which 15 are European except China.

Faroe Islands defended their title by defeating Turkey 26–25 in the final.

Three best-ranked teams from this tournament earned the right to participate at the 2nd phase of qualification for EURO 2020

== Venues ==
The championship were played at two venues in Gabrovo and Veliko Tarnovo in Bulgaria.

Gabrovo	2017 IHF Emerging Nations Championship is located in Bulgaria
Orlovetz Sports Hall; Capacity: 1,920	2017 IHF Emerging Nations Championship is located in Bulgaria
Veliko Tarnovo	2017 IHF Emerging Nations Championship is located in Bulgaria
Palace of Culture and Sport; Capacity: 1,600	2017 IHF Emerging Nations Championship is located in Bulgaria

== Participating teams ==
Country	Previous appearances in championship
Albania	1 (2015)
Andorra	1 (2015)
Armenia	1 (2015)
Azerbaijan	0 (debut)
Bulgaria	1 (2015)
China	1 (2015)
Cyprus	0 (debut)
Faroe Islands	1 (**2015**)
Georgia	0 (debut)
Great Britain	1 (2015)
Ireland	1 (2015)
Kosovo	1 (2015)
Luxembourg	0 (debut)
Malta	1 (2015)
Moldova	1 (2015)
Turkey	0 (debut)

^{1} Bold indicates champion for that year. Italics indicates host.

== Draw ==
The draw was held on 7 March 2017 at 19:00.

=== Seeding ===
Pot 1	Pot 2	Pot 3
Cyprus; Turkey; Luxembourg; China	Faroe Islands; Kosovo; Georgia; Bulgaria	Albania; Andorra; Armenia; Azerbaijan; Great Britain; Ireland; Moldova; Malta

== Referees ==
The following referees were appointed for the championship:

Referees
Algeria	Youcef Belkhiri; Sid Ali Hamidi
Austria	Denis Bolic; Christoph Hurich
Bulgaria	Georgi Doychinov; Yulian Goretsov
China	Zhou Yunlei; Cheng Yufeng
Egypt	Yasmina El-Saied; Heidy El-Saied
Great Britain	Jason Hollis; Nicholas Le-mon
Italy	Simone Zendalli; Stefano Riello

Referees
Kosovo	Sherif Xhema; Besfort Jahja
Montenegro	Jelena Vujačić; Andelina Kažanegra
Poland	Maciej Łabuń; Jakub Jerlecki
Portugal	Vania Sá; Marta Sá
Serbia	Marko Boričić; Dejan Marković
Sweden	Maria Bennani; Safia Bennani
Ukraine	Marina Duplii; Olena Kaverina

== Preliminary round ==
The top two teams from each group advanced to the knockout stage.

All times are local (UTC+3).

=== Tie-breaking criteria ===
For the group stage of this tournament, where two or more teams in a group tied on an equal number of points, the finishing positions will be determined by the following tie-breaking criteria in the following order:

1. Number of points obtained in the matches among the teams in question
2. Goal difference in the matches among the teams in question
3. Number of goals scored in the matches among the teams in question (if more than two teams finish equal on points)
4. Goal difference in all the group matches
5. Number of goals scored in all the group matches
6. Drawing of lots

=== Group A ===
Pos	Team	Pld	W	D	L	GF	GA	GD	Pts	Qualification
1	Turkey	3	3	0	0	120	62	+58	**6**	Quarterfinals
2	Kosovo	3	2	0	1	115	72	+43	**4**	Quarterfinals
3	Ireland	3	1	0	2	106	121	−15	**2**	
4	Albania	3	0	0	3	62	148	−86	**0**	

Source: IHF
Rules for classification: 1) points; 2) head-to-head points; 3) head-to-head goal difference; 4) head-to-head number of goals scored; 5) goal difference.

12 June 2017; 14:00	**Turkey**	**25–24**	**Kosovo**	Vasil Levski Palace of Culture and Sports, Veliko Tarnovo; Referees: Bennani, Bennani (SWE)
12 June 2017; 14:00	Döne 7	(13–12)	Beshiri 5	Vasil Levski Palace of Culture and Sports, Veliko Tarnovo; Referees: Bennani, Bennani (SWE)
12 June 2017; 14:00	3× (yellow card) 8× (suspension) 1× (red card)	Report	3× (yellow card) 5× (suspension)	Vasil Levski Palace of Culture and Sports, Veliko Tarnovo; Referees: Bennani, Bennani (SWE)

12 June 2017; 16:00	**Albania**	**33–50**	**Ireland**	Vasil Levski Palace of Culture and Sports, Veliko Tarnovo; Referees: Zhou, Cheng (CHN)
12 June 2017; 16:00	Shingjini 10	(18–25)	Bregazzi 13	Vasil Levski Palace of Culture and Sports, Veliko Tarnovo; Referees: Zhou, Cheng (CHN)
12 June 2017; 16:00	1× (yellow card) 4× (suspension)	Report	2× (yellow card) 5× (suspension)	Vasil Levski Palace of Culture and Sports, Veliko Tarnovo; Referees: Zhou, Cheng (CHN)

13 June 2017; 14:00	**Kosovo**	**47–30**	**Ireland**	Vasil Levski Palace of Culture and Sports, Veliko Tarnovo; Referees: Duplii, Kaverina (UKR)
13 June 2017; 14:00	Jupa 10	(23–14)	J. Krohn, O'Brien 6	Vasil Levski Palace of Culture and Sports, Veliko Tarnovo; Referees: Duplii, Kaverina (UKR)
13 June 2017; 14:00	2× (yellow card) 5× (suspension)	Report	3× (yellow card) 4× (suspension)	Vasil Levski Palace of Culture and Sports, Veliko Tarnovo; Referees: Duplii, Kaverina (UKR)

13 June 2017; 16:00	**Turkey**	**54–12**	**Albania**	Vasil Levski Palace of Culture and Sports, Veliko Tarnovo; Referees: Hollis, Le-Mon (GBR)
13 June 2017; 16:00	Öztürk 10	(27–6)	Shingjini 6	Vasil Levski Palace of Culture and Sports, Veliko Tarnovo; Referees: Hollis, Le-Mon (GBR)
13 June 2017; 16:00	1× (yellow card) 4× (suspension)	Report	2× (yellow card) 11× (suspension) 1× (red card)	Vasil Levski Palace of Culture and Sports, Veliko Tarnovo; Referees: Hollis, Le-Mon (GBR)

14 June 2017; 14:00	**Ireland**	**26–41**	**Turkey**	Vasil Levski Palace of Culture and Sports, Veliko Tarnovo; Referees: Doychinov, Gpretsov (BUL)
14 June 2017; 14:00	J. Krohn 7	(14–18)	Kanberoğlu 10	Vasil Levski Palace of Culture and Sports, Veliko Tarnovo; Referees: Doychinov, Gpretsov (BUL)
14 June 2017; 14:00	2× (yellow card) 4× (suspension)	Report	2× (yellow card) 4× (suspension)	Vasil Levski Palace of Culture and Sports, Veliko Tarnovo; Referees: Doychinov, Gpretsov (BUL)

14 June 2017; 16:00	**Kosovo**	**44–17**	**Albania**	Vasil Levski Palace of Culture and Sports, Veliko Tarnovo; Referees: El-Saied, El-Saied (EGY)
14 June 2017; 16:00	Tahirukaj 9	(20–8)	Shingjini 7	Vasil Levski Palace of Culture and Sports, Veliko Tarnovo; Referees: El-Saied, El-Saied (EGY)
14 June 2017; 16:00	2× (yellow card) 3× (suspension)	Report	1× (yellow card) 2× (suspension)	Vasil Levski Palace of Culture and Sports, Veliko Tarnovo; Referees: El-Saied, El-Saied (EGY)

=== Group B ===
Pos	Team	Pld	W	D	L	GF	GA	GD	Pts	Qualification
1	Luxembourg	3	3	0	0	111	86	+25	**6**	Quarterfinals
2	Georgia	3	2	0	1	91	81	+10	**4**	Quarterfinals
3	Great Britain	3	1	0	2	80	89	−9	**2**	
4	Malta	3	0	0	3	65	91	−26	**0**	

Source: IHF
Rules for classification: 1) points; 2) head-to-head points; 3) head-to-head goal difference; 4) head-to-head number of goals scored; 5) goal difference.

12 June 2017; 18:00	**Luxembourg**	**35–29**	**Georgia**	Vasil Levski Palace of Culture and Sports, Veliko Tarnovo; Referees: Doychinov, Gpretsov (BUL)
12 June 2017; 18:00	Muller 10	(18–14)	Orjonikidze, Tskhovrebadze 6	Vasil Levski Palace of Culture and Sports, Veliko Tarnovo; Referees: Doychinov, Gpretsov (BUL)
12 June 2017; 18:00	2× (yellow card) 6× (suspension)	Report	3× (yellow card) 5× (suspension)	Vasil Levski Palace of Culture and Sports, Veliko Tarnovo; Referees: Doychinov, Gpretsov (BUL)

12 June 2017; 20:00	**Malta**	**18–24**	**Great Britain**	Vasil Levski Palace of Culture and Sports, Veliko Tarnovo; Referees: Sá, Sá (POR)
12 June 2017; 20:00	Di Pilato 9	(8–12)	Negrete Lindsay 10	Vasil Levski Palace of Culture and Sports, Veliko Tarnovo; Referees: Sá, Sá (POR)
12 June 2017; 20:00	3× (yellow card) 5× (suspension)	Report	2× (yellow card) 5× (suspension)	Vasil Levski Palace of Culture and Sports, Veliko Tarnovo; Referees: Sá, Sá (POR)

13 June 2017; 18:00	**Georgia**	**34–26**	**Great Britain**	Vasil Levski Palace of Culture and Sports, Veliko Tarnovo; Referees: Vujačić, Kažanegra (MNE)
13 June 2017; 18:00	Orjonikidze 7	(17–11)	Negrete Lindsay 6	Vasil Levski Palace of Culture and Sports, Veliko Tarnovo; Referees: Vujačić, Kažanegra (MNE)
13 June 2017; 18:00	3× (yellow card) 7× (suspension)	Report	4× (yellow card) 8× (suspension)	Vasil Levski Palace of Culture and Sports, Veliko Tarnovo; Referees: Vujačić, Kažanegra (MNE)

13 June 2017; 20:00	**Luxembourg**	**39–27**	**Malta**	Vasil Levski Palace of Culture and Sports, Veliko Tarnovo; Referees: Boričić, Marković (SRB)
13 June 2017; 20:00	Muller 8	(17–11)	Baldacchino 8	Vasil Levski Palace of Culture and Sports, Veliko Tarnovo; Referees: Boričić, Marković (SRB)
13 June 2017; 20:00	3× (yellow card) 4× (suspension)	Report	3× (yellow card) 4× (suspension)	Vasil Levski Palace of Culture and Sports, Veliko Tarnovo; Referees: Boričić, Marković (SRB)

14 June 2017; 18:00	**Great Britain**	**30–37**	**Luxembourg**	Vasil Levski Palace of Culture and Sports, Veliko Tarnovo; Referees: Belkhiri, Hamidi (ALG)
14 June 2017; 18:00	Goodwin 10	(11–20)	Muller 9	Vasil Levski Palace of Culture and Sports, Veliko Tarnovo; Referees: Belkhiri, Hamidi (ALG)
14 June 2017; 18:00	3× (yellow card) 5× (suspension)	Report	2× (yellow card) 9× (suspension) 1× (red card)	Vasil Levski Palace of Culture and Sports, Veliko Tarnovo; Referees: Belkhiri, Hamidi (ALG)

14 June 2017; 20:00	**Georgia**	**28–20**	**Malta**	Vasil Levski Palace of Culture and Sports, Veliko Tarnovo; Referees: Zhou, Cheng (CHN)
14 June 2017; 20:00	Bulbulashvili, Orjonikidze 5	(19–9)	Harrison 4	Vasil Levski Palace of Culture and Sports, Veliko Tarnovo; Referees: Zhou, Cheng (CHN)
14 June 2017; 20:00	3× (yellow card) 4× (suspension)	Report	3× (yellow card) 2× (suspension)	Vasil Levski Palace of Culture and Sports, Veliko Tarnovo; Referees: Zhou, Cheng (CHN)

=== Group C ===
Pos	Team	Pld	W	D	L	GF	GA	GD	Pts	Qualification
1	Cyprus	3	3	0	0	96	64	+32	**6**	Quarterfinals
2	Bulgaria (H)	3	2	0	1	101	75	+26	**4**	Quarterfinals
3	Azerbaijan	3	1	0	2	93	96	−3	**2**	
4	Andorra	3	0	0	3	53	108	−55	**0**	

Source: IHF
Rules for classification: 1) points; 2) head-to-head points; 3) head-to-head goal difference; 4) head-to-head number of goals scored; 5) goal difference.
(H) Hosts

12 June 2017; 18:30	**Cyprus**	**25–22**	**Bulgaria**	Sportna Zala, Gabrovo; Referees: Bolic, Hurich (AUT)
12 June 2017; 18:30	Argyrou 12	(11–12)	Dimitrov 11	Sportna Zala, Gabrovo; Referees: Bolic, Hurich (AUT)
12 June 2017; 18:30	3× (yellow card) 8× (suspension)	Report	2× (yellow card) 7× (suspension)	Sportna Zala, Gabrovo; Referees: Bolic, Hurich (AUT)

12 June 2017; 20:30	**Andorra**	**23–31**	**Azerbaijan**	Sportna Zala, Gabrovo; Referees: El-Saied, El-Saied (EGY)
12 June 2017; 20:30	Pascual 6	(6–15)	Butenko 10	Sportna Zala, Gabrovo; Referees: El-Saied, El-Saied (EGY)
12 June 2017; 20:30	4× (yellow card) 4× (suspension)	Report	3× (yellow card) 1× (suspension)	Sportna Zala, Gabrovo; Referees: El-Saied, El-Saied (EGY)

13 June 2017; 18:00	**Bulgaria**	**41–34**	**Azerbaijan**	Sportna Zala, Gabrovo; Referees: Jerlecki, Łabuń (POL)
13 June 2017; 18:00	Dimitrov 15	(20–15)	Askerov 10	Sportna Zala, Gabrovo; Referees: Jerlecki, Łabuń (POL)
13 June 2017; 18:00	2× (yellow card) 9× (suspension) 1× (red card)	Report	2× (yellow card) 6× (suspension) 1× (red card)	Sportna Zala, Gabrovo; Referees: Jerlecki, Łabuń (POL)

13 June 2017; 20:00	**Cyprus**	**39–14**	**Andorra**	Sportna Zala, Gabrovo; Referees: Xhema, Jahja (KOS)
13 June 2017; 20:00	Antreou 9	(19–7)	Bernabé, Pascual 3	Sportna Zala, Gabrovo; Referees: Xhema, Jahja (KOS)
13 June 2017; 20:00	2× (yellow card) 5× (suspension)	Report	2× (yellow card) 5× (suspension)	Sportna Zala, Gabrovo; Referees: Xhema, Jahja (KOS)

14 June 2017; 18:00	**Bulgaria**	**38–16**	**Andorra**	Sportna Zala, Gabrovo; Referees: Hollis, Le-Mon (GBR)
14 June 2017; 18:00	Dimitrov 16	(19–6)	Toha 4	Sportna Zala, Gabrovo; Referees: Hollis, Le-Mon (GBR)
14 June 2017; 18:00	2× (yellow card) 7× (suspension)	Report	1× (yellow card) 3× (suspension)	Sportna Zala, Gabrovo; Referees: Hollis, Le-Mon (GBR)

14 June 2017; 20:00	**Azerbaijan**	**28–32**	**Cyprus**	Sportna Zala, Gabrovo; Referees: Sá, Sá (POR)
14 June 2017; 20:00	Askerov 8	(13–18)	Argyrou 14	Sportna Zala, Gabrovo; Referees: Sá, Sá (POR)
14 June 2017; 20:00	3× (yellow card) 6× (suspension)	Report	4× (yellow card) 6× (suspension) 2× (red card)	Sportna Zala, Gabrovo; Referees: Sá, Sá (POR)

=== Group D ===
Pos	Team	Pld	W	D	L	GF	GA	GD	Pts	Qualification
1	Faroe Islands	3	3	0	0	114	59	+55	**6**	Quarterfinals
2	China	3	2	0	1	95	64	+31	**4**	Quarterfinals
3	Moldova	3	1	0	2	98	82	+16	**2**	
4	Armenia	3	0	0	3	31	133	−102	**0**	

Source: IHF
Rules for classification: 1) points; 2) head-to-head points; 3) head-to-head goal difference; 4) head-to-head number of goals scored; 5) goal difference.

12 June 2017; 14:00	**Armenia**	**13–46**	**Moldova**	Sportna Zala, Gabrovo; Referees: Zendali, Riello (ITA)
12 June 2017; 14:00	Sahakyan 5	(7–20)	Untu 10	Sportna Zala, Gabrovo; Referees: Zendali, Riello (ITA)
12 June 2017; 14:00	3× (yellow card) 1× (suspension)	Report	3× (yellow card) 2× (suspension)	Sportna Zala, Gabrovo; Referees: Zendali, Riello (ITA)

12 June 2017; 16:00	**China**	**23–30**	**Faroe Islands**	Sportna Zala, Gabrovo; Referees: Belkhiri, Hamidi (ALG)
12 June 2017; 16:00	Liu, Wang J. 6	(7–15)	Klein Olsen 6	Sportna Zala, Gabrovo; Referees: Belkhiri, Hamidi (ALG)
12 June 2017; 16:00	3× (yellow card) 8× (suspension)	Report	4× (yellow card) 3× (suspension)	Sportna Zala, Gabrovo; Referees: Belkhiri, Hamidi (ALG)

13 June 2017; 14:00	**China**	**43–12**	**Armenia**	Sportna Zala, Gabrovo; Referees: Bennani, Bennani (SWE)
13 June 2017; 14:00	Wang J. 11	(21–4)	Sahakyan 6	Sportna Zala, Gabrovo; Referees: Bennani, Bennani (SWE)
13 June 2017; 14:00	2× (yellow card) 4× (suspension)	Report	2× (yellow card) 5× (suspension) 1× (red card)	Sportna Zala, Gabrovo; Referees: Bennani, Bennani (SWE)

13 June 2017; 16:00	**Faroe Islands**	**40–30**	**Moldova**	Sportna Zala, Gabrovo; Referees: Bolic, Hurich (AUT)
13 June 2017; 16:00	Krogh 7	(21–16)	Zacaciurin 8	Sportna Zala, Gabrovo; Referees: Bolic, Hurich (AUT)
13 June 2017; 16:00	2× (yellow card) 2× (suspension)	Report	1× (yellow card) 2× (suspension)	Sportna Zala, Gabrovo; Referees: Bolic, Hurich (AUT)

14 June 2017; 14:00	**Moldova**	**22–29**	**China**	Sportna Zala, Gabrovo; Referees: Vujačić, Kažanegra (MNE)
14 June 2017; 14:00	Zacaciurin 7	(11–15)	He 7	Sportna Zala, Gabrovo; Referees: Vujačić, Kažanegra (MNE)
14 June 2017; 14:00	3× (yellow card) 1× (suspension)	Report	3× (yellow card) 4× (suspension)	Sportna Zala, Gabrovo; Referees: Vujačić, Kažanegra (MNE)

14 June 2017; 16:00	**Faroe Islands**	**44–6**	**Armenia**	Sportna Zala, Gabrovo; Referees: Zendali, Riello (ITA)
14 June 2017; 16:00	Klein Olsen 8	(18–1)	Sahakyan 3	Sportna Zala, Gabrovo; Referees: Zendali, Riello (ITA)
14 June 2017; 16:00	1× (yellow card) 3× (suspension)	Report	1× (yellow card) 1× (suspension)	Sportna Zala, Gabrovo; Referees: Zendali, Riello (ITA)

== Knockout stage ==
=== 9–16th place bracket ===
13th place
**Malta**	**36**
Andorra	25
15th place
Armenia	23
**Albania**	**24**

13–16th place semifinals
**Malta**	**34**
Armenia	23
Albania	23
**Andorra**	**32**

9–16th place quarterfinals
**Ireland**	**31**
Malta	22
**Azerbaijan**	**39**
Armenia	21
**Great Britain**	**42**
Albania	15
**Moldova**	**48**
Andorra	14

9–12th place semifinals
Ireland	33
**Azerbaijan**	**41**
Great Britain	34
**Moldova** (pen.)	**35**

Ninth place
Azerbaijan	31
**Moldova**	**45**
Eleventh place
Ireland	26
**Great Britain**	**39**

==== 9–16th place quarterfinals ====
16 June 2017; 14:00	**Ireland**	**31–22**	**Malta**	Vasil Levski Palace of Culture and Sports, Veliko Tarnovo; Referees: Vujačić, Kažanegra (MNE)
16 June 2017; 14:00	J. Krohn 9	(15–9)	Di Pilato 7	Vasil Levski Palace of Culture and Sports, Veliko Tarnovo; Referees: Vujačić, Kažanegra (MNE)
16 June 2017; 14:00	2× (yellow card) 2× (suspension)	Report	4× (yellow card) 6× (suspension)	Vasil Levski Palace of Culture and Sports, Veliko Tarnovo; Referees: Vujačić, Kažanegra (MNE)

16 June 2017; 14:00	**Azerbaijan**	**39–21**	**Armenia**	Sportna Zala, Gabrovo; Referees: Duplii, Kaverina (UKR)
16 June 2017; 14:00	Butenko 10	(21–7)	Sahakyan 6	Sportna Zala, Gabrovo; Referees: Duplii, Kaverina (UKR)
16 June 2017; 14:00	1× (yellow card) 4× (suspension)	Report	4× (yellow card) 1× (suspension)	Sportna Zala, Gabrovo; Referees: Duplii, Kaverina (UKR)

16 June 2017; 16:00	**Great Britain**	**42–15**	**Albania**	Vasil Levski Palace of Culture and Sports, Veliko Tarnovo; Referees: Bennani, Bennani (SWE)
16 June 2017; 16:00	Whaley 8	(19–8)	Shingjini 6	Vasil Levski Palace of Culture and Sports, Veliko Tarnovo; Referees: Bennani, Bennani (SWE)
16 June 2017; 16:00	3× (yellow card) 4× (suspension)	Report	1× (yellow card) 7× (suspension)	Vasil Levski Palace of Culture and Sports, Veliko Tarnovo; Referees: Bennani, Bennani (SWE)

16 June 2017; 16:00	**Moldova**	**48–14**	**Andorra**	Sportna Zala, Gabrovo; Referees: El-Saied, El-Saied (EGY)
16 June 2017; 16:00	Untu 12	(24–6)	Toha, Travesset 3	Sportna Zala, Gabrovo; Referees: El-Saied, El-Saied (EGY)
16 June 2017; 16:00	1× (yellow card) 2× (suspension)	Report	3× (suspension)	Sportna Zala, Gabrovo; Referees: El-Saied, El-Saied (EGY)

==== 13–16th place semifinals ====
17 June 2017; 18:00	**Malta**	**34–23**	**Armenia**	Vasil Levski Palace of Culture and Sports, Veliko Tarnovo; Referees: Jerlecki, Łabuń (POL)
17 June 2017; 18:00	Naudi 9	(18–13)	Sahakyan 8	Vasil Levski Palace of Culture and Sports, Veliko Tarnovo; Referees: Jerlecki, Łabuń (POL)
17 June 2017; 18:00	1× (yellow card) 4× (suspension)	Report	3× (yellow card) 2× (suspension)	Vasil Levski Palace of Culture and Sports, Veliko Tarnovo; Referees: Jerlecki, Łabuń (POL)

17 June 2017; 20:00	**Albania**	**23–32**	**Andorra**	Vasil Levski Palace of Culture and Sports, Veliko Tarnovo; Referees: Sá, Sá (POR)
17 June 2017; 20:00	Lala 7	(9–11)	Toha 12	Vasil Levski Palace of Culture and Sports, Veliko Tarnovo; Referees: Sá, Sá (POR)
17 June 2017; 20:00	4× (yellow card) 3× (suspension)	Report	2× (yellow card) 7× (suspension)	Vasil Levski Palace of Culture and Sports, Veliko Tarnovo; Referees: Sá, Sá (POR)

==== 9–12th place semifinals ====
17 June 2017; 14:00	**Ireland**	**33–41**	**Azerbaijan**	Vasil Levski Palace of Culture and Sports, Veliko Tarnovo; Referees: Zhou, Cheng (CHN)
17 June 2017; 14:00	T. Krohn 8	(18–20)	Malyarevich 14	Vasil Levski Palace of Culture and Sports, Veliko Tarnovo; Referees: Zhou, Cheng (CHN)
17 June 2017; 14:00	2× (yellow card) 3× (suspension)	Report	3× (yellow card)	Vasil Levski Palace of Culture and Sports, Veliko Tarnovo; Referees: Zhou, Cheng (CHN)

17 June 2017
16:00
Great Britain
**34–35**
Moldova
Vasil Levski Palace of Culture and Sports, Veliko Tarnovo
Referees: Duplii, Kaverina (UKR)
Negrete 9
(17–17)
Untu, Zacaciurin 11
4× (yellow card) 3× (suspension)
Report
2× (yellow card) 4× (suspension)

FT: 33–33 Pen: 1–2

==== 15th place game ====
18 June 2017; 10:00	**Armenia**	**23–24**	**Albania**	Sportna Zala, Gabrovo; Referees: Zhou, Cheng (CHN)
18 June 2017; 10:00	Sahakyan 10	(12–11)	Shingjini 7	Sportna Zala, Gabrovo; Referees: Zhou, Cheng (CHN)
18 June 2017; 10:00	4× (yellow card) 8× (suspension)	Report	4× (yellow card) 6× (suspension)	Sportna Zala, Gabrovo; Referees: Zhou, Cheng (CHN)

==== 13th place game ====
18 June 2017; 12:15	**Malta**	**36–25**	**Andorra**	Sportna Zala, Gabrovo; Referees: Hollis, Le-Mon (GBR)
18 June 2017; 12:15	Naudi 7	(21–10)	three players 6	Sportna Zala, Gabrovo; Referees: Hollis, Le-Mon (GBR)
18 June 2017; 12:15	4× (suspension)	Report	1× (yellow card) 2× (suspension)	Sportna Zala, Gabrovo; Referees: Hollis, Le-Mon (GBR)

==== Eleventh place game ====
18 June 2017; 16:45	**Ireland**	**26–39**	**Great Britain**	Sportna Zala, Gabrovo; Referees: El-Saied, El-Saied (EGY)
18 June 2017; 16:45	Bregazzi 7	(12–20)	Goodwin 7	Sportna Zala, Gabrovo; Referees: El-Saied, El-Saied (EGY)
18 June 2017; 16:45	2× (yellow card) 5× (suspension) 1× (red card)	Report	5× (suspension)	Sportna Zala, Gabrovo; Referees: El-Saied, El-Saied (EGY)

==== Ninth place game ====
18 June 2017; 14:30	**Azerbaijan**	**31–45**	**Moldova**	Sportna Zala, Gabrovo; Referees: Vujačić, Kažanegra (MNE)
18 June 2017; 14:30	Butenko 9	(14–22)	Zacaciurin 14	Sportna Zala, Gabrovo; Referees: Vujačić, Kažanegra (MNE)
18 June 2017; 14:30	2× (yellow card) 2× (suspension)	Report	2× (yellow card) 3× (suspension)	Sportna Zala, Gabrovo; Referees: Vujačić, Kažanegra (MNE)

=== Championship bracket ===
Fifth place
China	30
**Bulgaria**	**38**
Seventh place
Georgia	25
**Luxembourg**	**32**

5–8th place semifinals
Georgia	28
**China**	**31**
Luxembourg	31
**Bulgaria**	**37**

Quarterfinals
**Turkey**	**32**
Georgia	26
**Cyprus**	**36**
China	26
Luxembourg	23
**Kosovo**	**34**
**Faroe Islands**	**30**
Bulgaria	24

Semifinals
**Turkey** (OT)	**35**
Cyprus	32
Kosovo	30
**Faroe Islands**	**33**

Final
Turkey	25
**Faroe Islands**	**26**
Third place
Cyprus	25
**Kosovo**	**32**

==== Quarterfinals ====
16 June 2017; 18:00	**Turkey**	**32–26**	**Georgia**	Vasil Levski Palace of Culture and Sports, Veliko Tarnovo; Referees: Xhema, Jahja (KOS)
16 June 2017; 18:00	Döne 15	(16–15)	Orjonikidze 8	Vasil Levski Palace of Culture and Sports, Veliko Tarnovo; Referees: Xhema, Jahja (KOS)
16 June 2017; 18:00	3× (yellow card) 4× (suspension)	Report	2× (yellow card) 5× (suspension)	Vasil Levski Palace of Culture and Sports, Veliko Tarnovo; Referees: Xhema, Jahja (KOS)

16 June 2017; 18:00	**Cyprus**	**36–26**	**China**	Sportna Zala, Gabrovo; Referees: Boričić, Marković (SRB)
16 June 2017; 18:00	Georgiou 9	(16–9)	Liu Z. 7	Sportna Zala, Gabrovo; Referees: Boričić, Marković (SRB)
16 June 2017; 18:00	3× (yellow card) 6× (suspension)	Report	3× (yellow card) 5× (suspension)	Sportna Zala, Gabrovo; Referees: Boričić, Marković (SRB)

16 June 2017; 20:00	**Luxembourg**	**23–34**	**Kosovo**	Vasil Levski Palace of Culture and Sports, Veliko Tarnovo; Referees: Jerlecki, Łabuń (POL)
16 June 2017; 20:00	Krier 6	(11–17)	Dedaj 9	Vasil Levski Palace of Culture and Sports, Veliko Tarnovo; Referees: Jerlecki, Łabuń (POL)
16 June 2017; 20:00	2× (yellow card) 6× (suspension)	Report	4× (yellow card) 7× (suspension)	Vasil Levski Palace of Culture and Sports, Veliko Tarnovo; Referees: Jerlecki, Łabuń (POL)

16 June 2017; 20:00	**Faroe Islands**	**30–24**	**Bulgaria**	Sportna Zala, Gabrovo; Referees: Belkhiri, Hamidi (ALG)
16 June 2017; 20:00	Sigurbjørnsson 9	(13–14)	Yakubov 6	Sportna Zala, Gabrovo; Referees: Belkhiri, Hamidi (ALG)
16 June 2017; 20:00	2× (yellow card) 2× (suspension)	Report	1× (yellow card) 4× (suspension)	Sportna Zala, Gabrovo; Referees: Belkhiri, Hamidi (ALG)

==== 5–8th place semifinals ====
17 June 2017; 14:00	**Georgia**	**28–31**	**China**	Sportna Zala, Gabrovo; Referees: Zendali, Riello (ITA)
17 June 2017; 14:00	Tskhovrebadze 9	(11–15)	Wang J. 12	Sportna Zala, Gabrovo; Referees: Zendali, Riello (ITA)
17 June 2017; 14:00	3× (yellow card) 4× (suspension)	Report	3× (yellow card) 6× (suspension) 1× (red card)	Sportna Zala, Gabrovo; Referees: Zendali, Riello (ITA)

17 June 2017; 16:00	**Luxembourg**	**31–37**	**Bulgaria**	Sportna Zala, Gabrovo; Referees: Boričić, Marković (SRB)
17 June 2017; 16:00	Zekan 6	(13–20)	Dimitrov 13	Sportna Zala, Gabrovo; Referees: Boričić, Marković (SRB)
17 June 2017; 16:00	3× (yellow card) 11× (suspension)	Report	3× (yellow card) 6× (suspension)	Sportna Zala, Gabrovo; Referees: Boričić, Marković (SRB)

==== Semifinals ====
17 June 2017
18:00
Turkey
**35–32** **(ET)**
Cyprus
Sportna Zala, Gabrovo
Referees: Doychinov, Gpretsov (BUL)
Biçer 11
(13–15)
Argyrou 10
3× (yellow card) 5× (suspension) 1× (red card)
Report
2× (yellow card) 4× (suspension)

FT: 26–26 ET: 3–3, 6–3

17 June 2017; 20:00	**Kosovo**	**30–33**	**Faroe Islands**	Sportna Zala, Gabrovo; Referees: Bolic, Hurich (AUT)
17 June 2017; 20:00	Dedaj, Jupa 6	(11–15)	Krogh 9	Sportna Zala, Gabrovo; Referees: Bolic, Hurich (AUT)
17 June 2017; 20:00	1× (yellow card) 4× (suspension)	Report	2× (yellow card) 5× (suspension) 1× (red card)	Sportna Zala, Gabrovo; Referees: Bolic, Hurich (AUT)

==== Seventh place game ====
18 June 2017; 14:15	**Georgia**	**25–32**	**Luxembourg**	Vasil Levski Palace of Culture and Sports, Veliko Tarnovo; Referees: Xhema, Jahja (KOS)
18 June 2017; 14:15	Bulbulashvili 5	(10–15)	Muller 8	Vasil Levski Palace of Culture and Sports, Veliko Tarnovo; Referees: Xhema, Jahja (KOS)
18 June 2017; 14:15	2× (yellow card) 5× (suspension)	Report	3× (yellow card) 9× (suspension)	Vasil Levski Palace of Culture and Sports, Veliko Tarnovo; Referees: Xhema, Jahja (KOS)

==== Fifth place game ====
18 June 2017; 16:30	**China**	**30–38**	**Bulgaria**	Vasil Levski Palace of Culture and Sports, Veliko Tarnovo; Referees: Belkhiri, Hamidi (ALG)
18 June 2017; 16:30	Wang J. 8	(11–18)	Atanasov 8	Vasil Levski Palace of Culture and Sports, Veliko Tarnovo; Referees: Belkhiri, Hamidi (ALG)
18 June 2017; 16:30	1× (yellow card) 4× (suspension) 1× (red card)	Report	3× (yellow card) 3× (suspension) 1× (red card)	Vasil Levski Palace of Culture and Sports, Veliko Tarnovo; Referees: Belkhiri, Hamidi (ALG)

==== Third place game ====
18 June 2017; 18:45	**Cyprus**	**25–32**	**Kosovo**	Vasil Levski Palace of Culture and Sports, Veliko Tarnovo; Referees: Zendali, Riello (ITA)
18 June 2017; 18:45	Fotiou 9	(12–16)	Tahirukaj 8	Vasil Levski Palace of Culture and Sports, Veliko Tarnovo; Referees: Zendali, Riello (ITA)
18 June 2017; 18:45	2× (yellow card) 5× (suspension)	Report	2× (yellow card) 5× (suspension) 1× (red card)	Vasil Levski Palace of Culture and Sports, Veliko Tarnovo; Referees: Zendali, Riello (ITA)

==== Final ====
18 June 2017; 21:00	**Turkey**	**25–26**	**Faroe Islands**	Vasil Levski Palace of Culture and Sports, Veliko Tarnovo; Referees: Boričić, Marković (SRB)
18 June 2017; 21:00	Biçer 6	(11–13)	Krogh 9	Vasil Levski Palace of Culture and Sports, Veliko Tarnovo; Referees: Boričić, Marković (SRB)
18 June 2017; 21:00	3× (yellow card) 6× (suspension)	Report	4× (yellow card) 5× (suspension)	Vasil Levski Palace of Culture and Sports, Veliko Tarnovo; Referees: Boričić, Marković (SRB)

== Final standings ==
Rank	Team
Gold medal	Faroe Islands
Silver medal	Turkey
Bronze medal	Kosovo
4	Cyprus
5	Bulgaria
6	China
7	Luxembourg
8	Georgia
9	Moldova
10	Azerbaijan
11	Great Britain
12	Ireland
13	Malta
14	Andorra
15	Albania
16	Armenia

Teams advanced to the **2nd phase of qualification for EURO 2020**

== Statistics ==
=== Top goalscorers ===
Rank	Name	Team	Goals	Shots	%
1	Svetlin Dimitrov	Bulgaria	65	92	71
2	Maxim Butenko	Azerbaijan	55	84	65
3	Roman Zacaciurin	Moldova	54	86	63
4	Julios Argyrou	Cyprus	51	72	71
5	Wang Juncheng	China	49	95	52
6	Dinu Untu	Moldova	45	63	71
7	Martin Muller	Luxembourg	44	71	62
8	Joshua Krohn Grace	Ireland	43	85	51
9	Igli Shingjini	Albania	42	92	46
10	Brian Negrete Lindsay	Great Britain	40	63	63

Source: IHF

=== Top goalkeepers ===
Rank	Name	Team	%	Saves	Shots
1	Eliesar Rubeksen	Faroe Islands	68	23	34
2	Antonis Papayiannis	Cyprus	54	13	24
3	Ion Saharnean	Moldova	45	51	113
4	Armir Agushi	Kosovo	41	24	59
5	Mehmet Emre	Turkey	40	42	106
6	Mihail Penev	Bulgaria	39	52	134
7	Coşkun Göktepe	Turkey	35	45	127
8	Liu Maike	China	34	50	146
9	Ivan Ivanov	Bulgaria	33	42	126
9	Jan Pauli Johannesen	Faroe Islands	33	60	180
9	Alexander Bradley	Great Britain	33	48	144

Source: IHF
