= Svetlin Dimitrov =

Bulgarian handball player

Personal information
- Nationality: Bulgarian
- Born: 5 November 1990 (age 35) Veliko Tarnovo, Bulgaria
- Height: 1.80 m (5 ft 11 in)

Sport
- Sport: Handball
- Position: Right wing
- Current club: C' Chartres Métropole Handball
- Number: 19

Senior clubs
- Years: Team
- 2008–2011: HC Dobrudja Dobrich
- 2011–2020: CO Vernouillet HB
- 2020–: C' Chartres MHB
National team
- Years: Team
- –: Bulgaria

Svetlin Dimitrov (Bulgarian: Светлин Димитров) (born 5 November 1990) is a Bulgarian handballer for C' Chartres Métropole Handball and the Bulgarian national team.

== Achievements ==
- Championnat de France Nationale 2:
  - Winner: 2014

== Individual awards ==
- IHF Emerging Nations Championship
  - Top Scorer: 2015, 2017
  - Best right wing: 2019
