= 2015 IHF Emerging Nations Championship =

Tournament details
- Host country: Kosovo
- Venues: 2 (in 2 host cities)
- Dates: 20–26 June
- Teams: 16 (from 5 confederations)

Final positions
- Champions: Faroe Islands (1st title)
- Runners-up: Latvia
- Third place: Kosovo
- Fourth place: Uruguay

Tournament statistics
- Top scorers: (Bulgaria) Svetlin Dimitrov (64 goals)

Awards
- Best player: (Faroe Islands) Tróndur Kragesteen

The 2015 IHF Emerging Nations Championship was the first edition of the IHF Emerging Nations Championship, organised by the International Handball Federation (IHF). The tournament was held in Pristina and Gjakova, Kosovo, from 20 to 26 June.

A total of 16 nations played in the tournament: several European teams that did not qualify to the 2014 European Men's Handball Championship, plus Australia, Cameroon, China and Uruguay.

== Referees ==
Following eight referee pairs are selected:

Referees
Andorra	Mohamed Bedoui Kouichli; Lluis Coll Exposito
Bosnia and Herzegovina	Kulovic Edin; Skaljic Vedad
Bulgaria	Zvezdelin Yonchev; Svetoslav Yovchev
Cameroon	Ndemdou Blaise; Ngassa Laure

Referees
China	Zhou Yunlei; Cheng Yufeng
United Kingdom	Hollis Jason Mark; Le-Mon Nicholas Thomas
Kosovo	Ilir Bytyqi; Syart Kasapi
Latvia	Martins Leitis; Ralfs Persis

== Venues ==
The championship were played at two venues in Pristina and Gjakova in Kosovo.

Pristina	Gjakova	2015 IHF Emerging Nations Championship is located in Kosovo
Palace of Youth and Sports; Capacity: 3,000	Shani Nushi Sports Hall; Capacity: 2,500	2015 IHF Emerging Nations Championship is located in Kosovo

== Preliminary round ==
The top two teams from each group advanced to the knockout stage.

=== Tie-breaking criteria ===
For the group stage of this tournament, where two or more teams in a group tied on an equal number of points, the finishing positions will be determined by the following tie-breaking criteria in the following order:

1. number of points obtained in the matches among the teams in question
2. goal difference in the matches among the teams in question
3. number of goals scored in the matches among the teams in question (if more than two teams finish equal on points)
4. goal difference in all the group matches
5. number of goals scored in all the group matches
6. drawing of lots

=== Group A ===
Team	Pld	W	D	L	GF	GA	GD	Pts
Faroe Islands	3	2	1	0	131	73	+58	5
Kosovo	3	2	0	1	121	77	+44	4
Australia	3	1	1	1	119	85	+34	3
Armenia	3	0	0	3	46	182	−136	0

20 June 2015; 15:15	Faroe Islands	34–34	Australia	Pallati i Rinisë, Pristina; Attendance: 100; Referees: Bedoui, Coll Exposito (AND)
20 June 2015; 15:15		(16–18)		Pallati i Rinisë, Pristina; Attendance: 100; Referees: Bedoui, Coll Exposito (AND)
20 June 2015; 15:15		Report		Pallati i Rinisë, Pristina; Attendance: 100; Referees: Bedoui, Coll Exposito (AND)

20 June 2015; 18:00	Kosovo	60–17	Armenia	Pallati i Rinisë, Pristina; Attendance: 800; Referees: Leitis, Persis (LAT)
20 June 2015; 18:00		(32–4)		Pallati i Rinisë, Pristina; Attendance: 800; Referees: Leitis, Persis (LAT)
20 June 2015; 18:00		Report		Pallati i Rinisë, Pristina; Attendance: 800; Referees: Leitis, Persis (LAT)

21 June 2015; 13:30	Armenia	9–61	Faroe Islands	Pallati i Rinisë, Pristina; Attendance: 100; Referees: Yunlei, Yufeng (CHN)
21 June 2015; 13:30		(4–27)		Pallati i Rinisë, Pristina; Attendance: 100; Referees: Yunlei, Yufeng (CHN)
21 June 2015; 13:30		Report		Pallati i Rinisë, Pristina; Attendance: 100; Referees: Yunlei, Yufeng (CHN)

21 June 2015; 18:00	Australia	24–31	Kosovo	Pallati i Rinisë, Pristina; Attendance: 1,000; Referees: Yonchev, Yovchev (BUL)
21 June 2015; 18:00		(12–16)		Pallati i Rinisë, Pristina; Attendance: 1,000; Referees: Yonchev, Yovchev (BUL)
21 June 2015; 18:00		Report		Pallati i Rinisë, Pristina; Attendance: 1,000; Referees: Yonchev, Yovchev (BUL)

22 June 2015; 13:30	Australia	61–20	Armenia	Pallati i Rinisë, Pristina; Attendance: 200; Referees: Bedoui, Coll Exposito (AND)
22 June 2015; 13:30		(28–9)		Pallati i Rinisë, Pristina; Attendance: 200; Referees: Bedoui, Coll Exposito (AND)
22 June 2015; 13:30		Report		Pallati i Rinisë, Pristina; Attendance: 200; Referees: Bedoui, Coll Exposito (AND)

22 June 2015; 18:00	Faroe Islands	36–30	Kosovo	Pallati i Rinisë, Pristina; Attendance: 1,200; Referees: Leitis, Persis (LAT)
22 June 2015; 18:00		(19–12)		Pallati i Rinisë, Pristina; Attendance: 1,200; Referees: Leitis, Persis (LAT)
22 June 2015; 18:00		Report		Pallati i Rinisë, Pristina; Attendance: 1,200; Referees: Leitis, Persis (LAT)

=== Group B ===
Team	Pld	W	D	L	GF	GA	GD	Pts
Estonia	3	2	0	1	102	65	+37	4
Cameroon	3	2	0	1	100	58	+42	4
Great Britain	3	2	0	1	110	71	+39	4
Albania	3	0	0	3	46	164	−118	0

20 June 2015; 13:00	Estonia	26–27	Great Britain	Pallati i Rinisë, Pristina; Attendance: 100; Referees: Yunlei, Yufeng (CHN)
20 June 2015; 13:00		(12–15)		Pallati i Rinisë, Pristina; Attendance: 100; Referees: Yunlei, Yufeng (CHN)
20 June 2015; 13:00		Report		Pallati i Rinisë, Pristina; Attendance: 100; Referees: Yunlei, Yufeng (CHN)

20 June 2015; 20:15	Cameroon	51–12	Albania	Pallati i Rinisë, Pristina; Attendance: 300; Referees: Yonchev, Yovchev (BUL)
20 June 2015; 20:15		(25–8)		Pallati i Rinisë, Pristina; Attendance: 300; Referees: Yonchev, Yovchev (BUL)
20 June 2015; 20:15		Report		Pallati i Rinisë, Pristina; Attendance: 300; Referees: Yonchev, Yovchev (BUL)

21 June 2015; 15:45	Great Britain	16–23	Cameroon	Pallati i Rinisë, Pristina; Attendance: 100; Referees: Leitis, Persis (LAT)
21 June 2015; 15:45		(9–9)		Pallati i Rinisë, Pristina; Attendance: 100; Referees: Leitis, Persis (LAT)
21 June 2015; 15:45		Report		Pallati i Rinisë, Pristina; Attendance: 100; Referees: Leitis, Persis (LAT)

21 June 2015; 20:15	Albania	12–46	Estonia	Pallati i Rinisë, Pristina; Attendance: 100; Referees: Bedoui, Coll Exposito (AND)
21 June 2015; 20:15		(6–20)		Pallati i Rinisë, Pristina; Attendance: 100; Referees: Bedoui, Coll Exposito (AND)
21 June 2015; 20:15		Report		Pallati i Rinisë, Pristina; Attendance: 100; Referees: Bedoui, Coll Exposito (AND)

22 June 2015; 15:45	Great Britain	67–22	Albania	Pallati i Rinisë, Pristina; Attendance: 200; Referees: Yunlei, Yufeng (CHN)
22 June 2015; 15:45		(34–8)		Pallati i Rinisë, Pristina; Attendance: 200; Referees: Yunlei, Yufeng (CHN)
22 June 2015; 15:45		Report		Pallati i Rinisë, Pristina; Attendance: 200; Referees: Yunlei, Yufeng (CHN)

22 June 2015; 20:15	Estonia	30–26	Cameroon	Pallati i Rinisë, Pristina; Attendance: 200; Referees: Yonchev, Yovchev (BUL)
22 June 2015; 20:15		(14–12)		Pallati i Rinisë, Pristina; Attendance: 200; Referees: Yonchev, Yovchev (BUL)
22 June 2015; 20:15		Report		Pallati i Rinisë, Pristina; Attendance: 200; Referees: Yonchev, Yovchev (BUL)

=== Group C ===
Team	Pld	W	D	L	GF	GA	GD	Pts
Moldova	3	2	1	0	120	73	+47	5
Malta	3	2	0	1	81	100	−19	4
China	3	1	1	1	93	88	+5	3
Ireland	3	0	0	3	74	107	−33	0

20 June 2015; 15:45	Moldova	43–20	Ireland	Shani Nushi, Gjakova; Attendance: 200; Referees: Ndemdou, NGASSA (CMR)
20 June 2015; 15:45		(17–10)		Shani Nushi, Gjakova; Attendance: 200; Referees: Ndemdou, NGASSA (CMR)
20 June 2015; 15:45		Report		Shani Nushi, Gjakova; Attendance: 200; Referees: Ndemdou, NGASSA (CMR)

20 June 2015; 18:00	China	28–29	Malta	Shani Nushi, Gjakova; Attendance: 200; Referees: Hollis, Le-Mon (GBR)
20 June 2015; 18:00		(14–13)		Shani Nushi, Gjakova; Attendance: 200; Referees: Hollis, Le-Mon (GBR)
20 June 2015; 18:00		Report		Shani Nushi, Gjakova; Attendance: 200; Referees: Hollis, Le-Mon (GBR)

21 June 2015; 13:30	Ireland	29–35	China	Shani Nushi, Gjakova; Attendance: 100; Referees: Hollis, Le-Mon (GBR)
21 June 2015; 13:30		(14–14)		Shani Nushi, Gjakova; Attendance: 100; Referees: Hollis, Le-Mon (GBR)
21 June 2015; 13:30		Report		Shani Nushi, Gjakova; Attendance: 100; Referees: Hollis, Le-Mon (GBR)

21 June 2015; 15:45	Malta	23–47	Moldova	Shani Nushi, Gjakova; Attendance: 100; Referees: Kulovic, Skaljic (BIH)
21 June 2015; 15:45		(10–24)		Shani Nushi, Gjakova; Attendance: 100; Referees: Kulovic, Skaljic (BIH)
21 June 2015; 15:45		Report		Shani Nushi, Gjakova; Attendance: 100; Referees: Kulovic, Skaljic (BIH)

22 June 2015; 13:30	China	30–30	Moldova	Shani Nushi, Gjakova; Attendance: 250; Referees: Ilir, Syart (KOS)
22 June 2015; 13:30		(12–14)		Shani Nushi, Gjakova; Attendance: 250; Referees: Ilir, Syart (KOS)
22 June 2015; 13:30		Report		Shani Nushi, Gjakova; Attendance: 250; Referees: Ilir, Syart (KOS)

22 June 2015; 18:00	Malta	29–25	Ireland	Shani Nushi, Gjakova; Attendance: 250; Referees: Ndemdou, NGASSA (CMR)
22 June 2015; 18:00		(17–10)		Shani Nushi, Gjakova; Attendance: 250; Referees: Ndemdou, NGASSA (CMR)
22 June 2015; 18:00		Report		Shani Nushi, Gjakova; Attendance: 250; Referees: Ndemdou, NGASSA (CMR)

=== Group D ===
Team	Pld	W	D	L	GF	GA	GD	Pts
Latvia	3	3	0	0	92	60	+32	6
Uruguay	3	2	0	1	88	53	+35	4
Bulgaria	3	1	0	2	92	67	+25	2
Andorra	3	0	0	3	34	126	−92	0

20 June 2015; 13:30	Uruguay	38–9	Andorra	Shani Nushi, Gjakova; Attendance: 200; Referees: Ilir, Syart (KOS)
20 June 2015; 13:30		(16–4)		Shani Nushi, Gjakova; Attendance: 200; Referees: Ilir, Syart (KOS)
20 June 2015; 13:30		Report		Shani Nushi, Gjakova; Attendance: 200; Referees: Ilir, Syart (KOS)

20 June 2015; 20:15	Latvia	27–25	Bulgaria	Shani Nushi, Gjakova; Attendance: 200; Referees: Kulovic, Skaljic (BIH)
20 June 2015; 20:15		(13–12)		Shani Nushi, Gjakova; Attendance: 200; Referees: Kulovic, Skaljic (BIH)
20 June 2015; 20:15		Report		Shani Nushi, Gjakova; Attendance: 200; Referees: Kulovic, Skaljic (BIH)

21 June 2015; 18:00	Bulgaria	20–28	Uruguay	Shani Nushi, Gjakova; Attendance: 100; Referees: Ilir, Syart (KOS)
21 June 2015; 18:00		(12–14)		Shani Nushi, Gjakova; Attendance: 100; Referees: Ilir, Syart (KOS)
21 June 2015; 18:00		Report		Shani Nushi, Gjakova; Attendance: 100; Referees: Ilir, Syart (KOS)

21 June 2015; 20:15	Andorra	13–41	Latvia	Shani Nushi, Gjakova; Attendance: 100; Referees: Ndemdou, NGASSA (CMR)
21 June 2015; 20:15		(7–24)		Shani Nushi, Gjakova; Attendance: 100; Referees: Ndemdou, NGASSA (CMR)
21 June 2015; 20:15		Report		Shani Nushi, Gjakova; Attendance: 100; Referees: Ndemdou, NGASSA (CMR)

22 June 2015; 15:45	Latvia	26–24	Uruguay	Shani Nushi, Gjakova; Attendance: 260; Referees: Kulovic, Skaljic (BIH)
22 June 2015; 15:45		(11–13)		Shani Nushi, Gjakova; Attendance: 260; Referees: Kulovic, Skaljic (BIH)
22 June 2015; 15:45		Report		Shani Nushi, Gjakova; Attendance: 260; Referees: Kulovic, Skaljic (BIH)

22 June 2015; 20:15	Bulgaria	47–12	Andorra	Shani Nushi, Gjakova; Attendance: 100; Referees: Hollis, Le-Mon (GBR)
22 June 2015; 20:15		(23–6)		Shani Nushi, Gjakova; Attendance: 100; Referees: Hollis, Le-Mon (GBR)
22 June 2015; 20:15		Report		Shani Nushi, Gjakova; Attendance: 100; Referees: Hollis, Le-Mon (GBR)

== Knockout stage ==
=== Championship ===
Quarterfinals
A1	Faroe Islands	26
B2	Cameroon	21
B1	Estonia	30
A2	Kosovo	31
C1	Moldova	23
D2	Uruguay	34
D1	Latvia	35
C2	Malta	14

Semifinals
A1	Faroe Islands	31
A2	Kosovo	23
D2	Uruguay	21
D1	Latvia	25

Finals
A1	Faroe Islands	27
D1	Latvia	24
Third place
A2	Kosovo	28
D2	Uruguay	16

=== 5th place bracket ===
Semifinals
B2	Cameroon	26
B1	Estonia	27
C1	Moldova	33
C2	Malta	19

5th Place
B1	Estonia	37
C1	Moldova	33
7th Place
B2	Cameroon	39
C2	Malta	13

=== 9th place bracket ===
-
A3	Australia	30
B4	Albania	22
B3	Great Britain	38
A4	Armenia	20
C3	China	39
D4	Andorra	30
D3	Bulgaria	46
C4	Ireland	26

-
A3	Australia	26
B3	Great Britain	32
C3	China	28
D3	Bulgaria	27

9th place
B3	Great Britain	28
C3	China	22
11th place
A3	Australia	35
D3	Bulgaria (PS)	36

=== 13th place bracket ===
Semifinals
B4	Albania	37
A4	Armenia	26
D4	Andorra	29
C4	Ireland	36

13th Place
B4	Albania	29
C4	Ireland	33
15th Place
A4	Armenia	15
D4	Andorra	32

==== Quarterfinals ====
24 June 2015; 12:30	Faroe Islands	26–21	Cameroon	Pallati i Rinisë, Pristina; Attendance: 200; Referees: Kulovic, Skaljic (BIH)
24 June 2015; 12:30		(13-11)		Pallati i Rinisë, Pristina; Attendance: 200; Referees: Kulovic, Skaljic (BIH)
24 June 2015; 12:30		Report		Pallati i Rinisë, Pristina; Attendance: 200; Referees: Kulovic, Skaljic (BIH)

24 June 2015; 15:00	Moldova	23–34	Uruguay	Pallati i Rinisë, Pristina; Attendance: 100; Referees: Yonchev, Yovchev (BUL)
24 June 2015; 15:00		(13-18)		Pallati i Rinisë, Pristina; Attendance: 100; Referees: Yonchev, Yovchev (BUL)
24 June 2015; 15:00		Report		Pallati i Rinisë, Pristina; Attendance: 100; Referees: Yonchev, Yovchev (BUL)

24 June 2015; 17:30	Estonia	30–31	Kosovo	Pallati i Rinisë, Pristina; Attendance: 1,800; Referees: Leitis, Persis (LAT)
24 June 2015; 17:30		(14-17)		Pallati i Rinisë, Pristina; Attendance: 1,800; Referees: Leitis, Persis (LAT)
24 June 2015; 17:30		Report		Pallati i Rinisë, Pristina; Attendance: 1,800; Referees: Leitis, Persis (LAT)

24 June 2015; 20:00	Latvia	35–14	Malta	Pallati i Rinisë, Pristina; Attendance: 100; Referees: Yunlei, Yufeng (CHN)
24 June 2015; 20:00		(17-8)		Pallati i Rinisë, Pristina; Attendance: 100; Referees: Yunlei, Yufeng (CHN)
24 June 2015; 20:00		Report		Pallati i Rinisë, Pristina; Attendance: 100; Referees: Yunlei, Yufeng (CHN)

==== Semifinals ====
25 June 2015; 17:30	Faroe Islands	31–23	Kosovo	Pallati i Rinisë, Pristina; Attendance: 2,200; Referees: Kulovic, Skaljic (BIH)
25 June 2015; 17:30		(17-15)		Pallati i Rinisë, Pristina; Attendance: 2,200; Referees: Kulovic, Skaljic (BIH)
25 June 2015; 17:30		Report		Pallati i Rinisë, Pristina; Attendance: 2,200; Referees: Kulovic, Skaljic (BIH)

25 June 2015; 20:00	Uruguay	21–25	Latvia	Pallati i Rinisë, Pristina; Attendance: 200; Referees: Yonchev, Yovchev (BUL)
25 June 2015; 20:00		(10-11)		Pallati i Rinisë, Pristina; Attendance: 200; Referees: Yonchev, Yovchev (BUL)
25 June 2015; 20:00		Report		Pallati i Rinisë, Pristina; Attendance: 200; Referees: Yonchev, Yovchev (BUL)

==== Third place game ====
26 June 2015	Kosovo	28–16	Uruguay	Pallati i Rinisë, Pristina; Attendance: 600; Referees: Leitis, Persis (LAT)
26 June 2015		(15-8)		Pallati i Rinisë, Pristina; Attendance: 600; Referees: Leitis, Persis (LAT)
26 June 2015		Report		Pallati i Rinisë, Pristina; Attendance: 600; Referees: Leitis, Persis (LAT)

==== Final ====
26 June 2015	Faroe Islands	27–24	Latvia	Pallati i Rinisë, Pristina; Attendance: 1000; Referees: Kulovic, Skaljic (BIH)
26 June 2015		(13-12)		Pallati i Rinisë, Pristina; Attendance: 1000; Referees: Kulovic, Skaljic (BIH)
26 June 2015		Report		Pallati i Rinisë, Pristina; Attendance: 1000; Referees: Kulovic, Skaljic (BIH)

== Final ranking ==
Rank	Team
Gold medal	Faroe Islands
Silver medal	Latvia
Bronze medal	Kosovo
4	Uruguay
5	Estonia
6	Moldova
7	Cameroon
8	Malta
9	Great Britain
10	China
11	Bulgaria
12	Australia
13	Ireland
14	Albania
15	Andorra
16	Armenia

2015 Emerging Nations Championship Winners

Faroe Islands
First title

Team Roster: Mikkjal Hansen, Bartal T. Kamban, Bogi Gaard Davidsen, Rókur Rasmusen, Hans Eli Sigurbjørnsson, Rúni Højgaard, Kjartan Johansen, Jóannes Prestá, Áki Egilsnes, Allan Norðberg, Andreas Eriksen, Tróndur Kragesteen, Rókur Akralíð, Tony Hammer Weyhe, .
Team Officials: Kári Nielsen, Birgir Hansen, Jákup Duruus.

== Awards ==
- MVP: (Faroe Islands) Tróndur Kragesteen
- Goalkeeper: (Cameroon) Isaac Junior Fonsho
- Left Wing: (Faroe Islands) Rosing Rasmussen
- Right Wing: (Estonia) Karl Roosna
- Center: (Kosovo) Kreshnik Krasniqi kosovo
- Left Back: (Latvia) Raimonds Trifanovs
- Right Back: (Faroe Islands) Áki Egilsnes
- Pivot: (Kosovo) Jupa Kastriot
- Top Goal Scorer: (Bulgaria) Svetlin Dimitrov

== Media coverage ==
RTV21 streams all Kosovo matches and both final and 3rd place matches.

Country / Region	Broadcaster
Kosovo	RTV21

== See also ==
- 2015 World Men's Handball Championship
