= 2026 European Men's Handball Championship qualification =

This article describes the qualification process for the 2026 European Men's Handball Championship and EHF Euro Cup.

== Format ==
Prior to the qualification, four teams were automatically qualified:

- Denmark, Norway and Sweden as co-hosts;
- The best-placed team from the 2024 European Men's Handball Championship, other than the 2026 tournament co-hosts.

The remaining eligible teams contested a qualification tournament to determine the teams securing the remaining 20 places in the final tournament. The qualification tournament consisted of three rounds: qualification phase 1, promotion round, and qualification phase 2.

- Qualification phase 1:
  - Four teams;
  - Round-robin tournament format;
  - Top-ranked team after all matches played advanced to the promotion round.
- Promotion round:
  - Six teams:
    - Qualification phase 1 winner,
    - Four of the lowest-ranked fourth-placed teams of the previous cycle qualifiers round,
    - Best European team at the 2023 IHF Emerging Nations Championship;
  - Two-legged tie format;
  - Three aggregate winners advanced to the qualification phase 2.
- Qualification phase 2:
  - Thirty-two teams:
    - Three promotion round winners
    - Remaining eight teams eliminated in the previous cycle qualifiers round
    - Twenty teams that participated in the 2024 European Championship, but did not qualify directly to the 2026 final tournament
  - Round-robin tournament format: eight groups of four teams;
  - Group winners, group runners-up, and the four best third-placed teams qualified for the final tournament.

== Qualification Phase 1 ==
Since only four teams participate in this round, no draw was needed, other than the hosting rights. Although Cyprus had the hosting rights, it declined and the rights moved to Azerbaijan.

=== Standings ===
Pos	Team	Pld	W	D	L	GF	GA	GD	Pts	Qualification
1	Great Britain	3	2	1	0	108	61	+47	5 (Note: Cyprus 25–25 Great Britain)	Promotion round
2	Cyprus	3	2	1	0	104	74	+30	5	
3	Azerbaijan (H)	3	1	0	2	79	96	−17	2	
4	Malta	3	0	0	3	65	125	−60	0	

Source: EHF
Rules for classification: 1) points; 2) head-to-head points; 3) head-to-head goal difference; 4) head-to-head number of goals scored; 5) goal difference.
(H) Hosts

=== Results ===
All times are local (UTC+4).

13 January 2023; 14:45	Cyprus	25–25	Great Britain	Baku Sports Palace, Baku; Attendance: 600; Referees: Yonchev, Yovchev (BUL)
13 January 2023; 14:45	C. Argyrou, Dimosthenous 6	(12–13)	Edgar 10	Baku Sports Palace, Baku; Attendance: 600; Referees: Yonchev, Yovchev (BUL)
13 January 2023; 14:45	2× (yellow card) 4× (suspension)	Report	1× (yellow card) 2× (suspension)	Baku Sports Palace, Baku; Attendance: 600; Referees: Yonchev, Yovchev (BUL)

13 January 2023; 17:00	Azerbaijan	34–25	Malta	Baku Sports Palace, Baku; Attendance: 2,200; Referees: Peretz, Schwartz (ISR)
13 January 2023; 17:00	Muradov 9	(18–6)	Gruppetta, Naudi 5	Baku Sports Palace, Baku; Attendance: 2,200; Referees: Peretz, Schwartz (ISR)
13 January 2023; 17:00	1× (yellow card) 2× (suspension)	Report	1× (yellow card) 3× (suspension)	Baku Sports Palace, Baku; Attendance: 2,200; Referees: Peretz, Schwartz (ISR)

14 January 2023; 14:45	Malta	26–47	Cyprus	Baku Sports Palace, Baku; Attendance: 500; Referees: Peretz, Schwartz (ISR)
14 January 2023; 14:45	Seifert 6	(12–23)	C. Argyrou 9	Baku Sports Palace, Baku; Attendance: 500; Referees: Peretz, Schwartz (ISR)
14 January 2023; 14:45	5× (suspension)	Report	2× (yellow card) 4× (suspension)	Baku Sports Palace, Baku; Attendance: 500; Referees: Peretz, Schwartz (ISR)

14 January 2023; 17:00	Great Britain	39–22	Azerbaijan	Baku Sports Palace, Baku; Attendance: 2,100; Referees: Yonchev, Yovchev (BUL)
14 January 2023; 17:00	White 11	(16–8)	Georgiyevski 9	Baku Sports Palace, Baku; Attendance: 2,100; Referees: Yonchev, Yovchev (BUL)
14 January 2023; 17:00	1× (yellow card) 1× (suspension)	Report	1× (yellow card) 2× (suspension)	Baku Sports Palace, Baku; Attendance: 2,100; Referees: Yonchev, Yovchev (BUL)

15 January 2023; 12:45	Great Britain	44–14	Malta	Baku Sports Palace, Baku; Attendance: 450; Referees: Peretz, Schwartz (ISR)
15 January 2023; 12:45	Pereira 17	(23–7)	Mercieca 4	Baku Sports Palace, Baku; Attendance: 450; Referees: Peretz, Schwartz (ISR)
15 January 2023; 12:45	2× (yellow card) 2× (suspension)	Report	1× (suspension)	Baku Sports Palace, Baku; Attendance: 450; Referees: Peretz, Schwartz (ISR)

15 January 2023; 15:00	Cyprus	32–23	Azerbaijan	Baku Sports Palace, Baku; Attendance: 1,700; Referees: Yonchev, Yovchev (BUL)
15 January 2023; 15:00	Dimosthenous 8	(18–15)	Mammadov 9	Baku Sports Palace, Baku; Attendance: 1,700; Referees: Yonchev, Yovchev (BUL)
15 January 2023; 15:00	2× (yellow card) 1× (suspension)	Report	1× (yellow card) 4× (suspension)	Baku Sports Palace, Baku; Attendance: 1,700; Referees: Yonchev, Yovchev (BUL)

== Promotion round ==
Six teams participated in this round: the winner of the Phase 1, the four of the lowest-ranked fourth-ranked teams in the 2024 European Men's Handball Championship qualification and the best European team of the 2023 IHF Emerging Nations Championship. The draw took place on 5 July 2023, in Vienna, Austria.

=== Participating teams ===
Qualification method	Team(s)
Winner of Qualification Phase 1	Great Britain
Four of the lowest-ranked fourth-ranked teams in the Men's EHF EURO 2024 Qualifiers	Belgium; Kosovo; Luxembourg; Latvia
Best European team at the 2023 IHF Emerging Nations Championship	Cyprus

=== Seeding ===
The seeding was announced on 4 July 2023.

Pot 1	Pot 2
Belgium; Kosovo; Luxembourg	Latvia; Great Britain; Cyprus

=== Overview ===
Times from November to March are UTC+1, Times in May are UTC+2.

Team 1	Agg.	Team 2	1st leg	2nd leg
Latvia	60–61	Luxembourg	32–25	28–36
Kosovo	59–45	Great Britain	30–22	29–23
Belgium	66–40	Cyprus	30–18	36–22

==== Matches ====
11 January 2024; 18:40	Latvia	32–25	Luxembourg	Valmiera Olympic Center, Valmiera; Attendance: 480; Referees: Leszczyński, Piechota (POL)
11 January 2024; 18:40	Juzups 8	(13–13)	three players 5	Valmiera Olympic Center, Valmiera; Attendance: 480; Referees: Leszczyński, Piechota (POL)
11 January 2024; 18:40	1× (yellow card) 4× (suspension) 1× (red card)	Report	8× (suspension) 1× (red card)	Valmiera Olympic Center, Valmiera; Attendance: 480; Referees: Leszczyński, Piechota (POL)

14 January 2024; 16:00	Luxembourg	36–28	Latvia	d'Coque, Luxembourg City; Attendance: 1,172; Referees: Caçador, Nicolau (POR)
14 January 2024; 16:00	Hoffmann 9	(21–13)	Geislers 9	d'Coque, Luxembourg City; Attendance: 1,172; Referees: Caçador, Nicolau (POR)
14 January 2024; 16:00	4× (suspension)	Report	1× (yellow card) 2× (suspension)	d'Coque, Luxembourg City; Attendance: 1,172; Referees: Caçador, Nicolau (POR)

Luxembourg won 61–60 on aggregate.

10 January 2024; 20:30	Kosovo	30–22	Great Britain	Palace of Youth and Sports, Pristina; Attendance: 1,150; Referees: Erdoğan, Özdeniz (TUR)
10 January 2024; 20:30	Dedaj 11	(13–11)	Edgar 6	Palace of Youth and Sports, Pristina; Attendance: 1,150; Referees: Erdoğan, Özdeniz (TUR)
10 January 2024; 20:30	5× (suspension)	Report	5× (suspension)	Palace of Youth and Sports, Pristina; Attendance: 1,150; Referees: Erdoğan, Özdeniz (TUR)

13 January 2024; 14:15	Great Britain	23–29	Kosovo	Derby Arena, Derby; Attendance: 1,200; Referees: Horváth, Marton (HUN)
13 January 2024; 14:15	Plumridge, Wardle 4	(11–13)	Dedaj 8	Derby Arena, Derby; Attendance: 1,200; Referees: Horváth, Marton (HUN)
13 January 2024; 14:15	1× (yellow card) 4× (suspension)	Report	1× (yellow card) 6× (suspension) 1× (red card)	Derby Arena, Derby; Attendance: 1,200; Referees: Horváth, Marton (HUN)

Kosovo won 59–45 on aggregate.

10 January 2024; 18:00	Belgium	30–18	Cyprus	Sporthal Alverberg, Hasselt; Attendance: 1,970; Referees: Madsen, Mortensen (DEN)
10 January 2024; 18:00	Glorieux 7	(12–10)	three players 4	Sporthal Alverberg, Hasselt; Attendance: 1,970; Referees: Madsen, Mortensen (DEN)
10 January 2024; 18:00	1× (yellow card) 2× (suspension)	Report	2× (suspension)	Sporthal Alverberg, Hasselt; Attendance: 1,970; Referees: Madsen, Mortensen (DEN)

13 January 2024; 16:00	Cyprus	22–36	Belgium	Eleftheria Indoor Hall, Nicosia; Attendance: 200; Referees: Boričić, Marković (SRB)
13 January 2024; 16:00	Argyrou 7	(8–15)	Cadel 6	Eleftheria Indoor Hall, Nicosia; Attendance: 200; Referees: Boričić, Marković (SRB)
13 January 2024; 16:00	1× (yellow card) 4× (suspension)	Report	1× (yellow card) 5× (suspension)	Eleftheria Indoor Hall, Nicosia; Attendance: 200; Referees: Boričić, Marković (SRB)

Belgium won 66–40 on aggregate.

== Qualification Phase 2 ==
Phase 2 was played between November 2024 and May 2025. Like in previous cycles, 32 teams were divided into eight groups of four, to be played as round-robin tournaments. The eight group winners and runners-up qualified for the final tournament, together with the four best third-placed teams, which were determined taking into account only results against top two teams in each group. The draw took place on 21 March 2024 in Copenhagen, Denmark.

=== Participating teams ===
Qualification method	Team(s)
Participated in the 2024 European Championship	Germany; Hungary; Slovenia; Portugal; Austria; Iceland; Croatia; Netherlands; Spain; Montenegro; Czech Republic; Poland; North Macedonia; Georgia; Serbia; Faroe Islands; Switzerland; Romania; Greece; Bosnia and Herzegovina
Eliminated in Qualification Phase 2 for the 2024 European Championship	Estonia; Turkey; Italy; Slovakia; Ukraine; Finland; Israel; Lithuania
Promotion round winners	Belgium; Kosovo; Luxembourg
Promotion round best loser	Latvia ^{1}

^{1} Following another motion, submitted by the competitions department and confirmed by the EXEC, Latvia, as the best-ranked team not yet qualified, received a place in the Men's EHF EURO 2026 Qualifiers Phase 2. This one place was open due to the non-admittance of Russia and Belarus.

==== Seeding ====
The seeding was announced on 21 February 2024.

Pot 1	Pot 2	Pot 3	Pot 4
Germany; Spain; Hungary; Croatia; Iceland; Slovenia; Portugal; Netherlands	Austria; Montenegro; Serbia; Poland; Czech Republic; North Macedonia; Faroe Islands; Greece	Bosnia and Herzegovina; Slovakia; Belgium; Switzerland; Romania; Lithuania; Ukraine; Italy	Finland; Israel; Estonia; Georgia; Turkey; Luxembourg; Kosovo; Latvia

=== Groups ===
Times from November to March are UTC+1, Times in May are UTC+2.

==== Group 1 ====
Pos	Team	Pld	W	D	L	GF	GA	GD	Pts	Qualification
1	Slovenia	6	6	0	0	202	164	+38	12	Final tournament
2	North Macedonia	6	3	0	3	179	166	+13	6 (Note: North Macedonia 53–46 Lithuania)	Final tournament
3	Lithuania	6	3	0	3	164	168	−4	6	
4	Estonia	6	0	0	6	156	203	−47	0	

Source: EHF
Rules for classification: 1) points; 2) head-to-head points; 3) head-to-head goal difference; 4) head-to-head number of goals scored; 5) goal difference.
Notes:

6 November 2024; 20:00	North Macedonia	37–33	Estonia	Boris Trajkovski Sports Center, Skopje; Attendance: 4,700; Referees: Andorka, Hucker (HUN)
6 November 2024; 20:00	Serafimov 10	(20–20)	Toom 11	Boris Trajkovski Sports Center, Skopje; Attendance: 4,700; Referees: Andorka, Hucker (HUN)
6 November 2024; 20:00	2× (suspension)	Report	2× (yellow card) 6× (suspension)	Boris Trajkovski Sports Center, Skopje; Attendance: 4,700; Referees: Andorka, Hucker (HUN)

7 November 2024; 18:00	Slovenia	36–25	Lithuania	Rdeča dvorana, Velenje; Attendance: 1,100; Referees: Hofer, Schmidhuber (AUT)
7 November 2024; 18:00	Makuc, Vlah 7	(17–15)	Dumčius, Malašinskas 5	Rdeča dvorana, Velenje; Attendance: 1,100; Referees: Hofer, Schmidhuber (AUT)
7 November 2024; 18:00	4× (suspension)	Report	5× (suspension)	Rdeča dvorana, Velenje; Attendance: 1,100; Referees: Hofer, Schmidhuber (AUT)

10 November 2024; 17:00	Estonia	28–29	Slovenia	Kalev Sports Hall, Tallinn; Attendance: 800; Referees: Mandák, Rudinský (SVK)
10 November 2024; 17:00	Varul 9	(14–14)	Makuc 13	Kalev Sports Hall, Tallinn; Attendance: 800; Referees: Mandák, Rudinský (SVK)
10 November 2024; 17:00	1× (yellow card) 6× (suspension)	Report	5× (suspension)	Kalev Sports Hall, Tallinn; Attendance: 800; Referees: Mandák, Rudinský (SVK)

10 November 2024; 17:00	Lithuania	29–27	North Macedonia	Twinsbet Arena, Vilnius; Attendance: 1,500; Referees: Budzák, Záhradník (SVK)
10 November 2024; 17:00	Malašinskas 8	(13–12)	Kuzmanovski 8	Twinsbet Arena, Vilnius; Attendance: 1,500; Referees: Budzák, Záhradník (SVK)
10 November 2024; 17:00	1× (yellow card) 4× (suspension)	Report	2× (yellow card) 3× (suspension)	Twinsbet Arena, Vilnius; Attendance: 1,500; Referees: Budzák, Záhradník (SVK)

12 March 2025; 18:00	Estonia	20–30	Lithuania	Kalev Sports Hall, Tallinn; Attendance: 800; Referees: Pétursson, Þrastarson (ISL)
12 March 2025; 18:00	Jaanimaa 6	(10–17)	Malašinskas 6	Kalev Sports Hall, Tallinn; Attendance: 800; Referees: Pétursson, Þrastarson (ISL)
12 March 2025; 18:00	1× (yellow card) 4× (suspension)	Report	2× (yellow card) 6× (suspension)	Kalev Sports Hall, Tallinn; Attendance: 800; Referees: Pétursson, Þrastarson (ISL)

12 March 2025; 20:00	North Macedonia	26–32	Slovenia	Boris Trajkovski Sports Center, Skopje; Attendance: 6,963; Referees: A. Konjičanin, D. Konjičanin (BIH)
12 March 2025; 20:00	Kuzmanovski 10	(16–15)	Vlah 10	Boris Trajkovski Sports Center, Skopje; Attendance: 6,963; Referees: A. Konjičanin, D. Konjičanin (BIH)
12 March 2025; 20:00	2× (suspension) 1× (red card)	Report	1× (yellow card) 4× (suspension)	Boris Trajkovski Sports Center, Skopje; Attendance: 6,963; Referees: A. Konjičanin, D. Konjičanin (BIH)

16 March 2025; 15:00	Lithuania	35–28	Estonia	Švyturys Arena, Klaipėda; Attendance: 1,250; Referees: Fotakidis, Kinatzidis (GRE)
16 March 2025; 15:00	Antanavičius 8	(15–11)	Löpp 5	Švyturys Arena, Klaipėda; Attendance: 1,250; Referees: Fotakidis, Kinatzidis (GRE)
16 March 2025; 15:00	5× (suspension)	Report	1× (yellow card) 3× (suspension)	Švyturys Arena, Klaipėda; Attendance: 1,250; Referees: Fotakidis, Kinatzidis (GRE)

16 March 2025; 18:30	Slovenia	38–27	North Macedonia	Arena Bonifika, Koper; Attendance: 3,410; Referees: Bíró, Kiss (HUN)
16 March 2025; 18:30	Vlah 9	(20–12)	Kuzmanovski 6	Arena Bonifika, Koper; Attendance: 3,410; Referees: Bíró, Kiss (HUN)
16 March 2025; 18:30	3× (suspension)	Report	3× (suspension)	Arena Bonifika, Koper; Attendance: 3,410; Referees: Bíró, Kiss (HUN)

7 May 2025; 18:00	Lithuania	28–31	Slovenia	Twinsbet Arena, Vilnius; Attendance: 2,000; Referees: Stark, Ştefan (ROU)
7 May 2025; 18:00	Dumčius, Malašinskas 6	(12–18)	Cokan, Mlivić 6	Twinsbet Arena, Vilnius; Attendance: 2,000; Referees: Stark, Ştefan (ROU)
7 May 2025; 18:00	3× (suspension)	Report	1× (yellow card) 3× (suspension)	Twinsbet Arena, Vilnius; Attendance: 2,000; Referees: Stark, Ştefan (ROU)

8 May 2025; 18:00	Estonia	17–36	North Macedonia	Kalev Sports Hall, Tallinn; Attendance: 500; Referees: Maia, Nunes (POR)
8 May 2025; 18:00	Jaanimaa 5	(10–19)	Kuzmanovski 6	Kalev Sports Hall, Tallinn; Attendance: 500; Referees: Maia, Nunes (POR)
8 May 2025; 18:00	2× (suspension) 1× (red card)	Report	6× (suspension)	Kalev Sports Hall, Tallinn; Attendance: 500; Referees: Maia, Nunes (POR)

11 May 2025; 18:00	Slovenia	36–30	Estonia	Golovec Hall, Celje; Attendance: 1,800; Referees: Panetta, Riello (ITA)
11 May 2025; 18:00	Cokan, Knavs 5	(20–15)	Jaanimaa 12	Golovec Hall, Celje; Attendance: 1,800; Referees: Panetta, Riello (ITA)
11 May 2025; 18:00	1× (suspension)	Report	4× (suspension)	Golovec Hall, Celje; Attendance: 1,800; Referees: Panetta, Riello (ITA)

11 May 2025; 18:00	North Macedonia	26–17	Lithuania	Jane Sandanski Arena, Skopje; Attendance: 5,000; Referees: P. Geraets, R. Geraets (NED)
11 May 2025; 18:00	Kuzmanovski, Serafimov 5	(13–11)	Antanavičius 8	Jane Sandanski Arena, Skopje; Attendance: 5,000; Referees: P. Geraets, R. Geraets (NED)
11 May 2025; 18:00	1× (yellow card) 3× (suspension)	Report	1× (yellow card) 3× (suspension)	Jane Sandanski Arena, Skopje; Attendance: 5,000; Referees: P. Geraets, R. Geraets (NED)

==== Group 2 ====
Pos	Team	Pld	W	D	L	GF	GA	GD	Pts	Qualification
1	Hungary	6	5	1	0	203	158	+45	11	Final tournament
2	Montenegro	6	4	1	1	188	177	+11	9	Final tournament
3	Finland	6	2	0	4	151	177	−26	4	
4	Slovakia	6	0	0	6	165	195	−30	0	

Source: EHF
Rules for classification: 1) points; 2) head-to-head points; 3) head-to-head goal difference; 4) head-to-head number of goals scored; 5) goal difference.

6 November 2024; 18:00	Montenegro	29–28	Finland	Bemax Arena, Podgorica; Attendance: 2,245; Referees: Erdoğan, Özdeniz (TUR)
6 November 2024; 18:00	Čepić, Vujović 7	(16–15)	Laine, Vainionpää 6	Bemax Arena, Podgorica; Attendance: 2,245; Referees: Erdoğan, Özdeniz (TUR)
6 November 2024; 18:00	3× (suspension)	Report	3× (suspension)	Bemax Arena, Podgorica; Attendance: 2,245; Referees: Erdoğan, Özdeniz (TUR)

6 November 2024; 19:00	Hungary	37–32	Slovakia	Audi Aréna, Győr; Attendance: 1,800; Referees: Laron, Lindenbaum (ISR)
6 November 2024; 19:00	Imre 9	(15–12)	Macháč 6	Audi Aréna, Győr; Attendance: 1,800; Referees: Laron, Lindenbaum (ISR)
6 November 2024; 19:00	5× (suspension)	Report	4× (suspension)	Audi Aréna, Győr; Attendance: 1,800; Referees: Laron, Lindenbaum (ISR)

10 November 2024; 15:00	Finland	23–32	Hungary	Energia Areena, Vantaa; Attendance: 1,500; Referees: Kurtagic, Wetterwik (SWE)
10 November 2024; 15:00	Hjálmarsson 5	(8–17)	Rosta 7	Energia Areena, Vantaa; Attendance: 1,500; Referees: Kurtagic, Wetterwik (SWE)
10 November 2024; 15:00	3× (suspension)	Report	1× (suspension)	Energia Areena, Vantaa; Attendance: 1,500; Referees: Kurtagic, Wetterwik (SWE)

10 November 2024; 17:00	Slovakia	35–38	Montenegro	Steel Arena, Košice; Attendance: 3,000; Referees: R. Thiyagarajah, S. Thiyagarajah (GER)
10 November 2024; 17:00	Prokop 8	(18–21)	Čepić 9	Steel Arena, Košice; Attendance: 3,000; Referees: R. Thiyagarajah, S. Thiyagarajah (GER)
10 November 2024; 17:00	4× (suspension)	Report	4× (suspension)	Steel Arena, Košice; Attendance: 3,000; Referees: R. Thiyagarajah, S. Thiyagarajah (GER)

12 March 2025; 18:00	Montenegro	26–29	Hungary	Morača Sports Center, Podgorica; Attendance: 5,000; Referees: Leszczyński, Piechota (POL)
12 March 2025; 18:00	Vujović 6	(12–14)	Rosta 9	Morača Sports Center, Podgorica; Attendance: 5,000; Referees: Leszczyński, Piechota (POL)
12 March 2025; 18:00	1× (yellow card) 2× (suspension) 1× (red card)	Report	2× (suspension)	Morača Sports Center, Podgorica; Attendance: 5,000; Referees: Leszczyński, Piechota (POL)

13 March 2025; 17:15	Finland	22–21	Slovakia	Energia Areena, Vantaa; Attendance: 2,000; Referees: Fahner, Kubis (POL)
13 March 2025; 17:15	Henriksson 5	(12–12)	Antl 6	Energia Areena, Vantaa; Attendance: 2,000; Referees: Fahner, Kubis (POL)
13 March 2025; 17:15	1× (yellow card) 4× (suspension)	Report	2× (yellow card) 4× (suspension)	Energia Areena, Vantaa; Attendance: 2,000; Referees: Fahner, Kubis (POL)

16 March 2025; 16:00	Slovakia	25–26	Finland	Sportová Hala Na Zábran, Hlohovec; Attendance: 1,850; Referees: Serdiuc, Sirbu (MDA)
16 March 2025; 16:00	Antl 10	(15–14)	Helander 9	Sportová Hala Na Zábran, Hlohovec; Attendance: 1,850; Referees: Serdiuc, Sirbu (MDA)
16 March 2025; 16:00	1× (yellow card) 5× (suspension)	Report	1× (suspension) 1× (red card)	Sportová Hala Na Zábran, Hlohovec; Attendance: 1,850; Referees: Serdiuc, Sirbu (MDA)

16 March 2025; 17:30	Hungary	29–29	Montenegro	Tatabányai Multifunkcionális Sportcsarnok, Tatabánya; Attendance: 5,517; Referees: Mikelić, Parađina (CRO)
16 March 2025; 17:30	Bánhidi 6	(17–14)	Vujović 8	Tatabányai Multifunkcionális Sportcsarnok, Tatabánya; Attendance: 5,517; Referees: Mikelić, Parađina (CRO)
16 March 2025; 17:30	1× (yellow card) 2× (suspension)	Report	3× (suspension)	Tatabányai Multifunkcionális Sportcsarnok, Tatabánya; Attendance: 5,517; Referees: Mikelić, Parađina (CRO)

7 May 2025; 18:00	Slovakia	24–39	Hungary	Sportová Hala Na Zábran, Hlohovec; Attendance: 1,000; Referees: A. Vitaku, E. Vitaku (KOS)
7 May 2025; 18:00	Prokop 7	(15–20)	Imre, Papp 5	Sportová Hala Na Zábran, Hlohovec; Attendance: 1,000; Referees: A. Vitaku, E. Vitaku (KOS)
7 May 2025; 18:00	4× (suspension) 1× (red card)	Report	2× (suspension)	Sportová Hala Na Zábran, Hlohovec; Attendance: 1,000; Referees: A. Vitaku, E. Vitaku (KOS)

8 May 2025; 17:30	Finland	28–33	Montenegro	Energia Areena, Vantaa; Attendance: 2,550; Referees: Carmaux, Mursch (FRA)
8 May 2025; 17:30	Vainionpää 8	(12–19)	Vujović 7	Energia Areena, Vantaa; Attendance: 2,550; Referees: Carmaux, Mursch (FRA)
8 May 2025; 17:30	4× (suspension)	Report	1× (yellow card) 2× (suspension)	Energia Areena, Vantaa; Attendance: 2,550; Referees: Carmaux, Mursch (FRA)

11 May 2025; 18:00	Hungary	37–24	Finland	Kanizsa Aréna, Nagykanizsa; Attendance: 2,957; Referees: Álvarez, Soria (ESP)
11 May 2025; 18:00	Imre 8	(19–14)	Helander 8	Kanizsa Aréna, Nagykanizsa; Attendance: 2,957; Referees: Álvarez, Soria (ESP)
11 May 2025; 18:00	1× (suspension)	Report	4× (suspension)	Kanizsa Aréna, Nagykanizsa; Attendance: 2,957; Referees: Álvarez, Soria (ESP)

11 May 2025; 18:00	Montenegro	33–28	Slovakia	Topolica Sport Hall, Bar; Attendance: 1,500; Referees: Bolic, Hurich (AUT)
11 May 2025; 18:00	Vujačić 10	(18–13)	Prokop 6	Topolica Sport Hall, Bar; Attendance: 1,500; Referees: Bolic, Hurich (AUT)
11 May 2025; 18:00	2× (suspension)	Report	3× (suspension) 1× (red card)	Topolica Sport Hall, Bar; Attendance: 1,500; Referees: Bolic, Hurich (AUT)

==== Group 3 ====
Pos	Team	Pld	W	D	L	GF	GA	GD	Pts	Qualification
1	Iceland	6	6	0	0	196	143	+53	12	Final tournament
2	Georgia	6	3	0	3	151	162	−11	6	Final tournament
3	Greece	6	2	0	4	151	168	−17	4	
4	Bosnia and Herzegovina	6	1	0	5	143	168	−25	2	

Source: EHF
Rules for classification: 1) points; 2) head-to-head points; 3) head-to-head goal difference; 4) head-to-head number of goals scored; 5) goal difference.

6 November 2024; 16:30	Greece	27–26	Georgia	Tasos Kampouris Kanithou Indoor Hall, Chalcis; Attendance: 1,000; Referees: Pavićević, Ražnatović (MNE)
6 November 2024; 16:30	Liapis, Toskas 7	(12–13)	Tskhovrebadze 11	Tasos Kampouris Kanithou Indoor Hall, Chalcis; Attendance: 1,000; Referees: Pavićević, Ražnatović (MNE)
6 November 2024; 16:30	2× (suspension)	Report	4× (suspension)	Tasos Kampouris Kanithou Indoor Hall, Chalcis; Attendance: 1,000; Referees: Pavićević, Ražnatović (MNE)

6 November 2024; 20:30	Iceland	32–26	Bosnia and Herzegovina	Laugardalshöll, Reykjavík; Attendance: 2,200; Referees: Martens (BEL), Schols ( NED)
6 November 2024; 20:30	Gunnarsson 8	(12–12)	Periċ 7	Laugardalshöll, Reykjavík; Attendance: 2,200; Referees: Martens (BEL), Schols ( NED)
6 November 2024; 20:30	1× (yellow card) 3× (suspension)	Report	2× (yellow card) 3× (suspension) 1× (red card)	Laugardalshöll, Reykjavík; Attendance: 2,200; Referees: Martens (BEL), Schols ( NED)

10 November 2024; 15:00	Georgia	25–30	Iceland	Tbilisi Sports Palace, Tbilisi; Attendance: 3,000; Referees: Mitrevski, Todorovski (MKD)
10 November 2024; 15:00	Dikhaminjia 9	(13–14)	Magnússon 7	Tbilisi Sports Palace, Tbilisi; Attendance: 3,000; Referees: Mitrevski, Todorovski (MKD)
10 November 2024; 15:00	1× (yellow card) 1× (suspension)	Report	2× (yellow card) 2× (suspension) 1× (red card)	Tbilisi Sports Palace, Tbilisi; Attendance: 3,000; Referees: Mitrevski, Todorovski (MKD)

10 November 2024; 19:00	Bosnia and Herzegovina	23–22	Greece	Sports Hall Cazin, Cazin; Attendance: 2,000; Referees: Hansen, Madsen (DEN)
10 November 2024; 19:00	Grgić 7	(13–11)	Tziras 7	Sports Hall Cazin, Cazin; Attendance: 2,000; Referees: Hansen, Madsen (DEN)
10 November 2024; 19:00	2× (yellow card) 5× (suspension)	Report	1× (yellow card) 1× (suspension) 1× (red card)	Sports Hall Cazin, Cazin; Attendance: 2,000; Referees: Hansen, Madsen (DEN)

12 March 2025; 18:00	Greece	25–34	Iceland	Tasos Kampouris Kanithou Indoor Hall, Chalcis; Attendance: 1,250; Referees: Mandák, Rudinský (SVK)
12 March 2025; 18:00	Toskas 9	(9–19)	Kristjánsson, Ríkharðsson 6	Tasos Kampouris Kanithou Indoor Hall, Chalcis; Attendance: 1,250; Referees: Mandák, Rudinský (SVK)
12 March 2025; 18:00	2× (suspension)	Report	4× (suspension)	Tasos Kampouris Kanithou Indoor Hall, Chalcis; Attendance: 1,250; Referees: Mandák, Rudinský (SVK)

13 March 2025; 15:00	Georgia	28–26	Bosnia and Herzegovina	Tbilisi Sports Palace, Tbilisi; Attendance: 2,850; Referees: Bolic, Hurich (AUT)
13 March 2025; 15:00	Tskhovrebadze 11	(15–14)	Grgić 10	Tbilisi Sports Palace, Tbilisi; Attendance: 2,850; Referees: Bolic, Hurich (AUT)
13 March 2025; 15:00	1× (yellow card) 4× (suspension)	Report	3× (suspension)	Tbilisi Sports Palace, Tbilisi; Attendance: 2,850; Referees: Bolic, Hurich (AUT)

15 March 2025; 17:00	Iceland	33–21	Greece	Laugardalshöll, Reykjavík; Attendance: 2,100; Referees: Brkic, Jusufhodzic (AUT)
15 March 2025; 17:00	Rúnarsson, Smárason 4	(16–9)	Tziras 6	Laugardalshöll, Reykjavík; Attendance: 2,100; Referees: Brkic, Jusufhodzic (AUT)
15 March 2025; 17:00	1× (yellow card) 5× (suspension)	Report	1× (yellow card) 4× (suspension)	Laugardalshöll, Reykjavík; Attendance: 2,100; Referees: Brkic, Jusufhodzic (AUT)

16 March 2025; 20:00	Bosnia and Herzegovina	20–22	Georgia	Sports Hall Cazin, Cazin; Attendance: 1,800; Referees: Andorka, Hucker (HUN)
16 March 2025; 20:00	Grgić 6	(10–12)	Orjonikidze 6	Sports Hall Cazin, Cazin; Attendance: 1,800; Referees: Andorka, Hucker (HUN)
16 March 2025; 20:00	1× (yellow card) 1× (suspension)	Report	2× (yellow card) 1× (suspension)	Sports Hall Cazin, Cazin; Attendance: 1,800; Referees: Andorka, Hucker (HUN)

7 May 2025; 20:00	Bosnia and Herzegovina	25–34	Iceland	Mirza Delibašić Hall, Sarajevo; Attendance: 1,150; Referees: Bogdanovs, Čerņavskis (LAT)
7 May 2025; 20:00	Avdić 7	(13–18)	Elísson 8	Mirza Delibašić Hall, Sarajevo; Attendance: 1,150; Referees: Bogdanovs, Čerņavskis (LAT)
7 May 2025; 20:00	2× (suspension)	Report	1× (yellow card) 2× (suspension)	Mirza Delibašić Hall, Sarajevo; Attendance: 1,150; Referees: Bogdanovs, Čerņavskis (LAT)

8 May 2025; 15:00	Georgia	29–26	Greece	Olympic Palace, Tbilisi; Attendance: 9,865; Referees: Backović, Palačković (SLO)
8 May 2025; 15:00	Dikhaminjia 7	(14–16)	Tziras 7	Olympic Palace, Tbilisi; Attendance: 9,865; Referees: Backović, Palačković (SLO)
8 May 2025; 15:00	1× (yellow card) 6× (suspension) 2× (red card)	Report	3× (suspension)	Olympic Palace, Tbilisi; Attendance: 9,865; Referees: Backović, Palačković (SLO)

11 May 2025; 18:00	Iceland	33–21	Georgia	Laugardalshöll, Reykjavík; Attendance: 1,750; Referees: Pirvu, Potirniche (ROU)
11 May 2025; 18:00	Þorkelsson 8	(20–11)	Tskhovrebadze 7	Laugardalshöll, Reykjavík; Attendance: 1,750; Referees: Pirvu, Potirniche (ROU)
11 May 2025; 18:00	3× (suspension)	Report	1× (yellow card) 2× (suspension)	Laugardalshöll, Reykjavík; Attendance: 1,750; Referees: Pirvu, Potirniche (ROU)

11 May 2025; 18:00	Greece	30–23	Bosnia and Herzegovina	Tasos Kampouris Kanithou Indoor Hall, Chalcis; Attendance: 528; Referees: Álvarez, Bustamante (ESP)
11 May 2025; 18:00	Boskos 8	(15–11)	Hadžić, Vukšic 4	Tasos Kampouris Kanithou Indoor Hall, Chalcis; Attendance: 528; Referees: Álvarez, Bustamante (ESP)
11 May 2025; 18:00	3× (suspension)	Report	5× (suspension)	Tasos Kampouris Kanithou Indoor Hall, Chalcis; Attendance: 528; Referees: Álvarez, Bustamante (ESP)

==== Group 4 ====
Pos	Team	Pld	W	D	L	GF	GA	GD	Pts	Qualification
1	Spain	6	5	0	1	196	166	+30	10	Final tournament
2	Serbia	6	4	0	2	176	159	+17	8	Final tournament
3	Italy (Note: Qualified as one of the four best third ranked teams.)	6	3	0	3	190	182	+8	6	Final tournament
4	Latvia	6	0	0	6	165	220	−55	0	

Source: EHF
Rules for classification: 1) points; 2) head-to-head points; 3) head-to-head goal difference; 4) head-to-head number of goals scored; 5) goal difference.
Notes:

6 November 2024; 18:00	Serbia	38–25	Latvia	Kraljevo Sports Hall, Kraljevo; Attendance: 3,350; Referees: Serdiuc, Sirbu (MDA)
6 November 2024; 18:00	Pechmalbec 9	(16–10)	Kalniņš, Valkovskis 5	Kraljevo Sports Hall, Kraljevo; Attendance: 3,350; Referees: Serdiuc, Sirbu (MDA)
6 November 2024; 18:00	1× (yellow card) 6× (suspension)	Report	1× (yellow card) 4× (suspension)	Kraljevo Sports Hall, Kraljevo; Attendance: 3,350; Referees: Serdiuc, Sirbu (MDA)

6 November 2024; 21:00	Spain	31–30	Italy	Pabellón Municipal, Valencia; Attendance: 2,728; Referees: Arnautović, Jović (BIH)
6 November 2024; 21:00	Fernández 6	(15–17)	Helmersson 7	Pabellón Municipal, Valencia; Attendance: 2,728; Referees: Arnautović, Jović (BIH)
6 November 2024; 21:00	1× (yellow card) 2× (suspension)	Report	6× (suspension)	Pabellón Municipal, Valencia; Attendance: 2,728; Referees: Arnautović, Jović (BIH)

10 November 2024; 14:10	Latvia	29–38	Spain	Zemgale Olympic Center, Jelgava; Attendance: 1,200; Referees: Me. Ilievski, Mi. Ilievski (MKD)
10 November 2024; 14:10	Valkovskis 9	(15–20)	Fernández 7	Zemgale Olympic Center, Jelgava; Attendance: 1,200; Referees: Me. Ilievski, Mi. Ilievski (MKD)
10 November 2024; 14:10	1× (yellow card) 2× (suspension)	Report	2× (suspension)	Zemgale Olympic Center, Jelgava; Attendance: 1,200; Referees: Me. Ilievski, Mi. Ilievski (MKD)

10 November 2024; 18:00	Italy	31–30	Serbia	Palazzetto dello Sport, Fasano; Attendance: 2,000; Referees: Schulze, Tönnies (GER)
10 November 2024; 18:00	Helmersson 8	(13–14)	V. Ilić, Kojadinović 6	Palazzetto dello Sport, Fasano; Attendance: 2,000; Referees: Schulze, Tönnies (GER)
10 November 2024; 18:00	1× (suspension)	Report	1× (yellow card) 3× (suspension)	Palazzetto dello Sport, Fasano; Attendance: 2,000; Referees: Schulze, Tönnies (GER)

13 March 2025; 18:00	Serbia	27–25	Spain	Kraljevo Sports Hall, Kraljevo; Attendance: 3,600; Referees: Jørum, Kleven (NOR)
13 March 2025; 18:00	N. Ilić 5	(11–10)	A. Dujshebaev 4	Kraljevo Sports Hall, Kraljevo; Attendance: 3,600; Referees: Jørum, Kleven (NOR)
13 March 2025; 18:00	2× (suspension)	Report	1× (yellow card) 4× (suspension)	Kraljevo Sports Hall, Kraljevo; Attendance: 3,600; Referees: Jørum, Kleven (NOR)

13 March 2025; 18:40	Latvia	30–35	Italy	Zemgale Olympic Center, Jelgava; Attendance: 850; Referees: Stark, Ştefan (ROU)
13 March 2025; 18:40	Valkovskis 7	(15–17)	Prantner 15	Zemgale Olympic Center, Jelgava; Attendance: 850; Referees: Stark, Ştefan (ROU)
13 March 2025; 18:40	4× (suspension)	Report	1× (yellow card) 5× (suspension)	Zemgale Olympic Center, Jelgava; Attendance: 850; Referees: Stark, Ştefan (ROU)

16 March 2025; 17:30	Italy	41–30	Latvia	Palazzetto Dello Sport Sa Rodia, Oristano; Attendance: 2,000; Referees: Charitsos, Naskos (GRE)
16 March 2025; 17:30	Mengon 7	(23–12)	Valkovskis 9	Palazzetto Dello Sport Sa Rodia, Oristano; Attendance: 2,000; Referees: Charitsos, Naskos (GRE)
16 March 2025; 17:30	1× (yellow card) 3× (suspension)	Report	1× (suspension)	Palazzetto Dello Sport Sa Rodia, Oristano; Attendance: 2,000; Referees: Charitsos, Naskos (GRE)

16 March 2025; 20:00	Spain	28–26	Serbia	Quijote Arena, Ciudad Real; Attendance: 5,000; Referees: Elíasson, Pálsson (ISL)
16 March 2025; 20:00	Gómez 10	(13–11)	V. Ilić 9	Quijote Arena, Ciudad Real; Attendance: 5,000; Referees: Elíasson, Pálsson (ISL)
16 March 2025; 20:00	4× (suspension)	Report	1× (yellow card) 2× (suspension) 1× (red card)	Quijote Arena, Ciudad Real; Attendance: 5,000; Referees: Elíasson, Pálsson (ISL)

8 May 2025; 18:40	Latvia	26–27	Serbia	Zemgale Olympic Center, Jelgava; Attendance: 453; Referees: Martens (BEL), Schols ( NED)
8 May 2025; 18:40	Kalniņš 7	(8–12)	Marsenić, Šijan 5	Zemgale Olympic Center, Jelgava; Attendance: 453; Referees: Martens (BEL), Schols ( NED)
8 May 2025; 18:40	2× (suspension)	Report	1× (yellow card) 2× (suspension)	Zemgale Olympic Center, Jelgava; Attendance: 453; Referees: Martens (BEL), Schols ( NED)

8 May 2025; 19:00	Italy	29–33	Spain	Palazzetto dello Sport, Fasano; Attendance: 2,095; Referees: Horáček, Novotný (CZE)
8 May 2025; 19:00	Parisini 11	(14–16)	Gómez, Romero 6	Palazzetto dello Sport, Fasano; Attendance: 2,095; Referees: Horáček, Novotný (CZE)
8 May 2025; 19:00	2× (suspension)	Report	4× (suspension)	Palazzetto dello Sport, Fasano; Attendance: 2,095; Referees: Horáček, Novotný (CZE)

11 May 2025; 18:00	Spain	41–25	Latvia	Palacio Municipal de Deportes, Huesca; Attendance: 4,463; Referees: Linster, Rauchs (LUX)
11 May 2025; 18:00	Romero 7	(20–15)	Rogonovs 5	Palacio Municipal de Deportes, Huesca; Attendance: 4,463; Referees: Linster, Rauchs (LUX)
11 May 2025; 18:00	1× (yellow card) 4× (suspension)	Report	2× (suspension)	Palacio Municipal de Deportes, Huesca; Attendance: 4,463; Referees: Linster, Rauchs (LUX)

11 May 2025; 18:00	Serbia	28–24	Italy	Kraljevo Sports Hall, Kraljevo; Attendance: 3,200; Referees: Bíró, Kiss (HUN)
11 May 2025; 18:00	Kukić 6	(15–15)	Helmersson 7	Kraljevo Sports Hall, Kraljevo; Attendance: 3,200; Referees: Bíró, Kiss (HUN)
11 May 2025; 18:00	2× (suspension)	Report	1× (suspension)	Kraljevo Sports Hall, Kraljevo; Attendance: 3,200; Referees: Bíró, Kiss (HUN)

==== Group 5 ====
Pos	Team	Pld	W	D	L	GF	GA	GD	Pts	Qualification
1	Croatia	6	6	0	0	200	139	+61	12	Final tournament
2	Czech Republic	6	4	0	2	163	147	+16	8	Final tournament
3	Belgium	6	1	0	5	138	169	−31	2 (Note: Belgium 59–46 Luxembourg)	
4	Luxembourg	6	1	0	5	133	179	−46	2	

Source: EHF
Rules for classification: 1) points; 2) head-to-head points; 3) head-to-head goal difference; 4) head-to-head number of goals scored; 5) goal difference.
Notes:

6 November 2024; 17:30	Czech Republic	23–17	Luxembourg	UNYP Arena, Prague; Attendance: 1,482; Referees: Bozhinovski, Načevski (MKD)
6 November 2024; 17:30	Solák 6	(12–10)	Weyer 4	UNYP Arena, Prague; Attendance: 1,482; Referees: Bozhinovski, Načevski (MKD)
6 November 2024; 17:30	1× (yellow card) 3× (suspension)	Report	2× (suspension)	UNYP Arena, Prague; Attendance: 1,482; Referees: Bozhinovski, Načevski (MKD)

7 November 2024; 18:00	Croatia	30–23	Belgium	Varaždin Arena, Varaždin; Attendance: 2,800; Referees: Monitillo, Simone (ITA)
7 November 2024; 18:00	Šoštarić 10	(16–12)	Kötters 7	Varaždin Arena, Varaždin; Attendance: 2,800; Referees: Monitillo, Simone (ITA)
7 November 2024; 18:00	6× (suspension) 1× (red card)	Report	1× (yellow card) 3× (suspension)	Varaždin Arena, Varaždin; Attendance: 2,800; Referees: Monitillo, Simone (ITA)

9 November 2024; 20:15	Luxembourg	25–35	Croatia	d'Coque, Luxembourg City; Attendance: 1,388; Referees: Fabryczny, Rawicki (POL)
9 November 2024; 20:15	Etute 5	(9–19)	Šoštarić 6	d'Coque, Luxembourg City; Attendance: 1,388; Referees: Fabryczny, Rawicki (POL)
9 November 2024; 20:15	1× (suspension) 1× (red card)	Report	1× (yellow card) 2× (suspension)	d'Coque, Luxembourg City; Attendance: 1,388; Referees: Fabryczny, Rawicki (POL)

10 November 2024; 16:30	Belgium	15–31	Czech Republic	Sporthal Alverberg, Hasselt; Attendance: 1,200; Referees: Mitrović, Vešović (MNE)
10 November 2024; 16:30	Colman, Glorieux 3	(9–14)	Skopár 6	Sporthal Alverberg, Hasselt; Attendance: 1,200; Referees: Mitrović, Vešović (MNE)
10 November 2024; 16:30	1× (yellow card) 7× (suspension) 2× (red card)	Report	1× (yellow card) 4× (suspension)	Sporthal Alverberg, Hasselt; Attendance: 1,200; Referees: Mitrović, Vešović (MNE)

12 March 2025; 18:00	Czech Republic	29–35	Croatia	Winning Group Arena, Brno; Attendance: 4,300; Referees: Horváth, Marton (HUN)
12 March 2025; 18:00	Piroch 7	(18–18)	Lučin 9	Winning Group Arena, Brno; Attendance: 4,300; Referees: Horváth, Marton (HUN)
12 March 2025; 18:00	1× (yellow card) 4× (suspension)	Report	5× (suspension)	Winning Group Arena, Brno; Attendance: 4,300; Referees: Horváth, Marton (HUN)

12 March 2025; 18:45	Luxembourg	22–32	Belgium	d'Coque, Luxembourg City; Attendance: 639; Referees: Maia, Nunes (POR)
12 March 2025; 18:45	Guden 5	(13–16)	Kötters 11	d'Coque, Luxembourg City; Attendance: 639; Referees: Maia, Nunes (POR)
12 March 2025; 18:45	2× (suspension)	Report	1× (suspension)	d'Coque, Luxembourg City; Attendance: 639; Referees: Maia, Nunes (POR)

16 March 2025; 14:00	Belgium	24–27	Luxembourg	Sporthal Alverberg, Hasselt; Attendance: 1,410; Referees: Carmaux, Mursch (FRA)
16 March 2025; 14:00	three players 4	(13–14)	Werdel 6	Sporthal Alverberg, Hasselt; Attendance: 1,410; Referees: Carmaux, Mursch (FRA)
16 March 2025; 14:00	1× (yellow card) 3× (suspension)	Report	5× (suspension)	Sporthal Alverberg, Hasselt; Attendance: 1,410; Referees: Carmaux, Mursch (FRA)

16 March 2025; 17:30	Croatia	36–20	Czech Republic	Arena Zagreb, Zagreb; Attendance: 16,000; Referees: Pirvu, Potirniche (ROU)
16 March 2025; 17:30	Glavaš, Šipić 6	(17–9)	Josef 5	Arena Zagreb, Zagreb; Attendance: 16,000; Referees: Pirvu, Potirniche (ROU)
16 March 2025; 17:30	1× (yellow card) 5× (suspension)	Report	1× (yellow card) 5× (suspension) 1× (red card)	Arena Zagreb, Zagreb; Attendance: 16,000; Referees: Pirvu, Potirniche (ROU)

7 May 2025; 18:45	Luxembourg	22–35	Czech Republic	d'Coque, Luxembourg City; Attendance: 465; Referees: Pétursson, Þrastarson (ISL)
7 May 2025; 18:45	Guden 7	(8–19)	Skopár 6	d'Coque, Luxembourg City; Attendance: 465; Referees: Pétursson, Þrastarson (ISL)
7 May 2025; 18:45	4× (suspension)	Report	2× (yellow card) 6× (suspension)	d'Coque, Luxembourg City; Attendance: 465; Referees: Pétursson, Þrastarson (ISL)

7 May 2025; 20:10	Belgium	22–34	Croatia	Sporthal Alverberg, Hasselt; Attendance: 1,250; Referees: Borge, Nygren (NOR)
7 May 2025; 20:10	Kötters 6	(8–16)	three players 5	Sporthal Alverberg, Hasselt; Attendance: 1,250; Referees: Borge, Nygren (NOR)
7 May 2025; 20:10	2× (suspension)	Report	3× (suspension)	Sporthal Alverberg, Hasselt; Attendance: 1,250; Referees: Borge, Nygren (NOR)

11 May 2025; 18:00	Croatia	30–20	Luxembourg	Centar Zamet, Rijeka; Attendance: 2,349; Referees: Yonchev, Yovchev (BUL)
11 May 2025; 18:00	Šipić 7	(15–10)	Kaysen 5	Centar Zamet, Rijeka; Attendance: 2,349; Referees: Yonchev, Yovchev (BUL)
11 May 2025; 18:00	3× (suspension)	Report	4× (suspension)	Centar Zamet, Rijeka; Attendance: 2,349; Referees: Yonchev, Yovchev (BUL)

11 May 2025; 18:00	Czech Republic	25–22	Belgium	Hala Polárka, Frýdek-Místek; Attendance: 2,022; Referees: Kurtagic, Wetterwik (SWE)
11 May 2025; 18:00	Patzel 6	(12–8)	Colman 6	Hala Polárka, Frýdek-Místek; Attendance: 2,022; Referees: Kurtagic, Wetterwik (SWE)
11 May 2025; 18:00	3× (suspension)	Report	3× (suspension)	Hala Polárka, Frýdek-Místek; Attendance: 2,022; Referees: Kurtagic, Wetterwik (SWE)

==== Group 6 ====
Pos	Team	Pld	W	D	L	GF	GA	GD	Pts	Qualification
1	Faroe Islands	6	4	1	1	188	169	+19	9	Final tournament
2	Netherlands	6	3	2	1	205	192	+13	8	Final tournament
3	Ukraine (Note: Qualified as one of the four best third ranked teams.)	6	2	0	4	194	198	−4	4	Final tournament
4	Kosovo	6	1	1	4	162	190	−28	3	

Source: EHF
Rules for classification: 1) points; 2) head-to-head points; 3) head-to-head goal difference; 4) head-to-head number of goals scored; 5) goal difference.
Notes:

6 November 2024; 20:00	Faroe Islands	32–21	Kosovo	Høllin á Hálsi, Tórshavn; Attendance: 1,700; Referees: Picard, Vauchez (FRA)
6 November 2024; 20:00	Ó. Mittún 8	(13–9)	three players 4	Høllin á Hálsi, Tórshavn; Attendance: 1,700; Referees: Picard, Vauchez (FRA)
6 November 2024; 20:00	4× (suspension)	Report	1× (yellow card) 2× (suspension)	Høllin á Hálsi, Tórshavn; Attendance: 1,700; Referees: Picard, Vauchez (FRA)

7 November 2024; 19:30	Netherlands	40–39	Ukraine	Topsportcentrum, Almere; Attendance: 1,250; Referees: Borge, Nygren (NOR)
7 November 2024; 19:30	Baijens 9	(19–20)	Artemenko 13	Topsportcentrum, Almere; Attendance: 1,250; Referees: Borge, Nygren (NOR)
7 November 2024; 19:30	2× (suspension)	Report	4× (suspension)	Topsportcentrum, Almere; Attendance: 1,250; Referees: Borge, Nygren (NOR)

10 November 2024; 14:00	Ukraine	35–32	Faroe Islands	Twinsbet Arena, Vilnius, Lithuania (Note: Due to the Russian invasion of Ukraine, the Ukrainian team plays their home matches at neutral venues.); Attendance: 250; Referees: Cindrić, Gonzurek (CRO)
10 November 2024; 14:00	Turchenko 11	(14–17)	Ó. Mittún 8	Twinsbet Arena, Vilnius, Lithuania; Attendance: 250; Referees: Cindrić, Gonzurek (CRO)
10 November 2024; 14:00	4× (suspension)	Report	1× (yellow card) 1× (suspension)	Twinsbet Arena, Vilnius, Lithuania; Attendance: 250; Referees: Cindrić, Gonzurek (CRO)

10 November 2024; 17:15	Kosovo	33–33	Netherlands	Sport Hall 1 October, Pristina; Attendance: 1,750; Referees: Lovin, Stancu (ROU)
10 November 2024; 17:15	Dedaj 8	(19–17)	Ten Velde 13	Sport Hall 1 October, Pristina; Attendance: 1,750; Referees: Lovin, Stancu (ROU)
10 November 2024; 17:15	3× (suspension)	Report	1× (yellow card) 4× (suspension)	Sport Hall 1 October, Pristina; Attendance: 1,750; Referees: Lovin, Stancu (ROU)

12 March 2025; 20:00	Faroe Islands	32–32	Netherlands	Við Tjarnir, Tórshavn; Attendance: 3,020; Referees: García, Marín (ESP)
12 March 2025; 20:00	E. Ellefsen á Skipagøtu 11	(18–14)	Ten Velde 12	Við Tjarnir, Tórshavn; Attendance: 3,020; Referees: García, Marín (ESP)
12 March 2025; 20:00	1× (yellow card) 3× (suspension)	Report	2× (yellow card) 7× (suspension)	Við Tjarnir, Tórshavn; Attendance: 3,020; Referees: García, Marín (ESP)

13 March 2025; 20:15	Kosovo	31–30	Ukraine	Palace of Youth and Sports, Pristina; Attendance: 2,380; Referees: Yonchev, Yovchev (BUL)
13 March 2025; 20:15	Gegaj 9	(16–12)	Artemenko 10	Palace of Youth and Sports, Pristina; Attendance: 2,380; Referees: Yonchev, Yovchev (BUL)
13 March 2025; 20:15	2× (suspension)	Report	1× (yellow card) 3× (suspension)	Palace of Youth and Sports, Pristina; Attendance: 2,380; Referees: Yonchev, Yovchev (BUL)

16 March 2025; 15:00	Netherlands	31–32	Faroe Islands	Topsportcentrum, Almere; Attendance: 2,500; Referees: Antić, Jakovljević (SRB)
16 March 2025; 15:00	Ten Velde 8	(15–15)	E. Ellefsen á Skipagøtu 8	Topsportcentrum, Almere; Attendance: 2,500; Referees: Antić, Jakovljević (SRB)
16 March 2025; 15:00	2× (suspension) 1× (red card)	Report	5× (suspension)	Topsportcentrum, Almere; Attendance: 2,500; Referees: Antić, Jakovljević (SRB)

16 March 2025; 18:00	Ukraine	36–25	Kosovo	Švyturys Arena, Klaipėda, Lithuania; Attendance: 350; Referees: Grigalionis, Šniurevičius (LTU)
16 March 2025; 18:00	Turchenko 10	(18–8)	Shabani 5	Švyturys Arena, Klaipėda, Lithuania; Attendance: 350; Referees: Grigalionis, Šniurevičius (LTU)
16 March 2025; 18:00	1× (yellow card) 3× (suspension) 1× (red card)	Report		Švyturys Arena, Klaipėda, Lithuania; Attendance: 350; Referees: Grigalionis, Šniurevičius (LTU)

8 May 2025; 19:30	Ukraine	27–35	Netherlands	City Sport Hall, Michalovce, Slovakia; Attendance: 150; Referees: Budzák, Záhradník (SVK)
8 May 2025; 19:30	Artemenko 8	(11–19)	four players 6	City Sport Hall, Michalovce, Slovakia; Attendance: 150; Referees: Budzák, Záhradník (SVK)
8 May 2025; 19:30	1× (suspension)	Report	3× (suspension)	City Sport Hall, Michalovce, Slovakia; Attendance: 150; Referees: Budzák, Záhradník (SVK)

8 May 2025; 20:15	Kosovo	23–25	Faroe Islands	Palace of Youth and Sports, Pristina; Attendance: 1,200; Referees: Fabryczny, Rawicki (POL)
8 May 2025; 20:15	Tahirukaj 8	(13–12)	Av Teigum 11	Palace of Youth and Sports, Pristina; Attendance: 1,200; Referees: Fabryczny, Rawicki (POL)
8 May 2025; 20:15	1× (yellow card) 3× (suspension)	Report	1× (yellow card) 6× (suspension)	Palace of Youth and Sports, Pristina; Attendance: 1,200; Referees: Fabryczny, Rawicki (POL)

11 May 2025; 18:00	Netherlands	34–29	Kosovo	Maaspoort, 's-Hertogenbosch; Attendance: 1,000; Referees: D. Lončar, Z. Lončar (CRO)
11 May 2025; 18:00	Ten Velde 12	(16–12)	Gegaj 8	Maaspoort, 's-Hertogenbosch; Attendance: 1,000; Referees: D. Lončar, Z. Lončar (CRO)
11 May 2025; 18:00	2× (suspension)	Report	4× (suspension) 1× (red card)	Maaspoort, 's-Hertogenbosch; Attendance: 1,000; Referees: D. Lončar, Z. Lončar (CRO)

11 May 2025; 18:00	Faroe Islands	35–27	Ukraine	Við Tjarnir, Tórshavn; Attendance: 3,020; Referees: D. Martins, R. Martins (POR)
11 May 2025; 18:00	E. Ellefsen á Skipagøtu 9	(15–13)	Artemenko 7	Við Tjarnir, Tórshavn; Attendance: 3,020; Referees: D. Martins, R. Martins (POR)
11 May 2025; 18:00	4× (suspension)	Report	3× (suspension)	Við Tjarnir, Tórshavn; Attendance: 3,020; Referees: D. Martins, R. Martins (POR)

==== Group 7 ====
Pos	Team	Pld	W	D	L	GF	GA	GD	Pts	Qualification
1	Germany	6	4	2	0	204	165	+39	10	Final tournament
2	Austria	6	3	2	1	180	176	+4	8	Final tournament
3	Switzerland (Note: Qualified as one of the four best third ranked teams.)	6	2	2	2	188	191	−3	6	Final tournament
4	Turkey	6	0	0	6	173	213	−40	0	

Source: EHF
Rules for classification: 1) points; 2) head-to-head points; 3) head-to-head goal difference; 4) head-to-head number of goals scored; 5) goal difference.
Notes:

7 November 2024; 18:00	Austria	31–28	Turkey	Sporthalle Rieden-Vorkloster, Bregenz; Attendance: 1,800; Referees: D. Lončar, Z. Lončar (CRO)
7 November 2024; 18:00	Bilyk, Frimmel 7	(17–13)	Biçer 7	Sporthalle Rieden-Vorkloster, Bregenz; Attendance: 1,800; Referees: D. Lončar, Z. Lončar (CRO)
7 November 2024; 18:00	4× (suspension)	Report	1× (suspension)	Sporthalle Rieden-Vorkloster, Bregenz; Attendance: 1,800; Referees: D. Lončar, Z. Lončar (CRO)

7 November 2024; 18:30	Germany	35–26	Switzerland	SAP Arena, Mannheim; Attendance: 12,721; Referees: D. Martins, R. Martins (POR)
7 November 2024; 18:30	Zerbe 8	(21–13)	Rubin, Zehnder 5	SAP Arena, Mannheim; Attendance: 12,721; Referees: D. Martins, R. Martins (POR)
7 November 2024; 18:30	2× (suspension)	Report	1× (suspension)	SAP Arena, Mannheim; Attendance: 12,721; Referees: D. Martins, R. Martins (POR)

10 November 2024; 15:10	Turkey	29–36	Germany	Dr. Yaşar Sevim Sport Hall, Ankara; Attendance: 2,090; Referees: Metalari, Nikolovski (MKD)
10 November 2024; 15:10	Pehlivan 7	(14–20)	Grgić, Zerbe 8	Dr. Yaşar Sevim Sport Hall, Ankara; Attendance: 2,090; Referees: Metalari, Nikolovski (MKD)
10 November 2024; 15:10	2× (yellow card) 5× (suspension)	Report	3× (suspension)	Dr. Yaşar Sevim Sport Hall, Ankara; Attendance: 2,090; Referees: Metalari, Nikolovski (MKD)

10 November 2024; 16:00	Switzerland	29–29	Austria	BBC-Arena, Schaffhausen; Attendance: 2,450; Referees: García, Marín (ESP)
10 November 2024; 16:00	Maros, Zehnder 6	(12–12)	Wagner 8	BBC-Arena, Schaffhausen; Attendance: 2,450; Referees: García, Marín (ESP)
10 November 2024; 16:00	6× (suspension) 3× (red card)	Report	2× (yellow card) 6× (suspension) 1× (red card)	BBC-Arena, Schaffhausen; Attendance: 2,450; Referees: García, Marín (ESP)

12 March 2025; 18:30	Turkey	34–38	Switzerland	75. Yıl Spor Salonu, Diyarbakır; Attendance: 4,500; Referees: Pavićević, Ražnatović (MNE)
12 March 2025; 18:30	Hacıoğlu 7	(16–21)	three players 6	75. Yıl Spor Salonu, Diyarbakır; Attendance: 4,500; Referees: Pavićević, Ražnatović (MNE)
12 March 2025; 18:30	1× (yellow card) 2× (suspension) 1× (red card)	Report	2× (suspension)	75. Yıl Spor Salonu, Diyarbakır; Attendance: 4,500; Referees: Pavićević, Ražnatović (MNE)

13 March 2025; 18:00	Austria	26–26	Germany	Steffl Arena, Vienna; Attendance: 6,019; Referees: Boričić, Marković (SRB)
13 March 2025; 18:00	Wagner 8	(11–13)	Golla 5	Steffl Arena, Vienna; Attendance: 6,019; Referees: Boričić, Marković (SRB)
13 March 2025; 18:00	1× (yellow card) 4× (suspension)	Report	1× (yellow card) 3× (suspension)	Steffl Arena, Vienna; Attendance: 6,019; Referees: Boričić, Marković (SRB)

15 March 2025; 16:30	Germany	31–26	Austria	ZAG-Arena, Hanover; Attendance: 10,369; Referees: A. Covalciuc, I. Covalciuc (MDA)
15 March 2025; 16:30	Grgić 7	(16–14)	Herburger 5	ZAG-Arena, Hanover; Attendance: 10,369; Referees: A. Covalciuc, I. Covalciuc (MDA)
15 March 2025; 16:30	3× (suspension)	Report	1× (yellow card) 1× (suspension)	ZAG-Arena, Hanover; Attendance: 10,369; Referees: A. Covalciuc, I. Covalciuc (MDA)

16 March 2025; 16:00	Switzerland	30–27	Turkey	AXA Arena, Winterthur; Attendance: 2,000; Referees: Jerlecki, Łabuń (POL)
16 March 2025; 16:00	Aellen 7	(15–14)	Pehlivan 7	AXA Arena, Winterthur; Attendance: 2,000; Referees: Jerlecki, Łabuń (POL)
16 March 2025; 16:00	2× (suspension)	Report	2× (suspension)	AXA Arena, Winterthur; Attendance: 2,000; Referees: Jerlecki, Łabuń (POL)

7 May 2025; 18:00	Turkey	29–34	Austria	Taha Akgül Spor Salonu, Sivas; Attendance: 3,300; Referees: K. Gasmi, R. Gasmi (FRA)
7 May 2025; 18:00	Pehlivan 12	(14–19)	Beloš 9	Taha Akgül Spor Salonu, Sivas; Attendance: 3,300; Referees: K. Gasmi, R. Gasmi (FRA)
7 May 2025; 18:00	1× (yellow card) 1× (suspension)	Report	1× (yellow card) 1× (suspension)	Taha Akgül Spor Salonu, Sivas; Attendance: 3,300; Referees: K. Gasmi, R. Gasmi (FRA)

7 May 2025; 19:00	Switzerland	32–32	Germany	Hallenstadion, Zurich; Attendance: 8,300; Referees: Lah, Sok (SLO)
7 May 2025; 19:00	Leopold 9	(14–11)	Knorr 6	Hallenstadion, Zurich; Attendance: 8,300; Referees: Lah, Sok (SLO)
7 May 2025; 19:00	1× (yellow card) 4× (suspension)	Report	1× (suspension)	Hallenstadion, Zurich; Attendance: 8,300; Referees: Lah, Sok (SLO)

11 May 2025; 18:00	Germany	44–26	Turkey	Porsche-Arena, Stuttgart; Attendance: 6,149; Referees: Balvan, Praštalo (BIH)
11 May 2025; 18:00	Schluroff 6	(21–11)	Pehlivan 5	Porsche-Arena, Stuttgart; Attendance: 6,149; Referees: Balvan, Praštalo (BIH)
11 May 2025; 18:00		Report	4× (suspension)	Porsche-Arena, Stuttgart; Attendance: 6,149; Referees: Balvan, Praštalo (BIH)

11 May 2025; 18:00	Austria	34–33	Switzerland	Raiffeisen Sportpark Graz, Graz; Attendance: 3,000; Referees: Mitrevski, Todorovski (MKD)
11 May 2025; 18:00	Božović 9	(16–15)	Sigrist 8	Raiffeisen Sportpark Graz, Graz; Attendance: 3,000; Referees: Mitrevski, Todorovski (MKD)
11 May 2025; 18:00	1× (yellow card) 4× (suspension)	Report	1× (yellow card) 5× (suspension)	Raiffeisen Sportpark Graz, Graz; Attendance: 3,000; Referees: Mitrevski, Todorovski (MKD)

==== Group 8 ====
Pos	Team	Pld	W	D	L	GF	GA	GD	Pts	Qualification
1	Portugal	6	4	1	1	200	177	+23	9	Final tournament
2	Poland	6	2	2	2	184	190	−6	6	Final tournament
3	Romania (Note: Qualified as one of the four best third ranked teams.)	6	2	1	3	172	174	−2	5	Final tournament
4	Israel	6	1	2	3	176	191	−15	4	

Source: EHF
Rules for classification: 1) points; 2) head-to-head points; 3) head-to-head goal difference; 4) head-to-head number of goals scored; 5) goal difference.
Notes:

7 November 2024; 18:00	Poland	32–32	Israel	Hala Urania, Olsztyn; Attendance: 4,030; Referees: Boričić, Marković (SRB)
7 November 2024; 18:00	Moryto 10	(12–16)	Lumbroso 9	Hala Urania, Olsztyn; Attendance: 4,030; Referees: Boričić, Marković (SRB)
7 November 2024; 18:00	1× (yellow card) 5× (suspension)	Report	5× (suspension)	Hala Urania, Olsztyn; Attendance: 4,030; Referees: Boričić, Marković (SRB)

7 November 2024; 20:00	Portugal	37–30	Romania	Pavilhão Desportivo Municipal de Santo Tirso, Santo Tirso; Attendance: 1,000; Referees: K. Gasmi, R. Gasmi (FRA)
7 November 2024; 20:00	Frade 11	(12–16)	Botea 9	Pavilhão Desportivo Municipal de Santo Tirso, Santo Tirso; Attendance: 1,000; Referees: K. Gasmi, R. Gasmi (FRA)
7 November 2024; 20:00	1× (yellow card) 1× (suspension)	Report	1× (yellow card) 5× (suspension)	Pavilhão Desportivo Municipal de Santo Tirso, Santo Tirso; Attendance: 1,000; Referees: K. Gasmi, R. Gasmi (FRA)

10 November 2024; 18:00	Romania	27–28	Poland	Romeo Iamandi Sports Hall, Buzău; Attendance: 1,800; Referees: Horáček, Novotný (CZE)
10 November 2024; 18:00	Botea 8	(9–15)	Moryto, Przytuła 6	Romeo Iamandi Sports Hall, Buzău; Attendance: 1,800; Referees: Horáček, Novotný (CZE)
10 November 2024; 18:00	1× (suspension)	Report	4× (suspension)	Romeo Iamandi Sports Hall, Buzău; Attendance: 1,800; Referees: Horáček, Novotný (CZE)

10 November 2024; 18:30	Portugal	36–23	Israel	Pavilhão Desportivo Municipal de Santo Tirso, Santo Tirso; Attendance: 2,050; Referees: Fotakidis, Kinatzidis (GRE)
10 November 2024; 18:30	M. Costa 6	(21–13)	Levi 5	Pavilhão Desportivo Municipal de Santo Tirso, Santo Tirso; Attendance: 2,050; Referees: Fotakidis, Kinatzidis (GRE)
10 November 2024; 18:30	6× (suspension)	Report	2× (suspension)	Pavilhão Desportivo Municipal de Santo Tirso, Santo Tirso; Attendance: 2,050; Referees: Fotakidis, Kinatzidis (GRE)

13 March 2025; 18:00	Poland	36–36	Portugal	Ergo Arena, Gdańsk; Attendance: 9,001; Referees: Načevski, Nikolov (MKD)
13 March 2025; 18:00	Olejniczak 9	(16–14)	Gomes 7	Ergo Arena, Gdańsk; Attendance: 9,001; Referees: Načevski, Nikolov (MKD)
13 March 2025; 18:00	1× (yellow card) 3× (suspension)	Report	2× (yellow card) 2× (suspension)	Ergo Arena, Gdańsk; Attendance: 9,001; Referees: Načevski, Nikolov (MKD)

13 March 2025; 21:00	Israel	29–29	Romania	Kraljevo Sports Hall, Kraljevo, Serbia (Note: Due to the Gaza war, the Israeli team plays their home matches at neutral venues.); Attendance: 250; Referees: Metalari, Nikolovski (MKD)
13 March 2025; 21:00	Lumbroso 8	(14–15)	Stanciuc 8	Kraljevo Sports Hall, Kraljevo, Serbia; Attendance: 250; Referees: Metalari, Nikolovski (MKD)
13 March 2025; 21:00	1× (yellow card) 2× (suspension)	Report	1× (yellow card) 3× (suspension)	Kraljevo Sports Hall, Kraljevo, Serbia; Attendance: 250; Referees: Metalari, Nikolovski (MKD)

16 March 2025; 18:00	Romania	29–26	Israel	Sala Sporturilor Mioveni, Mioveni; Attendance: 1,500; Referees: Cipov, Klus (SVK)
16 March 2025; 18:00	Stanciuc 10	(15–12)	Turkenitz 6	Sala Sporturilor Mioveni, Mioveni; Attendance: 1,500; Referees: Cipov, Klus (SVK)
16 March 2025; 18:00	1× (yellow card) 2× (suspension)	Report	3× (suspension)	Sala Sporturilor Mioveni, Mioveni; Attendance: 1,500; Referees: Cipov, Klus (SVK)

16 March 2025; 18:30	Portugal	33–27	Poland	Pavilhão Multiusos de Odivelas, Odivelas; Attendance: 2,000; Referees: Cindrić, Gonzurek (CRO)
16 March 2025; 18:30	Gomes 7	(16–12)	three players 4	Pavilhão Multiusos de Odivelas, Odivelas; Attendance: 2,000; Referees: Cindrić, Gonzurek (CRO)
16 March 2025; 18:30	3× (suspension)	Report	3× (suspension)	Pavilhão Multiusos de Odivelas, Odivelas; Attendance: 2,000; Referees: Cindrić, Gonzurek (CRO)

8 May 2025; 15:00	Israel	33–31	Poland	Sala Sporturilor Simona Amanar, Constanța, Romania; Attendance: 0 Referees: Horváth, Marton (HUN)
8 May 2025; 15:00	Lumbroso 9	(18–18)	Czapliński 10	Sala Sporturilor Simona Amanar, Constanța, Romania; Attendance: 0 Referees: Horváth, Marton (HUN)
8 May 2025; 15:00	1× (yellow card) 1× (suspension)	Report	1× (yellow card) 3× (suspension) 1× (red card)	Sala Sporturilor Simona Amanar, Constanța, Romania; Attendance: 0 Referees: Horváth, Marton (HUN)

8 May 2025; 18:00	Romania	28–24	Portugal	Sala Sporturilor Simona Amanar, Constanța; Attendance: 2,900; Referees: Jovandić, Sekulić (SRB)
8 May 2025; 18:00	Stanciuc 13	(13–11)	Caldeira, França 4	Sala Sporturilor Simona Amanar, Constanța; Attendance: 2,900; Referees: Jovandić, Sekulić (SRB)
8 May 2025; 18:00	1× (yellow card) 1× (suspension)	Report	1× (yellow card)	Sala Sporturilor Simona Amanar, Constanța; Attendance: 2,900; Referees: Jovandić, Sekulić (SRB)

11 May 2025; 18:00	Israel	33–34	Portugal	Sala Sporturilor Simona Amanar, Constanța, Romania; Attendance: 0 Referees: Ivanović, Vujisić (MNE)
11 May 2025; 18:00	Lumbroso 9	(15–17)	Soares 6	Sala Sporturilor Simona Amanar, Constanța, Romania; Attendance: 0 Referees: Ivanović, Vujisić (MNE)
11 May 2025; 18:00	2× (yellow card) 5× (suspension)	Report	1× (yellow card) 5× (suspension)	Sala Sporturilor Simona Amanar, Constanța, Romania; Attendance: 0 Referees: Ivanović, Vujisić (MNE)

11 May 2025; 18:00	Poland	30–29	Romania	Arena Gorzów, Gorzów Wielkopolski; Attendance: 4,650; Referees: Pavićević, Ražnatović (MNE)
11 May 2025; 18:00	Daszek 8	(15–14)	Stanciuc 10	Arena Gorzów, Gorzów Wielkopolski; Attendance: 4,650; Referees: Pavićević, Ražnatović (MNE)
11 May 2025; 18:00	1× (yellow card) 2× (suspension)	Report	1× (yellow card) 4× (suspension)	Arena Gorzów, Gorzów Wielkopolski; Attendance: 4,650; Referees: Pavićević, Ražnatović (MNE)

==== Ranking of third-placed teams ====
The results against the fourth-placed team are omitted.

Pos	Grp	Team	Pld	W	D	L	GF	GA	GD	Pts	Qualification
1	8	Romania	4	1	0	3	114	119	−5	2	Final tournament
2	4	Italy	4	1	0	3	114	122	−8	2	Final tournament
3	7	Switzerland	4	0	2	2	120	130	−10	2	Final tournament
4	6	Ukraine	4	1	0	3	128	142	−14	2	Final tournament
5	1	Lithuania	4	1	0	3	99	120	−21	2	
6	3	Greece	4	1	0	3	99	122	−23	2	
7	2	Finland	4	0	0	4	103	131	−28	0	
8	5	Belgium	4	0	0	4	82	120	−38	0	

Source: EHF
Rules for classification: 1) points; 2) goal difference; 3) number of goals scored; 4) draw.

== EHF Euro Cup ==
The EHF Euro Cup is played between the 2026 co-hosts Denmark, Norway and Sweden, plus the champions of the 2024 European Championship, France.

=== Standings ===
Pos	Team	Pld	W	D	L	GF	GA	GD	Pts
1	France	6	6	0	0	209	194	+15	12
2	Denmark	6	3	0	3	204	188	+16	6 (Note: Denmark 63–62 Sweden)
3	Sweden	6	3	0	3	194	192	+2	6
4	Norway	6	0	0	6	173	206	−33	0

Source: EHF
Rules for classification: 1) points; 2) head-to-head points; 3) head-to-head goal difference; 4) head-to-head number of goals scored; 5) goal difference.

=== Results ===
Times from November to March are UTC+1, Times in May are UTC+2.

6 November 2024; 21:00	Denmark	32–27	Norway	Jyske Bank Boxen, Herning; Attendance: 6,500; Referees: Bolic, Hurich (AUT)
6 November 2024; 21:00	Gidsel 10	(15–13)	Tønnesen 5	Jyske Bank Boxen, Herning; Attendance: 6,500; Referees: Bolic, Hurich (AUT)
6 November 2024; 21:00	1× (yellow card)	Report	2× (suspension) 1× (red card)	Jyske Bank Boxen, Herning; Attendance: 6,500; Referees: Bolic, Hurich (AUT)

6 November 2024; 21:10	France	37–31	Sweden	Arena Orléans, Orléans; Attendance: 5,567; Referees: Mikelić, Parađina (CRO)
6 November 2024; 21:10	Descat 9	(21–11)	Pellas 6	Arena Orléans, Orléans; Attendance: 5,567; Referees: Mikelić, Parađina (CRO)
6 November 2024; 21:10	1× (yellow card) 3× (suspension)	Report	1× (yellow card) 1× (suspension)	Arena Orléans, Orléans; Attendance: 5,567; Referees: Mikelić, Parađina (CRO)

9 November 2024; 18:15	Norway	27–31	France	Stavanger Idrettshall, Stavanger; Attendance: 3,824; Referees: Bíró, Kiss (HUN)
9 November 2024; 18:15	Pettersen 4	(14–17)	Remili, Tournat 5	Stavanger Idrettshall, Stavanger; Attendance: 3,824; Referees: Bíró, Kiss (HUN)
9 November 2024; 18:15	5× (suspension)	Report	1× (suspension)	Stavanger Idrettshall, Stavanger; Attendance: 3,824; Referees: Bíró, Kiss (HUN)

10 November 2024; 16:00	Sweden	29–33	Denmark	Saab Arena, Linköping; Attendance: 6,676; Referees: Jovandić, Sekulić (SRB)
10 November 2024; 16:00	Gottfridsson 6	(16–17)	four players 4	Saab Arena, Linköping; Attendance: 6,676; Referees: Jovandić, Sekulić (SRB)
10 November 2024; 16:00	3× (suspension)	Report	1× (yellow card) 2× (suspension)	Saab Arena, Linköping; Attendance: 6,676; Referees: Jovandić, Sekulić (SRB)

12 March 2025; 19:00	Sweden	38–29	Norway	Avicii Arena, Stockholm; Attendance: 11,048; Referees: Lovin, Stancu (ROU)
12 March 2025; 19:00	Mellegård 6	(20–17)	Barthold, Lyse 6	Avicii Arena, Stockholm; Attendance: 11,048; Referees: Lovin, Stancu (ROU)
12 March 2025; 19:00	1× (suspension)	Report	4× (suspension)	Avicii Arena, Stockholm; Attendance: 11,048; Referees: Lovin, Stancu (ROU)

12 March 2025; 20:45	France	33–32	Denmark	LDLC Arena, Décines-Charpieu; Attendance: 10,489; Referees: Kažanegra, Vujačić (MNE)
12 March 2025; 20:45	three players 7	(17–17)	Andersson 7	LDLC Arena, Décines-Charpieu; Attendance: 10,489; Referees: Kažanegra, Vujačić (MNE)
12 March 2025; 20:45	1× (yellow card) 3× (suspension)	Report	1× (yellow card) 2× (suspension)	LDLC Arena, Décines-Charpieu; Attendance: 10,489; Referees: Kažanegra, Vujačić (MNE)

15 March 2025; 14:45	Norway	30–31	Sweden	Trondheim Spektrum, Trondheim; Attendance: 5,023; Referees: Barysas, Petrušis (LTU)
15 March 2025; 14:45	Gulliksen, Pedersen 6	(12–16)	four players 5	Trondheim Spektrum, Trondheim; Attendance: 5,023; Referees: Barysas, Petrušis (LTU)
15 March 2025; 14:45	1× (yellow card) 4× (suspension)	Report	1× (yellow card) 2× (suspension)	Trondheim Spektrum, Trondheim; Attendance: 5,023; Referees: Barysas, Petrušis (LTU)

15 March 2025; 16:00	Denmark	38–40	France	Sydbank Arena, Kolding; Attendance: 5,000; Referees: Weijmans, Wolbertus (NED)
15 March 2025; 16:00	Gidsel 10	(17–16)	Prandi 8	Sydbank Arena, Kolding; Attendance: 5,000; Referees: Weijmans, Wolbertus (NED)
15 March 2025; 16:00	2× (yellow card) 3× (suspension)	Report	1× (yellow card) 5× (suspension)	Sydbank Arena, Kolding; Attendance: 5,000; Referees: Weijmans, Wolbertus (NED)

7 May 2025; 18:15	Norway	26–39	Denmark	DNB Arena, Stavanger; Attendance: 3,513; Referees: Antić, Jakovljević (SRB)
7 May 2025; 18:15	Abelvik Rød 7	(10–18)	Madsen 7	DNB Arena, Stavanger; Attendance: 3,513; Referees: Antić, Jakovljević (SRB)
7 May 2025; 18:15	3× (suspension)	Report	2× (yellow card) 4× (suspension)	DNB Arena, Stavanger; Attendance: 3,513; Referees: Antić, Jakovljević (SRB)

7 May 2025; 19:00	Sweden	32–33	France	Scandinavium, Gothenburg; Attendance: 12,044; Referees: Bozhinovski, Načevski (MKD)
7 May 2025; 19:00	Karlsson 5	(18–18)	Tournat 6	Scandinavium, Gothenburg; Attendance: 12,044; Referees: Bozhinovski, Načevski (MKD)
7 May 2025; 19:00	2× (suspension)	Report	1× (yellow card) 4× (suspension)	Scandinavium, Gothenburg; Attendance: 12,044; Referees: Bozhinovski, Načevski (MKD)

11 May 2025; 16:00	Denmark	30–33	Sweden	Royal Arena, Copenhagen; Attendance: 11,287; Referees: Kull, Tint (EST)
11 May 2025; 16:00	Møller 7	(16–13)	Johansson 6	Royal Arena, Copenhagen; Attendance: 11,287; Referees: Kull, Tint (EST)
11 May 2025; 16:00	3× (suspension)	Report	4× (suspension)	Royal Arena, Copenhagen; Attendance: 11,287; Referees: Kull, Tint (EST)

11 May 2025; 18:00	France	35–34	Norway	Kindarena Rouen, Rouen; Attendance: 5,186; Referees: Caçador, Nicolau (POR)
11 May 2025; 18:00	Richardson 8	(14–16)	Gulliksen, Heldal 6	Kindarena Rouen, Rouen; Attendance: 5,186; Referees: Caçador, Nicolau (POR)
11 May 2025; 18:00	5× (suspension) 1× (red card)	Report	5× (suspension) 1× (red card)	Kindarena Rouen, Rouen; Attendance: 5,186; Referees: Caçador, Nicolau (POR)

== Qualified teams ==
Team	Qualification method	Date of qualification	Appearance(s)				Previous best performance (Note: Bold text indicates they hosted that edition.)	Rank
Team	Qualification method	Date of qualification	Total	First	Last	Streak	Previous best performance	Rank
Denmark	Host nation	20 November 2021	16th	1994	2024	14	Champions (2008, 2012)	1
Norway	Host nation	20 November 2021	12th	2000	2024	11	Third place (2020)	8
Sweden	Host nation	20 November 2021	16th	1994	2024	10	Champions (1994, 1998, 2000, 2002, 2022)	4
France	Defending champions	26 January 2024	17th	1994	2024	17	Champions (2006, 2010, 2014, 2024)	2
Iceland	Top two in Group 3	15 March 2025	14th	2000	2024	14	Third place (2010)	9
Croatia	Top two in Group 5	15 March 2025	17th	1994	2024	17	Runners-up (2008, 2010, 2020)	5
Slovenia	Top two in Group 1	15 March 2025	15th	1994	2024	6	Runners-up (2004)	11
Portugal	Top two in Group 8	16 March 2025	9th	1994	2024	4	Sixth place (2020)	7
Hungary	Top two in Group 2	7 May 2025	15th	1994	2024	12	Fifth place (2024)	6
Czech Republic	Top two in Group 5	7 May 2025	13th	1996	2024	5	Sixth place (1996)	17
Germany	Top two in Group 7	7 May 2025	16th	1994	2024	6	Champions (2004, 2016)	3
Georgia	Top two in Group 3	8 May 2025	2nd	2024	2024	2	18th place (2024)	26
Montenegro	Top two in Group 2	8 May 2025	8th	2008	2024	7	Eleventh place (2022)	14
Spain	Top two in Group 4	8 May 2025	17th	1994	2024	17	Champions (2018, 2020)	10
Faroe Islands	Top two in Group 6	8 May 2025	2nd	2024	2024	2	20th place (2024)	21
Netherlands	Top two in Group 6	8 May 2025	4th	2020	2024	4	Tenth place (2022)	12
Austria	Top two in Group 7	11 May 2025	7th	2010	2024	5	Eighth place (2020, 2024)	13
North Macedonia	Top two in Group 1	11 May 2025	9th	1998	2024	8	Fifth place (2012)	19
Poland	Top two in Group 8	11 May 2025	12th	2002	2024	4	Fourth place (2010)	16
Serbia	Top two in Group 4	11 May 2025	13th	1996	2024	9	Runners-up (2012)	18
Italy	Four best third place teams	11 May 2025	2nd	1998		1	Eleventh place (1998)	20
Romania	Four best third place teams	11 May 2025	4th	1994	2024	2	Ninth place (1996)	25
Switzerland	Four best third place teams	11 May 2025	6th	2002	2024	2	Twelfth place (2004)	15
Ukraine	Four best third place teams	11 May 2025	8th	2000	2022	1	Eleventh place (2002)	30
