= Dumčius =

- Lithuanian surname
- m.: Dumčius
- f.: (unmarried): Dumčiūtė
- f.: (married): Dumčienė

Dumčius is a Lithuanian surname. Notable people with this surname include:

- Arimantas Dumčius (born 1940), Lithuanian cardiac surgeon, politician and public figure
- Mindaugas Dumčius (born 1995), Lithuanian handball player
