= Markus Kolar =

Austrian handball player (born 1984)

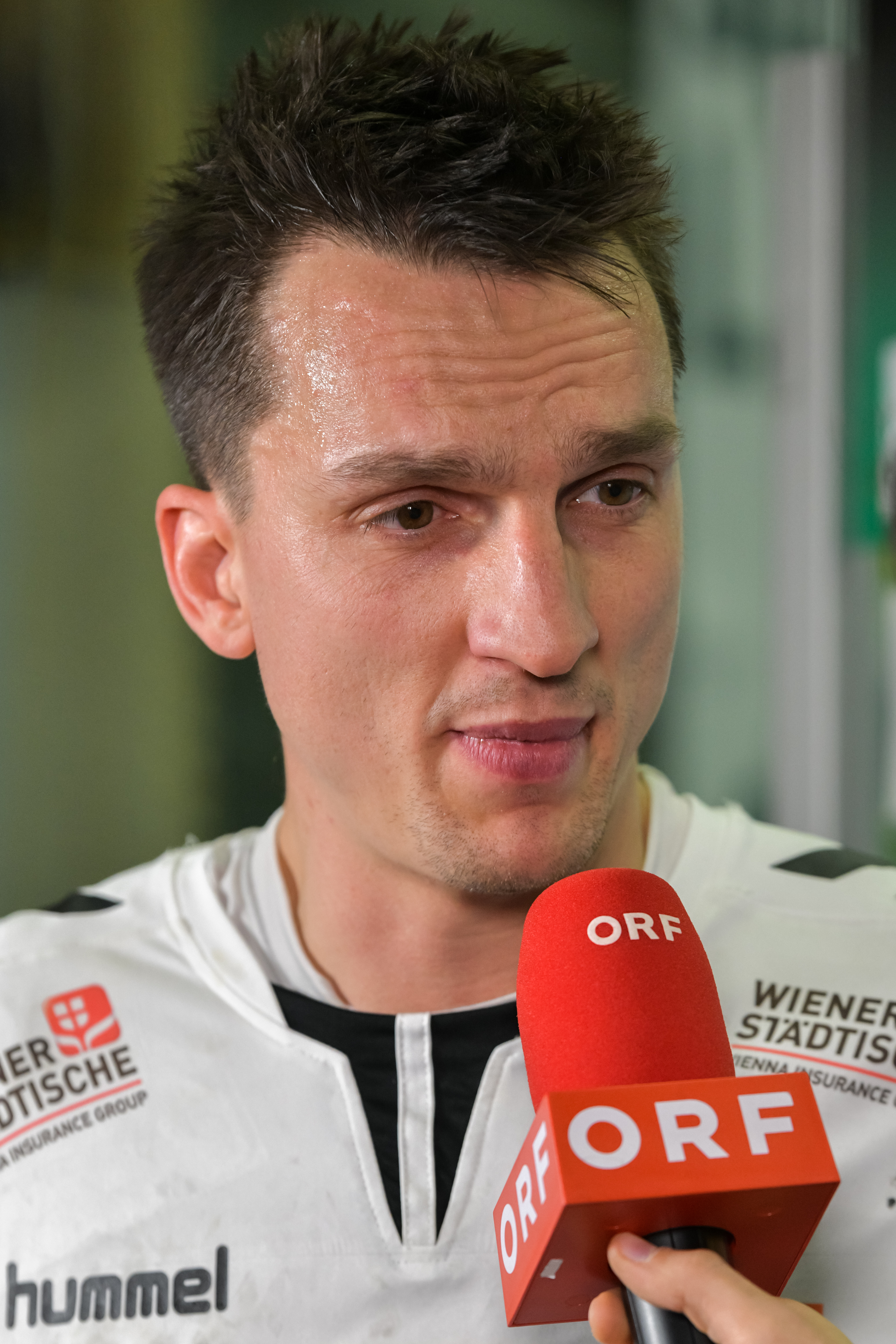

Personal information
- Nationality: Austrian
- Born: 12 October 1984 (age 42) Vienna, Austria
- Height: 1.95 m (6 ft 5 in)

Sport
- Sport: Handball
- Position: Left back
- Current club: Fivers Margareten
- Number: 59

Youth career
- Years: Team
- 1997–2003: Fivers Margareten

Senior clubs
- Years: Team
- 2003–: Fivers Margareten
National team
Years	Team	Apps	(Gls)
–	Austria	38	(71)

Markus Kolar (born 12 October 1984) is an Austrian handball player for Fivers Margareten and the Austrian national team.
