= HC Elbflorenz 2006 =

German handball club

HC Elbflorenz
- Full name: Handball-Club ELBFLORENZ 2006 e. V.
- Founded: 2006; 20 years ago
- Arena: BallsportArena, Dresden
- Capacity: 2,581
- President: Uwe Saegeling
- Head coach: André Haber
- League: 2nd Handball-Bundesliga
- 2024-25: 5th
- Club colours

HC Elbflorenz 2006 (officially Handball-Club ELBFlORENZE 2006. e.V.) is a handball club from Dresden, Germany. Since 2017 they have played in the 2nd Bundesliga.

== History ==
The club was founded in 2006 with the explicit goal to reach the Handball-Bundesliga. In their first season they played in the Oberliga Sachsen.

In the 2011-12 season the team was promoted to the 3. Liga. In 2017 the club was promoted to the 2nd Bundesliga.

== Team ==
=== Current squad ===
Squad for the 2026–27 season

Goalkeepers

- (Finland) Oliver Sandin

Left Wingers

- (Germany) Nils Fuhrmann
- (Finland) Oliver Ahlbäck

Right Wingers

- (Czech Republic) Dominik Skopár

Line players

Left Backs

- (Germany) Julius Meyer-Siebert
- (Czech Republic) Daniel Bláha

Central Backs
Right Backs

- (Germany) Anton Preussner
- (Norway) Viktor Petersen Norberg

=== Transfers ===
Transfers for the 2026–27 season

Joining

- (Czech Republic) Dominik Skopár (RW) from (Czech Republic) Talent Plzeň
- (Czech Republic) Daniel Bláha (LB) from (Czech Republic) Talent Plzeň
- (Finland) Oliver Ahlbäck (LW) from (Finland) Dicken
- (Germany) Nils Fuhrmann (LW) from (Germany) 1. VfL Potsdam
- (Germany) Julius Meyer-Siebert (LB) from (Germany) TuS Ferndorf

Leaving

- (Turkey) Doruk Pehlivan (LB) to (Germany) HSG Wetzlar
- (Germany) Lukas Wucherpfennig (RW) to (United States) Los Angeles THC
- (Germany) Timo Stoyke (LP) to (Germany) TuS Ferndorf
- (Germany) Vincent Klepp (RW) to (Germany) Eintracht Hildesheim
- (Germany) Jannik Dutschke (LW)
- (Germany) Anton Voss (RW) loan back to (Germany) SC DHfK Leipzig
- (Germany) Lauro Pichiri (LB) loan back to (Germany) Füchse Berlin

=== Transfer History ===
Transfers for the 2025–26 season

Joining

- (Norway) Viktor Petersen Norberg (RB) from (Germany) HSG Wetzlar
- (Germany) Anton Preussner (RB) from (Germany) Füchse Berlin
- (Germany) Anton Voss (RW) on loan from (Germany) SC DHfK Leipzig
- (Germany) Lauro Pichiri (LB) on loan from (Germany) Füchse Berlin

Leaving

- (Lithuania) Mindaugas Dumčius (RB) to (Austria) Bregenz Handball
- (Germany) Julian Possehl (RB) to (Germany) Sportfreunde Loxten
- (Germany) Justin Döbler (LW) to (Germany) EHV Aue
- (Germany) Maurice Niestroj (LB) to (Denmark) DHK Flensborg

== Notable former players ==
- (Germany) Maximilian Janke
- (Lithuania) Mindaugas Dumčius
- (France) Robin Cantegrel
- (Turkey) Doruk Pehlivan
- (Czech Republic) Marek Vančo
- (Czech Republic) Michal Kasal
- (Hungary) Ádám Bajorhegyi
- (Norway) Henrik Ruud Tovås
