= Lukas Hutecek =

Austrian handball player (born 2000)

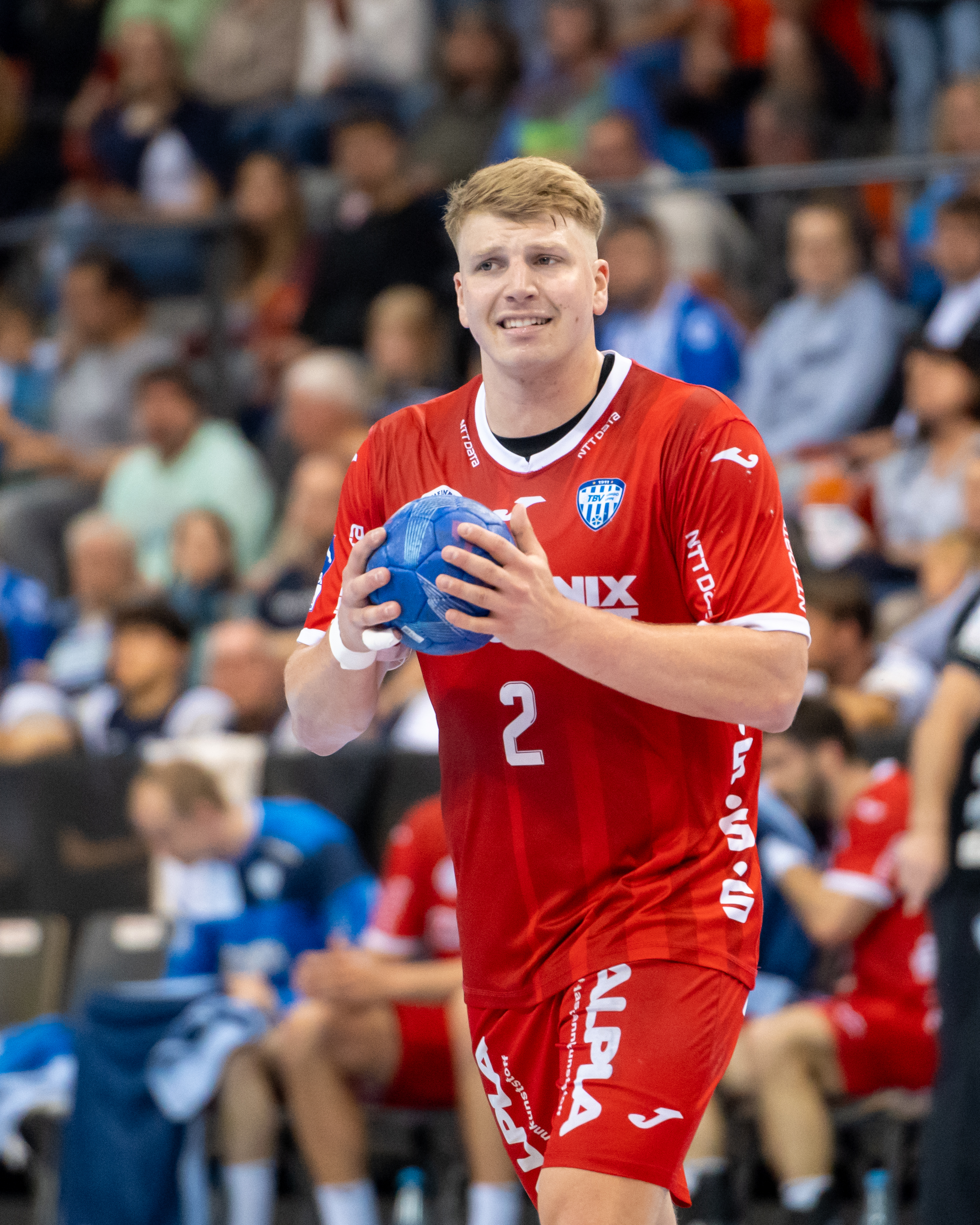

Personal information
- Nationality: Austrian
- Born: 2 July 2000 (age 26) Horn, Austria
- Height: 1.90 m (6 ft 3 in)

Sport
- Sport: Handball
- Position: Left back
- Current club: TBV Lemgo
- Number: 2

Youth career
- Years: Team
- –2015: UHC Eggenburg
- 2015–2016: Fivers Margareten
- 2015–2016: → UHC Hollabrunn (loan)

Senior clubs
- Years: Team
- 2016–2021: Fivers Margareten
- 2021–: TBV Lemgo Lippe
National team
Years	Team	Apps	(Gls)
2019–	Austria	73	(524)
- Updated on 26 August 2025

Lukas Hutecek (born 2 July 2000) is an Austrian handball player for the German club TBV Lemgo and the Austrian national team.

== Career ==
He started playing handball at UHC Eggenburg, where his father was a coach. His brother, Sebastian Hutecek is also a handballer. In 2015 he joined the youth team of Handballclub Fivers Margareten. He was then loaned to UHC Hollabrunn, where he played for their U-20 team. In 2017 he was promoted to the first team. In his first season he won the Austrian Bundesliga in 2017/2018, and in 2020 he won the Austrian Pokal with the club. In 2020-21 he was named Austrian player of the year.

In February 2021 he signed a contract with the German club TBV Lemgo from the 2021–22 season onwards.

=== National team ===
On 6 January 2020 he player his first game for the Austrian National Team. At the 2021 World Men's Handball Championship he scored 28 goals in 7 games, when Austria finished 26th. At the 2025 World Championship he scored 21 goals in 6 games. Austria finished 17th at the tournament.
