= Christoph Edelmüller =

Austrian handball player (born 1981)

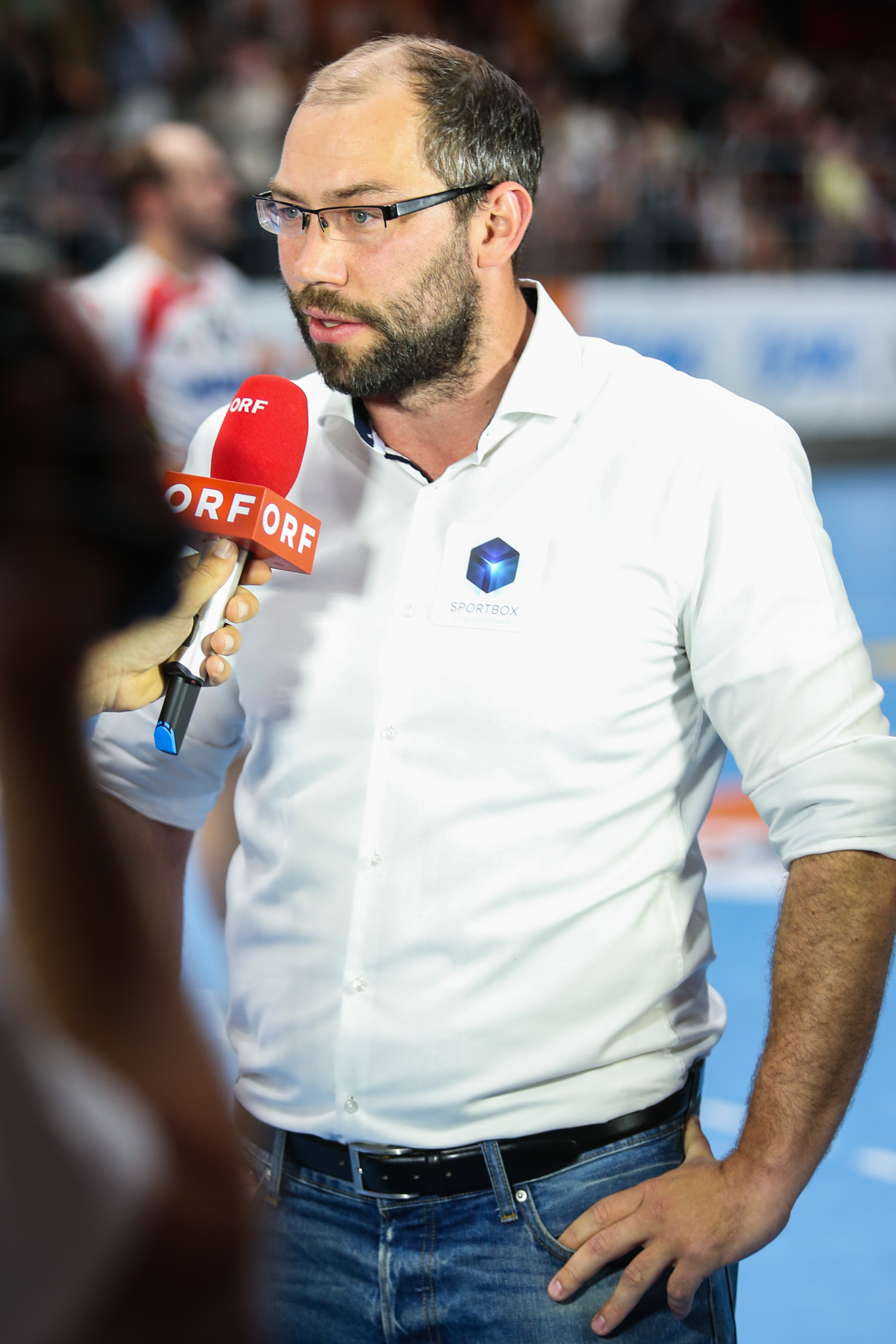

Personal information
- Nationality: Austrian
- Born: 15 October 1981 (age 45) Vienna, Austria
- Height: 1.82 m (6 ft 0 in)

Sport
- Sport: Handball
- Position: Pivot

Youth career
- Years: Team
- 1992–1999: SG Handball West Wien

Senior clubs
- Years: Team
- 1999–2004: SG Handball West Wien
- 2004–2005: H 43 Lund
- 2005–2008: SG Handball West Wien
- 2008–2014: Fivers Margareten
National team
Years	Team	Apps	(Gls)
2012–2014	Austria	25	(23)

Christoph Edelmüller (born 15 October 1981) is an Austrian former handball player for Fivers Margareten, SG Handball West Wien and Swedish H 43 Lund. He also played for the Austrian national team.

He represented Austria at the 2014 European Men's Handball Championship.

With Fivers, he won the Austrian cup in 2009, 2012 and 2013 and in 2011 he won the Austrian Championship with the club.

== Season stats ==
Season	Team	League	Goals	Penalty goals	Outfield goals
2008/09	Handballclub Fivers Margareten	HLA	108	0	108
2009/10	Handballclub Fivers Margareten	HLA	126	0	126
2010/11	Handballclub Fivers Margareten	HLA	149	0	149
2011/12	Handballclub Fivers Margareten	HLA	159	49/64	110
2012/13	Handballclub Fivers Margareten	HLA	135	5/9	130
2013/14	Handballclub Fivers Margareten	HLA	146	24/29	122
2008–2014	Total	HLA	823	78/102 (76 %)	745
