= David Brandfellner =

Austrian handball player (born 1992)

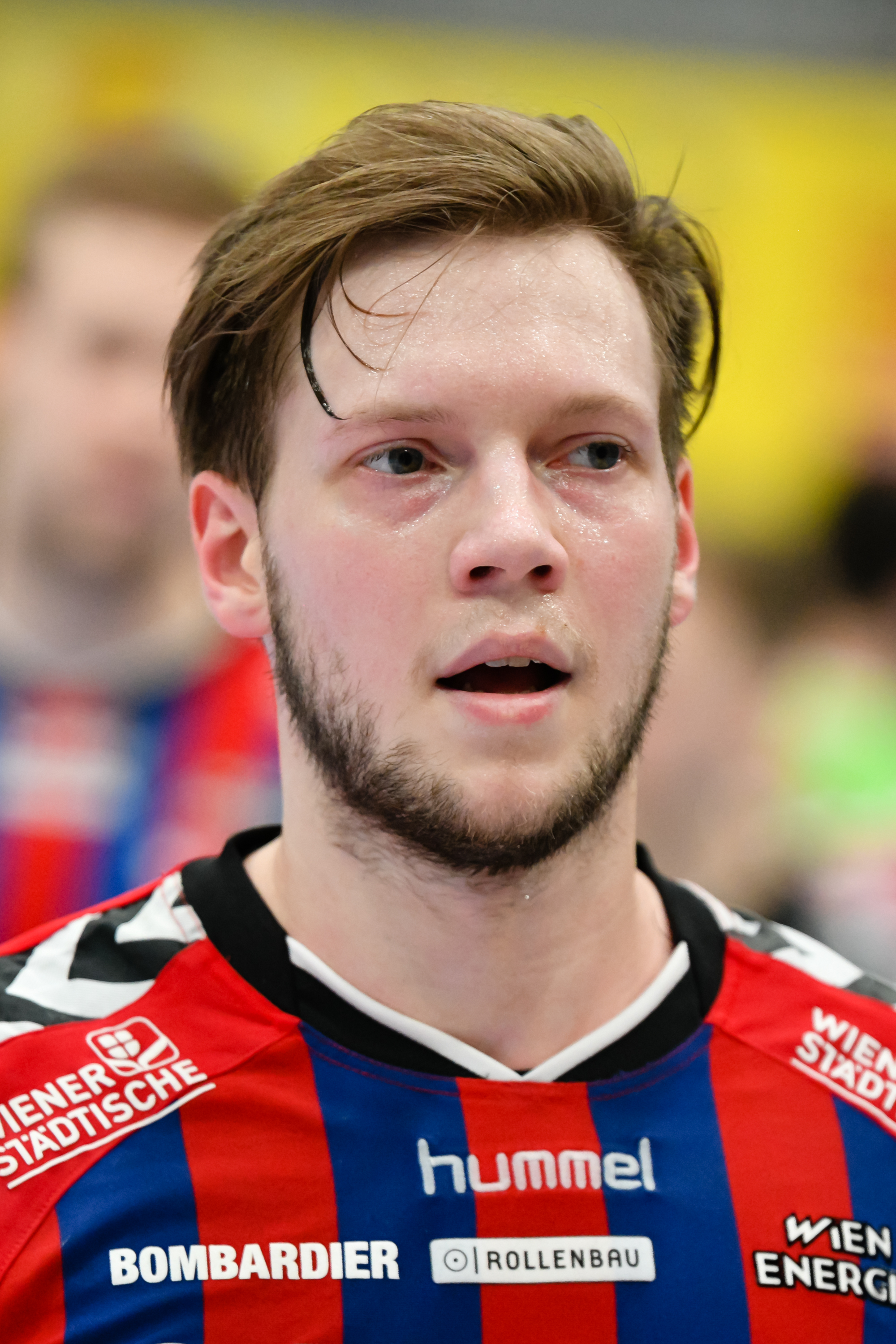

Personal information
- Nationality: Austrian
- Born: 20 November 1992 (age 33) Vienna, Austria
- Height: 1.79 m (5 ft 10 in)

Sport
- Sport: Handball
- Position: Right wing
- Current club: HC Fivers Margareten
- Number: 85

Youth career
- Years: Team
- 2004-2010: HC Fivers Margareten

Senior clubs
- Years: Team
- 2007-2023: HC Fivers Margareten
National team
Years	Team	Apps	(Gls)
2011-2023	Austria	11	(13)

David Brandfellner (born 20 November 1992) is an Austrian former handball player. He played his entire career for HC Fivers Margareten. He also featured in the Austrian national team.

He made his debut for the senior team aslready at the age of 15. With Fivers he won the Austrian Championship in 2011, 2016 and 2018. In 2011 he was named rookie of the year. He retired after the 2022–23 season.

Brandfellner made his debut for the Austrian national team on 20 December 2011 against Algeria. He represented Austria at the 2020 European Men's Handball Championship. Because of illness he did however only play in the opening game.

== Seasonal statistics ==
Season	Team	League	Goals	Penalty goals	Outfield goals
2008/09	Handballclub Fivers Margareten	HLA	2	0	2
2009/10	Handballclub Fivers Margareten	HLA	10	0	10
2010/11	Handballclub Fivers Margareten	HLA	106	0	106
2011/12	Handballclub Fivers Margareten	HLA	95	0	95
2012/13	Handballclub Fivers Margareten	HLA	9	0	9
2013/14	Handballclub Fivers Margareten	HLA	89	0	89
2014/15	Handballclub Fivers Margareten	HLA	89	0	89
2015/16	Handballclub Fivers Margareten	HLA	92	0	92
2016/17	Handballclub Fivers Margareten	HLA	110	0	110
2017/18	Handballclub Fivers Margareten	HLA	83	0	83
2018/19	Handballclub Fivers Margareten	HLA	102	0	102
2019/20	The season was cancelled due to the COVID-19 Pandemic				
2020/21	Handballclub Fivers Margareten	HLA	73	0	73
2008–2019	Total	HLA	860	0	860
