= Henrik Ruud Tovås =

Norwegian handball player (born 1987)

Personal information
- Nationality: Norwegian
- Born: 5 March 1987 (age 39) Oslo, Norway
- Height: 193 cm (76 in)

Sport
- Sport: Handball
- Current club: Bækkelagets SK
- Number: 32

Youth career
- Years: Team
- –: Langhus IL

Senior clubs
- Years: Team
- –2013: Haslum HK
- 2013–2015: SC DHfK Leipzig
- 2015–2017: HC Elbflorenz 2006
- 2017–: Bækkelagets SK
National team
Years	Team	Apps	(Gls)
2011–2013	Norway	11	(0)

Henrik Ruud Tovås (born 5 March 1987) is a Norwegian handball player.

He hails from Langhus and played as a goalkeeper for Langhus IL in his youth, later SK Njård, Fet HK, Haslum HK (several periods), Haugaland HK, HC Leipzig, HC Elbflorenz Dresden and Bækkelagets SK until retiring in 2019. He was capped 11 times for Norway between 2011 and 2013.

After retiring he started a career in Société Générale.
