= Handballclub Fivers Margareten =

Austrian handball club

- Nickname: Fivers
- Short name: HC Fivers
- Founded: 1919; 107 years ago
- Arena: Sporthalle Margareten, Wien
- Capacity: 672
- President: Eduard Winter
- Head coach: Peter Eckl
- League: Handball Liga Austria
- Club colours
Home	Away

Handballclub Fivers Margareten is a handball club from Wien, Austria. They currently compete in the Handball Liga Austria.

Location of Handballclub Fivers Margareten

== History ==
The handball club originates from Margareten, Wien's 5th district, hence the name Fivers. The progenior club Allgemeiner Turnverein was founded in 1894, and in 1919 WAT Margareten was founded. With the rise of fascism in Austria, the club was banned in 1934 due to their strong social democratic connections. It was refounded after the 2nd World War.

During its history, it reached the Austrian First Division for the first time in 1982, and since then it has been continuously in the national elite. In 1999 they won their first title, the Austrian Cup. They won the championship 3 times (2011, 2016, 2018), they were cup winners 8 times (1999, 2009, 2012, 2013, 2015, 2016, 2017, 2021) and they won the Super Cup 4 times (2013, 2014, 2015, 2020).

== Crest, colours, supporters ==
=== Kit manufacturers ===
Period	Kit manufacturer
– 2015	(Germany) Adidas
2015 – present	(Denmark) Hummel

=== Kits ===
HOME
2011–13	2013–14	2014–15	2015–17	2017–18	2022–23

AWAY
2011–13	2013–14	2014–15	2015–17	2017–19	2019–20	2022–23

== Sports Hall information ==
- Name: – Sporthalle Margareten
- City: – Wien
- Capacity: – 1200
- Address: – Hollgasse 3, 1050 Wien, Austria

== Team ==
=== Current squad ===
Squad for the 2022–23 season

Handballclub Fivers Margareten

Goalkeepers

- 51 (Austria) Wolfgang Filzwieser
- 52 (Austria) Boris Tanic
- 56 (Austria) Jan David

Left Wingers

- 15 (Austria) Eric Damböck
- 35 (Austria) Lukas Gangel
- 65 (Austria) Philipp Gangel

Right Wingers

- 57 (Austria) Jakob Nigg
- 75 (Austria) Maximilian Riede
- 85 (Austria) David Brandfellner

Line Players

- 45 (Austria) Florian Heizinger
- 50 (Austria) Vincent Schweiger
- 58 (Austria) Leander Brenneis

Central Backs

- 53 (Austria) Fabio Schuh
- 54 (Austria) Fabian Glätzl
- 55 (Austria) Marin Martinović

Left Backs

- 25 (Austria) Marc-Andre Haunold
- 59 (Austria) Markus Kolar
- 95 (Austria) Thomas Seidl

Right Backs

- 5 (Austria) Christian Saric

=== Technical staff ===
- Head Coach: (Austria) Peter Eckl
- Assistant Coach: (Austria) Michael Gangel
- Goalkeeping Coach: (Ukraine) (Austria) Sergiy Bilyk
- Coach: (Austria) Herbert Jonas
- Physiotherapist: (Austria) Birgit Gamper
- Masseur: (Austria) Monika Neckam

=== Transfers ===
Transfers for the 2026–27 season

Joining

Leaving

- (Austria) Sergej Novakovic (GK) to (Spain) FC Barcelona
- (Austria) Lorin Lichtblau (LW) to (Austria) WAT Atzgersdorf
- (Austria) Maximilian Riede (RW) (retires)

=== Transfer History ===
Transfers for the 2025–26 season

Joining

- (Ukraine) Oleksii Novikov (GK) from (Lithuania) HC Pasvalio Pieno žvaigždės
- (Austria) Matthias Rattensperger (RW) from (Austria) Union Korneuburg

Leaving

- (Austria) Leon Bergmann (GK) to (Switzerland) Kadetten Schaffhausen
- (Austria) Jakob Nigg (RW) to (Germany) TVB Stuttgart
- (Austria) Markus Kolar (LB) (retires)
- (Austria) Thomas Seidl (LB) (retires)
- (Austria) Leander Brenneis (LP) (retires)
- (Austria) Jan David (GK) (retires)

== Previous Squads ==
2020–2021 Team
Shirt No	Nationality	Player	Birth Date	Position
5	Austria	Tobias Wagner	26 March 1995 (age 31)	Line Player
15	Austria	Eric Damböck	6 September 1999 (age 27)	Left Winger
25	Austria	Nikola Stevanovic	17 April 1998 (age 28)	Right Back
35	Austria	Lukas Gangel	27 September 1998 (age 27)	Left Winger
45	Austria	Lukas Hutecek	2 July 2000 (age 26)	Left Back
50	Austria	Vincent Schweiger	7 October 1996 (age 29)	Line Player
51	Austria	Wolfgang Filzwieser	30 September 1984 (age 41)	Goalkeeper
52	Austria	Boris Tanic	22 June 1996 (age 30)	Goalkeeper
53	Austria	Fabio Schuh	28 September 2001 (age 24)	Central Back
54	Austria	Fabian Glätzl	6 June 1999 (age 27)	Central Back
55	Austria	Marin Martinović	10 October 1996 (age 29)	Central Back
56	Austria	Florian Haag	1 August 1997 (age 29)	Goalkeeper
57	Austria	Herbert Jonas	12 December 1988 (age 37)	Left Winger
58	Austria	Leander Brenneis	27 November 1996 (age 29)	Line Player
59	Austria	Markus Kolar	12 October 1984 (age 41)	Left Back
65	Austria	Philipp Gangel	12 May 2001 (age 25)	Left Winger
75	Austria	Maximilian Riede	15 July 1996 (age 30)	Right Winger
85	Austria	David Brandfellner	20 November 1992 (age 33)	Right Winger
95	Austria	Thomas Seidl	8 August 1992 (age 34)	Left Back

2015–2016 Team
Shirt No	Nationality	Player	Birth Date	Position
5	Croatia	Ivan Martinović	6 January 1998 (age 28)	Right Back
15	Austria	Mathias Nikolic	2 February 1991 (age 35)	Central Back
25	Austria	Markus Bezucha	4 May 1992 (age 34)	Right Winger
35	Austria	Thomas Seidl	8 August 1992 (age 34)	Left Back
45	Austria	Lukas Müller	12 December 1988 (age 37)	Left Winger
50	Austria	Richard Wöss	10 October 1986 (age 39)	Right Winger
51	UkraineAustria	Sergiy Bilyk	2 September 1970 (age 56)	Goalkeeper
52	Austria	Boris Tanic	22 June 1996 (age 30)	Goalkeeper
53	Austria	Nikola Bilyk	28 November 1996 (age 29)	Left Back
54	AustriaLithuania	Vytautas Žiūra	11 May 1979 (age 47)	Central Back
55	Lithuania	Tomas Eitutis	13 November 1981 (age 44)	Right Back
56	CroatiaAustria	Kristian Pilipović	10 December 1994 (age 31)	Goalkeeper
57	Austria	Herbert Jonas	12 December 1988 (age 37)	Left Winger
58	Austria	Tobias Wagner	26 March 1995 (age 31)	Line Player
59	Austria	Markus Kolar	12 October 1984 (age 41)	Left Back
65	Austria	Nikola Aljetic	12 October 1994 (age 31)	Line Player
75	Austria	Maximilian Riede	15 July 1996 (age 30)	Right Winger
85	Austria	David Brandfellner	20 November 1992 (age 33)	Right Winger

2008–2009 Team
Shirt No	Nationality	Player	Birth Date	Position
5	Austria	Christoph Edelmüller	15 October 1981 (age 44)	Line Player
15	Austria	Michael Gangel	25 July 1969 (age 57)	Right Back
25	Austria	Matthias Kienzer	3 July 1980 (age 46)	Right Winger
35	Austria	Denis Bolić	20 September 1988 (age 38)	Left Winger
45	Croatia	Boris Misic	21 January 1987 (age 39)	Line Player
50	Austria	Martin Abadir	19 June 1981 (age 45)	Right Back
51	UkraineAustria	Sergiy Bilyk	2 September 1970 (age 56)	Goalkeeper
52	Austria	Bastian Molecz	19 December 1987 (age 38)	Goalkeeper
53	Austria	Simon Hahn	12 February 1988 (age 38)	Right Back
54	AustriaLithuania	Vytautas Žiūra	11 May 1979 (age 47)	Central Back
55	Austria	Andreas Curik	19 June 1989 (age 37)	Right Winger
56	Austria	Thomas Bauer	24 January 1986 (age 40)	Goalkeeper
57	Austria	Herbert Jonas	12 December 1988 (age 37)	Left Winger
58	Austria	Dominique Papesch	23 September 1988 (age 37)	Left Back
59	Austria	Markus Kolar	12 October 1984 (age 41)	Left Back
65	Austria	Jörg Merten	26 June 1981 (age 45)	Left Winger
75	Austria	Christian Himmler	3 February 1986 (age 40)	Left Winger
85	Austria	Martin Fischer	8 October 1985 (age 40)	Central Back
95	AustriaLithuania	Romas Kirveliavičius	5 March 1988 (age 38)	Left Back

== Titles ==
Austrian Championship

- Winner (3): 2011, 2016, 2018

Austrian Cup

- Winner (8): 1999, 2009, 2012, 2013, 2015, 2016, 2017, 2021

Austrian Supercup

- Winner (4): 2013, 2014, 2015, 2020

EHF Cup

- Semifinalist: 1985

== EHF ranking ==
As of 5/12/2025

Rank	Team	Points
59	(Croatia) MRK Sesvete	89
60	(Slovenia) RK Trimo Trebnje	88
61	(Greece) AC Diomidis Argous	84
62	(Austria) HC Fivers Margareten	82
63	(Romania) CSM Constanța	80
64	(Slovakia) Tatran Prešov	80
65	(Spain) CB Ademar León	78

== Former club members ==
=== Notable former players ===
- (Austria) Martin Abadir (2001–2013)
- (Austria) Thomas Bauer (2003–2009)
- (Austria) (Croatia) Ivica Belas (2004–2008)
- (Austria) Nikola Bilyk (2012–2016)
- (Austria) David Brandfellner (2004–)
- (Austria) Eric Damböck (2015–)
- (Austria) Christoph Edelmüller (2008–2014)
- (Austria) Wolfgang Filzwieser (2017–)
- (Austria) Lukas Hutecek (2017–2021)
- (Austria) (Lithuania) Romas Kirveliavičius (2008–2014)
- (Austria) Roland Knabl (1998–2005)
- (Austria) Markus Kolar (1997–)
- (Austria) Marin Martinović (2015–)
- (Austria) Thomas Menzl (1989–1997)
- (Austria) Nikola Stevanovic (2014–2021)
- (Austria) Ibish Thaqi (2009–2011)
- (Austria) Björn Tyrner (1996–2008)
- (Austria) Tobias Wagner (2011–2016, 2018–2021)
- (Austria) Richard Wöss (1994–2007, 2015–2016)
- (Austria) (Lithuania) Vytautas Žiūra (2003–2009, 2010–2020)
- (Croatia) Ivan Martinović (2015–2018)
- (Croatia) (Austria) Kristian Pilipović (2009–2017)
- (Dominican Republic) (Austria) Adonis Gonzalez (2005–2016)
- (Lithuania) Tomas Eitutis (2011–2016)
- (Serbia) Stefan Jovanovic (2016–2017)
- (Turkey) Doruk Pehlivan (2018–2019)
- (Ukraine) (Austria) Sergiy Bilyk (1999–2017)

=== Former coaches ===
Seasons	Coach	Country
2002–2010	Romas Magelinskas	(Lithuania) (Austria)
2010–	Peter Eckl	(Austria)
