= Michal Kasal =

Czech handball player

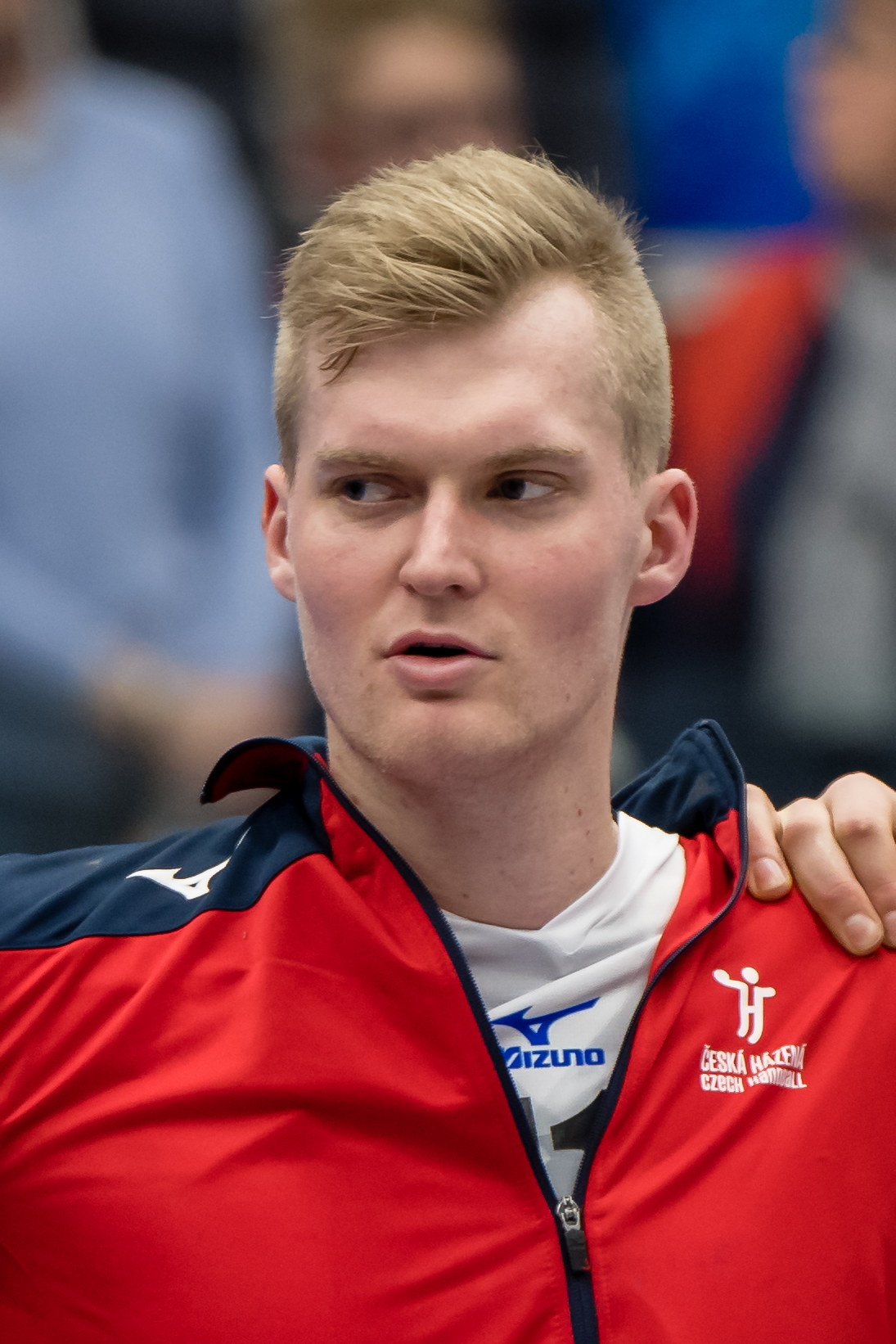

Personal information
- Nationality: Czech
- Born: 3 April 1994 (age 32) Nové Město na Moravě, Czech Republic
- Height: 2.09 m (6 ft 10 in)

Sport
- Sport: Handball
- Position: Left back
- Current club: HC Elbflorenz Dresden
- Number: 41
National team
Years	Team	Apps	(Gls)
–	Czech Republic	43	(31)

Michal Kasal (born 3 April 1994) is a Czech handball player for Elbflorenz Dresden and the Czech national team.
