= Vytautas Žiūra =

Austrian handball player (born 1979)

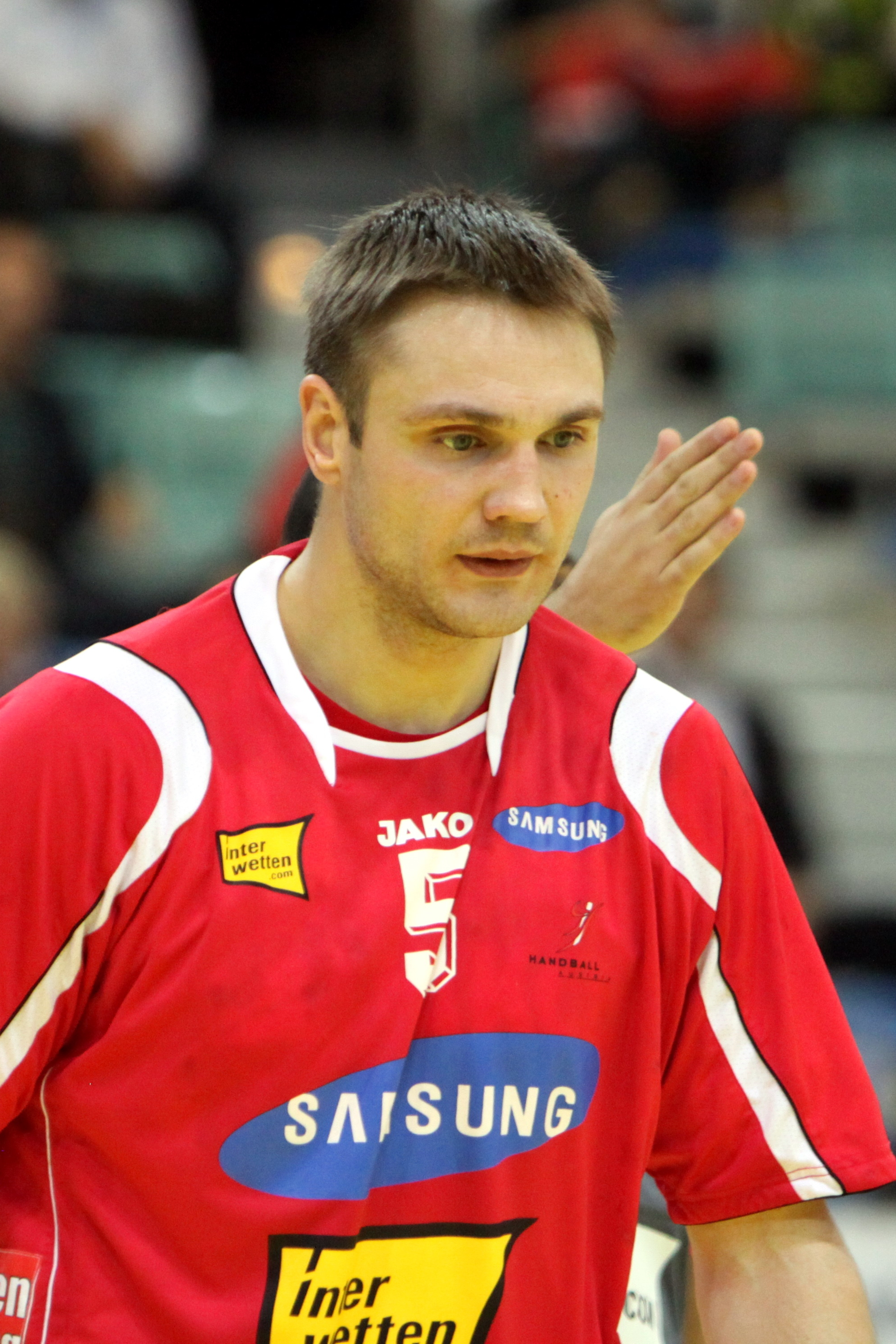

Personal information
- Nationality: Lithuanian
- Born: 11 May 1979 (age 47) Vienna, Austria
- Height: 1.89 m (6 ft 2 in)

Sport
- Sport: Handball
- Position: Centre back
- Current club: Handballclub Fivers Margareten
- Number: 54
National team
Years	Team	Apps	(Gls)
–	Austria	96	(208)

Vytautas Žiūra (born 11 May 1979) is an Austrian handball player for Handballclub Fivers Margareten and the Austrian national team.

He was born in Vienna to Lithuanian parents.
