= Doruk Pehlivan =

Turkish handball player (born 1998)

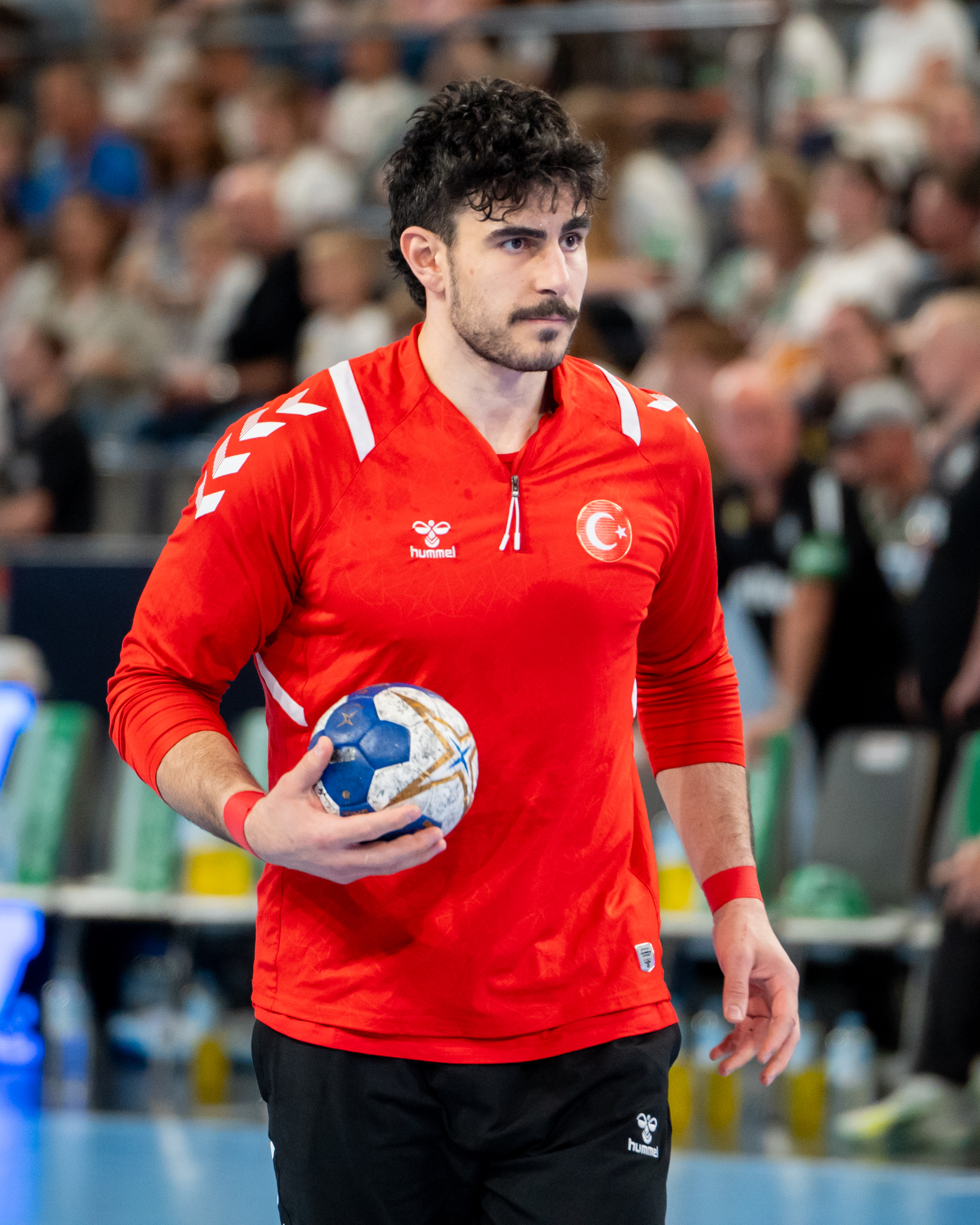

Personal information
- Nationality: Turkish
- Born: 10 July 1998 (age 28) Ankara, Turkey
- Height: 2.01 m (6 ft 7 in)

Sport
- Sport: Handball
- Position: Left back
- Current club: HC Elbflorenz
- Number: 23

Senior clubs
- Years: Team
- –2018: Maliye Piyango
- 2018–2019: Fivers Margareten
- 2019–2023: Barlinek Industria Kielce
- 2020–2023: → GWD Minden (loan)
- 2023–2026: HC Elbflorenz
- 2026–: HSG Wetzlar
National team
| Years | Team | Apps | (Gls) |
| 2017– | Turkey | 11 | (63) |

Doruk Pehlivan (born 10 July 1998) is a Turkish handball player who plays for HC Elbflorenz and the Turkish national team.
