= Nikola Bilyk =

Austrian handball player (born 1996)

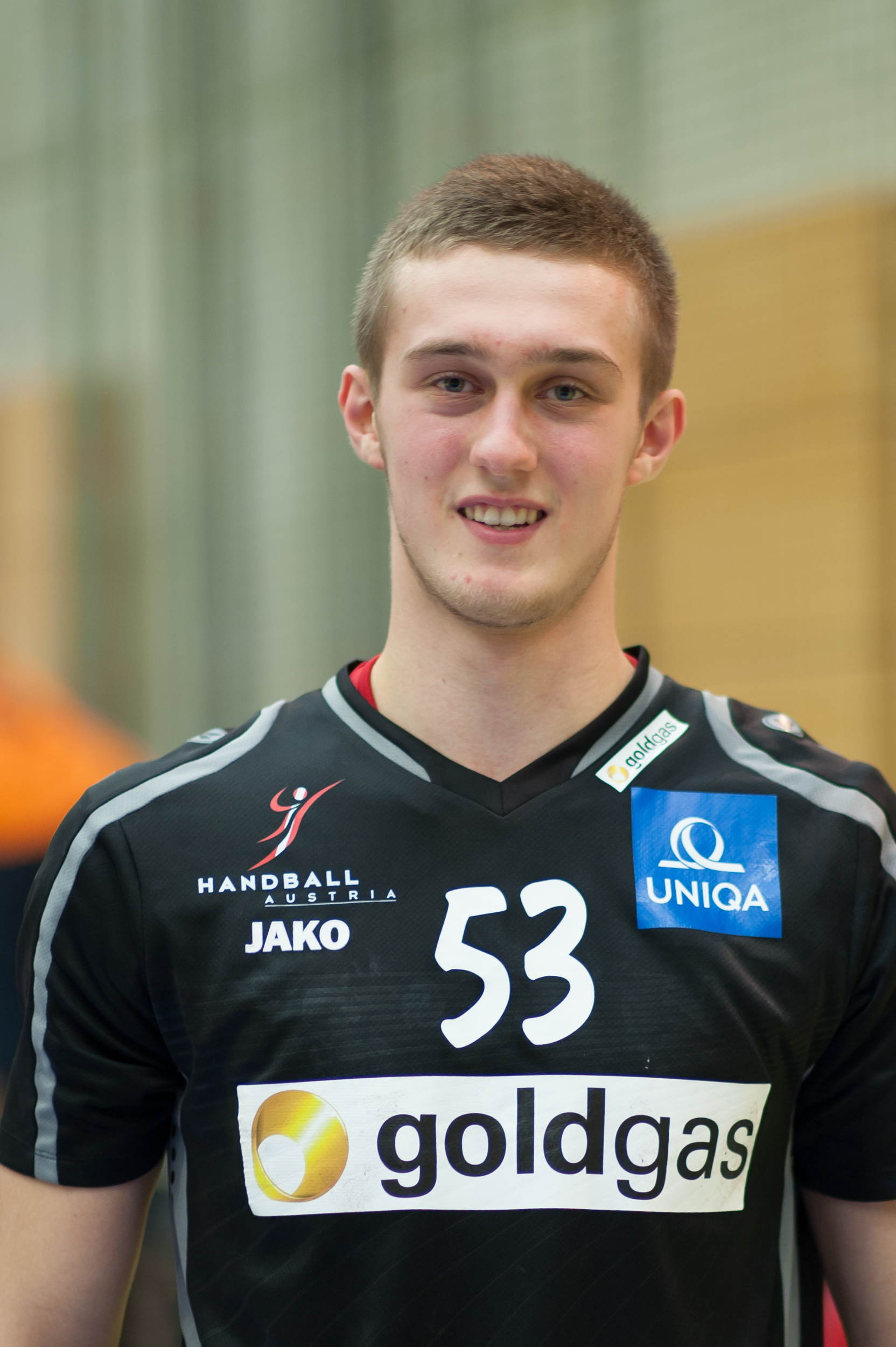

Personal information
- Nationality: Austrian
- Born: 28 November 1996 (age 29) Tunis, Tunisia
- Height: 2.00 m (6 ft 7 in)

Sport
- Sport: Handball
- Position: Left back
- Current club: THW Kiel
- Number: 53

Youth career
- Years: Team
- –2012: Fivers Margareten

Senior clubs
- Years: Team
- 2012–2016: Fivers Margareten
- 2016–2026: THW Kiel
- 2026–: HC Kriens-Luzern
National team
| Years | Team | Apps | (Gls) |
| 2014– | Austria | 100 | (445) |
- Updated on 15. January 2024

Nikola Bilyk (born 28 November 1996) is an Austrian handball player for THW Kiel and the Austria men's national handball team.

He represented Austria at the 2015 and 2019 World Championships.

He is the son of fellow handballer Serhij Bilyk and debuted in Austrian Bundesliga in December 2012, just after his 16 years birthday.
