= Tobias Wagner =

Austrian handball player (born 1995)

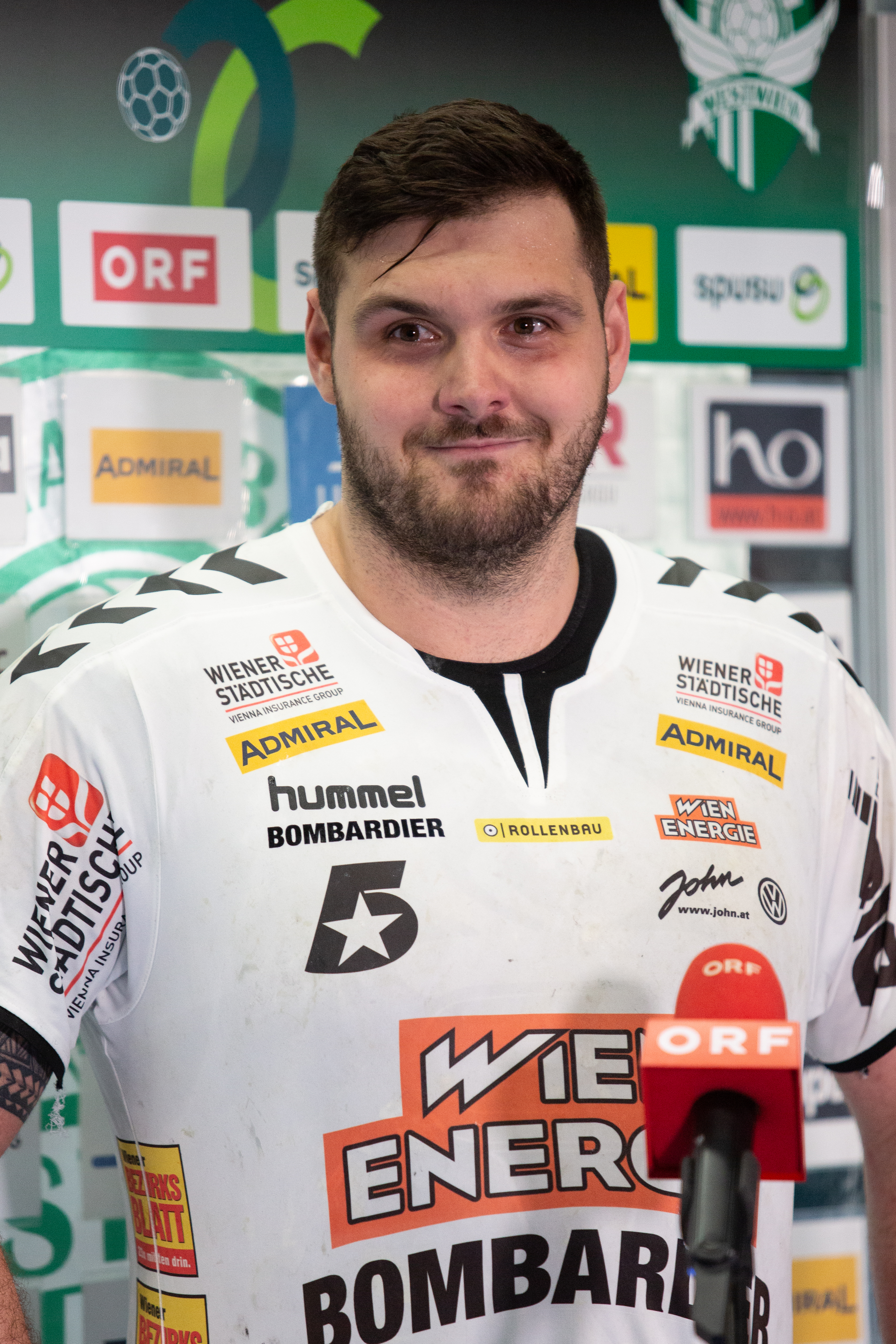

Personal information
- Nationality: Austrian
- Born: 26 March 1995 (age 31) Vienna, Austria
- Height: 1.98 m (6 ft 6 in)

Sport
- Sport: Handball
- Position: Pivot

Youth career
- Years: Team
- –2011: Perchtoldsdorf Devils
- 2011–2014: Fivers Margareten

Senior clubs
- Years: Team
- 2013–2016: Fivers Margareten
- 2016–2018: Balingen-Weilstetten
- 2018–2021: Fivers Margareten
- 2021–2023: Fenix Toulouse
- 2023–2024: Bregenz
- 2024–2025: Erlangen
- 2025–2026: Limoges
- 2026: Partizan
National team
Years	Team	Apps	(Gls)
2015–present	Austria	90	(220)
- Updated on 31. December 2023

Tobias Wagner (born 26 March 1995) is an Austrian handball player who last played for Partizan. He also represents the Austrian national team.

He participated at the 2018 European Men's Handball Championship.

In 2016 he won the ÖHB-Cup and the Handball Liga Austria with Handballclub Fivers Margareten. In 2016/2017 and in 2017/2018 he played for the German 2. Bundesliga club HBW Balingen-Weilstetten, before returning to the Austrian league.

== Honours ==
Fivers Margareten

- Austrian League: 2015–16
- Austrian Cup: 2014–15, 2015–16, 2020–21
- Austrian Supercup: 2015, 2020

Partizan

- Serbian Supercup: 2026
- All-Serbian Cup: 2026
