= Mindaugas Dumčius =

Lithuanian handball player (born 1995)

Personal information
- Nationality: Lithuanian
- Born: 6 July 1995 (age 31) Klaipėda, Lithuania
- Height: 1.92 m (6 ft 4 in)

Sport
- Sport: Handball
- Position: Right back
- Current club: Bregenz Handball
- Number: 13

Senior clubs
- Years: Team
- 2011–2016: Dragūnas Klaipėda
- 2016–2017: HC Akureyri
- 2017–2019: EHV Aue
- 2019–2025: HC Elbflorenz 2006 e.V.
- 2025–: Bregenz Handball
National team
Years	Team	Apps	(Gls)
2013–	Lithuania	50	(145)
- Updated on 28 August 2025

Mindaugas Dumčius (born 6 July 1995) is a Lithuanian handball player who currently plays for the Austrian club Bregenz Handball and the Lithuania national team.

He started his career at Dragūnas Klaipėda, where he won the Lithuanian Championship in every season from 2010 to 2015, as well as the Lithuanian Cup in 2010, 2011 and 2015. He then joined Icelandic HC Akureyri. In 2017 he joined EHV Aue in the second tier 2nd Bundesliga. In 2019, he was voted the best Lithuanian handball player of the year. The same seasaon he joined league rivals HC Elbflorenz 2006. In 2025 he moved to Austrian Bregenz Handball.

He represented Lithuania at the 2022 European Men's Handball Championship, where they finished 21st. He scored 9 goals in three matches at the tournament.
