= Victor Alonso =

Spanish handball player (born 1990)

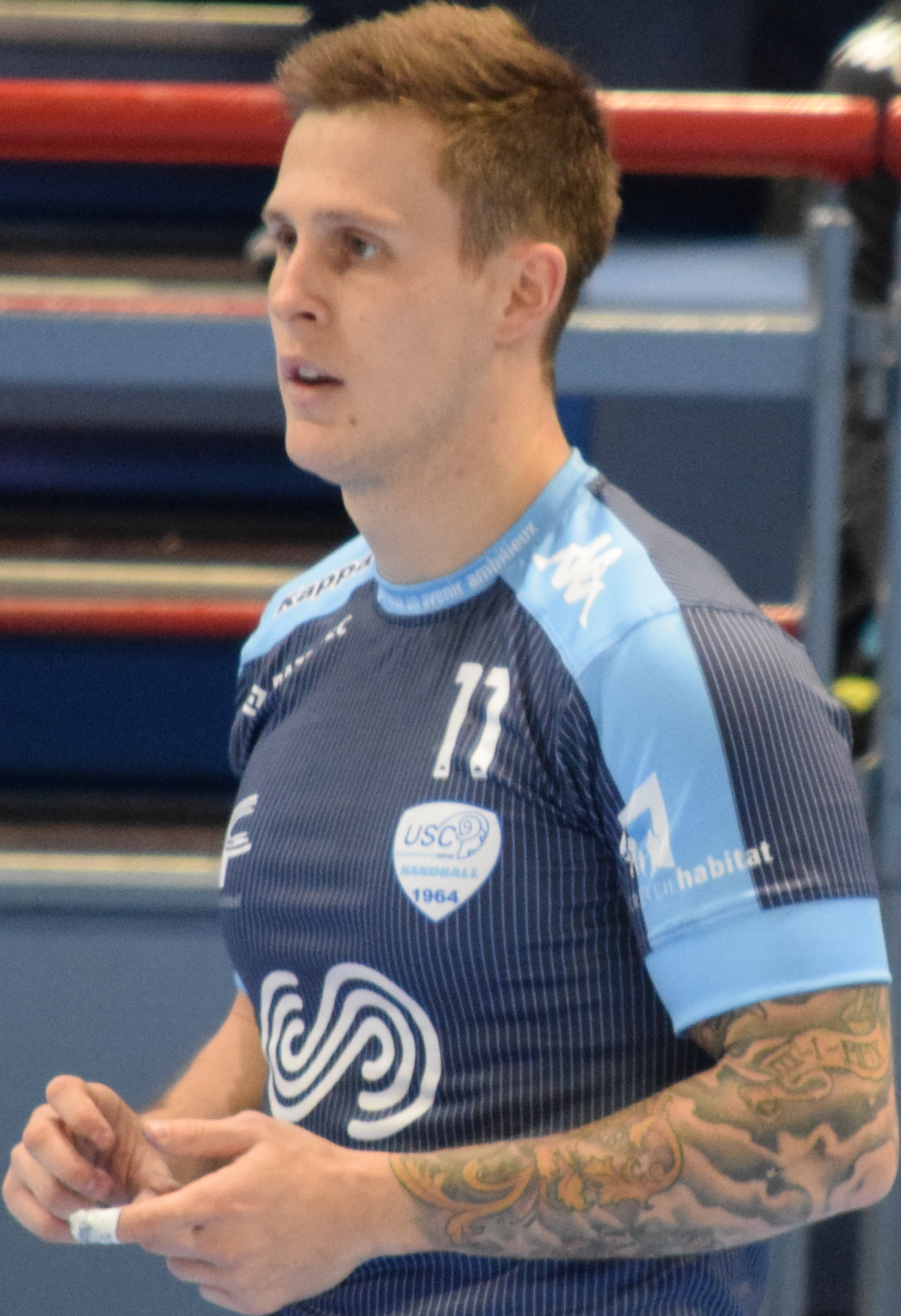
- Alonso with US Créteil in 2016.

Personal information
- Full name: Victor Alonso García
- Nationality: Spanish
- Born: 9 March 1990 (age 36) Gijón, Spain
- Height: 1.88 m (6 ft 2 in)

Sport
- Sport: Handball
- Position: Right back/wing
- Current club: KH Rahoveci
- Number: 73

Senior clubs
- Years: Team
- 2008–2009: Portland San Antonio
- 2009–2010: Oviedo
- 2010–2013: Valladolid
- 2010–2011: → BM Nava
- 2013–2014: Ademar León
- 2014–2015: Știința Dedeman Bacău
- 2015–2018: US Créteil
- 2018–2020: Ángel Ximénez P. Genil
- 2020–2021: Besa Famgas
- 2021: Ness Ziona
- 2021–2023: Besa Famgas
- 2023: Pallamano Romagna
- 2023: RK Vardar 1961
- 2023–: KH Rahoveci
National team
Years	Team	Apps	(Gls)
2014–2015	Spain	2	(3)

Victor Alonso García (born 9 March 1990) is a Spanish handball player for KH Rahoveci.

He reached fifth place with Ademar León in the 2013–14 season of ASOBAL, scoring 98 goals in 18 games for its team.

On 5 November 2020, García declared that he has started to adjust after the transfer to Besa Famgas and that he is feeling at home, while does not exclude the possibility to play for the Kosovo national team, if the handball federation and national team's technical staff deems it necessary.

== Achievements ==
- Copa del Rey:
  - Finalist: 2011
- Kosovar Handball Superliga:
  - Winners: 2021, 2022
- Kosovo Cup:
  - Winners: 2021, 2022
