= Kastriot Jupa =

Kosovan handball player

Personal information
- Nationality: Kosovan
- Born: 17 December 1992 (age 33) Gjakovë, FR Yugoslavia
- Height: 1.88 m (6 ft 2 in)

Sport
- Sport: Handball
- Position: Pivot

Senior clubs
- Years: Team
- –: Vëllaznimi
- 2012: Besa Famgas
- 2012–2013: Prishtina
- 2013: Besa Famgas
- 2013–2014: Prishtina
- 2014–2022: Besa Famgas
- 2022–: LHC Cottbus
National team
Years	Team	Apps	(Gls)
2014–	Kosovo	62	(203)

Kastriot Jupa (born 17 December 1992) is a Kosovan professional handball player for LHC Cottbus and the Kosovan national team. He is the most capped player of the Kosovan national team.

== Honours ==
Besa

- Superliga: 2012, 2014, 2015, 2016, 2017, 2018, 2019, 2020, 2021, 2022
- Kosovo Cup: 2012, 2014, 2015, 2016, 2017, 2018, 2020, 2021, 2022

Prishtina

- Superliga: 2013
