= 2028 European Men's Handball Championship qualification =

2028 EHF European Men's Handball Championship qualification
Tournament details
- Dates: 10 January 2025 – 9 May 2027
- Teams: 36

The 2028 European Men's Handball Championship qualification tournament is a Handball competition that was played from January 2025 to 9 May 2027 to determine the 20 EHF member men's national teams that will join the automatically qualified teams in the final tournament. Alongside the qualifiers, the EHF Euro Cup also takes place.

A total of 36 EHF member associations entered the qualifying process alongside the four teams in the EHF Euro Cup.

== Format ==
Prior to the qualification, four teams were automatically qualified:

- Portugal, Spain and Switzerland as co-hosts;
- The best-placed team from the 2026 European Men's Handball Championship, other than the 2028 tournament co-hosts.

The remaining eligible teams contest a qualification tournament to determine the teams securing the remaining 20 places in the final tournament. The qualification tournament consists of three rounds: qualification phase 1, promotion round, and qualification phase 2.

- Qualification phase 1:
  - Four teams;
  - Round-robin tournament format;
  - The two top-ranked teams after all matches played advances to the promotion round.
- Promotion round:
  - Six teams:
    - Qualification phase 1 winner,
    - Four of the lowest-ranked fourth-placed teams of the previous cycle qualifiers round,
    - Best European team at the 2025 IHF Emerging Nations Championship;
  - Two-legged tie format;
  - Three aggregate winners advance to the qualification phase 2.
- Qualification phase 2:
  - Thirty-two teams:
    - Three promotion round winners
    - Remaining eight teams eliminated in the previous cycle qualifiers round
    - Twenty teams that participated in the 2026 European Championship, but did not qualify directly to the 2028 final tournament
  - Round-robin tournament format: eight groups of four teams;
  - Group winners, group runners-up, and the four best third-placed teams qualify for the final tournament.

== Qualification Phase 1 ==
Since only four teams participate in this round, no draw was needed.

=== Standings ===
Pos	Team	Pld	W	D	L	GF	GA	GD	Pts	Qualification
1	Great Britain	3	2	1	0	92	67	+25	5	Promotion round
2	Cyprus	3	2	0	1	91	67	+24	4	Promotion round
3	Bulgaria (H)	3	1	1	1	78	62	+16	3	
4	Malta	3	0	0	3	45	110	−65	0	

Source: EHF
Rules for classification: 1) points; 2) head-to-head points; 3) head-to-head goal difference; 4) head-to-head number of goals scored; 5) goal difference.
(H) Hosts

=== Results ===
All times are local (UTC+2).

10 January 2025; 15:00	Great Britain	37–14	Malta	Palace of Culture and Sports, Varna; Attendance: 50; Referees: Bujupi, Bujupi (KOS)
10 January 2025; 15:00	Pereira 6	(18–7)	three players 2	Palace of Culture and Sports, Varna; Attendance: 50; Referees: Bujupi, Bujupi (KOS)
10 January 2025; 15:00	3× (suspension)	Report	1× (yellow card) 4× (suspension)	Palace of Culture and Sports, Varna; Attendance: 50; Referees: Bujupi, Bujupi (KOS)

10 January 2025; 17:30	Cyprus	22–21	Bulgaria	Palace of Culture and Sports, Varna; Attendance: 600; Referees: Pirvu, Potirniche (ROU)
10 January 2025; 17:30	Karkalatos 6	(9–11)	three players 5	Palace of Culture and Sports, Varna; Attendance: 600; Referees: Pirvu, Potirniche (ROU)
10 January 2025; 17:30	1× (yellow card) 4× (suspension)	Report	5× (suspension)	Palace of Culture and Sports, Varna; Attendance: 600; Referees: Pirvu, Potirniche (ROU)

11 January 2025; 15:00	Cyprus	26–28	Great Britain	Palace of Culture and Sports, Varna; Attendance: 150; Referees: Pirvu, Potirniche (ROU)
11 January 2025; 15:00	Argyrou 6	(11–15)	Hirel 6	Palace of Culture and Sports, Varna; Attendance: 150; Referees: Pirvu, Potirniche (ROU)
11 January 2025; 15:00	2× (yellow card) 3× (suspension)	Report	1× (yellow card) 4× (suspension) 1× (red card)	Palace of Culture and Sports, Varna; Attendance: 150; Referees: Pirvu, Potirniche (ROU)

11 January 2025; 17:30	Bulgaria	30–13	Malta	Palace of Culture and Sports, Varna; Attendance: 1,000; Referees: Bujupi, Bujupi (KOS)
11 January 2025; 17:30	Yorgov 9	(13–5)	Harrison 4	Palace of Culture and Sports, Varna; Attendance: 1,000; Referees: Bujupi, Bujupi (KOS)
11 January 2025; 17:30	2× (suspension)	Report		Palace of Culture and Sports, Varna; Attendance: 1,000; Referees: Bujupi, Bujupi (KOS)

12 January 2025; 13:00	Malta	18–43	Cyprus	Palace of Culture and Sports, Varna; Attendance: 200; Referees: Bujupi, Bujupi (KOS)
12 January 2025; 13:00	Harrison, Spiteri 4	(8–18)	Karkalatos 11	Palace of Culture and Sports, Varna; Attendance: 200; Referees: Bujupi, Bujupi (KOS)
12 January 2025; 13:00	5× (suspension)	Report	3× (suspension)	Palace of Culture and Sports, Varna; Attendance: 200; Referees: Bujupi, Bujupi (KOS)

12 January 2025; 15:30	Bulgaria	27–27	Great Britain	Palace of Culture and Sports, Varna; Attendance: 2,500; Referees: Pirvu, Potirniche (ROU)
12 January 2025; 15:30	Dimitrov 6	(11–13)	Pereira, Yonish 6	Palace of Culture and Sports, Varna; Attendance: 2,500; Referees: Pirvu, Potirniche (ROU)
12 January 2025; 15:30	1× (yellow card) 5× (suspension)	Report	8× (suspension)	Palace of Culture and Sports, Varna; Attendance: 2,500; Referees: Pirvu, Potirniche (ROU)

== Promotion round ==
Six teams participate in this round: the first and seconde of the Phase 1, the three of the lowest-ranked fourth-ranked teams in the 2026 European Men's Handball Championship qualification and the best European team of the 2025 IHF Emerging Nations Championship. It will be held between 6 and 12 January 2026. The draw took place on 26 June 2025.

=== Participating teams ===
Qualification method	Team(s)
First and seconde of Qualification Phase 1	Great Britain; Cyprus
Three of the lowest-ranked fourth-ranked teams in the Men's EHF EURO 2026 Qualifiers	Turkey; Estonia; Latvia
Best European team at the 2025 IHF Emerging Nations Championship	Bulgaria

=== Seeding ===
The seeding was announced on 24 June 2025.

Pot 1	Pot 2
Latvia; Estonia; Turkey	Great Britain; Cyprus; Bulgaria

=== Overview ===
Team 1	Agg.	Team 2	1st leg	2nd leg
Bulgaria	64–75	Turkey	35–37	29–38
Cyprus	40–66	Estonia	27–31	13–35
Great Britain	52–75	Latvia	27–35	25–40

All times are (UTC+1).

==== Matches ====
7 January 2026; 17:30	Bulgaria	35–37	Turkey	Arena Shumen, Shumen; Attendance: 1,700; Referees: Manea, Iliescu (ROU)
7 January 2026; 17:30	Vassilev 8	(14–16)	Yıldız 11	Arena Shumen, Shumen; Attendance: 1,700; Referees: Manea, Iliescu (ROU)
7 January 2026; 17:30	1× (yellow card) 5× (suspension)	Report	1× (yellow card) 6× (suspension)	Arena Shumen, Shumen; Attendance: 1,700; Referees: Manea, Iliescu (ROU)

11 January 2026; 14:00	Turkey	38–29	Bulgaria	Başpehlivan Recep Kara Sports Hall, Altınordu, Ordu; Attendance: 1,595; Referees: Jović, Arnautović (BIH)
11 January 2026; 14:00	Yıldız 8	(23–15)	Sv. Dimitrov 8	Başpehlivan Recep Kara Sports Hall, Altınordu, Ordu; Attendance: 1,595; Referees: Jović, Arnautović (BIH)
11 January 2026; 14:00	2× (suspension)	Report	3× (suspension)	Başpehlivan Recep Kara Sports Hall, Altınordu, Ordu; Attendance: 1,595; Referees: Jović, Arnautović (BIH)

Turkey won 75–64 on aggregate.

7 January 2026; 19:00	Cyprus	27–31	Estonia	Eleftheria Indoor Hall, Nicosia; Attendance: 310; Referees: Mandák, Rudinský (SVK)
7 January 2026; 19:00	A. Charalambous 7	(12–16)	Rebane 9	Eleftheria Indoor Hall, Nicosia; Attendance: 310; Referees: Mandák, Rudinský (SVK)
7 January 2026; 19:00	2× (yellow card) 4× (suspension)	Report	1× (yellow card) 5× (suspension)	Eleftheria Indoor Hall, Nicosia; Attendance: 310; Referees: Mandák, Rudinský (SVK)

21 March 2026 (Note: The match, originally scheduled for 11 January 2026, was postponed after the Cypriot team was involved in a traffic accident and some delegation members received medical treatment.); 15:00	Estonia	35–13	Cyprus	Mesikäpa Hall, Põlva; Attendance: 500; Referees: Novykov (UKR), Gatelis ( LTU)
21 March 2026; 15:00	Jaanimaa 7	(16–5)	Misailidis, Tikkas 3	Mesikäpa Hall, Põlva; Attendance: 500; Referees: Novykov (UKR), Gatelis ( LTU)
21 March 2026; 15:00	1× (yellow card) 3× (suspension)	Report	1× (suspension)	Mesikäpa Hall, Põlva; Attendance: 500; Referees: Novykov (UKR), Gatelis ( LTU)

Estonia won 60–44 on aggregate.

7 January 2026; 18:00	Great Britain	27–35	Latvia	David Ross Sports Village, Nottingham; Attendance: 400; Referees: Thiyagarajah, Thiyagarajah (GER)
7 January 2026; 18:00	Pereira 11	(15–18)	three players 7	David Ross Sports Village, Nottingham; Attendance: 400; Referees: Thiyagarajah, Thiyagarajah (GER)
7 January 2026; 18:00	4× (suspension)	Report	3× (suspension)	David Ross Sports Village, Nottingham; Attendance: 400; Referees: Thiyagarajah, Thiyagarajah (GER)

11 January 2026; 14:10	Latvia	40–25	Great Britain	Zemgales Olimpiskais centrs, Jelgava; Attendance: 980; Referees: Cindrić, Gonzurek (CRO)
11 January 2026; 14:10	Kalniņš 10	(18–11)	Pereira 8	Zemgales Olimpiskais centrs, Jelgava; Attendance: 980; Referees: Cindrić, Gonzurek (CRO)
11 January 2026; 14:10	1× (yellow card) 7× (suspension)	Report	1× (yellow card) 5× (suspension)	Zemgales Olimpiskais centrs, Jelgava; Attendance: 980; Referees: Cindrić, Gonzurek (CRO)

Latvia won 75–52 on aggregate.

== Qualification Phase 2 ==
Like in previous cycles, 32 teams will be divided into eight groups of four, to be played as round-robin tournaments. The eight group winners and runners-up qualify for the final tournament, together with the four best third-placed teams, which will be determined taking into account only results against top two teams in each group. It will be played between November 2026 and May 2027.

=== Participating teams ===
Qualification method	Team(s)
Participated in the 2026 European Championship	Germany; Croatia; Iceland; Sweden; France; Slovenia; Norway; Hungary; Faroe Islands; North Macedonia; Netherlands; Austria; Czech Republic; Italy; Serbia; Georgia; Poland; Romania; Montenegro; Ukraine
Eliminated in Qualification Phase 2 for the 2026 European Championship	Greece; Belgium; Bosnia and Herzegovina; Lithuania; Slovakia; Finland; Israel; Luxembourg; Kosovo
Promotion round winners	Turkey; Latvia; Estonia

==== Draw ====
The draw took place on 26 March 2026.

==== Seeding ====
The seeding was announced on 23 March 2026.

Pot 1	Pot 2	Pot 3	Pot 4
France; Germany; Croatia; Sweden; Iceland; Hungary; Norway; Slovenia	Netherlands; Austria; North Macedonia; Serbia; Faroe Islands; Czech Republic; Poland; Italy	Montenegro; Georgia; Romania; Greece; Belgium; Bosnia and Herzegovina; Ukraine; Lithuania	Slovakia; Estonia; Finland; Israel; Turkey; Luxembourg; Kosovo; Latvia

=== Groups ===
All times are UTC+1, exept for the May window which are UTC+2.

==== Group 1 ====
Pos	Team	Pld	W	D	L	GF	GA	GD	Pts	Qualification
1	Croatia	2	2	0	0	81	53	+28	4	Final tournament
2	Netherlands	2	2	0	0	74	51	+23	4	Final tournament
3	Finland	2	0	0	2	49	68	−19	0	Possible final tournament based on ranking
4	Lithuania	2	0	0	2	55	87	−32	0	

Updated to match(es) played on 8 November 2026. Source: EHF
Rules for classification: 1) points; 2) head-to-head points; 3) head-to-head goal difference; 4) head-to-head number of goals scored; 5) goal difference.

4 November 2026; 17:00	Croatia	46–28	Lithuania	Arena Gripe, Split; Attendance: 4,000; Referees: Bragança, Xavier (POR)
4 November 2026; 17:00	Martinović 10	(23–11)	Budraitis 6	Arena Gripe, Split; Attendance: 4,000; Referees: Bragança, Xavier (POR)
4 November 2026; 17:00	4× (suspension)	Report	3× (suspension)	Arena Gripe, Split; Attendance: 4,000; Referees: Bragança, Xavier (POR)

5 November 2026; 19:30	Netherlands	33–24	Finland	Maaspoort, 's-Hertogenbosch; Attendance: 1,846; Referees: Me. Ilievski, Mi. Ilievski (MKD)
5 November 2026; 19:30	Ten Velde 10	(16–12)	Henriksson 11	Maaspoort, 's-Hertogenbosch; Attendance: 1,846; Referees: Me. Ilievski, Mi. Ilievski (MKD)
5 November 2026; 19:30	3× (suspension)	Report	2× (suspension)	Maaspoort, 's-Hertogenbosch; Attendance: 1,846; Referees: Me. Ilievski, Mi. Ilievski (MKD)

7 November 2026; 16:00	Finland	25–35	Croatia	Energia Areena, Vantaa; Attendance: 1,550; Referees: Yovchev, Yonchev (BUL)
7 November 2026; 16:00	Säkkinen 5	(12–19)	Šoštarić 7	Energia Areena, Vantaa; Attendance: 1,550; Referees: Yovchev, Yonchev (BUL)
7 November 2026; 16:00	4× (suspension)	Report	1× (yellow card)	Energia Areena, Vantaa; Attendance: 1,550; Referees: Yovchev, Yonchev (BUL)

8 November 2026; 13:20	Lithuania	27–41	Netherlands	Tauragė Arena, Tauragė; Attendance: 900; Referees: Bíró, Kiss (HUN)
8 November 2026; 13:20	Dumčius 12	(13–19)	Baijens, Versteijnen 7	Tauragė Arena, Tauragė; Attendance: 900; Referees: Bíró, Kiss (HUN)
8 November 2026; 13:20	6× (suspension) 1× (red card)	Report	3× (suspension)	Tauragė Arena, Tauragė; Attendance: 900; Referees: Bíró, Kiss (HUN)

10–11 March 2027	Netherlands	v	Croatia
10–11 March 2027		Report

10–11 March 2027	Lithuania	v	Finland
10–11 March 2027		Report

13–14 March 2027	Finland	v	Lithuania
13–14 March 2027		Report

13–14 March 2027	Croatia	v	Netherlands
13–14 March 2027		Report

5–6 May 2027	Lithuania	v	Croatia
5–6 May 2027		Report

5–6 May 2027	Finland	v	Netherlands
5–6 May 2027		Report

9 May 2027; 18:00	Croatia	v	Finland
9 May 2027; 18:00		Report

9 May 2027; 18:00	Netherlands	v	Lithuania
9 May 2027; 18:00		Report

==== Group 2 ====
Türkiye vs Norway in 8 November 2026 at THF Serdar Seymen Handball Hall

Pos	Team	Pld	W	D	L	GF	GA	GD	Pts	Qualification
1	Norway	2	2	0	0	85	54	+31	4	Final tournament
2	Austria	2	2	0	0	72	53	+19	4	Final tournament
3	Turkey	2	0	0	2	61	82	−21	0	Possible final tournament based on ranking
4	Georgia	2	0	0	2	46	75	−29	0	

Updated to match(es) played on 8 November 2026. Source: EHF
Rules for classification: 1) points; 2) head-to-head points; 3) head-to-head goal difference; 4) head-to-head number of goals scored; 5) goal difference.

4 November 2026; 18:00	Austria	37–30	Turkey	Raiffeisen Sportpark, Graz; Attendance: 2,452; Referees: Jerlecki, Łabunia (POL)
4 November 2026; 18:00	Frimmel 11	(19–15)	Cvetko, Nalbantoğlu 5	Raiffeisen Sportpark, Graz; Attendance: 2,452; Referees: Jerlecki, Łabunia (POL)
4 November 2026; 18:00	1× (yellow card) 1× (suspension)	Report	1× (yellow card) 3× (suspension)	Raiffeisen Sportpark, Graz; Attendance: 2,452; Referees: Jerlecki, Łabunia (POL)

5 November 2026; 18:00	Norway	40–23	Georgia	Åsane Arena, Bergen; Attendance: 2,116; Referees: Gasmi, Gasmi (FRA)
5 November 2026; 18:00	Lien 8	(20–12)	Arsenashvili 4	Åsane Arena, Bergen; Attendance: 2,116; Referees: Gasmi, Gasmi (FRA)
5 November 2026; 18:00	2× (suspension)	Report	3× (suspension)	Åsane Arena, Bergen; Attendance: 2,116; Referees: Gasmi, Gasmi (FRA)

8 November 2026; 14:00	Turkey	31–45	Norway	THF Serdar Seymen Handball Hall, Istanbul; Attendance: 1,430; Referees: Budzák, Záhradník (SVK)
8 November 2026; 14:00	Cvetko 11	(15–22)	Grøndahl, Pedersen 9	THF Serdar Seymen Handball Hall, Istanbul; Attendance: 1,430; Referees: Budzák, Záhradník (SVK)
8 November 2026; 14:00	3× (suspension)	Report	2× (suspension)	THF Serdar Seymen Handball Hall, Istanbul; Attendance: 1,430; Referees: Budzák, Záhradník (SVK)

8 November 2026; 15:00	Georgia	23–35	Austria	Tbilisi Sports Palace, Tbilisi; Attendance: 3,500; Referees: Hansen, Madsen (DEN)
8 November 2026; 15:00	Tskhovrebadze 12	(9–17)	Frimmel, Nigg 5	Tbilisi Sports Palace, Tbilisi; Attendance: 3,500; Referees: Hansen, Madsen (DEN)
8 November 2026; 15:00	1× (yellow card) 1× (suspension)	Report	3× (suspension)	Tbilisi Sports Palace, Tbilisi; Attendance: 3,500; Referees: Hansen, Madsen (DEN)

10–11 March 2027	Austria	v	Norway
10–11 March 2027		Report

10–11 March 2027	Turkey	v	Georgia
10–11 March 2027		Report

13–14 March 2027	Norway	v	Austria
13–14 March 2027		Report

13–14 March 2027	Georgia	v	Turkey
13–14 March 2027		Report

5–6 May 2027	Georgia	v	Norway
5–6 May 2027		Report

5–6 May 2027	Turkey	v	Austria
5–6 May 2027		Report

9 May 2027; 18:00	Norway	v	Turkey
9 May 2027; 18:00		Report

9 May 2027; 18:00	Austria	v	Georgia
9 May 2027; 18:00		Report

==== Group 3 ====
Pos	Team	Pld	W	D	L	GF	GA	GD	Pts	Qualification
1	Iceland	2	2	0	0	87	52	+35	4	Final tournament
2	Serbia	2	2	0	0	80	48	+32	4	Final tournament
3	Ukraine	2	0	0	2	56	89	−33	0	Possible final tournament based on ranking
4	Estonia	2	0	0	2	44	78	−34	0	

Updated to match(es) played on 8 November 2026. Source: EHF
Rules for classification: 1) points; 2) head-to-head points; 3) head-to-head goal difference; 4) head-to-head number of goals scored; 5) goal difference.

4 November 2026; 20:30	Iceland	48–26	Ukraine	Laugardalshöll, Reykjavík; Attendance: 2,000; Referees: Klompers, Stobbe (NED)
4 November 2026; 20:30	three players 6	(23–9)	Artemenko 8	Laugardalshöll, Reykjavík; Attendance: 2,000; Referees: Klompers, Stobbe (NED)
4 November 2026; 20:30	1× (suspension)	Report	2× (suspension)	Laugardalshöll, Reykjavík; Attendance: 2,000; Referees: Klompers, Stobbe (NED)

5 November 2026; 16:30	Serbia	39–18	Estonia	Sportska Hala Slana Bara, Novi Sad; Attendance: 1,950; Referees: Fabryczny, Rawicki (POL)
5 November 2026; 16:30	Vorkapić 7	(21–9)	Jaanimaa 5	Sportska Hala Slana Bara, Novi Sad; Attendance: 1,950; Referees: Fabryczny, Rawicki (POL)
5 November 2026; 16:30	1× (yellow card) 5× (suspension)	Report	1× (yellow card) 1× (suspension)	Sportska Hala Slana Bara, Novi Sad; Attendance: 1,950; Referees: Fabryczny, Rawicki (POL)

8 November 2026; 15:00	Ukraine	30–41	Serbia	Tatran Handball Arena, Prešov, Slovakia (Note: Due to the Russian invasion of Ukraine, the Ukrainian team plays their home matches at neutral venues.); Attendance: 243; Referees: Horváth, Marton (HUN)
8 November 2026; 15:00	Turchenko 10	(16–19)	Kojadinović 9	Tatran Handball Arena, Prešov, Slovakia; Attendance: 243; Referees: Horváth, Marton (HUN)
8 November 2026; 15:00	2× (suspension)	Report	1× (yellow card) 2× (suspension)	Tatran Handball Arena, Prešov, Slovakia; Attendance: 243; Referees: Horváth, Marton (HUN)

8 November 2026; 17:00	Estonia	26–39	Iceland	Kalev Sports Hall, Tallinn; Attendance: 400; Referees: Kinnari, Skogberg (FIN)
8 November 2026; 17:00	three players 4	(10–23)	Elísson 10	Kalev Sports Hall, Tallinn; Attendance: 400; Referees: Kinnari, Skogberg (FIN)
8 November 2026; 17:00	1× (yellow card) 3× (suspension)	Report	1× (suspension)	Kalev Sports Hall, Tallinn; Attendance: 400; Referees: Kinnari, Skogberg (FIN)

10–11 March 2027	Serbia	v	Iceland
10–11 March 2027		Report

10–11 March 2027	Estonia	v	Ukraine
10–11 March 2027		Report

13–14 March 2027	Iceland	v	Serbia
13–14 March 2027		Report

13–14 March 2027	Ukraine	v	Estonia
13–14 March 2027		Report

5–6 May 2027	Ukraine	v	Iceland
5–6 May 2027		Report

5–6 May 2027	Estonia	v	Serbia
5–6 May 2027		Report

9 May 2027; 18:00	Iceland	v	Estonia
9 May 2027; 18:00		Report

9 May 2027; 18:00	Serbia	v	Ukraine
9 May 2027; 18:00		Report

==== Group 4 ====
Pos	Team	Pld	W	D	L	GF	GA	GD	Pts	Qualification
1	Hungary	2	2	0	0	66	41	+25	4	Final tournament
2	Faroe Islands	2	1	1	0	71	64	+7	3	Final tournament
3	Montenegro	2	0	1	1	55	66	−11	1	Possible final tournament based on ranking
4	Kosovo	2	0	0	2	50	71	−21	0	

Updated to match(es) played on 8 November 2026. Source: EHF
Rules for classification: 1) points; 2) head-to-head points; 3) head-to-head goal difference; 4) head-to-head number of goals scored; 5) goal difference.

4 November 2026; 20:00	Faroe Islands	37–30	Kosovo	Við Tjarnir, Tórshavn; Attendance: 2,853; Referees: D. Martins, R. Martins (POR)
4 November 2026; 20:00	Ó. Mittún 8	(20–13)	Ramosaj 7	Við Tjarnir, Tórshavn; Attendance: 2,853; Referees: D. Martins, R. Martins (POR)
4 November 2026; 20:00	1× (yellow card) 2× (suspension)	Report	1× (yellow card) 3× (suspension)	Við Tjarnir, Tórshavn; Attendance: 2,853; Referees: D. Martins, R. Martins (POR)

5 November 2026; 18:00	Hungary	32–21	Montenegro	Tatabányai Multifunkcionális Sportcsarnok, Tatabánya; Attendance: 3,500; Referees: Backović, Palačković (SLO)
5 November 2026; 18:00	Ilić, Szita 5	(16–9)	Dragašević 8	Tatabányai Multifunkcionális Sportcsarnok, Tatabánya; Attendance: 3,500; Referees: Backović, Palačković (SLO)
5 November 2026; 18:00	4× (suspension)	Report	2× (suspension) 1× (red card)	Tatabányai Multifunkcionális Sportcsarnok, Tatabánya; Attendance: 3,500; Referees: Backović, Palačković (SLO)

8 November 2026; 17:15	Kosovo	20–34	Hungary	Bill Clinton Sports Arena, Ferizaj; Attendance: 2,500; Referees: Hellbusch, Jansen (GER)
8 November 2026; 17:15	Tahirukaj, Zogaj 5	(12–17)	Krakovszki 10	Bill Clinton Sports Arena, Ferizaj; Attendance: 2,500; Referees: Hellbusch, Jansen (GER)
8 November 2026; 17:15	1× (yellow card) 4× (suspension) 1× (red card)	Report	1× (suspension)	Bill Clinton Sports Arena, Ferizaj; Attendance: 2,500; Referees: Hellbusch, Jansen (GER)

8 November 2026; 18:00	Montenegro	34–34	Faroe Islands	Morača Sports Center, Podgorica; Attendance: 1,900; Referees: Álvarez, Bustamante (ESP)
8 November 2026; 18:00	Dragašević 7	(18–17)	E. Ellefsen á Skipagøtu 8	Morača Sports Center, Podgorica; Attendance: 1,900; Referees: Álvarez, Bustamante (ESP)
8 November 2026; 18:00	1× (yellow card) 1× (suspension)	Report	1× (yellow card) 3× (suspension)	Morača Sports Center, Podgorica; Attendance: 1,900; Referees: Álvarez, Bustamante (ESP)

10–11 March 2027	Faroe Islands	v	Hungary
10–11 March 2027		Report

10–11 March 2027	Kosovo	v	Montenegro
10–11 March 2027		Report

13–14 March 2027	Hungary	v	Faroe Islands
13–14 March 2027		Report

13–14 March 2027	Montenegro	v	Kosovo
13–14 March 2027		Report

5–6 May 2027	Montenegro	v	Hungary
5–6 May 2027		Report

5–6 May 2027	Kosovo	v	Faroe Islands
5–6 May 2027		Report

9 May 2027; 18:00	Hungary	v	Kosovo
9 May 2027; 18:00		Report

9 May 2027; 18:00	Faroe Islands	v	Montenegro
9 May 2027; 18:00		Report

==== Group 5 ====
Pos	Team	Pld	W	D	L	GF	GA	GD	Pts	Qualification
1	Czech Republic	2	2	0	0	59	45	+14	4	Final tournament
2	Slovenia	2	1	0	1	66	59	+7	2	Final tournament
3	Israel	2	1	0	1	57	55	+2	2	Possible final tournament based on ranking
4	Bosnia and Herzegovina	2	0	0	2	47	70	−23	0	

Updated to match(es) played on 8 November 2026. Source: EHF
Rules for classification: 1) points; 2) head-to-head points; 3) head-to-head goal difference; 4) head-to-head number of goals scored; 5) goal difference.

4 November 2026; 18:00	Slovenia	38–28	Bosnia and Herzegovina	Arena Bonifika, Koper; Attendance: 2,600; Referees: Bogdanovs, Čerņavskis (LAT)
4 November 2026; 18:00	Vlah 6	(22–11)	Šahinović, Stojković 6	Arena Bonifika, Koper; Attendance: 2,600; Referees: Bogdanovs, Čerņavskis (LAT)
4 November 2026; 18:00	2× (suspension)	Report	4× (suspension)	Arena Bonifika, Koper; Attendance: 2,600; Referees: Bogdanovs, Čerņavskis (LAT)

4 November 2026; 18:00	Czech Republic	27–26	Israel	Datart Hala, Zlín; Attendance: 1,562; Referees: Antić, Jakovljević (SRB)
4 November 2026; 18:00	Piroch 9	(15–10)	Lumbroso 10	Datart Hala, Zlín; Attendance: 1,562; Referees: Antić, Jakovljević (SRB)
4 November 2026; 18:00	6× (suspension)	Report	1× (yellow card) 5× (suspension)	Datart Hala, Zlín; Attendance: 1,562; Referees: Antić, Jakovljević (SRB)

7 November 2026; 17:30	Slovenia	28–31	Israel	Golovec Hall, Celje; Attendance: 2,256; Referees: Pîrvu, Potîrniche (ROU)
7 November 2026; 17:30	B. Janc 6	(14–13)	Mosindi 10	Golovec Hall, Celje; Attendance: 2,256; Referees: Pîrvu, Potîrniche (ROU)
7 November 2026; 17:30	1× (yellow card) 2× (suspension)	Report	7× (suspension)	Golovec Hall, Celje; Attendance: 2,256; Referees: Pîrvu, Potîrniche (ROU)

8 November 2026; 17:00	Bosnia and Herzegovina	19–32	Czech Republic	SKPC Mejdan, Tuzla; Attendance: 1,500; Referees: A. Covalciuc, I. Covalciuc (MDA)
8 November 2026; 17:00	Cajić 5	(7–13)	Klíma, Piroch 4	SKPC Mejdan, Tuzla; Attendance: 1,500; Referees: A. Covalciuc, I. Covalciuc (MDA)
8 November 2026; 17:00	5× (suspension)	Report	2× (suspension)	SKPC Mejdan, Tuzla; Attendance: 1,500; Referees: A. Covalciuc, I. Covalciuc (MDA)

10–11 March 2027	Czech Republic	v	Slovenia
10–11 March 2027		Report

10–11 March 2027	Israel	v	Bosnia and Herzegovina
10–11 March 2027		Report

13–14 March 2027	Slovenia	v	Czech Republic
13–14 March 2027		Report

13–14 March 2027	Bosnia and Herzegovina	v	Israel
13–14 March 2027		Report

5–6 May 2027	Bosnia and Herzegovina	v	Slovenia
5–6 May 2027		Report

5–6 May 2027	Israel	v	Czech Republic
5–6 May 2027		Report

9 May 2027; 18:00	Israel	v	Slovenia
9 May 2027; 18:00		Report

9 May 2027; 18:00	Czech Republic	v	Bosnia and Herzegovina
9 May 2027; 18:00		Report

==== Group 6 ====
Pos	Team	Pld	W	D	L	GF	GA	GD	Pts	Qualification
1	France	2	2	0	0	78	56	+22	4	Final tournament
2	Poland	2	2	0	0	63	52	+11	4	Final tournament
3	Romania	2	0	0	2	55	64	−9	0	Possible final tournament based on ranking
4	Latvia	2	0	0	2	53	77	−24	0	

Updated to match(es) played on 8 November 2026. Source: EHF
Rules for classification: 1) points; 2) head-to-head points; 3) head-to-head goal difference; 4) head-to-head number of goals scored; 5) goal difference.

4 November 2026; 18:00	Poland	33–24	Latvia	Stegu Arena, Opole; Attendance: 2,975; Referees: Mandák, Rudinský (SVK)
4 November 2026; 18:00	Michałowicz 8	(21–11)	J. Valkovskis, L. Valkovskis 7	Stegu Arena, Opole; Attendance: 2,975; Referees: Mandák, Rudinský (SVK)
4 November 2026; 18:00	1× (yellow card) 4× (suspension)	Report	1× (yellow card) 6× (suspension)	Stegu Arena, Opole; Attendance: 2,975; Referees: Mandák, Rudinský (SVK)

5 November 2026; 20:00	France	34–27	Romania	Arena du Pays d'Aix, Aix-en-Provence; Attendance: 4,893; Referees: Mitrović, Vešović (MNE)
5 November 2026; 20:00	Mem 7	(15–13)	Buzle 10	Arena du Pays d'Aix, Aix-en-Provence; Attendance: 4,893; Referees: Mitrović, Vešović (MNE)
5 November 2026; 20:00	1× (yellow card) 5× (suspension)	Report	3× (suspension)	Arena du Pays d'Aix, Aix-en-Provence; Attendance: 4,893; Referees: Mitrović, Vešović (MNE)

8 November 2026; 14:10	Latvia	29–44	France	Zemgale Olympic Center, Jelgava; Attendance: 1,120; Referees: Novykov (UKR), Gatelis ( LTU)
8 November 2026; 14:10	J. Valkovskis 10	(15–25)	Descat, Richardson 6	Zemgale Olympic Center, Jelgava; Attendance: 1,120; Referees: Novykov (UKR), Gatelis ( LTU)
8 November 2026; 14:10	1× (yellow card) 1× (suspension)	Report	1× (yellow card) 3× (suspension)	Zemgale Olympic Center, Jelgava; Attendance: 1,120; Referees: Novykov (UKR), Gatelis ( LTU)

8 November 2026; 19:00	Romania	28–30	Poland	Danubis Arena, Tulcea; Attendance: 3,823; Referees: Jørum, Kleven (NOR)
8 November 2026; 19:00	Buzle 11	(16–19)	Olejniczak 7	Danubis Arena, Tulcea; Attendance: 3,823; Referees: Jørum, Kleven (NOR)
8 November 2026; 19:00	3× (suspension)	Report	1× (yellow card) 3× (suspension)	Danubis Arena, Tulcea; Attendance: 3,823; Referees: Jørum, Kleven (NOR)

10–11 March 2027	Poland	v	France
10–11 March 2027		Report

10–11 March 2027	Latvia	v	Romania
10–11 March 2027		Report

13–14 March 2027	France	v	Poland
13–14 March 2027		Report

13–14 March 2027	Romania	v	Latvia
13–14 March 2027		Report

5–6 May 2027	Romania	v	France
5–6 May 2027		Report

5–6 May 2027	Latvia	v	Poland
5–6 May 2027		Report

9 May 2027; 18:00	France	v	Latvia
9 May 2027; 18:00		Report

9 May 2027; 18:00	Poland	v	Romania
9 May 2027; 18:00		Report

==== Group 7 ====
Pos	Team	Pld	W	D	L	GF	GA	GD	Pts	Qualification
1	Germany	2	2	0	0	81	59	+22	4	Final tournament
2	Italy	2	2	0	0	58	52	+6	4	Final tournament
3	Slovakia	2	0	0	2	59	73	−14	0	Possible final tournament based on ranking
4	Belgium	2	0	0	2	52	66	−14	0	

Updated to match(es) played on 8 November 2026. Source: EHF
Rules for classification: 1) points; 2) head-to-head points; 3) head-to-head goal difference; 4) head-to-head number of goals scored; 5) goal difference.

5 November 2026; 19:30	Italy	34–32	Slovakia	Pala San Giacomo, Conversano; Attendance: 3,200; Referees: Mitrevski, Todorovski (MKD)
5 November 2026; 19:30	Prantner 8	(17–17)	Smetanka 6	Pala San Giacomo, Conversano; Attendance: 3,200; Referees: Mitrevski, Todorovski (MKD)
5 November 2026; 19:30	1× (yellow card) 5× (suspension) 1× (red card)	Report	1× (yellow card) 4× (suspension) 1× (red card)	Pala San Giacomo, Conversano; Attendance: 3,200; Referees: Mitrevski, Todorovski (MKD)

5 November 2026; 20:30	Germany	42–32	Belgium	Uber Arena, Berlin; Attendance: 12,684; Referees: Heddid, Picot (FRA)
5 November 2026; 20:30	Grgić 7	(22–18)	Danesi 11	Uber Arena, Berlin; Attendance: 12,684; Referees: Heddid, Picot (FRA)
5 November 2026; 20:30	2× (suspension)	Report	4× (suspension)	Uber Arena, Berlin; Attendance: 12,684; Referees: Heddid, Picot (FRA)

7 November 2026; 20:10	Belgium	20–24	Italy	Sporthal Alverberg, Hasselt; Attendance: 1,155; Referees: Kurtagic, Wetterwik (SWE)
7 November 2026; 20:10	Kotters 5	(11–13)	Prantner 6	Sporthal Alverberg, Hasselt; Attendance: 1,155; Referees: Kurtagic, Wetterwik (SWE)
7 November 2026; 20:10	1× (yellow card) 1× (suspension)	Report	2× (yellow card) 2× (suspension)	Sporthal Alverberg, Hasselt; Attendance: 1,155; Referees: Kurtagic, Wetterwik (SWE)

8 November 2026; 18:00	Slovakia	27–39	Germany	Tatran Handball Arena, Prešov; Attendance: 2,220; Referees: Brkic, Schmidhuber (AUT)
8 November 2026; 18:00	Valent 8	(12–24)	Zerbe 7	Tatran Handball Arena, Prešov; Attendance: 2,220; Referees: Brkic, Schmidhuber (AUT)
8 November 2026; 18:00	2× (suspension)	Report	2× (suspension)	Tatran Handball Arena, Prešov; Attendance: 2,220; Referees: Brkic, Schmidhuber (AUT)

10–11 March 2027	Italy	v	Germany
10–11 March 2027		Report

10–11 March 2027	Slovakia	v	Belgium
10–11 March 2027		Report

13–14 March 2027	Germany	v	Italy
13–14 March 2027		Report

13–14 March 2027	Belgium	v	Slovakia
13–14 March 2027		Report

5–6 May 2027	Belgium	v	Germany
5–6 May 2027		Report

5–6 May 2027	Slovakia	v	Italy
5–6 May 2027		Report

9 May 2027; 18:00	Germany	v	Slovakia
9 May 2027; 18:00		Report

9 May 2027; 18:00	Italy	v	Belgium
9 May 2027; 18:00		Report

==== Group 8 ====
Pos	Team	Pld	W	D	L	GF	GA	GD	Pts	Qualification
1	Sweden	2	2	0	0	83	44	+39	4	Final tournament
2	North Macedonia	2	1	0	1	65	52	+13	2	Final tournament
3	Greece	2	1	0	1	53	57	−4	2	Possible final tournament based on ranking
4	Luxembourg	2	0	0	2	43	91	−48	0	

Updated to match(es) played on 8 November 2026. Source: EHF
Rules for classification: 1) points; 2) head-to-head points; 3) head-to-head goal difference; 4) head-to-head number of goals scored; 5) goal difference.

4 November 2026; 19:00	North Macedonia	41–23	Luxembourg	Boris Trajkovski Sports Center, Skopje; Attendance: 3,000; Referees: Pukšič, Satler (SLO)
4 November 2026; 19:00	Kosteski 6	(20–10)	Kreiselmaier 8	Boris Trajkovski Sports Center, Skopje; Attendance: 3,000; Referees: Pukšič, Satler (SLO)
4 November 2026; 19:00	2× (suspension)	Report	3× (suspension)	Boris Trajkovski Sports Center, Skopje; Attendance: 3,000; Referees: Pukšič, Satler (SLO)

5 November 2026; 18:30	Sweden	33–24	Greece	Vida Arena, Växjö; Attendance: 4,142; Referees: Bošnjak, Marić (BIH)
5 November 2026; 18:30	Lagergren 7	(18–13)	Boskos 8	Vida Arena, Växjö; Attendance: 4,142; Referees: Bošnjak, Marić (BIH)
5 November 2026; 18:30	1× (yellow card)	Report	4× (suspension)	Vida Arena, Växjö; Attendance: 4,142; Referees: Bošnjak, Marić (BIH)

8 November 2026; 16:00	Luxembourg	20–50	Sweden	d'Coque, Luxembourg; Attendance: 1,800; Referees: Maia, Nunes (POR)
8 November 2026; 16:00	Etute 8	(10–26)	Hallbäck 8	d'Coque, Luxembourg; Attendance: 1,800; Referees: Maia, Nunes (POR)
8 November 2026; 16:00	1× (suspension)	Report	2× (suspension)	d'Coque, Luxembourg; Attendance: 1,800; Referees: Maia, Nunes (POR)

8 November 2026; 16:00	Greece	29–24	North Macedonia	Tasos Kampouris Kanithou Indoor Hall, Chalcis; Attendance: 1,200; Referees: Schulze, Tönnies (GER)
8 November 2026; 16:00	Stathis, Toskas 7	(16–9)	Kosteski 8	Tasos Kampouris Kanithou Indoor Hall, Chalcis; Attendance: 1,200; Referees: Schulze, Tönnies (GER)
8 November 2026; 16:00	1× (yellow card) 4× (suspension)	Report	1× (yellow card) 1× (suspension) 1× (red card)	Tasos Kampouris Kanithou Indoor Hall, Chalcis; Attendance: 1,200; Referees: Schulze, Tönnies (GER)

10–11 March 2027	North Macedonia	v	Sweden
10–11 March 2027		Report

10–11 March 2027	Luxembourg	v	Greece
10–11 March 2027		Report

13–14 March 2027	Sweden	v	North Macedonia
13–14 March 2027		Report

13–14 March 2027	Greece	v	Luxembourg
13–14 March 2027		Report

5–6 May 2027	Greece	v	Sweden
5–6 May 2027		Report

5–6 May 2027	Luxembourg	v	North Macedonia
5–6 May 2027		Report

9 May 2027; 18:00	Sweden	v	Luxembourg
9 May 2027; 18:00		Report

9 May 2027; 18:00	North Macedonia	v	Greece
9 May 2027; 18:00		Report

==== Ranking of third-placed teams ====
Results against the fourth-placed team are omitted.

Pos	Grp	Team	Pld	W	D	L	GF	GA	GD	Pts	Qualification
1	5	Israel	2	1	0	1	57	55	+2	2	Final tournament
2	8	Greece	2	1	0	1	53	57	−4	2	Final tournament
3	4	Montenegro	2	0	1	1	55	66	−11	1	Final tournament
4	6	Romania	2	0	0	2	55	64	−9	0	Final tournament
5	7	Slovakia	2	0	0	2	59	73	−14	0	
6	1	Finland	2	0	0	2	49	68	−19	0	
7	2	Turkey	2	0	0	2	61	82	−21	0	
8	3	Ukraine	2	0	0	2	56	89	−33	0	

Updated to match(es) played on 8 November 2026. Source: EHF
Rules for classification: 1) points; 2) goal difference; 3) number of goals scored; 4) draw.

== EHF Euro Cup ==
2028 EHF Euro Cup
Tournament details
- Dates: November 2026 – May 2027
- Teams: 4 (from 1 confederation)

The EHF Euro Cup will take place for the fifth time and is scheduled to be contested by the 2028 co-hosts Portugal, Spain and Switzerland, plus the defending champions, Denmark. Like every other edition, four teams will participate.

=== Composition of teams ===
Team	Qualification method	Date of qualification	Appearance(s)				Previous best performance
Team	Qualification method	Date of qualification	Total	First	Last	Streak	Previous best performance
Portugal	Co-hosts	20 November 2021	1st	Debut			
Spain	Co-hosts	20 November 2021	4th	2020	2024	1	Champions (2020)
Switzerland	Co-hosts	20 November 2021	1st	Debut			
Denmark	2026 champions	1 February 2026	3rd	2024	2026	3	Champions (2024)

=== Standings ===
Pos	Team	Pld	W	D	L	GF	GA	GD	Pts
1	Denmark	2	1	1	0	61	52	+9	3
2	Portugal	2	1	1	0	70	65	+5	3
3	Spain	2	0	2	0	65	65	0	2
4	Switzerland	2	0	0	2	52	66	−14	0

Updated to match(es) played on 8 November 2026. Source: EHF
Rules for classification: 1) points; 2) head-to-head points; 3) head-to-head goal difference; 4) head-to-head number of goals scored; 5) goal difference.

=== Results ===
4 November 2026; 20:00	Portugal	33–28	Switzerland	Super Bock Arena, Porto; Attendance: 2,613; Referees: Altmár, Horváth (HUN)
4 November 2026; 20:00	Tavares 7	(16–11)	Willecke 8	Super Bock Arena, Porto; Attendance: 2,613; Referees: Altmár, Horváth (HUN)
4 November 2026; 20:00	3× (suspension)	Report	4× (suspension)	Super Bock Arena, Porto; Attendance: 2,613; Referees: Altmár, Horváth (HUN)

4 November 2026; 20:15	Denmark	28–28	Spain	Jyske Bank Boxen, Herning; Attendance: 10,029; Referees: Metalari, Nikolovski (MKD)
4 November 2026; 20:15	Gidsel 9	(16–13)	Cikuša 6	Jyske Bank Boxen, Herning; Attendance: 10,029; Referees: Metalari, Nikolovski (MKD)
4 November 2026; 20:15	2× (suspension)	Report	3× (suspension)	Jyske Bank Boxen, Herning; Attendance: 10,029; Referees: Metalari, Nikolovski (MKD)

8 November 2026; 16:00	Switzerland	24–33	Denmark	Swiss Life Arena, Zurich; Attendance: 11,600; Referees: Kuttler, Merz (GER)
8 November 2026; 16:00	Sigrist 7	(9–13)	Pytlick 10	Swiss Life Arena, Zurich; Attendance: 11,600; Referees: Kuttler, Merz (GER)
8 November 2026; 16:00	3× (suspension)	Report	2× (yellow card) 5× (suspension)	Swiss Life Arena, Zurich; Attendance: 11,600; Referees: Kuttler, Merz (GER)

8 November 2026; 18:00	Spain	37–37	Portugal	Pabellon 3 IFEVI, Vigo; Attendance: 4,000; Referees: Jovandić, Sekulić (SRB)
8 November 2026; 18:00	Aregay 7	(18–17)	three players 6	Pabellon 3 IFEVI, Vigo; Attendance: 4,000; Referees: Jovandić, Sekulić (SRB)
8 November 2026; 18:00	6× (suspension)	Report	1× (suspension)	Pabellon 3 IFEVI, Vigo; Attendance: 4,000; Referees: Jovandić, Sekulić (SRB)

10–11 March 2027	Portugal	v	Denmark
10–11 March 2027		Report

10–11 March 2027	Switzerland	v	Spain
10–11 March 2027		Report

13–14 March 2027	Denmark	v	Portugal
13–14 March 2027		Report

13–14 March 2027	Spain	v	Switzerland
13–14 March 2027		Report

5–6 May 2027	Spain	v	Denmark
5–6 May 2027		Report

5–6 May 2027	Switzerland	v	Portugal
5–6 May 2027		Report

9 May 2027	Denmark	v	Switzerland
9 May 2027		Report

9 May 2027	Portugal	v	Spain
9 May 2027		Report

== Qualified teams ==
Team	Qualification method	Date of qualification	Appearance(s)				Previous best performance (Note: Bold text indicates they hosted that edition.)	Rank
Team	Qualification method	Date of qualification	Total	First	Last	Streak	Previous best performance	Rank
Portugal	Host nation	20 November 2021	10th	1994	2026	5	Fifth place (2026)	TBD
Spain	Host nation	20 November 2021	18th	1994	2026	18	Champions (2018, 2020)	TBD
Switzerland	Host nation	20 November 2021	7th	2002	2026	3	Twelfth place (2004)	TBD
Denmark	Defending champions	1 February 2026	17th	1994	2026	15	Champions (2008, 2012, 2026)	TBD
