= Basri Tupella =

Kosovan handball player

- Born: 1959; Mitrovica, FPR Yugoslavia
- Disappeared: June 1999; Mitrovica, FR Yugoslavia
- Status: Missing for 27 years, 4 months and 19 days
- Handball career
- Sport: Handball
- Position: Center

Youth career
- Years: Team
- –1974: Trepça

Senior clubs
- Years: Team
- 1974–1978: Trepça
- 1979–1980: Borci
- 1981–1984: Trepça
- –: Proleter Zrenjanin
- –: Novi Pazar
- 1987–1989: Borci
- 1989: CDC Tenerife
- 1991–1997: Trepça

Basri Tupella (1959 – disappeared June 1999) was a Kosovan handball player. He played for several clubs in Yugoslavia and also for CDC Tenerife in Spain. Tupella is regarded as one of the greatest Albanian handball players of all time.

== Disappearance ==
During the Kosovo War in June 1999, Serbian military forces arrested Tupella together with his brother and nephew. Basri Tupella was possibly murdered by the Serbian forces and is declared missing since June 1999.

== Honours ==
KH Trepça

- Yugoslav Regional Championship: 1974–75
- Kosovar Superliga: 1993–94
- Kosovar Cup: 1994
