= KH Trepça =

Kosovar handball club

- Full name: Klubi Hendbollistik Trepça
- Nickname(s): Xehëtarët, Minatorët (The Miners)
- Founded: 1950; 75 years ago
- Arena: Minatori Sports Hall, Mitrovica
- Capacity: 3,000
- President: Bujar Istrefi
- Head coach: Taib Kabashi
- League: Kosovar Handball Superliga
- Club colours
Home	Away

KH Trepça is a handball team based Mitrovica. KH Trepça competes in the Kosovar Superliga and Cup.

Location of KH Trepça

== History ==
KH Trepça was founded in 1950 in Mitrovica. They competed in the Yugoslav regional championship of Kosovo and in the second Yugoslav League. During the Yugoslav era they won the Regional Championship three times. KH Trepça reached the Yugoslav First League in the 1979–80 season and were the first Kosovan club to achieve this huge success. In 1991, KH Trepça like many other Kosovan clubs left the Yugoslav handball league system because Kosovo proclaimed independence from Serbia and they started competing in the Superliga. Trepça won the Kosovar Superliga in 1994 and 2001. In addition to that, Trepça won the Kosovar Cup in 1994, 2002 and 2023.

== Crest, colours, supporters ==
=== Kits ===
HOME
2022–23	2023–24

AWAY
2022–23	2023–24

== Sports Hall information ==
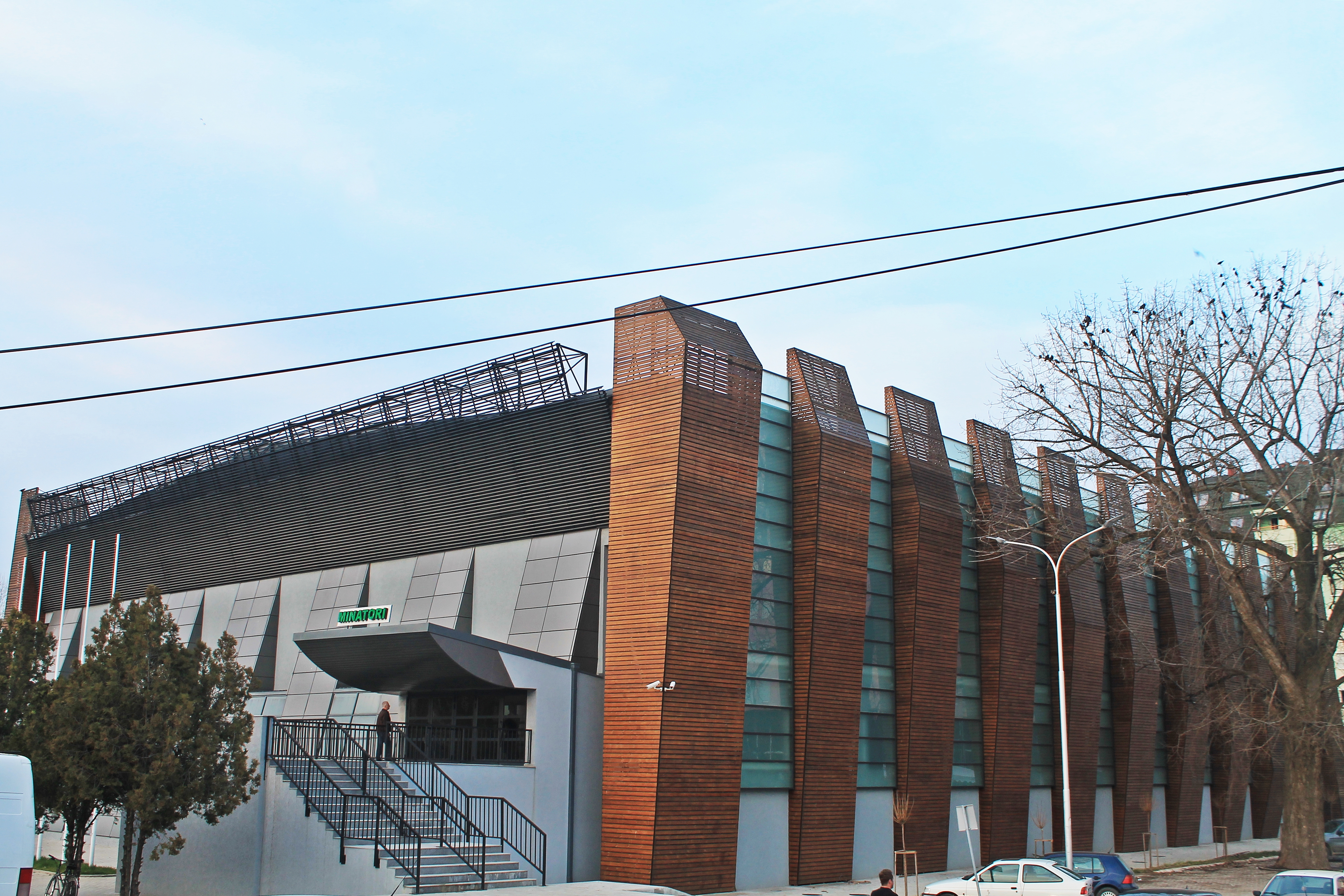
Home hall: Minatori Sports Hall

- Arena: - Minatori Sports Hall
- City: - Mitrovica
- Capacity: - 3000
- Address: - Mitrovica, Kosovo

== Team ==
=== Current squad ===
Squad for the 2023–24 season

KH Trepça

Goalkeepers

- 1 (Kosovo) Behar Terziqi
- 12 (Kosovo) Sadri Dragaj
- 16 (Kosovo) Liridon Esati

Left Wingers

- 9 (Kosovo) Lulzim Shabani
- 18 (Kosovo) Alban Mahmuti
- 19 (Kosovo) Edmond Istrefi

Right Wingers

- 2 (Kosovo) Getoar Hajzeri
- 10 (Kosovo) Shpetim Mehmeti
- 11 (Tunisia) Yassine Henahem

Line Players

- 3 (Kosovo) Rron Ramadani
- 5 (Kosovo) Amar Mujka
- 6 (Kosovo) Ermir Januzi
- 7 (Kosovo) Sali Maxhera (c)

Central Backs

- 8 (Kosovo) Hamdi Salihu
- 14 (Kosovo) Vlerson Zherka

Left Backs

- 4 (Kosovo) Deniz Terziqi
- 15 (Kosovo) Ermir Smaka

Right Backs

- 17 (Brazil) Marley Wallace De Carvalho

=== Technical staff ===
- Head coach: (Kosovo) Taib Kabashi
- Assistant coach: (Kosovo) Besim Shala
- Physiotherapist: (Kosovo) Gentian Kabashi
- Club doctor: (Kosovo) Gazmend Sahiti

=== Transfers ===
Transfers for the 2023–24 season

Joining

- (North Macedonia) Vladimir Trajkovski (CB)
- (Brazil) Marley Wallace De Carvalho (RB) from (Kosovo) KH Rahoveci
- (Kosovo) Liridon Esati (GK) from (Kosovo) KH Kastrioti
- (Kosovo) Lulzim Shabani (LW) from (Kosovo) KH Kastrioti
- (Kosovo) Rron Ramadani (LP) from (Kosovo) KH Prishtina

Leaving

- (Algeria) Mohamed Hachemi (GK)
- (Tunisia) Yassine Ben Jouida (LB)
- (Kosovo) Kushtrim Kastrati (LB) (retires)
- (Kosovo) Meriton Lladrovci (GK)
- (Kosovo) Muhamet Dubovci (CB)
- (North Macedonia) Vladimir Trajkovski (CB) to (Greece) Panellinios G.S.

== Titles ==
- Yugoslav Regional Championship:
  - Winners (3): 1968, 1975, 1990
- Superliga :
  - Winners (2): 1994, 2001
- Kosovo Cup:
  - Winners (3): 1994, 2002, 2023

== European record ==
Season	Competition	Round	Club	1st leg	2nd leg	Aggregate
2017–18	EHF Challenge Cup	R3	(Romania) AHC Potaissa Turda	19-35	30-40	49-75
2021–22	EHF Challenge Cup	R1	(Israel) HC Holon	22-29	25-37	47-66
2022–23	EHF Challenge Cup	R2	(Bosnia and Herzegovina) RK Vogošća	27-27	30-31	57-58

== EHF ranking ==
As of 29/3/2024

Rank	Team	Points
183	(Croatia) RK Dubrava	16
184	(Bosnia and Herzegovina) RK Sloga Doboj	16
185	(Germany) HSG Wetzlar	16
186	(Kosovo) KH Trepça	16
187	(Austria) SG Handball West Wien	16
188	(Denmark) Mors-Thy Håndbold	16
189	(Sweden) IFK Skövde	15

== Notable players ==
- (Kosovo) Dervish Berisha
- (Kosovo) Aziz Makiqi
- (Kosovo) Basri Tupella
- (Kosovo) Alfred Llazari
- (Kosovo) Leonard Llazari
- (Kosovo) Sami Mustafa
- (Kosovo) Sali Maxhera
- (Kosovo) Deniz Terziqi
- (Kosovo) Lulzim Shabani
- (Kosovo) Atdhe Basholli
- (Kosovo) Meriton Lladrovci
- (Tunisia) Yassine Henahem
- (Tunisia) Yassine Ben Jouida
- (Tunisia) Marouane Soussi

== See also ==
- KB Trepça (basketball)
- KF Trepça (football)
