= Kosovo men's national handball team =

Kosovo

Information
- Nickname: Dardanët (Dardanians); Luanët e Artë (Golden Lions)
- Association: Handball Federation of Kosovo
- Coach: Jesper Östlund
- Captain: Valon Dedaj
- Most caps: Kastriot Jupa (56)
- Most goals: Kastriot Jupa (189)

Colours
1st	2nd

Results

IHF Emerging Nations Championship, Handball at the Mediterranean Games
- Appearances: 3 (First in 2015, 2016)
- Best result: 3rd (2015, 2017)
- Last updated on 18 June 2017.

The Kosovo national men's handball team is the national handball team of Kosovo, representing the country in international competition. The team is governed by Handball Federation of Kosovo. The national handball team started competing in international competitions in 2014, following Kosovo's full status recognition from the International Handball Federation (IHF).

== History ==
Handball first arrived in Kosovo in the late 1940s, and by 1948 there were several registered clubs starting to compete in informal domestic competitions. By 1951, indoor handball was introduced. Two years later, in 1953, Handball Federation of Kosovo was founded, under the auspices of the Yugoslav Handball Federation. In 1979, whilst part of the former Yugoslavia, Kosovo hosted the 1979 Women's Junior World Handball Championship. Following the breakdown of Yugoslavia and subsequent independence of Kosovo as a nation, Handball Federation of Kosovo began operating independently.

In 2014, six years after Kosovo declared independence, the European Handball Federation (EHF) recognised Kosovo as a full member state and immediately the Kosovo national handball team started competing in international competition.

After a short time Kosovo would hold its first Handball Tournament the 2015 IHF Emerging Nations Championship was held in Prishtina. They impressively would win the bronze medal in their debut participation. Defeating Uruguay for third place with a result of 28–16, the first medal in their young Handball history. Kosovo would follow the same achievement in the following Tournament winning bronze again in Bulgaria 2017 beating Cyprus with 32–25 in the end. Securing them also a spot to the Second phase of qualification for the European Men's Handball Championship 2020.

Kosovo were drawn in Group 1 against Germany, Poland and Israel. The Dardanians were able to get some fair results after beating Israel at home 27-24 their first win in such a stage. They also secure an unlucky last second draw against Poland. Despite not qualifying to the main event Kosovo were able to actually compete with the 32 best European national teams in Handball. In the following Qualification for the 2022 European Men's Handball Championship. Kosovo once more qualified for the Playoffs. In Group 8 they faced Sweden, Montenegro and Romania. After a draw at home Against Romania with 23-23 they were able to secure their first-ever away win in this face after beating surprisingly Romania in the following match with 25–30 in full time. Kosovo could not gain another win as they lost to Montenegro once more at home this time with 22–27. Missing out close once more on their first ever European Men's Handball Championship participation, after finishing third in the end. One of the greatest achievements in the Kosovan Handball history.

== IHF Emerging Nations Championship ==
Year	Position	Pld	W	D	L
Kosovo 2015	3rd place, bronze medalist(s)	6	4	0	2
Bulgaria 2017	3rd place, bronze medalist(s)	6	4	0	2
Total		12	8	0	4

== Team ==
=== Current squad ===
- The squad selected for the 2024 European Men's Handball Championship qualification matches.
- Updated: 22 December 2022
- Head coach: Bujar Qerimi

No.	Pos.	Name	Date of birth (age)	Height	App.	Goals	Club
2	RW	Agon Bajqinovci	26 August 1999 (age 26)	1.86 m	5	2	(Kosovo) KH Prishtina
5	PV	Kastriot Jupa	17 December 1992 (age 33)	1.88 m	56	189	(Germany) LHC Cottbus
11	CB	Valon Dedaj	25 September 1989 (age 36)	1.75 m	42	164	(Switzerland) HSC Kreuzlingen
12	GK	Flamur Gërbeshi	14 April 1990 (age 36)	1.88 m	18	0	(Sweden) IFK Karlskrona
14	RB	Drenit Tahirukaj	28 April 1998 (age 28)	1.92 m	28	82	(Switzerland) HSC Kreuzlingen
18	LW	Florian Rexha	29 November 2001 (age 24)	1.88 m	2	0	(Kosovo) KH Vëllaznimi
21	RB	Arbios Mushkolaj	24 July 2000 (age 26)	1.90 m	7	3	(Kosovo) KH Deçani
24	PV	Luigj Quni	26 February 1996 (age 30)	1.91 m	36	49	(Switzerland) GC Amicitia Zürich
25	LB	Festim Mustafa	22 May 1998 (age 28)	2.02 m	10	2	(Kosovo) KH Kastrioti
26	RW	Drilon Tahirukaj	28 August 1995 (age 30)	1.80 m	41	88	(Switzerland) HSC Kreuzlingen
27	LW	Lulëzim Shabani	9 November 1998 (age 27)	1.89 m	18	18	(Kosovo) KH Kastrioti
28	GK	Haris Berisha	26 June 1996 (age 30)	1.99 m	33	1	(Switzerland) HSC Kreuzlingen
31	LB	Bujar Ramosaj	9 February 1995 (age 31)	1.99 m	23	11	(Switzerland) HSC Kreuzlingen
33	LB	Jon Muqolli	11 February 1999 (age 27)	1.90 m	18	9	(Kosovo) KH Besa Famgas
33	CB	Leonard Gegaj	2 October 2001 (age 24)	1.80 m	13	9	(Sweden) Vinslövs HK
35	PV	Rron Ramadani	4 October 1996 (age 29)	1.92 m	10	0	(Kosovo) KH Prishtina
35	LB	Atdhe Basholli	7 July 1998 (age 28)	1.95 m	2	0	(Germany) AM Hallo Essen
68	CB	Egzon Gjuka	17 May 1995 (age 31)	1.92 m	35	105	(Kosovo) KH Besa Famgas
77	LW	Matej Taçi	5 December 2001 (age 24)	1.80 m	4	4	(Croatia) GRK Varaždin
91	GK	Liridon Zena	11 April 1991 (age 35)	1.90 m	15	0	(Croatia) RK Rudan Adria Oil
94	CB	Shaban Zogaj	7 March 2002 (age 24)	1.90 m	6	9	(Denmark) Aalborg Håndbold

=== Coaches ===
No.	Name	Period
1.	(Kosovo) Alfred Llazari	2014–2015
2.	(Kosovo) Taib Kabashi	2015–2016
3.	(Australia) Taip Ramadani → (Spain) Javier Cabanas	2016–2021 2020–2021
4.	(Belgium) Bujar Qerimi	2021–2025
5.	(Sweden) Jesper Östlund	2025–

=== Captains ===
- Ylber Mjeku (2014–2016)
- Valon Dedaj (2016-)

== Individual all-time records ==
=== Most matches played ===
As of 22 December 2022
Total number of matches played in official competitions only.

Rank	Player	Matches	Goals
1	Kastriot Jupa	56	189
2	Deniz Terziqi	43	136
3	Valon Dedaj	42	164
4	Drilon Tahirukaj	41	78
5	Luigj Quni	36	49
6	Egzon Gjuka	35	105
6	Lindrit Fetahu	35	60
8	Oltion Beshiri	34	63
9	Haris Berisha	33	1
10	Drenit Tahirukaj	28	82

=== Most goals scored ===
As of 22 December 2022
Total number of goals scored in official competitions only.

Rank	Player	Goals	Matches
1	Kastriot Jupa	189	56
2	Valon Dedaj	164	42
3	Deniz Terziqi	136	43
4	Egzon Gjuka	105	35
5	Drilon Tahirukaj	88	41
6	Drenit Tahirukaj	82	28
8	Florim Hoxha	81	28
8	Enis Kabashi	67	19
9	Oltion Beshiri	63	34
10	Kreshnik Krasniqi	60	24
10	Lindrit Fetahu	60	35

== Notes and references ==
=== Notes ===
1. Taip Ramadani during 2020 due to COVID-related travel restrictions could not join the team and so Cabanas was named as his replacement for the 2020 matches.
