= Javier Cabanas =

Spanish handball player (born 1960)

Personal information
- Full name: Juan Javier Cabanas López
- Nationality: Spanish
- Born: 24 April 1960 (age 66) Burgos, Spain
- Height: 1.80 m (5 ft 11 in)

Sport
- Sport: Handball
- Position: Right-wing
- Current club: Besa Famgas (manager); Kosovo (caretaker)

Senior clubs
- Years: Team
- 1978–1982: CB Calpisa
- 1982–1985: Barcelona
- 1985–1988: CB Tecnisán
- 1988–1994: GD Teka Cantabria
National team
Years	Team	Apps	(Gls)
1978–1993	Spain	228	(566)

Teams managed
- 1996–1999: CBM Maristas Alicante
- 2000–2007: Altea
- 2007–2008: Portland San Antonio
- 2015–2016: Ángel Ximénez
- 2016–2018: Balmazújvárosi
- 2018–2019: CB Santoña
- 2019–2020: Agustinos Alicante
- 2020–: Besa Famgas
- 2020–: Kosovo (caretaker)
- Updated on 20 March 1993

Juan Javier Cabanas López (born 24 April 1960), commonly known as Javier Cabanas is a Spanish former handball player and current coach of Besa Famgas and caretaker of the Kosovo national team. He was a member of the Spain men's national handball team. He was part of the team at the 1980 Summer Olympics, 1988 Summer Olympics and 1992 Summer Olympics.
