= Alfred Llazari =

Kosovan handball player

Personal information
- Full name: Alfred Llazari
- Nationality: Kosovan
- Born: 1961 (age 64–65) Mitrovica, FPR Yugoslavia

Sport
- Sport: Handball
- Position: Right wing

Youth career
- Years: Team
- –1977: Trepça

Senior clubs
- Years: Team
- 1977–1983: Trepça
- 1984–1985: Borci
- 1985–1986: Pelister
- 1986–1991: Prishtina

Teams managed
- 2007–2012: Kosovo
- 2014–2015: Kosovo

Alfred Llazari, known by the nickname Katoliku, is a Kosovan former handball manager and player. He was the head coach of Kosovo from 2007 until 2012 and from 2014 until 2015.
