= Sports in Gjilan =

Gjilan is known as a city of sport. The most common sports in Gjilan are football, basketball, handball, volleyball, karate and boxing.

== Football ==
Football is a popular sport in Gjilan. The first football team was established in 1936, with the name "Gajret" consisting mainly of Albanian players. On August 15, 1942, the club "Bashkimi" was formed in Gjilan, consisting mainly of Albanian players. It operated until just before the end of World War II. At the beginning of the year 1945, the football club "Crvena Zvezda" was established in Gjilan. For a long time this club was dominated by Serbian leaders and players. When Kosovo gained autonomy in 1945, Albanian footballers refused to compete for Crvena Zvezda and instead joined the club "Drita", which was formed years prior. From 1947 to 1952, this football club participated in the Second League of Kosovo. Its biggest success was in 2000 when it was declared the winner of the Cup and Super Cup of Kosovo. In 2018 it became the champion of football in Kosovo again and secured participation in the UEFA Champions League competitions. After the year 2000, there were two local teams, KF Drita and KF Gjilani. The Kosovo Derby between these two teams gathers a record number of attendees, usually between 10.000 and 15.000, no matter in which category the rival squads are. In June 2001 it was attended by a record 30,000 spectators. It is considered the biggest derby in Kosovo, one of the three biggest local derbies in the Balkans, and one of the 25 biggest local derbies in Europe, as well as one of the 50 biggest local derbies in the world.

== Volleyball ==
Volleyball as a sport was first seen at the “Mëhalla e Bejlerëve”. Until 1960 this particular sport was not officially structured and played, but in 1960 the first team was established, named "Partizani". In the years 1972 - 1973 the team was renamed to "Akademiku". Meanwhile the employees of the Textile Industry in Gjilan established "Tekstilisti". After the unification of "Tekstilisti" and "Akademiku" the team "Taftisoni" was established, which in 1981 - 1982 was declared Kosovo champion and successfully competed in the Second Federative League, until the Kosovan sport became independent and as a consequence the team was renamed to KV "Drita" like most of the other teams in Gjilan. Gjilan is known for females volleyball clubs too. KV "Drita" is known as one of the most important females club in Gjilan.

== Handball ==
Handball remains one of the sports has left its mark in Gjilan. Handball started in Gjilan in 1955. Three years later, the first club called "Partizani" was established. In 1962 the team organized the first international handball match in Gjilan with the "Taufiku" team from Egypt. At the start of the 1966-67 championship, the team was baptized with the name "Bozhuri", when better conditions were created for handball players. In 1991 the club was baptized "Drita". Women's handball began in 1960. The biggest successes came after the Kosovo War, when KH Drita participated in two finals.

== Basketball ==
Basketball in Gjilan began in 1956. Gjilan basketball reached its best in the first years after the Kosovo War. The first basketball team was named "Mlladost" and then it changed to "Drita". This team reached its biggest achievement in 1996 in it became champion of Kosovo. In 2001, for the first time, players from European countries came to the KB "Drita", improving the team's quality. In Gjilan there are also several women's basketball teams.

== Boxing ==
The boxing club “Partizani” was initiated during 1972–1973. In 1992, the club was labeled “Drita” and it was contributing in this field until 1997. It has scored plenty of successful achievements. Gjilan’s boxing in the past was considered as a nest from where most of the famous boxers came out and now with their successes achieved, they are managing to continue their work as coaches, transmitting their gained knowledge over the years to the youth of Gjilan. To highlight the results that came from Gjilan athletes in boxing there are many people that have merit, but one of the most prominent is the coach Rexhep Jahiu, who made Liridon and Fatlume to render their culminating sportsman.

== Karate ==
The first karate club in Gjilan "Zenel Hajdini" (later renamed "Drita") was formed in 1972. The biggest achievements of KK "Drita" are noted after the war, by being one of the best teams in Kosovo, with a large amount of international medals.

== Others ==
Other notable organized sports in Gjilan include chess, table-tennis and swimming.
