= Altınordu (disambiguation) =

Altınordu (literally "Golden horde") is a Turkish name that may refer to:

- Golden Horde, a medieval empire
- Altınordu, Ordu, a planned district in Ordu Province
- Altınordu S.K., a sports club in İzmir
- Altınordu İdman Yurdu SK, a defunct sports club in İstanbul
