= Nikola Prce =

Bosnian handball player (born 1980)

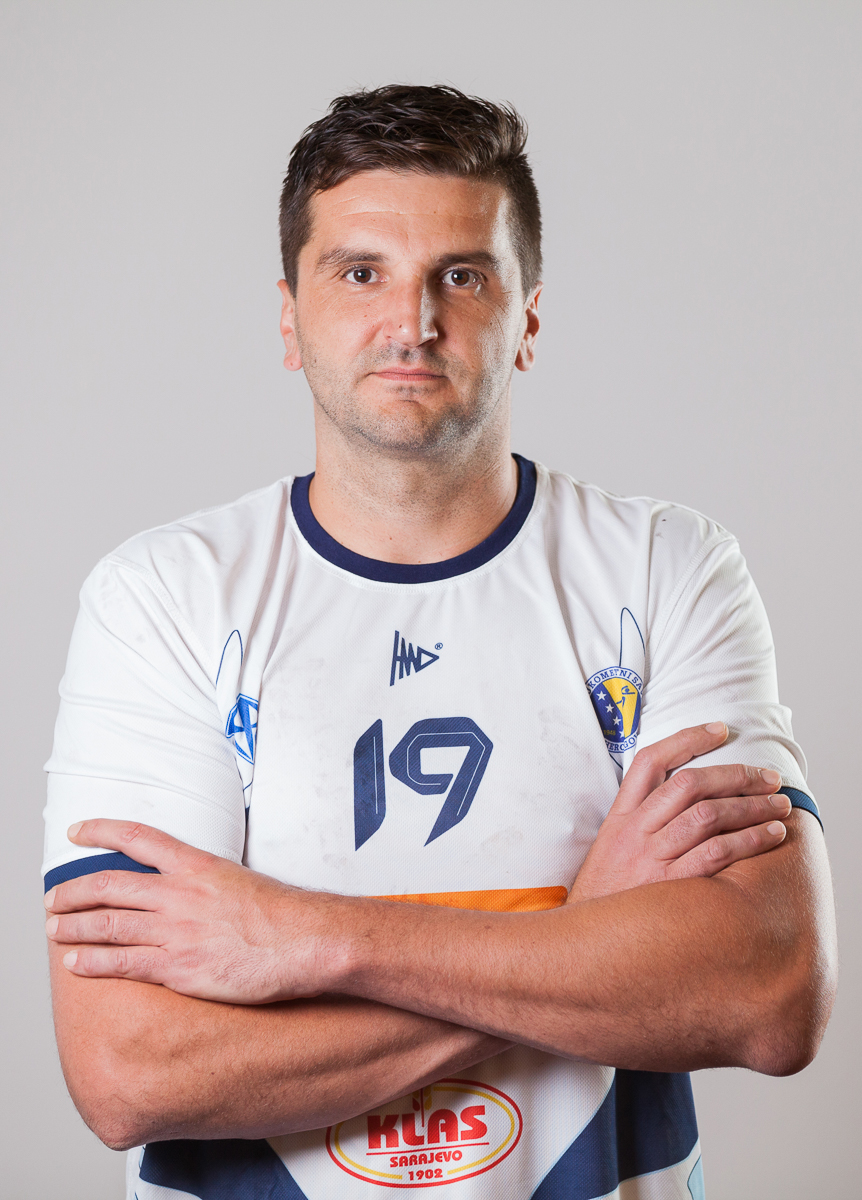

Personal information
- Nationality: Bosnian
- Born: 31 August 1980 (age 46) Čapljina, SFR Yugoslavia
- Height: 2.01 m (6 ft 7 in)

Sport
- Sport: Handball
- Position: Left-back
- Current club: KH BESA FamGas
- Number: 19

Youth career
- Years: Team
- 1994–1997: Čapljina
- 1997–1998: Badel 1862 Zagreb
- 1998–1999: Karlovac

Senior clubs
- Years: Team
- 2000–2001: Izviđač Ljubuški
- 2001–2002: Badel 1862 Zagreb
- 2002–2003: Torrevieja
- 2003–2004: Trimo Trebnje
- 2004–2006: Izviđač Ljubuški
- 2006–2007: Bregenz
- 2007–2009: Octavio Pilotes Posada
- 2009–2010: Ademar León
- 2010–2011: Puerto Sagunto
- 2011–2012: Ciudad de Logroño
- 2012–2013: Al-Sadd
- 2013–2014: Pick Szeged
- 2014–2019: KS Azoty-Puławy
- 2019–: KH BESA FamGas
National team
| Years | Team | Apps | (Gls) |
| 2006–2022 | Bosnia and Herzegovina | 119 | (444) |

Nikola Prce (born 31 August 1980) is a Bosnian handball player for KH BESA FamGas and the Bosnia and Herzegovina national team.

He is one of the best handball players and leader of a young generation of players in Bosnia and Herzegovina men's national handball team. Prce was honoured as Bosnia and Herzegovina "Sportsman of the Year" for 2014.

"As a child I practiced everything, football, basketball, and a bit of tennis. Then, handball section was founded in high school, so I decided to try it. We traveled all over Herzegovina and played matches with peers from other schools. It was very interesting and attracted me. I practiced basketball for a while, but in the end, those trips and socializing prevailed to the side of handball and I was not wrong", says Prce. Nikola debuted for the national team of Bosnia and Herzegovina on January 5, 2006, in the WC 2007 qualification match against the Netherlands. In 114 games played for the national team Prce scored 434 goals, which makes him the best scorer ever.

== Club career ==
Prce played for 16 different clubs, including: Čapljina (1994/97), RK Zagreb, (1997/98), HRK Karlovac (1998/99), RK Metković Jambo (1999/00), Izviđač (2000/01), RK Zagreb (2001/02), CB Torrevieja (2002/03), RK Trimo Trebnje (2003/04), Izviđač (2004/06), Bregenz Handball (2006/07), Octavio Vigo (2007/09), Ademar Leon (2009/10), BM Puerto Sagunto (2010/11), CB Ciudad de Logroño (2011/12), Al Saad (2012/2013) and Pick Szeged.

In the 2008–09 season, as a member of Octavio Vigo, he ended the season as the third best goal scorer of Liga ASOBAL, with 181 goals. He won the EHF Cup in the 2013–14 season with Pick Szeged.

Prce began his rich handball career as a teenager in his native Čapljina. He says that the start was like a dream, but then steadily throughout his career has had its ups and downs, sometime because of his iniquity, and some because he listened to the advice of various people around him.

After a great debut season in his native Čapljina, as a 16-year-old boy, Prce signed for RK Zagreb in 1996, one of the biggest clubs in the region. During the first season, although teenager, he recorded good performances and acquire the necessary experience by training with the first team along with regular education. Soon after he received an invitation for the U-17 Croatian national team. After one season in the Zagreb he went on loan to Karlovac, and then accept the offer of another Croatian first league member - Metkovic. Then he returns to his Herzegovina RK Izviđač from Ljubuski where, after one and a half season and qualifying matches for the EHF Champions League, was suspended in order to incorrect registration of the club. After a one-year suspension, he returned to Zagreb, and a year later he began his international career by going to the Spanish Torrevieja. After Torrevieja he goes to Slovenian Trimo, and then came back to Izviđač, where he spent two great seasons. Through the group stage of the EHF Champions League, they reached the EHF Cup and then the semi-final of the same competition. The turning point in his career was signing for Austrian Bregenz where he made a lot of progress with Dagur Sigurdson, the present coach of Germany national team and Berlin's coach. After the Austrian episode Prce returned to Spain. However, Prce says that most beautiful part of his career was in Puerto Sagunto and Spain cited as another country where he could live. "Spain is by far the most. It is a country where I could spend my life. Of course, after my California, as we like to call Herzegovina. Spaniards are temperamental people, especially in the south. They have a similar mentality as we really enjoyed it when I played there. In every club where I played we hung out, not only during the club's obligations, but also personally.Spaniards are very welcoming and friendly" says Prce. Zenith of his playing career he reached in late gaming years. With 34, after brief episodes in Lebanon and then in Germany where he played for Emsdetten, it seemed that the career is nearing an end. However, arriving fantastic performances for the national team in the January cycle, a month later came the offer from Pick Szeged, where did well thanks to coach Juan Carlos Pastor and teammates. He played phenomenal half-season and won the EHF Cup, the first European trophy in the club 's history . About 20,000 citizens of gave an unprecedented reception at square in Szeged.

== International career ==
Prce debuted for Bosnia and Herzegovina men's national handball team in qualifications for the 2006 European Handball Championship. In 112 games played for the national team Prce scored 428 goals, making him one of the most effective team members ever. Bosnia qualified for their first major tournament after they eliminated Iceland in two play-off matches for the 2015 World Men's Handball Championship. Prce was a key a figure with a total of 18 goals in two games. Because of that, he was honoured as Bosnian "Sportsman of the Year" for 2014. Upon receipt of this prestigious award, team captain said: " The dream of every athlete is to be the best in their country. Few people can expect to them to happen during career, and I got lucky . This is probably the greatest achievement in my career, maybe in life". In the qualifications for the Euro 2020, Prce was once again a key player. With 32 goals scored Nikola was the most effective player of his team. He was particularly brilliant in the decisive match against the Czech Republic when he, with 10 goals, led his team to the historic placement in the European Championship.

== Honours ==
- EHF Cup:
  - Winners (1) : 2014
- Handball Championship of Bosnia and Herzegovina:
  - Winners (3): 2001, 2004, 2005
- Handball Cup of Bosnia and Herzegovina:
  - Winners (1): 2001
- Croatian Handball Premier League:
  - Winners (1): 2002
- Qatar Stars League:
  - Winners (1): 2013
- Kosovar Handball Superliga:
  - Winners (4): 2020, 2021, 2022, 2023
- Kosovo Cup :
  - Winners (3): 2020, 2021, 2022
- Austrian Championship :
  - Winners (1): 2007
- Nemzeti Bajnokság I (men's handball):
  - Runners-up (1): 2014
- Magyar Kupa (men's handball):
  - Runners-up (1): 2014
- Emir of Qatar Cup:
  - Runners-up (1): 2013
- Qatar Cup:
  - Runners-up (1): 2013
- Polish Superliga (men's handball):
  - Third place (4): 2015, 2016, 2017, 2018
- Cup of Poland :
  - Runners-up (1): 2018

== Personal life ==
His father, Karlo Prce died in a car accident in 1988 and was a civil engineer and manager of a hotel. His mother Draga Prce was a cook. His sister Karolina is chief of operations in an insurance company. In July 2017 he married his longtime girlfriend, Nikolina Kovačić, Croatian volleyball player, who played in various international clubs and for the Croatian national team. Support of his family means a lot to him because they are always with him either in the best, but also during the most difficult moments. "As much as you need the work and perseverance, so you need to have the luck to find the right time in the right place. At least such is my experience. I had a funny way, caused by my faults but under the influence of others also. From an excellent start of my career, through suspension, incredible adventure and a set of circumstances at my age 35, I came to the summit of my career. My advice to young people is that they do not accept everyone's opinion, self-taught coach or manager. You need to do and believe in yourself. In every sport, there are plenty of people who are not professionals and can make it a difficult time in their career. It's hard when you get a bad name, and I felt it. The most important thing is to believe in themselves and in what they do", says Bosnian-Herzegovinian national team captain in his message to young athletes.

His plans for the future are still tied for handball: "I still enjoy handball and I feel good on the ground. I intend to play handball as long as my health allows me to".
