= Aziz Makiqi =

Yugoslav handball player

Personal information
- Full name: Aziz Makiqi
- Nationality: Yugoslav
- Born: 1958 Mitrovica, PR Serbia, FPR Yugoslavia

Sport
- Sport: Handball
- Position: Left back

Youth career
- Years: Team
- –1974: Trepça

Teams managed
- Years: Team
- 2002–2003: RK Umag

Aziz Makiqi (1958 – 5 June 2024) was a Kosovar Yugoslav former handball manager and player. He started his professional career with Trepça in 1974 and later played for many clubs in Europe including RK Istraturist Umag, Casino-PSK Kärnten, RK Proleter Zrenjanin and especially TuS Hofweier of the Handball-Bundesliga.

== Honours ==
KH Trepça

- Yugoslav Regional Championship: 1974–75

RK Istraturist Umag

- Yugoslav Second League: 1989–90
