= Minatori Sports Hall =

Sports hall in Mitrovica, Kosovo

"Minatori" Sports Hall
- Salla e Sporteve "Minatori" (sq)
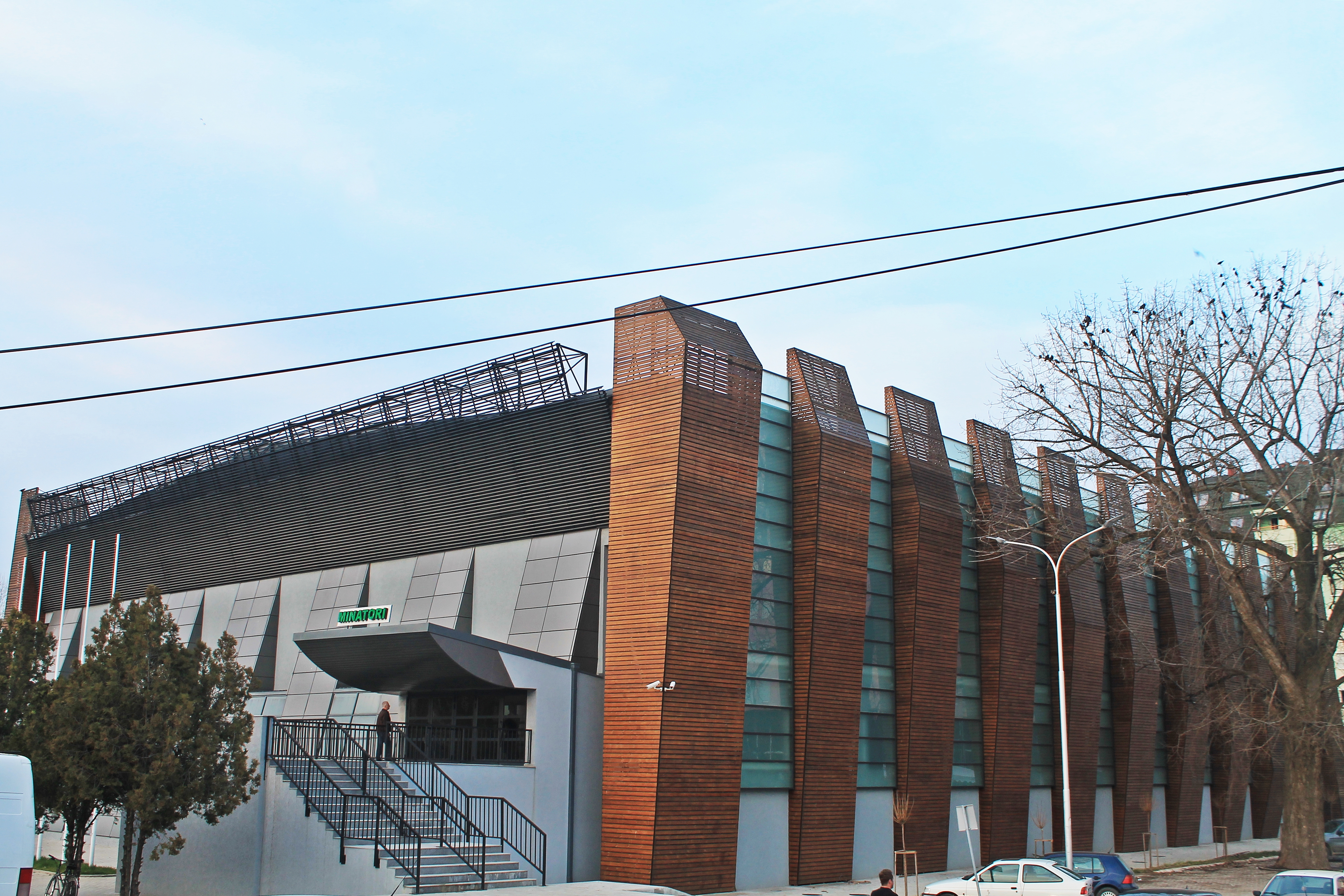
- Minatori Sports Hall after renovation in 2016
- Interactive map of "Minatori" Sports Hall
- Location: Mitrovica, Kosovo
- Coordinates: 42.890908°N 20.867235°E
- Owner: Mitrovica Municipality
- Capacity: 4,500
- Record attendance: 4,500

Construction
- Built: 1984
- Opened: 1984
- Renovated: 2013

Tenants
- KB Trepça; KH Trepça; KV Trepça; FC Trepça (futsal)

Minatori Sports Hall is a multi–use sports hall in Mitrovica, Kosovo which is the home of, the KB Trepça basketball, KH Trepça handball, KV Trepça volleyball and FC Trepça futsal teams.

== History ==
In July 2013 the Mitrovicë municipality decided on renovations to the sports hall. In September 2013, work began on a complete renovation of the sports hall with funding from the local governments and the European Union that amounted to €1.1 million. In September 2022, Minatori was the venue for the FIBA Europe Cup Qualification Group A where teams like KB Trepça, BG Göttingen, Antwerp Giants and Sporting CP played.

== Gallery ==
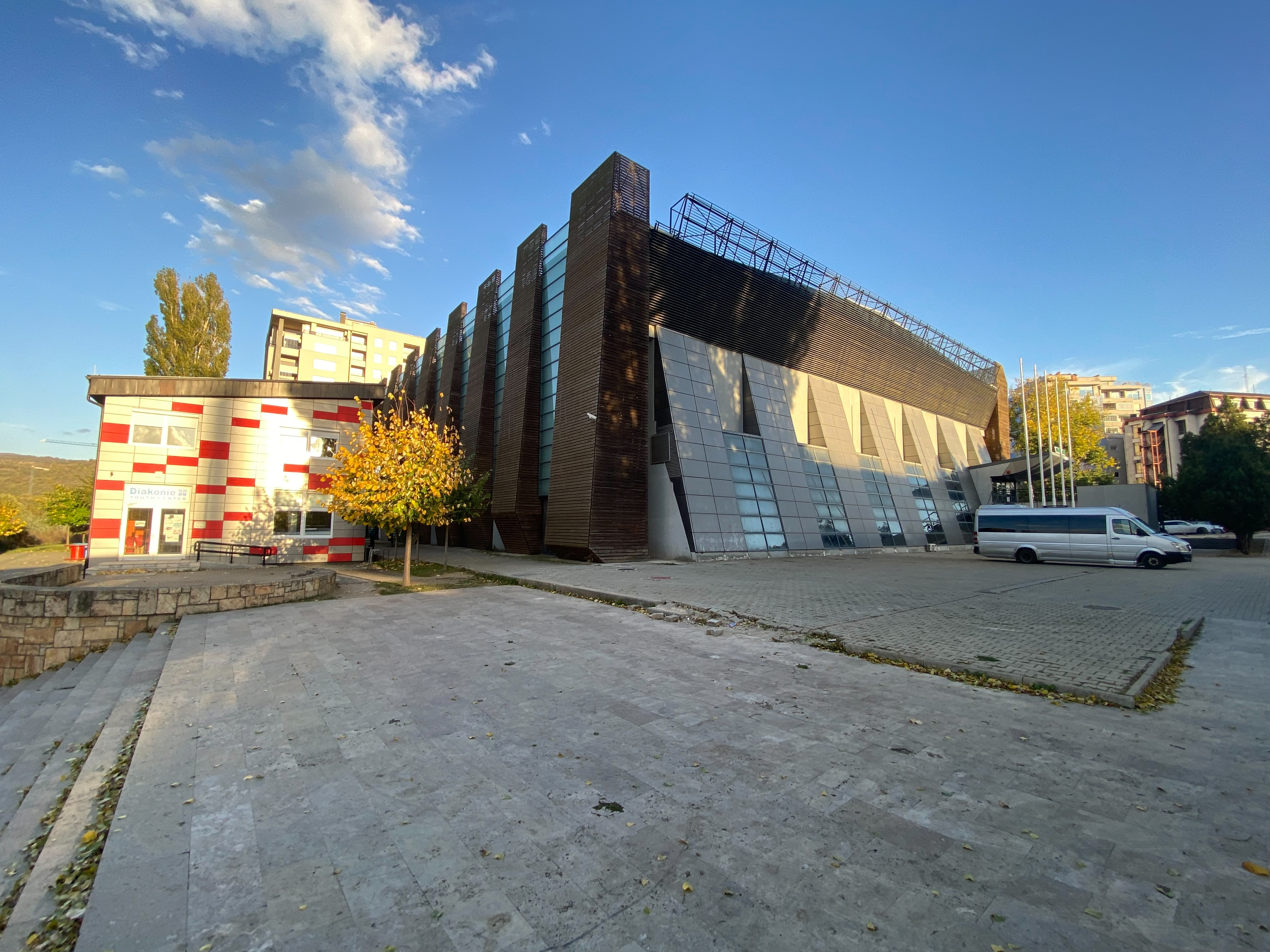

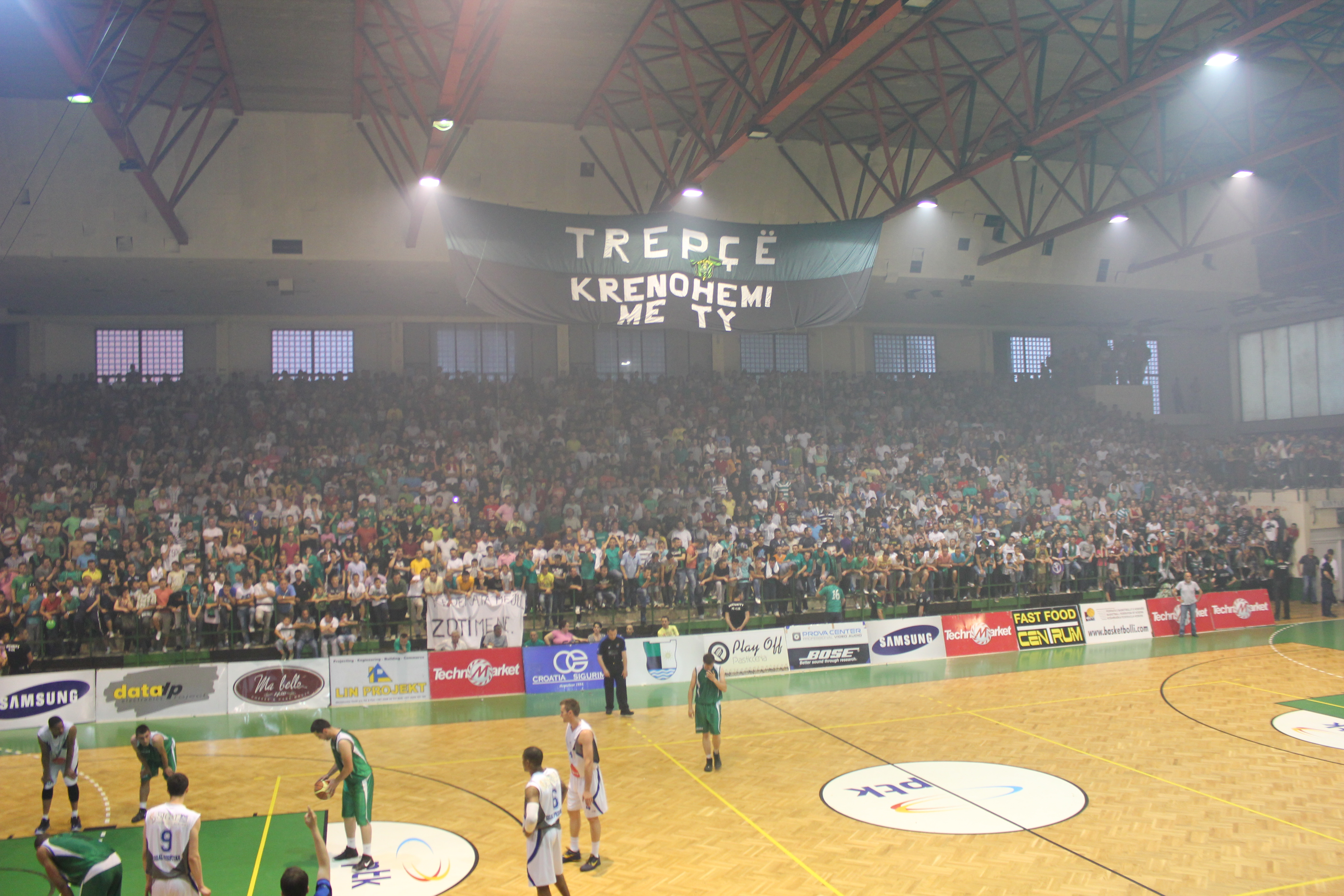

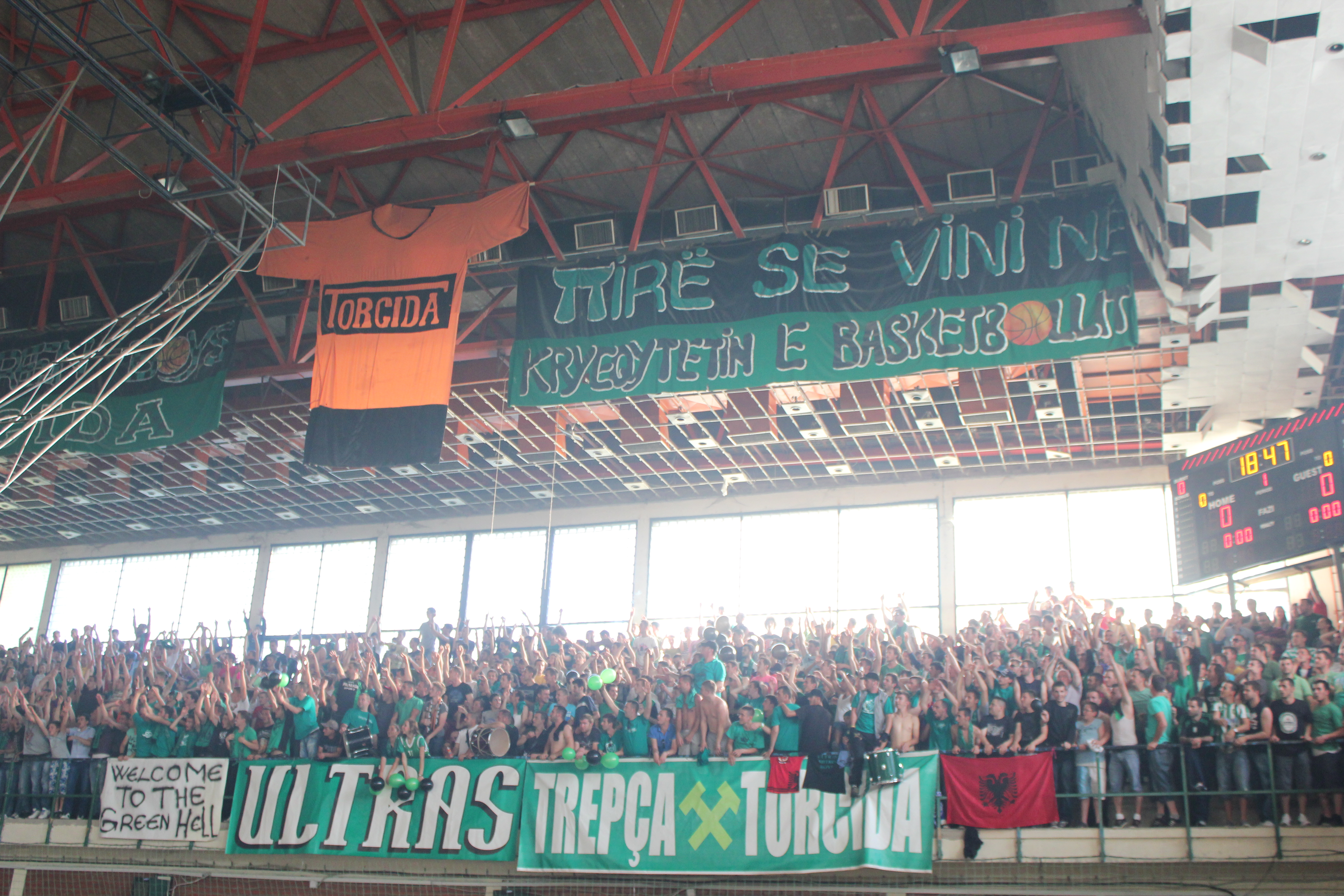

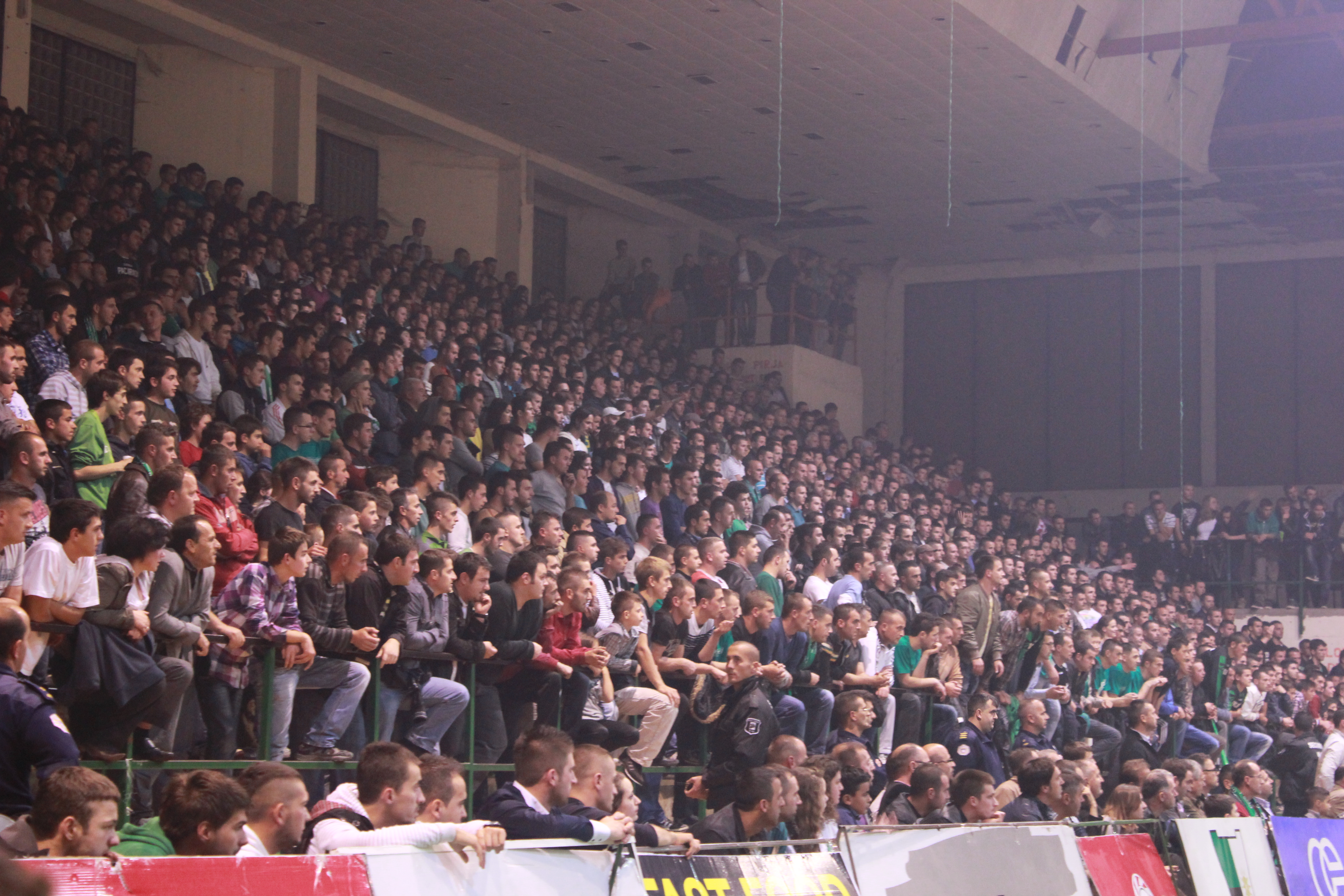

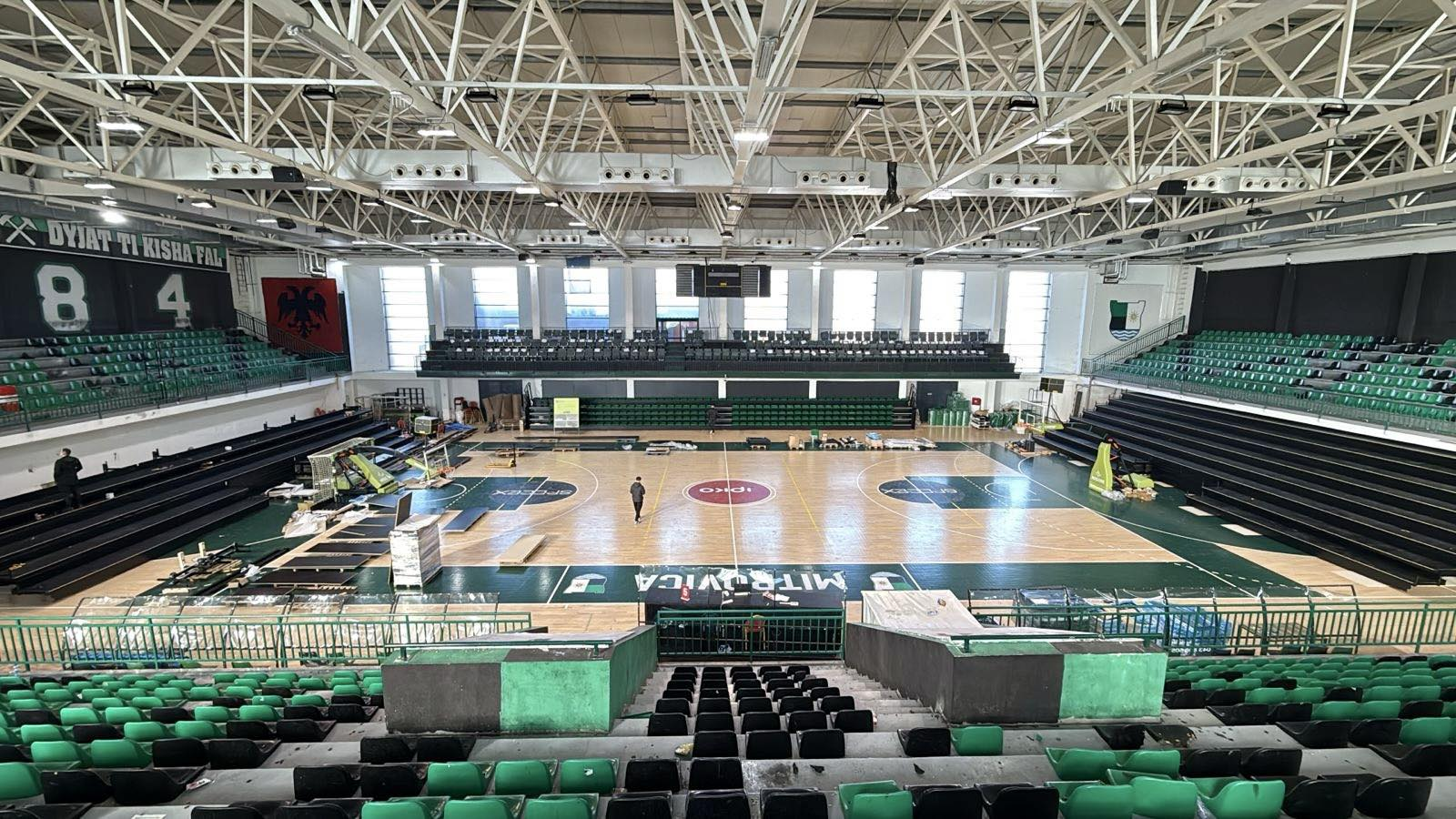

== See also ==
- List of indoor arenas in Kosovo
