= Başpehlivan Recep Kara Sports Hall =

Sport venue in Ordu, Turkey

Başpehlivan Recep Kara Sports Hall Başpehlivan Recep Kara Spor Salonu
- Interactive map of Başpehlivan Recep Kara Sports Hall; Başpehlivan Recep Kara Spor Salonu
- Location: Altınordu, Ordu, Turkey
- Coordinates: 40.983565°N 37.9235576°E
- Capacity: 2,000

Construction
- Opened: 2004; 22 years ago

Başpehlivan Recep Kara Sports Hall (Turkish: Başpehlivan Recep Kara Spor Salonu), shortly Recep Kara Sports Hall, formerly Durugöl Sports Hall ("Durugöl Spor Salonu") is a multi-purpose indoor arena in Ordu, northern Turkey.

== Overview ==
The indoor arena is situated at Altınordu District of Ordu Province in northern Turkey, and was opened in 2004. Initially called "Durugöl Sports Hall", it was renamed on 29 December 2016 in honor of Recep Kara (born 1982), a native four-time Kırkpınar-champion oil wrestler (Turkish: başpehlivan for "chief wrestler").

With its seating capacity for 2,000 spectators, it is the biggest sports hall in Ordu. In September 2020, the court floor of the sports hall was renovated. The court floor underwent another renovation started in October 2025.

== Usage ==
In October 2023, basketball matches of the "Kamu Spor Oyunları" ("Public Sports Games") were played at the sports hall. The 2023 Turkish Cadets Regional Team and Individual Table Tennis Competitions were held in the venue. The venue was home to the Turkish Juniors Judo Championships on 6 January 2026. It hosts the men's handball match of Turkey against Bulgaria at the 2028 European Championship qualification on 11 January 2026.

== See also ==
- List of indoor arenas in Turkey
