= Marouane Soussi =

Tunisian handball player

Personal information
- Nationality: Tunisian
- Born: 21 June 1988 (age 38) Menzel Horr
- Height: 1.94 m (6 ft 4 1/2 in)

Sport
- Sport: Handball
- Position: Goalkeeper
- Current club: Trepça

Senior clubs
- Years: Team
- –2017: Sakiet Ezzit
- 2017–2024: Club Africain
- 2024: Trepça
National team
Years	Team	Apps	(Gls)
2017	Tunisia	7	(0)

Marouane Soussi (born 21 June 1988) is a Tunisian handball player who last played for KH Trepça. He also played for the Tunisian national team.

He participated at the 2017 World Men's Handball Championship.
