= KH Drita =

Team in the Kosovar Handball Superliga

- Full name: Klubi Hendbollistik Drita
- Short name: Drita
- Founded: 1958
- Arena: Bashkim Selishta Sport Hall
- Capacity: 3.000
- President: Valon Murseli
- League: Kosovar Handball Superliga
- 2018-19: 1
- Club colours
Home	Away

KH Drita is a handball club based in Gjilan, Kosovo. KH Drita competes in the Kosovar Handball Superliga and the Kosovo Handball Cup.

== History ==
KH Drita was founded in 1958. Drita was the champion of the season 1997/98. But this championship was interrupted due to the Kosovo war.

== Titles ==
- Superliga:
  - Winners (1): 1998
- Yugoslav Regional Championship:
  - Winners (5): 1967, 1973, 1974, 1984, 1986
