= Handball Federation of Kosovo =

Governing body of handball in Kosovo

- Founded: 1953
- Type: Handball Federation
- Location: Pristina, Kosovo
- Region served: Kosovo
- Website: https://www.kosovahandball.info

The Handball Federation of Kosovo (Albanian: Federata e Hendbollit të Kosovës, Serbian: Рукометни савез Косова / Rukometni savez Kosova) is the governing body of team handball in Kosovo, based in Pristina. It is a member of the European Handball Federation and of the International Handball Federation.

== History ==
The Kosovo Handball Federation is the governing body of team handball in Kosovo, based in Pristina. It is a member of the European Handball Federation (EHF). The decision to accept Kosovo as an associated member was taken on 18 December 2004 at the European Congress of EHF, held in Budapest. With associated status in EHF, Kosovo was without voting rights the assembly of the European Handball Federation. However, Kosovo could take part in qualification for the Men's EHF EURO 2018 pending a congress decision on full membership in September 2014. Kosovo Handball Federation become full member of European Handball Federation in 2014 when the member nations of the EHF have decided at the EHF Congress to grant full membership to the handball association of Kosovo, making it the 50th member federation.

During the Yugoslavian era, Kosovo had own Superleague and lower divisions in both genders.

In the 1990s, Kosovo declared political and sports independence from Yugoslavian system, organising its own league based with different teams from seven major cities of Kosovo.

From 2004, Besa Famiglia, HC Prishtina, HC Kstrioti (men) and HC Vëllaznimi, HC Prishtina, HC Kastrioti, HC Kosova, HC VIcianet (women), participated in different European cups qualifications, and the best success remains, being qualified for one round. However, HC Prishtina wrote history for the country of Kosova, because they qualified in the second round after beating Junior Fassano (ITA) in two legs played.

== Domestic competitions ==
It organises the Kosovar Championship and Cup. In the 2006–2007 club competition season in Europe, Kosovo had five clubs participate: KH Besa Famiglia Pejä, KH Kastrioti Ferizaj, KH Kosovo Vushtrri, KH Vellaznimi Gjakove, and KH Vicianet Vushtrri.

== International competitions hosted by the HFK ==
- 2015 IHF Emerging Nations Championship
- 2019 IHF Inter-Continental Trophy
