= Samadrexhë =

Samadrexhë: Samadrexhë (Albanian); Самодража/Samodraža (Serbian)
- Village
- Location within Kosovo
- Coordinates: 42°21′49″N 20°44′25″E
- Location: Kosovo
- District: Prizren
- Municipality: Suharekë
- Elevation: 424 m (1,391 ft)

Population (2024)
  - Total: 2,021
- Time zone: UTC+01:00 (CET)
  - Summer (DST): UTC+02:00 (CEST)

Samadrexhë (Albanian: Samadrexhë, Serbian Cyrillic: Самодража/Samodraža) is a village in Suharekë municipality, Kosovo.
