= Altınordu, Ordu =

Second-level municipality in Turkey

Altınordu
- District and municipality
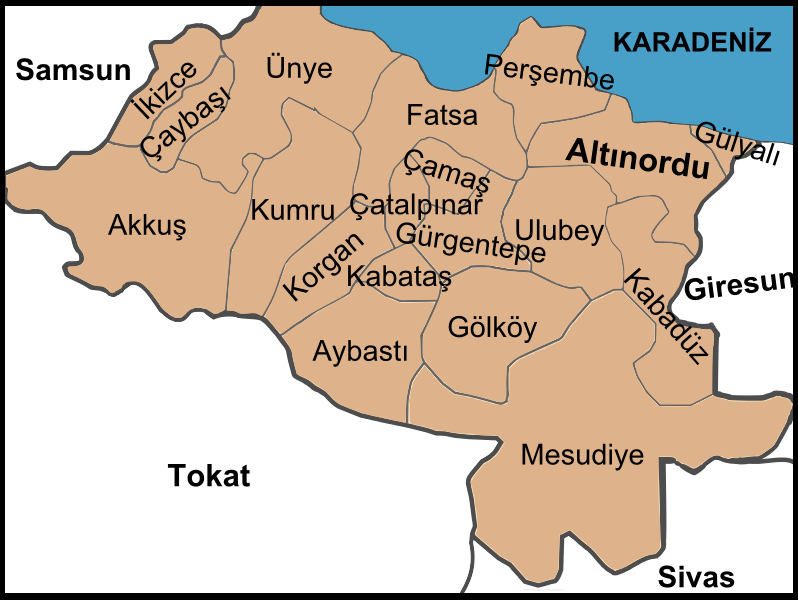
- Map showing Altınordu District in Ordu Province

- Location in Turkey
- Coordinates: 40°58′N 37°54′E
- Country: Turkey
- Province: Ordu

Government
  - Mayor: Ulaş Tepe (CHP)
- Area: 410 km^{2} (160 sq mi)
- Elevation: 35 m (115 ft)
- Population (2022): 235,096
  - Density: 570/km^{2} (1,500/sq mi)
- Time zone: UTC+3 (TRT)
- Area code: 0452
- Website: www.altinordu.bel.tr

Altınordu is municipality and district of Ordu Province, Turkey. Its area is 410 km^{2}, and its population is 235,096 (2022). It covers the agglomeration of Ordu and the adjacent countryside. The current acting mayor is Ulaş Tepe (CHP).

The district Altınordu was created at the 2013 reorganisation from the former central district of Ordu Province. Its name means Golden Horde, a historical empire.

== Composition ==
There are 91 neighbourhoods in Altınordu District:

- Akçatepe
- Akkese
- Akyazı
- Alembey
- Alınca
- Alisayvan
- Altınyurt
- Arpaköy
- Artıklı
- Ataköy
- Aydınlık
- Aziziye
- Bahariye
- Bahçelievler
- Bayadı
- Bayramlı
- Boztepe
- Bucak
- Burhanettinköy
- Çavuşlar
- Cumhuriyet
- Dedeli
- Delikkaya
- Dikence
- Durugöl
- Düz
- Düzköy
- Emenköy
- Erenli
- Eskipazar
- Eyüplü
- Gerce
- Gökömer
- Gümüşköy
- Günören
- Güzelyalı
- Güzelyalı
- Hacılar
- Hatipli
- Hürriyet
- Işıklı
- Karaağaç
- Karacaömer
- Karaoluk
- Karapınar
- Karşıyaka
- Kayabaşı
- Kayadibi
- Kirazlimanı
- Kısacık
- Kızılhisar
- Kökenli
- Kovancı
- Kumbaşı
- Kurtulmuş
- Kuylu
- Mübarek
- Nizamettin
- Öceli
- Oğmaca
- Örencik
- Orhaniye
- Ortaköy
- Osmaniye
- Övündük
- Pelitli
- Sağırlı
- Şahincili
- Saray
- Saraycık
- Şarkiye
- Selimiye
- Şenköy
- Şenocak
- Şirinevler
- Subaşı
- Taşbaşı
- Terzili
- Teyneli
- Topluca
- Uzunisa
- Uzunmusa
- Yağızlı
- Yaraşlı
- Yemişli
- Yenimahhalle
- Yeşilköy
- Yıldızlı
- Yukarıtepe
- Zaferimilli
- Zaferköy

== Sport ==
The 2004-opened Durugöl Sports Hall, which was renamed end 2016 to Başpehlivan Recep Kara Sports Hall, is located in Altınordu.
