= KH Kastrioti =

- Full name: Klubi Hendbollistik; Kastrioti Ferizaj
- Founded: 1958
- Arena: Hall Bill Clinton, Ferizaj
- Capacity: 2,500
- League: Superliga Meshkujt
- Club colours
Home	Away

KH Kastrioti is a team handball club from Ferizaj, Kosovo. KH Kastrioti competes in the Superliga Meshkujt and the Kosovo Handball Cup, and it is one of the most famous handball clubs with traditional titles and champions.

== Crest, colours, supporters ==
=== Kits ===
HOME
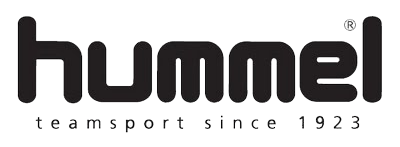
2018–19

AWAY
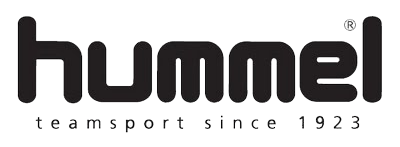
2018–19

== Titles ==
- Superliga:
  - Winners (6): 1992, 1993, 2000, 2010, 2011, 2026
- Kosovo Cup:
  - Winners (9): 1992, 2004, 2006, 2007, 2009, 2019, 2024, 2025, 2026
- Kosovar Supercup:
  - Winners (1): 2026

== European record ==
Season	Competition	Round	Club	1st leg	2nd leg	Aggregate
2010-11	EHF Cup	R1	(Luxembourg) HB Dudelange	17-30	23-28	40-58
2011-12	EHF Cup	R1	(Montenegro) RK Sutjeska Nikšić	25-35	27-30	52-65
2015-16	Challenge Cup	R2	(Serbia) Radnički Kragujevac	27-33	26-32	53–65
2016-17	Challenge Cup	R3	(Slovakia) HKM Sala	29–31	22–29	51–60
2018-19	Challenge Cup	R2	(Estonia) HC Tallinn	25–22	26–25	51–47
2018-19	Challenge Cup	R3	(Belgium) HC Visé BM	21–33	26–38	47–71
2019–20	Challenge Cup	R2	(Czech Republic) HC Dukla Prague	26–39	23–39	49–78
2022–23	European Cup	R1	(Bosnia and Herzegovina) Gračanica	22–36	22–36	44–72
2024–25	European Cup	R1	(Bosnia and Herzegovina) RK Sloboda	30–29	28–32	58–61
2025–26	European Cup	R2	(Luxembourg) Red Boys Differdange	26–29	28–31	54–60
2026–27	European Cup	R2	(Italy) Raimond Sassari	28–37	27–40	55–77
