= KH Besa Famgas =

Kosovar handball club

- Full name: Klubi Hendbollistik Besa Famgas
- Short name: KH Besa
- Founded: 1953; 73 years ago
- Arena: Sport Hall "Karagaci", Peja
- League: Kosovar Handball Superliga
- Club colours
| Home | Away |

KH Besa Famgas is a team handball club from Peja in western Kosovo. KH BESA Famgas competes in the Kosovar Superliga and Cup, and it is one of the most famous handball clubs with traditional titles and champions.

Location of KH Besa Famgas

== History ==
KH Besa Famgas was founded in 1953 in Peja. They competed in the Yugoslav regional camp of Kosovo and in the second Yugoslav league, then still called Buduçnosti. During the Yugoslav era they won the regional championship twice. In 1991, KH Besa Famgas like many other Kosovan clubs left the Yugoslav handball league system because Kosovo proclaimed independence from Serbia and they started competing in the Superliga. During its history, it has won the Superliga 19 times and the Kosovo Cup 14 times.

== Crest, colours, supporters ==
=== Kits ===
HOME
| 2016–17 | 2017–19 | 2021–23 |

AWAY
| 2018–19 | 2021-23 |

== Team ==
=== Current squad ===
Squad for the 2023–24 season

KH Besa Famgas

Goalkeepers

- 1 (Kosovo) Mursel Mehmeti
- 12 (Kosovo) Olt Kabashi

Left Wingers

- 8 (Kosovo) Ilir Istrefaj
- 11 (Kosovo) Erion Bajramaj
- 22 (Kosovo) Jon Vokshi

Right Wingers

- 15 (Croatia) Antonio Vozila

Line Players

- 7 (Lebanon) Ali Hassan
- 26 (Kosovo) Edonis Hajra
- 68 (Kosovo) Endrit Dinaj
- 98 (Kosovo) Ardit Tafilaj

Central Backs

- 10 (Bosnia and Herzegovina) Ajdin Smailbegović
- 99 (Kosovo) Amar Muqolli

Left Backs

- 4 (Moldova) Igor Chiseliov
- 13 (Kosovo) Olsi Mulaj
- 19 (Bosnia and Herzegovina) Nikola Prce

Right Backs

- 23 (Kosovo) Arbios Mushkolaj

=== Transfers ===
Transfers for the 2023–24 season

Joining

- (Moldova) Igor Chiseliov (LB) from (Turkey) Köyceğiz Belediyespor

Leaving

== Titles ==
- Yugoslav Regional Championship:
  - Winners (2): 1961, 1991
- Superliga:
  - Winners (19): 1996, 1997, 2002, 2003, 2004, 2005, 2006, 2007, 2012, 2014, 2015, 2016, 2017, 2018, 2019, 2020, 2021, 2022, 2023
- Kosovo Cup:
  - Winners (14): 1996, 2003, 2005, 2010, 2011, 2012, 2014, 2015, 2016, 2017, 2018, 2020, 2021, 2022
- Kosovar SuperCup:
  - Winners (2): 2022, 2023

== EHF ranking ==
As of 29/3/2024

| Rank | Team | Points |
|---|---|---|
| 88 | (Slovenia) MRK Krka | 62 |
| 89 | (Norway) Drammen HK | 61 |
| 90 | (Romania) CSM Constanța | 60 |
| 91 | (Kosovo) KH Besa Famgas | 59 |
| 92 | (Luxembourg) Handball Esch | 59 |
| 93 | (Belgium) HC Visé BM | 59 |
| 94 | (Romania) AHC Potaissa Turda | 58 |

== Former club members ==
=== Notable former players ===
- (Algeria) Mokhtar Kouri (2019–2020)
- (Bosnia and Herzegovina) Nikola Prce (2019–)
- (Greece) Charalampos Mallios (2020–2021)
- (North Macedonia) Daniel Dupjačanec (2010–2012, 2013–2015)
- (Spain) Victor Alonso (2020–2022)

== See also ==
- KF Besa Pejë (football)
- KB Besa (basketball)
