= Kosovar Handball Superliga =

- Sport: Handball
- Founded: 1955
- No. of teams: 8
- Country: Kosovo
- Confederation: EHF
- Most recent champions: KH Kastrioti (6 title)
- Most titles: KH BESA Famiglia (19 titles)
- International cups: EHF Cup; EHF Challenge Cup
- Website: http://www.kosovahandball.info/sq/Superleague_male

The Kosovar Superliga is the name of the handball league of Kosovo.

== Competition format ==
The season begins with a regular season between the ten teams. The first six teams qualifies for a first play-off round, while the last four plays a play-down round. At the end of this second round, the first four teams plays elimination rounds.

== 2026/27 Season participants ==
The following 7 clubs compete in the Superliga during the 2026/27 season:

Team	City	Arena
KH Besa Famgas	Pejë	Sport Hall "Karagaci"
KH Rahoveci	Rahovec	Palestra "Mizahr Isma"
KH Prishtina	Prishtinë	Palestra "Pallati i Rinisë dhe Sporteve"
KH Kastrioti	Ferizaj	Palestra '"Bill Clinton"
KH Llapi	Podujevë	Palestra "Hakif Zejnullahu"
KH Vëllaznimi	Gjakovë	Palestra ‘’Shani Nushi”
KH Deçani	Deçan	Palestra e qytetit në Deçan

The following 6 clubs compete in the First League during the 2026/27 season:

Team	City	Arena
KH Ulpiana	Lipjan	Palestra "Better Life Center"
KH Prizreni	Prizren	Palestra "Sezai Surroi"
KH Istogu	Istog	Palestra "Salla Sporteve Istog"
KH Drenica	Drenicë	Palestra në Drenicë
KH Vushtrria	Vushtrri	Palestra e qytetit në Vushtrri
KH Trepça	Mitrovicë	Palestra ‘’Minatori’’

The following 9 clubs compete in the Women Superliga during the 2026/27 season:

Team	City	Arena
KHF Besa	Pejë	Sport Hall "Karagaci"
KHF Samadrexha	Samadrexhë	Palestra "Afrim Bunjaki"
KHF Prishtina	Prishtinë	Palestra "Pallati i Rinisë dhe Sporteve"
KHF Kastrioti	Ferizaj	Palestra '"Bill Clinton"
KHF Tereza	Obiliq	Palestra
KHF Shqiponja	Gjakovë	Palestra ‘’Shani Nushi”
KHF Istogu	Istog	Palestra ‘’”
KHF Ferizaj	Ferizaj	Palestra ‘’Bill Clinton”
KHF Ulpiana	Lipjan	Palestra ‘’Beter Life Center’’

The following 7 clubs compete in the Women First League during the 2026/27 season:

Team	City	Arena
KHF Vushtrria	Vushtrri	Palestra e Qytetit
KHF Click	Prizren	Palestra "Sezai Surroi"
KHF Trepça	Mitrovicë	Palestra "Minatori"
KHF Keku	Obiliq	Palestra në Obiliq
KHF Jusuf Gërvalla	Deçan	Palestra në Deçan
KHF Dukagjini	Klinë	Palestra në Klinë
KHF Vjosa	Shtime	Palestra në Shtime

== Superliga past champions ==
=== Yugoslav regional championship ===
Until 1991, Kosovo was part of Yugoslavia. The Handball Federation of Kosovo does not consider the title before this date because some teams played (Borac,Trepça, Bozhuri, Prishtina, Vëllaznimi, Samadrexha, Kosova) in first or second Yugoslav League and hence did not play Kosovo first league.

- 1955 : Normalisti
- 1956 : Normalisti (2)
- 1957 : Normalisti (3)
- 1958 : Normalisti (4)
- 1959 : Normalisti (5)
- 1960 : Normalisti (6)
- 1961 : Buduçnosti
- 1962 : KH Vëllazmini
- 1963 : KH Vëllazmini (2)
- 1964 : Prizreni
- 1965 : KH Kosova
- 1966 : Obiliqi
- 1967 : KH Bozhuri
- 1968 : KH Trepça
- 1969 : KH Vëllazmini (3)
- 1970 : KH Drenica
- 1971 : KH Vëllazmini (4)
- 1972 : Obiliqi (2)
- 1973 : KH Bozhuri (2)
- 1974 : KH Bozhuri (3)
- 1975 : KH Trepça (2)
- 1976 : KH Prishtina
- 1977 : KH Vëllazmini (5)
- 1978 : Samadrexha
- 1979 : KH Vëllazmini (6)
- 1980 : KH Deçani
- 1981 : KNI Ramiz Sadiku
- 1982 : KH Kosova (2)
- 1983 : KH Vëllazmini (7)
- 1984 : KH Bozhuri (4)
- 1985 : KH Vëllazmini (8)
- 1986 : KH Bozhuri (5)
- 1987 : KH Kosova (3)
- 1988 : KH Vëllazmini (9)
- 1989 : KH Prishtina (2)
- 1990 : KH Trepça (3)
- 1991 : Buduçnosti (2)

	Club	Titles	Years
1.	KH Vëllaznimi	9	1962, 1963, 1969, 1971, 1977, 1979, 1983, 1985, 1988
2.	KH Normalisti	6	1955, 1956, 1957, 1958, 1959, 1960
3.	KH Bozhuri	5	1967, 1973, 1974, 1984, 1986
4.	KH Kosova	3	1965, 1982, 1987
5.	KH Trepça	3	1968, 1975, 1990
6.	Buduçnosti	2	1961, 1991
7.	KH Obiliqi	2	1962, 1972
8.	KH Prishtina	2	1976, 1989
9.	KH Prizreni	1	1964
10.	KH Drenica	1	1970
11.	KH Samadrexha	1	1978
12.	KH Deçani	1	1980
13.	KH Ramiz Sadiku	1	1981

=== Kosovar national championship ===
According to Handball Federation of Kosovo, the first Kosovar national championship was played in 1991/92.

- 1992 : KH Kastrioti
- 1993 : KH Kastrioti (2)
- 1994 : KH Trepça
- 1995 : KH Prishtina
- 1996 : KH BESA (1)
- 1997 : KH BESA (2)
- 1998 : KH Drita
- 1999 : not held because of the Kosovo War
- 2000 : KH Kastrioti (3)
- 2001 : KH Trepça (2)
- 2002 : KH BESA (3)
- 2003 : KH BESA (4)
- 2004 : KH BESA (5)
- 2005 : KH BESA Famiglia (6)
- 2006 : KH BESA Famiglia (7)
- 2007 : KH BESA Famiglia (8)
- 2008 : KH Prishtina (2)
- 2009 : KH Prishtina (3)
- 2010 : KH Kastrioti (4)
- 2011 : KH Kastrioti (5)
- 2012 : KH BESA Famiglia (9)
- 2013 : KH Prishtina (4)
- 2014 : KH BESA Famiglia (10)
- 2015 : KH BESA Famiglia (11)
- 2016 : KH BESA Famiglia (12)
- 2017 : KH BESA FamGas (13)
- 2018 : KH BESA FamGas (14)
- 2019 : KH BESA FamGas (15)
- 2020 : KH BESA FamGas (16)
- 2021 : KH BESA FamGas (17)
- 2022 : KH BESA FamGas (18)
- 2023 : KH BESA FamGas (19)
- 2024 : KH Rahoveci (1)
- 2025 : KH Rahoveci (2)
- 2026 : KH Kastrioti (6)

	Club	Titles	Years
1.	KH BESA FamGas	19	1996, 1997, 2002, 2003, 2004, 2005, 2006, 2007, 2012, 2014, 2015, 2016, 2017, 2018, 2019, 2020, 2021, 2022, 2023
2.	KH Kastrioti	6	1992, 1993, 2000, 2010, 2011, 2026
3.	KH Prishtina	4	1995, 2008, 2009, 2013
4.	KH Trepça	2	1994, 2001
5.	KH Rahoveci	2	2024, 2025
6.	KH Drita	1	1998

== Kosovar Cup winners ==
- 1992 : Kastrioti
- 1993 : Prishtina
- 1994 : Trepça
- 1995 : Llapi
- 1996 : Besa
- 1997 : Vëllaznimi
- 1998 : not held
- 1999 : not held
- 2000 : Prizreni
- 2001 : Prishtina (2)
- 2002 : Trepça (2)
- 2003 : Besa (2)
- 2004 : Kastrioti (2)
- 2005 : Besa (3)
- 2006 : Kastrioti (3)
- 2007 : Kastrioti (4)
- 2008 : Prishtina (3)
- 2009 : Kastrioti (5)
- 2010 : Besa Famiglia (4)
- 2011 : Besa Famiglia (5)
- 2012 : Besa Famiglia (6)
- 2013 : Prishtina (4)
- 2014 : Besa Famiglia (7)
- 2015 : Besa Famiglia (8)
- 2016 : Besa Famiglia (9)
- 2017 : Besa FamGas (10)
- 2018 : Besa FamGas (11)
- 2019 : Kastrioti (6)
- 2020 : Besa Famgas (12)
- 2021 : Besa Famgas (13)
- 2022 : Besa Famgas (14)
- 2023 : Trepça (3)
- 2024 : Kastrioti (7)
- 2025 : Kastrioti (8)
- 2026 : Kastrioti (9)

	Club	Titles	Year
1.	KH BESA FamGas	14	1996, 2003, 2005, 2010, 2011, 2012, 2014, 2015, 2016, 2017, 2018, 2020, 2021, 2022
2.	KH Kastrioti	9	1992, 2004, 2006, 2007, 2009, 2019, 2024, 2025, 2026
3.	KH Prishtina	4	1993, 2001, 2008, 2013
4.	KH Trepça	3	1994, 2002, 2023
5.	KH Prizreni	1	2000
6.	KH Vëllaznimi	1	1997
7.	KH Llapi	1	1995

== Kosovar SuperCup winners ==
- 2022 : Besa Famgas
- 2023 : Besa Famgas (2)
- 2024 : Rahoveci
- 2025 : Rahoveci (2)
- 2026 : Kastrioti

	Club	Titles	Year
1.	KH BESA FamGas	2	2022, 2023
2.	KH Rahoveci	2	2024, 2025
2.	KH Kastrioti	1	2026

== Awards ==
Year	Best Player
2025	Egzon Gjuka (5)
2024	Egzon Gjuka (4)
2023	Egzon Gjuka (3)
2022	Egzon Gjuka (2)
2021	Egzon Gjuka
2020	Kastriot Jupa (6)
2019	Kastriot Jupa (5)
2018	Deniz Terziqi
2017	Kastriot Jupa (4)
2016	Kastriot Jupa (3)
2015	Kastriot Jupa (2)
2014	Kastriot Jupa
2013	
2012	
2011	Kreshnik Krasniqi
2010	Enis Kabashi
2009	
2008	
2007	
2006	Arben Muqolli (6)
2005	Arben Muqolli (5)
2004	Arben Muqolli (4)
2003	Arben Muqolli (3)
2002	Arben Muqolli (2)
2001	Arben Muqolli

== EHF coefficient ranking ==
For season 2017/2018, see footnote:

- 27. (36) (Iceland) Olís deildin (7.00)
- 28. (34) (Estonia) Meistriiliga (6.83)
- 29. (29) (Kosovo) Superliga (6.67)
- 30. (21) (Luxembourg) Sales Lentz League (6.00)
- 30. (25) (Israel) Ligat Winner (6.00)

|}

== Woman Superliga past champion ==
=== Yugoslav regional championship ===
- 1972 : Buduçnosti
- 1973 : Prishtina
- 1974 : Trepça
- 1975 : Ibri
- 1976 : Kastrioti
- 1977 : Deçani
- 1978 : Mokra Gora
- 1979 : Trepça (2)
- 1980 : Vushtrria
- 1981 : Prizreni
- 1982 : Vëllaznimi
- 1983 : Prishtina (2)
- 1984 : Deçani (2)
- 1985 : Deçani (3)
- 1986 : Trepça (3)
- 1987 : Prishtina (3)
- 1988 : Samadrexha
- 1989 : Elektroekonomia
- 1990 : Samadrexha (2)
- 1991 : Trepça (4)

=== Kosovar national championship ===
According to Handball Federation of Kosovo, the first Kosovar national championship was played in 1991/92.

- 1992 :
- 1993 :
- 1994 :
- 1995 : Vjosa
- 1996 : Vjosa (2)
- 1997 : Prishtina
- 1998 : Samadrexha
- 1999 : not held because of the Kosovo War
- 2000 : Kastrioti
- 2001 : Kastrioti (2)
- 2002 : Kastrioti (3)
- 2003 : Kastrioti (4)
- 2004 : Vushtrria
- 2005 : Vushtrria (2)
- 2006 : Samadrexha (2)
- 2007 : Samadrexha (3)
- 2008 : Vushtrria (3)
- 2009 : Vushtrria (4)
- 2010 : Prishtina (2)
- 2011 : Prishtina (3)
- 2012 : Prishtina (4)
- 2013 : Kastrioti (5)
- 2014 : Kastrioti (6)
- 2015 : Kastrioti (7)
- 2016 : Prishtina (5)
- 2017 : Prishtina (6)
- 2018 : Shqiponja
- 2019 : Istogu
- 2020 : Ferizaj
- 2021 : Vushtrria (5)
- 2022 : Istogu (2)
- 2023 : Istogu (3)
- 2024 : Istogu (4)
- 2025 : Istogu (5)
- 2026 : Samadrexha (4)

	Club	Titles	Years
1.	KHF Kastrioti	7	2000, 2001, 2002, 2003, 2013, 2014, 2015
2.	KHF Prishtina	6	1997, 2010, 2011, 2012, 2016, 2017
3.	KHF Vushtrria	5	2004, 2005, 2008, 2009, 2021
4.	KHF Istogu	5	2019, 2022, 2023, 2024, 2025
5.	KHF Samadrexha	4	1998, 2006, 2007, 2026
6.	KHF Vjosa	2	1995, 1996
7.	KHF Ferizaj	1	2020
8.	KHF Shqiponja	1	2018

== Woman Kosovar Cup winners ==
- 1994 : Vjosa
- 1995 : Prishtina
- 1996 : Kastrioti
- 1997 : Prishtina (2)
- 1998 : not held
- 1999 : not held
- 2000 : Trepça
- 2001 : Vjosa (2)
- 2002 : Kastrioti (2)
- 2003 : Vushtrria
- 2004 : Prishtina (3)
- 2005 : Vushtrria (2)
- 2006 : Samadrexha
- 2007 : Vushtrria (3)
- 2008 : Prishtina (4)
- 2009 : Prishtina (5)
- 2010 : Kastrioti (3)
- 2011 : Prishtina (6)
- 2012 : Prishtina (7)
- 2013 : Kastrioti (4)
- 2014 : Kastrioti (5)
- 2015 : Kastrioti (6)
- 2016 : Prishtina (8)
- 2017 : Prishtina (9)
- 2018 : Istogu
- 2019 : Istogu (2)
- 2020 : Vushtrria (4)
- 2021 : Istogu (3)
- 2022 : Istogu (4)
- 2023 : Istogu (5)
- 2024 : Ferizaj
- 2025 : Istogu (6)
- 2026 : Samadrexha (2)

	Club	Titles	Year
1.	KHF Prishtina	9	1995, 1997, 2004, 2008, 2009, 2011, 2012, 2016, 2017
2.	KHF Kastrioti	6	1996, 2002, 2010, 2013, 2014, 2015
3.	KHF Istogu	6	2018, 2019, 2021, 2022, 2023, 2025
4.	KHF Vushtrria	4	2003, 2005, 2007, 2020
5.	KHF Samadrexha	2	2006, 2026
6.	KHF Vjosa	2	1994, 2001
7.	KHF Trepça	1	2000
8.	KHF Ferizaj	1	2025

== Woman Kosovar SuperCup winners ==
- 2022 : Istogu
- 2023 : Istogu (2)
- 2024 : Ferizaj
- 2025 : Istogu (3)
- 2026 : Samadrexha

	Club	Titles	Year
1.	KHF Istogu	3	2022, 2023, 2025
2.	KHF Ferizaj	1	2024
3.	KHF Samadrexha	1	2026
