= 2025 World Men's Handball Championship – European qualification =

The European qualification for the 2025 World Men's Handball Championship was contested in two rounds between November 2023 and May 2024. They joined the six already qualified teams: Croatia and Norway, as co-hosts, Denmark as co-host and title holder, France as defending runner-ups, and Sweden and Germany as the two best ranked teams at 2024 European Men's Handball Championship not already qualified.

== Format ==
In the first round of qualification, ten teams were drawn in to knock-out ties. The winners advanced to part one of the qualification phase 2, where they join Lithuania, Ukraine and Belgium. The advancing teams then joined the 18 teams participating at the 2024 European Men's Handball Championship for the final qualifiers.

== Qualification phase 1 ==
The draw took place on 5 July 2023. The winners of each tie advanced to phase 2.

=== Seeding ===
The 10 teams were seeded according to the current men's national team ranking.

Pot 1	Pot 2
Israel; Slovakia; Finland; Turkey; Estonia	Latvia; Italy; Kosovo; Luxembourg; Great Britain

=== Overview ===
Team 1	Agg.	Team 2	1st leg	2nd leg
Luxembourg	58–63	Israel	31–28	27–35
Great Britain	28–58	Finland	16–25	12–33
Latvia	51–58	Estonia	29–30	22–28
Slovakia	58–51	Kosovo	33–23	25–28
Turkey	64–65	Italy	37–28	27–37

==== Matches ====
All times are UTC+1.

17 January 2024 (Note: Due to the Gaza war, the matches of Israel were postponed.); 18:45	Luxembourg	31–28	Israel	d'Coque, Luxembourg City; Attendance: 457; Referees: Bolic, Hurich (AUT)
17 January 2024; 18:45	Hoffmann 10	(14–15)	Cohen 6	d'Coque, Luxembourg City; Attendance: 457; Referees: Bolic, Hurich (AUT)
17 January 2024; 18:45	2× (yellow card) 7× (suspension) 1× (red card)	Report	2× (suspension)	d'Coque, Luxembourg City; Attendance: 457; Referees: Bolic, Hurich (AUT)

18 January 2024; 18:45	Israel	35–27	Luxembourg	d'Coque, Luxembourg City, Luxembourg; Attendance: 442; Referees: Bolic, Hurich (AUT)
18 January 2024; 18:45	Dayan 9	(15–16)	Hoffmann 8	d'Coque, Luxembourg City, Luxembourg; Attendance: 442; Referees: Bolic, Hurich (AUT)
18 January 2024; 18:45	8× (suspension)	Report	4× (suspension)	d'Coque, Luxembourg City, Luxembourg; Attendance: 442; Referees: Bolic, Hurich (AUT)

Israel won 63–58 on aggregate.

2 November 2023; 20:00	Great Britain	16–25	Finland	Ravenscraig Regional Sports Facility, Motherwell; Attendance: 340; Referees: Pétursson, Þrastarson (ISL)
2 November 2023; 20:00	Pereira 7	(8–11)	Helander 9	Ravenscraig Regional Sports Facility, Motherwell; Attendance: 340; Referees: Pétursson, Þrastarson (ISL)
2 November 2023; 20:00	1× (yellow card) 2× (suspension)	Report	2× (yellow card) 4× (suspension)	Ravenscraig Regional Sports Facility, Motherwell; Attendance: 340; Referees: Pétursson, Þrastarson (ISL)

4 November 2023; 15:00	Finland	33–12	Great Britain	Karis idrottshall, Karis; Attendance: 650; Referees: Kull, Tint (EST)
4 November 2023; 15:00	Helander 10	(14–5)	Pereira 4	Karis idrottshall, Karis; Attendance: 650; Referees: Kull, Tint (EST)
4 November 2023; 15:00	3× (suspension)	Report	1× (yellow card) 2× (suspension)	Karis idrottshall, Karis; Attendance: 650; Referees: Kull, Tint (EST)

Finland won 58–28 on aggregate.

2 November 2023; 18:40	Latvia	29–30	Estonia	Valmiers Olympic Centre, Valmiera; Attendance: 450; Referees: Oyarzun, Zaragueta (ESP)
2 November 2023; 18:40	Geislers 12	(12–13)	Toom 7	Valmiers Olympic Centre, Valmiera; Attendance: 450; Referees: Oyarzun, Zaragueta (ESP)
2 November 2023; 18:40	1× (yellow card) 2× (suspension)	Report	2× (suspension)	Valmiers Olympic Centre, Valmiera; Attendance: 450; Referees: Oyarzun, Zaragueta (ESP)

4 November 2023; 18:00	Estonia	28–22	Latvia	Kalev Sports Hall, Tallinn; Attendance: 660; Referees: Fukala, Mohyla (CZE)
4 November 2023; 18:00	Varik 7	(12–7)	Geislers 5	Kalev Sports Hall, Tallinn; Attendance: 660; Referees: Fukala, Mohyla (CZE)
4 November 2023; 18:00	1× (yellow card) 6× (suspension)	Report	3× (suspension)	Kalev Sports Hall, Tallinn; Attendance: 660; Referees: Fukala, Mohyla (CZE)

Estonia won 58–51 on aggregate.

2 November 2023; 18:00	Slovakia	33–23	Kosovo	City Sports Hall Považská Bystrica, Považská Bystrica; Attendance: 1,400; Referees: Pagh, Thygesen (DEN)
2 November 2023; 18:00	Prokop 7	(15–9)	Gjuka, Ninaj 5	City Sports Hall Považská Bystrica, Považská Bystrica; Attendance: 1,400; Referees: Pagh, Thygesen (DEN)
2 November 2023; 18:00	2× (yellow card) 2× (suspension)	Report	1× (yellow card) 3× (suspension)	City Sports Hall Považská Bystrica, Považská Bystrica; Attendance: 1,400; Referees: Pagh, Thygesen (DEN)

5 November 2023; 17:00	Kosovo	28–25	Slovakia	Palace of Youth and Sports, Pristina; Attendance: 750; Referees: Cindrić, Gonzurek (CRO)
5 November 2023; 17:00	Dedaj, Ninaj 6	(14–14)	Briatka, Macháč 4	Palace of Youth and Sports, Pristina; Attendance: 750; Referees: Cindrić, Gonzurek (CRO)
5 November 2023; 17:00	2× (yellow card) 4× (suspension)	Report	2× (yellow card) 6× (suspension)	Palace of Youth and Sports, Pristina; Attendance: 750; Referees: Cindrić, Gonzurek (CRO)

Slovakia won 58–51 on aggregate.

1 November 2023; 17:00	Turkey	37–28	Italy	Sakarya Sports Hall, Serdivan; Attendance: 5,000; Referees: Ivanović, Vujisić (MNE)
1 November 2023; 17:00	Döne, Pehlivan 10	(15–13)	Parisini 7	Sakarya Sports Hall, Serdivan; Attendance: 5,000; Referees: Ivanović, Vujisić (MNE)
1 November 2023; 17:00	2× (yellow card) 6× (suspension)	Report	2× (suspension)	Sakarya Sports Hall, Serdivan; Attendance: 5,000; Referees: Ivanović, Vujisić (MNE)

5 November 2023; 18:00	Italy	37–27	Turkey	Pala Santa Filomena, Chieti; Attendance: 1,200; Referees: Thiyagarajah, Thiyagarajah (GER)
5 November 2023; 18:00	Mengon, Moretti 7	(16–11)	Pehlivan 7	Pala Santa Filomena, Chieti; Attendance: 1,200; Referees: Thiyagarajah, Thiyagarajah (GER)
5 November 2023; 18:00	3× (suspension)	Report	1× (yellow card) 6× (suspension)	Pala Santa Filomena, Chieti; Attendance: 1,200; Referees: Thiyagarajah, Thiyagarajah (GER)

Italy won 65–64 on aggregate.

== Qualification phase 2 ==
=== Part 1 ===
The winners of phase 1 joined Belgium, Lithuania and Ukraine. The matches were played in March 2024. The draw was made on 21 November 2023.

Qualified teams

- Ukraine
- Lithuania
- Belgium

from Phase 1

- Estonia
- Finland
- Israel
- Italy
- Slovakia

==== Seeding ====
The eight teams were seeded according to the current men's national team ranking.

Pot 1	Pot 2
Ukraine; Lithuania; Belgium; Israel	Slovakia; Finland; Estonia; Italy

==== Overview ====
Team 1	Agg.	Team 2	1st leg	2nd leg
Belgium	56–62	Italy	25–29	31–33
Estonia	73–62	Ukraine	32–29	41–33
Slovakia	52–49	Israel	26–25	26–24
Finland	46–46; 3–4 (p)	Lithuania	20–20	26–26

===== Matches =====
All times are UTC+1.

13 March 2024; 20:10	Belgium	25–29	Italy	Sporthal Alverberg, Hasselt; Attendance: 1,700; Referees: Cindrić, Gonzurek (CRO)
13 March 2024; 20:10	Danesi, Serras 5	(15–17)	Bulzamini 9	Sporthal Alverberg, Hasselt; Attendance: 1,700; Referees: Cindrić, Gonzurek (CRO)
13 March 2024; 20:10	2× (yellow card) 3× (suspension)	Report	1× (yellow card) 2× (suspension) 1× (red card)	Sporthal Alverberg, Hasselt; Attendance: 1,700; Referees: Cindrić, Gonzurek (CRO)

17 March 2024; 18:00	Italy	33–31	Belgium	Giovanni Paolo II Sports Hall, Pescara; Attendance: 1,200; Referees: Brkic, Jusufhodzic (AUT)
17 March 2024; 18:00	Bortoli 9	(16–16)	Danesi 6	Giovanni Paolo II Sports Hall, Pescara; Attendance: 1,200; Referees: Brkic, Jusufhodzic (AUT)
17 March 2024; 18:00	1× (yellow card) 2× (suspension)	Report	5× (suspension) 1× (red card)	Giovanni Paolo II Sports Hall, Pescara; Attendance: 1,200; Referees: Brkic, Jusufhodzic (AUT)

Italy won 62–56 on aggregate.

13 March 2024; 18:00	Estonia	32–29	Ukraine	Kalev Sports Hall, Tallinn; Attendance: 740; Referees: Hannes, Hannes (GER)
13 March 2024; 18:00	Jaanimaa 11	(18–16)	Turchenko 13	Kalev Sports Hall, Tallinn; Attendance: 740; Referees: Hannes, Hannes (GER)
13 March 2024; 18:00	2× (yellow card) 5× (suspension) 1× (red card)	Report	1× (yellow card) 4× (suspension)	Kalev Sports Hall, Tallinn; Attendance: 740; Referees: Hannes, Hannes (GER)

16 March 2024; 14:30	Ukraine	33–41	Estonia	Alytus Arena, Alytus, Lithuania (Note: Due to the Russian invasion of Ukraine, the Ukrainian team plays their home matches at neutral venues.); Attendance: 850; Referees: Čerņavskis, Bogdanovs (LAT)
16 March 2024; 14:30	Rahozin 6	(18–18)	Toom 9	Alytus Arena, Alytus, Lithuania; Attendance: 850; Referees: Čerņavskis, Bogdanovs (LAT)
16 March 2024; 14:30	3× (suspension)	Report	1× (suspension)	Alytus Arena, Alytus, Lithuania; Attendance: 850; Referees: Čerņavskis, Bogdanovs (LAT)

Estonia won 73–62 on aggregate.

15 March 2024; 19:30	Slovakia	26–25	Israel	Sporthalle Topoľčany, Topoľčany; Attendance: 2,100; Referees: Bozhinovski, Nachevski (MKD)
15 March 2024; 19:30	Potisk 6	(14–16)	Bodenheimer, Segal 5	Sporthalle Topoľčany, Topoľčany; Attendance: 2,100; Referees: Bozhinovski, Nachevski (MKD)
15 March 2024; 19:30	1× (yellow card) 1× (suspension)	Report	1× (suspension)	Sporthalle Topoľčany, Topoľčany; Attendance: 2,100; Referees: Bozhinovski, Nachevski (MKD)

17 March 2024; 14:00	Israel	24–26	Slovakia	Sporthalle Topoľčany, Topoľčany, Slovakia (Note: Due to the Gaza war, the Israeli team plays their home matches at neutral venues.); Attendance: 2,050; Referees: Bozhinovski, Nachevski (MKD)
17 March 2024; 14:00	Cohen 6	(11–13)	Potisk 6	Sporthalle Topoľčany, Topoľčany, Slovakia; Attendance: 2,050; Referees: Bozhinovski, Nachevski (MKD)
17 March 2024; 14:00	3× (suspension)	Report	3× (suspension)	Sporthalle Topoľčany, Topoľčany, Slovakia; Attendance: 2,050; Referees: Bozhinovski, Nachevski (MKD)

Slovakia won 52–49 on aggregate.

14 March 2024; 17:30	Finland	20–20	Lithuania	Energia Areena, Vantaa; Attendance: 900; Referees: Borge, Nygren (NOR)
14 March 2024; 17:30	M. Granlund, Helander 4	(9–9)	Antanavičius 5	Energia Areena, Vantaa; Attendance: 900; Referees: Borge, Nygren (NOR)
14 March 2024; 17:30	1× (yellow card) 7× (suspension)	Report	5× (suspension)	Energia Areena, Vantaa; Attendance: 900; Referees: Borge, Nygren (NOR)

17 March 2024
17:00
Lithuania
30–29
Finland
Alytus Arena, Alytus
Attendance: 1,700
Referees: Jerlecki,, Łabuń (POL)
Malašinskas 8
(13–13)
M. Granlund 6
4× (suspension)
Report
4× (suspension)

FT: 26–26 Pen: 4–3

46–46 on aggreagate. Lithuania won 4–3 on penalties.

=== Part 2 ===
The four winners from Part 1 joined the 18 teams from the 2024 European Men's Handball Championship final tournament that did not qualify directly for the 2025 World Championship. A draw held on 27 January 2024 paired seeded with unseeded teams into eleven two-legged fixtures, with the first leg played on 8 and 9 May and the second leg played on 11 and 12 May 2024. The winners qualified for the 2025 World Men's Handball Championship final tournament.

==== Seeding ====
The 22 teams were seeded according to the ranking of the 2024 European Men's Handball Championship. The 11 best-ranked teams were placed in Pot 1, while the remaining seven teams were placed together with the four winners from Part 1 in Pot 2.

Pot 1	Pot 2
Hungary; Slovenia; Portugal; Austria; Iceland; Netherlands; Spain; Montenegro; Czech Republic; Poland; North Macedonia	Georgia; Serbia; Faroe Islands; Switzerland; Romania; Greece; Bosnia and Herzegovina; Italy (Note: Team not determined at time of draw.); Estonia; Slovakia; Lithuania

==== Overview ====
Team 1	Agg.	Team 2	1st leg	2nd leg
Lithuania	49–69	Hungary	26–33	23–36
Slovenia	60–60; 4–1 (p)	Switzerland	26–27	34–33
Portugal	55–45	Bosnia and Herzegovina	29–19	26–26
Georgia	56–64	Austria	25–27	31–37
Iceland	87–49	Estonia	50–25	37–24
Greece	56–58	Netherlands	31–27	25–31
Spain	54–53	Serbia	32–28	22–25
Italy	66–58	Montenegro	32–26	34–32
Romania	51–59	Czech Republic	31–30	20–29
Poland	61–54	Slovakia	28–29	33–25
Faroe Islands	60–61	North Macedonia	34–27	26–34

===== Matches =====
All times are UTC+2.

9 May 2024; 18:00	Lithuania	26–33	Hungary	Avia Solutions Group Arena, Vilnius; Attendance: 1,901; Referees: Lovin, Stancu (ROU)
9 May 2024; 18:00	Antanavičius 6	(11–13)	Imre 11	Avia Solutions Group Arena, Vilnius; Attendance: 1,901; Referees: Lovin, Stancu (ROU)
9 May 2024; 18:00	1× (yellow card) 4× (suspension)	Report	2× (yellow card) 3× (suspension)	Avia Solutions Group Arena, Vilnius; Attendance: 1,901; Referees: Lovin, Stancu (ROU)

12 May 2024; 17:15	Hungary	36–23	Lithuania	Veszprém Aréna, Veszprém; Attendance: 3,763; Referees: Lončar, Lončar (CRO)
12 May 2024; 17:15	Rosta 6	(17–10)	Dumčius 8	Veszprém Aréna, Veszprém; Attendance: 3,763; Referees: Lončar, Lončar (CRO)
12 May 2024; 17:15	3× (suspension)	Report	3× (suspension)	Veszprém Aréna, Veszprém; Attendance: 3,763; Referees: Lončar, Lončar (CRO)

Hungary won 69–49 on aggregate.

9 May 2024; 18:00	Slovenia	26–27	Switzerland	Arena Bonifika, Koper; Attendance: 2,200; Referees: Madsen, Mortensen (DEN)
9 May 2024; 18:00	Vlah 5	(15–12)	M. Zehnder 8	Arena Bonifika, Koper; Attendance: 2,200; Referees: Madsen, Mortensen (DEN)
9 May 2024; 18:00	2× (yellow card) 3× (suspension)	Report	3× (suspension)	Arena Bonifika, Koper; Attendance: 2,200; Referees: Madsen, Mortensen (DEN)

12 May 2024
16:00
Switzerland
34–38
Slovenia
AXA-Arena, Winterthur
Attendance: 1,920
Referees: Covalciuc, Covalciuc (MDA)
M. Zehnder 7
(12–14)
Bombač 11
2× (suspension)
Report
1× (yellow card) 5× (suspension)

FT: 33–34 Pen: 1–4

60–60 on aggregate. Slovenia won 4–1 on penalties.

9 May 2024; 20:30	Portugal	29–19	Bosnia and Herzegovina	Pavilhao Desportivo Unidade Vimaranense, Guimarães; Referees: Kull, Tint (EST)
9 May 2024; 20:30	Portela 6	(14–10)	Vukšic 7	Pavilhao Desportivo Unidade Vimaranense, Guimarães; Referees: Kull, Tint (EST)
9 May 2024; 20:30	2× (suspension)	Report	1× (yellow card) 5× (suspension)	Pavilhao Desportivo Unidade Vimaranense, Guimarães; Referees: Kull, Tint (EST)

12 May 2024; 17:00	Bosnia and Herzegovina	26–26	Portugal	KSPC Mejdan, Tuzla; Attendance: 3,100; Referees: Backović, Palačković (SLO)
12 May 2024; 17:00	Herceg 7	(13–17)	Branquinho 4	KSPC Mejdan, Tuzla; Attendance: 3,100; Referees: Backović, Palačković (SLO)
12 May 2024; 17:00	1× (yellow card) 3× (suspension)	Report	2× (yellow card) 2× (suspension)	KSPC Mejdan, Tuzla; Attendance: 3,100; Referees: Backović, Palačković (SLO)

Portugal won 55–45 on aggregate.

9 May 2024; 16:00	Georgia	25–27	Austria	Tbilisi Sports Palace, Tbilisi; Attendance: 3,000; Referees: Mažeika, Gatelis (LTU)
9 May 2024; 16:00	Tskhovrebadze 8	(12–12)	Frimmel 8	Tbilisi Sports Palace, Tbilisi; Attendance: 3,000; Referees: Mažeika, Gatelis (LTU)
9 May 2024; 16:00	1× (yellow card) 2× (suspension)	Report	1× (yellow card) 5× (suspension)	Tbilisi Sports Palace, Tbilisi; Attendance: 3,000; Referees: Mažeika, Gatelis (LTU)

12 May 2024; 16:00	Austria	37–31	Georgia	Albert Schultz Halle, Vienna; Attendance: 4,099; Referees: Álvarez, Bustamante (ESP)
12 May 2024; 16:00	Frimmel 7	(21–17)	Tskhovrebadze 10	Albert Schultz Halle, Vienna; Attendance: 4,099; Referees: Álvarez, Bustamante (ESP)
12 May 2024; 16:00	1× (suspension)	Report	1× (yellow card) 1× (suspension)	Albert Schultz Halle, Vienna; Attendance: 4,099; Referees: Álvarez, Bustamante (ESP)

Austria won 64–56 on aggregate.

8 May 2024; 21:30	Iceland	50–25	Estonia	Laugardalshöll, Reykjavík; Attendance: 2,500; Referees: Mandák, Rudinský (SVK)
8 May 2024; 21:30	Magnússon 12	(26–12)	Jaanimaa 8	Laugardalshöll, Reykjavík; Attendance: 2,500; Referees: Mandák, Rudinský (SVK)
8 May 2024; 21:30	2× (suspension)	Report	3× (suspension)	Laugardalshöll, Reykjavík; Attendance: 2,500; Referees: Mandák, Rudinský (SVK)

11 May 2024; 17:00	Estonia	24–37	Iceland	Kalev Sports Hall, Tallinn; Attendance: 600; Referees: Vujačić, Kažanegra (MNE)
11 May 2024; 17:00	Koks, Toom 5	(13–18)	Þorkelsson 9	Kalev Sports Hall, Tallinn; Attendance: 600; Referees: Vujačić, Kažanegra (MNE)
11 May 2024; 17:00	1× (yellow card) 2× (suspension)	Report	1× (yellow card) 2× (suspension) 1× (red card)	Kalev Sports Hall, Tallinn; Attendance: 600; Referees: Vujačić, Kažanegra (MNE)

Iceland won 87–49 on aggregate.

8 May 2024; 16:15	Greece	31–27	Netherlands	Municipal Sports Center Lefkovrisi, Kozani; Attendance: 2,000; Referees: Gasmi, Gasmi (FRA)
8 May 2024; 16:15	Toskas 7	(13–12)	Ten Velde 10	Municipal Sports Center Lefkovrisi, Kozani; Attendance: 2,000; Referees: Gasmi, Gasmi (FRA)
8 May 2024; 16:15	1× (yellow card) 6× (suspension)	Report	4× (suspension)	Municipal Sports Center Lefkovrisi, Kozani; Attendance: 2,000; Referees: Gasmi, Gasmi (FRA)

12 May 2024; 16:00	Netherlands	31–25	Greece	Indoor-Sportcentrum Eindhoven, Eindhoven; Attendance: 2,100; Referees: Horáček, Novotný (CZE)
12 May 2024; 16:00	Ten Velde 7	(16–10)	Liapis 8	Indoor-Sportcentrum Eindhoven, Eindhoven; Attendance: 2,100; Referees: Horáček, Novotný (CZE)
12 May 2024; 16:00	4× (suspension)	Report	2× (yellow card) 2× (suspension) 1× (red card)	Indoor-Sportcentrum Eindhoven, Eindhoven; Attendance: 2,100; Referees: Horáček, Novotný (CZE)

Netherlands won 58–56 on aggregate.

8 May 2024; 21:00	Spain	32–28	Serbia	Lalín Arena, Lalín; Attendance: 2,480; Referees: Hansen, Madsen (DEN)
8 May 2024; 21:00	A. Dujshebaev 6	(15–14)	Jovanović 6	Lalín Arena, Lalín; Attendance: 2,480; Referees: Hansen, Madsen (DEN)
8 May 2024; 21:00	4× (suspension)	Report	1× (yellow card) 3× (suspension)	Lalín Arena, Lalín; Attendance: 2,480; Referees: Hansen, Madsen (DEN)

12 May 2024; 17:00	Serbia	25–22	Spain	Spens, Novi Sad; Attendance: 5,500; Referees: Lah, Sok (SLO)
12 May 2024; 17:00	Ilić 6	(15–11)	Gómez 5	Spens, Novi Sad; Attendance: 5,500; Referees: Lah, Sok (SLO)
12 May 2024; 17:00	1× (yellow card) 5× (suspension)	Report	4× (suspension)	Spens, Novi Sad; Attendance: 5,500; Referees: Lah, Sok (SLO)

Spain won 54–53 on aggregate.

9 May 2024; 20:00	Italy	32–26	Montenegro	Pala San Giacomo, Conversano; Attendance: 3,900; Referees: Brunner, Salah (SUI)
9 May 2024; 20:00	Bronzo 13	(16–15)	Kaluđerović 6	Pala San Giacomo, Conversano; Attendance: 3,900; Referees: Brunner, Salah (SUI)
9 May 2024; 20:00	3× (suspension)	Report	3× (suspension)	Pala San Giacomo, Conversano; Attendance: 3,900; Referees: Brunner, Salah (SUI)

12 May 2024; 17:30	Montenegro	32–34	Italy	Morača Sports Center, Podgorica; Attendance: 5,000; Referees: Martins, Martins (POR)
12 May 2024; 17:30	Radović 6	(13–17)	Bronzo, S. Mengon 8	Morača Sports Center, Podgorica; Attendance: 5,000; Referees: Martins, Martins (POR)
12 May 2024; 17:30	2× (suspension) 1× (red card)	Report	3× (suspension)	Morača Sports Center, Podgorica; Attendance: 5,000; Referees: Martins, Martins (POR)

Italy won 66–58 on aggregate.

8 May 2024; 16:30	Romania	31–30	Czech Republic	Lascăr Pană Sports Hall, Baia Mare; Attendance: 2,218; Referees: Marín, García (ESP)
8 May 2024; 16:30	Grigoraș 9	(15–11)	Piroch 9	Lascăr Pană Sports Hall, Baia Mare; Attendance: 2,218; Referees: Marín, García (ESP)
8 May 2024; 16:30	2× (yellow card) 4× (suspension)	Report	1× (yellow card) 3× (suspension)	Lascăr Pană Sports Hall, Baia Mare; Attendance: 2,218; Referees: Marín, García (ESP)

12 May 2024; 16:30	Czech Republic	29–20	Romania	Winning Group Arena, Brno; Attendance: 3,852; Referees: Schulze, Tönnies (GER)
12 May 2024; 16:30	Klíma 9	(15–9)	Drăgan 5	Winning Group Arena, Brno; Attendance: 3,852; Referees: Schulze, Tönnies (GER)
12 May 2024; 16:30	1× (yellow card) 5× (suspension)	Report	2× (suspension)	Winning Group Arena, Brno; Attendance: 3,852; Referees: Schulze, Tönnies (GER)

Czech Republic won 59–51 on aggregate.

9 May 2024; 18:00	Poland	28–29	Slovakia	Ergo Arena, Gdańsk; Attendance: 7,000; Referees: Caçador, Nicolau (POR)
9 May 2024; 18:00	Syprzak 11	(15–16)	Briatka 11	Ergo Arena, Gdańsk; Attendance: 7,000; Referees: Caçador, Nicolau (POR)
9 May 2024; 18:00	5× (suspension)	Report	1× (yellow card) 6× (suspension)	Ergo Arena, Gdańsk; Attendance: 7,000; Referees: Caçador, Nicolau (POR)

12 May 2024; 17:30	Slovakia	25–33	Poland	Sporthalle Topoľčany, Topoľčany; Attendance: 2,050; Referees: Konjičanin, Konjičanin (BIH)
12 May 2024; 17:30	Smetánka 6	(12–15)	Syprzak 10	Sporthalle Topoľčany, Topoľčany; Attendance: 2,050; Referees: Konjičanin, Konjičanin (BIH)
12 May 2024; 17:30	1× (yellow card) 3× (suspension) 1× (red card)	Report	1× (yellow card) 2× (suspension)	Sporthalle Topoľčany, Topoľčany; Attendance: 2,050; Referees: Konjičanin, Konjičanin (BIH)

Poland won 61–54 on aggregate.

8 May 2024; 20:00	Faroe Islands	34–27	North Macedonia	Høllin á Hálsi, Tórshavn; Attendance: 1,632; Referees: Merz, Kuttler (GER)
8 May 2024; 20:00	Ellefsen á Skipagøtu 10	(18–14)	Kuzmanovski 8	Høllin á Hálsi, Tórshavn; Attendance: 1,632; Referees: Merz, Kuttler (GER)
8 May 2024; 20:00	1× (yellow card) 2× (suspension)	Report	1× (yellow card) 8× (suspension) 1× (red card)	Høllin á Hálsi, Tórshavn; Attendance: 1,632; Referees: Merz, Kuttler (GER)

12 May 2024; 19:00	North Macedonia	34–26	Faroe Islands	Boris Trajkovski Sports Center, Skopje; Attendance: 6,800; Referees: Erdoğan, Özdeniz (TUR)
12 May 2024; 19:00	Peševski 8	(19–15)	Ellefsen á Skipagøtu 8	Boris Trajkovski Sports Center, Skopje; Attendance: 6,800; Referees: Erdoğan, Özdeniz (TUR)
12 May 2024; 19:00	1× (yellow card) 3× (suspension)	Report	2× (suspension)	Boris Trajkovski Sports Center, Skopje; Attendance: 6,800; Referees: Erdoğan, Özdeniz (TUR)

North Macedonia won 61–60 on aggregate.
