= 2021 Men's IHF/EHF Trophy =

Tournament details
- Host country: Georgia
- Venue(s): 1 (in 1 host city)
- Dates: 14–19 June
- Teams: 6 (from 1 confederation)

Final positions
- Champions: Georgia (1st title)
- Runners-up: Cyprus
- Third place: Bulgaria
- Fourth place: Moldova

Tournament statistics
- Matches played: 10
- Goals scored: 518 (51.8 per match)
- Top scorer(s): (Georgia (country)) Giorgi Tskhovrebadze (Moldova) Roman Zacaciurin (36 goals)

Awards
- Best player: (Georgia (country)) Irakli Kbilashvili

The 2021 Men's IHF/EHF Trophy took place in Tbilisi, Georgia from 14 to 19 June 2021 and was a replacement for the cancelled 2021 IHF Emerging Nations Championship. After the 2021 IHF Emerging Nations Championship was cancelled, the EHF announced in March 2021 that the IHF/EHF Trophy would be held. The three best teams qualified for the relegation round of the 2024 European Men's Handball Championship qualification.

Georgia defeated Cyprus in the final to win the tournament.

== Preliminary round ==
All times are local (UTC+4).

=== Group A ===
Pos	Team	Pld	W	D	L	GF	GA	GD	Pts	Qualification
1	Cyprus	2	2	0	0	67	39	+28	4	Semifinals
2	Bulgaria	2	1	0	1	61	50	+11	2	Semifinals
3	Andorra	2	0	0	2	37	76	−39	0	Fifth place game

Source: EHF
Rules for classification: 1) points; 2) head-to-head points; 3) head-to-head goal difference; 4) head-to-head number of goals scored; 5) goal difference.

14 June 2021; 16:30	Cyprus	29–23	Bulgaria	Tbilisi Sports Palace, Tbilisi; Attendance: 0 (Note: The match was played behind closed doors due to the COVID-19 pandemic.); Referees: Ershov, Pavliukov (RUS)
14 June 2021; 16:30	Paraskeva 7	(12–9)	Vasilev 6	Tbilisi Sports Palace, Tbilisi; Attendance: 0 Referees: Ershov, Pavliukov (RUS)
14 June 2021; 16:30	2× (yellow card) 5× (suspension)	Report	2× (yellow card) 6× (suspension)	Tbilisi Sports Palace, Tbilisi; Attendance: 0 Referees: Ershov, Pavliukov (RUS)

15 June 2021; 16:30	Andorra	16–38	Cyprus	Tbilisi Sports Palace, Tbilisi; Attendance: 0 Referees: Rauchs, Linster (LUX)
15 June 2021; 16:30	Soto 4	(10–20)	C. Argyrou 10	Tbilisi Sports Palace, Tbilisi; Attendance: 0 Referees: Rauchs, Linster (LUX)
15 June 2021; 16:30	1× (yellow card) 3× (suspension)	Report	1× (yellow card) 4× (suspension)	Tbilisi Sports Palace, Tbilisi; Attendance: 0 Referees: Rauchs, Linster (LUX)

16 June 2021; 16:30	Bulgaria	38–21	Andorra	Tbilisi Sports Palace, Tbilisi; Attendance: 0 Referees: Mitrović, Kažanegra (MNE)
16 June 2021; 16:30	Vasilev 9	(16–8)	Ruiz 7	Tbilisi Sports Palace, Tbilisi; Attendance: 0 Referees: Mitrović, Kažanegra (MNE)
16 June 2021; 16:30	1× (yellow card) 5× (suspension)	Report	1× (yellow card) 2× (suspension)	Tbilisi Sports Palace, Tbilisi; Attendance: 0 Referees: Mitrović, Kažanegra (MNE)

=== Group B ===
Pos	Team	Pld	W	D	L	GF	GA	GD	Pts	Qualification
1	Georgia (H)	2	2	0	0	63	36	+27	4	Semifinals
2	Moldova	2	1	0	1	48	43	+5	2	Semifinals
3	Azerbaijan	2	0	0	2	32	64	−32	0	Fifth place game

Source: EHF
Rules for classification: 1) points; 2) head-to-head points; 3) head-to-head goal difference; 4) head-to-head number of goals scored; 5) goal difference.
(H) Hosts

14 June 2021; 19:00	Georgia	36–16	Azerbaijan	Tbilisi Sports Palace, Tbilisi; Attendance: 0 Referees: Braseth, Sundet (NOR)
14 June 2021; 19:00	Kbilashvili 12	(18–7)	Aydamirov 6	Tbilisi Sports Palace, Tbilisi; Attendance: 0 Referees: Braseth, Sundet (NOR)
14 June 2021; 19:00	1× (yellow card) 4× (suspension) 1× (red card)	Report	1× (yellow card) 5× (suspension)	Tbilisi Sports Palace, Tbilisi; Attendance: 0 Referees: Braseth, Sundet (NOR)

15 June 2021; 19:00	Moldova	20–27	Georgia	Tbilisi Sports Palace, Tbilisi; Attendance: 0 Referees: Mitrović, Kažanegra (MNE)
15 June 2021; 19:00	Zacaciurin 10	(10–11)	Tskhovrebadze 10	Tbilisi Sports Palace, Tbilisi; Attendance: 0 Referees: Mitrović, Kažanegra (MNE)
15 June 2021; 19:00	1× (yellow card) 3× (suspension) 1× (red card)	Report	4× (suspension)	Tbilisi Sports Palace, Tbilisi; Attendance: 0 Referees: Mitrović, Kažanegra (MNE)

16 June 2021; 19:00	Azerbaijan	16–28	Moldova	Tbilisi Sports Palace, Tbilisi; Attendance: 0 Referees: Rauchs, Linster (LUX)
16 June 2021; 19:00	Dubovyk 5	(7–13)	Savcenco 6	Tbilisi Sports Palace, Tbilisi; Attendance: 0 Referees: Rauchs, Linster (LUX)
16 June 2021; 19:00	5× (suspension)	Report	2× (yellow card) 4× (suspension)	Tbilisi Sports Palace, Tbilisi; Attendance: 0 Referees: Rauchs, Linster (LUX)

== Knockout stage ==
=== Bracket ===
Semi-finals
18 June
Cyprus	30
Moldova	28
18 June
Georgia	32
Bulgaria	19

Final
19 June
Cyprus	18
Georgia	32
Third place
19 June
Moldova	25
Bulgaria	26

=== Semifinals ===
18 June 2021; 16:30	Cyprus	30–28	Moldova	Tbilisi Sports Palace, Tbilisi; Attendance: 0 Referees: Braseth, Sundet (NOR)
18 June 2021; 16:30	C. Argyrou 8	(14–11)	Zacaciurin 13	Tbilisi Sports Palace, Tbilisi; Attendance: 0 Referees: Braseth, Sundet (NOR)
18 June 2021; 16:30	1× (yellow card) 6× (suspension)	Report	1× (yellow card) 3× (suspension)	Tbilisi Sports Palace, Tbilisi; Attendance: 0 Referees: Braseth, Sundet (NOR)

18 June 2021; 19:00	Georgia	32–19	Bulgaria	Tbilisi Sports Palace, Tbilisi; Attendance: 0 Referees: Rauchs, Linster (LUX)
18 June 2021; 19:00	Tskhovrebadze 8	(22–11)	Neychev 5	Tbilisi Sports Palace, Tbilisi; Attendance: 0 Referees: Rauchs, Linster (LUX)
18 June 2021; 19:00	1× (yellow card) 7× (suspension)	Report	1× (suspension)	Tbilisi Sports Palace, Tbilisi; Attendance: 0 Referees: Rauchs, Linster (LUX)

=== Fifth place game ===
Cancelled (Note: The matches, originally scheduled for 18 and 19 June, were cancelled due to several positive COVID-19 tests by the Andorran team.)	Azerbaijan	Cancelled	Andorra

Cancelled	Andorra	Cancelled	Azerbaijan

=== Third place game ===
19 June 2021; 16:30	Moldova	25–26	Bulgaria	Tbilisi Sports Palace, Tbilisi; Attendance: 0 Referees: Mitrović, Kažanegra (MNE)
19 June 2021; 16:30	Zacaciurin 9	(11–13)	Dimitrov 9	Tbilisi Sports Palace, Tbilisi; Attendance: 0 Referees: Mitrović, Kažanegra (MNE)
19 June 2021; 16:30	1× (yellow card) 2× (suspension)	Report	1× (yellow card) 3× (suspension)	Tbilisi Sports Palace, Tbilisi; Attendance: 0 Referees: Mitrović, Kažanegra (MNE)

=== Final ===
19 June 2021; 19:00	Cyprus	18–32	Georgia	Tbilisi Sports Palace, Tbilisi; Attendance: 0 Referees: Ershov, Pavliukov (RUS)
19 June 2021; 19:00	Argyrou 5	(6–14)	Tskhovrebadze 12	Tbilisi Sports Palace, Tbilisi; Attendance: 0 Referees: Ershov, Pavliukov (RUS)
19 June 2021; 19:00	2× (suspension)	Report	6× (suspension)	Tbilisi Sports Palace, Tbilisi; Attendance: 0 Referees: Ershov, Pavliukov (RUS)

== Final standings ==
Rank	Team
1st place, gold medalist(s)	Georgia
2nd place, silver medalist(s)	Cyprus
3rd place, bronze medalist(s)	Bulgaria
4	Moldova
5	Andorra; Azerbaijan

Team advanced to the Relegation Round of qualification for EURO 2024

== All-Star team ==
The all-star team was announced on 19 June 2021.

Position	Player
Goalkeeper	(Georgia (country)) Zurab Tsintsadze
Right wing	(Bulgaria) Svetelin Dimitrov
Right back	(Georgia (country)) Giorgi Tskhovrebadze
Centre back	(Georgia (country)) Irakli Kbilashvili
Left back	(Cyprus) Loucas Paraskeva
Left wing	(Cyprus) Christos Argyrou
Pivot	(Georgia (country)) Erekle Arsenashvili
MVP	(Georgia (country)) Irakli Kbilashvili
