= 2024 European Men's Handball Championship =

2024 edition of the European Men's Handball Championship

2024 EHF European Men's Handball Championship
Handball-Europameisterschaft der Männer 2024 (in German)

Tournament details
- Host country: Germany
- Venues: 6 (in 6 host cities)
- Dates: 10–28 January
- Teams: 24 (from 1 confederation)

Final positions
- Champions: France (4th title)
- Runners-up: Denmark
- Third place: Sweden
- Fourth place: Germany

Tournament statistics
- Matches played: 65
- Goals scored: 3,778 (58.12 per match)
- Attendance: 1,008,660 (15,518 per match)
- Top scorers: (Portugal) Martim Costa (Denmark) Mathias Gidsel (54 goals each)

Awards
- Best player: (France) Nedim Remili

The 2024 EHF European Men's Handball Championship was the 16th edition of the tournament and the third to feature 24 national teams. It was hosted in Germany from 10 to 28 January 2024.

The two opening games of the tournament were attended by 53,586 spectators, setting a world record for the largest audience at a handball event. Additionally, the tournament achieved a record for the highest total number of spectators in handball history, becoming the first to exceed one million attendees.

France won their first title in a decade after defeating Denmark in the final. Defending champions Sweden captured the bronze medal after defeating hosts Germany.

== Bid process ==
=== Bids ===
On 4 May 2017, it was announced that the following countries had sent in an official expression of interest:

- Czech Republic, Hungary & Slovakia
- Denmark & Switzerland
- Germany
- North Macedonia (potentially with Slovenia)
- Lithuania

However, when the deadline for submitting the final bids expired, the following applications had been received:

- Denmark & Switzerland
- Hungary & Slovakia (withdrew after receiving the 2022 hosting rights)
- Germany

=== Host selection ===
On 20 June 2018 at the 14th ordinary EHF Congress held in Glasgow, Germany was selected to host the competition.

Voting results
Country
Country	Votes
Germany	27
Denmark & Switzerland	19
Hungary & Slovakia	-
Total	46

== Venues ==
On 10 June 2021, the host cities were announced where the championship will be played in six cities. The opening game will be held in Merkur Spiel-Arena in Düsseldorf and is aiming to break the world record for the largest attendance at an indoor handball game (Note: The record in field handball is 100,000 people. It was established at the last game of the 1936 Summer Olympics.) and the final will be held in Lanxess Arena in Cologne. On 14 September 2022, it was announced that the classic venue Olympiahalle in Munich (previously hosted Handball at the 1972 Summer Olympics main round and medal games and also the group stage games in the 2019 World Men's Handball Championship) would replace the delay-ridden SAP Garden. Due to material and labour shortages, the venue would not be completed in time for the tournament in January 2024, therefore being dropped by the organisers. Both Olympiahalle and the future SAP Garden are located close to each other in the Olympiapark.

Düsseldorf	Cologne	Berlin
Merkur Spiel-Arena	Lanxess Arena	Mercedes-Benz Arena
Capacity: 54,600	Capacity: 19,750	Capacity: 14,800
2024 European Men's Handball Championship is located in Germany
Hamburg	Mannheim	Munich
Barclays Arena	SAP Arena	Olympiahalle
Capacity: 13 300	Capacity: 13,200	Capacity: 12,150

== Qualification ==
The qualification for the final tournament has taken place between November 2021 and April 2023. Germany as the host team, and the three best placed not already qualified teams from the previous championship, were automatically qualified, leaving a total of 36 national teams to compete for the remaining 20 places in the final tournament.

The competition consists of two rounds: a relegation round and qualifiers. In the relegation round, the three best placed teams from the 2021 Men's IHF/EHF Trophy joined by Luxembourg as best ranked team according EHF which haven't participated in the second round of the previous qualifiers, faced the four worst ranked fourth-placed teams from the second round of the 2022 qualification. The four winners of the two-legged relegation round matches advance to the qualifiers, joining the remaining twenty teams that participated in the 2022 championship and the remaining eight teams that were eliminated in the second round of the 2022 qualification. Those 32 teams will be divided into eight groups by four teams, with top two teams and four best ranked third-teams qualifying.

=== Qualified teams ===
Country	Qualified as	Qualified on	Previous appearances in tournament
Germany	Host	20 June 2018	14 (1994, 1996, 1998, 2000, 2002, **2004**, 2006, 2008, 2010, 2012, **2016**, 2018, 2020, 2022)
Spain	Top three at 2022 European Championship	28 January 2022	15 (1994, 1996, 1998, 2000, 2002, 2004, 2006, 2008, 2010, 2012, 2014, 2016, **2018**, **2020**, 2022)
Sweden	Top three at 2022 European Championship	28 January 2022	14 (**1994**, 1996, **1998**, **2000**, **2002**, 2004, 2008, 2010, 2012, 2014, 2016, 2018, 2020, **2022**)
Denmark	Top three at 2022 European Championship	30 January 2022	14 (1994, 1996, 2000, 2002, 2004, 2006, **2008**, 2010, **2012**, 2014, 2016, 2018, 2020, 2022)
Austria	Group 4 top-two	11 March 2023	5 (2010, 2014, 2018, 2020, 2022)
France	Group 8 top-two	11 March 2023	15 (1994, 1996, 1998, 2000, 2002, 2004, **2006**, 2008, **2010**, 2012, **2014**, 2016, 2018, 2020, 2022)
Hungary	Group 6 top-two	12 March 2023	13 (1994, 1996, 1998, 2004, 2006, 2008, 2010, 2012, 2014, 2016, 2018, 2020, 2022)
Portugal	Group 1 top-two	12 March 2023	7 (1994, 2000, 2002, 2004, 2006, 2020, 2022)
Slovenia	Group 7 top-two	12 March 2023	13 (1994, 1996, 2000, 2002, 2004, 2006, 2008, 2010, 2012, 2016, 2018, 2020, 2022)
Croatia	Group 5 top-two	26 April 2023	15 (1994, 1996, 1998, 2000, 2002, 2004, 2006, 2008, 2010, 2012, 2014, 2016, 2018, 2020, 2022)
Norway	Group 2 top-two	26 April 2023	10 (2000, 2006, 2008, 2010, 2012, 2014, 2016, 2018, 2020, 2022)
Serbia	Group 2 top-two	26 April 2023	7 (2010, 2012, 2014, 2016, 2018, 2020, 2022)
Iceland	Group 3 top-two	27 April 2023	12 (2000, 2002, 2004, 2006, 2008, 2010, 2012, 2014, 2016, 2018, 2020, 2022)
Czech Republic	Group 3 top-two	27 April 2023	11 (1996, 1998, 2002, 2004, 2008, 2010, 2012, 2014, 2018, 2020, 2022)
Switzerland	Group 6 top-two	27 April 2023	4 (2002, 2004, 2006, 2020)
Poland	Group 8 top-two	27 April 2023	10 (2002, 2004, 2006, 2008, 2010, 2012, 2014, 2016, 2020, 2022)
North Macedonia	Group 1 top-two	30 April 2023	7 (1998, 2012, 2014, 2016, 2018, 2020, 2022)
Romania	Group 4 top-two	30 April 2023	2 (1994, 1996)
Netherlands	Group 5 top-two	30 April 2023	2 (2020, 2022)
Bosnia and Herzegovina	Group 7 top-two	30 April 2023	2 (2020, 2022)
Montenegro	One of four-best third-ranked teams	30 April 2023	6 (2008, 2014, 2016, 2018, 2020, 2022)
Faroe Islands	One of four-best third-ranked teams	30 April 2023	0 (debut)
Greece	One of four-best third-ranked teams	30 April 2023	0 (debut)
Georgia	One of four-best third-ranked teams	30 April 2023	0 (debut)

Note: Bold indicates champion for that year. Italic indicates host for that year.

== Marketing ==
The official logo and slogan was unveiled on 6 January 2022. The basis for the logo design is the place where everything is decided in handball and where emotions arise: the lines of the court. Those were transformed into the compact shape of a ball that conveys the dynamics of the sport. The logo was designed by and in collaboration with Berlin-based agency Styleheads. The heart of the communication is the claim "HERE TO PLAY!" This is activated in several variants in order to convey the different facets of the Men's EHF EURO 2024 and the individual locations. The following variations of the claim were used:

- HERE TO PLAY
- HERE TO DREAM
- HERE TO BE LOUD
- HERE TO CELEBRATE
- HERE TO RELAX
- HERE TO CONNECT
- HERE TO ENJOY
- HERE TO WATCH
- HERE TO EXPLORE.

== Draw ==
The draw took place on 10 May 2023 in Düsseldorf, Germany.

=== Seeding ===
The seedings were announced on 1 May 2023.

Pot 1	Pot 2	Pot 3	Pot 4
Sweden (assigned to E1); Spain; Denmark (assigned to F1); France; Norway (assigned to D1); Iceland (assigned to C1)	Germany (assigned to A2); Netherlands; Hungary; Slovenia; Portugal; Austria	Croatia (assigned to B3); Poland; Czech Republic; Serbia; North Macedonia; Bosnia and Herzegovina	Montenegro; Faroe Islands; Greece; Georgia; Romania; Switzerland

== Referees ==
The 18 referee pairs were selected on 25 September 2023.

Referees
Bosnia and Herzegovina	Amar Konjičanin; Dino Konjičanin
Czech Republic	Václav Horáček; Jiří Novotný
Denmark	Mads Hansen; Jesper Madsen
France	Charlotte Bonaventura; Julie Bonaventura
France	Karim Gasmi; Raouf Gasmi
Germany	Maike Merz; Tanja Kuttler
Germany	Robert Schulze; Tobias Tönnies
Iceland	Jónas Elíasson; Anton Pálsson
Lithuania	Vaidas Mažeika; Mindaugas Gatelis

Referees
Moldova	Igor Covalciuc; Alexei Covalciuc
Montenegro	Ivan Pavićević; Miloš Ražnatović
North Macedonia	Slave Nikolov; Gjorgji Nachevski
Norway	Lars Jørum; Håvard Kleven
Portugal	Daniel Martins; Roberto Martins
Slovenia	Bojan Lah; David Sok
Spain	Andreu Marín; Ignacio García
Switzerland	Arthur Brunner; Morad Salah
Sweden	Mirza Kurtagic; Mattias Wetterwik

== Squads ==
Each team consists of up to 20 players, of whom 16 may be fielded for each match.

== Tiebreakers ==
In the preliminary and main rounds, if two or more teams are equal on points, their ranking is determined as follows:

During the round matches

1. Superior goal difference from all group matches;
2. Higher number of goals scored in all group matches;
3. Alphabetical order.

After completion of the round matches

1. Higher number of points obtained in the group matches played between the teams in question;
2. Superior goal difference from the group matches played between the teams in question;
3. Higher number of goals scored in the group matches played between the teams in question;
4. Superior goal difference from all group matches;
5. Higher number of goals scored in all group matches.

If the ranking of one of the teams in question is determined, the criteria are consecutively reapplied to the remaining teams until all the rankings are determined. If this procedure does not lead to a decision, the Fair Play Ranking decides about the final group ranking. The Fair Play Ranking is decided by the EHF in accordance with the parameters rated as follows:

- Yellow cards: 1 point
- Two-minute suspensions: 2 points
- Red cards: 8 points

In case the number of points in the Fair Play Ranking are identical, a draw is carried out by the EHF in the presence of at least one official from each of the concerned teams.

== Preliminary round ==
The schedule was released on 1 March 2023.

All times are local (UTC+1).

=== Group A ===
Pos	Team	Pld	W	D	L	GF	GA	GD	Pts	Qualification
1	France	3	2	1	0	98	85	+13	5	Main round
2	Germany (H)	3	2	0	1	91	72	+19	4	Main round
3	North Macedonia	3	1	0	2	83	100	−17	2	
4	Switzerland	3	0	1	2	67	82	−15	1	

Source: EHF
Rules for classification: Tiebreakers
(H) Hosts

10 January 2024; 18:00	France	39–29	North Macedonia	Merkur Spiel-Arena, Düsseldorf; Attendance: 53,586; Referees: Kurtagic, Wetterwik (SWE)
10 January 2024; 18:00	Descat 7	(17–13)	Peshevski 7	Merkur Spiel-Arena, Düsseldorf; Attendance: 53,586; Referees: Kurtagic, Wetterwik (SWE)
10 January 2024; 18:00		Report		Merkur Spiel-Arena, Düsseldorf; Attendance: 53,586; Referees: Kurtagic, Wetterwik (SWE)

10 January 2024; 20:45	Germany	27–14	Switzerland	Merkur Spiel-Arena, Düsseldorf; Attendance: 53,586; Referees: Madsen, Hansen (DEN)
10 January 2024; 20:45	Knorr 6	(13–8)	Rubin 4	Merkur Spiel-Arena, Düsseldorf; Attendance: 53,586; Referees: Madsen, Hansen (DEN)
10 January 2024; 20:45	1× (yellow card) 2× (suspension)	Report	1× (yellow card) 3× (suspension)	Merkur Spiel-Arena, Düsseldorf; Attendance: 53,586; Referees: Madsen, Hansen (DEN)

14 January 2024; 18:00	Switzerland	26–26	France	Mercedes-Benz Arena, Berlin; Attendance: 13,571; Referees: A. Konjičanin, D. Konjičanin (BIH)
14 January 2024; 18:00	Laube 9	(14–14)	Mem 7	Mercedes-Benz Arena, Berlin; Attendance: 13,571; Referees: A. Konjičanin, D. Konjičanin (BIH)
14 January 2024; 18:00	1× (yellow card) 3× (suspension)	Report	1× (yellow card) 2× (suspension)	Mercedes-Benz Arena, Berlin; Attendance: 13,571; Referees: A. Konjičanin, D. Konjičanin (BIH)

14 January 2024; 20:30	North Macedonia	25–34	Germany	Mercedes-Benz Arena, Berlin; Attendance: 13,571; Referees: D. Martins, R. Martins (POR)
14 January 2024; 20:30	Kosteski 6	(13–18)	Knorr 10	Mercedes-Benz Arena, Berlin; Attendance: 13,571; Referees: D. Martins, R. Martins (POR)
14 January 2024; 20:30	5× (suspension)	Report	1× (suspension)	Mercedes-Benz Arena, Berlin; Attendance: 13,571; Referees: D. Martins, R. Martins (POR)

16 January 2024; 18:00	North Macedonia	29–27	Switzerland	Mercedes-Benz Arena, Berlin; Attendance: 13,571; Referees: I. Covalciuc, A. Covalciuc (MDA)
16 January 2024; 18:00	Kosteski, Mitev 5	(13–9)	Schmid 12	Mercedes-Benz Arena, Berlin; Attendance: 13,571; Referees: I. Covalciuc, A. Covalciuc (MDA)
16 January 2024; 18:00	1× (yellow card) 2× (suspension)	Report	1× (suspension)	Mercedes-Benz Arena, Berlin; Attendance: 13,571; Referees: I. Covalciuc, A. Covalciuc (MDA)

16 January 2024; 20:30	France	33–30	Germany	Mercedes-Benz Arena, Berlin; Attendance: 13,571; Referees: Horáček, Novotný (CZE)
16 January 2024; 20:30	Mahé, Mem 5	(17–15)	Knorr 8	Mercedes-Benz Arena, Berlin; Attendance: 13,571; Referees: Horáček, Novotný (CZE)
16 January 2024; 20:30	2× (suspension)	Report	1× (yellow card) 2× (suspension)	Mercedes-Benz Arena, Berlin; Attendance: 13,571; Referees: Horáček, Novotný (CZE)

=== Group B ===
Pos	Team	Pld	W	D	L	GF	GA	GD	Pts	Qualification
1	Croatia	3	2	1	0	98	82	+16	5	Main round
2	Austria	3	1	2	0	92	85	+7	4	Main round
3	Spain	3	1	1	1	98	96	+2	3	
4	Romania	3	0	0	3	73	98	−25	0	

Source: EHF
Rules for classification: Tiebreakers

12 January 2024; 18:00	Austria	31–24	Romania	SAP Arena, Mannheim; Attendance: 13,293; Referees: Jørum, Kleven (NOR)
12 January 2024; 18:00	Frimmel 6	(15–14)	Grigoraș 6	SAP Arena, Mannheim; Attendance: 13,293; Referees: Jørum, Kleven (NOR)
12 January 2024; 18:00	2× (suspension)	Report	1× (yellow card) 3× (suspension) 2× (red card)	SAP Arena, Mannheim; Attendance: 13,293; Referees: Jørum, Kleven (NOR)

12 January 2024; 20:30	Spain	29–39	Croatia	SAP Arena, Mannheim; Attendance: 13,293; Referees: Horáček, Novotný (CZE)
12 January 2024; 20:30	Gómez 8	(14–18)	Martinović, Šoštarič 8	SAP Arena, Mannheim; Attendance: 13,293; Referees: Horáček, Novotný (CZE)
12 January 2024; 20:30	1× (suspension)	Report	2× (suspension)	SAP Arena, Mannheim; Attendance: 13,293; Referees: Horáček, Novotný (CZE)

14 January 2024; 18:00	Romania	24–36	Spain	SAP Arena, Mannheim; Attendance: 13,293; Referees: Lah, Sok (SLO)
14 January 2024; 18:00	Dedu, Nistor 4	(12–17)	Gómez 8	SAP Arena, Mannheim; Attendance: 13,293; Referees: Lah, Sok (SLO)
14 January 2024; 18:00	1× (yellow card) 2× (suspension)	Report	1× (yellow card) 1× (suspension)	SAP Arena, Mannheim; Attendance: 13,293; Referees: Lah, Sok (SLO)

14 January 2024; 20:30	Croatia	28–28	Austria	SAP Arena, Mannheim; Attendance: 13,293; Referees: Madsen, Hansen (DEN)
14 January 2024; 20:30	Šoštarič 6	(14–12)	Bilyk 7	SAP Arena, Mannheim; Attendance: 13,293; Referees: Madsen, Hansen (DEN)
14 January 2024; 20:30	3× (suspension)	Report	1× (yellow card) 4× (suspension)	SAP Arena, Mannheim; Attendance: 13,293; Referees: Madsen, Hansen (DEN)

16 January 2024; 18:00	Croatia	31–25	Romania	SAP Arena, Mannheim; Attendance: 13,293; Referees: A. Konjičanin, D. Konjičanin (BIH)
16 January 2024; 18:00	Klarica 7	(16–12)	Negru 9	SAP Arena, Mannheim; Attendance: 13,293; Referees: A. Konjičanin, D. Konjičanin (BIH)
16 January 2024; 18:00	4× (suspension) 1× (red card)	Report	1× (yellow card) 5× (suspension)	SAP Arena, Mannheim; Attendance: 13,293; Referees: A. Konjičanin, D. Konjičanin (BIH)

16 January 2024; 20:30	Spain	33–33	Austria	SAP Arena, Mannheim; Attendance: 13,293; Referees: Mažeika, Gatelis (LTU)
16 January 2024; 20:30	Gómez 8	(15–17)	Bilyk 8	SAP Arena, Mannheim; Attendance: 13,293; Referees: Mažeika, Gatelis (LTU)
16 January 2024; 20:30	1× (yellow card) 4× (suspension) 1× (red card)	Report	1× (yellow card) 4× (suspension)	SAP Arena, Mannheim; Attendance: 13,293; Referees: Mažeika, Gatelis (LTU)

=== Group C ===
Pos	Team	Pld	W	D	L	GF	GA	GD	Pts	Qualification
1	Hungary	3	3	0	0	87	76	+11	6	Main round
2	Iceland	3	1	1	1	83	90	−7	3	Main round
3	Montenegro	3	1	0	2	84	86	−2	2	
4	Serbia	3	0	1	2	83	85	−2	1	

Source: EHF
Rules for classification: Tiebreakers

12 January 2024; 18:00	Iceland	27–27	Serbia	Olympiahalle, Munich; Attendance: 12,128; Referees: D. Martins, R. Martins (POR)
12 January 2024; 18:00	Elísson 7	(11–10)	Pechmalbec 5	Olympiahalle, Munich; Attendance: 12,128; Referees: D. Martins, R. Martins (POR)
12 January 2024; 18:00	1× (suspension) 1× (red card)	Report	5× (suspension) 1× (red card)	Olympiahalle, Munich; Attendance: 12,128; Referees: D. Martins, R. Martins (POR)

12 January 2024; 20:30	Hungary	26–24	Montenegro	Olympiahalle, Munich; Attendance: 12,128; Referees: I. Covalciuc, A. Covalciuc (MDA)
12 January 2024; 20:30	Bánhidi 6	(14–14)	Borozan, Dragašević 6	Olympiahalle, Munich; Attendance: 12,128; Referees: I. Covalciuc, A. Covalciuc (MDA)
12 January 2024; 20:30	7× (suspension)	Report	7× (suspension) 1× (red card)	Olympiahalle, Munich; Attendance: 12,128; Referees: I. Covalciuc, A. Covalciuc (MDA)

14 January 2024; 18:00	Montenegro	30–31	Iceland	Olympiahalle, Munich; Attendance: 12,128; Referees: Mažeika, Gatelis (LTU)
14 January 2024; 18:00	Borozan 5	(15–17)	Magnússon 7	Olympiahalle, Munich; Attendance: 12,128; Referees: Mažeika, Gatelis (LTU)
14 January 2024; 18:00	1× (yellow card) 6× (suspension)	Report	4× (suspension)	Olympiahalle, Munich; Attendance: 12,128; Referees: Mažeika, Gatelis (LTU)

14 January 2024; 20:30	Serbia	27–28	Hungary	Olympiahalle, Munich; Attendance: 12,128; Referees: Jørum, Kleven (NOR)
14 January 2024; 20:30	N. Ilić, Vorkapić 5	(13–14)	Bánhidi 9	Olympiahalle, Munich; Attendance: 12,128; Referees: Jørum, Kleven (NOR)
14 January 2024; 20:30	6× (suspension)	Report	4× (suspension)	Olympiahalle, Munich; Attendance: 12,128; Referees: Jørum, Kleven (NOR)

16 January 2024; 18:00	Serbia	29–30	Montenegro	Olympiahalle, Munich; Attendance: 12,128; Referees: Kurtagic, Wetterwik (SWE)
16 January 2024; 18:00	Kukić 7	(14–15)	B. Vujović 8	Olympiahalle, Munich; Attendance: 12,128; Referees: Kurtagic, Wetterwik (SWE)
16 January 2024; 18:00	4× (suspension)	Report	4× (suspension) 1× (red card)	Olympiahalle, Munich; Attendance: 12,128; Referees: Kurtagic, Wetterwik (SWE)

16 January 2024; 20:30	Iceland	25–33	Hungary	Olympiahalle, Munich; Attendance: 12,128; Referees: Lah, Sok (SLO)
16 January 2024; 20:30	V. Kristjánsson 8	(13–15)	Hanusz, Szita 5	Olympiahalle, Munich; Attendance: 12,128; Referees: Lah, Sok (SLO)
16 January 2024; 20:30	4× (suspension)	Report	5× (suspension) 1× (red card)	Olympiahalle, Munich; Attendance: 12,128; Referees: Lah, Sok (SLO)

=== Group D ===
Pos	Team	Pld	W	D	L	GF	GA	GD	Pts	Qualification
1	Slovenia	3	3	0	0	92	81	+11	6	Main round
2	Norway	3	1	1	1	85	75	+10	3	Main round
3	Poland	3	1	0	2	78	92	−14	2	
4	Faroe Islands	3	0	1	2	83	90	−7	1	

Source: EHF
Rules for classification: Tiebreakers

11 January 2024; 18:00	Slovenia	32–29	Faroe Islands	Mercedes-Benz Arena, Berlin; Attendance: 11,625; Referees: Schulze, Tönnies (GER)
11 January 2024; 18:00	Vlah 8	(13–13)	E. á Skipagøtu, Av Teigum 9	Mercedes-Benz Arena, Berlin; Attendance: 11,625; Referees: Schulze, Tönnies (GER)
11 January 2024; 18:00	2× (yellow card) 5× (suspension)	Report	1× (yellow card) 3× (suspension)	Mercedes-Benz Arena, Berlin; Attendance: 11,625; Referees: Schulze, Tönnies (GER)

11 January 2024; 20:30	Norway	32–21	Poland	Mercedes-Benz Arena, Berlin; Attendance: 11,625; Referees: Pavićević, Ražnatović (MNE)
11 January 2024; 20:30	Sagosen 6	(15–10)	Sićko 5	Mercedes-Benz Arena, Berlin; Attendance: 11,625; Referees: Pavićević, Ražnatović (MNE)
11 January 2024; 20:30	1× (suspension)	Report	4× (suspension) 1× (red card)	Mercedes-Benz Arena, Berlin; Attendance: 11,625; Referees: Pavićević, Ražnatović (MNE)

13 January 2024; 18:00	Poland	25–32	Slovenia	Mercedes-Benz Arena, Berlin; Attendance: 13,571; Referees: Nikolov, Nachevski (MKD)
13 January 2024; 18:00	three players 4	(14–20)	Marguč 6	Mercedes-Benz Arena, Berlin; Attendance: 13,571; Referees: Nikolov, Nachevski (MKD)
13 January 2024; 18:00	1× (suspension)	Report	1× (yellow card) 3× (suspension)	Mercedes-Benz Arena, Berlin; Attendance: 13,571; Referees: Nikolov, Nachevski (MKD)

13 January 2024; 20:30	Faroe Islands	26–26	Norway	Mercedes-Benz Arena, Berlin; Attendance: 13,571; Referees: Brunner, Salah (SUI)
13 January 2024; 20:30	Rasmussen, E. á Skipagøtu 5	(12–13)	Blonz 8	Mercedes-Benz Arena, Berlin; Attendance: 13,571; Referees: Brunner, Salah (SUI)
13 January 2024; 20:30	2× (yellow card) 6× (suspension)	Report	1× (yellow card) 5× (suspension) 1× (red card)	Mercedes-Benz Arena, Berlin; Attendance: 13,571; Referees: Brunner, Salah (SUI)

15 January 2024; 18:00	Poland	32–28	Faroe Islands	Mercedes-Benz Arena, Berlin; Attendance: 13,321; Referees: Marín, García (ESP)
15 January 2024; 18:00	Sićko 10	(15–15)	Av Teigum 10	Mercedes-Benz Arena, Berlin; Attendance: 13,321; Referees: Marín, García (ESP)
15 January 2024; 18:00	2× (yellow card) 7× (suspension)	Report	5× (suspension)	Mercedes-Benz Arena, Berlin; Attendance: 13,321; Referees: Marín, García (ESP)

15 January 2024; 20:30	Norway	27–28	Slovenia	Mercedes-Benz Arena, Berlin; Attendance: 13,336; Referees: C. Bonaventura, J. Bonaventura (FRA)
15 January 2024; 20:30	Sagosen 6	(17–17)	Vlah 7	Mercedes-Benz Arena, Berlin; Attendance: 13,336; Referees: C. Bonaventura, J. Bonaventura (FRA)
15 January 2024; 20:30	3× (suspension)	Report	2× (yellow card) 9× (suspension)	Mercedes-Benz Arena, Berlin; Attendance: 13,336; Referees: C. Bonaventura, J. Bonaventura (FRA)

=== Group E ===
Pos	Team	Pld	W	D	L	GF	GA	GD	Pts	Qualification
1	Sweden	3	3	0	0	100	74	+26	6	Main round
2	Netherlands	3	2	0	1	98	78	+20	4	Main round
3	Georgia	3	1	0	2	77	95	−18	2	
4	Bosnia and Herzegovina	3	0	0	3	59	87	−28	0	

Source: EHF
Rules for classification: Tiebreakers

11 January 2024; 18:00	Netherlands	34–29	Georgia	SAP Arena, Mannheim; Attendance: 10,878; Referees: Marín, García (ESP)
11 January 2024; 18:00	Baijens, Ten Velde 6	(19–12)	Tskhovrebadze 9	SAP Arena, Mannheim; Attendance: 10,878; Referees: Marín, García (ESP)
11 January 2024; 18:00	1× (yellow card) 5× (suspension)	Report	4× (suspension)	SAP Arena, Mannheim; Attendance: 10,878; Referees: Marín, García (ESP)

11 January 2024; 20:30	Sweden	29–20	Bosnia and Herzegovina	SAP Arena, Mannheim; Attendance: 10,903; Referees: Merz, Kuttler (GER)
11 January 2024; 20:30	Wanne 9	(14–7)	Faljić 4	SAP Arena, Mannheim; Attendance: 10,903; Referees: Merz, Kuttler (GER)
11 January 2024; 20:30	2× (yellow card)	Report	1× (yellow card) 1× (suspension)	SAP Arena, Mannheim; Attendance: 10,903; Referees: Merz, Kuttler (GER)

13 January 2024; 18:00	Bosnia and Herzegovina	20–36	Netherlands	SAP Arena, Mannheim; Attendance: 13,293; Referees: Elíasson, Pálsson (ISL)
13 January 2024; 18:00	Davidović 4	(7–17)	Ten Velde 9	SAP Arena, Mannheim; Attendance: 13,293; Referees: Elíasson, Pálsson (ISL)
13 January 2024; 18:00	6× (suspension)	Report	1× (yellow card) 4× (suspension)	SAP Arena, Mannheim; Attendance: 13,293; Referees: Elíasson, Pálsson (ISL)

13 January 2024; 20:30	Georgia	26–42	Sweden	SAP Arena, Mannheim; Attendance: 13,293; Referees: Pavićević, Ražnatović (MNE)
13 January 2024; 20:30	Arsenashvili 6	(9–23)	Karlsson 7	SAP Arena, Mannheim; Attendance: 13,293; Referees: Pavićević, Ražnatović (MNE)
13 January 2024; 20:30	2× (suspension)	Report	2× (suspension)	SAP Arena, Mannheim; Attendance: 13,293; Referees: Pavićević, Ražnatović (MNE)

15 January 2024; 18:00	Bosnia and Herzegovina	19–22	Georgia	SAP Arena, Mannheim; Attendance: 13,196; Referees: K. Gasmi, R. Gasmi (FRA)
15 January 2024; 18:00	Panić 7	(9–9)	Tskhovrebadze 7	SAP Arena, Mannheim; Attendance: 13,196; Referees: K. Gasmi, R. Gasmi (FRA)
15 January 2024; 18:00	2× (suspension) 1× (red card)	Report	1× (suspension)	SAP Arena, Mannheim; Attendance: 13,196; Referees: K. Gasmi, R. Gasmi (FRA)

15 January 2024; 20:30	Sweden	29–28	Netherlands	SAP Arena, Mannheim; Attendance: 13,203; Referees: Nikolov, Nachevski (MKD)
15 January 2024; 20:30	Claar, Wanne 5	(15–15)	Steins 6	SAP Arena, Mannheim; Attendance: 13,203; Referees: Nikolov, Nachevski (MKD)
15 January 2024; 20:30	4× (suspension)	Report	1× (yellow card) 2× (suspension)	SAP Arena, Mannheim; Attendance: 13,203; Referees: Nikolov, Nachevski (MKD)

=== Group F ===
Pos	Team	Pld	W	D	L	GF	GA	GD	Pts	Qualification
1	Denmark	3	3	0	0	100	69	+31	6	Main round
2	Portugal	3	2	0	1	88	88	0	4	Main round
3	Czech Republic	3	1	0	2	70	73	−3	2	
4	Greece	3	0	0	3	72	100	−28	0	

Source: EHF
Rules for classification: Tiebreakers

11 January 2024; 18:00	Portugal	31–24	Greece	Olympiahalle, Munich; Attendance: 11,607; Referees: C. Bonaventura, J. Bonaventura (FRA)
11 January 2024; 18:00	F. Costa 6	(18–14)	three players 5	Olympiahalle, Munich; Attendance: 11,607; Referees: C. Bonaventura, J. Bonaventura (FRA)
11 January 2024; 18:00	2× (suspension)	Report	1× (yellow card) 2× (suspension)	Olympiahalle, Munich; Attendance: 11,607; Referees: C. Bonaventura, J. Bonaventura (FRA)

11 January 2024; 20:30	Denmark	23–14	Czech Republic	Olympiahalle, Munich; Attendance: 11,615; Referees: K. Gasmi, R. Gasmi (FRA)
11 January 2024; 20:30	M. Hansen 5	(9–9)	Patzel 4	Olympiahalle, Munich; Attendance: 11,615; Referees: K. Gasmi, R. Gasmi (FRA)
11 January 2024; 20:30	1× (yellow card) 3× (suspension)	Report	3× (suspension)	Olympiahalle, Munich; Attendance: 11,615; Referees: K. Gasmi, R. Gasmi (FRA)

13 January 2024; 18:00	Czech Republic	27–30	Portugal	Olympiahalle, Munich; Attendance: 12,128; Referees: Schulze, Tönnies (GER)
13 January 2024; 18:00	Klíma 8	(7–13)	M. Costa 11	Olympiahalle, Munich; Attendance: 12,128; Referees: Schulze, Tönnies (GER)
13 January 2024; 18:00	2× (yellow card) 2× (suspension) 1× (red card)	Report	7× (suspension)	Olympiahalle, Munich; Attendance: 12,128; Referees: Schulze, Tönnies (GER)

13 January 2024; 20:30	Greece	28–40	Denmark	Olympiahalle, Munich; Attendance: 12,128; Referees: Merz, Kuttler (GER)
13 January 2024; 20:30	Boskos, Kederis 4	(13–20)	Damgaard 10	Olympiahalle, Munich; Attendance: 12,128; Referees: Merz, Kuttler (GER)
13 January 2024; 20:30	5× (suspension)	Report	2× (suspension)	Olympiahalle, Munich; Attendance: 12,128; Referees: Merz, Kuttler (GER)

15 January 2024; 18:00	Czech Republic	29–20	Greece	Olympiahalle, Munich; Attendance: 12,128; Referees: Elíasson, Pálsson (ISL)
15 January 2024; 18:00	Štěrba 7	(15–8)	Kederis 5	Olympiahalle, Munich; Attendance: 12,128; Referees: Elíasson, Pálsson (ISL)
15 January 2024; 18:00	1× (yellow card) 4× (suspension)	Report	5× (suspension)	Olympiahalle, Munich; Attendance: 12,128; Referees: Elíasson, Pálsson (ISL)

15 January 2024; 20:30	Denmark	37–27	Portugal	Olympiahalle, Munich; Attendance: 12,128; Referees: Brunner, Salah (SUI)
15 January 2024; 20:30	Gidsel 11	(17–15)	M. Costa 9	Olympiahalle, Munich; Attendance: 12,128; Referees: Brunner, Salah (SUI)
15 January 2024; 20:30	1× (yellow card) 2× (suspension)	Report	1× (yellow card) 5× (suspension)	Olympiahalle, Munich; Attendance: 12,128; Referees: Brunner, Salah (SUI)

== Main round ==
Points and goals gained in the preliminary group against teams that advance were transferred to the main round.

=== Group I ===
Pos	Team	Pld	W	D	L	GF	GA	GD	Pts	Qualification
1	France	5	5	0	0	174	154	+20	10	Semifinals
2	Germany (H)	5	2	1	2	137	137	0	5	Semifinals
3	Hungary	5	2	0	3	151	151	0	4 (Note: Hungary 2 Pts, +7 GD; Austria 2 Pts, −1 GD; Iceland 2 Pts, −6 GD)	Fifth place game
4	Austria	5	1	2	2	132	138	−6	4	
5	Iceland	5	2	0	3	142	152	−10	4	
6	Croatia	5	1	1	3	146	150	−4	3	

Source: EHF
Rules for classification: Tiebreakers
(H) Hosts
Notes:

18 January 2024; 15:30	Hungary	29–30	Austria	Lanxess Arena, Cologne; Attendance: 19,750; Referees: D. Martins, R. Martins (POR)
18 January 2024; 15:30	four players 4	(17–17)	Bilyk 8	Lanxess Arena, Cologne; Attendance: 19,750; Referees: D. Martins, R. Martins (POR)
18 January 2024; 15:30	2× (suspension)	Report	1× (yellow card) 4× (suspension)	Lanxess Arena, Cologne; Attendance: 19,750; Referees: D. Martins, R. Martins (POR)

18 January 2024; 18:00	France	34–32	Croatia	Lanxess Arena, Cologne; Attendance: 19,750; Referees: Jørum, Kleven (NOR)
18 January 2024; 18:00	Mem 6	(18–18)	Srna 6	Lanxess Arena, Cologne; Attendance: 19,750; Referees: Jørum, Kleven (NOR)
18 January 2024; 18:00	5× (suspension) 1× (red card)	Report	1× (yellow card) 5× (suspension)	Lanxess Arena, Cologne; Attendance: 19,750; Referees: Jørum, Kleven (NOR)

18 January 2024; 20:30	Germany	26–24	Iceland	Lanxess Arena, Cologne; Attendance: 19,750; Referees: Nikolov, Nachevski (MKD)
18 January 2024; 20:30	Knorr 6	(11–10)	Smárason 6	Lanxess Arena, Cologne; Attendance: 19,750; Referees: Nikolov, Nachevski (MKD)
18 January 2024; 20:30	1× (yellow card) 2× (suspension)	Report	2× (yellow card) 2× (suspension)	Lanxess Arena, Cologne; Attendance: 19,750; Referees: Nikolov, Nachevski (MKD)

20 January 2024; 15:30	France	39–32	Iceland	Lanxess Arena, Cologne; Attendance: 19,750; Referees: Madsen, Hansen (DEN)
20 January 2024; 15:30	Fabregas, Richardson 6	(17–14)	three players 6	Lanxess Arena, Cologne; Attendance: 19,750; Referees: Madsen, Hansen (DEN)
20 January 2024; 15:30	4× (suspension)	Report	1× (yellow card) 3× (suspension)	Lanxess Arena, Cologne; Attendance: 19,750; Referees: Madsen, Hansen (DEN)

20 January 2024; 18:00	Hungary	29–26	Croatia	Lanxess Arena, Cologne; Attendance: 19,750; Referees: Lah, Sok (SLO)
20 January 2024; 18:00	Imre 7	(14–13)	Glavaš, Lučin 5	Lanxess Arena, Cologne; Attendance: 19,750; Referees: Lah, Sok (SLO)
20 January 2024; 18:00	3× (yellow card) 4× (suspension)	Report	1× (yellow card) 6× (suspension)	Lanxess Arena, Cologne; Attendance: 19,750; Referees: Lah, Sok (SLO)

20 January 2024; 20:30	Germany	22–22	Austria	Lanxess Arena, Cologne; Attendance: 19,750; Referees: Kurtagic, Wetterwik (SWE)
20 January 2024; 20:30	Knorr 6	(11–12)	Bilyk 5	Lanxess Arena, Cologne; Attendance: 19,750; Referees: Kurtagic, Wetterwik (SWE)
20 January 2024; 20:30	1× (yellow card) 3× (suspension)	Report	1× (yellow card) 3× (suspension)	Lanxess Arena, Cologne; Attendance: 19,750; Referees: Kurtagic, Wetterwik (SWE)

22 January 2024; 15:30	Croatia	30–35	Iceland	Lanxess Arena, Cologne; Attendance: 19,750; Referees: D. Martins, R. Martins (POR)
22 January 2024; 15:30	Jelinić 6	(18–16)	Elísson 8	Lanxess Arena, Cologne; Attendance: 19,750; Referees: D. Martins, R. Martins (POR)
22 January 2024; 15:30	5× (suspension)	Report	1× (suspension) 1× (red card)	Lanxess Arena, Cologne; Attendance: 19,750; Referees: D. Martins, R. Martins (POR)

22 January 2024; 18:00	France	33–28	Austria	Lanxess Arena, Cologne; Attendance: 19,750; Referees: Horáček, Novotný (CZE)
22 January 2024; 18:00	Fabregas, Mem 7	(15–16)	Bilyk, Hutecek 6	Lanxess Arena, Cologne; Attendance: 19,750; Referees: Horáček, Novotný (CZE)
22 January 2024; 18:00	2× (suspension)	Report	4× (suspension)	Lanxess Arena, Cologne; Attendance: 19,750; Referees: Horáček, Novotný (CZE)

22 January 2024; 20:30	Germany	35–28	Hungary	Lanxess Arena, Cologne; Attendance: 19,750; Referees: Jørum, Kleven (NOR)
22 January 2024; 20:30	Köster 8	(18–17)	Ancsin, Rosta 6	Lanxess Arena, Cologne; Attendance: 19,750; Referees: Jørum, Kleven (NOR)
22 January 2024; 20:30	3× (suspension)	Report	1× (yellow card) 1× (suspension)	Lanxess Arena, Cologne; Attendance: 19,750; Referees: Jørum, Kleven (NOR)

24 January 2024; 15:30	Austria	24–26	Iceland	Lanxess Arena, Cologne; Attendance: 19,750; Referees: Pavićević, Ražnatović (MNE)
24 January 2024; 15:30	Wagner 7	(8–14)	Guðjónsson 8	Lanxess Arena, Cologne; Attendance: 19,750; Referees: Pavićević, Ražnatović (MNE)
24 January 2024; 15:30	3× (suspension)	Report	1× (yellow card) 4× (suspension) 1× (red card)	Lanxess Arena, Cologne; Attendance: 19,750; Referees: Pavićević, Ražnatović (MNE)

24 January 2024; 18:00	France	35–32	Hungary	Lanxess Arena, Cologne; Attendance: 19,750; Referees: Lah, Sok (SLO)
24 January 2024; 18:00	Remili 7	(20–18)	Bánhidi, Rosta 5	Lanxess Arena, Cologne; Attendance: 19,750; Referees: Lah, Sok (SLO)
24 January 2024; 18:00	1× (yellow card) 3× (suspension)	Report	3× (suspension)	Lanxess Arena, Cologne; Attendance: 19,750; Referees: Lah, Sok (SLO)

24 January 2024; 20:30	Germany	24–30	Croatia	Lanxess Arena, Cologne; Attendance: 19,750; Referees: Marín, García (ESP)
24 January 2024; 20:30	Golla, Heymann 4	(14–13)	Karačić 6	Lanxess Arena, Cologne; Attendance: 19,750; Referees: Marín, García (ESP)
24 January 2024; 20:30	1× (yellow card) 2× (suspension)	Report	3× (suspension)	Lanxess Arena, Cologne; Attendance: 19,750; Referees: Marín, García (ESP)

=== Group II ===
Pos	Team	Pld	W	D	L	GF	GA	GD	Pts	Qualification
1	Denmark	5	4	0	1	158	132	+26	8	Semifinals
2	Sweden	5	3	0	2	147	144	+3	6 (Note: Slovenia 22–28 Sweden)	Semifinals
3	Slovenia	5	3	0	2	145	147	−2	6	Fifth place game
4	Portugal	5	2	1	2	163	172	−9	5	
5	Norway	5	2	0	3	150	149	+1	4	
6	Netherlands	5	0	1	4	154	173	−19	1	

Source: EHF
Rules for classification: Tiebreakers
Notes:

17 January 2024; 15:30	Norway	32–37	Portugal	Barclays Arena, Hamburg; Attendance: 8,707; Referees: Schulze, Tönnies (GER)
17 January 2024; 15:30	Blonz 7	(15–18)	Portela 8	Barclays Arena, Hamburg; Attendance: 8,707; Referees: Schulze, Tönnies (GER)
17 January 2024; 15:30	2× (suspension)	Report	2× (suspension)	Barclays Arena, Hamburg; Attendance: 8,707; Referees: Schulze, Tönnies (GER)

17 January 2024; 18:00	Denmark	39–27	Netherlands	Barclays Arena, Hamburg; Attendance: 9,568; Referees: C. Bonaventura, J. Bonaventura (FRA)
17 January 2024; 18:00	Gidsel 9	(18–17)	Ten Velde 8	Barclays Arena, Hamburg; Attendance: 9,568; Referees: C. Bonaventura, J. Bonaventura (FRA)
17 January 2024; 18:00	1× (suspension)	Report	6× (suspension)	Barclays Arena, Hamburg; Attendance: 9,568; Referees: C. Bonaventura, J. Bonaventura (FRA)

17 January 2024; 20:30	Slovenia	22–28	Sweden	Barclays Arena, Hamburg; Attendance: 9,933; Referees: Marín, García (ESP)
17 January 2024; 20:30	Vlah 7	(7–11)	Pellas 8	Barclays Arena, Hamburg; Attendance: 9,933; Referees: Marín, García (ESP)
17 January 2024; 20:30	2× (yellow card) 2× (suspension)	Report	1× (yellow card) 3× (suspension)	Barclays Arena, Hamburg; Attendance: 9,933; Referees: Marín, García (ESP)

19 January 2024; 15:30	Slovenia	30–33	Portugal	Barclays Arena, Hamburg; Attendance: 13,376; Referees: C. Bonaventura, J. Bonaventura (FRA)
19 January 2024; 15:30	Mačkovšek 7	(17–18)	M. Costa 11	Barclays Arena, Hamburg; Attendance: 13,376; Referees: C. Bonaventura, J. Bonaventura (FRA)
19 January 2024; 15:30	1× (yellow card) 3× (suspension)	Report	2× (yellow card) 2× (suspension)	Barclays Arena, Hamburg; Attendance: 13,376; Referees: C. Bonaventura, J. Bonaventura (FRA)

19 January 2024; 18:00	Norway	35–32	Netherlands	Barclays Arena, Hamburg; Attendance: 13,376; Referees: Pavićević, Ražnatović (MNE)
19 January 2024; 18:00	four players 6	(16–18)	Ten Velde 8	Barclays Arena, Hamburg; Attendance: 13,376; Referees: Pavićević, Ražnatović (MNE)
19 January 2024; 18:00	4× (suspension)	Report	3× (suspension)	Barclays Arena, Hamburg; Attendance: 13,376; Referees: Pavićević, Ražnatović (MNE)

19 January 2024; 20:30	Denmark	28–27	Sweden	Barclays Arena, Hamburg; Attendance: 13,376; Referees: Horáček, Novotný (CZE)
19 January 2024; 20:30	Gidsel 10	(17–15)	Wanne 9	Barclays Arena, Hamburg; Attendance: 13,376; Referees: Horáček, Novotný (CZE)
19 January 2024; 20:30	4× (suspension)	Report	5× (suspension)	Barclays Arena, Hamburg; Attendance: 13,376; Referees: Horáček, Novotný (CZE)

21 January 2024; 15:30	Slovenia	37–34	Netherlands	Barclays Arena, Hamburg; Attendance: 13,376; Referees: Schulze, Tönnies (GER)
21 January 2024; 15:30	three players 6	(19–13)	N. Versteijnen 15	Barclays Arena, Hamburg; Attendance: 13,376; Referees: Schulze, Tönnies (GER)
21 January 2024; 15:30	3× (suspension)	Report	1× (yellow card) 2× (suspension)	Barclays Arena, Hamburg; Attendance: 13,376; Referees: Schulze, Tönnies (GER)

21 January 2024; 18:00	Sweden	40–33	Portugal	Barclays Arena, Hamburg; Attendance: 13,376; Referees: Nikolov, Nachevski (MKD)
21 January 2024; 18:00	Pellas 10	(19–15)	M. Costa 8	Barclays Arena, Hamburg; Attendance: 13,376; Referees: Nikolov, Nachevski (MKD)
21 January 2024; 18:00	4× (suspension)	Report	2× (suspension)	Barclays Arena, Hamburg; Attendance: 13,376; Referees: Nikolov, Nachevski (MKD)

21 January 2024; 20:30	Norway	23–29	Denmark	Barclays Arena, Hamburg; Attendance: 13,376; Referees: Marín, García (ESP)
21 January 2024; 20:30	Blonz 5	(11–18)	three players 5	Barclays Arena, Hamburg; Attendance: 13,376; Referees: Marín, García (ESP)
21 January 2024; 20:30	1× (suspension)	Report	2× (yellow card) 2× (suspension)	Barclays Arena, Hamburg; Attendance: 13,376; Referees: Marín, García (ESP)

23 January 2024; 15:30	Netherlands	33–33	Portugal	Barclays Arena, Hamburg; Attendance: 8,868; Referees: Madsen, Hansen (DEN)
23 January 2024; 15:30	Ten Velde 7	(17–15)	M. Costa, Frade 8	Barclays Arena, Hamburg; Attendance: 8,868; Referees: Madsen, Hansen (DEN)
23 January 2024; 15:30	1× (yellow card) 2× (suspension)	Report	2× (suspension)	Barclays Arena, Hamburg; Attendance: 8,868; Referees: Madsen, Hansen (DEN)

23 January 2024; 18:00	Slovenia	28–25	Denmark	Barclays Arena, Hamburg; Attendance: 9,016; Referees: Kurtagic, Wetterwik (SWE)
23 January 2024; 18:00	Horžen 6	(17–14)	Jørgensen, Kirkeløkke 6	Barclays Arena, Hamburg; Attendance: 9,016; Referees: Kurtagic, Wetterwik (SWE)
23 January 2024; 18:00	1× (yellow card) 3× (suspension)	Report	2× (suspension)	Barclays Arena, Hamburg; Attendance: 9,016; Referees: Kurtagic, Wetterwik (SWE)

23 January 2024; 20:30	Norway	33–23	Sweden	Barclays Arena, Hamburg; Attendance: 9,031; Referees: C. Bonaventura, J. Bonaventura (FRA)
23 January 2024; 20:30	Blonz 11	(15–12)	Sandell 4	Barclays Arena, Hamburg; Attendance: 9,031; Referees: C. Bonaventura, J. Bonaventura (FRA)
23 January 2024; 20:30	1× (yellow card) 1× (suspension)	Report	6× (suspension)	Barclays Arena, Hamburg; Attendance: 9,031; Referees: C. Bonaventura, J. Bonaventura (FRA)

== Knockout stage ==
=== Bracket ===
Semi-finals
26 January
France (ET)	34
Sweden	30
26 January
Germany	26
Denmark	29

Final
28 January
France (ET)	33
Denmark	31
Third place
28 January
Sweden	34
Germany	31

=== Fifth place game ===
26 January 2024; 15:00	Hungary	23–22	Slovenia	Lanxess Arena, Cologne; Attendance: 19,750; Referees: Schulze, Tönnies (GER)
26 January 2024; 15:00	Bánhidi, Lékai 5	(12–13)	three players 4	Lanxess Arena, Cologne; Attendance: 19,750; Referees: Schulze, Tönnies (GER)
26 January 2024; 15:00	5× (suspension) 1× (red card)	Report	2× (suspension)	Lanxess Arena, Cologne; Attendance: 19,750; Referees: Schulze, Tönnies (GER)

=== Semifinals ===
26 January 2024
17:45
France
34–30 (ET)
Sweden
Lanxess Arena, Cologne
Attendance: 19,750
Referees: Nikolov, Nachevski (MKD)
Descat 8
(17–11)
Claar 9
4× (suspension)
Report
1× (suspension)

FT: 27–27 ET: 7–3

26 January 2024; 20:30	Germany	26–29	Denmark	Lanxess Arena, Cologne; Attendance: 19,750; Referees: Lah, Sok (SLO)
26 January 2024; 20:30	Uščins 5	(14–12)	three players 5	Lanxess Arena, Cologne; Attendance: 19,750; Referees: Lah, Sok (SLO)
26 January 2024; 20:30	2× (yellow card) 3× (suspension)	Report	4× (suspension)	Lanxess Arena, Cologne; Attendance: 19,750; Referees: Lah, Sok (SLO)

=== Third place game ===
28 January 2024; 15:00	Sweden	34–31	Germany	Lanxess Arena, Cologne; Attendance: 19,750; Referees: Pavićević, Ražnatović (MNE)
28 January 2024; 15:00	Claar 8	(18–12)	Uščins 8	Lanxess Arena, Cologne; Attendance: 19,750; Referees: Pavićević, Ražnatović (MNE)
28 January 2024; 15:00	3× (suspension)	Report		Lanxess Arena, Cologne; Attendance: 19,750; Referees: Pavićević, Ražnatović (MNE)

=== Final ===
28 January 2024
17:45
France
33–31 (ET)
Denmark
Lanxess Arena, Cologne
Attendance: 19,750
Referees: Marín, García (ESP)
Fabregas 8
(14–14)
M. Hansen 9
2× (yellow card) 4× (suspension)
Report
1× (yellow card) 3× (suspension)

FT: 27–27 ET: 6–4

== Ranking and statistics ==
=== Final ranking ===
The teams ranked fourth in each group after the completion of the preliminary round matches will be ranked 19 to 24, while teams ranked third in each group after the completion of the preliminary round matches will be ranked 13 to 18 according to the number of points won in the preliminary round. Places seven or eight will be attributed to the two teams ranked fourth in the main round groups, places nine and ten to the two teams ranked fifth in the main round groups, places eleven and twelve to the two teams ranked sixth in the main round groups according to the number of points won by the respective teams after completion of the main round matches. Places one to six will be decided by play–off or knock–out.

Rank	Team	Qualification		
Rank	Team	OG	WC	EC
1st place, gold medalist(s)	France	Q	Q	Q
2nd place, silver medalist(s)	Denmark	Q	Q	Q
3rd place, bronze medalist(s)	Sweden	Q	Q	Q
4	Germany	q	Q	q2
5	Hungary	q	q2	q2
6	Slovenia	q	q2	q2
7	Portugal	q	q2	q2
8	Austria	q	q2	q2
9	Norway	q	Q	Q
10	Iceland		q2	q2
11	Croatia	q	Q	q2
12	Netherlands		q2	q2
13	Spain	q	q2	q2
14	Montenegro		q2	q2
15	Czech Republic		q2	q2
16	Poland		q2	q2
17	North Macedonia		q2	q2
18	Georgia		q2	q2
19	Serbia		q2	q2
20	Faroe Islands		q2	q2
21	Switzerland		q2	q2
22	Romania		q2	q2
23	Greece		q2	q2
24	Bosnia and Herzegovina		q2	q2

Entry stage
Q	Final tournament
q2	Qualification phase 2 (2025 World Championship and 2026 European Championship)
q	2024 Olympic Qualification Tournaments
Method of qualification
	Qualified for the phase indicated based on this tournament
	Qualified for the phase indicated based on the 2023 World Championship
	Qualified for the final tournament as host
	Qualified for the final tournament as defending champion

2024 Men's European Champions

France
4th title

Team roster: Samir Bellahcene, Yanis Lenne, Nedim Remili, Elohim Prandi, Melvyn Richardson, Dika Mem, Nicolas Tournat, Nikola Karabatić, Kentin Mahé, Charles Bolzinger, Timothey N'Guessan, Luka Karabatic, Ludovic Fabregas, Hugo Descat, Valentin Porte, Benoît Kounkoud, Dylan Nahi, Karl Konan, Rémi Desbonnet.
Head Coach: Guillaume Gille

=== All Star Team ===
The all-star team was announced on 28 January 2024.

Position	Player
Most valuable player	(France) Nedim Remili
Best defender	(Denmark) Magnus Saugstrup
Goalkeeper	(Germany) Andreas Wolff
Right wing	(Austria) Robert Weber
Right back	(Denmark) Mathias Gidsel
Centre back	(Germany) Juri Knorr
Left back	(Portugal) Martim Costa
Left wing	(Sweden) Hampus Wanne
Pivot	(France) Ludovic Fabregas

=== Statistics ===
==== Top goalscorers ====
Rank	Name	Goals	Shots	%
1	(Portugal) Martim Costa	54	81	67
1	(Denmark) Mathias Gidsel	54	66	82
3	(Germany) Juri Knorr	50	86	58
4	(France) Dika Mem	49	76	64
5	(Netherlands) Rutger ten Velde	45	65	69
6	(France) Ludovic Fabregas	44	50	88
6	(Slovenia) Aleks Vlah	44	75	59
8	(Austria) Mykola Bilyk	41	72	57
9	(Netherlands) Niels Versteijnen	39	59	66
10	(Sweden) Felix Claar	38	52	73

==== Top goalkeepers ====
Rank	Name	%	Saves	Shots
1	(Denmark) Emil Nielsen	39	77	195
2	(Sweden) Andreas Palicka	38	77	205
3	(Croatia) Dominik Kuzmanović	37	55	148
3	(Czech Republic) Tomáš Mrkva	37	34	93
5	(Austria) Constantin Möstl	35	81	229
6	(Germany) Andreas Wolff	34	92	274
7	(Norway) Torbjørn Bergerud	32	56	175
8	(France) Samir Bellahcene	31	63	204
8	(Iceland) Viktor Gísli Hallgrímsson	31	64	204
8	(Denmark) Niklas Landin Jacobsen	31	50	163
8	(North Macedonia) Martin Tomovski	31	17	54

==== Fair play ranking ====
Rank	Team	(Penalty) points		(red card) (8 pts)	(suspension) (2 pts)	(yellow card) (1 pt)	MP
Rank	Team	Avg.	Total	(red card) (8 pts)	(suspension) (2 pts)	(yellow card) (1 pt)	MP
1	Georgia	4.7	14		7		3
2	Germany	4.8	43		18	7	9
3	North Macedonia	5.0	15		7	1	3
4	Switzerland	5.3	16		7	2	3
5	Denmark	5.7	51		23	5	9
6	France	6.2	56		26	4	9
7	Norway	6.3	44	1	17	2	7
8	Sweden	6.6	59		28	3	9
9	Portugal	6.7	47		22	3	7
10	Spain	7.3	22	1	6	2	3
11	Austria	7.4	52		24	4	7
12	Netherlands	7.6	53		24	5	7
13	Croatia	8.3	58		28	2	7
13	Greece	8.3	25		12	1	3
13	Iceland	8.3	58	2	19	4	7
16	Slovenia	8.6	69		30	9	8
17	Poland	8.7	26		12	2	3
18	Bosnia and Herzegovina	9.0	27	1	9	1	3
19	Hungary	9.3	74	1	31	4	8
20	Czech Republic	9.7	29	1	9	3	3
21	Serbia	10.0	30		15		3
22	Faroe Islands	10.3	31		14	3	3
23	Romania	13.0	39	2	10	3	3
24	Montenegro	14.3	43	1	17	1	3
