= Andorra men's national handball team =

Andorra

Information
- Association: Andorra Handball Federation
- Coach: Àlex Weikert
- Assistant coach: Edgar Serra
- Captain: Adrià Pifarré
- Most caps: Kevin Mascaró (12)
- Most goals: Pol Soto (56)

Colours
1st	2nd

Results

IHF Emerging Nations Championship
- Appearances: 3 (First in 2015)
- Best result: 8th (2023)
- Last updated on 2023.

The Andorra national handball team is the national handball team of Andorra, representing the country in international matches. It is controlled by the Andorran Handball Federation (Federació Andorrana d'Handbol).

== History ==
Andorra gained full membership to the European Handball Federation in the 11th Extraordinary EHF Congress on 29 May 2011. The men's national team played its first official match, a friendly, on 7 October 2011, hosting Ireland. 350 fans gathered together to witness the game, which was won by the visitors in the dying seconds to 30–29.

In 2015, Andorra played the IHF Emerging Nations Championship in Kosovo, where it only could win one of the six games played.

In 2023, Andorra reached their best result in the IHF Emerging Nations Championship in Varna, Bulgaria, by finishing 8th in the standings. The team managed to finish 2nd in their group after winning against Malta with an outstanding performance from Unai Ruiz, who scored 21 goals during the group stage games. After that, Andorra played for the 5th-8th position of the tournament but lost against Australia and Nigeria. Furthermore, Andorra accomplished advancing to the EURO 2026 Qualification Relegation Round by being the 3rd European nation in the tournament, as Great Britain was already qualified for the EURO 2026 Qualification Relegation Round.

== Tournament record ==
=== Emerging Nations Championship ===
Year	Position	Pld	W	D	L
(Kosovo) 2015	15th	6	1	0	5
(Bulgaria) 2017	14th	6	1	0	5
(Georgia (country)) 2019	Did not qualify				
(Bulgaria) 2023	8th	4	1	0	3
Total		16	3	0	13

=== IHF/EHF Trophy ===
Year	Position	Pld	W	D	L
(Georgia (country)) 2021	5th	2	0	0	2
Total		2	0	0	2

== Statistics ==
=== Goalscorers ===
Goals scored in official international matches held between 2017 and 2023

Rank	Player	Games played	Goals
1	Unai Ruiz	6	37
2	Alex Toha	6	30
3	Daniel Jimenez	12	23
4	Alex Bernabe	8	22
5	Hector Rodriguez	6	17
6	Adrià Pifarre	12	16
7	Joel Brard	6	13
8	Joan Travesset	8	13
9	Aitor Pascual	3	12
10	Alex Ros	4	12
