= Juri Knorr =

German handball player (born 2000)

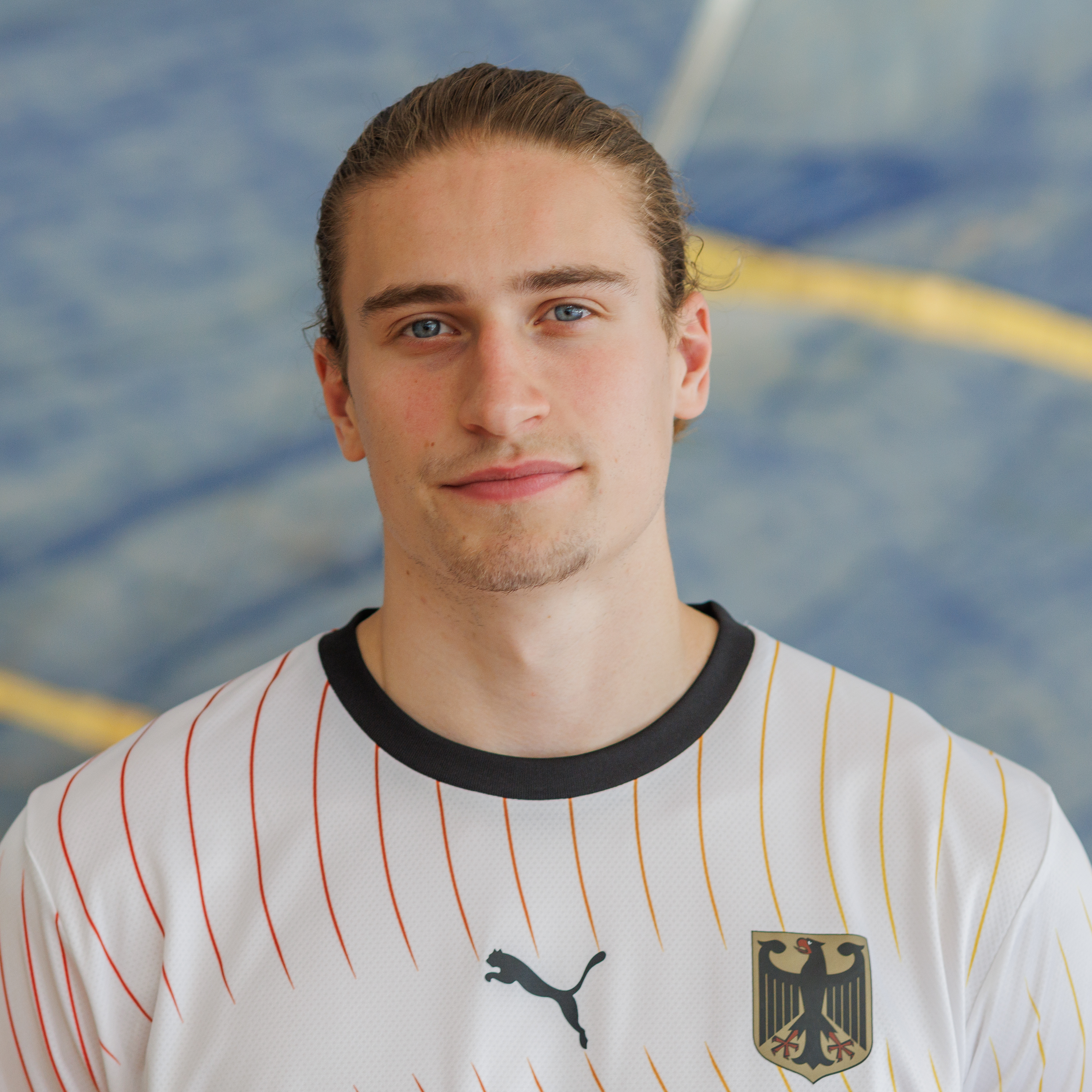
- Knorr in 2024

Personal information
- Nationality: German
- Born: 9 May 2000 (age 26) Flensburg, Germany
- Height: 1.90 m (6 ft 3 in)

Sport
- Sport: Handball
- Position: Centre back
- Current club: Aalborg Håndbold
- Number: 21

Youth career
- Years: Team
- –: VfL Bad Schwartau
- –: MTV Lübeck
- 2016-2017: VfL Bad Schwartau

Senior clubs
- Years: Team
- 2017–2018: HSG Ostsee N/G
- 2018–2019: FC Barcelona B
- 2019–2021: GWD Minden
- 2021–2025: Rhein-Neckar Löwen
- 2025–: Aalborg Håndbold
National team
Years	Team	Apps	(Gls)
2020–	Germany	97	(384)
Medal record
Olympic Games
Silver medal – second place	2024 Paris	Team
European Championship
Silver medal – second place	2026 Denmark/Norway/Sweden
- Updated on 8 November 2026

Juri Knorr (born 9 May 2000) is a German handball player for Aalborg Håndbold and the German national team. He won a silver medal with Germany at the 2024 Summer Olympics and has been named to several All-Star Teams, including at the 2024 European Championship and the 2024 Olympics.

== Career ==
=== Clubs ===
Knorr started playing handball in the youth program from VfL Bad Schwartau. He later joined MTV Lübeck. In addition, he played football for VfL Bad Schwartau and VfB Lübeck until 2015. Knorr returned to VfL Bad Schwartau, where he played in the A-Jugend-Bundesliga (German youth league). He left VfL in 2017, at the age of 17, and joined HSG Ostsee N/G, which was trained by his father Thomas Knorr. In 2018 he moved to FC Barcelona, playing for their second division team. In December 2018 he made his debut in FC Barcelona's top team, where he played a total of six games. In 2019 he signed for the German Handball-Bundesliga club GWD Minden. From 2021 to 2025, he played for Rhein-Neckar Löwen. With Rhein-Neckar Löwen he won the German cup 2023. In September 2024, Aalborg Håndbold announced the signing of Knorr, and he joined the club ahead of the 2025–26 season. In his first season, he won the Danish Championship.

=== National team ===
With Germany he participated in the European Men's U-18 Handball Championship in 2018, and was awarded a place in the All-Star Team as the best left back. He made his debut for the senior national team in November 2020. At the 2023 World Men's Handball Championship in Poland and Sweden, Knorr played a key role for Germany, scoring 43 goals and helping the team reach the quarter-finals, where they finished fifth overall. His performance earned him the Best Young Player award. Knorr impressed at the 2024 European Championship held in Germany, scoring a total of 50 goals as Germany reached the semi-final. This earned him an inclusion in the All-Star Team as the best centre back. At the 2024 Summer Olympics in Paris, Knorr contributed significantly to Germany's silver medal finish, scoring 36 goals and earning a place on the All-Star Team as the best centre back.

At the 2026 European Men's Handball Championship he won silver medals, losing to Denmark in the final.

== Individual awards ==
- All-Star centre back of the Olympic Games: 2024
- Best young player of the World Championship: 2023
- All-Star centre back of the European Championship: 2024
