= Felix Claar =

Swedish handball player (born 1997)

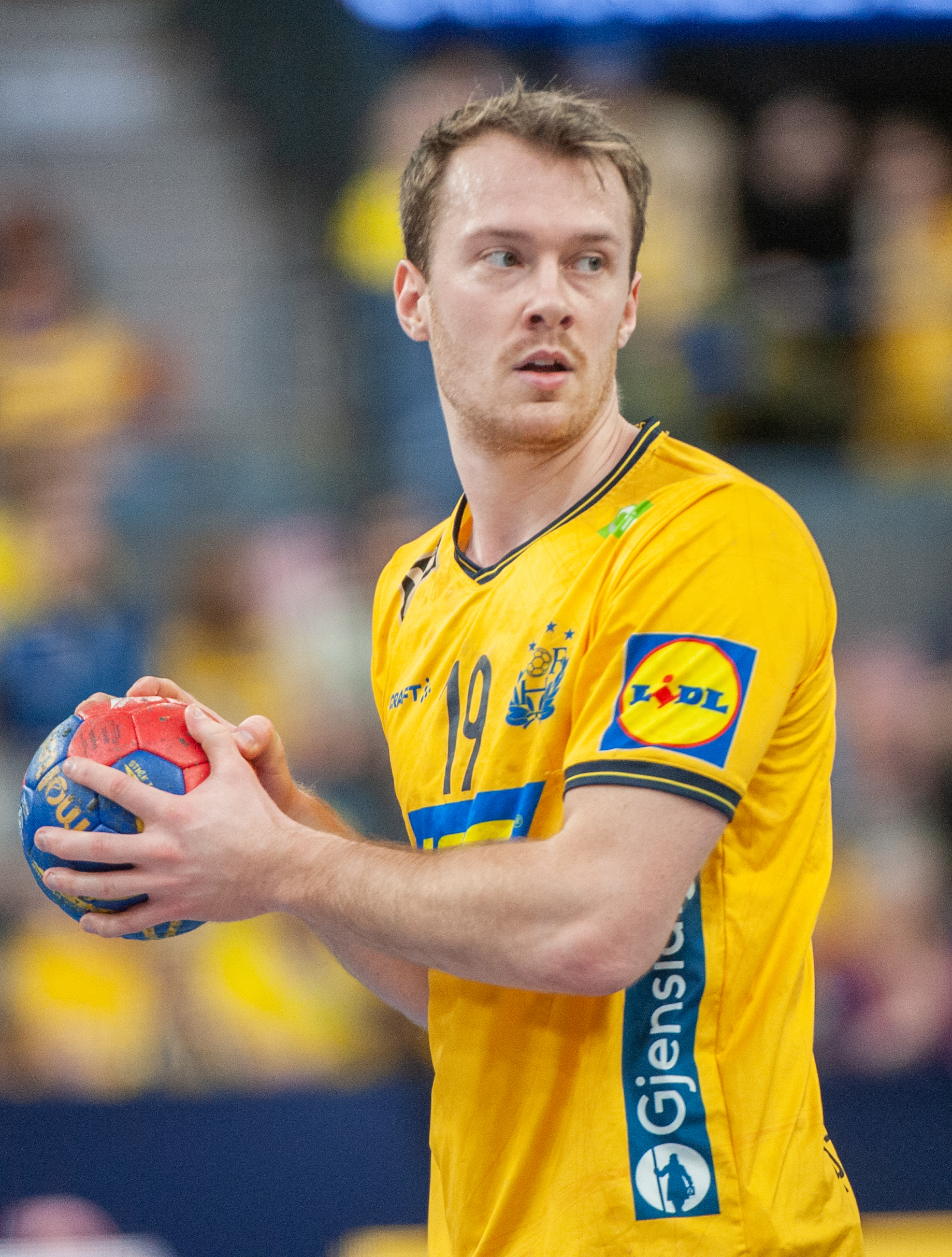
- Claar in 2023

Personal information
- Full name: Felix Niklas Claar
- Nationality: Swedish
- Born: 5 January 1997 (age 29) Norrköping, Sweden
- Height: 1.92 m (6 ft 4 in)

Sport
- Sport: Handball
- Position: Centre back
- Current club: SC Magdeburg
- Number: 7

Youth career
- Years: Team
- 2013–2020: Alingsås HK

Senior clubs
- Years: Team
- 2013–2020: Alingsås HK
- 2020–2023: Aalborg Håndbold
- 2023–: SC Magdeburg
National team
Years	Team	Apps	(Gls)
2017–	Sweden	84	(236)
Medal record
World Championship
Silver medal – second place	2021 Egypt
European Championship
Gold medal – first place	2022 Hungary/Slovakia
Bronze medal – third place	2024 Germany
- Updated on 14 January 2026

Felix Niklas Claar (born 5 January 1997) is a Swedish handball player for SC Magdeburg and the Swedish national team. He has won nine titles at club level playing for teams in Sweden, Denmark and Germany.

Claar made his international debut on the Swedish national team in June 2017 in a match against Poland. With the national team, he won the 2022 European Championship, finished second at the 2021 World Championship, and placed third at the 2024 European Championship.

== Career ==
Claar began playing handball in his hometown club Norrköping HK. In 2013 he joined Alingsås HK. At the age of 16 he made his senior debut in the Elitserien. In his first season he won the Swedish Championship.

In the summer of 2020 he joined the Danish reigning champions Aalborg Håndbold. In his first season at the club, he reached the Champions League final, where Aalborg lost to FC Barcelona 23-36. Only days later he won the Danish Championship final. In this match he was the topscorer with 9 goals.

In the 2021/2022 he was in the Danish league all star team.

For the 23/24 season he joined German Bundesliga side SC Magdeburg on a three year contract. In his first season at the club, he won both the DHB-Pokal and the German Championship.

Having played for most Swedish youth teams, Claar debuted for the Swedish national team on June 8th 2017 in a match against Poland. His first major tournament was the 2021 World Cup in Egypt. Here he reached the final, where Sweden lost to Denmark.

== Honours ==
=== Club ===
- Danish Handball League:
  - Winner: 2021
  - Runner-up: 2022, 2023
- EHF Champions League:
  - Winner:2025
  - Runner-up: 2021
- IHF Super Globe:
  - Winner: 2023
  - Bronze medal: 2021
- Handball-Bundesliga:
  - Winner: 2024,2026
- DHB-Pokal:
  - Winner: 2024
- Danish Handball Cup:
  - Winner: 2021
  - Runner-up: 2020
- Danish Super Cup:
  - Winner: 2020, 2021, 2022
- Handbollsligan:
  - Winner: 2014
  - Runner-up: 2019

=== International ===
- World Men's Handball Championship:
  - Silver: 2021
- European Men's Handball Championship:
  - Gold: 2022
  - Bronze: 2024

=== Individual ===
- EHF Excellence Awards: Left Back of the Season 2024/25
- EHF Excellence Awards: Centre Back of the Season 2023/24
- Swedish Handballer of the Year: 2024
- All-Star Team Danish League: 2021–22
- All-Star Team Handbollsligan: 2019–20
- Most valuable player (MVP) of the Handbollsligan: 2018–19, 2019–20
- Årets komet: 2016
