= IHF Emerging Nations Championship =

Men's Handball Tournament

- Current season, competition or edition: 2025 IHF Emerging Nations Championship
- Sport: Handball
- Founded: 2015; 11 years ago
- No. of teams: 16
- Most recent champion: Great Britain (1st title)
- Most titles: Faroe Islands (2 titles)

The IHF Emerging Nations Championship is a men's handball tournament organized by the International Handball Federation since 2015, directed to play with emerging teams. Its first edition was held in Kosovo from June 20 to 26.

Countries that currently participate are those in the “Four-year plan” of the European Handball Federation and the best ranked countries from other continents that did not qualify for the World Men's Handball Championship.

Of the teams that competed in the Emerging Nations Championship, three would later go on to play in the European Men's Handball Championship: Faroe Islands, Georgia, and Latvia. Two went on to play in the World Men's Handball Championship: Uruguay and United States (the latter on a wildcard).

== Tournaments ==
Year	Host country	Gold medal game			Bronze medal game		
Year	Host country	Gold	Score	Silver	Bronze	Score	Fourth place
2015	Kosovo	Faroe Islands	27–24	Latvia	Kosovo	28–16	Uruguay
2017	Bulgaria	Faroe Islands	26–25	Turkey	Kosovo	32–25	Cyprus
2019	(Georgia (country)); Georgia	Georgia	31–21	Cuba	Bulgaria	47–31	Great Britain
2021		Cancelled due to the COVID-19 pandemic			Cancelled due to the COVID-19 pandemic		
2023	Bulgaria	Cuba	28–18	Cyprus	Bulgaria	47–18	India
2025	Bulgaria	Great Britain	29–25	Bulgaria	United States	31–28	Nigeria

== Medal count ==
Rank	Nation	Gold	Silver	Bronze	Total
1	Faroe Islands	2	0	0	2
2	Cuba	1	1	0	2
3	Georgia	1	0	0	1
3	Great Britain	1	0	0	1
5	Bulgaria	0	1	2	3
6	Cyprus	0	1	0	1
6	Latvia	0	1	0	1
6	Turkey	0	1	0	1
9	Kosovo	0	0	2	2
10	United States	0	0	1	1
Totals (10 entries)		5	5	5	15

== Participation details ==
Team	(Kosovo) 2015	(Bulgaria) 2017	(Georgia (country)) 2019	(Bulgaria) 2023	(Bulgaria) 2025	Total
Albania	14th	15th				2
Andorra	15th	14th		8th		3
Armenia	16th	16th				2
Australia	12th			6th		2
Azerbaijan		10th	10th	12th	8th	4
Bulgaria	11th	5th	3rd	3rd	2nd	5
Cameroon	7th					1
China	10th	6th	6th			3
Colombia			8th			1
Cuba			2nd	1st		2
Cyprus		4th		2nd	6th	3
Estonia	5th					1
Faroe Islands	1st	1st				2
Georgia		8th	1st			2
Great Britain	9th	11th	4th	5th	1st	5
Guatemala				10th		1
India			9th	4th		2
Ireland	13th	12th	11th			3
Kosovo	3rd	3rd				2
Latvia	2nd					1
Luxembourg		7th				1
Malta	8th	13th	12th	11th		4
Moldova	6th	9th		9th	7th	4
Nigeria			7th	7th	4th	3
Paraguay					5th	1
Turkey		2nd				1
United States			5th		3rd	2
Uruguay	4th					1
Total	16	16	12	12	8	

== See also ==
- IHF Inter-Continental Trophy
