= Georgian National Handball Federation =

Governing body of handball in Georgia

Georgian National Handball Federation Georgian: საქართველოს ხელბურთის ფედერაცია GNHF
- IOC nation: Georgia (GEO)
- Sport: Handball
- Other sports: Beach handball; Wheelchair handball
- Official website: www.geohandball.ge

HISTORY
- Year of formation: 1956; 70 years ago

AFFILIATIONS
- International federation: International Handball Federation (IHF)
- IHF member since: 1992
- Continental association: European Handball Federation
- National Olympic Committee: Georgian National Olympic Committee

GOVERNING BODY
- President: Vakhtang Meipariani
- Address: University Str. 15a, 0186 Tbilisi
- Country: Georgia (Georgia (country))

The Georgian National Handball Federation (Georgian: საქართველოს ხელბურთის ფედერაცია) (GNHF) is the administrative and controlling body for handball and beach handball in Georgia. Founded in 1956, GNHF is a member of European Handball Federation (EHF) and the International Handball Federation (IHF).

== National teams ==
- Georgia men's national handball team
- Georgia men's national junior handball team
- Georgia women's national handball team

== Competitions hosted ==
GNHF had hosted following international championships:

Championship	Venue
2022 Women's Youth World Handball Championship	TBD
2019 IHF Emerging Nations Championship	Tbilisi
2017 Men's Youth World Handball Championship	Tbilisi
