= Georgia men's national handball team =

Georgia

Information
- Association: Georgian National Handball Federation (GNHF) საქართველოს ხელბურთის ფედერაცია
- Coach: Rubén Garabaya
- Assistant coach: Shota Tevzadze

Colours
1st	2nd

Results

European Championship
- Appearances: 2 (First in 2024)
- Best result: 18th (2024)
- Last updated on Unknown.

The Georgia national handball team is the national team of Georgia. It takes part in international team handball competitions.

== Competitive record ==
=== World Championships ===
World Championship record
Year	Round	Position	GP	W	D	L	GS	GA
(Sweden) 1993	did not qualify							
(Iceland) 1995	did not qualify							
(Japan) 1997	did not qualify							
(Egypt) 1999	did not qualify							
(France) 2001	did not qualify							
(Portugal) 2003	did not qualify							
(Tunisia) 2005	did not qualify							
(Germany) 2007	did not qualify							
(Croatia) 2009	did not qualify							
(Sweden) 2011	did not qualify							
(Spain) 2013	did not qualify							
(Qatar) 2015	did not qualify							
(France) 2017	did not qualify							
(Denmark) / (Germany) 2019	did not qualify							
(Egypt) 2021	did not qualify							
(Poland) / (Sweden) 2023	did not qualify							
(Croatia) / (Denmark) / (Norway) 2025	did not qualify							
(Germany) 2027	did not qualify							
(France) / (Germany) 2029	to be determined							
(Denmark) / (Iceland) / (Norway) 2031	to be determined							
Total	0/20	–	0	0	0	0	0	0

=== European Championship ===
European Championship record
Year	Round	Position	GP	W	D	L	GS	GA
(Portugal) 1994	Did not qualify							
(Spain) 1996	Did not qualify							
(Italy) 1998	Did not qualify							
(Croatia) 2000	Did not qualify							
(Sweden) 2002	Did not qualify							
(Slovenia) 2004	Did not qualify							
(Switzerland) 2006	Did not qualify							
(Norway) 2008	Did not qualify							
(Austria) 2010	Did not qualify							
(Serbia) 2012	Did not qualify							
(Denmark) 2014	Did not qualify							
(Poland) 2016	Did not qualify							
(Croatia) 2018	Did not qualify							
(Austria) (Norway) (Sweden) 2020	Did not qualify							
(Hungary) (Slovakia) 2022	Did not qualify							
(Germany) 2024	Preliminary round	18th	3	1	0	2	77	95
(Denmark) (Norway) (Sweden) 2026	Preliminary round	20th	3	0	0	3	84	101
(Portugal) (Spain) (Switzerland) 2028	To be determined							
(Czech Republic) (Denmark) (Poland) 2030	To be determined							
(France) (Germany) 2032	To be determined							
Total	2/20	–	6	1	0	5	161	196

=== Challenge Trophy ===
Year	Round	W	L	D	place
2007	Challenge Trophy	4	0	0	I
2009	Challenge Trophy	3	1	0	II
2012	Challenge Trophy	2	1	0	II

=== IHF Emerging Nations Championship ===
- 2017 – 8th place
- 2019 – 1st place
- 2021 – 1st place

== Current squad ==
Roster for the 2026 European Men's Handball Championship.

Head coach: Tite Kalandadze

No.	Pos.	Name	Date of birth (age)	Height	App.	Goals	Club
1	GK	Gigi Rukhadze	15 March 2004 (age 22)	1.85 m	0	0	(Croatia) RK Bjelovar
3	P	George Lapiashvili	12 November 2000 (age 25)	1.95 m	22	13	(Georgia (country)) B.S.B. Batumi
5	LW	Vakhtang Khelisupali	13 January 2005 (age 21)	1.90 m	2	2	(Georgia (country)) Mimi Samtredia Tbilisi
7	LW	Khazein Rustamov	9 December 1998 (age 27)	1.80 m	34	51	(Romania) CSM Constanța
8	RB	Vakhtang Kharebashvili	19 October 2008 (age 18)	1.90 m	3	0	(Lithuania) Dragūnas Klaipėda
9	CB	Giorgi Areshidze	23 July 2004 (age 22)	1.90 m	4	4	(Georgia (country)) HC Pegasi
10	CB	Irakli Kbilashvili	2 October 1998 (age 28)	1.89 m	38	122	(Romania) AHC Potaissa Turda
11	RB	Giorgi Tskhovrebadze	19 February 2001 (age 25)	1.94 m	33	237	(Croatia) RK Zagreb
12	GK	Zurab Tsintsadze	3 October 1996 (age 30)	1.85 m	28	5	(Poland) KPR Legionowo
18	P	Erekle Arsenashvili	18 October 1998 (age 28)	1.97 m	32	105	(France) Tremblay Handball
24	RB	Zurab Gogava	14 September 1998 (age 28)	1.96 m	16	2	(Germany) TBV Lemgo
27	LB	Nikoloz Kalandadze	27 July 2002 (age 24)	1.98 m	14	35	(France) Chambéry Savoie Mont-Blanc Handball
28	LB	Davit Grishikashvili	25 June 2007 (age 19)	1.98 m	0	0	(North Macedonia) HC Butel Skopje
34	LB	Miriani Gavashelishvili	21 September 2000 (age 26)	1.97 m	26	11	(Poland) KPR Ostrovia Ostrów Wielkopolski
71	RW	Giorgi Dikhaminjia	21 June 1997 (age 29)	1.88 m	44	101	(Iceland) KA Handball
87	GK	David Nikabadze	16 June 1999 (age 27)	1.99 m	16	1	(Russia) SGAU Saratov

== Georgia vs opponent (Not friendly match) ==
Opponent	Wins	Losses	Draws
Armenia	2		
Austria	1	6	
Azerbaijan	4		
Belarus	2		
Belgium		1	1
Bosnia and Herzegovina	3	2	
Bulgaria	3	1	
China		1	
Cuba	1		
Cyprus	2	2	
Denmark		2	
England	1		
Estonia	1	2	1
Faroe Islands		1	
Finland	2	9	4
Great Britain	3		
Greece	1	3	
Hungary	1	3	
Iceland		2	
Ireland	2		
Israel	1	4	1
Italy	1	5	
Kosovo		1	
Latvia	2	4	
Lithuania	2	7	
Luxembourg	2	5	
Malta	3		
Moldova	3		
Netherlands	1	2	
Nigeria	1		
Norway		3	
Portugal	1	2	
Romania		3	
Slovenia		2	
Slovakia	1	1	
Sweden		2	
Switzerland	1	5	
Turkey	1	6	
Ukraine		2	
United States	1		
40 Countries	50	88	7
