= Rutger ten Velde =

Dutch handball player (born 1997)

Rutger ten velde
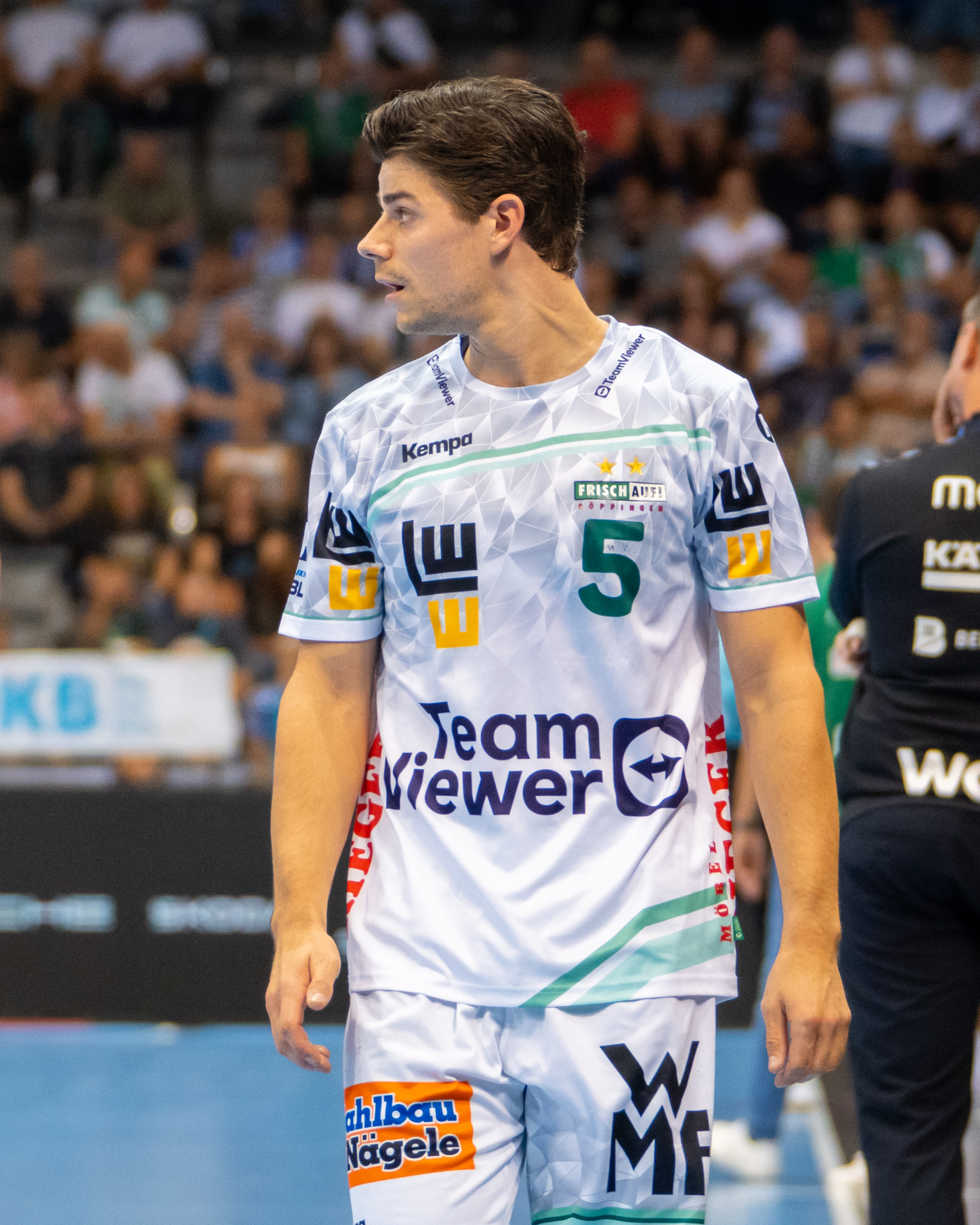

Personal information
- Nationality: Dutch
- Born: 5 March 1997 (age 29) Arnhem, Netherlands
- Height: 1.78 m (5 ft 10 in)

Sport
- Sport: Handball
- Position: Left wing
- Current club: Frisch Auf Göppingen

Senior clubs
- Years: Team
- 2014–2015: RKHV Volendam
- 2015–2016: HS Gummersbach/Derschlag
- 2016–2017: RKHV Volendam
- 2017–2021: Wilhelmshavener HV
- 2021–2022: TuS Ferndorf
- 2022–2024: TuS N-Lübbecke
- 2024–: Frisch Auf Göppingen
National team
| Years | Team | Apps | (Gls) |
| 2017– | Netherlands | 71 | (219) |
- Updated on 2 January 2025

Rutger ten velde (born 5 March 1997) is a Dutch handball player for the German team TuS N-Lübbecke and the Dutch national team.

He represented the Netherlands at the 2022 European Men's Handball Championship. Ten Velde finished the 2024 European Men's Handball Championship as fifth on the overall top scorer list with 45 goals during the tournament.

After the event the German Bundesliga team Frisch Auf! Göppingen announced that Ten Velde has signed for two seasons starting from the 2024/2025 season.
