= Moldova men's national handball team =

Moldova

Information
- Association: Handball Federation of Moldova
- Coach: Nicolae Vizitiu

Colours
1st	2nd

Results

IHF Emerging Nations Championship
- Appearances: 2 (First in 2015)
- Best result: 6th (2015)
- Last updated on Unknown.

The Moldova national handball team is the national handball team of Moldova, representing the country in international matches. It is controlled by the Handball Federation of Moldova.

== IHF Emerging Nations Championship record ==
- 2015 – 6th place
- 2017 – 9th place
- 2023 – 9th place
- 2025 – 7th place
