= Giorgi Tskhovrebadze (handballer) =

Georgian handball player

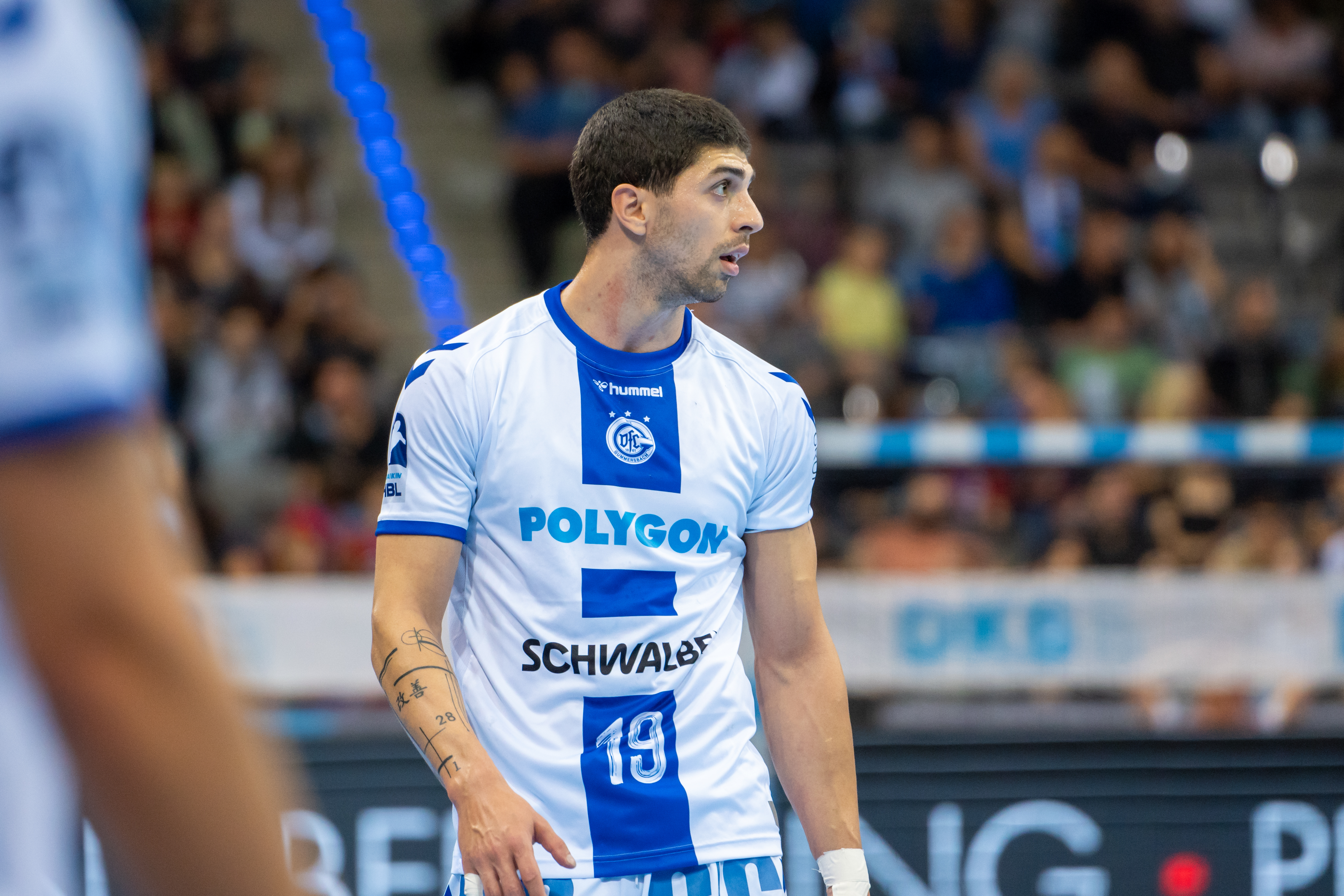

Personal information
- Nationality: Georgian
- Born: 19 February 2001 (age 25) Tbilisi, Georgia
- Height: 1.94 m (6 ft 4 in)

Sport
- Sport: Handball
- Position: Right back
- Current club: RK Zagreb
- Number: 11

Youth career
- Years: Team
- -2017: Tiflis
- 2017-2019: Montpellier Handball

Senior clubs
- Years: Team
- 2019–2023: Montpellier Handball
- 2021–2022: → Pfadi Winterthur (loan)
- 2023–2025: VfL Gummersbach
- 2025–: RK Zagreb
National team
Years	Team	Apps	(Gls)
–	Georgia	56	(396)
- Updated on 15 January 2026

Giorgi Tskhovrebadze (born 19 February 2001) is a Georgian handball player for RK Zagreb and the Georgian national team.
