= 2010 European Men's Handball Championship qualification =

This page describes the qualifying procedure for the 2010 European Men's Handball Championship.

The 2010 European Men's Handball Championship qualification matches took place from October 2008 to June 2009. In a new format approved by the European Handball Federation (EHF), only Austria (host nation) and Denmark (defending champion) qualified automatically for the final tournament, while all other national teams had to play the qualification round to reach the European Championship.

== Qualification system ==
For the 2010 European Championship, a new qualification system was used for the first time, following its approval by the European Handball Federation (EHF) at its 9th extraordinary congress, in Lillehammer, Norway, on January 26, 2008. Under this new system, all participating national teams, except the host country and defending champion teams, had to play the qualification round in order to reach the final round tournament.

Sixteen teams were to participate in the final tournament in Austria, whose team qualified directly by virtue of being the host nation, along with Denmark, the 2008 champion. From EHF's 50 member federations, 38 had initially registered for the qualification matches, but with the withdrawal of Georgia and Moldova, only 36 teams played for the 14 final places still available. These teams were drawn into six groups of five teams and one group of six teams. Each team played twice against all the other teams in its group, in a home-and-away basis, and at the completion of all matches, the top two teams from each group qualify for the final tournament.

=== Seeding ===
The draw for the qualification round was held on April 18, 2008, during the EHF Competitions Conference, in Vienna. Teams were allocated to several pots according to EHF's national team ranking, and were successfully drawn so that each qualification group contained one team from each pot. Teams ranked 1–4 were drawn into one of the five-team groups.

Pot 1	Pot 2	Pot 3	Pot 4	Pot 5	Pot 6
France; Germany; Croatia; Spain; Poland; Russia; Iceland	Slovenia; Norway; Hungary; Sweden; Serbia; Czech Republic; Ukraine	Slovakia; Switzerland; Portugal; Belarus; Romania; Lithuania; Macedonia	Greece; Bosnia and Herzegovina; Latvia; Netherlands; Israel; Montenegro; Estonia	Finland; Bulgaria; Italy; Turkey; Belgium; Cyprus; Luxembourg	Georgia; Moldova; Faroe Islands

Austria are already assured of places at Euro 2010 as host nations.

Note

Georgia and Moldova registered for participation in the qualification matches and were drawn into Group 1 and Group 3, respectively, but ended up withdrawing from the qualification.

== Tiebreakers ==
If two or more teams are equal on points on completion of the group matches, the following criteria are applied to determine the rankings.

1. Higher number of points obtained in the group matches played among the teams in question.
2. Superior goal difference from the group matches played among the teams in question.
3. Higher number of goals scored in the group matches played among the teams in question.
4. If, after applying criteria 1) to 3) to several teams, two or more teams still have an equal ranking, the criteria 1) to 3) will be reapplied to determine the ranking of these teams. If this procedure does not lead to a decision, criteria 5), 6) and 7) will apply.
5. Superior goal difference from all group matches played.
6. Higher number of goals scored in all group matches played.
7. Drawing of lots.

== Summary ==
Below is a table containing all seven qualifying groups. Teams that have secured a place in the final tournament are highlighted in green. The order of teams is by final group position.

Group 1	Group 2	Group 3	Group 4	Group 5	Group 6	Group 7
Sweden; Poland	Russia; Serbia	Iceland; Norway	Croatia; Hungary	Germany; Slovenia	France; Czech Republic	Spain; Ukraine
Montenegro; Romania; Turkey	Bosnia and Herzegovina; Switzerland; Italy; Faroe Islands	Macedonia; Estonia; Belgium	Slovakia; Greece; Finland	Belarus; Israel; Bulgaria	Portugal; Latvia; Luxembourg	Netherlands; Lithuania; Cyprus

== Groups ==
The qualifying process started in October 2008. Austria was granted places in the tournament finals as host nations.

The draw for the qualification round defined the groups shown below. A provisional match schedule was elaborated and distributed to all national federations taking part in this round, and following negotiations a final schedule was approved. The qualification matches began on October 29, 2008, and ended on June 21, 2009.

Key:

- Teams highlighted in green qualified for the finals.

=== Group 1 ===
Pos	Team	Pld	W	D	L	GF	GA	GD	Pts	Qualification	SWE	POL	MNE	ROM	TUR
1	Sweden	8	6	2	0	251	200	+51	14	Final tournament	—	27–24	29–24	26–26	42–18
2	Poland	8	5	1	2	242	198	+44	11	Final tournament	32–32	—	30–20	34–22	32–21
3	Montenegro	8	4	0	4	229	240	−11	8		29–33	23–31	—	35–33	33–26
4	Romania	8	3	1	4	242	247	−5	7		29–36	33–29	27–28	—	37–30
5	Turkey	8	0	0	8	193	272	−79	0		18–26	20–30	31–37	29–35	—

=== Group 2 ===
Pos	Team	Pld	W	D	L	GF	GA	GD	Pts	Qualification	RUS	SRB	BIH	SUI	ITA	FRO
1	Russia	10	9	0	1	339	249	+90	18	Final tournament	—	35–31	37–25	35–29	38–19	37–16
2	Serbia	10	7	1	2	351	272	+79	15	Final tournament	35–29	—	28–23	35–27	48–24	39–20
3	Bosnia and Herzegovina	10	6	1	3	298	278	+20	13		23–29	31–28	—	34–23	31–28	45–28
4	Switzerland	10	4	1	5	295	288	+7	9		30–31	32–32	31–34	—	28–20	35–21
5	Italy	10	2	1	7	251	313	−62	5		23–34	31–34	25–25	23–30	—	30–23
6	Faroe Islands	10	0	0	10	212	346	−134	0		18–34	20–41	21–27	23–30	22–28	—

=== Group 3 ===
Pos	Team	Pld	W	D	L	GF	GA	GD	Pts	Qualification	ISL	NOR	MKD	EST	BEL
1	Iceland	8	5	3	0	264	212	+52	13	Final tournament	—	34–34	34–26	38–24	40–21
2	Norway	8	5	2	1	266	226	+40	12	Final tournament	31–31	—	36–30	31–23	35–24
3	Macedonia	8	4	1	3	231	223	+8	9		26–29	30–29	—	31–22	33–26
4	Estonia	8	2	2	4	213	238	−25	6		25–25	25–33	28–28	—	37–28
5	Belgium	8	0	0	8	196	271	−75	0		25–33	29–37	19–27	25–29	—

=== Group 4 ===
Pos	Team	Pld	W	D	L	GF	GA	GD	Pts	Qualification	CRO	HUN	SVK	GRE	FIN
1	Croatia	8	7	0	1	252	180	+72	14	Final tournament	—	26–25	34–21	32–20	39–20
2	Hungary	8	6	0	2	241	179	+62	12	Final tournament	30–28	—	29–30	32–19	34–15
3	Slovakia	8	4	0	4	214	215	−1	8		26–30	19–30	—	28–27	34–21
4	Greece	8	3	0	5	199	223	−24	6		24–29	21–27	27–24	—	31–26
5	Finland	8	0	0	8	159	268	−109	0		14–34	21–34	17–32	25–30	—

=== Group 5 ===
Pos	Team	Pld	W	D	L	GF	GA	GD	Pts	Qualification	GER	SLO	BLR	ISR	BUL
1	Germany	8	8	0	0	300	191	+109	16	Final tournament	—	38–30	38–27	36–24	42–11
2	Slovenia	8	6	0	2	293	221	+72	12	Final tournament	26–27	—	38–26	40–27	47–20
3	Belarus	8	4	0	4	253	233	+20	8		23–25	32–36	—	38–31	36–18
4	Israel	8	2	0	6	222	269	−47	4		21–40	28–36	28–31	—	29–20
5	Bulgaria	8	0	0	8	168	322	−154	0		29–54	23–40	19–40	28–34	—

=== Group 6 ===
Pos	Team	Pld	W	D	L	GF	GA	GD	Pts	Qualification	FRA	CZE	POR	LVA	LUX
1	France	8	6	0	2	251	192	+59	12	Final tournament	—	32–25	36–23	34–22	35–18
2	Czech Republic	8	6	0	2	255	221	+34	12	Final tournament	32–29	—	30–26	41–29	30–19
3	Portugal	8	5	0	3	234	229	+5	10		24–31	31–28	—	33–31	33–22
4	Latvia	8	3	0	5	227	249	−22	6		27–24	31–34	25–31	—	31–29
5	Luxembourg	8	0	0	8	182	258	−76	0		21–30	24–35	26–33	23–31	—

=== Group 7 ===
Pos	Team	Pld	W	D	L	GF	GA	GD	Pts	Qualification	ESP	UKR	NED	LTU	CYP
1	Spain	8	7	0	1	247	189	+58	14	Final tournament	—	30–21	32–29	31–21	32–20
2	Ukraine	8	5	0	3	205	192	+13	10	Final tournament	25–23	—	25–18	24–23	28–21
3	Netherlands	8	3	2	3	215	190	+25	8		26–35	24–19	—	25–25	40–16
4	Lithuania	8	3	2	3	194	194	0	8		22–28	30–25	19–19	—	26–22
5	Cyprus	8	0	0	8	166	262	−96	0		25–36	23–38	19–34	20–28	—

Notes on the tie-breaking situation:

- Netherlands and Lithuania are tied on their head-to-head records, and are thus ranked by their overall goal difference in the group:
  - Netherlands – 2 pts, 0GD, 0GF, 0 away goals (25–25 H vs Lithuania, 19–19 A vs Lithuania) – Overall GD = +25
  - Lithuania – 2 pts, 0GD, 0GF, 0 away goals (19–19 H vs Netherlands, 25–25 A vs Netherlands) – Overall GD = 0
