= 2010 European Men's Handball Championship qualification – Group 7 =

The qualification group 7 for the 2010 European Men's Handball Championship includes the national teams of Cyprus, Lithuania, Netherlands, Spain and Ukraine.

== Standings ==
Pos	Team	Pld	W	D	L	GF	GA	GD	Pts	Qualification	ESP	UKR	NED	LTU	CYP
1	Spain	8	7	0	1	247	189	+58	14	Final tournament	—	30–21	32–29	31–21	32–20
2	Ukraine	8	5	0	3	205	192	+13	10	Final tournament	25–23	—	25–18	24–23	28–21
3	Netherlands	8	3	2	3	215	190	+25	8		26–35	24–19	—	25–25	40–16
4	Lithuania	8	3	2	3	194	194	0	8		22–28	30–25	19–19	—	26–22
5	Cyprus	8	0	0	8	166	262	−96	0		25–36	23–38	19–34	20–28	—

== Fixtures and results ==
October 29, 2008; 20:00 CET	Spain	32:20	Cyprus	Pinto, Madrid; Attendance: 1,200; Referees: Santos, Fonseca (POR)
October 29, 2008; 20:00 CET	Rocas 7	(13:7)	Papakyprianou 4	Pinto, Madrid; Attendance: 1,200; Referees: Santos, Fonseca (POR)
October 29, 2008; 20:00 CET	2× (yellow card) 3× (suspension)	Report	2× (yellow card) 3× (suspension)	Pinto, Madrid; Attendance: 1,200; Referees: Santos, Fonseca (POR)

October 30, 2008; 20:30 CET	Netherlands	24:19	Ukraine	Sporthal Angelslo, Emmen; Attendance: 1,300; Referees: Hakansso, Nilsson (SWE)
October 30, 2008; 20:30 CET	Konitz 7	(14:10)	Nat 4	Sporthal Angelslo, Emmen; Attendance: 1,300; Referees: Hakansso, Nilsson (SWE)
October 30, 2008; 20:30 CET	2× (yellow card) 3× (suspension)	Report	3× (yellow card) 4× (suspension)	Sporthal Angelslo, Emmen; Attendance: 1,300; Referees: Hakansso, Nilsson (SWE)

November 1, 2008; 20:30 CET	Netherlands	40:16	Cyprus	Sporthal Angelslo, Emmen; Attendance: 1,000; Referees: Nybo, Poulsen (DEN)
November 1, 2008; 20:30 CET	Lochtenbergh 11	(17:4)	Papakyprianou 7	Sporthal Angelslo, Emmen; Attendance: 1,000; Referees: Nybo, Poulsen (DEN)
November 1, 2008; 20:30 CET	3× (yellow card) 4× (suspension)	Report	2× (yellow card) 5× (suspension) 1× (red card)	Sporthal Angelslo, Emmen; Attendance: 1,000; Referees: Nybo, Poulsen (DEN)

November 2, 2008; 17:00 CET	Ukraine	25:23	Spain	Citysporthall, Zaporizhzhia; Attendance: 2,000; Referees: Pavel, State (ROU)
November 2, 2008; 17:00 CET	Burka 7	(14:14)	Morros 8	Citysporthall, Zaporizhzhia; Attendance: 2,000; Referees: Pavel, State (ROU)
November 2, 2008; 17:00 CET	3× (yellow card) 4× (suspension)	Report	2× (yellow card) 1× (suspension)	Citysporthall, Zaporizhzhia; Attendance: 2,000; Referees: Pavel, State (ROU)

November 26, 2008; 19:00 CET	Cyprus	23:38	Ukraine	Gymnasio Platy, Nicosia; Attendance: 400; Referees: Nikolov, Nachevski (MKD)
November 26, 2008; 19:00 CET	Papakyprianou 11	(13:23)	Onufryienko, Shelmenko 8	Gymnasio Platy, Nicosia; Attendance: 400; Referees: Nikolov, Nachevski (MKD)
November 26, 2008; 19:00 CET	3× (yellow card) 5× (suspension)	Report	3× (yellow card) 5× (suspension)	Gymnasio Platy, Nicosia; Attendance: 400; Referees: Nikolov, Nachevski (MKD)

November 27, 2008; 17:00 CET	Lithuania	19:19	Netherlands	VSI "Rankinio Centras", Panevėžys; Attendance: 1,200; Referees: Hansen, Pettersen (NOR)
November 27, 2008; 17:00 CET	Grosas, Pauzuolis 4	(10:9)	Schmetz 6	VSI "Rankinio Centras", Panevėžys; Attendance: 1,200; Referees: Hansen, Pettersen (NOR)
November 27, 2008; 17:00 CET	3× (yellow card) 4× (suspension) 1× (red card)	Report	3× (yellow card) 2× (suspension)	VSI "Rankinio Centras", Panevėžys; Attendance: 1,200; Referees: Hansen, Pettersen (NOR)

November 30, 2008; 17:00 CET	Netherlands	25:25	Lithuania	Sporthal Angelslo, Emmen; Attendance: 1,600; Referees: Eliasson, Gudjonsson (ISL)
November 30, 2008; 17:00 CET	Schmetz 9	(15:12)	Novickis 7	Sporthal Angelslo, Emmen; Attendance: 1,600; Referees: Eliasson, Gudjonsson (ISL)
November 30, 2008; 17:00 CET	3× (yellow card) 7× (suspension) 1× (red card)	Report	3× (yellow card) 5× (suspension)	Sporthal Angelslo, Emmen; Attendance: 1,600; Referees: Eliasson, Gudjonsson (ISL)

November 30, 2008; 17:00 CET	Ukraine	28:21	Cyprus	Citysporthall, Zaporizhzhia; Attendance: 1,700; Referees: Yudchyts, Kot (BLR)
November 30, 2008; 17:00 CET	Doroshchuk 6	(12:13)	Efstathiadis 8	Citysporthall, Zaporizhzhia; Attendance: 1,700; Referees: Yudchyts, Kot (BLR)
November 30, 2008; 17:00 CET	3× (yellow card) 3× (suspension)	Report	3× (yellow card) 4× (suspension)	Citysporthall, Zaporizhzhia; Attendance: 1,700; Referees: Yudchyts, Kot (BLR)

March 18, 2009; 17:00 CET	Lithuania	22:28	Spain	Darius&Girenas Sporto Hale, Kaunas; Attendance: 2,300; Referees: Karlubik, Struhal
March 18, 2009; 17:00 CET	Stelmokas 4	(12:11)	Romero 7	Darius&Girenas Sporto Hale, Kaunas; Attendance: 2,300; Referees: Karlubik, Struhal
March 18, 2009; 17:00 CET	3× (yellow card) 7× (suspension)	Report	2× (yellow card) 3× (suspension)	Darius&Girenas Sporto Hale, Kaunas; Attendance: 2,300; Referees: Karlubik, Struhal

March 18, 2009; 19:00 CET	Cyprus	19:34	Netherlands	Cyprus College Athletic Centre, Nicosia; Attendance: 500; Referees: Sirbu, Suponicov (MDA)
March 18, 2009; 19:00 CET	Papakyprianou 8	(10:13)	Bult 15	Cyprus College Athletic Centre, Nicosia; Attendance: 500; Referees: Sirbu, Suponicov (MDA)
March 18, 2009; 19:00 CET	3× (yellow card) 4× (suspension)	Report	2× (yellow card) 4× (suspension)	Cyprus College Athletic Centre, Nicosia; Attendance: 500; Referees: Sirbu, Suponicov (MDA)

March 21, 2009; 17:00 CET	Cyprus	20:28	Lithuania	Cyprus College Athletic Centre, Nicosia; Attendance: 500; Referees: Stark, Stefan (ROU)
March 21, 2009; 17:00 CET	Papakyprianou 8	(8:13)	Rackauskas 7	Cyprus College Athletic Centre, Nicosia; Attendance: 500; Referees: Stark, Stefan (ROU)
March 21, 2009; 17:00 CET	3× (yellow card) 3× (suspension)	Report	3× (yellow card) 2× (suspension)	Cyprus College Athletic Centre, Nicosia; Attendance: 500; Referees: Stark, Stefan (ROU)

March 22, 2009; 14:00 CET	Netherlands	26:35	Spain	Topsportcentrum Rotterdam, Rotterdam; Attendance: 2,100; Referees: Buache, von Escher (SUI)
March 22, 2009; 14:00 CET	Klemann, Remer 5	(12:16)	Malmagro 8	Topsportcentrum Rotterdam, Rotterdam; Attendance: 2,100; Referees: Buache, von Escher (SUI)
March 22, 2009; 14:00 CET	3× (yellow card) 2× (suspension)	Report	2× (yellow card) 2× (suspension)	Topsportcentrum Rotterdam, Rotterdam; Attendance: 2,100; Referees: Buache, von Escher (SUI)

June 10, 2009; 18:00 CET	Ukraine	24:23	Lithuania	Palace of Sports Yunost, Zaporizhzhia; Attendance: 1,500; Referees: Sivak, Dvorsky (SVK)
June 10, 2009; 18:00 CET	Nat 9	(11:9)	Klimciauskas 10	Palace of Sports Yunost, Zaporizhzhia; Attendance: 1,500; Referees: Sivak, Dvorsky (SVK)
June 10, 2009; 18:00 CET	3× (yellow card) 5× (suspension) 1× (red card)	Report	3× (yellow card) 6× (suspension)	Palace of Sports Yunost, Zaporizhzhia; Attendance: 1,500; Referees: Sivak, Dvorsky (SVK)

June 10, 2009; 20:00 CET	Cyprus	25:36	Spain	Cyprus College Athletic Centre, Nicosia; Attendance: 200; Referees: Azemi, Beqiri (Kosovo)
June 10, 2009; 20:00 CET	Papakyprianou 6	(9:19)	Malmagro 11	Cyprus College Athletic Centre, Nicosia; Attendance: 200; Referees: Azemi, Beqiri (Kosovo)
June 10, 2009; 20:00 CET	3× (yellow card) 6× (suspension) 1× (red card)	Report	3× (yellow card) 3× (suspension)	Cyprus College Athletic Centre, Nicosia; Attendance: 200; Referees: Azemi, Beqiri (Kosovo)

June 13, 2009; 16:30 CET	Lithuania	26:22	Cyprus	Utena Sport Arena, Utena; Attendance: 900; Referees: Riga, Thomassen (BEL)
June 13, 2009; 16:30 CET	Strazdas 8	(15:9)	Demosthenous 6	Utena Sport Arena, Utena; Attendance: 900; Referees: Riga, Thomassen (BEL)
June 13, 2009; 16:30 CET	2× (yellow card) 3× (suspension)	Report	3× (yellow card) 5× (suspension)	Utena Sport Arena, Utena; Attendance: 900; Referees: Riga, Thomassen (BEL)

June 14, 2009; 18:00 CET	Spain	30:21	Ukraine	Vigo-Galicia; Attendance: 3,100; Referees: Hakansson, Nilsson (SWE)
June 14, 2009; 18:00 CET	Malmagro 8	(16:10)	Onufryienko 5	Vigo-Galicia; Attendance: 3,100; Referees: Hakansson, Nilsson (SWE)
June 14, 2009; 18:00 CET	3× (yellow card) 1× (suspension)	Report	3× (yellow card) 4× (suspension)	Vigo-Galicia; Attendance: 3,100; Referees: Hakansson, Nilsson (SWE)

June 17, 2009; 20:30 CET	Spain	31:21	Lithuania	Cangas del Morrazo-Galicia; Attendance: 2,500; Referees: Kohout, Novak (CZE)
June 17, 2009; 20:30 CET	Tomás 7	(15:9)	Sabonis 7	Cangas del Morrazo-Galicia; Attendance: 2,500; Referees: Kohout, Novak (CZE)
June 17, 2009; 20:30 CET	2× (yellow card) 3× (suspension)	Report	3× (yellow card) 4× (suspension)	Cangas del Morrazo-Galicia; Attendance: 2,500; Referees: Kohout, Novak (CZE)

June 18, 2009; 18:00 CET	Ukraine	25:18	Netherlands	Palace of Sports Yunost, Zaporizhzhia; Attendance: 2,000; Referees: Bebestos, Meimaridis (GRE)
June 18, 2009; 18:00 CET	Onufryienko 9	(16:9)	three players 3	Palace of Sports Yunost, Zaporizhzhia; Attendance: 2,000; Referees: Bebestos, Meimaridis (GRE)
June 18, 2009; 18:00 CET	3× (yellow card) 5× (suspension)	Report	3× (yellow card) 1× (suspension)	Palace of Sports Yunost, Zaporizhzhia; Attendance: 2,000; Referees: Bebestos, Meimaridis (GRE)

June 21, 2009; 15:30 CET	Lithuania	30:25	Ukraine	Šiauliai Arena, Šiauliai; Attendance: 800; Referees: Bashmak, Frolov (RUS)
June 21, 2009; 15:30 CET	Andriuska 10	(13:13)	Lyubchenko 10	Šiauliai Arena, Šiauliai; Attendance: 800; Referees: Bashmak, Frolov (RUS)
June 21, 2009; 15:30 CET	3× (yellow card) 4× (suspension)	Report	3× (yellow card) 3× (suspension)	Šiauliai Arena, Šiauliai; Attendance: 800; Referees: Bashmak, Frolov (RUS)

June 21, 2009; 18:00 CET	Spain	32:29	Netherlands	Pontevedera-Galicia; Attendance: 2,000; Referees: Vodopivec, Krasna (SLO)
June 21, 2009; 18:00 CET	Tomás 7	(19:11)	Bult 7	Pontevedera-Galicia; Attendance: 2,000; Referees: Vodopivec, Krasna (SLO)
June 21, 2009; 18:00 CET	2× (yellow card) 7× (suspension)	Report	3× (yellow card) 5× (suspension)	Pontevedera-Galicia; Attendance: 2,000; Referees: Vodopivec, Krasna (SLO)
