= 2010 European Men's Handball Championship qualification – Group 2 =

The Qualification Group 2 for the 2010 European Men's Handball Championship included the national teams of Bosnia and Herzegovina, Italy, Faroe Islands, Russia, Serbia and Switzerland.

== Standings ==
Pos	Team	Pld	W	D	L	GF	GA	GD	Pts	Qualification	RUS	SRB	BIH	SUI	ITA	FRO
1	Russia	10	9	0	1	339	249	+90	18	Final tournament	—	35–31	37–25	35–29	38–19	37–16
2	Serbia	10	7	1	2	351	272	+79	15	Final tournament	35–29	—	28–23	35–27	48–24	39–20
3	Bosnia and Herzegovina	10	6	1	3	298	278	+20	13		23–29	31–28	—	34–23	31–28	45–28
4	Switzerland	10	4	1	5	295	288	+7	9		30–31	32–32	31–34	—	28–20	35–21
5	Italy	10	2	1	7	251	313	−62	5		23–34	31–34	25–25	23–30	—	30–23
6	Faroe Islands	10	0	0	10	212	346	−134	0		18–34	20–41	21–27	23–30	22–28	—

== Fixtures and results ==
October 29, 2008; 17:00 CET	Russia	37:25	Bosnia and Herzegovina	Chekhov, Russia; Attendance: 2,000; Referees: Gousko & Repkin (Belarus)
October 29, 2008; 17:00 CET	Igropulo (8)	(17:13)	(5) Harmandić	Chekhov, Russia; Attendance: 2,000; Referees: Gousko & Repkin (Belarus)
October 29, 2008; 17:00 CET	3× (yellow card) 8× (suspension)	Report	2× (yellow card) 5× (suspension)	Chekhov, Russia; Attendance: 2,000; Referees: Gousko & Repkin (Belarus)

October 29, 2008; 19:00 CET	Faroe Islands	20:41	Serbia	Tórshavn, Faroe Islands; Attendance: 700; Referees: Stenrand & Birch (Denmark)
October 29, 2008; 19:00 CET	Hanusarson (5)	(9:21)	(6) Curuvija, Vujin	Tórshavn, Faroe Islands; Attendance: 700; Referees: Stenrand & Birch (Denmark)
October 29, 2008; 19:00 CET	3× (yellow card) 5× (suspension)	Report	3× (yellow card) 4× (suspension) 1× (red card)	Tórshavn, Faroe Islands; Attendance: 700; Referees: Stenrand & Birch (Denmark)

October 30, 2008; 19:00 CET	Italy	23:30	Switzerland	Brixen, Italy; Attendance: 400; Referees: Kostov & Kostov (Bulgaria)
October 30, 2008; 19:00 CET	Skatar (7)	(13:14)	(10) Liniger	Brixen, Italy; Attendance: 400; Referees: Kostov & Kostov (Bulgaria)
October 30, 2008; 19:00 CET	4× (yellow card) 4× (suspension) 1× (red card)	Report	3× (yellow card) 4× (suspension)	Brixen, Italy; Attendance: 400; Referees: Kostov & Kostov (Bulgaria)

November 1, 2008; 14:00 CET	Bosnia and Herzegovina	45:28	Faroe Islands	Sarajevo, Bosnia and Herzegovina; Attendance: 0 Referees: Chaskis & Tsakonas (Greece)
November 1, 2008; 14:00 CET	Toromanović (8)	(21:12)	(9) Hanusarson	Sarajevo, Bosnia and Herzegovina; Attendance: 0 Referees: Chaskis & Tsakonas (Greece)
November 1, 2008; 14:00 CET	3× (yellow card) 3× (suspension)	Report	3× (yellow card) 6× (suspension)	Sarajevo, Bosnia and Herzegovina; Attendance: 0 Referees: Chaskis & Tsakonas (Greece)

November 1, 2008; 19:30 CET	Switzerland	30:31	Russia	Aarau, Switzerland; Attendance: 2,200; Referees: Abrahamsen & Kristiansen (Norway)
November 1, 2008; 19:30 CET	Liniger (12)	(18:12)	(9) Rastvortsev	Aarau, Switzerland; Attendance: 2,200; Referees: Abrahamsen & Kristiansen (Norway)
November 1, 2008; 19:30 CET	3× (yellow card) 6× (suspension)	Report	3× (yellow card) 7× (suspension) 1× (red card)	Aarau, Switzerland; Attendance: 2,200; Referees: Abrahamsen & Kristiansen (Norway)

November 2, 2008; 19:00 CET	Serbia	48:24	Italy	Niš, Serbia; Attendance: 3,800; Referees: Horváth & Marton (Hungary)
November 2, 2008; 19:00 CET	Curuvija (8)	(21:10)	(5) Di Maggio	Niš, Serbia; Attendance: 3,800; Referees: Horváth & Marton (Hungary)
November 2, 2008; 19:00 CET	3× (yellow card) 1× (suspension)	Report	3× (yellow card) 3× (suspension)	Niš, Serbia; Attendance: 3,800; Referees: Horváth & Marton (Hungary)

November 26, 2008; 17:00 CET	Russia	37:16	Faroe Islands	Chekhov, Russia; Attendance: 1,500; Referees: Erdogan & Özdeniz (Turkey)
November 26, 2008; 17:00 CET	Dibirov (7)	(19:7)	(5) Kragesteen	Chekhov, Russia; Attendance: 1,500; Referees: Erdogan & Özdeniz (Turkey)
November 26, 2008; 17:00 CET	3× (yellow card) 2× (suspension)	Report	2× (yellow card) 1× (suspension)	Chekhov, Russia; Attendance: 1,500; Referees: Erdogan & Özdeniz (Turkey)

November 26, 2008; 19:30 CET	Switzerland	32:32	Serbia	Zurich, Switzerland; Attendance: 2,500; Referees: Dinu & Din (Romania)
November 26, 2008; 19:30 CET	Liniger (6)	(19:16)	(7) Vujin	Zurich, Switzerland; Attendance: 2,500; Referees: Dinu & Din (Romania)
November 26, 2008; 19:30 CET	3× (yellow card) 7× (suspension) 1× (red card)	Report	3× (yellow card) 4× (suspension)	Zurich, Switzerland; Attendance: 2,500; Referees: Dinu & Din (Romania)

November 27, 2008; 19:00 CET	Italy	25:25	Bosnia and Herzegovina	Siracusa, Italy; Attendance: 1,000; Referees: Pavel & State (Romania)
November 27, 2008; 19:00 CET	Ghionea (7)	(10:9)	(8) Terzic	Siracusa, Italy; Attendance: 1,000; Referees: Pavel & State (Romania)
November 27, 2008; 19:00 CET	4× (yellow card) 1× (suspension)	Report	4× (yellow card) 2× (suspension)	Siracusa, Italy; Attendance: 1,000; Referees: Pavel & State (Romania)

November 29, 2008; 20:00 CET	Bosnia and Herzegovina	34:23	Switzerland	Sarajevo, Bosnia and Herzegovina; Attendance: 1,200; Referees: Lazaar & Reveret (France)
November 29, 2008; 20:00 CET	Hajdarevic (8)	(16:12)	(5) Schmid	Sarajevo, Bosnia and Herzegovina; Attendance: 1,200; Referees: Lazaar & Reveret (France)
November 29, 2008; 20:00 CET	3× (yellow card) 6× (suspension)	Report	3× (yellow card) 4× (suspension)	Sarajevo, Bosnia and Herzegovina; Attendance: 1,200; Referees: Lazaar & Reveret (France)

November 30, 2008; 19:00 CET	Italy	30:23	Faroe Islands	Agrigento, Italy; Attendance: 700; Referees: Leyder & Jung (Luxembourg)
November 30, 2008; 19:00 CET	Maione (7)	(:)	(4) Olsen, Sörensen	Agrigento, Italy; Attendance: 700; Referees: Leyder & Jung (Luxembourg)
November 30, 2008; 19:00 CET		Report		Agrigento, Italy; Attendance: 700; Referees: Leyder & Jung (Luxembourg)

November 30, 2008; 19:00 CET	Serbia	35:29	Russia	Niš, Serbia; Attendance: 3,800; Referees: Kekes & Kekes (Hungary)
November 30, 2008; 19:00 CET	Ilić (10)	(:)	(6) Igropulo	Niš, Serbia; Attendance: 3,800; Referees: Kekes & Kekes (Hungary)
November 30, 2008; 19:00 CET		Report		Niš, Serbia; Attendance: 3,800; Referees: Kekes & Kekes (Hungary)

March 18, 2009; 19:00 CET	Faroe Islands	23:30	Switzerland	Tórshavn, Faroe Islands; Attendance: 300; Referees: Mäkinen & Jonsson (Sweden)
March 18, 2009; 19:00 CET	Hanusarson (5)	(:)	(11) Liniger	Tórshavn, Faroe Islands; Attendance: 300; Referees: Mäkinen & Jonsson (Sweden)
March 18, 2009; 19:00 CET		Report		Tórshavn, Faroe Islands; Attendance: 300; Referees: Mäkinen & Jonsson (Sweden)

March 18, 2009; 20:00 CET	Italy	23:34	Russia	Trieste, Italy; Attendance: 1,200; Referees: Cvetko & Kavalar (Slovenia)
March 18, 2009; 20:00 CET	Di Maggio (5)	(:)	(7) Filippov	Trieste, Italy; Attendance: 1,200; Referees: Cvetko & Kavalar (Slovenia)
March 18, 2009; 20:00 CET		Report		Trieste, Italy; Attendance: 1,200; Referees: Cvetko & Kavalar (Slovenia)

March 19, 2009; 20:00 CET	Bosnia and Herzegovina	31:28	Serbia	Sarajevo, Bosnia and Herzegovina; Attendance: 7,000; Referees: Brunovsky & Canda (Slovakia)
March 19, 2009; 20:00 CET	Stojanovic (6)	(:)	(7) Ilić	Sarajevo, Bosnia and Herzegovina; Attendance: 7,000; Referees: Brunovsky & Canda (Slovakia)
March 19, 2009; 20:00 CET		Report		Sarajevo, Bosnia and Herzegovina; Attendance: 7,000; Referees: Brunovsky & Canda (Slovakia)

March 21, 2009; 19:00 CET	Switzerland	35:21	Faroe Islands	Appenzell, Switzerland; Attendance: 1,100; Referees: Ersan & Akman (Turkey)
March 21, 2009; 19:00 CET	three players (6)	(:)	(8) Hanusarson	Appenzell, Switzerland; Attendance: 1,100; Referees: Ersan & Akman (Turkey)
March 21, 2009; 19:00 CET		Report		Appenzell, Switzerland; Attendance: 1,100; Referees: Ersan & Akman (Turkey)

March 22, 2009; 17:00 CET	Russia	38:19	Italy	Sport Hall "Olimpiyskiy" Chekhov, Chekhov, Russia; Attendance: 2,000; Referees: Katsikis & Michailidis (Greece)
March 22, 2009; 17:00 CET	Chernoivanov (5)	(:)	(4) Costanzo	Sport Hall "Olimpiyskiy" Chekhov, Chekhov, Russia; Attendance: 2,000; Referees: Katsikis & Michailidis (Greece)
March 22, 2009; 17:00 CET		Report		Sport Hall "Olimpiyskiy" Chekhov, Chekhov, Russia; Attendance: 2,000; Referees: Katsikis & Michailidis (Greece)

March 22, 2009; 19:00 CET	Serbia	28:23	Bosnia and Herzegovina	Niš, Serbia; Attendance: 3,800; Referees: Geipel & Helbig (Germany)
March 22, 2009; 19:00 CET	Ilić (13)	(:)	(5) Obradovic	Niš, Serbia; Attendance: 3,800; Referees: Geipel & Helbig (Germany)
March 22, 2009; 19:00 CET		Report		Niš, Serbia; Attendance: 3,800; Referees: Geipel & Helbig (Germany)

June 10, 2009; 13:00 CET	Faroe Islands	18:34	Russia	Tórshavn, Faroe Islands; Attendance: 400
June 10, 2009; 13:00 CET	S. Joensen (5)	(:)	(6) Predybailow	Tórshavn, Faroe Islands; Attendance: 400
June 10, 2009; 13:00 CET		Report		Tórshavn, Faroe Islands; Attendance: 400

June 10, 2009; 13:00 CET	Serbia	35:27	Switzerland	Zaječar, Serbia; Attendance: 2,300; Referees: Korres & Migas (Greece)
June 10, 2009; 13:00 CET	Bojinović (7)	(:)	(5) Schmid	Zaječar, Serbia; Attendance: 2,300; Referees: Korres & Migas (Greece)
June 10, 2009; 13:00 CET		Report		Zaječar, Serbia; Attendance: 2,300; Referees: Korres & Migas (Greece)

June 10, 2009; 13:00 CET	Bosnia and Herzegovina	31:28	Italy	Zenica, Bosnia and Herzegovina; Attendance: 4,000; Referees: A. Solodko & L. Solodko (Poland)
June 10, 2009; 13:00 CET	Stojanovic (8)	(:)	(7) Radovčić	Zenica, Bosnia and Herzegovina; Attendance: 4,000; Referees: A. Solodko & L. Solodko (Poland)
June 10, 2009; 13:00 CET		Report		Zenica, Bosnia and Herzegovina; Attendance: 4,000; Referees: A. Solodko & L. Solodko (Poland)

June 13, 2009; 16:00 CET	Switzerland	31:34	Bosnia and Herzegovina	Sursee, Switzerland; Attendance: 2,000; Referees: Dentz & Reibel (France)
June 13, 2009; 16:00 CET	Liniger (10)	(:)	(10) Terzić	Sursee, Switzerland; Attendance: 2,000; Referees: Dentz & Reibel (France)
June 13, 2009; 16:00 CET		Report		Sursee, Switzerland; Attendance: 2,000; Referees: Dentz & Reibel (France)

June 13, 2009; 16:00 CET	Faroe Islands	22:28	Italy	Tórshavn, Faroe Islands; Attendance: 200; Referees: Sitsi & Heinla (Estonia)
June 13, 2009; 16:00 CET	S. Joensen (8)	(:)	(7) Radovčić	Tórshavn, Faroe Islands; Attendance: 200; Referees: Sitsi & Heinla (Estonia)
June 13, 2009; 16:00 CET		Report		Tórshavn, Faroe Islands; Attendance: 200; Referees: Sitsi & Heinla (Estonia)

June 13, 2009; 16:00 CET	Russia	35:31	Serbia	Sport Hall "Olimpiyskiy" Chekhov, Chekhov, Russia; Attendance: 1,500; Referees: Buy & Pichon (France)
June 13, 2009; 16:00 CET	Ivanov (8)	(:)	(7) Bojinović	Sport Hall "Olimpiyskiy" Chekhov, Chekhov, Russia; Attendance: 1,500; Referees: Buy & Pichon (France)
June 13, 2009; 16:00 CET		Report		Sport Hall "Olimpiyskiy" Chekhov, Chekhov, Russia; Attendance: 1,500; Referees: Buy & Pichon (France)

June 17, 2009; 20:00 CET	Switzerland	28:20	Italy	Sursee, Switzerland; Attendance: 900; Referees: Pavićević & Ražnatović (Montenegro)
June 17, 2009; 20:00 CET	Schmid (6)	(:)	(4) Tarafino	Sursee, Switzerland; Attendance: 900; Referees: Pavićević & Ražnatović (Montenegro)
June 17, 2009; 20:00 CET		Report		Sursee, Switzerland; Attendance: 900; Referees: Pavićević & Ražnatović (Montenegro)

June 17, 2009; 20:00 CET	Serbia	39:20	Faroe Islands	Zaječar, Serbia; Attendance: 2,300; Referees: Shal (Ukraine) & Asgarov (Azerbaijan)
June 17, 2009; 20:00 CET	Vujin (6)	(:)	(4) S. Joensen, R. Joensen	Zaječar, Serbia; Attendance: 2,300; Referees: Shal (Ukraine) & Asgarov (Azerbaijan)
June 17, 2009; 20:00 CET		Report		Zaječar, Serbia; Attendance: 2,300; Referees: Shal (Ukraine) & Asgarov (Azerbaijan)

June 18, 2009; 20:00 CET	Bosnia and Herzegovina	23:29	Russia	Zenica, Bosnia and Herzegovina; Attendance: 3,000; Referees: Pedersen & Mortensen (Denmark)
June 18, 2009; 20:00 CET	three players (5)	(:)	(10) Dibirov	Zenica, Bosnia and Herzegovina; Attendance: 3,000; Referees: Pedersen & Mortensen (Denmark)
June 18, 2009; 20:00 CET		Report		Zenica, Bosnia and Herzegovina; Attendance: 3,000; Referees: Pedersen & Mortensen (Denmark)

June 20, 2009; 23:00 CET	Faroe Islands	21:27	Bosnia and Herzegovina	Tórshavn, Faroe Islands; Attendance: 500; Referees: Skruzny (Czech Republic)
June 20, 2009; 23:00 CET	S. Joensen (7)	(:)	(5) Halilbegović, Savić	Tórshavn, Faroe Islands; Attendance: 500; Referees: Skruzny (Czech Republic)
June 20, 2009; 23:00 CET		Report		Tórshavn, Faroe Islands; Attendance: 500; Referees: Skruzny (Czech Republic)

June 20, 2009; 23:00 CET	Italy	31:34	Serbia	Trieste, Italy; Attendance: 3,000; Referees: Kouz & Zhoba (Ukraine)
June 20, 2009; 23:00 CET	Radovčić (7)	(:)	three players (6)	Trieste, Italy; Attendance: 3,000; Referees: Kouz & Zhoba (Ukraine)
June 20, 2009; 23:00 CET		Report		Trieste, Italy; Attendance: 3,000; Referees: Kouz & Zhoba (Ukraine)

June 21, 2009; 23:00 CET	Russia	35:29	Switzerland	Chekhov, Russia; Attendance: 1,200; Referees: Cirligeanu & Bejinariu (Romania)
June 21, 2009; 23:00 CET	Chernoivanov (7)	(:)	(7) Kurth	Chekhov, Russia; Attendance: 1,200; Referees: Cirligeanu & Bejinariu (Romania)
June 21, 2009; 23:00 CET		Report		Chekhov, Russia; Attendance: 1,200; Referees: Cirligeanu & Bejinariu (Romania)
