= 2010 European Men's Handball Championship =

2010 edition of the European Men's Handball Championship

2010 EHF European Men's Handball Championship
Handball-Europameisterschaft 2010
- EHF Euro 2010 official logo

Tournament details
- Host country: Austria
- Venues: 5 (in 5 host cities)
- Dates: 19–31 January
- Teams: 16 (from 1 confederation)

Final positions
- Champions: France (2nd title)
- Runners-up: Croatia
- Third place: Iceland
- Fourth place: Poland

Tournament statistics
- Matches played: 47
- Goals scored: 2,690 (57.23 per match)
- Attendance: 285,400 (6,072 per match)
- Top scorers: Filip Jícha (CZE) (53 goals)

Awards
- Best player: Filip Jícha (CZE)

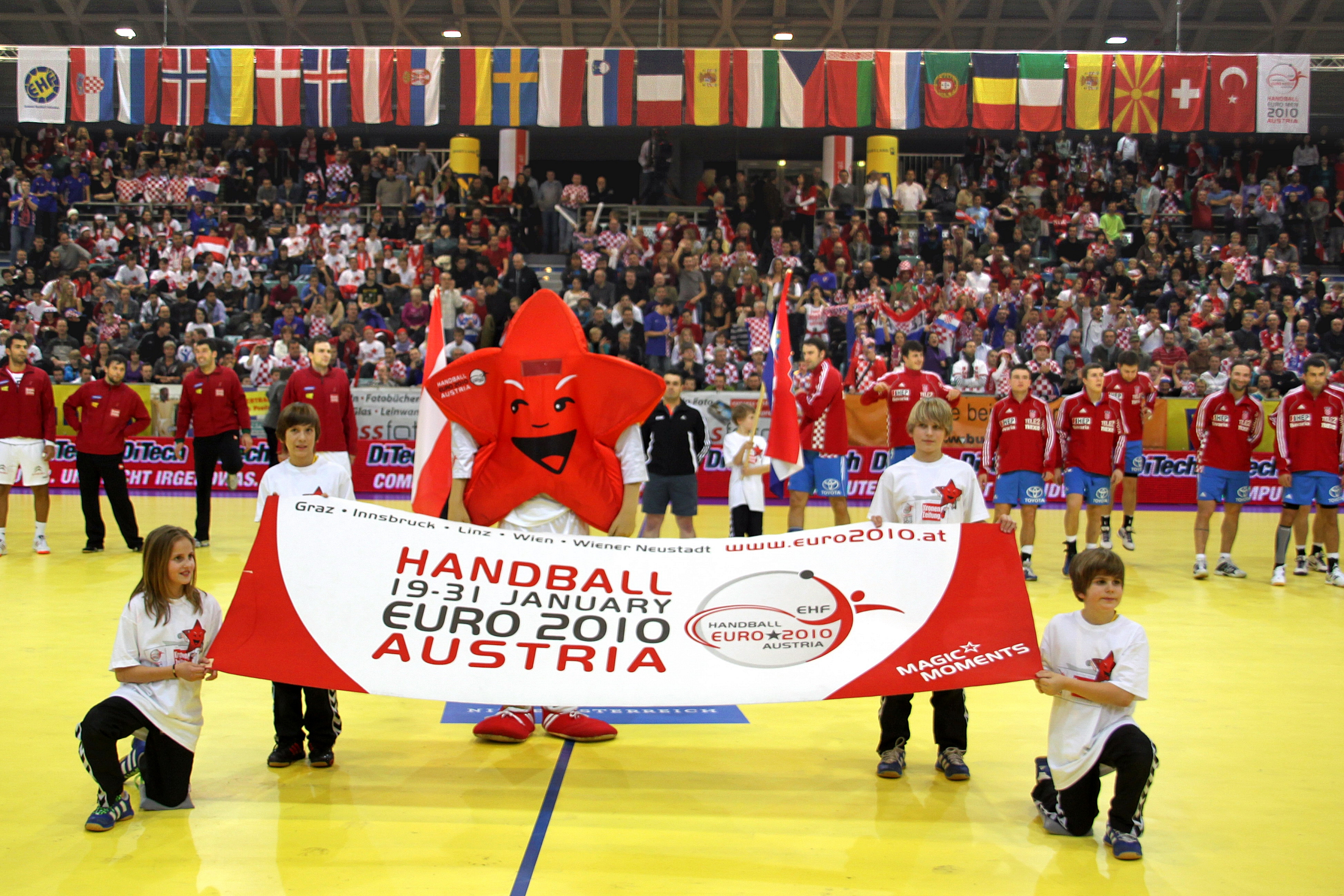
Logo and mascot of the 2010 European Men's Handball Championship

The 2010 EHF European Men's Handball Championship (9th tournament) was held in Austria from 19 to 31 January, in the cities of Vienna, Graz, Innsbruck, Linz and Wiener Neustadt.

France won the title after defeating Croatia in the final. Iceland captured the bronze medal, their first ever medal at the European Championship after defeating Poland. Defending champions Denmark finished 5th while the hosts Austria finished 9th.

== Bidding process ==
The two bids were as follows:

- Austria
- Greece

Outside of the two bids, the following bids were withdrawn:

- Germany
- Iceland
- Croatia
- (North Macedonia) Macedonia
- Hungary

On the 5 May 2006, in Vilamoura, Portugal, Austria was given the hosting rights for the first time ever. They were the first country since 1998 to host the tournament despite never qualifying on merit.

Voting results
Country
Country	Votes
Austria	28
Greece	18
Total	46

== Venues ==
5 Austrian cities have been selected to host the 2010 Championship. The venues in Linz, Graz and Wiener Neustadt were only used during the preliminary round. The fourth venue to be used in this round was located in Innsbruck, and was also one of the two venues in the main round. The other being Wiener Stadthalle in Vienna, which was the only venue to be used in the final round.

Vienna	Linz	Wiener Neustadt
Wiener Stadthalle; Capacity: 11,000	Intersport Arena; Capacity: 6,000	Arena Nova; Capacity: 5,000
Innsbruck	2010 European Men's Handball Championship is located in Austria	Graz
Olympiahalle; Capacity: 10,000	2010 European Men's Handball Championship is located in Austria	Stadthalle Graz; Capacity: 5,000

== Qualification ==
Qualification matches were played in 2008 and in 2009. For the first time, in qualification round all teams are included, except host Austria and defending champion Denmark. Teams were divided in 7 groups and top two teams from each group qualified to European Championship.

=== Qualified teams ===
Country	Qualified as	Date qualification was secured	Previous appearances in tournament^{1}
Austria	Host	5 May 2006	0 (debut)
Denmark	2008 EC winner	27 January 2008	7 (1994, 1996, 2000, 2002, 2004, 2006, **2008**)
Sweden	Group 1 winner	11 June 2009	7 (**1994**, 1996, **1998**, **2000**, **2002**, 2004, 2008)
Poland	Group 1 runner-up	20 June 2009	4 (2002, 2004, 2006, 2008)
Russia	Group 2 winner	18 June 2009	8 (1994, **1996**, 1998, 2000, 2002, 2004, 2006, 2008)
Serbia	Group 2 runner-up	18 June 2009	0 (debut)^{2}
Iceland	Group 3 winner	17 June 2009	5 (2000, 2002, 2004, 2006, 2008)
Norway	Group 3 runner-up	17 June 2009	3 (2000, 2006, 2008)
Croatia	Group 4 winner	17 June 2009	8 (1994, 1996, 1998, 2000, 2002, 2004, 2006, 2008)
Hungary	Group 4 runner-up	21 June 2009	6 (1994, 1996, 1998, 2004, 2006, 2008)
Germany	Group 5 winner	13 June 2009	8 (1994, 1996, 1998, 2000, 2002, **2004**, 2006, 2008)
Slovenia	Group 5 runner-up	21 June 2009	7 (1994, 1996, 2000, 2002, 2004, 2006, 2008)
France	Group 6 winner	17 June 2009	8 (1994, 1996, 1998, 2000, 2002, 2004, **2006**, 2008)
Czech Republic	Group 6 runner-up	17 June 2009	5 (1996, 1998, 2002, 2004, 2008)
Spain	Group 7 winner	17 June 2009	8 (1994, 1996, 1998, 2000, 2002, 2004, 2006, 2008)
Ukraine	Group 7 runner-up	18 June 2009	4 (2000, 2002, 2004, 2006)

^{1} Bold indicates champion for that year
^{2} Between 1996 and 2006, Serbia participated as FR Yugoslavia and Serbia and Montenegro.

== Seeding ==
The draw for the final tournament took place 19:00 CET on 24 June 2009 at the Liechtenstein Museum in Vienna.

Pot 1	Pot 2	Pot 3	Pot 4
Denmark; Croatia (assigned to A1); France; Germany (assigned to C1)	Sweden; Spain; Iceland; Russia	Austria (assigned to B3); Norway; Poland; Hungary (assigned to D3)	Slovenia; Czech Republic; Ukraine; Serbia

== Squads ==
Group A

- Croatia (squad)
- Norway (squad)
- Russia (squad)
- Ukraine (squad)

Group B

- Austria (squad)
- Denmark (squad)
- Iceland (squad)
- Serbia (squad)

Group C

- Germany (squad)
- Poland (squad)
- Slovenia (squad)
- Sweden (squad)

Group D

- Czech Republic (squad)
- France (squad)
- Hungary (squad)
- Spain (squad)

== Preliminary round ==
In the following tables:

- Pld = total games played
- W = total games won
- D = total games drawn (tied)
- L = total games lost
- GF = total goals scored (goals for)
- GA = total goals conceded (goals against)
- GD = goal difference (GF−GA)
- Pts = total points accumulated

The teams placed first, second and third (shaded in green) qualified to the main round.

=== Group A ===
Venue: Stadthalle, Graz

Team	Pld	W	D	L	GF	GA	GD	Pts
Croatia	3	3	0	0	83	76	+7	6
Norway	3	2	0	1	82	78	+4	4
Russia	3	1	0	2	89	91	−2	2
Ukraine	3	0	0	3	87	96	−9	0

All times are Central European Time (UTC+1)

19 January; 18:10	Russia	37–33	Ukraine	Attendance: 3,000; Referees: Cacador, Nicolau (POR)
19 January; 18:10	Igropulo 11	(21–16)	Burka, Onufriyenko 9	Attendance: 3,000; Referees: Cacador, Nicolau (POR)
19 January; 18:10	3× (yellow card) 3× (suspension)	Report	3× (yellow card) 4× (suspension)	Attendance: 3,000; Referees: Cacador, Nicolau (POR)

19 January; 20:10	Croatia	25–23	Norway	Attendance: 4,000; Referees: Muro, Rodriguez (ESP)
19 January; 20:10	Vuković 7	(11–10)	Tvedten 9	Attendance: 4,000; Referees: Muro, Rodriguez (ESP)
19 January; 20:10	4× (yellow card) 5× (suspension)	Report	3× (yellow card) 6× (suspension)	Attendance: 4,000; Referees: Muro, Rodriguez (ESP)

21 January; 18:10	Ukraine	25–28	Croatia	Attendance: 4,200; Referees: Canbro, Claesson (SWE)
21 January; 18:10	Onufriyenko 11	(14–12)	Vori 6	Attendance: 4,200; Referees: Canbro, Claesson (SWE)
21 January; 18:10	2× (yellow card) 4× (suspension)	Report	3× (yellow card) 4× (suspension)	Attendance: 4,200; Referees: Canbro, Claesson (SWE)

21 January; 20:10	Norway	28–24	Russia	Attendance: 4,200; Referees: Lazaar, Reveret (FRA)
21 January; 20:10	Kjelling 8	(16–13)	Kovalev, Rastvortsev 4	Attendance: 4,200; Referees: Lazaar, Reveret (FRA)
21 January; 20:10	3× (yellow card) 5× (suspension)	Report	3× (yellow card) 4× (suspension)	Attendance: 4,200; Referees: Lazaar, Reveret (FRA)

23 January; 18:10	Croatia	30–28	Russia	Attendance: 4,500; Referees: Methe, Methe (GER)
23 January; 18:10	Čupić 8	(17–16)	Igropulo 12	Attendance: 4,500; Referees: Methe, Methe (GER)
23 January; 18:10	3× (yellow card) 2× (suspension)	Report	3× (yellow card) 6× (suspension)	Attendance: 4,500; Referees: Methe, Methe (GER)

23 January; 20:10	Norway	31–29	Ukraine	Attendance: 3,500; Referees: Cacador, Nicolau (POR)
23 January; 20:10	Tvedten 8	(14–16)	Burka 7	Attendance: 3,500; Referees: Cacador, Nicolau (POR)
23 January; 20:10	3× (yellow card) 4× (suspension)	Report	4× (yellow card) 7× (suspension)	Attendance: 3,500; Referees: Cacador, Nicolau (POR)

=== Group B ===
Venue: Intersport Arena, Linz

Team	Pld	W	D	L	GF	GA	GD	Pts
Iceland	3	1	2	0	93	88	+5	4
Denmark	3	2	0	1	83	79	+4	4
Austria	3	1	1	1	103	101	+2	3
Serbia	3	0	1	2	83	94	−11	1

All times are Central European Time (UTC+1)

19 January; 18:00	Denmark	33–29	Austria	Attendance: 5,500; Referees: Lazaar, Reveret (FRA)
19 January; 18:00	Mogensen 7	(17–15)	Ziura 7	Attendance: 5,500; Referees: Lazaar, Reveret (FRA)
19 January; 18:00	3× (yellow card) 3× (suspension)	Report	3× (yellow card) 3× (suspension)	Attendance: 5,500; Referees: Lazaar, Reveret (FRA)

19 January; 20:15	Iceland	29–29	Serbia	Attendance: 5,000; Referees: Methe, Methe (GER)
19 January; 20:15	Sigurðsson 9	(15–11)	Ilić 7	Attendance: 5,000; Referees: Methe, Methe (GER)
19 January; 20:15	3× (yellow card) 5× (suspension)	Report	3× (yellow card) 6× (suspension)	Attendance: 5,000; Referees: Methe, Methe (GER)

21 January; 18:00	Austria	37–37	Iceland	Attendance: 6,000; Referees: Dinu, Din (ROU)
21 January; 18:00	Szilágyi 10	(17–20)	Atlason 8	Attendance: 6,000; Referees: Dinu, Din (ROU)
21 January; 18:00	3× (yellow card) 4× (suspension)	Report	3× (yellow card) 2× (suspension)	Attendance: 6,000; Referees: Dinu, Din (ROU)

21 January; 20:15	Serbia	23–28	Denmark	Attendance: 6,000; Referees: Horacek, Novotny (CZE)
21 January; 20:15	Ilić, Stanković, Šešum 4	(9–15)	Eggert 10	Attendance: 6,000; Referees: Horacek, Novotny (CZE)
21 January; 20:15	3× (yellow card) 6× (suspension)	Report	3× (yellow card) 3× (suspension)	Attendance: 6,000; Referees: Horacek, Novotny (CZE)

23 January; 18:00	Austria	37–31	Serbia	Attendance: 6,000; Referees: Muro, Rodriguez (ESP)
23 January; 18:00	Szilágyi 9	(15–18)	Šešum 8	Attendance: 6,000; Referees: Muro, Rodriguez (ESP)
23 January; 18:00	4× (yellow card) 6× (suspension) 1× (red card)	Report	3× (yellow card) 6× (suspension)	Attendance: 6,000; Referees: Muro, Rodriguez (ESP)

23 January; 20:15	Denmark	22–27	Iceland	Attendance: 5,500; Referees: Canbro, Claesson (SWE)
23 January; 20:15	Christiansen 5	(13–15)	Sigurðsson 6	Attendance: 5,500; Referees: Canbro, Claesson (SWE)
23 January; 20:15	4× (yellow card) 5× (suspension)	Report	3× (yellow card) 5× (suspension)	Attendance: 5,500; Referees: Canbro, Claesson (SWE)

=== Group C ===
Venue: Olympiaworld, Innsbruck

Team	Pld	W	D	L	GF	GA	GD	Pts
Poland	3	2	1	0	84	79	+5	5
Slovenia	3	1	2	0	91	89	+2	4
Germany	3	1	1	1	89	90	−1	3
Sweden	3	0	0	3	78	84	−6	0

All times are Central European Time (UTC+1)

19 January; 18:30	Germany	25−27	Poland	Attendance: 6,800; Referees: Olesen, Pedersen (DEN)
19 January; 18:30	Kaufmann 7	(8−12)	Bielecki 6	Attendance: 6,800; Referees: Olesen, Pedersen (DEN)
19 January; 18:30	2× (yellow card) 4× (suspension)	Report	3× (yellow card) 4× (suspension)	Attendance: 6,800; Referees: Olesen, Pedersen (DEN)

19 January; 20:30	Sweden	25−27	Slovenia	Attendance: 4,800; Referees: Reisinger, Kaschütz (AUT)
19 January; 20:30	Källman, Karlsson, Ekberg, Doder 5	(13−7)	Žvižej 8	Attendance: 4,800; Referees: Reisinger, Kaschütz (AUT)
19 January; 20:30	2× (yellow card) 6× (suspension)	Report	3× (yellow card) 6× (suspension)	Attendance: 4,800; Referees: Reisinger, Kaschütz (AUT)

20 January; 18:30	Slovenia	34−34	Germany	Attendance: 7,200; Referees: Gousko, Repkin (BLR)
20 January; 18:30	Kavtičnik, Špiler 7	(16−11)	Theuerkauf 7	Attendance: 7,200; Referees: Gousko, Repkin (BLR)
20 January; 18:30	3× (yellow card) 5× (suspension)	Report	3× (yellow card) 2× (suspension)	Attendance: 7,200; Referees: Gousko, Repkin (BLR)

20 January; 20:30	Poland	27−24	Sweden	Attendance: 7,500; Referees: Nikolic, Stojkovic (SRB)
20 January; 20:30	Jurecki, Rosiński 6	(15−14)	Andersson 4	Attendance: 7,500; Referees: Nikolic, Stojkovic (SRB)
20 January; 20:30	2× (yellow card) 3× (suspension)	Report	3× (yellow card) 8× (suspension)	Attendance: 7,500; Referees: Nikolic, Stojkovic (SRB)

22 January; 18:15	Germany	30−29	Sweden	Attendance: 8,200; Referees: Nikolic, Stojkovic (SRB)
22 January; 18:15	Glandorf 8	(21−18)	Andersson 7	Attendance: 8,200; Referees: Nikolic, Stojkovic (SRB)
22 January; 18:15	3× (yellow card) 4× (suspension) 1× (red card)	Report	2× (yellow card) 2× (suspension)	Attendance: 8,200; Referees: Nikolic, Stojkovic (SRB)

22 January; 20:15	Poland	30−30	Slovenia	Attendance: 7,500; Referees: Abrahamsen, Kristiansen (NOR)
22 January; 20:15	Lijewski 6	(12−13)	Žvižej 9	Attendance: 7,500; Referees: Abrahamsen, Kristiansen (NOR)
22 January; 20:15	4× (yellow card) 7× (suspension)	Report	3× (yellow card) 7× (suspension)	Attendance: 7,500; Referees: Abrahamsen, Kristiansen (NOR)

=== Group D ===
Venue: Arena Nova, Wiener Neustadt

Team	Pld	W	D	L	GF	GA	GD	Pts
Spain	3	2	1	0	95	74	+21	5
France	3	1	2	0	74	73	+1	4
Czech Republic	3	1	0	2	78	84	−6	2
Hungary	3	0	1	2	80	96	−16	1

All times are Central European Time (UTC+1)

19 January; 18:15	Spain	37–25	Czech Republic	Attendance: 2,800; Referees: Din, Dinu (ROU)
19 January; 18:15	Romero 14	(17–10)	Jicha 8	Attendance: 2,800; Referees: Din, Dinu (ROU)
19 January; 18:15	2× (yellow card) 6× (suspension)	Report	3× (yellow card) 6× (suspension)	Attendance: 2,800; Referees: Din, Dinu (ROU)

19 January; 20:15	France	29–29	Hungary	Attendance: 3,500; Referees: Nikolic, Stojkovic (SRB)
19 January; 20:15	Karabatić 7	(16–16)	Ilyés 7	Attendance: 3,500; Referees: Nikolic, Stojkovic (SRB)
19 January; 20:15	3× (yellow card) 3× (suspension)	Report	3× (yellow card) 8× (suspension) 1× (red card)	Attendance: 3,500; Referees: Nikolic, Stojkovic (SRB)

20 January; 18:15	Czech Republic	20–21	France	Attendance: 3,800; Referees: Abrahamsen, Kristiansen (NOR)
20 January; 18:15	Jicha 6	(10–16)	Abalo, Narcisse 4	Attendance: 3,800; Referees: Abrahamsen, Kristiansen (NOR)
20 January; 18:15	3× (yellow card) 3× (suspension)	Report	3× (yellow card) 1× (suspension)	Attendance: 3,800; Referees: Abrahamsen, Kristiansen (NOR)

20 January; 20:15	Hungary	25–34	Spain	Attendance: 3,800; Referees: Reisinger, Kaschütz (AUT)
20 January; 20:15	Gulyás, Krivokapic 5	(9–17)	Alberto Entrerríos, González 7	Attendance: 3,800; Referees: Reisinger, Kaschütz (AUT)
20 January; 20:15	2× (yellow card) 6× (suspension)	Report	4× (yellow card) 3× (suspension)	Attendance: 3,800; Referees: Reisinger, Kaschütz (AUT)

22 January; 18:15	France	24−24	Spain	Attendance: 3,800; Referees: Gousko, Repkin (BLR)
22 January; 18:15	Karabatić 5	(10–10)	Aguinagalde, Garcia 6	Attendance: 3,800; Referees: Gousko, Repkin (BLR)
22 January; 18:15	4× (yellow card) 4× (suspension)	Report	3× (yellow card) 3× (suspension)	Attendance: 3,800; Referees: Gousko, Repkin (BLR)

22 January; 20:15	Hungary	26−33	Czech Republic	Attendance: 4,000; Referees: Olesen, Pedersen (DEN)
22 January; 20:15	Császár 6	(13–14)	Jicha 14	Attendance: 4,000; Referees: Olesen, Pedersen (DEN)
22 January; 20:15	3× (yellow card) 6× (suspension)	Report	3× (yellow card) 4× (suspension)	Attendance: 4,000; Referees: Olesen, Pedersen (DEN)

== Main round ==
Team advanced to the Semifinals
Team will compete for the 5th/6th place

=== Group I ===
Venue: Stadthalle, Vienna

Team	Pld	W	D	L	GF	GA	GD	Pts
Croatia	5	4	1	0	134	123	+11	9
Iceland	5	3	2	0	163	149	+14	8
Denmark	5	3	0	2	136	134	+2	6
Norway	5	2	0	3	138	135	+3	4
Austria	5	1	1	3	147	156	−9	3
Russia	5	0	0	5	140	161	−21	0

25 January; 16:00	Croatia	26–26	Iceland	Attendance: 6,800; Referees: Horacek, Novotny (CZE)
25 January; 16:00	Čupić 5	(12–15)	Stefánsson 7	Attendance: 6,800; Referees: Horacek, Novotny (CZE)
25 January; 16:00	3× (yellow card) 5× (suspension) 1× (red card)	Report	3× (yellow card) 9× (suspension) 1× (red card)	Attendance: 6,800; Referees: Horacek, Novotny (CZE)

25 January; 18:00	Norway	30–27	Austria	Attendance: 6,800; Referees: Lazaar, Reveret (FRA)
25 January; 18:00	Myrhol, Tvedten 6	(12–11)	Schlinger 6	Attendance: 6,800; Referees: Lazaar, Reveret (FRA)
25 January; 18:00	3× (yellow card) 2× (suspension)	Report	3× (yellow card) 7× (suspension) 1× (red card)	Attendance: 6,800; Referees: Lazaar, Reveret (FRA)

25 January; 20:15	Russia	28–34	Denmark	Attendance: 6,800; Referees: Muro, Rodriguez (ESP)
25 January; 20:15	Igropulo 6	(13–18)	Christiansen, Knudsen 6	Attendance: 6,800; Referees: Muro, Rodriguez (ESP)
25 January; 20:15	3× (yellow card) 3× (suspension) 1× (red card)	Report	4× (yellow card) 4× (suspension)	Attendance: 6,800; Referees: Muro, Rodriguez (ESP)

26 January; 16:00	Russia	30–38	Iceland	Attendance: 4,000; Referees: Lazaar, Reveret (FRA)
26 January; 16:00	Chipurin 7	(10–19)	Guðjónsson, Petersson 7	Attendance: 4,000; Referees: Lazaar, Reveret (FRA)
26 January; 16:00	3× (yellow card) 6× (suspension)	Report	3× (yellow card) 6× (suspension)	Attendance: 4,000; Referees: Lazaar, Reveret (FRA)

26 January; 18:00	Croatia	26–23	Austria	Attendance: 8,000; Referees: Canbro, Claesson (SWE)
26 January; 18:00	Čupić 6	(11–10)	Schlinger, Szilágy 5	Attendance: 8,000; Referees: Canbro, Claesson (SWE)
26 January; 18:00	2× (yellow card) 3× (suspension)	Report	4× (yellow card) 4× (suspension) 1× (red card)	Attendance: 8,000; Referees: Canbro, Claesson (SWE)

26 January; 20:15	Norway	23–24	Denmark	Attendance: 7,000; Referees: Methe, Methe (GER)
26 January; 20:15	Kjelling 7	(15–11)	Eggert Jensen, Hansen, Lindberg 5	Attendance: 7,000; Referees: Methe, Methe (GER)
26 January; 20:15	3× (yellow card) 4× (suspension)	Report	3× (yellow card) 6× (suspension)	Attendance: 7,000; Referees: Methe, Methe (GER)

28 January; 16:00	Norway	34–35	Iceland	Attendance: 7,000; Referees: Muro, Rodriguez (ESP)
28 January; 16:00	Tvedten 7	(16–18)	Atlason 10	Attendance: 7,000; Referees: Muro, Rodriguez (ESP)
28 January; 16:00	3× (yellow card) 5× (suspension)	Report	3× (yellow card) 5× (suspension)	Attendance: 7,000; Referees: Muro, Rodriguez (ESP)

28 January; 18:00	Russia	30–31	Austria	Attendance: 8,200; Referees: Methe, Methe (GER)
28 January; 18:00	Chipurin 7	(15–17)	Weber, Wilczynski, Schlinger 6	Attendance: 8,200; Referees: Methe, Methe (GER)
28 January; 18:00	3× (yellow card) 11× (suspension)	Report	3× (yellow card) 9× (suspension)	Attendance: 8,200; Referees: Methe, Methe (GER)

28 January; 20:15	Croatia	27–23	Denmark	Attendance: 9,000; Referees: Horacek, Novotny (CZE)
28 January; 20:15	Buntić 8	(14–11)	Hansen, Knudsen 5	Attendance: 9,000; Referees: Horacek, Novotny (CZE)
28 January; 20:15	4× (yellow card) 6× (suspension)	Report	3× (yellow card) 6× (suspension)	Attendance: 9,000; Referees: Horacek, Novotny (CZE)

=== Group II ===
Venue: Olympiaworld, Innsbruck

Team	Pld	W	D	L	GF	GA	GD	Pts
France	5	4	1	0	135	118	+17	9
Poland	5	3	1	1	148	144	+4	7
Spain	5	3	1	1	152	133	+19	7
Czech Republic	5	1	1	3	142	154	−12	3
Germany	5	0	2	3	127	136	−9	2
Slovenia	5	0	2	3	159	178	−19	2

24 January; 16:30	Germany	22–24	France	Attendance: 8,200; Referees: Din, Dinu (ROU)
24 January; 16:30	Jansen 5	(10–12)	Joli 7	Attendance: 8,200; Referees: Din, Dinu (ROU)
24 January; 16:30	3× (yellow card) 4× (suspension)	Report	4× (yellow card) 1× (suspension)	Attendance: 8,200; Referees: Din, Dinu (ROU)

24 January; 18:30	Poland	32–26	Spain	Attendance: 7,700; Referees: Olesen, Pedersen (DEN)
24 January; 18:30	Jurecki 6	(13–9)	Romero 8	Attendance: 7,700; Referees: Olesen, Pedersen (DEN)
24 January; 18:30	3× (yellow card) 5× (suspension)	Report	2× (yellow card) 2× (suspension)	Attendance: 7,700; Referees: Olesen, Pedersen (DEN)

24 January; 20:30	Slovenia	35–37	Czech Republic	Attendance: 5,600; Referees: Kaschütz, Reisinger (AUT)
24 January; 20:30	Kavtičnik 8	(12–21)	Jicha 12	Attendance: 5,600; Referees: Kaschütz, Reisinger (AUT)
24 January; 20:30	3× (yellow card) 3× (suspension)	Report	3× (yellow card) 6× (suspension)	Attendance: 5,600; Referees: Kaschütz, Reisinger (AUT)

26 January; 16:15	Slovenia	28–37	France	Attendance: 4,500; Referees: Olesen, Pedersen (DEN)
26 January; 16:15	Kavtičnik, Žvižej 6	(18–17)	Guigou 10	Attendance: 4,500; Referees: Olesen, Pedersen (DEN)
26 January; 16:15	3× (yellow card) 4× (suspension)	Report	3× (yellow card)	Attendance: 4,500; Referees: Olesen, Pedersen (DEN)

26 January; 18:15	Germany	20–25	Spain	Attendance: 7,000; Referees: Nikolic, Stojkovic (SRB)
26 January; 18:15	Gensheimer 5	(9–14)	Tomás 6	Attendance: 7,000; Referees: Nikolic, Stojkovic (SRB)
26 January; 18:15	3× (yellow card) 4× (suspension)	Report	3× (yellow card) 6× (suspension)	Attendance: 7,000; Referees: Nikolic, Stojkovic (SRB)

26 January; 20:15	Poland	35–34	Czech Republic	Attendance: 5,100; Referees: Abrahamsen, Kristiansen (NOR)
26 January; 20:15	Bielecki 7	(18–19)	Jicha 7	Attendance: 5,100; Referees: Abrahamsen, Kristiansen (NOR)
26 January; 20:15	3× (yellow card) 1× (suspension)	Report	3× (yellow card) 3× (suspension)	Attendance: 5,100; Referees: Abrahamsen, Kristiansen (NOR)

28 January; 16:30	Germany	26–26	Czech Republic	Attendance: 5,200; Referees: Abrahamsen, Kristiansen (NOR)
28 January; 16:30	Kaufmann 7	(16–14)	Jicha 6	Attendance: 5,200; Referees: Abrahamsen, Kristiansen (NOR)
28 January; 16:30	2× (yellow card) 2× (suspension)	Report	3× (yellow card) 4× (suspension)	Attendance: 5,200; Referees: Abrahamsen, Kristiansen (NOR)

28 January; 18:30	Slovenia	32–40	Spain	Attendance: 6,400; Referees: Din, Dinu (ROU)
28 January; 18:30	Žvižej 9	(14–20)	Entrerrios 11	Attendance: 6,400; Referees: Din, Dinu (ROU)
28 January; 18:30	3× (yellow card) 2× (suspension)	Report	3× (yellow card) 4× (suspension)	Attendance: 6,400; Referees: Din, Dinu (ROU)

28 January; 20:30	Poland	24–29	France	Attendance: 7,000; Referees: Nikolic, Stojkovic (SRB)
28 January; 20:30	Bielecki 5	(10–15)	Narcisse, Sorhaindo 6	Attendance: 7,000; Referees: Nikolic, Stojkovic (SRB)
28 January; 20:30	4× (yellow card) 4× (suspension)	Report	3× (yellow card) 1× (suspension)	Attendance: 7,000; Referees: Nikolic, Stojkovic (SRB)

== Final round ==
Venue: Stadthalle, Vienna

Semifinal
30 January – 14:00 (Vienna)
Iceland	28
France	36
30 January – 16:30 (Vienna)
Croatia	24
Poland	21

Final
31 January – 17:30 (Vienna)
France	25
Croatia	21
Bronze Match
31 January – 15:00 (Vienna)
Iceland	29
Poland	26

=== 5th/6th place ===
30 January; 11:30	Denmark	34–27	Spain	Attendance: 4,000; Referees: Reisinger, Kaschütz (AUT)
30 January; 11:30	Laen 8	(18–13)	Malmagro 7	Attendance: 4,000; Referees: Reisinger, Kaschütz (AUT)
30 January; 11:30	2× (yellow card) 6× (suspension)	Report	2× (yellow card) 4× (suspension)	Attendance: 4,000; Referees: Reisinger, Kaschütz (AUT)

=== Semifinals ===
30 January; 14:00	Iceland	28–36	France	Attendance: 9,000; Referees: Olesen, Pedersen (DEN)
30 January; 14:00	Pálmarsson 6	(14–16)	Karabatić 9	Attendance: 9,000; Referees: Olesen, Pedersen (DEN)
30 January; 14:00	3× (yellow card) 4× (suspension)	Report	3× (yellow card) 4× (suspension)	Attendance: 9,000; Referees: Olesen, Pedersen (DEN)

30 January; 16:30	Croatia	24–21	Poland	Attendance: 11,000; Referees: Abrahamsen, Kristiansen (NOR)
30 January; 16:30	Čupić 6	(9–10)	Jurecki 7	Attendance: 11,000; Referees: Abrahamsen, Kristiansen (NOR)
30 January; 16:30	3× (yellow card) 4× (suspension)	Report	3× (yellow card) 3× (suspension)	Attendance: 11,000; Referees: Abrahamsen, Kristiansen (NOR)

=== Bronze-medal game ===
31 January; 15:00	Poland	26–29	Iceland	Attendance: 9,000; Referees: Lazaar, Reveret (FRA)
31 January; 15:00	B. Jurecki, M. Jurecki, Tłuczyński 4	(10–18)	Sigurðsson 8	Attendance: 9,000; Referees: Lazaar, Reveret (FRA)
31 January; 15:00	3× (yellow card) 8× (suspension)	Report	3× (yellow card) 4× (suspension)	Attendance: 9,000; Referees: Lazaar, Reveret (FRA)

=== Final ===
31 January; 17:30	Croatia	21–25	France	Attendance: 11,000; Referees: Methe, Methe (GER)
31 January; 17:30	Zrnić 7	(12–12)	Karabatić 6	Attendance: 11,000; Referees: Methe, Methe (GER)
31 January; 17:30	4× (yellow card) 3× (suspension) 1× (red card)	Report	4× (yellow card) 3× (suspension)	Attendance: 11,000; Referees: Methe, Methe (GER)

== Ranking and statistics ==
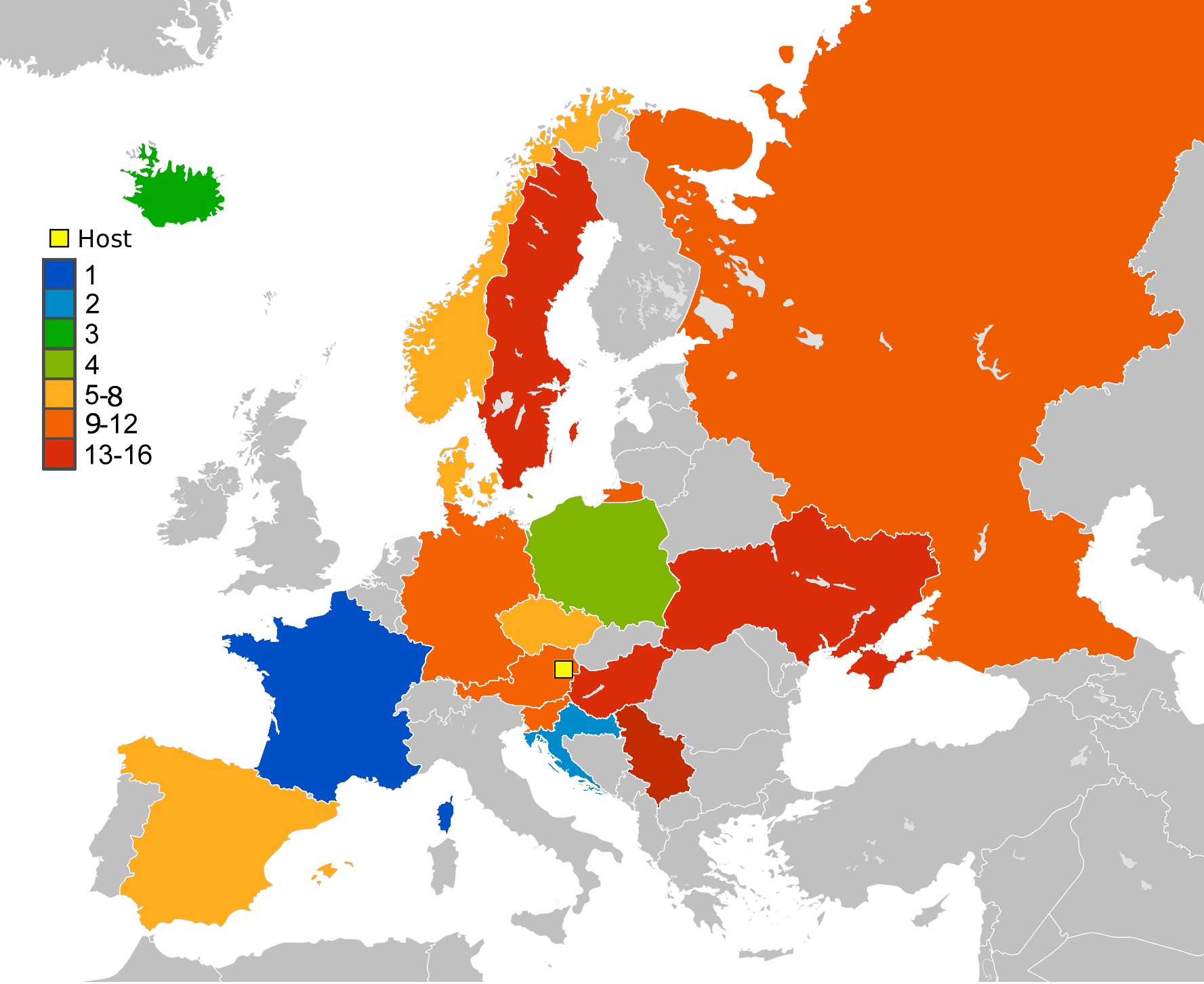
Results

=== Final ranking ===
Gold medal	France
Silver medal	Croatia
Bronze medal	Iceland
4	Poland
5	Denmark
6	Spain
7	Norway
8	Czech Republic
9	Austria
10	Germany
11	Slovenia
12	Russia
13	Serbia
14	Hungary
15	Sweden
16	Ukraine

Team advanced to the 2011 World Men's Handball Championship
Sweden and France are already qualified as hosts and reigning champions respectively.

2010 Men's Handball European Champions

France
Second Title

=== All Star Team ===
- Goalkeeper: Sławomir Szmal (POL)
- Left Wing: Manuel Štrlek (CRO)
- Left Back: Filip Jicha (CZE)
- Playmaker: Nikola Karabatic (FRA)
- Pivot: Igor Vori (CRO)
- Right Back: Ólafur Stefánsson (ISL)
- Right Wing: Luc Abalo (FRA)

=== Other awards ===
- Best Defence Player : Jakov Gojun (CRO)
- Most Valuable Player: Filip Jícha (CZE)

Source: ehf-euro.com

=== Top goalkeepers ===
Total Shots (Top 10)
Rank	Name	Team	Shots	Saves	%	MP
1	Sławomir Szmal	Poland	316	123	39	8
2	Thierry Omeyer	France	301	113	38	8
3	Mirko Alilović	Croatia	271	98	36	8
3	Mattias Andersson	Sweden	64	23	36	3
5	Thomas Bauer	Austria	58	20	34	6
5	Johannes Bitter	Germany	195	67	34	6
5	Martin Galia	Czech Republic	174	59	34	6
5	Silvio Heinevetter	Germany	56	19	34	6
5	Kasper Hvidt	Denmark	176	59	34	7
5	Gennadiy Komok	Ukraine	83	28	34	3

Source: EHF

=== Top goalscorers ===
Total Goals (Top 10)
Rank	Name	Team	Shots	Goals	%	MP
1	Filip Jícha	Czech Republic	88	53	60	6
2	Luka Žvižej	Slovenia	64	41	64	6
3	Nikola Karabatic	France	73	40	55	8
4	Arnór Atlason	Iceland	66	39	59	8
4	Guðjón Valur Sigurðsson	Iceland	62	39	63	8
4	Håvard Tvedten	Norway	58	39	67	6
7	Ivan Čupić	Croatia	53	36	68	8
7	Snorri Steinn Guðjónsson	Iceland	56	36	64	8
9	Konstantin Igropulo	Russia	60	35	58	6
10	Róbert Gunnarsson	Iceland	44	34	77	8

Source: EHF

== EHF Broadcasting rights ==
EHF Broadcasting rights
Standard Definition (SDTV)
Austria	ORF1 • ORF Sport Plus
Croatia	HRT2
Czech Republic	ČT4
Denmark	TV 2 • TV 2 Sport
France	Canal+ Sport • Sport+
Germany	ARD • ZDF • DSF
Hungary	Sport TV
Iceland	RÚV
Italy	Sportitalia
Lithuania	Sport1
Norway	TV 2 • TV 2 Zebra • TV 2 Sport
Poland	Polsat • Polsat Sport • Polsat Sport Extra
Serbia	RTS 1 • RTS 2
Slovenia	TVS 2
Spain	Teledeporte TVE • Canal+
Sweden	TV4 • TV4 Sport
High Definition (HDTV)
Austria	ORF1 HB HD
Poland	Polsat Sport HD
Sweden	TV4 HD

== See also ==
- 2010 European Women's Handball Championship
