= 2010 European Men's Handball Championship qualification – Group 3 =

Men's Handball Tournament

The qualification group 3 for the 2010 European Men's Handball Championship includes the national teams of Belgium, Estonia, Iceland, Macedonia and Norway.

== Standings ==
Pos	Team	Pld	W	D	L	GF	GA	GD	Pts	Qualification	ISL	NOR	MKD	EST	BEL
1	Iceland	8	5	3	0	264	212	+52	13	Final tournament	—	34–34	34–26	38–24	40–21
2	Norway	8	5	2	1	266	226	+40	12	Final tournament	31–31	—	36–30	31–23	35–24
3	Macedonia	8	4	1	3	231	223	+8	9		26–29	30–29	—	31–22	33–26
4	Estonia	8	2	2	4	213	238	−25	6		25–25	25–33	28–28	—	37–28
5	Belgium	8	0	0	8	196	271	−75	0		25–33	29–37	19–27	25–29	—

== Fixtures and results ==
October 29, 2008; 19:10 CET	Estonia	25 : 33	Norway	Mesikäpa Hall, Põlva; Attendance: 900; Referees: Solodko, Solodko (POL)
October 29, 2008; 19:10 CET	Patrail 8	(8:20)	Myrhol 6	Mesikäpa Hall, Põlva; Attendance: 900; Referees: Solodko, Solodko (POL)
October 29, 2008; 19:10 CET	3× (yellow card) 3× (suspension)	Report	3× (yellow card) 4× (suspension)	Mesikäpa Hall, Põlva; Attendance: 900; Referees: Solodko, Solodko (POL)

October 29, 2008; 20:15 CET	Iceland	40 : 21	Belgium	Laugardalshöll, Reykjavík; Attendance: 2,700; Referees: Nielsen, Lorentzen (DEN)
October 29, 2008; 20:15 CET	Sigurdson 12	(19:9)	Havenith 5	Laugardalshöll, Reykjavík; Attendance: 2,700; Referees: Nielsen, Lorentzen (DEN)
October 29, 2008; 20:15 CET	3× (yellow card) 3× (suspension)	Report	3× (yellow card) 4× (suspension)	Laugardalshöll, Reykjavík; Attendance: 2,700; Referees: Nielsen, Lorentzen (DEN)

November 1, 2008; 16:15 CET	Norway	31 : 31	Iceland	Drammenshallen, Drammen; Attendance: 2,700; Referees: Krstić, Ljubič (SLO)
November 1, 2008; 16:15 CET	Myrhol 6	(16:13)	Geirsson 13	Drammenshallen, Drammen; Attendance: 2,700; Referees: Krstić, Ljubič (SLO)
November 1, 2008; 16:15 CET	3× (yellow card) 5× (suspension) 1× (red card)	Report	3× (yellow card) 7× (suspension) 1× (red card)	Drammenshallen, Drammen; Attendance: 2,700; Referees: Krstić, Ljubič (SLO)

November 2, 2008; 14:15 CET	Belgium	25 : 29	Estonia	Sporthal Lakerveld, Houthalen-Helchteren; Attendance: 1,200; Referees: Gubica, Milošević (CRO)
November 2, 2008; 14:15 CET	Kopljar 5	(11:12)	Patrail 7	Sporthal Lakerveld, Houthalen-Helchteren; Attendance: 1,200; Referees: Gubica, Milošević (CRO)
November 2, 2008; 14:15 CET	3× (yellow card) 3× (suspension)	Report	3× (yellow card) 4× (suspension)	Sporthal Lakerveld, Houthalen-Helchteren; Attendance: 1,200; Referees: Gubica, Milošević (CRO)

November 26, 2008; 20:30 CET	Belgium	29 : 37	Norway	Sporthal Hekers, Ghent; Attendance: 1,000; Referees: Kavulic, Skruzny
November 26, 2008; 20:30 CET	Dewit 6	(13:19)	Myrhol 9	Sporthal Hekers, Ghent; Attendance: 1,000; Referees: Kavulic, Skruzny
November 26, 2008; 20:30 CET	3× (yellow card) 3× (suspension)	Report	3× (yellow card) 2× (suspension)	Sporthal Hekers, Ghent; Attendance: 1,000; Referees: Kavulic, Skruzny

November 27, 2008; 17:30 CET	Macedonia	31 : 22	Estonia	Boris Trajkovski Sports Center, Skopje; Attendance: 4,000; Referees: Harabagiu, Stanescu (ROU)
November 27, 2008; 17:30 CET	K. Lazarov 6	(13:8)	Patrail 8	Boris Trajkovski Sports Center, Skopje; Attendance: 4,000; Referees: Harabagiu, Stanescu (ROU)
November 27, 2008; 17:30 CET	1× (yellow card)	Report	3× (yellow card) 1× (suspension)	Boris Trajkovski Sports Center, Skopje; Attendance: 4,000; Referees: Harabagiu, Stanescu (ROU)

November 29, 2008; 16:10 CET	Norway	35 : 24	Belgium	Bodø Spektrum, Bodø; Attendance: 2,800; Referees: Andorka, Hucker (HUN)
November 29, 2008; 16:10 CET	Myrhol 11	(18:15)	Havenith 7	Bodø Spektrum, Bodø; Attendance: 2,800; Referees: Andorka, Hucker (HUN)
November 29, 2008; 16:10 CET	3× (yellow card) 2× (suspension)	Report	3× (yellow card) 4× (suspension)	Bodø Spektrum, Bodø; Attendance: 2,800; Referees: Andorka, Hucker (HUN)

November 29, 2008; 19:10 CET	Estonia	28 : 28	Macedonia	Mesikäpa Hall, Põlva; Attendance: 800; Referees: Kohout, Novak (CZE)
November 29, 2008; 19:10 CET	Patrail 8	(15:15)	K. Lazarov 12	Mesikäpa Hall, Põlva; Attendance: 800; Referees: Kohout, Novak (CZE)
November 29, 2008; 19:10 CET	3× (yellow card) 5× (suspension)	Report	2× (yellow card) 9× (suspension) 1× (red card)	Mesikäpa Hall, Põlva; Attendance: 800; Referees: Kohout, Novak (CZE)

March 18, 2009; 19:00 CET	Estonia	37 : 28	Belgium	Mesikäpa Hall, Põlva; Attendance: 1,000; Referees: Zotin, Volodkov (RUS)
March 18, 2009; 19:00 CET	Patrail 8	(17:12)	Cauwenberghs 7	Mesikäpa Hall, Põlva; Attendance: 1,000; Referees: Zotin, Volodkov (RUS)
March 18, 2009; 19:00 CET	2× (yellow card) 2× (suspension)	Report	3× (yellow card) 7× (suspension)	Mesikäpa Hall, Põlva; Attendance: 1,000; Referees: Zotin, Volodkov (RUS)

March 18, 2009; 20:15 CET	Macedonia	26 : 29	Iceland	Boris Trajkovski Sports Center, Skopje; Attendance: 6,000; Referees: Methe, Methe (GER)
March 18, 2009; 20:15 CET	Lazarov 10	(10:13)	Sigurðsson 9	Boris Trajkovski Sports Center, Skopje; Attendance: 6,000; Referees: Methe, Methe (GER)
March 18, 2009; 20:15 CET	3× (yellow card) 7× (suspension) 1× (red card)	Report	3× (yellow card) 7× (suspension)	Boris Trajkovski Sports Center, Skopje; Attendance: 6,000; Referees: Methe, Methe (GER)

March 21, 2009; 23:00 CET	Iceland	38 : 24	Estonia	Íthrottahúsid Ásvöllum, Hafnarfjörður; Attendance: 2,200; Referees: Hansen, Samuelsen (FRO)
March 21, 2009; 23:00 CET	Hallgrimsson 7	(20:8)	Patrail 8	Íthrottahúsid Ásvöllum, Hafnarfjörður; Attendance: 2,200; Referees: Hansen, Samuelsen (FRO)
March 21, 2009; 23:00 CET	3× (yellow card)	Report	2× (yellow card) 4× (suspension)	Íthrottahúsid Ásvöllum, Hafnarfjörður; Attendance: 2,200; Referees: Hansen, Samuelsen (FRO)

March 22, 2009; 14:10 CET	Belgium	19 : 27	Macedonia	Hall omnisport La Preale, Herstal; Attendance: 800; Referees: Lorente, Serradilla (ESP)
March 22, 2009; 14:10 CET	Houbrechts 7	(8:12)	F. Lazarov, K. Lazarov 6	Hall omnisport La Preale, Herstal; Attendance: 800; Referees: Lorente, Serradilla (ESP)
March 22, 2009; 14:10 CET	3× (yellow card) 2× (suspension)	Report	2× (yellow card) 3× (suspension)	Hall omnisport La Preale, Herstal; Attendance: 800; Referees: Lorente, Serradilla (ESP)

June 10, 2009; 13:00 CET	Norway	36 : 30	Macedonia	Stavanger, Norway; Attendance: 5,200; Referees: Herczeg, Südi (HUN)
June 10, 2009; 13:00 CET	Tvedten 12	(17:13)	K. Lazarov 9	Stavanger, Norway; Attendance: 5,200; Referees: Herczeg, Südi (HUN)
June 10, 2009; 13:00 CET	3× (yellow card) 2× (suspension)	Report	3× (yellow card) 2× (suspension)	Stavanger, Norway; Attendance: 5,200; Referees: Herczeg, Südi (HUN)

June 10, 2009; 13:00 CET	Belgium	25 : 33	Iceland	Lange Munte, Kortrijk; Attendance: 1,500; Referees: Akman, Ersan (TUR)
June 10, 2009; 13:00 CET	Langer 5	(14:15)	Petersson, Sigurðsson 9	Lange Munte, Kortrijk; Attendance: 1,500; Referees: Akman, Ersan (TUR)
June 10, 2009; 13:00 CET	3× (yellow card) 4× (suspension) 1× (red card)	Report	3× (yellow card) 4× (suspension)	Lange Munte, Kortrijk; Attendance: 1,500; Referees: Akman, Ersan (TUR)

June 14, 2009; 16:00 CET	Iceland	34 : 34	Norway	Laugardalshöll, Reykjavík; Attendance: 2,400; Referees: Olesen, Pedersen (DEN)
June 14, 2009; 16:00 CET	Petersson 10	(17:13)	Mamelund 13	Laugardalshöll, Reykjavík; Attendance: 2,400; Referees: Olesen, Pedersen (DEN)
June 14, 2009; 16:00 CET	3× (yellow card) 6× (suspension) 1× (red card)	Report	3× (yellow card) 6× (suspension) 1× (red card)	Laugardalshöll, Reykjavík; Attendance: 2,400; Referees: Olesen, Pedersen (DEN)

June 13, 2009; 16:00 CET	Macedonia	33 : 26	Belgium	Boris Trajkovski Sports Center, Skopje; Attendance: 1,000; Referees: Aghakishiyev, Aliyev (AZE)
June 13, 2009; 16:00 CET	Pavlovski 9	(19:9)	Mathijs 7	Boris Trajkovski Sports Center, Skopje; Attendance: 1,000; Referees: Aghakishiyev, Aliyev (AZE)
June 13, 2009; 16:00 CET	2× (yellow card) 4× (suspension) 1× (red card)	Report	3× (yellow card) 6× (suspension)	Boris Trajkovski Sports Center, Skopje; Attendance: 1,000; Referees: Aghakishiyev, Aliyev (AZE)

June 17, 2009; 20:00 CET	Iceland	34 : 26	Macedonia	Laugardalshöll, Reykjavík; Attendance: 2,700; Referees: Licis, Stolarovs (LAT)
June 17, 2009; 20:00 CET	Petersson 10	(17:13)	Jonovski 7	Laugardalshöll, Reykjavík; Attendance: 2,700; Referees: Licis, Stolarovs (LAT)
June 17, 2009; 20:00 CET	3× (yellow card) 6× (suspension)	Report	3× (yellow card) 4× (suspension)	Laugardalshöll, Reykjavík; Attendance: 2,700; Referees: Licis, Stolarovs (LAT)

June 17, 2009; 20:00 CET	Norway	31 : 23	Estonia	Nye Nidarøhallen, Trondheim; Attendance: 4,800; Referees: Egberts, Van de Beek (NED)
June 17, 2009; 20:00 CET	Klev 8	(15:13)	Jaanimaa, Johannson 5	Nye Nidarøhallen, Trondheim; Attendance: 4,800; Referees: Egberts, Van de Beek (NED)
June 17, 2009; 20:00 CET	3× (yellow card) 3× (suspension)	Report	2× (yellow card) 2× (suspension)	Nye Nidarøhallen, Trondheim; Attendance: 4,800; Referees: Egberts, Van de Beek (NED)

June 20, 2009; 20:00 CET	Macedonia	30 : 29	Norway	Boris Trajkovski Sports Center, Skopje; Attendance: 2,000; Referees: Din, Dinu (ROU)
June 20, 2009; 20:00 CET	K. Lazarov 9	(10:15)	Klev 6	Boris Trajkovski Sports Center, Skopje; Attendance: 2,000; Referees: Din, Dinu (ROU)
June 20, 2009; 20:00 CET	3× (yellow card) 1× (suspension)	Report	3× (yellow card) 4× (suspension)	Boris Trajkovski Sports Center, Skopje; Attendance: 2,000; Referees: Din, Dinu (ROU)

June 20, 2009; 23:00 CET	Estonia	25 : 25	Iceland	Mesikäpa Hall, Põlva; Attendance: 800; Referees: Hajek, Macho (CZE)
June 20, 2009; 23:00 CET	Patrail 9	(15:13)	Óskarsson 7	Mesikäpa Hall, Põlva; Attendance: 800; Referees: Hajek, Macho (CZE)
June 20, 2009; 23:00 CET	3× (yellow card) 3× (suspension)	Report	3× (yellow card) 5× (suspension)	Mesikäpa Hall, Põlva; Attendance: 800; Referees: Hajek, Macho (CZE)
