= Vitaliy Nat =

Ukrainian handball player

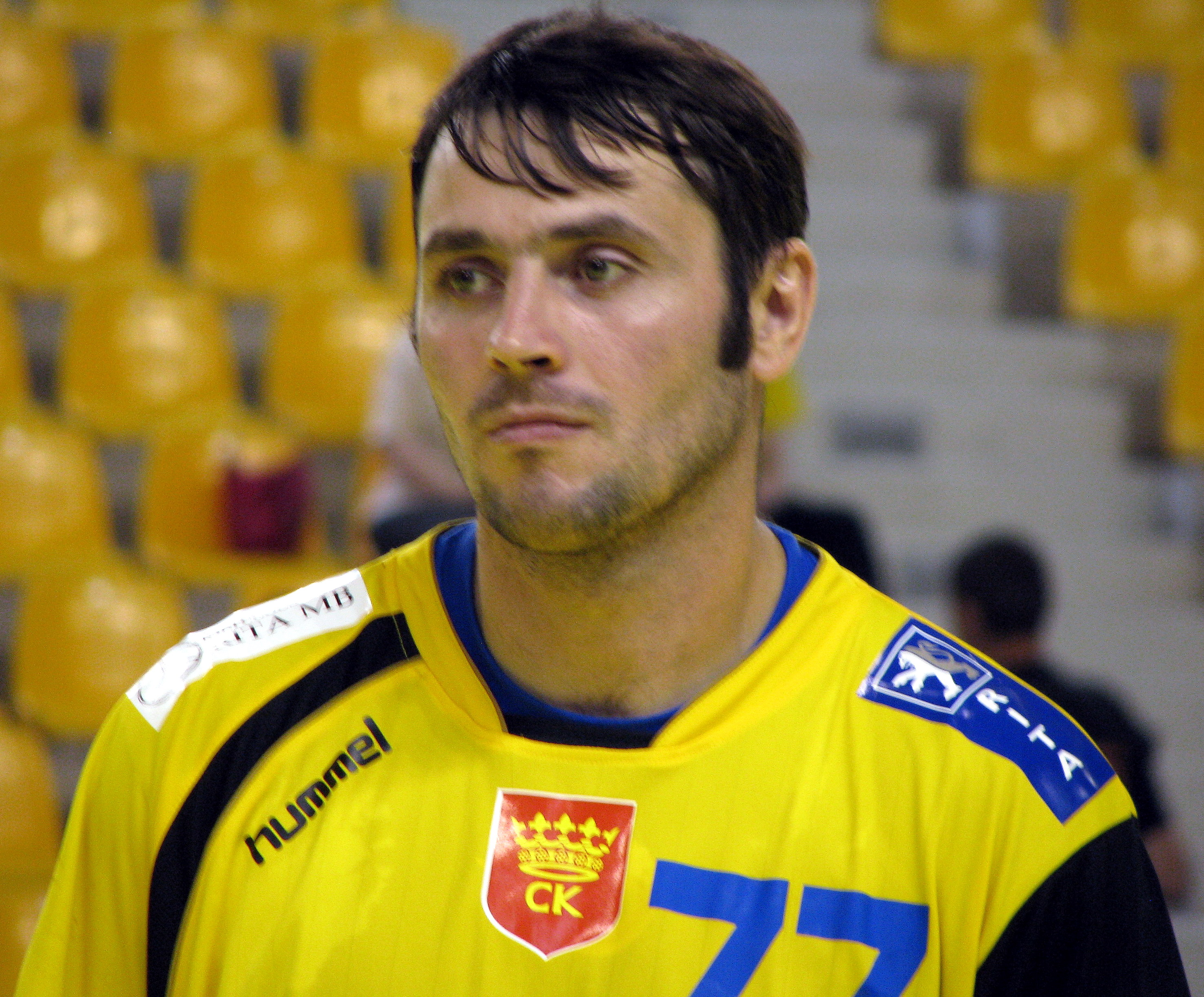

Personal information
- Full name: Vitaliy Yevhenovych Nat
- Nationality: Ukrainian
- Born: April 12, 1977 (age 49) Zaporizhia, Ukraine
- Height: 1.80 m (5 ft 11 in)

Sport
- Sport: Handball
- Position: Centre back
- Current club: SPR Chrobry Głogów (manager)

Senior clubs
- Years: Team
- –2002: ZTR Zaporizhia
- 2002–2003: RK Zagreb
- 2003–2007: ZTR Zaporizhia
- 2007–2009: Wisła Płock
- 2009–2011: Vive Kielce
- 2011–2014: NMC Górnik Zabrze
National team
Years	Team	Apps	(Gls)
1998–2014	Ukraine	75	(263)

Teams managed
- 2015–2019: ZTR Zaporizhia
- 2019–: SPR Chrobry Głogów

Vitaliy Yevhenovych Nat (Ukrainian: Віталій Євгенович Нат, born 12 April 1977) is a retired Ukrainian handball player and current coach of SPR Chrobry Głogów.

He competed at the 2010 European Men's Handball Championship in Austria.
