= 2010 European Men's Handball Championship qualification – Group 1 =

The qualification group 1 for the 2010 European Men's Handball Championship includes the national teams of Montenegro, Poland, Romania, Sweden and Turkey.

== Standings ==
Pos	Team	Pld	W	D	L	GF	GA	GD	Pts	Qualification	SWE	POL	MNE	ROM	TUR
1	Sweden	8	6	2	0	251	200	+51	14	Final tournament	—	27–24	29–24	26–26	42–18
2	Poland	8	5	1	2	242	198	+44	11	Final tournament	32–32	—	30–20	34–22	32–21
3	Montenegro	8	4	0	4	229	240	−11	8		29–33	23–31	—	35–33	33–26
4	Romania	8	3	1	4	242	247	−5	7		29–36	33–29	27–28	—	37–30
5	Turkey	8	0	0	8	193	272	−79	0		18–26	20–30	31–37	29–35	—

== Fixtures and results ==
October 29, 2008; 20:30 CET	Poland	30 : 20	Montenegro	Łuczniczka, Bydgoszcz; Attendance: 4,500; Referees: Togstad, Kristiansen (NOR)
October 29, 2008; 20:30 CET	Kostrzewa 6	(16:8)	Markovic 6	Łuczniczka, Bydgoszcz; Attendance: 4,500; Referees: Togstad, Kristiansen (NOR)
October 29, 2008; 20:30 CET	1× (yellow card) 3× (suspension)	Report	3× (yellow card) 4× (suspension)	Łuczniczka, Bydgoszcz; Attendance: 4,500; Referees: Togstad, Kristiansen (NOR)

October 30, 2008; 19:00 CET	Turkey	29 : 35	Romania	Antalya; Attendance: 500; Referees: Lovric, Petkovic (CRO)
October 30, 2008; 19:00 CET	Döne 7	(14:19)	Ghionea 13	Antalya; Attendance: 500; Referees: Lovric, Petkovic (CRO)
October 30, 2008; 19:00 CET	3× (yellow card) 7× (suspension)	Report	3× (yellow card) 2× (suspension)	Antalya; Attendance: 500; Referees: Lovric, Petkovic (CRO)

November 2, 2008; 11:00 CET	Romania	33 : 29	Poland	Romeo lamandi, Buzău; Attendance: 2,000; Referees: Dentz, Reibel (FRA)
November 2, 2008; 11:00 CET	Ghionea 13	(16:13)	Jurkiewicz 7	Romeo lamandi, Buzău; Attendance: 2,000; Referees: Dentz, Reibel (FRA)
November 2, 2008; 11:00 CET	3× (yellow card) 3× (suspension)	Report	3× (yellow card) 7× (suspension)	Romeo lamandi, Buzău; Attendance: 2,000; Referees: Dentz, Reibel (FRA)

November 2, 2008; 17:15 CET	Sweden	42 : 18	Turkey	Telenor Arena, Karlskrona; Attendance: 2,500; Referees: Liachovicius, Paskevicius (LTU)
November 2, 2008; 17:15 CET	Ekberg 12	(23:9)	Döne 6	Telenor Arena, Karlskrona; Attendance: 2,500; Referees: Liachovicius, Paskevicius (LTU)
November 2, 2008; 17:15 CET	3× (yellow card) 2× (suspension)	Report	3× (yellow card) 4× (suspension)	Telenor Arena, Karlskrona; Attendance: 2,500; Referees: Liachovicius, Paskevicius (LTU)

November 26, 2008; 18:00 CET	Montenegro	35 : 33	Romania	Sportski Centar Nikšić, Nikšić; Attendance: 3,000; Referees: Vakula, Liudovyk (UKR)
November 26, 2008; 18:00 CET	Roganovic 8	(21:15)	Petrea 5	Sportski Centar Nikšić, Nikšić; Attendance: 3,000; Referees: Vakula, Liudovyk (UKR)
November 26, 2008; 18:00 CET	3× (yellow card) 8× (suspension)	Report	3× (yellow card) 2× (suspension)	Sportski Centar Nikšić, Nikšić; Attendance: 3,000; Referees: Vakula, Liudovyk (UKR)

November 27, 2008; 19:00 CET	Sweden	27 : 24	Poland	Färs&Frosta Sparbank Arena, Lund; Attendance: 3,400; Referees: Lemme, Ullrich (GER)
November 27, 2008; 19:00 CET	Källman 8	(11:12)	Tłuczyński 7	Färs&Frosta Sparbank Arena, Lund; Attendance: 3,400; Referees: Lemme, Ullrich (GER)
November 27, 2008; 19:00 CET	3× (yellow card) 3× (suspension)	Report	3× (yellow card) 5× (suspension)	Färs&Frosta Sparbank Arena, Lund; Attendance: 3,400; Referees: Lemme, Ullrich (GER)

November 29, 2008; 19:00 CET	Turkey	31 : 37	Montenegro	Rize; Attendance: 1,000; Referees: Poladenko, Chernega (RUS)
November 29, 2008; 19:00 CET	Döne 8	(16:19)	Osmajic 12	Rize; Attendance: 1,000; Referees: Poladenko, Chernega (RUS)
November 29, 2008; 19:00 CET	3× (yellow card) 6× (suspension)	Report	3× (yellow card) 7× (suspension)	Rize; Attendance: 1,000; Referees: Poladenko, Chernega (RUS)

November 30, 2008; 11:00 CET	Romania	29 : 36	Sweden	Sala Polivalenta Resita, Reșița; Attendance: 1,700; Referees: Repensek, Pozeznik (SLO)
November 30, 2008; 11:00 CET	Ghionea 10	(15:19)	Doder 10	Sala Polivalenta Resita, Reșița; Attendance: 1,700; Referees: Repensek, Pozeznik (SLO)
November 30, 2008; 11:00 CET	3× (yellow card) 3× (suspension)	Report	3× (yellow card) 5× (suspension)	Sala Polivalenta Resita, Reșița; Attendance: 1,700; Referees: Repensek, Pozeznik (SLO)

March 18, 2009; 18:00 CET	Montenegro	29 : 33	Sweden	Sportski Centar Nikšić, Nikšić; Attendance: 3,000; Referees: Buy, Pichon (FRA)
March 18, 2009; 18:00 CET	Markovic 8	(14:19)	Larholm 8	Sportski Centar Nikšić, Nikšić; Attendance: 3,000; Referees: Buy, Pichon (FRA)
March 18, 2009; 18:00 CET	3× (yellow card) 3× (suspension)	Report	3× (yellow card) 2× (suspension)	Sportski Centar Nikšić, Nikšić; Attendance: 3,000; Referees: Buy, Pichon (FRA)

March 19, 2009; 19:00 CET	Turkey	20 : 30	Poland	Mersin; Attendance: 800; Referees: Kouz, Zhoba (UKR)
March 19, 2009; 19:00 CET	Döne 5	(11:16)	Tłuczyński 6	Mersin; Attendance: 800; Referees: Kouz, Zhoba (UKR)
March 19, 2009; 19:00 CET	3× (yellow card) 5× (suspension)	Report	3× (yellow card) 4× (suspension)	Mersin; Attendance: 800; Referees: Kouz, Zhoba (UKR)

March 22, 2009; 15:00 CET	Poland	32 : 21	Turkey	Hala Urania, Olsztyn; Attendance: 2,000; Referees: Meyer, Stalder (SUI)
March 22, 2009; 15:00 CET	Bielecki 6	(18:9)	Yalciner 7	Hala Urania, Olsztyn; Attendance: 2,000; Referees: Meyer, Stalder (SUI)
March 22, 2009; 15:00 CET	3× (yellow card) 2× (suspension)	Report	3× (yellow card) 5× (suspension)	Hala Urania, Olsztyn; Attendance: 2,000; Referees: Meyer, Stalder (SUI)

March 22, 2009; 17:15 CET	Sweden	29 : 24	Montenegro	Norrköping; Attendance: 4,200; Referees: C. Kekes, P. Kekes (HUN)
March 22, 2009; 17:15 CET	Ekberg 6	(16:11)	Osmajic 7	Norrköping; Attendance: 4,200; Referees: C. Kekes, P. Kekes (HUN)
March 22, 2009; 17:15 CET	3× (yellow card) 4× (suspension)	Report	3× (yellow card) 4× (suspension)	Norrköping; Attendance: 4,200; Referees: C. Kekes, P. Kekes (HUN)

June 10, 2009; 20:15 CET	Montenegro	33 : 26	Turkey	Sportski Centar Nikšić, Nikšić; Attendance: 3,000; Referees: Veber, Pangerc (SLO)
June 10, 2009; 20:15 CET	Osmajic 7	(14:13)	Döne 9	Sportski Centar Nikšić, Nikšić; Attendance: 3,000; Referees: Veber, Pangerc (SLO)
June 10, 2009; 20:15 CET	3× (yellow card) 3× (suspension)	Report	2× (yellow card) 5× (suspension)	Sportski Centar Nikšić, Nikšić; Attendance: 3,000; Referees: Veber, Pangerc (SLO)

June 11, 2009; 19:15 CET	Sweden	26 : 26	Romania	Färs&Frosta Sparbank Arena, Lund; Attendance: 3,000; Referees: Liachovicius, Paskevicius (LTU)
June 11, 2009; 19:15 CET	Ekberg 5	(10:12)	Ghionea 9	Färs&Frosta Sparbank Arena, Lund; Attendance: 3,000; Referees: Liachovicius, Paskevicius (LTU)
June 11, 2009; 19:15 CET	3× (yellow card) 4× (suspension)	Report	3× (yellow card) 5× (suspension)	Färs&Frosta Sparbank Arena, Lund; Attendance: 3,000; Referees: Liachovicius, Paskevicius (LTU)

June 13, 2009; 15:00 CET	Poland	32 : 32	Sweden	Hala Stulecia, Wrocław; Attendance: 4,000; Referees: Lazaar, Reveret (FRA)
June 13, 2009; 15:00 CET	Jurecki 7	(13:15)	Doder 7	Hala Stulecia, Wrocław; Attendance: 4,000; Referees: Lazaar, Reveret (FRA)
June 13, 2009; 15:00 CET	3× (yellow card) 8× (suspension)	Report	3× (yellow card) 4× (suspension)	Hala Stulecia, Wrocław; Attendance: 4,000; Referees: Lazaar, Reveret (FRA)

June 13, 2009; 16:00 CET	Romania	27 : 28	Montenegro	Sala Polivalentă Ioan Kunst-Ghermănescu, Bucharest; Attendance: 2,000; Referees: Hansen, Pettersen (NOR)
June 13, 2009; 16:00 CET	Irimescu 8	(10:12)	Kapisoda 7	Sala Polivalentă Ioan Kunst-Ghermănescu, Bucharest; Attendance: 2,000; Referees: Hansen, Pettersen (NOR)
June 13, 2009; 16:00 CET	3× (yellow card) 2× (suspension)	Report	3× (yellow card) 7× (suspension)	Sala Polivalentă Ioan Kunst-Ghermănescu, Bucharest; Attendance: 2,000; Referees: Hansen, Pettersen (NOR)

June 17, 2009; 18:00 CET	Montenegro	23 : 31	Poland	Sportski Centar Nikšić, Nikšić; Attendance: 3,000; Referees: Dobrovits, Tajok (HUN)
June 17, 2009; 18:00 CET	Roganovic 6	(8:15)	Tłuczyński 7	Sportski Centar Nikšić, Nikšić; Attendance: 3,000; Referees: Dobrovits, Tajok (HUN)
June 17, 2009; 18:00 CET	3× (yellow card) 3× (suspension)	Report	3× (yellow card) 3× (suspension)	Sportski Centar Nikšić, Nikšić; Attendance: 3,000; Referees: Dobrovits, Tajok (HUN)

June 17, 2009; 19:00 CET	Romania	37 : 30	Turkey	Sala Polivalenta Resita, Reșița; Attendance: 1,500; Referees: Argyrou, Loizou (CYP)
June 17, 2009; 19:00 CET	Csepreghi 8	(21:15)	Döne 7	Sala Polivalenta Resita, Reșița; Attendance: 1,500; Referees: Argyrou, Loizou (CYP)
June 17, 2009; 19:00 CET	2× (yellow card) 3× (suspension)	Report	3× (yellow card) 4× (suspension)	Sala Polivalenta Resita, Reșița; Attendance: 1,500; Referees: Argyrou, Loizou (CYP)

June 20, 2009; 15:00 CET	Poland	34 : 22	Romania	Hala Legionów, Kielce; Attendance: 3,500; Referees: Van der Helm, Wiebrands (NED)
June 20, 2009; 15:00 CET	Bielecki 6	(17:8)	Ghionea 5	Hala Legionów, Kielce; Attendance: 3,500; Referees: Van der Helm, Wiebrands (NED)
June 20, 2009; 15:00 CET	3× (yellow card) 4× (suspension)	Report	2× (yellow card) 4× (suspension)	Hala Legionów, Kielce; Attendance: 3,500; Referees: Van der Helm, Wiebrands (NED)

June 21, 2009; 19:00 CET	Turkey	18 : 26	Sweden	Antalya; Attendance: 300; Referees: Hascik, Otapka (SVK)
June 21, 2009; 19:00 CET	Boyar 6	(8:10)	Petersen 7	Antalya; Attendance: 300; Referees: Hascik, Otapka (SVK)
June 21, 2009; 19:00 CET	3× (yellow card) 6× (suspension)	Report	3× (yellow card) 7× (suspension)	Antalya; Attendance: 300; Referees: Hascik, Otapka (SVK)
