= Mirsad =

- Gender: Male

Other gender
- Feminine: Mirsada

Origin
- Meaning: Lookout, observation, peace now

Other names
- Variant forms: Mersad, Mersed

Mirsad is a male given name.

In the Balkans, Mirsad is popular among Bosniaks in the former Yugoslav nations. The name is also spelled as Mersad or Mersed. There is also a female equivalent of the name in this region: Mirsada/Mersada (for example, Mirsada Burić and Mersada Bećirspahić).

In Arabic, Mirsad (مِرْصَادْ) translates to lookout and observation. It is also interpreted as a local Bosnian name, derived from mir- meaning "peace" and sad meaning "now," similar to the interpretation of the name Damir.

== Given name ==
- Mirsad Begić, Slovene sculptor of Bosnian origin
- Mirsad Bektić, Bosnian-American mix martial artist
- Mirsad Baljić, Yugoslav footballer
- Mirsad Bešlija, Bosnian footballer
- Mirsad Fazlagić, Bosnian footballer
- Mirsad Hibić, Bosnian footballer
- Mirsad Huseinovic, American soccer player
- Mirsad Jonuz, Macedonian footballer
- Mirsad Mijadinoski, Macedonian footballer
- Mirsad Terzić, Bosnian footballer
- Mirsad Türkcan, Turkish basketball player of Bosnian/Serbian origin

== See also ==
- Mirsad-1, small reconnaissance drone
