= 2010 European Men's Handball Championship qualification – Group 6 =

The qualification group 6 for the 2010 European Men's Handball Championship included the national teams of Czech Republic, France, Latvia, Luxembourg and Portugal. France and the Czech Republic qualified to the final tournament.

== Standings ==
Pos	Team	Pld	W	D	L	GF	GA	GD	Pts	Qualification	FRA	CZE	POR	LVA	LUX
1	France	8	6	0	2	251	192	+59	12	Final tournament	—	32–25	36–23	34–22	35–18
2	Czech Republic	8	6	0	2	255	221	+34	12	Final tournament	32–29	—	30–26	41–29	30–19
3	Portugal	8	5	0	3	234	229	+5	10		24–31	31–28	—	33–31	33–22
4	Latvia	8	3	0	5	227	249	−22	6		27–24	31–34	25–31	—	31–29
5	Luxembourg	8	0	0	8	182	258	−76	0		21–30	24–35	26–33	23–31	—

== Fixtures and results ==
October 29, 2008; 20:00 CET	Latvia	31:34	Czech Republic	Olympic Sport Center, Riga; Attendance: 600; Referees: Reisinger, Kaschütz (AUT)
October 29, 2008; 20:00 CET	Uščins 8	(18:18)	Jícha 13	Olympic Sport Center, Riga; Attendance: 600; Referees: Reisinger, Kaschütz (AUT)
October 29, 2008; 20:00 CET	3× (yellow card) 5× (suspension)	Report	3× (yellow card) 4× (suspension)	Olympic Sport Center, Riga; Attendance: 600; Referees: Reisinger, Kaschütz (AUT)

October 30, 2008; 20:15 CET	Luxembourg	21:30	France	Centre Sportif National d'Coque, Luxembourg; Attendance: 5,000; Referees: Bebetsos, Meimaridis (GRE)
October 30, 2008; 20:15 CET	Poeckes 6	(13:15)	Ostertag 6	Centre Sportif National d'Coque, Luxembourg; Attendance: 5,000; Referees: Bebetsos, Meimaridis (GRE)
October 30, 2008; 20:15 CET	2× (yellow card) 4× (suspension)	Report	2× (suspension)	Centre Sportif National d'Coque, Luxembourg; Attendance: 5,000; Referees: Bebetsos, Meimaridis (GRE)

November 2, 2008; 15:00 CET	Czech Republic	32:29	France	Sportovní hala Vodova, Brno; Attendance: 1,000; Referees: Visekruna, Stanojevic (SRB)
November 2, 2008; 15:00 CET	Jícha 9	(13:11)	Sorhaindo 6	Sportovní hala Vodova, Brno; Attendance: 1,000; Referees: Visekruna, Stanojevic (SRB)
November 2, 2008; 15:00 CET	3× (yellow card) 2× (suspension)	Report	3× (yellow card) 2× (suspension)	Sportovní hala Vodova, Brno; Attendance: 1,000; Referees: Visekruna, Stanojevic (SRB)

November 2, 2008; 17:00 CET	Luxembourg	23:31	Latvia	Centre Sportif National d'Coque, Luxembourg; Attendance: 1,500; Referees: Constantinou, Mouttas (CYP)
November 2, 2008; 17:00 CET	Poeckes 8	(14:10)	Jurdz, Valkovskis 7	Centre Sportif National d'Coque, Luxembourg; Attendance: 1,500; Referees: Constantinou, Mouttas (CYP)
November 2, 2008; 17:00 CET	3× (yellow card) 6× (suspension)	Report	3× (yellow card) 5× (suspension)	Centre Sportif National d'Coque, Luxembourg; Attendance: 1,500; Referees: Constantinou, Mouttas (CYP)

November 26, 2008; 20:30 CET	Portugal	33:31	Latvia	Viseu; Attendance: 2,500; Referees: Lovric, Petkovic (CRO)
November 26, 2008; 20:30 CET	three players 5	(14:13)	Karipidis 8	Viseu; Attendance: 2,500; Referees: Lovric, Petkovic (CRO)
November 26, 2008; 20:30 CET	3× (yellow card) 7× (suspension) 1× (red card)	Report	3× (yellow card) 4× (suspension)	Viseu; Attendance: 2,500; Referees: Lovric, Petkovic (CRO)

November 27, 2008; 20:15 CET	Luxembourg	24:35	Czech Republic	Centre Sportif National d'Coque, Luxembourg; Attendance: 1,200; Referees: Veber, Pangerc (SLO)
November 27, 2008; 20:15 CET	Link 6	(10:16)	Jícha, Zdráhala 7	Centre Sportif National d'Coque, Luxembourg; Attendance: 1,200; Referees: Veber, Pangerc (SLO)
November 27, 2008; 20:15 CET	3× (yellow card) 3× (suspension)	Report	3× (yellow card) 3× (suspension)	Centre Sportif National d'Coque, Luxembourg; Attendance: 1,200; Referees: Veber, Pangerc (SLO)

November 30, 2008; 14:10 CET	Latvia	25:31	Portugal	Olympic Sport Center, Riga; Attendance: 500; Referees: Johansson, Kliko (SWE)
November 30, 2008; 14:10 CET	Jurdz, Uščins 7	(11:17)	Solha 8	Olympic Sport Center, Riga; Attendance: 500; Referees: Johansson, Kliko (SWE)
November 30, 2008; 14:10 CET	2× (yellow card) 3× (suspension)	Report	2× (yellow card) 5× (suspension) 1× (red card)	Olympic Sport Center, Riga; Attendance: 500; Referees: Johansson, Kliko (SWE)

November 30, 2008; 14:30 CET	Czech Republic	30:19	Luxembourg	Sport Hall Chemik, Lovosice; Attendance: 1,000; Referees: Evers, Kums (BEL)
November 30, 2008; 14:30 CET	Jícha 7	(15:11)	Decker 6	Sport Hall Chemik, Lovosice; Attendance: 1,000; Referees: Evers, Kums (BEL)
November 30, 2008; 14:30 CET	2× (yellow card) 5× (suspension)	Report	2× (yellow card) 6× (suspension)	Sport Hall Chemik, Lovosice; Attendance: 1,000; Referees: Evers, Kums (BEL)

March 18, 2009; 20:10 CET	Latvia	31:29	Luxembourg	Olympic Sport Center, Riga; Attendance: 500; Referees: Shal, Asgarov
March 18, 2009; 20:10 CET	Jurdz 7	(16:17)	Link 6	Olympic Sport Center, Riga; Attendance: 500; Referees: Shal, Asgarov
March 18, 2009; 20:10 CET	3× (yellow card) 3× (suspension)	Report	3× (yellow card) 3× (suspension)	Olympic Sport Center, Riga; Attendance: 500; Referees: Shal, Asgarov

March 19, 2009; 20:30 CET	Portugal	24:31	France	Póvoa de Varzim; Attendance: 3,000; Referees: Korres, Migas (GRE)
March 19, 2009; 20:30 CET	Costa 5	(12:18)	Fernandez 6	Póvoa de Varzim; Attendance: 3,000; Referees: Korres, Migas (GRE)
March 19, 2009; 20:30 CET	3× (yellow card) 1× (suspension)	Report	3× (yellow card) 5× (suspension)	Póvoa de Varzim; Attendance: 3,000; Referees: Korres, Migas (GRE)

March 22, 2009; 14:00 CET	France	34:22	Latvia	Pau; Attendance: 6,000; Referees: Sivak, Dvorsky (SVK)
March 22, 2009; 14:00 CET	Fernandez 8	(21:13)	Jurdz, Pavlovičs 7	Pau; Attendance: 6,000; Referees: Sivak, Dvorsky (SVK)
March 22, 2009; 14:00 CET	3× (yellow card) 4× (suspension)	Report	3× (yellow card) 4× (suspension)	Pau; Attendance: 6,000; Referees: Sivak, Dvorsky (SVK)

March 22, 2009; 18:45 CET	Luxembourg	26:33	Portugal	Centre Sportif National d'Coque, Luxembourg; Attendance: 2,000; Referees: Scevola, Alperan (ITA)
March 22, 2009; 18:45 CET	Link, Muller 6	(13:14)	Tavares 9	Centre Sportif National d'Coque, Luxembourg; Attendance: 2,000; Referees: Scevola, Alperan (ITA)
March 22, 2009; 18:45 CET	3× (yellow card) 6× (suspension)	Report	3× (yellow card) 3× (suspension)	Centre Sportif National d'Coque, Luxembourg; Attendance: 2,000; Referees: Scevola, Alperan (ITA)

June 10, 2009; 18:00 CET	Czech Republic	30:26	Portugal	Sportovní Hala TJ Lokomotiva, Plzeň; Attendance: 2,000; Referees: Pavel, State (ROU)
June 10, 2009; 18:00 CET	Filip 8	(16:12)	Solha 8	Sportovní Hala TJ Lokomotiva, Plzeň; Attendance: 2,000; Referees: Pavel, State (ROU)
June 10, 2009; 18:00 CET	3× (yellow card) 4× (suspension)	Report	3× (yellow card) 3× (suspension)	Sportovní Hala TJ Lokomotiva, Plzeň; Attendance: 2,000; Referees: Pavel, State (ROU)

June 10, 2009; 19:30 CET	France	35:18	Luxembourg	Montbéliard; Attendance: 5,000; Referees: Di Domenico, Fornasier (ITA)
June 10, 2009; 19:30 CET	four players 4	(18:8)	Link 5	Montbéliard; Attendance: 5,000; Referees: Di Domenico, Fornasier (ITA)
June 10, 2009; 19:30 CET	3× (yellow card) 1× (suspension)	Report	3× (yellow card) 3× (suspension)	Montbéliard; Attendance: 5,000; Referees: Di Domenico, Fornasier (ITA)

June 13, 2009; 17:00 CET	Portugal	33:22	Luxembourg	Moimenta da Beira; Attendance: 2,000; Referees: Ben-Dan, Faran (ISR)
June 13, 2009; 17:00 CET	Andrade 11	(15:9)	Ley 6	Moimenta da Beira; Attendance: 2,000; Referees: Ben-Dan, Faran (ISR)
June 13, 2009; 17:00 CET	3× (yellow card) 3× (suspension)	Report	3× (yellow card) 8× (suspension)	Moimenta da Beira; Attendance: 2,000; Referees: Ben-Dan, Faran (ISR)

June 14, 2009; 17:30 CET	France	32:25	Czech Republic	Lyon; Attendance: 5,000; Referees: Cvetko, Kavalar (SLO)
June 14, 2009; 17:30 CET	Fernandez 7	(16:10)	Zdráhala 7	Lyon; Attendance: 5,000; Referees: Cvetko, Kavalar (SLO)
June 14, 2009; 17:30 CET	3× (yellow card) 2× (suspension)	Report	3× (yellow card) 3× (suspension)	Lyon; Attendance: 5,000; Referees: Cvetko, Kavalar (SLO)

June 17, 2009; 17:00 CET	Czech Republic	41:29	Latvia	Arena Sparta Podvinny Mlyn, Prague; Attendance: 2,500; Referees: Bashev, Dobrev (BUL)
June 17, 2009; 17:00 CET	Filip 9	(22:14)	Jurdz 8	Arena Sparta Podvinny Mlyn, Prague; Attendance: 2,500; Referees: Bashev, Dobrev (BUL)
June 17, 2009; 17:00 CET	2× (yellow card) 5× (suspension)	Report	3× (yellow card) 2× (suspension)	Arena Sparta Podvinny Mlyn, Prague; Attendance: 2,500; Referees: Bashev, Dobrev (BUL)

June 17, 2009; 19:30 CET	France	36:23	Portugal	Nice; Attendance: 5,000; Referees: San Jose, Murcia (ESP)
June 17, 2009; 19:30 CET	Karabatić 7	(22:10)	Tavares 9	Nice; Attendance: 5,000; Referees: San Jose, Murcia (ESP)
June 17, 2009; 19:30 CET	3× (yellow card) 1× (suspension)	Report	3× (yellow card) 1× (suspension)	Nice; Attendance: 5,000; Referees: San Jose, Murcia (ESP)

June 20, 2009; 17:00 CET	Portugal	31:28	Czech Republic	Fafe; Attendance: 2,000; Referees: Gjeding, Hansen (DEN)
June 20, 2009; 17:00 CET	Magalhães 6	(14:9)	Cip 6	Fafe; Attendance: 2,000; Referees: Gjeding, Hansen (DEN)
June 20, 2009; 17:00 CET	2× (yellow card) 5× (suspension)	Report	3× (yellow card) 5× (suspension)	Fafe; Attendance: 2,000; Referees: Gjeding, Hansen (DEN)

June 21, 2009; 14:10 CET	Latvia	27:24	France	Olympic Sport Center, Riga; Attendance: 500; Referees: Bonifert, Oláh (HUN)
June 21, 2009; 14:10 CET	Tihanovs 8	(11:8)	Marroux 5	Olympic Sport Center, Riga; Attendance: 500; Referees: Bonifert, Oláh (HUN)
June 21, 2009; 14:10 CET	3× (yellow card) 6× (suspension)	Report	3× (yellow card) 6× (suspension)	Olympic Sport Center, Riga; Attendance: 500; Referees: Bonifert, Oláh (HUN)
