= 2010 European Men's Handball Championship qualification – Group 4 =

The qualification group 4 for the 2010 European Men's Handball Championship includes the national teams of Croatia, Finland, Greece, Hungary and Slovakia.

== Standings ==
Pos	Team	Pld	W	D	L	GF	GA	GD	Pts	Qualification	CRO	HUN	SVK	GRE	FIN
1	Croatia	8	7	0	1	252	180	+72	14	Final tournament	—	26–25	34–21	32–20	39–20
2	Hungary	8	6	0	2	241	179	+62	12	Final tournament	30–28	—	29–30	32–19	34–15
3	Slovakia	8	4	0	4	214	215	−1	8		26–30	19–30	—	28–27	34–21
4	Greece	8	3	0	5	199	223	−24	6		24–29	21–27	27–24	—	31–26
5	Finland	8	0	0	8	159	268	−109	0		14–34	21–34	17–32	25–30	—

== Fixtures and results ==
October 29, 2008; 18:00 CET	Croatia	39 : 20	Finland	Dom Sportova, Zagreb; Attendance: 6,000; Referees: Malasinskas, Gecevicius (LTU)
October 29, 2008; 18:00 CET	Duvnjak 9	(20:10)	Karlsson 5	Dom Sportova, Zagreb; Attendance: 6,000; Referees: Malasinskas, Gecevicius (LTU)
October 29, 2008; 18:00 CET	3× (yellow card) 3× (suspension)	Report	3× (yellow card) 4× (suspension)	Dom Sportova, Zagreb; Attendance: 6,000; Referees: Malasinskas, Gecevicius (LTU)

October 29, 2008; 18:00 EET	Greece	21 : 27	Hungary	Dimokritus University, Komotini; Attendance: 2,200; Referees: Vodopivec, Krasna (SLO)
October 29, 2008; 18:00 EET	Chalkidis 6	(9:16)	G. Iváncsik 7	Dimokritus University, Komotini; Attendance: 2,200; Referees: Vodopivec, Krasna (SLO)
October 29, 2008; 18:00 EET	3× (yellow card) 6× (suspension) 1× (red card)	Report	3× (yellow card) 7× (suspension) 1× (red card)	Dimokritus University, Komotini; Attendance: 2,200; Referees: Vodopivec, Krasna (SLO)

November 2, 2008; 14:00 EET	Finland	25 : 30	Greece	Vantaa Energia Arena, Vantaa; Attendance: 1,100; Referees: Johansson, Kliko (SWE)
November 2, 2008; 14:00 EET	Kangas 6	(10:12)	Alvanos 9	Vantaa Energia Arena, Vantaa; Attendance: 1,100; Referees: Johansson, Kliko (SWE)
November 2, 2008; 14:00 EET	3× (yellow card) 1× (suspension)	Report	3× (yellow card) 4× (suspension)	Vantaa Energia Arena, Vantaa; Attendance: 1,100; Referees: Johansson, Kliko (SWE)

November 2, 2008; 13:30 CET	Hungary	30 : 28	Croatia	Veszprém Aréna, Veszprém; Attendance: 5,000; Referees: Lemme, Ullrich (GER)
November 2, 2008; 13:30 CET	Gál 9	(15:16)	Zrnic 9	Veszprém Aréna, Veszprém; Attendance: 5,000; Referees: Lemme, Ullrich (GER)
November 2, 2008; 13:30 CET	3× (yellow card) 2× (suspension)	Report	3× (yellow card) 2× (suspension)	Veszprém Aréna, Veszprém; Attendance: 5,000; Referees: Lemme, Ullrich (GER)

November 26, 2008; 17:30 CET	Slovakia	28 : 27	Greece	Hlohovec; Attendance: 1,800; Referees: Gjeding, Hansen (DEN)
November 26, 2008; 17:30 CET	Valo 10	(15:14)	Karipidis 13	Hlohovec; Attendance: 1,800; Referees: Gjeding, Hansen (DEN)
November 26, 2008; 17:30 CET	3× (yellow card) 7× (suspension)	Report	2× (yellow card) 5× (suspension)	Hlohovec; Attendance: 1,800; Referees: Gjeding, Hansen (DEN)

November 27, 2008; 18:30 EET	Finland	21 : 34	Hungary	Vantaa Energia Arena, Vantaa; Attendance: 800; Referees: Mazeika, Gatelis (LTU)
November 27, 2008; 18:30 EET	Kangas 9	(9:15)	Putics 8	Vantaa Energia Arena, Vantaa; Attendance: 800; Referees: Mazeika, Gatelis (LTU)
November 27, 2008; 18:30 EET	3× (yellow card) 3× (suspension)	Report	3× (yellow card) 3× (suspension)	Vantaa Energia Arena, Vantaa; Attendance: 800; Referees: Mazeika, Gatelis (LTU)

November 30, 2008; 13:45 CET	Hungary	34 : 15	Finland	Nyíregyházi Sportcsarnok, Nyiregyháza; Attendance: 4,000; Referees: Gousko, Repkin (BLR)
November 30, 2008; 13:45 CET	Putics 11	(17:11)	Tamminen 5	Nyíregyházi Sportcsarnok, Nyiregyháza; Attendance: 4,000; Referees: Gousko, Repkin (BLR)
November 30, 2008; 13:45 CET	3× (yellow card) 3× (suspension)	Report	3× (yellow card) 4× (suspension)	Nyíregyházi Sportcsarnok, Nyiregyháza; Attendance: 4,000; Referees: Gousko, Repkin (BLR)

November 30, 2008; 15:30 EET	Greece	27 : 24	Slovakia	Dimokritus University, Komotini; Attendance: 1,500; Referees: Franco, Rodriguez (ESP)
November 30, 2008; 15:30 EET	Karipidis 9	(16:10)	Valo 9	Dimokritus University, Komotini; Attendance: 1,500; Referees: Franco, Rodriguez (ESP)
November 30, 2008; 15:30 EET	2× (yellow card) 5× (suspension)	Report	2× (yellow card) 6× (suspension)	Dimokritus University, Komotini; Attendance: 1,500; Referees: Franco, Rodriguez (ESP)

March 18, 2009; 17:30 CET	Slovakia	26 : 30	Croatia	Hlohovec; Attendance: 2,000; Referees: Dinu, Din (ROU)
March 18, 2009; 17:30 CET	Šulc 8	(11:17)	Lacković 6	Hlohovec; Attendance: 2,000; Referees: Dinu, Din (ROU)
March 18, 2009; 17:30 CET	3× (yellow card) 4× (suspension)	Report	3× (yellow card) 1× (suspension)	Hlohovec; Attendance: 2,000; Referees: Dinu, Din (ROU)

March 18, 2009; 18:00 EET	Greece	31 : 26	Finland	Dimokritus University, Komotini; Attendance: 3,000; Referees: Cohen, Peretz (ISR)
March 18, 2009; 18:00 EET	Karipidis 11	(15:14)	Kangas 8	Dimokritus University, Komotini; Attendance: 3,000; Referees: Cohen, Peretz (ISR)
March 18, 2009; 18:00 EET	3× (yellow card) 4× (suspension)	Report	3× (yellow card) 4× (suspension)	Dimokritus University, Komotini; Attendance: 3,000; Referees: Cohen, Peretz (ISR)

March 21, 2009; 14:00 CET	Finland	17 : 32	Slovakia	Vantaa Energia Arena, Vantaa; Attendance: 1,300; Referees: Baranowski, Lemanowicz (POL)
March 21, 2009; 14:00 CET	four players 3	(7:14)	Pekar, Urban 5	Vantaa Energia Arena, Vantaa; Attendance: 1,300; Referees: Baranowski, Lemanowicz (POL)
March 21, 2009; 14:00 CET	3× (yellow card) 6× (suspension)	Report	2× (yellow card) 8× (suspension) 1× (red card)	Vantaa Energia Arena, Vantaa; Attendance: 1,300; Referees: Baranowski, Lemanowicz (POL)

March 21, 2009; 20:15 CET	Croatia	32 : 20	Greece	Gradski vrt Hall, Osijek; Attendance: 3,500; Referees: Bashmak, Frolov (RUS)
March 21, 2009; 20:15 CET	Zrnic 7	(19:9)	four players 3	Gradski vrt Hall, Osijek; Attendance: 3,500; Referees: Bashmak, Frolov (RUS)
March 21, 2009; 20:15 CET	3× (yellow card) 1× (suspension)	Report	2× (yellow card) 3× (suspension)	Gradski vrt Hall, Osijek; Attendance: 3,500; Referees: Bashmak, Frolov (RUS)

June 9, 2009; 20:00 CET	Finland	14 : 34	Croatia	Vantaa Energia Arena, Vantaa; Attendance: 1,600
June 9, 2009; 20:00 CET	Tamminen 4	(8:15)	Horvat 6	Vantaa Energia Arena, Vantaa; Attendance: 1,600
June 9, 2009; 20:00 CET	3× (yellow card) 1× (suspension)	Report	3× (yellow card) 2× (suspension)	Vantaa Energia Arena, Vantaa; Attendance: 1,600

June 10, 2009; 18:00 CET	Hungary	29 : 30	Slovakia	Arena Savaria, Szombathely; Attendance: 2,500; Referees: Nikolov, Nachevski (MKD)
June 10, 2009; 18:00 CET	L. Nagy 9	(15:12)	Kopčo, Šulc 7	Arena Savaria, Szombathely; Attendance: 2,500; Referees: Nikolov, Nachevski (MKD)
June 10, 2009; 18:00 CET	3× (yellow card) 2× (suspension)	Report	3× (yellow card) 2× (suspension)	Arena Savaria, Szombathely; Attendance: 2,500; Referees: Nikolov, Nachevski (MKD)

June 13, 2009; 18:00 CET	Slovakia	34 : 21	Finland	Hlohovec; Attendance: 1,200; Referees: Mäkinen, Jonsson (SWE)
June 13, 2009; 18:00 CET	Pekár, T. Straňovský 5	(17:10)	Tamminen 9	Hlohovec; Attendance: 1,200; Referees: Mäkinen, Jonsson (SWE)
June 13, 2009; 18:00 CET	2× (yellow card) 1× (suspension)	Report	3× (yellow card) 4× (suspension)	Hlohovec; Attendance: 1,200; Referees: Mäkinen, Jonsson (SWE)

June 14, 2009; 20:00 CET	Croatia	26: 25	Hungary	Krešimir Ćosić Hall, Zadar; Attendance: 4,500; Referees: Visekruna, Stanojevic (SRB)
June 14, 2009; 20:00 CET	Horvat 5	(12:9)	Ilyés 6	Krešimir Ćosić Hall, Zadar; Attendance: 4,500; Referees: Visekruna, Stanojevic (SRB)
June 14, 2009; 20:00 CET	3× (yellow card) 1× (suspension)	Report	3× (yellow card) 4× (suspension)	Krešimir Ćosić Hall, Zadar; Attendance: 4,500; Referees: Visekruna, Stanojevic (SRB)

June 17, 2009; 20:00 CET	Croatia	34:21	Slovakia	Krešimir Ćosić Hall, Zadar; Attendance: 4,500; Referees: R. Methe, B. Methe (GER)
June 17, 2009; 20:00 CET	Duvnjak 9	(17:11)	Petko 6	Krešimir Ćosić Hall, Zadar; Attendance: 4,500; Referees: R. Methe, B. Methe (GER)
June 17, 2009; 20:00 CET	3× (yellow card) 6× (suspension)	Report	2× (yellow card) 7× (suspension)	Krešimir Ćosić Hall, Zadar; Attendance: 4,500; Referees: R. Methe, B. Methe (GER)

June 18, 2009; 18:00 CET	Hungary	32:19	Greece	Békéscsabai Városi Sportcsarnok, Békéscsaba; Attendance: 2,300; Referees: Abrahamsen, Kristiansen (NOR)
June 18, 2009; 18:00 CET	G. Iváncsik 9	(16:8)	Chalkidis 7	Békéscsabai Városi Sportcsarnok, Békéscsaba; Attendance: 2,300; Referees: Abrahamsen, Kristiansen (NOR)
June 18, 2009; 18:00 CET	5× (suspension)	Report	2× (suspension)	Békéscsabai Városi Sportcsarnok, Békéscsaba; Attendance: 2,300; Referees: Abrahamsen, Kristiansen (NOR)

June 21, 2009; 16:00 CET	Greece	24:29	Croatia	Dimokritus University, Komotini; Attendance: 600; Referees: I. Kostov, M. Kostov (BUL)
June 21, 2009; 16:00 CET	Tzimourtos 10	(13:14)	three players	Dimokritus University, Komotini; Attendance: 600; Referees: I. Kostov, M. Kostov (BUL)
June 21, 2009; 16:00 CET	3× (yellow card) 5× (suspension)	Report	3× (yellow card) 4× (suspension)	Dimokritus University, Komotini; Attendance: 600; Referees: I. Kostov, M. Kostov (BUL)

June 21, 2009; 16:00 CET	Slovakia	19:30	Hungary	Hlohovec; Attendance: 1,600; Referees: Nielsen, Lorentzen (DEN)
June 21, 2009; 16:00 CET	Pekár, Petro 3	(6:17)	Eklemovics 7	Hlohovec; Attendance: 1,600; Referees: Nielsen, Lorentzen (DEN)
June 21, 2009; 16:00 CET	3× (suspension)	Report	7× (suspension)	Hlohovec; Attendance: 1,600; Referees: Nielsen, Lorentzen (DEN)
