= Cristian Malmagro =

Spanish handball player (born 1983)

Personal information
- Full name: Cristian Malmagro Viaña
- Nationality: Spanish
- Born: 11 March 1983 (age 43) Granollers, Spain
- Height: 1.91 m (6 ft 3 in)

Sport
- Sport: Handball
- Position: Right Back

Senior clubs
- Years: Team
- 2000–2007: BM Granollers
- 2007–2010: Portland San Antonio
- 2010–2012: AG København
- 2012–2013: Montpellier AHB
- 2013–2014: Al Ain Abu Dhabi
- 2014–2015: HCM Minaur Baia Mare
- 07-12/2015: CB Ciudad de Logroño
- 12/2015-2019: (Saudi Arabia) ?
- 03/2019: Handbol Marratxí
National team
Years	Team	Apps	(Gls)
2006-2010	Spain	50	(166)
Medal record
European Handball Championship
Olympic Games
Bronze medal – third place	2008 Beijing	Team
- Updated on December 2010

Cristian Malmagro Viaña (born 11 March 1983 in Granollers) is a Spanish handballer who plays for CB Ciudad de Logroño. He participated at the 2008 Summer Olympics in Beijing as a member of the Spain men's national handball team. The team won a bronze medal, defeating Croatia.

== Achievements ==
- Danish Handball League:
  - Winner: 2011, 2012
- Danish Handball Cup:
  - Winner: 2011
- Coupe de France:
  - Winner: 2013
- Romanian National League:
  - Winner: 2015
- Romanian Cup:
  - Winner: 2015
- Olympic Games:
  - Bronze Medalist: 2008

== Individual awards ==
- Liga ASOBAL Player of the Season: 2008
