= Konstantin Igropulo =

Russian-Greek handball player

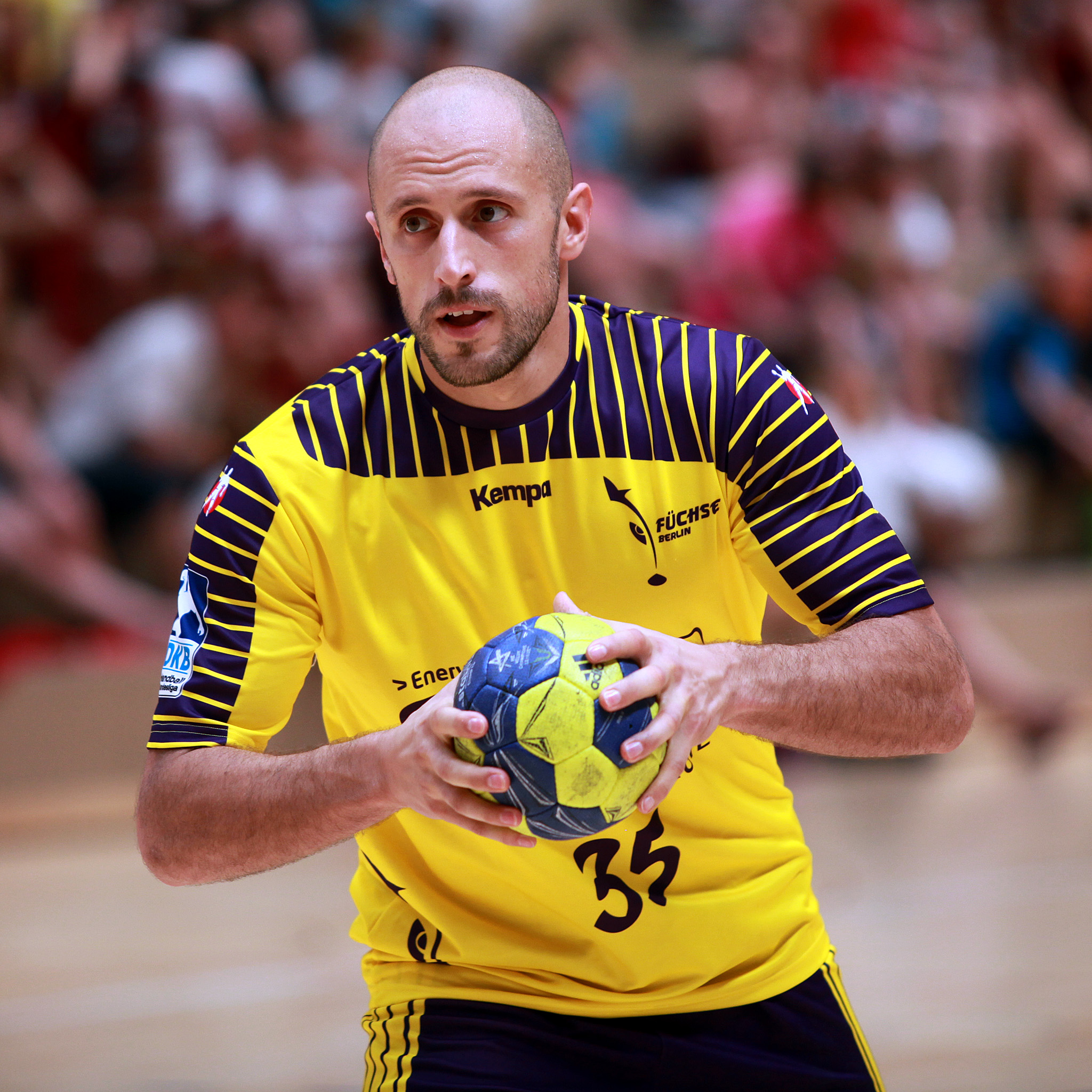

Personal information
- Nationality: Russian/Greek
- Born: 14 April 1985 (age 41) Stavropol, Russia
- Height: 1.90 m (6 ft 3 in)

Sport
- Sport: Handball
- Position: Right back
- Current club: FC Barcelona (assistant coach)

Youth career
- Years: Team
- 1990–2002: Viktor-SKA Stavropol

Senior clubs
- Years: Team
- 2002–2004: Panellinios
- 2004–2005: Viktor-SKA Stavropol
- 2005–2009: Chekhovskiye Medvedi
- 2009–2012: FC Barcelona
- 2012–2015: Füchse Berlin
- 2015–2017: KIF Kolding København
- 2017–2018: HC Meshkov Brest
- 2019–2020: Wisła Płock
National team
Years	Team	Apps	(Gls)
2005–2020	Russia	110	(505)

Teams managed
- 2021–2022: Viktor Stavropol
- 2022–: FC Barcelona (assistant)

Konstantin Igropulo (Russian: Константин Валерьевич Игропуло; born 14 April 1985) is a Russian-Greek former handball player and current assistant coach of FC Barcelona. He played as right back.

He competed at the 2008 Summer Olympics in Beijing, where the Russian team placed sixth.

== Honours ==
- EHF Champions League
  - Winner: 2024
