= Håvard Tvedten =

Norwegian handball player (born 1978)

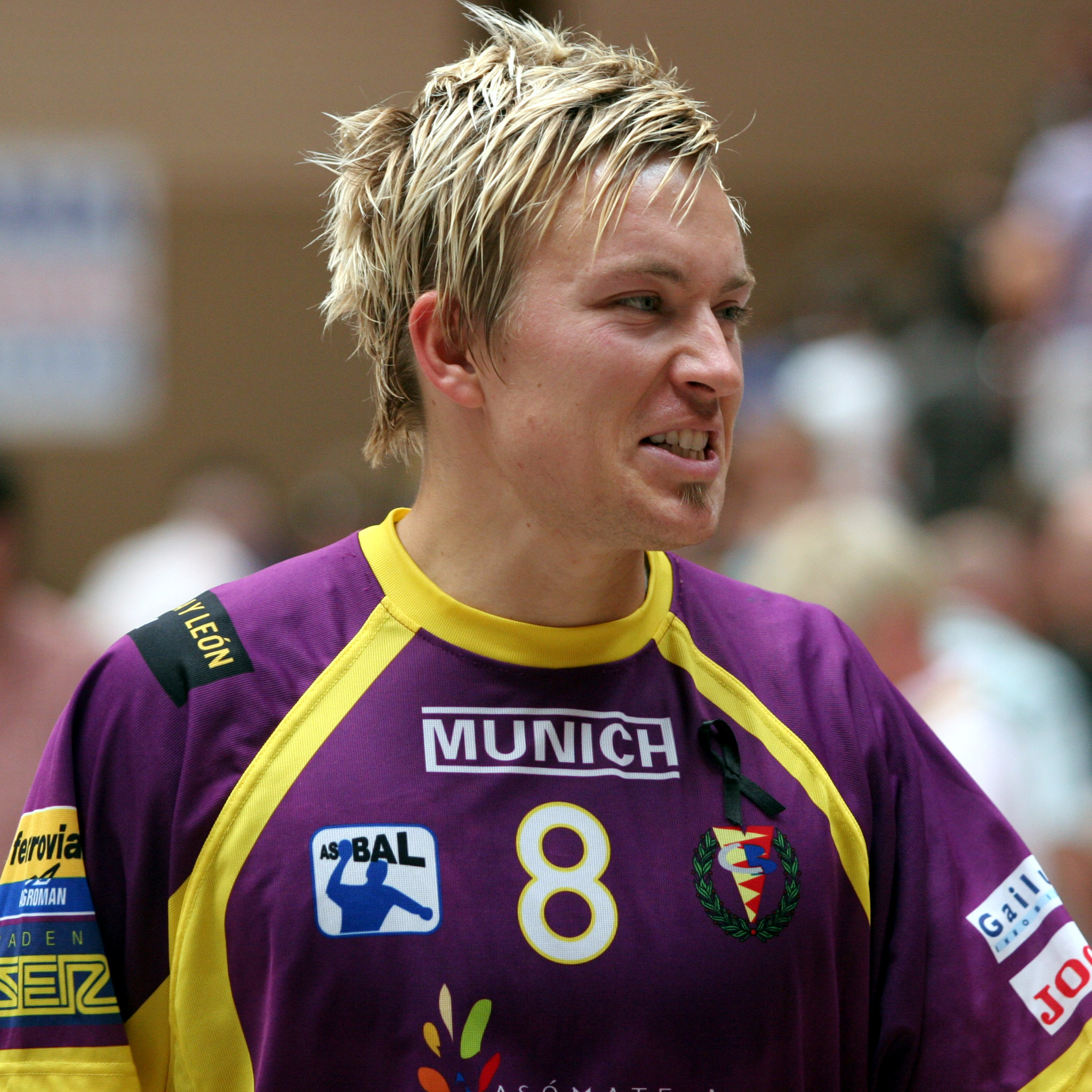

Personal information
- Nationality: Norwegian
- Born: 29 June 1978 (age 48) Stord Municipality, Norway
- Height: 1.83 m (6 ft 0 in)

Sport
- Sport: Handball
- Position: Left wing

Senior clubs
- Years: Team
- –2002: Stord IL
- 2002–2006: AaB Håndbold
- 2006–2008: CB Ciudad de Logroño
- 2008–2011: BM Valladolid
- 2011: Al-Sadd (loan)
- 2011–2016: Aalborg Håndbold
National team
Years	Team	Apps	(Gls)
2000–2014	Norway	208	(809)

Håvard Tvedten (born 29 June 1978) is a Norwegian former handball player. Known for his technical skills and goal-scoring abilities, Tvedten played for clubs in Norway, Denmark and Spain during his career, and was voted best left wing at the 2011 World Championship. He retired from handball in 2016 and has later worked as a pundit.

Tvedten made his debut for the Norwegian national team in 2000 and would later often captain the national team. He made his senior international championship debut at the 2001 World Championship and represented Norway at every international championship from 2005 to 2012. Tvedten retired from the national team in 2014, having made 208 appearances and scored 809 goals over a fourteen-year period.

His shirt number 10 has been retired at Aalborg Håndbold.

== Honours ==
=== Club ===
Aalborg Håndbold

- Danish Championship: 2013

BM Valladolid

- EHF Cup Winners' Cup: 2009

=== Individual ===
- All-Star Left wing of the World Championship: 2011
- Håndballstatuetten: 2019
