= List of Montenegro national handball team players =

Almost 50 different players participated for Montenegro men's national handball team from 2007 until today. Among former players of Montenegro, there are Alen Muratović, Petar Kapisoda, Draško Mrvaljević, Goran Đukanović, Vladimir Osmajić, Goran Stojanović, Blažo Lisičić, Marko Dobrković and others.

Most matches for Montenegrin national team played Igor Marković, Zoran Roganović and Mladen Rakčević. Most goals for Montenegrin national team scored Draško Mrvaljević, Zoran Roganović and Mladen Rakčević.

Majority of players who represented Montenegrin national team were born in Cetinje and during their youth played for the most successful Montenegrin club RK Lovćen.

== Performance in the Montenegro national team ==
Below is the list of all players which participated in the Montenegrin national handball team. Data is only for official matches (qualifiers, European Championship, World Championship). For more information, there is a List of official matches of the Montenegro handball team.

Player	Birthplace	Games	Goals	In team	Championships	EC record	WC record
Božo Anđelić	Cetinje	3	2	2014			
Igor Bakić	Berane	6	1	2008-2011			
Vuko Borilović	Cetinje	2	0	2014-			
Vuko Borozan	Cetinje	7	19	2014-	Euro 2014	3/1	
Miloš Božović	Cetinje	2	4	2014-			
Stefan Čavor	Cetinje	2	1	2014-			
Ivan Čolaković	Nikšić	3	3	2009-2009			
Marko Dapčević	Cetinje	2	3	2011-2011			
Marko Dobrković	Bar	13	34	2007-2008	Euro 2008	6/4	
Golub Doknić	Vrbas	11	0	2008-2010	Euro 2008	3/0	
Marko Drašković	Cetinje	6	9	2010-2011			
Goran Đukanović	Cetinje	14	16	2007-2008	Euro 2008	6/0	
Ratko Đurković	Cetinje	16	15	2007-2008	Euro 2008	6/5	
Nemanja Grbović	Pljevlja	24	29	2011-	WC 2013, Euro 2014	3/1	7/7
Petar Kapisoda	Cetinje	33	72	2007-2013	Euro 2008, WC 2013	7/1	6/21
Miodrag Kažić	Cetinje	8	11	2007-2007			
Milan Kosanović	Niš	6	0	2008-2009			
Goran Lasica	Nikšić	17	5	2012-	WC 2013		7/3
Marko Lasica	Nikšić	24	15	2011-	WC 2013, Euro 2014	3/5	7/2
Vladan Lipovina	Cetinje	6	7	2013-	Euro 2014	1/0	
Blažo Lisičić	Podgorica	9	24	2007-2008			
Mirko Majić	Podgorica	6	4	2011-2012			
Nemanja Malović	Podgorica	1	0	2013-2013			
Igor Marković	Cetinje	49	125	2007-	WC 2013, Euro 2014	3/11	7/22
Žarko Marković	Cetinje	26	85	2007-2012	Euro 2008	6/12	
Marko Martinović	Cetinje	1	0	2008-2008			
Fahrudin Melić	Prijepolje	34	133	2008-	WC 2013		7/29
Rade Mijatović	Sombor	40	1	2007-	Euro 2008, WC 2013, Euro 2014	7/1	7/0
Mile Mijušković	Nikšić	2	0	2014			
Mirko Milašević	Cetinje	38	24	2007-	Euro 2008, WC 2013, Euro 2014	9/7	7/7
Miloš Milošević	Šabac	8	11	2007-2007			
Draško Mrvaljević	Cetinje	40	176	2007-2013	Euro 2008, WC 2013	6/28	1/1
Alen Muratović	Nikšić	16	87	2007-2008	Euro 2008	6/33	
Vladimir Osmajić	Plužine	31	74	2008-2013	WC 2013		7/5
Andrija Pejović	Cetinje	3	4	2011-2011			
Marko Pejović	Cetinje	39	20	2007-2013	Euro 2008, WC 2013	6/3	4/2
Žarko Pejović	Bijelo Polje	21	16	2008-	Euro 2014	3/3	
Ivan Perišić	Cetinje	11	5	2011-	Euro 2014	3/2	
Bogdan Petričević	Cetinje	9	9	2011-	Euro 2014	3/0	
Milan Popović	Cetinje	2	3	2014-			
Mirko Radović	Cetinje	14	4	2010-	Euro 2014	3/2	
Marko Rajković	Bijelo Polje	18	0	2008-2013	WC 2013		3/0
Mladen Rakčević	Cetinje	45	137	2007-	Euro 2008, WC 2013, Euro 2014	6/16	7/15
Zoran Roganović	Cetinje	46	160	2007-	Euro 2008, WC 2013	6/12	7/27
Novica Rudović	Cetinje	14	13	2008-2010	Euro 2008	3/6	
Nebojša Simić	Bar	16	0	2011-	WC 2013, Euro 2014	3/0	4/0
Marko Simović	Cetinje	16	25	2012-	WC 2013, Euro 2014	3/14	7/6
Goran Stojanović	Bar	21	0	2007-2009	Euro 2008	5/0	
Aleksandar Svitlica	Prijepolje	16	26	2008-2010	Euro 2008	6/10	
Dušan Tomić	Priboj	2	2	2014-			
Vasko Ševaljević	Cetinje	26	123	2011-	WC 2013, Euro 2014	3/16	7/36
Miloš Vujović	Cetinje	10	7	2010-	Euro 2014	3/1	
Nikola Vujović	Nikšić	3	1	2007-2007			
Stevan Vujović	Cetinje	29	52	2009-	Euro 2008, WC 2013	2/0	7/17

== Coaching history ==
Coach	From	To	Record*					Championship
Coach	From	To	M	W	D	L	Win %	Championship
(Montenegro) Pero Milošević	October 2006	June 2007	8	7	1	0	87.50	None
(Montenegro) Ranko Popović	August 2007	November 2009	16	5	1	10	31.25	Euro 2008
(Bosnia and Herzegovina) Kasim Kamenica	November 2009	April 2010	2	1	0	1	50.00	None
(Montenegro) Miodrag Popović	April 2010	March 2011	4	1	0	3	25.00	None
(Montenegro) Zoran Kastratović	May 2011	February 2014	24	10	0	14	41.67	WC 2013, Euro 2014
(Serbia) Ljubomir Obradović	March 2014		4	2	0	2	50.00	

* Data is only for official matches (qualifiers, European Championship, World Championship). For more information, there is a List of official matches of the Montenegro handball team

== See also ==
- Montenegro men's national handball team
- List of official matches of the Montenegro handball team
- Handball Federation of Montenegro
- Montenegro women's national handball team
