= National team appearances in the European Men's Handball Championship =

This article lists the performances of each of the 27 national teams which have made at least one appearance in the European Men's Handball Championship finals.

== Debut of teams ==
Each successive European Men's Handball Championship has had at least one team appearing for the first time. Teams in parentheses are considered successor teams by IHF.

Year	Debutants Qualification	Number of Debutants	Debutants Championship	Number of Debutants
1994; Qual.	Austria; Belarus; Belgium; Bulgaria; Croatia; Cyprus; Czech Republic; Denmark; Estonia; Finland; France; Georgia; Germany; Greece; Hungary; Iceland; Israel; Italy; Latvia; Lithuania; Luxembourg; Moldova; Netherlands; Norway; Poland; Romania; Russia; Slovakia; Slovenia; Spain; Sweden; Switzerland; Turkey; Ukraine	34	Belarus; Croatia; Denmark; France; Germany; Hungary; Portugal; Romania; Russia; Slovenia; Spain; Sweden	12
1996; Qual.	Azerbaijan; Bosnia and Herzegovina; Macedonia; Portugal; FR Yugoslavia	5	Czech Republic; FR Yugoslavia	2
1998; Qual.			Italy; Lithuania; Macedonia	3
2000; Qual.			Iceland; Norway; Ukraine	3
2002; Qual.	Faroe Islands	1	Israel; Poland; Switzerland	3
2004; Qual.				0
2006; Qual.			Slovakia	1
2008; Qual.	Montenegro (Serbia)	1 (+1)	Montenegro	1
2010; Qual.			Austria (Serbia)	1 (+1)
2012; Qual.	Great Britain	1		0
2014; Qual.	Ireland; Malta	2		0
2016; Qual.				0
2018; Qual.	Kosovo	1		0
2020; Qual.			Bosnia and Herzegovina; Latvia; Netherlands	3
2022; Qual.				0
2024; Qual.			Faroe Islands; Georgia; Greece	3
2026; Qual.				0
2028; Qual.				TBD

== Participating nations ==
Legend

- 1st – Champions
- 2nd – Runners-up
- 3rd – Third place
- 4th – Fourth place
- 5th – Fifth place
- 6th – Sixth place
- 7th – Seventh place
- 8th – Eighth place
- 9th – Ninth place
- 10th – Tenth place
- 11th – Eleventh place
- 12th – Twelfth place
- MR – Main round
- GS – Group stage
- Q – Qualified for upcoming tournament
- q – may still qualify for upcoming tournament
- • – Did not qualify
- •× – Disqualified
- × – Did not enter / Withdrew / Banned
- – Hosts

Team	(Portugal) 1994	(Spain) 1996	(Italy) 1998	(Croatia) 2000	(Sweden) 2002	(Slovenia) 2004	(Switzerland) 2006	(Norway) 2008	(Austria) 2010	(Serbia) 2012	(Denmark) 2014	(Poland) 2016	(Croatia) 2018	(Austria) (Norway) (Sweden) 2020	(Hungary) (Slovakia) 2022	(Germany) 2024	(Denmark) (Norway) (Sweden) 2026	(Portugal) (Spain) (Switzerland) 2028	(Czech Republic) (Denmark) (Poland) 2030	(France) (Germany) 2032	Participations
Austria	•	•	•	•	•	•	•	•	9th	•	11th	•	15th	8th	20th	8th	16th				7
Belarus	8th	•	•	•	•	•	•	15th	•	•	12th	10th	10th	10th	17th	×	×				7
Bosnia and Herzegovina	•	•	•	•	•	•	•	•	•	•	•	•	•	23rd	23rd	24th	•				3
Croatia	3rd	5th	8th	6th	16th	4th	4th	2nd	2nd	3rd	4th	3rd	5th	2nd	8th	11th	3rd				17
Czech Republic	•	6th	10th	•	8th	11th	•	13th	8th	14th	15th	•	6th	12th	13th	15th	17th		Q		13
Denmark	4th	12th	•	10th	3rd	3rd	3rd	1st	5th	1st	2nd	6th	4th	13th	3rd	2nd	1st	Q	Q		17
Faroe Islands	•	•	•	•	•	•	•	×	•	×	×	×	×	•	•	20th	13th				2
France	6th	7th	7th	4th	6th	6th	1st	3rd	1st	11th	1st	5th	3rd	14th	4th	1st	7th			Q	17
Georgia	•	•	•	•	•	•	•	•	×	•	×	×	•	•	•	18th	20th				2
Germany	9th	8th	3rd	9th	2nd	1st	5th	4th	10th	7th	•	1st	9th	5th	7th	4th	2nd			Q	16
Greece	•	•	•	•	•	•	•	•	•	•	•	•	•	•	•	23rd	•				1
Hungary	7th	10th	6th	•	•	9th	13th	8th	14th	8th	8th	12th	14th	9th	15th	5th	10th				15
Iceland	•	•	•	11th	4th	13th	7th	11th	3rd	10th	5th	13th	13th	11th	6th	10th	4th				14
Israel	•	•	•	•	14th	•	•	•	•	•	•	•	•	•	•	•	•				1
Italy	•	•	11th	•	•	•	•	•	•	•	•	•	•	•	•	•	18th				2
Latvia	•	•	•	•	•	•	•	•	•	•	•	•	•	24th	•	•	•				1
Lithuania	•	•	9th	•	•	•	•	•	•	•	•	•	•	•	21st	•	•				2
Montenegro^{1}								12th	•	•	16th	16th	16th	18th	11th	14th	23rd				8
Netherlands	•	•	•	•	•	•	•	•	•	•	•	•	•	17th	10th	12th	15th				4
North Macedonia	×	•	12th	•	•	•	•	•	•	5th	10th	11th	11th	15th	22nd	17th	14th				9
Norway	•	•	•	8th	•	•	11th	6th	7th	13th	14th	4th	7th	3rd	5th	9th	9th				12
Poland	•	•	•	•	15th	16th	10th	7th	4th	9th	6th	7th	•	21st	12th	16th	21st		Q		12
Portugal	12th	•	•	7th	9th	14th	15th	•	•	•	•	•	•	6th	19th	7th	5th	Q			10
Romania	11th	9th	•	•	•	•	•	•	•	•	•	•	•	•	•	22nd	22nd				4
Russia	2nd	1st	4th	2nd	5th	5th	6th	14th	12th	15th	9th	9th	•	22nd	9th	×	×				14
Serbia^{1}								•	13th	2nd	13th	15th	12th	20th	14th	19th	19th				9
Slovakia	•	•	•	•	•	•	16th	16th	•	16th	•	•	•	•	18th	•	•				4
Slovenia	10th	11th	•	5th	12th	2nd	8th	10th	11th	6th	•	14th	8th	4th	16th	6th	8th				15
Spain	5th	2nd	2nd	3rd	7th	10th	2nd	9th	6th	4th	3rd	2nd	1st	1st	2nd	13th	11th	Q			18
Sweden	1st	4th	1st	1st	1st	7th	•	5th	15th	12th	7th	8th	2nd	7th	1st	3rd	6th				16
Switzerland	•	•	•	•	13th	12th	14th	•	•	•	•	•	•	16th	•	21st	12th	Q			7
Ukraine	•	•	•	12th	11th	15th	12th	•	16th	•	•	•	•	19th	24th	•	24th				8
Historical national teams
Serbia and Montenegro^{1}						8th	9th														2
Yugoslavia^{1}	×	3rd	5th		10th																3
Total	12	12	12	12	16	16	16	16	16	16	16	16	16	24	24	24	24	24	24	24	

^{1} FR Yugoslavia competed as such until 2003 when the FRY was reconstituted as a State Union Serbia and Montenegro. Since the dissolution of the union in 2006, national teams exist for both countries.

== Results of host nations ==
Year	Host nation	Finish
1994	Portugal	12th place
1996	Spain	Runners-up
1998	Italy	11th place
2000	Croatia	6th place
2002	Sweden	Champions
2004	Slovenia	Runners-up
2006	Switzerland	14th place
2008	Norway	6th place
2010	Austria	9th place
2012	Serbia	Runners-up
2014	Denmark	Runners-up
2016	Poland	7th place
2018	Croatia	5th place
2020	Austria	8th place
2020	Norway	Third place
2020	Sweden	7th place
2022	Hungary	15th place
2022	Slovakia	18th place
2024	Germany	Fourth place
2026	Denmark	Champions
2026	Norway	9th place
2026	Sweden	6th place
2028	Portugal	
2028	Spain	
2028	Switzerland	
2030	Czech Republic	
2030	Denmark	
2030	Poland	
2032	France	
2032	Germany	

== Results of defending champions ==
Year	Defending champions	Finish
1996	Sweden	Fourth place
1998	Russia	Fourth place
2000	Sweden	Champions
2002	Sweden	Champions
2004	Sweden	7th place
2006	Germany	5th place
2008	France	Third place
2010	Denmark	5th place
2012	France	11th place
2014	Denmark	Runners-up
2016	France	5th place
2018	Germany	9th place
2020	Spain	Champions
2022	Spain	Runners-up
2024	Sweden	Third place
2026	France	7th place
2028	Denmark	
