= List of official matches of the Montenegro handball team =

The Montenegro men's national handball team represents Montenegro in international handball competitions. The national team was formed in 2006 recently after the Montenegrin independence.

National handball team of Montenegro made their historical debut matches in the January 2007. Except the qualifying matches, Montenegro played on the two greatest global tournaments - World Championship and the European Championship

== Records ==
Largest victory
41:27, Montenegro – Finland, 6 January 2007, Budva

Largest defeat
43:26, Switzerland – Montenegro, 20 January 2026, Bærum

Largest away victory
31:37, Turkey – Montenegro, 29 November 2008, Rize

Largest home defeat
28:39, Montenegro – Sweden, 8 June 2011, Pljevlja

Longest unbeaten streak
9 matches, (3 January 2007 - 18 January 2008)

Longest losing streak
7 matches, (14 June 2015 - 6 November 2016)

Most scored goals in a match
41, Montenegro – Finland 41:27

Most goals against in a match
39, Montenegro – Sweden 28:39, Montenegro – Poland

Highest home attendance
approx. 6,000, Montenegro – Greece 33:25, 17 April 2022, Podgorica

Highest away attendance
11,835, Denmark – Montenegro 37:26, 13 April 2019, Copenhagen

Lowest home attendance
800, Montenegro – Faroe Islands 24:24, 24 October 2018, Podgorica (note: excluding matches during COVID-19 pandemic)

Lowest away attendance
300, Greece – Montenegro 29:26, 16 January 2010, Alcamo (note: excluding matches during COVID-19 pandemic)

== Results ==
Below is the list of all official matches of Montenegro national handball team.

Date	Event	Match			Score	Venue	Attendance
03.01.2007	ECQ	Finland	-	Montenegro	26:28	Vantaa	1,300
06.01.2007	ECQ	Montenegro	-	Finland	41:27	Budva	1,500
10.01.2007	ECQ	Montenegro	-	Austria	31:24	Cetinje	2,000
13.01.2007	ECQ	Austria	-	Montenegro	34:35	Stockerau	1,500
17.01.2007	ECQ	Montenegro	-	Netherlands	32:27	Bijelo Polje	3,000
21.01.2007	ECQ	Netherlands	-	Montenegro	33:33	Panningen	2,000
10.06.2007	ECQ	Portugal	-	Montenegro	28:30	Lagos	1,000
17.06.2007	ECQ	Montenegro	-	Portugal	33:27	Bijelo Polje	3,500
17.01.2008	EC 2008	Montenegro	-	Russia	25:25	Drammen	4,000
18.01.2008	EC 2008	Montenegro	-	Denmark	24:32	Drammen	2,500
19.01.2008	EC 2008	Montenegro	-	Norway	22:27	Drammen	4,000
22.01.2008	EC 2008	Montenegro	-	Slovenia	29:31	Stavanger	3,000
23.01.2008	EC 2008	Montenegro	-	Croatia	26:34	Stavanger	2,800
24.01.2008	EC 2008	Montenegro	-	Poland	23:39	Stavanger	2,500
08.06.2008	WCQ	Montenegro	-	Romania	31:27	Bijelo Polje	3,000
14.06.2008	WCQ	Romania	-	Montenegro	29:24	Oradea	2,000
21.10.2008	ECQ	Poland	-	Montenegro	30:20	Bydgoszcz	4,500
26.11.2008	ECQ	Montenegro	-	Romania	35:33	Nikšić	3,000
29.11.2008	ECQ	Turkey	-	Montenegro	31:37	Rize	1,000
18.03.2009	ECQ	Montenegro	-	Sweden	29:33	Nikšić	3,500
22.03.2009	ECQ	Sweden	-	Montenegro	29:24	Norrköping	4,000
10.06.2009	ECQ	Montenegro	-	Turkey	33:26	Nikšić	2,500
13.06.2009	ECQ	Romania	-	Montenegro	27:28	Bucharest	2,000
17.06.2009	ECQ	Montenegro	-	Poland	23:31	Nikšić	3,500
16.01.2010	WCQ	Greece	-	Montenegro	29:26	Alcamo	300
17.01.2010	WCQ	Italy	-	Montenegro	26:28	Alcamo	1,200
28.10.2010	ECQ	Sweden	-	Montenegro	30:27	Kristianstad	5,000
31.10.2010	ECQ	Montenegro	-	Slovakia	25:35	Bar	3,000
09.03.2011	ECQ	Israel	-	Montenegro	29:24	Rishon LeZion	800
13.03.2011	ECQ	Montenegro	-	Israel	36:27	Nikšić	3,000
08.06.2011	ECQ	Montenegro	-	Sweden	28:39	Pljevlja	2,000
12.06.2011	ECQ	Slovakia	-	Montenegro	36:21	Košice	8,100
04.01.2012	WCQ	Montenegro	-	Belgium	35:27	Cetinje	1,000
07.01.2012	WCQ	Belgium	-	Montenegro	33:37	Tournai	800
11.01.2012	WCQ	Latvia	-	Montenegro	30:31	Dobele	1,000
13.01.2012	WCQ	Montenegro	-	Latvia	32:28	Cetinje	1,500
10.06.2012	WCQ	Sweden	-	Montenegro	22:21	Stockholm	5,000
17.06.2012	WCQ	Montenegro	-	Sweden	20:18	Podgorica	4,000
01.10.2012	ECQ	Germany	-	Montenegro	27:31	Mannheim	7,300
04.11.2012	ECQ	Montenegro	-	Czech Republic	23:22	Bar	3,000
12.01.2013	WC 2013	Montenegro	-	Argentina	26:28	Granollers	3,000
13.01.2013	WC 2013	Montenegro	-	France	20:32	Granollers	5,200
15.01.2013	WC 2013	Montenegro	-	Tunisia	25:27	Granollers	2,500
16.01.2013	WC 2013	Montenegro	-	Germany	21:29	Granollers	3,600
18.01.2013	WC 2013	Montenegro	-	Brazil	25:26	Barcelona	2,000
21.01.2013	WC 2013	Montenegro	-	Chile	35:31	Guadalajara	500
22.01.2013	WC 2013	Montenegro	-	South Korea	27:30	Guadalajara	500
03.04.2013	ECQ	Montenegro	-	Israel	29:28	Podgorica	2,500
06.04.2013	ECQ	Israel	-	Montenegro	28:25	Rishon LeZion	1,000
12.06.2013	ECQ	Montenegro	-	Germany	27:25	Podgorica	3,000
15.06.2013	ECQ	Czech Republic	-	Montenegro	30:25	Brno	2,500
13.01.2014	EC 2014	Montenegro	-	Sweden	21:28	Brøndby	2,400
15.01.2014	EC 2014	Montenegro	-	Croatia	22:27	Brøndby	2,700
17.01.2014	EC 2014	Montenegro	-	Belarus	23:29	Brøndby	3,500
08.06.2014	WCQ	Montenegro	-	Belarus	28:27	Podgorica	2,000
15.06.2014	WCQ	Belarus	-	Montenegro	30:24	Minsk	7,500
29.10.2014	ECQ	Serbia	-	Montenegro	25:21	Belgrade	7,000
2.11.2014	ECQ	Montenegro	-	Iceland	25:24	Bar	2,300
30.4.2015	ECQ	Israel	-	Montenegro	19:22	Tel Aviv	1,500
3.5.2015	ECQ	Montenegro	-	Israel	33:27	Bar	2,500
10.6.2015	ECQ	Montenegro	-	Serbia	23:23	Bar	2,500
14.6.2015	ECQ	Iceland	-	Montenegro	32:23	Reykjavík	2,050
16.1.2016	EC 2016	Hungary	-	Montenegro	32:27	Sopot	6,864
18.1.2016	EC 2016	Montenegro	-	Denmark	28:30	Sopot	6,980
20.1.2016	EC 2016	Russia	-	Montenegro	28:21	Sopot	5,930
12.6.2016	WCQ	Russia	-	Montenegro	29:22	Moscow	1,800
15.6.2016	WCQ	Montenegro	-	Russia	19:29	Bar	2,500
3.11.2016	ECQ	Sweden	-	Montenegro	36:21	Lund	3,016
6.11.2016	ECQ	Montenegro	-	Russia	24:24	Bar	2,150
3.5.2017	ECQ	Slovakia	-	Montenegro	27:27	Hlohovec	2,000
6.5.2017	ECQ	Montenegro	-	Slovakia	31:30	Bijelo Polje	2,300
14.6.2017	ECQ	Montenegro	-	Sweden	28:24	Nikšić	3,600
17.6.2017	ECQ	Russia	-	Montenegro	27:27	Moscow	2,000
13.1.2018	EC 2018	Montenegro	-	Germany	19:32	Zagreb	8,000
15.1.2018	EC 2018	Montenegro	-	North Macedonia	28:29	Zagreb	5,000
17.1.2018	EC 2018	Montenegro	-	Slovenia	19:28	Zagreb	6,200
09.06.2018	WCQ	Croatia	-	Montenegro	32:19	Osijek	4,500
14.06.2018	WCQ	Montenegro	-	Croatia	32:31	Podgorica	1,100
24.10.2018	ECQ	Montenegro	-	Faroe Islands	24:24	Podgorica	800
28.10.2018	ECQ	Ukraine	-	Montenegro	29:24	Sumy	1,500
10.04.2019	ECQ	Montenegro	-	Denmark	32:31	Podgorica	4,365
13.04.2019	ECQ	Denmark	-	Montenegro	37:26	Copenhagen	11,835
13.06.2019	ECQ	Faroe Islands	-	Montenegro	21:24	Farum	950
16.06.2019	ECQ	Montenegro	-	Ukraine	27:21	Podgorica	4,000
9.1.2020	EC 2020	Montenegro	-	Croatia	21:27	Graz	5,600
11.1.2020	EC 2020	Montenegro	-	Serbia	22:21	Graz	5,500
13.1.2020	EC 2020	Montenegro	-	Belarus	27:36	Graz	5,000

== Montenegro vs. other countries ==
During its history, Montenegrin national handball team played against 31 various countries.

Most matches, Montenegro played against Sweden (9), Israel (6) and Russia (6).

Opponent	G	W	D	L	GF	GA	GD
Austria	2	2	0	0	66	58	+8
Argentina	1	0	0	1	26	28	-2
Belarus	4	1	0	3	102	122	-20
Belgium	2	2	0	0	72	60	+12
Brazil	1	0	0	1	25	26	-1
Croatia	5	1	0	4	118	153	-35
Czech Republic	2	1	0	1	48	52	-4
Chile	1	1	0	0	35	31	+4
Denmark	4	1	0	3	110	130	-20
Faroe Islands	2	1	1	0	48	45	+3
Finland	2	2	0	0	69	53	+16
France	1	0	0	1	20	32	-12
Germany	4	2	0	2	98	113	-15
Greece	1	0	0	1	26	29	-3
Hungary	1	0	0	1	27	32	-5
Iceland	2	1	0	1	48	56	-8
Italy	1	1	0	0	28	26	+2
Israel	6	4	0	2	169	158	+11
South Korea	1	0	0	1	27	30	-3
Latvia	2	2	0	0	63	58	+5
North Macedonia	1	0	0	1	28	29	-1
Netherlands	2	1	1	0	65	60	+5
Norway	1	0	0	1	22	27	-5
Poland	3	0	0	3	66	100	-34
Portugal	2	2	0	0	63	55	+8
Romania	4	3	0	1	118	116	+2
Russia	6	0	3	3	138	162	-24
Serbia	3	1	1	1	66	69	-3
Slovakia	4	1	1	2	104	128	-24
Slovenia	2	0	0	2	48	59	-11
Sweden	9	2	0	7	219	259	-40
Tunisia	1	0	0	1	25	27	-2
Turkey	2	2	0	0	70	57	+13
Ukraine	2	1	0	1	51	50	+1
34 Countries	87	35	7	45	2308	2491	-183

Updated till 29 February 2020

== Tournaments ==
During the past, Montenegro participated on the next official (EHF/IHF) tournaments:
2007 - Qualifiers for Euro 2008
2008 - European Championship 2008
2008 - Qualifiers for World Championship 2009
2008/09 - Qualifiers for Euro 2010
2010 - Qualifiers for World Championship 2011
2010/11 - Qualifiers for Euro 2012
2012 - Qualifiers for World Championship 2013
2012/13 - Qualifiers for Euro 2014
2013 - World Championship 2013
2014 - European Championship 2014
2014 - Qualifiers for World Championship 2015
2014/15 - Qualifiers for Euro 2016
2016 - European Championship 2016
2016 - Qualifiers for World Championship 2017
2016/17 - Qualifiers for Euro 2018
2018 - European Championship 2018
2018 - Qualifiers for World Championship 2019
2018/19 - Qualifiers for Euro 2020
2020 - European Championship 2020

Tournament	Matches	Wins	Draws	Loss	GF	GA
World Championship	7	1	0	6	179	204
European Championship	18	1	1	16	427	525
Qualifying matches EC/WC	62	33	6	23	1702	1752
OVERALL	87	35	7	45	2308	2491

Updated: Feb 29, 2020

== See also ==
- Montenegro men's national handball team
- Handball Federation of Montenegro
- Montenegro women's national handball team
