= 2011 World Men's Handball Championship – European qualification =

This page describes the European zone qualifying procedure for the 2011 World Men's Handball Championship.

== Qualification system ==
=== Seeding ===
The draw for the qualification round was held on 6 August 2009 at the EHF headquarters, in Vienna. Sweden (host nation), and France (defending champion), are directly qualified. The top 3 participants at the 2010 European Men's Handball Championship, excluding Sweden and France will also qualify for the final tournament, while the other 11 participants are guaranteed a place in the play-off Round. The remaining 23 teams were divided into several pots according to their positions in the 2010 European Men's Handball Championship qualification, and were successfully drawn so that each qualification group contained one team from pots 1 to 3. Groups 1 and 2 will also comprise one team from pot 4.

Pot 1	Pot 2	Pot 3	Pot 4
Belarus; Bosnia and Herzegovina; Macedonia; Montenegro; Netherlands; Portugal; Slovakia	Estonia; Greece; Israel; Latvia; Lithuania; Romania; Switzerland	Belgium; Bulgaria; Cyprus; Finland; Italy; Luxembourg; Turkey	Faroe Islands; Great Britain

=== Playing dates ===
- Qualification Round: 15, 16 and 17 January 2010
- Play-off Round: 12/13 and 19/20 June 2010

=== Tiebreakers ===
If two or more teams are equal on points on completion of the group matches, the following criteria are applied to determine the rankings.

1. Higher number of points obtained in the group matches played among the teams in question.
2. Superior goal difference from the group matches played among the teams in question.
3. Higher number of goals scored in the group matches played among the teams in question.
4. If, after applying criteria 1) to 3) to several teams, two or more teams still have an equal ranking, the criteria 1) to 3) will be reapplied to determine the ranking of these teams. If this procedure does not lead to a decision, criteria 5), 6) and 7) will apply.
5. Superior goal difference from all group matches played.
6. Higher number of goals scored in all group matches played.
7. Drawing of lots.

== Qualification round ==
Each group will take place on the court of the third seeded team. In case the third seeded team can't organize the qualification tournament, the first seed will take its place. The winner of each group qualifies for the play-off matches, which will be played on 12/13 June and 19/20 June 2010.

=== Group 1 ===
Pos	Team	Pld	W	D	L	GF	GA	GD	Pts	Qualification
1	Switzerland	3	3	0	0	106	56	+50	6	Playoffs
2	Cyprus (H)	3	2	0	1	81	93	−12	4	
3	Belarus	3	1	0	2	92	89	+3	2	
4	Faroe Islands	3	0	0	3	76	117	−41	0	

(H) Hosts

January 15, 2010; 17:00	Switzerland	44–17	Faroe Islands	Cyprus College Athletic Centre, Nicosia; Attendance: 100; Referees: Gubica, Milosevic (CRO)
January 15, 2010; 17:00	Schmid 8	(21–7)	Dal-Christiansen 6	Cyprus College Athletic Centre, Nicosia; Attendance: 100; Referees: Gubica, Milosevic (CRO)
January 15, 2010; 17:00	3× (yellow card) 1× (suspension)	(Report)	2× (yellow card) 6× (suspension) 1× (red card)	Cyprus College Athletic Centre, Nicosia; Attendance: 100; Referees: Gubica, Milosevic (CRO)

January 15, 2010; 19:30	Belarus	30–31	Cyprus	Cyprus College Athletic Centre, Nicosia; Attendance: 600; Referees: Horváth, Marton (HUN)
January 15, 2010; 19:30	Gromyko 9	(14–16)	Papakyprianou 8	Cyprus College Athletic Centre, Nicosia; Attendance: 600; Referees: Horváth, Marton (HUN)
January 15, 2010; 19:30	3× (yellow card) 4× (suspension)	(Report)	3× (yellow card) 6× (suspension)	Cyprus College Athletic Centre, Nicosia; Attendance: 600; Referees: Horváth, Marton (HUN)

January 16, 2010; 15:00	Faroe Islands	32–39	Belarus	Cyprus College Athletic Centre, Nicosia; Attendance: 100
January 16, 2010; 15:00	Hanusarson 10	(15–22)	Kamyshyk, Pukhouski 9	Cyprus College Athletic Centre, Nicosia; Attendance: 100
January 16, 2010; 15:00	3× (yellow card) 3× (suspension)	(Report)	3× (yellow card) 2× (suspension)	Cyprus College Athletic Centre, Nicosia; Attendance: 100

January 16, 2010; 17:30	Switzerland	36–16	Cyprus	Cyprus College Athletic Centre, Nicosia; Attendance: 800
January 16, 2010; 17:30	Schmid 9	(17–8)	Markides 7	Cyprus College Athletic Centre, Nicosia; Attendance: 800
January 16, 2010; 17:30	3× (yellow card) 4× (suspension)	(Report)	3× (yellow card) 4× (suspension)	Cyprus College Athletic Centre, Nicosia; Attendance: 800

January 17, 2010; 11:30	Belarus	23–26	Switzerland	Cyprus College Athletic Centre, Nicosia; Attendance: 200
January 17, 2010; 11:30	Gromyko, Usik 5	(13–9)	Kurth 10	Cyprus College Athletic Centre, Nicosia; Attendance: 200
January 17, 2010; 11:30	3× (yellow card) 7× (suspension) 1× (red card)	(Report)	3× (yellow card) 5× (suspension)	Cyprus College Athletic Centre, Nicosia; Attendance: 200

January 17, 2010; 14:00	Cyprus	34–27	Faroe Islands	Cyprus College Athletic Centre, Nicosia; Attendance: 500
January 17, 2010; 14:00	Efstathiadis 9	(14–15)	Hanusarson 9	Cyprus College Athletic Centre, Nicosia; Attendance: 500
January 17, 2010; 14:00	3× (yellow card) 5× (suspension)	(Report)	3× (yellow card) 5× (suspension)	Cyprus College Athletic Centre, Nicosia; Attendance: 500

=== Group 2 ===
Pos	Team	Pld	W	D	L	GF	GA	GD	Pts	Qualification
1	Romania	3	3	0	0	97	76	+21	6	Playoffs
2	Bosnia and Herzegovina	3	2	0	1	100	76	+24	4	
3	Finland (H)	3	1	0	2	86	83	+3	2	
4	Great Britain	3	0	0	3	67	115	−48	0	

(H) Hosts

January 15, 2010; 17:30	Romania	36–27	Great Britain	Energia Areena, Vantaa; Attendance: 200; Referees: Martin Franco, Monroy Rodriguez (ESP)
January 15, 2010; 17:30	Stamate A. 6	(23–11)	Prieto 6	Energia Areena, Vantaa; Attendance: 200; Referees: Martin Franco, Monroy Rodriguez (ESP)
January 15, 2010; 17:30	3× (yellow card) 3× (suspension)	(Report)	3× (yellow card) 4× (suspension)	Energia Areena, Vantaa; Attendance: 200; Referees: Martin Franco, Monroy Rodriguez (ESP)

January 15, 2010; 20:00	Bosnia and Herzegovina	30–28	Finland	Energia Areena, Vantaa; Attendance: 700; Referees: Zotin, Volodkov (RUS)
January 15, 2010; 20:00	Terzić 7	(17–13)	Karlsson 8	Energia Areena, Vantaa; Attendance: 700; Referees: Zotin, Volodkov (RUS)
January 15, 2010; 20:00	3× (yellow card) 4× (suspension)	(Report)	3× (yellow card) 2× (suspension)	Energia Areena, Vantaa; Attendance: 700; Referees: Zotin, Volodkov (RUS)

January 16, 2010; 17:30	Great Britain	19–44	Bosnia and Herzegovina	Energia Areena, Vantaa; Attendance: 400; Referees: Zotin, Volodkov (RUS)
January 16, 2010; 17:30	Larsson 6	(12–17)	Toromanović 9	Energia Areena, Vantaa; Attendance: 400; Referees: Zotin, Volodkov (RUS)
January 16, 2010; 17:30	3× (yellow card) 2× (suspension)	(Report)	3× (yellow card) 1× (suspension)	Energia Areena, Vantaa; Attendance: 400; Referees: Zotin, Volodkov (RUS)

January 16, 2010; 20:00	Romania	32–23	Finland	Energia Areena, Vantaa; Attendance: 1000; Referees: Martin Franco, Monroy Rodriguez (ESP)
January 16, 2010; 20:00	Csepreghi 6	(15–11)	Grönberg, Kangas, Rönnberg, Skogberg 4	Energia Areena, Vantaa; Attendance: 1000; Referees: Martin Franco, Monroy Rodriguez (ESP)
January 16, 2010; 20:00	3× (yellow card) 6× (suspension)	(Report)	2× (yellow card) 4× (suspension)	Energia Areena, Vantaa; Attendance: 1000; Referees: Martin Franco, Monroy Rodriguez (ESP)

January 17, 2010; 14:30	Finland	35–21	Great Britain	Energia Areena, Vantaa; Attendance: 700; Referees: Zotin, Volodkov (RUS)
January 17, 2010; 14:30	Skogberg 11	(17–13)	Larsson 12	Energia Areena, Vantaa; Attendance: 700; Referees: Zotin, Volodkov (RUS)
January 17, 2010; 14:30	3× (yellow card) 2× (suspension)	(Report)	3× (yellow card) 6× (suspension)	Energia Areena, Vantaa; Attendance: 700; Referees: Zotin, Volodkov (RUS)

January 17, 2010; 17:00	Bosnia and Herzegovina	26–29	Romania	Energia Areena, Vantaa; Attendance: 450; Referees: Martin Franco, Monroy Rodriguez (ESP)
January 17, 2010; 17:00	Prce 6	(13–15)	Sabou 5	Energia Areena, Vantaa; Attendance: 450; Referees: Martin Franco, Monroy Rodriguez (ESP)
January 17, 2010; 17:00	2× (yellow card) 7× (suspension)	(Report)	3× (yellow card) 3× (suspension)	Energia Areena, Vantaa; Attendance: 450; Referees: Martin Franco, Monroy Rodriguez (ESP)

=== Group 3 ===
Pos	Team	Pld	W	D	L	GF	GA	GD	Pts	Qualification
1	Slovakia (H)	2	2	0	0	77	44	+33	4	Playoffs
2	Israel	2	1	0	1	62	50	+12	2	
3	Bulgaria	2	0	0	2	44	89	−45	0	

(H) Hosts

January 15, 2010; 17:00	Slovakia	49–22	Bulgaria	Športová Hala, Hlohovec; Attendance: 1000; Referees: Nikolov, Nachevski (MKD)
January 15, 2010; 17:00	Antl 8	(24–8)	Ruskov 5	Športová Hala, Hlohovec; Attendance: 1000; Referees: Nikolov, Nachevski (MKD)
January 15, 2010; 17:00	3× (yellow card) 3× (suspension)	(Report)	3× (yellow card) 3× (suspension)	Športová Hala, Hlohovec; Attendance: 1000; Referees: Nikolov, Nachevski (MKD)

January 16, 2010; 17:00	Israel	40–22	Bulgaria	Športová Hala, Hlohovec; Attendance: 200; Referees: Nikolov, Nachevski (MKD)
January 16, 2010; 17:00	Pomeranz 8	(22–6)	Borisov 5	Športová Hala, Hlohovec; Attendance: 200; Referees: Nikolov, Nachevski (MKD)
January 16, 2010; 17:00	3× (yellow card) 3× (suspension)	(Report)	3× (yellow card) 4× (suspension) 1× (red card)	Športová Hala, Hlohovec; Attendance: 200; Referees: Nikolov, Nachevski (MKD)

January 17, 2010; 11:00	Slovakia	28–22	Israel	Športová Hala, Hlohovec; Attendance: 1500; Referees: Nikolov, Nachevski (MKD)
January 17, 2010; 11:00	Antl, Valo 7	(17–10)	Smoler 6	Športová Hala, Hlohovec; Attendance: 1500; Referees: Nikolov, Nachevski (MKD)
January 17, 2010; 11:00	3× (yellow card) 7× (suspension) 1× (red card)	(Report)	3× (yellow card) 5× (suspension)	Športová Hala, Hlohovec; Attendance: 1500; Referees: Nikolov, Nachevski (MKD)

=== Group 4 ===
Pos	Team	Pld	W	D	L	GF	GA	GD	Pts	Qualification
1	Netherlands (H)	2	2	0	0	51	38	+13	4	Playoffs
2	Estonia	2	1	0	1	51	42	+9	2	
3	Belgium	2	0	0	2	37	59	−22	0	

(H) Hosts

January 15, 2010; 20:00	Estonia	30–20	Belgium	Sporthal Alverberg, Hasselt; Attendance: 1200; Referees: Mäkinen, Jonsson (SWE)
January 15, 2010; 20:00	Patrail, Jaanimaa 7	(16–7)	Dewitt 5	Sporthal Alverberg, Hasselt; Attendance: 1200; Referees: Mäkinen, Jonsson (SWE)
January 15, 2010; 20:00	2× (yellow card) 3× (suspension)	(Report)	2× (yellow card) 5× (suspension)	Sporthal Alverberg, Hasselt; Attendance: 1200; Referees: Mäkinen, Jonsson (SWE)

January 16, 2010; 17:00	Netherlands	22–21	Estonia	Sporthal Alverberg, Hasselt; Attendance: 800; Referees: Mäkinen, Jonsson (SWE)
January 16, 2010; 17:00	Konitz 5	(11–9)	Patrail 5	Sporthal Alverberg, Hasselt; Attendance: 800; Referees: Mäkinen, Jonsson (SWE)
January 16, 2010; 17:00	3× (yellow card) 6× (suspension)	(Report)	3× (yellow card) 3× (suspension)	Sporthal Alverberg, Hasselt; Attendance: 800; Referees: Mäkinen, Jonsson (SWE)

January 17, 2010; 15:00	Netherlands	29–17	Belgium	Sporthal Alverberg, Hasselt; Attendance: 1800; Referees: Mäkinen, Jonsson (SWE)
January 17, 2010; 15:00	Konitz 8	(12–10)	Kopljar I. 5	Sporthal Alverberg, Hasselt; Attendance: 1800; Referees: Mäkinen, Jonsson (SWE)
January 17, 2010; 15:00	2× (yellow card) 2× (suspension)	(Report)	3× (yellow card) 5× (suspension) 1× (red card)	Sporthal Alverberg, Hasselt; Attendance: 1800; Referees: Mäkinen, Jonsson (SWE)

=== Group 5 ===
Pos	Team	Pld	W	D	L	GF	GA	GD	Pts	Qualification
1	Greece	2	2	0	0	63	48	+15	4	Playoffs
2	Montenegro	2	1	0	1	54	55	−1	2	
3	Italy (H)	2	0	0	2	48	62	−14	0	

(H) Hosts

January 15, 2010; 20:00	Greece	34–22	Italy	Pala D'Angelo, Alcamo; Attendance: 1200; Referees: Nielsen, Lorentzen (DEN)
January 15, 2010; 20:00	Sanikis, Tzimourtos 8	(17–12)	Costanzo 4	Pala D'Angelo, Alcamo; Attendance: 1200; Referees: Nielsen, Lorentzen (DEN)
January 15, 2010; 20:00	3× (yellow card) 6× (suspension)	(Report)	3× (yellow card) 3× (suspension)	Pala D'Angelo, Alcamo; Attendance: 1200; Referees: Nielsen, Lorentzen (DEN)

January 16, 2010; 18:45	Montenegro	26–29	Greece	Pala D'Angelo, Alcamo; Attendance: 500; Referees: Nielsen, Lorentzen (DEN)
January 16, 2010; 18:45	Osmajic 6	(10–12)	Vasilakis 9	Pala D'Angelo, Alcamo; Attendance: 500; Referees: Nielsen, Lorentzen (DEN)
January 16, 2010; 18:45	3× (yellow card) 8× (suspension)	(Report)	3× (yellow card) 3× (suspension)	Pala D'Angelo, Alcamo; Attendance: 500; Referees: Nielsen, Lorentzen (DEN)

January 17, 2010; 20:00	Montenegro	28–26	Italy	Pala D'Angelo, Alcamo; Attendance: 1300; Referees: Nielsen, Lorentzen (DEN)
January 17, 2010; 20:00	Markovic 6	(15–11)	Maione 7	Pala D'Angelo, Alcamo; Attendance: 1300; Referees: Nielsen, Lorentzen (DEN)
January 17, 2010; 20:00	3× (yellow card) 5× (suspension)	(Report)	3× (yellow card) 3× (suspension)	Pala D'Angelo, Alcamo; Attendance: 1300; Referees: Nielsen, Lorentzen (DEN)

=== Group 6 ===
Pos	Team	Pld	W	D	L	GF	GA	GD	Pts	Qualification
1	Portugal	2	2	0	0	64	51	+13	4	Playoffs
2	Luxembourg	2	1	0	1	55	64	−9	2	
3	Latvia	2	0	0	2	61	65	−4	0	

January 15, 2010; 19:00	Latvia	31–34	Luxembourg	Centre National Sportif d'Coque, Luxembourg; Attendance: 600; Referees: Kostov I., Kostov M. (BUL)
January 15, 2010; 19:00	Straume 8	(17–15)	Müller 12	Centre National Sportif d'Coque, Luxembourg; Attendance: 600; Referees: Kostov I., Kostov M. (BUL)
January 15, 2010; 19:00	3× (yellow card) 5× (suspension) 1× (red card)	(Report)	3× (yellow card) 5× (suspension) 1× (red card)	Centre National Sportif d'Coque, Luxembourg; Attendance: 600; Referees: Kostov I., Kostov M. (BUL)

January 16, 2010; 15:30	Portugal	31–30	Latvia	Centre National Sportif d'Coque, Luxembourg; Attendance: 300; Referees: Kostov I., Kostov M. (BUL)
January 16, 2010; 15:30	Carneiro, Solha 8	(14–14)	Veršakovs 7	Centre National Sportif d'Coque, Luxembourg; Attendance: 300; Referees: Kostov I., Kostov M. (BUL)
January 16, 2010; 15:30	3× (yellow card) 3× (suspension)	(Report)	3× (yellow card) 4× (suspension)	Centre National Sportif d'Coque, Luxembourg; Attendance: 300; Referees: Kostov I., Kostov M. (BUL)

January 17, 2010; 19:00	Portugal	33–21	Luxembourg	Centre National Sportif d'Coque, Luxembourg; Attendance: 1300; Referees: Kostov I., Kostov M. (BUL)
January 17, 2010; 19:00	Carneiro 7	(18–13)	Poeckes 6	Centre National Sportif d'Coque, Luxembourg; Attendance: 1300; Referees: Kostov I., Kostov M. (BUL)
January 17, 2010; 19:00	3× (yellow card) 10× (suspension)	(Report)	3× (yellow card) 3× (suspension)	Centre National Sportif d'Coque, Luxembourg; Attendance: 1300; Referees: Kostov I., Kostov M. (BUL)

=== Group 7 ===
Pos	Team	Pld	W	D	L	GF	GA	GD	Pts	Qualification
1	Lithuania	2	1	1	0	61	48	+13	3	Playoffs
2	Macedonia	2	1	1	0	59	50	+9	3	
3	Turkey (H)	2	0	0	2	50	72	−22	0	

(H) Hosts

January 15, 2010; 16:00	Macedonia	24–24	Lithuania	Yüreğir Serinevler Spor Salonu, Adana; Attendance: 600; Referees: Fleisch, Rieber (GER)
January 15, 2010; 16:00	Lazarov K. 11	(15–10)	Novickis 7	Yüreğir Serinevler Spor Salonu, Adana; Attendance: 600; Referees: Fleisch, Rieber (GER)
January 15, 2010; 16:00	3× (yellow card) 5× (suspension)	Report	3× (yellow card) 4× (suspension)	Yüreğir Serinevler Spor Salonu, Adana; Attendance: 600; Referees: Fleisch, Rieber (GER)

January 16, 2010; 16:00	Macedonia	35–26	Turkey	Yüreğir Serinevler Spor Salonu, Adana; Attendance: 1,400; Referees: Fleisch, Rieber (GER)
January 16, 2010; 16:00	Mojsovski 11	(15–13)	Döne 9	Yüreğir Serinevler Spor Salonu, Adana; Attendance: 1,400; Referees: Fleisch, Rieber (GER)
January 16, 2010; 16:00	3× (yellow card) 3× (suspension)	Report	3× (yellow card) 10× (suspension) 1× (red card)	Yüreğir Serinevler Spor Salonu, Adana; Attendance: 1,400; Referees: Fleisch, Rieber (GER)

January 17, 2010; 16:00	Lithuania	37–24	Turkey	Yüreğir Serinevler Spor Salonu, Adana; Attendance: 500; Referees: Fleisch, Rieber (GER)
January 17, 2010; 16:00	Novickis 8	(19–13)	Özbahar 6	Yüreğir Serinevler Spor Salonu, Adana; Attendance: 500; Referees: Fleisch, Rieber (GER)
January 17, 2010; 16:00	3× (yellow card) 4× (suspension)	Report	3× (yellow card) 6× (suspension)	Yüreğir Serinevler Spor Salonu, Adana; Attendance: 500; Referees: Fleisch, Rieber (GER)

== Play-off round ==
Will take place on the 12/13 June and 19/20 June 2010. It will comprise 18 teams overall:

- 11 teams from the 2010 European Men's Handball Championship. These won't be the top 3 from the 2010 European Men's Handball Championship, nor Sweden and France.
- 7 group winners from the Qualification Round: Switzerland, Romania, Netherlands, Slovakia, Greece, Portugal, Lithuania.

The draw for the play-off Round will take place on 31 January 2010, in Vienna. Seeding will be based on teams appearance and record on 2010 European Men's Handball Championship.

=== Draw Procedure ===
- Step 1: 1 ball of pot 2 is drawn to pot 1 and two balls of pot 2 are drawn to pot 3 (the balls will not be opened).
- Step 2: One team of pot 1 is drawn against one team of pot 3 (9 times). For each pairing the home and away right will be drawn.

=== Play-offs ===
Team 1	Agg.	Team 2	1st leg	2nd leg
Austria	59–49	Netherlands	31–15	28–34
Norway	51–40	Lithuania	27–19	24–21
Slovenia	52–53	Hungary	27–25	25–28
Germany	52–40	Greece	25–20	27–20
Slovakia	55–51	Ukraine	25–30	30–21
Serbia	49–48	Czech Republic	27–23	22–25
Romania	65–64	Russia	28–32	37–32
Denmark	66–56	Switzerland	32–27	34–29
Portugal	51–60	Spain	26–27	25–33

==== First leg ====
June 12, 2010; 20:20	Austria	31–15	Netherlands	Dornbirn; Referees: Krstic, Ljubic (SLO)
June 12, 2010; 20:20	Szilágyi 7	(15–10)	Konitz 7	Dornbirn; Referees: Krstic, Ljubic (SLO)
June 12, 2010; 20:20	3× (yellow card) 5× (suspension)	(Report)	2× (yellow card) 7× (suspension) 1× (red card)	Dornbirn; Referees: Krstic, Ljubic (SLO)

June 12, 2010; 19:10	Norway	27–19	Lithuania	Stavanger Idrettshall, Stavanger; Attendance: 5 200; Referees: Cirligeanu, Bejinariu (ROU)
June 12, 2010; 19:10	Mamelund 10	(13–9)	Novickis 8	Stavanger Idrettshall, Stavanger; Attendance: 5 200; Referees: Cirligeanu, Bejinariu (ROU)
June 12, 2010; 19:10	3× (yellow card) 2× (suspension)	(Report)	3× (yellow card) 6× (suspension) 1× (red card)	Stavanger Idrettshall, Stavanger; Attendance: 5 200; Referees: Cirligeanu, Bejinariu (ROU)

June 13, 2010; 18:00	Slovenia	27–25	Hungary	Ljubljana; Attendance: 1 500; Referees: Stolarovs, Licis (LAT)
June 13, 2010; 18:00	Vran 6	(12–12)	Iváncsik 10	Ljubljana; Attendance: 1 500; Referees: Stolarovs, Licis (LAT)
June 13, 2010; 18:00	3× (yellow card) 5× (suspension) 1× (red card)	(Report)	3× (yellow card) 4× (suspension)	Ljubljana; Attendance: 1 500; Referees: Stolarovs, Licis (LAT)

June 12, 2010; 18:00	Germany	25–20	Greece	Dortmund; Attendance: 6 500; Referees: Raluy Lopez, Sabroso Ramirez (ESP)
June 12, 2010; 18:00	Gensheimer 8	(14–9)	Karipidis 6	Dortmund; Attendance: 6 500; Referees: Raluy Lopez, Sabroso Ramirez (ESP)
June 12, 2010; 18:00	3× (yellow card) 2× (suspension)	(Report)	3× (yellow card) 3× (suspension)	Dortmund; Attendance: 6 500; Referees: Raluy Lopez, Sabroso Ramirez (ESP)

June 12, 2010; 18:00	Slovakia	25–30	Ukraine	Športová Hala, Hlohovec; Referees: Leifsson, Pálsson (ISL)
June 12, 2010; 18:00	Straňovský, Valo 4	(16–16)	Burka, Ostroushko 8	Športová Hala, Hlohovec; Referees: Leifsson, Pálsson (ISL)
June 12, 2010; 18:00	2× (yellow card) 4× (suspension)	(Report)	1× (yellow card) 6× (suspension) 2× (red card)	Športová Hala, Hlohovec; Referees: Leifsson, Pálsson (ISL)

June 12, 2010; 20:00	Serbia	27–23	Czech Republic	Hala Čair, Niš; Referees: Abrahamsen, Kristiansen (NOR)
June 12, 2010; 20:00	Šešum 8	(16–9)	Filip, Jícha 4	Hala Čair, Niš; Referees: Abrahamsen, Kristiansen (NOR)
June 12, 2010; 20:00	3× (yellow card) 5× (suspension)	(Report)	3× (yellow card) 3× (suspension)	Hala Čair, Niš; Referees: Abrahamsen, Kristiansen (NOR)

June 13, 2010; 19:00	Romania	28–32	Russia	Sala Polivalentă I.K. Ghermănescu, București; Attendance: 3 000; Referees: Horacek, Novotny (CZE)
June 13, 2010; 19:00	Csepreghi, Ghionea 5	(10–12)	Aslanyan 7	Sala Polivalentă I.K. Ghermănescu, București; Attendance: 3 000; Referees: Horacek, Novotny (CZE)
June 13, 2010; 19:00	3× (yellow card) 4× (suspension)	(Report)	3× (yellow card) 3× (suspension)	Sala Polivalentă I.K. Ghermănescu, București; Attendance: 3 000; Referees: Horacek, Novotny (CZE)

June 13, 2010; 20:15	Denmark	32–27	Switzerland	Brøndby Hallen, Brøndby; Attendance: 4 600; Referees: Dinu, Din (ROU)
June 13, 2010; 20:15	Hansen 8	(17–11)	Graubner, Liniger, Ursic 5	Brøndby Hallen, Brøndby; Attendance: 4 600; Referees: Dinu, Din (ROU)
June 13, 2010; 20:15	3× (yellow card)	(Report)	3× (yellow card) 3× (suspension)	Brøndby Hallen, Brøndby; Attendance: 4 600; Referees: Dinu, Din (ROU)

June 13, 2010; 18:00	Portugal	26–27	Spain	Pavilhão EDP – S. L. Benfica, Lisbon; Attendance: 1 300; Referees: Andersen, Sodal (NOR)
June 13, 2010; 18:00	Pedroso 6	(14–14)	Garcia Lorenzana 7	Pavilhão EDP – S. L. Benfica, Lisbon; Attendance: 1 300; Referees: Andersen, Sodal (NOR)
June 13, 2010; 18:00	2× (yellow card) 5× (suspension)	(Report)	3× (yellow card) 4× (suspension)	Pavilhão EDP – S. L. Benfica, Lisbon; Attendance: 1 300; Referees: Andersen, Sodal (NOR)

==== Second leg ====
June 20, 2010; 14:00	Netherlands	34–28	Austria	Ben Kwijt Arena, Emmen; Attendance: 800; Referees: Nikolic, Stojkovic (SRB)
June 20, 2010; 14:00	Schmetz 6	(17–14)	Szilagyi 6	Ben Kwijt Arena, Emmen; Attendance: 800; Referees: Nikolic, Stojkovic (SRB)
June 20, 2010; 14:00	3× (yellow card) 3× (suspension)	(Report)	3× (yellow card) 6× (suspension)	Ben Kwijt Arena, Emmen; Attendance: 800; Referees: Nikolic, Stojkovic (SRB)

June 20, 2010; 19:00	Lithuania	21–24	Norway	Siemens Arena, Vilnius; Attendance: 2300; Referees: Reisinger, Kaschütz (AUT)
June 20, 2010; 19:00	Rackauskas 6	(9 – 10)	Tvedten 8	Siemens Arena, Vilnius; Attendance: 2300; Referees: Reisinger, Kaschütz (AUT)
June 20, 2010; 19:00	2× (yellow card) 5× (suspension) 1× (red card)	(Report)	2× (yellow card) 3× (suspension)	Siemens Arena, Vilnius; Attendance: 2300; Referees: Reisinger, Kaschütz (AUT)

June 20, 2010; 18:00	Hungary	28–25	Slovenia	Veszprém Aréna, Veszprém; Attendance: 5000; Referees: Methe, Methe (GER)
June 20, 2010; 18:00		(13–14)		Veszprém Aréna, Veszprém; Attendance: 5000; Referees: Methe, Methe (GER)
June 20, 2010; 18:00		(Report)		Veszprém Aréna, Veszprém; Attendance: 5000; Referees: Methe, Methe (GER)

June 20, 2010; 19:00	Greece	20–27	Germany	PAOK Sports Arena, Pylaia; Referees: Zotin, Volodkov (RUS)
June 20, 2010; 19:00		(10–10)		PAOK Sports Arena, Pylaia; Referees: Zotin, Volodkov (RUS)
June 20, 2010; 19:00		(Report)		PAOK Sports Arena, Pylaia; Referees: Zotin, Volodkov (RUS)

June 20, 2010; 17:00	Ukraine	21–30	Slovakia	Yunost Palace of Sports, Zaporizhia; Attendance: 1500; Referees: Canbro, Claesson (SWE)
June 20, 2010; 17:00		(12–14)		Yunost Palace of Sports, Zaporizhia; Attendance: 1500; Referees: Canbro, Claesson (SWE)
June 20, 2010; 17:00		(Report)		Yunost Palace of Sports, Zaporizhia; Attendance: 1500; Referees: Canbro, Claesson (SWE)

June 19, 2010	Czech Republic	25–22	Serbia	Sportovní Hala TJ Lokomotiva, Plzeň; Attendance: 1600; Referees: Gjeding, Hansen (DEN)
June 19, 2010		(10–11)		Sportovní Hala TJ Lokomotiva, Plzeň; Attendance: 1600; Referees: Gjeding, Hansen (DEN)
June 19, 2010		(Report)		Sportovní Hala TJ Lokomotiva, Plzeň; Attendance: 1600; Referees: Gjeding, Hansen (DEN)

June 19, 2010; 17:00	Russia	32–37	Romania	Olimpiyskiy-Chekhov, Chekhov; Attendance: 2500; Referees: Nikolov, Nachevski (MKD)
June 19, 2010; 17:00		(13–16)		Olimpiyskiy-Chekhov, Chekhov; Attendance: 2500; Referees: Nikolov, Nachevski (MKD)
June 19, 2010; 17:00		(Report)		Olimpiyskiy-Chekhov, Chekhov; Attendance: 2500; Referees: Nikolov, Nachevski (MKD)

June 20, 2010; 16:45	Switzerland	29–34	Denmark	Athletik Zentrum St. Gallen, St. Gallen; Attendance: 3200; Referees: Lazaar, Reveret (FRA)
June 20, 2010; 16:45		(10–15)		Athletik Zentrum St. Gallen, St. Gallen; Attendance: 3200; Referees: Lazaar, Reveret (FRA)
June 20, 2010; 16:45		(Report)		Athletik Zentrum St. Gallen, St. Gallen; Attendance: 3200; Referees: Lazaar, Reveret (FRA)

June 18, 2010; 20:30	Spain	33–25	Portugal	Guadalajara; Attendance: 4700; Referees: Kekes, Kekes (HUN)
June 18, 2010; 20:30		(15–11)		Guadalajara; Attendance: 4700; Referees: Kekes, Kekes (HUN)
June 18, 2010; 20:30		(Report)		Guadalajara; Attendance: 4700; Referees: Kekes, Kekes (HUN)
