= 2007 World Men's Handball Championship – Qualification =

Qualification matches for the 2007 World Men's Handball Championship took place January 3 to June 18, 2006. 2006, mostly as continental championships. According to the IHF rules, each continent had three places (except Oceania, which had one), and the host (Germany) and holders (Spain) were automatically qualified. The other nine places are allocated to the continents according to performance in the 2005 World Men's Handball Championship. Thus:

- Europe had 13 places
- Africa 4 places
- Asia 3 places
- Americas (North and South together) 3 places
- Oceania 1 place

== Africa ==
The 2006 African Men's Handball Championship in Tunisia resulted in four teams qualifying for the tournament.

- Angola
- Egypt
- Morocco
- Tunisia

== Americas ==
The Pan-American qualifying events was scheduled to be held in Brazil in April 2006. However, due to players' commitments with clubs in Europe, it was agreed to postpone the qualifying until June, and the tournament was eventually held from 6 June to 10 June at Aracaju.

Eight teams participated, and Brazil and Argentina went through the group stages unbeaten, as the only teams with positive goal difference. The two top teams in each group qualified for the semi-finals: Greenland joined Brazil from Group A after two 32–30 wins over Chile and Uruguay, while in Group B United States qualified after drawing with Mexico and beating Puerto Rico.

In the semi-finals, Brazil and Argentina both won by more than ten goals, securing their place in Germany, while the third-place play-off saw Greenland prevail by one goal against United States to secure the third spot.

- Brazil
- Argentina
- Greenland

== Asia ==
Asia's qualifying events, the 2006 Asian Handball Championship took place in Thailand between 12 February and 21 February 2006. Kuwait and South Korea qualified after winning the semi-finals, while Qatar beat Iran 21–20 in the third-place play-off to be the final team to qualify

- Kuwait
- South Korea
- Qatar

== Europe ==
Eleven places were at stake (Germany and Spain were already qualified), and the top three finishers at the 2006 European Men's Handball Championship in Switzerland in January and February 2006 qualified. As Spain qualified for the semi-final at that tournament, the other three semi-finalists – Croatia, Denmark and France – qualified. The other 11 participants at the European Championship played off with five winners in preliminary qualifying groups, which are shown below.

=== First round ===
Final standings (as of 20 January 2006):

==== Group 1 ====
Pos	Team	Pld	W	D	L	GF	GA	GD	Pts	Qualification
1	Greece	6	4	0	2	164	148	+16	**8**	Playoffs
2	Bosnia and Herzegovina	6	4	0	2	182	169	+13	**8**	
3	Netherlands	6	2	0	4	159	181	−22	**4**	
4	Italy	6	2	0	4	157	181	−24	**4**	

==== Group 2 ====
Pos	Team	Pld	W	D	L	GF	GA	GD	Pts	Qualification
1	Austria	6	5	0	1	205	161	+44	**10**	Playoffs
2	Finland	6	3	0	3	173	170	+3	**6**	
3	Israel	6	3	0	3	171	173	−2	**6**	
4	Bulgaria	6	1	0	5	153	198	−45	**2**	

==== Group 3 ====
Pos	Team	Pld	W	D	L	GF	GA	GD	Pts	Qualification
1	Czech Republic	6	5	0	1	219	149	+70	**10**	Playoffs
2	Macedonia	6	4	1	1	200	176	+24	**9**	
3	Estonia	6	2	1	3	169	182	−13	**5**	
4	Cyprus	6	0	0	6	133	214	−81	**0**	

==== Group 4 ====
Pos	Team	Pld	W	D	L	GF	GA	GD	Pts	Qualification
1	Romania	6	5	1	0	186	143	+43	**16**	Playoffs
2	Lithuania	6	3	1	2	174	149	+25	**10**	
3	Latvia	6	2	0	4	177	169	+8	**6**	
4	Luxembourg	6	1	0	5	129	205	−76	**3**	

==== Group 5 ====
Pos	Team	Pld	W	D	L	GF	GA	GD	Pts	Qualification
1	Sweden	6	6	0	0	223	139	+84	**12**	Playoffs
2	Belarus	6	4	0	2	189	160	+29	**8**	
3	Turkey	6	2	0	4	140	197	−57	**4**	
4	Belgium	6	0	0	6	155	211	−56	**0**	

=== Play-offs ===
The play-off draw was made in Zürich on 5 February. The matches are two-legged affairs, and were played in the second and third weekend of June. Teams in bold below qualified for the World Championship.

Team 1	Agg.	Team 2	1st leg	2nd leg
Greece	47–51	**Poland**	27–22	20–29
Portugal	47–55	**Ukraine**	21–30	26–25
Romania	56–57	**Norway**	29–30	27–27
Serbia and Montenegro	58–73	**Czech Republic**	31–37	27–36
**Slovenia**	67–51	Austria	36–26	31–25
Slovakia	52–65	**Hungary**	24–33	28–32
Sweden	54–57	**Iceland**	28–32	26–25
Switzerland	54–85	**Russia**	26–41	28–44

== Oceania ==
The Oceanian qualifying tournament, took place in Dural, Sydney from 22 May to 24 May 2006, immediately before the Pacific Cup

Australia qualified for the world championships after defeating New Zealand 41–14 and the Cook Islands 63–5.
