= 2010 European Men's Handball Championship qualification – Group 5 =

The qualification group 5 for the 2010 European Men's Handball Championship includes the national teams of Belarus, Bulgaria, Germany, Israel and Slovenia.

== Standings ==
Pos	Team	Pld	W	D	L	GF	GA	GD	Pts	Qualification	GER	SLO	BLR	ISR	BUL
1	Germany	8	8	0	0	300	191	+109	16	Final tournament	—	38–30	38–27	36–24	42–11
2	Slovenia	8	6	0	2	293	221	+72	12	Final tournament	26–27	—	38–26	40–27	47–20
3	Belarus	8	4	0	4	253	233	+20	8		23–25	32–36	—	38–31	36–18
4	Israel	8	2	0	6	222	269	−47	4		21–40	28–36	28–31	—	29–20
5	Bulgaria	8	0	0	8	168	322	−154	0		29–54	23–40	19–40	28–34	—

== Fixtures and results ==
October 29, 2008; 19:30 CET	Germany	42:11	Bulgaria	Rittal Arena Wetzlar, Wetzlar; Attendance: 4,400; Referees: Argyrou, Loizou (CYP)
October 29, 2008; 19:30 CET	Kaufmann 5	(22:4)	Stankov 4	Rittal Arena Wetzlar, Wetzlar; Attendance: 4,400; Referees: Argyrou, Loizou (CYP)
October 29, 2008; 19:30 CET	3× (yellow card) 1× (suspension)	Report	3× (yellow card) 3× (suspension)	Rittal Arena Wetzlar, Wetzlar; Attendance: 4,400; Referees: Argyrou, Loizou (CYP)

October 29, 2008; 19:40 CET	Israel	28:36	Slovenia	Maccabi House Arena, Rishon LeZion; Attendance: 800; Referees: Cirligeanu, Bejenariu (ROU)
October 29, 2008; 19:40 CET	Smoler 10	(16:21)	Pajovič 7	Maccabi House Arena, Rishon LeZion; Attendance: 800; Referees: Cirligeanu, Bejenariu (ROU)
October 29, 2008; 19:40 CET	3× (yellow card) 7× (suspension)	Report	3× (yellow card) 5× (suspension)	Maccabi House Arena, Rishon LeZion; Attendance: 800; Referees: Cirligeanu, Bejenariu (ROU)

November 2, 2008; 17:00 CET	Slovenia	26:27	Germany	Zlatorog Arena, Celje; Attendance: 5,500; Referees: Baum, Goralczyk (POL)
November 2, 2008; 17:00 CET	Pajovič 7	(16:21)	Preiß 6	Zlatorog Arena, Celje; Attendance: 5,500; Referees: Baum, Goralczyk (POL)
November 2, 2008; 17:00 CET	3× (yellow card) 1× (suspension)	Report	3× (yellow card) 3× (suspension) 1× (red card)	Zlatorog Arena, Celje; Attendance: 5,500; Referees: Baum, Goralczyk (POL)

November 2, 2008; 17:00 CET	Bulgaria	28:34	Israel	Pirin Sports Hall, Blagoevgrad; Attendance: 500; Referees: Pavicevic, Vujisic (MNE)
November 2, 2008; 17:00 CET	Borisov 10	(15:20)	Smoler 9	Pirin Sports Hall, Blagoevgrad; Attendance: 500; Referees: Pavicevic, Vujisic (MNE)
November 2, 2008; 17:00 CET	3× (yellow card) 3× (suspension)	Report	3× (yellow card) 3× (suspension)	Pirin Sports Hall, Blagoevgrad; Attendance: 500; Referees: Pavicevic, Vujisic (MNE)

November 26, 2008; 18:00 CET	Bulgaria	23:40	Slovenia	Varna; Attendance: 300; Referees: Aliyev, Aghakishiyev (AZE)
November 26, 2008; 18:00 CET	Chakmakov 9	(14:19)	Gajić 9	Varna; Attendance: 300; Referees: Aliyev, Aghakishiyev (AZE)
November 26, 2008; 18:00 CET	3× (yellow card) 4× (suspension)	Report	3× (yellow card) 4× (suspension)	Varna; Attendance: 300; Referees: Aliyev, Aghakishiyev (AZE)

November 26, 2008; 19:00 CET	Belarus	38:31	Israel	Sportshall Victoria, Brest; Attendance: 3,700; Referees: Opava, Valek (CZE)
November 26, 2008; 19:00 CET	Harbok 12	(21:14)	Avraham 7	Sportshall Victoria, Brest; Attendance: 3,700; Referees: Opava, Valek (CZE)
November 26, 2008; 19:00 CET	3× (yellow card) 3× (suspension)	Report	2× (yellow card) 8× (suspension) 1× (red card)	Sportshall Victoria, Brest; Attendance: 3,700; Referees: Opava, Valek (CZE)

November 29, 2008; 18:00 CET	Israel	28:31	Belarus	Maccabi House Arena, Rishon LeZion; Attendance: 1,000; Referees: Korres, Migas (GRE)
November 29, 2008; 18:00 CET	Matalon 6	(11:19)	Harbok 7	Maccabi House Arena, Rishon LeZion; Attendance: 1,000; Referees: Korres, Migas (GRE)
November 29, 2008; 18:00 CET	3× (yellow card) 5× (suspension)	Report	3× (yellow card) 5× (suspension)	Maccabi House Arena, Rishon LeZion; Attendance: 1,000; Referees: Korres, Migas (GRE)

November 30, 2008; 17:00 CET	Slovenia	47:20	Bulgaria	Rdeca Dvorana, Velenje; Attendance: 2,100; Referees: Buache, von Escher (SUI)
November 30, 2008; 17:00 CET	Žvižej 7	(23:11)	Chakmakov 7	Rdeca Dvorana, Velenje; Attendance: 2,100; Referees: Buache, von Escher (SUI)
November 30, 2008; 17:00 CET	3× (yellow card) 4× (suspension)	Report	3× (yellow card) 4× (suspension)	Rdeca Dvorana, Velenje; Attendance: 2,100; Referees: Buache, von Escher (SUI)

March 18, 2009; 20:00 CET	Belarus	23:25	Germany	Minsk; Attendance: 3,500; Referees: Andersen, Sodal (NOR)
March 18, 2009; 20:00 CET	Preiß 9	(11:16)	Pukhouski 7	Minsk; Attendance: 3,500; Referees: Andersen, Sodal (NOR)
March 18, 2009; 20:00 CET	3× (yellow card) 4× (suspension)	Report	3× (yellow card) 4× (suspension)	Minsk; Attendance: 3,500; Referees: Andersen, Sodal (NOR)

March 18, 2009; 19:45 CET	Israel	29:20	Bulgaria	Goshen, Kiryat Motzkin; Attendance: 800; Referees: Naumovski, Cavdarov (MKD)
March 18, 2009; 19:45 CET	Smoler, Pomeranz 6	(16:10)	Petkov 8	Goshen, Kiryat Motzkin; Attendance: 800; Referees: Naumovski, Cavdarov (MKD)
March 18, 2009; 19:45 CET	3× (yellow card) 3× (suspension)	Report	3× (yellow card) 3× (suspension)	Goshen, Kiryat Motzkin; Attendance: 800; Referees: Naumovski, Cavdarov (MKD)

March 21, 2009; 17:00 CET	Bulgaria	19:40	Belarus	Samokov; Attendance: 500; Referees: Gökmen, Gök (TUR)
March 21, 2009; 17:00 CET	Chekmakov 6	(8:19)	Kurchev 8	Samokov; Attendance: 500; Referees: Gökmen, Gök (TUR)
March 21, 2009; 17:00 CET	3× (yellow card) 3× (suspension)	Report	3× (yellow card) 5× (suspension)	Samokov; Attendance: 500; Referees: Gökmen, Gök (TUR)

March 22, 2009; 15:30 CET	Germany	36:24	Israel	Aschaffenburg; Attendance: 4,200; Referees: Nikolic, Stojkovic (SRB)
March 22, 2009; 15:30 CET	Avraham 12	(17:15)	Müller 6	Aschaffenburg; Attendance: 4,200; Referees: Nikolic, Stojkovic (SRB)
March 22, 2009; 15:30 CET	3× (yellow card) 3× (suspension)	Report	2× (yellow card) 4× (suspension)	Aschaffenburg; Attendance: 4,200; Referees: Nikolic, Stojkovic (SRB)

June 10, 2009; 17:00 CET	Bulgaria	29:54	Germany	Samokov; Attendance: 200; Referees: Brkic, Jusufhodzic (AUT)
June 10, 2009; 17:00 CET	Ruskov 10	(9:25)	Schöne 17	Samokov; Attendance: 200; Referees: Brkic, Jusufhodzic (AUT)
June 10, 2009; 17:00 CET	3× (yellow card) 3× (suspension)	Report	2× (yellow card) 3× (suspension)	Samokov; Attendance: 200; Referees: Brkic, Jusufhodzic (AUT)

June 10, 2009; 20:15 CET	Slovenia	38:26	Belarus	Hala Kodeljevo, Ljubljana; Attendance: 3,000; Referees: Horacek, Novotny (CZE)
June 10, 2009; 20:15 CET	Brumen 7	(17:13)	Pukhouski 9	Hala Kodeljevo, Ljubljana; Attendance: 3,000; Referees: Horacek, Novotny (CZE)
June 10, 2009; 20:15 CET	3× (yellow card) 4× (suspension)	Report	3× (yellow card) 6× (suspension)	Hala Kodeljevo, Ljubljana; Attendance: 3,000; Referees: Horacek, Novotny (CZE)

June 13, 2009; 17:00 CET	Belarus	36:18	Bulgaria	Minsk; Attendance: 1,500; Referees: Mishchuk, Rozhkov (UKR)
June 13, 2009; 17:00 CET	Pukhouski 6	(19:9)	Ruskov 8	Minsk; Attendance: 1,500; Referees: Mishchuk, Rozhkov (UKR)
June 13, 2009; 17:00 CET	2× (yellow card)	Report	3× (yellow card) 3× (suspension)	Minsk; Attendance: 1,500; Referees: Mishchuk, Rozhkov (UKR)

June 13, 2009; 18:15 CET	Germany	38:30	Slovenia	Color Line Arena, Hamburg; Attendance: 9,000; Referees: Leifsson, Palsson (ISL)
June 13, 2009; 18:15 CET	Schröder 11	(20:12)	three players 5	Color Line Arena, Hamburg; Attendance: 9,000; Referees: Leifsson, Palsson (ISL)
June 13, 2009; 18:15 CET	3× (yellow card) 7× (suspension)	Report	3× (yellow card) 5× (suspension)	Color Line Arena, Hamburg; Attendance: 9,000; Referees: Leifsson, Palsson (ISL)

June 17, 2009; 18:15 CET	Slovenia	40:27	Israel	Ljubljana; Attendance: 3,000; Referees: Chaskis, Tsakonas (GRE)
June 17, 2009; 18:15 CET	Žvižej 10	(20:17)	Pomeranz 6	Ljubljana; Attendance: 3,000; Referees: Chaskis, Tsakonas (GRE)
June 17, 2009; 18:15 CET	3× (yellow card) 2× (suspension)	Report	3× (yellow card) 5× (suspension)	Ljubljana; Attendance: 3,000; Referees: Chaskis, Tsakonas (GRE)

June 17, 2009; 19:30 CET	Germany	38:27	Belarus	Porsche-Arena, Stuttgart; Attendance: 6,200; Referees: Lorente, Garcia Serradilla (ESP)
June 17, 2009; 19:30 CET	Gensheimer 10	(18:12)	Kurchev 8	Porsche-Arena, Stuttgart; Attendance: 6,200; Referees: Lorente, Garcia Serradilla (ESP)
June 17, 2009; 19:30 CET	3× (yellow card) 3× (suspension)	Report	3× (yellow card) 4× (suspension)	Porsche-Arena, Stuttgart; Attendance: 6,200; Referees: Lorente, Garcia Serradilla (ESP)

June 21, 2009; 17:00 CET	Belarus	32:36	Slovenia	Palace of Sport, Minsk; Attendance: 2,000; Referees: C. Kekes, P. Kekes (HUN)
June 21, 2009; 17:00 CET	Kurchev 9	(17:18)	Gajić, Žvižej 6	Palace of Sport, Minsk; Attendance: 2,000; Referees: C. Kekes, P. Kekes (HUN)
June 21, 2009; 17:00 CET	4× (yellow card) 6× (suspension)	Report	3× (yellow card) 7× (suspension)	Palace of Sport, Minsk; Attendance: 2,000; Referees: C. Kekes, P. Kekes (HUN)

June 21, 2009; 19:30 CET	Israel	21:40	Germany	Maccabi House Arena, Rishon LeZion; Attendance: 1,000; Referees: Meyer, Stalder (SUI)
June 21, 2009; 19:30 CET	Pomeranz 6	(12:17)	Oprea 8	Maccabi House Arena, Rishon LeZion; Attendance: 1,000; Referees: Meyer, Stalder (SUI)
June 21, 2009; 19:30 CET	3× (yellow card) 7× (suspension)	Report	3× (yellow card) 4× (suspension)	Maccabi House Arena, Rishon LeZion; Attendance: 1,000; Referees: Meyer, Stalder (SUI)
