= Igor Marković =

Montenegrin handball player (born 1981)

Personal information
- Nationality: Montenegrin
- Born: December 16, 1981 (age 44) Cetinje, SFR Yugoslavia
- Height: 1.83 m (6 ft 0 in)

Sport
- Sport: Handball
- Position: Left wing

Youth career
- Years: Team
- –: RK Lovćen

Senior clubs
- Years: Team
- 2002–2009: RK Lovćen
- 2009–2010: Budućnost Podgorica
- 2010–2013: RK Lovćen
- 2013: Al-Qurine
- 2013–2015: RK Lovćen
- 2015–2020: Komlói Bányász
- 2020–2022: RK Lovćen
National team
Years	Team	Apps	(Gls)
2007–2018	Montenegro	52	(116)

Igor Marković (born 16 December 1981) is a Montenegrin former handball player.

Marković was a member of Montenegro national handball team since it was established in 2007. Today, he is a player with most played official games for Montenegro (49) and a fourth top scorer in the national team history, with 125 goals.

== Career ==
Marković started his career in the youth teams of Cepelin Cetinje and Lovćen Cetinje. During his professional career, he played for Montenegrin clubs Lovćen Cetinje and Budućnost Podgorica. As of autumn 2013, he played for the Kuwaitian side AlQurine at the Arab Champions League.

With the Montenegrin national team, Igor Marković played at the World Championship 2013 and the Euro 2014. He is the player with most official games for Montenegro and the fourth top scorer in the national team's history.

Tournament	Matches	Goals
World Championship	7	22
European Championship	3	11
Qualifying matches EC/WC	39	92
Overall	49	125

== Awards and accomplishments ==
=== Club ===
RK Lovćen

- Montenegrin League: 2006–07, 2011–12, 2012–13, 2013–14
- Serbia and Montenegro Cup: 2002–03
- Winner of the Montenegrin Cup: 2008–09, 2010–11, 2011–12, 2012–13, 2013–14

RK Budućnost

- Montenegrin League: 2009–10

=== Individual ===
- Best handball player in Montenegro: 2010, 2011, 2012, 2013
