= 2008 European Men's Handball Championship qualification =

Qualification matches for the 2008 European Men's Handball Championship took place in 2007. According to the EHF rules host (Norway), and the top six nations from the 2006 European Championship (France, Croatia, Spain, Denmark, Germany, Russia) were automatically qualified. The other nine places will be determined in play-offs in June; nine teams are seeded after qualifying for the 2006 Championship, while their opponents qualified through the preliminary group stages.

== Summary ==
Below is a table containing all seven qualifying groups. Teams that have secured a place in the final tournament are highlighted in green. The order of teams is by play off position.

Group 1	Group 2	Group 3	Group 4	Group 5	Group 6	Group 7
Belarus; Slovakia	Serbia; Macedonia	Romania; Latvia	Montenegro; Netherlands	Switzerland; Lithuania	Portugal	Sweden
Cyprus; Moldova	Israel; Luxembourg	Bulgaria; Georgia	Austria; Finland	Italy; Turkey	Greece; Estonia	Bosnia and Herzegovina; Belgium

=== Group stage ===
Final standings (as of 30 January 2007)

==== Group 1 ====
Pos	Team	Pld	W	D	L	GF	GA	GD	Pts	Qualification
1	Belarus	3	3	0	0	100	74	+26	6	Playoffs
2	Slovakia	3	2	0	1	100	74	+26	4	Playoffs
3	Cyprus	3	1	0	2	71	86	−15	2	
4	Moldova	3	0	0	3	73	110	−37	0	

Source: EHF

==== Group 2 ====
Pos	Team	Pld	W	D	L	GF	GA	GD	Pts	Qualification
1	Serbia	6	4	1	1	220	164	+56	9	Playoffs
2	Macedonia	6	4	1	1	185	179	+6	9	Playoffs
3	Israel	6	3	0	3	172	174	−2	6	
4	Luxembourg	6	0	0	6	149	209	−60	0	

Source: EHF

==== Group 3 ====
Pos	Team	Pld	W	D	L	GF	GA	GD	Pts	Qualification
1	Romania	6	6	0	0	203	153	+50	12	Playoffs
2	Latvia	6	4	0	2	187	167	+20	8	Playoffs
3	Bulgaria	6	1	0	5	140	171	−31	2	
4	Georgia	6	1	0	5	140	179	−39	2	

Source: EHF

==== Group 4 ====
Pos	Team	Pld	W	D	L	GF	GA	GD	Pts	Qualification
1	Montenegro	6	5	1	0	200	171	+29	11	Playoffs
2	Netherlands	6	3	1	2	186	186	0	7	Playoffs
3	Austria	6	3	0	3	183	178	+5	6	
4	Finland	6	0	0	6	165	199	−34	0	

Source: EHF

==== Group 5 ====
Pos	Team	Pld	W	D	L	GF	GA	GD	Pts	Qualification
1	Switzerland	6	6	0	0	186	151	+35	12	Playoffs
2	Lithuania	6	3	0	3	186	188	−2	6	Playoffs
3	Italy	6	2	0	4	173	187	−14	4	
4	Turkey	6	1	0	5	167	186	−19	2	

Source: EHF

==== Group 6 ====
Pos	Team	Pld	W	D	L	GF	GA	GD	Pts	Qualification
1	Portugal	4	3	0	1	115	94	+21	6	Playoffs
2	Greece	4	3	0	1	107	98	+9	6	
3	Estonia	4	0	0	4	95	125	−30	0	

Source: EHF

==== Group 7 ====
Pos	Team	Pld	W	D	L	GF	GA	GD	Pts	Qualification
1	Sweden	4	4	0	0	139	106	+33	8	Playoffs
2	Bosnia and Herzegovina	4	2	0	2	143	121	+22	4	
3	Belgium	4	0	0	4	109	164	−55	0	

Source: EHF

=== Play-off ===
The play-off draw was made in Vienna on 26 January 2007. The matches were two-legged affairs, and were played in the second and third weekends of June.

Team 1	Agg.	Team 2	1st leg	2nd leg
Poland	72-47	Netherlands	31–20	41–27
Lithuania	53–59	Hungary	23–28	30–31
Ukraine	48–63	Slovakia	29–28	19–35
Slovenia	66–60	Macedonia	33–28	33–32
Latvia	56–64	Czech Republic	30–31	26–33
Belarus	61–54	Switzerland	33–24	28–30
Sweden	69–59	Romania	36–25	33–34
Portugal	55–63	Montenegro	28–30	27–33
Serbia	70–71	Iceland	30–29	40–42
