= Blažo Lisičić =

Montenegrin handball player (born 1972)

Personal information
- Full name: Blažo Lisičić
- Nationality: Montenegrin
- Born: 22 August 1972 (age 54) Titograd, SR Montenegro, SFR Yugoslavia
- Height: 2.02 m (6 ft 8 in)

Sport
- Sport: Handball
- Position: Right back

Youth career
- Years: Team
- –: Proleter Zrenjanin

Senior clubs
- Years: Team
- 1989–1993: Proleter Zrenjanin
- 1993–1994: Crvena zvezda
- 1994–1996: Partizan
- 1996–1997: Pozoblanco
- 1997: TV Niederwürzbach
- 1998–2000: HSG Dutenhofen/Münchholzhausen
- 2000–2002: GWD Minden
- 2002–2003: Conversano
- 2003–2005: Al Sadd
- 2005–2006: Zagreb
- 2006–2008: Casarano
- 2008–2010: Lovćen
National team
- Years: Team
- 1996–2003: FR Yugoslavia
- 2006–2008: Montenegro
Medal record
Men's handball
Representing FR Yugoslavia
World Championship
Bronze medal – third place	1999 Egypt	Team
Bronze medal – third place	2001 France	Team
European Championship
Bronze medal – third place	1996 Spain	Team

Blažo Lisičić (born 22 August 1972) is a Montenegrin former handball player.

== Club career ==
Born in Titograd, Lisičić was signed by Proleter Zrenjanin as a teenager. He would become a member of the team that won two Yugoslav Championship titles and reached the European Cup final in the 1990–91 season. Between 1993 and 1996, Lisičić played for Belgrade arch-rivals Crvena zvezda and Partizan.

In 1996, Lisičić moved abroad to Spain and signed with Pozoblanco. He spent one season with the Liga ASOBAL club, but failed to help them avoid relegation. From 1997 to 2002, Lisičić played for three teams in Germany, namely TV Niederwürzbach, HSG Dutenhofen/Münchholzhausen, and GWD Minden.

Later on, Lisičić would also spend some time in Italy (Conversano and Casarano), Qatar (Al Sadd), and Croatia (Zagreb). He lastly played for Lovćen in his native Montenegro, adding two more trophies to his collection, before retiring.

== International career ==
At international level, Lisičić competed for FR Yugoslavia in five major tournaments between 1996 and 2003, winning three bronze medals.

After the split of Serbia and Montenegro, Lisičić represented Montenegro, helping the nation qualify for the 2008 European Championship.

== Honours ==
Proleter Zrenjanin

- Yugoslav Handball Championship: 1989–90, 1991–92

Partizan

- Handball Championship of FR Yugoslavia: 1994–95

Al Sadd

- Qatar Handball League: 2003–04

Zagreb

- Croatian Handball Premier League: 2005–06
- Croatian Handball Cup: 2005–06

Lovćen

- Montenegrin Men's Handball Cup: 2008–09, 2009–10
