= Žarko Pejović =

Montenegrin handball player (born 1986)

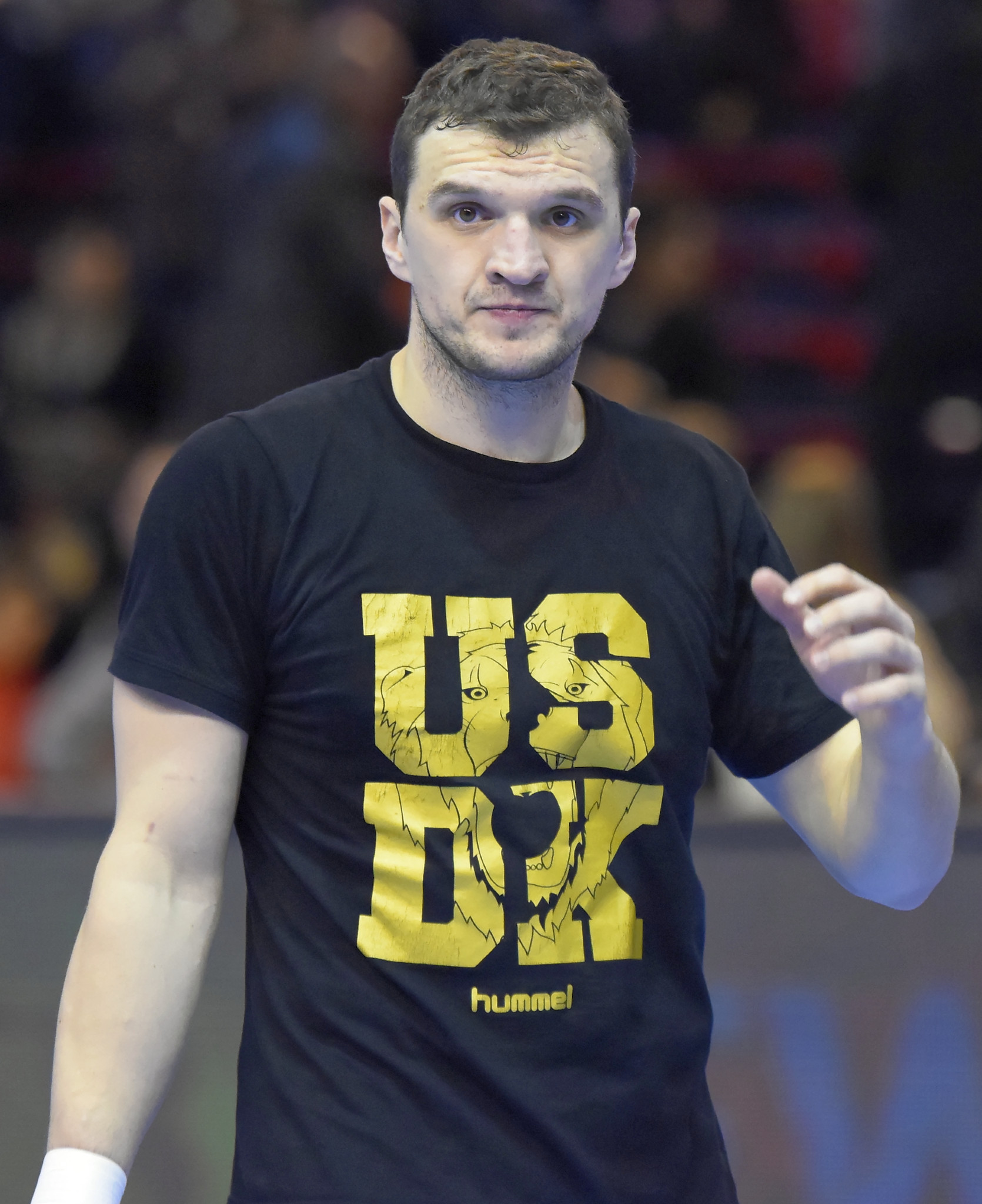

Personal information
- Nationality: Montenegrin
- Born: 25 January 1986 (age 40) Mojkovac, Montenegro
- Height: 1.91 m (6 ft 3 in)

Sport
- Sport: Handball
- Position: Central back
- Current club: RK Tineks Prolet
- Number: 99
National team
Years	Team	Apps	(Gls)
–	Montenegro	25	(14)

Žarko Pejović (born 25 January 1986) is a Montenegrin handball player for RK Tineks Prolet and the Montenegrin national team.
