= Alen Muratović =

Montenegrin handball player (born 1979)

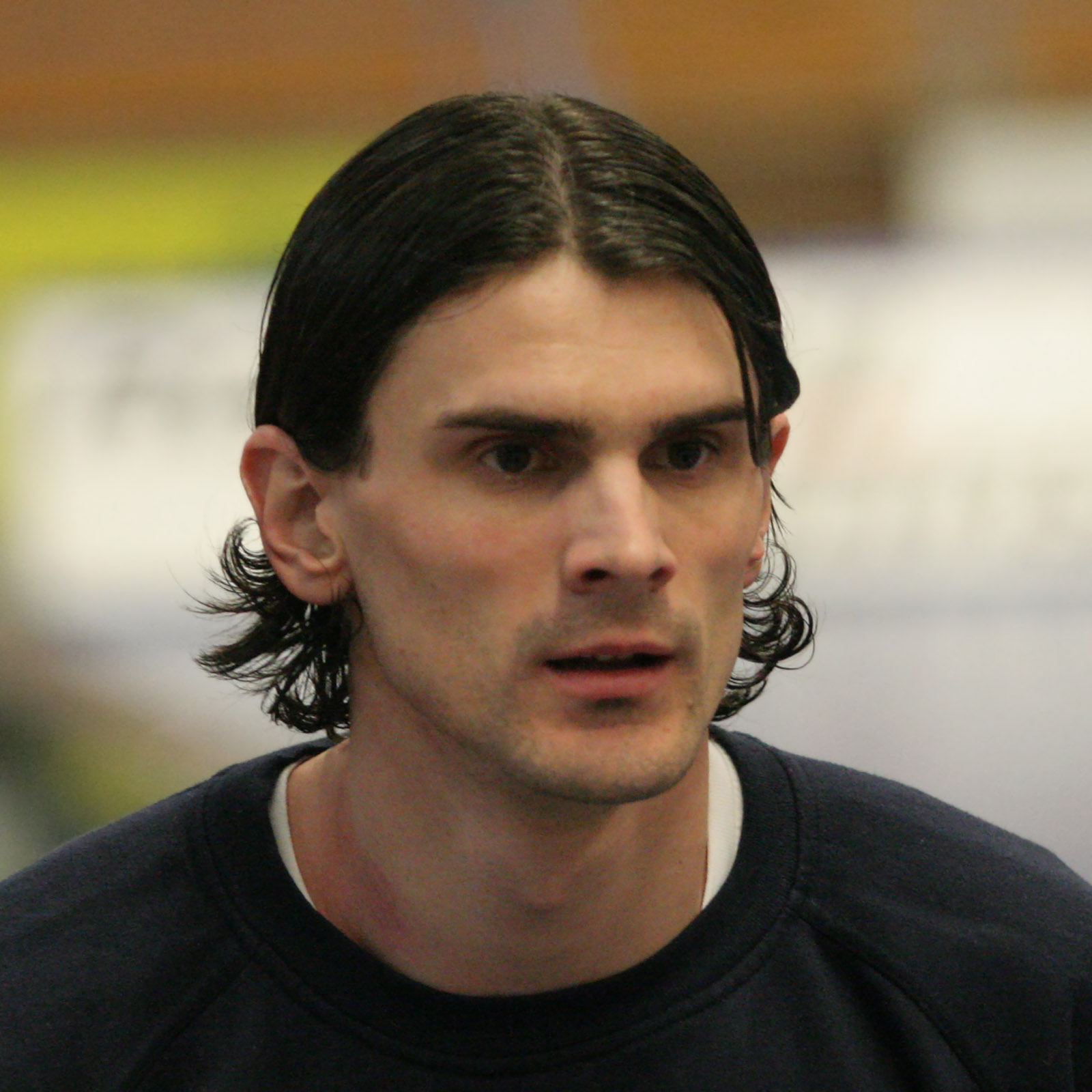
- Muratović in 2008

Personal information
- Full name: Alen Muratović
- Nationality: Montenegrin
- Born: 23 October 1979 (age 46) Nikšić, SR Montenegro, SFR Yugoslavia
- Height: 1.98 m (6 ft 6 in)

Sport
- Sport: Handball
- Position: Left back

Youth career
- Years: Team
- –: Sutjeska Nikšić

Senior clubs
- Years: Team
- –: Budućnost Podgorica
- 2001–2003: Lovćen
- 2003–2005: Cangas
- 2005–2008: Valladolid
- 2008–2010: SG Flensburg-Handewitt
- 2013–2021: Cangas
- 2022: SD Atlético Novás
National team
Years	Team		
2005–2006	Serbia and Montenegro		
2006–2008	Montenegro	16	(88)

Alen Muratović (born 23 October 1979) is a Montenegrin former handball player.

== Club career ==
After playing for Budućnost Podgorica, Muratović joined Yugoslav champions Lovćen in 2001. He helped them win two consecutive national cups (2002 and 2003). In 2003, Muratović moved abroad to Spain and signed with Cangas. He would switch to fellow Liga ASOBAL club Valladolid in 2005.

In 2008, Muratović was transferred to German team SG Flensburg-Handewitt. He suffered a shoulder injury during a friendly game in January 2009, causing him to miss the rest of the season. In May 2010, his contract was terminated by mutual consent.

In 2013, Muratović returned to handball and joined his former club Cangas.

== International career ==
At international level, Muratović represented Serbia and Montenegro at the 2005 World Championship and 2006 European Championship. He was later a founding member of the Montenegro national team, taking part in the 2008 European Championship.

== Honours ==
Lovćen

- Serbia and Montenegro Handball Cup: 2001–02, 2002–03
