= Zoran Roganović =

Montenegrin handball player (born 1977)

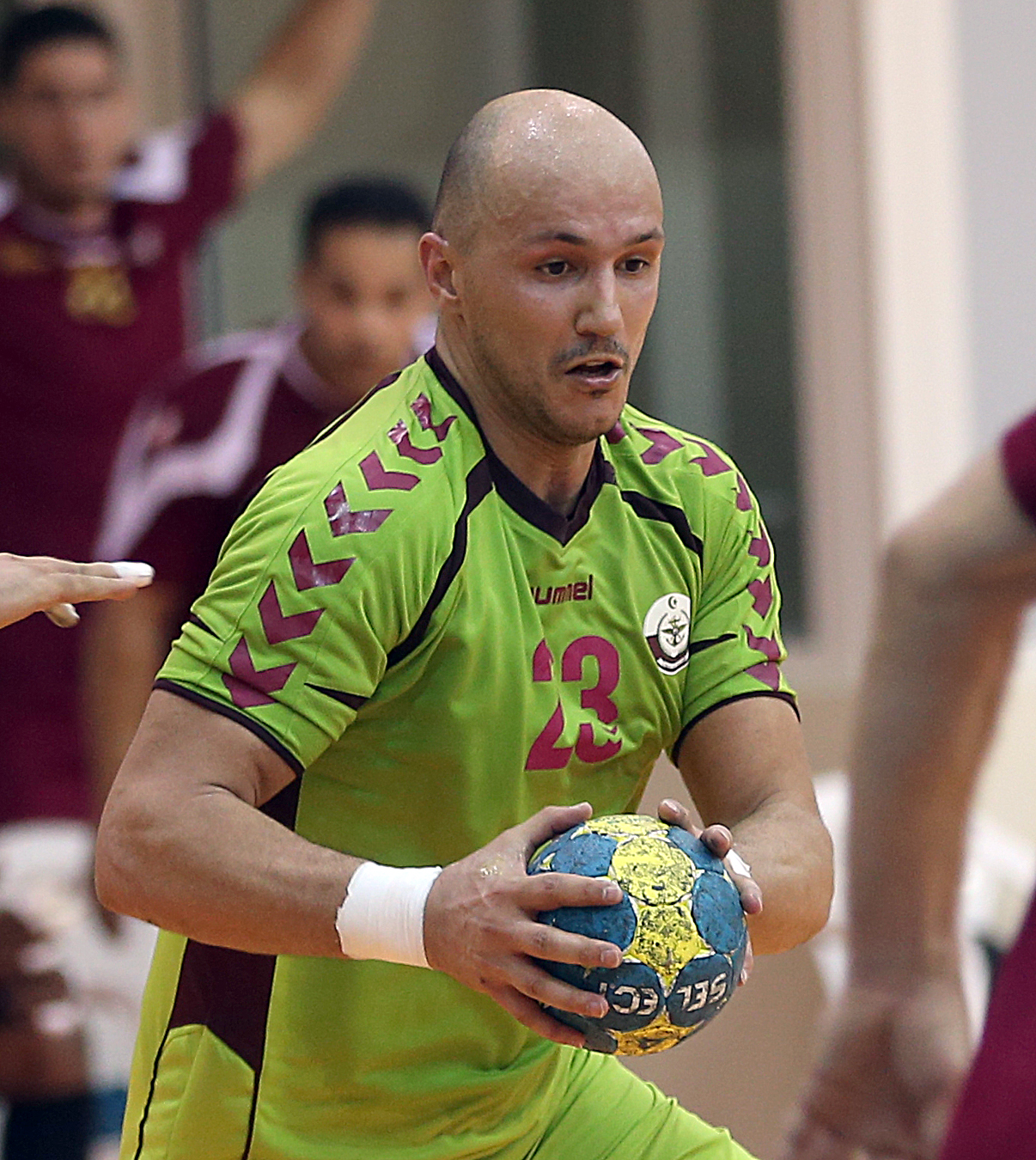
- Roganović in 2013

Personal information
- Full name: Zoran Roganović
- Nationality: Montenegrin
- Born: 26 December 1977 (age 48) Cetinje, SFR Yugoslavia
- Height: 1.93 m (6 ft 4 in)

Sport
- Sport: Handball
- Position: Right back
- Current club: Eskilstuna Guif (coach)

Senior clubs
- Years: Team
- –: Lovćen
- 1998–2000: Partizan
- 2000–2001: Maia
- 2001–2002: Filippos
- 2002–2003: Borac Banja Luka
- 2003–2014: H43 Lund
- 2006: → Aragón (loan)
- 2010: → Al Sadd Beirut (loan)
- 2013: → Al Qiyadah (loan)
- 2013: → El Jaish (loan)
- 2014: → Lekhwiya (loan)
- 2014–2016: Lugi HF
- 2016–2017: HK Malmö
- 2017–2018: H43 Lund
National team
Years	Team	Apps	(Gls)
2007–2014	Montenegro	34	(158)

Teams managed
- 2018–2023: Montenegro
- 2019–: Eskilstuna Guif
- 2022: Montenegro U-21 (interim)

Zoran Roganović (born 26 December 1977) is a Montenegrin former handball player and current coach of Swedish club Eskilstuna Guif.

== Club career ==
Born in Cetinje, Roganović started out at his hometown club Lovćen. He also played for fellow Yugoslav team Partizan (1998–2000), before going abroad. After spending three seasons in three countries, Roganović moved to Sweden and joined H43 Lund in 2003. He spent 11 years at the club, also having brief loan spells with Aragón, Al Sadd Beirut, Al Qiyadah, El Jaish and Lekhwiya. After playing for fellow Swedish teams Lugi HF and HK Malmö, Roganović returned to H43 Lund for the 2017–18 season.

== International career ==
At international level, Roganović represented Montenegro at the 2008 European Men's Handball Championship and 2013 World Men's Handball Championship.

== Coaching career ==
In August 2018, Roganović was appointed as coach of the Montenegro national team. He coached them at the 2020 European Men's Handball Championship, as they would record their first ever victory at the European Championships.

== Honours ==
Partizan

- Handball Championship of FR Yugoslavia: 1998–99
