= Goran Đukanović =

Montenegrin handball player (born 1976)

Personal information
- Full name: Goran Đukanović
- Nationality: Montenegrin
- Born: 5 November 1976 (age 49) Cetinje, SR Montenegro, SFR Yugoslavia
- Height: 1.90 m (6 ft 3 in)

Sport
- Sport: Handball
- Position: Left back

Youth career
- Years: Team
- –: Lovćen

Senior clubs
- Years: Team
- –: Lovćen
- –: Sutjeska Nikšić
- –: Metaloplastika
- –: Lovćen
- 2003–2004: Al Ahli Doha
- 2004: Trieste
- 2005: Lovćen
- 2005: Zagreb
- 2006: Gold Club
- 2006–2008: Lovćen
- 2008: Budvanska rivijera
- 2009: Budućnost Podgorica
National team
Years	Team		
2000–2006	Serbia and Montenegro		
2006–2008	Montenegro	14	(16)
Medal record
Men's handball
Representing FR Yugoslavia
World Championship
Bronze medal – third place	2001 France	Team

Goran Đukanović (born 5 November 1976) is a Montenegrin former handball player.

== Career ==
Over the course of his career, Đukanović played for his hometown club Lovćen on several occasions, helping them win back-to-back Yugoslav championships in 2000 and 2001. He also played abroad for Al Ahli Doha (Qatar), Trieste (Italy), Zagreb (Croatia) and Gold Club (Slovenia).

At international level, Đukanović represented Serbia and Montenegro (known as FR Yugoslavia until 2003) in five major tournaments, winning the bronze medal at the 2001 World Championship. He also participated in the 2000 Summer Olympics. After the split of Serbia and Montenegro, Đukanović captained Montenegro at the 2008 European Championship.

== Honours ==
Lovćen

- Handball Championship of FR Yugoslavia: 1999–2000, 2000–01
- Handball Cup of FR Yugoslavia: 2001–02, 2002–03
