= Mirko Radović =

Montenegrin handball player (born 1990)

Personal information
- Nationality: Montenegrin
- Born: 15 June 1990 (age 36) Cetinje, SR Montenegro, Yugoslavia
- Height: 1.82 m (6 ft 0 in)

Sport
- Sport: Handball
- Position: Right wing/back
- Current club: RK Lovćen
- Number: 13

Senior clubs
- Years: Team
- –2009: RK Budućnost Podgorica
- 2009–2014: RK Lovćen
- 2014–2017: Valence Handball
- 2017–2018: Ceglédi KKSE
- 2018: RK Lovćen
- 2019–2023: RK Eurofarm Pelister
- 2023–: RK Lovćen
National team
Years	Team	Apps	(Gls)
–	Montenegro	75	(64)

Mirko Radović (born 15 June 1990) is a Montenegrin handball player for RK Lovćen and the Montenegrin national team.

In May 2023, he captained RK Eurofarm Pelister to its seventh Macedonian Super League title and their first after 18 years.
