= Vasko Ševaljević =

Montenegrin handball player (born 1988)

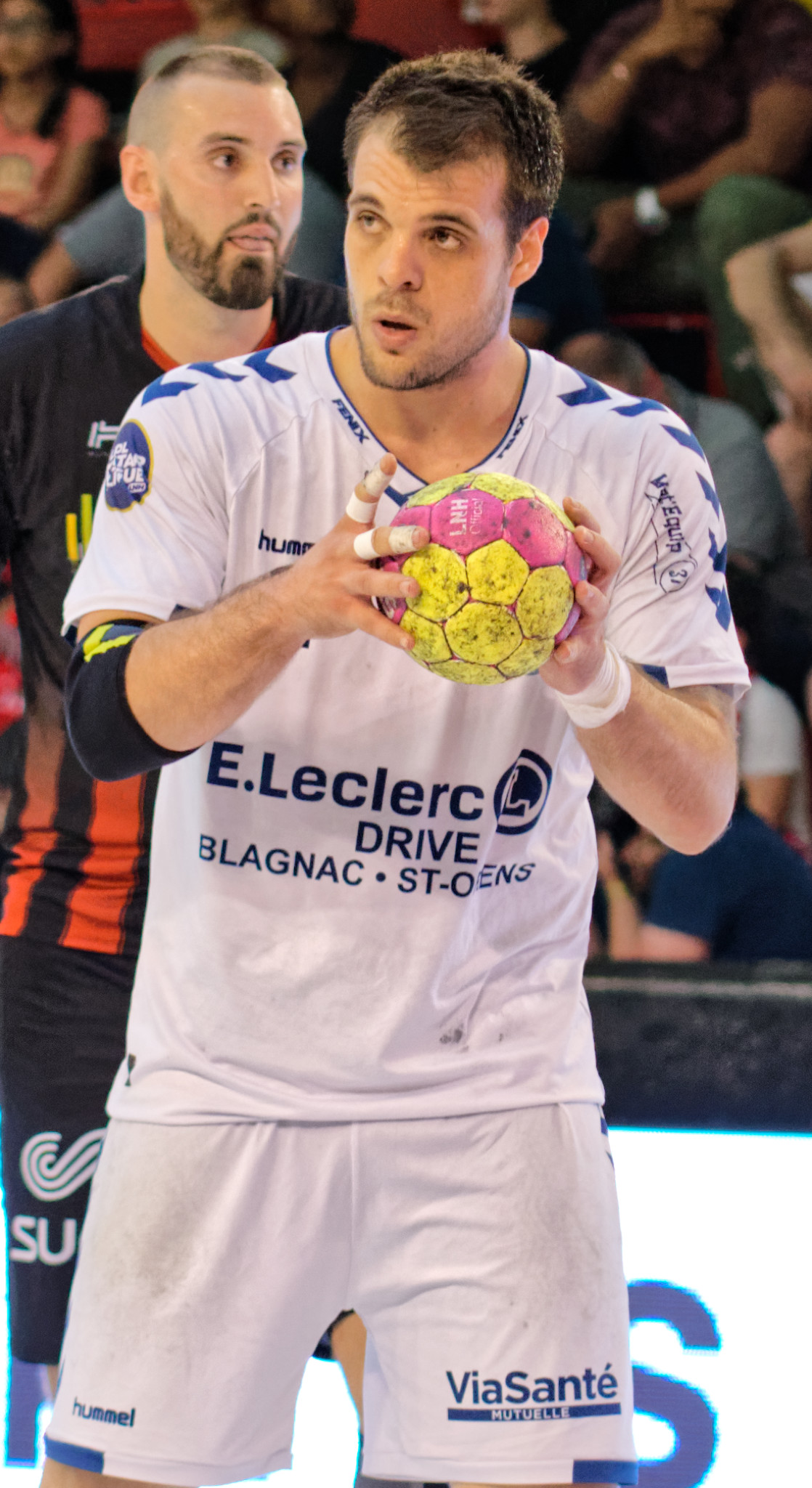

Personal information
- Nationality: Montenegrin
- Born: 21 June 1988 (age 38) Kotor, SR Montenegro, Yugoslavia
- Height: 1.93 m (6 ft 4 in)

Sport
- Sport: Handball
- Position: Left back
- Current club: Amo Handboll
- Number: 2

Senior clubs
- Years: Team
- –2010: RK Lovćen
- 2010–2012: SDC San Antonio
- 2012–2013: HC Dinamo Minsk
- 2013–2015: TSV Hannover-Burgdorf
- 2015–2017: Fenix Toulouse
- 2017–2019: Tremblay-en-France
- 2019–2020: Istres Provence Handball
- 2021: RK Vardar 1961
- 2021–2022: Saran Loiret Handball
- 2022: Hapoel Rishon LeZion
- 2022–2023: Redbergslids IK
- 2023–: Amo Handboll
- 2024: → Al Duhail
National team
Years	Team	Apps	(Gls)
2011–2023	Montenegro	77	(258)

Vasko Ševaljević (born 21 June 1988) is a Montenegrin handball player for Amo Handboll.

At the 2014 European Men's Handball Championship he was the top scorer for Montenegro with 16 goals in three matches.
