= Mladen Rakčević =

Montenegrin handball player (born 1982)

Personal information
- Full name: Mladen Rakčević
- Nationality: Montenegrin
- Born: 10 February 1982 (age 44) Cetinje, Montenegro
- Height: 1.79 m (5 ft 10 in)

Sport
- Sport: Handball
- Position: Pivot

Youth career
- Years: Team
- –: Cepelin

Senior clubs
- Years: Team
- 2000–2005: Lovćen
- 2005–2009: Vardar
- 2009–2010: Kolubara
- 2010–2013: Metalurg Skopje
- 2013–2014: AEK Athens
- 2014–2015: HCM Constanța
- 2015–2018: Dobrogea Sud Constanța
National team
- Years: Team
- 2007–2014: Montenegro

Mladen Rakčević (born 10 February 1982) is a Montenegrin former handball player.

== Career ==
During his career, Rakčević played for Lovćen (2000–2005), Vardar (2005–2009), Kolubara (2009–2010), Metalurg Skopje (2010–2013), AEK Athens (2013–2014), HCM Constanța (2014–2015) and Dobrogea Sud Constanța (2015–2018).

At international level, Rakčević represented Montenegro at the 2013 World Men's Handball Championship. He also participated in two European Championships (2008 and 2014).

== Honours ==
Lovćen

- Handball League of FR Yugoslavia: 2000–01

Vardar

- Macedonian Handball Super League: 2006–07, 2008–09
- Macedonian Handball Cup: 2006–07, 2007–08

Kolubara

- Serbian Handball Super League: 2009–10
- Serbian Handball Cup: 2009–10

Metalurg Skopje

- Macedonian Handball Super League: 2010–11, 2011–12
- Macedonian Handball Cup: 2010–11, 2012–13

AEK Athens

- Greek Men's Handball Cup: 2013–14

Dobrogea Sud Constanța

- Cupa României: 2017–18
