= Montenegro men's national handball team =

Montenegro

Information
- Nickname: Zlatni lavovi (The Golden Lions)
- Association: Handball Federation of Montenegro
- Coach: Zoran Roganović
- Assistant coach: Lazar Simić
- Captain: Mirko Radović
- Most caps: Nemanja Grbović (80)
- Most goals: Vasko Ševaljević (258)

Colours
1st	2nd

Results

World Championship
- Appearances: 2 (First in 2013)
- Best result: 18th (2023)

European Championship
- Appearances: 8 (First in 2008)
- Best result: 11th (2022)
- Last updated on Unknown.

The Montenegro national handball team represents Montenegro in international handball competitions. The national team was formed in 2006 shortly after Montenegro regained independence.

Montenegro played their first official match on 3 January 2007 in Vantaa and beat Finland (28:26). Since then, Montenegro have qualified for nine big competitions – twice for the World Cup (2013 and 2023) and for the European Championship in 2008, 2014, 2016, 2018, 2020, 2022, 2024 and 2026.

== History and records ==
The national side first appeared in the Euro 2008 qualifiers, which started in January 2007. After the great success in the qualifying matches, Montenegro participated at the European Championship 2008, where they finished in the second group phase.
A year later, Montenegro failed to qualify for the World Championship 2009 and after that, there was a crisis in the results of national team.
From 2012, results improved. After a surprise win against Sweden in the qualifiers, Montenegro qualified for the World Championship 2013.
In June 2013, Montenegro eliminated Germany in the final round of qualifiers for the European Championship 2014. At the Championship, Montenegro was eliminated in the first phase.
Two years later, the Montenegrin team appeared at the European Championship 2016, but was eliminated after the first phase of the competition, without any win in three matches. Same result, Montenegro made on European Championship 2018. Finally, on European Championship 2020, Montenegro made historical victory against Serbia (22-21), but failed to qualify to the second round of tournament.

=== Records ===
Largest victory
41:27, Montenegro – Finland, 6 January 2007, Budva

Largest defeat
39:23, Poland – Montenegro, 24 January 2011, Stavanger

Highest home attendance
approx. 6,000, Montenegro – Greece 33:25, 17 April 2022, Podgorica

Highest away attendance
11,835, Denmark – Montenegro 37:26, 13 April 2019, Copenhagen

== Competitive record ==
=== World Championship ===
The national team of Montenegro made their first appearance at the World Cup in 2013, from their 3rd qualifying attempt. Their first World Cup match was played on 12 January 2013 against Argentina in Granollers, Spain.

World Championship						Qualification			
Year	Pos.	Pld	W	D	L	Pld	W	D	L
(Croatia) 2009	did not qualify					2	1	0	1
(Sweden) 2011	did not qualify					2	1	0	1
(Spain) 2013	22nd	7	1	0	6	6	5	0	1
(Qatar) 2015	did not qualify					2	1	0	1
(France) 2017	did not qualify					2	0	0	2
(Denmark) / (Germany) 2019	did not qualify					2	0	1	1
(Egypt) 2021	did not qualify					Cancelled			
(Poland) / (Sweden) 2023	18th	6	2	0	4	2	1	0	1
(Croatia) / (Denmark) / (Norway) 2025	did not qualify					2	0	0	2
(Germany) 2027	did not qualify					4	2	0	2
(France) / (Germany) 2029	TBD					TBD			
(Denmark) / (Iceland) / (Norway) 2031	TBD					TBD			
Total		13	3	0	10	20	13	1	12

=== European Championship ===
Debut on the European Championship, Montenegrin national team made after first attempt.
They participated at the Euro 2008 and made successful appearance in their first match against Russia (25:25). They qualified for the Main Phase of the European Championship.
Their second appearance was in 2014, after Montenegro sensational eliminated Germany during the qualifiers. At the tournament, Montenegro lost all three games, with elimination after the first phase.
Montenegro hoped for a better result in 2016, but it was pretty much deja vu from two years ago as they once again lost all three games and finished in last place in their group, as well as last place in the tournament claiming 16th place out of 16 teams.

European Championship								Qualification			
Year	Pos.	Pld	W	D	L	GS	GA	Pld	W	D	L
(Norway) 2008	12th	6	0	1	5	149	188	8	7	1	0
(Austria) 2010	did not qualify							8	4	0	4
(Serbia) 2012	did not qualify							6	1	0	5
(Denmark) 2014	16th	3	0	0	3	66	84	6	4	0	2
(Poland) 2016	16th	3	0	0	3	76	90	6	3	1	2
(Croatia) 2018	16th	3	0	0	3	66	89	6	2	3	1
(Austria) / (Norway) / (Sweden) 2020	18th	3	1	0	2	70	84	6	3	1	2
(Hungary) / (Slovakia) 2022	11th	7	3	0	4	195	216	6	3	0	3
(Germany) 2024	14th	3	1	0	2	84	86	6	3	0	3
(Denmark) / (Norway) / (Sweden) 2026	23rd	3	0	0	3	90	121	6	4	1	1
(Portugal) / (Spain) / (Switzerland) 2028	To be determined							TBD			
(Czech Republic) (Denmark) (Poland) 2030	To be determined							TBD			
(France) (Germany) 2032	To be determined							TBD			
Total	8/13	31	5	1	25	796	958	64	34	7	23

== Team ==
=== Current squad ===
Squad for the 2026 European Men's Handball Championship.

Head coach: (France) Didier Dinart

No.	Pos.	Name	Date of birth (age)	Height	App.	Goals	Club
2	LW	Filip Vujović	7 April 1996 (age 30)	1.88 m	14	11	(Montenegro) RK Sutjeska Nikšić
6	LW	Miloš Vujović	5 September 1993 (age 33)	1.81 m	71	195	(Germany) VfL Gummersbach
7	RB	Stefan Čavor	3 November 1994 (age 32)	1.97 m	47	78	(Germany) HSG Wetzlar
9	CB	Radojica Čepić	29 July 2002 (age 24)	1.94 m	31	82	(Switzerland) HC Kriens-Luzern
10	P	Miodrag Ćorsović	22 February 2000 (age 26)	1.98 m	13	27	(France) Dijon Métropole Handball
11	RB	Branko Vujović	20 April 1998 (age 28)	1.96 m	29	143	(Romania) Dinamo București
12	GK	Haris Suljević	26 February 2001 (age 25)	1.94 m	6	0	(Croatia) RK Zagreb
13	RW	Mirko Radović	15 June 1990 (age 36)	1.85 m	66	39	(Montenegro) RK Lovćen
17	LB	Vasilije Kaluđerović	3 October 1998 (age 28)	1.91 m	28	31	(Kuwait) Al-Qurain SC
20	LB	Stevan Vujović	7 April 1990 (age 36)	1.90 m	55	47	(Kuwait) Al-Nassr
22	P	Luka Vujović	11 April 2000 (age 26)	1.93 m	8	9	(Romania) CSM Sighişoara
24	LB	Miloš Božović	10 December 1994 (age 31)	1.99 m	44	67	(Hungary) Győri ETO-UNI FKC
26	RB	Risto Vujačić	4 December 1993 (age 32)	1.90 m	31	42	(Romania) SCM Politehnica Timișoara
36	P	Admir Pelidija	26 August 1994 (age 32)	1.93 m	13	7	(Poland) Corotop Gwardia Opole
37	LB	Milorad Bakić	9 February 2005 (age 21)	2.01 m	3	0	(Sweden) Eskilstuna Guif
77	RW	Luka Radović	29 December 1997 (age 28)	1.80 m	15	37	(France) Saran Loiret Handball
85	GK	Mile Mijušković	8 October 1985 (age 41)	1.92 m	30	5	(Spain) OAR Coruña
87	LB	Vuko Borozan	9 April 1994 (age 32)	2.02 m	28	52	(North Macedonia) RK Vardar 1961

=== Coaching staff ===
Role	Name
Head coach	(France) Didier Dinart
Assistant coach	(Montenegro) Vasko Ševaljević
Assistant coach	(Montenegro) Goran Musić
Team manager	(Montenegro) Petar Kapisoda
Strength coach	(Sweden) Anton Claesson
Team official	(Montenegro) Maksim Šćekić
Physiotherapist	(Montenegro) Andrija Damjanović
Physiotherapist	(Montenegro) Hamza Mehović

=== Head coaches ===
Since independence, Montenegro was led by eight different coaches. Most matches as a Montenegro coach has Zoran Roganović (34).

Coach	From	To	Record*					Championship
Coach	From	To	M	W	D	L	Win %	Championship
(Montenegro) Pero Milošević	October 2006	June 2007	8	7	1	0	87.50	
(Montenegro) Ranko Popović	August 2007	November 2009	16	5	1	10	31.25	EC 2008
(Bosnia and Herzegovina) Kasim Kamenica	November 2009	April 2010	2	1	0	1	50.00	
(Montenegro) Miodrag Popović	April 2010	March 2011	4	1	0	3	25.00	
(Montenegro) Zoran Kastratović	May 2011	February 2014	24	10	0	14	41.67	WC 2013, EC 2014
(Serbia) Ljubomir Obradović	March 2014	November 2016	13	4	1	8	30.77	EC 2016
(Serbia) Dragan Đukić	November 2016	July 2018	11	3	3	5	27.27	EC 2018
(Montenegro) Zoran Roganović	August 2018	January 2023	34	12	1	21	35.29	EC 2020, EC 2022, WC 2023
(Croatia) Vlado Šola	February 2023	May 2024	7	2	0	5	28.57	EC 2024

* Data is only for official matches (qualifiers, European Championship, World Championship).

=== Notable former players ===
- Petar Kapisoda
- Draško Mrvaljević
- Zoran Roganović
- Goran Đukanović
- Alen Muratović
- Novica Rudović
- Goran Stojanović
- Vladimir Osmajić
- Ratko Đurković
- Fahrudin Melić
- Blažo Lisičić
- Marko Dobrković
- Žarko Pejović
- Mladen Rakčević
- Igor Marković
- Aleksandar Svitlica
- Nemanja Grbović

== See also ==
- List of official matches of the Montenegro handball team
- Handball Federation of Montenegro
- Montenegro women's national handball team
