= Israel men's national handball team =

Israel

Information
- Association: Israel Handball Association
- Coach: David Pisonero
- Assistant coach: Chen Pomeranz
- Captain: Daniel Shkalim
- Most caps: Idan Maimon (168)
- Most goals: Idan Maimon (636)

Colours
| 1st | 2nd |

Results

European Championship
- Appearances: 1 (First in 2002)
- Best result: 14th (2002)
- Last updated on Unknown.

The Israel national handball team is controlled by the Israel Handball Association, and represents Israel in international matches.

== Competitive record ==
=== European Championship ===
European Championship record
| Year | Round | Position | GP | W | D | L | GS | GA |
|---|---|---|---|---|---|---|---|---|
| (Portugal) 1994 | Did not qualify | | | | | | | |
| (Spain) 1996 | Did not qualify | | | | | | | |
| (Italy) 1998 | Did not qualify | | | | | | | |
| (Croatia) 2000 | Did not qualify | | | | | | | |
| (Sweden) 2002 | Preliminary round | 14 | 3 | 0 | 0 | 3 | 67 | 82 |
| (Slovenia) 2004 | Did not qualify | | | | | | | |
| (Switzerland) 2006 | Did not qualify | | | | | | | |
| (Norway) 2008 | Did not qualify | | | | | | | |
| (Austria) 2010 | Did not qualify | | | | | | | |
| (Serbia) 2012 | Did not qualify | | | | | | | |
| (Denmark) 2014 | Did not qualify | | | | | | | |
| (Poland) 2016 | Did not qualify | | | | | | | |
| (Croatia) 2018 | Did not qualify | | | | | | | |
| (Austria) (Norway) (Sweden) 2020 | Did not qualify | | | | | | | |
| (Hungary) (Slovakia) 2022 | Did not qualify | | | | | | | |
| (Germany) 2024 | Did not qualify | | | | | | | |
| (Denmark) (Norway) (Sweden) 2026 | Did not qualify | | | | | | | |
| (Portugal) (Spain) (Switzerland) 2028 | To be determined | | | | | | | |
| (Czech Republic) (Denmark) (Poland) 2030 | To be determined | | | | | | | |
| (France) (Germany) 2032 | To be determined | | | | | | | |
| Total | 1/20 | – | 3 | 0 | 0 | 3 | 67 | 82 |

== Best achievement ==
The team's biggest achievement was a performance in the European Handball Championship that was held in Sweden in 2002, where it didn't manage to go through the first group stage. In the qualifying playoff games the Israel beat the Republic of Macedonia . Israel's coach in the Championship was Shlomo Hoffman, and its leading players were Idan Maimon, Vladimir Zaikman, Leonid Durashenko, Dudi Balsar and Dovi Yeshua. Ever since the historic participation at the 2002 championship, the team hasn't managed to pass the preliminary round of qualifications.

== Previous campaigns ==
=== World 2007 qualifiers ===
In the winter of 2006 the team had failed to qualify to the 2007 world championship after finishing third at the qualifications – behind Austria and Finland.

=== Euro 2008 qualifiers ===
In the winter of 2007 Israel again failed to qualify, this time to the 2008 European Championships. Despite an impressive home win 30:29 against the very strong team of Serbia, Israel lost twice to Macedonia, and finished again finished third, behind Serbia and Republic of Macedonia and ahead of Luxembourg.

| Date | Opponent | H/A | Venue | Spectators | Result | H.T | Top scorer |
|---|---|---|---|---|---|---|---|
| 4 January 2007 | Serbia | Away | Belgrad | 2,000 | Lost – 37:27 | 16:11 | Tom Matalon, Avishay Smoler (6) |
| 6 January 2007 | Serbia | Home | Raanana | 2,000 | Win – 30:29 | 16:12 | Gal Avraham (7) |
| 10 January 2007 | Macedonia | Home | Raanana | 2,000 | Lost – 28:30 | 15:19 | Idan Maimon (7) |
| 13 January 2007 | Macedonia | Away | Scopia | 1,500 | Lost – 27:26 | 12:10 | Gal Avraham, Avishay Smoler (5) |
| 17 January 2007 | Luxembourg | Away | Luxembourg | 500 | Win – 25:26 | 11:13 | Idan Maimon |
| 21 January 2007 | Luxembourg | Home | Raanana | 500 | Win – 35:26 | 17:10 | Idan Maimon (9) |

=== World 2009 qualifiers ===
In the following winter Israel met Serbian again, at the 2009 World Championships Qualifying. This time it lost both games to Serbia, and finished second (out of three) after beating The Faroe Islands at both games.

| Date | Opponent | H/A | Venue | Spectators | Result | H.T | Top scorer |
|---|---|---|---|---|---|---|---|
| 9 January 2008 | Faroe Islands | Away | Torshaven | 800 | Win – 21:26 | 8:15 | Avishay Smoler (6) |
| 12 January 2008 | Faroe Islands | Home | Raanana | 1,000 | Win – 31:21 | 17:11 | Gal Avraham (6) |
| 16 January 2008 | Serbia | Home | Raanana | 1,600 | Lost – 31:34 | 15:17 | Avishay Smoler (10) |
| 19 January 2008 | Serbia | Away | Belgrad | 2,000 | Lost – 44:36 | 20:15 | Avishay Smoler, Chen Pomeranz (10) |

=== Euro 2010 qualifiers ===
In the 2010 European Championships qualifying, held in 2008 and 2009, Israel was drawn into group 5, together with the world champions, Germany, Slovenia, Belarus and Bulgaria.

Israel lost both games to Slovenia, Belarus and Germany, and only won both games against Bulgaria.

The team's captain was Idan Maimon, and its leading players were Avishay Smoler of German team TBV Lemgo, Chen Pomerantz, Tom Matalon, Gal Avraham and goalkeeper Leonid Durashenko.

| Date | Opponent | H/A | Venue | Spectators | Result | H.T | Top scorer |
|---|---|---|---|---|---|---|---|
| 29 October 2008 | Slovenia | Home | Rishon LeZion | 800 | Lost – 28:36 | 16:21 | Avishay Smoler (10) |
| 2 November 2008 | Bulgaria | Away | Blagoevgrad | 400 | Won – 28:34 | 15–20 | Avishay Smoler (9) |
| 26 November 2008 | Belarus | Away | Berst | 3,700 | Lost – 38:31 | 21:14 | Gal Avraham (7) |
| 29 November 2008 | Belarus | Home | Rishon LeZion | 1,000 | Lost – 28:31 | 11:19 | Tom Matalon (6) |
| 18 March 2009 | Bulgaria | Home | Kiryat Motzkin | 900 | Won – 29:20 | 16:10 | Chen Pomernz (6), Avishay Smoler (6) |
| 22 March 2009 | Germany | Away | Ashafenburg | 4,500 | Lost – 24:36 | 15:17 | Gal Avraham (12) |
| 17 June 2009 | Slovenia | Away | Ljubljana | 3,000 | Lost – 27:40 | 17:20 | Chen Pomeranz (6) |
| 21 June 2009 | Germany | Home | Rishon LeZion | 1,000 | Lost – 40:21 | 17:12 | Chen Pomeranz (6) |

| Pos | Team | Pld | W | D | L | GF | GA | GD | Pts | Qualification | GER | SLO | BLR | ISR | BUL |
|---|---|---|---|---|---|---|---|---|---|---|---|---|---|---|---|
| 1 | Germany | 8 | 8 | 0 | 0 | 300 | 191 | +109 | 16 | Final tournament | — | 38–30 | 38–27 | 36–24 | 42–11 |
| 2 | Slovenia | 8 | 6 | 0 | 2 | 293 | 221 | +72 | 12 | Final tournament | 26–27 | — | 38–26 | 40–27 | 47–20 |
| 3 | Belarus | 8 | 4 | 0 | 4 | 253 | 233 | +20 | 8 | | 23–25 | 32–36 | — | 38–31 | 36–18 |
| 4 | Israel | 8 | 2 | 0 | 6 | 222 | 269 | −47 | 4 | | 21–40 | 28–36 | 28–31 | — | 29–20 |
| 5 | Bulgaria | 8 | 0 | 0 | 8 | 168 | 322 | −154 | 0 | | 29–54 | 23–40 | 19–40 | 28–34 | — |

== Team ==
=== Current squad ===
Squad for the 2021 World Men's Handball Championship – European Qualification.

Head coach: Oleg Boutenko

| No. | Pos. | Name | Date of birth (age) | Height | App. | Goals | Club |
|---|---|---|---|---|---|---|---|
| 1 | GK | Moshe Elimelech | 15 January 1992 (age 34) | 1.83 m | 13 | 0 | (Israel) Irony Rehovot |
| 2 | P | Snir Natsia | 26 August 1999 (age 26) | 2.00 m | 9 | 5 | (Israel) Maccabi Rishon LeZion |
| 3 | P | Daniel Shkalim | 17 September 1992 (age 33) | 1.86 m | 47 | 54 | (Israel) Ramat Hasharon HC |
| 7 | RW | Amit Gal | 11 August 1992 (age 33) | 1.79 m | 37 | 39 | (Israel) Ramat Hasharon HC |
| 11 | LB | Niv Levy | 8 June 1993 (age 32) | 1.86 m | 53 | 110 | (Israel) Hapoel Ashdod |
| 14 | GK | Dan Tepper | 4 March 1994 (age 32) | 1.88 m | 29 | 0 | (France) JS Cherbourg |
| 18 | RW | Tal Hershkowitz | 12 August 1992 (age 33) | 1.85 m | 47 | 88 | (Israel) Hapoel Ashdod |
| 21 | CB | Eden Gingihashvili | 18 August 1996 (age 29) | 1.83 m | 3 | 4 | (Israel) HC Holon |
| 22 | LB | Ram Turkenitz | 26 September 1995 (age 30) | 1.90 m | 37 | 61 | (Sweden) HK Varberg |
| 23 | CB | Yonatan Dayan | 6 January 2000 (age 26) | 1.85 m | 0 | 0 | (Germany) VfL Gummersbach |
| 24 | RW | Amit Stelman | 9 January 1993 (age 33) | 1.79 m | 59 | 127 | (Israel) Maccabi Rishon LeZion |
| 29 | P | Yossi Appo | 1 October 1993 (age 32) | 1.90 m | 28 | 26 | (Israel) Ramat Hasharon HC |
| 39 | LB | Adir Cohen | 27 October 1998 (age 27) | 1.95 m | 16 | 35 | (Switzerland) Pfadi Winterthur |
| 53 | LW | oz Hamami | 10 May 1992 (age 33) | 1.80 m | 29 | 50 | (Israel) Hapoel Rishon LeZion |
| 66 | CB | Yoav Lumbroso | 15 July 2000 (age 25) | 1.72 m | 1 | 3 | (Germany) ThSV Eisenach |
| 83 | LW | Gil Pomeranz | 17 November 1991 (age 34) | 1.82 m | 54 | 133 | (Israel) Ramat Hasharon HC |

== Former coaches ==
- (Romania) Eugen Trofin (−1983)
- Israel Brener (1982–1983)
- (Israel) Moshe Lagil (1983–1984)
- (Israel) Shlomo Hoffman (1992–2008)
- (Israel) Gilad Maor (2008–2012)
- (Serbia) Dragan Đukić (2012–2015)
- (Sweden) Per Carlén (2015–2016)
- (Israel) Oleg Boutenko (2016–2022)
- (Serbia) Dragan Đukić (2022–2023)
- (Israel) Saar Frankel (2023–2024)
- (Spain) David Pisonero (2024–)
