= Greece men's national handball team =

Greece

Information
- Association: Hellenic Handball Federation
- Coach: Georgios Zaravinas
- Assistant coach: Georgios Mastorogiannis
- Most caps: Georgios Chalkidis (240)
- Most goals: Savvas Karypidis (930)

Colours
1st	2nd

Results

Summer Olympics
- Appearances: 1 (First in 2004)
- Best result: 6th (2004)

World Championship
- Appearances: 2 (First in 2005)
- Best result: 6th (2005)

European Championship
- Appearances: 1 (First in 2024)
- Best result: 23rd (2024)
- Last updated on Unknown.

The Greece national handball team is the national handball team of Greece and is controlled by the Hellenic Handball Federation.

Greece has a long tradition in handball. First of all, Greece made it to the handball 2005 World Cup and the 2004 Olympics where they beat Brazil, Korea and won against Egypt in a close game. In the Olympics they lost to eventual champions Croatia, and finished sixth in the tournament. In the World Cup they finished in the sixth position as well. Greece took part in the EHF Euro for the first time in 2024.

== Competitive record ==
=== Olympic Games ===
Olympic record
Games	Round	Position	Pld	W	D	L	GF	GA
(Germany) 1936 Berlin	did not qualify							
Not held from 1948 to 1968
(West Germany) 1972 Munich	did not qualify							
(Canada) 1976 Montreal	did not qualify							
(Soviet Union) 1980 Moscow	did not qualify							
(United States) 1984 Los Angeles	did not qualify							
(South Korea) 1988 Seoul	did not qualify							
(Spain) 1992 Barcelona	did not qualify							
(United States) 1996 Atlanta	did not qualify							
(Australia) 2000 Sydney	did not qualify							
(Greece) 2004 Athens	Quarter-finals	6th place	8	3	0	5	188	220
(China) 2008 Beijing	did not qualify							
(United Kingdom) 2012 London	did not qualify							
(Brazil) 2016 Rio de Janeiro	did not qualify							
(Japan) 2020 Tokyo	did not qualify							
(France) 2024 Paris	did not qualify							
Total	1/14	–	8	3	0	5	188	220

=== World Championships ===
World Championship record
Year	Round	Position	GP	W	D	L	GS	GA
(Nazi Germany) 1938	did not qualify							
(Sweden) 1954	did not qualify							
(East Germany) 1958	did not qualify							
(West Germany) 1961	did not qualify							
(Czechoslovakia) 1964	did not qualify							
(Sweden) 1967	did not qualify							
(France) 1970	did not qualify							
(East Germany) 1974	did not qualify							
(Denmark) 1978	did not qualify							
(West Germany) 1982	did not qualify							
(Switzerland) 1986	did not qualify							
(Czechoslovakia) 1990	did not qualify							
(Sweden) 1993	did not qualify							
(Iceland) 1995	did not qualify							
(Japan) 1997	did not qualify							
(Egypt) 1999	did not qualify							
(France) 2001	did not qualify							
(Portugal) 2003	did not qualify							
(Tunisia) 2005	Quarter-finals	6th place	9	4	1	4	245	246
(Germany) 2007	did not qualify							
(Croatia) 2009	did not qualify							
(Sweden) 2011	did not qualify							
(Spain) 2013	did not qualify							
(Qatar) 2015	did not qualify							
(France) 2017	did not qualify							
(Denmark) / (Germany) 2019	did not qualify							
(Egypt) 2021	did not qualify							
(Poland) / (Sweden) 2023	did not qualify							
(Croatia) / (Denmark) / (Norway) 2025	did not qualify							
(Germany) 2027	qualified							
(France) / (Germany) 2029	to be determined							
(Denmark) / (Iceland) / (Norway) 2031	to be determined							
Total	2/32	–	9	4	1	4	245	246

=== European Championships ===
European Championship record
Year	Round	Position	GP	W	D	L	GS	GA
(Portugal) 1994	did not qualify							
(Spain) 1996	did not qualify							
(Italy) 1998	did not qualify							
(Croatia) 2000	did not qualify							
(Sweden) 2002	did not qualify							
(Slovenia) 2004	did not qualify							
(Switzerland) 2006	did not qualify							
(Norway) 2008	did not qualify							
(Austria) 2010	did not qualify							
(Serbia) 2012	did not qualify							
(Denmark) 2014	did not qualify							
(Poland) 2016	did not qualify							
(Croatia) 2018	did not qualify							
(Austria) (Norway) (Sweden) 2020	did not qualify							
(Hungary) (Slovakia) 2022	did not qualify							
(Germany) 2024	Preliminary round	23rd	3	0	0	3	72	100
(Denmark) (Norway) (Sweden) 2026	did not qualify							
(Portugal) (Spain) (Switzerland) 2028	to be determined							
(Czech Republic) (Denmark) (Poland) 2030	to be determined							
(France) (Germany) 2032	to be determined							
Total	1/20		3	0	0	3	72	100

== Current squad ==
The squad for the 2024 European Men's Handball Championship.

Head coach: Georgios Zaravinas

No.	Pos.	Name	Date of birth (age)	Height	App.	Goals	Club
5	CB	Dimitrios Panagiotou	21 May 2004 (age 21)	1.82 m	12	18	(Greece) Doukas School
6	LB	Theodoros Boskos	7 April 2001 (age 25)	1.90 m	24	62	(Spain) BM Puente Genil
8	P	Nikolaos Liapis	24 August 1999 (age 26)	1.93 m	33	66	(Greece) AEK Athens
11	CB	Charalampos Mallios	6 August 1987 (age 38)	1.84 m	74	214	(Greece) AEK Athens
12	GK	Eleftherios Papazoglou	3 July 1997 (age 28)	1.92 m	2	0	(Greece) AC PAOK
13	P	Stefanos Michailidis	15 May 1994 (age 32)	2.00 m	31	24	(Greece) Olympiacos
14	LB	Nikolaos Passias	17 February 1995 (age 31)	1.92 m	56	73	(Greece) Olympiacos
15	RB	Achilleas Toskas	1 October 2004 (age 21)	1.91 m	16	52	(Greece) Bianco Monte Drama
16	GK	Petros Boukovinas	8 March 1994 (age 32)	1.88 m	66	14	(Germany) TV Großwallstadt
18	LW	Georgios Papavasilis	31 July 2000 (age 25)	1.82 m	27	26	(Greece) Olympiacos
19	P	Panagiotis Karampourniotis	20 February 1998 (age 28)	1.96 m	28	25	(Greece) Olympiacos
20	RB	Athanasios Papazoglou	28 January 2002 (age 24)	1.92 m	11	13	(Greece) AC PAOK
21	RW	Dimitrios Tziras	5 April 1991 (age 35)	1.90 m	85	307	(Greece) Olympiacos
24	CB	Petros Kandylas	28 February 1991 (age 35)	1.97 m	63	52	(Greece) Olympiacos
28	P	Anastasios Papadionysiou	11 August 1990 (age 35)	1.90 m	85	129	(Greece) AEK Athens
38	RW	Evangelos Arampatzis	4 August 1996 (age 29)	1.84 m	47	86	(Greece) AEK Athens
40	GK	Panagiotis Papantonopoulos	2 October 2001 (age 24)	1.90 m	23	0	(Greece) Olympiacos
77	LB	Savvas Savvas	7 July 1997 (age 28)	1.92 m	12	41	(Greece) Olympiacos
99	LW	Christos Kederis	29 April 1994 (age 32)	1.69 m	22	38	(Greece) AEK Athens
