= Bulgaria men's national handball team =

Men's national handball team

Bulgaria

Information
- Association: Bulgarian Handball Federation
- Coach: Nikola Karastoyanov

Colours
1st	2nd

Results

World Championship
- Appearances: 2 (First in 1974)
- Best result: 10th (1974)
- Last updated on Unknown.

The Bulgaria national handball team is the national team of Bulgaria. It takes part in international handball competitions.

The team participated at the 1974 and 1978 World Men's Handball Championships.

== Record ==
=== World Championships ===
World Championship record
Year	Round	Position	GP	W	D	L	GS	GA
(Nazi Germany) 1938	Did not qualify							
(Sweden) 1954	Did not qualify							
(East Germany) 1958	Did not qualify							
(West Germany) 1961	Did not qualify							
(Czechoslovakia) 1964	Did not qualify							
(Sweden) 1967	Did not qualify							
(France) 1970	Did not qualify							
(East Germany) 1974	Preliminary round	10	3	1	0	2	55	60
(Denmark) 1978	Preliminary round	14	3	0	0	3	58	62
(West Germany) 1982	Did not qualify							
(Switzerland) 1986	Did not qualify							
(Czechoslovakia) 1990	Did not qualify							
(Sweden) 1993	Did not qualify							
(Iceland) 1995	Did not qualify							
(Japan) 1997	Did not qualify							
(Egypt) 1999	Did not qualify							
(France) 2001	Did not qualify							
(Portugal) 2003	Did not qualify							
(Tunisia) 2005	Did not qualify							
(Germany) 2007	Did not qualify							
(Croatia) 2009	Did not qualify							
(Sweden) 2011	Did not qualify							
(Spain) 2013	Did not qualify							
(Qatar) 2015	Did not qualify							
(France) 2017	Did not qualify							
(Denmark) / (Germany) 2019	Did not qualify							
(Egypt) 2021	Did not qualify							
(Poland) / (Sweden) 2023	Did not qualify							
(Croatia) / (Denmark) / (Norway) 2025	TBD							
(Germany) 2027	TBD							
(France) / (Germany) 2029	TBD							
(Denmark) / (Iceland) / (Norway) 2031	TBD							
Total	2/32	–	6	1	0	5	113	122

=== European Championships ===
European Championship record
Year	Round	Position	GP	W	D	L	GS	GA
(Portugal) 1994	Did not qualify							
(Spain) 1996	Did not qualify							
(Italy) 1998	Did not qualify							
(Croatia) 2000	Did not qualify							
(Sweden) 2002	Did not qualify							
(Slovenia) 2004	Did not qualify							
(Switzerland) 2006	Did not qualify							
(Norway) 2008	Did not qualify							
(Austria) 2010	Did not qualify							
(Serbia) 2012	Did not qualify							
(Denmark) 2014	Did not qualify							
(Poland) 2016	Did not qualify							
(Croatia) 2018	Did not qualify							
(Austria) / (Norway) / (Sweden) 2020	Did not qualify							
(Hungary) / (Slovakia) 2022	Did not qualify							
(Germany) 2024	Did not qualify							
(Denmark) / (Norway) / (Sweden) 2026	Did not qualify							
(Portugal) / (Spain) (Switzerland) 2028	Did not qualify							
Total	0/18	–	–	–	–	–	–	–

=== IHF Emerging Nations Championship ===
- 2015 – 11th place
- 2017 – 5th place
- 2019 – 3rd place
- 2023 – 3rd place
- 2025 – 2nd place
