= 2013 World Men's Handball Championship – European qualification =

The European qualification for the 2013 World Men's Handball Championship, in Spain, was played over two rounds. The 2013 hosts Spain, the 2011 holders France and the 3 best teams from the 2012 European Men's Handball Championship, Denmark, Serbia and Croatia were qualified automatically for the World Championship. In the first round of qualification, 21 teams who were not participating at the European Championship were split into seven groups. The group winners and the remaining 11 teams from the European Championship played a playoff afterwards to determine the other nine qualifiers.

== Group stage ==
The draw was held on July 3, 2011 at 12:00 at Brno, Czech Republic.

=== Group 1 ===
| Pos | Team | Pld | W | D | L | GF | GA | GD | Pts | Qualification |
|---|---|---|---|---|---|---|---|---|---|---|
| 1 | Austria | 4 | 4 | 0 | 0 | 148 | 99 | +49 | 8 | Playoffs |
| 2 | Israel | 4 | 2 | 0 | 2 | 111 | 117 | −6 | 4 | |
| 3 | Great Britain | 4 | 0 | 0 | 4 | 92 | 135 | −43 | 0 | |

| 2 November 2011; 19:00 | Great Britain | 26 – 29 | Israel | Crystal Palace National Sports Centre, London; Attendance: 400; Referees: Mata, Lopez (ESP) |
| 2 November 2011; 19:00 | Larsson 9 | (14–16) | Pomeranz 7 | Crystal Palace National Sports Centre, London; Attendance: 400; Referees: Mata, Lopez (ESP) |
| 2 November 2011; 19:00 | 2× (yellow card) 5× (suspension) | Report | 3× (yellow card) 6× (suspension) | Crystal Palace National Sports Centre, London; Attendance: 400; Referees: Mata, Lopez (ESP) |

| 6 November 2011; 19:00 | Israel | 29 – 20 | Great Britain | Maccabi handball House, Tel Aviv; Attendance: 750; Referees: Chaskis, Tsakonas (GRE) |
| 6 November 2011; 19:00 | Tal 6 | (13–13) | Garnham 5 | Maccabi handball House, Tel Aviv; Attendance: 750; Referees: Chaskis, Tsakonas (GRE) |
| 6 November 2011; 19:00 | 3× (yellow card) 3× (suspension) | Report | 3× (yellow card) 5× (suspension) | Maccabi handball House, Tel Aviv; Attendance: 750; Referees: Chaskis, Tsakonas (GRE) |

| 5 January 2012; 20:20 | Austria | 37 – 22 | Great Britain | Sporthalle Tulln, Tulln; Attendance: 1,000; Referees: Stenrand, Birch (DEN) |
| 5 January 2012; 20:20 | Santos 12 | (19–8) | Larsson 6 | Sporthalle Tulln, Tulln; Attendance: 1,000; Referees: Stenrand, Birch (DEN) |
| 5 January 2012; 20:20 | 3× (yellow card) 3× (suspension) | Report | 3× (yellow card) 2× (suspension) | Sporthalle Tulln, Tulln; Attendance: 1,000; Referees: Stenrand, Birch (DEN) |

| 8 January 2012; 14:00 | Great Britain | 24 – 40 | Austria | Crystal Palace National Sports Centre, London; Attendance: 550; Referees: Kouz, Zhoba (UKR) |
| 8 January 2012; 14:00 | Hare 6 | (13–17) | Weber 12 | Crystal Palace National Sports Centre, London; Attendance: 550; Referees: Kouz, Zhoba (UKR) |
| 8 January 2012; 14:00 | 3× (yellow card) 5× (suspension) | Report | 2× (yellow card) 4× (suspension) 1× (red card) | Crystal Palace National Sports Centre, London; Attendance: 550; Referees: Kouz, Zhoba (UKR) |

| 11 January 2012; 19:15 | Israel | 31 – 40 | Austria | Maccabi handball House, Tel Aviv; Attendance: 800; Referees: Malasinskas, Grigalionis (LTU) |
| 11 January 2012; 19:15 | Neeman 6 | (17–19) | Santos, Szilagyi 8 | Maccabi handball House, Tel Aviv; Attendance: 800; Referees: Malasinskas, Grigalionis (LTU) |
| 11 January 2012; 19:15 | 3× (yellow card) 4× (suspension) | Report | 3× (yellow card) 7× (suspension) | Maccabi handball House, Tel Aviv; Attendance: 800; Referees: Malasinskas, Grigalionis (LTU) |

| 14 January 2012; 20:20 | Austria | 31 – 22 | Israel | BSFZ Südstadt, Maria Enzersdorf; Attendance: 1,500; Referees: Stark, Stefan (ROU) |
| 14 January 2012; 20:20 | Weber 8 | (13–9) | Halifi 8 | BSFZ Südstadt, Maria Enzersdorf; Attendance: 1,500; Referees: Stark, Stefan (ROU) |
| 14 January 2012; 20:20 | 3× (yellow card) 2× (suspension) | Report | 2× (yellow card) 5× (suspension) | BSFZ Südstadt, Maria Enzersdorf; Attendance: 1,500; Referees: Stark, Stefan (ROU) |

=== Group 2 ===
| Pos | Team | Pld | W | D | L | GF | GA | GD | Pts | Qualification |
|---|---|---|---|---|---|---|---|---|---|---|
| 1 | Portugal | 4 | 4 | 0 | 0 | 121 | 95 | +26 | 8 | Playoffs |
| 2 | Ukraine | 4 | 2 | 0 | 2 | 110 | 92 | +18 | 4 | |
| 3 | Turkey | 4 | 0 | 0 | 4 | 92 | 127 | −35 | 0 | |

| 2 November 2011; 19:00 | Turkey | 24 – 26 | Ukraine | Mersin; Attendance: 700; Referees: Buache, Meyer (SUI) |
| 2 November 2011; 19:00 | Döne 12 | (11–13) | Burka 7 | Mersin; Attendance: 700; Referees: Buache, Meyer (SUI) |
| 2 November 2011; 19:00 | 3× (yellow card) 3× (suspension) | Report | 2× (yellow card) 5× (suspension) | Mersin; Attendance: 700; Referees: Buache, Meyer (SUI) |

| 6 November 2011; 17:00 | Ukraine | 32 – 20 | Turkey | Palace of Sports Yunost, Zaporozhye; Attendance: 1,100; Referees: Sivak, Dvorsky (SVK) |
| 6 November 2011; 17:00 | Onufryienko 6 | (16–7) | Döne 6 | Palace of Sports Yunost, Zaporozhye; Attendance: 1,100; Referees: Sivak, Dvorsky (SVK) |
| 6 November 2011; 17:00 | 3× (yellow card) 9× (suspension) | Report | 3× (yellow card) 9× (suspension) 1× (red card) | Palace of Sports Yunost, Zaporozhye; Attendance: 1,100; Referees: Sivak, Dvorsky (SVK) |

| 4 January 2012; 20:15 | Portugal | 35 – 22 | Turkey | Lamego; Attendance: 2,000; Referees: Pandžić, Mosorinski (SRB) |
| 4 January 2012; 20:15 | Ramos Magalhaes, Tavares 6 | (16–14) | Döne 9 | Lamego; Attendance: 2,000; Referees: Pandžić, Mosorinski (SRB) |
| 4 January 2012; 20:15 | 3× (yellow card) 2× (suspension) | Report | 3× (yellow card) 1× (suspension) | Lamego; Attendance: 2,000; Referees: Pandžić, Mosorinski (SRB) |

| 8 January 2012; 19:00 | Turkey | 26 – 34 | Portugal | Edip Buran Sport Hall, Mersin; Attendance: 700; Referees: Dentz, Reibel (FRA) |
| 8 January 2012; 19:00 | Özbahar 6 | (16–16) | Tavares 11 | Edip Buran Sport Hall, Mersin; Attendance: 700; Referees: Dentz, Reibel (FRA) |
| 8 January 2012; 19:00 | 3× (yellow card) 6× (suspension) | Report | 3× (yellow card) 5× (suspension) | Edip Buran Sport Hall, Mersin; Attendance: 700; Referees: Dentz, Reibel (FRA) |

| 12 January 2012; 18:00 | Ukraine | 21 – 25 | Portugal | Citysporthall, Zaporozhye; Attendance: 2,500; Referees: Cvetko, Kavalar (SLO) |
| 12 January 2012; 18:00 | three players 3 | (7–12) | Ramos Magalhaes 8 | Citysporthall, Zaporozhye; Attendance: 2,500; Referees: Cvetko, Kavalar (SLO) |
| 12 January 2012; 18:00 | 3× (yellow card) 2× (suspension) | Report | 3× (yellow card) 3× (suspension) | Citysporthall, Zaporozhye; Attendance: 2,500; Referees: Cvetko, Kavalar (SLO) |

| 15 January 2012; 15:00 | Portugal | 27 – 26 | Ukraine | Nave Polivalenta de Espinho, Espinho; Attendance: 2,500; Referees: Leandersson, Lindroos (FIN) |
| 15 January 2012; 15:00 | Pedroso 7 | (15–13) | Burka, Kozakevych 5 | Nave Polivalenta de Espinho, Espinho; Attendance: 2,500; Referees: Leandersson, Lindroos (FIN) |
| 15 January 2012; 15:00 | 3× (yellow card) 8× (suspension) | Report | 3× (yellow card) 7× (suspension) 2× (red card) | Nave Polivalenta de Espinho, Espinho; Attendance: 2,500; Referees: Leandersson, Lindroos (FIN) |

=== Group 3 ===
| Pos | Team | Pld | W | D | L | GF | GA | GD | Pts | Qualification |
|---|---|---|---|---|---|---|---|---|---|---|
| 1 | Montenegro | 4 | 4 | 0 | 0 | 135 | 118 | +17 | 8 | Playoffs |
| 2 | Latvia | 4 | 2 | 0 | 2 | 126 | 120 | +6 | 4 | |
| 3 | Belgium | 4 | 0 | 0 | 4 | 117 | 140 | −23 | 0 | |

| 2 November 2011; 20:15 | Belgium | 29 – 36 | Latvia | Lange Munte, Kortrijk; Attendance: 1,600; Referees: Santos, Fonseca (POR) |
| 2 November 2011; 20:15 | Cauwenberghs 6 | (12–21) | Jurdzs, Lilienfelds 7 | Lange Munte, Kortrijk; Attendance: 1,600; Referees: Santos, Fonseca (POR) |
| 2 November 2011; 20:15 | 2× (yellow card) 2× (suspension) | Report | 2× (yellow card) 3× (suspension) | Lange Munte, Kortrijk; Attendance: 1,600; Referees: Santos, Fonseca (POR) |

| 5 November 2011; 15:05 | Latvia | 32 – 28 | Belgium | Sports Centre Dobele, Dobele; Attendance: 1,000; Referees: Mäkinen, Jonsson (SWE) |
| 5 November 2011; 15:05 | Krištopāns, Pavlovičs 7 | (18–13) | Cauwenberghs 6 | Sports Centre Dobele, Dobele; Attendance: 1,000; Referees: Mäkinen, Jonsson (SWE) |
| 5 November 2011; 15:05 | 3× (yellow card) 9× (suspension) | Report | 3× (yellow card) 4× (suspension) | Sports Centre Dobele, Dobele; Attendance: 1,000; Referees: Mäkinen, Jonsson (SWE) |

| 4 January 2012; 18:00 | Montenegro | 35 – 27 | Belgium | Sala RK Lovćen, Cetinje; Attendance: 1,000; Referees: Katsikis, Michailidis (GRE) |
| 4 January 2012; 18:00 | Rakčević 8 | (18–13) | Houbrechts 6 | Sala RK Lovćen, Cetinje; Attendance: 1,000; Referees: Katsikis, Michailidis (GRE) |
| 4 January 2012; 18:00 | 3× (yellow card) 1× (suspension) | Report | 2× (yellow card) 4× (suspension) | Sala RK Lovćen, Cetinje; Attendance: 1,000; Referees: Katsikis, Michailidis (GRE) |

| 7 January 2012; 20:00 | Belgium | 33 – 37 | Montenegro | Hall de la C.E.T., Tournai; Attendance: 800; Referees: Baranowski, Lemanowicz (POL) |
| 7 January 2012; 20:00 | Cauwenberghs 10 | (13–21) | Mrvaljević 7 | Hall de la C.E.T., Tournai; Attendance: 800; Referees: Baranowski, Lemanowicz (POL) |
| 7 January 2012; 20:00 | 3× (yellow card) 2× (suspension) | Report | 3× (yellow card) 3× (suspension) | Hall de la C.E.T., Tournai; Attendance: 800; Referees: Baranowski, Lemanowicz (POL) |

| 11 January 2012; 19:05 | Latvia | 30 – 31 | Montenegro | Sports Centre Dobele, Dobele; Attendance: 900; Referees: Togstad, Kristiansen (NOR) |
| 11 January 2012; 19:05 | Pavlovičs 6 | (14–17) | Melić 9 | Sports Centre Dobele, Dobele; Attendance: 900; Referees: Togstad, Kristiansen (NOR) |
| 11 January 2012; 19:05 | 3× (yellow card) 3× (suspension) | Report | 3× (yellow card) 2× (suspension) | Sports Centre Dobele, Dobele; Attendance: 900; Referees: Togstad, Kristiansen (NOR) |

| 14 January 2012; 18:00 | Montenegro | 32 – 28 | Latvia | Sala RK Lovćen, Cetinje; Attendance: 1,000; Referees: Erdogan, Özdeniz (TUR) |
| 14 January 2012; 18:00 | Melić 7 | (15–14) | four players 5 | Sala RK Lovćen, Cetinje; Attendance: 1,000; Referees: Erdogan, Özdeniz (TUR) |
| 14 January 2012; 18:00 | 3× (yellow card) 8× (suspension) 1× (red card) | Report | 3× (yellow card) 2× (suspension) | Sala RK Lovćen, Cetinje; Attendance: 1,000; Referees: Erdogan, Özdeniz (TUR) |

=== Group 4 ===
| Pos | Team | Pld | W | D | L | GF | GA | GD | Pts | Qualification |
|---|---|---|---|---|---|---|---|---|---|---|
| 1 | Netherlands | 4 | 3 | 1 | 0 | 119 | 112 | +7 | 7 | Playoffs |
| 2 | Estonia | 4 | 1 | 1 | 2 | 121 | 119 | +2 | 3 | |
| 3 | Finland | 4 | 1 | 0 | 3 | 104 | 113 | −9 | 2 | |

| 2 November 2011; 19:00 | Finland | 23 – 26 | Netherlands | Energia Areena, Vantaa; Attendance: 2,200; Referees: Rutkovskis, Dzerve (LAT) |
| 2 November 2011; 19:00 | Karlsson 5 | (9–16) | Miedema 7 | Energia Areena, Vantaa; Attendance: 2,200; Referees: Rutkovskis, Dzerve (LAT) |
| 2 November 2011; 19:00 | 2× (yellow card) | Report | 2× (yellow card) 2× (suspension) | Energia Areena, Vantaa; Attendance: 2,200; Referees: Rutkovskis, Dzerve (LAT) |

| 5 November 2011; 19:30 | Netherlands | 29 – 26 | Finland | Sportcentrum Glanerbrook, Geleen; Attendance: 1,000; Referees: Mykolaitis, Sniurevicius (LTU) |
| 5 November 2011; 19:30 | Konitz, Schagen 6 | (11–14) | Karlsson, Rönnberg 7 | Sportcentrum Glanerbrook, Geleen; Attendance: 1,000; Referees: Mykolaitis, Sniurevicius (LTU) |
| 5 November 2011; 19:30 | 3× (yellow card) 3× (suspension) | Report | 3× (yellow card) 1× (suspension) | Sportcentrum Glanerbrook, Geleen; Attendance: 1,000; Referees: Mykolaitis, Sniurevicius (LTU) |

| 5 January 2012; 20:00 | Estonia | 31 – 27 | Finland | Mesikäpa Hall, Põlva; Attendance: 1,000; Referees: Schaller, Wutzler (GER) |
| 5 January 2012; 20:00 | Jaanimaa, Patrail 7 | (17–18) | Karlsson, Skogberg 7 | Mesikäpa Hall, Põlva; Attendance: 1,000; Referees: Schaller, Wutzler (GER) |
| 5 January 2012; 20:00 | 2× (yellow card) 4× (suspension) | Report | 2× (yellow card) 5× (suspension) | Mesikäpa Hall, Põlva; Attendance: 1,000; Referees: Schaller, Wutzler (GER) |

| 7 January 2012; 13:30 | Finland | 28 – 27 | Estonia | Sisu Arena, Karis; Attendance: 750; Referees: Leszczyński, Piechota (POL) |
| 7 January 2012; 13:30 | Karlsson 12 | (14–14) | Mägi 5 | Sisu Arena, Karis; Attendance: 750; Referees: Leszczyński, Piechota (POL) |
| 7 January 2012; 13:30 | 3× (yellow card) 2× (suspension) | Report | 2× (yellow card) 2× (suspension) | Sisu Arena, Karis; Attendance: 750; Referees: Leszczyński, Piechota (POL) |

| 11 January 2012; 19:30 | Netherlands | 35 – 35 | Estonia | Sportcentrum Glanerbrook, Geleen; Attendance: 1,000; Referees: Bernet, Wick (SUI) |
| 11 January 2012; 19:30 | Konitz 8 | (19–20) | Pinnonen 7 | Sportcentrum Glanerbrook, Geleen; Attendance: 1,000; Referees: Bernet, Wick (SUI) |
| 11 January 2012; 19:30 | 3× (yellow card) 5× (suspension) | Report | 3× (yellow card) 3× (suspension) 1× (red card) | Sportcentrum Glanerbrook, Geleen; Attendance: 1,000; Referees: Bernet, Wick (SUI) |

| 14 January 2012; 16:00 | Estonia | 28 – 29 | Netherlands | Mesikäpa Hall, Põlva; Attendance: 1,000; Referees: Kekes, Kekes (HUN) |
| 14 January 2012; 16:00 | Patrail 11 | (13–14) | Adams 9 | Mesikäpa Hall, Põlva; Attendance: 1,000; Referees: Kekes, Kekes (HUN) |
| 14 January 2012; 16:00 | 3× (yellow card) 2× (suspension) | Report | 3× (yellow card) 8× (suspension) 1× (red card) | Mesikäpa Hall, Põlva; Attendance: 1,000; Referees: Kekes, Kekes (HUN) |

=== Group 5 ===
| Pos | Team | Pld | W | D | L | GF | GA | GD | Pts | Qualification |
|---|---|---|---|---|---|---|---|---|---|---|
| 1 | Lithuania | 4 | 2 | 2 | 0 | 111 | 100 | +11 | 6 | Playoffs |
| 2 | Switzerland | 4 | 2 | 1 | 1 | 114 | 106 | +8 | 5 | |
| 3 | Italy | 4 | 0 | 1 | 3 | 104 | 123 | −19 | 1 | |

| 2 November 2011; 18:00 | Italy | 25 – 27 | Switzerland | Sporthalle Sportzone Süd, Brixen; Attendance: 1,000; Referees: Lah, Sok (SLO) |
| 2 November 2011; 18:00 | Carrara 6 | (17–14) | Liniger 9 | Sporthalle Sportzone Süd, Brixen; Attendance: 1,000; Referees: Lah, Sok (SLO) |
| 2 November 2011; 18:00 | 3× (yellow card) 4× (suspension) | Report | 3× (yellow card) 4× (suspension) | Sporthalle Sportzone Süd, Brixen; Attendance: 1,000; Referees: Lah, Sok (SLO) |

| 6 November 2011; 15:30 | Switzerland | 37 – 29 | Italy | BBC Arena, Schaffhausen; Attendance: 1,500; Referees: Schulze, Tönnies (GER) |
| 6 November 2011; 15:30 | Schmid 9 | (19–14) | Maione 11 | BBC Arena, Schaffhausen; Attendance: 1,500; Referees: Schulze, Tönnies (GER) |
| 6 November 2011; 15:30 | 2× (yellow card) 4× (suspension) | Report | 3× (yellow card) 4× (suspension) | BBC Arena, Schaffhausen; Attendance: 1,500; Referees: Schulze, Tönnies (GER) |

| 5 January 2012; 19:00 | Lithuania | 34 – 25 | Italy | Siemens Arena, Vilnius; Attendance: 2,500; Referees: Horváth, Marton (HUN) |
| 5 January 2012; 19:00 | three players 5 | (15–9) | Gaeta 6 | Siemens Arena, Vilnius; Attendance: 2,500; Referees: Horváth, Marton (HUN) |
| 5 January 2012; 19:00 | 3× (yellow card) 5× (suspension) | Report | 2× (yellow card) 4× (suspension) | Siemens Arena, Vilnius; Attendance: 2,500; Referees: Horváth, Marton (HUN) |

| 7 January 2012; 21:00 | Italy | 25 – 25 | Lithuania | Cologne; Attendance: 900; Referees: Cacador, Nicolau (POR) |
| 7 January 2012; 21:00 | Carrara 6 | (14–11) | Novickis 6 | Cologne; Attendance: 900; Referees: Cacador, Nicolau (POR) |
| 7 January 2012; 21:00 | 3× (yellow card) 3× (suspension) | Report | 3× (yellow card) 3× (suspension) 1× (red card) | Cologne; Attendance: 900; Referees: Cacador, Nicolau (POR) |

| 12 January 2012; 20:00 | Switzerland | 26 – 28 | Lithuania | BBC Arena, Schaffhausen; Attendance: 1,100; Referees: San Jose, Murcia (ESP) |
| 12 January 2012; 20:00 | three players 5 | (13–14) | Atajevas 10 | BBC Arena, Schaffhausen; Attendance: 1,100; Referees: San Jose, Murcia (ESP) |
| 12 January 2012; 20:00 | 3× (yellow card) 6× (suspension) | Report | 3× (yellow card) 10× (suspension) 2× (red card) | BBC Arena, Schaffhausen; Attendance: 1,100; Referees: San Jose, Murcia (ESP) |

| 15 January 2012; 19:00 | Lithuania | 24 – 24 | Switzerland | Siemens Arena, Vilnius; Attendance: 3,400; Referees: Opava, Valek (CZE) |
| 15 January 2012; 19:00 | Račkauskas 7 | (12–15) | Vukelič 5 | Siemens Arena, Vilnius; Attendance: 3,400; Referees: Opava, Valek (CZE) |
| 15 January 2012; 19:00 | 2× (yellow card) 5× (suspension) | Report | 2× (yellow card) 4× (suspension) | Siemens Arena, Vilnius; Attendance: 3,400; Referees: Opava, Valek (CZE) |

=== Group 6 ===
| Pos | Team | Pld | W | D | L | GF | GA | GD | Pts | Qualification |
|---|---|---|---|---|---|---|---|---|---|---|
| 1 | Bosnia and Herzegovina | 4 | 4 | 0 | 0 | 124 | 97 | +27 | 8 | Playoffs |
| 2 | Greece | 4 | 2 | 0 | 2 | 112 | 94 | +18 | 4 | |
| 3 | Cyprus | 4 | 0 | 0 | 4 | 86 | 131 | −45 | 0 | |

| 2 November 2011; 19:00 | Cyprus | 20 – 38 | Bosnia and Herzegovina | Cyprus College Athletic Centre, Nicosia; Attendance: 400; Referees: Andorka, Andorka (HUN) |
| 2 November 2011; 19:00 | Efstathiadis 5 | (8–18) | Stojanovic, Vrazalic 6 | Cyprus College Athletic Centre, Nicosia; Attendance: 400; Referees: Andorka, Andorka (HUN) |
| 2 November 2011; 19:00 | 2× (yellow card) 4× (suspension) | Report | 3× (yellow card) 4× (suspension) | Cyprus College Athletic Centre, Nicosia; Attendance: 400; Referees: Andorka, Andorka (HUN) |

| 5 November 2011; 20:15 | Bosnia and Herzegovina | 32 – 26 | Cyprus | Gradska dvorana, Goražde; Attendance: 2,000; Referees: Kavulic, Skruzny (CZE) |
| 5 November 2011; 20:15 | Stojanovic 7 | (13–9) | Papakyprianou 8 | Gradska dvorana, Goražde; Attendance: 2,000; Referees: Kavulic, Skruzny (CZE) |
| 5 November 2011; 20:15 | 3× (yellow card) 3× (suspension) | Report | 3× (yellow card) 8× (suspension) | Gradska dvorana, Goražde; Attendance: 2,000; Referees: Kavulic, Skruzny (CZE) |

| 4 January 2012; 19:00 | Greece | 31 – 13 | Cyprus | Mikras 3, Thessaloniki; Attendance: 500; Referees: Cîrligeanu, Florescu (ROU) |
| 4 January 2012; 19:00 | three players 5 | (11–6) | Argyrou 4 | Mikras 3, Thessaloniki; Attendance: 500; Referees: Cîrligeanu, Florescu (ROU) |
| 4 January 2012; 19:00 | 3× (yellow card) 6× (suspension) | Report | 3× (yellow card) 5× (suspension) | Mikras 3, Thessaloniki; Attendance: 500; Referees: Cîrligeanu, Florescu (ROU) |

| 8 January 2012; 17:00 | Cyprus | 27 – 30 | Greece | University of Cyprus Athletic Center, Nicosia; Attendance: 450; Referees: Maric, Masic (SRB) |
| 8 January 2012; 17:00 | Papakyprianou 10 | (15–17) | Tzimourtos 8 | University of Cyprus Athletic Center, Nicosia; Attendance: 450; Referees: Maric, Masic (SRB) |
| 8 January 2012; 17:00 | 3× (yellow card) 4× (suspension) | Report | 2× (yellow card) 6× (suspension) | University of Cyprus Athletic Center, Nicosia; Attendance: 450; Referees: Maric, Masic (SRB) |

| 11 January 2012; 18:00 | Bosnia and Herzegovina | 31 – 29 | Greece | Gradska dvorana, Goražde; Attendance: 2,500; Referees: Pedersen, Mortensen (DEN) |
| 11 January 2012; 18:00 | Celica, Stojanović 5 | (15–17) | Balomenos 8 | Gradska dvorana, Goražde; Attendance: 2,500; Referees: Pedersen, Mortensen (DEN) |
| 11 January 2012; 18:00 | 1× (yellow card) 4× (suspension) | Report | 2× (yellow card) 5× (suspension) | Gradska dvorana, Goražde; Attendance: 2,500; Referees: Pedersen, Mortensen (DEN) |

| 15 January 2012; 18:00 | Greece | 22 – 23 | Bosnia and Herzegovina | Mikras 3, Thessaloniki; Referees: Dobrovits, Tajok (HUN) |
| 15 January 2012; 18:00 | Alvanos 6 | (8–8) | Karačić 7 | Mikras 3, Thessaloniki; Referees: Dobrovits, Tajok (HUN) |
| 15 January 2012; 18:00 | 3× (yellow card) 3× (suspension) | Report | 3× (yellow card) 8× (suspension) 2× (red card) | Mikras 3, Thessaloniki; Referees: Dobrovits, Tajok (HUN) |

=== Group 7 ===
| Pos | Team | Pld | W | D | L | GF | GA | GD | Pts | Qualification |
|---|---|---|---|---|---|---|---|---|---|---|
| 1 | Belarus | 4 | 3 | 0 | 1 | 120 | 99 | +21 | 6 | Playoffs |
| 2 | Romania | 4 | 3 | 0 | 1 | 109 | 92 | +17 | 6 | |
| 3 | Luxembourg | 4 | 0 | 0 | 4 | 93 | 131 | −38 | 0 | |

| 2 November 2011; 19:30 | Luxembourg | 20 – 35 | Romania | Centre Sportif Schifflange, Schifflange; Attendance: 600; Referees: Stokes, Bartlett (SCO) |
| 2 November 2011; 19:30 | Decker 5 | (8–17) | Csepreghi, Sabou 6 | Centre Sportif Schifflange, Schifflange; Attendance: 600; Referees: Stokes, Bartlett (SCO) |
| 2 November 2011; 19:30 | 3× (yellow card) 4× (suspension) | Report | 3× (yellow card) 3× (suspension) | Centre Sportif Schifflange, Schifflange; Attendance: 600; Referees: Stokes, Bartlett (SCO) |

| 5 November 2011; 15:30 | Romania | 26 – 22 | Luxembourg | Sala Polivalentă, Piatra Neamț; Attendance: 2,300; Referees: Argyridis, Mouttas (CYP) |
| 5 November 2011; 15:30 | Florea 9 | (14–8) | Scholten 7 | Sala Polivalentă, Piatra Neamț; Attendance: 2,300; Referees: Argyridis, Mouttas (CYP) |
| 5 November 2011; 15:30 | 3× (yellow card) 3× (suspension) | Report | 3× (yellow card) 4× (suspension) | Sala Polivalentă, Piatra Neamț; Attendance: 2,300; Referees: Argyridis, Mouttas (CYP) |

| 4 January 2012; 19:00 | Belarus | 37 – 19 | Luxembourg | Sport Complex Olympiets, Mogilev; Attendance: 2,000; Referees: Aliyev, Aghakishiyev (AZE) |
| 4 January 2012; 19:00 | Shylovich 7 | (19–10) | Decker 4 | Sport Complex Olympiets, Mogilev; Attendance: 2,000; Referees: Aliyev, Aghakishiyev (AZE) |
| 4 January 2012; 19:00 | 3× (yellow card) 6× (suspension) | Report | 3× (yellow card) 3× (suspension) | Sport Complex Olympiets, Mogilev; Attendance: 2,000; Referees: Aliyev, Aghakishiyev (AZE) |

| 7 January 2012; 19:00 | Luxembourg | 32 – 33 | Belarus | Hall Omnisport Crauthem, Crauthem; Attendance: 600; Referees: Bol, van Eck (NED) |
| 7 January 2012; 19:00 | three players 6 | (14–14) | S. Rutenka 12 | Hall Omnisport Crauthem, Crauthem; Attendance: 600; Referees: Bol, van Eck (NED) |
| 7 January 2012; 19:00 | 3× (yellow card) 5× (suspension) | Report | 2× (yellow card) 8× (suspension) 1× (red card) | Hall Omnisport Crauthem, Crauthem; Attendance: 600; Referees: Bol, van Eck (NED) |

| 11 January 2012; 19:00 | Romania | 25 – 22 | Belarus | Sala Polivalentă, Bucharest; Attendance: 5,400; Referees: Buy, Pichon (FRA) |
| 11 January 2012; 19:00 | Csepreghi 4 | (12–14) | S. Rutenka 6 | Sala Polivalentă, Bucharest; Attendance: 5,400; Referees: Buy, Pichon (FRA) |
| 11 January 2012; 19:00 | 3× (yellow card) 3× (suspension) | Report | 3× (yellow card) 5× (suspension) 1× (red card) | Sala Polivalentă, Bucharest; Attendance: 5,400; Referees: Buy, Pichon (FRA) |

| 15 January 2012; 14:30 | Belarus | 28 – 23 | Romania | Palace of Sport, Minsk; Attendance: 3,400; Referees: Hansen, Pettersen (NOR) |
| 15 January 2012; 14:30 | S. Rutenka 11 | (15–12) | Ghionea 5 | Palace of Sport, Minsk; Attendance: 3,400; Referees: Hansen, Pettersen (NOR) |
| 15 January 2012; 14:30 | 3× (yellow card) 8× (suspension) | Report | 3× (yellow card) 5× (suspension) | Palace of Sport, Minsk; Attendance: 3,400; Referees: Hansen, Pettersen (NOR) |

== Playoff round ==
=== Seedings ===
Following the main round of the 2012 European Men's Handball Championship was concluded, five of the sixteen participants earned an automatic spot for the World Championship, namely Spain (hosts), France (title holders), Croatia, Denmark and Serbia. The remaining eleven teams were split into two pots, with the 7 best ranked national teams in the first one, and the remaining four in the second one.

The drawing procedure was carried out on 29 January 2012 at the Belgrade Arena during the final day of the European Championship. Games are scheduled to be played on 9–10 June and 16–17 June 2012.

| Pot 1 (7 best ranked teams from the 2012 European Championship) | Pot 2 (4 lowest ranked teams from the 2012 European Championship) | Pot 3 (teams from the qualification round) |
|---|---|---|
| Germany; Hungary; Iceland; Macedonia; Poland; Slovenia; Sweden | Czech Republic (drawn to pot 3); Norway (drawn to pot 3); Russia (drawn to pot 1); Slovakia (drawn to pot 1); Two Teams were drawn to pot 1 and two teams were drawn to pot 3. Then the teams in pot 1 and 3 were drawn against each other. | Austria; Bosnia and Herzegovina; Belarus; Lithuania; Montenegro; Netherlands; Portugal |

=== Matches ===
| Team 1 | Agg. | Team 2 | 1st leg | 2nd leg |
|---|---|---|---|---|
| Lithuania | 39–50 | Poland | 17–24 | 22–26 |
| Russia | 54–49 | Czech Republic | 23–22 | 31–27 |
| Slovenia | 58–52 | Portugal | 31–26 | 27–26 |
| Slovakia | 49–50 | Belarus | 24–26 | 25–24 |
| Macedonia | 53–51 | Austria | 26–21 | 27–30 |
| Hungary | 54–52 | Norway | 27–21 | 27–31 |
| Iceland | 73–51 | Netherlands | 41–27 | 32–24 |
| Germany | 60–57 | Bosnia and Herzegovina | 36–24 | 24–33 |
| Sweden | 40–41 | Montenegro | 22–21 | 18–20 |

All times are local.

=== First leg ===
| 9 June 2012; 15:00 | Russia | 23 – 22 | Czech Republic | Sportcomplex Zvezdniy, Astrakhan; Attendance: 4,000; Referees: Gubica, Milosevic (CRO) |
| 9 June 2012; 15:00 | Gorbok 5 | (11–12) | Horák 7 | Sportcomplex Zvezdniy, Astrakhan; Attendance: 4,000; Referees: Gubica, Milosevic (CRO) |
| 9 June 2012; 15:00 | 3× (yellow card) 4× (suspension) | Report | 2× (yellow card) 2× (suspension) | Sportcomplex Zvezdniy, Astrakhan; Attendance: 4,000; Referees: Gubica, Milosevic (CRO) |

| 9 June 2012; 15:00 | Slovenia | 31 – 26 | Portugal | Arena Stožice, Ljubljana; Attendance: 3,000; Referees: Horacek, Novotny (CZE) |
| 9 June 2012; 15:00 | Dolenec 8 | (11–10) | Ferraz 5 | Arena Stožice, Ljubljana; Attendance: 3,000; Referees: Horacek, Novotny (CZE) |
| 9 June 2012; 15:00 | 3× (yellow card) 4× (suspension) | Report | 3× (yellow card) 6× (suspension) 2× (red card) | Arena Stožice, Ljubljana; Attendance: 3,000; Referees: Horacek, Novotny (CZE) |

| 9 June 2012; 15:15 | Germany | 36 – 24 | Bosnia and Herzegovina | Porsche Arena, Stuttgart; Attendance: 6,200; Referees: Olesen, Pedersen (DEN) |
| 9 June 2012; 15:15 | Gensheimer 8 | (18–7) | Vražalić 7 | Porsche Arena, Stuttgart; Attendance: 6,200; Referees: Olesen, Pedersen (DEN) |
| 9 June 2012; 15:15 | 3× (yellow card) 7× (suspension) | Report | 2× (yellow card) 8× (suspension) 1× (red card) | Porsche Arena, Stuttgart; Attendance: 6,200; Referees: Olesen, Pedersen (DEN) |

| 9 June 2012; 16:00 | Slovakia | 24 – 26 | Belarus | Košice; Attendance: 4,500; Referees: Leifsson, Palsson (ISL) |
| 9 June 2012; 16:00 | three players 5 | (10–12) | Rutenka 9 | Košice; Attendance: 4,500; Referees: Leifsson, Palsson (ISL) |
| 9 June 2012; 16:00 | 3× (yellow card) 6× (suspension) | Report | 3× (yellow card) 6× (suspension) | Košice; Attendance: 4,500; Referees: Leifsson, Palsson (ISL) |

| 9 June 2012; 16:30 | Macedonia | 26 – 21 | Austria | Boris Trajkovski Sports Center, Skopje; Attendance: 4,500; Referees: Dentz, Reibel (FRA) |
| 9 June 2012; 16:30 | Lazarov, Temelkov 5 | (16–10) | Santos 5 | Boris Trajkovski Sports Center, Skopje; Attendance: 4,500; Referees: Dentz, Reibel (FRA) |
| 9 June 2012; 16:30 | 3× (yellow card) 4× (suspension) | Report | 3× (yellow card) 5× (suspension) 1× (red card) | Boris Trajkovski Sports Center, Skopje; Attendance: 4,500; Referees: Dentz, Reibel (FRA) |

| 10 June 2012; 15:30 | Hungary | 27 – 21 | Norway | Veszprém Aréna, Veszprém; Attendance: 5,000; Referees: Geipel, Helbig (GER) |
| 10 June 2012; 15:30 | Császár, Nagy 6 | (12–10) | Tvedten 6 | Veszprém Aréna, Veszprém; Attendance: 5,000; Referees: Geipel, Helbig (GER) |
| 10 June 2012; 15:30 | 3× (yellow card) 1× (suspension) | Report | 3× (yellow card) 5× (suspension) | Veszprém Aréna, Veszprém; Attendance: 5,000; Referees: Geipel, Helbig (GER) |

| 10 June 2012; 16:15 | Sweden | 22 – 21 | Montenegro | Ericsson Globe, Stockholm; Attendance: 4,700; Referees: Brunovsky, Canda (SVK) |
| 10 June 2012; 16:15 | Ekberg 9 | (12–10) | Ševaljević 7 | Ericsson Globe, Stockholm; Attendance: 4,700; Referees: Brunovsky, Canda (SVK) |
| 10 June 2012; 16:15 | 1× (yellow card) 4× (suspension) | Report | 2× (yellow card) 5× (suspension) | Ericsson Globe, Stockholm; Attendance: 4,700; Referees: Brunovsky, Canda (SVK) |

| 10 June 2012; 16:45 | Lithuania | 17 – 24 | Poland | Siemens Arena, Vilnius; Attendance: 3,000; Referees: Gousko, Repkin (BLR) |
| 10 June 2012; 16:45 | Malašinskas, Strazdas 5 | (9–12) | Jurecki 7 | Siemens Arena, Vilnius; Attendance: 3,000; Referees: Gousko, Repkin (BLR) |
| 10 June 2012; 16:45 | 3× (yellow card) 5× (suspension) | Report | 3× (yellow card) 4× (suspension) | Siemens Arena, Vilnius; Attendance: 3,000; Referees: Gousko, Repkin (BLR) |

| 10 June 2012; 18:30 | Iceland | 41 – 27 | Netherlands | Laugardalshöll, Reykjavík; Attendance: 2,200; Referees: Stolarovs, Licis (LAT) |
| 10 June 2012; 18:30 | Guðjónsson 10 | (17–14) | Adams 7 | Laugardalshöll, Reykjavík; Attendance: 2,200; Referees: Stolarovs, Licis (LAT) |
| 10 June 2012; 18:30 | 3× (yellow card) 1× (suspension) | Report | 3× (yellow card) 5× (suspension) | Laugardalshöll, Reykjavík; Attendance: 2,200; Referees: Stolarovs, Licis (LAT) |

=== Second leg ===
| 16 June 2012; 16:00 | Czech Republic | 27 – 31 | Russia | ČEZ Aréna, Pardubice; Attendance: 5,300; Referees: Abrahamsen, Kristiansen (NOR) |
| 16 June 2012; 16:00 | Filip 7 | (10–18) | Gorbok 9 | ČEZ Aréna, Pardubice; Attendance: 5,300; Referees: Abrahamsen, Kristiansen (NOR) |
| 16 June 2012; 16:00 | 3× (yellow card) 2× (suspension) | Report | 3× (yellow card) 5× (suspension) | ČEZ Aréna, Pardubice; Attendance: 5,300; Referees: Abrahamsen, Kristiansen (NOR) |

| 16 June 2012; 17:00 | Portugal | 26 – 27 | Slovenia | Multusios de Guimarães, Guimarães; Attendance: 3,600; Referees: Lazaar, Reveret (FRA) |
| 16 June 2012; 17:00 | Duante, Rocha 5 | (8–13) | Gajić 12 | Multusios de Guimarães, Guimarães; Attendance: 3,600; Referees: Lazaar, Reveret (FRA) |
| 16 June 2012; 17:00 | 3× (yellow card) 6× (suspension) | Report | 3× (yellow card) 6× (suspension) | Multusios de Guimarães, Guimarães; Attendance: 3,600; Referees: Lazaar, Reveret (FRA) |

| 16 June 2012; 18:30 | Montenegro | 20 – 18 | Sweden | Morača Sports Center, Podgorica; Attendance: 4,200; Referees: Dobrovits, Tajok (HUN) |
| 16 June 2012; 18:30 | Ivanović 9 | (11–9) | Ekberg 5 | Morača Sports Center, Podgorica; Attendance: 4,200; Referees: Dobrovits, Tajok (HUN) |
| 16 June 2012; 18:30 | 2× (yellow card) 2× (suspension) | Report | 3× (yellow card) 3× (suspension) | Morača Sports Center, Podgorica; Attendance: 4,200; Referees: Dobrovits, Tajok (HUN) |

| 16 June 2012; 19:10 | Norway | 31 – 27 | Hungary | Oslo; Attendance: 5,550; Referees: Krstic, Ljubic (SLO) |
| 16 June 2012; 19:10 | Kjelling, Myrhol 7 | (14–13) | five players 4 | Oslo; Attendance: 5,550; Referees: Krstic, Ljubic (SLO) |
| 16 June 2012; 19:10 | 3× (yellow card) 2× (suspension) | Report | 2× (yellow card) 5× (suspension) | Oslo; Attendance: 5,550; Referees: Krstic, Ljubic (SLO) |

| 16 June 2012; 20:00 | Netherlands | 24 – 32 | Iceland | Sportcentrum Glanerbrook, Geleen; Attendance: 500; Referees: Zotin, Volodkov (RUS) |
| 16 June 2012; 20:00 | Schagen 6 | (12–15) | three players 5 | Sportcentrum Glanerbrook, Geleen; Attendance: 500; Referees: Zotin, Volodkov (RUS) |
| 16 June 2012; 20:00 | 3× (yellow card) 4× (suspension) | Report | 3× (yellow card) 6× (suspension) | Sportcentrum Glanerbrook, Geleen; Attendance: 500; Referees: Zotin, Volodkov (RUS) |

| 16 June 2012; 20:25 | Austria | 30 – 27 | Macedonia | Vienna; Attendance: 5,500; Referees: Mazeika, Gatelis (LTU) |
| 16 June 2012; 20:25 | Schlinger 7 | (13–14) | Lazarov 8 | Vienna; Attendance: 5,500; Referees: Mazeika, Gatelis (LTU) |
| 16 June 2012; 20:25 | 3× (yellow card) 4× (suspension) | Report | 3× (yellow card) 5× (suspension) | Vienna; Attendance: 5,500; Referees: Mazeika, Gatelis (LTU) |

| 17 June 2012; 13:30 | Bosnia and Herzegovina | 33 – 24 | Germany | Olympic Hall Zetra, Sarajevo; Attendance: 1,500; Referees: Lopez, Ramirez (ESP) |
| 17 June 2012; 13:30 | Vražalić 9 | (15–12) | Christophersen 6 | Olympic Hall Zetra, Sarajevo; Attendance: 1,500; Referees: Lopez, Ramirez (ESP) |
| 17 June 2012; 13:30 | 3× (yellow card) 5× (suspension) | Report | 3× (yellow card) 6× (suspension) | Olympic Hall Zetra, Sarajevo; Attendance: 1,500; Referees: Lopez, Ramirez (ESP) |

| 17 June 2012; 17:00 | Belarus | 24 – 25 | Slovakia | Minsk-Arena, Minsk; Attendance: 13,200; Referees: Nikolov, Nachevski (MKD) |
| 17 June 2012; 17:00 | Rutenka 8 | (10–12) | Antl 8 | Minsk-Arena, Minsk; Attendance: 13,200; Referees: Nikolov, Nachevski (MKD) |
| 17 June 2012; 17:00 | 3× (yellow card) 5× (suspension) 1× (red card) | Report | 3× (yellow card) 4× (suspension) | Minsk-Arena, Minsk; Attendance: 13,200; Referees: Nikolov, Nachevski (MKD) |

| 17 June 2012; 17:30 | Poland | 26 – 22 | Lithuania | Spodek Arena, Katowice; Attendance: 8,000; Referees: Kekes, Kekes (HUN) |
| 17 June 2012; 17:30 | Kuchczyński 5 | (13–13) | Atajevas 5 | Spodek Arena, Katowice; Attendance: 8,000; Referees: Kekes, Kekes (HUN) |
| 17 June 2012; 17:30 | 2× (yellow card) 3× (suspension) | Report | 3× (yellow card) 4× (suspension) | Spodek Arena, Katowice; Attendance: 8,000; Referees: Kekes, Kekes (HUN) |
