= 2013 World Men's Handball Championship =

Tournament details
- Host country: Spain
- Venues: 6 (in 6 host cities)
- Dates: 11–27 January
- Teams: 24 (from 5 confederations)

Final positions
- Champions: Spain (2nd title)
- Runners-up: Denmark
- Third place: Croatia
- Fourth place: Slovenia

Tournament statistics
- Matches played: 84
- Goals scored: 4,529 (53.92 per match)
- Top scorer: Anders Eggert (DEN) (55 goals)

Awards
- Best player: Mikkel Hansen (DEN)

The 2013 World Men's Handball Championship was the 23rd World Men's Handball Championship, an international handball tournament that took place in Spain from 11 to 27 January 2013. This was the first time Spain hosted the World Men's Handball Championship, becoming the twelfth country to host the competition.

Spain won the title, beating Denmark in the final 35–19. It was Denmark's second final in a row.

== Venues ==
Games in Madrid were scheduled to be played in the Madrid Arena but on 1 November 2012, five young people were killed in a human stampede during a Halloween party. The venue was subsequently closed because of the judicial investigation and the IHF changed the location of games to Caja Mágica.

Barcelona	Madrid	Zaragoza	Granollers
Palau Sant Jordi	Caja Mágica	Pabellón Príncipe Felipe	Palau d'Esports de Granollers
Capacity: 16,500	Capacity: 12,442	Capacity: 11,000	Capacity: 5,685
2013 World Men's Handball Championship is located in Spain			Seville
2013 World Men's Handball Championship is located in Spain			Palacio Municipal de Deportes San Pablo
2013 World Men's Handball Championship is located in Spain			Capacity: 9,500
2013 World Men's Handball Championship is located in Spain			Guadalajara
2013 World Men's Handball Championship is located in Spain			Palacio Multiusos de Guadalajara
2013 World Men's Handball Championship is located in Spain			Capacity: 5,894

== Broadcasting rights ==
- Belarus – Belarus 2
- Brazil – TV Esporte Interativo
- Croatia – HRT
- Denmark – DR, TV 2, TV3 Sport 1
- France – Canal+, Canal+ Sport, Sport+
- Germany – ARD, ZDF, Sport1, Sport1+
- Hungary – Sport 1
- Iceland – Stöð 2 Sport
- Ireland – Setanta Sports (later stages)
- North Macedonia – Sitel TV
- Montenegro – RTCG2
- Poland – TVP
- Portugal – Sport TV
- Qatar – Al Jazeera Sports (for the Arab countries in the Near East and North Africa)
- Romania – Dolce Sport, Dolce Sport 2, Dolce Sport HD
- Russia – NTV Plus
- Serbia – RTS
- Slovenia – RTV Slovenija, Šport TV
- Spain – Teledeporte
- Sweden – TV4
- United States – beIN Sport

== Qualification tournaments ==
Competition	Date	Vacancies	Qualified
European qualification	2 November 2011 – 17 June 2012	9	Russia; Slovenia; Montenegro; Hungary; North Macedonia; Iceland; Germany; Belarus; Poland
2012 African Men's Handball Championship	11–20 January 2012	3	Tunisia; Algeria; Egypt
2012 European Men's Handball Championship	15–29 January 2012	3	Denmark; Serbia; Croatia
2012 Asian Men's Handball Championship	26 January – 5 February 2012	3	South Korea; Qatar; Saudi Arabia
2012 Pan American Men's Handball Championship	18–24 June 2012	3	Argentina; Brazil; Chile
2012 Oceania Handball Championship	22–23 June 2012	1	Australia

== Qualified teams ==
The qualification for the 2013 World Handball Championship took place in the calendar years of 2011 and 2012. As the host nation, Spain and as defending champions, France were automatically qualified for the tournament.

Country	Qualified as	Qualification date	Previous appearances in tournament^{1, 2}
Spain	Host	2 October 2010	16 (1958, 1974, 1978, 1982, 1986, 1990, 1993, 1995, 1997, 1999, 2001, 2003, **2005**, 2007, 2009, 2011)
France	World Champions	30 January 2011	15 (1954, 1961, 1970, 1978, 1990, 1993, **1995**, 1997, 1999, **2001**, 2003, 2005, 2007, **2009**, **2011**)
Tunisia	Finalist of 2012 African Championship	19 January 2012	10 (1967, 1995, 1997, 1999, 2001, 2003, 2005, 2007, 2009, 2011)
Algeria	Finalist of 2012 African Championship	19 January 2012	12 (1974, 1982, 1986, 1990, 1995, 1997, 1999, 2001, 2003, 2005, 2009, 2011)
Egypt	Third at 2012 African Championship	20 January 2012	11 (1964, 1993, 1995, 1997, 1999, 2001, 2003, 2005, 2007, 2009, 2011)
Denmark	Finalist of 2012 European Championship	27 January 2012	19 (1938, 1954, 1958, 1961, 1964, 1967, 1970, 1974, 1978, 1982, 1986, 1993, 1995, 1999, 2003, 2005, 2007, 2009, 2011)
Serbia	Finalist of 2012 European Championship	27 January 2012	2 (2009, 2011)
Croatia	Third at 2012 European Championship	29 January 2012	9 (1995, 1997, 1999, 2001, **2003**, 2005, 2007, 2009, 2011)
South Korea	Finalist of 2012 Asian Championship	3 February 2012	10 (1986, 1990, 1993, 1995, 1997, 1999, 2001, 2007, 2009, 2011)
Qatar	Finalist of 2012 Asian Championship	3 February 2012	3 (2003, 2005, 2007)
Saudi Arabia	Third at 2012 Asian Championship	5 February 2012	5 (1997, 1999, 2001, 2003, 2009)
Russia	European playoffs	16 June 2012	9 (**1993**, 1995, **1997**, 1999, 2001, 2003, 2005, 2007, 2009)
Slovenia	European playoffs	16 June 2012	5 (1995, 2001, 2003, 2005, 2007)
Montenegro	European playoffs	16 June 2012	0 (debut)
Hungary	European playoffs	16 June 2012	17 (1958, 1964, 1967, 1970, 1974, 1978, 1982, 1986, 1990, 1993, 1995, 1997, 1999, 2003, 2007, 2009, 2011)
North Macedonia	European playoffs	16 June 2012	2 (1999, 2009)
Iceland	European playoffs	16 June 2012	16 (1958, 1961, 1964, 1970, 1974, 1978, 1986, 1990, 1993, 1995, 1997, 2001, 2003, 2005, 2007, 2011)
Germany	European playoffs	17 June 2012	21 (**1938**, 1954, 1958, 1961, 1964, 1967, 1970, 1974, **1978**, 1982, 1986, 1990^{3}, 1993, 1995, 1999, 2001, 2003, 2005, **2007**, 2009, 2011)
Belarus	European playoffs	17 June 2012	1 (1995)
Poland	European playoffs	17 June 2012	12 (1958, 1967, 1970, 1974, 1978, 1982, 1986, 1990, 2003, 2007, 2009, 2011)
Australia	Winner of 2012 Oceania Championship	23 June 2012	6 (1999, 2003, 2005, 2007, 2009, 2011)
Argentina	Finalist of 2012 Pan American Championship	23 June 2012	8 (1997, 1999, 2001, 2003, 2005, 2007, 2009, 2011)
Brazil	Finalist of 2012 Pan American Championship	23 June 2012	10 (1958, 1995, 1997, 1999, 2001, 2003, 2005, 2007, 2009, 2011)
Chile	Third at 2012 Pan American Championship	24 June 2012	1 (2011)

^{1} Bold indicates champion for that year
^{2} Italics indicates host for that year
^{3} From both German teams only East Germany was qualified in 1990

== Draw ==
The draw took place on 19 July 2012 in Madrid, Spain.

=== Seeding ===
The pots were announced on 9 July 2012.

Pot 1	Pot 2	Pot 3	Pot 4	Pot 5	Pot 6
France; Denmark; Spain; Serbia	Croatia; North Macedonia; Slovenia; Germany	Hungary; Poland; Iceland; Argentina	South Korea; Tunisia; Algeria; Qatar	Montenegro; Russia; Belarus; Egypt	Brazil; Chile; Saudi Arabia; Australia

== Match officials ==
16 match official pairs were selected for the tournament.

Referees
Brazil	Jesus Menezes; Rogério Pinto
Côte d'Ivoire	Yalatima Coulibaly; Mamadou Diabaté
Croatia	Matija Gubica; Boris Milošević
Czech Republic	Václav Horáček; Jiří Novotný
Germany	Lars Geipel; Marcus Helbig
Iceland	Hlynur Leifsson; Anton Pálsson
North Macedonia	Gjorgje Načevski; Slavko Nikolov
Portugal	Ivan Caçador; Eurico Nicolau

Referees
Qatar	Saleh Bamutref; Mansour Al-Suwaidi
Romania	Bogdan Stark; Romeo Ştefan
Slovenia	Nenad Krstič; Peter Ljubič
Serbia	Nenad Nikolić; Dušan Stojković
Slovakia	Michal Baďura; Jaroslav Ondogrecula
Spain	Ignacio García; Andreu Marín
Spain	Óscar Raluy; Ángel Sabroso
United Arab Emirates	Omar Al-Marzouqi; Mohammad Al-Nuaimi

== Preliminary round ==
The draw was held on 19 July 2012. The playing schedule was published on 5 August 2012. The throw-off times were published on 12 September 2012.

Twenty-four participating teams were placed in the following four groups. After playing a round-robin, the top four teams in each group advanced to the eighth-finals. The last two teams in each group will play placement matches.

=== Tie-breaking criteria ===
For the three game group stage of this tournament, where two or more teams in a group tied on an equal number of points, the finishing positions will be determined by the following tie-breaking criteria in the following order

1. number of points obtained in the matches among the teams in question
2. goal difference in the matches among the teams in question
3. number of goals scored in the matches among the teams in question (if more than two teams finish equal on points)
4. goal difference in all the group matches
5. number of goals scored in all the group matches
6. drawing of lots

Team advanced to Knockout stage

All times are (UTC+1).

=== Group A ===
Team	Pld	W	D	L	GF	GA	GD	Pts
Germany	5	4	0	1	148	126	+22	8
France	5	4	0	1	154	124	+30	8
Brazil	5	3	0	2	122	127	−5	6
Tunisia	5	3	0	2	123	123	0	6
Argentina	5	1	0	4	116	138	−22	2
Montenegro	5	0	0	5	117	142	−25	0

12 January 2013; 16:00	Germany	33–23	Brazil	Palau D'Esports de Granollers, Granollers; Attendance: 4,000; Referees: Gubica, Milošević (CRO)
12 January 2013; 16:00	Weinhold 7	(12–10)	three players 4	Palau D'Esports de Granollers, Granollers; Attendance: 4,000; Referees: Gubica, Milošević (CRO)
12 January 2013; 16:00	3× (yellow card) 1× (suspension)	Report	3× (yellow card) 3× (suspension)	Palau D'Esports de Granollers, Granollers; Attendance: 4,000; Referees: Gubica, Milošević (CRO)

12 January 2013; 18:15	Argentina	28–26	Montenegro	Palau D'Esports de Granollers, Granollers; Referees: Al-Marzouqi, Al-Nuaimi (UAE)
12 January 2013; 18:15	D. Simonet 7	(13–12)	Roganović 6	Palau D'Esports de Granollers, Granollers; Referees: Al-Marzouqi, Al-Nuaimi (UAE)
12 January 2013; 18:15	3× (yellow card) 3× (suspension)	Report	3× (yellow card) 5× (suspension) 1× (red card)	Palau D'Esports de Granollers, Granollers; Referees: Al-Marzouqi, Al-Nuaimi (UAE)

12 January 2013; 20:45	France	30–27	Tunisia	Palau D'Esports de Granollers, Granollers; Attendance: 4,500; Referees: Raluy, Sabroso (ESP)
12 January 2013; 20:45	Fernandez, Abalo 6	(13–14)	Bannour 7	Palau D'Esports de Granollers, Granollers; Attendance: 4,500; Referees: Raluy, Sabroso (ESP)
12 January 2013; 20:45	3× (yellow card) 3× (suspension)	Report	3× (yellow card) 7× (suspension)	Palau D'Esports de Granollers, Granollers; Attendance: 4,500; Referees: Raluy, Sabroso (ESP)

13 January 2013; 15:00	Brazil	24–20	Argentina	Palau D'Esports de Granollers, Granollers; Attendance: 3,000; Referees: Raluy, Sabroso (ESP)
13 January 2013; 15:00	Pacheco 8	(9–8)	Fernández, D. Simonet 5	Palau D'Esports de Granollers, Granollers; Attendance: 3,000; Referees: Raluy, Sabroso (ESP)
13 January 2013; 15:00	3× (yellow card) 7× (suspension)	Report	3× (yellow card) 6× (suspension)	Palau D'Esports de Granollers, Granollers; Attendance: 3,000; Referees: Raluy, Sabroso (ESP)

13 January 2013; 17:20	Tunisia	25–23	Germany	Palau D'Esports de Granollers, Granollers; Referees: Leifsson, Pálsson (ISL)
13 January 2013; 17:20	Jallouz 8	(13–13)	Christophersen 7	Palau D'Esports de Granollers, Granollers; Referees: Leifsson, Pálsson (ISL)
13 January 2013; 17:20	3× (yellow card) 5× (suspension)	Report	2× (yellow card) 4× (suspension)	Palau D'Esports de Granollers, Granollers; Referees: Leifsson, Pálsson (ISL)

13 January 2013; 19:30	Montenegro	20–32	France	Palau D'Esports de Granollers, Granollers; Attendance: 5,200; Referees: Gubica, Milošević (CRO)
13 January 2013; 19:30	Ševaljević 5	(11–17)	Fernandez 6	Palau D'Esports de Granollers, Granollers; Attendance: 5,200; Referees: Gubica, Milošević (CRO)
13 January 2013; 19:30	3× (yellow card) 3× (suspension) 1× (red card)	Report	3× (yellow card) 1× (suspension)	Palau D'Esports de Granollers, Granollers; Attendance: 5,200; Referees: Gubica, Milošević (CRO)

15 January 2013; 16:00	Tunisia	27–25	Montenegro	Palau D'Esports de Granollers, Granollers; Attendance: 2,300; Referees: García, Marín (ESP)
15 January 2013; 16:00	Toumi, Ben Salah 5	(11–11)	Melić 6	Palau D'Esports de Granollers, Granollers; Attendance: 2,300; Referees: García, Marín (ESP)
15 January 2013; 16:00	4× (yellow card) 5× (suspension)	Report	3× (yellow card) 4× (suspension)	Palau D'Esports de Granollers, Granollers; Attendance: 2,300; Referees: García, Marín (ESP)

15 January 2013; 18:15	Germany	31–27	Argentina	Palau D'Esports de Granollers, Granollers; Referees: Stark, Ştefan (ROU)
15 January 2013; 18:15	Wiencek 5	(17–13)	D. Simonet 9	Palau D'Esports de Granollers, Granollers; Referees: Stark, Ştefan (ROU)
15 January 2013; 18:15	3× (yellow card) 6× (suspension)	Report	3× (yellow card) 5× (suspension)	Palau D'Esports de Granollers, Granollers; Referees: Stark, Ştefan (ROU)

15 January 2013; 20:45	France	27–22	Brazil	Palau D'Esports de Granollers, Granollers; Attendance: 3,400; Referees: Raluy, Sabroso (ESP)
15 January 2013; 20:45	Guigou 6	(12–5)	Pozzer 4	Palau D'Esports de Granollers, Granollers; Attendance: 3,400; Referees: Raluy, Sabroso (ESP)
15 January 2013; 20:45	2× (yellow card)	Report	3× (yellow card) 4× (suspension)	Palau D'Esports de Granollers, Granollers; Attendance: 3,400; Referees: Raluy, Sabroso (ESP)

16 January 2013; 16:00	Brazil	27–22	Tunisia	Palau D'Esports de Granollers, Granollers; Referees: Gubica, Milošević (CRO)
16 January 2013; 16:00	Cândido 5	(13–11)	Alouini 6	Palau D'Esports de Granollers, Granollers; Referees: Gubica, Milošević (CRO)
16 January 2013; 16:00	3× (yellow card) 1× (suspension)	Report	3× (yellow card) 5× (suspension) 1× (red card)	Palau D'Esports de Granollers, Granollers; Referees: Gubica, Milošević (CRO)

16 January 2013; 18:30	Germany	29–21	Montenegro	Palau D'Esports de Granollers, Granollers; Attendance: 3,600; Referees: Baďura, Ondogrecula (SVK)
16 January 2013; 18:30	Theuerkauf, Klein 4	(13–11)	Melić 7	Palau D'Esports de Granollers, Granollers; Attendance: 3,600; Referees: Baďura, Ondogrecula (SVK)
16 January 2013; 18:30	4× (yellow card) 4× (suspension)	Report	4× (yellow card) 5× (suspension)	Palau D'Esports de Granollers, Granollers; Attendance: 3,600; Referees: Baďura, Ondogrecula (SVK)

16 January 2013; 20:45	Argentina	23–35	France	Palau D'Esports de Granollers, Granollers; Attendance: 2,800; Referees: García, Marín (ESP)
16 January 2013; 20:45	P. Simonet 8	(6–19)	Honrubia 7	Palau D'Esports de Granollers, Granollers; Attendance: 2,800; Referees: García, Marín (ESP)
16 January 2013; 20:45	3× (yellow card) 5× (suspension)	Report	3× (yellow card) 4× (suspension)	Palau D'Esports de Granollers, Granollers; Attendance: 2,800; Referees: García, Marín (ESP)

18 January 2013; 16:00	Argentina	18–22	Tunisia	Palau Sant Jordi, Barcelona; Referees: Raluy, Sabroso (ESP)
18 January 2013; 16:00	S. Simonet 4	(6–7)	Ben Salah 5	Palau Sant Jordi, Barcelona; Referees: Raluy, Sabroso (ESP)
18 January 2013; 16:00	3× (yellow card) 3× (suspension)	Report	4× (yellow card) 5× (suspension)	Palau Sant Jordi, Barcelona; Referees: Raluy, Sabroso (ESP)

18 January 2013; 18:15	France	30–32	Germany	Palau Sant Jordi, Barcelona; Attendance: 10,000; Referees: García, Marín (ESP)
18 January 2013; 18:15	Karabatić 8	(16–16)	Groetzki 6	Palau Sant Jordi, Barcelona; Attendance: 10,000; Referees: García, Marín (ESP)
18 January 2013; 18:15	4× (yellow card) 4× (suspension)	Report	3× (yellow card) 7× (suspension)	Palau Sant Jordi, Barcelona; Attendance: 10,000; Referees: García, Marín (ESP)

18 January 2013; 20:45	Montenegro	25–26	Brazil	Palau Sant Jordi, Barcelona; Attendance: 2,000; Referees: Al-Marzouqi, Al-Nuaimi (UAE)
18 January 2013; 20:45	Rakčević 7	(10–11)	Ribeiro 7	Palau Sant Jordi, Barcelona; Attendance: 2,000; Referees: Al-Marzouqi, Al-Nuaimi (UAE)
18 January 2013; 20:45	3× (yellow card) 4× (suspension)	Report	3× (yellow card) 6× (suspension) 1× (red card)	Palau Sant Jordi, Barcelona; Attendance: 2,000; Referees: Al-Marzouqi, Al-Nuaimi (UAE)

=== Group B ===
Team	Pld	W	D	L	GF	GA	GD	Pts
Denmark	5	5	0	0	184	136	+48	10
Russia	5	3	1	1	151	131	+20	7
Iceland	5	3	0	2	153	136	+17	6
North Macedonia	5	2	1	2	142	143	−1	5
Qatar	5	1	0	4	139	166	−27	2
Chile	5	0	0	5	121	178	−57	0

12 January 2013; 15:45	North Macedonia	30–28	Chile	Palacio Municipal de Deportes San Pablo, Seville; Referees: Coulibaly, Diabaté (CIV)
12 January 2013; 15:45	K. Lazarov 8	(12–10)	Salinas 8	Palacio Municipal de Deportes San Pablo, Seville; Referees: Coulibaly, Diabaté (CIV)
12 January 2013; 15:45	3× (yellow card) 3× (suspension)	Report	3× (yellow card) 4× (suspension)	Palacio Municipal de Deportes San Pablo, Seville; Referees: Coulibaly, Diabaté (CIV)

12 January 2013; 18:00	Iceland	25–30	Russia	Palacio Municipal de Deportes San Pablo, Seville; Referees: Horáček, Novotný (CZE)
12 January 2013; 18:00	Sigurðsson 7	(13–14)	Gorbok 6	Palacio Municipal de Deportes San Pablo, Seville; Referees: Horáček, Novotný (CZE)
12 January 2013; 18:00	2× (yellow card) 5× (suspension) 1× (red card)	Report	3× (yellow card) 3× (suspension)	Palacio Municipal de Deportes San Pablo, Seville; Referees: Horáček, Novotný (CZE)

12 January 2013; 20:15	Denmark	41–27	Qatar	Palacio Municipal de Deportes San Pablo, Seville; Referees: Nikolić, Stojković (SRB)
12 January 2013; 20:15	Eggert, Lindberg 8	(19–13)	Abdelhak, Al-Rayes 4	Palacio Municipal de Deportes San Pablo, Seville; Referees: Nikolić, Stojković (SRB)
12 January 2013; 20:15	3× (yellow card) 4× (suspension)	Report	3× (yellow card) 5× (suspension)	Palacio Municipal de Deportes San Pablo, Seville; Referees: Nikolić, Stojković (SRB)

13 January 2013; 15:45	Chile	22–38	Iceland	Palacio Municipal de Deportes San Pablo, Seville; Referees: Nikolić, Stojković (SRB)
13 January 2013; 15:45	Er. Feuchtmann 6	(11–18)	Gunnarsson 7	Palacio Municipal de Deportes San Pablo, Seville; Referees: Nikolić, Stojković (SRB)
13 January 2013; 15:45	3× (yellow card) 1× (suspension) 1× (red card)	Report	3× (yellow card) 6× (suspension)	Palacio Municipal de Deportes San Pablo, Seville; Referees: Nikolić, Stojković (SRB)

13 January 2013; 18:00	Qatar	30–34	North Macedonia	Palacio Municipal de Deportes San Pablo, Seville; Referees: Caçador, Nicolau (POR)
13 January 2013; 18:00	Boumendjel, Osman 5	(13–21)	K. Lazarov 9	Palacio Municipal de Deportes San Pablo, Seville; Referees: Caçador, Nicolau (POR)
13 January 2013; 18:00	3× (yellow card) 4× (suspension)	Report	3× (yellow card) 5× (suspension)	Palacio Municipal de Deportes San Pablo, Seville; Referees: Caçador, Nicolau (POR)

13 January 2013; 20:15	Russia	27–31	Denmark	Palacio Municipal de Deportes San Pablo, Seville; Referees: Krstič, Ljubič (SLO)
13 January 2013; 20:15	Dibirov 7	(13–14)	Markussen 6	Palacio Municipal de Deportes San Pablo, Seville; Referees: Krstič, Ljubič (SLO)
13 January 2013; 20:15	2× (yellow card) 4× (suspension)	Report	3× (yellow card) 1× (suspension)	Palacio Municipal de Deportes San Pablo, Seville; Referees: Krstič, Ljubič (SLO)

15 January 2013; 15:45	Qatar	22–29	Russia	Palacio Municipal de Deportes San Pablo, Seville; Referees: Nikolić, Stojković (SRB)
15 January 2013; 15:45	Sinen 5	(13–16)	Dibirov 6	Palacio Municipal de Deportes San Pablo, Seville; Referees: Nikolić, Stojković (SRB)
15 January 2013; 15:45	2× (yellow card) 6× (suspension)	Report	3× (yellow card) 5× (suspension) 1× (red card)	Palacio Municipal de Deportes San Pablo, Seville; Referees: Nikolić, Stojković (SRB)

15 January 2013; 18:00	North Macedonia	19–23	Iceland	Palacio Municipal de Deportes San Pablo, Seville; Referees: Horáček, Novotný (CZE)
15 January 2013; 18:00	Manaskov 5	(10–10)	Sigurðsson 9	Palacio Municipal de Deportes San Pablo, Seville; Referees: Horáček, Novotný (CZE)
15 January 2013; 18:00	4× (yellow card) 3× (suspension)	Report	4× (yellow card) 3× (suspension)	Palacio Municipal de Deportes San Pablo, Seville; Referees: Horáček, Novotný (CZE)

15 January 2013; 20:15	Denmark	43–24	Chile	Palacio Municipal de Deportes San Pablo, Seville; Referees: Caçador, Nicolau (POR)
15 January 2013; 20:15	Eggert 9	(17–13)	Salinas 10	Palacio Municipal de Deportes San Pablo, Seville; Referees: Caçador, Nicolau (POR)
15 January 2013; 20:15	3× (yellow card) 4× (suspension)	Report	3× (yellow card) 5× (suspension)	Palacio Municipal de Deportes San Pablo, Seville; Referees: Caçador, Nicolau (POR)

16 January 2013; 15:45	North Macedonia	29–29	Russia	Palacio Municipal de Deportes San Pablo, Seville; Referees: Caçador, Nicolau (POR)
16 January 2013; 15:45	K. Lazarov 10	(13–16)	Dibirov 8	Palacio Municipal de Deportes San Pablo, Seville; Referees: Caçador, Nicolau (POR)
16 January 2013; 15:45	4× (yellow card) 3× (suspension)	Report	4× (yellow card) 6× (suspension) 1× (red card)	Palacio Municipal de Deportes San Pablo, Seville; Referees: Caçador, Nicolau (POR)

16 January 2013; 18:00	Chile	23–31	Qatar	Palacio Municipal de Deportes San Pablo, Seville; Referees: Coulibaly, Diabaté (CIV)
16 January 2013; 18:00	Salinas 7	(9–16)	Ben Aziza 8	Palacio Municipal de Deportes San Pablo, Seville; Referees: Coulibaly, Diabaté (CIV)
16 January 2013; 18:00	2× (yellow card) 4× (suspension)	Report	3× (yellow card) 6× (suspension)	Palacio Municipal de Deportes San Pablo, Seville; Referees: Coulibaly, Diabaté (CIV)

16 January 2013; 20:15	Iceland	28–36	Denmark	Palacio Municipal de Deportes San Pablo, Seville; Referees: Nikolić, Stojković (SRB)
16 January 2013; 20:15	Kristjánsson 8	(13–16)	three players 7	Palacio Municipal de Deportes San Pablo, Seville; Referees: Nikolić, Stojković (SRB)
16 January 2013; 20:15	3× (yellow card) 4× (suspension)	Report	3× (yellow card) 3× (suspension)	Palacio Municipal de Deportes San Pablo, Seville; Referees: Nikolić, Stojković (SRB)

18 January 2013; 15:45	Russia	36–24	Chile	Palacio Municipal de Deportes San Pablo, Seville; Referees: Caçador, Nicolau (POR)
18 January 2013; 15:45	Dibirov 11	(18–13)	Em. Feuchtmann 9	Palacio Municipal de Deportes San Pablo, Seville; Referees: Caçador, Nicolau (POR)
18 January 2013; 15:45	3× (yellow card) 6× (suspension)	Report	3× (yellow card) 4× (suspension)	Palacio Municipal de Deportes San Pablo, Seville; Referees: Caçador, Nicolau (POR)

18 January 2013; 18:00	Iceland	39–29	Qatar	Palacio Municipal de Deportes San Pablo, Seville; Referees: Horáček, Novotný (CZE)
18 January 2013; 18:00	Sigurðsson 10	(19–14)	Sinen 8	Palacio Municipal de Deportes San Pablo, Seville; Referees: Horáček, Novotný (CZE)
18 January 2013; 18:00	3× (yellow card) 5× (suspension)	Report	4× (yellow card) 2× (suspension)	Palacio Municipal de Deportes San Pablo, Seville; Referees: Horáček, Novotný (CZE)

18 January 2013; 20:15	Denmark	33–30	North Macedonia	Palacio Municipal de Deportes San Pablo, Seville; Referees: Coulibaly, Diabaté (CIV)
18 January 2013; 20:15	Hansen 5	(13–14)	K. Lazarov, F. Lazarov 5	Palacio Municipal de Deportes San Pablo, Seville; Referees: Coulibaly, Diabaté (CIV)
18 January 2013; 20:15	3× (yellow card) 2× (suspension)	Report	4× (yellow card) 4× (suspension)	Palacio Municipal de Deportes San Pablo, Seville; Referees: Coulibaly, Diabaté (CIV)

=== Group C ===
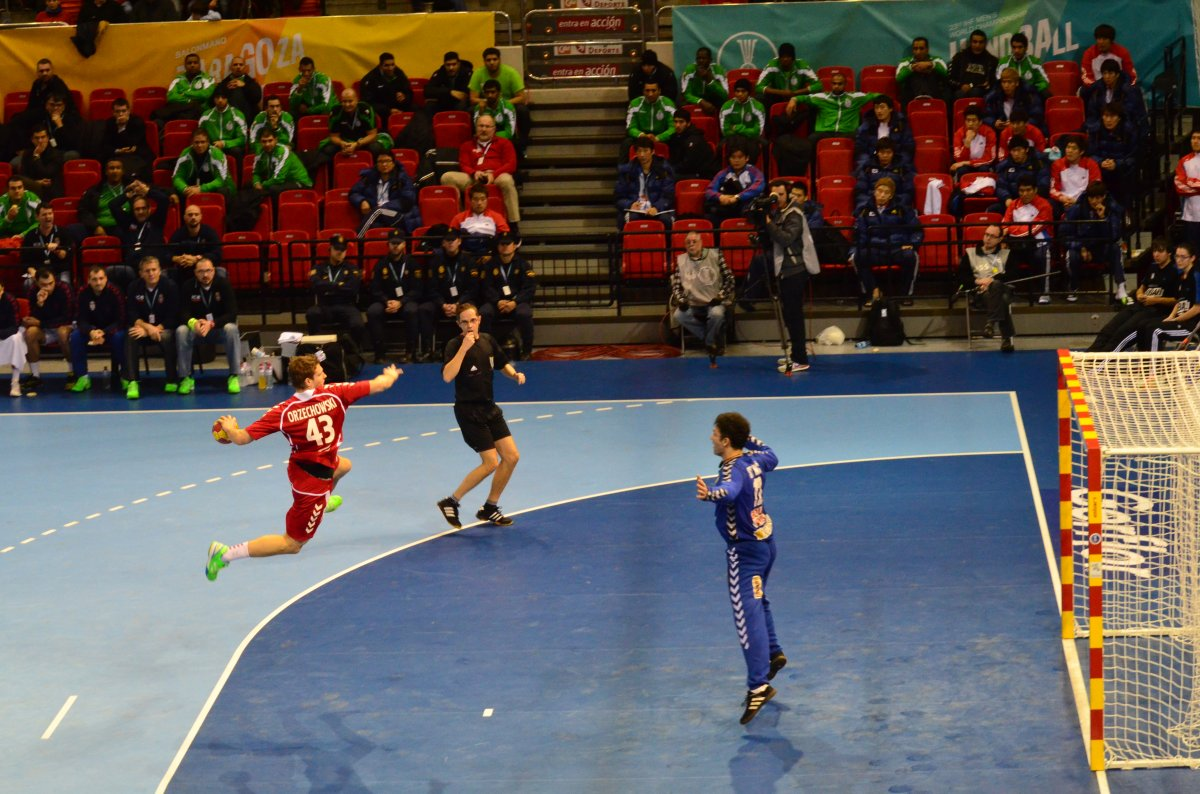
Robert Orzechowski takes a shot against Serbia

Team	Pld	W	D	L	GF	GA	GD	Pts
Slovenia	5	5	0	0	151	130	+21	10
Poland	5	4	0	1	134	110	+24	8
Serbia	5	3	0	2	150	128	+22	6
Belarus	5	2	0	3	135	120	+15	4
Saudi Arabia	5	1	0	4	95	145	−50	2
South Korea	5	0	0	5	116	148	−32	0

12 January 2013; 15:45	Serbia	31–22	South Korea	Pabellón Príncipe Felipe, Zaragoza; Referees: Ondogrecula, Baďura (SVK)
12 January 2013; 15:45	Ilić 7	(13–9)	Eom 6	Pabellón Príncipe Felipe, Zaragoza; Referees: Ondogrecula, Baďura (SVK)
12 January 2013; 15:45	3× (yellow card) 3× (suspension)	Report	2× (yellow card) 3× (suspension)	Pabellón Príncipe Felipe, Zaragoza; Referees: Ondogrecula, Baďura (SVK)

12 January 2013; 18:00	Slovenia	32–22	Saudi Arabia	Pabellón Príncipe Felipe, Zaragoza; Attendance: 3,000; Referees: Leifsson, Pálsson (ISL)
12 January 2013; 18:00	Marguč 6	(17–15)	Al-Obaidi, Al-Abdulali 5	Pabellón Príncipe Felipe, Zaragoza; Attendance: 3,000; Referees: Leifsson, Pálsson (ISL)
12 January 2013; 18:00	2× (yellow card) 6× (suspension)	Report	3× (yellow card) 8× (suspension) 1× (red card)	Pabellón Príncipe Felipe, Zaragoza; Attendance: 3,000; Referees: Leifsson, Pálsson (ISL)

12 January 2013; 20:15	Poland	24–22	Belarus	Pabellón Príncipe Felipe, Zaragoza; Attendance: 3,000; Referees: Stark, Ştefan (ROU)
12 January 2013; 20:15	Lijewski 7	(14–9)	Rutenka 9	Pabellón Príncipe Felipe, Zaragoza; Attendance: 3,000; Referees: Stark, Ştefan (ROU)
12 January 2013; 20:15	1× (yellow card) 2× (suspension)	Report	2× (yellow card) 4× (suspension)	Pabellón Príncipe Felipe, Zaragoza; Attendance: 3,000; Referees: Stark, Ştefan (ROU)

14 January 2013; 15:45	South Korea	27–34	Slovenia	Pabellón Príncipe Felipe, Zaragoza; Attendance: 500; Referees: Stark, Ştefan (ROU)
14 January 2013; 15:45	Kim, Jeong 6	(13–14)	Gajić 11	Pabellón Príncipe Felipe, Zaragoza; Attendance: 500; Referees: Stark, Ştefan (ROU)
14 January 2013; 15:45	3× (yellow card) 1× (suspension)	Report	3× (yellow card) 5× (suspension)	Pabellón Príncipe Felipe, Zaragoza; Attendance: 500; Referees: Stark, Ştefan (ROU)

14 January 2013; 18:00	Belarus	28–34	Serbia	Pabellón Príncipe Felipe, Zaragoza; Attendance: 1,000; Referees: Leifsson, Pálsson (ISL)
14 January 2013; 18:00	Rutenka 11	(13–20)	three players 5	Pabellón Príncipe Felipe, Zaragoza; Attendance: 1,000; Referees: Leifsson, Pálsson (ISL)
14 January 2013; 18:00	3× (yellow card) 6× (suspension)	Report	4× (yellow card) 5× (suspension)	Pabellón Príncipe Felipe, Zaragoza; Attendance: 1,000; Referees: Leifsson, Pálsson (ISL)

14 January 2013; 20:15	Saudi Arabia	14–28	Poland	Pabellón Príncipe Felipe, Zaragoza; Attendance: 1,000; Referees: Bamutref, Al-Suwaidi (QAT)
14 January 2013; 20:15	Al-Salem 4	(6–14)	Bartczak, Orzechowski 5	Pabellón Príncipe Felipe, Zaragoza; Attendance: 1,000; Referees: Bamutref, Al-Suwaidi (QAT)
14 January 2013; 20:15	3× (yellow card) 2× (suspension)	Report	2× (yellow card) 5× (suspension)	Pabellón Príncipe Felipe, Zaragoza; Attendance: 1,000; Referees: Bamutref, Al-Suwaidi (QAT)

15 January 2013; 15:45	South Korea	20–26	Belarus	Pabellón Príncipe Felipe, Zaragoza; Attendance: 400; Referees: Bamutref, Al-Suwaidi (QAT)
15 January 2013; 15:45	Eom 7	(10–12)	Rutenka 10	Pabellón Príncipe Felipe, Zaragoza; Attendance: 400; Referees: Bamutref, Al-Suwaidi (QAT)
15 January 2013; 15:45	3× (yellow card) 5× (suspension)	Report	3× (yellow card) 6× (suspension)	Pabellón Príncipe Felipe, Zaragoza; Attendance: 400; Referees: Bamutref, Al-Suwaidi (QAT)

15 January 2013; 18:00	Serbia	30–20	Saudi Arabia	Pabellón Príncipe Felipe, Zaragoza; Attendance: 700; Referees: Al-Marzouqi, Al-Nuaimi (UAE)
15 January 2013; 18:00	Ilić 8	(12–10)	Al-Abdulali 8	Pabellón Príncipe Felipe, Zaragoza; Attendance: 700; Referees: Al-Marzouqi, Al-Nuaimi (UAE)
15 January 2013; 18:00	4× (yellow card) 9× (suspension)	Report	3× (yellow card) 4× (suspension)	Pabellón Príncipe Felipe, Zaragoza; Attendance: 700; Referees: Al-Marzouqi, Al-Nuaimi (UAE)

15 January 2013; 20:15	Slovenia	25–24	Poland	Pabellón Príncipe Felipe, Zaragoza; Attendance: 1,500; Referees: Baďura, Ondogrecula (SVK)
15 January 2013; 20:15	Mačkovšek 8	(11–14)	Jurecki, Jurecki 5	Pabellón Príncipe Felipe, Zaragoza; Attendance: 1,500; Referees: Baďura, Ondogrecula (SVK)
15 January 2013; 20:15	4× (yellow card) 5× (suspension)	Report	4× (yellow card) 1× (suspension) 1× (red card)	Pabellón Príncipe Felipe, Zaragoza; Attendance: 1,500; Referees: Baďura, Ondogrecula (SVK)

17 January 2013; 15:45	Slovenia	27–26	Belarus	Pabellón Príncipe Felipe, Zaragoza; Attendance: 700; Referees: Stark, Ştefan (ROU)
17 January 2013; 15:45	Gajić 8	(12–17)	Rutenka 9	Pabellón Príncipe Felipe, Zaragoza; Attendance: 700; Referees: Stark, Ştefan (ROU)
17 January 2013; 15:45	3× (yellow card) 3× (suspension)	Report	2× (yellow card) 5× (suspension)	Pabellón Príncipe Felipe, Zaragoza; Attendance: 700; Referees: Stark, Ştefan (ROU)

17 January 2013; 18:00	Saudi Arabia	24–22	South Korea	Pabellón Príncipe Felipe, Zaragoza; Attendance: 1,200; Referees: Gubica, Milošević (CRO)
17 January 2013; 18:00	Al-Salem 5	(11–13)	Eom 6	Pabellón Príncipe Felipe, Zaragoza; Attendance: 1,200; Referees: Gubica, Milošević (CRO)
17 January 2013; 18:00	3× (yellow card) 4× (suspension)	Report	3× (yellow card) 4× (suspension)	Pabellón Príncipe Felipe, Zaragoza; Attendance: 1,200; Referees: Gubica, Milošević (CRO)

17 January 2013; 20:15	Poland	25–24	Serbia	Pabellón Príncipe Felipe, Zaragoza; Attendance: 2,500; Referees: Geipel, Helbig (GER)
17 January 2013; 20:15	Jurecki 9	(11–13)	Ilić 9	Pabellón Príncipe Felipe, Zaragoza; Attendance: 2,500; Referees: Geipel, Helbig (GER)
17 January 2013; 20:15	2× (yellow card) 3× (suspension)	Report	3× (yellow card) 5× (suspension) 1× (red card)	Pabellón Príncipe Felipe, Zaragoza; Attendance: 2,500; Referees: Geipel, Helbig (GER)

19 January 2013; 15:45	Belarus	33–15	Saudi Arabia	Pabellón Príncipe Felipe, Zaragoza; Attendance: 1,300; Referees: Geipel, Helbig (GER)
19 January 2013; 15:45	Shylovich 6	(18–5)	Al-Enbaawi 3	Pabellón Príncipe Felipe, Zaragoza; Attendance: 1,300; Referees: Geipel, Helbig (GER)
19 January 2013; 15:45	3× (yellow card)	Report	3× (yellow card)	Pabellón Príncipe Felipe, Zaragoza; Attendance: 1,300; Referees: Geipel, Helbig (GER)

19 January 2013; 18:00	Poland	33–25	South Korea	Pabellón Príncipe Felipe, Zaragoza; Attendance: 3,000; Referees: Menezes, Pinto (BRA)
19 January 2013; 18:00	Jurecki 10	(18–11)	Yoon 9	Pabellón Príncipe Felipe, Zaragoza; Attendance: 3,000; Referees: Menezes, Pinto (BRA)
19 January 2013; 18:00	2× (yellow card) 5× (suspension) 1× (red card)	Report	3× (yellow card) 5× (suspension)	Pabellón Príncipe Felipe, Zaragoza; Attendance: 3,000; Referees: Menezes, Pinto (BRA)

19 January 2013; 20:15	Serbia	31–33	Slovenia	Pabellón Príncipe Felipe, Zaragoza; Attendance: 4,000; Referees: Leifsson, Pálsson (ISL)
19 January 2013; 20:15	Vujin 7	(16–19)	Gajić 7	Pabellón Príncipe Felipe, Zaragoza; Attendance: 4,000; Referees: Leifsson, Pálsson (ISL)
19 January 2013; 20:15	4× (yellow card) 4× (suspension)	Report	4× (yellow card) 6× (suspension)	Pabellón Príncipe Felipe, Zaragoza; Attendance: 4,000; Referees: Leifsson, Pálsson (ISL)

=== Group D ===
Team	Pld	W	D	L	GF	GA	GD	Pts
Croatia	5	5	0	0	148	99	+49	10
Spain	5	4	0	1	160	98	+62	8
Hungary	5	3	0	2	147	120	+27	6
Egypt	5	1	1	3	130	123	+7	3
Algeria	5	1	1	3	123	126	−3	3
Australia	5	0	0	5	66	208	−142	0

Spain's 51–11 win over Australia has been the third highest scoring win at a world championship.

11 January 2013; 19:00	Spain	27–14	Algeria	Caja Mágica, Madrid; Attendance: 7,400; Referees: Geipel, Helbig (GER)
11 January 2013; 19:00	Tomás 8	(14–5)	Mokrani 5	Caja Mágica, Madrid; Attendance: 7,400; Referees: Geipel, Helbig (GER)
11 January 2013; 19:00	3× (yellow card) 4× (suspension)	Report	3× (yellow card) 5× (suspension)	Caja Mágica, Madrid; Attendance: 7,400; Referees: Geipel, Helbig (GER)

12 January 2013; 16:45	Croatia	36–13	Australia	Caja Mágica, Madrid; Attendance: 2,500; Referees: Menezes, Pinto (BRA)
12 January 2013; 16:45	Horvat 8	(17–4)	Fletcher 5	Caja Mágica, Madrid; Attendance: 2,500; Referees: Menezes, Pinto (BRA)
12 January 2013; 16:45	3× (yellow card) 2× (suspension)	Report	2× (yellow card) 6× (suspension) 1× (red card)	Caja Mágica, Madrid; Attendance: 2,500; Referees: Menezes, Pinto (BRA)

12 January 2013; 19:00	Hungary	32–23	Egypt	Caja Mágica, Madrid; Attendance: 2,500; Referees: Načevski, Nikolov (MKD)
12 January 2013; 19:00	Császár 8	(17–9)	Mostafa 5	Caja Mágica, Madrid; Attendance: 2,500; Referees: Načevski, Nikolov (MKD)
12 January 2013; 19:00	4× (yellow card) 3× (suspension)	Report	3× (yellow card) 5× (suspension)	Caja Mágica, Madrid; Attendance: 2,500; Referees: Načevski, Nikolov (MKD)

14 January 2013; 16:45	Algeria	20–31	Croatia	Caja Mágica, Madrid; Attendance: 1,500; Referees: Baďura, Ondogrecula (SVK)
14 January 2013; 16:45	Hichem 6	(12–15)	Čupić 8	Caja Mágica, Madrid; Attendance: 1,500; Referees: Baďura, Ondogrecula (SVK)
14 January 2013; 16:45	2× (yellow card) 4× (suspension)	Report	2× (yellow card) 2× (suspension)	Caja Mágica, Madrid; Attendance: 1,500; Referees: Baďura, Ondogrecula (SVK)

14 January 2013; 19:00	Egypt	24–29	Spain	Caja Mágica, Madrid; Attendance: 7,500; Referees: Krstič, Ljubič (SLO)
14 January 2013; 19:00	Mostafa 5	(11–16)	Rivera 6	Caja Mágica, Madrid; Attendance: 7,500; Referees: Krstič, Ljubič (SLO)
14 January 2013; 19:00	3× (yellow card) 3× (suspension)	Report	3× (yellow card) 5× (suspension)	Caja Mágica, Madrid; Attendance: 7,500; Referees: Krstič, Ljubič (SLO)

14 January 2013; 21:15	Australia	13–43	Hungary	Caja Mágica, Madrid; Attendance: 1,500; Referees: Geipel, Helbig (GER)
14 January 2013; 21:15	Fletcher 6	(6–20)	Császár 8	Caja Mágica, Madrid; Attendance: 1,500; Referees: Geipel, Helbig (GER)
14 January 2013; 21:15	3× (yellow card) 3× (suspension)	Report	2× (yellow card) 1× (suspension)	Caja Mágica, Madrid; Attendance: 1,500; Referees: Geipel, Helbig (GER)

15 January 2013; 16:45	Algeria	24–24	Egypt	Caja Mágica, Madrid; Attendance: 1,000; Referees: Coulibaly, Diabaté (CIV)
15 January 2013; 16:45	three players 5	(12–16)	Mostafa 9	Caja Mágica, Madrid; Attendance: 1,000; Referees: Coulibaly, Diabaté (CIV)
15 January 2013; 16:45	4× (yellow card) 2× (suspension)	Report	3× (yellow card) 7× (suspension)	Caja Mágica, Madrid; Attendance: 1,000; Referees: Coulibaly, Diabaté (CIV)

15 January 2013; 19:00	Spain	51–11	Australia	Caja Mágica, Madrid; Attendance: 4,500; Referees: Menezes, Pinto (BRA)
15 January 2013; 19:00	Rocas 9	(24–6)	Mouncey 4	Caja Mágica, Madrid; Attendance: 4,500; Referees: Menezes, Pinto (BRA)
15 January 2013; 19:00	2× (yellow card) 1× (suspension)	Report	3× (yellow card) 9× (suspension) 1× (red card)	Caja Mágica, Madrid; Attendance: 4,500; Referees: Menezes, Pinto (BRA)

15 January 2013; 21:15	Croatia	30–21	Hungary	Caja Mágica, Madrid; Attendance: 3,000; Referees: Geipel, Helbig (GER)
15 January 2013; 21:15	Čupić 8	(15–11)	Szöllősi 5	Caja Mágica, Madrid; Attendance: 3,000; Referees: Geipel, Helbig (GER)
15 January 2013; 21:15	4× (yellow card) 2× (suspension)	Report	3× (yellow card) 2× (suspension)	Caja Mágica, Madrid; Attendance: 3,000; Referees: Geipel, Helbig (GER)

17 January 2013; 16:45	Australia	15–39	Algeria	Caja Mágica, Madrid; Attendance: 1,000; Referees: Al-Suwaidi, Bamutref (QAT)
17 January 2013; 16:45	Calvert 6	(6–14)	Chehbour 6	Caja Mágica, Madrid; Attendance: 1,000; Referees: Al-Suwaidi, Bamutref (QAT)
17 January 2013; 16:45	3× (yellow card) 3× (suspension)	Report	2× (yellow card) 3× (suspension) 1× (red card)	Caja Mágica, Madrid; Attendance: 1,000; Referees: Al-Suwaidi, Bamutref (QAT)

17 January 2013; 19:00	Hungary	22–28	Spain	Caja Mágica, Madrid; Attendance: 10,500; Referees: Krstič, Ljubič (SLO)
17 January 2013; 19:00	Nagy 6	(14–14)	Tomás, Sarmiento 6	Caja Mágica, Madrid; Attendance: 10,500; Referees: Krstič, Ljubič (SLO)
17 January 2013; 19:00	3× (yellow card) 5× (suspension)	Report	4× (yellow card) 3× (suspension)	Caja Mágica, Madrid; Attendance: 10,500; Referees: Krstič, Ljubič (SLO)

17 January 2013; 21:15	Croatia	24–20	Egypt	Caja Mágica, Madrid; Attendance: 3,500; Referees: Načevski, Nikolov (MKD)
17 January 2013; 21:15	three players 4	(11–9)	Mostafa 8	Caja Mágica, Madrid; Attendance: 3,500; Referees: Načevski, Nikolov (MKD)
17 January 2013; 21:15	3× (yellow card) 4× (suspension)	Report	3× (yellow card) 5× (suspension)	Caja Mágica, Madrid; Attendance: 3,500; Referees: Načevski, Nikolov (MKD)

19 January 2013; 16:45	Egypt	39–14	Australia	Caja Mágica, Madrid; Attendance: 2,500; Referees: Krstič, Ljubič (SLO)
19 January 2013; 16:45	Hisham 7	(25–8)	Hedges 5	Caja Mágica, Madrid; Attendance: 2,500; Referees: Krstič, Ljubič (SLO)
19 January 2013; 16:45	3× (yellow card) 1× (suspension)	Report	3× (yellow card) 2× (suspension)	Caja Mágica, Madrid; Attendance: 2,500; Referees: Krstič, Ljubič (SLO)

19 January 2013; 19:00	Spain	25–27	Croatia	Caja Mágica, Madrid; Attendance: 10,000; Referees: Horáček, Novotný (CZE)
19 January 2013; 19:00	Maqueda 7	(13–15)	Čupić 8	Caja Mágica, Madrid; Attendance: 10,000; Referees: Horáček, Novotný (CZE)
19 January 2013; 19:00	3× (yellow card) 6× (suspension)	Report	3× (yellow card) 6× (suspension) 1× (red card)	Caja Mágica, Madrid; Attendance: 10,000; Referees: Horáček, Novotný (CZE)

19 January 2013; 21:15	Hungary	29–26	Algeria	Caja Mágica, Madrid; Attendance: 3,000; Referees: Načevski, Nikolov (MKD)
19 January 2013; 21:15	three players 5	(14–8)	Berkous 7	Caja Mágica, Madrid; Attendance: 3,000; Referees: Načevski, Nikolov (MKD)
19 January 2013; 21:15	3× (yellow card) 6× (suspension)	Report	3× (yellow card) 7× (suspension)	Caja Mágica, Madrid; Attendance: 3,000; Referees: Načevski, Nikolov (MKD)

== President's cup ==
=== 17–20th place ===
==== Bracket ====
17–20th place semifinals
Argentina	30
Qatar	26
Saudi Arabia	24
Algeria	28

17th place game
Argentina	23
Algeria	29
19th place game
Qatar	30
Saudi Arabia	33

==== Semifinals ====
21 January 2013; 13:15	Argentina	30–26	Qatar	Palacio Multiusos de Guadalajara, Guadalajara; Attendance: 1,000; Referees: Stark, Ştefan (ROU)
21 January 2013; 13:15	three players 5	(12–11)	Madadi 6	Palacio Multiusos de Guadalajara, Guadalajara; Attendance: 1,000; Referees: Stark, Ştefan (ROU)
21 January 2013; 13:15	3× (yellow card) 2× (suspension) 1× (red card)	Report	4× (yellow card) 8× (suspension) 1× (red card)	Palacio Multiusos de Guadalajara, Guadalajara; Attendance: 1,000; Referees: Stark, Ştefan (ROU)

21 January 2013; 15:30	Saudi Arabia	24–28	Algeria	Palacio Multiusos de Guadalajara, Guadalajara; Attendance: 500; Referees: Menezes, Pinto (BRA)
21 January 2013; 15:30	Al-Salem 7	(11–15)	Chehbour 7	Palacio Multiusos de Guadalajara, Guadalajara; Attendance: 500; Referees: Menezes, Pinto (BRA)
21 January 2013; 15:30	3× (yellow card) 4× (suspension)	Report	2× (yellow card) 3× (suspension)	Palacio Multiusos de Guadalajara, Guadalajara; Attendance: 500; Referees: Menezes, Pinto (BRA)

==== 19th place game ====
22 January 2013; 17:45	Qatar	30–33	Saudi Arabia	Palacio Multiusos de Guadalajara, Guadalajara; Attendance: 800; Referees: Coulibaly, Diabaté (CIV)
22 January 2013; 17:45	Mabrouk 8	(18–10)	Al-Obaidi 7	Palacio Multiusos de Guadalajara, Guadalajara; Attendance: 800; Referees: Coulibaly, Diabaté (CIV)
22 January 2013; 17:45	3× (yellow card) 4× (suspension)	Report	4× (yellow card) 6× (suspension)	Palacio Multiusos de Guadalajara, Guadalajara; Attendance: 800; Referees: Coulibaly, Diabaté (CIV)

==== 17th place game ====
22 January 2013; 20:00	Argentina	23–29	Algeria	Palacio Multiusos de Guadalajara, Guadalajara; Attendance: 1,000; Referees: Al-Marzouqi, Al-Nuaimi (UAE)
22 January 2013; 20:00	Pizarro, S. Simonet 5	(10–12)	Chehbour 7	Palacio Multiusos de Guadalajara, Guadalajara; Attendance: 1,000; Referees: Al-Marzouqi, Al-Nuaimi (UAE)
22 January 2013; 20:00	3× (yellow card) 2× (suspension)	Report	4× (yellow card) 8× (suspension)	Palacio Multiusos de Guadalajara, Guadalajara; Attendance: 1,000; Referees: Al-Marzouqi, Al-Nuaimi (UAE)

=== 21–24th place ===
==== Bracket ====
21–24th place semifinals
Montenegro	35
Chile	31
South Korea	36
Australia	14

21st place game
Montenegro	27
South Korea	30
23rd place game
Chile	32
Australia	23

==== Semifinals ====
21 January 2013; 17:45	Montenegro	35–31	Chile	Palacio Multiusos de Guadalajara, Guadalajara; Attendance: 500; Referees: Al-Marzouqi, Al-Nuaimi (UAE)
21 January 2013; 17:45	Roganović 9	(18–11)	Em. Feuchtmann 8	Palacio Multiusos de Guadalajara, Guadalajara; Attendance: 500; Referees: Al-Marzouqi, Al-Nuaimi (UAE)
21 January 2013; 17:45	3× (yellow card) 5× (suspension)	Report	2× (yellow card) 3× (suspension)	Palacio Multiusos de Guadalajara, Guadalajara; Attendance: 500; Referees: Al-Marzouqi, Al-Nuaimi (UAE)

21 January 2013; 20:00	South Korea	36–14	Australia	Palacio Multiusos de Guadalajara, Guadalajara; Attendance: 500; Referees: Al-Suwaidi, Bamutref (QAT)
21 January 2013; 20:00	Lee 7	(19–6)	Kelly 4	Palacio Multiusos de Guadalajara, Guadalajara; Attendance: 500; Referees: Al-Suwaidi, Bamutref (QAT)
21 January 2013; 20:00	2× (yellow card) 3× (suspension)	Report	3× (yellow card) 3× (suspension)	Palacio Multiusos de Guadalajara, Guadalajara; Attendance: 500; Referees: Al-Suwaidi, Bamutref (QAT)

==== 23rd place game ====
22 January 2013; 13:15	Chile	32–23	Australia	Palacio Multiusos de Guadalajara, Guadalajara; Attendance: 1,000; Referees: Menezes, Pinto (BRA)
22 January 2013; 13:15	Em. Feuchtmann, Martínez 6	(17–10)	Calvert 8	Palacio Multiusos de Guadalajara, Guadalajara; Attendance: 1,000; Referees: Menezes, Pinto (BRA)
22 January 2013; 13:15	3× (yellow card) 4× (suspension)	Report	3× (yellow card) 4× (suspension)	Palacio Multiusos de Guadalajara, Guadalajara; Attendance: 1,000; Referees: Menezes, Pinto (BRA)

==== 21st place game ====
22 January 2013; 15:30	Montenegro	27–30	South Korea	Palacio Multiusos de Guadalajara, Guadalajara; Attendance: 500; Referees: Al-Suwaidi, Bamutref (QAT)
22 January 2013; 15:30	Ševaljević 11	(13–12)	Jeong 8	Palacio Multiusos de Guadalajara, Guadalajara; Attendance: 500; Referees: Al-Suwaidi, Bamutref (QAT)
22 January 2013; 15:30	3× (yellow card) 5× (suspension)	Report	3× (yellow card) 1× (suspension)	Palacio Multiusos de Guadalajara, Guadalajara; Attendance: 500; Referees: Al-Suwaidi, Bamutref (QAT)

== Knockout stage ==
=== Bracket ===
Round of 16
B1	Denmark	30
A4	Tunisia	23
D3	Hungary	27
C2	Poland	19
B3	Iceland	28
A2	France	30
D1	Croatia	33
C4	Belarus	24
A1	Germany	28
B4	North Macedonia	23
C3	Serbia	20
D2	Spain	31
A3	Brazil	26
B2	Russia	27
C1	Slovenia	31
D4	Egypt	26

Quarterfinals
B1	Denmark	28
D3	Hungary	26
A2	France	23
D1	Croatia	30
A1	Germany	24
D2	Spain	28
B2	Russia	27
C1	Slovenia	28

Semifinals
B1	Denmark	30
D1	Croatia	24
D2	Spain	26
C1	Slovenia	22

Final
B1	Denmark	19
D2	Spain	35
Third place
D1	Croatia	31
C1	Slovenia	26

==== Round of 16 ====
20 January 2013; 15:45	Germany	28–23	North Macedonia	Palau Sant Jordi, Barcelona; Attendance: 6,000; Referees: Krstič, Ljubič (SLO)
20 January 2013; 15:45	Kneer 5	(13–9)	K. Lazarov 8	Palau Sant Jordi, Barcelona; Attendance: 6,000; Referees: Krstič, Ljubič (SLO)
20 January 2013; 15:45	4× (yellow card) 4× (suspension)	Report	3× (yellow card) 6× (suspension)	Palau Sant Jordi, Barcelona; Attendance: 6,000; Referees: Krstič, Ljubič (SLO)

20 January 2013; 17:30	Brazil	26–27	Russia	Pabellón Príncipe Felipe, Zaragoza; Attendance: 1,600; Referees: Leifsson, Pálsson (ISL)
20 January 2013; 17:30	Teixeira, Ribeiro 6	(14–14)	Gorbok 11	Pabellón Príncipe Felipe, Zaragoza; Attendance: 1,600; Referees: Leifsson, Pálsson (ISL)
20 January 2013; 17:30	3× (yellow card) 3× (suspension) 1× (red card)	Report	3× (yellow card) 3× (suspension)	Pabellón Príncipe Felipe, Zaragoza; Attendance: 1,600; Referees: Leifsson, Pálsson (ISL)

20 January 2013; 20:15	Iceland	28–30	France	Palau Sant Jordi, Barcelona; Attendance: 7,000; Referees: Načevski, Nikolov (MKD)
20 January 2013; 20:15	Ólafsson 7	(14–15)	Honrubia 7	Palau Sant Jordi, Barcelona; Attendance: 7,000; Referees: Načevski, Nikolov (MKD)
20 January 2013; 20:15	3× (yellow card) 2× (suspension)	Report	3× (yellow card)	Palau Sant Jordi, Barcelona; Attendance: 7,000; Referees: Načevski, Nikolov (MKD)

20 January 2013; 20:15	Denmark	30–23	Tunisia	Pabellón Príncipe Felipe, Zaragoza; Attendance: 1,700; Referees: Gubica, Milošević (CRO)
20 January 2013; 20:15	Markussen 6	(16–11)	Boughanmi 5	Pabellón Príncipe Felipe, Zaragoza; Attendance: 1,700; Referees: Gubica, Milošević (CRO)
20 January 2013; 20:15	2× (yellow card) 4× (suspension)	Report	4× (yellow card) 7× (suspension)	Pabellón Príncipe Felipe, Zaragoza; Attendance: 1,700; Referees: Gubica, Milošević (CRO)

21 January 2013; 19:00	Slovenia	31–26	Egypt	Palau Sant Jordi, Barcelona; Attendance: 3,000; Referees: Baďura, Ondogrecula (SVK)
21 January 2013; 19:00	Dolenec 6	(19–11)	Mostafa 10	Palau Sant Jordi, Barcelona; Attendance: 3,000; Referees: Baďura, Ondogrecula (SVK)
21 January 2013; 19:00	4× (yellow card) 5× (suspension)	Report	3× (yellow card) 3× (suspension)	Palau Sant Jordi, Barcelona; Attendance: 3,000; Referees: Baďura, Ondogrecula (SVK)

21 January 2013; 19:00	Serbia	20–31	Spain	Pabellón Príncipe Felipe, Zaragoza; Attendance: 9,400; Referees: Horáček, Novotný (CZE)
21 January 2013; 19:00	Nenadić 4	(12–20)	Rocas 7	Pabellón Príncipe Felipe, Zaragoza; Attendance: 9,400; Referees: Horáček, Novotný (CZE)
21 January 2013; 19:00	4× (yellow card) 5× (suspension) 1× (red card)	Report	4× (yellow card) 3× (suspension) 1× (red card)	Pabellón Príncipe Felipe, Zaragoza; Attendance: 9,400; Referees: Horáček, Novotný (CZE)

21 January 2013; 21:30	Hungary	27–19	Poland	Palau Sant Jordi, Barcelona; Referees: Geipel, Helbig (GER)
21 January 2013; 21:30	Iváncsik 6	(10–9)	Jurecki 5	Palau Sant Jordi, Barcelona; Referees: Geipel, Helbig (GER)
21 January 2013; 21:30	3× (yellow card) 2× (suspension)	Report	3× (yellow card) 2× (suspension)	Palau Sant Jordi, Barcelona; Referees: Geipel, Helbig (GER)

21 January 2013; 21:30	Croatia	33–24	Belarus	Pabellón Príncipe Felipe, Zaragoza; Attendance: 5,600; Referees: Caçador, Nicolau (POR)
21 January 2013; 21:30	Stepančić 6	(21–9)	four players 4	Pabellón Príncipe Felipe, Zaragoza; Attendance: 5,600; Referees: Caçador, Nicolau (POR)
21 January 2013; 21:30	3× (yellow card) 2× (suspension)	Report	2× (yellow card) 2× (suspension)	Pabellón Príncipe Felipe, Zaragoza; Attendance: 5,600; Referees: Caçador, Nicolau (POR)

==== Quarterfinals ====
23 January 2013; 18:15	Russia	27–28	Slovenia	Palau Sant Jordi, Barcelona; Referees: Geipel, Helbig (GER)
23 January 2013; 18:15	Dibirov, Shelmenko 6	(13–14)	Žvižej, Zorman 5	Palau Sant Jordi, Barcelona; Referees: Geipel, Helbig (GER)
23 January 2013; 18:15	4× (yellow card) 11× (suspension) 3× (red card)	Report	3× (yellow card) 5× (suspension)	Palau Sant Jordi, Barcelona; Referees: Geipel, Helbig (GER)

23 January 2013; 19:00	Spain	28–24	Germany	Pabellón Príncipe Felipe, Zaragoza; Attendance: 10,600; Referees: Gubica, Milošević (CRO)
23 January 2013; 19:00	Aguinagalde, Tomás 7	(12–14)	Christophersen 6	Pabellón Príncipe Felipe, Zaragoza; Attendance: 10,600; Referees: Gubica, Milošević (CRO)
23 January 2013; 19:00	2× (yellow card) 4× (suspension)	Report	3× (yellow card) 7× (suspension)	Pabellón Príncipe Felipe, Zaragoza; Attendance: 10,600; Referees: Gubica, Milošević (CRO)

23 January 2013; 20:45	Denmark	28–26	Hungary	Palau Sant Jordi, Barcelona; Attendance: 8,000; Referees: Krstič, Ljubič (SLO)
23 January 2013; 20:45	Lindberg 10	(18–11)	Nagy 8	Palau Sant Jordi, Barcelona; Attendance: 8,000; Referees: Krstič, Ljubič (SLO)
23 January 2013; 20:45	3× (yellow card) 6× (suspension)	Report	4× (yellow card) 3× (suspension)	Palau Sant Jordi, Barcelona; Attendance: 8,000; Referees: Krstič, Ljubič (SLO)

23 January 2013; 21:30	France	23–30	Croatia	Pabellón Príncipe Felipe, Zaragoza; Attendance: 7,500; Referees: Raluy, Sabroso (ESP)
23 January 2013; 21:30	Sorhaindo 5	(12–13)	Duvnjak 9	Pabellón Príncipe Felipe, Zaragoza; Attendance: 7,500; Referees: Raluy, Sabroso (ESP)
23 January 2013; 21:30	4× (yellow card) 3× (suspension)	Report	4× (yellow card) 3× (suspension) 1× (red card)	Pabellón Príncipe Felipe, Zaragoza; Attendance: 7,500; Referees: Raluy, Sabroso (ESP)

==== Semifinals ====
25 January 2013; 19:15	Spain	26–22	Slovenia	Palau Sant Jordi, Barcelona; Referees: Leifsson, Pálsson (ISL)
25 January 2013; 19:15	Cañellas 5	(13–12)	Marguč 7	Palau Sant Jordi, Barcelona; Referees: Leifsson, Pálsson (ISL)
25 January 2013; 19:15	3× (yellow card) 2× (suspension)	Report	4× (yellow card) 3× (suspension)	Palau Sant Jordi, Barcelona; Referees: Leifsson, Pálsson (ISL)

25 January 2013; 21:30	Denmark	30–24	Croatia	Palau Sant Jordi, Barcelona; Referees: Horáček, Novotný (CZE)
25 January 2013; 21:30	Eggert 9	(14–11)	Bičanić 6	Palau Sant Jordi, Barcelona; Referees: Horáček, Novotný (CZE)
25 January 2013; 21:30	3× (yellow card) 3× (suspension)	Report	3× (yellow card) 2× (suspension)	Palau Sant Jordi, Barcelona; Referees: Horáček, Novotný (CZE)

==== Third place game ====
26 January 2013; 19:00	Slovenia	26–31	Croatia	Palau Sant Jordi, Barcelona; Attendance: 8,500; Referees: Načevski, Nikolov (MKD)
26 January 2013; 19:00	Kavtičnik 4	(13–14)	Duvnjak, Čupić 8	Palau Sant Jordi, Barcelona; Attendance: 8,500; Referees: Načevski, Nikolov (MKD)
26 January 2013; 19:00	4× (yellow card) 2× (suspension) 1× (red card)	Report	3× (yellow card) 4× (suspension)	Palau Sant Jordi, Barcelona; Attendance: 8,500; Referees: Načevski, Nikolov (MKD)

==== Final ====
The final match, watched by 19,500 people, was played at the Palau Sant Jordi hall in Barcelona. Denmark entered the final as the only unbeaten team during the tournament, having won all eight matches they previously played. Host nation Spain won seven of their eight matches before the final, losing only to Croatia in the final match in the group phase.

Spain won their second World Men's Handball Championship, beating Denmark 35–19. While in the early minutes of the game the teams were closely matched, Spain played tough defense, limited Denmark's scoring chances and went on a scoring run to end the first half leading 18–10. The Spanish team then increased their lead in the second half, outscoring Denmark 17–9 to close out the game. It was the third World Championship final that Denmark lost, having also been defeated in 1967 and 2011.

27 January 2013; 17:15	Spain	35–19	Denmark	Palau Sant Jordi, Barcelona; Attendance: 19,600; Referees: Krstič, Ljubič (SLO)
27 January 2013; 17:15	Cañellas 7	(18–10)	Søndergaard, Møllgaard 4	Palau Sant Jordi, Barcelona; Attendance: 19,600; Referees: Krstič, Ljubič (SLO)
27 January 2013; 17:15	3× (yellow card) 3× (suspension)	Report	3× (yellow card) 2× (suspension)	Palau Sant Jordi, Barcelona; Attendance: 19,600; Referees: Krstič, Ljubič (SLO)

== Statistics ==
=== Final ranking ===
Rank	Team
1st place, gold medalist(s)	Spain
2nd place, silver medalist(s)	Denmark
3rd place, bronze medalist(s)	Croatia
4	Slovenia
5	Germany
6	France
7	Russia
8	Hungary
9	Poland
10	Serbia
11	Tunisia
12	Iceland
13	Brazil
14	North Macedonia
15	Belarus
16	Egypt
17	Algeria
18	Argentina
19	Saudi Arabia
20	Qatar
21	South Korea
22	Montenegro
23	Chile
24	Australia

Teams 9 to 16 and 5 to 8 are ranked first by points, then by goal difference, then by plus goals from the preliminary round games against teams placed 1 to 4.

2013 Men's World Champions

Spain
Second title

Team roster

Arpad Sterbik, José Manuel Sierra, Alberto Entrerríos, Albert Rocas, Jorge Maqueda, Víctor Tomás, Dani Sarmiento, Julen Aguinagalde, Joan Cañellas, Ángel Montoro, Viran Morros, Carlos Ruesga, Antonio García, Valero Rivera, Aitor Ariño, Gedeón Guardiola.
Head coach: Valero Rivera.

=== All-Star Team ===
All-Star Team of the tournament:

- Goalkeeper: Niklas Landin Jacobsen (DEN)
- Left wing: Timur Dibirov (RUS)
- Left back: Alberto Entrerríos (ESP)
- Centre back: Domagoj Duvnjak (CRO)
- Pivot: Julen Aguinagalde (ESP)
- Right back: László Nagy (HUN)
- Right wing: Hans Lindberg (DEN)

=== Other awards ===
- Most Valuable Player: Mikkel Hansen (DEN)

=== Top goalscorers ===
Rank	Name	Team	Goals	Shots	%	Matches Played
1	Anders Eggert	Denmark	55	65	85%	9
2	Ivan Čupić	Croatia	50	70	71%	9
3	Timur Dibirov	Russia	46	68	67%	7
4	Siarhei Rutenka	Belarus	46	69	66%	6
5	Kiril Lazarov	North Macedonia	44	75	58%	6
6	Ahmed El-Ahmar	Egypt	42	77	54%	6
7	Guðjón Valur Sigurðsson	Iceland	41	70	58%	6
8	Domagoj Duvnjak	Croatia	41	72	57%	9
9	Emil Feuchtmann	Chile	40	65	61%	7
10	Jure Dolenec	Slovenia	39	51	76%	9

Source: IHF.info, 26 January 2013

=== Top goalkeepers ===
Rank	Name	Team	%	Saves	Shots
1	Marcin Wichary	Poland	47%	34	73
2	Karim Mostafa	Egypt	44%	22	50
3	Péter Tatai	Hungary	43%	46	106
4	Vadim Bogdanov	Russia	40%	35	88
5	José Manuel Sierra	Spain	39%	33	84
6	Primož Prošt	Slovenia	39%	56	143
7	Roland Mikler	Hungary	38%	67	174
8	Lee Dong-Myung	South Korea	38%	34	89
9	Filip Ivić	Croatia	38%	19	50
10	Carsten Lichtlein	Germany	38%	17	45

Source: IHF.info
