= Ahmed Abdelhak =

Qatari handball player (born 1988)

Personal information
- Nationality: Qatari
- Born: 14 February 1988 (age 38)
- Height: 1.85 m (6 ft 1 in)

Sport
- Sport: Handball
- Position: Right back
- Current club: Al-Gharafa
National team
Years	Team	Apps	(Gls)
–	Qatar	7	(17)
Medal record
Asian Championship
Gold medal – first place	2024 Bahrain

Ahmed Abdelhak (born 14 February 1988) is a Qatari handball player for Al-Gharafa and the Qatari national team.

He participated at the 2017 World Men's Handball Championship.
