= Bartosz Konitz =

Polish handball player (born 1984)

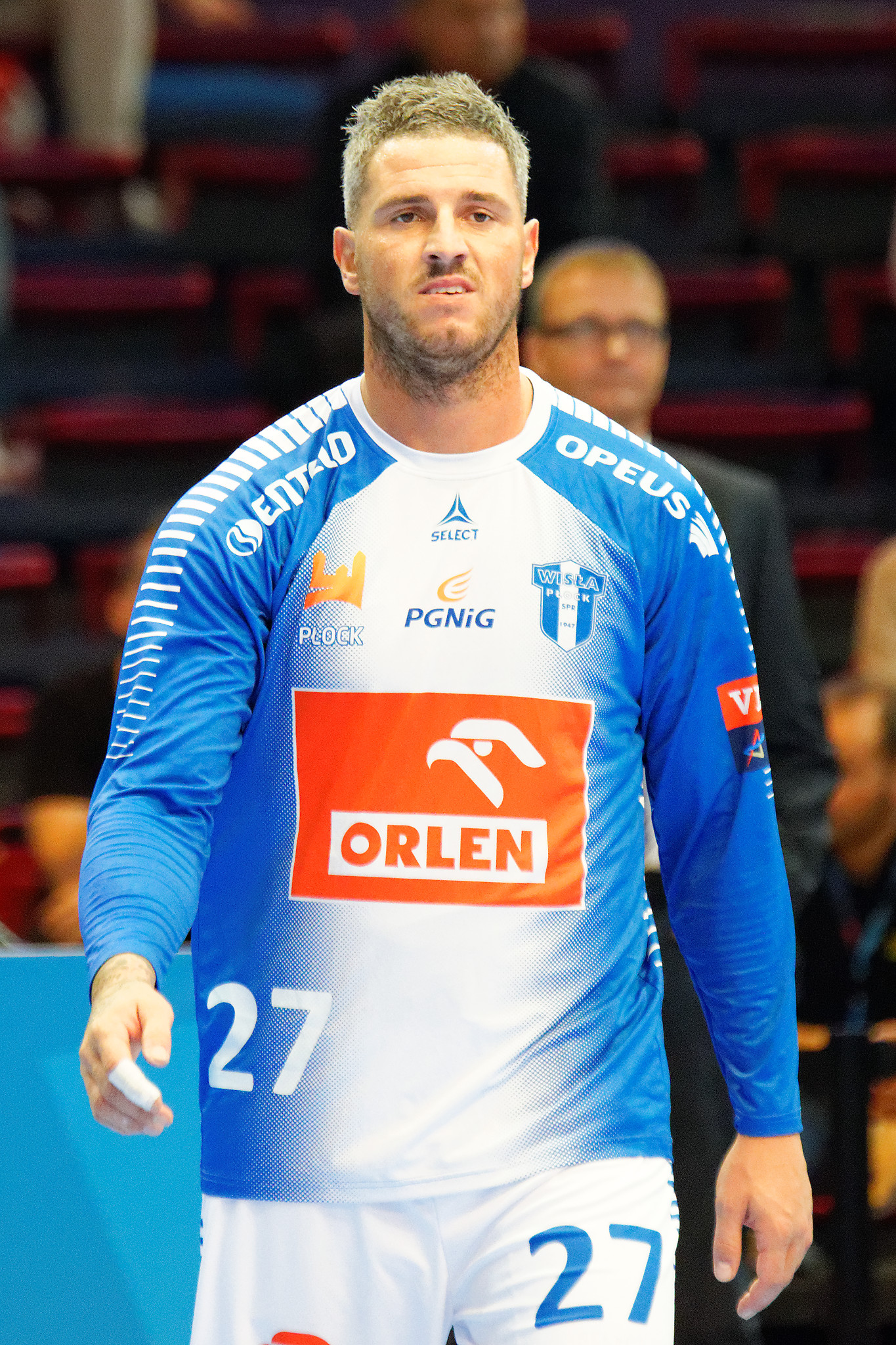

Personal information
- Nationality: Polish
- Born: 30 December 1984 (age 41) Oborniki, Poland
- Height: 1.95 m (6 ft 5 in)

Sport
- Sport: Handball
- Position: Centre back
- Current club: Wilhelmshavener HV
- Number: 27
National team
Years	Team	Apps	(Gls)
2003–2012	Netherlands	71	(213)
2014–2016	Poland	12	(11)

Bartosz Konitz (born 30 December 1984) is a Polish handball player. He plays for Wilhelmshavener HV and the Polish national team.

He competed at the 2016 European Men's Handball Championship.
