= Tiago Rocha =

Portuguese footballer

Personal information
- Full name: Tiago Rafael Moreira da Rocha
- Date of birth: 4 September 1990 (age 36)
- Place of birth: Penafiel, Portugal
- Height: 1.81 m (5 ft 11 in)
- Position: Goalkeeper

Team information
- Current team: Vila Meã
- Number: 30

Youth career
- 2000−2009: Penafiel

Senior career*
Years	Team	Apps	(Gls)
2009–2019	Penafiel	10	(0)
2019–	Vila Meã	18	(0)
- * Club domestic league appearances and goals as of 21:36, 22 April 2020 (UTC)

Tiago Rafael Moreira da Rocha (born 4 September 1990) is a Portuguese professional footballer who plays for Vila Meã as a goalkeeper.
