= 2016 European Men's Handball Championship qualification =

This article describes the qualification for the 2016 European Men's Handball Championship.

== Qualification system ==
38 teams have registered for participation. 38 teams competed for 15 places at the final tournament in 2 distinct Qualification Phases. In each phase, the teams were divided into several pots according to their positions in the EHF National Team Ranking.

== Qualification Phase 1 ==
The draw for the qualification round was held on the 23 June 2012 at the EHF Congress, in Monte Carlo, Monaco. The games were played in a home and away series, with every team playing each other twice. The group winners advanced to the second phase.

=== Seeding ===
Pot 1	Pot 2	Pot 3
Greece; Estonia; Finland	Italy; Cyprus; Belgium	Luxembourg; Great Britain; Ireland

=== Group 1 ===
Pos	Team	Pld	W	D	L	GF	GA	GD	Pts	Qualification
1	Finland	4	3	1	0	113	83	+30	7	Playoffs
2	Luxembourg	4	1	1	2	97	91	+6	3	
3	Cyprus	4	1	0	3	77	113	−36	2	

31 October 2012; 19:00	Finland	28 – 21	Luxembourg	Sisu Arena, Karis; Attendance: 903; Referees: Cvetko, Kavalar (SLO)
31 October 2012; 19:00	Rönnberg 10	(12–11)	Muller 5	Sisu Arena, Karis; Attendance: 903; Referees: Cvetko, Kavalar (SLO)
31 October 2012; 19:00	3× (yellow card) 3× (suspension)	Report	3× (yellow card) 3× (suspension)	Sisu Arena, Karis; Attendance: 903; Referees: Cvetko, Kavalar (SLO)

4 November 2012; 18:00	Cyprus	21 – 26	Finland	University of Cyprus Athletic Center, Nicosia; Attendance: 300; Referees: Aghakishi, Aghakishi (AZE)
4 November 2012; 18:00	Argyrou 7	(7–13)	Valo 6	University of Cyprus Athletic Center, Nicosia; Attendance: 300; Referees: Aghakishi, Aghakishi (AZE)
4 November 2012; 18:00	3× (yellow card) 5× (suspension)	Report	3× (yellow card) 5× (suspension)	University of Cyprus Athletic Center, Nicosia; Attendance: 300; Referees: Aghakishi, Aghakishi (AZE)

3 April 2013; 19:30	Luxembourg	16 – 17	Cyprus	D'Coque, Luxembourg City; Attendance: 500; Referees: Rutkovskis, Dzerve (LAT)
3 April 2013; 19:30	Sarac 5	(7–9)	Argyrou 3	D'Coque, Luxembourg City; Attendance: 500; Referees: Rutkovskis, Dzerve (LAT)
3 April 2013; 19:30	2× (yellow card) 1× (suspension)	Report	2× (yellow card) 3× (suspension)	D'Coque, Luxembourg City; Attendance: 500; Referees: Rutkovskis, Dzerve (LAT)

6 April 2013; 17:00	Luxembourg	24 – 24	Finland	D'Coque, Luxembourg City; Attendance: 1,300; Referees: Tzaferopoulos, Bethmann (GRE)
6 April 2013; 17:00	Muller 8	(9–14)	Tamminen 5	D'Coque, Luxembourg City; Attendance: 1,300; Referees: Tzaferopoulos, Bethmann (GRE)
6 April 2013; 17:00	3× (yellow card) 2× (suspension)	Report	3× (yellow card) 3× (suspension)	D'Coque, Luxembourg City; Attendance: 1,300; Referees: Tzaferopoulos, Bethmann (GRE)

12 June 2013; 20:00	Cyprus	22 – 36	Luxembourg	University of Cyprus Athletic Center, Nicosia; Attendance: 500; Referees: Di Domenico, Fornasier (ITA)
12 June 2013; 20:00	Argyrou 9	(15–17)	Poeckes 6	University of Cyprus Athletic Center, Nicosia; Attendance: 500; Referees: Di Domenico, Fornasier (ITA)
12 June 2013; 20:00	3× (yellow card) 3× (suspension)	Report	3× (yellow card) 5× (suspension)	University of Cyprus Athletic Center, Nicosia; Attendance: 500; Referees: Di Domenico, Fornasier (ITA)

15 June 2013; 17:30	Finland	35 – 17	Cyprus	Varuboden Areena, Kirkkonummi; Attendance: 713; Referees: Bounouara, Sami (FRA)
15 June 2013; 17:30	Tamminen 10	(19–6)	Constantinou, Nikiforou 4	Varuboden Areena, Kirkkonummi; Attendance: 713; Referees: Bounouara, Sami (FRA)
15 June 2013; 17:30	3× (yellow card) 5× (suspension)	Report	3× (yellow card) 6× (suspension)	Varuboden Areena, Kirkkonummi; Attendance: 713; Referees: Bounouara, Sami (FRA)

=== Group 2 ===
Pos	Team	Pld	W	D	L	GF	GA	GD	Pts	Qualification
1	Greece	4	4	0	0	135	86	+49	8	Playoffs
2	Italy	4	2	0	2	136	109	+27	4	
3	Great Britain	4	0	0	4	83	159	−76	0	

31 October 2012; 17:30	Greece	43 – 14	Great Britain	Stadium Georgios Galanopoulos, Loutraki; Attendance: 1,200; Referees: Martens, Verdonck (BEL)
31 October 2012; 17:30	Karypidis 7	(17–8)	Vincent 5	Stadium Georgios Galanopoulos, Loutraki; Attendance: 1,200; Referees: Martens, Verdonck (BEL)
31 October 2012; 17:30	3× (yellow card) 3× (suspension)	Report	3× (yellow card) 2× (suspension) 1× (red card)	Stadium Georgios Galanopoulos, Loutraki; Attendance: 1,200; Referees: Martens, Verdonck (BEL)

3 November 2012; 20:00	Italy	25 – 31	Greece	Palalavis, Lavis; Attendance: 1,100; Referees: Cindrić, Gonzurek (CRO)
3 November 2012; 20:00	Skatar 8	(17–14)	Sanikis 8	Palalavis, Lavis; Attendance: 1,100; Referees: Cindrić, Gonzurek (CRO)
3 November 2012; 20:00	3× (yellow card) 3× (suspension)	Report	3× (yellow card) 4× (suspension)	Palalavis, Lavis; Attendance: 1,100; Referees: Cindrić, Gonzurek (CRO)

4 April 2013; 19:00	Great Britain	23 – 47	Italy	Ravenscraig Regional Sports Facility, Motherwell; Attendance: 450; Referees: Sigurjónsson, Petursson (ISL)
4 April 2013; 19:00	Larsson 7	(13–24)	Skatar 9	Ravenscraig Regional Sports Facility, Motherwell; Attendance: 450; Referees: Sigurjónsson, Petursson (ISL)
4 April 2013; 19:00	2× (yellow card) 2× (suspension)	Report	2× (yellow card) 2× (suspension)	Ravenscraig Regional Sports Facility, Motherwell; Attendance: 450; Referees: Sigurjónsson, Petursson (ISL)

7 April 2013; 15:00	Great Britain	20 – 32	Greece	Crystal Palace National Sports Centre, London; Attendance: 600; Referees: Jaskins, Zabko (LAT)
7 April 2013; 15:00	Larsson 10	(12–16)	Papadopoulos 7	Crystal Palace National Sports Centre, London; Attendance: 600; Referees: Jaskins, Zabko (LAT)
7 April 2013; 15:00	3× (yellow card) 1× (suspension)	Report	2× (yellow card) 6× (suspension)	Crystal Palace National Sports Centre, London; Attendance: 600; Referees: Jaskins, Zabko (LAT)

12 June 2013; 20:00	Italy	37 – 26	Great Britain	Palalavis, Lavis; Attendance: 600; Referees: Vitaku, Vitaku (Kosovo)
12 June 2013; 20:00	Radovcic 6	(18–13)	Larsson 8	Palalavis, Lavis; Attendance: 600; Referees: Vitaku, Vitaku (Kosovo)
12 June 2013; 20:00	2× (yellow card) 3× (suspension)	Report	3× (yellow card) 2× (suspension)	Palalavis, Lavis; Attendance: 600; Referees: Vitaku, Vitaku (Kosovo)

15 June 2013; 19:00	Greece	29 – 27	Italy	Neapolis Arena, Larissa; Attendance: 1,500; Referees: Horváth, Márton (HUN)
15 June 2013; 19:00	Vasilakis 8	(16–13)	Maione 9	Neapolis Arena, Larissa; Attendance: 1,500; Referees: Horváth, Márton (HUN)
15 June 2013; 19:00	3× (yellow card) 4× (suspension)	Report	3× (yellow card) 4× (suspension)	Neapolis Arena, Larissa; Attendance: 1,500; Referees: Horváth, Márton (HUN)

=== Group 3 ===
Pos	Team	Pld	W	D	L	GF	GA	GD	Pts	Qualification
1	Estonia	4	4	0	0	152	75	+77	8	Playoffs
2	Belgium	4	2	0	2	111	87	+24	4	
3	Ireland	4	0	0	4	52	153	−101	0	

31 October 2012; 18:30	Estonia	44 – 13	Ireland	Kehra Sporthall, Kehra; Attendance: 550; Referees: Bol, van Eck (NED)
31 October 2012; 18:30	Peedomaa 7	(20–4)	Meyer 4	Kehra Sporthall, Kehra; Attendance: 550; Referees: Bol, van Eck (NED)
31 October 2012; 18:30	3× (yellow card) 3× (suspension)	Report	1× (yellow card) 3× (suspension)	Kehra Sporthall, Kehra; Attendance: 550; Referees: Bol, van Eck (NED)

3 November 2012; 20:30	Belgium	24 – 31	Estonia	Provinciaal Sportcentrum Dommelhof, Neerpelt; Attendance: 1,600; Referees: Martins, Martins (POR)
3 November 2012; 20:30	Houbrechts, Kopljar 5	(12–17)	Johannson 7	Provinciaal Sportcentrum Dommelhof, Neerpelt; Attendance: 1,600; Referees: Martins, Martins (POR)
3 November 2012; 20:30	3× (yellow card) 3× (suspension)	Report	2× (yellow card) 1× (suspension)	Provinciaal Sportcentrum Dommelhof, Neerpelt; Attendance: 1,600; Referees: Martins, Martins (POR)

4 April 2013; 19:00	Ireland	12 – 28	Belgium	University College Dublin, Dublin; Attendance: 250; Referees: Aghakishi, Aghakishi (AZE)
4 April 2013; 19:00	Meyer 5	(8–11)	Cauwenberghs 9	University College Dublin, Dublin; Attendance: 250; Referees: Aghakishi, Aghakishi (AZE)
4 April 2013; 19:00	3× (yellow card) 1× (suspension)	Report	3× (yellow card) 3× (suspension)	University College Dublin, Dublin; Attendance: 250; Referees: Aghakishi, Aghakishi (AZE)

6 April 2013; 14:00	Ireland	15 – 45	Estonia	University College Dublin, Dublin; Attendance: 260; Referees: Aghakishi, Aghakishi (AZE)
6 April 2013; 14:00	Ferguson 4	(6–21)	three players 5	University College Dublin, Dublin; Attendance: 260; Referees: Aghakishi, Aghakishi (AZE)
6 April 2013; 14:00	3× (yellow card) 2× (suspension)	Report	3× (yellow card) 4× (suspension)	University College Dublin, Dublin; Attendance: 260; Referees: Aghakishi, Aghakishi (AZE)

12 June 2013; 20:00	Belgium	36 – 12	Ireland	Hall de la C.E.T., Tournai; Attendance: 200; Referees: Freitas, Carvalho (POR)
12 June 2013; 20:00	Mathijs 8	(18–4)	Meyer 4	Hall de la C.E.T., Tournai; Attendance: 200; Referees: Freitas, Carvalho (POR)
12 June 2013; 20:00	3× (yellow card) 2× (suspension)	Report	3× (yellow card) 2× (suspension)	Hall de la C.E.T., Tournai; Attendance: 200; Referees: Freitas, Carvalho (POR)

16 June 2013; 18:00	Estonia	32 – 23	Belgium	Viljandi Sporthall, Viljandi; Attendance: 800; Referees: Novikov, Perepilitsy (UKR)
16 June 2013; 18:00	Patrail 8	(14–11)	Kopljar 7	Viljandi Sporthall, Viljandi; Attendance: 800; Referees: Novikov, Perepilitsy (UKR)
16 June 2013; 18:00	3× (yellow card) 4× (suspension)	Report	3× (yellow card) 3× (suspension)	Viljandi Sporthall, Viljandi; Attendance: 800; Referees: Novikov, Perepilitsy (UKR)

== Play-off ==
=== Seeding ===
The draw for phase 2 was held on the 27 June 2013, in Vienna, Austria. The three lowest ranked teams of the 2014 qualification are seeded in Pot 1 while the three group winners of Phase 1 are seeded in Pot 2.

Pot 1	Pot 2
Bosnia and Herzegovina; Romania; Switzerland	Estonia; Finland; Greece

=== Matches ===
Team 1	Agg.	Team 2	1st leg	2nd leg
Romania	61–62	Finland	32–30	29–32
Greece	45–55	Bosnia and Herzegovina	23–28	22–27
Estonia	58–65	Switzerland	26–34	32–31

==== First leg ====
2 April 2014; 19:00	Greece	23 – 28	Bosnia and Herzegovina	Mikras 3, Thessaloniki; Attendance: 600; Referees: Lorente, Serradilla (ESP)
2 April 2014; 19:00	Papadopoulos 9	(10–13)	Prce 5	Mikras 3, Thessaloniki; Attendance: 600; Referees: Lorente, Serradilla (ESP)
2 April 2014; 19:00	3× (yellow card) 3× (suspension)	Report	2× (yellow card) 4× (suspension)	Mikras 3, Thessaloniki; Attendance: 600; Referees: Lorente, Serradilla (ESP)

2 April 2014; 19:30	Romania	32 – 30	Finland	Concordia Sports Hall, Chiajna; Attendance: 850; Referees: Bol, Van Eck (NED)
2 April 2014; 19:30	Mihalcea 6	(16–14)	Rönnberg 8	Concordia Sports Hall, Chiajna; Attendance: 850; Referees: Bol, Van Eck (NED)
2 April 2014; 19:30	3× (yellow card) 3× (suspension)	Report	3× (yellow card) 5× (suspension)	Concordia Sports Hall, Chiajna; Attendance: 850; Referees: Bol, Van Eck (NED)

2 April 2014; 20:00	Estonia	26 – 34	Switzerland	Kalevi Spordihall, Tallinn; Attendance: 700; Referees: Kékes, Kékes (HUN)
2 April 2014; 20:00	Jaanimaa 6	(13–18)	three players 7	Kalevi Spordihall, Tallinn; Attendance: 700; Referees: Kékes, Kékes (HUN)
2 April 2014; 20:00	3× (yellow card) 9× (suspension) 1× (red card)	Report	2× (yellow card) 6× (suspension)	Kalevi Spordihall, Tallinn; Attendance: 700; Referees: Kékes, Kékes (HUN)

==== Second leg ====
4 April 2014; 20:00	Switzerland	31 – 32	Estonia	Kreuzbleichhalle, St. Gallen; Attendance: 2,250; Referees: Sigurjónsson, Pétursson (ISL)
4 April 2014; 20:00	Schmid 8	(16–14)	Patrail 7	Kreuzbleichhalle, St. Gallen; Attendance: 2,250; Referees: Sigurjónsson, Pétursson (ISL)
4 April 2014; 20:00	3× (yellow card) 5× (suspension)	Report	3× (yellow card) 3× (suspension)	Kreuzbleichhalle, St. Gallen; Attendance: 2,250; Referees: Sigurjónsson, Pétursson (ISL)

Switzerland won 65–58 on aggregate.

5 April 2014; 16:05	Finland	32 – 29	Romania	Sisu Arena, Karis; Attendance: 720; Referees: Hansen, Pettersen (NOR)
5 April 2014; 16:05	Tamminen 8	(15–13)	Ramba 9	Sisu Arena, Karis; Attendance: 720; Referees: Hansen, Pettersen (NOR)
5 April 2014; 16:05	3× (yellow card) 5× (suspension)	Report	3× (yellow card) 6× (suspension)	Sisu Arena, Karis; Attendance: 720; Referees: Hansen, Pettersen (NOR)

Finland won 62–61 on aggregate.

5 April 2014; 20:15	Bosnia and Herzegovina	27 – 22	Greece	JU Sportska dvorana Cazin, Cazin; Attendance: 2,500; Referees: Pichon, Reveret (FRA)
5 April 2014; 20:15	five players 4	(17–12)	Papadopoulos, Tziras 4	JU Sportska dvorana Cazin, Cazin; Attendance: 2,500; Referees: Pichon, Reveret (FRA)
5 April 2014; 20:15	5× (yellow card) 2× (suspension)	Report	3× (yellow card) 3× (suspension)	JU Sportska dvorana Cazin, Cazin; Attendance: 2,500; Referees: Pichon, Reveret (FRA)

Bosnia and Herzegovina won 55–45 on aggregate.

== Qualification Phase 2 ==
The draw was held on 11 April 2014. The teams were split into seven groups of four teams. The top two ranked teams from each group and the best third ranked team qualified for the final tournament.

=== Seeding ===
Pot 1	Pot 2	Pot 3	Pot 4
Denmark; Spain; Croatia; France; Serbia; Hungary; Slovenia	Iceland; Germany; Macedonia; Russia; Sweden; Belarus; Norway	Austria; Czech Republic; Montenegro; Slovakia; Lithuania; Portugal; Netherlands	Bosnia and Herzegovina; Israel; Latvia; Switzerland; Ukraine; Turkey; Finland

=== Group 1 ===
Pos	Team	Pld	W	D	L	GF	GA	GD	Pts	Qualification
1	Croatia	6	5	0	1	191	148	+43	10	Final tournament
2	Norway	6	5	0	1	182	152	+30	10	Final tournament
3	Netherlands	6	2	0	4	155	174	−19	4	
4	Turkey	6	0	0	6	141	195	−54	0	

29 October 2014; 19:00	Norway	36–27	Turkey	Braathallen, Kristiansund; Attendance: 2,769; Referees: Bernet, Wick (SUI)
29 October 2014; 19:00	Bjørnsen 11	(18–13)	Döne 13	Braathallen, Kristiansund; Attendance: 2,769; Referees: Bernet, Wick (SUI)
29 October 2014; 19:00	3× (yellow card) 3× (suspension)	Report	3× (yellow card) 3× (suspension)	Braathallen, Kristiansund; Attendance: 2,769; Referees: Bernet, Wick (SUI)

30 October 2014; 18:00	Croatia	35–24	Netherlands	Fran Galović, Koprivnica; Attendance: 2,500; Referees: Novikov, Perepilitsy (UKR)
30 October 2014; 18:00	Čupić, Slišković 6	(17–10)	Schagen 6	Fran Galović, Koprivnica; Attendance: 2,500; Referees: Novikov, Perepilitsy (UKR)
30 October 2014; 18:00	3× (yellow card) 3× (suspension)	Report	3× (yellow card) 3× (suspension)	Fran Galović, Koprivnica; Attendance: 2,500; Referees: Novikov, Perepilitsy (UKR)

2 November 2014; 14:00	Netherlands	22–30	Norway	Topsportcentrum, Almere; Attendance: 1,250; Referees: Fleisch, Rieber (GER)
2 November 2014; 14:00	Van Olphen 5	(9–13)	Jøndal, Bjørnsen 6	Topsportcentrum, Almere; Attendance: 1,250; Referees: Fleisch, Rieber (GER)
2 November 2014; 14:00	3× (yellow card) 5× (suspension) 1× (red card)	Report	3× (yellow card) 3× (suspension)	Topsportcentrum, Almere; Attendance: 1,250; Referees: Fleisch, Rieber (GER)

2 November 2014; 16:00	Turkey	22–32	Croatia	THF Sport Hall, Çankaya; Attendance: 800; Referees: Kurtagic, Wetterwik (SWE)
2 November 2014; 16:00	Döne 8	(9–16)	Kopljar, Čupić 6	THF Sport Hall, Çankaya; Attendance: 800; Referees: Kurtagic, Wetterwik (SWE)
2 November 2014; 16:00	1× (yellow card) 3× (suspension)	Report	3× (yellow card) 2× (suspension)	THF Sport Hall, Çankaya; Attendance: 800; Referees: Kurtagic, Wetterwik (SWE)

29 April 2015; 19:00	Turkey	23–30	Netherlands	THF Sport Hall, Çankaya; Attendance: 500; Referees: Konjičanin, Konjičanin (BIH)
29 April 2015; 19:00	Döne 11	(11–14)	Schagen 6	THF Sport Hall, Çankaya; Attendance: 500; Referees: Konjičanin, Konjičanin (BIH)
29 April 2015; 19:00	3× (yellow card) 2× (suspension)	Report	3× (yellow card) 4× (suspension)	THF Sport Hall, Çankaya; Attendance: 500; Referees: Konjičanin, Konjičanin (BIH)

29 April 2015; 19:10	Norway	27–26	Croatia	DNB Arena, Stavanger; Attendance: 4,750; Referees: Marín, García (ESP)
29 April 2015; 19:10	Hansen, Sagosen 5	(17–13)	Čupić 5	DNB Arena, Stavanger; Attendance: 4,750; Referees: Marín, García (ESP)
29 April 2015; 19:10	3× (yellow card) 4× (suspension) 1× (red card)	Report	3× (yellow card) 3× (suspension)	DNB Arena, Stavanger; Attendance: 4,750; Referees: Marín, García (ESP)

3 May 2015; 14:00	Netherlands	31–21	Turkey	Topsportcentrum, Almere; Attendance: 2,000; Referees: Vešović, Mitrović (MNE)
3 May 2015; 14:00	Boomhouwer, Haenen 6	(13–9)	Döne 5	Topsportcentrum, Almere; Attendance: 2,000; Referees: Vešović, Mitrović (MNE)
3 May 2015; 14:00	3× (yellow card) 6× (suspension)	Report	3× (yellow card) 4× (suspension)	Topsportcentrum, Almere; Attendance: 2,000; Referees: Vešović, Mitrović (MNE)

3 May 2015; 17:15	Croatia	31–25	Norway	Varaždin Arena, Varaždin; Attendance: 5,000; Referees: Dinu, Din (ROU)
3 May 2015; 17:15	Duvnjak, Horvat 7	(16–17)	three players 4	Varaždin Arena, Varaždin; Attendance: 5,000; Referees: Dinu, Din (ROU)
3 May 2015; 17:15	3× (yellow card) 5× (suspension)	Report	3× (yellow card) 7× (suspension) 1× (red card)	Varaždin Arena, Varaždin; Attendance: 5,000; Referees: Dinu, Din (ROU)

10 June 2015; 19:00	Turkey	22–26	Norway	THF Sport Hall, Çankaya; Attendance: 500; Referees: Covalciuc, Covalciuc (MDA)
10 June 2015; 19:00	Çalışkan 8	(10–12)	Kristensen 8	THF Sport Hall, Çankaya; Attendance: 500; Referees: Covalciuc, Covalciuc (MDA)
10 June 2015; 19:00	3× (yellow card) 4× (suspension)	Report	2× (yellow card) 3× (suspension)	THF Sport Hall, Çankaya; Attendance: 500; Referees: Covalciuc, Covalciuc (MDA)

10 June 2015; 20:00	Netherlands	24–27	Croatia	Fitland XL, Sittard; Attendance: 2,200; Referees: Dobrovits, Tájok (HUN)
10 June 2015; 20:00	Verjans 6	(12–14)	Horvat 7	Fitland XL, Sittard; Attendance: 2,200; Referees: Dobrovits, Tájok (HUN)
10 June 2015; 20:00	3× (yellow card) 4× (suspension)	Report	1× (yellow card) 1× (suspension)	Fitland XL, Sittard; Attendance: 2,200; Referees: Dobrovits, Tájok (HUN)

14 June 2015; 17:17	Croatia	40–26	Turkey	Školska sportska dvorana Umag, Umag; Attendance: 1,200; Referees: Argyridis, Mouttas (CYP)
14 June 2015; 17:17	Mihić, Stepančić 6	(21–13)	Çalışkan, Döne 5	Školska sportska dvorana Umag, Umag; Attendance: 1,200; Referees: Argyridis, Mouttas (CYP)
14 June 2015; 17:17	3× (yellow card) 2× (suspension)	Report	3× (yellow card) 3× (suspension)	Školska sportska dvorana Umag, Umag; Attendance: 1,200; Referees: Argyridis, Mouttas (CYP)

14 June 2015; 18:15	Norway	38–24	Netherlands	Trondheim Spektrum, Trondheim; Attendance: 3,151; Referees: Leszczynski, Piechota (POL)
14 June 2015; 18:15	Tønnesen 11	(19–11)	Haenen 7	Trondheim Spektrum, Trondheim; Attendance: 3,151; Referees: Leszczynski, Piechota (POL)
14 June 2015; 18:15	3× (yellow card) 3× (suspension)	Report	3× (yellow card) 2× (suspension)	Trondheim Spektrum, Trondheim; Attendance: 3,151; Referees: Leszczynski, Piechota (POL)

=== Group 2 ===
Pos	Team	Pld	W	D	L	GF	GA	GD	Pts	Qualification
1	Denmark	6	6	0	0	181	144	+37	12	Final tournament
2	Belarus	6	2	2	2	158	167	−9	6	Final tournament
3	Bosnia and Herzegovina	6	1	2	3	136	140	−4	4	
4	Lithuania	6	1	0	5	140	164	−24	2	

29 October 2014; 16:30	Belarus	25–25	Bosnia and Herzegovina	Chizhovka-Arena, Minsk; Attendance: 5,600; Referees: Horáček, Novotný (CZE)
29 October 2014; 16:30	Pukhouski 6	(12–13)	Vražalić 6	Chizhovka-Arena, Minsk; Attendance: 5,600; Referees: Horáček, Novotný (CZE)
29 October 2014; 16:30	3× (yellow card) 3× (suspension)	Report	3× (yellow card) 6× (suspension)	Chizhovka-Arena, Minsk; Attendance: 5,600; Referees: Horáček, Novotný (CZE)

30 October 2014; 20:15	Denmark	31–21	Lithuania	Brøndby Hall, Brøndby; Attendance: 4,016; Referees: Lah, Sok (SLO)
30 October 2014; 20:15	Hansen 7	(16–8)	Drabavičius 5	Brøndby Hall, Brøndby; Attendance: 4,016; Referees: Lah, Sok (SLO)
30 October 2014; 20:15	3× (yellow card) 1× (suspension)	Report	2× (yellow card) 2× (suspension)	Brøndby Hall, Brøndby; Attendance: 4,016; Referees: Lah, Sok (SLO)

2 November 2014; 16:00	Lithuania	28–30	Belarus	Šiauliai Arena, Šiauliai; Attendance: 500; Referees: Johansson, Kliko (SWE)
2 November 2014; 16:00	Malasinskas 9	(13–13)	Pukhouski 8	Šiauliai Arena, Šiauliai; Attendance: 500; Referees: Johansson, Kliko (SWE)
2 November 2014; 16:00	3× (yellow card) 3× (suspension)	Report	3× (yellow card) 3× (suspension) 1× (red card)	Šiauliai Arena, Šiauliai; Attendance: 500; Referees: Johansson, Kliko (SWE)

2 November 2014; 20:15	Bosnia and Herzegovina	23–25	Denmark	KSPC Mejdan, Tuzla; Attendance: 5,000; Referees: Santos, Fonseca (POR)
2 November 2014; 20:15	Toromanović 6	(11–12)	Møllgaard, Hansen 5	KSPC Mejdan, Tuzla; Attendance: 5,000; Referees: Santos, Fonseca (POR)
2 November 2014; 20:15	3× (yellow card) 3× (suspension)	Report	3× (yellow card) 1× (suspension)	KSPC Mejdan, Tuzla; Attendance: 5,000; Referees: Santos, Fonseca (POR)

30 April 2015; 19:00	Belarus	27–36	Denmark	Chizhovka-Arena, Minsk; Attendance: 6,500; Referees: Pavićević, Ražnatović (MNE)
30 April 2015; 19:00	S. Rutenka 10	(12–17)	Mortensen 9	Chizhovka-Arena, Minsk; Attendance: 6,500; Referees: Pavićević, Ražnatović (MNE)
30 April 2015; 19:00	3× (yellow card) 4× (suspension)	Report	3× (yellow card) 3× (suspension)	Chizhovka-Arena, Minsk; Attendance: 6,500; Referees: Pavićević, Ražnatović (MNE)

30 April 2015; 20:15	Bosnia and Herzegovina	26–23	Lithuania	Sports Hall Cazin, Cazin; Attendance: 2,000; Referees: Harabagiu, Stănescu (ROU)
30 April 2015; 20:15	Prce 9	(13–10)	Petreikis 6	Sports Hall Cazin, Cazin; Attendance: 2,000; Referees: Harabagiu, Stănescu (ROU)
30 April 2015; 20:15	3× (yellow card) 5× (suspension)	Report	1× (yellow card) 6× (suspension)	Sports Hall Cazin, Cazin; Attendance: 2,000; Referees: Harabagiu, Stănescu (ROU)

2 May 2015; 20:15	Denmark	32–23	Belarus	NRGi Arena, Aarhus; Attendance: 4,959; Referees: Kurtagic, Wetterwik (SWE)
2 May 2015; 20:15	Hansen, Mortensen 7	(18–11)	D. Rutenka, S. Rutenka 5	NRGi Arena, Aarhus; Attendance: 4,959; Referees: Kurtagic, Wetterwik (SWE)
2 May 2015; 20:15	3× (yellow card) 5× (suspension)	Report	3× (yellow card) 5× (suspension)	NRGi Arena, Aarhus; Attendance: 4,959; Referees: Kurtagic, Wetterwik (SWE)

3 May 2015; 17:00	Lithuania	19–15	Bosnia and Herzegovina	Kaunas Sports Hall, Kaunas; Attendance: 1,000; Referees: Tzaferopoulos, Bethmann (GRE)
3 May 2015; 17:00	Strazdas, Plėta 4	(10–7)	Prce 5	Kaunas Sports Hall, Kaunas; Attendance: 1,000; Referees: Tzaferopoulos, Bethmann (GRE)
3 May 2015; 17:00	3× (yellow card) 4× (suspension)	Report	3× (yellow card) 3× (suspension)	Kaunas Sports Hall, Kaunas; Attendance: 1,000; Referees: Tzaferopoulos, Bethmann (GRE)

10 June 2015; 19:00	Lithuania	25–31	Denmark	Kaunas Sports Hall, Kaunas; Attendance: 1,400; Referees: Gasmi, Gasmi (FRA)
10 June 2015; 19:00	Truchanovičius 6	(13–18)	Nøddesbo 6	Kaunas Sports Hall, Kaunas; Attendance: 1,400; Referees: Gasmi, Gasmi (FRA)
10 June 2015; 19:00	3× (yellow card) 4× (suspension)	Report	3× (yellow card) 3× (suspension)	Kaunas Sports Hall, Kaunas; Attendance: 1,400; Referees: Gasmi, Gasmi (FRA)

11 June 2015; 20:15	Bosnia and Herzegovina	22–22	Belarus	Arena Zenica, Zenica; Attendance: 6,000; Referees: Brunovský, Čanda (SVK)
11 June 2015; 20:15	Dejan Malinović 6	(14–12)	Pukhouski 6	Arena Zenica, Zenica; Attendance: 6,000; Referees: Brunovský, Čanda (SVK)
11 June 2015; 20:15	3× (yellow card) 5× (suspension)	Report	3× (yellow card) 3× (suspension)	Arena Zenica, Zenica; Attendance: 6,000; Referees: Brunovský, Čanda (SVK)

14 June 2015; 16:00	Belarus	31–24	Lithuania	Minsk Sports Palace, Minsk; Attendance: 3,310; Referees: Pandzić, Mosorinski (SRB)
14 June 2015; 16:00	Pukhouski 8	(15–10)	Petreikis, Truchanovičius 6	Minsk Sports Palace, Minsk; Attendance: 3,310; Referees: Pandzić, Mosorinski (SRB)
14 June 2015; 16:00	2× (yellow card) 3× (suspension)	Report	3× (yellow card) 2× (suspension)	Minsk Sports Palace, Minsk; Attendance: 3,310; Referees: Pandzić, Mosorinski (SRB)

14 June 2015; 20:15	Denmark	26–25	Bosnia and Herzegovina	Brøndby Hall, Brøndby; Attendance: 4,467; Referees: Hansen, Pettersen (NOR)
14 June 2015; 20:15	Schmidt 6	(13–14)	Prce 9	Brøndby Hall, Brøndby; Attendance: 4,467; Referees: Hansen, Pettersen (NOR)
14 June 2015; 20:15	3× (yellow card) 4× (suspension)	Report	3× (yellow card) 3× (suspension)	Brøndby Hall, Brøndby; Attendance: 4,467; Referees: Hansen, Pettersen (NOR)

=== Group 3 ===
Pos	Team	Pld	W	D	L	GF	GA	GD	Pts	Qualification
1	Sweden	6	5	1	0	182	134	+48	11	Final tournament
2	Slovenia	6	4	1	1	185	149	+36	9	Final tournament
3	Latvia	6	2	0	4	133	182	−49	4	
4	Slovakia	6	0	0	6	130	165	−35	0	

29 October 2014; 20:30	Slovenia	31–25	Slovakia	Arena Bonifika, Koper; Attendance: 2,200; Referees: Geipel, Helbig (GER)
29 October 2014; 20:30	Gajić 9	(15–12)	Rábek 7	Arena Bonifika, Koper; Attendance: 2,200; Referees: Geipel, Helbig (GER)
29 October 2014; 20:30	3× (yellow card) 3× (suspension)	Report	3× (yellow card) 2× (suspension)	Arena Bonifika, Koper; Attendance: 2,200; Referees: Geipel, Helbig (GER)

30 October 2014; 17:15	Sweden	33–23	Latvia	Rosvalla Nyköping Eventcenter, Nyköping; Attendance: 3,000; Referees: Pandzić, Satordzija (BIH)
30 October 2014; 17:15	Ekberg, Petersen 6	(18–8)	Krištopāns 8	Rosvalla Nyköping Eventcenter, Nyköping; Attendance: 3,000; Referees: Pandzić, Satordzija (BIH)
30 October 2014; 17:15	3× (yellow card) 5× (suspension)	Report	3× (yellow card) 4× (suspension) 1× (red card)	Rosvalla Nyköping Eventcenter, Nyköping; Attendance: 3,000; Referees: Pandzić, Satordzija (BIH)

1 November 2014; 17:05	Latvia	28–39	Slovenia	Sports Centre Dobele, Dobele; Attendance: 1,150; Referees: Andorka, Hucker (HUN)
1 November 2014; 17:05	Jurdžs 7	(13–21)	Gajić 10	Sports Centre Dobele, Dobele; Attendance: 1,150; Referees: Andorka, Hucker (HUN)
1 November 2014; 17:05	3× (yellow card) 5× (suspension) 1× (red card)	Report	3× (yellow card) 2× (suspension) 1× (red card)	Sports Centre Dobele, Dobele; Attendance: 1,150; Referees: Andorka, Hucker (HUN)

1 November 2014; 18:00	Slovakia	23–33	Sweden	Hant Aréna, Bratislava; Attendance: 2,500; Referees: Raluy, Sabroso (ESP)
1 November 2014; 18:00	Urban 7	(15–16)	Nilsson 9	Hant Aréna, Bratislava; Attendance: 2,500; Referees: Raluy, Sabroso (ESP)
1 November 2014; 18:00	3× (yellow card) 4× (suspension)	Report	3× (yellow card) 3× (suspension)	Hant Aréna, Bratislava; Attendance: 2,500; Referees: Raluy, Sabroso (ESP)

29 April 2015; 19:15	Sweden	28–24	Slovenia	Vida Arena, Växjö; Attendance: 4,512; Referees: Gatelis, Mažeika (LTU)
29 April 2015; 19:15	Gottfridsson 10	(18–10)	Gajič 10	Vida Arena, Växjö; Attendance: 4,512; Referees: Gatelis, Mažeika (LTU)
29 April 2015; 19:15	3× (yellow card) 6× (suspension)	Report	3× (yellow card) 4× (suspension)	Vida Arena, Växjö; Attendance: 4,512; Referees: Gatelis, Mažeika (LTU)

29 April 2015; 19:35	Latvia	25–18	Slovakia	Sports Centre Dobele, Dobele; Attendance: 900; Referees: Hansen, Pettersen (NOR)
29 April 2015; 19:35	Krištopāns 8	(11–7)	Rábek 8	Sports Centre Dobele, Dobele; Attendance: 900; Referees: Hansen, Pettersen (NOR)
29 April 2015; 19:35	3× (yellow card) 6× (suspension)	Report	3× (yellow card) 5× (suspension)	Sports Centre Dobele, Dobele; Attendance: 900; Referees: Hansen, Pettersen (NOR)

2 May 2015; 18:00	Slovakia	22–23	Latvia	Sportova hala Na Zabrani, Hlohovec; Attendance: 1,500; Referees: Leandersson, Lindroos (FIN)
2 May 2015; 18:00	Hruščák 9	(16–10)	Pavlovičs 9	Sportova hala Na Zabrani, Hlohovec; Attendance: 1,500; Referees: Leandersson, Lindroos (FIN)
2 May 2015; 18:00	3× (yellow card) 7× (suspension)	Report	2× (yellow card) 6× (suspension)	Sportova hala Na Zabrani, Hlohovec; Attendance: 1,500; Referees: Leandersson, Lindroos (FIN)

3 May 2015; 17:30	Slovenia	28–28	Sweden	Zlatorog Arena, Celje; Attendance: 3,500; Referees: Dentz, Reibel (FRA)
3 May 2015; 17:30	Gajič 13	(13–16)	Olsson 5	Zlatorog Arena, Celje; Attendance: 3,500; Referees: Dentz, Reibel (FRA)
3 May 2015; 17:30	3× (yellow card) 2× (suspension)	Report	3× (yellow card)	Zlatorog Arena, Celje; Attendance: 3,500; Referees: Dentz, Reibel (FRA)

10 June 2015; 17:00	Slovakia	20–26	Slovenia	Tatran Handball Arena, Prešov; Attendance: 1,450; Referees: Stark, Stefan (ROU)
10 June 2015; 17:00	Rábek 7	(10–13)	Natek, Šoštarič 4	Tatran Handball Arena, Prešov; Attendance: 1,450; Referees: Stark, Stefan (ROU)
10 June 2015; 17:00	2× (yellow card) 3× (suspension)	Report	3× (yellow card) 4× (suspension)	Tatran Handball Arena, Prešov; Attendance: 1,450; Referees: Stark, Stefan (ROU)

10 June 2015; 19:35	Latvia	14–33	Sweden	Sports Centre Dobele, Dobele; Attendance: 600; Referees: Katsikis, Michailidis (GRE)
10 June 2015; 19:35	Pavlovičs 3	(8–16)	Zachrisson 5	Sports Centre Dobele, Dobele; Attendance: 600; Referees: Katsikis, Michailidis (GRE)
10 June 2015; 19:35	3× (yellow card) 2× (suspension)	Report	1× (yellow card) 2× (suspension)	Sports Centre Dobele, Dobele; Attendance: 600; Referees: Katsikis, Michailidis (GRE)

13 June 2015; 18:30	Slovenia	37–20	Latvia	Red Hall, Velenje; Attendance: 1,200; Referees: Tzaferopoulos, Bethmann (GRE)
13 June 2015; 18:30	Marguč, Šoštarič 5	(18–11)	Jurdžs 10	Red Hall, Velenje; Attendance: 1,200; Referees: Tzaferopoulos, Bethmann (GRE)
13 June 2015; 18:30	3× (yellow card) 6× (suspension)	Report	2× (yellow card) 3× (suspension)	Red Hall, Velenje; Attendance: 1,200; Referees: Tzaferopoulos, Bethmann (GRE)

14 June 2015; 16:15	Sweden	27–22	Slovakia	Hovet, Stockholm; Attendance: 7,000; Referees: Buache, Meyer (SUI)
14 June 2015; 16:15	Ekberg 10	(16–10)	Stranovský 6	Hovet, Stockholm; Attendance: 7,000; Referees: Buache, Meyer (SUI)
14 June 2015; 16:15	3× (yellow card) 5× (suspension)	Report	2× (yellow card) 5× (suspension)	Hovet, Stockholm; Attendance: 7,000; Referees: Buache, Meyer (SUI)

=== Group 4 ===
Pos	Team	Pld	W	D	L	GF	GA	GD	Pts	Qualification
1	Iceland	6	4	1	1	191	137	+54	9	Final tournament
2	Serbia	6	3	2	1	153	152	+1	8	Final tournament
3	Montenegro	6	3	1	2	146	152	−6	7	Final tournament
4	Israel	6	0	0	6	134	183	−49	0	

29 October 2014; 19:30	Iceland	36–19	Israel	Laugardalshöll, Reykjavík; Attendance: 1,950; Referees: Buache, Meyer (SUI)
29 October 2014; 19:30	Sigurðsson 9	(14–9)	Pomeranz 6	Laugardalshöll, Reykjavík; Attendance: 1,950; Referees: Buache, Meyer (SUI)
29 October 2014; 19:30	3× (yellow card) 2× (suspension)	Report	1× (yellow card) 5× (suspension) 1× (red card)	Laugardalshöll, Reykjavík; Attendance: 1,950; Referees: Buache, Meyer (SUI)

29 October 2014; 20:00	Serbia	25–21	Montenegro	Pionir Hall, Belgrade; Attendance: 7,000; Referees: Dinu, Din (ROU)
29 October 2014; 20:00	Djukić, Vujin 7	(10–9)	Melić 6	Pionir Hall, Belgrade; Attendance: 7,000; Referees: Dinu, Din (ROU)
29 October 2014; 20:00	3× (yellow card) 7× (suspension)	Report	2× (yellow card) 5× (suspension)	Pionir Hall, Belgrade; Attendance: 7,000; Referees: Dinu, Din (ROU)

2 November 2014; 18:00	Montenegro	25–24	Iceland	Sportska Dvorana Topolica, Bar; Attendance: 2,234; Referees: Dentz, Reibel (FRA)
2 November 2014; 18:00	Borozan 10	(14–12)	Petersson 7	Sportska Dvorana Topolica, Bar; Attendance: 2,234; Referees: Dentz, Reibel (FRA)
2 November 2014; 18:00	3× (yellow card) 1× (suspension)	Report	2× (yellow card) 3× (suspension)	Sportska Dvorana Topolica, Bar; Attendance: 2,234; Referees: Dentz, Reibel (FRA)

2 November 2014; 19:45	Israel	22–26	Serbia	Maccabi House Arena, Rishon LeZion; Attendance: 1,050; Referees: Gousko, Repkin (BLR)
2 November 2014; 19:45	Pomeranz 9	(10–13)	Stojković 6	Maccabi House Arena, Rishon LeZion; Attendance: 1,050; Referees: Gousko, Repkin (BLR)
2 November 2014; 19:45	3× (yellow card) 4× (suspension)	Report	3× (yellow card) 2× (suspension)	Maccabi House Arena, Rishon LeZion; Attendance: 1,050; Referees: Gousko, Repkin (BLR)

29 April 2015; 19:30	Iceland	38–22	Serbia	Laugardalshöll, Reykjavík; Attendance: 2,200; Referees: Geipel, Helbig (GER)
29 April 2015; 19:30	Sigurðsson 12	(16–10)	Marsenić 6	Laugardalshöll, Reykjavík; Attendance: 2,200; Referees: Geipel, Helbig (GER)
29 April 2015; 19:30	3× (yellow card) 2× (suspension)	Report	3× (yellow card) 4× (suspension)	Laugardalshöll, Reykjavík; Attendance: 2,200; Referees: Geipel, Helbig (GER)

30 April 2015; 19:45	Israel	19–22	Montenegro	Drive in Arena, Tel Aviv; Attendance: 1,500; Referees: Togstad, Kristiansen (NOR)
30 April 2015; 19:45	Levy 6	(9–9)	Lipovina 7	Drive in Arena, Tel Aviv; Attendance: 1,500; Referees: Togstad, Kristiansen (NOR)
30 April 2015; 19:45	3× (yellow card) 2× (suspension)	Report	3× (yellow card) 4× (suspension)	Drive in Arena, Tel Aviv; Attendance: 1,500; Referees: Togstad, Kristiansen (NOR)

3 May 2015; 19:00	Serbia	25–25	Iceland	Čair Sports Center, Niš; Attendance: 5,600; Referees: Stoļarovs, Līcis (LAT)
3 May 2015; 19:00	Ilić 6	(13–11)	Svavarsson 5	Čair Sports Center, Niš; Attendance: 5,600; Referees: Stoļarovs, Līcis (LAT)
3 May 2015; 19:00	2× (yellow card) 2× (suspension)	Report	2× (yellow card) 4× (suspension) 1× (red card)	Čair Sports Center, Niš; Attendance: 5,600; Referees: Stoļarovs, Līcis (LAT)

3 May 2015; 20:00	Montenegro	33–27	Israel	Sportska Dvorana Topolica, Bar; Attendance: 2,500; Referees: Brkic, Jusufhodzic (AUT)
3 May 2015; 20:00	Melić, Ševaljević 6	(16–13)	Appo 7	Sportska Dvorana Topolica, Bar; Attendance: 2,500; Referees: Brkic, Jusufhodzic (AUT)
3 May 2015; 20:00	3× (yellow card) 3× (suspension)	Report	3× (yellow card) 1× (suspension)	Sportska Dvorana Topolica, Bar; Attendance: 2,500; Referees: Brkic, Jusufhodzic (AUT)

10 June 2015; 19:45	Israel	24–34	Iceland	Drive in Arena, Tel Aviv; Attendance: 1,200; Referees: Nikolov, Nachevski (MKD)
10 June 2015; 19:45	Levy, Gal 5	(12–17)	Sigurmannsson 6	Drive in Arena, Tel Aviv; Attendance: 1,200; Referees: Nikolov, Nachevski (MKD)
10 June 2015; 19:45	3× (yellow card) 4× (suspension)	Report	3× (yellow card) 7× (suspension)	Drive in Arena, Tel Aviv; Attendance: 1,200; Referees: Nikolov, Nachevski (MKD)

10 June 2015; 20:00	Montenegro	23–23	Serbia	Sportska Dvorana Topolica, Bar; Attendance: 2,500; Referees: Togstad, Kristiansen (NOR)
10 June 2015; 20:00	four players 4	(11–14)	Ilić 5	Sportska Dvorana Topolica, Bar; Attendance: 2,500; Referees: Togstad, Kristiansen (NOR)
10 June 2015; 20:00	3× (yellow card) 2× (suspension)	Report	3× (yellow card) 4× (suspension)	Sportska Dvorana Topolica, Bar; Attendance: 2,500; Referees: Togstad, Kristiansen (NOR)

14 June 2015; 17:00	Iceland	34–22	Montenegro	Laugardalshöll, Reykjavík; Attendance: 2,050; Referees: Horáček, Novotný (CZE)
14 June 2015; 17:00	Sigurðsson 10	(19–11)	Ševaljević, Borozan 6	Laugardalshöll, Reykjavík; Attendance: 2,050; Referees: Horáček, Novotný (CZE)
14 June 2015; 17:00	3× (yellow card) 5× (suspension)	Report	2× (yellow card) 6× (suspension)	Laugardalshöll, Reykjavík; Attendance: 2,050; Referees: Horáček, Novotný (CZE)

14 June 2015; 18:30	Serbia	32–23	Israel	Kraljevo Sports Hall, Kraljevo; Attendance: 3,000; Referees: Cvetko, Kavalar (SLO)
14 June 2015; 18:30	Zelenović 6	(19–12)	Davda, Friedmann 5	Kraljevo Sports Hall, Kraljevo; Attendance: 3,000; Referees: Cvetko, Kavalar (SLO)
14 June 2015; 18:30	3× (yellow card) 3× (suspension)	Report	3× (yellow card) 1× (suspension)	Kraljevo Sports Hall, Kraljevo; Attendance: 3,000; Referees: Cvetko, Kavalar (SLO)

=== Group 5 ===
Pos	Team	Pld	W	D	L	GF	GA	GD	Pts	Qualification
1	Hungary	6	6	0	0	178	151	+27	12	Final tournament
2	Russia	6	4	0	2	174	168	+6	8	Final tournament
3	Portugal	6	2	0	4	183	176	+7	4	
4	Ukraine	6	0	0	6	148	188	−40	0	

29 October 2014; 20:30	Hungary	31–30	Portugal	Generali aréna, Miskolc; Attendance: 2,000; Referees: Baďura, Ondogrecula (SVK)
29 October 2014; 20:30	three players 5	(19–15)	Rocha 9	Generali aréna, Miskolc; Attendance: 2,000; Referees: Baďura, Ondogrecula (SVK)
29 October 2014; 20:30	3× (yellow card) 1× (suspension)	Report	3× (yellow card) 4× (suspension)	Generali aréna, Miskolc; Attendance: 2,000; Referees: Baďura, Ondogrecula (SVK)

2 November 2014; 16:00	Portugal	29–34	Russia	Pavilhao Desportivo Municipal, Vila Nova de Gaia; Attendance: 2,000; Referees: Nikolov, Nachevski (MKD)
2 November 2014; 16:00	Portela 7	(12–18)	Igropulo 8	Pavilhao Desportivo Municipal, Vila Nova de Gaia; Attendance: 2,000; Referees: Nikolov, Nachevski (MKD)
2 November 2014; 16:00	3× (yellow card) 4× (suspension)	Report	3× (yellow card) 5× (suspension)	Pavilhao Desportivo Municipal, Vila Nova de Gaia; Attendance: 2,000; Referees: Nikolov, Nachevski (MKD)

2 November 2014; 18:00	Ukraine	20–33	Hungary	Palace of Sports, Kyiv; Attendance: 2,000; Referees: Gjeding, Hansen (DEN)
2 November 2014; 18:00	Onufryienko 5	(9–15)	Iváncsik 7	Palace of Sports, Kyiv; Attendance: 2,000; Referees: Gjeding, Hansen (DEN)
2 November 2014; 18:00	3× (yellow card) 3× (suspension)	Report	4× (yellow card) 3× (suspension)	Palace of Sports, Kyiv; Attendance: 2,000; Referees: Gjeding, Hansen (DEN)

30 April 2015; 18:00	Ukraine	26–32	Portugal	TRC-Terminal Brovary, Brovary; Attendance: 1,120; Referees: Leszczynski, Piechota (POL)
30 April 2015; 18:00	Tiutiunnik 7	(12–17)	Portela 10	TRC-Terminal Brovary, Brovary; Attendance: 1,120; Referees: Leszczynski, Piechota (POL)
30 April 2015; 18:00	3× (yellow card) 6× (suspension)	Report	3× (yellow card) 6× (suspension)	TRC-Terminal Brovary, Brovary; Attendance: 1,120; Referees: Leszczynski, Piechota (POL)

30 April 2015; 19:00	Russia	23–27	Hungary	Olimpiysky Sport Palace, Chekhov; Attendance: 1,800; Referees: Krstić, Ljubić (SLO)
30 April 2015; 19:00	Shishkarev 6	(8–15)	Császár 5	Olimpiysky Sport Palace, Chekhov; Attendance: 1,800; Referees: Krstić, Ljubić (SLO)
30 April 2015; 19:00	2× (yellow card) 4× (suspension)	Report	2× (yellow card) 3× (suspension)	Olimpiysky Sport Palace, Chekhov; Attendance: 1,800; Referees: Krstić, Ljubić (SLO)

2 May 2015; 16:10	Hungary	29–25	Russia	Veszprém Aréna, Veszprém; Attendance: 3,215; Referees: Fleisch, Rieber (GER)
2 May 2015; 16:10	Bodó, Császár 6	(15–11)	Shishkarev, Zhitnikov 4	Veszprém Aréna, Veszprém; Attendance: 3,215; Referees: Fleisch, Rieber (GER)
2 May 2015; 16:10	3× (yellow card) 2× (suspension)	Report	2× (yellow card) 5× (suspension) 1× (red card)	Veszprém Aréna, Veszprém; Attendance: 3,215; Referees: Fleisch, Rieber (GER)

3 May 2015; 16:05	Portugal	34–24	Ukraine	Pavilhao Desportivo Municipal, Vila Nova de Gaia; Attendance: 1,500; Referees: Johansson, Kliko (SWE)
3 May 2015; 16:05	Antunes 10	(19–12)	Chychykalo 8	Pavilhao Desportivo Municipal, Vila Nova de Gaia; Attendance: 1,500; Referees: Johansson, Kliko (SWE)
3 May 2015; 16:05	3× (yellow card) 6× (suspension) 1× (red card)	Report	2× (yellow card) 4× (suspension)	Pavilhao Desportivo Municipal, Vila Nova de Gaia; Attendance: 1,500; Referees: Johansson, Kliko (SWE)

10 June 2015; 18:00	Russia	27–22	Ukraine	Minsk Sports Palace, Minsk; Attendance: 3,300; Referees: Gubica, Milošević (CRO)
10 June 2015; 18:00	Dibirov 6	(15–10)	Karamyshev 5	Minsk Sports Palace, Minsk; Attendance: 3,300; Referees: Gubica, Milošević (CRO)
10 June 2015; 18:00	3× (yellow card) 3× (suspension)	Report	3× (yellow card) 3× (suspension)	Minsk Sports Palace, Minsk; Attendance: 3,300; Referees: Gubica, Milošević (CRO)

10 June 2015; 20:15	Portugal	25–26	Hungary	Pavilhão Municipal, Santo Tirso; Attendance: 2,000; Referees: Gousko, Repkin (BLR)
10 June 2015; 20:15	Duarte 10	(15–12)	Bodó 5	Pavilhão Municipal, Santo Tirso; Attendance: 2,000; Referees: Gousko, Repkin (BLR)
10 June 2015; 20:15	3× (yellow card) 5× (suspension)	Report	2× (yellow card) 4× (suspension)	Pavilhão Municipal, Santo Tirso; Attendance: 2,000; Referees: Gousko, Repkin (BLR)

11 June 2015; 19:00	Ukraine	28–30	Russia	Minsk Sports Palace, Minsk; Attendance: 3,000; Referees: Gubica, Milošević (CRO)
11 June 2015; 19:00	Chychykalo 7	(14–16)	Dereven, Dibirov 6	Minsk Sports Palace, Minsk; Attendance: 3,000; Referees: Gubica, Milošević (CRO)
11 June 2015; 19:00	3× (yellow card) 3× (suspension)	Report	3× (yellow card) 5× (suspension)	Minsk Sports Palace, Minsk; Attendance: 3,000; Referees: Gubica, Milošević (CRO)

13 June 2015; 16:00	Hungary	32–28	Ukraine	Audi Aréna, Győr; Attendance: 2,500; Referees: Skruzny, Kavulic (CZE)
13 June 2015; 16:00	Bodó 9	(15–14)	Chychykalo 8	Audi Aréna, Győr; Attendance: 2,500; Referees: Skruzny, Kavulic (CZE)
13 June 2015; 16:00	1× (yellow card) 3× (suspension)	Report	3× (yellow card) 5× (suspension)	Audi Aréna, Győr; Attendance: 2,500; Referees: Skruzny, Kavulic (CZE)

14 June 2015; 16:00	Russia	35–33	Portugal	CSKA Universal Sports Hall, Moscow; Attendance: 1,000; Referees: Nikolić, Stojković (SRB)
14 June 2015; 16:00	Dibirov 11	(15–16)	Portela 8	CSKA Universal Sports Hall, Moscow; Attendance: 1,000; Referees: Nikolić, Stojković (SRB)
14 June 2015; 16:00	3× (yellow card) 8× (suspension)	Report	3× (yellow card) 7× (suspension) 1× (red card)	CSKA Universal Sports Hall, Moscow; Attendance: 1,000; Referees: Nikolić, Stojković (SRB)

=== Group 6 ===
Pos	Team	Pld	W	D	L	GF	GA	GD	Pts	Qualification
1	France	6	6	0	0	201	145	+56	12	Final tournament
2	Macedonia	6	3	1	2	161	154	+7	7	Final tournament
3	Czech Republic	6	2	1	3	163	185	−22	5	
4	Switzerland	6	0	0	6	135	176	−41	0	

29 October 2014; 17:45	Macedonia	27–20	Switzerland	Boris Trajkovski Sports Center, Skopje; Attendance: 4,500; Referees: Gatelis, Mažeika (LTU)
29 October 2014; 17:45	Lazarov 13	(12–8)	Schmid 5	Boris Trajkovski Sports Center, Skopje; Attendance: 4,500; Referees: Gatelis, Mažeika (LTU)
29 October 2014; 17:45	3× (yellow card) 3× (suspension)	Report	3× (yellow card) 3× (suspension)	Boris Trajkovski Sports Center, Skopje; Attendance: 4,500; Referees: Gatelis, Mažeika (LTU)

30 October 2014; 19:30	France	41–25	Czech Republic	Le Phare, Chambéry; Attendance: 4,400; Referees: Stark, Stefan (ROU)
30 October 2014; 19:30	Joli 7	(20–12)	Linhart 8	Le Phare, Chambéry; Attendance: 4,400; Referees: Stark, Stefan (ROU)
30 October 2014; 19:30	3× (yellow card) 1× (suspension)	Report	3× (yellow card) 2× (suspension)	Le Phare, Chambéry; Attendance: 4,400; Referees: Stark, Stefan (ROU)

2 November 2014; 13:30	Czech Republic	27–27	Macedonia	Sportovní hala Euronics, Zlín; Attendance: 2,000; Referees: Togstad, Kristiansen (NOR)
2 November 2014; 13:30	Linhart, Zdráhala 7	(18–11)	Lazarov 10	Sportovní hala Euronics, Zlín; Attendance: 2,000; Referees: Togstad, Kristiansen (NOR)
2 November 2014; 13:30	2× (yellow card) 3× (suspension) 1× (red card)	Report	2× (yellow card) 3× (suspension)	Sportovní hala Euronics, Zlín; Attendance: 2,000; Referees: Togstad, Kristiansen (NOR)

2 November 2014; 14:30	Switzerland	24–33	France	St. Jakobshalle, Basel; Attendance: 6,700; Referees: Gubica, Milošević (CRO)
2 November 2014; 14:30	Sidorowiz 9	(11–15)	Guigou 8	St. Jakobshalle, Basel; Attendance: 6,700; Referees: Gubica, Milošević (CRO)
2 November 2014; 14:30	3× (yellow card) 5× (suspension)	Report	3× (yellow card) 1× (suspension)	St. Jakobshalle, Basel; Attendance: 6,700; Referees: Gubica, Milošević (CRO)

29 April 2015; 20:00	Switzerland	26–30	Czech Republic	BBC Arena, Schaffhausen; Attendance: 1,500; Referees: Santos, Fonseca (POR)
29 April 2015; 20:00	Schmid 7	(12–14)	Petrovský 6	BBC Arena, Schaffhausen; Attendance: 1,500; Referees: Santos, Fonseca (POR)
29 April 2015; 20:00	3× (yellow card) 4× (suspension) 1× (red card)	Report	3× (yellow card) 3× (suspension) 1× (red card)	BBC Arena, Schaffhausen; Attendance: 1,500; Referees: Santos, Fonseca (POR)

29 April 2015; 20:15	Macedonia	25–27	France	Boris Trajkovski Sports Center, Skopje; Attendance: 6,800; Referees: Horváth, Márton (HUN)
29 April 2015; 20:15	Lazarov 8	(13–15)	Guigou 6	Boris Trajkovski Sports Center, Skopje; Attendance: 6,800; Referees: Horváth, Márton (HUN)
29 April 2015; 20:15	3× (yellow card) 3× (suspension)	Report	3× (yellow card) 2× (suspension)	Boris Trajkovski Sports Center, Skopje; Attendance: 6,800; Referees: Horváth, Márton (HUN)

2 May 2015; 17:00	Czech Republic	29–25	Switzerland	Sportovní hala TJ Lokomotiva, Plzeň; Attendance: 795; Referees: Erdoğan, Özdeniz (TUR)
2 May 2015; 17:00	Zdráhala 9	(15–13)	Raemy 5	Sportovní hala TJ Lokomotiva, Plzeň; Attendance: 795; Referees: Erdoğan, Özdeniz (TUR)
2 May 2015; 17:00	3× (yellow card) 3× (suspension)	Report	3× (yellow card) 5× (suspension)	Sportovní hala TJ Lokomotiva, Plzeň; Attendance: 795; Referees: Erdoğan, Özdeniz (TUR)

3 May 2015; 17:05	France	35–24	Macedonia	Palais des sports André-Brouat, Toulouse; Attendance: 4,226; Referees: Caçador, Nicolau (POR)
3 May 2015; 17:05	Karabatić 6	(17–10)	Lazarov 9	Palais des sports André-Brouat, Toulouse; Attendance: 4,226; Referees: Caçador, Nicolau (POR)
3 May 2015; 17:05	3× (yellow card) 1× (suspension)	Report	3× (yellow card) 3× (suspension)	Palais des sports André-Brouat, Toulouse; Attendance: 4,226; Referees: Caçador, Nicolau (POR)

10 June 2015; 18:10	Czech Republic	24–34	France	Sportovní hala Vodova, Brno; Attendance: 3,000; Referees: Schulze, Tönnies (GER)
10 June 2015; 18:10	Zdráhala 9	(10–16)	Mahé 7	Sportovní hala Vodova, Brno; Attendance: 3,000; Referees: Schulze, Tönnies (GER)
10 June 2015; 18:10	3× (yellow card) 4× (suspension)	Report	2× (yellow card) 3× (suspension)	Sportovní hala Vodova, Brno; Attendance: 3,000; Referees: Schulze, Tönnies (GER)

10 June 2015; 20:00	Switzerland	17–26	Macedonia	Kreuzbleichhalle, St. Gallen; Attendance: 2,337; Referees: Zotin, Volodkov (RUS)
10 June 2015; 20:00	Schmid, Küttel 4	(8–15)	Lazarov 5	Kreuzbleichhalle, St. Gallen; Attendance: 2,337; Referees: Zotin, Volodkov (RUS)
10 June 2015; 20:00	3× (yellow card) 4× (suspension)	Report	3× (yellow card) 3× (suspension)	Kreuzbleichhalle, St. Gallen; Attendance: 2,337; Referees: Zotin, Volodkov (RUS)

13 June 2015; 15:15	France	31–23	Switzerland	Maison des Sports, Clermont-Ferrand; Attendance: 4,700; Referees: Cohen, Peretz (ISR)
13 June 2015; 15:15	Guigou, N'Guessan 6	(19–9)	Graubner 8	Maison des Sports, Clermont-Ferrand; Attendance: 4,700; Referees: Cohen, Peretz (ISR)
13 June 2015; 15:15	3× (yellow card) 1× (suspension)	Report	3× (yellow card) 4× (suspension)	Maison des Sports, Clermont-Ferrand; Attendance: 4,700; Referees: Cohen, Peretz (ISR)

14 June 2015; 17:45	Macedonia	32–28	Czech Republic	Boris Trajkovski Sports Center, Skopje; Attendance: 6,963; Referees: Dinu, Din (ROU)
14 June 2015; 17:45	Lazarov 11	(15–12)	Zdráhala 6	Boris Trajkovski Sports Center, Skopje; Attendance: 6,963; Referees: Dinu, Din (ROU)
14 June 2015; 17:45	3× (yellow card) 4× (suspension)	Report	3× (yellow card) 5× (suspension)	Boris Trajkovski Sports Center, Skopje; Attendance: 6,963; Referees: Dinu, Din (ROU)

=== Group 7 ===
Pos	Team	Pld	W	D	L	GF	GA	GD	Pts	Qualification
1	Spain	6	5	0	1	184	132	+52	10	Final tournament
2	Germany	6	5	0	1	172	145	+27	10	Final tournament
3	Austria	6	2	0	4	148	161	−13	4	
4	Finland	6	0	0	6	126	192	−66	0	

29 October 2014; 20:15	Germany	30–18	Finland	Schwalbe Arena, Gummersbach; Attendance: 4,141; Referees: Vešović, Mitrović (MNE)
29 October 2014; 20:15	Gensheimer, Weinhold 4	(19–8)	A. Rönnberg 6	Schwalbe Arena, Gummersbach; Attendance: 4,141; Referees: Vešović, Mitrović (MNE)
29 October 2014; 20:15	2× (yellow card) 4× (suspension)	Report	3× (yellow card) 2× (suspension)	Schwalbe Arena, Gummersbach; Attendance: 4,141; Referees: Vešović, Mitrović (MNE)

29 October 2014; 20:30	Spain	27–16	Austria	Pavillón Municipal dos Deportes de Pontevedra, Pontevedra; Attendance: 1,800; Referees: Pichon, Reveret (FRA)
29 October 2014; 20:30	Tomás 6	(12–8)	Weber 3	Pavillón Municipal dos Deportes de Pontevedra, Pontevedra; Attendance: 1,800; Referees: Pichon, Reveret (FRA)
29 October 2014; 20:30	3× (yellow card) 4× (suspension)	Report	3× (yellow card) 6× (suspension)	Pavillón Municipal dos Deportes de Pontevedra, Pontevedra; Attendance: 1,800; Referees: Pichon, Reveret (FRA)

1 November 2014; 17:05	Finland	27–34	Spain	Energia Areena, Vantaa; Attendance: 2,200; Referees: Herczeg, Südi (HUN)
1 November 2014; 17:05	Tamminen 11	(15–17)	Maqueda, Tomás 7	Energia Areena, Vantaa; Attendance: 2,200; Referees: Herczeg, Südi (HUN)
1 November 2014; 17:05	3× (yellow card) 4× (suspension) 1× (red card)	Report	1× (yellow card) 2× (suspension)	Energia Areena, Vantaa; Attendance: 2,200; Referees: Herczeg, Südi (HUN)

2 November 2014; 18:00	Austria	24–28	Germany	Albert Schultz Eishalle, Vienna; Attendance: 6,000; Referees: Nikolić, Stojković (SRB)
2 November 2014; 18:00	Weber 6	(11–12)	Gensheimer 10	Albert Schultz Eishalle, Vienna; Attendance: 6,000; Referees: Nikolić, Stojković (SRB)
2 November 2014; 18:00	3× (yellow card) 5× (suspension)	Report	2× (yellow card) 3× (suspension)	Albert Schultz Eishalle, Vienna; Attendance: 6,000; Referees: Nikolić, Stojković (SRB)

29 April 2015; 18:10	Germany	29–28	Spain	SAP Arena, Mannheim; Attendance: 11,895; Referees: Gubica, Milošević (CRO)
29 April 2015; 18:10	Gensheimer 9	(17–15)	Rivera Folch 10	SAP Arena, Mannheim; Attendance: 11,895; Referees: Gubica, Milošević (CRO)
29 April 2015; 18:10	3× (yellow card) 3× (suspension)	Report	3× (yellow card) 4× (suspension)	SAP Arena, Mannheim; Attendance: 11,895; Referees: Gubica, Milošević (CRO)

29 April 2015; 18:30	Finland	23–26	Austria	Energia Areena, Vantaa; Attendance: 1,500; Referees: Baranowski, Lemanowicz (POL)
29 April 2015; 18:30	Broman 7	(12–11)	Božović 6	Energia Areena, Vantaa; Attendance: 1,500; Referees: Baranowski, Lemanowicz (POL)
29 April 2015; 18:30	3× (yellow card) 2× (suspension)	Report	3× (yellow card) 4× (suspension)	Energia Areena, Vantaa; Attendance: 1,500; Referees: Baranowski, Lemanowicz (POL)

2 May 2015; 20:25	Austria	29–22	Finland	Handballarena Rieden-Vorkloster, Bregenz; Attendance: 2,000; Referees: Covalciuc, Covalciuc (MDA)
2 May 2015; 20:25	Weber 6	(14–14)	Sundberg 6	Handballarena Rieden-Vorkloster, Bregenz; Attendance: 2,000; Referees: Covalciuc, Covalciuc (MDA)
2 May 2015; 20:25	3× (yellow card) 4× (suspension)	Report	2× (yellow card) 3× (suspension)	Handballarena Rieden-Vorkloster, Bregenz; Attendance: 2,000; Referees: Covalciuc, Covalciuc (MDA)

3 May 2015; 17:00	Spain	26–20	Germany	Palacio de los Deportes de León, León; Attendance: 4,500; Referees: Gjeding, Hansen (DEN)
3 May 2015; 17:00	Rivera Folch 6	(11–8)	Gensheimer 5	Palacio de los Deportes de León, León; Attendance: 4,500; Referees: Gjeding, Hansen (DEN)
3 May 2015; 17:00	3× (yellow card) 4× (suspension)	Report	2× (yellow card) 5× (suspension)	Palacio de los Deportes de León, León; Attendance: 4,500; Referees: Gjeding, Hansen (DEN)

10 June 2015; 19:00	Finland	20–34	Germany	Energia Areena, Vantaa; Attendance: 1,300; Referees: Baďura, Ondogrecula (SVK)
10 June 2015; 19:00	Rönnberg 7	(8–16)	Gensheimer 6	Energia Areena, Vantaa; Attendance: 1,300; Referees: Baďura, Ondogrecula (SVK)
10 June 2015; 19:00	3× (yellow card) 3× (suspension)	Report	2× (yellow card) 3× (suspension)	Energia Areena, Vantaa; Attendance: 1,300; Referees: Baďura, Ondogrecula (SVK)

10 June 2015; 20:25	Austria	24–30	Spain	Olympiahalle, Innsbruck; Attendance: 3,500; Referees: Gatelis, Mažeika (LTU)
10 June 2015; 20:25	Santos 6	(12–16)	Rivera Folch 5	Olympiahalle, Innsbruck; Attendance: 3,500; Referees: Gatelis, Mažeika (LTU)
10 June 2015; 20:25	3× (yellow card) 3× (suspension)	Report	2× (yellow card) 2× (suspension)	Olympiahalle, Innsbruck; Attendance: 3,500; Referees: Gatelis, Mažeika (LTU)

13 June 2015; 18:30	Spain	39–16	Finland	Palacio de los Deportes de La Rioja, Logroño; Attendance: 2,200; Referees: Panayides, Andreou (CYP)
13 June 2015; 18:30	four players 4	(21–9)	Broman, Sundberg 3	Palacio de los Deportes de La Rioja, Logroño; Attendance: 2,200; Referees: Panayides, Andreou (CYP)
13 June 2015; 18:30	3× (yellow card) 1× (suspension)	Report	3× (yellow card) 3× (suspension)	Palacio de los Deportes de La Rioja, Logroño; Attendance: 2,200; Referees: Panayides, Andreou (CYP)

14 June 2015; 15:15	Germany	31–29	Austria	Sparkassen-Arena, Kiel; Attendance: 8,074; Referees: Kurtagic, Wetterwik (SWE)
14 June 2015; 15:15	Wiede 8	(14–13)	Santos 8	Sparkassen-Arena, Kiel; Attendance: 8,074; Referees: Kurtagic, Wetterwik (SWE)
14 June 2015; 15:15	2× (yellow card) 3× (suspension)	Report	3× (yellow card) 2× (suspension)	Sparkassen-Arena, Kiel; Attendance: 8,074; Referees: Kurtagic, Wetterwik (SWE)
