= Roman Chychykalo =

Ukrainian handball player

Personal information
- Nationality: Ukrainian
- Born: 3 July 1992 (age 34) Odesa, Ukraine
- Height: 1.92 m (6 ft 4 in)

Sport
- Sport: Handball
- Position: Right back
- Current club: Gwardia Opole
- Number: 71
National team
Years	Team	Apps	(Gls)
–	Ukraine	31	(19)

Roman Chychykalo (born 3 July 1992) is a Ukrainian handball player for Zagłębie Lubin and the Ukrainian national team.

He represented Ukraine at the 2020 European Men's Handball Championship.
