= Mark Ferguson (handballer) =

Irish handballer

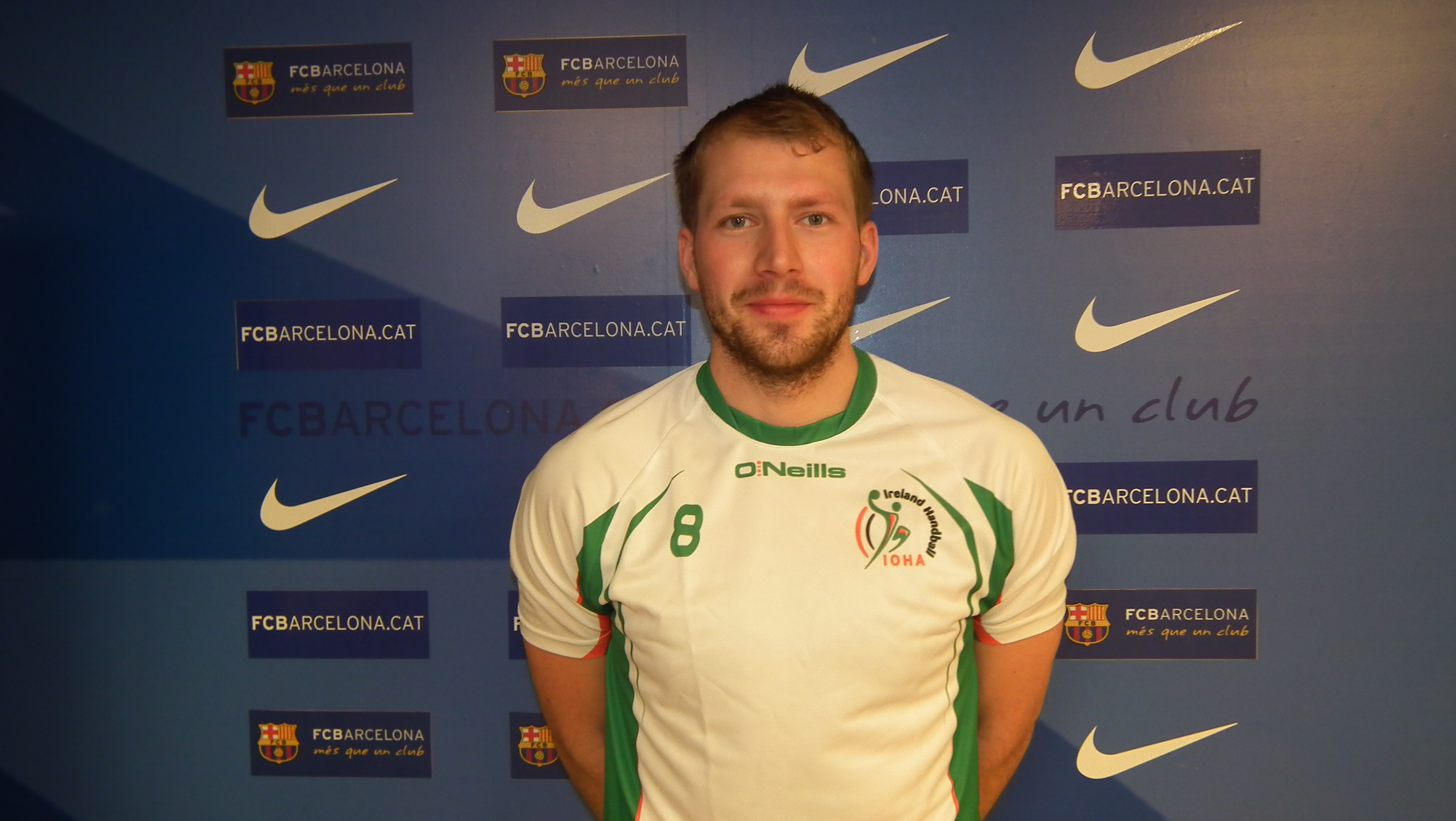

Personal information
- Nationality: Irish
- Born: 21 May 1990 (age 36) Blanchardstown, Ireland
- Height: 1.87 m (6 ft 2 in)

Sport
- Sport: Handball
- Position: Pivot
- Current club: Lughnasa HC
- Number: 8
National team
| Years | Team | Apps | (Gls) |
| 2011– | Ireland | 16 | (33) |

Mark Ferguson (born 21 May 1990) is an Irish handballer, currently playing for Lughnasa HC.

== Achievements ==
- Irish Senior League:
  - Final 4: 2011–12, 2012–13,
- IOHA Cup:
  - Semifinalist: 2012-13
